= List of minor planets: 418001–419000 =

The following is a partial list of minor planets, running from minor-planet number 418001 through 419000, inclusive. The primary data for this and other partial lists is based on JPL's "Small-Body Orbital Elements" and data available from the Minor Planet Center. Critical list information is also provided by the MPC, unless otherwise specified from Lowell Observatory. A detailed description of the table's columns and additional sources are given on the main page including a complete list of every page in this series, and a statistical break-up on the dynamical classification of minor planets.

Also see the summary list of all named bodies in numerical and alphabetical order, and the corresponding naming citations for the number range of this particular list. New namings may only be added to this list after official publication, as the preannouncement of names is condemned by the Working Group for Small Bodies Nomenclature of the International Astronomical Union.

| Near-Earth obj. | MBA (inner) | MBA (outer) | Centaur |
| Mars-crosser | MBA (middle) | Jupiter trojan | Trans-Neptunian obj. |
| Unclassified |

== 418001–418100 ==
| Designation | | | Discovery | | | Properties | | Ref |
| Permanent | Provisional | Named after | Date | Site | Discoverer(s) | Category | Diam. | Ref |
|---|---|---|---|---|---|---|---|---|
| 418001 | 2007 TB_{405} | — | October 7, 2007 | Kitt Peak | Spacewatch | · | 770 m | MPC · JPL |
| 418002 | 2007 TR_{418} | — | October 8, 2007 | Kitt Peak | Spacewatch | CYB | 3.8 km | MPC · JPL |
| 418003 | 2007 TC_{429} | — | October 12, 2007 | Kitt Peak | Spacewatch | · | 650 m | MPC · JPL |
| 418004 | 2007 TM_{433} | — | October 10, 2007 | Catalina | CSS | · | 710 m | MPC · JPL |
| 418005 | 2007 TA_{443} | — | October 11, 2007 | Catalina | CSS | · | 4.5 km | MPC · JPL |
| 418006 | 2007 TE_{446} | — | October 8, 2007 | Anderson Mesa | LONEOS | · | 740 m | MPC · JPL |
| 418007 | 2007 TN_{446} | — | October 9, 2007 | Mount Lemmon | Mount Lemmon Survey | · | 760 m | MPC · JPL |
| 418008 | 2007 TW_{450} | — | October 21, 2007 | Catalina | CSS | · | 1.1 km | MPC · JPL |
| 418009 | 2007 TD_{451} | — | October 14, 2007 | Mount Lemmon | Mount Lemmon Survey | · | 780 m | MPC · JPL |
| 418010 | 2007 TH_{451} | — | October 15, 2007 | Mount Lemmon | Mount Lemmon Survey | V | 590 m | MPC · JPL |
| 418011 | 2007 TC_{452} | — | October 14, 2007 | Socorro | LINEAR | · | 890 m | MPC · JPL |
| 418012 | 2007 UZ_{2} | — | October 16, 2007 | 7300 | W. K. Y. Yeung | · | 790 m | MPC · JPL |
| 418013 | 2007 UG_{4} | — | October 18, 2007 | Socorro | LINEAR | PHO | 970 m | MPC · JPL |
| 418014 | 2007 UZ_{6} | — | September 14, 2007 | Mount Lemmon | Mount Lemmon Survey | · | 860 m | MPC · JPL |
| 418015 | 2007 UN_{24} | — | September 15, 2007 | Mount Lemmon | Mount Lemmon Survey | · | 750 m | MPC · JPL |
| 418016 | 2007 UG_{34} | — | October 9, 2007 | Catalina | CSS | · | 1.5 km | MPC · JPL |
| 418017 | 2007 UQ_{42} | — | October 16, 2007 | Mount Lemmon | Mount Lemmon Survey | · | 1.5 km | MPC · JPL |
| 418018 | 2007 UP_{43} | — | September 8, 2007 | Mount Lemmon | Mount Lemmon Survey | · | 750 m | MPC · JPL |
| 418019 | 2007 UA_{52} | — | October 24, 2007 | Mount Lemmon | Mount Lemmon Survey | · | 750 m | MPC · JPL |
| 418020 | 2007 UP_{58} | — | October 30, 2007 | Catalina | CSS | · | 790 m | MPC · JPL |
| 418021 | 2007 UV_{60} | — | October 30, 2007 | Mount Lemmon | Mount Lemmon Survey | · | 670 m | MPC · JPL |
| 418022 | 2007 UW_{75} | — | October 11, 2007 | Kitt Peak | Spacewatch | · | 640 m | MPC · JPL |
| 418023 | 2007 UF_{78} | — | October 17, 2007 | Mount Lemmon | Mount Lemmon Survey | V | 580 m | MPC · JPL |
| 418024 | 2007 UF_{84} | — | October 30, 2007 | Kitt Peak | Spacewatch | MAS | 710 m | MPC · JPL |
| 418025 | 2007 UZ_{87} | — | October 30, 2007 | Kitt Peak | Spacewatch | · | 630 m | MPC · JPL |
| 418026 | 2007 UP_{94} | — | October 31, 2007 | Mount Lemmon | Mount Lemmon Survey | · | 930 m | MPC · JPL |
| 418027 | 2007 UL_{98} | — | October 30, 2007 | Kitt Peak | Spacewatch | · | 960 m | MPC · JPL |
| 418028 | 2007 UG_{102} | — | October 30, 2007 | Kitt Peak | Spacewatch | · | 800 m | MPC · JPL |
| 418029 | 2007 UB_{104} | — | October 30, 2007 | Kitt Peak | Spacewatch | NYS | 1.0 km | MPC · JPL |
| 418030 | 2007 UK_{115} | — | October 31, 2007 | Kitt Peak | Spacewatch | · | 960 m | MPC · JPL |
| 418031 | 2007 UW_{118} | — | October 16, 2007 | Mount Lemmon | Mount Lemmon Survey | · | 770 m | MPC · JPL |
| 418032 | 2007 UQ_{119} | — | October 30, 2007 | Mount Lemmon | Mount Lemmon Survey | · | 520 m | MPC · JPL |
| 418033 | 2007 UV_{134} | — | October 30, 2007 | Kitt Peak | Spacewatch | · | 3.0 km | MPC · JPL |
| 418034 | 2007 VH | — | November 1, 2007 | Calvin-Rehoboth | L. A. Molnar | · | 650 m | MPC · JPL |
| 418035 | 2007 VD_{9} | — | November 2, 2007 | Mount Lemmon | Mount Lemmon Survey | · | 810 m | MPC · JPL |
| 418036 | 2007 VO_{12} | — | October 9, 2007 | Kitt Peak | Spacewatch | · | 750 m | MPC · JPL |
| 418037 | 2007 VV_{17} | — | November 1, 2007 | Mount Lemmon | Mount Lemmon Survey | · | 660 m | MPC · JPL |
| 418038 | 2007 VE_{22} | — | September 25, 2000 | Kitt Peak | Spacewatch | · | 1.2 km | MPC · JPL |
| 418039 | 2007 VG_{26} | — | November 2, 2007 | Mount Lemmon | Mount Lemmon Survey | · | 830 m | MPC · JPL |
| 418040 | 2007 VM_{61} | — | November 1, 2007 | Kitt Peak | Spacewatch | NYS | 790 m | MPC · JPL |
| 418041 | 2007 VL_{75} | — | October 20, 2007 | Kitt Peak | Spacewatch | · | 770 m | MPC · JPL |
| 418042 | 2007 VU_{78} | — | November 3, 2007 | Kitt Peak | Spacewatch | · | 1.3 km | MPC · JPL |
| 418043 | 2007 VF_{83} | — | October 16, 2007 | Kitt Peak | Spacewatch | · | 670 m | MPC · JPL |
| 418044 | 2007 VV_{95} | — | September 9, 2007 | Mount Lemmon | Mount Lemmon Survey | · | 760 m | MPC · JPL |
| 418045 | 2007 VL_{96} | — | September 26, 2007 | Mount Lemmon | Mount Lemmon Survey | · | 810 m | MPC · JPL |
| 418046 | 2007 VV_{106} | — | November 3, 2007 | Kitt Peak | Spacewatch | · | 740 m | MPC · JPL |
| 418047 | 2007 VU_{107} | — | November 3, 2007 | Kitt Peak | Spacewatch | · | 710 m | MPC · JPL |
| 418048 | 2007 VW_{111} | — | November 3, 2007 | Kitt Peak | Spacewatch | · | 800 m | MPC · JPL |
| 418049 | 2007 VX_{115} | — | October 20, 2007 | Mount Lemmon | Mount Lemmon Survey | · | 1.0 km | MPC · JPL |
| 418050 | 2007 VL_{121} | — | November 5, 2007 | Kitt Peak | Spacewatch | · | 980 m | MPC · JPL |
| 418051 | 2007 VQ_{127} | — | March 14, 2005 | Mount Lemmon | Mount Lemmon Survey | · | 3.1 km | MPC · JPL |
| 418052 | 2007 VC_{136} | — | November 4, 2007 | Mount Lemmon | Mount Lemmon Survey | · | 2.2 km | MPC · JPL |
| 418053 | 2007 VV_{141} | — | November 4, 2007 | Kitt Peak | Spacewatch | · | 820 m | MPC · JPL |
| 418054 | 2007 VS_{142} | — | September 18, 2007 | Mount Lemmon | Mount Lemmon Survey | · | 610 m | MPC · JPL |
| 418055 | 2007 VP_{152} | — | November 2, 2007 | Kitt Peak | Spacewatch | · | 790 m | MPC · JPL |
| 418056 | 2007 VU_{154} | — | November 5, 2007 | Kitt Peak | Spacewatch | · | 800 m | MPC · JPL |
| 418057 | 2007 VS_{159} | — | November 5, 2007 | Kitt Peak | Spacewatch | · | 770 m | MPC · JPL |
| 418058 | 2007 VC_{162} | — | November 5, 2007 | Kitt Peak | Spacewatch | · | 930 m | MPC · JPL |
| 418059 | 2007 VB_{164} | — | November 5, 2007 | Kitt Peak | Spacewatch | · | 600 m | MPC · JPL |
| 418060 | 2007 VD_{168} | — | November 5, 2007 | Kitt Peak | Spacewatch | · | 830 m | MPC · JPL |
| 418061 | 2007 VE_{181} | — | October 10, 2007 | Kitt Peak | Spacewatch | · | 640 m | MPC · JPL |
| 418062 | 2007 VA_{189} | — | November 4, 2007 | Kitt Peak | Spacewatch | · | 640 m | MPC · JPL |
| 418063 | 2007 VE_{190} | — | October 21, 2007 | Mount Lemmon | Mount Lemmon Survey | V | 670 m | MPC · JPL |
| 418064 | 2007 VQ_{192} | — | November 28, 2003 | Kitt Peak | Spacewatch | · | 1.1 km | MPC · JPL |
| 418065 | 2007 VO_{194} | — | November 5, 2007 | Mount Lemmon | Mount Lemmon Survey | · | 610 m | MPC · JPL |
| 418066 | 2007 VX_{197} | — | November 8, 2007 | Mount Lemmon | Mount Lemmon Survey | · | 1.3 km | MPC · JPL |
| 418067 | 2007 VJ_{199} | — | November 9, 2007 | Mount Lemmon | Mount Lemmon Survey | · | 740 m | MPC · JPL |
| 418068 | 2007 VY_{200} | — | November 9, 2007 | Mount Lemmon | Mount Lemmon Survey | · | 890 m | MPC · JPL |
| 418069 | 2007 VP_{210} | — | November 9, 2007 | Kitt Peak | Spacewatch | · | 650 m | MPC · JPL |
| 418070 | 2007 VL_{216} | — | November 9, 2007 | Kitt Peak | Spacewatch | · | 810 m | MPC · JPL |
| 418071 | 2007 VH_{221} | — | November 5, 2007 | Kitt Peak | Spacewatch | · | 890 m | MPC · JPL |
| 418072 | 2007 VU_{221} | — | November 12, 2007 | Dauban | Chante-Perdrix | · | 830 m | MPC · JPL |
| 418073 | 2007 VT_{226} | — | October 9, 2007 | Catalina | CSS | · | 920 m | MPC · JPL |
| 418074 | 2007 VT_{235} | — | November 1, 2007 | Kitt Peak | Spacewatch | V | 560 m | MPC · JPL |
| 418075 | 2007 VW_{238} | — | November 13, 2007 | Kitt Peak | Spacewatch | · | 790 m | MPC · JPL |
| 418076 | 2007 VX_{251} | — | November 12, 2007 | Catalina | CSS | · | 840 m | MPC · JPL |
| 418077 | 2007 VQ_{269} | — | November 21, 2007 | Catalina | CSS | · | 1.0 km | MPC · JPL |
| 418078 | 2007 VB_{280} | — | November 14, 2007 | Kitt Peak | Spacewatch | V | 580 m | MPC · JPL |
| 418079 | 2007 VZ_{283} | — | November 14, 2007 | Kitt Peak | Spacewatch | V | 630 m | MPC · JPL |
| 418080 | 2007 VL_{285} | — | November 14, 2007 | Kitt Peak | Spacewatch | · | 1.5 km | MPC · JPL |
| 418081 | 2007 VW_{293} | — | November 13, 2007 | Kitt Peak | Spacewatch | CYB | 5.8 km | MPC · JPL |
| 418082 | 2007 VK_{307} | — | November 3, 2007 | Kitt Peak | Spacewatch | · | 3.5 km | MPC · JPL |
| 418083 | 2007 VV_{307} | — | November 4, 2007 | Kitt Peak | Spacewatch | · | 2.3 km | MPC · JPL |
| 418084 | 2007 VR_{310} | — | November 11, 2007 | Mount Lemmon | Mount Lemmon Survey | · | 910 m | MPC · JPL |
| 418085 | 2007 VC_{311} | — | November 9, 2007 | Mount Lemmon | Mount Lemmon Survey | 3:2 | 4.8 km | MPC · JPL |
| 418086 | 2007 VN_{312} | — | November 2, 2007 | Mount Lemmon | Mount Lemmon Survey | V | 690 m | MPC · JPL |
| 418087 | 2007 VP_{323} | — | November 4, 2007 | Kitt Peak | Spacewatch | · | 600 m | MPC · JPL |
| 418088 | 2007 VN_{326} | — | November 4, 2007 | Kitt Peak | Spacewatch | · | 710 m | MPC · JPL |
| 418089 | 2007 VT_{327} | — | November 20, 2007 | Mount Lemmon | Mount Lemmon Survey | · | 790 m | MPC · JPL |
| 418090 | 2007 VB_{328} | — | November 8, 2007 | Socorro | LINEAR | · | 930 m | MPC · JPL |
| 418091 | 2007 VA_{333} | — | November 9, 2007 | Kitt Peak | Spacewatch | V | 520 m | MPC · JPL |
| 418092 | 2007 VD_{333} | — | November 9, 2007 | Kitt Peak | Spacewatch | CYB | 3.7 km | MPC · JPL |
| 418093 | 2007 VH_{334} | — | September 14, 2007 | Mount Lemmon | Mount Lemmon Survey | NYS | 1.0 km | MPC · JPL |
| 418094 | 2007 WV_{4} | — | November 19, 2007 | Kitt Peak | Spacewatch | APO · PHA | 890 m | MPC · JPL |
| 418095 | 2007 WN_{6} | — | November 17, 2007 | Socorro | LINEAR | V | 810 m | MPC · JPL |
| 418096 | 2007 WN_{8} | — | November 4, 2007 | Kitt Peak | Spacewatch | · | 830 m | MPC · JPL |
| 418097 | 2007 WB_{34} | — | November 4, 2007 | Kitt Peak | Spacewatch | · | 970 m | MPC · JPL |
| 418098 | 2007 WC_{58} | — | November 19, 2007 | Mount Lemmon | Mount Lemmon Survey | · | 1.3 km | MPC · JPL |
| 418099 | 2007 WS_{60} | — | February 9, 2005 | Kitt Peak | Spacewatch | · | 1.1 km | MPC · JPL |
| 418100 | 2007 WZ_{61} | — | November 17, 2007 | Kitt Peak | Spacewatch | · | 920 m | MPC · JPL |

== 418101–418200 ==
back to top

| Designation | | | Discovery | | | Properties | | Ref |
| Permanent | Provisional | Named after | Date | Site | Discoverer(s) | Category | Diam. | Ref |
|---|---|---|---|---|---|---|---|---|
| 418101 | 2007 WG_{63} | — | December 4, 2007 | Catalina | CSS | · | 800 m | MPC · JPL |
| 418102 | 2007 XZ_{3} | — | December 3, 2007 | Kitt Peak | Spacewatch | · | 870 m | MPC · JPL |
| 418103 | 2007 XB_{12} | — | December 4, 2007 | Kitt Peak | Spacewatch | · | 650 m | MPC · JPL |
| 418104 | 2007 XP_{16} | — | November 7, 2007 | Kitt Peak | Spacewatch | · | 740 m | MPC · JPL |
| 418105 | 2007 XJ_{25} | — | December 15, 2007 | La Sagra | OAM | PHO | 1.5 km | MPC · JPL |
| 418106 | 2007 XV_{27} | — | December 14, 2007 | Catalina | CSS | · | 2.0 km | MPC · JPL |
| 418107 | 2007 XC_{43} | — | December 5, 2007 | Kitt Peak | Spacewatch | NYS | 1.0 km | MPC · JPL |
| 418108 | 2007 XS_{50} | — | December 6, 2007 | Mount Lemmon | Mount Lemmon Survey | PHO | 2.1 km | MPC · JPL |
| 418109 | 2007 XV_{56} | — | December 4, 2007 | Kitt Peak | Spacewatch | · | 970 m | MPC · JPL |
| 418110 | 2007 XY_{58} | — | December 14, 2007 | Mount Lemmon | Mount Lemmon Survey | V | 740 m | MPC · JPL |
| 418111 | 2007 YD_{2} | — | December 18, 2007 | Catalina | CSS | · | 560 m | MPC · JPL |
| 418112 | 2007 YU_{4} | — | December 16, 2007 | Kitt Peak | Spacewatch | · | 2.5 km | MPC · JPL |
| 418113 | 2007 YN_{11} | — | December 17, 2007 | Mount Lemmon | Mount Lemmon Survey | · | 840 m | MPC · JPL |
| 418114 | 2007 YT_{12} | — | December 17, 2007 | Mount Lemmon | Mount Lemmon Survey | · | 1.1 km | MPC · JPL |
| 418115 | 2007 YA_{13} | — | December 17, 2007 | Mount Lemmon | Mount Lemmon Survey | · | 1.6 km | MPC · JPL |
| 418116 | 2007 YU_{16} | — | December 4, 2007 | Kitt Peak | Spacewatch | · | 1.0 km | MPC · JPL |
| 418117 | 2007 YJ_{31} | — | December 28, 2007 | Kitt Peak | Spacewatch | · | 850 m | MPC · JPL |
| 418118 | 2007 YM_{32} | — | December 28, 2007 | Kitt Peak | Spacewatch | · | 730 m | MPC · JPL |
| 418119 | 2007 YN_{35} | — | November 18, 2007 | Mount Lemmon | Mount Lemmon Survey | · | 950 m | MPC · JPL |
| 418120 | 2007 YO_{37} | — | December 17, 2007 | Kitt Peak | Spacewatch | · | 1.1 km | MPC · JPL |
| 418121 | 2007 YH_{40} | — | December 30, 2007 | Kitt Peak | Spacewatch | · | 1.1 km | MPC · JPL |
| 418122 | 2007 YQ_{42} | — | December 30, 2007 | Catalina | CSS | · | 1.6 km | MPC · JPL |
| 418123 | 2007 YY_{47} | — | December 15, 2007 | Kitt Peak | Spacewatch | · | 610 m | MPC · JPL |
| 418124 | 2007 YD_{58} | — | December 14, 2007 | Mount Lemmon | Mount Lemmon Survey | (2076) | 880 m | MPC · JPL |
| 418125 | 2007 YW_{61} | — | December 31, 2007 | Mount Lemmon | Mount Lemmon Survey | NYS | 1.1 km | MPC · JPL |
| 418126 | 2007 YD_{64} | — | December 30, 2007 | Mount Lemmon | Mount Lemmon Survey | · | 620 m | MPC · JPL |
| 418127 | 2007 YK_{64} | — | December 16, 2007 | Kitt Peak | Spacewatch | · | 1.2 km | MPC · JPL |
| 418128 | 2007 YY_{64} | — | December 30, 2007 | Mount Lemmon | Mount Lemmon Survey | NYS | 1.1 km | MPC · JPL |
| 418129 | 2007 YE_{69} | — | October 27, 2003 | Kitt Peak | Spacewatch | · | 1.0 km | MPC · JPL |
| 418130 | 2007 YO_{73} | — | December 30, 2007 | Mount Lemmon | Mount Lemmon Survey | ERI | 1.3 km | MPC · JPL |
| 418131 | 2008 AR_{9} | — | December 31, 2007 | Kitt Peak | Spacewatch | · | 1.2 km | MPC · JPL |
| 418132 | 2008 AY_{13} | — | January 10, 2008 | Mount Lemmon | Mount Lemmon Survey | · | 1.2 km | MPC · JPL |
| 418133 | 2008 AN_{25} | — | January 10, 2008 | Mount Lemmon | Mount Lemmon Survey | · | 1.3 km | MPC · JPL |
| 418134 | 2008 AB_{27} | — | December 30, 2007 | Mount Lemmon | Mount Lemmon Survey | · | 900 m | MPC · JPL |
| 418135 | 2008 AG_{33} | — | January 12, 2008 | Mount Lemmon | Mount Lemmon Survey | APO · PHA | 470 m | MPC · JPL |
| 418136 | 2008 AN_{35} | — | January 10, 2008 | Kitt Peak | Spacewatch | MAS | 570 m | MPC · JPL |
| 418137 | 2008 AY_{35} | — | January 10, 2008 | Kitt Peak | Spacewatch | V | 720 m | MPC · JPL |
| 418138 | 2008 AK_{43} | — | March 10, 2005 | Kitt Peak | Spacewatch | · | 770 m | MPC · JPL |
| 418139 | 2008 AC_{44} | — | January 10, 2008 | Kitt Peak | Spacewatch | MAS | 700 m | MPC · JPL |
| 418140 | 2008 AG_{50} | — | January 1, 2008 | Kitt Peak | Spacewatch | · | 940 m | MPC · JPL |
| 418141 | 2008 AR_{52} | — | November 4, 2007 | Mount Lemmon | Mount Lemmon Survey | · | 770 m | MPC · JPL |
| 418142 | 2008 AF_{59} | — | January 11, 2008 | Kitt Peak | Spacewatch | 3:2 | 4.3 km | MPC · JPL |
| 418143 | 2008 AJ_{59} | — | December 30, 2007 | Mount Lemmon | Mount Lemmon Survey | NYS | 1.2 km | MPC · JPL |
| 418144 | 2008 AA_{60} | — | January 11, 2008 | Catalina | CSS | · | 970 m | MPC · JPL |
| 418145 | 2008 AA_{65} | — | January 11, 2008 | Mount Lemmon | Mount Lemmon Survey | · | 1.2 km | MPC · JPL |
| 418146 | 2008 AT_{67} | — | January 11, 2008 | Kitt Peak | Spacewatch | · | 910 m | MPC · JPL |
| 418147 | 2008 AF_{72} | — | December 31, 2007 | Kitt Peak | Spacewatch | · | 890 m | MPC · JPL |
| 418148 | 2008 AK_{78} | — | December 31, 2007 | Mount Lemmon | Mount Lemmon Survey | · | 1.3 km | MPC · JPL |
| 418149 | 2008 AR_{79} | — | December 31, 2007 | Kitt Peak | Spacewatch | V | 590 m | MPC · JPL |
| 418150 | 2008 AL_{84} | — | December 14, 2007 | Mount Lemmon | Mount Lemmon Survey | · | 880 m | MPC · JPL |
| 418151 | 2008 AV_{85} | — | January 13, 2008 | Kitt Peak | Spacewatch | V | 650 m | MPC · JPL |
| 418152 | 2008 AS_{86} | — | January 11, 2008 | Kitt Peak | Spacewatch | · | 1.2 km | MPC · JPL |
| 418153 | 2008 AR_{90} | — | January 13, 2008 | Kitt Peak | Spacewatch | NYS | 960 m | MPC · JPL |
| 418154 | 2008 AZ_{90} | — | January 13, 2008 | Kitt Peak | Spacewatch | · | 560 m | MPC · JPL |
| 418155 | 2008 AS_{94} | — | January 14, 2008 | Kitt Peak | Spacewatch | MAS | 640 m | MPC · JPL |
| 418156 | 2008 AW_{97} | — | January 14, 2008 | Kitt Peak | Spacewatch | · | 1.1 km | MPC · JPL |
| 418157 | 2008 AH_{98} | — | January 1, 2008 | Kitt Peak | Spacewatch | · | 790 m | MPC · JPL |
| 418158 | 2008 AR_{101} | — | December 3, 2007 | Kitt Peak | Spacewatch | · | 860 m | MPC · JPL |
| 418159 | 2008 AB_{106} | — | December 31, 2007 | Kitt Peak | Spacewatch | NYS | 950 m | MPC · JPL |
| 418160 | 2008 AK_{107} | — | January 15, 2008 | Kitt Peak | Spacewatch | V | 750 m | MPC · JPL |
| 418161 | 2008 AU_{107} | — | January 15, 2008 | Kitt Peak | Spacewatch | NYS | 1.1 km | MPC · JPL |
| 418162 | 2008 AY_{111} | — | January 15, 2008 | Kitt Peak | Spacewatch | · | 1.0 km | MPC · JPL |
| 418163 | 2008 AR_{113} | — | April 11, 2005 | Mount Lemmon | Mount Lemmon Survey | · | 800 m | MPC · JPL |
| 418164 | 2008 AK_{115} | — | January 10, 2008 | Mount Lemmon | Mount Lemmon Survey | · | 1.1 km | MPC · JPL |
| 418165 | 2008 AW_{133} | — | January 6, 2008 | Mauna Kea | Mauna Kea | MAS | 560 m | MPC · JPL |
| 418166 | 2008 AY_{137} | — | January 11, 2008 | Mount Lemmon | Mount Lemmon Survey | KON | 2.3 km | MPC · JPL |
| 418167 | 2008 BA_{3} | — | January 16, 2008 | Kitt Peak | Spacewatch | NYS | 940 m | MPC · JPL |
| 418168 | 2008 BA_{4} | — | January 16, 2008 | Kitt Peak | Spacewatch | · | 1.4 km | MPC · JPL |
| 418169 | 2008 BF_{4} | — | January 16, 2008 | Kitt Peak | Spacewatch | · | 870 m | MPC · JPL |
| 418170 | 2008 BD_{12} | — | January 18, 2008 | Kitt Peak | Spacewatch | · | 1.0 km | MPC · JPL |
| 418171 | 2008 BD_{21} | — | January 30, 2008 | Mount Lemmon | Mount Lemmon Survey | · | 1.2 km | MPC · JPL |
| 418172 | 2008 BQ_{21} | — | January 30, 2008 | Mount Lemmon | Mount Lemmon Survey | MAS | 690 m | MPC · JPL |
| 418173 | 2008 BY_{21} | — | January 30, 2008 | Kitt Peak | Spacewatch | · | 1.4 km | MPC · JPL |
| 418174 | 2008 BU_{22} | — | November 19, 2007 | Kitt Peak | Spacewatch | · | 1.7 km | MPC · JPL |
| 418175 | 2008 BW_{27} | — | January 30, 2008 | Catalina | CSS | MAS | 670 m | MPC · JPL |
| 418176 | 2008 BU_{30} | — | January 10, 2008 | Kitt Peak | Spacewatch | NYS | 950 m | MPC · JPL |
| 418177 | 2008 BX_{31} | — | January 30, 2008 | Mount Lemmon | Mount Lemmon Survey | MAS | 780 m | MPC · JPL |
| 418178 | 2008 BQ_{33} | — | January 30, 2008 | Kitt Peak | Spacewatch | · | 1.2 km | MPC · JPL |
| 418179 | 2008 BP_{34} | — | December 5, 2007 | Mount Lemmon | Mount Lemmon Survey | · | 1.1 km | MPC · JPL |
| 418180 | 2008 BU_{34} | — | January 30, 2008 | Mount Lemmon | Mount Lemmon Survey | · | 1.4 km | MPC · JPL |
| 418181 | 2008 BD_{46} | — | January 30, 2008 | Mount Lemmon | Mount Lemmon Survey | V | 620 m | MPC · JPL |
| 418182 | 2008 BK_{51} | — | January 16, 2008 | Kitt Peak | Spacewatch | NYS | 1.1 km | MPC · JPL |
| 418183 | 2008 CC_{2} | — | February 3, 2008 | Mayhill | Lowe, A. | PHO | 1.7 km | MPC · JPL |
| 418184 | 2008 CU_{4} | — | February 2, 2008 | Catalina | CSS | PHO | 1.4 km | MPC · JPL |
| 418185 | 2008 CP_{5} | — | November 8, 2007 | Mount Lemmon | Mount Lemmon Survey | · | 1.3 km | MPC · JPL |
| 418186 | 2008 CE_{8} | — | January 11, 2008 | Mount Lemmon | Mount Lemmon Survey | · | 1 km | MPC · JPL |
| 418187 | 2008 CH_{8} | — | February 2, 2008 | Kitt Peak | Spacewatch | · | 1.4 km | MPC · JPL |
| 418188 | 2008 CS_{12} | — | February 3, 2008 | Kitt Peak | Spacewatch | · | 920 m | MPC · JPL |
| 418189 | 2008 CN_{16} | — | February 3, 2008 | Kitt Peak | Spacewatch | · | 1.1 km | MPC · JPL |
| 418190 | 2008 CO_{24} | — | February 1, 2008 | Kitt Peak | Spacewatch | MAS | 660 m | MPC · JPL |
| 418191 | 2008 CF_{25} | — | February 1, 2008 | Kitt Peak | Spacewatch | · | 1.0 km | MPC · JPL |
| 418192 | 2008 CH_{28} | — | January 16, 2008 | Kitt Peak | Spacewatch | · | 1.1 km | MPC · JPL |
| 418193 | 2008 CV_{32} | — | February 2, 2008 | Kitt Peak | Spacewatch | · | 1.2 km | MPC · JPL |
| 418194 | 2008 CX_{41} | — | January 9, 2008 | Mount Lemmon | Mount Lemmon Survey | V | 680 m | MPC · JPL |
| 418195 | 2008 CR_{43} | — | February 2, 2008 | Kitt Peak | Spacewatch | · | 1.5 km | MPC · JPL |
| 418196 | 2008 CB_{56} | — | December 29, 2003 | Kitt Peak | Spacewatch | · | 1.1 km | MPC · JPL |
| 418197 | 2008 CG_{59} | — | February 7, 2008 | Mount Lemmon | Mount Lemmon Survey | · | 960 m | MPC · JPL |
| 418198 | 2008 CN_{70} | — | February 9, 2008 | Siding Spring | SSS | ATE | 580 m | MPC · JPL |
| 418199 | 2008 CY_{77} | — | February 1, 2008 | Kitt Peak | Spacewatch | · | 1.2 km | MPC · JPL |
| 418200 | 2008 CB_{80} | — | February 7, 2008 | Kitt Peak | Spacewatch | · | 1.1 km | MPC · JPL |

== 418201–418300 ==
back to top

| Designation | | | Discovery | | | Properties | | Ref |
| Permanent | Provisional | Named after | Date | Site | Discoverer(s) | Category | Diam. | Ref |
|---|---|---|---|---|---|---|---|---|
| 418201 | 2008 CZ_{88} | — | February 7, 2008 | Mount Lemmon | Mount Lemmon Survey | · | 1.0 km | MPC · JPL |
| 418202 | 2008 CW_{92} | — | February 8, 2008 | Kitt Peak | Spacewatch | ADE | 2.0 km | MPC · JPL |
| 418203 | 2008 CD_{102} | — | August 21, 2006 | Kitt Peak | Spacewatch | · | 1.1 km | MPC · JPL |
| 418204 | 2008 CE_{110} | — | February 9, 2008 | Kitt Peak | Spacewatch | · | 1.1 km | MPC · JPL |
| 418205 | 2008 CF_{122} | — | January 13, 2008 | Kitt Peak | Spacewatch | · | 1.0 km | MPC · JPL |
| 418206 | 2008 CQ_{127} | — | February 8, 2008 | Kitt Peak | Spacewatch | · | 1.3 km | MPC · JPL |
| 418207 | 2008 CY_{128} | — | October 23, 2003 | Kitt Peak | Spacewatch | NYS | 800 m | MPC · JPL |
| 418208 | 2008 CX_{129} | — | February 8, 2008 | Kitt Peak | Spacewatch | · | 980 m | MPC · JPL |
| 418209 | 2008 CU_{139} | — | February 1, 2008 | Kitt Peak | Spacewatch | · | 1.0 km | MPC · JPL |
| 418210 | 2008 CN_{147} | — | February 9, 2008 | Kitt Peak | Spacewatch | · | 1.2 km | MPC · JPL |
| 418211 | 2008 CF_{154} | — | February 9, 2008 | Kitt Peak | Spacewatch | · | 910 m | MPC · JPL |
| 418212 | 2008 CG_{158} | — | February 9, 2008 | Kitt Peak | Spacewatch | NYS | 1.0 km | MPC · JPL |
| 418213 | 2008 CB_{159} | — | November 13, 2007 | Mount Lemmon | Mount Lemmon Survey | · | 1.1 km | MPC · JPL |
| 418214 | 2008 CT_{159} | — | February 9, 2008 | Kitt Peak | Spacewatch | · | 1.9 km | MPC · JPL |
| 418215 | 2008 CS_{160} | — | June 28, 2001 | Kitt Peak | Spacewatch | (5) | 1.5 km | MPC · JPL |
| 418216 | 2008 CQ_{164} | — | February 10, 2008 | Kitt Peak | Spacewatch | · | 1.1 km | MPC · JPL |
| 418217 | 2008 CO_{166} | — | February 10, 2008 | Črni Vrh | H. Mikuž, B. Mikuž | · | 570 m | MPC · JPL |
| 418218 | 2008 CB_{170} | — | January 11, 2008 | Mount Lemmon | Mount Lemmon Survey | · | 850 m | MPC · JPL |
| 418219 | 2008 CY_{170} | — | February 12, 2008 | Mount Lemmon | Mount Lemmon Survey | · | 1.6 km | MPC · JPL |
| 418220 Kęstutis | 2008 CL_{177} | Kęstutis | February 3, 2008 | Baldone | K. Černis, I. Eglītis | NYS | 1.0 km | MPC · JPL |
| 418221 | 2008 CY_{181} | — | February 11, 2008 | Mount Lemmon | Mount Lemmon Survey | PHO | 1.2 km | MPC · JPL |
| 418222 | 2008 CY_{186} | — | February 2, 2008 | Catalina | CSS | · | 970 m | MPC · JPL |
| 418223 | 2008 CN_{194} | — | February 11, 2008 | Mount Lemmon | Mount Lemmon Survey | · | 2.0 km | MPC · JPL |
| 418224 | 2008 CY_{196} | — | February 8, 2008 | Kitt Peak | Spacewatch | · | 1.1 km | MPC · JPL |
| 418225 | 2008 CJ_{203} | — | February 10, 2008 | Mount Lemmon | Mount Lemmon Survey | · | 1.4 km | MPC · JPL |
| 418226 | 2008 CK_{203} | — | December 11, 2006 | Kitt Peak | Spacewatch | · | 2.0 km | MPC · JPL |
| 418227 | 2008 CC_{204} | — | February 14, 2008 | Mount Lemmon | Mount Lemmon Survey | · | 960 m | MPC · JPL |
| 418228 | 2008 CM_{207} | — | February 13, 2008 | Mount Lemmon | Mount Lemmon Survey | · | 1.2 km | MPC · JPL |
| 418229 | 2008 CD_{208} | — | February 8, 2008 | Kitt Peak | Spacewatch | · | 1.1 km | MPC · JPL |
| 418230 | 2008 CJ_{208} | — | February 10, 2008 | Mount Lemmon | Mount Lemmon Survey | L5 | 8.0 km | MPC · JPL |
| 418231 | 2008 CR_{208} | — | February 13, 2008 | Mount Lemmon | Mount Lemmon Survey | · | 3.2 km | MPC · JPL |
| 418232 | 2008 CA_{209} | — | September 28, 2003 | Kitt Peak | Spacewatch | · | 750 m | MPC · JPL |
| 418233 | 2008 DV | — | February 26, 2008 | Mount Lemmon | Mount Lemmon Survey | APO +1km | 810 m | MPC · JPL |
| 418234 | 2008 DW_{9} | — | February 26, 2008 | Kitt Peak | Spacewatch | · | 880 m | MPC · JPL |
| 418235 | 2008 DA_{20} | — | February 28, 2008 | Kitt Peak | Spacewatch | · | 970 m | MPC · JPL |
| 418236 | 2008 DS_{26} | — | February 27, 2008 | Catalina | CSS | · | 870 m | MPC · JPL |
| 418237 | 2008 DG_{30} | — | February 26, 2008 | Mount Lemmon | Mount Lemmon Survey | · | 840 m | MPC · JPL |
| 418238 | 2008 DR_{30} | — | February 27, 2008 | Kitt Peak | Spacewatch | · | 720 m | MPC · JPL |
| 418239 | 2008 DW_{31} | — | January 11, 2008 | Mount Lemmon | Mount Lemmon Survey | · | 880 m | MPC · JPL |
| 418240 | 2008 DY_{36} | — | February 27, 2008 | Catalina | CSS | PHO | 2.2 km | MPC · JPL |
| 418241 | 2008 DH_{40} | — | February 27, 2008 | Kitt Peak | Spacewatch | H | 440 m | MPC · JPL |
| 418242 | 2008 DO_{40} | — | February 27, 2008 | Kitt Peak | Spacewatch | · | 760 m | MPC · JPL |
| 418243 | 2008 DF_{47} | — | February 28, 2008 | Kitt Peak | Spacewatch | · | 1.1 km | MPC · JPL |
| 418244 | 2008 DN_{56} | — | February 26, 2008 | Socorro | LINEAR | · | 980 m | MPC · JPL |
| 418245 | 2008 DZ_{57} | — | February 28, 2008 | Catalina | CSS | EUN | 3.0 km | MPC · JPL |
| 418246 | 2008 DO_{61} | — | February 28, 2008 | Mount Lemmon | Mount Lemmon Survey | MAS | 730 m | MPC · JPL |
| 418247 | 2008 DT_{64} | — | February 28, 2008 | Mount Lemmon | Mount Lemmon Survey | · | 850 m | MPC · JPL |
| 418248 | 2008 DL_{67} | — | February 29, 2008 | Kitt Peak | Spacewatch | · | 1.4 km | MPC · JPL |
| 418249 | 2008 DO_{72} | — | February 12, 2008 | Kitt Peak | Spacewatch | · | 800 m | MPC · JPL |
| 418250 | 2008 DM_{77} | — | February 28, 2008 | Mount Lemmon | Mount Lemmon Survey | · | 1.3 km | MPC · JPL |
| 418251 | 2008 DS_{80} | — | February 18, 2008 | Mount Lemmon | Mount Lemmon Survey | · | 1.3 km | MPC · JPL |
| 418252 | 2008 DH_{82} | — | February 2, 2008 | Mount Lemmon | Mount Lemmon Survey | · | 1.2 km | MPC · JPL |
| 418253 | 2008 DU_{82} | — | February 28, 2008 | Kitt Peak | Spacewatch | · | 950 m | MPC · JPL |
| 418254 | 2008 DM_{85} | — | February 28, 2008 | Kitt Peak | Spacewatch | · | 990 m | MPC · JPL |
| 418255 | 2008 DF_{88} | — | February 18, 2008 | Mount Lemmon | Mount Lemmon Survey | · | 1.3 km | MPC · JPL |
| 418256 | 2008 DE_{89} | — | February 28, 2008 | Kitt Peak | Spacewatch | NYS | 950 m | MPC · JPL |
| 418257 | 2008 EG_{6} | — | March 3, 2008 | Catalina | CSS | · | 1.3 km | MPC · JPL |
| 418258 | 2008 EF_{7} | — | March 4, 2008 | Kitt Peak | Spacewatch | L5 | 10 km | MPC · JPL |
| 418259 | 2008 EF_{12} | — | March 1, 2008 | Kitt Peak | Spacewatch | · | 1.6 km | MPC · JPL |
| 418260 | 2008 EG_{12} | — | February 2, 2008 | Mount Lemmon | Mount Lemmon Survey | NYS | 1 km | MPC · JPL |
| 418261 | 2008 EL_{14} | — | March 1, 2008 | Kitt Peak | Spacewatch | · | 1.7 km | MPC · JPL |
| 418262 | 2008 EO_{24} | — | March 3, 2008 | Mount Lemmon | Mount Lemmon Survey | · | 1.2 km | MPC · JPL |
| 418263 | 2008 EA_{29} | — | March 4, 2008 | Mount Lemmon | Mount Lemmon Survey | · | 1.8 km | MPC · JPL |
| 418264 | 2008 EW_{29} | — | March 4, 2008 | Purple Mountain | PMO NEO Survey Program | · | 1.3 km | MPC · JPL |
| 418265 | 2008 EA_{32} | — | March 10, 2008 | Catalina | CSS | IEO +1km | 1.8 km | MPC · JPL |
| 418266 | 2008 EH_{33} | — | March 1, 2008 | Kitt Peak | Spacewatch | · | 980 m | MPC · JPL |
| 418267 | 2008 ES_{38} | — | March 1, 2008 | Kitt Peak | Spacewatch | · | 1.4 km | MPC · JPL |
| 418268 | 2008 EO_{44} | — | March 5, 2008 | Kitt Peak | Spacewatch | · | 1.5 km | MPC · JPL |
| 418269 | 2008 EM_{46} | — | March 5, 2008 | Mount Lemmon | Mount Lemmon Survey | · | 1.4 km | MPC · JPL |
| 418270 | 2008 EO_{47} | — | March 5, 2008 | Mount Lemmon | Mount Lemmon Survey | · | 1.3 km | MPC · JPL |
| 418271 | 2008 EW_{52} | — | March 6, 2008 | Kitt Peak | Spacewatch | ADE | 2.0 km | MPC · JPL |
| 418272 | 2008 ES_{58} | — | February 2, 2008 | Mount Lemmon | Mount Lemmon Survey | · | 1.5 km | MPC · JPL |
| 418273 | 2008 EE_{80} | — | March 9, 2008 | Kitt Peak | Spacewatch | · | 1.4 km | MPC · JPL |
| 418274 | 2008 EB_{82} | — | February 2, 2008 | Mount Lemmon | Mount Lemmon Survey | · | 1.5 km | MPC · JPL |
| 418275 | 2008 ED_{86} | — | February 18, 2008 | Mount Lemmon | Mount Lemmon Survey | · | 1.0 km | MPC · JPL |
| 418276 | 2008 EJ_{90} | — | March 2, 2008 | Kitt Peak | Spacewatch | 3:2 | 4.3 km | MPC · JPL |
| 418277 | 2008 EW_{96} | — | March 7, 2008 | Mount Lemmon | Mount Lemmon Survey | MAS | 640 m | MPC · JPL |
| 418278 | 2008 EQ_{107} | — | January 12, 2008 | Kitt Peak | Spacewatch | · | 1.3 km | MPC · JPL |
| 418279 | 2008 EL_{111} | — | March 8, 2008 | Kitt Peak | Spacewatch | · | 2.0 km | MPC · JPL |
| 418280 | 2008 EX_{111} | — | August 29, 2006 | Kitt Peak | Spacewatch | · | 1.1 km | MPC · JPL |
| 418281 | 2008 EC_{113} | — | March 8, 2008 | Kitt Peak | Spacewatch | · | 930 m | MPC · JPL |
| 418282 | 2008 EQ_{120} | — | March 9, 2008 | Kitt Peak | Spacewatch | · | 1.6 km | MPC · JPL |
| 418283 | 2008 EA_{131} | — | March 11, 2008 | Kitt Peak | Spacewatch | · | 1.5 km | MPC · JPL |
| 418284 | 2008 ED_{132} | — | March 11, 2008 | Kitt Peak | Spacewatch | · | 1.5 km | MPC · JPL |
| 418285 | 2008 EC_{137} | — | March 11, 2008 | Kitt Peak | Spacewatch | MAS | 580 m | MPC · JPL |
| 418286 | 2008 EX_{139} | — | February 28, 2008 | Kitt Peak | Spacewatch | · | 1.5 km | MPC · JPL |
| 418287 | 2008 EC_{153} | — | March 11, 2008 | Mount Lemmon | Mount Lemmon Survey | · | 1.7 km | MPC · JPL |
| 418288 | 2008 EU_{155} | — | March 15, 2008 | Mount Lemmon | Mount Lemmon Survey | · | 1.3 km | MPC · JPL |
| 418289 | 2008 EH_{158} | — | March 7, 2008 | Kitt Peak | Spacewatch | · | 1.0 km | MPC · JPL |
| 418290 | 2008 EN_{161} | — | March 8, 2008 | Mount Lemmon | Mount Lemmon Survey | (5) | 1.2 km | MPC · JPL |
| 418291 | 2008 EY_{161} | — | March 10, 2008 | Kitt Peak | Spacewatch | · | 1.3 km | MPC · JPL |
| 418292 | 2008 EN_{166} | — | September 19, 2001 | Apache Point | SDSS | · | 2.3 km | MPC · JPL |
| 418293 | 2008 FF | — | March 25, 2008 | Kitt Peak | Spacewatch | NYS | 1.2 km | MPC · JPL |
| 418294 | 2008 FS_{8} | — | February 10, 2008 | Kitt Peak | Spacewatch | · | 770 m | MPC · JPL |
| 418295 | 2008 FA_{11} | — | October 20, 2006 | Kitt Peak | Spacewatch | · | 1.0 km | MPC · JPL |
| 418296 | 2008 FA_{25} | — | March 12, 2008 | Mount Lemmon | Mount Lemmon Survey | · | 1.3 km | MPC · JPL |
| 418297 | 2008 FU_{28} | — | February 7, 2008 | Kitt Peak | Spacewatch | · | 1.1 km | MPC · JPL |
| 418298 | 2008 FZ_{28} | — | March 28, 2008 | Kitt Peak | Spacewatch | · | 930 m | MPC · JPL |
| 418299 | 2008 FD_{37} | — | February 13, 2008 | Mount Lemmon | Mount Lemmon Survey | · | 1.9 km | MPC · JPL |
| 418300 | 2008 FT_{38} | — | March 28, 2008 | Kitt Peak | Spacewatch | · | 980 m | MPC · JPL |

== 418301–418400 ==
back to top

| Designation | | | Discovery | | | Properties | | Ref |
| Permanent | Provisional | Named after | Date | Site | Discoverer(s) | Category | Diam. | Ref |
|---|---|---|---|---|---|---|---|---|
| 418301 | 2008 FJ_{40} | — | March 28, 2008 | Kitt Peak | Spacewatch | · | 1.2 km | MPC · JPL |
| 418302 | 2008 FO_{40} | — | March 13, 2008 | Kitt Peak | Spacewatch | H | 450 m | MPC · JPL |
| 418303 | 2008 FS_{42} | — | February 27, 2008 | Kitt Peak | Spacewatch | · | 950 m | MPC · JPL |
| 418304 | 2008 FU_{49} | — | March 12, 2008 | Kitt Peak | Spacewatch | · | 940 m | MPC · JPL |
| 418305 | 2008 FU_{51} | — | March 28, 2008 | Mount Lemmon | Mount Lemmon Survey | · | 1.3 km | MPC · JPL |
| 418306 | 2008 FK_{53} | — | March 28, 2008 | Mount Lemmon | Mount Lemmon Survey | · | 1.0 km | MPC · JPL |
| 418307 | 2008 FV_{53} | — | March 28, 2008 | Mount Lemmon | Mount Lemmon Survey | · | 1.4 km | MPC · JPL |
| 418308 | 2008 FL_{56} | — | March 12, 2008 | Mount Lemmon | Mount Lemmon Survey | · | 1.3 km | MPC · JPL |
| 418309 | 2008 FJ_{57} | — | August 31, 2005 | Palomar | NEAT | · | 2.0 km | MPC · JPL |
| 418310 | 2008 FR_{66} | — | March 28, 2008 | Kitt Peak | Spacewatch | (5) | 1.3 km | MPC · JPL |
| 418311 | 2008 FN_{70} | — | March 28, 2008 | Kitt Peak | Spacewatch | · | 1.5 km | MPC · JPL |
| 418312 | 2008 FF_{88} | — | March 28, 2008 | Kitt Peak | Spacewatch | H | 420 m | MPC · JPL |
| 418313 | 2008 FN_{96} | — | March 29, 2008 | Kitt Peak | Spacewatch | · | 1.1 km | MPC · JPL |
| 418314 | 2008 FO_{97} | — | February 27, 2008 | Mount Lemmon | Mount Lemmon Survey | · | 1.0 km | MPC · JPL |
| 418315 | 2008 FY_{98} | — | March 30, 2008 | Kitt Peak | Spacewatch | BRG | 1.3 km | MPC · JPL |
| 418316 | 2008 FN_{99} | — | March 30, 2008 | Kitt Peak | Spacewatch | · | 2.1 km | MPC · JPL |
| 418317 | 2008 FO_{99} | — | March 30, 2008 | Kitt Peak | Spacewatch | · | 1.3 km | MPC · JPL |
| 418318 | 2008 FZ_{101} | — | May 19, 2004 | Kitt Peak | Spacewatch | MAR | 990 m | MPC · JPL |
| 418319 | 2008 FB_{104} | — | March 30, 2008 | Kitt Peak | Spacewatch | · | 2.0 km | MPC · JPL |
| 418320 | 2008 FR_{104} | — | March 30, 2008 | Kitt Peak | Spacewatch | · | 2.0 km | MPC · JPL |
| 418321 | 2008 FS_{111} | — | March 31, 2008 | Kitt Peak | Spacewatch | · | 2.2 km | MPC · JPL |
| 418322 | 2008 FW_{116} | — | November 12, 2006 | Mount Lemmon | Mount Lemmon Survey | · | 920 m | MPC · JPL |
| 418323 | 2008 FP_{118} | — | March 31, 2008 | Mount Lemmon | Mount Lemmon Survey | NYS | 1.1 km | MPC · JPL |
| 418324 | 2008 FU_{124} | — | March 30, 2008 | Kitt Peak | Spacewatch | · | 1.8 km | MPC · JPL |
| 418325 | 2008 FD_{127} | — | March 31, 2008 | Mount Lemmon | Mount Lemmon Survey | · | 1.9 km | MPC · JPL |
| 418326 | 2008 FO_{128} | — | March 28, 2008 | Mount Lemmon | Mount Lemmon Survey | · | 1.6 km | MPC · JPL |
| 418327 | 2008 FP_{128} | — | March 28, 2008 | Mount Lemmon | Mount Lemmon Survey | · | 1.5 km | MPC · JPL |
| 418328 | 2008 FZ_{134} | — | March 30, 2008 | Kitt Peak | Spacewatch | L5 | 8.0 km | MPC · JPL |
| 418329 | 2008 GC_{3} | — | April 7, 2008 | Catalina | CSS | EUN | 1.2 km | MPC · JPL |
| 418330 | 2008 GF_{4} | — | April 7, 2008 | Grove Creek | Tozzi, F. | · | 2.4 km | MPC · JPL |
| 418331 | 2008 GH_{6} | — | March 10, 2008 | Mount Lemmon | Mount Lemmon Survey | · | 1.9 km | MPC · JPL |
| 418332 | 2008 GE_{7} | — | April 1, 2008 | Kitt Peak | Spacewatch | MAS | 760 m | MPC · JPL |
| 418333 | 2008 GH_{7} | — | April 1, 2008 | Kitt Peak | Spacewatch | · | 1.0 km | MPC · JPL |
| 418334 | 2008 GQ_{7} | — | April 1, 2008 | Kitt Peak | Spacewatch | L5 | 8.0 km | MPC · JPL |
| 418335 | 2008 GK_{9} | — | April 1, 2008 | Kitt Peak | Spacewatch | · | 4.8 km | MPC · JPL |
| 418336 | 2008 GZ_{13} | — | April 3, 2008 | Mount Lemmon | Mount Lemmon Survey | · | 2.0 km | MPC · JPL |
| 418337 | 2008 GS_{16} | — | April 3, 2008 | Mount Lemmon | Mount Lemmon Survey | · | 1.6 km | MPC · JPL |
| 418338 | 2008 GD_{21} | — | April 1, 2008 | Mount Lemmon | Mount Lemmon Survey | H | 690 m | MPC · JPL |
| 418339 | 2008 GL_{21} | — | April 4, 2008 | Mayhill | Dillon, W. G. | NYS | 1.3 km | MPC · JPL |
| 418340 | 2008 GZ_{34} | — | April 3, 2008 | Mount Lemmon | Mount Lemmon Survey | · | 1.8 km | MPC · JPL |
| 418341 | 2008 GR_{35} | — | March 30, 2008 | Kitt Peak | Spacewatch | L5 | 9.2 km | MPC · JPL |
| 418342 | 2008 GF_{37} | — | April 3, 2008 | Kitt Peak | Spacewatch | EUN | 930 m | MPC · JPL |
| 418343 | 2008 GG_{46} | — | September 21, 2001 | Apache Point | SDSS | L5 · (291316) | 9.1 km | MPC · JPL |
| 418344 | 2008 GJ_{48} | — | April 5, 2008 | Kitt Peak | Spacewatch | V | 700 m | MPC · JPL |
| 418345 | 2008 GB_{61} | — | April 5, 2008 | Mount Lemmon | Mount Lemmon Survey | · | 1.2 km | MPC · JPL |
| 418346 | 2008 GX_{62} | — | April 5, 2008 | Kitt Peak | Spacewatch | H | 450 m | MPC · JPL |
| 418347 | 2008 GN_{69} | — | April 6, 2008 | Mount Lemmon | Mount Lemmon Survey | · | 2.8 km | MPC · JPL |
| 418348 | 2008 GL_{76} | — | April 7, 2008 | Mount Lemmon | Mount Lemmon Survey | · | 1.9 km | MPC · JPL |
| 418349 | 2008 GM_{81} | — | March 5, 2008 | Mount Lemmon | Mount Lemmon Survey | · | 1.4 km | MPC · JPL |
| 418350 | 2008 GB_{88} | — | April 6, 2008 | Kitt Peak | Spacewatch | · | 1.9 km | MPC · JPL |
| 418351 | 2008 GL_{90} | — | April 6, 2008 | Mount Lemmon | Mount Lemmon Survey | MRX | 1.0 km | MPC · JPL |
| 418352 | 2008 GC_{93} | — | March 29, 2008 | Catalina | CSS | EUN | 1.2 km | MPC · JPL |
| 418353 | 2008 GC_{97} | — | September 24, 2005 | Kitt Peak | Spacewatch | AGN | 1.1 km | MPC · JPL |
| 418354 | 2008 GD_{97} | — | April 4, 2008 | Kitt Peak | Spacewatch | · | 1.0 km | MPC · JPL |
| 418355 | 2008 GM_{98} | — | March 4, 2008 | Mount Lemmon | Mount Lemmon Survey | · | 1.4 km | MPC · JPL |
| 418356 | 2008 GV_{100} | — | March 28, 2008 | Mount Lemmon | Mount Lemmon Survey | · | 1.1 km | MPC · JPL |
| 418357 | 2008 GX_{100} | — | April 9, 2008 | Kitt Peak | Spacewatch | · | 1.6 km | MPC · JPL |
| 418358 | 2008 GA_{102} | — | April 6, 2008 | Kitt Peak | Spacewatch | · | 1.4 km | MPC · JPL |
| 418359 | 2008 GL_{104} | — | March 28, 2008 | Kitt Peak | Spacewatch | · | 1.5 km | MPC · JPL |
| 418360 | 2008 GT_{107} | — | April 12, 2008 | Kitt Peak | Spacewatch | DOR | 2.5 km | MPC · JPL |
| 418361 | 2008 GQ_{111} | — | April 8, 2008 | Socorro | LINEAR | H | 410 m | MPC · JPL |
| 418362 | 2008 GP_{115} | — | March 15, 2008 | Kitt Peak | Spacewatch | (5) | 1.2 km | MPC · JPL |
| 418363 | 2008 GV_{117} | — | April 11, 2008 | Catalina | CSS | · | 1.9 km | MPC · JPL |
| 418364 | 2008 GY_{117} | — | April 11, 2008 | Mount Lemmon | Mount Lemmon Survey | · | 1.4 km | MPC · JPL |
| 418365 | 2008 GT_{119} | — | April 3, 2008 | Mount Lemmon | Mount Lemmon Survey | MAR | 1.4 km | MPC · JPL |
| 418366 | 2008 GD_{123} | — | March 30, 2008 | Kitt Peak | Spacewatch | · | 1.2 km | MPC · JPL |
| 418367 | 2008 GB_{127} | — | April 14, 2008 | Mount Lemmon | Mount Lemmon Survey | · | 2.0 km | MPC · JPL |
| 418368 | 2008 GL_{127} | — | April 14, 2008 | Mount Lemmon | Mount Lemmon Survey | H | 570 m | MPC · JPL |
| 418369 | 2008 GO_{132} | — | April 13, 2008 | Mount Lemmon | Mount Lemmon Survey | MAR | 1.2 km | MPC · JPL |
| 418370 | 2008 GJ_{133} | — | April 3, 2008 | Kitt Peak | Spacewatch | · | 1.6 km | MPC · JPL |
| 418371 | 2008 GU_{133} | — | April 12, 2008 | Catalina | CSS | · | 2.1 km | MPC · JPL |
| 418372 | 2008 GB_{138} | — | February 28, 2008 | Kitt Peak | Spacewatch | L5 | 8.9 km | MPC · JPL |
| 418373 | 2008 GX_{138} | — | April 6, 2008 | Kitt Peak | Spacewatch | L5 | 7.3 km | MPC · JPL |
| 418374 | 2008 GM_{141} | — | April 14, 2008 | Mount Lemmon | Mount Lemmon Survey | L5 | 8.6 km | MPC · JPL |
| 418375 | 2008 GA_{145} | — | December 20, 2007 | Kitt Peak | Spacewatch | ADE | 2.6 km | MPC · JPL |
| 418376 | 2008 GG_{146} | — | April 14, 2008 | Mount Lemmon | Mount Lemmon Survey | · | 1.6 km | MPC · JPL |
| 418377 | 2008 HA_{5} | — | March 6, 2008 | Kitt Peak | Spacewatch | · | 1.2 km | MPC · JPL |
| 418378 | 2008 HC_{5} | — | April 24, 2008 | Kitt Peak | Spacewatch | · | 1.2 km | MPC · JPL |
| 418379 | 2008 HK_{6} | — | April 24, 2008 | Kitt Peak | Spacewatch | · | 1.1 km | MPC · JPL |
| 418380 | 2008 HF_{9} | — | April 24, 2008 | Kitt Peak | Spacewatch | · | 1.1 km | MPC · JPL |
| 418381 | 2008 HX_{15} | — | April 25, 2008 | Kitt Peak | Spacewatch | MAR | 1.2 km | MPC · JPL |
| 418382 | 2008 HE_{16} | — | April 25, 2008 | Kitt Peak | Spacewatch | · | 1.4 km | MPC · JPL |
| 418383 | 2008 HM_{17} | — | April 26, 2008 | Kitt Peak | Spacewatch | · | 2.1 km | MPC · JPL |
| 418384 | 2008 HJ_{21} | — | March 15, 2008 | Mount Lemmon | Mount Lemmon Survey | · | 1.3 km | MPC · JPL |
| 418385 | 2008 HQ_{22} | — | April 15, 2008 | Mount Lemmon | Mount Lemmon Survey | · | 1.5 km | MPC · JPL |
| 418386 | 2008 HK_{29} | — | April 28, 2008 | Mount Lemmon | Mount Lemmon Survey | H | 430 m | MPC · JPL |
| 418387 | 2008 HL_{34} | — | April 27, 2008 | Kitt Peak | Spacewatch | · | 1.1 km | MPC · JPL |
| 418388 | 2008 HE_{45} | — | April 28, 2008 | Kitt Peak | Spacewatch | · | 1.0 km | MPC · JPL |
| 418389 | 2008 HH_{57} | — | April 30, 2008 | Kitt Peak | Spacewatch | · | 1.6 km | MPC · JPL |
| 418390 | 2008 HV_{57} | — | April 30, 2008 | Kitt Peak | Spacewatch | · | 2.1 km | MPC · JPL |
| 418391 | 2008 HP_{60} | — | April 28, 2008 | Mount Lemmon | Mount Lemmon Survey | EUN | 1.7 km | MPC · JPL |
| 418392 | 2008 HT_{66} | — | April 16, 2008 | Mount Lemmon | Mount Lemmon Survey | H | 610 m | MPC · JPL |
| 418393 | 2008 HG_{67} | — | April 28, 2008 | Kitt Peak | Spacewatch | L5 | 9.9 km | MPC · JPL |
| 418394 | 2008 HO_{69} | — | April 29, 2008 | Mount Lemmon | Mount Lemmon Survey | L5 | 9.2 km | MPC · JPL |
| 418395 | 2008 HG_{70} | — | April 16, 2008 | Mount Lemmon | Mount Lemmon Survey | · | 2.1 km | MPC · JPL |
| 418396 | 2008 JL_{4} | — | May 1, 2008 | Kitt Peak | Spacewatch | · | 2.3 km | MPC · JPL |
| 418397 | 2008 JS_{4} | — | May 2, 2008 | Catalina | CSS | · | 2.7 km | MPC · JPL |
| 418398 | 2008 JJ_{21} | — | April 7, 2008 | Catalina | CSS | · | 1.8 km | MPC · JPL |
| 418399 | 2008 JT_{22} | — | May 7, 2008 | Kitt Peak | Spacewatch | L5 | 10 km | MPC · JPL |
| 418400 | 2008 JL_{27} | — | May 8, 2008 | Kitt Peak | Spacewatch | L5 | 10 km | MPC · JPL |

== 418401–418500 ==
back to top

| Designation | | | Discovery | | | Properties | | Ref |
| Permanent | Provisional | Named after | Date | Site | Discoverer(s) | Category | Diam. | Ref |
|---|---|---|---|---|---|---|---|---|
| 418401 | 2008 JP_{32} | — | April 29, 2008 | Kitt Peak | Spacewatch | · | 1.4 km | MPC · JPL |
| 418402 | 2008 KH_{7} | — | May 26, 2008 | Kitt Peak | Spacewatch | · | 4.3 km | MPC · JPL |
| 418403 | 2008 KD_{12} | — | May 12, 2008 | Siding Spring | SSS | H | 630 m | MPC · JPL |
| 418404 | 2008 KX_{16} | — | May 1, 2008 | Kitt Peak | Spacewatch | · | 1.7 km | MPC · JPL |
| 418405 | 2008 KB_{18} | — | May 28, 2008 | Kitt Peak | Spacewatch | · | 1.4 km | MPC · JPL |
| 418406 | 2008 KF_{18} | — | April 16, 2008 | Mount Lemmon | Mount Lemmon Survey | · | 2.0 km | MPC · JPL |
| 418407 | 2008 KG_{21} | — | May 28, 2008 | Kitt Peak | Spacewatch | · | 1.3 km | MPC · JPL |
| 418408 | 2008 KD_{29} | — | April 14, 2008 | Mount Lemmon | Mount Lemmon Survey | · | 2.0 km | MPC · JPL |
| 418409 | 2008 KC_{31} | — | May 29, 2008 | Kitt Peak | Spacewatch | · | 1.4 km | MPC · JPL |
| 418410 | 2008 LL | — | June 2, 2008 | Mount Lemmon | Mount Lemmon Survey | H | 640 m | MPC · JPL |
| 418411 | 2008 LH_{3} | — | June 1, 2008 | Kitt Peak | Spacewatch | · | 1.8 km | MPC · JPL |
| 418412 | 2008 LP_{5} | — | May 28, 2008 | Kitt Peak | Spacewatch | · | 1.5 km | MPC · JPL |
| 418413 | 2008 LU_{8} | — | April 4, 2008 | Kitt Peak | Spacewatch | · | 1.6 km | MPC · JPL |
| 418414 | 2008 LH_{10} | — | May 3, 2008 | Mount Lemmon | Mount Lemmon Survey | MAR | 1.2 km | MPC · JPL |
| 418415 | 2008 LV_{10} | — | May 3, 2008 | Mount Lemmon | Mount Lemmon Survey | · | 1.8 km | MPC · JPL |
| 418416 | 2008 LV_{16} | — | June 15, 2008 | Catalina | CSS | APO · PHA | 310 m | MPC · JPL |
| 418417 | 2008 LV_{17} | — | June 4, 2008 | Kitt Peak | Spacewatch | · | 1.7 km | MPC · JPL |
| 418418 | 2008 LW_{17} | — | June 6, 2008 | Kitt Peak | Spacewatch | TIR | 3.7 km | MPC · JPL |
| 418419 Lacanto | 2008 MT_{1} | Lacanto | June 28, 2008 | Vicques | M. Ory | · | 4.4 km | MPC · JPL |
| 418420 | 2008 MK_{5} | — | June 27, 2008 | Siding Spring | SSS | · | 2.6 km | MPC · JPL |
| 418421 | 2008 NB_{4} | — | July 11, 2008 | Siding Spring | SSS | · | 2.2 km | MPC · JPL |
| 418422 | 2008 NA_{5} | — | July 10, 2008 | Siding Spring | SSS | · | 1.6 km | MPC · JPL |
| 418423 | 2008 NK_{5} | — | July 1, 2008 | Catalina | CSS | · | 2.8 km | MPC · JPL |
| 418424 | 2008 NM_{5} | — | July 8, 2008 | Mount Lemmon | Mount Lemmon Survey | · | 2.5 km | MPC · JPL |
| 418425 | 2008 OR | — | July 25, 2008 | Pla D'Arguines | R. Ferrando | · | 2.8 km | MPC · JPL |
| 418426 | 2008 OQ_{3} | — | July 25, 2008 | Siding Spring | SSS | · | 2.7 km | MPC · JPL |
| 418427 | 2008 OM_{7} | — | July 29, 2008 | Mount Lemmon | Mount Lemmon Survey | · | 3.5 km | MPC · JPL |
| 418428 | 2008 OF_{11} | — | July 31, 2008 | La Sagra | OAM | · | 2.6 km | MPC · JPL |
| 418429 | 2008 OC_{17} | — | July 29, 2008 | Kitt Peak | Spacewatch | H | 590 m | MPC · JPL |
| 418430 | 2008 OP_{22} | — | July 29, 2008 | Kitt Peak | Spacewatch | · | 1.7 km | MPC · JPL |
| 418431 | 2008 OO_{24} | — | July 30, 2008 | Kitt Peak | Spacewatch | · | 2.3 km | MPC · JPL |
| 418432 | 2008 OF_{25} | — | July 30, 2008 | Catalina | CSS | BRA | 1.8 km | MPC · JPL |
| 418433 | 2008 PV | — | March 11, 2003 | Palomar | NEAT | · | 1.6 km | MPC · JPL |
| 418434 | 2008 PX_{2} | — | August 3, 2008 | Dauban | Kugel, F. | · | 2.2 km | MPC · JPL |
| 418435 | 2008 PE_{9} | — | February 6, 2002 | Kitt Peak | Spacewatch | · | 2.3 km | MPC · JPL |
| 418436 | 2008 PG_{10} | — | August 5, 2008 | La Sagra | OAM | · | 2.3 km | MPC · JPL |
| 418437 | 2008 PX_{10} | — | July 30, 2008 | Catalina | CSS | · | 3.7 km | MPC · JPL |
| 418438 | 2008 PX_{21} | — | August 6, 2008 | Siding Spring | SSS | · | 3.5 km | MPC · JPL |
| 418439 | 2008 QH_{5} | — | August 22, 2008 | Kitt Peak | Spacewatch | · | 2.9 km | MPC · JPL |
| 418440 | 2008 QM_{5} | — | August 22, 2008 | Kitt Peak | Spacewatch | EOS | 2.1 km | MPC · JPL |
| 418441 | 2008 QS_{8} | — | August 25, 2008 | La Sagra | OAM | · | 2.0 km | MPC · JPL |
| 418442 | 2008 QF_{11} | — | August 22, 2008 | Kitt Peak | Spacewatch | · | 3.8 km | MPC · JPL |
| 418443 | 2008 QC_{18} | — | August 28, 2008 | La Sagra | OAM | · | 2.8 km | MPC · JPL |
| 418444 | 2008 QM_{23} | — | August 29, 2008 | Taunus | E. Schwab, R. Kling | HYG | 2.6 km | MPC · JPL |
| 418445 | 2008 QN_{26} | — | September 22, 2003 | Anderson Mesa | LONEOS | · | 2.1 km | MPC · JPL |
| 418446 | 2008 QA_{34} | — | August 29, 2008 | La Sagra | OAM | · | 3.7 km | MPC · JPL |
| 418447 | 2008 QW_{43} | — | August 23, 2008 | Siding Spring | SSS | · | 4.0 km | MPC · JPL |
| 418448 | 2008 QN_{45} | — | August 30, 2008 | Socorro | LINEAR | · | 2.9 km | MPC · JPL |
| 418449 | 2008 QR_{46} | — | August 26, 2008 | Socorro | LINEAR | · | 3.3 km | MPC · JPL |
| 418450 | 2008 QN_{47} | — | August 23, 2008 | Kitt Peak | Spacewatch | THM | 2.3 km | MPC · JPL |
| 418451 | 2008 QY_{47} | — | August 24, 2008 | Kitt Peak | Spacewatch | EOS | 1.7 km | MPC · JPL |
| 418452 | 2008 RN_{5} | — | September 2, 2008 | Kitt Peak | Spacewatch | · | 4.8 km | MPC · JPL |
| 418453 | 2008 RS_{5} | — | September 2, 2008 | Kitt Peak | Spacewatch | THM | 1.7 km | MPC · JPL |
| 418454 | 2008 RL_{9} | — | September 3, 2008 | Kitt Peak | Spacewatch | · | 2.4 km | MPC · JPL |
| 418455 | 2008 RB_{15} | — | August 24, 2008 | Kitt Peak | Spacewatch | · | 2.4 km | MPC · JPL |
| 418456 | 2008 RK_{24} | — | September 5, 2008 | Socorro | LINEAR | · | 3.3 km | MPC · JPL |
| 418457 | 2008 RK_{28} | — | September 2, 2008 | Kitt Peak | Spacewatch | · | 2.7 km | MPC · JPL |
| 418458 | 2008 RY_{32} | — | September 2, 2008 | Kitt Peak | Spacewatch | · | 2.0 km | MPC · JPL |
| 418459 | 2008 RP_{37} | — | September 2, 2008 | Kitt Peak | Spacewatch | · | 3.2 km | MPC · JPL |
| 418460 | 2008 RA_{40} | — | September 2, 2008 | Kitt Peak | Spacewatch | · | 2.5 km | MPC · JPL |
| 418461 | 2008 RR_{40} | — | September 2, 2008 | Kitt Peak | Spacewatch | · | 3.7 km | MPC · JPL |
| 418462 | 2008 RU_{41} | — | September 2, 2008 | Kitt Peak | Spacewatch | · | 2.3 km | MPC · JPL |
| 418463 | 2008 RR_{42} | — | September 2, 2008 | Kitt Peak | Spacewatch | · | 2.8 km | MPC · JPL |
| 418464 | 2008 RX_{46} | — | September 2, 2008 | Kitt Peak | Spacewatch | · | 1.9 km | MPC · JPL |
| 418465 | 2008 RD_{49} | — | September 21, 2003 | Kitt Peak | Spacewatch | · | 2.6 km | MPC · JPL |
| 418466 | 2008 RT_{52} | — | July 29, 2008 | Mount Lemmon | Mount Lemmon Survey | · | 2.3 km | MPC · JPL |
| 418467 | 2008 RM_{54} | — | September 3, 2008 | Kitt Peak | Spacewatch | · | 2.1 km | MPC · JPL |
| 418468 | 2008 RT_{56} | — | September 3, 2008 | Kitt Peak | Spacewatch | · | 2.2 km | MPC · JPL |
| 418469 | 2008 RD_{64} | — | September 4, 2008 | Kitt Peak | Spacewatch | · | 3.5 km | MPC · JPL |
| 418470 | 2008 RV_{85} | — | September 5, 2008 | Kitt Peak | Spacewatch | VER | 2.7 km | MPC · JPL |
| 418471 | 2008 RY_{85} | — | September 5, 2008 | Kitt Peak | Spacewatch | · | 2.7 km | MPC · JPL |
| 418472 | 2008 RT_{87} | — | September 5, 2008 | Kitt Peak | Spacewatch | · | 2.8 km | MPC · JPL |
| 418473 | 2008 RZ_{87} | — | September 5, 2008 | Kitt Peak | Spacewatch | · | 3.7 km | MPC · JPL |
| 418474 | 2008 RA_{88} | — | September 5, 2008 | Kitt Peak | Spacewatch | · | 1.9 km | MPC · JPL |
| 418475 | 2008 RQ_{92} | — | September 6, 2008 | Kitt Peak | Spacewatch | · | 2.2 km | MPC · JPL |
| 418476 | 2008 RZ_{92} | — | September 6, 2008 | Kitt Peak | Spacewatch | EOS | 1.6 km | MPC · JPL |
| 418477 | 2008 RW_{93} | — | September 6, 2008 | Kitt Peak | Spacewatch | EOS | 1.9 km | MPC · JPL |
| 418478 | 2008 RG_{96} | — | July 30, 2008 | Kitt Peak | Spacewatch | LIX | 3.5 km | MPC · JPL |
| 418479 | 2008 RQ_{96} | — | September 7, 2008 | Mount Lemmon | Mount Lemmon Survey | · | 3.3 km | MPC · JPL |
| 418480 | 2008 RH_{102} | — | September 3, 2008 | Kitt Peak | Spacewatch | · | 2.5 km | MPC · JPL |
| 418481 | 2008 RF_{104} | — | September 5, 2008 | Kitt Peak | Spacewatch | LIX | 3.6 km | MPC · JPL |
| 418482 | 2008 RN_{104} | — | September 6, 2008 | Mount Lemmon | Mount Lemmon Survey | EOS | 1.7 km | MPC · JPL |
| 418483 | 2008 RQ_{104} | — | September 6, 2008 | Kitt Peak | Spacewatch | THM | 1.8 km | MPC · JPL |
| 418484 | 2008 RF_{106} | — | September 6, 2008 | Siding Spring | SSS | · | 3.1 km | MPC · JPL |
| 418485 | 2008 RT_{106} | — | September 7, 2008 | Mount Lemmon | Mount Lemmon Survey | · | 2.7 km | MPC · JPL |
| 418486 | 2008 RJ_{111} | — | September 4, 2008 | Kitt Peak | Spacewatch | · | 2.9 km | MPC · JPL |
| 418487 | 2008 RT_{112} | — | September 5, 2008 | Kitt Peak | Spacewatch | (1298) | 2.4 km | MPC · JPL |
| 418488 | 2008 RM_{114} | — | September 6, 2008 | Mount Lemmon | Mount Lemmon Survey | · | 4.4 km | MPC · JPL |
| 418489 | 2008 RA_{117} | — | September 7, 2008 | Mount Lemmon | Mount Lemmon Survey | VER | 2.5 km | MPC · JPL |
| 418490 | 2008 RG_{118} | — | September 9, 2008 | Mount Lemmon | Mount Lemmon Survey | EOS | 1.6 km | MPC · JPL |
| 418491 | 2008 RG_{122} | — | September 3, 2008 | Kitt Peak | Spacewatch | · | 3.7 km | MPC · JPL |
| 418492 | 2008 RG_{124} | — | September 6, 2008 | Kitt Peak | Spacewatch | EOS | 1.6 km | MPC · JPL |
| 418493 | 2008 RV_{129} | — | September 8, 2008 | Kitt Peak | Spacewatch | KOR | 1.6 km | MPC · JPL |
| 418494 | 2008 RB_{131} | — | September 7, 2008 | Mount Lemmon | Mount Lemmon Survey | EOS | 1.6 km | MPC · JPL |
| 418495 | 2008 RF_{135} | — | September 2, 2008 | Kitt Peak | Spacewatch | · | 2.0 km | MPC · JPL |
| 418496 | 2008 RG_{140} | — | September 8, 2008 | Bergisch Gladbach | W. Bickel | · | 2.1 km | MPC · JPL |
| 418497 | 2008 RH_{141} | — | January 31, 2006 | Kitt Peak | Spacewatch | THM | 2.9 km | MPC · JPL |
| 418498 | 2008 RR_{143} | — | September 6, 2008 | Kitt Peak | Spacewatch | · | 3.2 km | MPC · JPL |
| 418499 | 2008 RZ_{144} | — | September 5, 2008 | Kitt Peak | Spacewatch | EOS | 1.7 km | MPC · JPL |
| 418500 | 2008 RD_{145} | — | September 6, 2008 | Kitt Peak | Spacewatch | · | 1.7 km | MPC · JPL |

== 418501–418600 ==
back to top

| Designation | | | Discovery | | | Properties | | Ref |
| Permanent | Provisional | Named after | Date | Site | Discoverer(s) | Category | Diam. | Ref |
|---|---|---|---|---|---|---|---|---|
| 418501 | 2008 RF_{146} | — | September 6, 2008 | Mount Lemmon | Mount Lemmon Survey | · | 3.7 km | MPC · JPL |
| 418502 | 2008 RK_{146} | — | September 6, 2008 | Kitt Peak | Spacewatch | · | 2.2 km | MPC · JPL |
| 418503 | 2008 RL_{146} | — | September 7, 2008 | Mount Lemmon | Mount Lemmon Survey | · | 1.7 km | MPC · JPL |
| 418504 | 2008 SA_{3} | — | September 19, 2008 | Socorro | LINEAR | · | 3.5 km | MPC · JPL |
| 418505 | 2008 SZ_{4} | — | September 7, 2008 | Catalina | CSS | · | 1.3 km | MPC · JPL |
| 418506 | 2008 SA_{6} | — | September 22, 2008 | Socorro | LINEAR | · | 4.0 km | MPC · JPL |
| 418507 | 2008 SH_{21} | — | August 21, 2008 | Kitt Peak | Spacewatch | · | 2.0 km | MPC · JPL |
| 418508 | 2008 SY_{26} | — | September 19, 2008 | Kitt Peak | Spacewatch | EOS | 1.8 km | MPC · JPL |
| 418509 | 2008 SA_{35} | — | September 20, 2008 | Kitt Peak | Spacewatch | · | 2.1 km | MPC · JPL |
| 418510 | 2008 SD_{35} | — | September 6, 2008 | Mount Lemmon | Mount Lemmon Survey | · | 2.3 km | MPC · JPL |
| 418511 | 2008 SR_{38} | — | September 20, 2008 | Kitt Peak | Spacewatch | VER | 2.9 km | MPC · JPL |
| 418512 | 2008 SN_{39} | — | September 20, 2008 | Kitt Peak | Spacewatch | EOS | 2.1 km | MPC · JPL |
| 418513 | 2008 SS_{39} | — | September 20, 2008 | Kitt Peak | Spacewatch | THM | 2.2 km | MPC · JPL |
| 418514 | 2008 ST_{40} | — | September 20, 2008 | Catalina | CSS | EOS | 1.9 km | MPC · JPL |
| 418515 | 2008 SB_{45} | — | September 6, 2008 | Mount Lemmon | Mount Lemmon Survey | THM | 2.3 km | MPC · JPL |
| 418516 | 2008 SL_{53} | — | March 9, 2005 | Mount Lemmon | Mount Lemmon Survey | TIR | 2.9 km | MPC · JPL |
| 418517 | 2008 SL_{56} | — | September 6, 2008 | Mount Lemmon | Mount Lemmon Survey | · | 2.3 km | MPC · JPL |
| 418518 | 2008 SU_{56} | — | October 5, 2002 | Apache Point | SDSS | THM | 2.1 km | MPC · JPL |
| 418519 | 2008 SX_{57} | — | September 20, 2008 | Kitt Peak | Spacewatch | VER | 3.2 km | MPC · JPL |
| 418520 | 2008 ST_{59} | — | September 20, 2008 | Kitt Peak | Spacewatch | EOS | 2.2 km | MPC · JPL |
| 418521 | 2008 SX_{59} | — | September 20, 2008 | Catalina | CSS | · | 1.7 km | MPC · JPL |
| 418522 | 2008 SA_{61} | — | September 20, 2008 | Catalina | CSS | · | 3.4 km | MPC · JPL |
| 418523 | 2008 SO_{62} | — | September 21, 2008 | Kitt Peak | Spacewatch | · | 4.2 km | MPC · JPL |
| 418524 | 2008 SS_{63} | — | September 21, 2008 | Kitt Peak | Spacewatch | · | 3.3 km | MPC · JPL |
| 418525 | 2008 SH_{64} | — | September 9, 2008 | Mount Lemmon | Mount Lemmon Survey | · | 3.4 km | MPC · JPL |
| 418526 | 2008 SY_{65} | — | September 21, 2008 | Mount Lemmon | Mount Lemmon Survey | T_{j} (2.99) | 4.0 km | MPC · JPL |
| 418527 | 2008 SW_{71} | — | September 22, 2008 | Kitt Peak | Spacewatch | · | 3.6 km | MPC · JPL |
| 418528 | 2008 SE_{72} | — | September 22, 2008 | Catalina | CSS | · | 4.0 km | MPC · JPL |
| 418529 | 2008 SK_{73} | — | September 21, 2003 | Kitt Peak | Spacewatch | · | 3.3 km | MPC · JPL |
| 418530 | 2008 SS_{78} | — | September 23, 2008 | Mount Lemmon | Mount Lemmon Survey | · | 2.5 km | MPC · JPL |
| 418531 | 2008 SB_{84} | — | November 29, 2003 | Kitt Peak | Spacewatch | · | 2.5 km | MPC · JPL |
| 418532 Saruman | 2008 SZ_{84} | Saruman | September 27, 2008 | Taunus | E. Schwab, Zimmer, U. | · | 2.4 km | MPC · JPL |
| 418533 | 2008 SC_{87} | — | September 20, 2008 | Kitt Peak | Spacewatch | · | 2.0 km | MPC · JPL |
| 418534 | 2008 SZ_{87} | — | September 20, 2008 | Catalina | CSS | · | 4.0 km | MPC · JPL |
| 418535 | 2008 SV_{88} | — | September 20, 2008 | Catalina | CSS | · | 2.1 km | MPC · JPL |
| 418536 | 2008 SW_{90} | — | September 21, 2008 | Kitt Peak | Spacewatch | · | 3.3 km | MPC · JPL |
| 418537 | 2008 SG_{92} | — | September 21, 2008 | Kitt Peak | Spacewatch | · | 2.1 km | MPC · JPL |
| 418538 | 2008 SS_{98} | — | September 21, 2008 | Kitt Peak | Spacewatch | · | 3.3 km | MPC · JPL |
| 418539 | 2008 SK_{101} | — | September 21, 2008 | Kitt Peak | Spacewatch | · | 1.8 km | MPC · JPL |
| 418540 | 2008 SR_{102} | — | September 21, 2008 | Mount Lemmon | Mount Lemmon Survey | · | 2.8 km | MPC · JPL |
| 418541 | 2008 SW_{102} | — | September 21, 2008 | Kitt Peak | Spacewatch | HYG | 2.7 km | MPC · JPL |
| 418542 | 2008 SY_{102} | — | September 21, 2008 | Kitt Peak | Spacewatch | · | 4.5 km | MPC · JPL |
| 418543 | 2008 SZ_{102} | — | September 21, 2008 | Kitt Peak | Spacewatch | · | 2.5 km | MPC · JPL |
| 418544 | 2008 SB_{104} | — | September 21, 2008 | Kitt Peak | Spacewatch | · | 3.6 km | MPC · JPL |
| 418545 | 2008 SQ_{107} | — | September 9, 2008 | Kitt Peak | Spacewatch | VER | 2.2 km | MPC · JPL |
| 418546 | 2008 SS_{107} | — | September 22, 2008 | Kitt Peak | Spacewatch | · | 3.0 km | MPC · JPL |
| 418547 | 2008 ST_{107} | — | September 22, 2008 | Kitt Peak | Spacewatch | · | 3.3 km | MPC · JPL |
| 418548 | 2008 SQ_{113} | — | September 22, 2008 | Kitt Peak | Spacewatch | · | 3.2 km | MPC · JPL |
| 418549 | 2008 SO_{115} | — | September 22, 2008 | Kitt Peak | Spacewatch | · | 5.1 km | MPC · JPL |
| 418550 | 2008 SF_{117} | — | September 22, 2008 | Mount Lemmon | Mount Lemmon Survey | EOS | 2.2 km | MPC · JPL |
| 418551 | 2008 SF_{119} | — | September 22, 2008 | Mount Lemmon | Mount Lemmon Survey | THM | 1.8 km | MPC · JPL |
| 418552 | 2008 SJ_{119} | — | September 22, 2008 | Mount Lemmon | Mount Lemmon Survey | · | 2.9 km | MPC · JPL |
| 418553 | 2008 SD_{121} | — | September 22, 2008 | Mount Lemmon | Mount Lemmon Survey | · | 3.2 km | MPC · JPL |
| 418554 | 2008 SH_{121} | — | September 22, 2008 | Mount Lemmon | Mount Lemmon Survey | HYG | 2.9 km | MPC · JPL |
| 418555 | 2008 SG_{122} | — | September 6, 2008 | Mount Lemmon | Mount Lemmon Survey | · | 2.0 km | MPC · JPL |
| 418556 | 2008 SD_{123} | — | September 22, 2008 | Mount Lemmon | Mount Lemmon Survey | THM | 2.1 km | MPC · JPL |
| 418557 | 2008 SM_{123} | — | September 22, 2008 | Mount Lemmon | Mount Lemmon Survey | THM | 2.0 km | MPC · JPL |
| 418558 | 2008 SH_{125} | — | September 22, 2008 | Mount Lemmon | Mount Lemmon Survey | · | 2.3 km | MPC · JPL |
| 418559 | 2008 SU_{130} | — | September 22, 2008 | Kitt Peak | Spacewatch | · | 2.8 km | MPC · JPL |
| 418560 | 2008 SD_{139} | — | October 5, 2002 | Apache Point | SDSS | · | 2.7 km | MPC · JPL |
| 418561 | 2008 SE_{140} | — | September 24, 2008 | Catalina | CSS | · | 3.5 km | MPC · JPL |
| 418562 | 2008 SL_{140} | — | September 24, 2008 | Mount Lemmon | Mount Lemmon Survey | EOS | 2.1 km | MPC · JPL |
| 418563 | 2008 SM_{140} | — | September 6, 2008 | Mount Lemmon | Mount Lemmon Survey | · | 2.5 km | MPC · JPL |
| 418564 | 2008 SY_{144} | — | September 25, 2008 | Kitt Peak | Spacewatch | HYG | 2.9 km | MPC · JPL |
| 418565 | 2008 SN_{150} | — | November 24, 2003 | Kitt Peak | Spacewatch | LIX | 4.0 km | MPC · JPL |
| 418566 | 2008 SM_{154} | — | September 22, 2008 | Socorro | LINEAR | · | 3.7 km | MPC · JPL |
| 418567 | 2008 ST_{154} | — | September 22, 2008 | Socorro | LINEAR | · | 4.0 km | MPC · JPL |
| 418568 | 2008 SM_{156} | — | September 23, 2008 | Socorro | LINEAR | · | 3.8 km | MPC · JPL |
| 418569 | 2008 ST_{157} | — | August 24, 2008 | Kitt Peak | Spacewatch | · | 2.9 km | MPC · JPL |
| 418570 | 2008 SD_{161} | — | September 28, 2008 | Socorro | LINEAR | · | 4.3 km | MPC · JPL |
| 418571 | 2008 SE_{169} | — | September 21, 2008 | Catalina | CSS | · | 3.2 km | MPC · JPL |
| 418572 | 2008 SP_{172} | — | September 22, 2008 | Mount Lemmon | Mount Lemmon Survey | EOS | 3.4 km | MPC · JPL |
| 418573 | 2008 SA_{173} | — | September 16, 2002 | Palomar | NEAT | · | 2.5 km | MPC · JPL |
| 418574 | 2008 SU_{177} | — | July 30, 2008 | Mount Lemmon | Mount Lemmon Survey | EOS | 2.0 km | MPC · JPL |
| 418575 | 2008 SY_{184} | — | September 24, 2008 | Kitt Peak | Spacewatch | · | 3.2 km | MPC · JPL |
| 418576 | 2008 SD_{186} | — | September 7, 2008 | Mount Lemmon | Mount Lemmon Survey | · | 1.9 km | MPC · JPL |
| 418577 | 2008 SJ_{188} | — | September 25, 2008 | Kitt Peak | Spacewatch | TIR | 2.5 km | MPC · JPL |
| 418578 | 2008 SO_{188} | — | September 25, 2008 | Kitt Peak | Spacewatch | LIX | 3.0 km | MPC · JPL |
| 418579 | 2008 SM_{196} | — | September 25, 2008 | Kitt Peak | Spacewatch | HYG | 2.1 km | MPC · JPL |
| 418580 | 2008 SB_{200} | — | September 26, 2008 | Kitt Peak | Spacewatch | · | 2.5 km | MPC · JPL |
| 418581 | 2008 SM_{200} | — | September 26, 2008 | Kitt Peak | Spacewatch | · | 2.9 km | MPC · JPL |
| 418582 | 2008 SM_{201} | — | September 26, 2008 | Kitt Peak | Spacewatch | · | 2.3 km | MPC · JPL |
| 418583 | 2008 SS_{206} | — | September 26, 2008 | Kitt Peak | Spacewatch | · | 2.3 km | MPC · JPL |
| 418584 | 2008 SM_{211} | — | September 28, 2008 | Mount Lemmon | Mount Lemmon Survey | VER | 2.9 km | MPC · JPL |
| 418585 | 2008 SJ_{217} | — | September 29, 2008 | Mount Lemmon | Mount Lemmon Survey | · | 2.6 km | MPC · JPL |
| 418586 | 2008 SP_{218} | — | September 30, 2008 | La Sagra | OAM | · | 2.4 km | MPC · JPL |
| 418587 | 2008 SL_{233} | — | September 28, 2008 | Mount Lemmon | Mount Lemmon Survey | · | 3.7 km | MPC · JPL |
| 418588 | 2008 SO_{233} | — | September 28, 2008 | Mount Lemmon | Mount Lemmon Survey | · | 2.5 km | MPC · JPL |
| 418589 | 2008 SB_{235} | — | September 19, 2008 | Kitt Peak | Spacewatch | · | 2.6 km | MPC · JPL |
| 418590 | 2008 SM_{240} | — | September 29, 2008 | Kitt Peak | Spacewatch | · | 3.1 km | MPC · JPL |
| 418591 | 2008 SS_{241} | — | September 29, 2008 | Catalina | CSS | · | 2.5 km | MPC · JPL |
| 418592 | 2008 SY_{242} | — | September 6, 2008 | Mount Lemmon | Mount Lemmon Survey | · | 2.2 km | MPC · JPL |
| 418593 | 2008 SY_{246} | — | September 30, 2008 | Catalina | CSS | · | 2.7 km | MPC · JPL |
| 418594 | 2008 SC_{248} | — | September 20, 2008 | Kitt Peak | Spacewatch | · | 2.3 km | MPC · JPL |
| 418595 | 2008 SY_{253} | — | September 22, 2008 | Kitt Peak | Spacewatch | · | 3.3 km | MPC · JPL |
| 418596 | 2008 SO_{257} | — | September 22, 2008 | Kitt Peak | Spacewatch | · | 3.1 km | MPC · JPL |
| 418597 | 2008 SX_{258} | — | October 21, 2003 | Kitt Peak | Spacewatch | EOS | 1.7 km | MPC · JPL |
| 418598 | 2008 ST_{259} | — | September 23, 2008 | Mount Lemmon | Mount Lemmon Survey | · | 2.3 km | MPC · JPL |
| 418599 | 2008 SC_{260} | — | July 25, 2003 | Palomar | NEAT | · | 2.3 km | MPC · JPL |
| 418600 | 2008 SA_{261} | — | September 23, 2008 | Kitt Peak | Spacewatch | · | 3.1 km | MPC · JPL |

== 418601–418700 ==
back to top

| Designation | | | Discovery | | | Properties | | Ref |
| Permanent | Provisional | Named after | Date | Site | Discoverer(s) | Category | Diam. | Ref |
|---|---|---|---|---|---|---|---|---|
| 418601 | 2008 SH_{262} | — | September 24, 2008 | Kitt Peak | Spacewatch | THM | 2.3 km | MPC · JPL |
| 418602 | 2008 SP_{265} | — | September 29, 2008 | Kitt Peak | Spacewatch | · | 3.4 km | MPC · JPL |
| 418603 | 2008 SM_{269} | — | September 22, 2008 | Mount Lemmon | Mount Lemmon Survey | · | 2.8 km | MPC · JPL |
| 418604 | 2008 SY_{270} | — | September 25, 2008 | Kitt Peak | Spacewatch | · | 2.9 km | MPC · JPL |
| 418605 | 2008 SM_{271} | — | September 29, 2008 | Kitt Peak | Spacewatch | THM | 2.1 km | MPC · JPL |
| 418606 | 2008 SJ_{274} | — | September 20, 2008 | Kitt Peak | Spacewatch | EOS | 2.2 km | MPC · JPL |
| 418607 | 2008 SF_{277} | — | December 19, 2003 | Kitt Peak | Spacewatch | · | 2.4 km | MPC · JPL |
| 418608 | 2008 SX_{277} | — | September 25, 2008 | Kitt Peak | Spacewatch | · | 3.1 km | MPC · JPL |
| 418609 | 2008 SZ_{279} | — | September 24, 2008 | Mount Lemmon | Mount Lemmon Survey | · | 3.9 km | MPC · JPL |
| 418610 | 2008 SV_{286} | — | September 23, 2008 | Catalina | CSS | · | 3.8 km | MPC · JPL |
| 418611 | 2008 SQ_{287} | — | March 16, 2005 | Mount Lemmon | Mount Lemmon Survey | · | 2.9 km | MPC · JPL |
| 418612 | 2008 SK_{288} | — | September 24, 2008 | Catalina | CSS | · | 3.8 km | MPC · JPL |
| 418613 | 2008 SH_{291} | — | September 21, 2008 | Catalina | CSS | · | 3.2 km | MPC · JPL |
| 418614 | 2008 SJ_{291} | — | September 22, 2008 | Catalina | CSS | TIR | 4.2 km | MPC · JPL |
| 418615 | 2008 SH_{300} | — | September 23, 2008 | Socorro | LINEAR | · | 2.5 km | MPC · JPL |
| 418616 | 2008 SL_{300} | — | September 23, 2008 | Catalina | CSS | · | 3.9 km | MPC · JPL |
| 418617 | 2008 SK_{302} | — | September 23, 2008 | Mount Lemmon | Mount Lemmon Survey | · | 2.5 km | MPC · JPL |
| 418618 | 2008 SO_{308} | — | September 30, 2008 | Catalina | CSS | · | 3.1 km | MPC · JPL |
| 418619 | 2008 TW_{5} | — | October 3, 2008 | La Sagra | OAM | THB | 2.6 km | MPC · JPL |
| 418620 | 2008 TS_{7} | — | October 3, 2008 | La Sagra | OAM | · | 2.9 km | MPC · JPL |
| 418621 | 2008 TJ_{10} | — | September 23, 2008 | Kitt Peak | Spacewatch | · | 2.4 km | MPC · JPL |
| 418622 | 2008 TO_{14} | — | October 1, 2008 | Mount Lemmon | Mount Lemmon Survey | · | 1.7 km | MPC · JPL |
| 418623 | 2008 TU_{19} | — | September 22, 2008 | Mount Lemmon | Mount Lemmon Survey | EOS | 1.6 km | MPC · JPL |
| 418624 | 2008 TZ_{31} | — | October 1, 2008 | Kitt Peak | Spacewatch | · | 4.7 km | MPC · JPL |
| 418625 | 2008 TD_{33} | — | October 1, 2008 | Kitt Peak | Spacewatch | · | 2.6 km | MPC · JPL |
| 418626 | 2008 TX_{33} | — | October 1, 2008 | Kitt Peak | Spacewatch | · | 2.6 km | MPC · JPL |
| 418627 | 2008 TD_{34} | — | September 7, 2008 | Mount Lemmon | Mount Lemmon Survey | · | 3.3 km | MPC · JPL |
| 418628 | 2008 TW_{34} | — | August 24, 2008 | Kitt Peak | Spacewatch | CYB | 4.0 km | MPC · JPL |
| 418629 | 2008 TC_{37} | — | October 1, 2008 | Mount Lemmon | Mount Lemmon Survey | · | 1.9 km | MPC · JPL |
| 418630 | 2008 TF_{37} | — | September 2, 2008 | Kitt Peak | Spacewatch | · | 2.3 km | MPC · JPL |
| 418631 | 2008 TT_{40} | — | October 1, 2008 | Mount Lemmon | Mount Lemmon Survey | · | 5.4 km | MPC · JPL |
| 418632 | 2008 TM_{42} | — | October 1, 2008 | Mount Lemmon | Mount Lemmon Survey | · | 2.7 km | MPC · JPL |
| 418633 | 2008 TB_{45} | — | October 1, 2008 | Mount Lemmon | Mount Lemmon Survey | · | 3.4 km | MPC · JPL |
| 418634 | 2008 TL_{47} | — | October 1, 2008 | Kitt Peak | Spacewatch | VER | 3.7 km | MPC · JPL |
| 418635 | 2008 TA_{48} | — | October 1, 2008 | Kitt Peak | Spacewatch | · | 2.1 km | MPC · JPL |
| 418636 | 2008 TE_{51} | — | October 2, 2008 | Kitt Peak | Spacewatch | · | 2.8 km | MPC · JPL |
| 418637 | 2008 TE_{52} | — | October 2, 2008 | Kitt Peak | Spacewatch | · | 3.8 km | MPC · JPL |
| 418638 | 2008 TL_{52} | — | September 24, 2008 | Kitt Peak | Spacewatch | · | 4.3 km | MPC · JPL |
| 418639 | 2008 TM_{53} | — | October 2, 2008 | Kitt Peak | Spacewatch | THM | 2.2 km | MPC · JPL |
| 418640 | 2008 TM_{55} | — | October 2, 2008 | Kitt Peak | Spacewatch | · | 1.6 km | MPC · JPL |
| 418641 | 2008 TD_{56} | — | September 20, 2008 | Kitt Peak | Spacewatch | THM | 1.7 km | MPC · JPL |
| 418642 | 2008 TS_{58} | — | September 24, 2008 | Kitt Peak | Spacewatch | · | 2.6 km | MPC · JPL |
| 418643 | 2008 TO_{59} | — | October 2, 2008 | Kitt Peak | Spacewatch | EMA | 4.1 km | MPC · JPL |
| 418644 | 2008 TU_{61} | — | October 2, 2008 | Kitt Peak | Spacewatch | · | 3.0 km | MPC · JPL |
| 418645 | 2008 TH_{63} | — | September 22, 2008 | Mount Lemmon | Mount Lemmon Survey | EOS | 1.6 km | MPC · JPL |
| 418646 | 2008 TT_{65} | — | October 2, 2008 | Catalina | CSS | · | 3.1 km | MPC · JPL |
| 418647 | 2008 TJ_{66} | — | October 2, 2008 | Kitt Peak | Spacewatch | · | 2.5 km | MPC · JPL |
| 418648 | 2008 TU_{72} | — | October 2, 2008 | Kitt Peak | Spacewatch | · | 3.8 km | MPC · JPL |
| 418649 | 2008 TQ_{76} | — | October 2, 2008 | Mount Lemmon | Mount Lemmon Survey | THM | 1.9 km | MPC · JPL |
| 418650 | 2008 TT_{76} | — | September 3, 2008 | Kitt Peak | Spacewatch | · | 2.4 km | MPC · JPL |
| 418651 | 2008 TQ_{83} | — | September 7, 2008 | Mount Lemmon | Mount Lemmon Survey | · | 2.8 km | MPC · JPL |
| 418652 | 2008 TZ_{83} | — | October 3, 2008 | Kitt Peak | Spacewatch | · | 2.2 km | MPC · JPL |
| 418653 | 2008 TT_{84} | — | October 3, 2008 | Kitt Peak | Spacewatch | · | 3.8 km | MPC · JPL |
| 418654 | 2008 TV_{84} | — | September 24, 2008 | Kitt Peak | Spacewatch | · | 1.6 km | MPC · JPL |
| 418655 | 2008 TK_{87} | — | September 25, 2008 | Kitt Peak | Spacewatch | HYG | 2.6 km | MPC · JPL |
| 418656 | 2008 TN_{91} | — | October 4, 2008 | La Sagra | OAM | · | 2.3 km | MPC · JPL |
| 418657 | 2008 TM_{92} | — | September 3, 2008 | Kitt Peak | Spacewatch | THM | 2.0 km | MPC · JPL |
| 418658 | 2008 TV_{93} | — | April 26, 2001 | Kitt Peak | Spacewatch | EOS | 2.1 km | MPC · JPL |
| 418659 | 2008 TJ_{101} | — | September 6, 2008 | Mount Lemmon | Mount Lemmon Survey | EOS | 2.0 km | MPC · JPL |
| 418660 | 2008 TF_{105} | — | October 6, 2008 | Kitt Peak | Spacewatch | · | 4.5 km | MPC · JPL |
| 418661 | 2008 TO_{112} | — | October 6, 2008 | Catalina | CSS | · | 2.7 km | MPC · JPL |
| 418662 | 2008 TO_{118} | — | September 2, 2008 | Kitt Peak | Spacewatch | · | 2.6 km | MPC · JPL |
| 418663 | 2008 TW_{118} | — | October 7, 2008 | Kitt Peak | Spacewatch | EOS | 1.7 km | MPC · JPL |
| 418664 | 2008 TP_{127} | — | October 8, 2008 | Mount Lemmon | Mount Lemmon Survey | · | 2.6 km | MPC · JPL |
| 418665 | 2008 TZ_{128} | — | October 8, 2008 | Mount Lemmon | Mount Lemmon Survey | · | 3.3 km | MPC · JPL |
| 418666 | 2008 TG_{130} | — | October 8, 2008 | Mount Lemmon | Mount Lemmon Survey | EOS | 1.6 km | MPC · JPL |
| 418667 | 2008 TO_{130} | — | October 8, 2008 | Mount Lemmon | Mount Lemmon Survey | · | 2.7 km | MPC · JPL |
| 418668 | 2008 TU_{130} | — | October 8, 2008 | Mount Lemmon | Mount Lemmon Survey | · | 4.0 km | MPC · JPL |
| 418669 | 2008 TK_{131} | — | October 8, 2008 | Mount Lemmon | Mount Lemmon Survey | · | 3.9 km | MPC · JPL |
| 418670 | 2008 TW_{131} | — | September 23, 2008 | Kitt Peak | Spacewatch | VER | 2.9 km | MPC · JPL |
| 418671 | 2008 TY_{131} | — | October 8, 2008 | Mount Lemmon | Mount Lemmon Survey | · | 2.4 km | MPC · JPL |
| 418672 | 2008 TS_{138} | — | September 23, 2008 | Kitt Peak | Spacewatch | · | 3.0 km | MPC · JPL |
| 418673 | 2008 TW_{147} | — | October 9, 2008 | Mount Lemmon | Mount Lemmon Survey | EOS | 1.7 km | MPC · JPL |
| 418674 | 2008 TD_{151} | — | October 9, 2008 | Mount Lemmon | Mount Lemmon Survey | · | 3.5 km | MPC · JPL |
| 418675 | 2008 TA_{164} | — | October 1, 2008 | Mount Lemmon | Mount Lemmon Survey | NAE | 3.4 km | MPC · JPL |
| 418676 | 2008 TO_{164} | — | October 1, 2008 | Kitt Peak | Spacewatch | · | 2.8 km | MPC · JPL |
| 418677 | 2008 TZ_{166} | — | October 8, 2008 | Mount Lemmon | Mount Lemmon Survey | · | 3.6 km | MPC · JPL |
| 418678 | 2008 TE_{168} | — | October 1, 2008 | Kitt Peak | Spacewatch | · | 1.8 km | MPC · JPL |
| 418679 | 2008 TC_{169} | — | October 6, 2008 | Mount Lemmon | Mount Lemmon Survey | · | 3.6 km | MPC · JPL |
| 418680 | 2008 TP_{171} | — | October 6, 2008 | Catalina | CSS | · | 5.7 km | MPC · JPL |
| 418681 | 2008 TB_{172} | — | October 9, 2008 | Mount Lemmon | Mount Lemmon Survey | THM | 2.4 km | MPC · JPL |
| 418682 | 2008 TJ_{172} | — | October 2, 2008 | Kitt Peak | Spacewatch | · | 2.6 km | MPC · JPL |
| 418683 | 2008 TC_{174} | — | October 2, 2008 | Mount Lemmon | Mount Lemmon Survey | HYG | 2.3 km | MPC · JPL |
| 418684 | 2008 TM_{175} | — | October 8, 2008 | Kitt Peak | Spacewatch | · | 2.1 km | MPC · JPL |
| 418685 | 2008 TB_{181} | — | October 3, 2008 | Mount Lemmon | Mount Lemmon Survey | · | 3.2 km | MPC · JPL |
| 418686 | 2008 TJ_{189} | — | October 10, 2008 | Mount Lemmon | Mount Lemmon Survey | · | 3.9 km | MPC · JPL |
| 418687 | 2008 UG_{2} | — | October 21, 2003 | Kitt Peak | Spacewatch | · | 2.7 km | MPC · JPL |
| 418688 | 2008 UT_{3} | — | October 22, 2008 | Bergisch Gladbach | W. Bickel | · | 2.3 km | MPC · JPL |
| 418689 Gema | 2008 UQ_{4} | Gema | October 24, 2008 | La Cañada | Lacruz, J. | · | 4.3 km | MPC · JPL |
| 418690 | 2008 UE_{6} | — | October 21, 2008 | Mount Lemmon | Mount Lemmon Survey | · | 4.4 km | MPC · JPL |
| 418691 | 2008 UR_{6} | — | October 22, 2008 | Andrushivka | Andrushivka | · | 2.2 km | MPC · JPL |
| 418692 | 2008 UW_{7} | — | October 17, 2008 | Kitt Peak | Spacewatch | · | 2.0 km | MPC · JPL |
| 418693 | 2008 UP_{9} | — | October 2, 2008 | Mount Lemmon | Mount Lemmon Survey | · | 2.8 km | MPC · JPL |
| 418694 | 2008 UP_{10} | — | September 24, 2008 | Kitt Peak | Spacewatch | · | 3.3 km | MPC · JPL |
| 418695 | 2008 UF_{12} | — | October 17, 2008 | Kitt Peak | Spacewatch | · | 1.8 km | MPC · JPL |
| 418696 | 2008 UH_{14} | — | October 18, 2008 | Kitt Peak | Spacewatch | EOS | 1.7 km | MPC · JPL |
| 418697 | 2008 UV_{16} | — | October 18, 2008 | Kitt Peak | Spacewatch | · | 2.8 km | MPC · JPL |
| 418698 | 2008 UB_{17} | — | October 18, 2008 | Kitt Peak | Spacewatch | · | 2.8 km | MPC · JPL |
| 418699 | 2008 UB_{24} | — | October 7, 2008 | Kitt Peak | Spacewatch | EOS | 1.8 km | MPC · JPL |
| 418700 | 2008 UM_{24} | — | October 20, 2008 | Kitt Peak | Spacewatch | · | 3.6 km | MPC · JPL |

== 418701–418800 ==
back to top

| Designation | | | Discovery | | | Properties | | Ref |
| Permanent | Provisional | Named after | Date | Site | Discoverer(s) | Category | Diam. | Ref |
|---|---|---|---|---|---|---|---|---|
| 418701 | 2008 US_{29} | — | October 20, 2008 | Kitt Peak | Spacewatch | THM | 2.1 km | MPC · JPL |
| 418702 | 2008 UY_{30} | — | October 20, 2008 | Kitt Peak | Spacewatch | CYB | 4.8 km | MPC · JPL |
| 418703 | 2008 UE_{31} | — | September 25, 2008 | Kitt Peak | Spacewatch | · | 2.5 km | MPC · JPL |
| 418704 | 2008 UP_{36} | — | October 20, 2008 | Kitt Peak | Spacewatch | · | 3.1 km | MPC · JPL |
| 418705 | 2008 UU_{37} | — | October 20, 2008 | Kitt Peak | Spacewatch | LIX | 3.3 km | MPC · JPL |
| 418706 | 2008 UL_{41} | — | October 20, 2008 | Kitt Peak | Spacewatch | T_{j} (2.98) | 4.9 km | MPC · JPL |
| 418707 | 2008 UH_{42} | — | October 20, 2008 | Kitt Peak | Spacewatch | · | 1.8 km | MPC · JPL |
| 418708 | 2008 UO_{42} | — | October 20, 2008 | Kitt Peak | Spacewatch | · | 3.1 km | MPC · JPL |
| 418709 | 2008 UC_{48} | — | October 2, 2008 | Kitt Peak | Spacewatch | · | 2.1 km | MPC · JPL |
| 418710 | 2008 UO_{48} | — | October 20, 2008 | Mount Lemmon | Mount Lemmon Survey | · | 2.9 km | MPC · JPL |
| 418711 | 2008 UG_{53} | — | October 20, 2008 | Kitt Peak | Spacewatch | · | 2.8 km | MPC · JPL |
| 418712 | 2008 US_{60} | — | October 21, 2008 | Kitt Peak | Spacewatch | VER | 4.6 km | MPC · JPL |
| 418713 | 2008 UK_{61} | — | October 21, 2008 | Kitt Peak | Spacewatch | · | 3.1 km | MPC · JPL |
| 418714 | 2008 UO_{66} | — | October 21, 2008 | Kitt Peak | Spacewatch | · | 4.0 km | MPC · JPL |
| 418715 | 2008 UC_{75} | — | October 21, 2008 | Kitt Peak | Spacewatch | EOS | 2.0 km | MPC · JPL |
| 418716 | 2008 UQ_{78} | — | October 21, 2008 | Lulin | LUSS | · | 2.5 km | MPC · JPL |
| 418717 | 2008 UR_{80} | — | October 22, 2008 | Kitt Peak | Spacewatch | · | 3.5 km | MPC · JPL |
| 418718 | 2008 UP_{83} | — | October 8, 2008 | Mount Lemmon | Mount Lemmon Survey | · | 2.5 km | MPC · JPL |
| 418719 | 2008 UQ_{83} | — | October 8, 2008 | Mount Lemmon | Mount Lemmon Survey | EOS | 1.7 km | MPC · JPL |
| 418720 | 2008 UT_{87} | — | October 24, 2008 | Črni Vrh | Mikuž, B. | · | 4.7 km | MPC · JPL |
| 418721 | 2008 UX_{88} | — | October 24, 2008 | Mount Lemmon | Mount Lemmon Survey | · | 2.9 km | MPC · JPL |
| 418722 | 2008 UY_{90} | — | October 7, 2008 | Kitt Peak | Spacewatch | · | 2.4 km | MPC · JPL |
| 418723 | 2008 UG_{96} | — | September 29, 2008 | Catalina | CSS | · | 2.5 km | MPC · JPL |
| 418724 | 2008 UK_{99} | — | October 30, 2008 | Magdalena Ridge | Ryan, W. H. | · | 2.7 km | MPC · JPL |
| 418725 | 2008 UO_{103} | — | September 22, 2008 | Mount Lemmon | Mount Lemmon Survey | · | 1.9 km | MPC · JPL |
| 418726 | 2008 UN_{106} | — | October 21, 2008 | Kitt Peak | Spacewatch | · | 3.5 km | MPC · JPL |
| 418727 | 2008 UD_{110} | — | October 22, 2008 | Kitt Peak | Spacewatch | · | 2.4 km | MPC · JPL |
| 418728 | 2008 UC_{111} | — | September 28, 2008 | Mount Lemmon | Mount Lemmon Survey | · | 2.9 km | MPC · JPL |
| 418729 | 2008 UX_{111} | — | October 22, 2008 | Kitt Peak | Spacewatch | EOS | 2.1 km | MPC · JPL |
| 418730 | 2008 UE_{113} | — | October 9, 2008 | Kitt Peak | Spacewatch | CYB | 2.5 km | MPC · JPL |
| 418731 | 2008 UX_{114} | — | October 22, 2008 | Kitt Peak | Spacewatch | · | 2.5 km | MPC · JPL |
| 418732 | 2008 UK_{118} | — | October 22, 2008 | Kitt Peak | Spacewatch | · | 3.5 km | MPC · JPL |
| 418733 | 2008 UX_{124} | — | October 22, 2008 | Kitt Peak | Spacewatch | · | 4.5 km | MPC · JPL |
| 418734 | 2008 UQ_{127} | — | October 22, 2008 | Kitt Peak | Spacewatch | · | 3.4 km | MPC · JPL |
| 418735 | 2008 UC_{130} | — | October 23, 2008 | Kitt Peak | Spacewatch | · | 2.2 km | MPC · JPL |
| 418736 | 2008 UU_{133} | — | October 23, 2008 | Kitt Peak | Spacewatch | EOS | 3.6 km | MPC · JPL |
| 418737 | 2008 UX_{133} | — | July 29, 2008 | Mount Lemmon | Mount Lemmon Survey | THM | 2.2 km | MPC · JPL |
| 418738 | 2008 UK_{135} | — | October 23, 2008 | Kitt Peak | Spacewatch | · | 2.9 km | MPC · JPL |
| 418739 | 2008 UH_{139} | — | October 23, 2008 | Kitt Peak | Spacewatch | · | 5.7 km | MPC · JPL |
| 418740 | 2008 UO_{144} | — | October 23, 2008 | Kitt Peak | Spacewatch | THM | 2.3 km | MPC · JPL |
| 418741 | 2008 UQ_{145} | — | October 23, 2008 | Kitt Peak | Spacewatch | THM | 1.9 km | MPC · JPL |
| 418742 | 2008 UG_{149} | — | October 23, 2008 | Kitt Peak | Spacewatch | · | 2.9 km | MPC · JPL |
| 418743 | 2008 UO_{149} | — | October 23, 2008 | Mount Lemmon | Mount Lemmon Survey | THM | 2.0 km | MPC · JPL |
| 418744 | 2008 UR_{152} | — | October 23, 2008 | Mount Lemmon | Mount Lemmon Survey | · | 3.1 km | MPC · JPL |
| 418745 | 2008 UQ_{155} | — | October 23, 2008 | Mount Lemmon | Mount Lemmon Survey | · | 2.9 km | MPC · JPL |
| 418746 | 2008 UC_{157} | — | October 23, 2008 | Mount Lemmon | Mount Lemmon Survey | · | 4.3 km | MPC · JPL |
| 418747 | 2008 UP_{157} | — | October 23, 2008 | Mount Lemmon | Mount Lemmon Survey | · | 2.7 km | MPC · JPL |
| 418748 | 2008 UM_{158} | — | October 23, 2008 | Kitt Peak | Spacewatch | ELF | 3.8 km | MPC · JPL |
| 418749 | 2008 UF_{162} | — | September 26, 2008 | Kitt Peak | Spacewatch | · | 3.1 km | MPC · JPL |
| 418750 | 2008 UB_{165} | — | October 8, 2008 | Kitt Peak | Spacewatch | · | 2.6 km | MPC · JPL |
| 418751 | 2008 UR_{168} | — | October 24, 2008 | Kitt Peak | Spacewatch | · | 3.0 km | MPC · JPL |
| 418752 | 2008 UQ_{169} | — | October 24, 2008 | Kitt Peak | Spacewatch | · | 3.8 km | MPC · JPL |
| 418753 | 2008 UP_{177} | — | October 24, 2008 | Mount Lemmon | Mount Lemmon Survey | · | 2.5 km | MPC · JPL |
| 418754 | 2008 UA_{188} | — | October 24, 2008 | Kitt Peak | Spacewatch | · | 2.8 km | MPC · JPL |
| 418755 | 2008 UK_{189} | — | October 25, 2008 | Mount Lemmon | Mount Lemmon Survey | · | 4.0 km | MPC · JPL |
| 418756 | 2008 UC_{197} | — | October 27, 2008 | Catalina | CSS | · | 4.5 km | MPC · JPL |
| 418757 | 2008 UJ_{199} | — | October 30, 2008 | Mount Lemmon | Mount Lemmon Survey | T_{j} (2.94) | 3.8 km | MPC · JPL |
| 418758 | 2008 UT_{204} | — | September 27, 2008 | Mount Lemmon | Mount Lemmon Survey | · | 2.5 km | MPC · JPL |
| 418759 | 2008 UZ_{204} | — | October 20, 2008 | Kitt Peak | Spacewatch | · | 3.2 km | MPC · JPL |
| 418760 | 2008 UU_{208} | — | October 23, 2008 | Kitt Peak | Spacewatch | · | 2.6 km | MPC · JPL |
| 418761 | 2008 UO_{209} | — | October 23, 2008 | Kitt Peak | Spacewatch | · | 3.1 km | MPC · JPL |
| 418762 | 2008 UF_{211} | — | October 23, 2008 | Kitt Peak | Spacewatch | · | 3.5 km | MPC · JPL |
| 418763 | 2008 UD_{224} | — | October 25, 2008 | Kitt Peak | Spacewatch | · | 3.0 km | MPC · JPL |
| 418764 | 2008 UA_{227} | — | October 25, 2008 | Kitt Peak | Spacewatch | · | 3.4 km | MPC · JPL |
| 418765 | 2008 UY_{227} | — | October 25, 2008 | Kitt Peak | Spacewatch | · | 5.1 km | MPC · JPL |
| 418766 | 2008 UU_{239} | — | October 26, 2008 | Kitt Peak | Spacewatch | · | 3.7 km | MPC · JPL |
| 418767 | 2008 UP_{242} | — | October 26, 2008 | Kitt Peak | Spacewatch | TIR | 2.3 km | MPC · JPL |
| 418768 | 2008 UX_{242} | — | October 22, 2008 | Kitt Peak | Spacewatch | · | 2.9 km | MPC · JPL |
| 418769 | 2008 UB_{254} | — | October 27, 2008 | Kitt Peak | Spacewatch | · | 4.0 km | MPC · JPL |
| 418770 | 2008 UW_{262} | — | October 27, 2008 | Kitt Peak | Spacewatch | · | 3.2 km | MPC · JPL |
| 418771 | 2008 UZ_{262} | — | October 27, 2008 | Kitt Peak | Spacewatch | · | 6.5 km | MPC · JPL |
| 418772 | 2008 UW_{263} | — | October 28, 2008 | Kitt Peak | Spacewatch | · | 3.1 km | MPC · JPL |
| 418773 | 2008 UQ_{264} | — | October 9, 2008 | Kitt Peak | Spacewatch | EOS | 2.5 km | MPC · JPL |
| 418774 | 2008 UA_{265} | — | September 28, 2008 | Mount Lemmon | Mount Lemmon Survey | · | 4.1 km | MPC · JPL |
| 418775 | 2008 UO_{267} | — | October 28, 2008 | Kitt Peak | Spacewatch | · | 2.5 km | MPC · JPL |
| 418776 | 2008 UZ_{267} | — | September 25, 2008 | Kitt Peak | Spacewatch | · | 3.1 km | MPC · JPL |
| 418777 | 2008 UX_{272} | — | October 28, 2008 | Kitt Peak | Spacewatch | · | 3.0 km | MPC · JPL |
| 418778 | 2008 UJ_{276} | — | October 28, 2008 | Mount Lemmon | Mount Lemmon Survey | · | 3.2 km | MPC · JPL |
| 418779 | 2008 UV_{276} | — | October 7, 2008 | Kitt Peak | Spacewatch | · | 3.8 km | MPC · JPL |
| 418780 | 2008 UU_{280} | — | September 27, 2008 | Mount Lemmon | Mount Lemmon Survey | · | 3.1 km | MPC · JPL |
| 418781 | 2008 UP_{290} | — | October 28, 2008 | Kitt Peak | Spacewatch | EOS | 2.1 km | MPC · JPL |
| 418782 | 2008 UG_{298} | — | October 21, 2008 | Kitt Peak | Spacewatch | · | 3.2 km | MPC · JPL |
| 418783 | 2008 UU_{302} | — | October 29, 2008 | Kitt Peak | Spacewatch | · | 3.6 km | MPC · JPL |
| 418784 | 2008 UB_{314} | — | October 30, 2008 | Mount Lemmon | Mount Lemmon Survey | HYG | 2.5 km | MPC · JPL |
| 418785 | 2008 US_{322} | — | October 31, 2008 | Mount Lemmon | Mount Lemmon Survey | · | 2.7 km | MPC · JPL |
| 418786 | 2008 UU_{322} | — | September 28, 2008 | Mount Lemmon | Mount Lemmon Survey | · | 2.3 km | MPC · JPL |
| 418787 | 2008 UH_{323} | — | October 31, 2008 | Catalina | CSS | · | 2.9 km | MPC · JPL |
| 418788 | 2008 UF_{330} | — | October 2, 2008 | Kitt Peak | Spacewatch | EOS | 1.8 km | MPC · JPL |
| 418789 | 2008 UR_{337} | — | October 20, 2008 | Kitt Peak | Spacewatch | · | 3.3 km | MPC · JPL |
| 418790 | 2008 UJ_{346} | — | October 31, 2008 | Mount Lemmon | Mount Lemmon Survey | · | 3.5 km | MPC · JPL |
| 418791 | 2008 UR_{347} | — | October 23, 2008 | Kitt Peak | Spacewatch | · | 2.5 km | MPC · JPL |
| 418792 | 2008 UX_{357} | — | October 25, 2008 | Catalina | CSS | · | 3.5 km | MPC · JPL |
| 418793 | 2008 UD_{358} | — | October 25, 2008 | Kitt Peak | Spacewatch | · | 3.3 km | MPC · JPL |
| 418794 | 2008 UP_{364} | — | October 28, 2008 | Catalina | CSS | · | 5.5 km | MPC · JPL |
| 418795 | 2008 UM_{366} | — | October 20, 2008 | Mount Lemmon | Mount Lemmon Survey | THM | 2.1 km | MPC · JPL |
| 418796 | 2008 UN_{366} | — | October 20, 2008 | Mount Lemmon | Mount Lemmon Survey | · | 2.5 km | MPC · JPL |
| 418797 | 2008 VF | — | November 1, 2008 | Socorro | LINEAR | ATE | 790 m | MPC · JPL |
| 418798 | 2008 VY | — | October 29, 2008 | Mount Lemmon | Mount Lemmon Survey | EOS | 2.1 km | MPC · JPL |
| 418799 | 2008 VN_{10} | — | November 2, 2008 | Mount Lemmon | Mount Lemmon Survey | · | 3.0 km | MPC · JPL |
| 418800 | 2008 VT_{14} | — | November 9, 2008 | La Sagra | OAM | · | 2.8 km | MPC · JPL |

== 418801–418900 ==
back to top

| Designation | | | Discovery | | | Properties | | Ref |
| Permanent | Provisional | Named after | Date | Site | Discoverer(s) | Category | Diam. | Ref |
|---|---|---|---|---|---|---|---|---|
| 418801 | 2008 VO_{15} | — | November 1, 2008 | Kitt Peak | Spacewatch | THM | 2.0 km | MPC · JPL |
| 418802 | 2008 VN_{16} | — | November 1, 2008 | Kitt Peak | Spacewatch | · | 2.4 km | MPC · JPL |
| 418803 | 2008 VG_{18} | — | November 1, 2008 | Kitt Peak | Spacewatch | T_{j} (2.99) | 4.3 km | MPC · JPL |
| 418804 | 2008 VU_{20} | — | November 1, 2008 | Mount Lemmon | Mount Lemmon Survey | · | 3.1 km | MPC · JPL |
| 418805 | 2008 VT_{22} | — | September 23, 2008 | Mount Lemmon | Mount Lemmon Survey | · | 3.7 km | MPC · JPL |
| 418806 | 2008 VO_{25} | — | November 2, 2008 | Kitt Peak | Spacewatch | · | 3.9 km | MPC · JPL |
| 418807 | 2008 VL_{26} | — | November 2, 2008 | Kitt Peak | Spacewatch | · | 4.2 km | MPC · JPL |
| 418808 | 2008 VB_{29} | — | November 2, 2008 | Kitt Peak | Spacewatch | · | 3.3 km | MPC · JPL |
| 418809 | 2008 VO_{30} | — | November 2, 2008 | Kitt Peak | Spacewatch | · | 3.2 km | MPC · JPL |
| 418810 | 2008 VJ_{32} | — | October 7, 2008 | Mount Lemmon | Mount Lemmon Survey | · | 2.9 km | MPC · JPL |
| 418811 | 2008 VQ_{36} | — | November 29, 2003 | Kitt Peak | Spacewatch | EOS | 1.6 km | MPC · JPL |
| 418812 | 2008 VF_{39} | — | November 2, 2008 | Catalina | CSS | slow | 3.1 km | MPC · JPL |
| 418813 | 2008 VP_{39} | — | November 2, 2008 | Kitt Peak | Spacewatch | · | 3.1 km | MPC · JPL |
| 418814 | 2008 VC_{41} | — | October 22, 2008 | Kitt Peak | Spacewatch | · | 4.3 km | MPC · JPL |
| 418815 | 2008 VQ_{45} | — | November 3, 2008 | Kitt Peak | Spacewatch | EOS | 2.0 km | MPC · JPL |
| 418816 | 2008 VY_{46} | — | October 20, 2008 | Kitt Peak | Spacewatch | THM | 1.9 km | MPC · JPL |
| 418817 | 2008 VE_{56} | — | March 7, 2005 | Socorro | LINEAR | EOS | 2.6 km | MPC · JPL |
| 418818 | 2008 VP_{57} | — | November 6, 2008 | Mount Lemmon | Mount Lemmon Survey | · | 2.9 km | MPC · JPL |
| 418819 | 2008 VQ_{61} | — | November 8, 2008 | Mount Lemmon | Mount Lemmon Survey | · | 3.5 km | MPC · JPL |
| 418820 | 2008 VF_{66} | — | November 1, 2008 | Kitt Peak | Spacewatch | CYB | 3.8 km | MPC · JPL |
| 418821 | 2008 VH_{67} | — | November 7, 2008 | Catalina | CSS | · | 2.9 km | MPC · JPL |
| 418822 | 2008 VO_{71} | — | November 7, 2008 | Mount Lemmon | Mount Lemmon Survey | · | 3.7 km | MPC · JPL |
| 418823 | 2008 VX_{76} | — | November 2, 2008 | Mount Lemmon | Mount Lemmon Survey | · | 2.8 km | MPC · JPL |
| 418824 | 2008 VY_{78} | — | November 8, 2008 | Mount Lemmon | Mount Lemmon Survey | · | 6.3 km | MPC · JPL |
| 418825 | 2008 VQ_{79} | — | July 21, 2002 | Palomar | NEAT | · | 4.5 km | MPC · JPL |
| 418826 | 2008 VB_{80} | — | November 8, 2008 | Kitt Peak | Spacewatch | · | 3.5 km | MPC · JPL |
| 418827 | 2008 VQ_{80} | — | December 28, 2003 | Socorro | LINEAR | · | 3.3 km | MPC · JPL |
| 418828 | 2008 WN_{3} | — | October 29, 2008 | Kitt Peak | Spacewatch | · | 2.9 km | MPC · JPL |
| 418829 | 2008 WB_{4} | — | March 9, 2005 | Catalina | CSS | · | 3.7 km | MPC · JPL |
| 418830 | 2008 WJ_{5} | — | November 17, 2008 | Kitt Peak | Spacewatch | · | 3.2 km | MPC · JPL |
| 418831 | 2008 WA_{6} | — | November 17, 2008 | Kitt Peak | Spacewatch | · | 2.9 km | MPC · JPL |
| 418832 | 2008 WM_{8} | — | November 17, 2008 | Kitt Peak | Spacewatch | · | 2.6 km | MPC · JPL |
| 418833 | 2008 WJ_{18} | — | September 23, 2008 | Mount Lemmon | Mount Lemmon Survey | · | 2.5 km | MPC · JPL |
| 418834 | 2008 WH_{22} | — | September 23, 2008 | Kitt Peak | Spacewatch | · | 2.6 km | MPC · JPL |
| 418835 | 2008 WH_{23} | — | November 18, 2008 | Catalina | CSS | · | 3.7 km | MPC · JPL |
| 418836 | 2008 WL_{28} | — | October 27, 2008 | Mount Lemmon | Mount Lemmon Survey | VER | 2.9 km | MPC · JPL |
| 418837 | 2008 WW_{29} | — | November 19, 2008 | Mount Lemmon | Mount Lemmon Survey | · | 3.4 km | MPC · JPL |
| 418838 | 2008 WD_{33} | — | November 17, 2008 | Farra d'Isonzo | Farra d'Isonzo | · | 2.9 km | MPC · JPL |
| 418839 | 2008 WM_{33} | — | November 17, 2008 | Kitt Peak | Spacewatch | · | 3.1 km | MPC · JPL |
| 418840 | 2008 WX_{33} | — | September 29, 2008 | Mount Lemmon | Mount Lemmon Survey | · | 3.2 km | MPC · JPL |
| 418841 | 2008 WZ_{34} | — | November 17, 2008 | Kitt Peak | Spacewatch | · | 2.7 km | MPC · JPL |
| 418842 | 2008 WT_{48} | — | November 18, 2008 | Catalina | CSS | · | 3.1 km | MPC · JPL |
| 418843 | 2008 WW_{51} | — | October 9, 2008 | Kitt Peak | Spacewatch | · | 2.7 km | MPC · JPL |
| 418844 | 2008 WZ_{55} | — | October 20, 2008 | Kitt Peak | Spacewatch | · | 2.5 km | MPC · JPL |
| 418845 | 2008 WM_{59} | — | November 18, 2008 | Socorro | LINEAR | · | 3.5 km | MPC · JPL |
| 418846 | 2008 WJ_{60} | — | November 23, 2008 | Mount Lemmon | Mount Lemmon Survey | AMO | 190 m | MPC · JPL |
| 418847 | 2008 WR_{60} | — | October 20, 2008 | Kitt Peak | Spacewatch | · | 2.4 km | MPC · JPL |
| 418848 | 2008 WL_{62} | — | November 17, 2008 | Kitt Peak | Spacewatch | T_{j} (2.99) | 3.8 km | MPC · JPL |
| 418849 | 2008 WM_{64} | — | November 24, 2008 | Mount Lemmon | Mount Lemmon Survey | APO · PHA | 290 m | MPC · JPL |
| 418850 | 2008 WQ_{66} | — | November 18, 2008 | Kitt Peak | Spacewatch | · | 2.5 km | MPC · JPL |
| 418851 | 2008 WE_{75} | — | November 20, 2008 | Kitt Peak | Spacewatch | EOS | 1.9 km | MPC · JPL |
| 418852 | 2008 WH_{78} | — | November 20, 2008 | Kitt Peak | Spacewatch | HYG | 2.5 km | MPC · JPL |
| 418853 | 2008 WJ_{87} | — | October 6, 2008 | Mount Lemmon | Mount Lemmon Survey | · | 3.8 km | MPC · JPL |
| 418854 | 2008 WO_{88} | — | November 21, 2008 | Kitt Peak | Spacewatch | · | 4.4 km | MPC · JPL |
| 418855 | 2008 WM_{92} | — | October 20, 2008 | Kitt Peak | Spacewatch | EOS | 2.3 km | MPC · JPL |
| 418856 | 2008 WT_{92} | — | September 29, 2008 | Catalina | CSS | · | 4.6 km | MPC · JPL |
| 418857 | 2008 WD_{98} | — | November 19, 2008 | Kitt Peak | Spacewatch | · | 2.9 km | MPC · JPL |
| 418858 | 2008 WA_{102} | — | November 30, 2008 | Socorro | LINEAR | · | 4.0 km | MPC · JPL |
| 418859 | 2008 WL_{102} | — | November 19, 2008 | Catalina | CSS | · | 4.7 km | MPC · JPL |
| 418860 | 2008 WF_{105} | — | November 30, 2008 | Mount Lemmon | Mount Lemmon Survey | · | 3.2 km | MPC · JPL |
| 418861 | 2008 WG_{105} | — | November 30, 2008 | Mount Lemmon | Mount Lemmon Survey | · | 2.9 km | MPC · JPL |
| 418862 | 2008 WM_{109} | — | November 4, 2008 | Kitt Peak | Spacewatch | · | 2.5 km | MPC · JPL |
| 418863 | 2008 WA_{110} | — | November 30, 2008 | Kitt Peak | Spacewatch | · | 2.9 km | MPC · JPL |
| 418864 | 2008 WS_{133} | — | February 11, 2004 | Palomar | NEAT | · | 3.1 km | MPC · JPL |
| 418865 | 2008 WR_{134} | — | November 24, 2008 | Mount Lemmon | Mount Lemmon Survey | · | 3.0 km | MPC · JPL |
| 418866 | 2008 WR_{135} | — | November 19, 2008 | Kitt Peak | Spacewatch | · | 3.9 km | MPC · JPL |
| 418867 | 2008 WJ_{137} | — | November 22, 2008 | Socorro | LINEAR | · | 3.5 km | MPC · JPL |
| 418868 | 2008 WA_{139} | — | November 30, 2008 | Socorro | LINEAR | · | 4.6 km | MPC · JPL |
| 418869 | 2008 WN_{139} | — | November 30, 2008 | Socorro | LINEAR | THB | 4.1 km | MPC · JPL |
| 418870 | 2008 XV_{4} | — | December 3, 2008 | Socorro | LINEAR | H | 780 m | MPC · JPL |
| 418871 | 2008 XB_{5} | — | December 4, 2008 | Socorro | LINEAR | · | 3.7 km | MPC · JPL |
| 418872 | 2008 XS_{7} | — | December 1, 2008 | Kitt Peak | Spacewatch | · | 2.9 km | MPC · JPL |
| 418873 | 2008 XL_{11} | — | March 11, 2005 | Kitt Peak | Spacewatch | · | 4.1 km | MPC · JPL |
| 418874 | 2008 XR_{25} | — | October 27, 2008 | Kitt Peak | Spacewatch | · | 3.5 km | MPC · JPL |
| 418875 | 2008 XM_{44} | — | October 8, 2002 | Kitt Peak | Spacewatch | · | 2.6 km | MPC · JPL |
| 418876 | 2008 XR_{52} | — | December 2, 2008 | Mount Lemmon | Mount Lemmon Survey | · | 3.9 km | MPC · JPL |
| 418877 | 2008 YK_{21} | — | December 21, 2008 | Mount Lemmon | Mount Lemmon Survey | · | 600 m | MPC · JPL |
| 418878 | 2008 YB_{22} | — | December 21, 2008 | Mount Lemmon | Mount Lemmon Survey | · | 2.6 km | MPC · JPL |
| 418879 | 2008 YN_{28} | — | December 28, 2008 | Piszkéstető | K. Sárneczky | · | 4.4 km | MPC · JPL |
| 418880 | 2008 YT_{33} | — | December 28, 2008 | Dauban | Kugel, F. | · | 3.4 km | MPC · JPL |
| 418881 | 2008 YN_{65} | — | December 1, 2008 | Mount Lemmon | Mount Lemmon Survey | TIR | 3.5 km | MPC · JPL |
| 418882 | 2008 YD_{74} | — | December 5, 2008 | Mount Lemmon | Mount Lemmon Survey | · | 3.9 km | MPC · JPL |
| 418883 | 2008 YH_{88} | — | November 30, 2008 | Mount Lemmon | Mount Lemmon Survey | · | 3.1 km | MPC · JPL |
| 418884 | 2008 YW_{99} | — | December 29, 2008 | Kitt Peak | Spacewatch | · | 660 m | MPC · JPL |
| 418885 | 2008 YQ_{104} | — | December 29, 2008 | Kitt Peak | Spacewatch | · | 3.4 km | MPC · JPL |
| 418886 | 2008 YV_{104} | — | December 21, 2008 | Kitt Peak | Spacewatch | · | 2.9 km | MPC · JPL |
| 418887 | 2008 YF_{115} | — | December 29, 2008 | Kitt Peak | Spacewatch | · | 5.1 km | MPC · JPL |
| 418888 | 2008 YB_{126} | — | December 30, 2008 | Kitt Peak | Spacewatch | · | 820 m | MPC · JPL |
| 418889 | 2008 YP_{135} | — | December 6, 2002 | Socorro | LINEAR | TIR | 3.1 km | MPC · JPL |
| 418890 | 2008 YE_{148} | — | December 31, 2008 | Kitt Peak | Spacewatch | · | 730 m | MPC · JPL |
| 418891 Vizi | 2008 YK_{148} | Vizi | December 31, 2008 | Piszkéstető | K. Sárneczky | · | 4.1 km | MPC · JPL |
| 418892 | 2008 YC_{167} | — | December 21, 2008 | Kitt Peak | Spacewatch | · | 6.1 km | MPC · JPL |
| 418893 | 2008 YQ_{170} | — | December 30, 2008 | Catalina | CSS | · | 5.3 km | MPC · JPL |
| 418894 | 2008 YT_{171} | — | December 22, 2008 | Kitt Peak | Spacewatch | · | 2.5 km | MPC · JPL |
| 418895 | 2009 AM_{1} | — | October 24, 2008 | Mount Lemmon | Mount Lemmon Survey | EOS | 2.4 km | MPC · JPL |
| 418896 | 2009 AK_{15} | — | January 6, 2009 | Siding Spring | SSS | APO | 450 m | MPC · JPL |
| 418897 | 2009 AC_{25} | — | January 3, 2009 | Kitt Peak | Spacewatch | · | 4.2 km | MPC · JPL |
| 418898 | 2009 AT_{37} | — | December 21, 2008 | Mount Lemmon | Mount Lemmon Survey | · | 4.0 km | MPC · JPL |
| 418899 | 2009 AY_{49} | — | January 15, 2009 | Kitt Peak | Spacewatch | · | 4.4 km | MPC · JPL |
| 418900 | 2009 BE_{2} | — | January 16, 2009 | Kitt Peak | Spacewatch | AMO · APO | 510 m | MPC · JPL |

== 418901–419000 ==
back to top

| Designation | | | Discovery | | | Properties | | Ref |
| Permanent | Provisional | Named after | Date | Site | Discoverer(s) | Category | Diam. | Ref |
|---|---|---|---|---|---|---|---|---|
| 418901 | 2009 BX_{22} | — | January 17, 2009 | Kitt Peak | Spacewatch | · | 4.5 km | MPC · JPL |
| 418902 | 2009 BE_{47} | — | January 16, 2009 | Kitt Peak | Spacewatch | · | 680 m | MPC · JPL |
| 418903 | 2009 BB_{48} | — | January 16, 2009 | Mount Lemmon | Mount Lemmon Survey | · | 850 m | MPC · JPL |
| 418904 | 2009 BZ_{69} | — | January 25, 2009 | Catalina | CSS | · | 960 m | MPC · JPL |
| 418905 | 2009 BX_{72} | — | January 29, 2009 | Dauban | Kugel, F. | · | 690 m | MPC · JPL |
| 418906 | 2009 BA_{76} | — | January 25, 2009 | Catalina | CSS | · | 820 m | MPC · JPL |
| 418907 | 2009 BY_{79} | — | January 31, 2009 | Socorro | LINEAR | · | 3.8 km | MPC · JPL |
| 418908 | 2009 BX_{92} | — | January 25, 2009 | Kitt Peak | Spacewatch | · | 760 m | MPC · JPL |
| 418909 | 2009 BS_{148} | — | January 31, 2009 | Kitt Peak | Spacewatch | · | 650 m | MPC · JPL |
| 418910 | 2009 BO_{158} | — | January 31, 2009 | Kitt Peak | Spacewatch | · | 540 m | MPC · JPL |
| 418911 | 2009 BZ_{164} | — | January 31, 2009 | Kitt Peak | Spacewatch | · | 650 m | MPC · JPL |
| 418912 | 2009 BR_{172} | — | January 18, 2009 | Mount Lemmon | Mount Lemmon Survey | · | 690 m | MPC · JPL |
| 418913 | 2009 BU_{177} | — | January 31, 2009 | Mount Lemmon | Mount Lemmon Survey | V | 580 m | MPC · JPL |
| 418914 | 2009 BW_{177} | — | January 31, 2009 | Kitt Peak | Spacewatch | · | 630 m | MPC · JPL |
| 418915 | 2009 BN_{181} | — | January 19, 2009 | Mount Lemmon | Mount Lemmon Survey | · | 910 m | MPC · JPL |
| 418916 | 2009 BX_{182} | — | January 20, 2009 | Kitt Peak | Spacewatch | · | 640 m | MPC · JPL |
| 418917 | 2009 BH_{188} | — | January 29, 2009 | Mount Lemmon | Mount Lemmon Survey | · | 900 m | MPC · JPL |
| 418918 | 2009 CT_{26} | — | February 1, 2009 | Kitt Peak | Spacewatch | · | 670 m | MPC · JPL |
| 418919 | 2009 CN_{27} | — | February 1, 2009 | Kitt Peak | Spacewatch | · | 860 m | MPC · JPL |
| 418920 | 2009 CZ_{31} | — | February 1, 2009 | Kitt Peak | Spacewatch | · | 750 m | MPC · JPL |
| 418921 | 2009 CV_{32} | — | February 1, 2009 | Kitt Peak | Spacewatch | · | 800 m | MPC · JPL |
| 418922 | 2009 CL_{36} | — | February 3, 2009 | Kitt Peak | Spacewatch | · | 780 m | MPC · JPL |
| 418923 | 2009 CH_{39} | — | February 13, 2009 | Kitt Peak | Spacewatch | · | 590 m | MPC · JPL |
| 418924 | 2009 CO_{39} | — | February 14, 2009 | Calar Alto | F. Hormuth | · | 4.5 km | MPC · JPL |
| 418925 | 2009 CZ_{45} | — | February 14, 2009 | Kitt Peak | Spacewatch | · | 570 m | MPC · JPL |
| 418926 | 2009 CG_{51} | — | February 14, 2009 | La Sagra | OAM | · | 730 m | MPC · JPL |
| 418927 | 2009 CQ_{62} | — | March 25, 2006 | Kitt Peak | Spacewatch | · | 640 m | MPC · JPL |
| 418928 | 2009 DJ_{1} | — | February 18, 2009 | Wildberg | R. Apitzsch | · | 1.1 km | MPC · JPL |
| 418929 | 2009 DM_{1} | — | February 19, 2009 | Catalina | CSS | T_{j} (2.9) · AMO +1km | 1.4 km | MPC · JPL |
| 418930 | 2009 DG_{2} | — | February 16, 2009 | Dauban | Kugel, F. | · | 4.8 km | MPC · JPL |
| 418931 | 2009 DM_{6} | — | January 25, 2009 | Kitt Peak | Spacewatch | (2076) | 640 m | MPC · JPL |
| 418932 | 2009 DL_{11} | — | February 19, 2009 | Dauban | Kugel, F. | · | 620 m | MPC · JPL |
| 418933 | 2009 DV_{20} | — | February 19, 2009 | Kitt Peak | Spacewatch | T_{j} (2.99) | 4.4 km | MPC · JPL |
| 418934 | 2009 DL_{21} | — | February 19, 2009 | Kitt Peak | Spacewatch | · | 680 m | MPC · JPL |
| 418935 | 2009 DJ_{59} | — | February 22, 2009 | Kitt Peak | Spacewatch | PHO | 1.3 km | MPC · JPL |
| 418936 | 2009 DU_{59} | — | February 22, 2009 | Kitt Peak | Spacewatch | V | 690 m | MPC · JPL |
| 418937 | 2009 DT_{72} | — | February 3, 2009 | Kitt Peak | Spacewatch | · | 580 m | MPC · JPL |
| 418938 | 2009 DB_{74} | — | February 26, 2009 | Catalina | CSS | · | 780 m | MPC · JPL |
| 418939 | 2009 DH_{78} | — | February 21, 2009 | Kitt Peak | Spacewatch | · | 540 m | MPC · JPL |
| 418940 | 2009 DA_{89} | — | February 24, 2009 | Mount Lemmon | Mount Lemmon Survey | · | 630 m | MPC · JPL |
| 418941 | 2009 DJ_{92} | — | February 28, 2009 | Kitt Peak | Spacewatch | · | 820 m | MPC · JPL |
| 418942 | 2009 DC_{95} | — | March 14, 2002 | Kitt Peak | Spacewatch | · | 1.0 km | MPC · JPL |
| 418943 | 2009 DQ_{102} | — | October 18, 2003 | Palomar | NEAT | · | 1.2 km | MPC · JPL |
| 418944 | 2009 DB_{106} | — | February 26, 2009 | Kitt Peak | Spacewatch | V | 520 m | MPC · JPL |
| 418945 | 2009 DA_{129} | — | February 24, 2009 | Mount Lemmon | Mount Lemmon Survey | · | 800 m | MPC · JPL |
| 418946 | 2009 DV_{135} | — | August 4, 2003 | Kitt Peak | Spacewatch | V | 680 m | MPC · JPL |
| 418947 | 2009 ED_{3} | — | March 15, 2009 | Catalina | CSS | · | 770 m | MPC · JPL |
| 418948 | 2009 EU_{20} | — | March 15, 2009 | Kitt Peak | Spacewatch | NYS | 810 m | MPC · JPL |
| 418949 | 2009 EM_{22} | — | October 21, 2007 | Mount Lemmon | Mount Lemmon Survey | · | 810 m | MPC · JPL |
| 418950 | 2009 EK_{24} | — | March 1, 2009 | Mount Lemmon | Mount Lemmon Survey | · | 1.3 km | MPC · JPL |
| 418951 | 2009 ER_{30} | — | March 1, 2009 | Kitt Peak | Spacewatch | 3:2 · SHU | 5.7 km | MPC · JPL |
| 418952 | 2009 FW_{6} | — | March 16, 2009 | Kitt Peak | Spacewatch | NYS | 1.2 km | MPC · JPL |
| 418953 | 2009 FN_{24} | — | March 20, 2009 | La Sagra | OAM | · | 780 m | MPC · JPL |
| 418954 | 2009 FN_{31} | — | March 19, 2009 | Kitt Peak | Spacewatch | · | 740 m | MPC · JPL |
| 418955 | 2009 FW_{51} | — | March 28, 2009 | Mount Lemmon | Mount Lemmon Survey | · | 1.3 km | MPC · JPL |
| 418956 | 2009 FY_{62} | — | March 26, 2009 | Kitt Peak | Spacewatch | · | 1.2 km | MPC · JPL |
| 418957 | 2009 FR_{70} | — | March 21, 2009 | Catalina | CSS | · | 1.1 km | MPC · JPL |
| 418958 | 2009 FZ_{70} | — | March 27, 2009 | Mount Lemmon | Mount Lemmon Survey | NYS | 1.0 km | MPC · JPL |
| 418959 | 2009 FW_{74} | — | March 24, 2009 | Mount Lemmon | Mount Lemmon Survey | · | 970 m | MPC · JPL |
| 418960 | 2009 FG_{76} | — | March 26, 2009 | Mount Lemmon | Mount Lemmon Survey | · | 1.5 km | MPC · JPL |
| 418961 | 2009 GH | — | January 20, 2009 | Mount Lemmon | Mount Lemmon Survey | · | 900 m | MPC · JPL |
| 418962 | 2009 GC_{6} | — | April 2, 2009 | Kitt Peak | Spacewatch | · | 580 m | MPC · JPL |
| 418963 | 2009 HC_{4} | — | April 17, 2009 | Kitt Peak | Spacewatch | 3:2 | 5.6 km | MPC · JPL |
| 418964 | 2009 HL_{13} | — | April 17, 2009 | Catalina | CSS | · | 850 m | MPC · JPL |
| 418965 | 2009 HP_{14} | — | May 30, 2006 | Mount Lemmon | Mount Lemmon Survey | V | 810 m | MPC · JPL |
| 418966 | 2009 HO_{21} | — | April 16, 2009 | Catalina | CSS | · | 810 m | MPC · JPL |
| 418967 | 2009 HE_{29} | — | April 19, 2009 | Kitt Peak | Spacewatch | · | 1.5 km | MPC · JPL |
| 418968 | 2009 HX_{34} | — | April 20, 2009 | Mount Lemmon | Mount Lemmon Survey | · | 820 m | MPC · JPL |
| 418969 | 2009 HX_{50} | — | April 21, 2009 | Kitt Peak | Spacewatch | V | 680 m | MPC · JPL |
| 418970 | 2009 HA_{56} | — | March 17, 2009 | Kitt Peak | Spacewatch | PHO | 690 m | MPC · JPL |
| 418971 | 2009 HQ_{62} | — | April 17, 2009 | Kitt Peak | Spacewatch | · | 540 m | MPC · JPL |
| 418972 | 2009 HV_{68} | — | April 21, 2009 | Mount Lemmon | Mount Lemmon Survey | MAS | 760 m | MPC · JPL |
| 418973 | 2009 HW_{74} | — | April 1, 2009 | Kitt Peak | Spacewatch | · | 1.4 km | MPC · JPL |
| 418974 | 2009 HE_{90} | — | April 19, 2009 | Mount Lemmon | Mount Lemmon Survey | · | 1.2 km | MPC · JPL |
| 418975 | 2009 HW_{91} | — | April 29, 2009 | Kitt Peak | Spacewatch | · | 2.0 km | MPC · JPL |
| 418976 | 2009 HA_{100} | — | April 27, 2009 | Mount Lemmon | Mount Lemmon Survey | · | 710 m | MPC · JPL |
| 418977 | 2009 HM_{100} | — | April 29, 2009 | Kitt Peak | Spacewatch | · | 1.3 km | MPC · JPL |
| 418978 | 2009 HG_{105} | — | October 17, 2007 | Mount Lemmon | Mount Lemmon Survey | V | 720 m | MPC · JPL |
| 418979 | 2009 HJ_{106} | — | April 18, 2009 | Mount Lemmon | Mount Lemmon Survey | L5 | 9.5 km | MPC · JPL |
| 418980 | 2009 JO_{7} | — | April 29, 2009 | Mount Lemmon | Mount Lemmon Survey | EUN | 1.7 km | MPC · JPL |
| 418981 | 2009 JG_{8} | — | May 13, 2009 | Kitt Peak | Spacewatch | · | 670 m | MPC · JPL |
| 418982 | 2009 JQ_{11} | — | April 23, 2009 | Kitt Peak | Spacewatch | · | 810 m | MPC · JPL |
| 418983 | 2009 KS_{1} | — | April 21, 2009 | Kitt Peak | Spacewatch | NYS | 980 m | MPC · JPL |
| 418984 | 2009 KZ_{1} | — | May 18, 2009 | Skylive | Tozzi, F. | PHO | 1.2 km | MPC · JPL |
| 418985 | 2009 KL_{6} | — | May 25, 2009 | Kitt Peak | Spacewatch | · | 1.2 km | MPC · JPL |
| 418986 | 2009 KJ_{9} | — | May 24, 2009 | Kitt Peak | Spacewatch | L5 | 12 km | MPC · JPL |
| 418987 | 2009 KX_{11} | — | March 25, 2009 | Mount Lemmon | Mount Lemmon Survey | L5 | 10 km | MPC · JPL |
| 418988 | 2009 KT_{14} | — | April 17, 2009 | Mount Lemmon | Mount Lemmon Survey | L5 | 8.7 km | MPC · JPL |
| 418989 | 2009 KA_{16} | — | April 27, 2009 | Kitt Peak | Spacewatch | · | 1.1 km | MPC · JPL |
| 418990 | 2009 KY_{18} | — | May 27, 2009 | Mount Lemmon | Mount Lemmon Survey | · | 1.5 km | MPC · JPL |
| 418991 | 2009 LB_{6} | — | December 21, 2003 | Kitt Peak | Spacewatch | V | 830 m | MPC · JPL |
| 418992 | 2009 ME_{3} | — | May 27, 2009 | Mount Lemmon | Mount Lemmon Survey | · | 1.7 km | MPC · JPL |
| 418993 | 2009 MS_{9} | — | June 25, 2009 | Mauna Kea | Petit, J.-M., B. Gladman, J. J. Kavelaars | T_{j} (1.55) · centaur | 23 km | MPC · JPL |
| 418994 | 2009 NG | — | July 4, 2009 | La Sagra | OAM | · | 2.7 km | MPC · JPL |
| 418995 | 2009 OP | — | July 16, 2009 | La Sagra | OAM | JUN | 1.4 km | MPC · JPL |
| 418996 | 2009 OH_{10} | — | July 29, 2009 | La Sagra | OAM | · | 2.4 km | MPC · JPL |
| 418997 | 2009 OP_{10} | — | July 27, 2009 | Kitt Peak | Spacewatch | L5 | 10 km | MPC · JPL |
| 418998 | 2009 OY_{10} | — | July 28, 2009 | Catalina | CSS | · | 1.8 km | MPC · JPL |
| 418999 | 2009 OE_{12} | — | June 16, 2009 | Mount Lemmon | Mount Lemmon Survey | MAR | 1.1 km | MPC · JPL |
| 419000 | 2009 OW_{13} | — | January 24, 2007 | Mount Lemmon | Mount Lemmon Survey | · | 1.9 km | MPC · JPL |

back to top

== Meaning of names ==
As minor planet discoveries are confirmed, they are given a permanent number by the IAU's Minor Planet Center (MPC), and the discoverers can then submit names for them, following the IAU's naming conventions. The list below concerns those minor planets in the specified number-range that have received names, and explains the meanings of those names.

Official naming citations of newly named small Solar System bodies are approved and published in a bulletin by IAU's Working Group for Small Bodies Nomenclature (WGSBN). Before May 2021, citations were published in MPC's Minor Planet Circulars for many decades. Recent citations can also be found on the JPL Small-Body Database (SBDB). Until his death in 2016, German astronomer Lutz D. Schmadel compiled these citations into the Dictionary of Minor Planet Names (DMP) and regularly updated the collection.

Based on Paul Herget's The Names of the Minor Planets, Schmadel also researched the unclear origin of numerous asteroids, most of which had been named prior to World War II. This article incorporates text from this source, which is in the public domain: SBDB New namings may only be added to this list below after official publication as the preannouncement of names is condemned. The WGSBN publishes a comprehensive guideline for the naming rules of non-cometary small Solar System bodies.

| Named minor planet | Provisional | This minor planet was named for... | Ref · Catalog |
|---|---|---|---|
| 418220 Kęstutis | 2008 CL_{177} | Kęstutis (1297–1382) was Grand Duke of Lithuania. | JPL · 418220 |
| 418419 Lacanto | 2008 MT_{1} | The Jesuit school in the medieval town of Porrentruy, Switzerland, was founded in 1591 by the bishop of Basel, Jacques-Christophe Blarer of Wartensee. In 1979 the old school became the Lycée cantonal, which is nicknamed "La Canto" by students. The discoverer has taught physics there for more than thirty years. | IAU · 418419 |
| 418532 Saruman | 2008 SZ_{84} | Saruman is a fictional character in J. R. R. Tolkien's fantasy novel "The Lord of the Rings". | JPL · 418532 |
| 418689 Gema | 2008 UQ_{4} | The Asociación deportiva GEMA (Grupo de Espeleólogia Murcielago Alegre), is a speleology group based in Gijon, Asturias, Spain. | IAU · 418689 |
| 418891 Vizi | 2008 YK_{148} | Szilveszter E. Vizi (born 1936), a Hungarian physician, neuroscientist, pharmacologist and university professor | JPL · 418891 |
