= Peters (surname) =

Peters is a patronymic surname (Peter's son) of Low German, Dutch, and English origin. It can also be an English translation of Gaelic Mac Pheadair (same meaning) or an Americanized form of cognate surnames like Peeters or Pieters.

== Geographical distribution ==
As of 2014, 34.4% of all known bearers of the surname Peters were residents of the United States (frequency 1:2,037), 23.6% of Germany (1:658), 6.4% of the Netherlands (1:511), 5.4% of Canada (1:1,328), 5.2% of Nigeria (1:6,574), 4.8% of England (1:2,261), 3.9% of South Africa (1:2,708), 3.1% of Australia (1:1,482), 1.2% of Togo (1:1,226), 1.1% of Sierra Leone (1:1,214) and 1.0% of Belgium (1:2,220).

In Germany, the frequency of the surname was higher than national average (1:658) in the following states:

1. Schleswig-Holstein (1:209)
2. Mecklenburg-Vorpommern (1:220)
3. Hamburg (1:293)
4. Lower Saxony (1:364)
5. North Rhine-Westphalia (1:402)
6. Bremen (1:471)

In the Netherlands, the frequency of the surname was higher than national average (1:511) in the following provinces:

1. Gelderland (1:198)
2. Limburg (1:215)
3. Bonaire (1:322)
4. North Brabant (1:433)

== People ==
=== Academics ===
- Achim Peters (born 1957), German obesity specialist
- Anne Peters (born 1964), German-Swiss legal scholar
- Arno Peters (1916–2002), German filmmaker & historian. Peters map projection.
- Bernard Peters (1910–1993), German nuclear physicist
- Brett Peters, American industrial engineer and college dean
- C. J. Peters (Clarence James Peters; born 1940), American virologist and tropical physician
- Christian August Friedrich Peters (1806–1880), German astronomer
- Christian Heinrich Friedrich Peters (1813–1890), German-born American astronomer
- David Peters (professor), American physician and healthcare academic
- Dennis G. Peters (1937–2020), American analytical chemist
- Diane L. Peters, American mechanical engineer
- E. L. Peters (1916–1987), British social anthropologist
- Eduard Peters (1869–1948), German prehistorian
- Edward Peters (scholar) (born 1936), American historian of medieval Europe
- Evan Peters (born 1987), American actor
- Francis Edward Peters (1927–2020), American scholar on Middle Eastern religions
- Frank Peters (college president) (1920–1987), Canadian university president
- George Henry Peters (1863–1947), American astronomer
- James A. Peters (1922–1972), American herpetologist
- James L. Peters (1889–1952), American ornithologist
- Jan Peters (computer scientist) (born 1976), German computer scientist
- Jan Peters (engineer), British engineer
- Jan-Michael Peters (born 1962), German cell and molecular biologist
- John Durham Peters (born 1958), communications professor
- John F. Peters (1884–1969), American electrical engineer and inventor
- Kara Peters, American mechanical and aerospace engineer
- Keith Peters (physician) (born 1938), Welsh physician and academic
- Klaus Peters (1937–2014), German mathematician and publisher
- Kurt Peters (chemist) (1897–1978), Austrian chemist
- Mary Peters Fieser (1909–1997), née Mary Peters, American chemist
- Michael Peters (psychologist) (born 1942), Canadian psychologist
- Michael Adrian Peters (born 1948), New Zealand education academic
- Norbert Peters (engineer) (1942–2015), Austrian-German chemical engineer
- Norbert Peters (priest) (1863–1938), German Catholic biblical scholar
- Otto Peters (born 1926), German education academic
- Pam Peters (born 1942), Australian linguist
- Paul Peters (publisher) (born 1982), American academic publisher
- Paul Evan Peters (1947–1996), American librarian
- Peter J. Peters (born 1957), Dutch cellular immunologist
- Raymond Peters (1918–1995), British polymer chemist
- Rebecca Todd Peters (born 1967), American feminist and Christian social ethicist
- Reinhard Peters (1926–2008), German operatic conductor, violinist and academic teacher
- Richard Stanley Peters (1919–2011), British philosopher
- Robert Henry Peters (1946–1996), Canadian ecologist and limnologist
- Rudolph Peters (1889–1982), British biochemist
- Rudolph F. Peters (1943–2022), Dutch scholar of Islam
- Steve Peters (psychiatrist) (born 1953), English sports psychiatrist
- Stormy Peters, American information technologist
- Thomas Minott Peters (1810–1888), American lawyer, Alabama Chief Justice, and botanist
- Tim Peters (software engineer), American software developer
- Vera Peters (1911–1993), Canadian oncologist and clinical investigator
- Wallace Peters (1924–2018), British entomologist and parasitologist
- Wilhelm Peters (1815–1883), German explorer and naturalist
- William John Peters (1863–1942), American explorer and geologist

=== Arts ===
==== Musical ====
- Ben Peters (1933–2005), American country music songwriter
- Bernadette Peters (born 1948), American actress and singer
- Brian Peters (folk singer), English folk singer and multi-instrumentalist
- Carl Friedrich Peters (1779–1827), German music publisher
- Ciska Peters (born 1945), Dutch pop singer
- Clarence Peters (born 1980s), Nigerian music video director, filmmaker and cinematographer
- Claudette Peters (born 1979), Antiguan soca singer-songwriter
- Crispian St. Peters (1939–2010), English pop singer-songwriter
- Cyndee Peters (born 1946), American-Swedish gospel singer and author
- Dan Peters (born 1967), American rock drummer
- Dave Peters, American heavy metal musician
- Duane Peters (born 1961), skateboarder and punk singer/songwriter
- Edith Peters (1926–2000), American singer and film actress
- Eric Peters (musician) (born 1972), American musician
- Finn Peters, British flautist and saxophonist
- Gretchen Peters (born 1957), American country singer
- Grice Peters, English art rock musician
- Ingrid Peters (born 1954), German singer
- Ivana Peters (born 1974), Serbian pop rock musician
- JJ Peters (born 1982), Australian rock musician
- Jane Peters (born 1963), Australian classical violinist
- Jerry Peters (born 1940s), American funk and soul musician
- Johanna Peters (1932–2000), Scottish mezzo-soprano
- Jonathan Peters (born 1969), American DJ and record producer
- Lennie Peters (1931–1992), British singer from Peters and Lee
- Linda Peters (born 1947), English folk rock singer a.k.a. Linda Thompson
- Mark Peters (musician) (born 1975), English musician, songwriter and producer
- Mary Peters (hymn writer) (1813–1856), British hymn writer
- Maisie Peters (born 2000), English singer-songwriter
- Mike Peters (drummer), Canadian punk drummer
- Mike Peters (musician) (1959–2025), Welsh singer and songwriter of "The Alarm"
- Mitchell Peters (1935–2017), American percussionist and composer
- Moriah Peters (born 1992), American Christian singer and songwriter
- Nick Peters (born 1997), guitarist for Bears in Trees
- Norbert Walter Peters (born 1954), German composer
- Randolph Peters (born 1959), Canadian composer
- Red Peters (born 1950), American musician and comedian, pseudonym of Douglas Stevens
- Roberta Peters (1930–2017), American coloratura soprano
- Ryan Peters (musician), Canadian singer-songwriter
- Ryan Michael Peters (born 1985), American rapper known as "Spose"
- Scott Peters (musician), Canadian folk rock musician
- Shina Peters (born 1958), Nigerian musician
- Suresh Peters (born 1968), Indian music director and playback rapper/singer
- Vanessa Peters (born 1980), American folk rock singer-songwriter
- Wilfred Peters (1931–2010), Belizean accordionist and band leader
- The Peters Sisters – Mattie (1917–1983), Anne (1920–1965), and Virginia (1923–2010) – American vocal trio

==== Theatrical ====
- Anton Peters (1923–1989), Belgian actor and film director
- Arnold Peters (1925–2013), British actor
- Audrey Peters (1927–2019), American soap opera actress
- Bernadette Peters (born 1948), American actress and singer
- Brock Peters (1927–2005), American actor
- Caroline Peters (born 1971), German actress
- Cece Peters, Australian television actress
- Christel Peters (1916–2009), German stage and television actress
- Clarke Peters (born 1952), pseudonym of American actor Peter Clarke
- Dennis Alaba Peters (c. 1935 – 1996), Gambian actor
- Edith Peters (1926–2000), American singer and film actress
- Emma Peters (born 1978), Swedish actress
- Evan Peters (born 1987), American film actor
- Frederick Peters (actor) (1884–1963), American film actor
- Gordon Peters (1926–2022), British television actor
- House Peters Jr. (1916–2008), American character actor
- House Peters Sr. (1880–1967), British-born American silent film actor
- Ina Peters (1928–2004), Austrian stage and film actress
- Jane Alice Peters (1908–1942), American film actress with the stage name Carole Lombard
- Jean Peters (1926–2000), American actress
- Jon Peters (born 1945), American film producer
- Karl-Heinz Peters (1903–1990), German film actor
- Lauri Peters (born 1943), American actress
- Luan Peters (1946–2017), English actress and singer
- Lyn Peters (c. 1941 – 2013), Argentine-born British-American model, actress and caterer
- Maria Peters (born 1958), Dutch film director, producer and screenwriter
- Michael Peters (choreographer) (1948–1994), American choreographer
- Molly Peters (1942–2017), British actress
- Pauline Peters (1896–?), Welsh film actress
- Petra Peters (1925–2004), German stage and film actress
- Rick Peters (born 1967), American actor
- Robert O. Peters (born 1973), Nigerian film producer and director
- Russell Peters (born 1970), Canadian comedian
- Sabine Peters (1912–1982), German film actress
- Susan Peters (1921–1952), American actress
- Susan Peters (Nigerian actress) (born 1980), Nigerian film actress
- Vicki Peters (born 1950), American model and actress
- Wendi Peters (born 1968), English stage and television actress
- Werner Peters (1918–1971), German film actor
- William Theodore Peters (1862–1904), American poet and actor
- Willy Peters (1915–1976), Swedish film actor and director

==== Visual ====
- Alan Peters (1933–2009), British furniture maker
- Anna Peters (painter) (1843–1926), German flower and landscape painter, daughter of Pieter Francis Peters
- Christa Peters (1933–1981), German fashion photographer
- Clarissa Peters Russell (1809–1854), American miniaturist
- Curtis Arnoux Peters, Jr. (1904–1968), American cartoonist known as "Curtis Arno"
- Eric Peters (painter) (born 1952), German painter
- Eugène Peters (born 1946), Dutch painter, graphic artist and sculptor
- Frazier Forman Peters (1895–1963), American builder and architect
- Fred Peters (artist) (1923–2018), American animator and comics artist
- Giovanni Peters (1624–1677), Italianate name of Flemish painter Jan Peeters
- Greg Peters (1962–2013), American editorial cartoonist
- Hans Peters (1894–1976), English art director
- Ivo Peters (1915–1989), English photographer of steam railways
- Joe Peters (born 1983), American glass artist
- Johann Anton de Peters (1725–1795), German painter and etcher
- Lilo Peters (1913–2001), North German painter and sculptor
- Michael Peters (designer) (born 1930s), British graphic designer
- Mike Peters (cartoonist) (born 1943), American cartoonist
- Nelle Peters (1884–1974), American architect
- Pieter Francis Peters (1818–1903), Dutch-born German landscape painter and art dealer
- Pietronella Peters (1848–1924), German portrait and genre painter, daughter of Pieter F. Peters
- Robert L. Peters (1954–2023), Canadian graphics designer and industrial designer
- Sara Peters Grozelier (1821–1907), American miniaturist
- Shani Peters, American artist
- Wilhelm Peters (1851–1935), Norwegian painter
- William Peters (painter) (1742–1814), British painter
- William Wesley Peters (1912–1991), American architect

=== Business ===
- Benedict Peters (born 1966), Nigerian billionaire
- Bob Peters (born 1942), Australian businessman and horse breeder
- Edward C. Peters (1855–1937), American real estate developer in Atlanta, son of Richard Peters (Atlanta)
- George Peters (banker), Governor of the Bank of England, 1785–1787
- Hans-Walter Peters (born 1955), German banker
- Henry Peters (c. 1763 – 1827), British banker and Member of Parliament
- Leone J. Peters (1911–1988), American businessman and racehorse breeder
- Lovett Peters (1913–2010), American oil and gas entrepreneur known for the Peters Foundation
- Ralph Peters (railroad executive) (1853–1923), American railroad executive
- Richard Peters (Atlanta) (1810–1889), American railroad man, cofounder of Atlanta City
- Richard Peters (clubman) (1848–1921), American civil engineer and railroad executive, son of the above
- Russ Peters (born 1940s), British ferry businessman
- Tom Peters (born 1942), American business consultant and writer

=== Law ===
- Aulana L. Peters (born c. 1950), American lawyer
- Charles Jeffery Peters (1773–1848), New Brunswick lawyer, judge and politician
- Curtis Arnoux Peters (1879–1933), American New York Supreme Court Justice
- Edward N. Peters (born 1957), American canon lawyer
- Ellen Ash Peters (1930–2024), German-born American lawyer and judge
- Elliot R. Peters (born 1958), American trial attorney
- F. Whitten Peters (born 1946), American lawyer, U.S. Secretary of the Air Force 1997–2001
- Frederick Peters (1851–1919), Canadian lawyer, Premier of Prince Edward Island 1891–97
- John A. Peters (1822–1904), American judge and US representative from Maine
- John A. Peters (1864–1953), American judge and US representative from Maine
- John M. Peters (1927–2013), American lawyer and legislator
- Karen K. Peters (born 1947), American jurist
- Karl Peters (jurist) (1904–1998), German expert in criminal law
- Marybeth Peters (1939–2022), American jurist and copyrights expert
- Nigel Peters (born 1952), English judge
- Raymond E. Peters (1903–1973), American Supreme Court of California justice
- Richard Peters, Jr. (1744–1828), Pennsylvania jurist and Continental Congressman
- Richard Peters (reporter) (1780–1848), American jurist and Supreme Court official, son of the above
- Thomas Minott Peters (1810–1888), American lawyer, Alabama Chief Justice, and botanist
- William Peters (lawyer) (1702–1786), American lawyer and judge from Philadelphia

=== Military and police ===
- Alexander Peters (1869–1951), United States Navy sailor
- Arthur Peters (Royal Navy officer) (1888–1979), British Naval Secretary 1941–42
- Frederic Thornton Peters (1889–1942), Canadian Captain in the Royal Navy
- George Peters (aviator) (1894–1959), Australian flying ace in World War I
- George J. Peters (1924–1945), American Medal of Honor recipient
- J. Greg Peters (born 1960), Canadian Mounted Police Superintendent
- John Peters (RAF officer) (born 1961), English pilot of the Royal Air Force
- Kurd Peters (1914–1957), German World War II pilot
- Lawrence D. Peters (1946–1967), United States Marine sergeant
- Ralph Peters (born 1952), American U.S. Army officer and military writer
- Robert Peters (RAF officer) (born 1940), British Royal Air Force officer
- Yakov Peters (Jēkabs Peterss; 1886–1936), Latvian Communist revolutionary and leader of the Soviet secret police

=== Politics ===
- Andrew J. Peters (1872–1938), Mayor of Boston
- Ann Peters, former Health Minister of Grenada
- Annie Peters (1920–2007), South African anti-apartheid activist
- Arnold Peters (politician) (1922–1996), Canadian politician
- Arthur Peters (1854–1908), Canadian politician, Premier of Prince Edward Island
- Arthur Peters (British politician) (1867–1956), British Liberal Party politician
- Augustus W. Peters (1844–1898), Canadian-born New York City politician
- Bobby Peters (born 1949), American mayor and judge
- Carl Peters (1856–1918), German colonial ruler, explorer, politician and author
- Daniel Peters (born 1981), German politician
- David Peters (politician) (born 1954), American (Massachusetts) politician
- Deb Peters (born 1974), American (South Dakota) politician
- Dipuo Peters (born 1960), South African Premier of the Northern Cape, Minister of Energy and Minister of Transport
- Douglas Peters (1930–2016), Canadian banker and politician
- Douglas J. J. Peters (born 1963), American (Maryland) politician
- Ellen Dolly Peters (1894–1995), Montserratian teacher and trade unionist
- Everett R. Peters (1894–1972), American (Illinois) farmer and politician
- F. Whitten Peters (born 1946), American lawyer, U.S. Secretary of the Air Force 1997–2001
- Fred Peters (politician) (1867–1935), Dutch-born American (Utah) politician
- Frederick Peters (1851–1919), Canadian lawyer, Premier of Prince Edward Island 1891–97
- Gary Peters (born 1958), American (Michigan) politician and businessman
- George Silas Peters (1846–1928), American mayor of Columbus, Ohio, 1881–1882
- Harry Peters (politician) (1788–1870), New Brunswick merchant and politician
- Henry Peters (Australian politician) (1881–1918), New South Wales politician
- Henry M. Peters (1889–1987), American (Wisconsin) politician
- Ian Peters (born 1941), New Zealand politician
- Jan Peters (communist) (1886–1938), one name of Latvian Communist revolutionary Jēkabs Peterss
- Jeremy W. Peters (born c. 1980), American journalist and politics reporter
- Jesse Peters (1897–1962), American (Wisconsin) politician
- Jim Peters (politician) (born 1937), New Zealand politician
- John A. Peters (1822–1904), American judge and US representative from Maine
- John A. Peters (1864–1953), American judge and US representative from Maine
- John E. Peters (1839–1919), businessman and politician in Newfoundland
- John M. Peters (1927–2013), American lawyer and legislator
- John Samuel Peters (1772–1858), American politician and governor of Connecticut
- Joshua Peters (born 1987), American (Missouri) politician
- Kathleen Peters (born 1961), American (Florida) politician
- Leonard Antoon Hubert Peters (1900–1984), Dutch minister of Kingdom Relations 1951–52
- Louanner Peters (born c. 1950), American (Illinois) politician
- Maria Liberia Peters (born 1941), Prime Minister of the Netherlands Antilles 1984–86
- Mariko Peters (born 1969), Dutch politician
- Mary Ann Peters (born 1951), American diplomat; CEO of the Carter Center
- Mary E. Peters (born 1948), American politician; US Secretary of Transportation 2006–09
- Mason S. Peters (1844–1914), American politician, U.S. Representative from Kansas
- Nellie Peters Black (née Nellie Peters; 1851–1919), American women's rights activist
- Paul Peters (born 1942), Dutch politician
- Rebecca Peters, Australian gun control activist
- Richard Peters, Jr. (1744–1828), Pennsylvania jurist and Continental Congressman
- Robert Peters (Illinois politician) (born 1985/86), American politician in Illinois
- Rudi Peters (1939–2002), Canadian (Saskatchewan) politician
- Ryan Peters (politician) (born c. 1982), American politician in New Jersey
- Samuel R. Peters (1842–1910), American politician, U.S. congressman from Kansas
- Scott Peters (politician) (born 1958), American politician, U.S. congressman from San Diego
- Sidney Peters (1885–1976), English Liberal Party politician
- Steve Peters (Manitoba politician) (1912–1976), Canadian (Manitoba) politician
- Steve Peters (Ontario politician) (born 1963), Canadian (Ontario) politician
- Susan Peters (politician), Californian (Sacramento) politician
- Tara Peters, American politician from Missouri
- Ted Peters (politician) (1897–1980), Australian Labor Party politician
- Tina Peters (politician) (born 1955), former Mesa County, Colorado, clerk and recorder, convicted of crimes related to 2020 election conspiracy theories
- Thomas Peters (1738–1792), Nigerian-born African-American founding father of Sierra Leone
- William Peters (Australian politician) (1903–1978), Australian (New South Wales) politician
- William Peters (diplomat) (1923–2014), British diplomat and founder of Jubilee 2000
- William H. Peters (1825–?), Wisconsin legislator
- William Thompson Peters (1805–1885), American politician
- Winston Peters (born 1945), New Zealand politician and leader of New Zealand First
- Winston "Gypsy" Peters (born 1952), Trinidad and Tobago calypsonian and politician
- Yakov Peters (Jēkabs Peterss; 1886–1936), Latvian Communist revolutionary and leader of the Soviet secret police

=== Radio and television ===
- Andi Peters (born 1970), British television presenter
- Butz Peters (born 1958), German television presenter
- Jean Peters (born 1984), German investigative journalist
- John Peters (DJ) (died 2025), British radio presenter
- Susan Peters (TV anchor) (born 1956), American news anchor
- Sylvia Peters (1925–2016), English television continuity announcer and presenter

=== Religion ===
- Arthur Peters (bishop) (born 1935), Canadian Anglican bishop
- Christopher Peters (born 1950s), Anglican Church leader in Ireland
- George N. H. Peters (1825–1909), American Lutheran minister
- Hugh Peters (1598–1660), English Puritan minister and propagandist for Oliver Cromwell
- Humphrey Peters, Pakistani Anglican bishop
- John Punnett Peters (1852–1921), American Episcopal clergyman
- Jörg Michael Peters (born 1960), German Catholic auxiliary bishop
- Karl E. Peters (born 1939), American theologist and religious naturalist
- Madison Clinton Peters (1859–1918), American clergyman
- Richard Peters (priest) (1704–1776), English-born Pennsylvania colonial Anglican clergyman
- Samuel Peters (clergyman) (1735–1826), Connecticut Anglican clergyman
- Ted Peters (theologian) (born 1941), American Lutheran theologian

=== Sports ===
- Adam Peters (born 1979), American football executive
- Adam Peters (rugby league) (born 1974), Australian rugby league footballer
- Akeira Peters (born 1993), Grenadian cricketer
- Alec Peters (born 1995), American basketball player
- Alex Peters (born 1994), English road cyclist
- Anderson Peters (born 1997), Grenadian javelin thrower
- Andrew Peters (born 1980) Canadian ice hockey player
- Ann-Louise Peters (born 1975), Danish darts player
- Annette Peters (born 1965), American long-distance runner
- Anthony Peters (soccer) (born 1983), American soccer player
- Anthony Peters (racewalker) (born 1996), American racewalker
- Artuur Peters (born 1996), Belgian canoeist
- Ayodele Peters (born 1957), Nigerian boxer
- Bart Peters (born 1965), Dutch rower
- Bas Peters (born 1976), Dutch mountain biker
- Beate Peters (born 1959), West German javelin thrower
- Bert Peters (1908–1944), Australian rules footballer
- Bill Peters (footballer) (1898–1957), Australian footballer
- Bill Peters (ice hockey) (born 1965), Canadian ice hockey player and coach
- Bob Peters (1937–2021), Canadian ice hockey coach
- Brandon Peters (born 1997), American football quarterback
- Brian Peters (gridiron football) (born 1988), American football linebacker
- Carl-Ludwig Peters (1921-?), German field hockey player
- Carol Ann Peters (1932–2022), American ice dancer
- Cas Peters (born 1993), Dutch football winger
- Chris Peters (born 1972), American baseball pitcher
- Clara Peters (born 1991), Irish figure skater
- Connor Peters (born 1996), English-Antiguan footballer
- Corey Peters (born 1988), American football defensive tackle
- Corey Peters (alpine skier) (born 1983), New Zealand alpine skier
- Corinne Peters (born 1960), Canadian curler
- Daley Peters (born 1984), Canadian curler
- Dan Peters (basketball) (1954–2014), American basketball coach
- Darren Peters, Australian Paralympic Committee official
- Dean Peters (1958–1998), American wrestler known as "Brady Boone" or "Battle Kat"
- Devereaux Peters (born 1989), American basketball player
- Dietmar Peters (born 1949), German ice hockey player
- Dillon Peters (born 1992), American baseball pitcher
- Dimitri Peters (born 1984), Russian-born German judoka
- Dominic Peters (born 1978), English rugby player
- Don Peters (born 1949), American gymnastics coach
- Dwight Peters (born 1986), Guyanese football midfielder
- Elisabeth Peters (born 1987), Canadian curler
- Emmitt Peters (1940–2020), American dog sled racer
- Eric Peters (rugby union) (born 1969), Scottish rugby player
- Erich Peters (1920–2012), Swedish gymnast
- F. H. Peters (1879–1970), American college football coach
- Floyd Peters (1936–2008), American football defensive tackle
- Frank Peters (footballer) (1910–?), English footballer
- Frank Peters (ice hockey) (1902–1973), American ice hockey player
- Frosty Peters (1904–1980), American football player
- Gail Peters (born 1929), American swimmer
- Garry Peters (born 1942), Canadian ice hockey player and coach
- Garry Peters (footballer) (born 1945), Australian rules footballer
- Garry Peters (gridiron football) (born 1991), American player of Canadian football
- Gary Peters (baseball player) (1937–2023), American baseball player
- Gary Peters (footballer) (born 1954), English footballer and manager
- Geoff Peters, British sports commentator and broadcaster
- George Peters (footballer) (1912–1988), Australian footballer
- Gerard Peters (1920–2005), Dutch track and road cyclist
- Haley Peters (born 1992), American basketball player
- Hank Peters (1924–2015), American baseball executive
- Hanns Peters (1930–2015), German rower
- Heinrich Peters (fl. 1900), German Olympic sailor
- Herman Peters (1899–1989), Australian rugby player
- Hilda Peters (born 1983), New Zealand rugby player
- Jack Peters (fl. 1890s), English footballer
- Jacob Peters (swimmer) (born 2000), British swimmer
- Jaime Peters (born 1987), Canadian soccer player
- Jaison Peters (born 1989), Montserratian cricketer
- Jamal Peters (born 1996), American football player
- James Peters (rugby player) (1879–1954), English rugby player
- Jan Peters (born 1954), Dutch international football midfielder
- Jan Peters (born 1953), Dutch football forward
- Jason Peters (born 1982), American football player
- Jelani Peters (born 1993), Trinidadian footballer
- Jim Peters (athlete) (1918–1999), English long-distance runner
- Jimmy Peters, Jr. (born 1944), Canadian ice hockey player
- Jimmy Peters, Sr. (1922–2006), Canadian ice hockey player
- Joanne Peters (born 1979), Australian soccer player
- John Peters (catcher) (1893–1932), American baseball player
- John Peters (shortstop) (1850–1924), American baseball player
- Jon Peters (pitcher) (born c. 1970), American baseball pitcher
- Jordens Peters (born 1987), Dutch football defender
- Josef Peters (racing driver) (1914–2001), German Formula One driver
- Josh Peters (rugby union) (born 1995), Spanish rugby player
- Justin Peters (born 1986), Canadian ice hockey goaltender
- Kari Peters (born 1985), Luxembourgish cross-country skier
- Kasey Peters (born 1987), American football player
- Keith Peters (footballer) (1915–1989), English football defender
- Keith Peters (rugby league) (born 1986), Papua New Guinean rugby player
- Ken Peters (1915–2013), American baseball player and school superintendent
- Kenroy Peters (born 1982), St Vincent cricketer
- Kerstin Peters (born 1967), German rower
- Laine Peters (born 1970), Canadian curler
- Laurie Peters (1916–2011), Australian rules footballer
- Leonard Peters (born 1981), Samoan American football safety and rugby player
- Lexi Peters (born 1997), American ice hockey player
- Liam Peters (born 1997), South African cricketer
- Lisa Peters (born c. 1980), Welsh curler
- Luisa Peters (born 1993), Cook Islands weightlifter
- Lyle Peters (born 1991), South African footballer
- Marcus Peters (born 1993), American football cornerback
- Margaret Peters (1915–2004), American tennis player
- Marjorie Peters (1918–2016), American baseball player
- Mark Peters (footballer, born 1972), Welsh football defender
- Mark Peters (footballer, born 1983), English football forward
- Mark Peters (sport administrator), Australian baseball player and sports executive
- Marnie Peters, Canadian wheelchair basketball player
- Martin Peters (1943–2019), English footballer
- Marty Peters (c. 1913–?), American football player and coach
- Mary Peters (athlete) (born 1939), British athlete
- Maureen Peters (cricketer) (born 1944), New Zealand cricketer
- Maurice Peters (1917–1987), American jockey
- Maxwell Peters (born 1955), Antigua and Barbuda athlete
- Mickey Peters (born 1980), American football wide receiver
- Mitchell Peters (athlete) (born 1970), Virgin Islander sprinter
- Nans Peters (born 1994), French road cyclist
- Nicholas Peters (born 1968), English cricketer
- Nyanforth Peters (born 1975), Liberian footballer
- Orlando Peters (born 1988), Antiguan cricketer
- Otha Peters (born 1994), American football linebacker
- Patrick Peters (born 1987), German football defender
- Paw Peters (born 1976), Danish handballer
- Peter Peters (rugby league) (born 1947), Australian rugby player
- Peter Peters (football official) (born 1962), German journalist and football official
- Piet Peters (1921–2012), Dutch road cyclist
- Ray Peters (1946–2019), American baseball player
- René Peters (footballer) (born 1981), Luxembourgish footballer
- Richard Peters (cricketer) (1911–1989), English cricketer
- Richard Peters (football coach) (1920–1973), American college football coach
- Ricky Peters (1955–2025), American baseball player
- Robbie Peters (born 1971), English footballer
- Robert Peters (cyclist) (born 1970), Antiguan cyclist
- Rodrigo Peters Marques (born 1985), Brazilian football goalkeeper nicknamed "Café"
- Roger Peters (born 1944), English football winger
- Rotimi Peters (born 1955), Nigerian sprinter
- Roumania Peters (1917–2003), American tennis player
- Rube Peters (1885–1965), American baseball pitcher
- Rusty Peters (1914–2003), American baseball player
- Ryan Peters (footballer) (born 1987), English footballer
- Scott Peters (American football) (born 1978), American football offensive lineman
- Seaver Peters (1932–2020), American ice hockey player
- Shanaka Peters (born 1991), Sri Lankan weightlifter
- Shannon Peters (born 1969), Australian tennis player
- Sherwin Peters (born 1990), Leeward Islands cricketer
- Sonja Peters (born 1976), Dutch wheelchair tennis player
- Steffen Peters (born 1964), German-born American equestrian
- Stephen Peters (born 1978), English cricketer
- Steve Peters (baseball) (born 1962), American baseball pitcher
- Steve Peters (ice hockey) (born 1960), Canadian ice hockey forward
- Thoralf Peters (born 1968), German rower
- Timothy Peters (born 1980), American racing driver
- Tina Peters (field hockey) (born 1968), German field hockey player
- Tony Peters (born 1953), American football safety
- Trevor Peters (born 1990), British Virgin Islands footballer
- Tristan Peters (born 2000), Canadian baseball player
- Ulrich Peters (canoeist) (born 1951), West German slalom canoeist
- Ulrich Peters (basketball) (born 1957), German basketball player
- Vic Peters (1955–2016), Canadian curler
- Violet Peters (born c. 1930), Indian sprinter
- Violetta Peters (born 1977), German-born, Austrian slalom canoeist
- Vivian Peters (born 1975), Nigerian shot putter
- Volney Peters (1928–2015), American football defensive tackle
- W. S. Peters (1867–1933), African-American baseball player, manager, and owner
- Warren Peters (born 1982), Canadian hockey player
- Wayne Peters (born 1969), Australian rules footballer
- Willem Peters (1903–1995), Dutch triple jump athlete
- William Peters (sport shooter) (1925–1992), Colombian Olympic shooter
- Willie Peters (born 1979), Australian rugby player
- Wolfgang Peters (1929–2003), German football winger
- Wolfgang Peters (canoeist) (born 1948), West German slalom canoeist
- Nick Peters (1939–2015), American baseball writer

=== Writers ===
- A. D. Peters (1892–1973), British literary agent
- Carl Peters (1856–1918), German colonial ruler, explorer, politician and author
- Cash Peters (born 1956), British travel writer
- Charles Peters (1926–2023), American journalist, editor, and author
- Christoph Peters (born 1966), German novelist
- Edgar E. Peters (born 1952), asset manager and writer
- Elizabeth Peters (1927–2013), pseudonym of American author Barbara Mertz
- Ellis Peters (1913–1995), pseudonym of English author Edith Pargeter
- Eugenia Peters (1730–1783), English letter writer and publisher
- Frank Peters Jr. (1930–2007), American journalist
- Gretchen Peters (journalist), American journalist and organized crime expert
- Joan Peters (1938–2015), American journalist
- John Peters (chess player) (born 1951), American chess player and newspaper columnist
- Julie Anne Peters (1952–2023), American children's writer
- Lenrie Peters (1932–2009), Gambian surgeon, novelist, poet and educationist
- Louise Otto-Peters (1819–1895), German suffragist and writer
- Lulu Hunt Peters (1873–1930), American physician, dietitian and author
- Margot Peters (1933–2022), American novelist and biographer
- Maureen Peters (novelist) (1935–2008), Welsh historical novelist
- Nancy Peters (born 1936), American author and publisher
- Nonja Peters (born c. 1945), Dutch-born Australian author
- Paula Peters (born c. 1966), Native American journalist
- Petresia Peters (1834–1924), American author and editor; pen name of Julia Carter Aldrich
- Phillis Wheatley Peters (c. 1753 – 1784), African-American poet
- Robert Peters (1924–2014), American poet
- Roy Peters, pseudonym of English western writer Arthur Nickson (1902–1974)
- Scott Peters (writer), Canadian television director and screenwriter
- Torrey Peters (born 1981), American author
- William Peters (journalist) (1921–2007), American journalist and documentary filmmaker

=== Other ===
- Alice E. Heckler Peters (1845–1921), American social reformer
- Amina Lahbabi-Peters, Moroccan interpreter and translator
- Braden Peters (born 2005), American streamer, known online as Clavicular
- Carl Peters (1856–1918), German colonial ruler, explorer, politician and author
- David Peters (poker player) (born 1987), American poker player
- Demi-Leigh Nel-Peters (born 1995), South African model, Miss South Africa 2017, and Miss Universe 2017
- Erik Peters (born 1930s), Canadian civil servant
- Frederick Emerson Peters (1885–1959), American fraudster
- Hans Peters (fl. 2001), Dutch game show contestant
- J. Peters (1894–1990), pseudonym of Hungarian-born Soviet spy master Sándor Goldberger
- Karl Peters (1856–1918), German traveller in East Africa Carl Peters
- Lana Peters (1926–2011), adopted name of Stalin's youngest child, who defected to the United States
- Lily Peters (died 2022), American female murder victim
- Mary Peters (1852–1921), Native American (Umpqua) woman and ferry operator in Oregon
- Paul Douglas Peters, person convicted after 2011 Australian bomb hoax
- Rachel Peters (born 1991), Filipino-British model, beauty queen, and Miss Universe Philippines 2017
- Steve Peters (game designer) (born 1961), American game designer
- Susie Peters (1873–1965), American preservationist and Indian Agency matron
- Thomas Peters (supercentenarian) (1745?–1857), Dutchman, possibly first recorded person over 110 years old
- Thomas Kimmwood Peters (1879–1973), American cinema pioneer, photographer, archivist
- Tim A. Peters (born 1950s), American humanitarian aid worker
