= David Peters =

David Peters may refer to:

- David M. Peters Jr. (1911–1956), American politician
- David Peters (politician) (born 1954), American politician
- David Peters (professor), British professor of integrated healthcare at the University of Westminster
- David Peters (poker player) (born 1987), American poker player
- David Peters (paleoartist) (born 1954), American paleoartist
- Peter David, American writer who used David Peters as a pseudonym

== See also ==
- Peter David (disambiguation)
