= Eric Peters =

Eric Peters may refer to:

- Eric Peters (rugby union) (born 1969), Scottish former amateur and professional rugby union player
- Eric Peters (painter) (born 1952), German painter
- Eric Peters (musician) (born 1972), American musician
- Eric Peters (archer) (born 1997), Canadian archer
- Eric Peters (tennis) (1903–1985), British tennis player
