= Carl Peters (disambiguation) =

Carl Peters (1856–1918) was a German explorer and colonial administrator.

Carl or Karl Peters may also refer to:

- Carl Ferdinand Peters (1825–1881), Austrian medical doctor and geologist
- Carl F. W. Peters (1844–1894), German astronomer
- Carl-Ludwig Peters (born 1921), German former field hockey player
- Karl Peters (jurist) (1904–1998), German expert in criminal law, criminal pedagogy and miscarriages of justice
- Karl E. Peters, American religious philosopher
- Carl Peters (film), a 1941 German historical drama film
