= Senator Peters (disambiguation) =

Gary Peters (born 1958) is a U.S. Senator from Michigan since 2015. Senator Peters may also refer to:

- Andrew J. Peters (1872–1938), Massachusetts State Senate
- Deb Peters (born 1974), South Dakota State Senate
- Douglas J. J. Peters (born 1963), Maryland State Senate
- Jesse Peters (1897–1962), Wisconsin State Senate
- Melodie Peters (1947–2023), Connecticut State Senate
- Robert Peters (Illinois politician) (born 1985), Illinois State Senate
- Samuel R. Peters (1842–1910), Kansas State Senate
- Thomas Minott Peters (1810–1888), Alabama State Senate
- William Thompson Peters (1805–1885), Connecticut State Senate

== See also ==
- George Peter (politician, died 1893) (1829–1893), Maryland State Senate
