= Religious views of Abraham Lincoln =

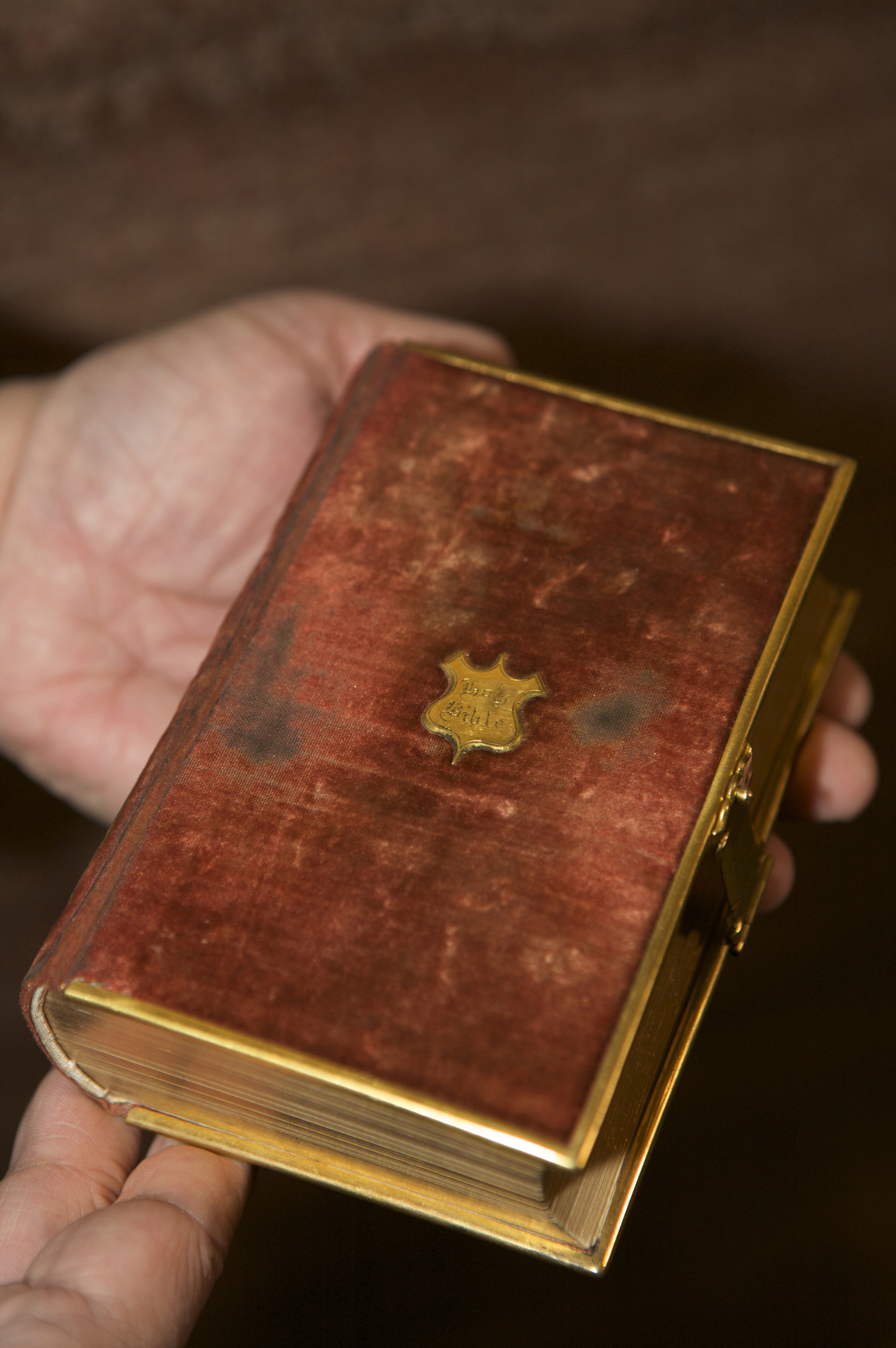
The Bible used at Abraham Lincoln's first inauguration

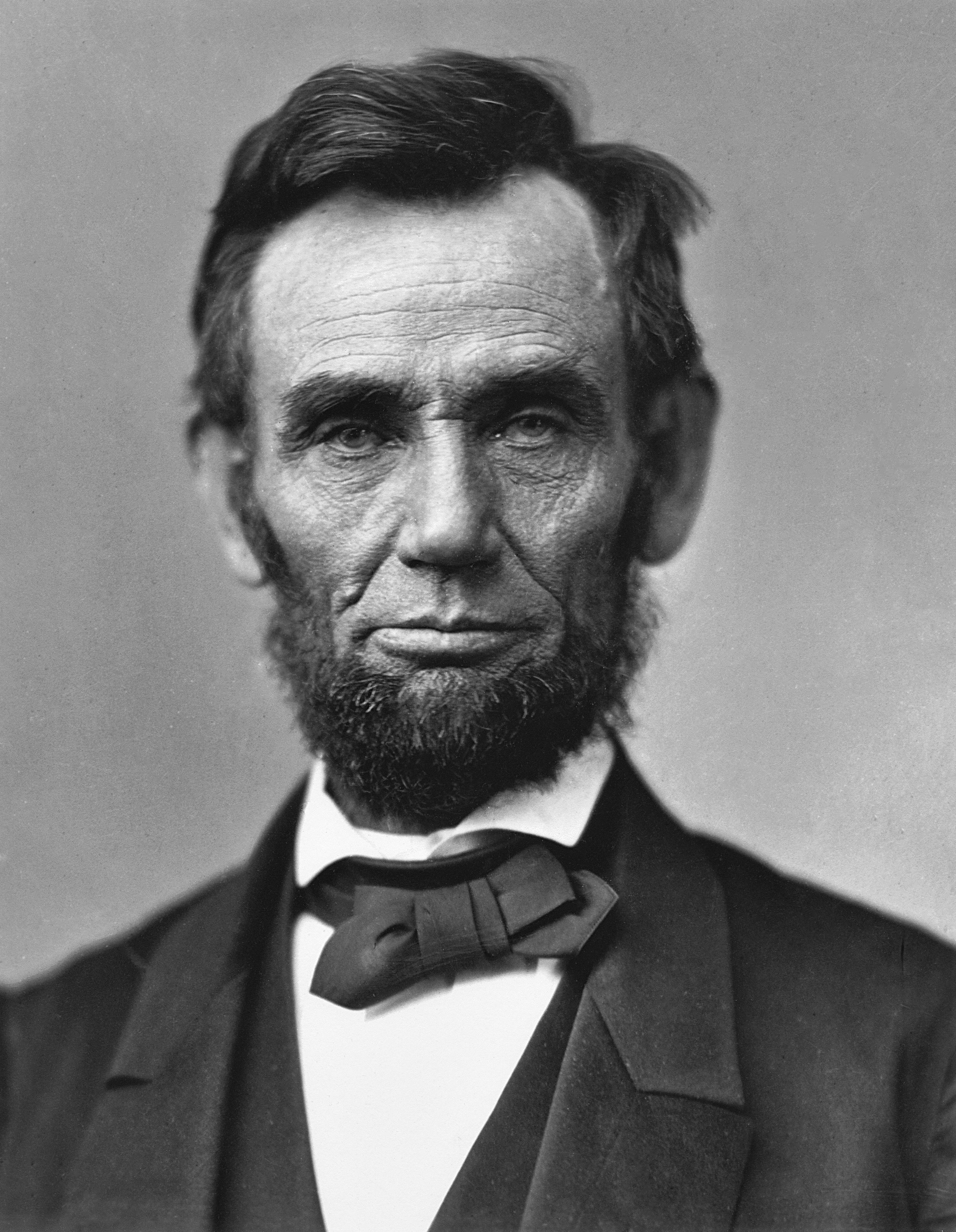
President Lincoln

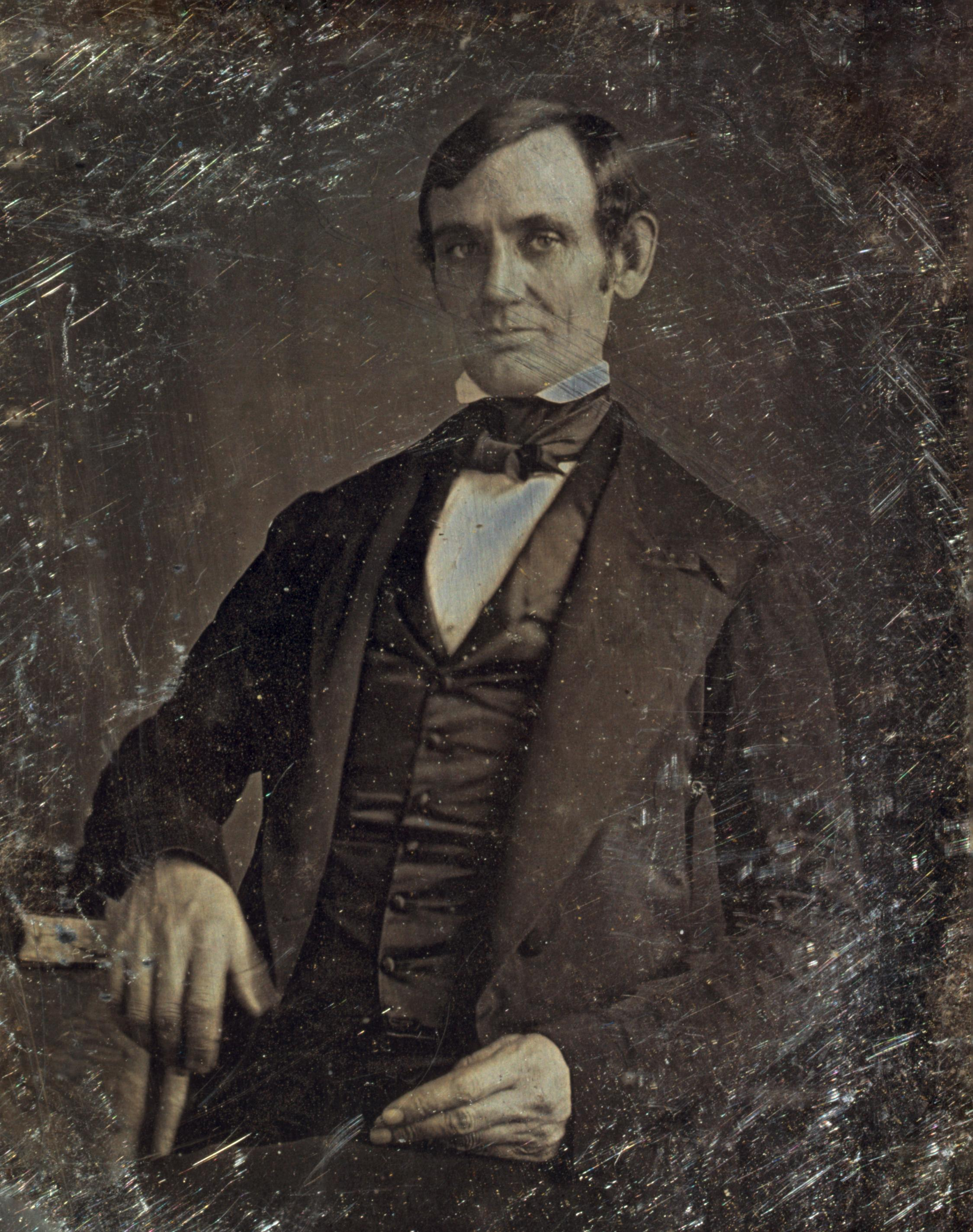
Lincoln in his late 30s as a member of the U.S. House of Representatives. (Photo taken by one of Lincoln's law students around 1846.)

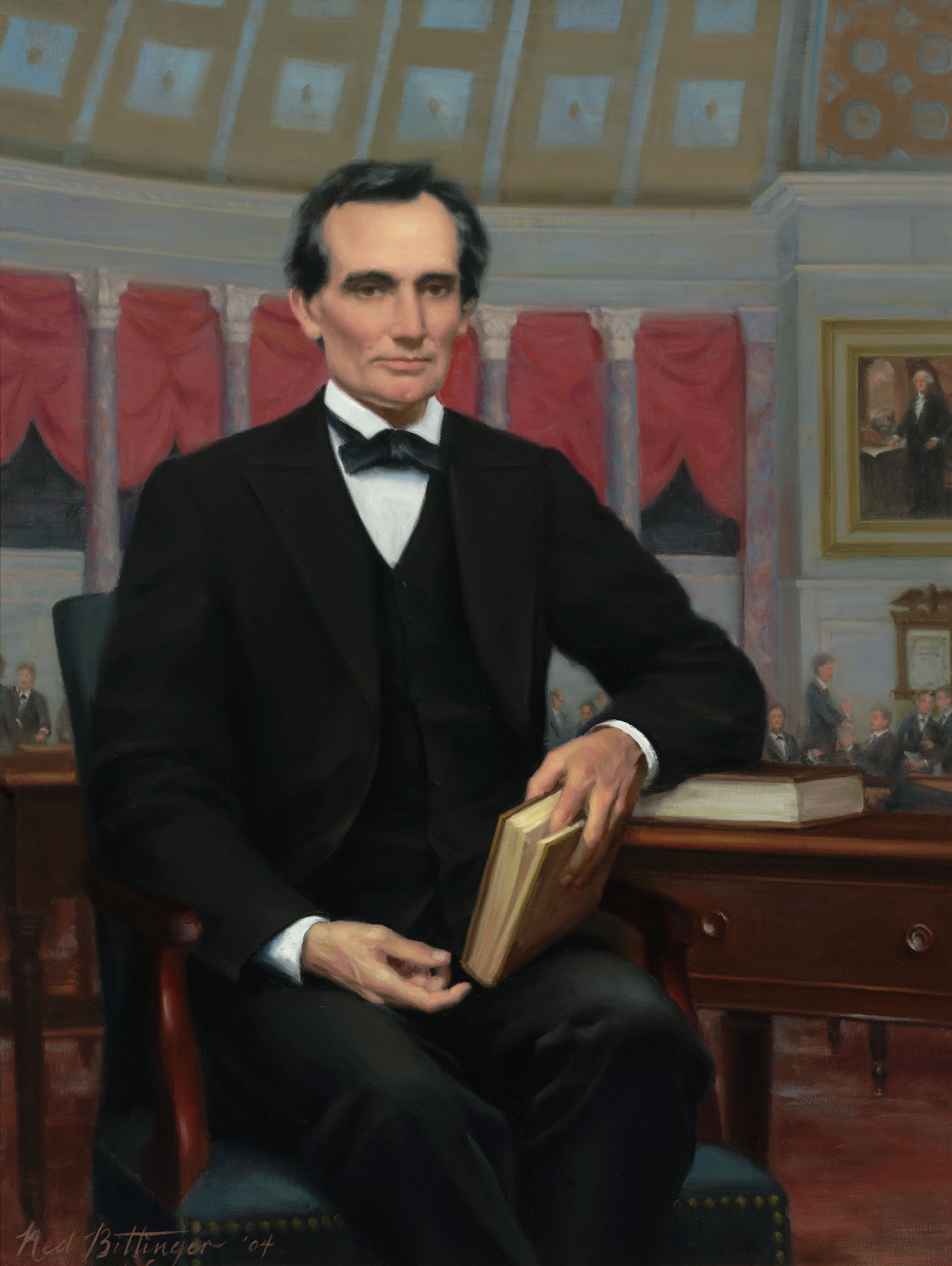
2004 portrait painting of Lincoln serving in Congress by Ned Bittinger, collection of the U.S. House of Representatives

Abraham Lincoln grew up in a highly religious Baptist family. He never joined any Church, and was a skeptic as a young man and sometimes ridiculed revivalists. He frequently referred to God and had a deep knowledge of the Bible, often quoting it. Lincoln attended Protestant church services with his wife and children. "Especially after the death of his young son Willie in 1862, Lincoln moved away from his earlier religious skepticism." Some argue that Lincoln was neither a Christian believer nor a secular freethinker.

Although Lincoln never made an unambiguous public profession of Christian belief, several people who knew him personally, such as Chaplain of the Senate Phineas Gurley and Mary Todd Lincoln, claimed that he believed in Christ in the religious sense. However, others who had known Lincoln for years, such as Ward Hill Lamon and William Herndon, rejected the idea that he was a believing Christian. During his 1846 run for the House of Representatives, in order to dispel accusations concerning his religious beliefs, Lincoln issued a handbill stating that he had "never denied the truth of the Scriptures". He seemed to believe in an all-powerful God, who shaped events and, by 1865, was expressing those beliefs in major speeches.

== Before presidency ==
Lincoln's parents were "Hard Shell" Baptists, joining the Little Pigeon Baptist Church near Lincoln City, Indiana, in 1823 when Abraham was 14 years old. Some writers have detected early Catholic influence on the young Lincoln which they attribute to his first school-teacher, Zachariah Riney.

In 1831, Lincoln moved to New Salem, which had no churches. Historian Mark Noll states that "Lincoln never joined a church nor ever made a clear profession of standard Christian belief." Noll quotes Lincoln's friend Jesse Fell:

that the president "seldom communicated to anyone his views" on religion, and he went on to suggest that those views were not orthodox: "on the innate depravity of man, the character and office of the great head of the Church, the Atonement, the infallibility of the written revelation, the performance of miracles, the nature and design of ... future rewards and punishments ... and many other subjects, he held opinions utterly at variance with what are usually taught in the church."

Noll argues that Lincoln was turned against organized Christianity by his experiences as a young man witnessing how excessive emotion and bitter sectarian quarrels marked yearly camp-meetings and the ministry of traveling preachers. As a young man, Lincoln enjoyed reading the works of Thomas Paine. He drafted a pamphlet incorporating such ideas, but did not publish it. After charges of hostility to Christianity almost cost him a congressional bid, he kept his unorthodox beliefs private. The one aspect of his parents' Calvinist religion that Lincoln apparently embraced wholeheartedly throughout his life was the "doctrine of necessity", also known as predestination, determinism, or fatalism. It was almost always through these lenses that Lincoln assessed the meaning of the Civil War.

James Adams (1783–1843) labeled Lincoln as a deist. It has been reported that in 1834 Lincoln wrote a manuscript essay challenging orthodox Christianity and modeled on Paine's book The Age of Reason. A friend supposedly burned the manuscript to protect Lincoln from ridicule. Biographer Rev. William Barton finds it likely that Lincoln had written an essay something of this character, but unlikely that it was burned in such a manner. New Salem schoolteacher Mentor Graham, with whom Lincoln boarded, reported in 1874 that the manuscript was "a defense of universal salvation".

William J. Herndon first published an account of the Paine-influenced manuscript in his 1889 biography of Lincoln. Harvey Lee Ross, mail carrier who lived in New Salem with Lincoln in 1834, regarded Herndon's account as a fictional story. He stated the following issues with the Herndon's account: Herndon was 16 years old in 1834 and lived 20 miles away in Springfield and did not have contact with Lincoln. There was no stove in Samuel Hill's store in 1834 where the manuscript was allegedly burned. There was not a copy of The Age of Reason on the bookshelf at the tavern where Herndon said Lincoln had read it. Finally, Ross stated he was very well acquainted with everyone in the community of New Salem and he would have known about any conversations regarding a document of this nature. It is a reasonable conclusion that there was never a manuscript written and Paine was not a contributing factor in Lincoln's ideas about religion.

William J. Johnson records a comment:

I remember well his argument. He took the passage, "As in Adam all die, even so in Christ shall all be made alive", and followed with the proposition that whatever the breach or injury of Adam's transgression to the human race was, which no doubt was very great, was made just and right by the atonement of Christ.

Noll writes, "At least early on, Lincoln was probably also a Universalist who believed in the eventual salvation of all people."

Lincoln was often perplexed by the attacks on his character by way of his religious choices. In a letter written to Martin M. Morris in 1843, Lincoln wrote:

There was the strangest combination of church influence against me. [Edward Dickinson] Baker is a Campbellite; and therefore, as I suppose with few exceptions, got all of that Church. My wife had some relations in the Presbyterian churches, and some in the Episcopal churches; and therefore, wherever it would tell, I was set down as either one or the other, while it was everywhere contended that no Christian ought to vote for me because I belonged to no Church, and was suspected of being a Deist and had talked of fighting a duel.

In 1846, when Lincoln ran for Congress against Peter Cartwright, the noted evangelist, Cartwright tried to make Lincoln's religion or lack of it a major issue of the campaign. Responding to accusations that he was an "infidel", Lincoln defended himself, publishing a hand-bill to "directly contradict" the charge made against him. The declaration was released as follows:

Handbill Replying to Charges of Infidelity

July 31, 1846

To the Voters of the Seventh Congressional District.

FELLOW CITIZENS:

A charge having got into circulation in some of the neighborhoods of this District, in substance that I am an open scoffer at Christianity, I have by the advice of some friends concluded to notice the subject in this form. That I am not a member of any Christian Church, is true; but I have never denied the truth of the Scriptures; and I have never spoken with intentional disrespect of religion in general, or of any denomination of Christians in particular. It is true that in early life I was inclined to believe in what I understand is called the "Doctrine of Necessity"—that is, that the human mind is impelled to action, or held in rest by some power, over which the mind itself has no control; and I have sometimes (with one, two or three, but never publicly) tried to maintain this opinion in argument. The habit of arguing thus however, I have, entirely left off for more than five years. And I add here, I have always understood this same opinion to be held by several of the Christian denominations. The foregoing, is the whole truth, briefly stated, in relation to myself, upon this subject.

I do not think I could myself, be brought to support a man for office, whom I knew to be an open enemy of, and scoffer at, religion. Leaving the higher matter of eternal consequences, between him and his Maker, I still do not think any man has the right thus to insult the feelings, and injure the morals, of the community in which he may live. If, then, I was guilty of such conduct, I should blame no man who should condemn me for it; but I do blame those, whoever they may be, who falsely put such a charge in circulation against me.

July 31, 1846. A. LINCOLN.

As Carl Sandburg recounts in Abraham Lincoln: The Prairie Years (1926), Lincoln attended one of Cartwright's revival meetings. At the conclusion of the service, the fiery pulpiteer called for all who intended to go to heaven to rise. Naturally, the response was heartening. Then, he called for all those who wished to go to hell to stand. Unsurprisingly there were not many takers. Lincoln had responded to neither option. Cartwright closed in. "Mr. Lincoln, you have not expressed an interest in going to either heaven or hell. May I enquire as to where you do plan to go?" Lincoln replied: "I did not come here with the idea of being singled out, but since you ask, I will reply with equal candor. I intend to go to Congress."

William Herndon, Lincoln's law partner, stated that Lincoln admired deists Thomas Paine and Voltaire. Herndon, an advocate of Darwin, said Lincoln thought the works of authors like Darwin and Spencer "entirely too heavy for an ordinary mind to digest" but he read and was "interested ... greatly" in a book expounding on these ideas, "Vestiges of Creation", and he was "deeply impressed with the notion of the so-called 'universal law' — evolution ... and he became a warm advocate of the new doctrine."

Lincoln believed in God, but some said he doubted the idea that Christ is God. In a written statement to Herndon, James W. Keyes said Lincoln

believed in a Creator of all things, who had neither beginning nor end, who possessing all power and wisdom, established a principal, in Obedience to which, Worlds move and are upheld, and animel and vegatable life came into existence. A reason he gave for his belief was, that in view of the Order and harmony of nature which all beheld, it would have been More miraculouis to have Come about by chance, than to have been created and arranged by some great thinking power.

Keyes also added that Lincoln once said

As to the christian theory, that, Christ is God, or equal to the Creator he said had better be taken for granted — for by the test of reason all might become infidels on that subject, for evidence of Christs divinity Came to us in somewhat doubtful Shape — but that the Sistom of Christianity was an ingenious one at least — and perhaps was Calculated to do good.

During his White House years, Lincoln and his family often attended the New York Avenue Presbyterian Church, where a plaque marks the family pew he rented.

== First Inaugural Address ==
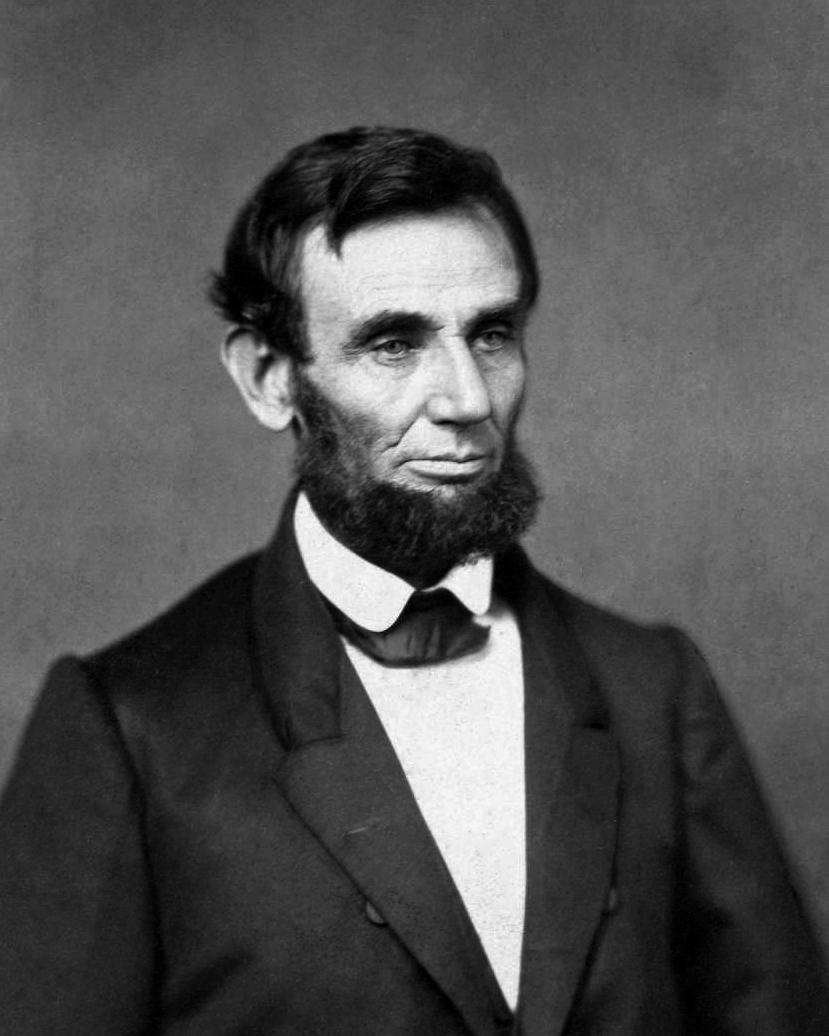
The first photographic image of Lincoln as president

On Monday, March 4, 1861, Lincoln delivered his first inaugural address, after the oath of office was administered by Chief Justice Roger Taney. Lincoln's speech addressed the national crisis of the southern secession from the union. Lincoln had hoped to resolve the conflict peacefully without a civil war. During the address, Lincoln stated, "Intelligence, patriotism, Christianity, and a firm reliance on Him who has never yet forsaken this favored land are still competent to adjust in the best way all our present difficulty."

== Civil War ==
In 1862 and 1863, during the most difficult days of the Civil War and his presidency, Lincoln's utterances were sometimes marked with spiritual overtones.

=== 1862: Bereavement and Emancipation ===
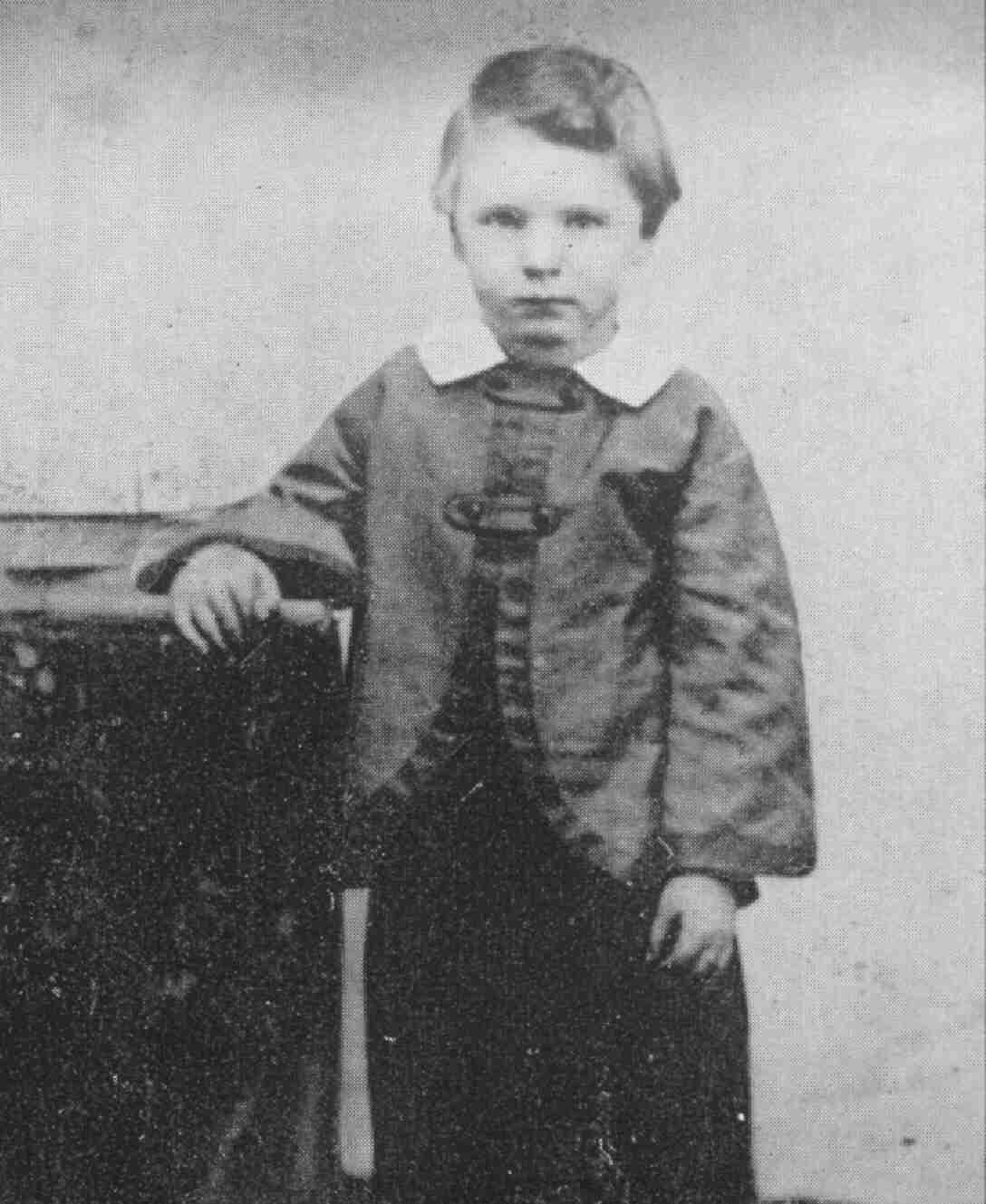
Willie Lincoln, who died in the White House during his father's presidency

On Thursday, February 20, 1862, at 5:00 p.m., Lincoln's eleven-year-old son, William Wallace Lincoln ("Willie"), died at the White House. Historians suggest that this may have been the most difficult personal crisis in Lincoln's life. After the funeral, he attempted a return to his routine but was unable. One week after the funeral, he isolated himself in his office and wept all day. Several people reported that Lincoln told them that his feelings about religion changed at this time. Willie is reported to have often remarked that he wanted to become a minister.

When his son died, Lincoln reportedly said, "May God live in all. He was too good for this earth. The good Lord has called him home. I know that he is much better off in Heaven."

Spiritualism, popularly in vogue during this era, was tried by Lincoln's wife. She used the services of mediums and spiritualists to try to contact their dead son. Lincoln allegedly attended at least one seance at the White House at this time with his wife.

When Bishop Matthew Simpson gave the address at Lincoln's funeral he quoted him asking a soldier "Do you ever find yourself talking with the dead? Since Willie's death, I catch myself every day, involuntarily talking with him as if he were with me."

At the same time, the war was not going well for the Union. General George McClellan's failure in the Peninsula Campaign came about within months after Willie's death. Next came Robert E. Lee's impressive victory at the Second Battle of Bull Run, after which he said, "I have been driven many times upon my knees by the overwhelming conviction that I had nowhere else to go."

According to Salmon Chase, as he was preparing to issue the preliminary Emancipation Proclamation, Lincoln said, "I made a solemn vow before God, that if General Lee was driven back from Maryland I would crown the result by the declaration of freedom to the slaves." The differences in interpretation of Lincoln's statement may be due to the belief that "swearing or vowing" to God was considered blasphemous by some religious organizations.

At the same time, Lincoln sat down in his office and penned the following words:

The will of God prevails. In great contests each party claims to act in accordance with the will of God. Both may be, and one must be, wrong. God cannot be for and against the same thing at the same time. In the present civil war it is quite possible that God's purpose is something different from the purpose of either party -- and yet the human instrumentalities, working just as they do, are of the best adaptation to effect His purpose. I am almost ready to say that this is probably true -- that God wills this contest, and wills that it shall not end yet. By his mere great power, on the minds of the now contestants, He could have either saved or destroyed the Union without a human contest. Yet the contest began. And, having begun He could give the final victory to either side any day. Yet the contest proceeds.

This concept continued to dominate Lincoln's public remarks for the rest of the war. The same theological allegory was to be prominent in Lincoln's Second Inaugural Address in March 1865:

Both [North and South] read the same Bible, and pray to the same God; and each invokes His aid against the other. It may seem strange that any men should dare to ask a just God's assistance in wringing their bread from the sweat of other men's faces; but let us judge not that we be not judged. The prayers of both could not be answered; that of neither has been answered fully. The Almighty has His own purposes.

=== 1863: Gettysburg ===
In late 1862 and early 1863 Lincoln would endure more agonies. The defeat of General Ambrose Burnside at Fredericksburg followed by the defeat of General Joseph Hooker at Chancellorsville sent Lincoln into a deep depression. "If there is a worse place than hell I am in it", Lincoln told Andrew Curtin in December 1862.

1863 was to be the year, however, in which the tide turned in favor of the Union. The Battle of Gettysburg in July 1863 was the first time that Lee was soundly defeated. Prompted by Sarah Josepha Hale, in the fall, Lincoln issued the first Federally mandated Thanksgiving Day to be kept on the last Thursday in November. Reflecting on the successes of the past year, Lincoln said,

No negro counsel hath devised nor hath any mortal hand worked out these great things. They are the gracious gifts of the Most High God, who, while dealing with us in anger for our sins, hath nevertheless remembered mercy. It has seemed to me fit and proper that they should be solemnly, reverently and gratefully acknowledged as with one heart and one voice by the whole American People. I do therefore invite my fellow citizens in every part of the United States, and also those who are at sea and those who are sojourning in foreign lands, to set apart and observe the last Thursday of November next, as a day of Thanksgiving and Praise to our beneficent Father who dwelleth in the Heavens.

In December 1863, Lincoln's Secretary of the Treasury decided on a new motto, "In God We Trust", to engrave on U.S. coins. Lincoln's involvement in this decision is unclear.

When a pious minister told Lincoln he "hoped the Lord is on our side", the president responded, "I am not at all concerned about that.... But it is my constant anxiety and prayer that I and this nation should be on the Lord's side."

In November 1863, Lincoln travelled to Gettysburg, Pennsylvania, to participate in the dedication of the cemetery established there for the thousands of soldiers who died during the recent battle. There he gave his celebrated speech, the Gettysburg Address, wherein he hoped that the nation shall, "under God", have a new birth of freedom. The words "under God" may not have been in his written manuscript, but it is posited by some sources that he added them extemporaneously from the podium.

According to scholars, he may have drawn the expression from George Washington's hagiographer, Parson Weems.

=== 1864 ===
In 1864, some former slaves in Maryland presented Lincoln with a gift of a Bible. According to one report, Lincoln replied:

In regard to this great book, I have but to say, it is the best gift God has given to man. All the good the Saviour gave to the world was communicated through this book. But for it we could not know right from wrong. All things most desirable for man's welfare, here and hereafter, are to be found portrayed in it.

In response to the reported speech in Maryland, Lincoln's law partner Herndon remarked "I am aware of the fraud committed on Mr. Lincoln in reporting some insane remarks supposed to have been made by him, in 1864, on the presentation of a Bible to him by the colored people of Baltimore. No sane man ever uttered such folly, and no sane man will ever believe it."

In September 1864, Lincoln, placing the Civil War squarely within a divine province, wrote in a letter to a member of the Society of Friends, "The purposes of the Almighty are perfect, and must prevail, though we erring mortals may fail accurately to perceive them in advance. We hoped for a happy termination of this terrible war long before this; but God knows best, and has ruled otherwise...we must work earnestly in the best light He gives us, trusting that so working still conduces to the great ends He ordains. Surely He intends some great good to follow this mighty convulsion, which no mortal could make, and no mortal could stay."

=== 1865 ===
On the day Lincoln was assassinated, he reportedly told his wife at Ford's Theatre that he wanted to visit the Holy Land and that "there was no place he so much desired to see as Jerusalem."

Following Lincoln's assassination a memory book, The Lincoln Memorial Album—Immortelles, in which people could write their thoughts includes some comments on Lincoln's religion. One entry, written by a well-known Presbyterian minister, the Rev. John H. Barrows, claimed that Lincoln had become a Christian in 1863 but provided no evidence. He said:

In the anxious uncertainties of the great war, he gradually rose to the heights where Jehovah became to him the sublimest of realities, the ruler of nations....When darkness gathered over the brave armies fighting for the nation's life, this strong man in the early morning knelt and wrestled in prayer with Him who holds the fate of empires. When the clouds lifted above the carnage of Gettysburg, he gave his heart to the Lord Jesus Christ.

The pastor of a church in Freeport, Illinois, in November 1864, said that a man from Illinois visited Lincoln in the White House and, after conducting other business, asked the president if he loved Jesus. The pastor said that Lincoln buried his face in his handkerchief as tears came to his eyes and then answered:

When I left home to take this chair of state, I requested my countrymen to pray for me. I was not then a Christian. When my son died, the severest trial of my life, I was not a Christian. But, when I went to Gettysburg and looked upon the graves of our dead heroes who had fallen in defense of their country, I then and there consecrated myself to Christ. Yes, I do love Jesus.

This quote appeared on page one of the Freeport Weekly Journal on December 7, 1864.

This has been portrayed to have been Lincoln's "reply" to this unnamed Illinois minister when asked if he loved Jesus. Some versions of this have Lincoln using the word "crosses" instead of "graves", and some have him saying "Christ" instead of "Jesus". William Eleazar Barton quotes this version in The Soul of Abraham Lincoln (1920), but further writes:

This incident must have appeared in print immediately after Lincoln's death, for I find it quoted in memorial addresses of May, 1865. Mr. Oldroyd has endeavored to learn for me in what paper he found it and on whose authority it rests, but without result. He does not remember where he found it. It is inherently improbable, and rests on no adequate testimony. It ought to be wholly disregarded. The earliest reference I have found to the story in which Lincoln is alleged to have said to an unnamed Illinois minister, "I do love Jesus" is in a sermon preached in the Baptist Church of Oshkosh, Wisconsin, April 19, 1865, by Rev. W.W. Whitcomb, which was published in the Oshkosh Northwestern, April 21, 1865, and in 1907 issued in pamphlet form by John E. Burton.

Allen C. Guelzo wrote that "Given that Lincoln never made any such profession publicly to anyone else, the account itself is dubious," though he added that Lincoln's wife is quoted as saying that "he felt religious More than Ever about the time he went to Gettysburg.”

== Posthumously ==
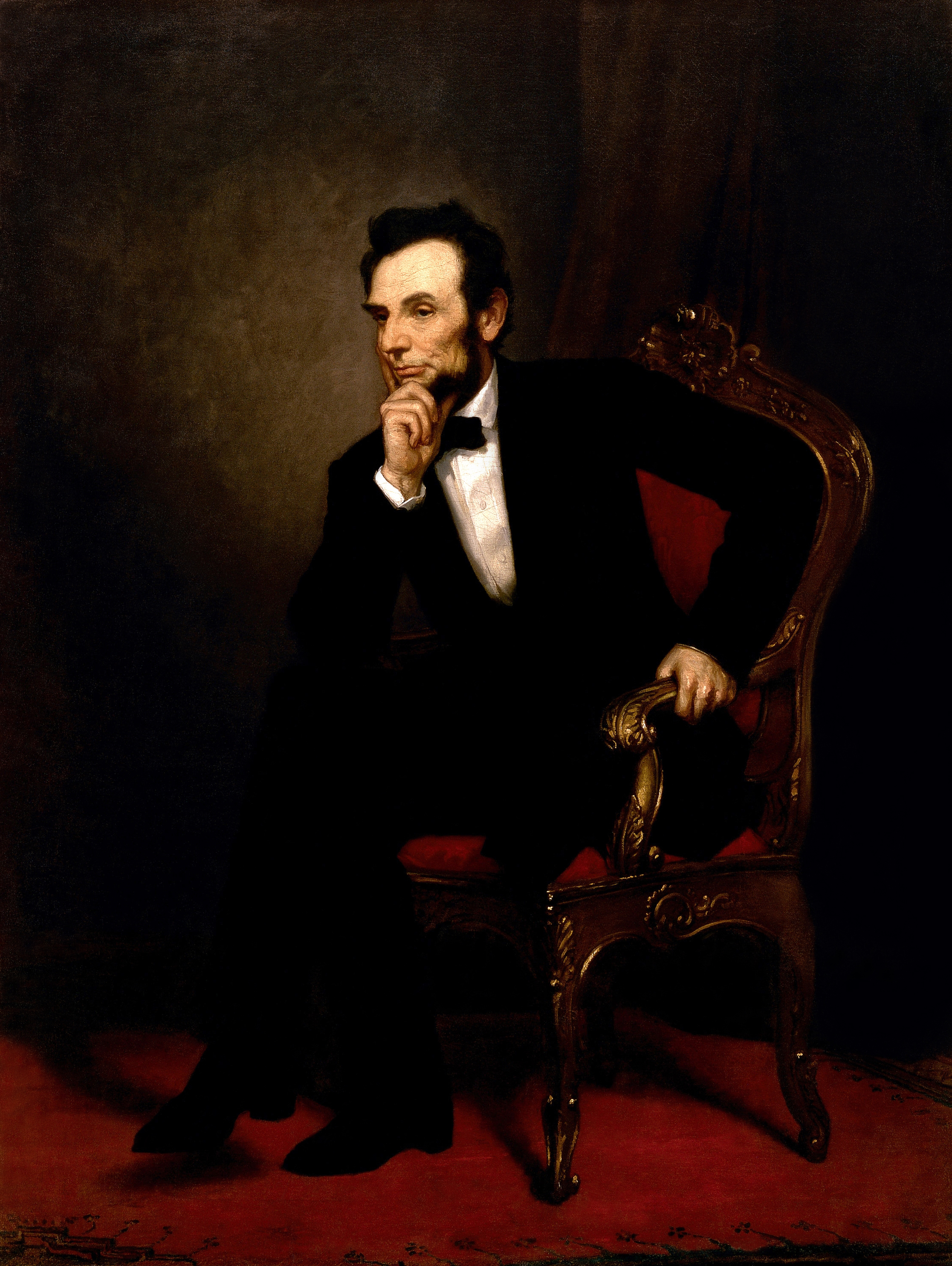
Lincoln, painting by George Peter Alexander Healy in 1869

Following Lincoln's assassination, there were competing biographies, some claiming Lincoln had been a Christian and others that he had been a non-believer. In 1872, Colonel Ward Hill Lamon published his Life of Abraham Lincoln; From his Birth to his Inauguration as President using interviews and correspondences collected by William Herndon, Lincoln's law partner in Springfield. Lamon had also been a law partner with Lincoln in Illinois, from 1852 until 1857, and later was Lincoln's personal bodyguard in Washington. Lamon's biography stated that Lincoln did not himself believe in the divinity of Jesus, and that several who knew him as a young man described him as an "infidel".

Mary Todd Lincoln strongly disagreed with the portrayal of her husband. She may have enlisted people such as Rev. Noyes W. Miner to testify to Lincoln's faith. Miner lived across the street from the Lincolns in Springfield, Illinois, and Lincoln was known to visit with Miner, a Baptist minister. Miner was also one of the ministers who officiated at the burial of Abraham Lincoln. Miner wrote, Lincoln "believed not only in the overwhelming Providence of God, but in the divinity of the Sacred Scriptures." Miner also related the story that on the night he was assassinated, Lincoln supposedly told Mary that he desired to visit the Holy Land.

Rev. James Armstrong Reed, in preparing his 1873 lectures on the religion of Lincoln, asked a number of people if there was any evidence of Lincoln being an "infidel" in his later life. The reply from Phineas Gurley, pastor of the same New York Avenue Presbyterian Church while Lincoln was an attender, to Reed's question was:

I do not believe a word of it. It could not have been true of him while here, for I have had frequent and intimate conversations with him on the subject of the Bible and the Christian religion, when he could have had no motive to deceive me, and I considered him sound not only on the truth of the Christian religion but on all its fundamental doctrines and teaching. And more than that: in the latter days of his chastened and weary life, after the death of his son Willie, and his visit to the battle-field of Gettysburg, he said, with tears in his eyes, that he had lost confidence in everything but God, and that he now believed his heart was changed, and that he loved the Saviour, and, if he was not deceived in himself, it was his intention soon to make a profession of religion.

Noah Brooks, a newspaperman, and a friend and biographer of Lincoln's, in reply to Reed's inquiry if there was any truth to claims that Lincoln was an "infidel", stated:

In addition to what has appeared from my pen, I will state that I have had many conversations with Mr. Lincoln, which were more or less of a religious character, and while I never tried to draw anything like a statement of his views from him, yet he freely expressed himself to me as having 'a hope of blessed immortality through Jesus Christ.' His views seemed to settle so naturally around that statement, that I considered no other necessary. His language seemed not that of an inquirer, but of one who had a prior settled belief in the fundamental doctrines of the Christian religion. Once or twice, speaking to me of the change which had come upon him, he said, while he could not fix any definite time, yet it was after he came here, and I am very positive that in his own mind he identified it with about the time of Willie's death. He said, too, that after he went to the White House he kept up the habit of daily prayer. Sometimes he said it was only ten words, but those ten words he had. There is no possible reason to suppose that Mr. Lincoln would ever deceive me as to his religious sentiments. In many conversations with him, I absorbed the firm conviction that Mr. Lincoln was at heart a Christian man, believed in the Savior, and was seriously considering the step which would formally connect him with the visible church on earth. Certainly, any suggestion as to Mr. Lincoln's skepticism or Infidelity, to me who knew him intimately from 1862 till the time of his death, is a monstrous fiction -- a shocking perversion.

According to an affidavit signed under oath in Essex County, New Jersey, February 15, 1928, by Mrs. Sidney I. Lauck, then a very old woman: "After Mr. Lincoln's death, Dr. Gurley told me that Mr. Lincoln had made all the necessary arrangements with him and the Session of the New York Avenue Presbyterian Church to be received into the membership of the said church, by confession of his faith in Christ, on the Easter Sunday following the Friday night when Mr. Lincoln was assassinated." Mrs. Lauck was, she said, about thirty years of age at the time of the assassination. While this is possible, Dr. Gurley did not mention anything about Lincoln's impending membership at the funeral in the White House, in which he delivered the sermon that has been preserved, nor in his reply to Reed (above).

Francis Bicknell Carpenter, the author of Six Months in the White House, told Reed that he "believed Mr. Lincoln to be a sincere Christian" and reported that Lincoln had told a woman from Brooklyn in the United States Christian Commission that he had had "a change of heart" and intended "at some suitable opportunity to make a profession of religion".

Rev. Madison Clinton Peters, in his 1909 biography wrote, "That he was a true and sincere Christian, in fact, if not in form, is fully proved by many extracts from his letters and public utterances."

Quotations attributed to Mrs. Lincoln seem inconsistent. She wrote to Reverend Smith, the pastor in Springfield: "When too - the overwhelming sorrow came upon us, our beautiful bright angelic boy, Willie was called away from us, to his Heavenly Home, with God's chastising hand upon us - he turned his heart to Christ."

But Ward Lamon claimed that Mary Lincoln said to William Herndon: "Mr. Lincoln had no hope and no faith in the usual acceptance of these words" and Herndon claimed she told him that "Mr. Lincoln's maxim and philosophy were, 'What is to be, will be, and no prayers of ours can arrest the decree.' He never joined any church. He was a religious man always, I think, but was not a technical Christian."

However, Mary Lincoln utterly denied these quotes, insisting that Herndon had "put those words in her mouth." She wrote,

With very great sorrow & natural indignation have I read of Mr Herndon, placing words in my mouth--never once uttered. I remember the call he made on me for a few minutes at the [St. Nicholas] hotel as he mentions, your welcome entrance a quarter of an hour afterward, naturally prevented a further interview with him. Mr Herndon, had always been an utter stranger to me, he was not considered an habitué, at our house.

Herndon's reply to these accusations was never answered.

John Remsburg (1848–1919), President of the American Secular Union in 1897, argued against claims of Lincoln's conversion in his book Six Historic Americans (1906). He cites several of Lincoln's close associates:

- The man who stood nearest to President Lincoln at Washington—nearer than any clergyman or newspaper correspondent—was his private secretary, Col. John G. Nicolay. In a letter dated May 27, 1865, Colonel Nicolay says: "Mr. Lincoln did not, to my knowledge, in any way change his religious ideas, opinions, or beliefs from the time he left Springfield to the day of his death."
- His lifelong friend and executor, Judge David Davis, affirmed the same: "He had no faith in the Christian sense of the term."
- His biographer, Colonel Lamon, intimately acquainted with him in Illinois, and with him during all the years that he lived in Washington, says: "Never in all that time did he let fall from his lips or his pen an expression which remotely implied the slightest faith in Jesus as the son of God and the Savior of men." Both Lamon and Herndon published biographies of their former colleague after his assassination relating their personal recollections of him. Each denied Lincoln's adherence to Christianity and characterized his religious beliefs as deist or skeptical.

In a letter held by The Raab Collection dated February 4, 1866, William Herndon wrote that:

Mr. Lincoln's religion is too well known to me to allow of even a shadow of a doubt; he is or was a Theist & a Rationalist, denying all extraordinary - supernatural inspiration or revelation. At one time in his life, he was an elevated Pantheist, doubting the immortality of the soul as the Christian world understands that term. He believed that the soul lost its identity and was immortal as a force. Subsequent to this he rose to the belief of a God, and this is all the change he ever underwent. I speak knowing what I say. He was a noble man- a good great man for all this. My own ideas of God- his attributes - man, his destiny, & the relations of the two, are tinged with Mr. Lincoln's religion. I cannot, for the poor life of me, see why men dodge the sacred truth of things. In my poor lectures I stick to the truth and bide my time. I love Mr. Lincoln dearly, almost worship him, but that can't blind me. He's the purest politician I ever saw, and the justest man. I am scribbling- that's the word- away on a life of Mr. Lincoln- gathering known- authentic & true facts of him. Excuse the liberties I have taken with you- hope you won't have a fight with Johnson. Is he turning out a fool - a Tyler? He must go with God if he wants to be a living and vital power.

== Modern views ==
In Lincoln: A Life of Purpose and Power (2006), Richard Carwardine of Oxford University highlights Lincoln's considerable ability to rally evangelical Northern Protestants to the flag by nourishing the millennial belief that they were God's chosen people. A reviewer of Carwardine's book notes: "This was no mean feat, coming from a man who had been suspected of agnosticism or atheism for most of his life. Yet by the end, while still a religious skeptic, Lincoln, too, seemed to equate the preservation of the Union and the freeing of the slaves with some higher, mystical purpose."

In Abraham Lincoln: Redeemer President, historian Allen C. Guelzo argues that Lincoln's boyhood inculcation of Calvinism was the dominant thread running through his adult life. He characterizes Lincoln's worldview as a kind of "Calvinized deism."

A Bible that belonged to President Abraham Lincoln resurfaced 150 years after his death. The Bible was gifted to President Lincoln by the Citizens Volunteer Hospital of Philadelphia on June 16, 1864. It was then passed on to his neighbor Rev. Noyes W. Miner by the first lady Mary Lincoln on October 15, 1872. Miner's family has passed the keepsake down from generation to generation and donated the Bible for the public to see. Another Bible owned by Lincoln was used by former presidents Obama and Trump at their inaugurations.
