= John Henry Barrows =

American clergyman

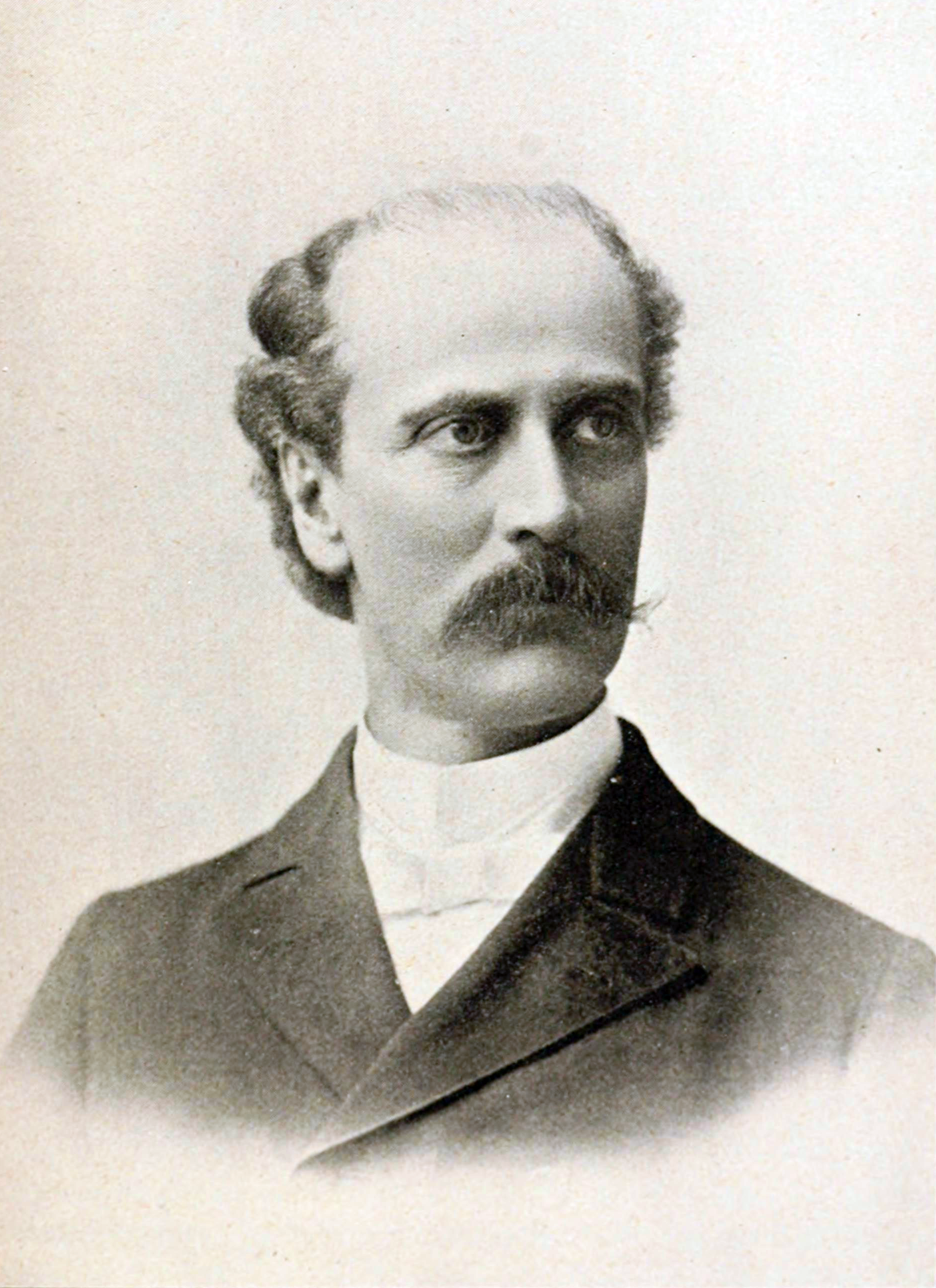

5th President of Oberlin College
- In office 1899 – June 3, 1902
- Preceded by: William Gay Ballantine
- Succeeded by: Henry Churchill King

Chairman of the General Committee of the World Parliament of Religions
- In office September 11–27, 1893
- Preceded by: Started*
- Succeeded by: Ended*

Personal details
- Born: July 1, 1847 Medina Township, Michigan
- Died: June 3, 1902 (aged 54) Oberlin, Ohio
- Spouse: Sarah Eleanor
- Education: Olivet College (B.A., 1867); Yale Divinity School (1867–1868); Union Theological Seminary (1868–1869); Andover Theological Seminary (1875)
- Profession: Clergyman, author

John Henry Barrows (1847–1902) was an American clergyman of First Presbyterian Church (Chicago) and Chairman of the 1893 General Committee on the Congress of Religions (later to be known as the World's Parliament of Religions). He claimed that Abraham Lincoln had become a Christian in 1863.

Barrows is best known for organizing and leading World's Parliament of Religions in Chicago by bringing together renowned persons of different religious backgrounds from all over the world to increase interest in the studies of religions, clarify the misconceptions about varying religious traditions, and seemingly to show the supremacy of one religion over another. He is more credited for introducing a new concept of "tolerance" and "understanding" between all nations and religions through Parliament of Religions for Americans.

He authored several books and notably two volumes of The World's Parliament of Religions: An Illustrated and Popular Story of the World's First Parliament of Religions, Held in Chicago in Connection with the Columbian Exposition of 1893. An endowed chair at the University of Chicago Divinity School is named after him.

== Biography ==
=== Early life and education ===
Barrows was born in Medina Township, Michigan on July 11, 1847, to John Manning and Catherine Moore Barrows.

He received his Bachelor of Arts degree from Olivet College in 1867. He received his theological training from Yale Divinity School and Union Theological Seminary during 1867–1868 and 1868–1869 respectively. He became a member of Plymouth Church of the Pilgrims and was a student of pulpit oratory of Henry Ward Beecher, while at Union Theological Seminary.

For two and a half years, he did missionary and educational work in Kansas and preached for a year in the First Congregational Church – Springfield. He preached domestically and abroad for a while and graduated later from Andover Theological Seminary in 1875. He was then ordained to the Congregational ministry in 1875.

=== Marriage and family ===
Barrows married Sarah Eleanor; together they had three daughters and a son.

He held pastorates from 1875 to 1881 at the Eliot Congregational Church in Lawrence, Massachusetts and Maverick Congregational Church of East Boston.

=== First Presbyterian Church pastor ===
In 1881, he became the pastor of the First Presbyterian Church, which he held for fourteen years. During his stint as sixth pastor of Presbyterian Church, he became one of the most famous preachers of his time. He conducted Sunday evening service and spoke at temperance and missionary meetings. He was also a favorite speaker before gatherings at Chautauqua, New York and served on the advisory council of the Chautauquan System.

He went to India and the Orient – Japan and Honolulu – to give the Haskel Lecture through the Haskell Foundation (endowed by Caroline E. Haskell) in 1896 for the University of Chicago, which he continued lecturing for next two years. Barrows served as minister of the First Presbyterian Church in Chicago between 1886 and 1891.

=== Oberlin College president ===
Barrows was elected as the president of Oberlin College in 1899, and under him the institution was said to be prospered greatly. He died in office on June 3, 1902, at 55.

== Congress of Religions ==
The World's Parliament of Religions was held in Chicago, Illinois, on the shore of Lake Michigan in 1893. Representatives of Protestantism, Hinduism, Jainism, Islam, Judaism, Catholicism, Greek and Russian Orthodoxy, Confucianism, Taoism, Shintoism, Ethical Culture, and others, met with objectives as mentioned in the 1891 Preliminary Address, including:

- To bring together representatives of religions from all around the world.
- To bring forth the truths the various religions teach in common.
- To promote the brotherhood among the religious men of diverse faith.

Charles Carroll Bonney, the president of the World's Congress Auxiliary and a layman in the Swedenborgian church, initiated the process of organizing the Parliament of Religions by appointing John Henry Barrows as chairman to administer the General Committee on World's Parliament of Religions. Under his leadership in June 1891, invitation copies in the thousands were sent to religious leaders around the world, reporting the plan for the Parliament of Religions scheduled to be held in 1893. However, the Presbyterian Church in the United States of America, the home church of Barrows, the then Sultan of Turkey, the European Roman Catholic hierarchy, the Archbishop of Canterbury, and many prominent evangelical leaders of North America such as Dwight L. Moody bitterly opposed the convention. Though there was no unanimous approval for the convention from Presbyterians, intense disapproval was worded in the letter of the Archbishop of Canterbury saying that "... the Christian religion is the one religion. I do not understand how that religion can be regarded as a member of a Parliament of Religions without assuming the equality of the other intended members and the parity of their position and claims." Though Max Müller, an Orientalist and Philologist, failed to attend the convention, yet he hoped the Parliament of Religions would increase the interest in the study of religions.

Despite varied encouragement and opposition, Parliament of Religions began on 11 September 1893. More than 4000 people gathered in the "Hall of Columbus," dominated predominantly by English-speaking Christian speakers along with limited representatives from other religious faiths – 12 speakers represented Buddhism; 11 speakers represented Judaism; 8 from Hinduism; 2 each from Islam, Parsi, Confucianism, and Shintoism; and 1 each from Taoism and Jainism. The convention continued for seventeen days with a variety of topics presented by a variety of speakers from various faiths and traditions. Most of the 17-day sessions were chaired and presided over by Barrows himself; Most of the times, he also performed the customary act of "silent prayer" and said the "Universal Prayer."

=== Observations ===
Religion formed the essence of the convention in pushing aside the importance of culture and ethnicity. In the words of John P. Burris, "religion was perceived as the center of any given society and the most obvious aspect of culture through which the essence of a given people's cultural orientation might be understood." Hence, the decision to select the suitable religions to be part of the "Ten Great World Religions" through inclusion or exclusion pushed aside culture and ethnic contexts. Due to this, the Parliament included only converted African Americans by excluding Native Americans altogether.

The official objectives of the Parliament seem to have avoided an attitude of supremacy of one religion over another in the '1891 Preliminary Address'; nonetheless, much emphasis was laid in bringing forth the commonalities among the worldwide religions and thereby building "human brotherhood." In no case were there either attempts or aims for devising a "Universal Religion" or unity. It seems that the Parliament was able to introduce the importance of the comparative study of religions in order to maintain "mutual good understanding" among the various religious traditions as hoped by Max Müller.

According to Donald H. Bishop, there were three common attitudes towards other religions in the Parliament, namely, 'inclusivism', 'exclusivism', and 'pluralism'. To highlight these, Donald H. Bishop took illustrations from the speeches and views expressed by speakers in the convention; these are captured in both volumes of The World's Parliament of Religions: An Illustrated and Popular Story of the World's First Parliament of Religions, Held in Chicago in Connection with the Columbian Exposition of 1893, authored by Barrows.

- exclusivism: Bishop observes that exclusivist attitudes were either offensive or amicable in type. For this, he took the presentation made by William C. Wilkinson as an example:

Men need to be saved from false religion; they are in no way capable of being saved by false religion. Such, at least, is the teaching of Christianity. The attitude, therefore, of Christianity towards religions other than itself is an attitude of universal, absolute, eternal, unappeasable hostility ... (in Barrows 1893b, 1249)

- inclusivism: Donald H. Bishop defines inclusivism as an attitude towards other religions based on an underlying assumption that one's religion is superior to others, but this assumption is expressed through openness towards other religions. He means to say that the beliefs of other religions could be possibly included or subordinated to the terms defined by inclusivists with no effect on their own religious superiority. Once other religious beliefs become subordinated, they are longer 'threatening' to the superior religion and its beliefs.
- pluralism: Bishop observes that pluralism was expressed in the Parliament's emphasizing more the peaceful coexistence of religions by rejecting any claim to supremacy of one over other religion. He referred to Charles Carroll Bonney's opening speech to express the pluralistic attitude of the Parliament:

As the finite can never fully comprehend the infinite, nor perfectly express its own view of the divine, it necessarily follows that individual opinions of the divine nature and attributes will differ. But, properly understood, these varieties of view are not causes of discord and strife, but rather incentives to deeper interest and examination. Necessarily God reveals himself differently to a child than to a man; to a philosopher than to one who cannot read. Each must see God with the eyes of his own soul. Each must behold him through the colored glasses of his own nature. Each one must receive him according to his own capacity of reception. (Barrows 1893a, 68)

As reported in the article "World Parliament of Religions" (1893), the attitude towards plurality was evident in the invitations sent to all religious representatives worldwide:

We affectionately invite the representatives of all faiths to aid us in presenting to the world, at the Exposition of 1893, the religious harmonies and unities of humanity, and also in showing forth the moral and spiritual agencies which are at the root of human progress.

In words of Barrows, " 'human progress' would objectively reach its culmination through Christianity. As the apex of all religions, Christianity can influence other religions meaningfully, but not vice versa."

The Parliament has shown that Christianity is still the great quickener of humanity, that it is now educating those who do not accept its doctrines, that there is no teacher to be compared with Christ, and no Saviour excepting Christ ... The non-Christian world may give us valuable criticism and confirm scriptural truths and make excellent suggestion as to Christian improvement, but it has nothing to add to the Christian creed” (1893b, 1581; italics mine).

Apparently, Barrows' aim for the World's Parliament of Religions's convention was to appreciate and welcome other religions and their beliefs with open heart, but subordinate them to the finality of Christianity. However, this seems, to have been threatened by the "Universal Religion and Universal religious truth," said to have been proposed by Swami Vivekananda.

As reported in the article, John H. Barrows continued with a Christian version of the Darwinian – survival of the fittest, which he also mentioned in his writings:

The best religion must come to the front, and the best religion will ultimately survive, because it will contain all that is true in all the faiths.

The efforts of Barrows and World's Parliament of Religions has visibly left significant legacies for America and its people. In the words of Joseph Kitagawa, "A strong stimulus for the wide acceptance of the study of comparative religion" in America emerged in academic life. While Marcus Braybrooke, President of the World Congress of Faiths, said that "other religions and faiths introduced to Americans other than Christianity has raised the awareness about 'religious plurality' among Americans." Diana L. Eck also sees the first World's Parliament of Religions as one of the first events of the ecumenical movement. It seems to have influenced Christian missionaries abroad and also religious figures from East – Swami Vivekanada, Anagarika Dharmapala, Protap Chunder Mozoomdar, and Soyen Shaku -, towards an appreciation of other religious traditions.

=== Some excerpts ===
A letter preserves a speech of Anagarika Dharmapala, who was a Buddhist delegate from Ceylon – then a British colony. He was invited to represent "Southern Buddhism." A few excerpts from that speech:

FRIENDS,— I bring to you the good wishes of four hundred and seventy-five millions of Buddhists, the blessings and peace of the religious founder of that system which has prevailed so many centuries in Asia, which has made Asia mild, and which is to-day, in its twenty-fourth century of existence, the prevailing religion of those countries. I have sacrificed the greatest of all work to attend this Parliament; I have left the work of consolidating the different Buddhist countries, which is the most important work in the history of modern Buddhism. When I read the program of this Parliament of Religions I saw it was simply the re-echo of a great consummation which the Indian Buddhists accomplished twenty-four centuries ago.

At that time Asoka, the great emperor, held a council, in the city of Patna, of a thousand scholars, which was in session for seven months. The proceedings were epitomized and carved on rock and scattered all over the Indian peninsula and the then known globe. After the consummation of that program the great Emperor sent the gentle teachers, the mild disciples of Buddha, in the garb that you see on this platform, to instruct the world. In that plain garb they went across the deep rivers, across the Himalayas, to the plains of Mongolia and of China and to the far-off beautiful isles, the Empire of the Rising Sun; and the influence of that congress, held twenty-one centuries ago, is to-day a living power, for you everywhere see mildness in Asia.

Then I wrote to Dr. Barrows that this would be the proudest occasion of modern history and the crowning work of nineteen centuries. Yes, friends, if you are serious, if you are unselfish, if you are altruistic, this program can be carried out and the twentieth century will see the teachings of the meek and lowly Jesus accomplished.

I hope in this great city, the youngest of all cities, this program will be carried out, and that the name of Dr. Barrows will shine forth as the American Asoka. And I hope that the noble lessons of tolerance learned in this majestic assembly will result in the dawning of universal peace which will last for twenty centuries more.

Barrows had advertised in the Chinese newspapers proposing a premium in gold for the best essays on Confucianism and Taoism. This drew 42 Chinese scholars to enter the competition. The selected Chinese essay was translated into English and read on the fifth day, Friday, September 15, 1893. A Chinese by the name of 'Kung Hsien Ho' of Shanghai won the first prize.

Barrows, in the absence of representation of the Hindu creed, ensured a unique audience there after he had won the confidence of India's representatives as their host at Chicago. Being desirous to write on Hinduism, he wrote a letter to more than 100 prominent Hindu's requesting each to explicate some of the leading tenets of Hinduism according to their views. He received just one reply:

Pantheism, Maya – Delusion or the Unreality of the phenomena of Sense and Consciousness, and Transmigration may be called Hindu doctrines.

A letter was sent by 'S. Horiuchi', a Japanese and Secretary of the Society for the Restoration of Buddhist Holy Places in India:

To THE REV. JOHN HENRY BARROWS, D.D.— Dear Sir: I do not believe it totally uninteresting to give here a short account of our Indo Busseki Kofuku Society of Japan.

The object of this society is to restore and reestablish the holy places of Buddhism in India, and to send out a certain number of Japanese priests to perform devotional exercises in each of them, and promote the convenience of pilgrims from Japan. These holy places are Buddha Gaya, where Buddha attained to the perfect enlightenment; Kapilavastu, where Buddha was born; the Deer Park, where Buddha first preached, and Kusinagara, where Buddha entered Nirvana.

Two thousand nine hundred and twenty years ago — that is, 1,026 years before Christ — the world-honored Prince Siddhartha was born in the palace of his father, King Suddhodana, in Kapilavastu, the capital of the Kingdom Magadha. When he was 19 years old he began to lament men's inevitable subjection to the various sufferings of sickness, old age, and death; and, discarding all his precious possessions and the heirship to the kingdom, he went into a mountain jungle to seek by meditation and asceticism the way of escape from these sufferings. After spending six years there, and finding that the way he seeks after was not in asceticism, he went out from there and retired under the Bodhi tree of Buddha Gaya, where at last, by profound meditation, he attained the supreme wisdom and became Buddha.

The light of truth and mercy began to shine from him over the whole world, and the way of perfect emancipation was open for all human beings, so that every one can bathe in his blessings and walk in the way of enlightenment. When the ancient King Asoka, of Magadha, was converted to Buddhism he erected a large and magnificent temple over the spot to show his gratitude to the founder of his new religion. But, sad to say, the fierce Mohammedans invaded and laid waste the country, there being no Buddhist to guard the temple, which possession fell into the hands of a Brahminist priest, who chanced to come here and seize it.

It was early in the spring of 1891 that the Japanese priest, the Rev. Shaku Kionen, in company with Mr. H. Dharmapala, of Ceylon, visited this holy ground. The great Buddha Gaya Temple was carefully repaired and restored to its former state by the British Government; but they could not help being very much grieved to see it subjected to much desecration in the hands of the Brahminist Mahant, and communicated to us their earnest desire to rescue it. With warm sympathy for them, and thinking, as Sir Edwin Arnold said, that it is not right for Buddhists to leave the guardianship of the holy center of Buddhist Religion of Grace to the hand of a Brahminist priest, we organized this Indo Busseki Kofuku Society in Japan to accomplish the object before mentioned in cooperation with the Maha-Bodhi Society, organized by H. Dharmapala and other brothers in India. These are the outlines of the origin and object of our Indo Busseki Kofuku Society, and I believe our Buddha Gaya movement will bring people of all Buddhist countries into closer connection and be instrumental in promoting the brotherhood among the people of the whole world.

=== Silent debate with Swami Vivekananda ===
Barrows invited Hindu monk Swami Vivekananda to make some remarks during the Parliament of Religion sessions; Vivekananda responded with a short fable to illustrate the variety of men of different races and religions, just before the close of the afternoon session on the fifth day, Friday, 15 September 1893.

A frog lived in a well. It had lived there for a long time. It was born there and brought up there, and yet was a little, small frog. Of course the evolutionists were not there then to tell us whether the frog lost its eyes or not; but, for our story's sake, we must take it for granted that it had its eyes, and that it every day cleansed the water of all the worms and bacilli that lived in it, with an energy that would give credit to our modern bacteriologists. In this way it went on and became a little sleek and fat — perhaps as much so as myself.

Well, one day another frog that lived in the sea, came and fell into the well.
"Whence are you from ?."
"I'm from the sea."
"The sea? How big is that? Is it as big as my well?" and he took a leap from one side of the well to the other.
"My friend," says the frog of the sea,"how do you compare the sea with your little well?" Then the frog took another leap, and asked : "Is your sea so big?"
"What nonsense you speak, to compare the sea with your well! "
"Well, then," said the frog of the well," nothing can be bigger than my well; there can be nothing bigger than this; this fellow is a liar, so turn him out."

That has been the difficulty all the while.

As reported in Rediff.com, the Chicago Tribune listed Swami Vivekananda as being introduced in the afternoon session after a lunch recess; A news report titled "Common Cause" on the same day appeared in the Chicago Tribune and described the attire of Swami Vivekananda as a "single violent orange garment". The article written by 'Wesley Wildman' titled "World Parliament of Religions (1893)" states that Vivekananda's three speeches drew the most attention from the American public. It also states that Barrows recorded in his works that when Vivekananda addressed the audience as "Sisters and Brothers of America," he drew wide applause which lasted for several minutes.

Another article mentions about Barrows' comments on Vivekananda's influence in Parliament:

Dr. J.H. Barrows, Chairman of the General Committee of the Parliament of Religions, said: 'Swami Vivekananda exercised a wonderful influence over his auditors,' and Mr. Merwin-Marie Snell stated, more enthusiastically: 'By far the most important and typical representative of Hinduism was Swami Vivekananda, who, in fact, was beyond question the most popular and influential man in the Parliament....He was received with greater enthusiasm than any other speaker, Christian or pagan. The people thronged about him wherever he went and hung with eagerness on his every word. The most rigid of orthodox Christians say of him, "He is indeed a prince among men!"'

"World Parliament of Religions" (1893), written by Wesley Wildman, states that Barrows mentioned in his works Vivekananda's belief that "every religion is only an evolving of God out of the material man; and the same God is the inspirer of all of them." The article also states:

Contradictions among religions for him were only apparent and came from the same truth "adapting itself to the different circumstances of different natures" (977). Vivekananda's ultimate goal was undoubtedly represented in his proposal of a "universal religion."

The article also mentions the interpretation of "Universal Religion" as:

What Vivekananda meant by the "universal religion" was not that all religious traditions would disappear and replaced by a new and single religion. Rather, it would be an authentic togetherness of all religions, in which "each must assimilate the others and yet preserve its individuality and grow according to its law of growth" (in Barrows 1893a, 170). The necessity to "assimilate the others" was expressed by Vivekananda as the avoidance of the triumph of any one of the religions over others. He stated, "Do I wish that the Christian would become Hindu? God forbid. Do I wish that the Hindu or Buddhist would become Christian? God forbid" (in Barrows 1893a, 170).

Barrows, in his "Review and Summary" of the Parliament, seemed to attack Vivekananda's idea of "Universal Religion," having perceived it as a 'threat' to Christian supremacy. It seems, Barrows expressed his concerns:

- The idea of evolving a cosmic or universal faith out of the Parliament was not present in the minds of its chief promoters.
- They believe that the elements of such a religion are already contained in the Christian ideal and the Christian Scripture.
- They had no thought of attempting to formulate a universal creed. (Barrows 1893b, 1572)

Eventually, Barrows supported the Christian version of Darwinian – "survival of the fittest," saying, as mentioned above:

The best religion must come to the front, and the best religion will ultimately survive, because it will contain all that is true in all the faiths.

There is also a quotation in an article about Barrows, in his History of the Parliament of Religions:

Since faith in a Divine Power to whom men believe they owe service and worship, has been like the sun, a life-giving and fructifying potency in man's intellectual and moral development; since Religion lies at the back of Hindu literature with its marvellous and mystic developments; of the European Art, whether in the form of Grecian statues or Gothic cathedrals; and of American liberty and the recent uprisings of men on behalf of a juster social condition; and since it is as clear as the light, that the Religion of Christ has led to many of the chief and noblest developments of our modern civilization, it did not appear that Religion any more than Education, Art, or Electricity, should be excluded from the Columbian Exposition.

There are some interesting and contradicting facts about Swami Vivekananda's belief in Spirituality and Vegetarianism. As reported in an article written by 'Shashi Shekar' for Rediff.com, the author found some article clippings that appeared in The New York Times wherein Vivekananda debunked spirituality and vegetarianism, apparently during an event in New York City in May 1894, while speaking on vegetarianism to an audience.

There is another article from The Outlook; then, Vivekananda preferred "beef" as his food with Barrows. The article seems to have appeared on July 17, 1897:

Dr. Barrows says: "After the first session of the Parliament of Religions I went with Vivekananda to the restaurant in the basement of the Art Institute, and I said to him, 'What shall I get you to eat?' His reply was "Give me beef !""

There is also a contradictory report about Vivekananda's master Ramakrishna aka Ramakrishna Paramahansa, a mystic, for having learned or known Sanskrit as a language. There is a second-hand story in The Outlook magazine, re-published in several articles. According to the reports, Barrows had learned an interesting story from Max Muller, professor at Oxford University about Sanskrit, where Max Muller had asked Swami Vivekananda if his master, Ramakrishna, knew Sanskrit.

The answer at first was evasive, but Vivekananda finally said "When Ramakrishna was in the jungle as an ascetic, a beautiful woman came down from heaven and taught him the language." "Nonsense" was Max Muller's reply; "The only way to learn Sanskrit is to get a grammar and a dictionary and go to work."

== Abraham Lincoln had become a Christian claim ==
Barrows claimed that Abraham Lincoln had become a Christian without providing any evidence. In the Lincoln Memorial Album, following Lincoln's assassination, Barrows wrote a few comments about Lincoln's religion:

In the anxious uncertainties of the great war, he gradually rose to the heights where Jehovah became to him the sublimest of realities, the ruler of nations. When he wrote his immortal Proclamation, he invoked upon it not only 'the considerate judgment of mankind,' but 'the gracious favor of Almighty God.' When darkness gathered over the brave armies fighting for the nation's life, this strong man in the early morning knelt and wrestled in prayer with him who holds in his hand the fate of empires. When the clouds lifted above the carnage of Gettysburg, he gave his heart to the Lord Jesus Christ. When he pronounced his matchless oration on the chief battlefield of the war, he gave expression to the resolve that 'this nation, under God, should have a new birth of freedom.' And when he wrote his last Inaugural Address, he gave to it the lofty religious tone of an old Hebrew psalm.

== Bibliography ==
- Seven Lectures on the Credibility of the Gospel Histories – 1891
- The World's Parliament of Religions: An Illustrated and Popular Story of the World's First Parliament of Religions, Held in Chicago in Connection with the Columbian Exposition of 1893. Vol. I
- The World's Parliament of Religions: An Illustrated and Popular Story of the World's First Parliament of Religions, Held in Chicago in Connection with the Columbian Exposition of 1893. Vol. II
- Henry Ward Beecher, the Shakespeare of the Pulpit – 1893
- A World Pilgrimage – 1897
- Christianity, the World Religion – 1897
- The Christian Conquest of Asia – 1899
- Spiritual Forces in American History – 1889
- Christianity the World-Religion: Lectures Delivered in India and Japan
- I Believe in God the Father Almighty
- The Nation and the Soldier. a Memorial Address
- A World-Pilgrimage

== See also ==
- Abraham Lincoln and religion
