= Callie Bonney Marble =

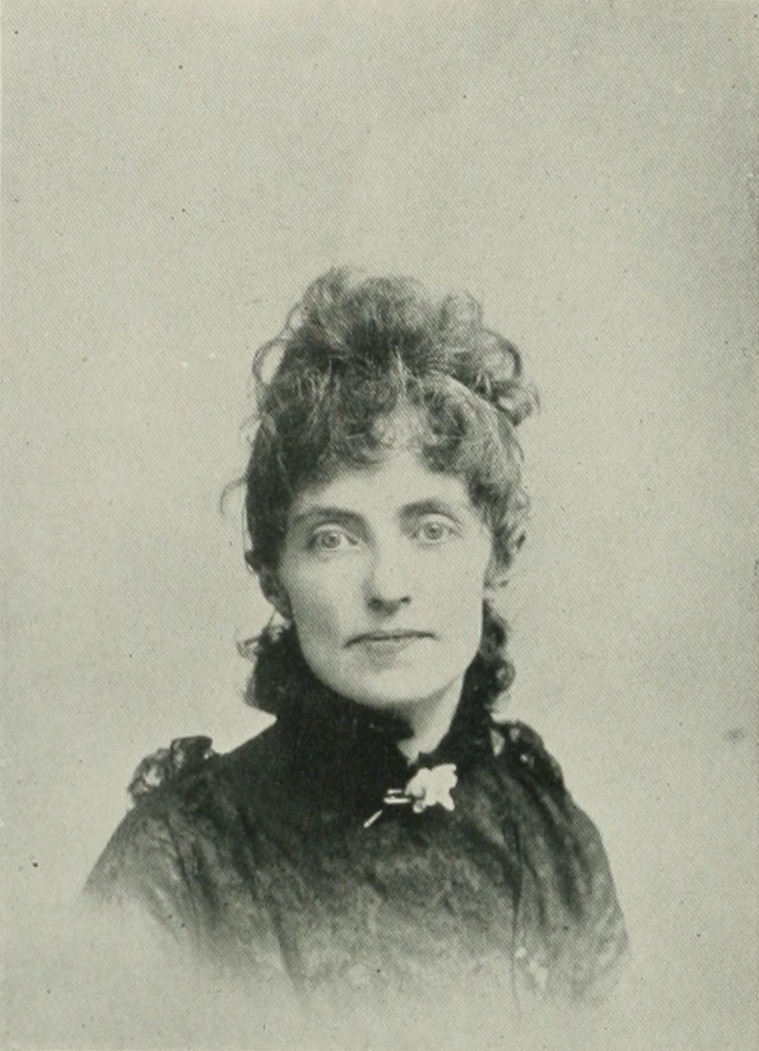
Callie Bonney Marble, A woman of the century

Callie Bonney Marble was an American author and lyricist.

== Early life ==
Callie Bonney was born in Peoria, Illinois, where her father, Charles C. Bonney, was a young lawyer just beginning practice. He shortly afterward moved to Chicago, Illinois, and later became known as President of the World's Congresses at the World's Columbian Exposition of 1893. In 1903 Bonney wrote Charles Carroll Bonney. In Memoriam for The Open Court.

Bonney attended the best schools in Chicago, and afterward was graduated from the Chestnut Street Seminary for young ladies, then located in Philadelphia, Pennsylvania, but later moved to Ogontz, Pennsylvania, cofounded in 1850 by Mary Bonney.

== Career ==
Callie Bonney Marble published two prose works, Wit and Wisdom of Bulwer and Wisdom and Eloquence of Webster.

Marble was a proficient French scholar and made translations of many of Victor Hugo's shorter works.

Marble's first writing for periodicals was a story, which was printed serially in a Chicago Masonic magazine. Since its appearance she wrote poems, sketches and stories for a great number of periodicals.

Marble wrote the words of a number of songs that have been set to music by Frederick Crouch, the composer of Kathleen Mavourneen, Eben H. Bailey and W. H. Doane. Marble wrote two operettas, one set to music by Bailey, and the other by Doane, and dramatized the Rienzi of Edward Bulwer-Lytton, an author who held a very warm place in her affections.

Marble did not begin to write until 1882, and much of her work had been done while in bed or on her lounge, due to her ill health. She accomplished a great deal, and gained a recognition that was general and gratifying.

On October 29, 1898, Clara Shortridge Foltz announced the opening of her practice in Denver, Colorado, and began to publish a weekly magazine, The Mecca in honor of woman suffrage in the state of which Callie Bonney Marble was co-editor with her husband.

== Personal life ==
In 1889 in San Francisco, Callie Bonney married Earl Marble (July 1837 - 1917), a well-known editor, art and dramatic critic, and author, and they resided in Chicago.
