= Luovi Halling =

US Navy sailor and Medal of Honor recipient

- Born: August 7, 1867; Stockholm, Sweden
- Died: March 22, 1928 (aged 60); East Elmhurst, New York, United States
- Military career
- Allegiance: United States
- Branch: United States Navy
- Rank: Boatswain's Mate First Class
- Units: USS Boston, USS Missouri (BB-11)
- Conflicts: Spanish–American War • Battle of Manila Bay
- Awards: Medal of Honor

Luovi Halling (August 7, 1867 – March 22, 1928) was a United States Navy sailor and a recipient of the United States military's highest decoration, the Medal of Honor, for attempting to rescue a shipmate from drowning during a storm.

== Biography ==
A native of Stockholm, Sweden, Halling joined the Navy from the state of New York. He participated in the first major engagement of the Spanish–American War, the 1898 Battle of Manila Bay, as a seaman aboard the USS Boston. He later reached the rank of boatswain's mate first class and served on the battleship USS Missouri (BB-11)

On the night of September 14, 1904, the Missouri was finishing up three weeks of target practice off the coast of Martha's Vineyard, Massachusetts, when a storm struck. In the early morning hours of September 15, with the storm still raging, the ship's anchor began to drag. A detachment of thirty sailors went to the forecastle to haul it in so that the Missouri could move to a safer location. As they were doing this, a large wave crashed over the deck, scattering the men and washing one youthful sailor, Ordinary Seaman Cecil C. Young, overboard. Halling and another man, Boatswain's Mate First Class Alexander Peters, jumped into the stormy water and swam towards Young. Wearing oilskins and heavy boots, Young sank beneath the waves and drowned before Halling and Peters could reach him. Due to the adverse weather, it was only with "utmost difficulty" that the two boatswain's mates were brought back onto the Missouri. For their attempt, both Halling and Peters were awarded the Medal of Honor weeks later, on October 4.

Halling's official Medal of Honor citation reads:

Serving on board the U.S.S. Missouri, for heroism in attempting to rescue from drowning Cecil C. Young, ordinary seaman, 15 September 1904.

Halling left the navy while still a boatswain's mate first class. He died at age 60.

== See also ==
- List of Medal of Honor recipients
