= Peter David (disambiguation) =

Peter David (1956–2025) was an American comics writer.

Peter David may also refer to:

- Peter David (journalist) (1951–2012), writer for The Economist
- Peter David (politician), Grenadian politician

== See also ==
- Peter H. Davids, Catholic priest and Biblical scholar
- Peter Davidson (disambiguation)
- David Peters (disambiguation)
