= David M. Peters Jr. =

American politician and businessman

David Martin Peters Jr. (January 30, 1911 – January 14, 1956) was an American politician and businessman.

Peters was born in Decatur, Illinois. He went to the Decatur schools. Peters was involved with his family's heating and plumbing business. He served in the United States Navy during World War II. Peters served on the Macon County Board of Supervisors from 1935 to 1939. He was involved with the Democratic Party and with organized labor. Peters served as sheriff of Macon County from 1951 to 1955. He then served in the Illinois House of Representatives from 1955 unil his death on January 14, 1956. Peters died at St. Mary's Hospital in Decatur, Illinois after suffering a cerebral hemorrhage at his home in Decatur, Illinois.
