= Kara Peters =

American mechanical and aerospace engineer

Kara J. Peters is an American mechanical and aerospace engineer whose research involves fiber-optic sensors and fiber Bragg gratings, and their applications to the nondestructive testing of advanced composite materials in aerospace and underwater environments. She is a distinguished professor in the Department of Mechanical and Aerospace Engineering at North Carolina State University, and associate dean of graduate programs and postdoctoral affairs in the university's College of Engineering.

== Education and career ==
Peters is originally from near Washington, D.C. She has a 1996 Ph.D. from the University of Michigan; her dissertation, Structural elements instrumented for load and integrity monitoring utilizing finite length displacement sensors, was supervised by Peter Washabaugh.

She was a postdoctoral researcher at the Ecole Polytechnique Fédérale de Lausanne before joining North Carolina State University in 2000. From 2015 to 2018, she was a program manager for the National Science Foundation, in its Mechanics of Materials and Structures Program. She became Alumni Association Distinguished Graduate Professor in 2021, and was named associate dean in 2024.

== Recognition ==
Peters is a Fellow of SPIE, elected in 2018. In 2024, the American Society of Mechanical Engineers (ASME) named her as an ASME Fellow.
