= Karen K. Peters =

American jurist (born 1947)

Presiding Justice of the New York Supreme Court, Appellate Division, Third Department
- In office April 5, 2012 – December 31, 2017
- Appointed by: Andrew Cuomo
- Preceded by: Anthony Cardona
- Succeeded by: Elizabeth Garry

Associate Justice of the New York Supreme Court, Appellate Division, Third Department
- In office February 3, 1994 – April 5, 2012
- Appointed by: Mario Cuomo

Personal details
- Born: July 29, 1947 (age 79)
- Party: Democratic
- Education: George Washington University; New York University School of Law

Karen K. Peters (born July 29, 1947) is an American jurist who served as Presiding Justice of the New York Supreme Court Appellate Division, Third Department from 2012 until her retirement in 2017 and was the first woman to serve in that role.

== Early life and education ==
Peters was raised on Long Island, New York. She attended The George Washington University (B.A., 1969) and received her J.D. degree from the New York University School of Law (1972).

== Legal career ==
Peters began her legal career in private practice in New Paltz, New York in the areas of criminal defense and matrimonial law. She later briefly served as an Assistant District Attorney in Dutchess County, New York and has taught at the State University of New York at New Paltz.

From 1979 to 1983, Peters served as counsel to the State Division of Alcoholism and Alcohol Abuse. She was named director of the New York State Assembly Government Operations Committee in 1983, and served in that position until her election to the bench later that year.

Peters was first elected Family Court Judge in Ulster County, New York, in 1983.

Peters was elected to the Supreme Court in New York's Third Judicial Department in 1992 and re-elected in 2006.

Peters was appointed to the Appellate Division, Third Department in 1994 by then-Governor Mario Cuomo. She was named Presiding Justice of the Third Department on April 5, 2012.

Peters has served as chair of the New York State Bar Association's (NYSBA's) Committee on Judicial Wellness and a member of several NYSBA committees including the Special Committee on Alcoholism and Drug Abuse, the Special Committee on Procedures for Judicial Discipline and the President's Committee on Access to Justice. She has also served as a member of the New York State Commission on Judicial Conduct and a member of the New York State Permanent Judicial Commission on Justice for Children.

In 2018, Peters was named chair of the New York State Unified Court System Commission on Parental Legal Representation and chair of the New York State Permanent Commission on Justice for Children.

== Notable Achievements ==
Peters was the first woman to serve as Presiding Justice of the Appellate Division, Third Department and was the first woman elected to Supreme Court in the entire Third Judicial Department. She was also the first woman to serve as Family Court Judge in Ulster County's history.

Peters has received the following awards: the Howard A. Levine Award for Excellence in Juvenile Justice and Child Welfare; the Betty Weinberg Ellerin Mentoring Award; the State Bar Association's Judicial Section Inaugural Award for Advancement of Judicial Diversity; the Center for Women in Government and Civil Society's Public Service Leadership Award; the Capital District Women's Bar Association's Judge Kaye Distinguished Membership Attorney Award; Albany Law School's Kate Stoneman Award; and the Robert L. Haig Award for Distinguished Public Service.
