= Alexander Peters =

- Born: November 16, 1869; Russia
- Died: June 11, 1951 (aged 81); Martha's Vineyard, Massachusetts, U.S.
- Burial place: Arlington National Cemetery
- Military career
- Allegiance: United States
- Branch: United States Navy
- Rank: Chief Gunner's Mate
- Unit: USS Missouri (BB-11)
- Awards: Medal of Honor

Alexander Peters (November 16, 1869 – June 11, 1951) was a United States Navy sailor and a recipient of the United States military's highest decoration, the Medal of Honor, for attempting to rescue a shipmate from drowning during a storm.

== Biography ==
A native of Russia, Peters joined the Navy from Pennsylvania and served as a boatswain's mate first class on the USS Missouri (BB-11).

On the night of September 14, 1904, the Missouri was finishing up three weeks of target practice off the coast of Martha's Vineyard, Massachusetts, when a storm struck. In the early morning hours of September 15, with the storm still raging, the ship's anchor began to drag. A detachment of thirty sailors went to the forecastle to haul it in so that the Missouri could move to a safer location. As they were doing this, a large wave crashed over the deck, scattering the men and washing one youthful sailor, Ordinary Seaman Cecil C. Young, overboard. Peters and another man, Boatswain's Mate First Class Luovi Halling, jumped into the stormy water and swam towards Young. Wearing oilskins and heavy boots, Young sank beneath the waves and drowned before Peters and Halling could reach him. Due to the adverse weather, it was only with "utmost difficulty" that the two boatswain's mates were brought back onto the Missouri. For their attempt, both Peters and Halling were awarded the Medal of Honor weeks later, on October 4.

Peters reached the rank of chief gunner's mate before leaving the military. He died at age 81 and was buried at Arlington National Cemetery in Arlington County, Virginia.

== Medal of Honor citation ==
Peters' official Medal of Honor citation reads:

For heroism in attempting to rescue from drowning Cecil C. Young, ordinary seaman, 15 September 1904, while serving on board the U.S.S. Missouri.

== See also ==
- List of Medal of Honor recipients during peacetime
