= Charles C. Bonney =

American judge

Charles Carroll Bonney
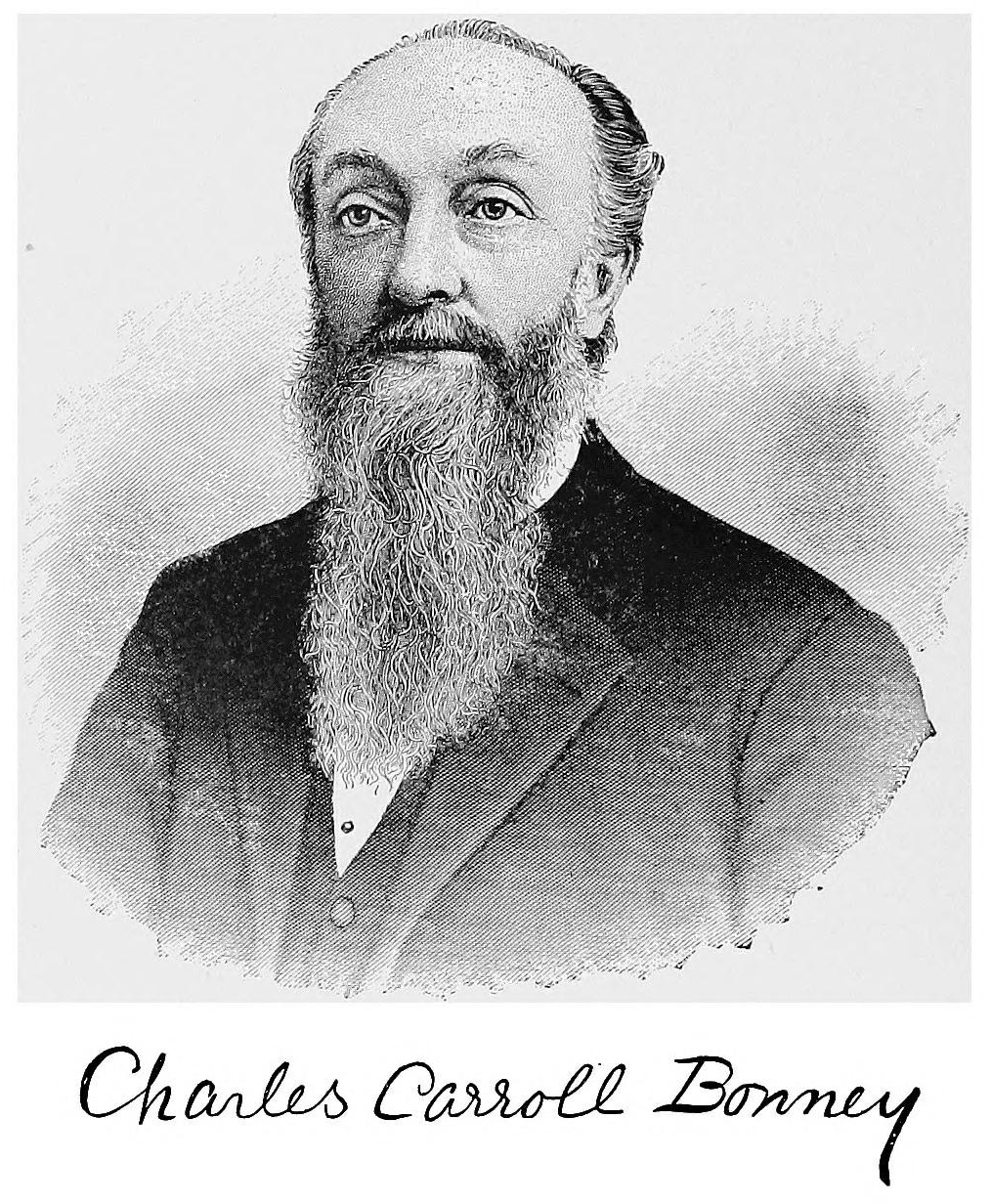
- Born: September 4, 1831; Hamilton, New York
- Died: August 23, 1903 (aged 71); Chicago, Illinois, USA
- Occupations: Lawyer; judge; teacher; author; orator

Charles Carroll Bonney (1831–1903) was an American lawyer, judge, teacher, author, and orator based in Chicago. He was best known for serving as president of the World's Congresses at the World's Columbian Exposition of 1893.

== Biography ==
Charles C. Bonney was born in Hamilton, New York on September 4, 1831. He was schooled in Hamilton, and attended Colgate University, eventually receiving his LL.D. After a brief stint as a teacher in Hamilton, Bonney moved to Peoria, Illinois, where he founded a school. In 1852, he became a lecturer in education at Peoria College, and in this capacity played a role in setting up the Illinois state school system.

Bonney moved to Chicago in 1860. In 1866, he became a judge of the Supreme Court of Illinois. He participated in the foundation of the International Law and Order League in Toronto in 1880, and later served as that organization's president from 1885 to 1893. Bonney was president of the Illinois State Bar Association in 1882. He was also active in the American Bar Association, serving as Vice President in 1887, and in that capacity gaining notoriety in the press, with many journalists calling for Bonney to be appointed to the Supreme Court of the United States.

A member of the New Jerusalem Church, Bonney played an active role in organizing the Parliament of the World's Religions, held in conjunction with the World's Columbian Exposition of 1893. Over 200 "World's Congresses" or "World's Parliaments" were held in conjunction with the World's Columbian Exposition (besides the Parliament of the World's Religions, there were also congresses of anthropology, labor, medicine, temperance, commerce and finance, literature, history, art, philosophy, and science). Bonney served as president of the combined World Congresses.

Bonney published several books in his lifetime, the most notable of which were his Handbook of the Law of Railway Carriers, Summary of the Law of Insurance, The World's Parliament of Religions, and The World's Congress Addresses.

Bonney took ill in 1900, and, after three years' sickness, died of paralysis on August 23, 1903 in Chicago. His daughter, Callie Bonney Marble, was an author and lyricist.
