= John M. Peters =

American politician (1927–2013)

John Peters
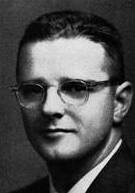
- Official Legislative Portrait

Member of the Iowa House of Representatives from the 62nd district
- In office January 12, 1953 – January 9, 1955
- Preceded by: Francis E. Tierney
- Succeeded by: Willard Freed

Personal details
- Born: January 16, 1927 Rochester, Minnesota
- Died: February 4, 2013 (aged 86) Fort Dodge, Iowa
- Party: Republican
- Education: University of Iowa; University of Iowa College of Law
- Profession: Attorney
- Website: Peters' website

John Merrell Peters (January 16, 1927 – February 4, 2013) was an American lawyer and legislator.

Born in Rochester, Minnesota, Peters grew up in DeWitt, Iowa. He served in the United States Navy during World War II. He received his bachelor's degree from the University of Iowa and his law degree from the University of Iowa College of Law. He practiced law in Fort Dodge, Iowa. He served in the Iowa House of Representatives in 1953–1955 as a Republican.

Iowa House of Representatives
Preceded by Francis E. Tierney	62nd District; 1953 – 1955	Succeeded by Willard Freed
