= William Thompson Peters =

American politician (1805–1885)

Member of the Connecticut General Assembly
- In office 1861 and 1873

Member of the Connecticut Senate from the 6th district
- In office 1857–1858

Personal details
- Born: May 30, 1805 Hebron, Connecticut, U.S.
- Died: July 24, 1885 (aged 80) Waterbury, Connecticut, U.S.
- Resting place: Cheshire, Connecticut, U.S.
- Party: Union
- Spouse: Etha L. Town (m. 1826)
- Children: 3
- Relatives: John Samuel Peters (uncle)
- Education: Yale College; Yale Medical School (MD)
- Occupation: Politician; businessman; farmer; judge

William Thompson Peters (May 30, 1805 – July 24, 1885) was an American politician from Connecticut.

== Early life ==
William Thompson Peters was born on May 30, 1805, in Hebron, Connecticut, to Elizabeth (née Caulkins) and John Thompson Peters. His father was a judge of the Connecticut Supreme Court. His uncle was Connecticut governor John Samuel Peters. He entered Yale College from his father's residence in Hartford. He graduated from Yale in 1825. He stayed in New Haven and studied medicine under William Tully. He graduated from Yale Medical School with a Doctor of Medicine in 1830.

== Career ==
Peters founded a drug store in New Haven called "Apothecaries' Hall". In 1851, due to poor health, he moved to Cheshire, Connecticut, to engage in farming.

In 1857, Peters was associated with the Union Party. He served as a member of the Connecticut Senate, representing the 6th district, in 1857. He represented Cheshire in the Connecticut General Assembly in 1861 and 1873. He served as town clerk, treasurer, and probate judge. He was a collector of internal revenue under President Abraham Lincoln.

== Personal life ==
Peters married Etha L. Town, daughter of New Haven architect Ithiel Town, on December 7, 1826. They had three children, including Charles W.

In 1881, Peters moved to Waterbury, Connecticut, to live with his son. He died there on July 24, 1885. He was buried in Cheshire.
