= Carl-Ludwig Peters =

German field hockey player

Carl-Ludwig Peters (born 31 March 1921) is a German former field hockey player who competed in the 1952 Summer Olympics.
