= Eric Peters (painter) =

German painter

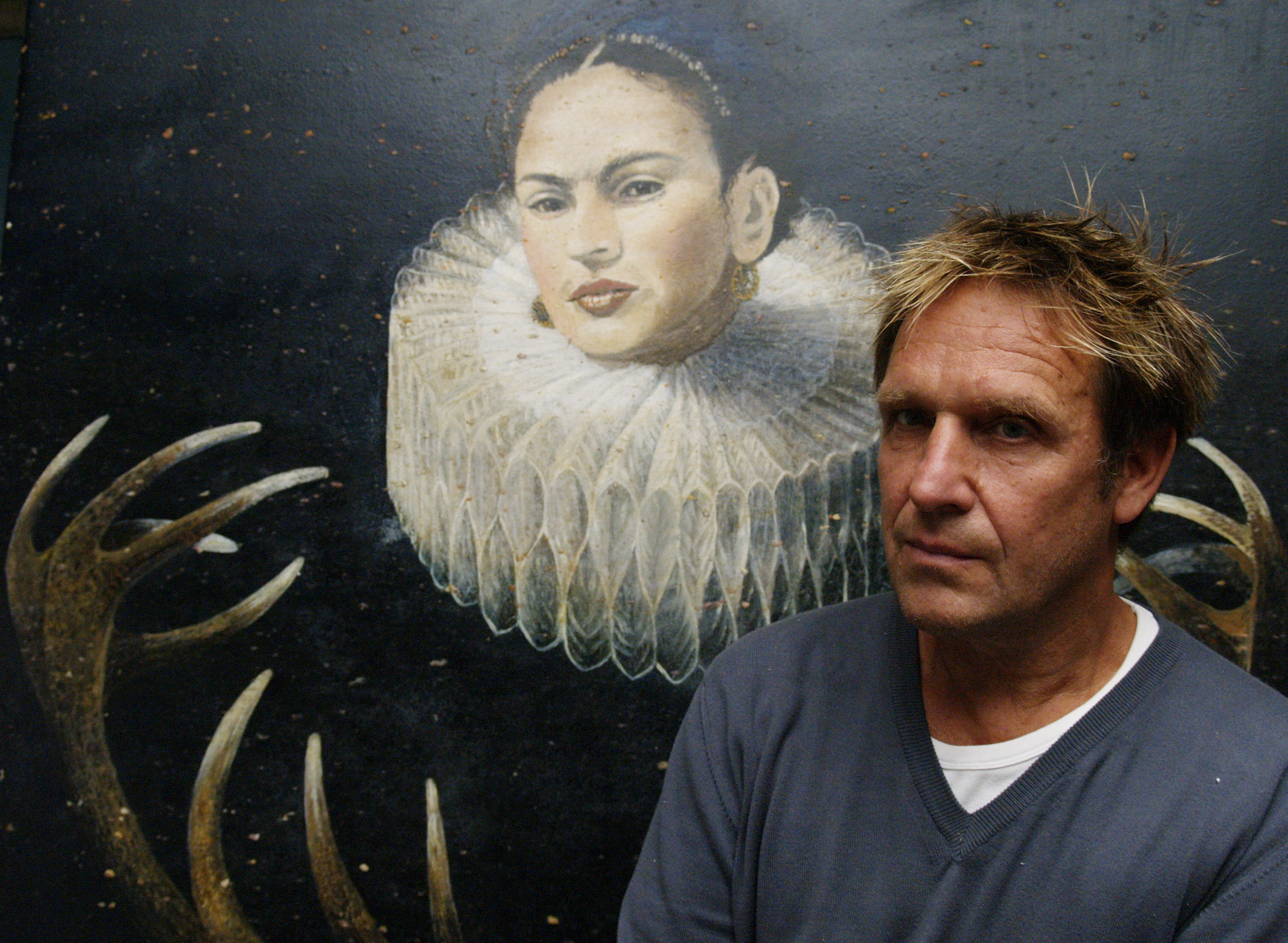
- Born: 3 October 1952 (age 73); Stolberg, West Germany
- Known for: Painting

Eric Peters (born 3 October 1952 in Stolberg (Rhineland), Germany) is a German painter, who now lives and works in Aachen.

== Life ==
After Eric Peters had finished his high school education he joined the Fachhochschule Aachen – the University of Applied Science in Aachen where he graduated from his fashion design studies with distinction in 1974. Peters is one of the famous graduates of this university. After joining an "Exhibition of Young Artists" at the Suermondt-Ludwig-Museum of Aachen, he was rewarded in 1976 with the Sponsorship Award of the City of Aachen. In 1976 Eric Peters joined the II. Symposium of the German-French-Youth-Exchange Organisation in the French town Bordeaux and realised the Kultur-Natur-Pyramide (Land Art in the Pyrenees). In 1979 Peters was sponsored by the German-French-Youth-Exchange Organisation, which allowed him to deepen his studies of art and design in France. Since 1979 Peters also designed and crafted furniture. In 1982 Peters founded the Design-Pool company. Peters' interest in east-Asian philosophies and life led him in 1986 to an intensive engagement with the Yoga-school of Vanda Scaravelli. His personal teacher at that time was Sandra Sabatini. Since 1987, Peters worked as a freelance artist. Peters has been successful in Europe and the U.S. and has had an exhibition in St. Petersburg, Russia.

== Opus ==
Painting of Eric Peters in a German private house
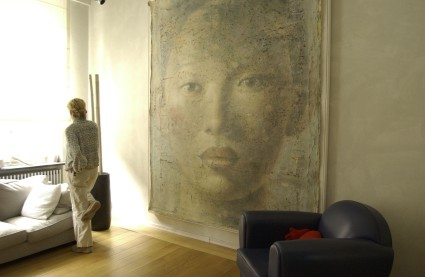

Eric Peters work circles the secrets of the creation and the depths of the human soul, which he aims to explore with the motif repertoire of portrait, landscape and animals. Anchored in the traditions of Symbolism, Dada, Surrealism and the Viennese School in Fantasia realism, he uses several traditions of the history of art. Eric Peters "charms the viewer with the high quality of execution and with the polisemy of the fantastic world of the unusual images. Playing with the human mentality, with our emotions and customary ideas about surrounding life is in the basis of Peters's art." "The circle as a symbol of perfect harmony is found as a compositional basic element of Eric Peters painting in many of his works." The circle refers to the struggle of the artist with the philosophical systems of East Asia. "Eric Peters's images draw the viewer with a fascinating force in a strange spell. The bizarre aesthetics of flawless strange women, animals and mythical creatures touch the human longing for mystery and beauty." The illusion in the area and the sensuality of the paintings arouse the viewer's desire to explore the surface of the images not only with the eyes, but to touch the images, the flawless complexion of the woman faces, the skins of wild cats and the glass and to touch metal surfaces of bowls and jars. Eric Peters is a painter "of consciousness, a visualizer of psychic and psychotic states," writes Alexander Borovsky, head of the department for contemporary art movements of the Russian State Museum (Государственный Русский музей) Saint Petersburg in the catalog of the exhibition Light Games, and explains at the end of his remarks: "Eric Peters found a way that will be needed, since many feel a lack in modern art, a deficit of visual challenge to neo-Baroque, sculptural exuberance, of acrobatic circus tricks, and finally a lack of mystery. Peters' (art) is a kind of antidote for Hermeticism and the rationality of modern art. I think it works." On 30 August 2010 Eckhard Hoog in the Aachener Nachrichten Online reported that Eric Peters "makes splash in Saint Petersburg" and plans a further exhibition in Houston, Texas, next year.

Eric Peters describes the process and results of his work as a "Q-bistic superposition". "The QBism (or derived Bayesian concept of probability) is an interpretation of the quantum theory that denies the objectivity of the quantum state and conceives it as an expression of a subjective belief of the observer" (because :)"a measurement reveales no pre-existing state of things' says Christopher Fuchs of the perimeter Institute in Waterloo Canada, one of the founders of the QBism,"(but:) "it is something that does an actor with the world and leading to the creation of a result, a new experience for this actor." What Eric Peters happens in the creative painting process with his work, is figuratively that what the quantum mechanical examiner does with himself and the world.

== Exhibitions ==
The exhibition "Young Artists of Aachen" (Junge Kuenstler in Aachen) at the Suermondt-Ludwig-Museum in Aachen 1973 marks the beginning of Peters' public perception, then followed:

- 1975 Kostümspiel. drawings, Stadttheater Aachen
- 1976 Installationen. Atrium, Neue Galerie, Sammlung Ludwig, Aachen.
- 1979 Sonnensysteme. Installationen, Galerie Hock, Aachen (Kat.) – Bodeninstallationen. Galerie Porsch, Düsseldorf (Kat.).
- 1987 Galerie Werkhof Bissendorf, Hannover.
- 1993 Neue Arbeiten, Bock-Galerie, Aachen (Kat.); Palladium I, Pallas GmbH, Brühl.
- 1994 Antestadt, Museu Nacional de Belas Artes, Rio de Janeiro (Kat.).
- 1996 Fünf buddhistische Mönche aus dem Kloster des Dalai Lama malen Sand-Mandalas im Ludwig-Forum für Internationale Kunst, Aachen; Galerie Dante, Amsterdam; Idee und Umsetzung des Projektes.
- 1997 Werke, Galerie Camue, Mannheim (Kat.).
- 1998 Galerie Linde Trottenberg, Bonn.
- 1999 Westland Place Gallery, London.
- 2001 Palladium X, Pallas GmbH, Brühl.
- 2002 I Am The Rabbit In Your Headlight, Klinik für Epileptologie, Rheinische Friedrich-Wilhelms-Universität, Bonn.
- 2003 Elf leere Schalen, MultiArt International, Bonn.
- 2005 Im Auge des Tigers, Suermond-Ludwig-Museum, Aachen.
- 2006 Twice / Was Your Queen. Gremillion Fine Art Inc., Houston, Texas.
- 2010 Lichtspiele. Russisches Museum, Sankt Petersburg; Von Angesicht zu Angesicht. Malerei von Eric Peters, Geschäftstelle der Deutschen Forschungsgemeinschaft, in Kooperation mit MultiArt International, Bonn.
- 2012 Art Track, Zuidstationstraat 8, Gent, Belgien
- 2012 Gremillion & Co. Fine Art. Inc., Houston und Dallas, Texas
- 2012 IKOB - Museum für Zeitgenössische Kunst, Eupen / Belgien
- 2013 Galerie Brennecke, Berlin, One-man-show, art Karlsruhe 2013
- 2014 art Karlsruhe 2014
- 2014 Europa entführen, Exhibition in the framework program for the award of the International Charlemagne Prize of Aachen.

== Literature ==
- Von Trottenberg, Linde: Eric Peters – Circular motions - (Kreisbewegungen). Vandenhoff & Ruprecht, 2004. ISBN 3-525-47008-8.
- Borovski, Alexander: Lightplay (Lichtspiele). Catalog, August. 2010. Russian State Museum (Staatliches Russisches Museum - Ludwig Museum im Russischen Museum), St. Petersburg. Palace Editions, 2010, ISBN 978-3-940761-74-3.
