= David Peters (professor) =

David Peters is a professor of integrated healthcare at the University of Westminster.

== Career ==
Peters trained as a family doctor and later in osteopathic medicine and as a musculoskeletal physician. From 1990 until 2005, he directed the complementary therapies development programme at Marylebone Health Centre (MHC), a Central London NHS GP unit set up in 1986 to develop new approaches to inner city primary healthcare.

Peters was among the founding faculty of the University of Westminster School of Integrated Health which merged with the Department of Bioscience in 2009 to form the School of Life Sciences.

== Publications ==
Peters has co-authored or edited five books about integrated healthcare. His works include co-author/editorship of the Encyclopaedia of Complementary Medicine and Understanding the Placebo Effect in Complementary Medicine.

== Research and clinical interests ==
Peters has led a series of research projects concerned with implementing or evaluating of complementary medicine in mainstream settings. One current project is developing PCT-wide access to acupuncture and stress reduction for people with long-term low back pain. Peters was, until 2010, chair of the British Holistic Medical Association, whose Journal of Holistic Healthcare he edits. He is a director of The College of Medicine whose aim is to encourage medicine to move in a more patient-centred and values-based direction.

His clinical work as a musculo-skeletal physician includes osteopathy and acupuncture, and by somatically-oriented psychotherapeutic methods devised by Peter Levine, as well as exploration of working with the relaxation response, yoga, and meditation. A particular clinical interest is in dysregulatory syndromes where persistent pain and/or fatigue commonly overlap with trauma and breathing pattern disorders. His research and development interests include the role of non-pharmaceutical treatments in mainstream medicine, and self-care – particularly in long term conditions.
