= Madison Clinton Peters =

American minister

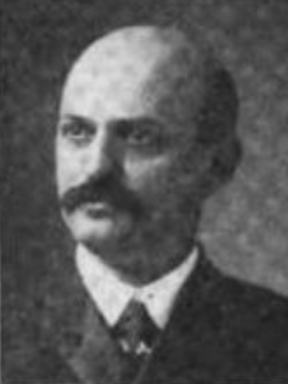
- Born: November 6, 1859; Lehigh County, Pennsylvania
- Died: October 12, 1918 (aged 58); Manhattan, New York
- Education: Franklin and Marshall College and Heidelberg Theological Seminary
- Religion: Reformed Church and then "free" preacher
- Church: First Presbyterian Church, Philadelphia; Bloomingdale Reformed, New York; Sumner Avenue Baptist, Brooklyn; Immanuel Baptist, Baltimore; and Epiphany (Episcopal), New York

Madison Clinton Peters (November 6, 1859 – October 12, 1918) was an American clergyman.

== Formative years ==
Born in Lehigh County, Pennsylvania, in 1859, Peters was educated at Franklin and Marshall College, and at Heidelberg Theological Seminary, Tiffin, Ohio.

In 1880, he entered the ministry of the reformed church, remaining under that church's leadership until 1907 when he gave up a denominational connection to become a "free" preacher. Peters served as pastor of: First Presbyterian Church, Philadelphia; Bloomingdale Reformed, New York; Sumner Avenue Baptist, Brooklyn; Immanuel Baptist, Baltimore; and Epiphany (Episcopal), New York.

== Death and interment ==
Peters died on October 12, 1918, in Manhattan, and was interred at the Kensico Cemetery in Valhalla, New York.

== Bibliography ==
- Justice to the Jew (1899; new edition, revised, 1910)
- Wit and wisdom of the Talmud (1900)
- The Birds of the Bible (1901)
- Will the Coming Man Marry? (1905)
- Abraham Lincoln's Religion (1909)
- Haym Salomon (1911)
- The Mission of Masonry (1913)
- The Genius of the Jew (1914)
- How to be Happy Though Married (1915)
- The Seven Secrets of Success (1916)
