= K. P. Mohanakumar =

Indian chemical biologist

- Born: 1955 (age 70–71); Kerala, India
- Education: University of Kerala; Aligarh Muslim University; Saurashtra University; National Institutes of Health; University of Göttingen; University of Essen; University of Virginia Medical Centre
- Known for: Studies on Parkinson's disease and Huntington's disease
- Awards: 1991 ICMR Young Scientist Award; 2000 N-BIOS Prize; IPS Uvnas Prize; IAN Tulsabai Somani Educational Trust Award
- Scientific career
- Fields: Chemical biology; Neuroscience
- Workplaces: Inter University Centre for Biomedical Research; Academy of Scientific and Innovative Research; Indian Institute of Chemical Biology; IISER Thiruvananthapuram

Kochupurackal P. Mohanakumar (born 1955) is an Indian chemical biologist, neuroscientist and the director of Inter University Centre for Biomedical Research and Super Specialty Hospital, Kottayam. He is a former chief scientist at the Indian Institute of Chemical Biology and is known for his studies on Parkinson's disease and Huntington's disease. The Department of Biotechnology of the Government of India awarded him the National Bioscience Award for Career Development, one of the highest Indian science awards, for his contributions to biosciences in 2000.

== Biography ==
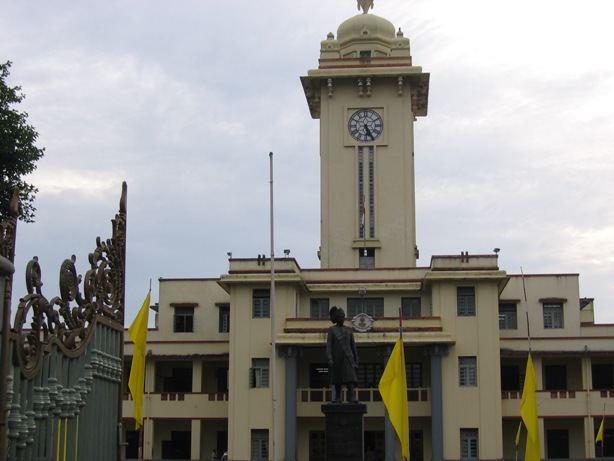
University of Kerala

Born in the south Indian state of Kerala in 1955, Mohanakumar did his undergraduate studies at the University of Kerala to earn a B.Sc. in zoology in 1976. His master's studies were at Aligarh Muslim University and after obtaining an M.Sc. in experimental biology and chemical neuroanatomy, in 1979, he enrolled at Saurashtra University for his doctoral studies to secure a PhD in neuropharmacology in 1985. His post-doctoral work and advanced training were at the National Institutes of Health, University of Göttingen, University of Essen, and the University of Virginia Medical Centre.

On his return to India, he joined the Indian Institute of Science Education and Research, Thiruvananthapuram where he served as a professor of biological sciences. Subsequently, he moved to the Indian Institute of Chemical Biology of the Council of Scientific and Industrial Research and was serving as the chief scientist at the Cell Biology and Physiology Division and as the head of the Project Monitoring and Evaluation Division, when he returned to his home state as the director of Inter University Centre for Biomedical Research and Super Specialty Hospital, Kottayam, a position he holds to date. He simultaneously serves as the convenor of the governing council of the institution. He has also served as a professor at the Academy of Scientific and Innovative Research.

== Legacy ==
Mohanakumar is known to have done notable work on neurodegenerative and neurodevelopmental disorders such as Parkinson's disease, Huntington's disease, autism and attention deficit hyperactivity disorder. It was under his leadership, an advanced clinical and experimental research laboratory on neurodegenerative diseases was established at the Indian Institute of Chemical Biology where research is carried out on the pathogenesis of Parkinson's disease. AT IICB, he headed a cybrids laboratory, reported to be one of the most advanced ones in India, and was involved in the study of neurodegenerative diseases, with special emphasis to the impact of mitochondria. His studies have been documented by way of a number of articles (Note: Please see Selected bibliography section) and ResearchGate, an online repository of scientific articles has listed 184 of them. Besides, he has edited work books for practicing neurobiologists and has contributed chapters to books edited by others. He has mentored several master's and doctoral scholars in their research and has delivered many invited speeches, which included the one delivered at Amrita BioQuest 2013.

Mohanakumar has been an elected member of the International Society for Neurochemistry and sits in its conference committee. He is a former president of the Society of Neurochemistry India and a former vice-president of the Indian Academy of Neurosciences. He has been associated with TWAS as well as UNESCO as a professor, with the Department of Biotechnology as a member of its Neurobiology Task Force, and is a member of the Chemical Biology Society. He sits in the editorial boards of journals such as Anatomy and Cell Biology, Neuroscience and Medicine, Journal of Neurochemistry, Neurochemistry International, and Neurochemical Research.

== Awards and honors ==
Mohanakumar, an elected member of Guha Research Conference, received the Young Scientist Award of the Indian Council of Medical Research in 1991. The Indian Academy of Neurosciences elected him as a fellow in 1999 and a year later, the Department of Biotechnology of the Government of India awarded him the National Bioscience Award for Career Development, one of the highest Indian science awards in 2000. The elected fellowship of the National Academy of Sciences, India was awarded to him 2008. He is also a recipient of the Uvnas Prize of the Indian Pharmacological Society for the best scientific publication and the Tulsabai Somani Educational Trust Award of Indian Academy of Neurosciences. The award orations delivered by him include Coln. R. N. Chopra Memorial Oration of Indian Pharmacological Society and Prof. B.K. Bachhawat Memorial Life Time Achievement (2019).

== Selected bibliography ==
=== Chapters ===
- Alexander Storch, Michael A. Collins (Editors); K. P. Mohanakumar, D. Muralikrishnan )(Chapter authors) (6 December 2012). Neurotoxic Factors in Parkinson's Disease and Related Disorders. Springer Science & Business Media. pp. 290–. ISBN 978-1-4615-1269-1.
- Sengupta T., Vinayagam J., Singh R., Jaisankar P., Mohanakumar K.P. (6 December 2016). Plant-Derived Natural Products for Parkinson's Disease Therapy. In: Essa M., Akbar M., Guillemin G. (eds) The Benefits of Natural Products for Neurodegenerative Diseases. Advances in Neurobiology, vol 12. Springer, Cham.

=== Articles ===
- Chakraborty J, Rajamma U, Mohanakumar KP (2014). "A mitochondrial basis for Huntington's disease: therapeutic prospects". Mol. Cell. Biochem. 389 (1–2): 277–291. doi:10.1007/s11010-013-1951-9. PMID 24374792. S2CID 12998766.
- Chakraborty J, Nthenge-Ngumbau DN, Rajamma U, Mohanakumar KP (2014). "Melatonin protects against behavioural dysfunctions and dendritic spine damage in 3-nitropropionic acid-induced rat model of Huntington's disease". Behav. Brain Res. 1 (264): 91–104. doi:10.1016/j.bbr.2014.01.048. PMID 24509309. S2CID 926656.
- Paidi RK, Nthenge-Ngumbau DN, Singh R, Kankanala T, Mehta H, Mohanakumar KP (2015). "Mitochondrial Deficits Accompany Cognitive Decline Following Single Bilateral Intracerebroventricular Streptozotocin". Curr Alzheimer Res. 12 (8): 785–795. doi:10.2174/1567205012666150710112618. PMID 26159195.

== See also ==
- Melatonin
- Neurotoxicity
