= John Peters =

John Peters may refer to:

== Politicians ==
- John A. Peters (1822–1904), U.S. Representative from Maine (1867–1873), Attorney General of Maine (1864–1866) & Maine Supreme Court judge
- John A. Peters (1864–1953), U.S. Representative from Maine (1913–1922) and U.S. District Court judge (1922–1947)
- John E. Peters (1839–1919), businessman and politician in Newfoundland
- John M. Peters (1927–2013), American lawyer and legislator
- John Samuel Peters (1772–1858), Governor of Connecticut (1831–1833)

== Others ==
- John Peters (catcher) (1893–1932), baseball player from Kansas City
- John Peters (chess player) (born 1951), American chess player and newspaper columnist
- John Peters (DJ) (1949 or 1950–2025), British radio presenter
- John Peters (RAF officer) (born 1961)
- John Peters (shortstop) (1850–1924), baseball player from New Orleans
- John Durham Peters (born 1958), communications professor
- John F. Peters (1884–1969), electrical engineer
- John P. Peters (1887–1955), American chemist
- John Punnett Peters (1852–1921), American Episcopal clergyman

== See also ==
- Jon Peters (born 1945), American movie producer
- Jon Peters (pitcher) (born 1970), high school pitcher from Texas
- Jonathan Peters (born 1969), American music remixer/DJ
