= María Teresa Miras Portugal =

Spanish scientist (1948–2021)

- Born: 19 February 1948; Carballiño, Orense, Spain
- Died: 27 May 2021 (aged 73)
- Education: University of Santiago de Compostela, University of Strasbourg (PhD), Complutense University of Madrid
- Known for: First woman elected President of a Spanish "Real Academia"
- Awards: Alberto Sols medal for Research in Biochemistry, María Josefa Wonenburger Planells Prize by the Xunta de Galicia, Miguel Catalán Research Award, Castelao Medal
- Scientific career
- Fields: Biochemistry: nucleotide receptors and neurodegenerative diseases
- Institutions: University of Oviedo, University of Murcia, Complutense University of Madrid

María Teresa Miras Portugal (19 February 1948 – 27 May 2021) was a Spanish scientist, pharmacist, biochemist, molecular biologist and Emeritus professor at the Complutense University of Madrid. She was a member of the Spanish "Real Academia Nacional de Farmacia" and served as President of this Institution from 2007 to 2013, becoming the first woman to be elected for this position in a Spanish "Real Academia". She was Honorary President.

She was also a member of several scientific institutions such as the Spanish Biophysical Society, the Spanish Society of Biochemistry and Molecular Biology, the Spanish Society of Neuroscience, the European Society for Neurochemistry, the International Society for Neurochemistry, the Advisory Board of Chromaffin Cells, the Purinergic Club, the editorial board of the Journal of Neurochemistry, the IUPHAR sub-committee for the nomenclature of P2Y nucleotide receptors and the Scientific Panel of the NATO.

== Biography ==
María Teresa Miras Portugal was born in 1948 in O Carballiño (Orense), where she completed her primary and secondary studies. She started her university studies in Pharmacy in the University of Santiago de Compostela and continued them at the Complutense University of Madrid. Her marks at the Licenciate university degree led her to get a Special Mention at National Level. She completed a PhD in Sciences at the University of Strasbourg and Pharmacy at the Complutense University of Madrid. She later became a professor of Biochemistry and Molecular Biology at the University of Oviedo, the University of Murcia and the Complutense University of Madrid.

In her more than 40 years engaged in research, she focused in the study of nucleotide receptors and their impact on neurodegenerative diseases and published more than 350 research articles in specialized journals, combining this research with teaching and institutional work. In 2012, she was appointed president of the Committee of Experts for the study of the need for reforms in the Spanish university system.

== Awards ==
In 2005 she received the Alberto Sols Medal to Research in Biochemistry, in 2008 the María Josefa Wonenburger Planells Prize by the Xunta de Galicia, in 2011 the Community of Madrid honoured her with the Miguel Catalán Research Award for her entire professional career and in 2016 in Galicia received the Castelao Medal.

She was given honorary doctorates from the University of Murcia and the King Juan Carlos University and was an honorific member of the Academia Nacional de Farmacia y Bioquímica de Argentina, Académie Nationale de Pharmacie de France, Académie Européenne des Sciences des Arts et des Lettres and the European Academy (physiology and medicine).
