= List of University of Wyoming people =

This is a list of University of Wyoming people who have some significant affiliation with the school. Individuals listed may have only attended the university at one point and not necessarily have graduated.

== Faculty ==
- Merav Ben-David (Hebrew: מירב בן-דוד; January 17, 1959–) – chair of the Department of Zoology and Physiology and Democratic nominee in the 2020 United States Senate election in Wyoming
- Ana Paula Höfling – professor of dance
- Elizabeth Orpha Sampson Hoyt (1828–1912) – philosopher, author, lecturer
- Samuel Howell Knight – geology professor, 1916–1966
- Randi Martinsen – former president of the American Association of Petroleum Geologists Foundation
- Gale W. McGee (1915–1992) – professor of history and international affairs, U.S. senator (D-WY) (1959–1977), and U.S. ambassador to the Organization of American States (1977–1981)
- Aven Nelson (1859–1952) – botanist and UW president (1918–1922)
- Glen Anderson Rebka, Jr. (1931–2015) – head of Physics Department
- Robert Russin (1914–2007) – sculptor
- Kenneth Sims – professor of Isotope Geology, National Geographic explorer, Papadopoulos Fellow
- Allan Arthur Willman (1909–1989) – composer, head of the Music Department

== Alumni ==
=== Athletics ===
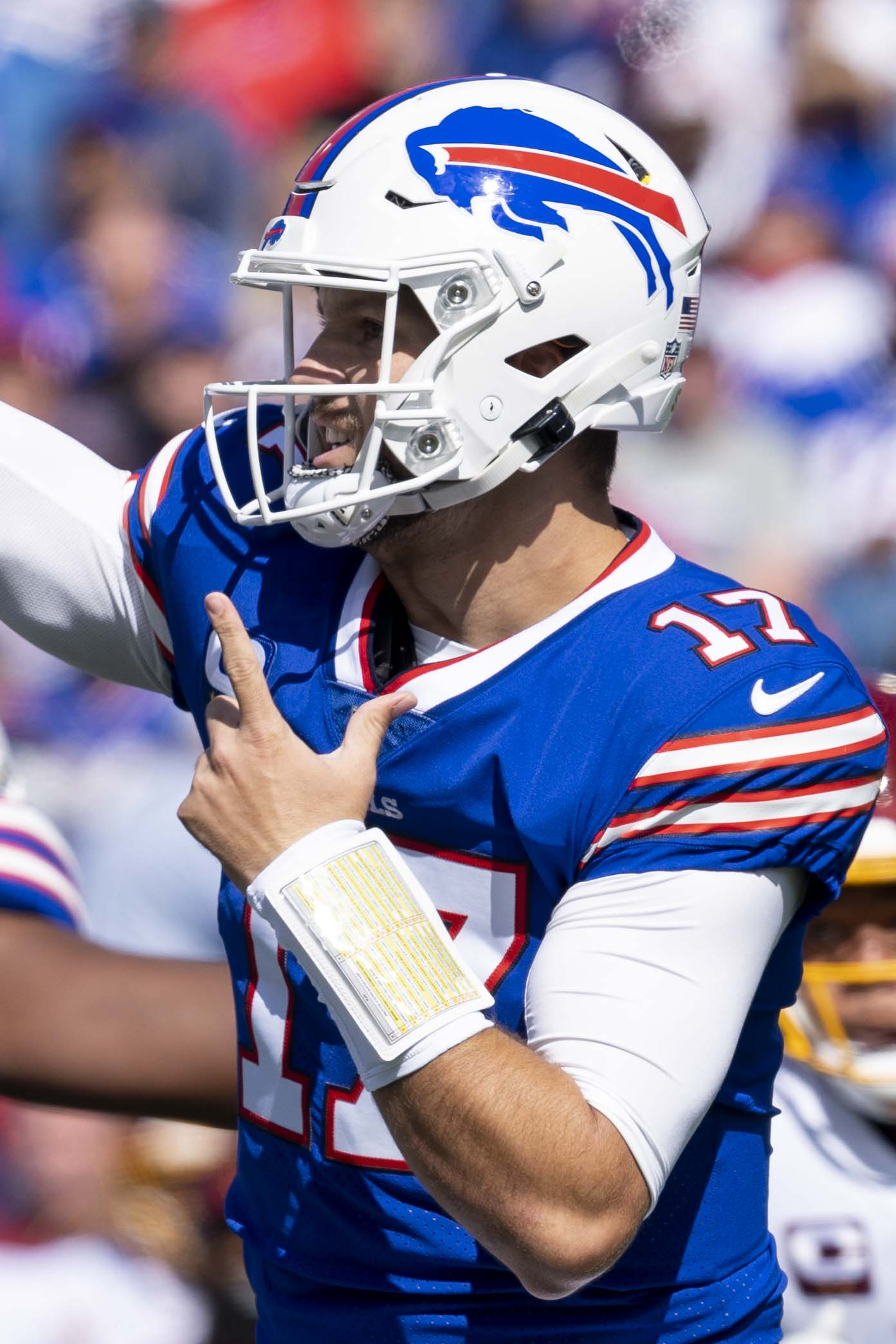
Josh Allen

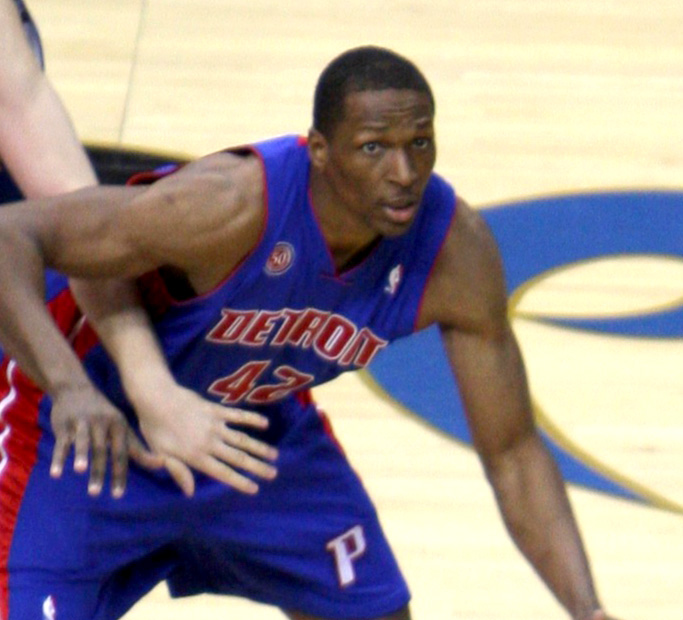
Theo Ratliff

- Josh Allen – football player, 2024 NFL MVP
- Gideon Ariel – athlete
- Rigo Beltrán – former Major League Baseball pitcher
- Charles Bradley – NBA basketball player
- Francis Chesley – NFL football player
- Darnell Clash – football player
- Derek Cooke – basketball player
- Hayden Dalton (born 1996) – basketball player
- Josh Davis – NBA basketball player
- Fennis Dembo – NBA basketball player
- Conrad Dobler –NFL player
- Lloyd Eaton – football coach
- Aaron Elling – football player
- Bob Fitzke – football player
- Malcom Floyd – NFL player
- Ted Gilmore – football coach
- Adam Goldberg – NFL football player
- Art Howe – MLB baseball player
- Jeff Huson – MLB baseball player
- Justin James – basketball player in the Israeli Basketball Premier League
- Korey Jones – football player
- Jim Kiick – football player
- Eric Leckner – basketball player
- Derrick Martin – football player
- Dale Memmelaar – NFL football player
- Angelo Mosca – football player, professional wrestler
- Larry Nance Jr. – NBA basketball player
- Jay Novacek – NFL football player
- Chuck Pagano – football coach
- John Pilch – former NBA player
- Chris Prosinski – NFL football player
- Bill Quayle – athletics director for Emporia State University 1979–1999
- Theo Ratliff – center for the Charlotte Bobcats of the NBA
- Jeron Roberts (born 1976) – American-Israeli basketball player
- Ken Sailors – inventor of the jump shot; former NBA player
- Justin Salas – wrestler
- Shakir Smith – basketball player
- Truett Smith – NFL football player
- Billie Sutton – professional bronc rider and candidate for governor of South Dakota
- Scott Usher – Olympic swimmer
- Scottie Vines – NFL football player
- Jack Weil – football player
- Justin Williams – basketball player
- Marcus Williams – basketball player in the Israeli Basketball Premier League
- Tony Windis – NBA basketball player

=== Arts & entertainment ===
- Steve Cochran – actor
- Harold Garde – artist
- Curt Gowdy – sportscaster
- Hazel Homer-Wambeam – beauty queen, Miss Wyoming 2022
- Karyl McBride – psychotherapist and author
- Rodger McDaniel – attorney, author, member of both houses of Wyoming legislature
- Blake Neubert – artist
- Wayde Preston – television actor
- Chancey Williams – country music singer/songwriter
- Penny Wolin – photographer
- Tak Chiu Wong – saxophonist

=== Politics ===
- Jim Anderson – politician
- Rodney Anderson – politician
- Eli Bebout – Wyoming state politician
- Lynn Birleffi – politician
- Douglas K. Bryant – politician
- Dick Cheney – 46th vice president of the United States
- Floyd Esquibel – politician
- Dave Freudenthal – former governor of Wyoming
- John Frullo – politician
- Clifford Hansen – politician
- Harry L. Harris – politician
- John J. Hickey – politician
- David N. Hitchcock – politician
- Daniel L. Kinnaman – politician
- Tom Lubnau – politician
- Cynthia Lummis – politician
- Leonard McEwan – former member of the Wyoming Supreme Court and the Fourth District Court in Sheridan
- M. Margaret McKeown – judge on the United States Court of Appeals for the Ninth Circuit
- Mary Mead – politician
- Matt Mead – politician
- Joseph B. Meyer – Wyoming attorney general and state treasurer
- Bob Nicholas – politician
- Owen Petersen – politician
- Alan K. Simpson – former U.S. senator
- Pete Simpson – former state representative, UW administrator and Hall of Fame member
- Gail D. Zimmerman – state legislator

=== Other ===
- Florence F. Arenberg (M.S. 1939) – botanist and educator
- Jillian Balow – Wyoming superintendent of public instruction, effective 2015
- Jerry Buss – businessman
- W. Edwards Deming – engineer and professor
- Floyd Dominy – Bureau of Reclamation commissioner 1959–1969
- Rick Edgeman – engineer and professor
- Gary E. Gibson – neuroscientist
- Gretchen Hofmann – professor of ecological physiology of marine organisms
- John A. List – economics professor
- Stephen Nicholas – physician
- Susan Pamerleau – sheriff
- Samuel C. Phillips – director of NASA's Apollo program from 1964–1969, director of the National Security Agency 1972–1973; commander of the Air Force Systems Command 1973–1975
- Ken Pomeroy – statistical specialist
- Peter J. Schoomaker – military general
- Marlan Scully – physicist
- Matthew Shepard – LGBT activist, murdered; did not graduate
- Carol Tomé – CEO of UPS
- James Watt – secretary of the Interior in the Reagan administration
- Alvin Wiederspahn (1949–2014) – Cheyenne lawyer, historical preservationist, rancher, and member of both houses of the Wyoming State Legislature
