= Gary E. Gibson =

American neuroscientist

- Scientific career
- Fields: Neuroscience, mitochondrial biology, neurodegeneration
- Workplaces: UCLA; Weill Cornell Medicine

Gary E. Gibson is an American neuroscientist specializing in mitochondrial biology and metabolic dysfunction related to neurodegeneration. He serves as the Lab Director of the Laboratory for Mitochondrial Biology and Metabolic Dysfunction in Neurodegeneration at the Burke Neurological Institute and holds the position of Professor of Neuroscience with tenure at the Brain and Mind Research Institute of Weill Cornell Medicine. He also served as associate director of the Dementia Research Service.

== Early life and education ==
Gibson earned his Bachelor of Science degree in Zoology and Chemistry from the University of Wyoming. He subsequently pursued a Ph.D. in Physiology with a focus on Biochemistry and Neuroscience at Cornell University. After completing his doctoral studies, he conducted postdoctoral research at the University of California, Los Angeles (UCLA). Following his postdoctoral work, he joined the faculty at UCLA before moving to Weill Cornell Medicine and the Burke Neurological Institute.

== Career ==
Gibson has made significant contributions to the understanding of mitochondrial function and metabolic dysfunction in age-related neurodegenerative diseases, including Alzheimer's, Parkinson's, and Huntington's diseases as well as stroke. His research investigates how abnormalities in the brain's use of oxygen and glucose lead to neurodegenerative diseases, with a focus on identifying therapeutic interventions.

Gibson and his team employ cellular (including stem cells and human fibroblasts) and animal models, as well as samples from human patients and isolated proteins to study the role of thiamine (vitamin B1), glucose, oxygen metabolism and mitochondria in brain function and to test potential drug therapies. His research revealed that post-translational modification of proteins by glucose metabolites lead to a broad range of functional/pathological changes.

Throughout his career, Gibson has been continuously funded by the National Institutes of Health (NIH) and has served on over 20 NIH review panels. He reviews grants for organizations such as the Alzheimer's Association, Alzheimer's Drug Discovery Foundation, and the American Federation for Aging Research.

== Awards and honors ==
Gibson was recognized with the American Society for Neurochemistry's Outstanding Young Investigator Award and has delivered lectures at many institutions. Notable presentations include the Dean's Hour at Cornell University Medical College, the NIH Director's Talk, and the Visek Lectureship at the University of Illinois.

== Professional affiliations and editorial work ==
Gibson is a member of the American Society for Neurochemistry (where he served as secretary in 2005–2006), the Society for Neuroscience, the International Society for Neurochemistry, the International Society for Cerebral Blood Flow and Metabolism, and the American Society for Nutrition. He holds three U.S. patents related to his research and has served on the editorial boards of numerous scientific journals, including Neurochemical Research, Neurochemical International (as Associate Editor), Journal of Neurochemistry, and Journal of Alzheimer's Disease.

== Research focus ==
Gibson's research primarily focuses on uncovering the underlying causes of neurodegenerative diseases and developing effective therapies. His work has shown that the inability of the brain to properly utilize oxygen and glucose may either cause or significantly contribute to these diseases. Abnormalities in glucose and oxygen metabolism are linked to altered calcium regulation and excessive free radical production, which can damage brain function. His research demonstrates that pharmacological thiamine is very beneficial in models of Alzheimer's and promising results in patients. His laboratory is currently investigating drugs that could prevent such damage and protect brain cells from degeneration.

Gibson has authored over 270 research papers and edited three books in the fields of neuroscience and neurochemistry, significantly advancing the understanding of mitochondrial dysfunction in neurodegenerative diseases. His results demonstrate that changes in metabolic processes link to pathology by modifying critical proteins (i.e., post-translational modifications).

== Selected publications ==
=== Edited volume ===
- Handbook of Neurochemistry and Molecular Biology. 3rd Edition Volume 5. 2007. Brain energetics Integration of molecular and cellular processes. Edited by Gary E. Gibson and Gerald Dienel. Springer Publishing 923 pages. The volume has 33 chapters from 87 contributors.

=== Research papers ===
- Bubber, Parvesh; Haroutunian, Vahram; Fisch, Gene; Blass, John P.; Gibson, Gary E. (May 2005). "Mitochondrial abnormalities in Alzheimer brain: mechanistic implications". Annals of Neurology. 57 (5): 695–703. doi:10.1002/ana.20474. ISSN 0364-5134. PMID 15852400.
- Karuppagounder, Saravanan S.; Pinto, John T.; Xu, Hui; Chen, Huan-Lian; Beal, M. Flint; Gibson, Gary E. (February 2009). "Dietary supplementation with resveratrol reduces plaque pathology in a transgenic model of Alzheimer's disease". Neurochemistry International. 54 (2): 111–118. doi:10.1016/j.neuint.2008.10.008. ISSN 0197-0186. PMC 2892907. PMID 19041676.
- Blass, J. P.; Gibson, G. E. (22 December 1977). "Abnormality of a thiamine-requiring enzyme in patients with Wernicke-Korsakoff syndrome". The New England Journal of Medicine. 297 (25): 1367–1370. doi:10.1056/NEJM197712222972503. ISSN 0028-4793. PMID 927453.
- Gibson, G. E.; Sheu, K. F.; Blass, J. P.; Baker, A.; Carlson, K. C.; Harding, B.; Perrino, P. (August 1988). "Reduced activities of thiamine-dependent enzymes in the brains and peripheral tissues of patients with Alzheimer's disease". Archives of Neurology. 45 (8): 836–840. doi:10.1001/archneur.1988.00520320022009. ISSN 0003-9942. PMID 3395256.
- Gibson, G. E.; Peterson, C. (1987). "Calcium and the aging nervous system". Neurobiology of Aging. 8 (4): 329–343. doi:10.1016/0197-4580(87)90072-8. ISSN 0197-4580. PMID 3306433.
- Yang, Yun; Tapias, Victor; Acosta, Diana; Xu, Hui; Chen, Huanlian; Bhawal, Ruchika; Anderson, Elizabeth T.; Ivanova, Elena; Lin, Hening; Sagdullaev, Botir T.; Chen, Jianer; Klein, William L.; Viola, Kirsten L.; Gandy, Sam; Haroutunian, Vahram; Beal, M. Flint; Eliezer, David; Zhang, Sheng; Gibson, Gary E. (10 January 2022). "Altered succinylation of mitochondrial proteins, APP and tau in Alzheimer's disease". Nature Communications. 13 (1): 159. Bibcode:2022NatCo..13..159Y. doi:10.1038/s41467-021-27572-2. ISSN 2041-1723. PMC 8748865. PMID 35013160.
