= Juan Pedro Bolaños =

Spanish researcher

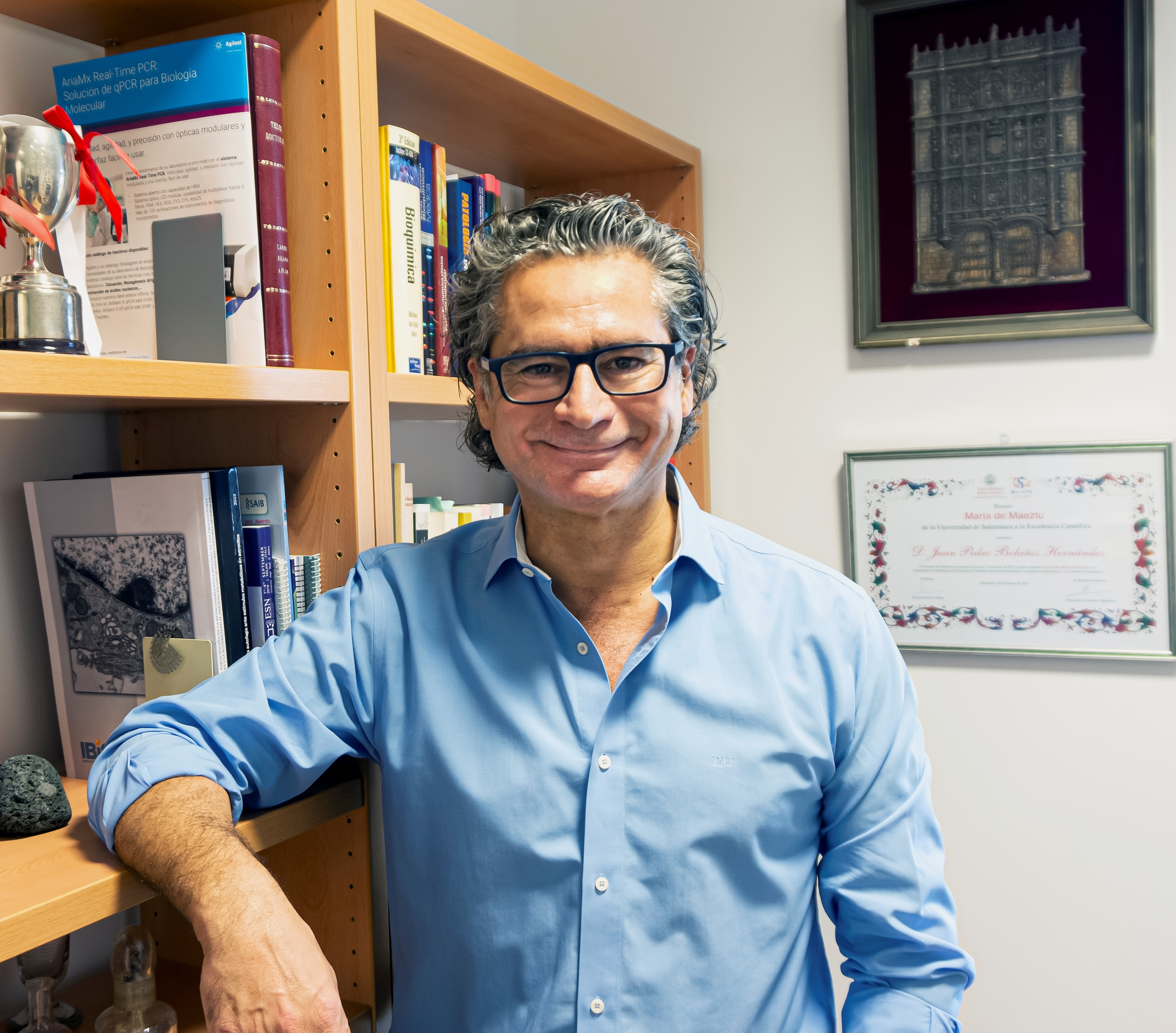
- Born: Juan Pedro Bolaños Hernández; April 18, 1964 (age 62); Santa María de Guía de Gran Canaria, Las Palmas
- Education: University of Salamanca
- Occupations: Professor of Biochemistry and Molecular Biology Neuroscience Researcher
- Employer: University of Salamanca
- Awards: Marie Curie Excellence Award Premio Castilla y León de Investigación Científica y Técnica e Innovación Bachelard Lectureship Award

Juan Pedro Bolaños Hernández (born April 18, 1964, Santa María de Guía de Gran Canaria, Las Palmas) is a biochemist and neuroscientist specializing in neuroenergetics and metabolism. He is a professor of Biochemistry and Molecular Biology at the University of Salamanca. His investigation focuses on the understanding of molecular mechanisms that regulate the metabolism and redox homeostasis in the cells of the central nervous system. He has received several recognitions throughout his scientific career. Among them is the Premio Castilla y León de Investigación Científica y Técnica e Innovación (Award Castilla y León for Scientific and Technical Research and Innovation).

== Professional career ==
He comes from a family of pharmacists. During his childhood, he helped his father with some tasks in his laboratory of clinical analyses in his local town. It was here where he began being interested in chemistry, applied to biology, and eventually to the pharmaceutical sciences.

He studied Pharmaceutical Sciences at the University of Salamanca, where he graduated with honors in 1987. Later he obtained a doctorate at the same university under the tutelage of Dr. José Mª Medina Jiménez. During his PhD, he did a research internship in Oxford, England, where he worked in the Metabolic Research Laboratory under the supervision of Dereck Williamson. In 1992 he defended his PhD thesis on the metabolism of valproic acid in the central nervous system, graduating with honors that same year. After his PhD he worked as a postdoctoral fellow from 1993 to 1995 at the Institute of Neurology of the University College of London as a Marie Curie scholar.

In 1996 he became a professor in the Department of Biochemistry and Molecular Biology at the University of Salamanca. A year later, in 1997 he established his own research group and started working on a project funded by the Ministry of Science and Technology. From 1997 to 2004 he acted as Academic Secretary in the Department of Biochemistry and Molecular Biology. He completed the national professorship habilitation test in 2005, and in 2007 he was incorporated as a full professor at the University of Salamanca.

He has participated in committees of organization and direction of different research conferences and scientific events. In 2017 together with Gilles Bonvento, they organized a symposium on redox and metabolic interactions between neurons and astrocytes. In 2022 together with Giovanni Mariscano and Anne-Karine Bouzier-Sore directed the course Bioenergetics for Brain Functions as part of the Cajal Advanced Neuroscience Training Programme. During that same year, he directed the summer school of the International Society of Neurochemistry and the Journal of Neurochemistry under the theme of Cerebral Metabolism in Health and Disease.

== Research ==
His research group is located at the Institute of Functional and Genomic Biology, a mixed center University of Salamanca, and the Spanish National Research Council. It is recognized as a Group of Excellence of Castilla y León. The group has research collaborations with research centers at national and international levels, among which the University Hospital of Salamanca, University College London, and the Institute of Health Saint Carlos III.

His research focuses on understanding the molecular mechanisms that regulate the metabolism and redox homeostasis in the cells of the central nervous system. In particular, the study of the proteins and signaling pathways responsible for the adaptation of the neural metabolism at high energy demands and antioxidants imposed by neurotransmission. Among the research aims of his teamwork, besides the advancement of knowledge, is to identify metabolic targets and genetic alterations that contribute to the malfunctioning of neurotransmission that neurological problems, including neurodegenerative diseases, and even contribute to aging. To attain it, they have a research project consisting of the validation of the protein phosphatase 2c(pp2c) in psychotic states and to tackle the disorder by consumption of cannabis. Furthermore, they evaluate the pharmacological potential of neuroprotective compounds in the treatment of Parkinson's disease and Alzheimer's disease. Another of his research lines consists of the metabolic rescheduling of the astrocytes and their impact on neural function.

== Awards and recognitions ==
His educational work, research, and academic pathway, have been recognized and awarded in multiple occasions by national and international organizations.

- 2005: Marie Curie Excellence Award. Awarded by the European Commission in recognition of his research work.
- 2008 to 2011: Recognition as editor of the year of the scientific journal Biochemical Journal.
- 2019: Prize María de Maeztu of scientific excellence. Awarded by the University of Salamanca.
- 2021: A homage by the scientific magazine Neurochemical Research standing out his academic and scientific career.
- 2021: Premio Castilla y León de Investigación Científica y Técnica e Innovación. In recognition of his scientific publications, international collaborations, and his projection of a future as an ambassador of science in Castilla y León.
- 2022: Bachelard Lectureship Award. Awarded by the European Society for Neurochemistry for the lecture entitled Metabolic shapes of brain cells and functional consequences.

=== Scientific societies ===
He has been an active member of several scientific societies, holding both membership and leadership positions. He served as President of the European Society for Neurochemistry (ESN) from 2011 to 2013. He is also a member of the International Society for Neurochemistry (ISN), where he directed a summer school in 2022 organized by the society in collaboration the Journal of Neurochemistry. In addition, he served as Consul of the Spanish Society of Biochemistry and Molecular Biology (SEBBM) and served as coordinator of the molecular neurobiology group during 2007 to 2010.

== Scientific production ==
Throughout his career in academia, he has supervised multiple national and international students and directed their doctoral theses, some of which have received European distinction. He has authored more than 150 scientific articles in high-impact academic journals. He has served as an editor in multiple international scientific journals such as Science, PNAS, Nature Communications, Nature Reviews Neuroscience, and Cell Metabolism. In 2021, the journal Neurochemical Research dedicated a special issue to research areas related to his scientific contributions in recognition of his academic career. Furthermore, he has participated in review panels and advisory boards for international organizations such as the Human Frontier Program Organization (HFSP), the Research Foundation Flanders (FWO), Wellcome Trust, Parkinson's UK, and the Michael J. Fox Foundation.

Among his scientific publications, the following works stand out as the most highly cited and relevant according to the Scopus database.

- Requejo-Aguilar, Raquel; Lopez-Fabuel, Irene; Fernandez, Emilio; Martinis, Luis M; Almeida, Angeles; Bolaños, Juan P (2014). "PINK1 deficiency sustains cell proliferation by reprogramming glucose metabolism through HIF1". Nature Communications. 5 (1): 4514.
- Vicente-Gutierrez, Carlos; Bonora, Nicoló; Bob-Jimenez, Verónica; Jimenez-Blasco, Daniel; et, al; Bolaños, Juan P (2019). "Astrocytic mitochondrial ROS modulate brain metabolism and mouse behaviour". Nature Metabolism. 1: 201–211.
- López-Fabuel, Irene; Garcia-Macia, Marina; Buondelmonte, Constantina; Burmistrova, Olga; Bonora, Nicolo; et, al; Bolaños, Juan P (27 January 2022). "Aberrant upregulation of the glycolytic enzyme PFKFB3 in CLN7 neuronal ceroid lipofuscinosis". Nature Communications. 13 (356).
- Jimenez-Blasco, Daniel; Busquets-Garcia, Arnau; Hebert-Chatelain, Etienne; Serrat, Roman; Vicente-Gutierrez, Carlos; et, al; Bolaños, Juan P (8 July 2020). "Glucose metabolism links astroglial mitochondria to cannabinoid effects". Nature. 583: 603–608.
- Burmistrova, Olga; Olias-Arjona, Ana; Lepresa, Rebeca; Jimenez-Blasco, Daniel; et, al; Bolaños, Juan P (12 August 2019). "Targeting PFKFB3 alleviates cerebral ischemia-reperfusion injury in mice". Scientific Reports. 9 (11670).
- Herrero-Mendez, Angel; Almeida, Angeles; Fernández, Emilio; Maestre, Carolina; Moncada, Salvador; Bolaños, Juan P (17 May 2009). "The bioenergetic and antioxidant status of neurons is controlled by continuous degradation of a key glycolytic enzyme by APC/C–Cdh1". Nature Cell Biology. 11: 747–752.
