= Marjorie Lees =

American neuroscientist and academic

Marjorie Berman Lees
- Born: 1923; New York City
- Died: January 18, 2012 (aged 88–89)
- Education: Hunter College; Radcliffe College; University of Chicago
- Scientific career
- Workplaces: Harvard Medical School; Geisel School of Medicine
- Thesis: A study of brain "lipide" sulfur (1951)
- Doctoral advisor: Jordi Folch Pi

Marjorie Berman Lees (1923–2012) was an American neuroscientist who was emeritus professor of biological chemistry at Harvard Medical School. Her research considered neurobiology and biochemistry. She was the first to identify the Folch-Lees proteolipid. She served as president of the American Society for Neurochemistry in 1983.

== Early life and education ==
Lees was born in New York City and was educated in the New York Public School System. She attended Hunter High School, where she credited her physics and chemistry teacher with her enthusiasm for science. She was an undergraduate student at Hunter College, where she was introduced to neuroscience and the nervous system of the Xenopus. Lees enrolled in a master's course at the University of Chicago, where she investigated the brains of fish. She was particularly interested in the regions that gave rise to their light-seeking behavior. She obtained her master's towards the end of World War II, and met a soldier returning from war who later became her husband. She joined the group of David Nachmansohn, where she worked on choline acetyltransferase and identified the presence of Coenzyme A, a small, heat-stable organic molecule.

Her husband was admitted to an aeronautical engineering graduate program at Massachusetts Institute of Technology, and Lees eventually joined the lab of Jordi Folch Pi at Harvard Medical School. She secured funding from the National Institutes of Health and investigated sulfatides. During her doctoral research, Lees identified that it was possible to extract sulfatide using chloroform. and that extracts of sulfatide including a protein. She measured the amount of this protein by determining the amount of ammonia using Van Slyke determination. The protein later became known as the Folch-Lees proteolipid.

== Research and career ==
Lees started her independent academic career at the Geisel School of Medicine (then Dartmouth Medical College), where she continued to study lipid isolation and to develop quantitative extraction strategies. She eventually returned to Harvard Medical School, where she established a laboratory at the Eunice Kennedy Shriver National Institute of Child Health and Human Development. She was made Director of the department.

Proteolipids, such as the Folch-Lees proteolipid identified by Lees, are critical constituents of cell membranes. They are generally involved with ion channel activity and cellular processes. Lees analyzed the conditions for the electrophoretic analysis of the Folch-Lees proteolipid and developed a strategy to isolate the Folch-Lees proteolipid. She used antibodies raised against Folch-Lees proteolipid to study the membrane topology of Folch-Lees proteolipids.

Alongside her work on proteolipids, Lees studied myelin, the fatty substance that surrounds the axons of nerves. She argued that dynamic interactions within myelin were responsible for its function. She studied myelin proteins, and identified Na⁺/K⁺-ATPase as a myelin protein.

== Academic service ==
At Harvard Medical School, Lees developed courses on the biochemistry and neurobiology of intellectual disability. Alongside her scientific research, Lees was committed to improving the recognition and representation of women in neurochemistry. Lees was the first woman to be made president of the American Society for Neurochemistry, in 1983. In 1985 she became the first Harvard DMS (Division of Medical Sciences) Ph.D. woman made full professor at Harvard.

== Selected publications ==
- L B Nicholson; Judith M Greer; R A Sobel; M B Lees; V K Kuchroo (October 1, 1995). "An altered peptide ligand mediates immune deviation and prevents autoimmune encephalomyelitis". Immunity. 3 (4): 397–405. doi:10.1016/1074-7613(95)90169-8. ISSN 1074-7613. PMID 7584131. Wikidata Q63535314.
- M. B. Lees; S. Paxman (May 1, 1972). "Modification of the lowry procedure for the analysis of proteolipid protein". Analytical Biochemistry. 47 (1): 184–192. doi:10.1016/0003-2697(72)90291-6. ISSN 0003-2697. PMID 5031110. Wikidata Q48768718.
- H. H. Hess; M. B. Lees; J. E. Derr (March 1, 1978). "A linear Lowry-Folin assay for both water-soluble and sodium dodecyl sulfate-solubilized proteins". Analytical Biochemistry. 85 (1): 295–300. doi:10.1016/0003-2697(78)90304-4. ISSN 0003-2697. PMID 629390. Wikidata Q43867307.

== Personal life ==
Lees had three children. She died on January 18, 2012, following a long illness.
