= Rolf Gruetter =

Swiss physicist specialized in magnetic resonance

Professor Rolf Gruetter
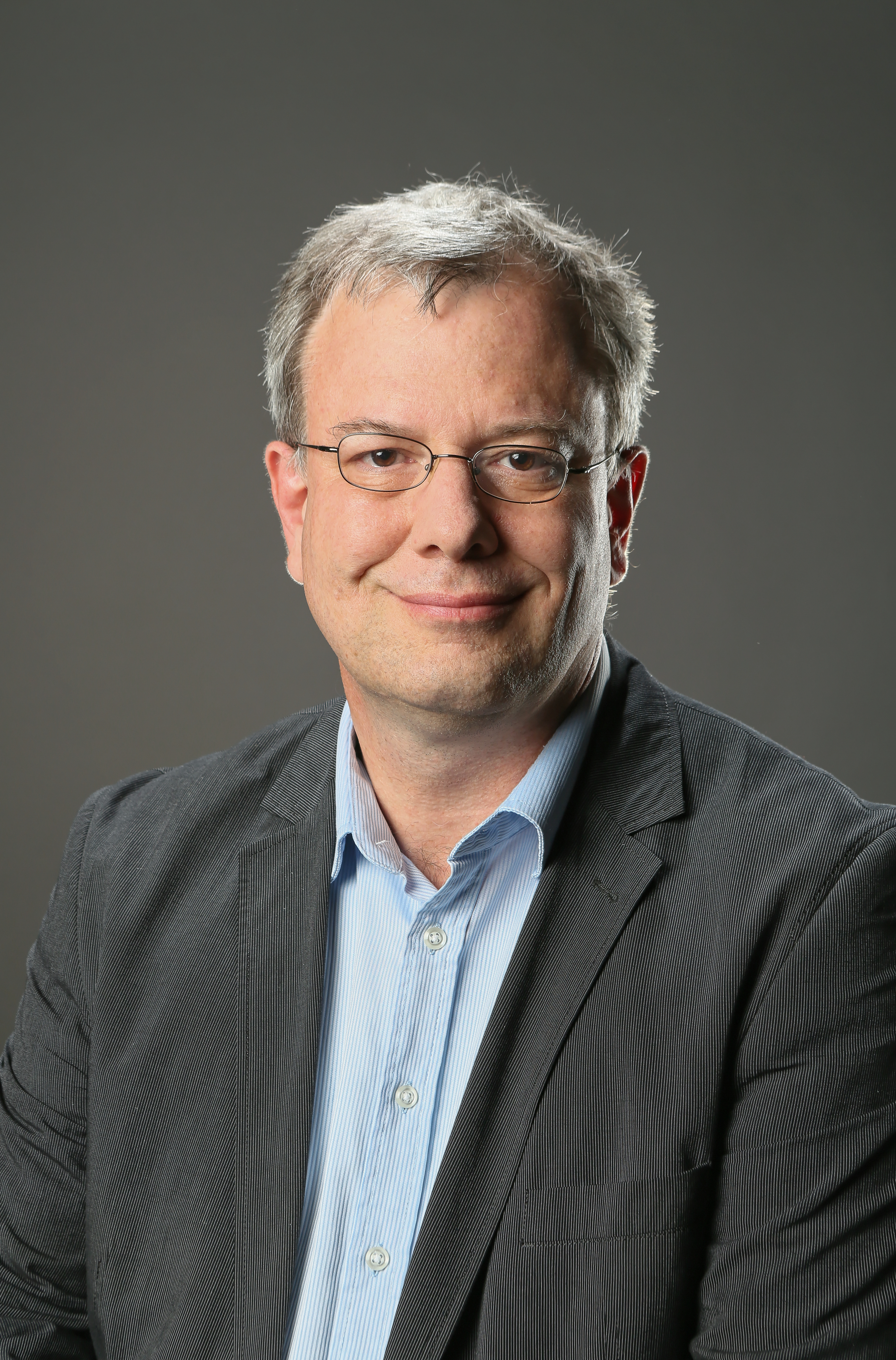
- Rolf Gruetter in 2014
- Born: 1962 (age 63–64); Geneva
- Citizenship: Swiss
- Known for: Fast shimming techniques Spectroscopy methods Ultra-high magnetic fields in magnetic resonance Neuro-glial metabolism
- Awards: Young Investigator Award Plenary Lecture (ISN, 1999)

Academic background
- Education: Physics
- Alma mater: ETH Zurich
- Thesis: Methodische Aspekte der in vivo ^{31}Phosphor-Kernspinresonanz-Spektroskopie in der pädiatrischen Diagnostik (1990)
- Doctoral advisor: Kurt Wüthrich; Richard R. Ernst
- Other advisor: Robert G. Shulman

Academic work
- Discipline: Physics
- Sub-discipline: Spectroscopy; Neuroimaging
- Institutions: EPFL (École Polytechnique Fédérale de Lausanne)
- Main interests: Biomedical imaging Spectroscopy; Spin physics Brain metabolism
- Website: https://www.epfl.ch/labs/lifmet/

Rolf Gruetter (born 1962 in Geneva) is a Swiss physicist and neurobiologist specialized in magnetic resonance, biomedical imaging and brain metabolism. He is a professor of physics at EPFL (École Polytechnique Fédérale de Lausanne) and the head of the Laboratory Functional and Metabolic Imaging at the School of Basic Sciences.

== Career ==
Gruetter studied as an undergraduate experimental physics at ETH Zurich, before joining the laboratory of Kurt Wüthrich as a PhD student. He graduated in 1990 with a thesis on "Methodische Aspekte der in vivo ^{31}Phosphor-Kernspinresonanz-Spektroskopie in der pädiatrischen Diagnostik" that was next to Wüthrich also supervised by Richard R. Ernst. In 1992, he went to work with Robert G. Shulman at Yale University as postdoctoral fellow. Following postdoctoral studies with Chris Boesch at the University of Bern, he became in 1994 first an assistant professor at the University of Minnesota's Center for Magnetic Resonance Research, and was promoted in 2003 to the position of a full professor.

Since 2005 he has been full professor at EPFL and the head of the Laboratory for functional and metabolic imaging at the School of Basic Sciences.

Until 2019 he was the director of the Center for Biomedical Imaging.

== Research ==
Gruetter's research aims at bridging science, and biomedical applications and solutions, by working in a trans-disciplinary manner on magnetic resonance, neurochemistry and diabetes research. His research targets the development of fast shimming techniques and spectroscopy methods at ultra-high magnetic fields in magnetic resonance, and their application in biomedical settings, such as the non-invasive characterization of the metabolism of neural glia cells in both rodent models and humans.

Gruetter contributed to the advancement in magnetic resonance physics and engineering by showing the advantage of higher magnetic fields. His involvement in that field led among others to a fast field mapping method that has proved crucial for the demonstration of the advantage of high magnetic fields for in vivo investigation, and that has found application in several commercial scanners used to correct for susceptibility-induced B0-related distortions; to enable the simultaneous measurement of more than 20 compounds in the brain and thereby allowed for the establishment of neurochemical profiles; and to the creation of mathematical model of brain metabolism encompassing quantitative metabolic rates in the live brain.

More specifically, his contributions led to the direct measurement of brain glucose levels in human brain over time; to the in vivo measurement of glutamine synthesis in brain and the measurement of the antioxidants; to the diagnosis and quantification of glutathione and vitamin C in the brain; and to the in vivo mensuration of brain glycogen metabolism and content.

Through these measurements Gruetter was able to quantify the substantial metabolic in vivo flux of glutamate neurotransmission; to demonstrate in vivo via CO_{2} fixation that the anaplerotic metabolism in the brain is both important and quantitatively substantial; to prove that brain glycogen is available in substantial amounts as a relevant emergency energy reservoir in condition of glucose-deprivation, such as hypoglycemia, which is an important complication in diabetes; and to establish that astrocyte energy metabolism is substantial and that Atp synthesis predominantly occurs by oxidative metabolism.

== Distinctions ==
Gruetter is a member of the International Society for Magnetic Resonance in Medicine (senior fellow since 2014), the European Society for Magnetic Resonance in Medicine and Biology (fellow since 2011), and the International Society for Neurochemistry.

He is the recipient of the 1999 Young Investigator Award Plenary Lecture by the International Society for Neurochemistry.

== Selected works ==
- Gruetter, Rolf (1993). "Automatic, localizedin Vivo adjustment of all first-and second-order shim coils". Magnetic Resonance in Medicine. 29 (6): 804–811. doi:10.1002/mrm.1910290613. PMID 8350724. S2CID 41112243.
- Tkáč, I.; Starčuk, Z.; Choi, I.-Y.; Gruetter, R. (1999). "In vivo1H NMR spectroscopy of rat brain at 1 ms echo time". Magnetic Resonance in Medicine. 41 (4): 649–656. doi:10.1002/(SICI)1522-2594(199904)41:4<649::AID-MRM2>3.0.CO;2-G. PMID 10332839. S2CID 12224754.
- Mescher, M.; Merkle, H.; Kirsch, J.; Garwood, M.; Gruetter, R. (1998). "Simultaneousin vivo spectral editing and water suppression". NMR in Biomedicine. 11 (6): 266–272. doi:10.1002/(SICI)1099-1492(199810)11:6<266::AID-NBM530>3.0.CO;2-J. PMID 9802468. S2CID 13071914.
- Pfeuffer, Josef; Tkáč, Ivan; Provencher, Stephen W.; Gruetter, Rolf (1999). "Toward an in Vivo Neurochemical Profile: Quantification of 18 Metabolites in Short-Echo-Time 1H NMR Spectra of the Rat Brain". Journal of Magnetic Resonance. 141 (1): 104–120. Bibcode:1999JMagR.141..104P. doi:10.1006/jmre.1999.1895. hdl:11858/00-001M-0000-0012-FBD9-6. PMID 10527748.
- Gruetter, Rolf; Seaquist, Elizabeth R.; Ugurbil, Kâmil (2001). "A mathematical model of compartmentalized neurotransmitter metabolism in the human brain" (PDF). American Journal of Physiology. Endocrinology and Metabolism. 281 (1): E100–E112. doi:10.1152/ajpendo.2001.281.1.E100. PMID 11404227. S2CID 10710263.
- Tkáč, Ivan; Andersen, Peter; Adriany, Gregor; Merkle, Hellmut; Uǧurbil, Kâmil; Gruetter, Rolf (2001). "In vivo1H NMR spectroscopy of the human brain at 7 T". Magnetic Resonance in Medicine. 46 (3): 451–456. doi:10.1002/mrm.1213. PMID 11550235. S2CID 14552368.
- Choi, In-Young; Gruetter, Rolf (8 March 2012). Neural Metabolism in Vivo. ISBN 978-1-4614-1788-0.
