= Jordi Folch Pi =

Catalan biochemist (1911–1979)

- Born: March 25, 1911; Barcelona, Spain
- Died: October 3, 1979 (aged 68); Boston, Massachusetts
- Education: University of Barcelona, Spain
- Known for: Isolation of brain signaling lipids with the Folch technique
- Scientific career
- Fields: Biochemistry, Neurochemistry
- Workplaces: Harvard
- Doctoral students: Marjorie Lees

Jordi Folch Pi (March 25, 1911 – October 3, 1979) was a Spanish biochemist at Harvard University (McLean Hospital) who was recognized universally as one of the founders of the field of structural chemistry of complex lipids and as a leader in the development of neurochemistry as a distinct discipline within the neurosciences.

== Early life ==
Folch was born in Barcelona, Spain. His father, Rafel Folch, was a lawyer and a Catalan poet, and his mother, Maria Pi, a teacher. Folch went to high school at the Lycée Français of Barcelona, from which he graduated in 1927. He went on to study medicine, receiving an M.D. degree from the University of Barcelona Medical school in 1932.

== Early career ==
Folch's clinical training at university included a period as an intern in the surgical clinic of Dr. Antoni Trias and as the sole physician in Almedret, a small Catalan village of 800 people. Folch had the opportunity to study at the Institute of Physiology in Barcelona, an institute dedicated to carrying out basic research using contemporary methods and ideas and was founded by Jesus Maria Bellido and Folch's uncle August Pi Sunyer. He worked as an assistant to his cousin Cesar Pi Sunyer and by the time he received his M.D. degree, they had jointly published four papers on glycogen synthesis in three different languages (German, French, and Spanish). Folch also studied blood glucose and lactic acid metabolism under the direction of the man he considered his scientific mentor, Professor Rosend Carrasco Formiguera. Folch's experiences at the Institute of Physiology intensified his interest in physiology and in clinical questions, particularly as they related to metabolic problems. Thanks to Carrasco's contacts, Francisco Duran Reynals, a biochemist at the Rockefeller Institute in New York, became interested in Folch and arranged for him to come to that institution as a volunteer.

In 1936, just before the Spanish Civil War broke out, he was accepted as a research fellow at the Rockefeller Institute in New York, and he took the post. At the insistence of his family (who had fought for the defeated Republican side—his brother Albert and sister Nuria had to exile into Mexico and his other brother Frederic spent a few months in prison after returning from exile in France), he decided to stay in the United States after the Civil War ended.

== Move to United States ==
Folch arrived at the Rockefeller in 1936 as a volunteer assistant. The following year he obtained a formal position as an assistant and later as an associate on the scientific staff of the Hospital of the Rockefeller Institute for Medical Research in Donald Van Slyke’s department. Folch’s first assignment at the Rockefeller Institute was a project with Dr. Irvine Page on pituitary hormone disturbances. Folch's role was to analyze plasma lipids in these disorders. He soon realized that the commonly used extraction of lipids with petroleum ether had problems in that the extraction was not quantitative and the extract contained non-lipid contaminants. He then devised a procedure that involved precipitation of lipids and proteins with colloidal iron and removal of most of the non-lipid components with water, which solved the contamination problem.

During these first investigations he co-signed a paper with Donald Van Slyke on an improved manometric method for carbon analysis. Using this newly developed method, he characterized the isolated "cephalin" fraction from brain tissue that after Johannes Thudichum (the nineteenth-century founder of the field of structural neurochemistry) was considered as pure phosphatidyl ethanolamine. Folch showed that the amount of carbon and of amines were not consistent with Thudichum's formula. This research led to Folch's first publication on brain lipids in 1941 and was followed over a period of several years by a series of famous papers showing that cephalin was not a single lipid but rather a mixture of three lipids (phosphatidyl ethanolamine, phosphatidyl serine, and inositol). Folch was the first to have elucidated the structure of phosphatidyl serine. Furthermore, he isolated subsequently mono-, di- and triphosphoinositides.

In 1944, Folch was appointed director of the new Biological Research Laboratory at the McLean Hospital (a division of Massachusetts General Hospital) and assistant professor of biological chemistry at Harvard Medical School to develop a program in Neuroscience. His fundamental philosophy was that, to understand the structural chemistry of the brain, it was necessary to identify all brain components. In 1947 he was joined by Marjorie Lees, together they developed mild procedures for quantitative extraction of brain lipids leading to the classic method using a chloroform-methanol mixture and a phase partition with water which resulted in quantitative extraction of tissue lipids and removal of water-soluble contaminants. This method became one of the most highly cited papers of the 1950s and in 2014 was featured no. 9 in a list of the most highly cited papers in the history of Science. The technique he developed for purifying the brain lipids is still referred to as "Folching" and is one of the most cited papers in the history of biochemistry. Folch solution is a solution containing chloroform and methanol, usually in a 2:1 (vol/vol) ratio. One of its uses is in separating polar from nonpolar compounds, for example separating nonpolar lipids from polar proteins and carbohydrates in blood serum. More modernly, citations have diminished likely due to the incorporation of the technique into the common English vocabulary as the verb "To Folch" to describe Folch's technique for extracting tissue.

Folch successfully used his method to examine changes in brain lipids and proteins during development or diseases. Together with Lees they used their method to discover myelin proteolipid (defined as a new type of lipoprotein) in white matter and water-soluble glycolipids (named strandin at that time but now recognized as gangliosides) in gray matter. Until the end of his career, the characterization of proteolipids was a major focus of Folch's work and interest. The Folch's isolation procedure provided the basis for later studies of acylated proteins and gangliosides.

Folch is considered to be one of the founders of the chemistry of complex lipids and correlatively as well as a leader in the development of neurochemistry. He was one of the founders of the American Society for Neurochemistry and of the International Society for Neurochemistry. In 1956, Folch became the first Professor of Neurochemistry at Harvard Academy of Arts and Sciences. In 1978, he was elected to the United States National Academy of Sciences. He was also honorary professor in the Faculty of Medicine at the University of Barcelona, and was awarded honorary degrees by the University of Montpellier, France, and by the University of Chile, Santiago. After his retirement in 1977, he was Professor of Neurochemistry Emeritus and continued to be active as honorary biochemist at McLean Hospital until his death.

== Name ==
His last name is often seen hyphenated ("Folch-Pi"). In the Spanish tradition of providing two identifiers, he often signed with both his paternal and his maternal last names. When he moved to America and married, he decided to hyphenate his paternal and maternal last names, so that his children would bear his full family heritage: "Folch-Pi". His last names are often mispronounced "Foltsch Pie" or "Folk Pie" but the correct Catalan pronunciation is "Folk Pea".

== Personal life ==
In 1945, Folch married Willa Babcock, a manuscript curator at the Francis Countway Medical Library who would later become the academic dean of Tufts University. The couple had three children. Folch died in Boston, Massachusetts on October 3, 1979, at 68 years of age.

== Awards and honors ==
- Member of the American Academy of Arts and Sciences (1956).
- Member of the United States National Academy of Sciences (1978).
- Honorary professorship by the Faculty of Medicine of the University of Barcelona (Spain).
- Honorary degree by the University of Montpelier (France).
- Honorary degree by the University of Chile, Santiago (Chile).
- Medal as honorary councilor of CSIC (Supreme National Council for Scientific Research, Spain).
