= Herman S. Bachelard =

British neurochemist

Herman S Bachelard
- Born: Melbourne, Australia
- Education: Monash University
- Known for: Brain chemistry, brain metabolism
- Scientific career
- Fields: Neurochemistry, Neurosciences
- Workplaces: Institute of Psychiatry, University of London, UK

Herman Stanton Bachelard (1929 – 12 September 2006) was a British neurochemist, editor-in-chief and neuroscience book writer. He was born in Melbourne, Australia, and gained his BSc in Chemistry and Microbiology from Melbourne University in 1951, achieving an MSc and PhD in Biochemistry at Monash University. He developed most of his academic career in the United Kingdom, where Professor Bachelard headed the Departments of Biochemistry of the University of Bath and St Thomas' Hospital King's College London School of Medicine, concluding his career as Emeritus Professor of Physics at the University of Nottingham.

== Academic career ==
In 1966 he took-up a permanent academic post at the Institute of Psychiatry under the leadership of Professor Henry McIlwain, with whom Bachelard eventually culminated in joint authorship the classic text "Biochemistry and the Central Nervous System" Bachelard's books also included "Brain Biochemistry" and "Magnetic Resonance Spectroscopy and Imaging in Neurochemistry.", and -as a co-editor- also "Neurochemistry : a practical approach" In 1975 Herman was appointed to the Chair of Biochemistry in the University of Bath, and in 1979 undertook the Chair of Biochemistry at St. Thomas's Medical School, London. He was Chief Editor (Eastern Hemisphere) of the Journal of Neurochemistry for five years, and also acted as the founding Secretary of the European Society for Neurochemistry from 1976 until 1980 when he became its President and held that post until 1984.
Having developed an interest in non-invasive approaches to study brain metabolism Herman moved to Nottingham (UK), firstly as an external user at the newly formed MRC Biomedical NMR Centre at the National Institute for Medical Research, and then, in 1991, as a Research Professor in Residence at the Department of Physics of the University of Nottingham, from where he eventually retired in 1996.

== Research ==
Most of Bachelard's research had the regulation of energy metabolism in the brain as a central theme, and involved invasive techniques in experimental animal preparations ranging from purified glycolytic-enzymes to tissue-homogenates, synaptosomes, brain slices and even anaesthetized live-animals. Much of this work emphasized the brain's critical dependence on the availability of circulating glucose and oxygen, unveiling details of the molecular mechanisms involved in the regulation of carbohydrate metabolic pathways in the brain. During his later years in Nottingham Bachelard participated actively in pioneerering studies in human volunteers on the application of "13-C In vivo magnetic resonance spectroscopy" to estimate glucose-oxidation metabolic rates in visual cortex during intense light-stimulation. A comprehensive list of most of his research articles can be found here
