= Seyfried =

Seyfried is a surname of German-Jewish origin and roughly translates to 'peaceful victory'. Notable persons with that surname include:

- Alois Seyfried (1856–1938) Austro-Hungarian executioner
- Amanda Seyfried (born 1985), American actress
- David Seyfried-Herbert, 19th Baron Herbert (born 1952), British peer
- Gerhard Seyfried (born 1948), German comic artist, cartoonist, and writer
- Gordon Seyfried (born 1937), American Major League Baseball pitcher
- Ignaz von Seyfried (1776–1841), Austrian musician, conductor and composer
- Josef Seyfried (1895–1956), Czech equestrian
- Thomas Garcia Seyfried (born 1994), French footballer
- Thomas N. Seyfried, American professor of biology, genetics, and biochemistry.
- Vincent F. Seyfried (1918–2012), American historian

== See also ==
- Seifried Helbling
