= Thomas N. Seyfried =

American biologist (born 1946)

Thomas Seyfried
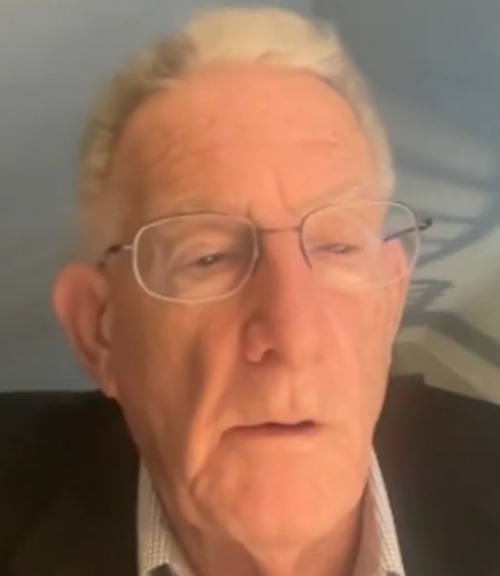
- Seyfried in 2025
- Education: University of New England (BS); Illinois State University (MS); University of Illinois, Urbana-Champaign (PhD)

Thomas N. Seyfried (born 1946) is an American professor of biology, genetics, and biochemistry at Boston College.

== Education and early life ==
His father, William E. Seyfried, Sr., served in the United States Merchant Marine during World War II and was president and founder of Capeway Paints in Brockton, Massachusetts. His brother William E. Seyfried, Jr. is a University of Minnesota professor in the Department of Earth and Environmental Sciences. Seyfried served in the United States Army during the Vietnam War, receiving the Bronze Star, the Air Medal, and the Army Commendation Medal.

Seyfried received his PhD in genetics and neurochemistry from the University of Illinois Urbana-Champaign in 1976. His postdoctoral fellowship studies were in the Department of Neurology at the Yale University School of Medicine where he served as an assistant professor in neurology. He did undergraduate work at St. Francis College in Brooklyn, NY (United States), and received a master's degree in genetics from Illinois State University, Normal.

== Career and Research ==
Seyfried's research focuses on mechanisms of chronic diseases such as cancer, epilepsy, neurodegenerative lipid storage diseases, and caloric restriction diets. He is known for his 2012 book Cancer as a Metabolic Disease: On the Origin, Management, and Prevention of Cancer. Some of his papers, "Cancer as a metabolic disease" (2010) and "On the origin of cancer metastasis" (2013) have been extensively cited in the academic literature.

Seyfried is a popular interview guest where he is a proponent of the metabolic theory of cancer. Seyfried proposes using the ketogenic diet in combination with other therapies such as glutamine inhibition in what he calls press/pulse therapy, for the treatment of certain cancers such as glioblastoma. While other medical researchers conclude there is insufficient evidence that ketogenic diets are effective treatments for cancer, ketogenic diets remain an area of active research; there are ongoing clinical trials evaluating the ketogenic diet in combination with the standard of care.

Seyfried has expressed criticism of radiation therapy and chemotherapy, which he has compared to "medieval" treatments. However, in his peer-reviewed scientific publications, Seyfried has implemented ketogenic metabolic therapy as adjuvant therapy to standard of care, dose-adjusted chemotherapy and radiation.

Seyfried is a senior editor for the ASN Neuro journal, and is on the board of editors for Neurochemical Research, Nutrition & Metabolism, and the Journal of Lipid Research. He previously served as chair of the Scientific Advisory Committee for the National Tay-Sachs and Allied Diseases Association.
