= Kinnaman =

Kinnaman is a surname. Notable people with the surname include:

- Daniel L. Kinnaman (1933–2025), American politician
- Joel Kinnaman (born 1979), Swedish-American actor
- Melanie Kinnaman (born 1953), American dancer and actress
- Melinda Kinnaman (born 1971), Swedish-American actress
