= Szilveszter E. Vizi =

Hungarian scientist

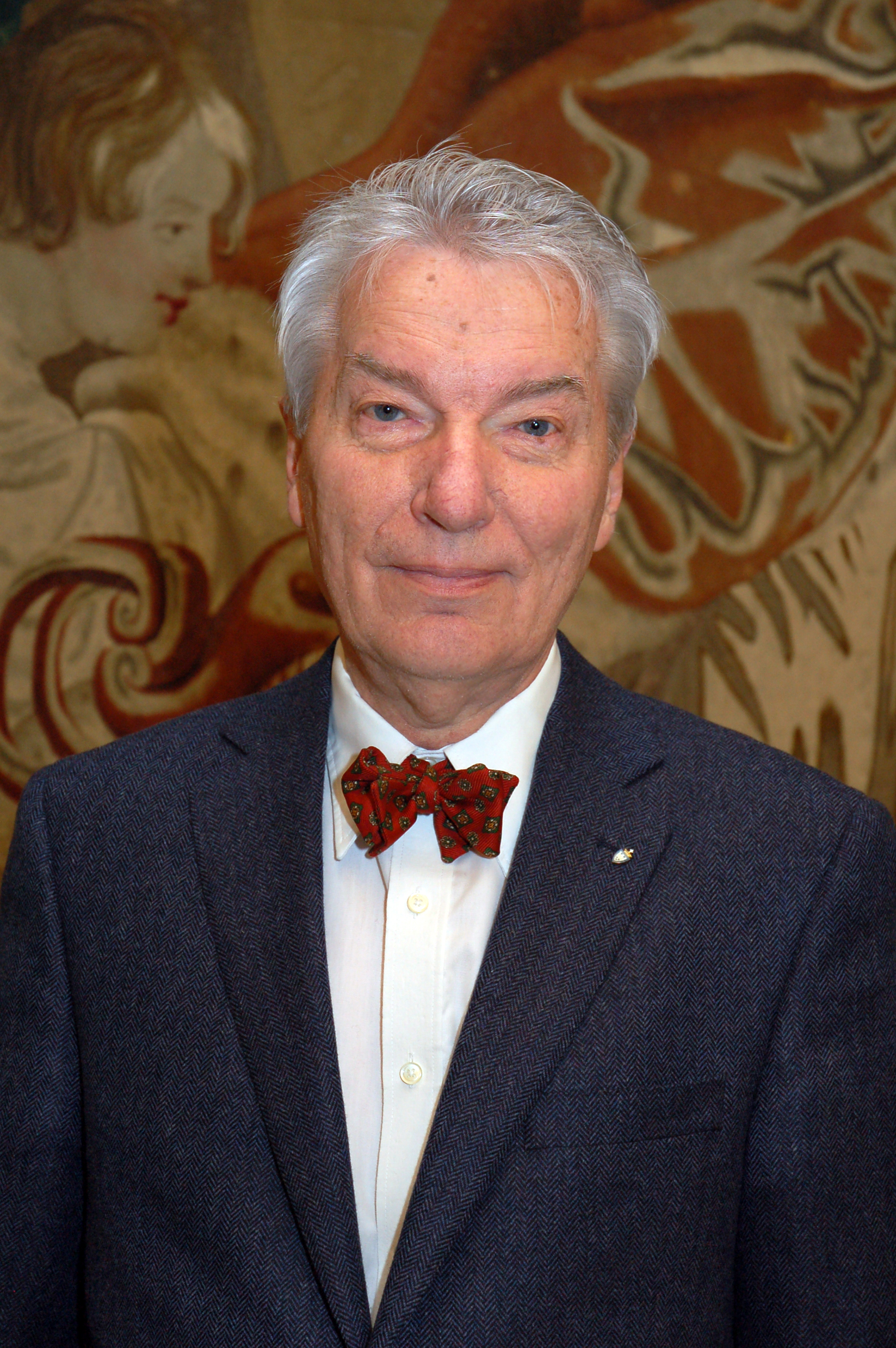
- E. S. Vizi
- Born: 31 December 1936 (age 89); Budapest
- Citizenship: Hungarian
- Spouse: Veronika Ádám
- Children: 2
- Scientific career
- Fields: Medicine

Szilveszter E. Vizi (31 December 1936) is a Hungarian physician, neuroscientist, pharmacologist and university professor who served as President of the Hungarian Academy of Sciences between 2002 and 2008. He issues some of his papers under the name E. S. Vizi or E. Sylvester Vizi.

== Biography ==
Vizi was born in Budapest. He is the father of two children (a son and a daughter). His wife, Veronika Ádám, is a professor of biochemistry at the Semmelweis University and also a full member of the Hungarian Academy of Sciences.

Even though his studies had started in Pécs at the University of Medicine, he then moved to Budapest in 1956, where he graduated in 1961 in (now called) Semmelweis University, the oldest medical school in Hungary. After graduation Vizi remained at the university, where at first he became an assistant professor and in 1965, an associate professor at the Department of Pharmacology.

He earned the title Candidate of Sciences (PhD) in 1969. Vizi received his evaluation as professor of pharmacology in 1976. One year later he earned the title Doctor of Sciences (DSc). The same year Vizi was named deputy chairman of the medical research council department at the Ministry of Health in Hungary. He held both posts until 1981, when he became the deputy director at the Institute of Experimental Medicine of the Hungarian Academy of Sciences (HAS) and Chair of the Department of Pharmacology and Therapy at the Imre Haynal University of Health (since 2000 part of Semmelweis University). He was named director of the institute in 1989 and held this post until 2002.

He was elected to the academy as a corresponding member in 1985 and as a full member in 1990. Vizi worked as vice president of the academy from 1996 to 2002, when he became the president of the academy. He held his position until 2008. He was inducted to the Academia Europaea in 1992. In 2010, he was elected to the board of the Hungarian Football Association.

Vizi was a Riker Fellow at the Department of Pharmacology of the University of Oxford from 1967 to 1969, where he worked alongside Sir William Paton. He was visiting professor at the universities of Mainz and Parma. He also taught at the Albert Einstein College of Medicine of Yeshiva University (Montefiore Medical Center) as a visiting professor since 1984.

Vizi works as Editor-in-chief of Neurochemistry International and as Section Editor of the Brain Research Bulletin.

== Publications ==
- Phenylisopropylmethylpropynylamine (E-250), a monoaminoxidase inhibitor antagonising the effect of tyramin (co-author, 1968)
- The inhibitory action of norandrenaline and adrenaline on acetylcholine output by guinea-pig ileum longitudinal muscle strip (co-author, 1969)
- The mechanism of acetylcholine release from parasympathetic nerves (társszerzőkkel, 1971)
- Evidence That Acetylcholine Released by Gastrin and Related Polypeptides Contributes to Their Effect on Gastrointestinal Motility (co-author, 1973)
- The Inhibitory Effect of Adenosine and Related Nulceotids on the Release of Acetylcholine (with Jószef Knoll, 1976)
- Na~~+-K~~+-activated adenosinetriphosphatase as a trigger in transmitter release (co-author, 1978)
- Changes in total and quantal release of acetylcholine in the mouse diaphragm during activation and inhibition of membrane ATPase (co-author, 1979)
- Presynaptic Modulation of Neurochemical Transmission (1979)
- Non-Synaptic Interactions between Neurons (1984)
- Effect of nicotine on extracellular levels of neurotransmitters assessed by microdialysis in various brain regions: Role of glutamic acid (co-author, 1992)
- Science in the Future of Europe (1994)
- Adenosine receptor agonists differentially regulate IL-10, TNF-~a, and nitric oxide production in RAW 264.7 macrophages and in endotoxemic mice (co-author, 1996)
- Neurochemistry and pharmacology of the major hippocampal transmitter systems: Synaptic and nonsynaptic interactions (co-author, 1998)
- Presynaptically located CB1 cannabinoid receptors regulate GABA release from axon terminals of specific hippocampal interneurons (co-author, 1999)
- Modulatory role of presynaptic nicotinic receptors in synaptic and non-synaptic chemical communication in the nervous system (co-author, 1999)
- The sympathetic nerve-an integrative interface between two supersystems: The brain and the immune system (co-author, 2000)
- Role of high-affinity receptors and membrane transporters in nonsynaptic communication and drug action in the nervous system (co-author, 2000)
- Nitric oxide: a novel link between synaptic and nonsynaptic transmission (coauthor, 2001)
- Handbook of neurochemistry and molecular neurobiology: Neurotransmitter systems (with Ábel Lajtha, 2008)
- Non-synaptic receptors and transporters involved in brain functions and targets of drug treatment (co-author, 2010)

Cultural offices
Preceded by Ferenc Glatz	President of the Hungarian Academy of Sciences; 2002–2008	Succeeded by József Pálinkás
