= Kamran Shirazi =

Iranian chess player (born 1952)

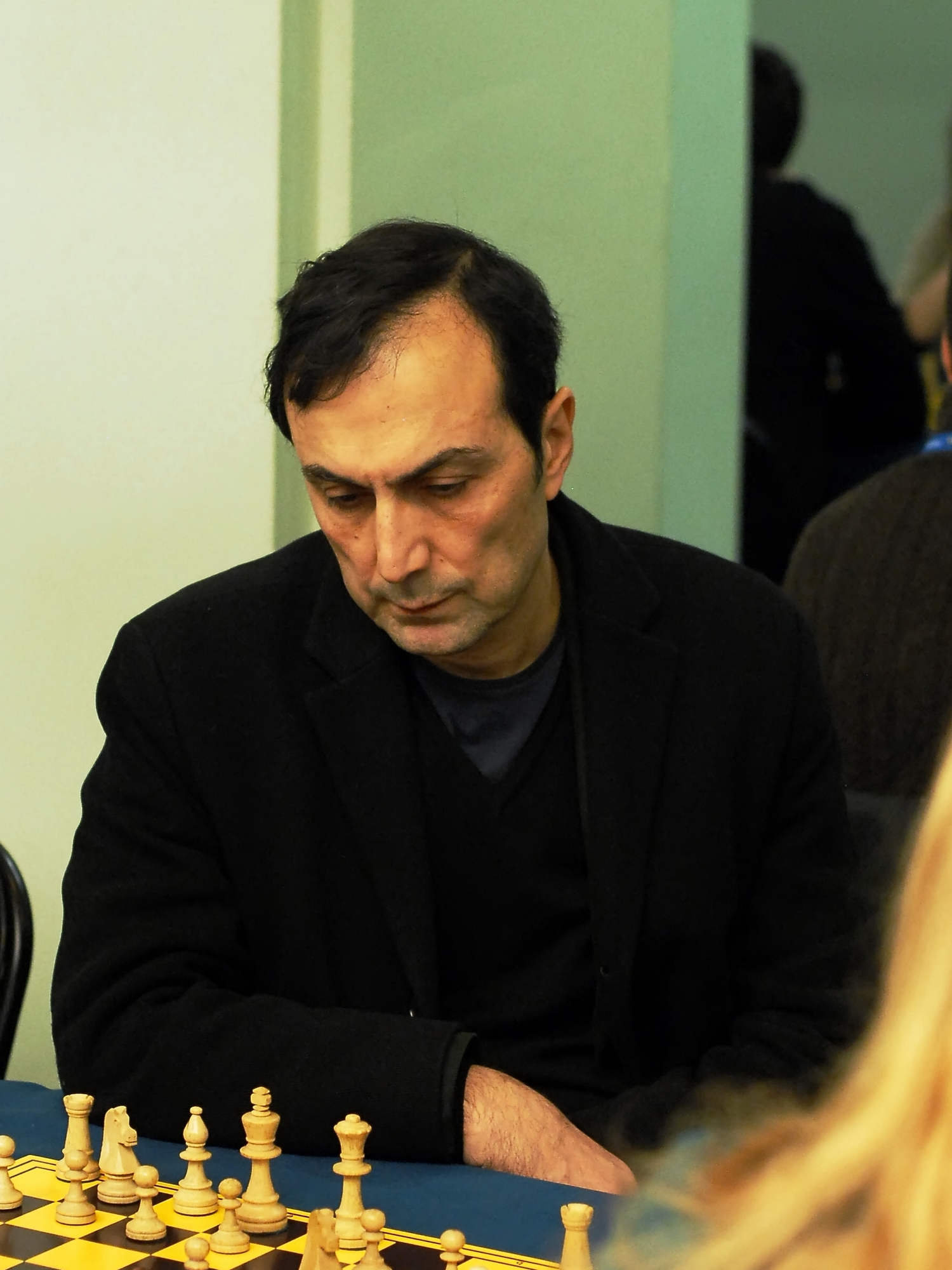
- Kamran Shirazi, Warsaw 2012

Personal information
- Born: 21 November 1952 (age 73) Tehran, Iran

Chess career
- Country: Iran (until 1983); United States (1984–2005); France (since 2006)
- Title: International Master (1978)
- Peak rating: 2486 (April 2002)

Kamran Shirazi (Persian: کامران شیرازی; born 21 November 1952) is an International Master of chess, who won the Iranian Chess Championship in 1972. Born in Tehran, he has represented Iran, the United States, and France. He moved to the United States in the late 1970s and quickly became one of the most active players in the country, winning many tournaments, including the Southern California Open (five times), the World Open (tied for first in 1983), the National Open (tied for first in 1985), and the Memorial Day Classic (tied for first in 1986).

He was known for playing strange and unorthodox openings. Shirazi's rating rose rapidly and he became one of the highest rated players in the United States Chess Federation. In the 1984 U.S. Chess Championship, Shirazi managed only one draw from 17 games, finishing last, and achieved the dubious distinction of losing the shortest decisive game in the history of the U.S. Championship: his game as White against John Peters, which went 1.e4 c5 2.b4 cxb4 3.a3 d5 4.exd5 Qxd5 5.axb4?? Qe5+ 0-1.

He subsequently made an appearance in the movie Searching for Bobby Fischer. He is introduced as "Grandmaster Shirazi" but his actual title is International Master, awarded in 1978.

As of 2006, Shirazi had been living in France for several years. He changed his FIDE federation from the US to France in 2006. As of 2020, Shirazi plays online on the chess site Lichess.org.

On the September 2019 FIDE list, he has an Elo rating of 2347.

== Notable games ==
In this game, Kamran Shirazi boldly plays an extremely sharp line regarded as dubious for Black (White has won many brilliancies in this line), and beats a computer with it:

Fidelity S2 computer-Shirazi, 1986 1.e4 e5 2.Nc3 Nc6 3.Bc4 Bc5 4.Qg4 Qf6?! 5.Nd5! Qxf2+ 6.Kd1 Nf6 7.Qxg7 Nxd5 8.Qxh8+ Bf8 9.exd5 Qxg2 10.dxc6 d6 11.cxb7 Bg4+ 12.Ke1 Qe4+ 13.Kf2 Qf4+ 14.Nf3 Qxf3+ 15.Kg1 Rb8 16.Qxh7 d5 17.Bb5+ c6 18.Bxc6+ Kd8 19.Qh4+ Kc7 20.Qf2 Kxc6 21.c3 Bc5 22.d4 exd4 23.cxd4 Qd1+ 24.Kg2 Bh3+ 25.Kxh3 Rh8+ 26.Kg3 Rg8+ 27.Bg5 Rxg5+ 28.Kf4 Qg4+ 29.Ke3 Qxd4+ 30.Ke2 Qxf2+ 31.Kd3 Qd4+ 32.Kc2 Rg2+ 33.Kc1 Qe3+ 34.Kb1 Qd3+ 35.Kc1 Be3# 0-1

Silman-Shirazi, Lone Pine 1979 1.e4 c5 2.Nf3 Nc6 3.Bb5 Qb6 4.Nc3 e6 5.O-O a6 6.Bc4 Qa5 7.Re1 b5 8.Bd5 Nge7 9.d3 Qc7 10.Bxc6 Nxc6 11.e5 Bb7 12.Bf4 f5 13.a4 b4 14.Nb1 Ne7 15.h4 h6 16.Nbd2 g5 17.Nc4 Ng6 18.Bg3 g4 19.h5 gxf3 20.hxg6 Rg8 21.Re3 Rxg6 22.Rxf3 Bxf3 23.Qxf3 Qc6 24.Qh5 Kf7 25.f3 Be7 26.Kh1 Kg7 27.Bh4 Rg5! 0-1 If 28.Bxg5 hxg5, White is helpless against the threat of 29...Rh8 trapping his queen.
