= ASN Neuro =

- Discipline: Neurochemistry
- Language: English
- Edited by: Douglas Feinstein

Publication details
- History: 2009-present
- Publisher: SAGE Publications on behalf of the American Society for Neurochemistry
- Frequency: Bimonthly
- Open access: Yes
- License: Creative Commons Attribution 3.0
- Impact factor: 3.617 (2017)

Standard abbreviations
- ISO 4: ASN Neuro

Indexing
- CODEN: ANSEFU
- ISSN: 1759-0914
- OCLC no.: 318973217

Links
- Journal homepage; Online access; Online archive

ASN Neuro is a peer-reviewed open access scientific journal covering neurochemistry. It is published by SAGE Publications on behalf of the American Society for Neurochemistry, of which it is the official journal. The founding editor-in-chief was Anthony Campagnoni (University of California, Los Angeles), who was succeeded by Monica Carson (University of California, Riverside), and then in 2018 by Douglas L. Feinstein (University of Illinois, Chicago).

== Abstracting and indexing ==
The journal is abstracted and indexed in Science Citation Index Expanded, BIOSIS Previews, Scopus, and Index Medicus/MEDLINE/PubMed. According to the Journal Citation Reports, the journal has a 2017 impact factor of 3.617
