= European Society for Neurochemistry =

- Abbreviation: ESN
- Formation: 1976
- Type: Learned society
- Website: www.neurochemsoc.eu

The European Society for Neurochemistry (ESN) is a learned society for neurochemists and neuroscientists from Europe whose research focuses on the role and interactions of small molecules in the function and pathology of the nervous system.

== History ==
The society was founded in 1976 with to help advance the field of neurochemistry for the public benefit, in particular to facilitate the exchange of ideas and interests among members.

In the years before the ESN's establishment, many European neurochemists were centrally involved in the development of the subject, for example in the discussions that led to the establishment of the Journal of Neurochemistry in 1956 and in the formation of the International Society for Neurochemistry (ISN) in 1967. In the same year as the foundation of ISN, the Neurochemical Group of the British Biochemical Society was established. Many of its meetings had an international and particularly European flavour.

From 1974 to 1975, in particular at a meeting of clinical neurochemists organised by Armand Lowenthal in Brussels in 1974, many participants expressed the need for a Society of Neurochemistry in Europe, which would not only provide a forum for exchanging ideas about and developments in the subject but also provide a vehicle for strong contact between clinically oriented and basic neurochemists. The various views were finally co-coordinated at a meeting organised by Lars Svennerholm at the Billinghus conference centre in Skövde, Sweden, in May 1975. Some general principles were agreed upon: the society should be open to members from all European countries, East and West, who were interested in neurochemistry and allied subjects, and it should pay special attention to clinical and applied aspects of the subject.

The working party accepted an invitation, through Alan Davison from the Neurochemical Group of the British Biochemical Society, to organise the first meeting to be held in Bath, UK, in September 1976. All members of the organising committee (Brian Ansell, Tim Hawthorne, George Lunt, and Herman S. Bachelard) were in the Neurochemical Group of the British Biochemical Society. The working party had requested that the meeting should have a clinical theme, so the general area of "Basic Aspects of Neurochemistry Related to the Epilepsies" was chosen. Approximately 350 participants attended.

== Meetings ==
Meetings are held every two years. From 1999, every six years the ESN helps organise a joint meeting with the International Society for Neurochemistry. ESN meetings are designed to promote scientific discussions. Special efforts are taken to encourage young investigators to participate. Short oral presentations are selected from the submitted abstracts. There are daily poster sessions.

== See also ==
- Juan Pedro Bolaños
