= American Society for Neurochemistry =

The American Society for Neurochemistry (ASN) is a professional society for neurochemists and neuroscientists from North, Central, and South America and the Caribbean, whose research concerns the role and interactions of small molecules (proteins, peptides, nucleic acids, lipids, sugars) in the development, growth, function, and pathology of the nervous system.

== History ==
The ASN was incorporated August 5, 1969, and is guided by a set of bylaws and standing rules that incorporate amendments to the bylaws. The first president was Donald B. Tower, Jordi Folch Pi was the second president. The current president (2013–2015) is Etty Benveniste (University of Alabama at Birmingham) and the current president elect is Babette Fuss (Richmond, Virginia). Elections are held ever 2 years to elect the next president, treasurer, secretary, and council members.

== Organization ==
The officers and council members are assisted by a number of standing committees. An informal history of the ASN has been put together by Claude Baxter.

== Annual meeting ==
Annual meetings include plenary lectures, symposia, colloquia and workshops over the course of 4 days. The first such meeting was held March 16–18, 1970 in Albuquerque, New Mexico.

Every 6 years, the ASN helps organize a joint meeting with the International Society for Neurochemistry.

== Publications ==
The ASN publishes the textbook Basic Neurochemistry for use by undergraduate, graduate, and post graduate students and instructors. The founding editor was George Siegel, and the current chief editor is Scott Brady. It is currently in its 8th edition, which was published in December 2011.

The ASN launched an open access online journal, ASN Neuro, at the 40th annual meeting which took place in March 2009. It was initially published by Portland Press, and taken over by SAGE Publications in 2014. ASN Neuro furthers the ASN missions to advance, promote, support, encourage and facilitate communication among cellular and molecular neuroscientists.

== Awards ==
The Jordi Folch-Pi Award is given to an outstanding young investigator who has demonstrated a high level of research competence and originality, who has significantly advanced our knowledge of neurochemistry and who shows a high degree of potential for future accomplishments.

The Marian Kies Memorial Award is given to a junior scientist for outstanding research conducted during graduate training.

The Bernard Haber Award recognizes an individual whose leadership skills have fostered collaborations among the world's neuroscientists.

The ASN offers Young Investigator Educational Enhancement awards to graduate students in their last year of studies and who reside in the Americas to travel to the annual meeting. Beginning at the 2010 meeting, one YIEE awardee is selected to receive the ASN Neuro travel award.

ASN also offers Young Latin American Award scholarships for young neuroscientists from Latin American countries. These awards subsidize travel expenses to attend the Annual Meeting, along with a short visit to an established neuroscience laboratory in North America.

== See also ==
- Society for Neuroscience
- European Society for Neurochemistry
- Journal of Neurochemistry
