= O Carballiño =

- Municipality
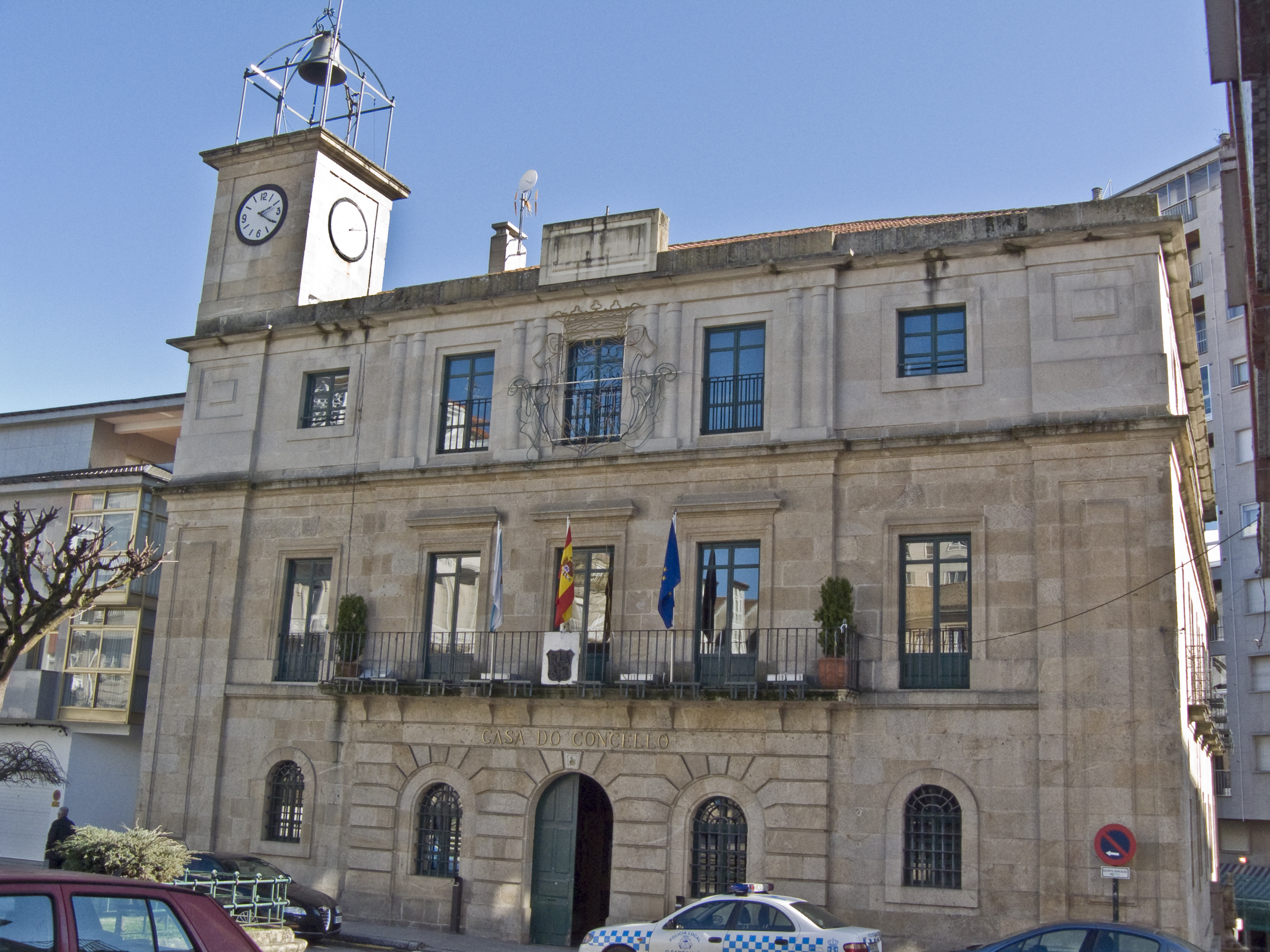
- Town Hall

- Coat of arms

- Location in the Province of Ourense Location in Galicia Location in Spain
- Coordinates: 42°25′50″N 8°4′45″W
- Country: Spain
- Autonomous Community: Galicia
- Province: Ourense
- Comarca: O Carballiño

Government
  - Mayor: Francisco Fumega (PSdeG)

Area
  - Total: 54 km^{2} (21 sq mi)
- Elevation (AMSL): 26.549 m (87.10 ft)

Population (2019)
  - Total: 14,249
  - Density: 260/km^{2} (680/sq mi)
- Time zone: UTC+1 (CET)
  - Summer (DST): UTC+2 (CEST (GMT +2))
- Postal code: 32500
- Area code: +34 (Spain) + 988 (Orense)
- Website: www.carballino.org

O Carballiño (Spanish: Carballino) is a municipality in the province of Ourense, in the autonomous community of Galicia, Spain. It has a population of 13,939 (2019) and an area of 54 km^{2}.

== Notable people ==
- María Teresa Miras Portugal (1948–2021), scientist born in O Carballiño
