= John P. Peters =

American physician and chemist (1887–1955)

John Punnett Peters (December 4, 1887 – December 29, 1955) was an American physician, the John Slade Ely Professor of Medicine at Yale University from 1928 until his death in 1955. He was "one of the founders of modern clinical chemistry". His 1932 textbook Quantitative Clinical Chemistry, coauthored with Donald Van Slyke, established clinical chemistry as a distinct discipline. His research articles and textbooks advanced the laboratory in the diagnosis and management of disease. The book advanced the study of clinical chemistry, i.e. the measurement of blood levels of sodium, potassium, glucose, etc. as essential components of understanding health and disease. Along with other physicians and scientists, he “established the basis of our present scientific understanding of body fluids.”

Peters was born in Philadelphia. He spent much of his growing up years in New York City. He did his undergraduate education at Yale University and earned his medical degree at Columbia University. During World War I he served as a medical doctor in the US army.

== Loyalty/McCarthyism/Supreme Court Case ==
John P. Peters was known not only for his pioneering work in human metabolism, but also for his passionate efforts to bring National Health Insurance to the United States at the close of the second World War. He was accused of being a Communist because of this cause and his loyalty was questioned by a review board of the National Institutes of Health where he served in a $50-per-year consultant position on a Public Health Service peer review panel. He fought to clear his name, to have the right to face who had accused him in a case that ultimately came before the Supreme Court in 1955 (Peters v. Hobby, 349 U.S. 331). He won the case, but not the precedent he had hoped for: the right to face his accuser. Instead, the Supreme Court stated his dismissal was illegal by the Loyalty Review Board. They had reopened his case in 1953 after he had been cleared by 2 other NIH loyalty boards and the Court decided they had no cause to address his loyalty yet again. (Interestingly, the chairman of this Loyalty Review Board was also a Yalie, Hiriam Bingham, the man who “discovered” Machu Picchu).

He was deeply disappointed that he was unable to get the Supreme Court to decide that he had a right to face his accuser. He knew it was a secret informant, not under oath, not present at the loyalty hearings, and he died without knowing who this person was. His third child, a son and also a physician, Richard Morse Peters, M.D. tried for many years using the Freedom of Information Act to request government records, without success even at his death in 2006.

This tactic was used frequently during McCarthyism and John Punnett Peters, M.D. was quoted as saying, “It doesn’t matter much to an old fellow like myself, but it is the principle of the thing that counts.”

In 2007, an undergraduate history major at Yale, Jonathan Bressler, was able to find out the name of his accuser, Louis Budenz, a former active member of the Communist Party USA and managing editor of the Daily Worker, who had recanted his beliefs and become well paid as an informant. He had testified publicly against Linus Pauling in 1948 and “Unfortunately, Budenz was granted immunity from prosecution for perjury by the very same congressional committee Pauling was attacking. The ‘rat’ was allowed to scurry away in silence.”

== Early life and education ==
John P. Peters, Jr was born on December 4, 1887 in Philadelphia, PA, the third child of John Punnett Peters and Gabriella Brooke Forman Peters. His oldest brother, Thomas McClure Peters had died in 1885, at less than 2 years of age and his older sister, Brooke, had been born on August 1, 1885. He was one of 6 surviving siblings that included Frazier Forman Peters, who became a well known architect, especially known for his signature stone houses in Westport, CT.

John P. Peters lived abroad with his family as a young child while his father conducted excavations in Babylonia and then moved to Dresden, Germany and then Beirut, Lebanon. His father, John Punnett Peters, was then elected Rector of St. Michael’s Episcopal Church in New York, the same church his own father had served as Rector.

At the age of 13, in 1900, John P. Peters, Jr.(AKA “Jack”) enrolled in St. John Manlius School(a military academy) in upstate New York and 4 years later entered Yale College just shy of his 17th birthday. He competed as a diver while in college, graduating in 1908 and then returned to St. John Manlius School for one year to teach English and Latin.

He started medical school in 1909 at the College of Physicians and Surgeons, New York City (now Columbia University College of Physicians and Surgeons). While in medical school, he met his future wife, Charlotte Morse Hodge, but they were not allowed to marry until he had completed the first 2 years of his post graduate training. This was a standard policy of medical training at the time, because it was deemed a distraction to aspiring doctors and this vow of celibacy was not abandoned at all U.S. medical schools until after WWII.

Jack and Charlotte married in June, 1915, the same month he finished his 2-year internship at Presbyterian Hospital in New York. He then began a 2-year fellowship for research in clinical medicine at the same hospital and while there also held appointments as instructor in clinical medicine at Columbia University and as assistant visiting physician at Presbyterian Hospital.

When the United States entered World War I, he was ordered abroad in May, 1917 with the Presbyterian Base Hospital Unit, which took over British General Hospital No. 1 at Etretat, France. While there, he was initially able to do some “research work in war medicine” but this fell by the wayside as his“administrative work increased to such an extent as to stop all investigation.”

== Career ==
He returned to New York after the war and held positions of instructor of medicine at Cornell Medical College and Adjunct assistant physician to Bellevue Hospital, New York.

He received the appointment of associate professor of Medicine at Vanderbilt University in July, 1920, but was granted a leave of absence for the first year while the medical school was being re-organized. He spent this year under the tutelage of Dr. D.D.Van Slyke at the Hospital of the Rockefeller Institute. He continued to collaborate with Dr. Van Slyke and together they published the landmark book, Quantitative Clinical Chemistry in 2 volumes in 1931.

The job at Vanderbilt was delayed another year so he resigned that position and in July, 1921, accepted a position of Associate Professor of Medicine at Yale where he remained until his death in 1955.

In 1927, he was promoted to full professor and in January of 1928, he was appointed John Slade Ely Professor of Medicine and held this position until his death in 1955. He established a research program in metabolism. built up the clinical laboratory and was at the forefront of clinicians who “understood the basic knowledge of physics and chemistry that underlay their usefulness in the treatment of human disease”.

He published over 200 articles spanning a wide range of “contributions to the understanding of diseases of metabolism; electrolyte and acid base equilibrium; nephritis; water exchange; the interrelation of proteins, carbohydrates, and lipids in metabolism; the role of the thyroid in health and disease; medical education; and the role of the government in medical care”.

He co-authored Quantitative Clinical Chemistry, Volumes 1 and 2 with D.D. Van Slyke in 1931, and authored Body Water in 1935. “Every medical student, whether he knows it or not, is a student of Peters,” wrote Donald D. Van Slyke. “His contributions to the pathologic physiology of the circulatory, respiratory, excretory and endocrine systems, of the metabolism of proteins, fats, carbohydrates, electrolytes and water have been integrated into the science of medicine.”

Each year, the American Society of Nephrology gives out “The John P. Peters Award which recognizes individuals who have made substantial research contributions to the discipline of nephrology and have sustained achievements in one or more domains of academic medicine including clinical care, education and leadership.”

== Death ==
John P. Peters, M.D. died of the complications of a heart attack he had suffered several months earlier on December 29, 1955, at the age of 68, less than a year after his Supreme Court case was adjudicated.
