= Current Alzheimer Research =

Medical journal

- Discipline: Neurology
- Language: English
- Edited by: Debomoy K. Lahiri

Publication details
- History: 2004-present
- Publisher: Bentham Science Publishers
- Frequency: 14/year
- Impact factor: 3.047 (2019)

Standard abbreviations
- ISO 4: Curr. Alzheimer Res.

Indexing
- CODEN: CARUBY
- ISSN: 1567-2050 (print); 1875-5828 (web)
- OCLC no.: 225919331

Links
- Journal homepage; Online access; Online archive

Current Alzheimer Research is a peer-reviewed medical journal covering the neurobiology, genetics, pathogenesis, and treatment strategies of Alzheimer's disease.

== Abstracting and indexing ==
The journal is indexed in:

- Chemical Abstracts
- MEDLINE/Index Medicus
- PsycINFO
- BIOSIS Previews
- Science Citation Index Expanded
- Neuroscience Citation Index
- Scopus
- EMBASE
- BIOBASE

According to the Journal Citation Reports, the journal has a 2019 impact factor of 3.047, ranking it 65th out of 197 journals in the category "Clinical Neurology".
