= Frazier Forman Peters =

American architect (1895–1963)

Frazier Forman Peters (July 20, 1895 - February 1963) was an American builder and architect specializing in stone houses. He also wrote books on the subject.

== Career ==
Peters was born in New York City, the son of the Revd. John Punnett Peters, a noted minister. He worked briefly as a chemical engineer, then settled in Westport, Connecticut, where he became a builder and eventually (ca. 1936) an architect. His first major project was a stone house he built in Westport in the late 1920s for his own family. It featured two living rooms, two offices, and six bedrooms. Difficult economic conditions meant that Peters and his wife were both engaged in small businesses and attempting to be self-sufficient.

In 1936, Peters came to the attention of a Mrs. E. G. Rionda, who later had him design and build a colony of stone houses on her estate in Alpine, New Jersey. At that time, Peters was gaining small commissions by writing articles for design magazines. Frazier was influenced by the work of Ernest Flagg and evolved innovative and cost-effective methods of stone building construction. He described these methods in his books, teaching building methodologies that an ordinary person could use to build their own home. The Great Depression forced Peters to move from Westport to Warwick, New York in 1936. There he eventually established a community, Points of View, populated with stone houses designed and built by him, in one of which he dwelt until his death.

He died of cancer in February 1963. His second wife, Laura [Stromme], known to her family as Ted, survived him, dying in 1974.

His granddaughter, architect Laura Blau, co-authored a book, "Frazier Forman Peters; Westports Legacy in Stone", (2014) with Robert Weingarten. The book supported and published by the Westport Historical Society, https://westporthistory.org/, catalogs the known Peters houses in Westport. Many Peters' homes exist in the surrounding communities and a few more across the country. Weingarten researched each property's deed history. Blau wrote the biography and history of Peter's career and explores his work including family anecdotes, information on early sustainable design, and signature design and building methods.

== Bibliography ==
- Houses Of Stone - New York (1936), G. P. Putnam's Sons
- Without Benefit of an Architect - New York (1937), G.P.Putnam's Sons
- Pour Yourself A House - New York (1949), McGraw Hill
- Pour Yourself A House - Low Cost Building with Concrete and Stone - New York (1949), Whittlesey House
- Buying A House Worth The Money - - Boston (1950), Little, Brown
