= John Punnett Peters =

American clergyman and Orientalist (1852–1921)

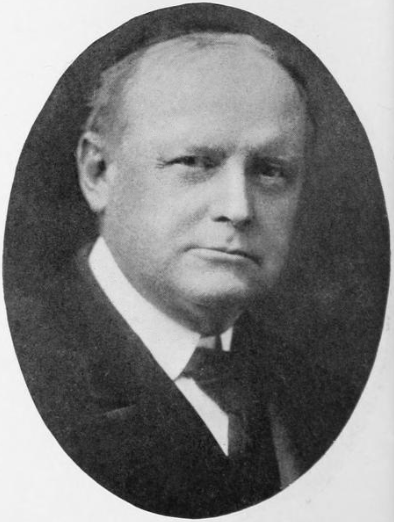
- Born: December 16, 1852; New York City, US
- Died: November 10, 1921 (aged 68); New York City, US
- Resting place: Saint Michael's Cemetery, Queens, New York
- Education: Yale University; Yale Divinity School
- Occupations: Clergyman, writer
- Spouse: Gabriella Brooke "Brooke" Forman Peters
- Children: 7, including John P. Peters and Frazier Forman Peters

John Punnett Peters (December 16, 1852 – November 10, 1921) was an American Episcopal clergyman and Orientalist.

== Biography ==
John Punnett Peters was born in New York City on December 16, 1852. He graduated from Hopkins School in 1868 and then from Yale in 1873. He was part of the school's first football team, and continued to play while he pursued graduate studies at Yale Divinity School. He studied at Berlin and at Leipzig. He was professor of Old Testament languages and literature at the Protestant Episcopal Divinity School in Philadelphia (1884–91) and professor of Hebrew at the University of Pennsylvania (1885–93). From 1888 to 1895, he conducted excavations at Nippur with John Henry Haynes and Hermann Volrath Hilprecht. His public criticisms of statements made by Hilprecht in speeches and published works regarding the provenance of a number of artifacts presented as discoveries made in Nippur sparked what became known as the "Peters-Hilbrecht Controversy." He became rector of St. Michael's Episcopal Church (Manhattan) in 1893 and served in that role until he retired in 1919. From 1904 to 1910, John Punnett Peters was also canon residentiary of the Cathedral of St. John the Divine. He was active in promoting an intellectual approach to religion, social service, and positive relations between labor and management. Peters was an outspoken opponent of municipal corruption and was active in the Excise Reform Association's West Side branch in Manhattan. As chairman of the Committee of Fourteen in New York City from the time of its founding in 1905 to 1910, and again from 1912 to 1916, Peters worked to close down or otherwise manage Raines law hotels while advocating numerous reforms to law enforcement institutions and practices. Combined with his father and grandfather, the Peters served as rectors of St. Michael's for 99 years.

Architect Frazier Forman Peters was his son. Another son, also named John Punnett Peters (December 4, 1887 – December 29, 1955), initially described the cerebral salt-wasting syndrome.

John Punnett Peters died from a heart attack in New York on November 10, 1921.

== Works ==
- Nippur, or Explorations and Adventures on the Euphrates (two volumes, 1897)
- The Old Testament and the New Scholarship (1901)
- Labor and Capital (1902)
- Early Hebrew Story: Its Historical Background (1904)
- With Hermann Thiersch, Painted tombs in the necropolis of Marissa (Marêshah) (1905)
- Annals of St. Michael's, New York, for One Hundred Years, 1807-1907 (1907)
- Modern Christianity (1909)
- Jesus Christ and the Old Commandments (1913)
- The Religion of the Hebrews (1914)
- The Psalms as Liturgies (1921)
- Bible and Spade (1922)

== See also ==
- Apollophanes Cave
