= Van Slyke determination =

Chemical test

The Van Slyke determination is a chemical test for the determination of amino acids containing a primary amine group. It is named after the biochemist Donald Dexter Van Slyke (1883-1971).

One of Van Slyke's first professional achievements was the quantification of amino acids by the Van Slyke determination reaction. To quantify aliphatic amino acids, the sample is diluted in glycerol and then treated with a solution of sodium nitrite, water and acetic acid. The resulting diazotisation reaction produces nitrogen gas which can be observed qualitatively or measured quantitatively.

Van Slyke Reaction:

$\ce{R-NH2 + HONO -> ROH + N2 + H2O}$

In addition, Van Slyke developed the so-called Van Slyke apparatus, which can be used to determine the concentration of respiratory gases in the blood, especially the concentration of sodium bicarbonate. This was of high importance to be able to recognize a beginning acidosis in diabetic patients as early as possible, in order to start alkali treatment. The Van Slyke apparatus became a standard equipment in clinical laboratories around the world and the results of Van Slyke's research are still used today to determine abnormalities in the acid-base homeostasis. Later on, Van Slyke further improved his apparatus, increasing its accuracy and sensitivity. Using the new method, he was able to further investigate the role of gas and electrolyte equilibria in the blood and how they change in response to respiration. The oxygen carrying capacity of blood is estimated by Van Slyke gasometry method.
