= Neurochemistry International =

- Discipline: Neuroscience
- Language: English
- Edited by: Michael Robinson

Publication details
- Publisher: Elsevier
- Frequency: 10/year
- Impact factor: 4.297 (2021)

Standard abbreviations
- ISO 4: Neurochem. Int.

Indexing
- CODEN: NEUIDS
- ISSN: 0197-0186 (print); 1872-9754 (web)
- OCLC no.: 05937082

Links
- Journal homepage

Neurochemistry International is a peer-reviewed scientific journal covering research in neurochemistry, including molecular and cellular neurochemistry, neuropharmacology and genetic aspects of central nervous system function, neuroimmunology, metabolism as well as the neurochemistry of neurological and psychiatric disorders of the CNS. It is published by Elsevier and the editor-in-chief is Michael Robinson (Children's Hospital of Philadelphia). According to the Journal Citation Reports, the journal has a 2021 impact factor of 4.297.
