= Florence Arenberg =

American botanist

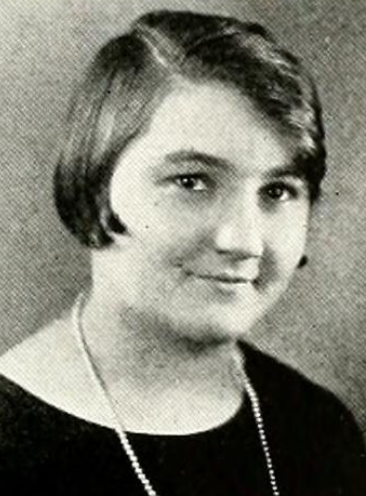
- Florence Arenberg, from the 1926 yearbook of Chicago Normal College
- Born: Florence Freida Arenberg; May 25, 1907; Chicago
- Died: May 31, 1995 (aged 88)
- Occupation: Botanist

Florence Freida Arenberg (May 25, 1907 – May 31, 1995) was an American botanist and biology educator, based in Chicago. Her standard author abbreviation in botanical contexts is Arenb.

== Early life and education ==
Arenberg was born in Chicago, the daughter of Meyer Isidor Arenberg and Rebecca Arenberg. Her parents were both Jewish immigrants from Lithuania, then part of the Russian Empire. Her mother died in 1914, and she was raised, in part, by her stepmother, Tillie Silberman Arenberg. She trained as a teacher at the Chicago Normal College, graduating in 1926, and earned a master's degree in botany at the University of Wyoming, with a thesis titled "The Agaricaceae from the Medicine Bow Mountains of Wyoming" (1939).

== Career ==
In the 1940s, Arenberg was secretary of the Chicago Biology Round Table, and a member of the Mycological Society of America (MSA). She and MSA president Alexander H. Smith of the University of Michigan were credited with first describing the fungus Strobilurus wyomingensis.

Arenberg was also active in Jewish community groups in Chicago. She was president of the HIAS (Hebrew Immigrant Aid Society) Juniors in Chicago. She traveled to Israel in 1950, and lectured about it on her return. In the 1950s, Arenberg was the principal of the religious school at Temple Beth Israel. She taught at Lane Technical High School in the 1960s. In 1960, she was awarded a grant from the Chicago Heart Association, to study animal ecology in a summer course at Penn State.

== Personal life ==
Arenberg made headlines in 1928, when she made a makeshift tourniquet to save a man with a severe wrist injury. She died in 1995, aged 88 years.
