= Jon Peters (pitcher) =

American baseball pitcher

- Pitcher
- Born: September 7, 1970 (age 55)
- Bats: Right Throws: Right

Jon Peters (born September 7, 1970) is an American former high school baseball pitcher from Brenham, Texas, famous for registering 53 consecutive wins. Standing at 6'2" and weighing 190 lbs, he was the first high school baseball player to be featured on the cover of Sports Illustrated. He played at Brenham High School, later attending Texas A&M and Blinn College.
