= Donald Van Slyke =

Dutch-American biochemist (1883–1971)

- Donald Van Slyke, during his time at Brookhaven National Laboratory
- Born: Donald Dexter Van Slyke; March 29, 1883; Pike, New York
- Died: May 4, 1971 (aged 88)
- Education: University of Michigan (BA 1905, PhD 1907)
- Known for: Kinetics of urease
- Awards: Many, including National Medal of Science
- Scientific career
- Fields: Biochemistry
- Workplaces: Rockefeller Institute, Brookhaven National Laboratory
- Doctoral advisor: Moses Gomberg

Donald Dexter Van Slyke (March 29, 1883 – May 4, 1971), nicknamed Van, was a Dutch American biochemist. His achievements included the publication of 317 journal articles and five books, as well as numerous awards, among them the National Medal of Science and the first AMA Scientific Achievement Award. The Van Slyke determination, a test of amino acids, is named after him.

== Early days and education ==
Van Slyke was born in Pike, New York on March 29, 1883. He completed his BA in 1905 and PhD in 1907 both at the University of Michigan, his father's alma mater. His PhD studies were performed under Moses Gomberg.

== Post-doctoral study ==
Van Slyke took up a post-doctoral position at the Rockefeller Institute in 1907, under Phoebus Levene. Levene also arranged for him to spend one year in Berlin under Hermann Emil Fischer in 1911. His early work focused on determining the amino acid composition of proteins. A major achievement during this time was the discovery of the amino acid hydroxylysine.

== Urease ==
Work with G. E. Cullen on urease led to a mechanism that yields a kinetic equation observationally indistinguishable from the Henri–Michaelis–Menten equation, but based on different assumptions. Whereas Henri, and later Michaelis and Menten, treated the binding of substrate to free enzyme to produce an enzyme–substrate complex as an equilibrium, Van Slyke and Cullen treated it as an irreversible reaction:

Enzyme + substrate → enzyme–substrate complex → enzyme + product

Effectively, therefore, they assumed a steady-state process. Their equation for the rate $v$ at substrate concentration $a$,

$v = \frac{Va}{k_2/k_1 + a}$

resembles the Henri–Michaelis–Menten equation but the constant $k_2/k_1$ in the denominator is interpreted differently.

== Clinical chemistry ==
In 1914, Van Slyke was appointed chief chemist of the newly founded Rockefeller Institute Hospital, where he played a key part in developing the field of clinical chemistry. His work focused especially on the measurement of gas and electrolyte levels in tissues, for which he is considered to be one of the founders of modern quantitative blood chemistry. He is also considered by many to have first popularised the term "clinical chemistry" in his two-volume work Quantitative Clinical Chemistry, co-published with John P. Peters. The two-volume work was widely accepted in the medical world as the "Bible" of quantitative clinical chemistry. During this period, he also served as managing editor of the Journal of Biological Chemistry from 1914 to 1925.

== Brookhaven ==
In 1948, approaching retirement age, Van Slyke took up a position as deputy director of biology and medicine of the newly-formed Brookhaven National Laboratory. He held this position briefly before moving back into research at Brookhaven, which he continued until his death in 1971.

== Awards and honors ==
=== Honorary doctor of science degrees ===
- Yale University, 1925
- University of Michigan, 1935
- Northwestern University, 1940
- University of Chicago, 1941
- University of London, 1951
- Rockefeller University, 1966

=== Honorary doctor of medicine degrees ===
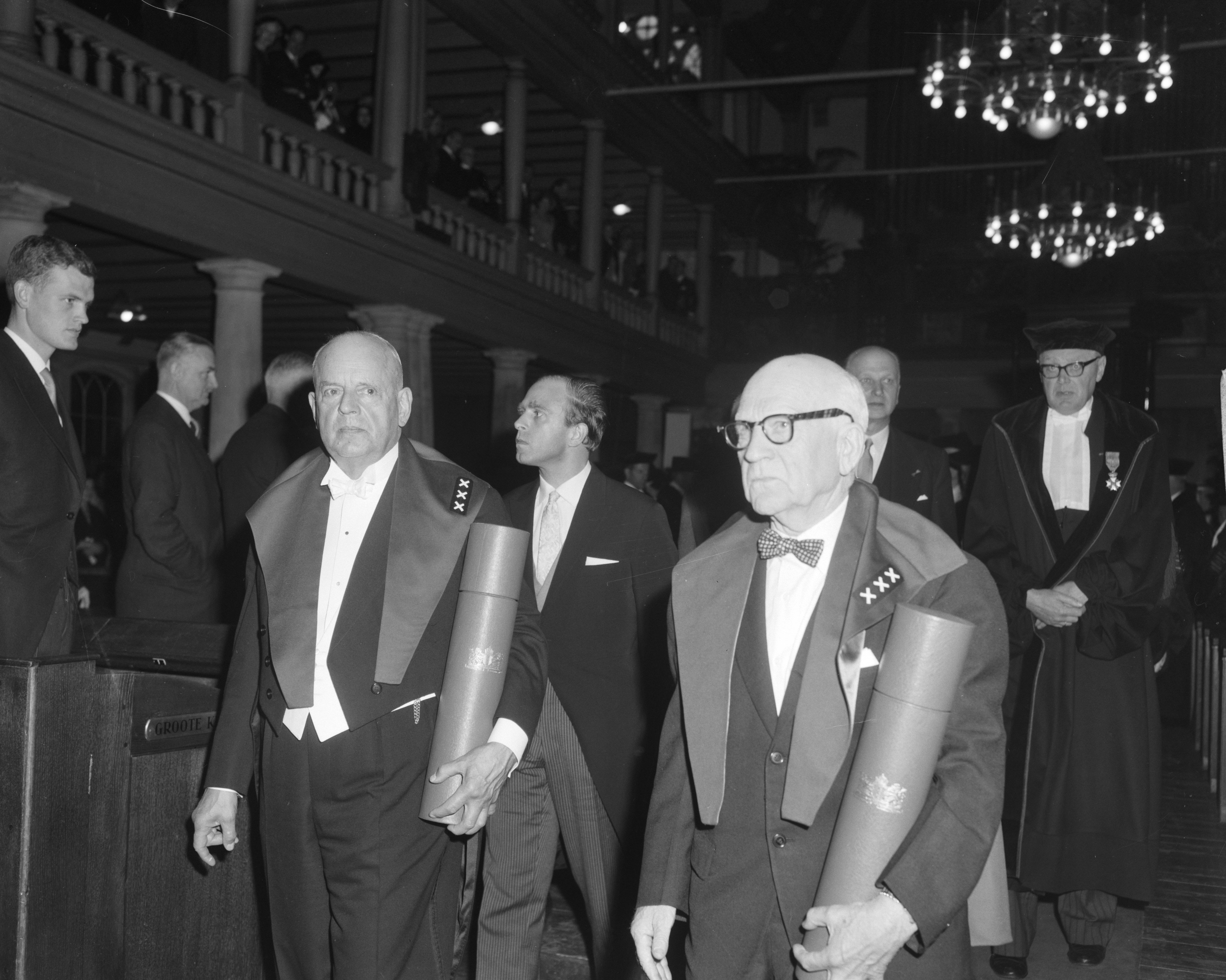
Ernst Crone & Donald Van Slyke (Amsterdam, 1962)

- University of Oslo, 1938
- University of Amsterdam, 1962
- University of Ulm, 1970

=== Medals and awards ===
- Charles Mickle Fellowship, University of Toronto, 1936
- Phillip A. Conne Medal, Chemists' Club of New York, 1936
- Willard Gibbs Award, Chicago Section of the American Chemical Society, 1939
- Order of Brilliant Jade, Republic of China, 1939
- Kober Medal, Association of American Physicians, 1942
- Order of Brilliant Star, Republic of China, 1947
- Fisher Award in Analytical Chemistry, American Chemical Society, 1953
- John Phillips Memorial Award, American College of Physicians, 1954
- First Van Slyke Award in Clinical Chemistry, American Association of Clinical Chemists, 1957
- First Scientific Achievement Award, American Medical Association, 1962
- Ames Award, American Association of Clinical Chemistry, 1964
- National Medal of Science, USA, 1965
- Elliott Cresson Medal, Franklin Institute of Philadelphia, 1965
- Academy Medal for Distinguished Contributions in Biomedical Science, New York Academy of Medicine, 1967

=== Academic Society Memberships ===
- United States National Academy of Sciences (1921)
- American Philosophical Society (1938)
- American Academy of Arts and Sciences (1940)
