= Daniel L. Kinnaman =

American politician (1933–2025)

Member of the Wyoming House of Representatives from Carbon County
- In office 1975–1978
- Preceded by: Bud R. Daily
- Succeeded by: Tom Trowbridge

Personal details
- Born: Daniel Lindsey Kinnaman; March 5, 1933 Rawlins, Wyoming, U.S.
- Died: April 24, 2025 (aged 92) Rawlins, Wyoming, U.S.
- Party: Democratic
- Parent: Elmer D. Kinnaman (father)
- Education: University of Wyoming

Daniel Lindsey Kinnaman (March 5, 1933 – April 24, 2025) was an American politician. A member of the Democratic Party, he served in the Wyoming House of Representatives from 1975 to 1978.

== Life and career ==
Kinnaman was born in Rawlins, Wyoming, the son of Elmer D. Kinnaman, a Wyoming state senator, and Ione Lindsey. He attended Rawlins High School, graduating in 1951. After graduating, he served in the armed forces during the Korean War, which after his discharge, he attended the University of Wyoming, earning his electrical engineering degree in 1957.

Kinnaman served in the Wyoming House of Representatives from 1975 to 1978. After his service in the House, he served as a trustee of the University of Wyoming from 1991 to 1997.

== Death ==
Kinnaman died on April 24, 2025, of natural causes in Rawlins, Wyoming, at the age of 92.
