= John Peters (chess player) =

American chess player (born 1951)

Jack Peters
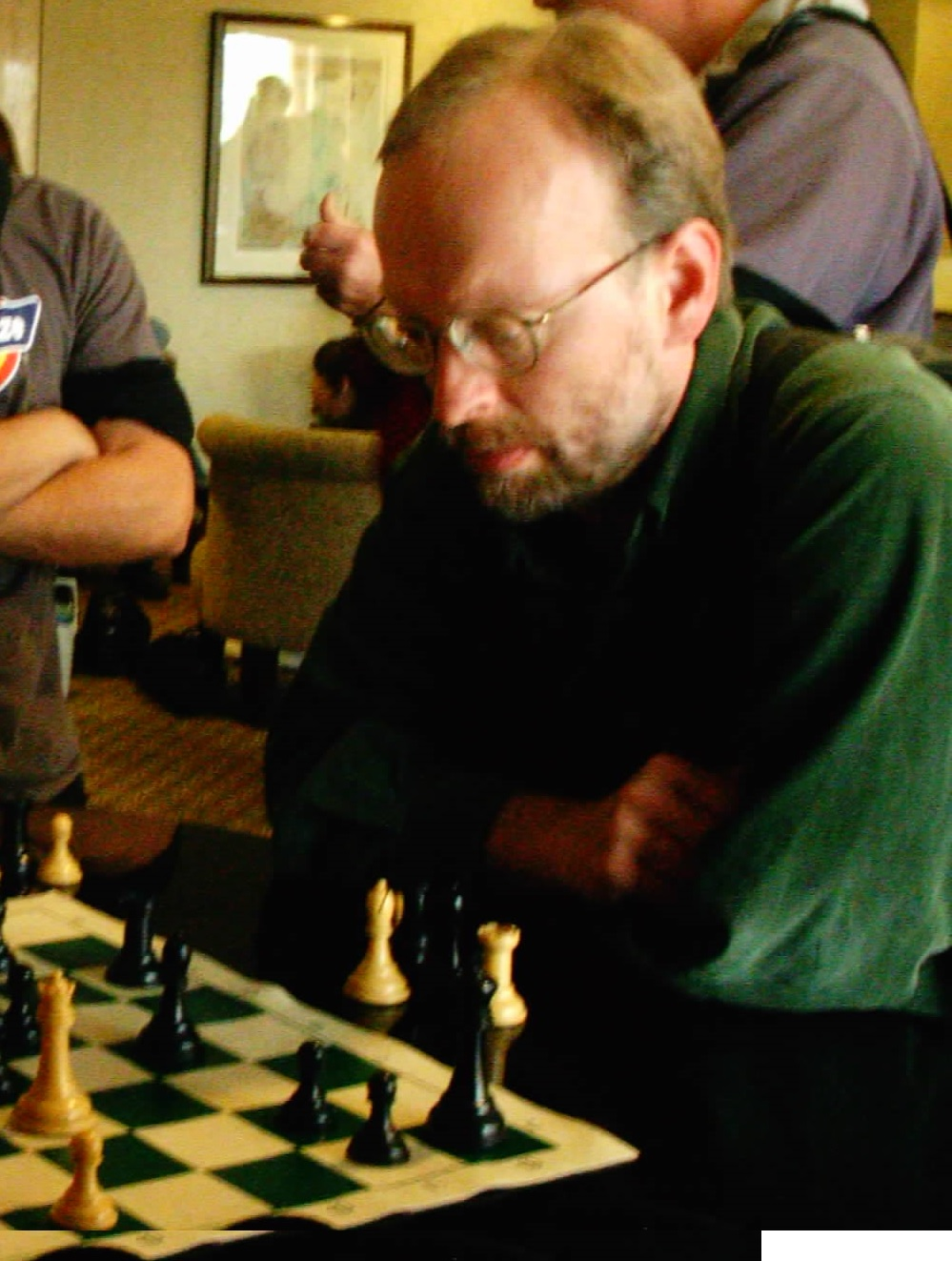
- Peters at the U.S. Amateur Team West chess tournament in 2004

Personal information
- Born: 10 February 1951 (age 75) Boston, Massachusetts

Chess career
- Title: International Master (1979)
- Peak rating: 2505 (January 1989)
- Peak ranking: No. 76 (January 1984)

John (Jack) Peters (born 1951) is an American International Master of chess. He currently teaches at University of Southern California and is known for his weekly Los Angeles Times chess column which ran from September 19, 1982, to November 28, 2010. He is a graduate of the Massachusetts Institute of Technology (MIT).
