= Neurochemical Research =

- Discipline: Neurochemistry, neuroscience
- Language: English
- Edited by: Henry Sershen

Publication details
- History: 1976–present
- Publisher: Springer Science+Business Media
- Frequency: Monthly
- Impact factor: 3.038 (2019)

Standard abbreviations
- ISO 4: Neurochem. Res.

Indexing
- CODEN: NEREDZ
- ISSN: 0364-3190 (print); 1573-6903 (web)
- LCCN: 76648349
- OCLC no.: 300184004

Links
- Journal homepage; Online archive

Neurochemical Research is a monthly peer-reviewed scientific journal covering neurochemistry. It was established in 1976 and is published by Springer Science+Business Media. As of 2024, the editor-in-chief is Henry Sershen (Nathan S. Kline Institute for Psychiatric Research).

The past editors-in-chief are Abel Lajtha (1976–2011) and Arne Schousboe of the University of Copenhagen (2011–24).

== Abstracting and indexing ==
The journal is abstracted and indexed in:

- Science Citation Index
- PubMed/MEDLINE
- Scopus
- EMBASE
- Chemical Abstracts Service
- EBSCO databases
- CAB International
- Academic OneFile
- Academic Search
- Aquatic Sciences and Fisheries Abstracts
- Biological Abstracts
- BIOSIS Previews
- CAB Abstracts
- ChemWeb
- CSA Environmental Sciences & Pollution Management Database
- Current Contents/ Life Sciences
- Elsevier Biobase
- EMBiology
- Global Health
- INIS Atomindex
- International Bibliography of Book Reviews
- International Bibliography of Periodical Literature

According to the Journal Citation Reports, the journal has a 2012 impact factor of 2.125.
