= International Society for Neurochemistry =

Professional scientific society

International Society for Neurochemistry (ISN)
- Formation: 1963
- Type: Professional society
- Location: Worldwide
- Members: 226 members (at the time of creation)
- Publication: Journal of Neurochemistry
- Website: www.neurochemistry.org

The International Society for Neurochemistry (ISN) is a professional society for neurochemists and neuroscientists throughout the world.

== History ==
The idea of an organization like the ISN began in the mid-1950s as scientists began to devote more attention to the discipline of neurochemistry. As the field became more popular, scientists recognized that an international association would be useful in helping to propagate research among themselves. In 1962, Jordi Folch Pi and Heinrich Waelesch proposed the formation of a Provisional Organizing Committee to such a society. The committee eventually came into being in 1963 and had an international membership composed of scientists in the field. Preliminary statutes were drafted in 1965 and finalized in 1967 as the Articles of Association of the ISN. At its creation, the society had 226 members.

The ISN began by organizing international and satellite meetings. In 1980, it began offering travel grants for young scientists to attend its meetings. Since that time, it has increased the number of awards it offers, funding travel grants as well as training programs, research in developing countries, and small, specialized medical conferences.

== Mission statement ==
The mission of the International Society for Neurochemistry is to:

- facilitate the worldwide advancement of neurochemistry and related neuroscience disciplines
- foster the education and development of neurochemists, particularly of young and emerging investigators
- disseminate information about neurochemistry and neurochemists' activities throughout the world

== Annual meeting ==
The society holds a bi-annual meeting, which generally is organized in collaboration with a regional society, either the European Society for Neurochemistry, the American Society for Neurochemistry, or the Asian Pacific Society for Neurochemistry.

== Publications ==
The official journal of the ISN is the Journal of Neurochemistry currently published by Wiley-Blackwell.

== Awards ==
The ISN funds various efforts to improve scientists' understanding of neurochemistry. The Committee for Aid and Education in Neurochemistry (CAEN) supports research endeavours conducted by young scientists or scientists from countries which offer limited support for neurochemical research. In the past, the committee has funded proposals for a variety of purposes, including visits to other laboratories, purchase of research equipment, and participation in scientific workshops.

Awards to individuals are overseen by the Travel Grants Committee. The ISN Travel Award Program allows young scientists to attend the ISN Biennial Meeting. The Young Scientist Lectureship Awards allow up to two young scientists to attend the Biennial Meeting and present a thirty-minute lecture on a subject in their speciality.

The ISN also supports research symposia through the ISN Conference Committee (ISN-CC). The committee funds small medical conferences that focus on recent research topics and that have an international focus among their attendees. Also under the jurisdiction of the Conference Committee is the ISN Schools Initiative, which schools in different areas of the world that train neurochemists.
