= Journal of Neurochemistry =

- Discipline: Neurochemistry
- Language: English
- Edited by: Andrew Lawrence

Publication details
- History: 1956–present
- Publisher: Wiley-Blackwell
- Frequency: 24/year
- Open access: Delayed, after 1 year; hybrid
- Impact factor: 3.7 (2024)

Standard abbreviations
- ISO 4: J. Neurochem.

Indexing
- CODEN: JONRA9
- ISSN: 0022-3042 (print); 1471-4159 (web)
- LCCN: 57003775
- OCLC no.: 714133882

Links
- Journal homepage; Online access; Online archive

The Journal of Neurochemistry is a biweekly peer-reviewed scientific journal covering all aspects of neurochemistry. It is published by Wiley-Blackwell on behalf of the International Society for Neurochemistry and was established in 1956. The editor-in-chief is Andrew J. Lawrence (University of Melbourne).

According to the Journal Citation Reports, the journal has a 2024 impact factor of 3.7.

== Abstracting and indexing ==
The journal is abstracted and indexed in:

- AGRICOLA
- Biological Abstracts
- BIOSIS Previews
- Chemical Abstracts Service
- Current Contents/Life Sciences
- EBSCO databases
- Elsevier BIOBASE
- Embase
- Index Medicus/MEDLINE/PubMed
- ProQuest databases
- PsycINFO
- Science Citation Index
- Scopus

== Editors-in-chief ==
The following persons have been editor-in-chief of the journal:

Eastern Hemisphere	Western Hemisphere
1956–1969 D. Richter	1956–1959 H. Waelsch
1970–1975 A.N. Davison	1959–1968 W.M. Sperry
1975–1979 L.L. Iversen	1969–1973 D.B. Tower
	1974–1977 L. Sokoloff
1980–1985 H.S. Bachelard	1978–1981 K. Suzuki
	1982–1985 W.T. Norton
1985–1991 K.F. Tipton	1986–1989 M.B. Lees
1991–1999 G.G. Lunt	1990–1995 A.A. Boulton
1999–2010 A.J. Turner	1996–2006 B. Collier
	2006–2012 S. Murphy
2011–2020 Jörg B. Schulz
since 2021 Andrew J. Lawrence
