= Neurochemistry =

Study of chemicals affecting the nervous system

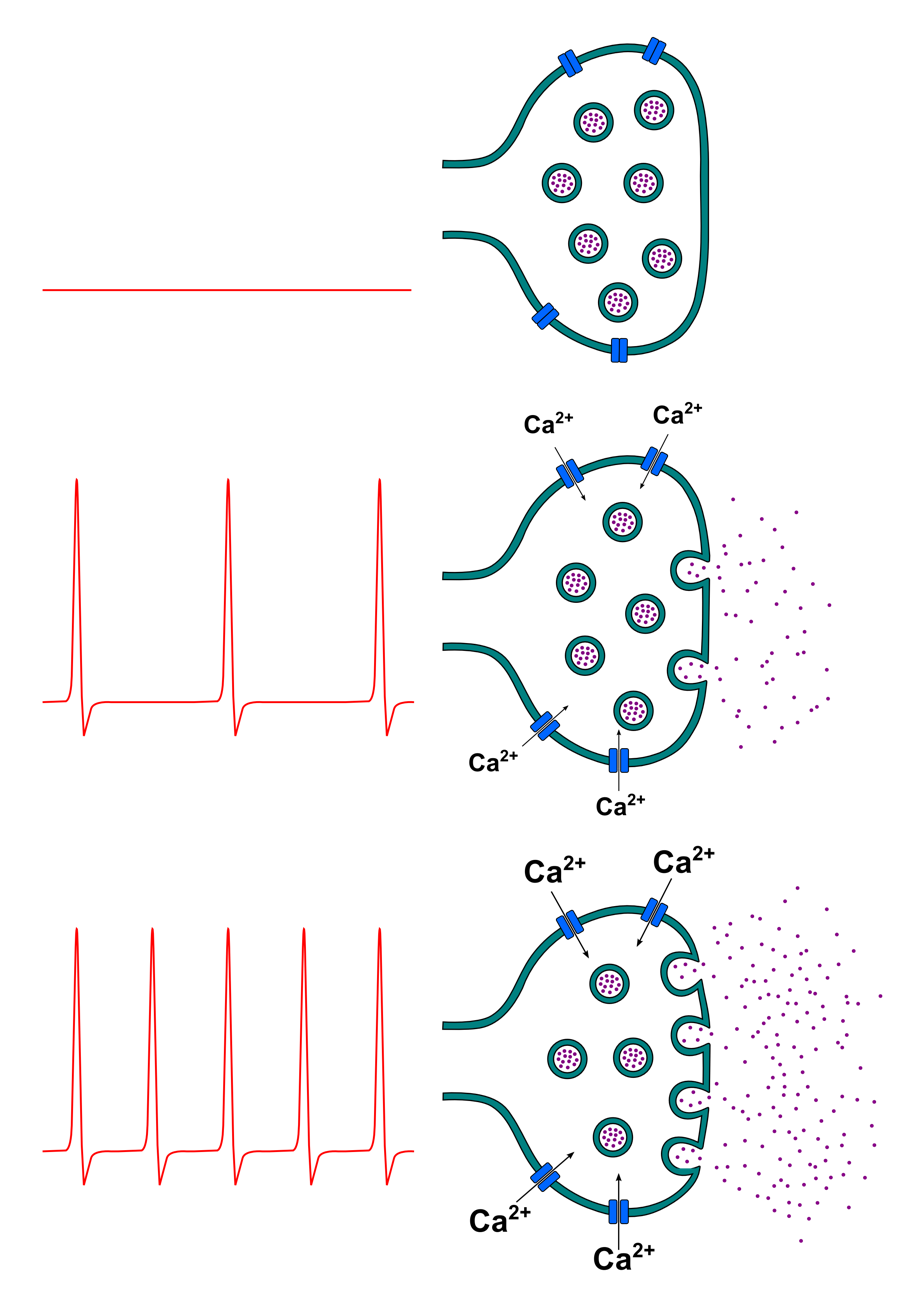
Diagram showing how the frequency of neuronal action potentials influences the amount of neurotransmitter released at a chemical synapse. Higher firing rates lead to increased vesicle fusion and chemical signaling within the synaptic cleft, processes central to neurochemistry.

Neurochemistry is the study of chemicals, including neurotransmitters and other molecules such as psychopharmaceuticals and neuropeptides, that control and influence the physiology of the nervous system. This particular field within neuroscience examines how neurochemicals influence the operation of neurons, synapses, and neural networks. Neurochemists analyze the biochemistry and molecular biology of organic compounds in the nervous system, and their roles in such neural processes including cortical plasticity, neurogenesis, and neural differentiation.

== History ==
While neurochemistry as a recognized science is relatively new, the idea behind neurochemistry has been around since the 18th century. Originally, the brain had been thought to be a separate entity apart from the peripheral nervous system. Beginning in 1856, there was a string of research that refuted that idea. The chemical makeup of the brain was nearly identical to the makeup of the peripheral nervous system. The first large leap forward in the study of neurochemistry came from Johann Ludwig Wilhelm Thudichum, who is one of the pioneers in the field of "brain chemistry." He was one of the first to hypothesize that many neurological illnesses could be attributed to an imbalance of chemicals in the brain. He was also one of the first scientists to believe that through chemical means, the vast majority of neurological diseases could be treated, if not cured.

Irvine Page (1901-1991) was an American psychologist that published the first major textbook focusing on neurochemistry in 1937. He had also established the first department that was solely devoted to the study of neurochemistry in 1928 at the Munich Kaiser Wilhelm Institute for Psychiatry.

Back in the 1930s, neurochemistry was mostly referred to as "brain chemistry" and was mostly devoted to finding different chemical species without directly proposing their specific roles and functions in the nervous system. The first biochemical pathology test for any brain disease can be attributed to Vito Maria Buscaino (1887-1978), a neuropsychiatrist who studied schizophrenia. He found that treating his patients' urine who had schizophrenia, extrapyramidal disorders, or amentia, with 5% silver nitrate produced a black precipitate linked with an abnormal level of amines. This became known as the "Buscaino Reaction."

In the 1950s, neurochemistry became a recognized scientific research discipline. The founding of neurochemistry as a discipline traces its origins to a series of "International Neurochemical Symposia", of which the first symposium volume published in 1954 was titled Biochemistry of the Developing Nervous System. These meetings led to the formation of the International Society for Neurochemistry and the American Society for Neurochemistry. These early gatherings discussed the tentative nature of possible neurotransmitter substances such as acetylcholine, histamine, substance P, and serotonin. By 1972, ideas were more concrete.

One of the first major successes in using chemicals to alter brain function was the L-DOPA experiment. In 1961, Walter Burkmayer injected L-DOPA into a patient with Parkinson's disease. Shortly after injection, the patient had a drastic reduction in tremors, and they were able to control their muscles in ways they hadn't been able to in a long time. The effect peaked within 2.5 hours and lasted approximately 24 hours.

== Neurotransmitters and neuropeptides ==
The most important aspect of neurochemistry is the neurotransmitters and neuropeptides that comprise the chemical activity in the nervous system. There are many neurochemicals that are integral for proper neural functioning.

The neuropeptide oxytocin, synthesized in magnocellular neurosecretory cells, plays an important role in maternal behavior and sexual reproduction, particularly before and after birth. It is a precursor protein that is processed proteolytically to activate the neuropeptide as its shorter form. It is involved in the letdown reflex when mothers breastfeed, uterine contractions, and the hypothalamic-pituitary-adrenal axis where oxytocin inhibits the release of cortisol and adrenocorticotropic hormone.

Glutamate, which is the most abundant neurotransmitter, is an excitatory neurochemical, meaning that its release in the synaptic cleft causes the firing of an action potential. GABA, or Gamma-aminobutyric acid, is an inhibitory neurotransmitter. It binds to the plasma membrane in the synapses of neurons, triggering the influx of negatively charged chloride ions and the efflux of positively charged potassium ions. This exchange of ions leads to the hyperpolarization of the transmembrane potential of the neuron, which is caused by this negative change.

Dopamine is a neurotransmitter with much importance in the limbic system which regulates emotional function regulation. Dopamine has many roles in the brain including cognition, sleep, mood, milk production, movement, motivation, and reward.

Serotonin is a neurotransmitter that regulates mood, sleep, and other roles of the brain. It is a peripheral signal mediator and is found in the gastrointestinal tract as well as in blood. Research also suggests that serotonin may play an important role in liver regeneration.

== Signalling ==
Neurochemistry is the study of the different types, structures, and functions of neurons and their chemical components. Chemical signaling between neurons is mediated by neurotransmitters, neuropeptides, hormones, neuromodulators, and many other types of signaling molecules. Many neurological diseases arise due to an imbalance in the brain's neurochemistry. For example, in Parkinson's Disease, there is an imbalance in the brain's level of dopamine. Medications include neurochemicals that are used to alter brain function and treat disorders of the brain. A typical neurochemist might study how the chemical components of the brain interact, neural plasticity, neural development, physical changes in the brain during disease, and changes in the brain during aging.

== Neurochemistry of PTSD ==
One of the major areas of research within neurochemistry is looking at how post-traumatic stress disorder alters the brain. Neurotransmitter level fluctuations can dictate whether a PTSD episode occurs and how long the episode lasts. Dopamine has less of an effect than norepinephrine. Different neurochemicals can affect different parts of the brain. This allows drugs to be used for PTSD to not have an undesired effect on other brain processes. An effective medication to help alleviate nightmares associated with PTSD is Prazosin.

== See also ==
- International Society for Neurochemistry
- List of neurochemists
- Molecular neuroscience
- Neuroendocrinology
- Neurogenesis
- Neuroimmunology
- Neuromodulation
- Neuropharmacology
- Neuroplasticity or Synaptic plasticity
- Signal transduction
