= Budapest 3rd constituency =

Electoral constituency in Hungary

Budapest 3rd constituency (District XII.)
- Constituency for the National Assembly
- Location of Budapest 03 within Budapest

- Location of Budapest within Hungary
- City: Budapest
- Electorate: 70,056 (2026)
- Major settlements: 12th District

Current constituency
- Created: 2011
- Party: Tisza Party
- Member: Péter Magyar
- Created from: Constituency no. 1; Constituency no. 2; Constituency no. 18
- Elected: 2026

The 3rd constituency of Budapest (Hungarian: Budapesti 03. számú országgyűlési egyéni választókerület) is one of the single-member constituencies of the National Assembly, the national legislature of Hungary. The constituency's standard abbreviation: Budapest 03. OEVK.

Since 2026, it has been represented by Péter Magyar of the Tisza Party, who also serves as Hungary's prime minister.

== Geography ==
The 3rd constituency is located in the western part of Buda.

The constituency borders the 4th constituency to the north, the 1st constituency to the east, the 2nd constituency to the south and the 2nd constituency of Pest County to the west.

=== List of districts ===
The constituency includes the following municipalities:

1. District XII.: Full part of the district.
2. District II.: Southern part (Víziváros, Országút and south of the Hűvösvölgyi út) of the district.

== History ==
The current 3rd constituency of Budapest was created in 2011 and contains parts of the pre-2011 1st, 2nd and 18th constituencies of Budapest. Its borders have not changed since its creation.

== Members ==
The constituency was first represented by János Fónagy of the Fidesz from 2014 to 2018. In the 2018 election Gergely Gulyás of the Fidesz was elected representative. He was succeeded by Miklós Hajnal of the Momentum Movement in 2022 (with United for Hungary support). In the 2026 election, Péter Magyar of the Tisza Party was elected representative.

Election	Member	Party	%	Ref.
2014	János Fónagy	Fidesz	46.78	
2018	Gergely Gulyás	Fidesz	42.71	
2022 (Note: Hajnal was a member of Momentum. He ran as a joint candidate of the United for Hungary electoral alliance during the 2022 parliamentary election.)	Miklós Hajnal	Momentum	48.42	
2026	Péter Magyar	TISZA	63.00	

== Election result ==
=== 2026 election ===
Result 2026
1. Péter Magyar, Tisza (63.7%)
2. Attila Steiner, Fidesz–KDNP (29.9%)
3. Dr. András Grundtner, Our Homeland (3.42%)
4. Zoltán Bürger, MKKP (1.64%)
5. Zsolt Gréczi, DK (1.27%)
6. György László Barabás, MMP-S (0.10%)

2026 parliamentary election: Budapest - 3rd constituency
Party	Candidate	Votes	%	±%
Tisza	Péter Magyar	43,112	63.67	New
Fidesz–KDNP	Attila Steiner	20,248	29.90	−11.36
Mi Hazánk	Dr. András Grundtner	2,315	3.42	+1.2
MKKP	Zoltán Bürger	1,112	1.64	−3.83
DK	Zsolt Gréczi	860	1.27	As EM
MMP–S	György László Barabás	67	0.10	New
Majority		22,864	33.77	
Turnout		68,049	86.76	▲4.70
Registered electors		73,114		
Tisza gain from United for Hungary		Swing		

=== 2022 election ===
Result 2022
1. Miklós Hajnal, United for Hungary (48.4%)
2. Dr. Balázs Fürjes, Fidesz–KDNP (41.8%)
3. Gergely Kovács, MKKP (5.50%)
4. Dr. András Grundtner, Our Homeland (2.20%)
5. Mária Hajdu, Independent (1.30%)
6. Dávid Jenei, MEMO (0.80%)

2022 parliamentary election: Budapest - 3rd constituency
Party	Candidate	Votes	%	±%
United for Hungary	Miklós Hajnal	25,323	48.42	
Fidesz–KDNP	Dr. Balázs Fürjes	21,872	41.82	−0.34
MKKP	Gergely Kovács	2,861	5.47	+2.65
Mi Hazánk	Dr. András Grundtner	1,163	2.22	New
Independent	Mária Hajdu	680	1.3	
MEMO	Dávid Jenei	398	0.76	New
Majority		3,451	6.6	
Turnout		52,830	82.06	▲0.46
Registered electors		64,378		
United for Hungary gain from Fidesz–KDNP		Swing	+2.9	

=== 2018 election ===
Result 2018
1. Gergely Gulyás, Fidesz–KDNP (42.7%)
2. Tamás Bauer, DK (39.0%)
3. Mária Hajdu, LMP (7.00%)
4. Márton Gyöngyösi, Jobbik (5.80%)
5. András Horváth, MKKP (2.80%)
6. Barnabás Áron Kádár, Momentum (2.70%)

2018 parliamentary election: Budapest - 3rd constituency
Party	Candidate	Votes	%	±%
Fidesz–KDNP	Gergely Gulyás	23,173	42.71	−4.07
DK	Tamás Bauer	21,176	39.03	as Unity
LMP	Mária Hajdu	3,787	6.98	−3.13
Jobbik	Márton Gyöngyösi	3,142	5.79	−0.33
MKKP	Gergely Kovács	1,530	2.82	New
Momentum	Barnabás Áron Kádár	1,449	2.67	New
Majority		1,997	3.68	
Turnout		54,848	81.6	▲5.08
Registered electors		67,215		
Fidesz–KDNP hold		Swing	-8.1	

=== 2014 election ===
Result 2014
1. Dr. János Vilmos Fónagy, Fidesz–KDNP (46.8%)
2. Tamás Bauer, Unity (35.0%)
3. Mária Hajdu, LMP (10.1%)
4. István Szávay, Jobbik (6.10%)
5. Frizsina Zsuzsanna Petre-Varga, SEM (1.00%)
6. Other parties (less than 1%) (2.00%)

2014 parliamentary election: Budapest - 3rd constituency
Party	Candidate	Votes	%	±%
Fidesz–KDNP	Dr. János Vilmos Fónagy	24,610	46.78	
Unity	Tamás Bauer	18,414	35.0	
LMP	Mária Hajdu	5,321	10.11	
Jobbik	István Szávay	3,220	6.12	
SEM	Melinda Mile	479	0.91	
4K!	Attila Bartha	269	0.51	
KTI	Ferenc Szuna	157	0.3	
FKGP	Dr. Julianna Erzsébet Németh	139	0.26	
Majority		6,196	11.78	
Turnout		53,144	76.52	
Registered electors		69,452		
Fidesz–KDNP win (new seat)				
