= World Science Forum =

Conference series on global science policy

The World Science Forum (WSF) is an international conference series on global science policy. First held in 2003, it is organised biannually in Budapest, Hungary.

The WSF traces back its origin to the World Conference on Science, organised by UNESCO and ICSU and hosted by the Hungarian Academy of Sciences in Budapest, Hungary, in 1999. The impact of the World Conference on Science carried onwards, leading UNESCO, in 2001, to create an annual World Science Day for Peace and Development, celebrated each November 10 since 2002.

The Hungarian Academy of Sciences (HAS), supported by UNESCO and ICSU, held the first World Science Forum in November 2003, with the final day of the three-day event falling on November 10 – the second annual World Science Day for Peace and Development. HAS continued the November WSF on a biannual basis, held in Budapest for the first five WSFs, until discussions at the 5th (2011) WSF led to a decision to alternate between Budapest and another host country thereafter, starting with the 6th (2013) WSF in Rio de Janeiro, Brazil.

The World Science Forum aims at being the "Davos of Science" and achieving the same global strategic impact on science and science policy as the World Economic Forum does in the field of global economic policy.

== Origin, vision and mission ==
By the end of the 20th century, science and knowledge became essential parts of Mankind's everyday lives. Scientific knowledge is not only the result of Humanity's inherent curiosity and scientific endeavor, it is a powerful means of understanding human nature, society, and the Nature in which humans live. Advance in science is a major contributor to society's socio-economic development, the global welfare of humankind, man's relation to Nature, and the quality of life.

In past centuries the predominant role of science was the production of new knowledge to satisfy the curiosity of the human mind. In recent years, the role of science has undergone changes, as scientific inquiry has increasingly become the motor of development in society. By the end of the 20th century, science had taken on a number of new roles. These novel roles may – and should – contribute in a decisive manner to the daily life of humankind in the 21st century.

In spite of its spectacular development and new opportunities, the science of 21st century faces wavering confidence, unseen dilemmas and new questions. These problems can be solved only if the main procedures and users of knowledge are able to reach common ground for the new roles of knowledge and science in 21st century's global society.

These issues were discussed at the World Conference on Science, from 26 June to 1 July 1999, in Budapest, Hungary. The conference was organised by UNESCO and the International Council for Science (ICSU), with the participation of over 2000 delegates from 186 countries.

As a follow-up to the World Conference on Science, the Hungarian Academy of Sciences (HAS), in partnership with UNESCO and ICSU, initiated a unique forum series for a much needed genuine debate and hopefully lasting interaction between the scientific community and society. Three members of HAS played a key role in establishing the World Science Forum series: István Láng, the organiser of the 1999 World Conference of Science; Balázs Gulyás, the founding director of the WSF series; and E. Sylvester Vizi, the then president of HAS. At present the President of World Science Forum is Professor Tamas Freund, President of the Hungarian Academy of Sciences.

Mission of WSF

– To provide major stakeholders with a global forum for dialogue on science and its role and responsibility in the 21st century.

– To better understand and promote the need for science and scientific advice in political and economic decision-making.

– To exchange views and ideas on how to communicate science and its basic values to the society at large and to the various stakeholder groups.

== Organisers ==
The main organising institution of the WSF is the Hungarian Academy of Sciences, in close partnership with UNESCO and ICSU. The preparatory activities of the Forum are led by a Governing Board, helped by an international Steering Committee.

== Patrons ==
Patrons of the WSF are the President of Hungary, the Director-General of UNESCO, the President of ICSU, and the President of the European Commission.

== International Steering Committee ==
The Steering Committee of the WSF consists of an international group of scientists and science politicians. Its chair is József Pálinkás, president of the Hungarian Academy of Sciences. Members of the steering committee include Sir Brian Heap, chairman EASAC; Gretchen Kalonji, assistant director-general for Natural Sciences, United Nations Educational Scientific and Cultural Organization (UNESCO); Yuan-Tseh Lee, president, International Council for Science (ICSU), Nobel Laureate; Alan I. Leshner, chief executive officer, American Association for the Advancement of Science (AAAS); Connie Nshemereirwe, co-chair of the Global Young Academy; Jacob Palis, president, Brazilian Academy of Sciences, president, The Academy of Sciences for the Developing World (TWAS); Werner Arber, Nobel Laureate; Ahmed Zewail, director, Physical Biology Center for Ultrafast Science and Technology, Nobel Laureate; Ichiro Kanazawa, president, Science Council of Japan; Sir George Radda, chairman, Biomedical Research Council; Lidia Brito, director, Division for Science Policy and Sustainable Development, Natural Sciences Sector, UNESCO; Deliang Chen, executive director, International Council for Science (ICSU); Vaughan Turekian, American Association for the Advancement of Science (AAAS).

== Governing bodies ==
The chairman of the Governing Board of WSF is József Pálinkás, president of the Hungarian Academy of Sciences and president of World Science Forum. The executive director of the WSF is Balázs Gulyás, the executive secretaries are Gergely Böhm and Ádám Kégler.

== Impact ==
The conference has been called an important element in the dialogue between scientists and policy makers. It has also been described as an important event for Budapest.

== List of forums ==
Inspiration
Year	Conference	Theme	Location	Ref.
1999	World Conference on Science	Science for the Twenty-First Century: a New Commitment	Budapest, Hungary	

Forums
Year	Forum	Theme	Location	Ref.
2003	1st	Science and Society	Budapest, Hungary	
2005	2nd	Knowledge, Ethics and Responsibility	Budapest, Hungary	
2007	3rd	Investing in Knowledge: Investing in the Future	Budapest, Hungary	
2009	4th	Knowledge and the Future	Budapest, Hungary	
2011	5th	A New Era of Global Science	Budapest, Hungary	
2013	6th	Science for Global Sustainable Development	Rio de Janeiro, Brazil	
2015	7th	The Enabling Power of Science	Budapest, Hungary	
2017	8th	Science for Peace	Dead Sea, Jordan	
2019	9th	Science, Ethics and Responsibility	Budapest, Hungary	
2022	10th	Science for Social Justice	Cape Town, South Africa	
2024	11th	Science and Policy Interface at a Time of Global Transformations	Budapest, Hungary	
