= Balázs Gulyás =

Hungarian neurobiologist

Balázs Gulyás (born 26 June 1956) is a Hungarian neurobiologist.

== Personalia ==
Gulyás is a Hungarian born neurobiologist based, since 1988, in Stockholm, working at the Karolinska Institute and while keeping his professorship at the Karolinska Institutet in Stockholm, since 2012 he has been one of the founding professors of the Imperial College London-Nanyang Technological University's Lee Kong Chian School of Medicine in Singapore where he is responsible for Translational Neuroscience and for the university's Cognitive Neuroimaging Centre CONIC (https://www.ntu.edu.sg/conic). Also, since 1 May 2023 he has been the President of the Hungarian Research Network HUN-REN.

At NTU, he is the founding director of the university's Centre for Neuroimaging Research at NTU (CeNReN). He has also a visiting professorship at the Division of Brain Sciences, Department of Medicine, Imperial College London. Gulyás received his university degrees from Semmelweis University from which he graduated as Doctor of Medicine (MD) and from the Catholic University of Leuven where he obtained a BA (1982) and an MA (1984) in Philosophy (Higher Institute of Philosophy) and a PhD in neurobiology (1988, Faculty of Medicine). He pursued studies in physics at Budapest's Eotvos Lorand University (1976–1981). In 2000 he obtained his BD (bachelor of divinity) degree in theology from Heythrop College / the University of Stockholm and in 2022 a CHEMS (mathematics) from the Open University.

== Work ==
Gulyás' main research interest is in basic neuroscience, neurology, psychiatry, functional neuroimaging and cognitive neuroscience. He published fifteen books, over 35 book-chapters and over 300 research papers in peer-reviewed scientific journals .

He was a guest professor, among others, of the Collège de France, and is a faculty member of the Parmenides Foundation. He is a member of the Hungarian Academy of Sciences (since 1995), the Academia Europaea (where he is a member of the council and the board of trustees) and the Royal Belgian Academy of Medicine. He co-founded the World Science Forum series. He has been a member of the council (2010–2016) and the Board of Trustees (2014–2018) of Academia Europaea where he is now the Chair of the Section of Physiology and Neuroscience .

== Publications ==
His books include:

- Gulyás, B. (ed.) The Brain-Mind Problem. Philosophical and Neurophysiological Approaches. Leuven and Assen: Leuven University Press and Van Gorcum, 1987. p. XI+119. ISBN 90-6186-246-9
- Gulyás, B., Ottoson, D., and Roland, P. E. (eds.) Functional Organization of the Human Visual Cortex. Oxford: Pergamon Press, 1993. p. 391. ISBN 0-08-042004-4.
- Gulyás, B. and Müller-Gärtner, H. W. (eds.) Positron emission tomography: A critical assessment of recent trends. Dordrecht: Kluwer Academic Publisher, 1998. p. 482. ISBN 0-7923-5091-X
- Pléh, C., Kovács, G. and Gulyás, B. (eds.) Cognitive Neuroscience. Budapest, Osiris Press, 2003. 832 p. ISBN 963-389-313-5.
- Kraft, E., Gulyás, B. and Pöppel, E. (eds.) Neural Correlates of Thinking. Springer Verlag, 2008. ISBN 978-3-540-68042-0 ,
- Vasbinder, J.W. and Gulyás, B. Cultural Patterns and Neurocognitive Circuits. World Scientific, 2016. Pp. 212. ISBN 978-981-3147-48-5
