= József Hámori =

Hungarian biologist and politician (1932–2021)

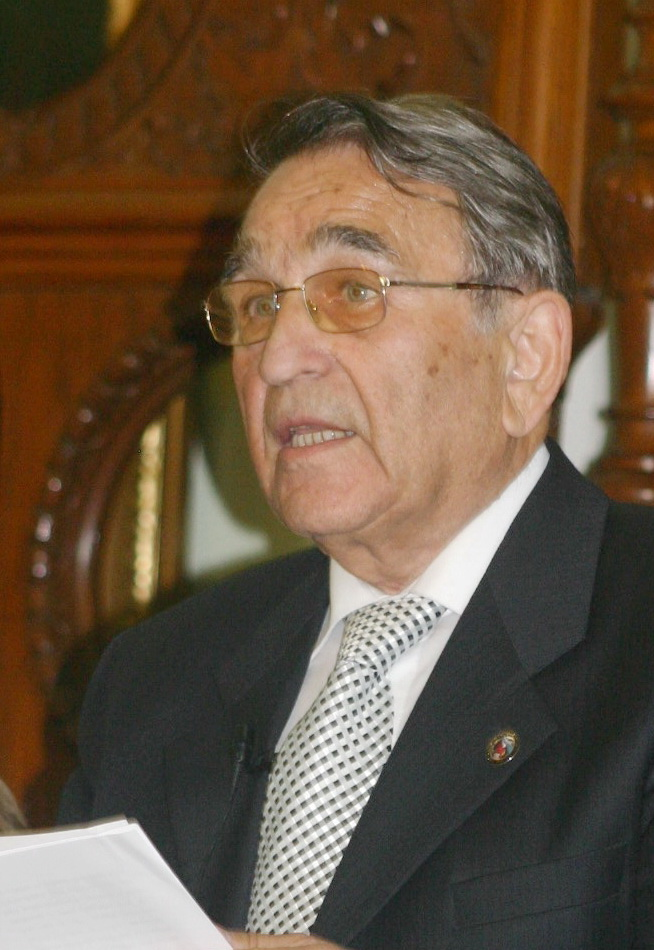
- Image: László Horváth

Minister of Culture
- In office 8 July 1998 – 31 December 1999
- Preceded by: office created
- Succeeded by: Zoltán Rockenbauer

Personal details
- Born: 20 March 1932; Fegyvernek, Hungary
- Died: 1 May 2021 (aged 89)
- Political party: Independent
- Spouse: Anna Tompa
- Children: 4
- Profession: biologist, politician
- Scientific career
- Theses: A kisagykéreg ultrastruktúrája (1965); Líthium hatás vizsgálata Rana esculenta buroktalan és burokban levő petéin (c. 1960)

József Hámori (20 March 1932 – 1 May 2021) was a Hungarian biologist and politician, who served as Minister of Culture between 1998 and 1999. He was a member of the Batthyány Society of Professors.

== Publications ==
=== Books ===
- Mi a neurobiológia? (1976)
- Idegsejttől a gondolatig (1982)
- Nem tudja a jobbkéz, mit csinál a bal (1985)
- Veszélyeztetett értelem (1988)
- Az emberi agy aszimmetriái (1999)
- Agy, hit, számítógép (co-author, 2004)

=== Scientific works ===
- The Inductive Role of Presynaptic Axons in the Development of Postsynaptic Spines (Brain Res., 1973)
- Specific Antibody-fragments Against the Postsynaptic Web (Nature, co-author, 1973)
- Triadic Synaptic Arrangements and Their Possible Significance in the Lateral Geniculate Nucleus of the Monkey (Brain Res., co-author, 1974)
- Presynaptic Dendrites and Perikarya in Deafferented Cerebellar Cortex (Procl. National Academy of Science, co-author, 1982)
- Immunogold Electron Microscopic Demonstration of Glutamate and GABA in Normal and Deafferented Cerebellar Cortex: Correlation Between Transmitter Content and Synaptic Vesicle Size (Journal of Histochem. and Cytochem., co-author, 1990)
- Metabotrop Glutamate Receptor Type 1a Expressing Unipolar Brush Cells in the Cerebellar Cortex of Different Species: a Comparative Quantitative Study (Journal of Neuroscientific Research, co-author, 1999)
- Az emberi agy plaszticitása (Magyar Tudomány, 2005)

== Honours and awards ==
- 1972 Academy Prize
- 1990 Member of the Hungarian Academy of Sciences
- 1992 Member of Academia Europaea
- 1994 Széchenyi Prize
- 1996 Grastyán Prize
- 1999 UNESCO Einstein Gold Medal
- 2001 Ipolyi Arnold Prize

Political offices
| Preceded by office created | Minister of Culture; 1998–1999 | Succeeded by Zoltán Rockenbauer |
