= Sashegy =

Hill and neighbourhood in Budapest, Hungary

Coordinates: 47°28′52″N 19°0′59″E

Sashegy (aka Sas-hegy, German: Adlerberg; lit. "Eagle Hill") is a hill and neighbourhood in Budapest, Hungary. It is a green, upper-middle-class area in Buda with expensive family homes. Administratively Sashegy is divided between the 11th and the 12th districts of Budapest.

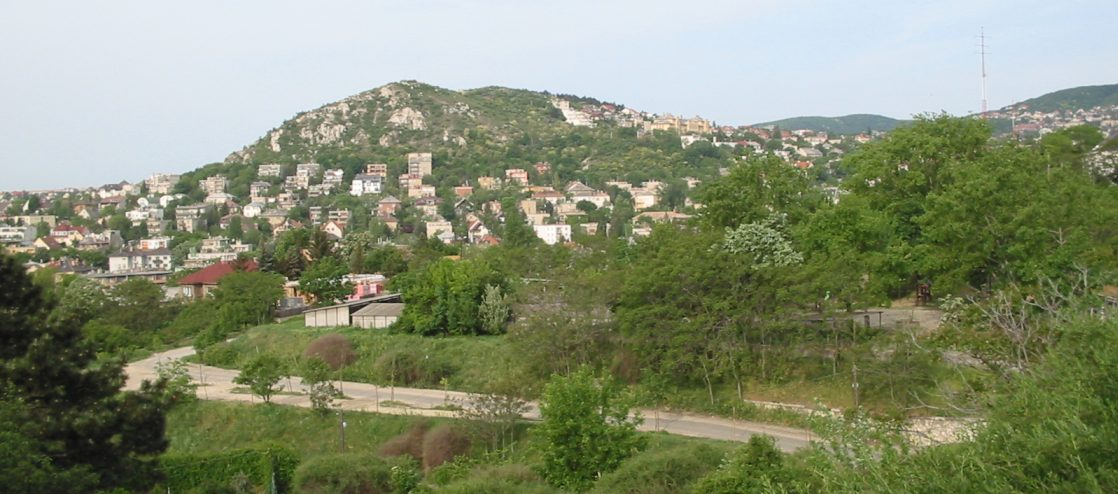
View to Sashegy from Gellérthegy

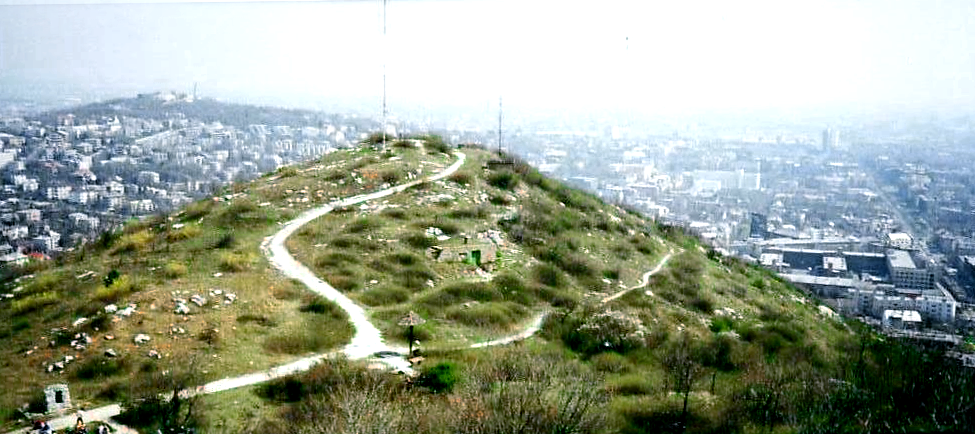
Sashegy, View to Gellérthegy (on the left)

== Maps ==
- The streets on Google Maps
- Near view on Google

The borders of Sashegy are: Hegyalja út from Dayka Gábor utca - Kálló esperes utca - Hegyalja út - Budaörsi út - Brassó út - Dayka Gábor utca until Hegyalja út.

== Name ==
The present-day name was given to the hill in 1847 when the geographical features of the Buda Hills were renamed under the initiative of Hungarian philologist Gábor Döbrentei. Sashegy is the translation of the former German name, Adlerberg. According to a popular legend a parade was held on 2 September 1686 by the victorious Christian armies after capturing Buda Castle from the Ottoman Turks. During the parade eagles flew from the hill nearby towards the castle.

Medieval Hungarian names were also recorded. At first the hill was called Királyhegy (lit. King's Hill) in the 13th century because Hungarian kings usually took a rest here during hunting trips. Later it became a church property under the names Paphegy, Baráthegy or Istenhegy (lit. Parson's Hill, Friar's Hill or God's Hill). The Ottomans called the hill Muhanek in the 16th and 17th century.

== History ==
After the Ottoman occupation vineyards were planted on the lower slopes of the hill. German colonists played an important part in the rebirth of viticulture in the Buda Hills. During the 18th–19th centuries Adlerberg, as it was then called, was part of the Buda-Sashegy Wine Region. According to the 1789 land register of Buda the vineyards on Adlerberg covered 0.6 square kilometres (0.23 sq mi). The Buda-Sashegyi Kadarka wine, made from Black Kadarka, earned a reputation throughout Europe. The vineyards of Sashegy were destroyed in 1890 by phylloxera. After the plague viticulture was supplanted by the production of stone fruit. The lower slopes were planted with orchards, mainly peach-trees, while the rocky upper areas of the hill remained barren at all times.

At the beginning of the 20th century, a military complex was built at the foot of the hill (now Petőfi Barracks). The first great building on the hill itself was the college of the Congregation of Notre Dame de Sion, established in 1930. Suburbanization only began in the 1940s and 1950s when family homes were built in place of the old orchards. In 1944 concrete bunkers were built on the top of the hill, and many new villas were destroyed during the siege of Budapest in 1944–45. The present stock of houses mainly comes from the last decades of the 20th century. The natural upper areas were preserved with the establishment of the nature reserve in 1958. According to the 1990 census Sashegy had 9030 inhabitants (7969 in the 11th and 1061 in the 12th district part).

== Streets ==
The process of suburbanization was accelerated by designation of new streets across the neighbourhood. The main roads around foot of the hill followed much older pathways like the old Sashegyi út (now Hegyalja út) which connected the valley under Gellért Hill with Farkasrét.

The majority of the new streets were established in the period between 1928 and 1941. The most important among them was Miasszonyunk útja (now Meredek utca), leading towards the college, in 1930.

== Education ==
The only school in the neighbourhood is Arany János Elementary and Secondary School (1 Meredek utca, 12th District). The huge, yellow Neo-Baroque building on the hillside was built in 1930 by the Congregation of Notre-Dame de Sion. It was originally a college of girls with French as the language of education. The school was secularized after the Communist takeover in 1948. The Arany János Elementary and Secondary School was established in 1954.

== Nature reserve ==
The Sas-hegy Nature Reserve belongs to the Danube-Ipoly National Park. The 30-acre (120,000 m^{2}) area on the top of the hill was placed under protection in 1958. It was one of the first nature reserves of Hungary, protecting the limestone landscape and its special flora and fauna. The top of the hill is 257 m (843 ft) high and offers a scenic panorama towards Buda Castle, Gellért Hill and the districts of Buda. The park service maintains a visitor center and a 2,350 m-long (7,710 ft) circular trail, displaying the most important natural features of the reserve.

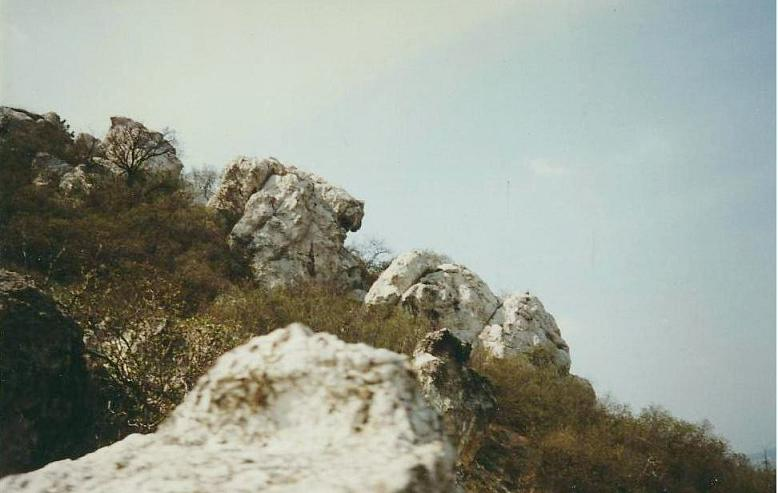
The Bear Rock (Medve-szikla)

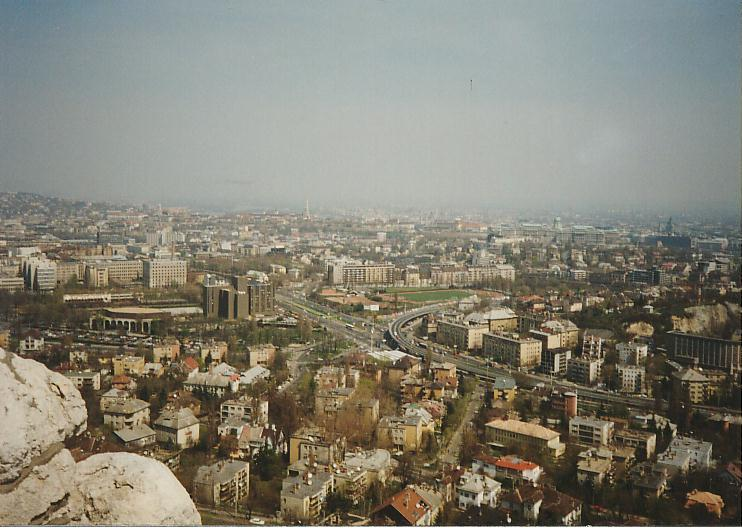
View from Bear Rock to the BAH-interchange

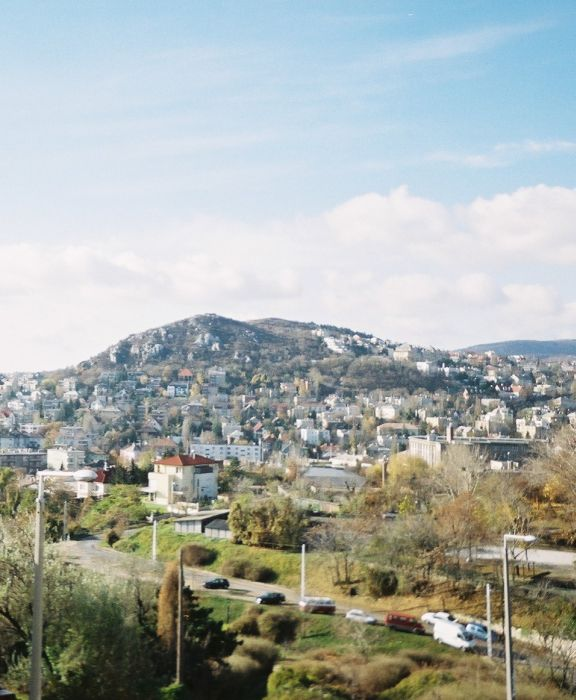
View from Gellért Hill

== See also ==
- Naphegy
- Gellérthegy
