= Zoltán Rockenbauer =

Hungarian ethnologist and politician

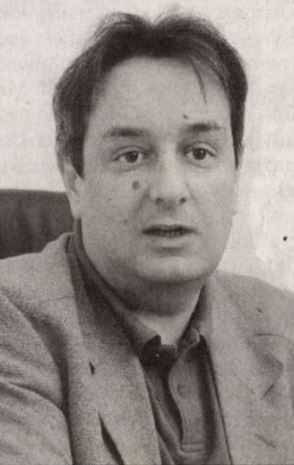
- Rockenbauer in 2010

Minister of Culture of Hungary
- In office 1 January 2000 – 27 May 2002
- Preceded by: József Hámori
- Succeeded by: Gábor Görgey

Personal details
- Born: 4 January 1960 (age 65); Győr, People's Republic of Hungary
- Political party: Fidesz
- Spouse: Ágnes Kilincsányi
- Profession: ethnologist, art historian, politician

Zoltán Rockenbauer (born 4 January 1960) is a Hungarian ethnologist, art historian and politician, who served as Minister of Culture between 2000 and 2002. His father was the hiker and film editor Pál Rockenbauer, the creator of the Hungarian television nature films.

== Personal life ==
He is married. His wife is Ágnes Kilincsányi.

== Honours ==
- Ordre national du Mérite, Knight (Chevalier) (1999)
- Ordre national de la Légion d'honneur, Grand Officer (Grand Officier) (2001)

== Publications ==
=== Monographs ===
- Ta’aroa – Tahiti mitológia. A primitív népek lírai költészete. Budapest, 1994, Századvég; 2002, Osiris. 300 o. ISBN 963-389-241-4
- Nemzetpolitika '88–'98. (Társszerzők: Csaba Lőrincz, Zsolt Németh, Viktor Orbán). Budapest, 1998, Osiris.
- Kotta és paletta. Művek, művészek, múzsák. Budapest, 2001. Corvina – Európai Utas. ISBN 963-13-5147-5
- Márffy és múzsái. Budapest, 2003, Ernst Múzeum. ISBN 963-210-610-5
- Márffy. . Életműkatalógus / Catalogue raisonné / Complete work. Budapest/Paris, 2006, Makláry Artworks. [with English and French summary] ISBN 963-229-967-1
- Márffy. Budapest, 2008, Corvina. (Magyar mesterek). ISBN 978-963-13-5779-0
- A halandó múzsa. Ady özvegye, Babits szereleme, Márffy hitvese. Budapest, 2009, Noran. ISBN 978-963-283-010-0
- A másik Csinszka. Márffy Ödön múzsája / Other Csinszka. Muse of Ödön Márffy. Debrecen, 2010, Modem. [Ed. bilingual: Hungarian and English]. ISBN 978-963-88439-5-1
- Márffy és Csinszka. Márffy Ödön festészete a két világháború között. / The paintings of Ödön Márffy between the First and Second World War. Balatonfüred: Vaszary Villa, 2010. [Ed. bilingual: Hungarian and English]. ISBN 978-963-89091-0-7
- Dialogue de Fauves /Dialoog onder Fauves / Dialog among Fauves. Hungarian Fauvism (1904–1914). Ed. Gergely Barki, Zoltán Rockenbauer. Bruxelles – Milano, Silvana editorale, 2010. [Ed. trilingual: French, English, Dutch]. ISBN 978-88-366-1872-9
- Matzon Ákos – Relief. Budapest, Faur Zsófia Galéria és Könyvkiadó. 2012. [Ed. trilingual: Hungarian, English, German]. ISBN 9786155206023
- Die Acht. Ungarns Highway in die Moderne. Ed. Gergely Barki, Evelyn Benesch, Zoltán Rockenbauer. Wien, Deutscher Kunstverlag, 2012. ISBN 9783422071575
- Allegro Barbaro, Béla Bartók et la modernité hongroise 1905–1920. Ed. Gergely Barki, Claire Bernardi, Zoltán Rockenbauer. Paris, Édition Hazan – Musée d’Orsay. 2013. ISBN 9782754107129
- Erik Mátrai. Orb 02.2. Chiesa di San Lio, Venezia. Budapest, Műcsarnok–Kunsthalle. 2013. ISBN 9789639506701
- Apacs művészet. Adyzmus a festészetben és a kubista Bartók (1900–1919). Budapest, Noran–Libro, 2014. ISBN 9786155274947
- Deske.hu. Ed.: Rockenbauer Zoltán, Váli Dezső. Budapest, Műcsarnok–Kunsthalle. 2014. ISBN 9789639506756

=== Exhibitions ===
- Márffy Ödön és múzsái. Ernst Múzeum, 2003. (conception)
- Magyar Vadak Párizstól Nagybányáig (1904–1914). Magyar Nemzeti Galéria, 2006. (member of the scientific group preparing the exhibition)
- A másik Csinszka. Márffy Ödön múzsája. Debrecen, MODEM, 25 February – 23 May 2010 (curator)
- Szín, fény, ragyogás. Budapest, KOGART ház, 1 April – 1 August 2010 (curator)
- Márffy és Csinszka. Márffy Ödön festészete a két világháború között./ The paintings of Ödön Márffy between the First and Second World War. Balatonfüred, Vaszary Villa: 20 November 2010 – 24 April 2011 (curator)
- Dialogue de Fauves. Bruxelles, L’Hôtel de Ville: 2 December 2010 – 21 March 2011 (co-curator)
- Nyolcak. Cézanne és Matisse bűvöletében. Centenáriumi kiállítás. The Eight (Nyolcak). Pécs, Janus Pannonius Múzeum: 10 December 2010 – 27 March 2011 (co- curator)
- Nyolcak. The Eight (Nyolcak). Budapest, Museum of Fine Arts, 17 May – 16 September 2011 (co-curator) – virtual tour
- Die Acht. A Nyolcak. Ungarns Highway in die Moderne. Wien, Bank Austria Kunstforum: 12 September 2012. – 2 December 2012. (co-curator)
- Allegro Barbaro. Béla Bartók et la modernité hongroise (1905–1920). Paris, Musée d'Orsay, 15 October 2013. – 5 January 2014. (co-curator)
- Váli Dezső: deske.hu. Budapest, Műcsarnok–Kunsthalle: 12 December 2014. – 1 February 2015. február 1. (curator) – virtual tour

Political offices
Preceded by József Hámori	Minister of Culture; 2000–2002	Succeeded by Gábor Görgey
