= Zoltán Pokorni =

Hungarian educator and politician

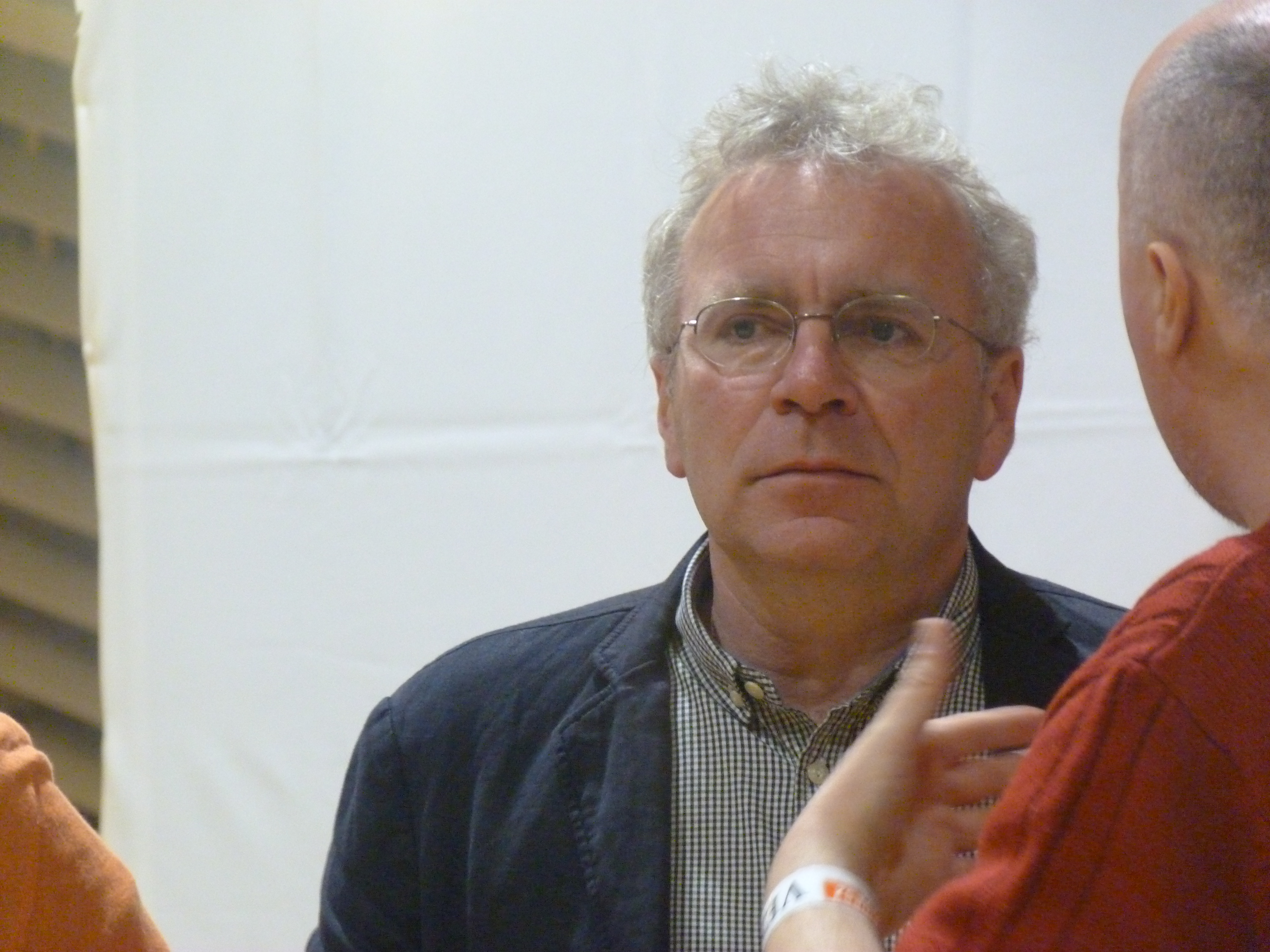

Minister of Education of Hungary
- In office 8 July 1998 – 15 July 2001
- Preceded by: Bálint Magyar
- Succeeded by: József Pálinkás

Member of the National Assembly
- In office 28 June 1994 – 5 May 2014

Mayor of Hegyvidék
- In office 1 October 2006 – 1 October 2024
- Preceded by: György Mitnyan
- Succeeded by: Gergely Kovács

Personal details
- Born: 10 January 1962 (age 63); Budapest, Hungary
- Political party: Fidesz
- Spouse: Andrea Beck
- Children: Benedek Donát; Ágoston Jakab; Ábel Boldizsár; Barnabás Vince
- Profession: educator, politician

Zoltán Pokorni (born 10 January 1962) is a Hungarian educator and politician, who served as Minister of Education between 1998 and 2001.

He finished his studies in the Eötvös Loránd University in 1987. After that he worked as a teacher for the Toldy Ferenc Grammar School. He was a founding member of the Association of Young Educators and the Democratic Union of Educators (PDSZ). He was the spokesman of PDSZ until 1993. He also took part in the negotiations of the Opposition Round Table. During that time he was the chief editor of Rádió. He joined Fidesz in 1993.

Pokorni became a member of the National Assembly of Hungary in 1994. He was a deputy chairman of the Committee of Education, Research, Youth and Sport between 1994 and 1998. He served as leader of Fidesz's parliamentary group from 1997 to 1998.

After Fidesz won the 1998 elections, the new prime minister Viktor Orbán appointed him Minister of Education. During his ministership, the integration of the higher education systems were finalized, the student loan system established and tuition was abolished. He was elected as the President of Fidesz, succeeding László Kövér. As a result, he resigned from his ministerial position. After Fidesz lost the 2002 elections he once again became the leader of the parliamentary group.

In July 2002 after it was exposed that his father, János Pokorni, worked for the Ministry of the Interior as a III/III agent, Pokorni resigned from his position at the party and also as leader of the parliamentary group. He returned to politics in May 2003, when he was elected as one of the vice presidents of Fidesz. He held this office until December 2015. He gained a seat on the 2006 elections again. He did not take on the function of group leader because of his conflicts with the party leadership. Pokorni was elected as mayor of the XII District of Budapest (Hegyvidék) in 2006. He was re-elected in 2010, 2014 and 2019.

== Personal life ==
Married, his wife is Andrea Beck psychologist. They have four children: Benedek Donát (1992), Ágoston Jakab (1996), Ábel Boldizsár (1999) and Barnabás Vince (2001).

National Assembly of Hungary
Preceded by József Szájer	Leader of the Fidesz parliamentary group 1997–1998	Succeeded by József Szájer
Preceded by József Szájer	Leader of the Fidesz parliamentary group 2002	Succeeded by János Áder
Political offices
Preceded by Bálint Magyar	Minister of Education; 1998–2001	Succeeded by József Pálinkás
Preceded by László Kovács	Leader of the Opposition; 2002	Succeeded by János Áder
Party political offices
Preceded by László Kövér	President of Fidesz; 2001–2002	Succeeded by János Áder
