= Bálint Magyar =

Hungarian politician

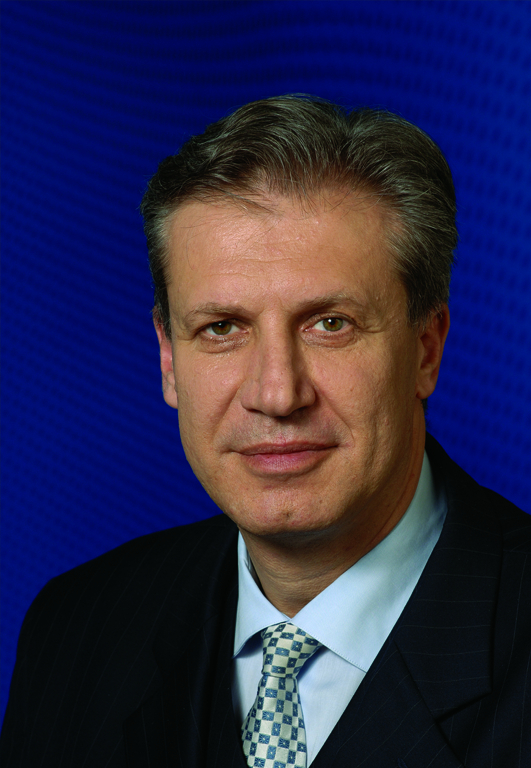

Minister of Education of Hungary
- In office 27 May 2002 – 9 June 2006
- Preceded by: József Pálinkás
- Succeeded by: István Hiller (Education and Culture)
- In office 1 January 1996 – 8 July 1998
- Preceded by: Gábor Fodor
- Succeeded by: Zoltán Pokorni

Personal details
- Born: 15 November 1952 (age 73) Budapest, Hungary
- Party: SZDSZ
- Spouse: Róza Hodosán
- Children: Annamária
- Profession: politician

Bálint Magyar (born as János Magyar; 15 November 1952) is a Hungarian politician, who served as Minister of Education between 1996 and 1998 and between 2002 and 2006. He was a founding member of the Alliance of Free Democrats.

His book Magyar polip – A posztkommunista maffiaállam (2013) describes modern Hungary as a mafia state. An English translation of the book, Post-Communist Mafia State: The Case of Hungary, was published in 2016.

== Family ==
His paternal grandparents were the journalist Elek Magyar and Berta Kürthy, who was granddaughter of the 19th-century Hungarian prime minister Bertalan Szemere. His father is the writer and theatre manager Bálint Magyar Sr. His mother, Olga Siklós (b. Schwarcz), was born to a Jewish family in Kolozsvár. Bálint has a sister, Fruzsina who is married to Imre Mécs. Bálint Magyar's is married to Róza Hodosán, a former member of the National Assembly of Hungary. They have a daughter, Annamária.

== Career ==
He earned a degree in history from the Faculty of Humanities of the Eötvös Loránd University in 1977. Magyar is a Research Fellow at the Financial Research Institute (since 2010) with a doctoral degree in political economy (1980) from Faculty of Law of the Eötvös Loránd University in Budapest. He has published and edited numerous books on post-communist mafia states since 2013. He was an Open Society Fellow for carrying out comparative studies in this field (2015–2016), Hans Speier Visiting Professor at the New School (2017), and a Senior Fellow at the CEU Institute for Advanced Study (2018–2019). Formerly, he was an activist of the Hungarian anti-communist dissident movement, founder of the Liberal Party of Hungary (SZDSZ, 1988), a member of the Hungarian Parliament (1990–2010), and the Hungarian minister of education (1996–1998, 2002–2006).

Political offices
Preceded by Gábor Fodor	Minister of Education; 1996–1998	Succeeded by Zoltán Pokorni
Preceded by József Pálinkás	Minister of Education; 2002–2006	Succeeded by István Hiller
Party political offices
Preceded by Gábor Kuncze	President of the Alliance of Free Democrats; 1998–2000	Succeeded by Gábor Demszky
