= András Bozóki =

Hungarian sociologist and politician

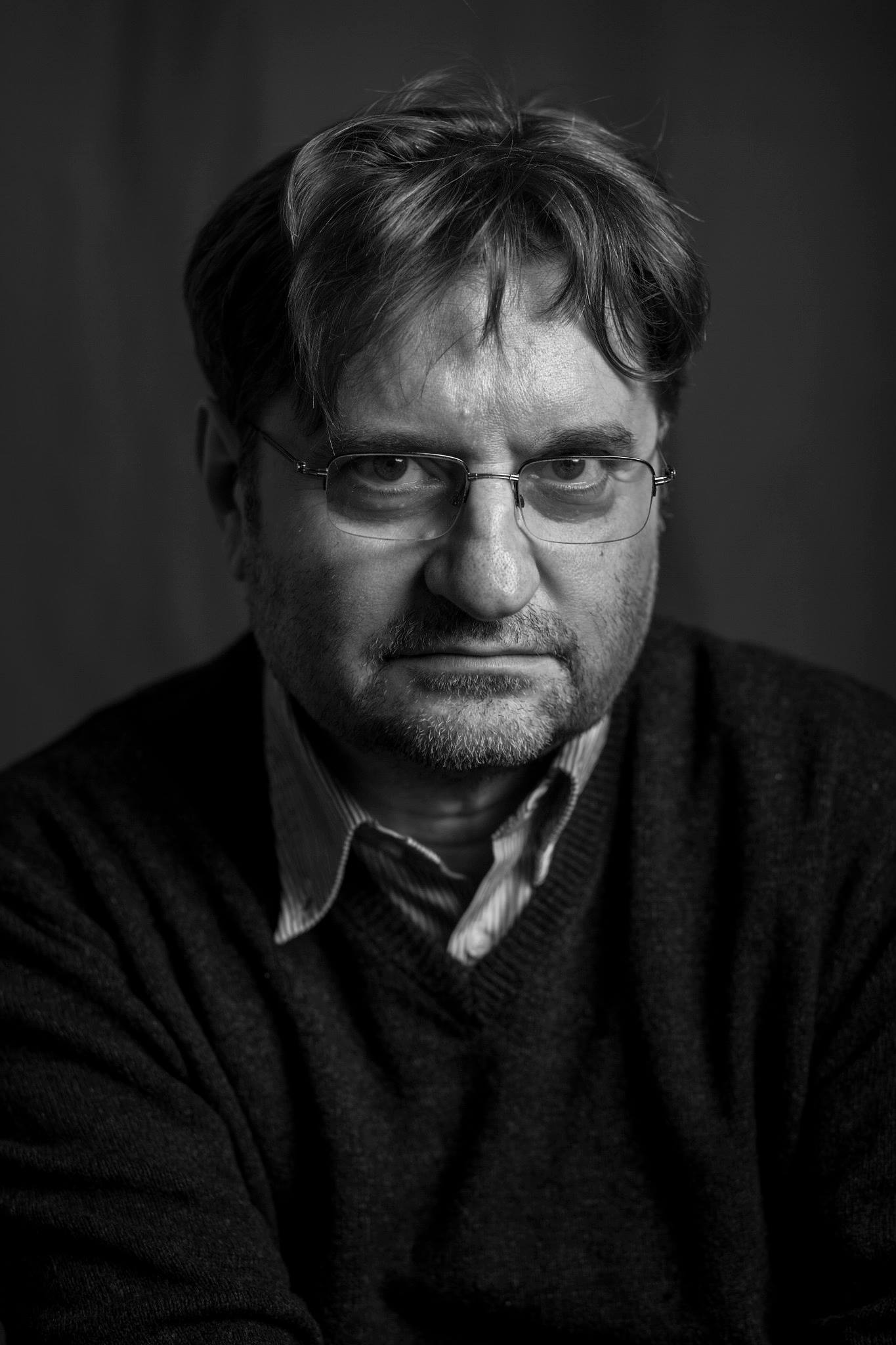

Minister of National Cultural Heritage
- In office 14 February 2005 – 9 June 2006
- Preceded by: István Hiller
- Succeeded by: István Hiller (Minister of Education and Culture)

Personal details
- Born: 23 January 1959 (age 66); Budapest, Hungary
- Political party: Independent
- Profession: political scientist, sociologist, politician

András Bozóki (born 23 January 1959) is a Hungarian sociologist and politician. He served as Minister of Culture between 2005 and 2006. He is professor of political science at Central European University.

His research areas are political change, political systems, Central European politics, political ideologies, the history of ideas and the political role of the intelligentsia.

== Life ==
He studied at Eötvös Loránd University and obtained a Doctor Juris in law in 1983 and a Master of Arts in sociology in 1985. After graduation, he got a teaching position at the university, where he taught at the Department of Sociology and Law (since 2013 named as Department of Legal and Social Theory). In 1988–1989, he was a fellow at UCLA's Department of Sociology.

In 1985, he participated in the opposition event of the European Cultural Forum. In 1987 he was at the anti-communist Lakitelek meeting, where the opposition Hungarian Democratic Forum (MDF) was established. In May 1988 he was the founder of the Free Initiatives Network, a predecessor organization of the Alliance of Free Democrats (SZDSZ). Between 1988 and 1993 he was a member of Fidesz. In 1989, he participated in the National Round Table negotiations, where he represented Fidesz and was a member of the working committee dealing with the creation of legal guarantees excluding violent solutions. From January to May 1990, he was the spokesperson of Fidesz. In 1991–1992 he was an expert of the party's parliamentary faction. Between 1989 and 1992 he worked as the founding editor of newspaper Magyar Narancs. In 1993 he left Fidesz.

In 1992, he defended his doctoral dissertation in political science at the Hungarian Academy of Sciences. Since 1993, he has been a full-time lecturer at the Central European University, participating in the development of the doctoral program in political science.

In the 2000s, he was a columnist for Magyar Hírlap and then Figyelő. Between 2003 and 2004, he was a member of the advisory board of Prime Minister Péter Medgyessy. From February 2005 to June 2006, he was Minister of Culture in the first Ferenc Gyurcsány government.

He was a visiting professor (Deák Chair) at Columbia University (2004, 2009, 2015), University of Nottingham (1993), Smith College, Mount Holyoke College, Hampshire College (1999–2000), University of Tübingen (1999–2001), University of Bologna (2008) and University of Ljubljana (2013). He was a researcher at the Institut für die Wissenschaften von Menschen (IWM) in Vienna (1990–1991 and 2018), the Wisschenschaftskolleg in Berlin (Andrew Mellon Fellow, 1993–1994), the European Institute of Sussex University (1998), the Netherlands Institute for Advanced Study (NIAS) (1998), the European University Institute (EUI) (Jean Monnet Fellow, 2000–2001 and Fernand Braudel Fellow, 2012), and Södertörn University in Stockholm (2008).

== Works ==
- Post-Communist Transition: Emerging Pluralism in Hungary London: Pinter, New York: St. Martin's Press (társszerző és társszerk.) 1992. Bloomsbury Academic, 2016
- Democratic Legitimacy in Post-Communist Societies. Budapest – Tübingen: T-Twins, (szerk.), 1994
- Lawful Revolution in Hungary. Boulder, Colorado: Social Science Monographs, (társszerk.), 1995
- Intellectuals and Politics in Central Europe. Budapest – New York: CEU Press, (szerk.), 1999
- The Roundtable Talks of 1989: The Genesis of Hungarian Democracy. Budapest – New York: CEU Press (szerk.), 2002
- The Communist Successor Parties of Central and Eastern Europe. New York – London: M. E. Sharpe, (társszerk.), 2002, Re-published by Routledge
- The Future of Democracy in Europe: Trends, Analyses and Reforms. Luxembourg: Council of Europe, (társszerző), 2004
- Migrants, Minorities, Belonging and Citizenship. Bergen. BRIC, (társszerző), 2004
- Anarchism in Hungary: Theory, History, Legacies. Boulder, Colorado: Social Science Monographs, (társszerző), 2006
- Diversity and the European Public Sphere: The Case of Hungary. Bergen: BRIC (társszerző), 2010
- 25 Years after the Fall of Iron Curtain: The State of Integration of East and West in the European Union. Brussels: European Commission, (társszerző), 2014
- Rolling Transition and the Role of Intellectuals: The Case of Hungary. Budapest - New York: CEU Press, 2022
- Töréspontok: Tanulmányok az autokrácia kialakulásáról. Budapest: Gondolat, 2024
- Embedded Autocracy: Hungary in the European Union. (co-author) Lanham - London - New York: Lexington Books, 2024

Political offices
Preceded by István Hiller	Minister of National Cultural Heritage; 2005–2006	Succeeded by István Hiller
