= István Hiller =

Hungarian politician

István Hiller MP
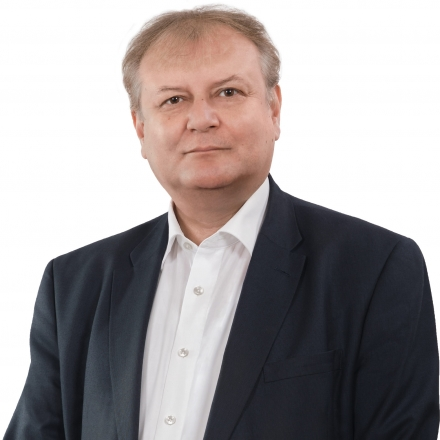

Minister of Education and Culture
- In office 9 June 2006 – 29 May 2010
- Prime Minister: Ferenc Gyurcsány
- Preceded by: Bálint Magyar (Minister of Education); András Bozóki (Minister of Culture)
- Succeeded by: Miklós Réthelyi (Minister of National Resources)

Minister of National Cultural Heritage
- In office 19 May 2003 – 13 February 2005
- Preceded by: Gábor Görgey
- Succeeded by: András Bozóki

Personal details
- Born: 7 May 1964 (age 61) Sopron, Hungary
- Party: MSZMP (1983–1989); MSZP (1989–present)
- Spouse: Julianna Farkas (m. 1988)
- Children: 2
- Profession: Historian, politician

István Hiller (born 7 May 1964) is a Hungarian politician and former chairman of the ruling Hungarian Socialist Party between 16 October 2004 and 24 February 2007, succeeding László Kovács, succeeded by Ferenc Gyurcsány. A co-founder of his party, Hiller was Minister of National Cultural Heritage under the government of Ferenc Gyurcsány from 2003 to 2005 before being replaced by András Bozóki. He became Vice Chairman of the party in 2003. Hiller was the Minister of Education and Culture between 2006 and 2010. He was elected one of the deputy speakers of the National Assembly in May 2014. In 2016, Hiller was elected caucus chair of MSZP.

== Education ==
He earned a degree in history and latin from the Faculty of Humanities of the Eötvös Loránd University. Hiller attended university in Budapest and Heidelberg, and carried out research at the University of Vienna in 1995 and 1997. He speaks German, Latin and Ancient Greek fluently, as well as Italian and English.

== Personal life ==
Hiller is married and has two sons, Gábor (b. 1990) and Dávid (b. 1992). His wife is Julianna Farkas.

Political offices
Preceded by Gábor Görgey	Minister of Culture; 2003–2005	Succeeded by András Bozóki
Preceded by Bálint Magyar; Education	Minister of Education and Culture; 2006–2010	Succeeded by Miklós Réthelyi; National Resources
Preceded by András Bozóki; Culture	Minister of Education and Culture; 2006–2010	Succeeded by Miklós Réthelyi; National Resources
Party political offices
Preceded by László Kovács	Chairman of the Hungarian Socialist Party; 2004–2007	Succeeded by Ferenc Gyurcsány
