= Hungarian Two-Tailed Dog Party =

Political party in Hungary

Hungarian Two-Tailed Dog Party Magyar Kétfarkú Kutya Párt
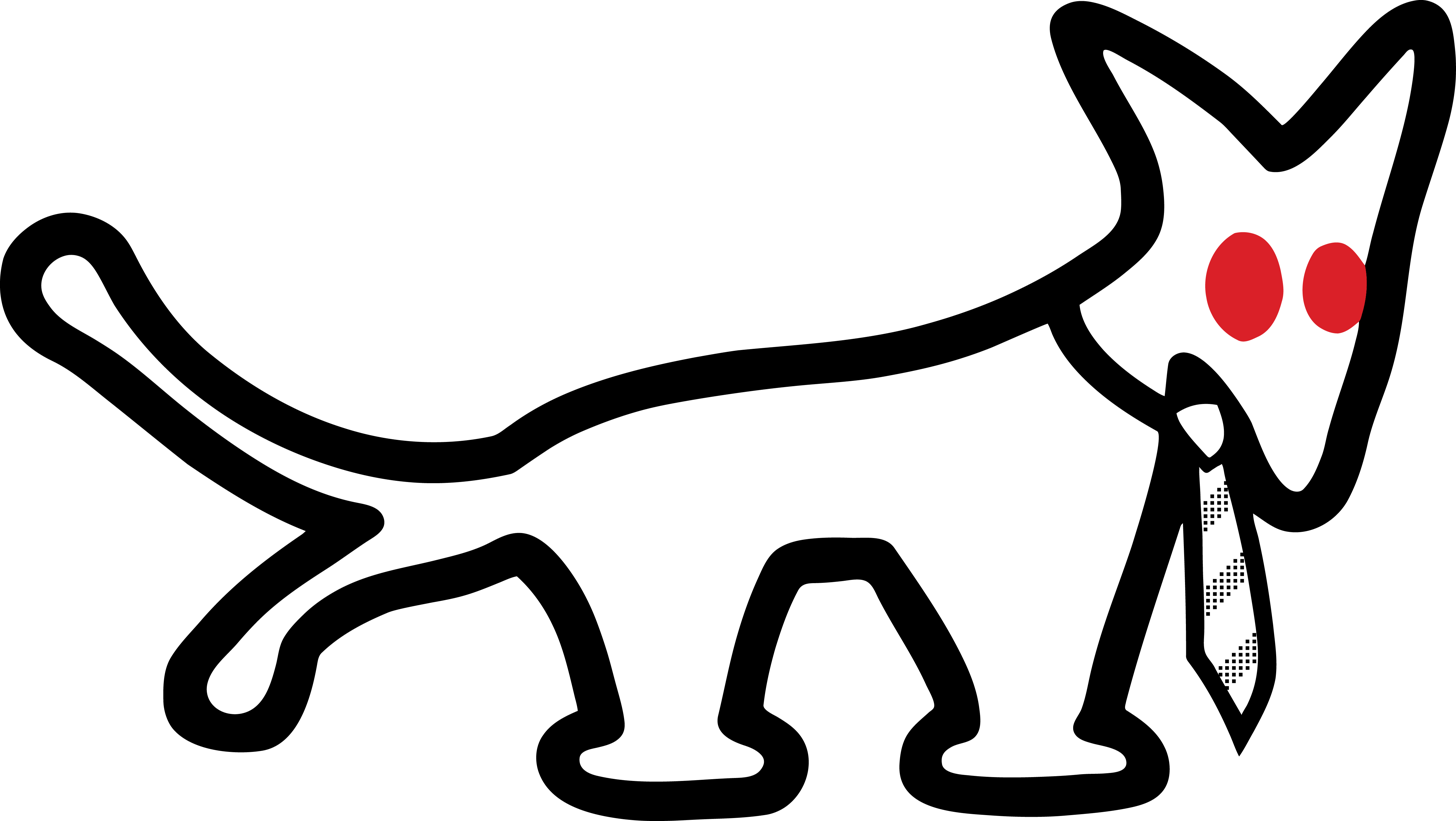
- Abbreviation: MKKP
- President: Csanád Tóth-Benedek
- Vice presidents: Zoltán Várady; Sándor Budai
- Founded: January 2006
- Registered: 8 September 2014
- Headquarters: 1076 Budapest, Garay tér 10.
- Ideology: Political satire Anti-establishment
- Colours: Grey
- Slogan: Az egyetlen értelmes választás ('The only sensible choice')
- National Assembly: 0 / 199
- European Parliament: 0 / 21
- County Assemblies: 2 / 381
- General Assembly of Budapest: 3 / 33

Website
- mkkp.hu

The Hungarian Two-Tailed Dog Party (Hungarian: Magyar Kétfarkú Kutya Párt [ˈmɒɟɒr ˈkeːtfɒrkuː ˈkucɒ ˈpaːrt], MKKP [ˈɛmkaːkaːpeː]) is a satirical political party in Hungary. It was founded in Szeged in 2006, but did not register as an official political party until 2014.

== Political activity ==
=== 2006–2010 elections ===
All of the electoral candidates were called Nagy István (literally "Stephen Grand", the Hungarian equivalent of generic names such as the English John Smith) during the 2006 national and local elections.

An example of Two-tailed Dog Party fake political posters: this poster is captioned "For a smaller Hungary!", in reference to Hungarian irredentists' demands for the revocation of the Treaty of Trianon; the "proposed" borders of Hungary are shaped like those of the pre-war Kingdom of Hungary, albeit (nonsensically) reduced to fit within Hungary's current frontiers.

The Two-Tailed Dog Party was not a registered political party until 2014, though it participated in the 2006 elections. The party platform promised eternal life, world peace, a one-day workweek, two sunsets a day (in assorted colours), lower gravity, free beer, and low taxes. Other electoral pledges have included building a mountain on the Great Hungarian Plain. Party election posters were mostly in Szeged and featuring the candidate István Nagy, who is a two-tailed dog, with slogans such as "He's so cute, surely he isn't going to steal".

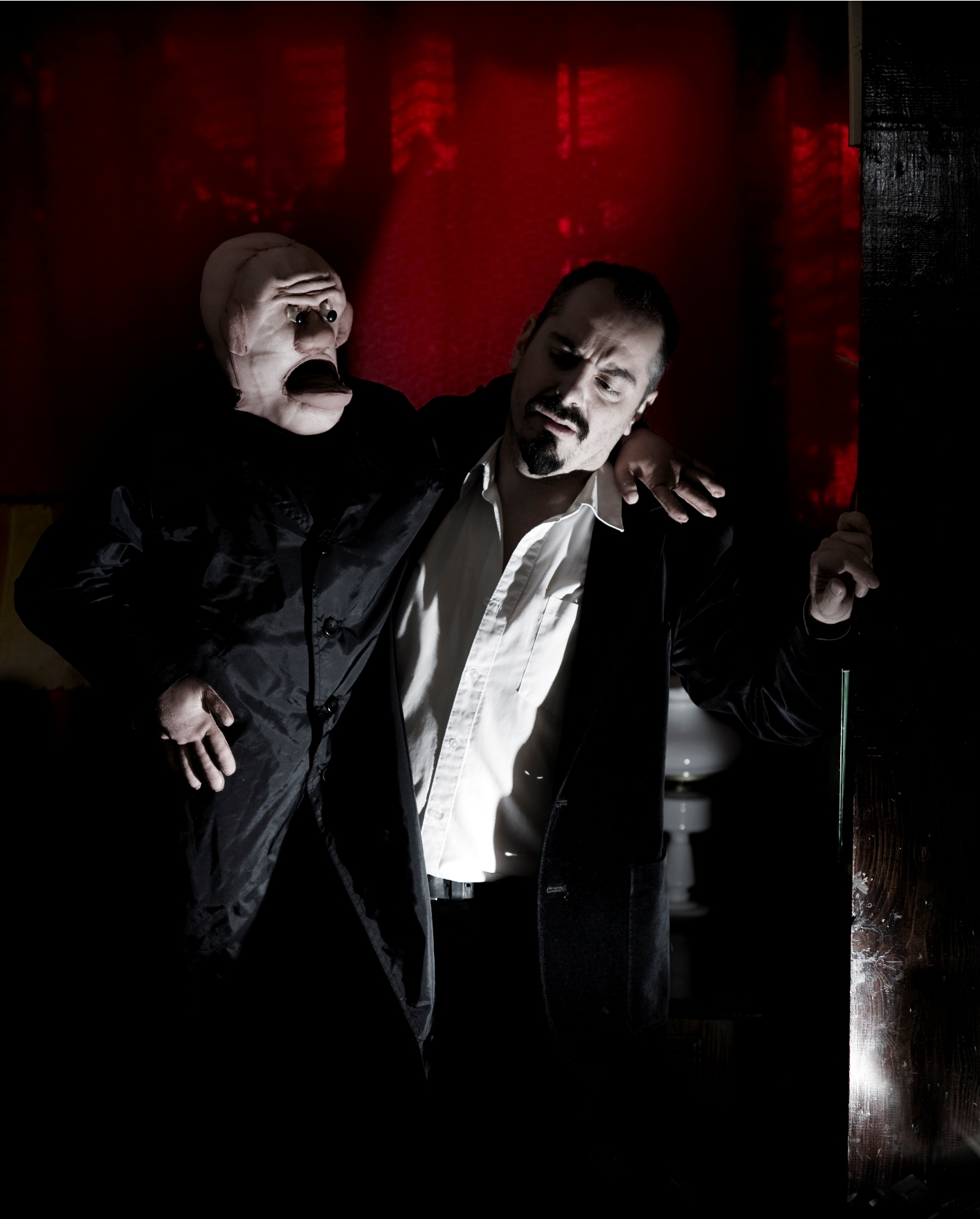
Dániel Mogács in 2008

The party is on good terms with another joke party, the Fourth Way, which is led by two birds. However, there are some disagreements between them, since Fourth Way plans to abolish bird flu, which is opposed by the Two-tailed Dog Party on the principle of viral rights. On 20 June 2009, the MKKP held a "general" protest with approximately three hundred participants in front of the Hungarian Central Statistical Office (KSH) to demand "Tomorrow should be yesterday!", "Look stupid!" and "Disband!" etc., with a chant of "What do we want? Nothing! When do we want it? Never!".

In 2010, the party announced their candidacy for mayor of Budapest with the main slogan "Let everything be better!". Campaign slogans include "More everything, less nothing!", "Eternal life, free beer, tax-deduction!" and "We promise anything!". In Erzsébetváros (District VII, Budapest), the mayoral candidate of the party was notable stand-up comedian Dániel Mogács, who has carried out a number of awareness-generating actions during the campaign period, including a surreal interview with television host Olga Kálmán (ATV's Straight Talk). However, neither candidate was able to collect the appropriate number of recommendation slips to participate in the election. According to its detailed economic program, MKKP intended to develop Szeged space station into an interplanetary spaceport, which would be used for Pulis' export to Jamaica. The program also contained environmental elements, such as patching the ozone hole and the creation of new species to replace extinct ones. The party also proposed establishing trade relations with extraterrestrial life forms, and opening a Hungarian restaurant on Mars to improve the country's image.

=== 2014–2018 elections ===
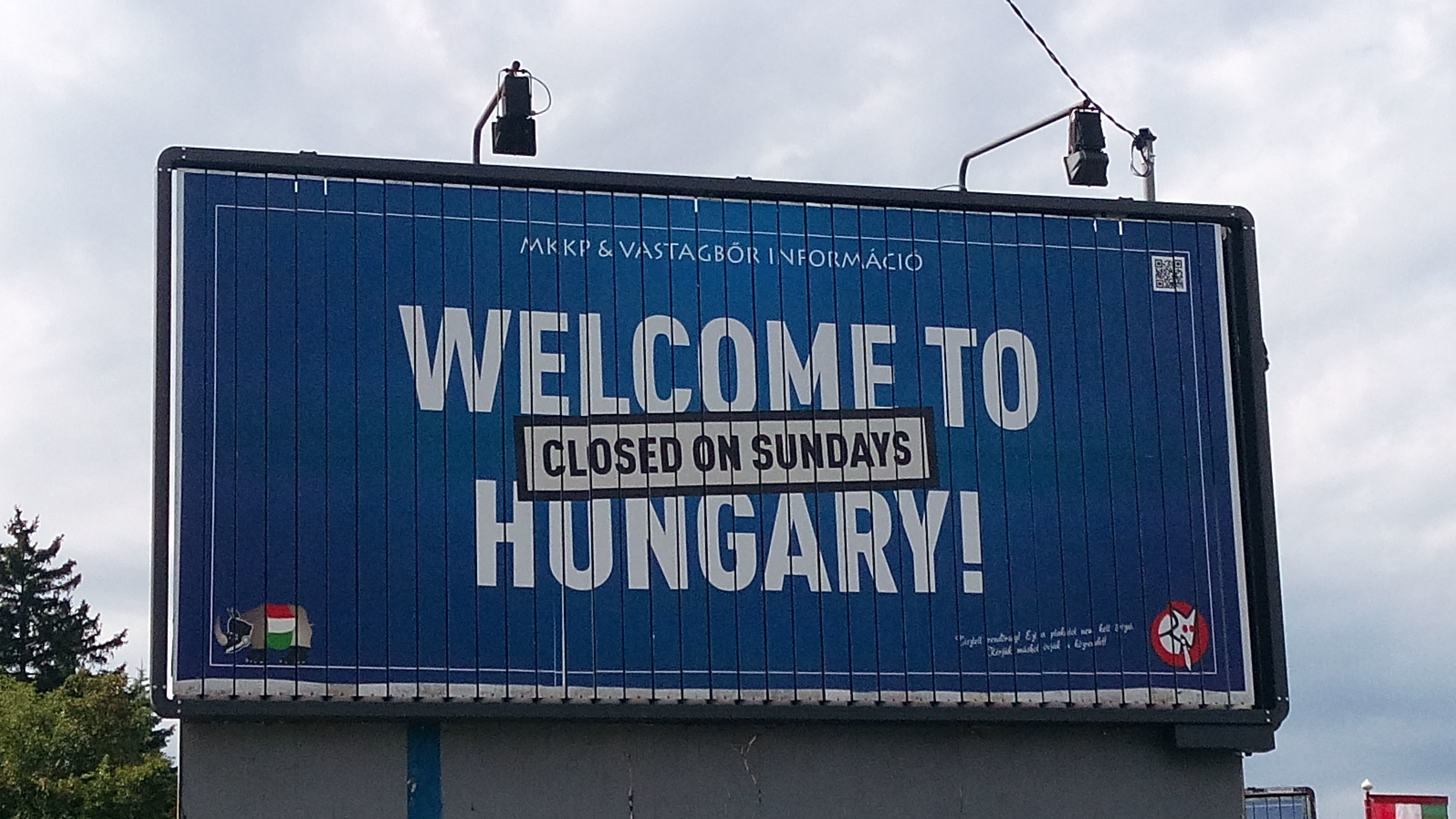
MKKP and Vastagbőr's billboard in 2015 during the migrant crisis, which also regard the government's stance on Sunday trading clampdown laws as retrograde

The party spent most of 2013 trying to finish the official registration process, which new election law made compulsory, so it could start its campaign. The registration was rejected in early 2014 on the grounds of the party's "flippancy". In July 2014, the Supreme Court ruled that this was not a valid reason to reject the party, and the registration process should continue. The MKKP was officially registered on 8 September 2014, only 16 minutes before the deadline for nomination of candidates for the 2014 local elections, so the party was unable to participate in the election.

In June 2015, the ruling Third Orbán Government launched an anti-immigrant poster campaign during the intensifying European migrant crisis, with slogans such as "If you come to Hungary, you cannot take the Hungarians' jobs away!". In response, the Two-Tailed Dog Party and the Vastagbőr blog ("Thick Skin") jointly called for an "anti-anti-immigration campaign", and collected more than 33 million HUF (ten times the expected amount) from supporters to set up around 800 billboards parodying those of the government, with slogans in Hungarian and English such as "Sorry about our Prime Minister" and "Feel free to come to Hungary, we already work in England!".

On 4 February 2016, Medián's poll for the first time registered support for the Hungarian Two-Tailed Dog Party, which suggested they would get 1% of the vote.

The Hungarian Two-Tailed Dog Party was closely involved in the campaign during the October 2016 migrant quota referendum, mocking the government's anti-immigrant messages and phrases. In response to government posters which read "Did you know?" followed by claimed facts about immigration, the party spent €100,000 of voluntary donations from 4,000 people on posters with satirical slogans, such as "Did you know there's a war in Syria?", "Did you know one million Hungarians want to emigrate to Europe?", "Did you know? The perpetrators in most corruption cases are politicians" and "Did you know? During the Olympics, the biggest danger to Hungarian participants came from foreign competitors". Party leader Gergely Kovács told BBC News that "... What we can do is appeal to the millions in Hungary who are upset by the government campaign. We want them to know they are not alone". The party asked people to cast invalid ballots in the referendum. Eventually, 6% of the voters cast a spoiled ballot.

Shortly before the referendum, the party made a mobile app available for download on its website. The app, called "Vote Invalidly", could be used to take a photo of the spoilt votes and publish it. MKKP received a fine of 832,000 Hungarian forints for releasing the app, because publishing a ballot paper is illegal (even though the app published them anonymously). The fine was later reduced to 100,000 Hungarian forints by the decision of the Curia, based on the argument that publishing ballot papers anonymously did not violate the secrecy of the voting, although it was a misuse of the ballot papers.

=== 2018–2022 elections ===
The party officially took part in the 2018 parliamentary elections and got 1.73% of the total vote, but no seats. Because the party participated in the election, it became eligible to receive government funds, which it spends on the "Rózsa Sándor State Fund Wasting Public Program".

The party participated in the 2019 European Parliament election. Despite an increase to 2.62% of the votes, it did not win a seat. Its campaign promises included building an overpass above the country for refugees, opening six Nemzeti Dohánybolt stores outside Hungary, introducing mandatory siesta and banning the Eurovision Song Contest.

In the 2019 local elections the party ran in four districts of Budapest (II., XII., XIV., XV.) where they had elected one council member each. They also formally or informally supported a handful of mayoral candidates, most notably in Ferencváros and Szombathely. After the election, newly elected Ferencváros mayor Krisztina Baranyi appointed co-leader Zsuzsanna Döme as one of her deputy mayors.

=== 2022–2026 elections ===
The party officially took part in the 2022 parliamentary elections and increased their vote share to 3.27% of the total vote, making them the fourth largest political block, but gained no seats because of the 5% threshold.

The party participated in the 2024 European parliament election and the simultaneously held 2024 local elections. In District 12 of Budapest, party co-leader Gergely Kovács won 61% of the first preference votes in a ranked-choice opposition primary, the first the party has joined. Other main opposition parties are now expected not to field a candidate for mayor and half of the district seats for councilors are to be nominated exclusively by the Two-Tailed Dog Party, plus 2 seats. Kovács won the mayorship with 54% of the votes, and the party won 10 out of the 18 seats in the district council.

In April 2025, the party held its largest demonstration to date, marching under the banner of 'illiberal pride' to protest changes the government made to the right to assembly.

=== 2026 election ===
Ahead of the 2026 Hungarian parliamentary election, MKKP confirmed that it would be running independently, after it had considered allying with Péter Magyar's Tisza. The MKKP's list in 2026 is led by the party's director, Dávid Nagy. The following four candidates, who are to take leadership positions, include several local politicians. The two leaders of the party are not going to run for national election.

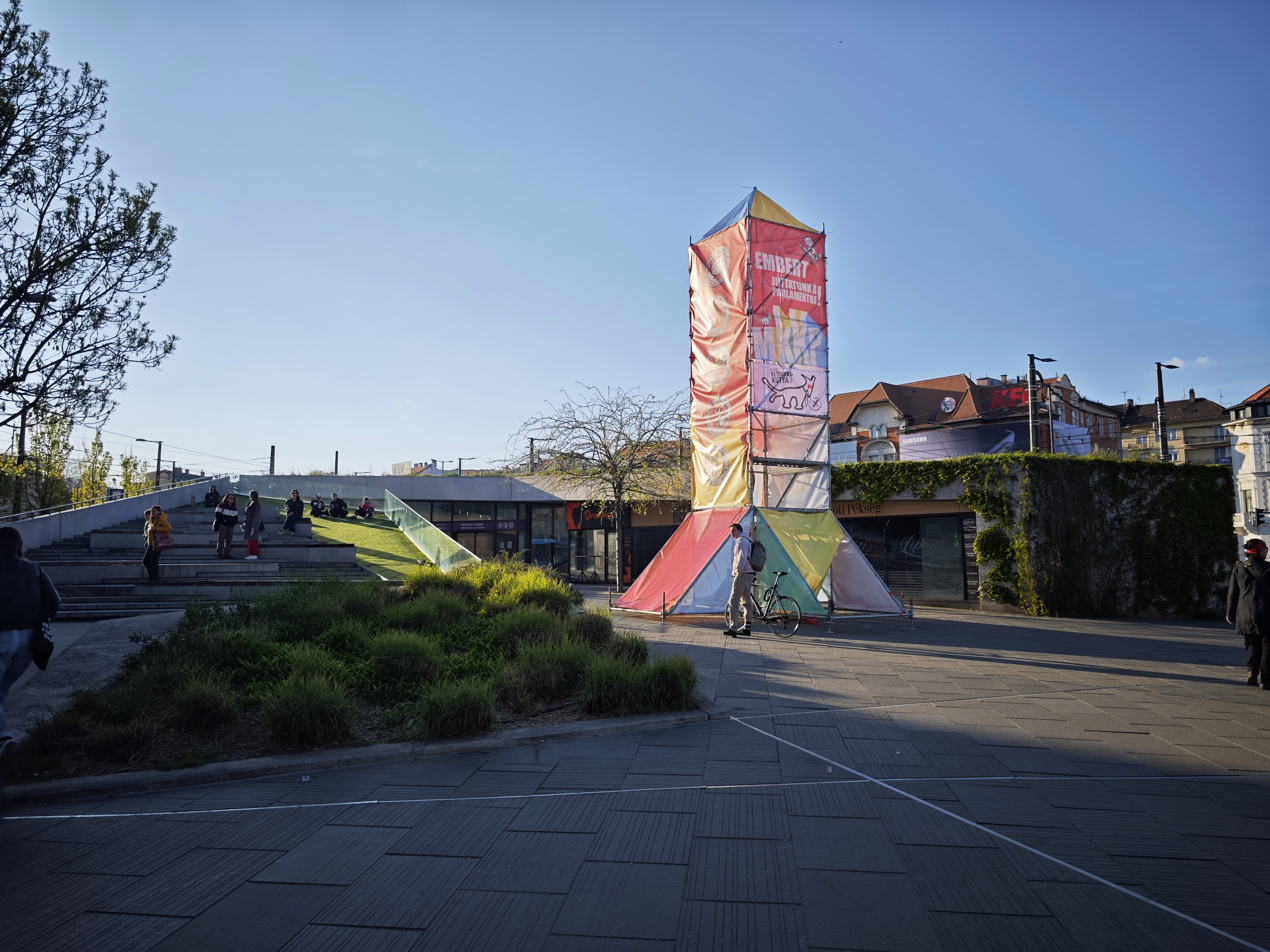
Party's electoral poster in Budapest during 2026 Hungarian parliamentary election

On 6 April 2026 an online documentary entitled "Az ebek ura" (lit. 'Lord of the Dogs') was released by journalist Vera Mérő; the documentary alleges embezzlement of funds, corruption and internal purges of dissenting opinion. The party leadership has denied the accusations and described the documentary as character assassination.

In the election, the party ended up with only 0.82% of the vote, failing to secure a candidate seat; chairman Dávid Nagy announced his resignation immediately. Due to not having reached 1% of the votes, the party has to pay back its 686 million forints (around $2.2M) worth of campaign funding it received from the government. As they have spent the funding, they are attempting to cover it through donations.

== Street art and protest ==
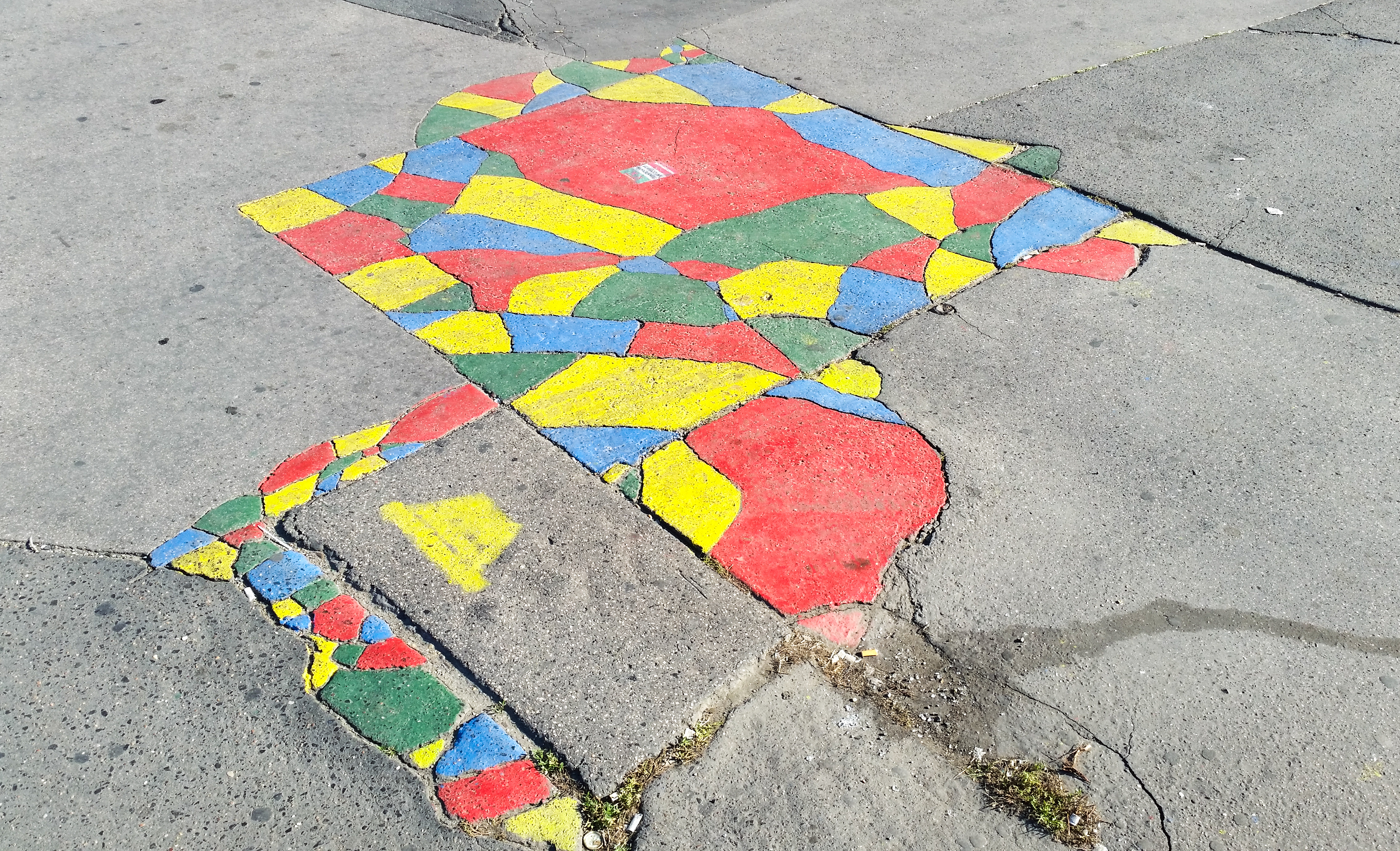
Street art illustrating the four color theorem in Budapest

Especially starting off, the party utilised street art and protest campaigns to get its message across. This targeted various companies and public bodies, often highlighting poor infrastructure. For example, in 2009, party leader Gergely Kovács created a parody of the website Pecs2010.hu (the official site of Pécs as Cultural Capital of Europe in 2010), for which he was threatened with legal action, but the owners of the original site backed down after the case got publicity. Local parties also undertake city beautification actions, such as renovating street benches.

Increasingly during the latter half of the 2010s, the party began to run more campaigns and art stunts opposing the authoritarian and anti-immigration policies of the government led by Viktor Orbán.

== Election results ==
=== National Assembly ===
Election	Leader	Constituency		Party list		Seats	+/–	Status
Election	Leader	Votes	%	Votes	%	Seats	+/–	Status
2018	Gergely Kovács	39,763	0.72 (#8)	99,414	1.73 (#7)	0 / 199	New	Extra-parliamentary
2022	Gergely Kovács	126,648	2.36 (#4)	185,052	3.27 (#4)	0 / 199	0	Extra-parliamentary
2026	Gergely Kovács	38,924	0.65 (#5)	51,965	0.82 (#5)	0 / 199	0	Extra-parliamentary

=== European Parliament ===
Election	List leader	Votes	%	Seats	+/−	EP Group
2019	Zsuzsanna Döme	90,912	2.62 (#7)	0 / 21	New	—
2024	Marietta Le	163,960	3.59 (#6)	0 / 21	0	—

== Party organisation ==
The MKKP is structured in a three-tier system: a national organisation, six national coordinators, and over 100 local organisations. Local authorities have relative autonomy.

Anyone can join in with the activities of the party informally. Party membership is granted to actively participating activists, and acts as the most important decision-making body. For example, members elect the leadership and decide election candidates.

== See also ==
- Novelty candidate
- List of frivolous political parties
