= Gábor Görgey =

Hungarian politician (1929–2022)

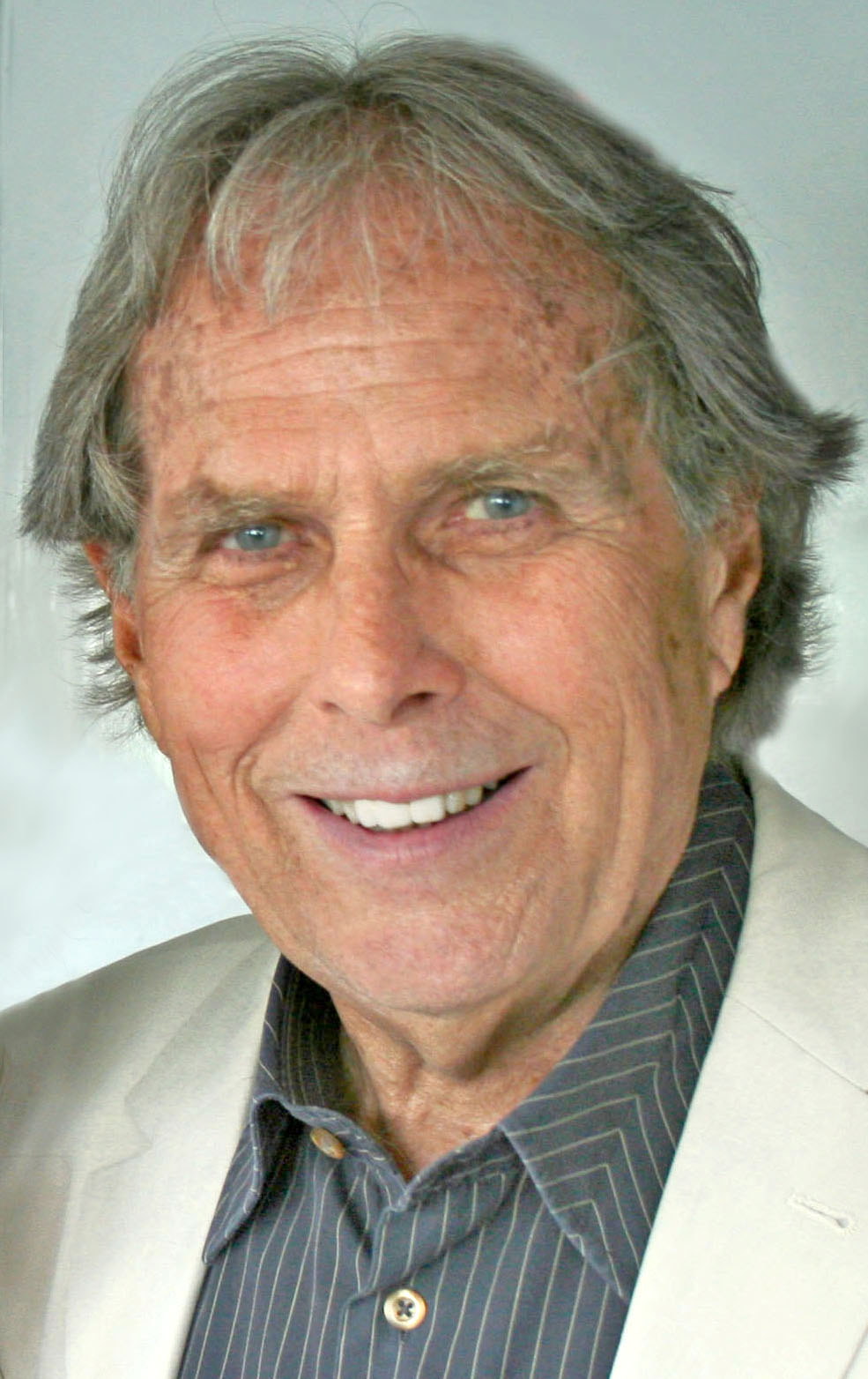
- At the 2007 Hungarian Kossuth Prize

Minister of Culture of Hungary
- In office 27 May 2002 – 18 May 2003
- Preceded by: Zoltán Rockenbauer
- Succeeded by: István Hiller

Personal details
- Born: 22 November 1929; Budapest, Hungary
- Died: 11 April 2022 (aged 92); Solymár, Hungary
- Political party: Independent
- Spouse: Ildikó Iván
- Children: 3
- Profession: novelist, director, poet, politician

Gábor Görgey (born Artúr Görgey; 22 November 1929 – 11 April 2022) was a Hungarian writer, poet, director and politician, who served as Minister of Culture between 2002 and 2003. He was a descendant of the freedom fighter General Artúr Görgey who served as Minister of War during the Hungarian Revolution of 1848. He died on 11 April 2022, at the age of 92.

== Honours ==
- Graves Prize (1976)
- Attila József Prize (1980)
- Tibor Déry Award (1989)
- Book of the Year Award (2000)
- Pro urbe Budapest (2001)
- Gold Pen (2005)
- Kossuth Prize (2006)

== Works ==
- Füst és fény (poems, 1956)
- Délkör (poems, 1963)
- Köszönöm, jól (poems, 1970)
- Alacsony az Ararát (plays, 1971)
- Légifolyosó (poems, 1977)
- Munkavilágítás (essays, 1984)
- A díva bosszúja (short stories, 1988)
- Nők szigete (poems, 1990)
- Mindig újabb kutyák jönnek (novel, 1991)
- Eszkimó nyár (poems, 1993)
- Utolsó jelentés Atlantiszról (novel, 2000)
- Volt egyszer egy Felvidék! (novel, 1989) Magvető Kiadó, Budapest, 1989.

His first drama, the Komámasszony, hol a stukker? brought significant successes. It was shown in the United States too.

Political offices
| Preceded by Zoltán Rockenbauer | Minister of Culture; 2002–2003 | Succeeded by István Hiller |
