= József Pálinkás =

Hungarian atomic physicist and politician

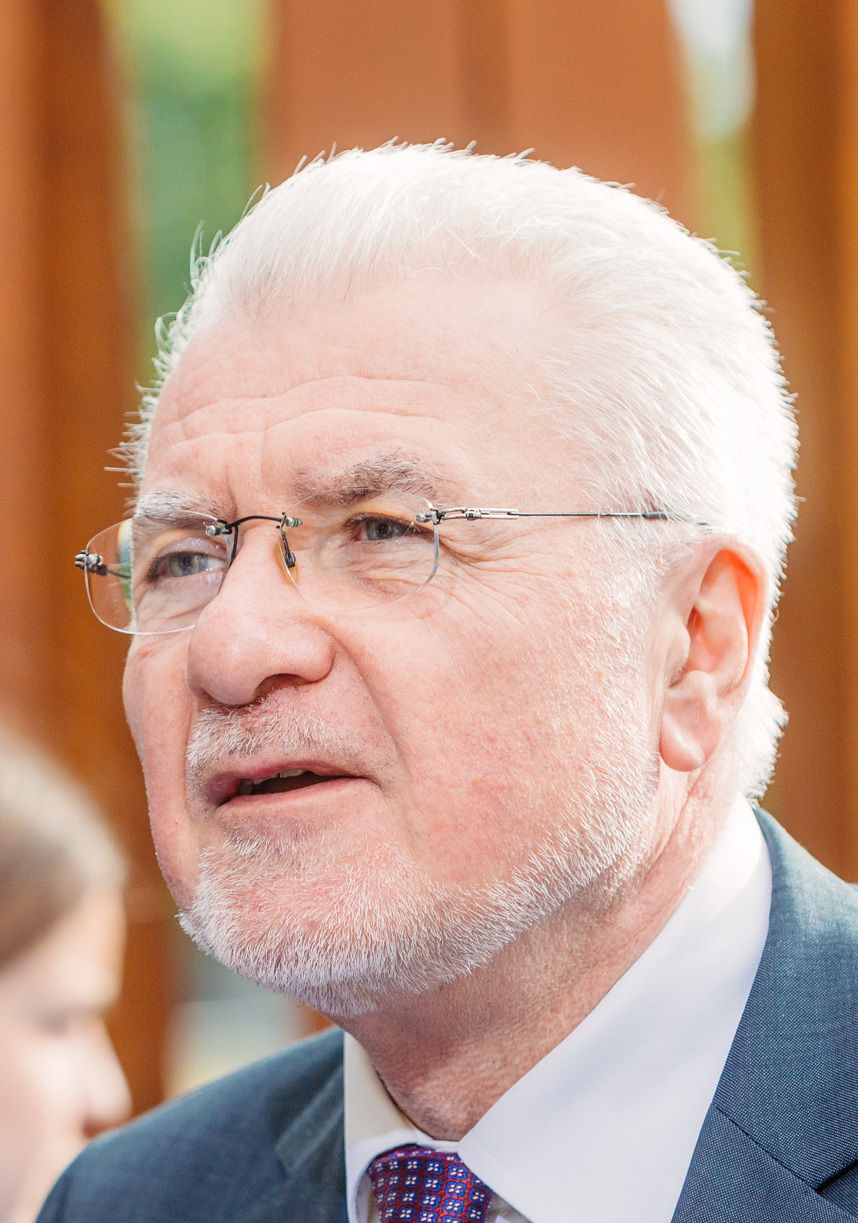
- Pálinkás in 2017

Minister of Education of Hungary
- In office 16 July 2001 – 27 May 2002
- Preceded by: Zoltán Pokorni
- Succeeded by: Bálint Magyar

Personal details
- Born: 18 September 1952 (age 73) Galvács, Hungary
- Party: MDF (1991–1996); MDNP (1996–1998); Fidesz (1999–2008); ÚVNP (2020–2022)
- Children: 3
- Profession: Atomic physicist, politician

József Pálinkás (born 18 September 1952) is a Hungarian atomic physicist and politician who served as Minister of Education between 2001 and 2002. He was President of the Hungarian Academy of Sciences from 2008 to 2014.

== Education and career ==
Pálinkás studied physics at the Attila József University in Szeged and graduated in 1977. In 1981, he received his PhD from Lajos Kossuth University of the Sciences in Debrecen.

He was the director of the ATOMKI from 1991 to 1996. In 1995, he became a full professor and head of the Department of Physics at the Lajos Kossuth University of Debrecen. In 2005, he became Director of the Physics Institute at the University of Debrecen. From 2007 to 2008, he was President of the Centre of Arts, Humanities and Sciences.

He was a visiting scientist at the Manne Siegbahn Institute in Stockholm, a postdoctoral fellow at the Cyclotron Institute in Texas and a PhD student at the Institute for Nuclear Physics of the Hungarian Academy of Sciences.

From 1998 to 2001, he served as Secretary of State of Education and from 2001 to 2002, he served as Minister of Education.

Thereafter Pálinkás served as Government Commissioner responsible for the creation of the National Research, Development and Innovation Office (NKFIH) from 12 June to 31 December 2014. Following that he was President of the National Research, Development and Innovation Office between 1 January 2015 and 30 June 2018.

== Memberships ==
From 2008 to 2014, Pálinkás was President of the Hungarian Academy of Sciences and the World Science Forum.

He is a member of the European Academy of Sciences and Arts.

== Publications ==
- Experimental Investigation of the Angular Distribution of Characteristic X-Radiation Following Electron Impact Ionisation (co-author, 1979)
- L3-Subshell Alignment in Gold Following Low-Velocity Proton and He+ Impact Ionisation (co-author, 1980)
- L3-Subshell Alignment of Gold by C+ and N+ Impact Ionisation (co-author, 1982)
- Alignment of He- and H-Like P-States of 48-MeV Foil-Excited Mg Ions (co-author, 1985)
- Observation of the Electron Capture into the Continuum States of Neutral Projectiles (co-author, 1989)
- Egzotikus elektronbefogási folyamatok (1996)
- Status of CMS and B-physics with CMS (co-author, 2000)
- The CMS Experiment at the CERN LHC (co-author, 2008)

Political offices
| Preceded by Zoltán Pokorni | Minister of Education; 2001–2002 | Succeeded by Bálint Magyar |
Cultural offices
| Preceded by Szilveszter Vizi | President of the Hungarian Academy of Sciences; 2008–2014 | Succeeded by László Lovász |
