= Hegyvidék =

12th District of Budapest Budapest XII. kerülete Hegyvidék
- District of Budapest
- District XII
- Flag Coat of arms

- Location of District XII in Budapest (shown in grey)
- Coordinates: 47.5°N 19°E
- Country: Hungary
- Region: Central Hungary
- City: Budapest
- Established: 1 July 1940
- Quarters: List: Budakeszierdő; Csillebérc; Farkasrét; Farkasvölgy; Istenhegy; János Hill; Kissvábhegy; Krisztinaváros; Kútvölgy; Magasút; Mártonhegy; Németvölgy; Orbánhegy; Sashegy; Svábhegy; Széchenyihegy; Virányos; Zugliget

Government
  - Mayor: Gergely Kovács (MKKP)

Area
  - Total: 26.67 km^{2} (10.30 sq mi)
  - Rank: 11th

Population (2016)
  - Total: 58,171
  - Rank: 17th
  - Density: 2,181/km^{2} (5,649/sq mi)
- Demonym: tizenkettedik kerületi ("12th districter")
- Time zone: UTC+1 (CET)
  - Summer (DST): UTC+2 (CEST)
- Postal code: 1121 ... 1126
- Website: www.hegyvidek.hu

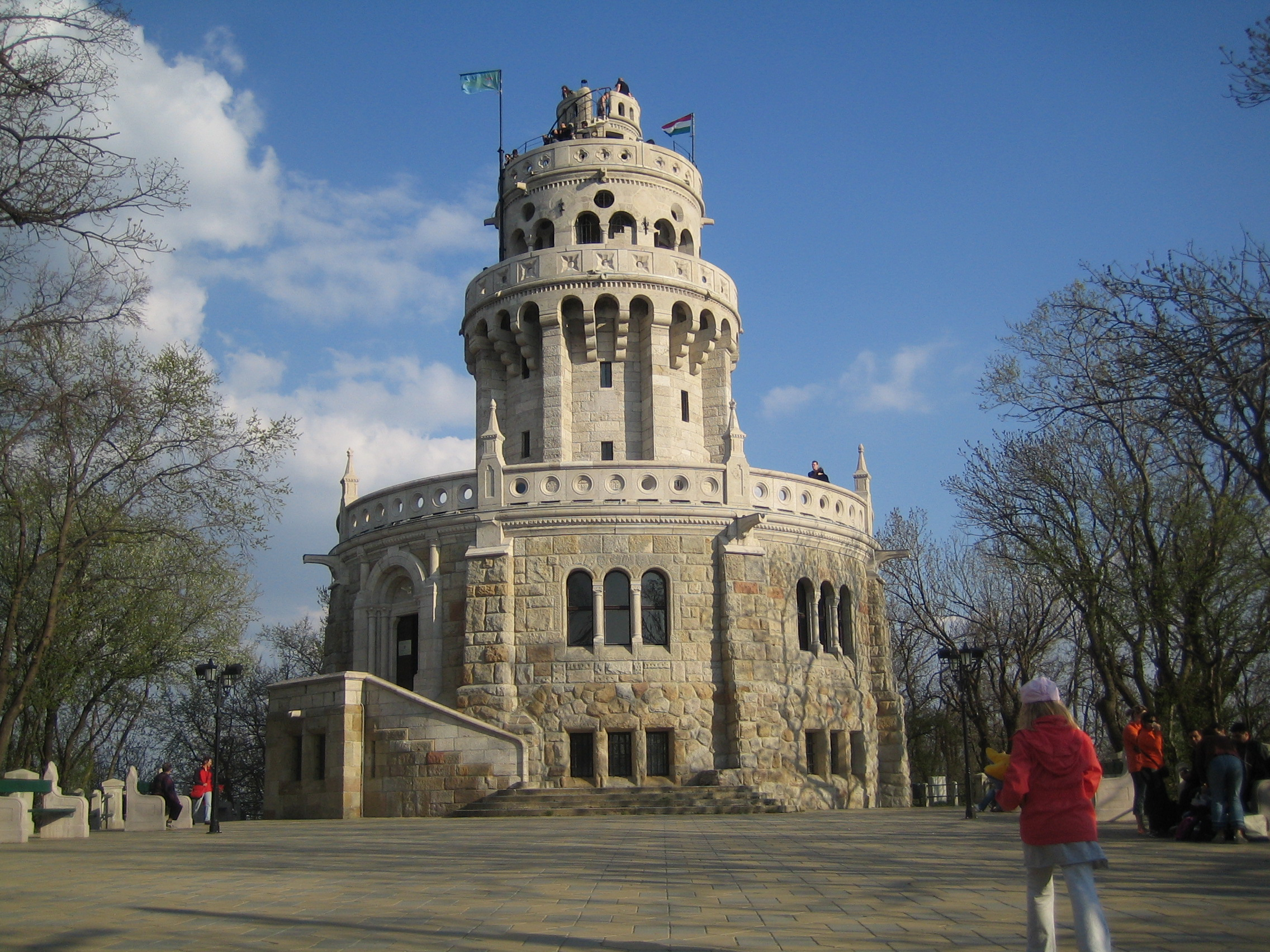
Elizabeth Lookout at János Hill

Hegyvidék (Hungarian pronunciation: [ˈhɛɟvideːk], official name: Budapest XII. kerülete, Hungarian pronunciation: [ˈbudɒpɛʃt ˈkɛtøːdik kɛryletɛ]) (German: Bergland, literally "Highlands", or "Mountain-land") is the official name of the XII district of Budapest (Hungarian: Budapest XII. kerülete), capital of Hungary. It is a region of Buda, on the west bank of river Danube.

== Geography ==
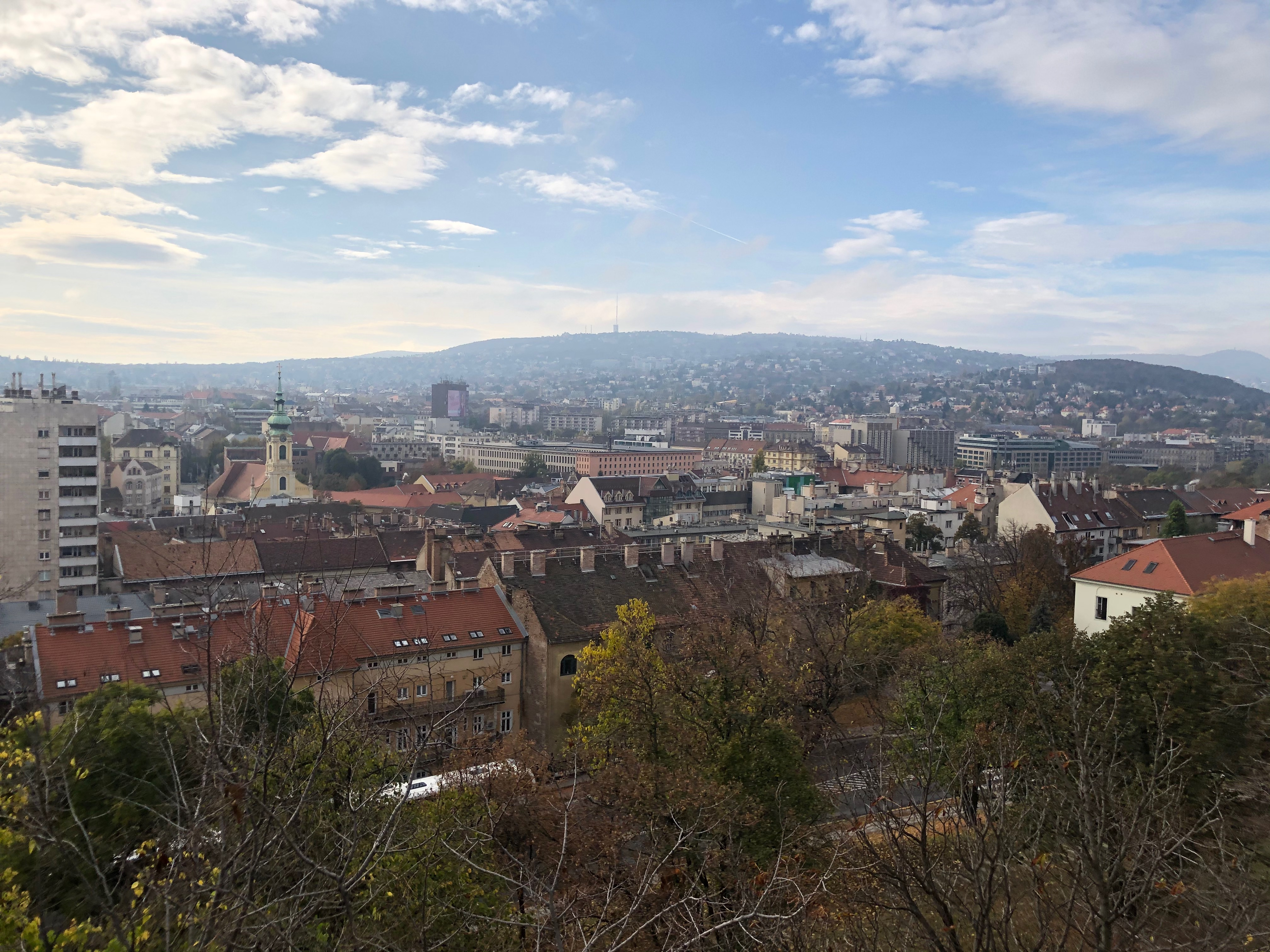
Buda hills

The only district in Buda without a connection to the river Danube, it lies on the green, hilly suburban area of Budapest. It borders 2nd district to the north, the 1st district (Castle district and Gellérthegy) to the east and 11th district (Kelenföld and Sashegy) to the south. Its western border marks the border of the whole city as well. Hegyvidék is said to be the lung of Budapest, as it gives place to many of the untouched green forests of the city and it also houses the highest hill of the entire urban area, János Hill (527 m above sea level).

== Neighbourhoods ==
The district lies on 26.7 square kilometers and has around 60 thousand inhabitants. It has several neighbourhoods: Budakeszierdő, Csillebérc, Farkasrét, Farkasvölgy, Istenhegy, János Hill, Kissvábhegy, Krisztinaváros, Kútvölgy, Magasút, Mártonhegy, Németvölgy, Orbánhegy, Sashegy, Svábhegy, Széchenyihegy, Virányos, Zugliget.

== List of mayors ==
Member	Party	Date
Gábor Sebes	SZDSZ	1990–1994
István Udvardy-Nagy	MDF	1994–1998
György Mitnyan	Fidesz	1998–2006
Zoltán Pokorni	Fidesz	2006–2024
Gergely Kovács	MKKP	2024-

== Twin towns ==
Hegyvidék is twinned with:

- Arad, Romania

== Gallery ==
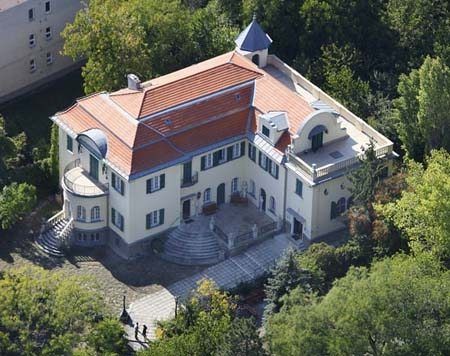

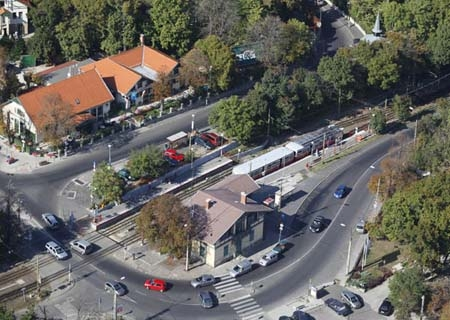

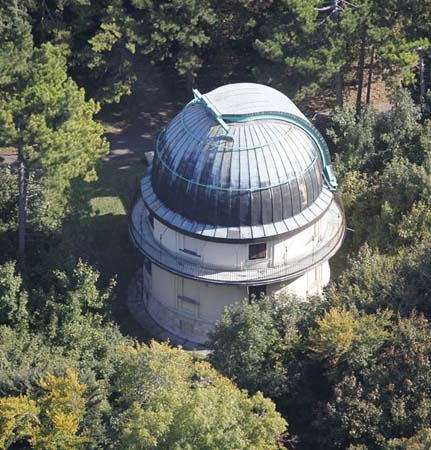

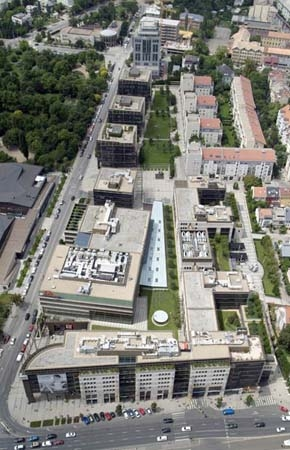

== See also ==
- List of districts in Budapest
