= Nemzeti Dohánybolt =

Government-controlled shop that sells tobacco products in Hungary

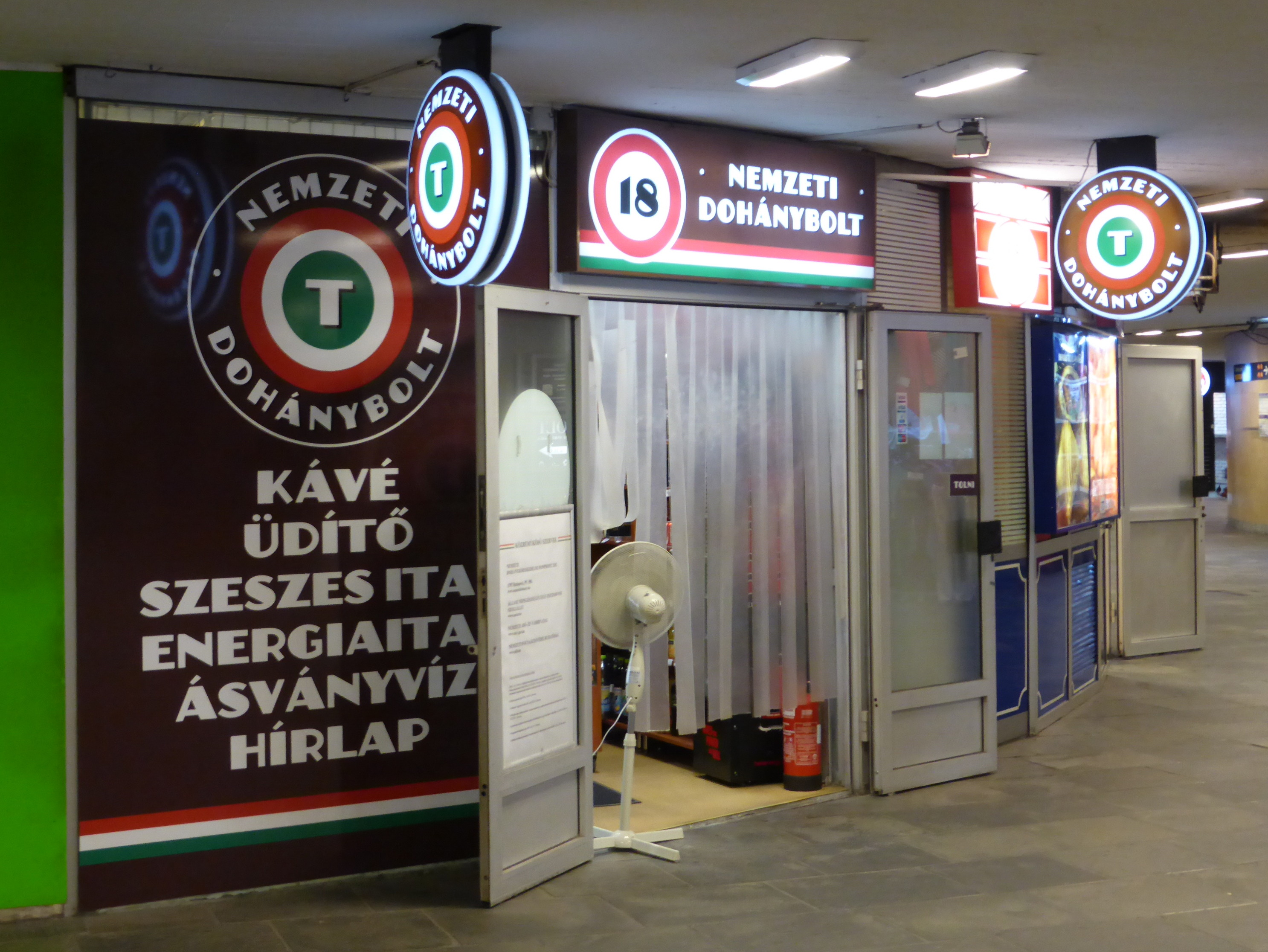
An example of a dohánybolt in Budapest, Hungary

Nemzeti Dohánybolt (Hungarian for 'national tobacco store') is a state-owned store responsible for all legal sales of tobacco within Hungary. The company responsible for running the stores, Nemzeti Dohánykereskedelmi Nonprofit Zrt, was founded in 2011 after the Second Orbán Government passed laws intended to curb the sale of tobacco.

The shops must not have goods on display to those outside. Depending on the size of the shop, they also may often serve coffee and soft drinks, but it is illegal to smoke in a dohánybolt. Some of the larger stores have tables outside and have essentially become cafés.

The government allowed the opening of one store for every 2,000 residents in each city. Later on, the limit was lowered to 3,000 people per store.

== History ==
When tobacco shops first opened in 2013, one shop was allowed to operate per 2,000 inhabitants in each municipality. This population threshold was later increased to 3,000, and subsequently to 4,000. However, no existing tobacco shop lost its concession as a result of these changes. According to the plans, no new tobacco shops would be opened in any town to replace those that had closed due to expired, returned, or revoked concessions until the total number of tobacco shops in that area decreases to the level permitted under the amended tobacco law.

Until April 2015, the opening of tobacco shops and participation in retail trade were decided through a tender system; since then, however, all newly opened tobacco shops have obtained the right to sell tobacco products through direct designation. In theory, designated tobacco shops may operate temporarily, until a new tender is announced – however, no new tender has been issued since 2015. When the tobacco law was amended in 2019, János Lázár intended to close those designated tobacco shops that were operating in areas where a shop was already active based on a concession tender. This would have been made possible by reducing the number of tobacco shops required to operate in a single area through the legislative amendment, meaning that maintaining the shops Lázár wished to close was no longer justified. However, this paragraph was later removed from the law without explanation, so these tobacco shops ultimately did not close.

== General Rules ==
=== Operations ===
The authorization to open a tobacco shop is decided by the National Tobacco Trade Nonprofit Ltd. (abbreviated ND Nonprofit Zrt. or NDN Zrt.) through a tender system. In the case of a successful application, a concession contract must be concluded, which is valid for 20 years. Tobacco retail activity may be carried out by an individual entrepreneur or a business entity that is domiciled in a member state of the European Union or in a state that is part of the European Economic Area. In the case of a business entity, the application may still be submitted by a natural person. At most five concession contracts may be active for a single person at the same time, and in settlements where the population allows multiple tobacco shop concessions, a single person may be granted no more than two-thirds of the concessions.

The contract is concluded with NDN Zrt., which is 100% state-owned. The retailer's concession fee varies depending on the size of the settlement, ranging (excluding VAT) from 100,000 HUF to 240,000 HUF per year.

During the application process, it is verified whether the premises comply with legal requirements and whether the framework for tobacco retail activity is lawful. Considerations regarding the premises include its location, external and internal layout, range of products that may be sold, opening hours, complaint handling procedures, and methods of informing customers, among others.

To open a tobacco store a license must be obtained from the Nemzeti Dohánykereskedelmi Nonprofit Zrt. (NDN Zrt.) using the public tender system. If the agency approves the petition, a contract must be signed which permits the license holder to operate the store for 20 years.

=== Legal background and developments ===
The second Orbán government fundamentally change the regulations governing the distribution and sale of tobacco products. The government cliaime that the primary purpose of the changes is to reduce the number of young smokers in the country. In 2011, the government elevated tobacco trade to one of the state’s exclusive economic activities through Act CXCVI of 2011 on National Assets.

The operational conditions for tobacco shops are detailed in Act CXXXIV of 2012 on the Restriction of Tobacco Use among Minors and the Retail Sale of Tobacco Products. This law has been amended several times since 2012, with the following changes enacted.

- Government Decree 181/2013 (VI. 7.) established certain rules for the licensing procedures related to tobacco retail activity.
- Amendment by Act CCXXIV of 2015 introduced stricter regulations on the purchase of tobacco products, including electronic cigarettes. It also expanded the scope of the law to include additional tobacco-related products and accessories.
- Amendment by Act CXXI of 2019 further expanded the list of products that can be sold in tobacco shops, including flavored milk drinks, batteries, chargers, and certain confectionery items. It also introduced provisions related to the sale of electronic cigarettes and refill containers.

On 23 December 2014, Act XCV of 2014 was promulgated, amending several laws necessary for the integrated supply of tobacco retail.[34]

Government Decree 406/2016 (XII. 10.) regulates the record-keeping and reporting obligations of tobacco retailers, as well as detailed rules for the reporting and publication of tobacco product prices.[35]

== Criticism ==
Since its introduction, the system has faced criticism, primarily due to irregularities in the tenders, the excessive profits of tobacco wholesalers, and certain controversial elements of regulation, such as the broad and constantly expanding range of products allowed to be sold in tobacco shops. Contrary to the original plans, tobacco shops have been allowed from the start to sell lottery tickets, sports bets, and scratch cards, despite the fact that gambling addiction affects approximately 2.5 million people in Hungary. Also contrary to the original plans, tobacco shops may sell alcoholic beverages, even though the number of alcoholics in Hungary is estimated at 1–1.2 million. Additionally, and again contrary to the original intent, tobacco shops may sell energy drinks, coffee, soft drinks, mineral water, and newspapers. Furthermore, the 2014 amendment to the tobacco law allowed tobacco shops to sell chewing gum, menthol candies, public transport tickets, and prepaid mobile phone cards. The 2019 amendment further expanded the range of products that may be sold to include: paper tissues; flavored milk drinks classified as non-refrigerated milk-based beverages; batteries, accumulators, and chargers used for powering or operating electronic devices; packaged tea; tea or liquid chocolate intended for on-site consumption (and related supplementary products such as sugar or milk powder); and confectionery. This expansion contradicts the original government intent that tobacco shops should not operate as general stores, i.e., they should not compete with grocery stores and tobacco products should not be available as part of everyday shopping.

Tobacco shops have also faced criticism for selling basic equipment used for marijuana consumption, even though marijuana is illegal in Hungary.

Further criticism has been directed at the positive discrimination tobacco shops receive regarding the sale of alcoholic beverages. Municipalities cannot prohibit tobacco shops from selling alcohol between 10 p.m. and 6 a.m., unlike other shops. In 2019, Máté Kocsis, parliamentary group leader of Fidesz, submitted an amendment to János Lázár’s restrictive tobacco law proposal in order to eliminate this discriminatory situation. However, Kocsis later withdrew his amendment without explanation.
