= Gergely Kovács (politician) =

Hungarian politician (born 1980)

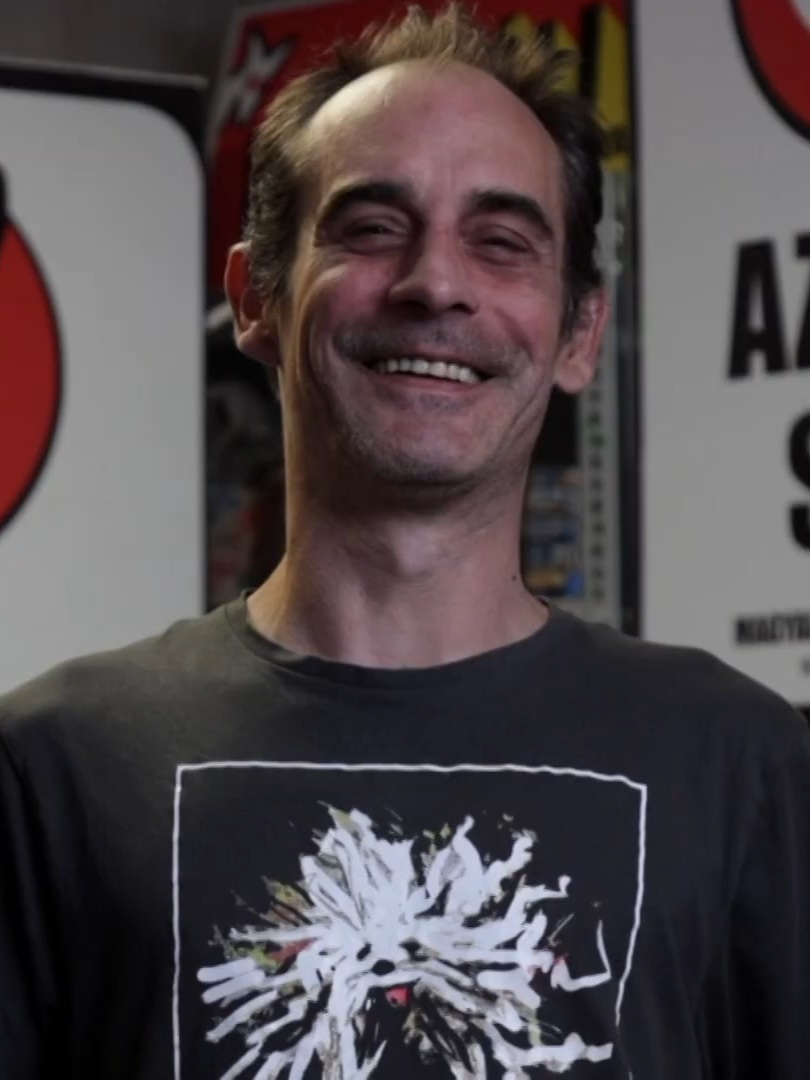
- Kovács in 2024

Mayor of Hegyvidék
- Incumbent
- Assumed office 1 October 2024
- Preceded by: Zoltán Pokorni

Personal details
- Born: 9 January 1980 (age 46) Budapest, Hungary
- Party: MKKP (since 2006)
- Occupation: Politician, graphic designer

Gergely Kovács (born 9 January 1980) is a graphic designer, co-chair of the Hungarian Two-Tailed Dog Party and mayor of the XII. district of Budapest.

== Life and politics ==
His first street art works appeared in 2005 in Szeged, during his university years.

In 2016 in Pécs Kovács and nine others painted the cracks in the pavement according to the four color theorem, for which an employer of Biokom called the police, who took them into custody for suspected graffiti.

In 2017, Kovács appeared in Echo TV where the politically charged anti-Olympics campaign was the topic of discussion. In the program he jokingly admitted to being an spokesman of George Soros and disgraced Hungarian oligarch Lajos Simicska and that hidden powers are operating the Hungarian Two-Tailed Dog Party. The program, having been uploaded to the YouTube channel of Echo TV, became the most-watched video in a few days.

The Two-tailed Dog Party was closely involved in the campaign during the October 2016 migrant quota referendum, mocking the government's anti-immigrant messages and phrases. In response to government posters which read "Did you know?" followed by claimed facts about immigration, the party spent €100,000 of voluntary donations from 4,000 people on posters with satirical slogans, such as "Did you know there's a war in Syria?", "Did you know one million Hungarians want to emigrate to Europe?", "Did you know? The perpetrators in most corruption cases are politicians" and "Did you know? During the Olympics, the biggest danger to Hungarian participants came from foreign competitors". Gergely Kovács told BBC News that "... What we can do is appeal to the millions in Hungary who are upset by the government campaign. We want them to know they are not alone". The party asked people to cast invalid ballots in the referendum. Eventually, 6% of the voters cast a spoiled ballot.

== Local government ==
Kovács was lead candidate of the Hungarian Two-Tailed Dog Party list in both the 2018 and 2022 parliamentary elections, and won a council seat from the same party's list in the 2019 local elections in the 12th district of Budapest (Hegyvidék).

He was a candidate for mayor in the 2024 local elections, having won a ranked-choice opposition primary against two other candidates with 61% of the vote in the first round of counting. Kovács won the mayorship with a landslide victory of 54% of votes against the candidate of Fidesz, which party held the mayorship and majority in the district for the previous terms.
