= Tamás Bauer =

Hungarian economist

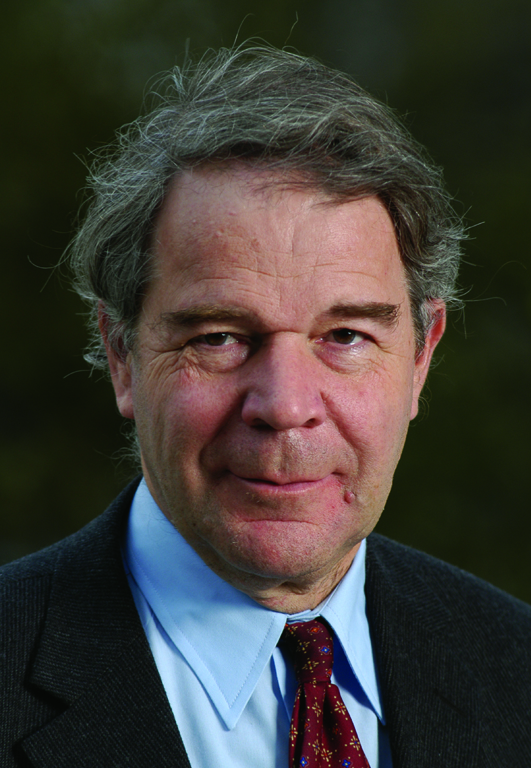

Member of the National Assembly
- In office 28 June 1994 – 14 May 2002

Personal details
- Born: 6 May 1946 (age 79) Budapest, Hungary
- Party: MSZMP, SZDSZ, DK
- Spouse: Aranka Verebélyi
- Children: János; Zsuzsa
- Profession: economist, politician

Tamás Bauer (born May 6, 1946) is a Hungarian economist, politician and member of the National Assembly (MP) from June 28, 1994 to May 14, 2002. His research areas are the Eastern European planned economies.

== Biography ==
He was born into a Jewish family. His parents were Miklós Bauer (1921–2008), jurist and infamous interrogation officer of the State Protection Authority (ÁVH) and Judit Schönberg, a functionary. He has a younger sister, Judit (born 1951). Bauer married Aranka Verebélyi, an economist in 1969. They have two children: János (born 1970) and Zsuzsa (born 1972).

=== Academic career ===
He graduated from the Radnóti Miklós Grammar School of Eötvös Loránd University, and was then admitted to the Corvinus University of Budapest (then Marx Károly Economics University), where he obtained a degree in 1968. He became a member of the Hungarian Economics Society in that same year. He worked for the Research Institute of Economics of the Hungarian Academy of Sciences (MTA). Later he was promoted to Senior Researcher. In 1984, he defended his PhD thesis in economics. In 1988, he served as a university professor of the Department of Comparison and Transformation of Economic Systems in the University of Frankfurt, and later became head of that department. He was a member of the Commission of Economics of MTA between 1991 and 1994. He also served as a project manager for the National Fund for Scientific Research from 2004 to 2009.

=== Political career ===
Bauer joined Hungarian Socialist Workers' Party (MSZMP) in 1966 but was expelled from the party eight years later, in 1974 because he did not support further tightening of the approval of abortion. Later he was one of the leading figures of the Democratic Opposition. He published under the pseudonym of Dénes Csonka for the illegal liberal newspaper Beszélő. In 1985 he was elected to a member of the National Council of the Patriotic People's Front. He resigned from that position in 1988 and was one of the initiators of the New March Front (Új Márciusi Front). In that same year he became one of the founding members of the Alliance of Free Democrats (SZDSZ). He was appointed member of the new party's leadership.

In 1985, the Communist party prevented his participation at the parliamentary elections. He was a candidate for the next parliamentary elections but did not obtain a mandate. He became a member of the National Assembly in 1994 and 1998 from the SZDSZ's national list. During the 2002 parliamentary election he lost his mandate. He left the party in 2007 because he disagreed with the policy of the party leadership and what he considered its flawed economic policies.

He joined the newly formed Democratic Coalition (DK) led by former prime minister Ferenc Gyurcsány and became its one of the deputy chairmen on November 6, 2011. He resigned from his position due to personal and ideological reasons on 26 May 2014.

== Personal life ==
He is married since 1969. His wife is Aranka Verebélyi. They have two children - a daughter, Zsuzsa and a son, János.

== Publications ==
- A vállalatok ellentmondásos helyzete a magyar gazdasági mechanizmusban (1975)
- Beruházási ciklusok a tervgazdaságban. A reform előtti tervgazdaságok esete (1978)
- Tervgazdaság, beruházás, ciklusok (1981)
- The New Hungarian Forms of Enterprise Management and their Economic Environment (1986)
- Two Remarks on Socialism and Reforms (1991)
