= 2008 United States Senate elections =

- November 4, 2008 (Note: A runoff election was held in Georgia on December 2.)
- Class 2

35 (Note: 33 Class 2 seats, as well as 2 Class 1 seats in special election) of the 100 seats in the United States Senate 51 seats needed for a majority
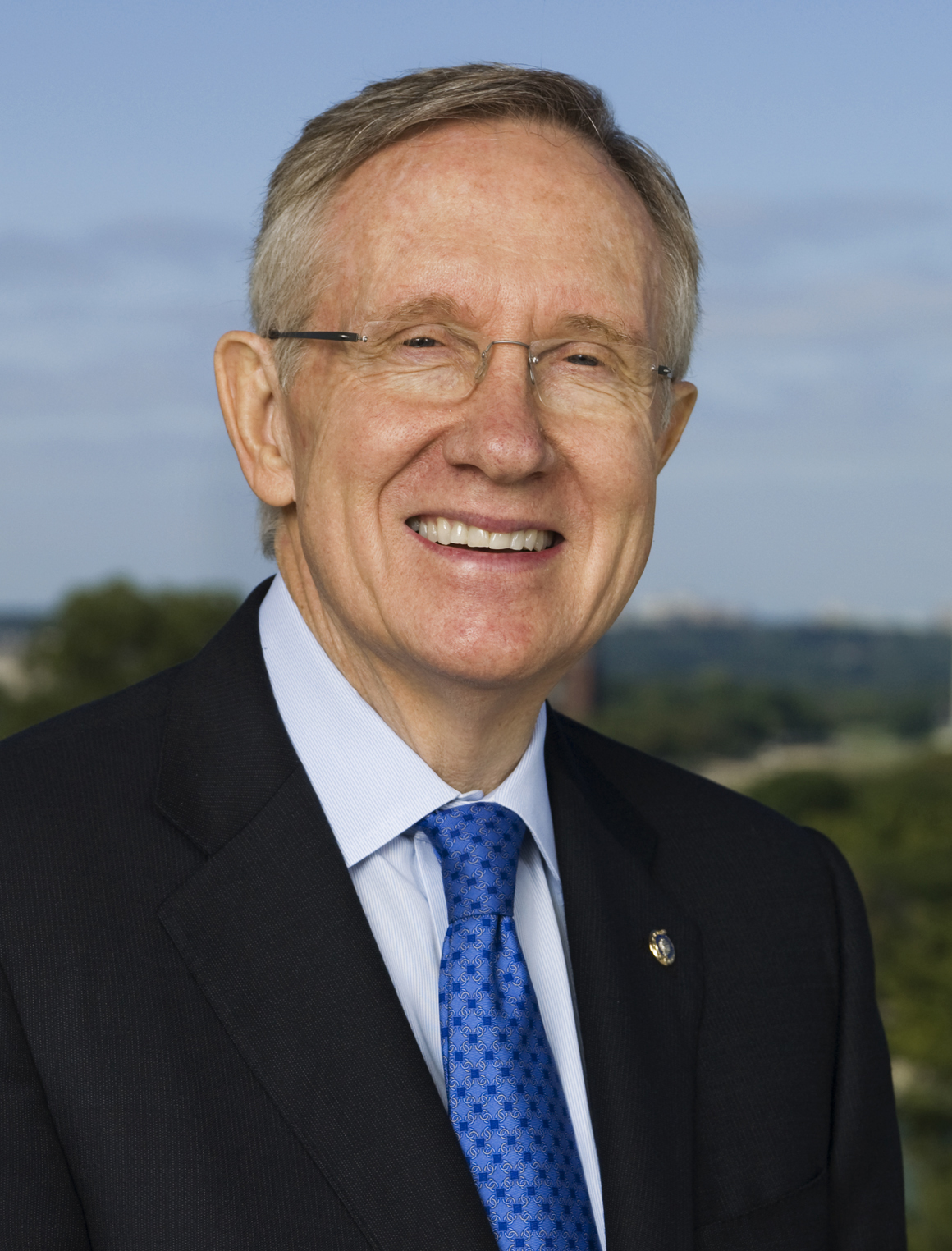

	Majority party	Minority party
Leader	Harry Reid	Mitch McConnell
Party	Democratic	Republican
Leader since	January 3, 2005	January 3, 2007
Leader's seat	Nevada	Kentucky
Seats before	49	49
Seats after	57	41
Seat change	▲8	▼8
Popular vote	33,650,061 (Note: For the Georgia senate race, votes from the runoff election are counted.)	28,863,067
Percentage	51.88%	44.50%
Seats up	12	23
Races won	20	15
	Third party
Party	Independent
Seats before	2 (Note: Although Joe Lieberman (CT) was elected in 2006 on the Connecticut for Lieberman ticket, most sources (including himself) refer to him as an independent Democrat and he is included here as an independent.)
Seats after	2 (Note: Both independents caucused with the Democrats.)
Seat change	Steady
Popular vote	176,752
Percentage	0.27%
Seats up	0
Races won	0
- Results of the elections: Democratic hold Democratic gain Republican hold No election Rectangular inset (Miss. & Wyo.): both seats up for election
Majority Leader before election
Harry Reid
Democratic
Elected Majority Leader
Harry Reid
Democratic

The 2008 United States Senate elections were held on November 4, 2008, with 35 of the 100 seats in the Senate being contested. 33 seats were up for regular elections; the winners were eligible to serve 6-year terms from January 3, 2009, to January 3, 2015, as members of Class 2. There were also 2 special elections, the winners of those seats would finish the terms that ended on January 3, 2013. The presidential election, which was won by Democrat Barack Obama, elections for all House of Representatives seats; elections for several gubernatorial elections; and many state and local elections occurred on the same date.

Going into these elections, the Senate consisted of 49 Democrats, 49 Republicans, and 2 Independents who caucused with the Democrats, giving the Democratic caucus the slightest 51–49 majority. Of the seats up for election in 2008, 23 were held by Republicans and 12 by Democrats. The Republicans, who openly conceded early on that they would not be able to regain the majority in this election, lost 8 seats. Democratic candidates defeated Republican incumbents in Alaska, New Hampshire, North Carolina, Oregon, and, after a lengthy recount process, Minnesota. Additionally, they won Republican-held open seats in Colorado, New Mexico, and Virginia.

Each major party has Hill committees that work to support its candidates for the House and Senate, chiefly by providing funds. On the Senate side, the committees are the Democratic Senatorial Campaign Committee (DSCC) and the National Republican Senatorial Committee (NRSC). In this cycle, the DSCC was more successful at fundraising. As of June 30, 2008, data from the Federal Election Commission showed the NRSC with $24.6 million on hand, as compared with the DSCC's $43 million. The NRSC chair, senator John Ensign, took the unusual step of chastising the Republican Senators who, like him, were not facing re-election, and who he thought should have done more to help raise money for their colleagues.

This election cycle was the second cycle in a row in which no seats switched from Democratic to Republican, and the first since 1990 in which the Democrats retained all their seats. In addition, this was the largest Democratic Senate gain since 1986, where they also won 8 seats. These elections marked the first time since 1964 in which a Democratic presidential candidate who won the White House had a Senate coattail effect. As of 2026, this is the last time Democrats won U.S. Senate seats in Arkansas, Louisiana, and South Dakota. This Democratic Party victory in a majority of Class 2 Senate seats in a regularly scheduled election would not be repeated until 2026. This would also be the last time that Democrats would win senate races in Alaska, Iowa, and North Carolina until 2026.

Along with 2 independents who caucus with them, Democrats held at least 58 seats as a result of the elections. The April 2009 party switch of Pennsylvania senator Arlen Specter from Republican to Democrat and the July 2009 resolution of the Minnesota election in favor of Democrat Al Franken increased the Democratic majority to 60–40 (briefly providing the Democrats a filibuster-proof majority, and thus they were able to hypothetically override any filibusters). Republicans gained a seat in a January 2010 special election in Massachusetts, thereby making the balance 59–41 before the start of the next election cycle.

== Results summary ==
↓
57	2	41

Democratic	Independent	Republican

Summary of the 2008 United States Senate elections results

Parties									Total
Parties		Democratic	Republican	Independent	Libertarian	Independence	Green	Others	Total
Before these elections		49	49	2	—	—	—	—	100
Not up	Class 1 (2006→2012)	22	8	2	—	—	—	—	31
Not up	Class 3 (2004→2010)	15	19	—	—	—	—	—	34
Not up	Total	37	26	2	—	—	—	—	65
Up	Class 1	—	2	—	—	—	—	—	2
Up	Class 2	12	21	—	—	—	—	—	33
Up	Total	12	23	—	—	—	—	—	35
Incumbent retired	Total before	—	5	—	—	—	—	—	5
Incumbent retired	Held by same party	—	2	—	—	—	—	—	2
Incumbent retired	Replaced by other party	▼3 Republicans replaced by ▲3 Democrats		—	—	—	—	—	3
Incumbent retired	Result after	3	2	—	—	—	—	—	5
Incumbent ran	Total before	12	18	—	—	—	—	—	30
Incumbent ran	Won election	12	13	—	—	—	—	—	25
Incumbent ran	Lost election	▼5 Republicans replaced by ▲5 Democrats		—	—	—	—	—	5
Incumbent ran	Result after	17	13	—	—	—	—	—	30
Net gain/loss		▲8	▼8	—	—	—	—	—	8
Total elected		20	15	—	—	—	—	—	35
Nation-wide vote	Votes (Note: For the Georgia senate race, votes from the runoff election are counted.)	33,650,061	28,863,067	176,752	798,154	450,702	427,427	496,124	64,862,287
Nation-wide vote	Share	51.88%	44.50%	0.27%	1.23%	0.69%	0.66%	0.76%	100%
Result		57	41	2	—	—	—	—	100

Sources:

- Clerk of the U.S. House of Representatives
- U.S. Senate Popular Vote and FEC Total Receipts by Party, via TheGreenPapers.com
- "U.S. Senate (Full results)". CNN. July 1, 2009.
- "The Green Papers 2008 U.S. Senate Popular Vote and FEC Total Receipts by Party". The Green Papers.

== Change in composition ==
=== Before the elections ===
D_{1}	D_{2}	D_{3}	D_{4}	D_{5}	D_{6}	D_{7}	D_{8}	D_{9}	D_{10}
D_{20}	D_{19}	D_{18}	D_{17}	D_{16}	D_{15}	D_{14}	D_{13}	D_{12}	D_{11}
D_{21}	D_{22}	D_{23}	D_{24}	D_{25}	D_{26}	D_{27}	D_{28}	D_{29}	D_{30}
D_{40} Ill. Ran	D_{39} Del. Ran	D_{38} Ark. Ran	D_{37}	D_{36}	D_{35}	D_{34}	D_{33}	D_{32}	D_{31}
D_{41} Iowa; Ran	D_{42} La. Ran	D_{43} Mass. Ran	D_{44} Mich. Ran	D_{45} Mont. Ran	D_{46} N.J. Ran	D_{47} R.I. Ran	D_{48} S.D. Ran	D_{49} W.Va. Ran	I_{1}
Majority (with Independents) ↑									I_{2}
R_{41} Tenn. Ran	R_{42} Texas; Ran	R_{43} Wyo. (reg); Ran	R_{44} Wyo. (sp); Ran	R_{45} Colo. Retired	R_{46} Idaho; Retired	R_{47} Neb. Retired	R_{48} N.M. Retired	R_{49} Va. Retired	I_{2}
R_{40} S.C. Ran	R_{39} Ore. Ran	R_{38} Okla. Ran	R_{37} N.C. Ran	R_{36} N.H. Ran	R_{35} Miss. (sp); Ran	R_{34} Miss. (reg); Ran	R_{33} Minn. Ran	R_{32} Me. Ran	R_{31} Ky. Ran
R_{21}	R_{22}	R_{23}	R_{24}	R_{25}	R_{26}	R_{27} Ala. Ran	R_{28} Alaska; Ran	R_{29} Ga. Ran	R_{30} Kan. Ran
R_{20}	R_{19}	R_{18}	R_{17}	R_{16}	R_{15}	R_{14}	R_{13}	R_{12}	R_{11}
R_{1}	R_{2}	R_{3}	R_{4}	R_{5}	R_{6}	R_{7}	R_{8}	R_{9}	R_{10}

=== After the elections ===
D_{1}	D_{2}	D_{3}	D_{4}	D_{5}	D_{6}	D_{7}	D_{8}	D_{9}	D_{10}
D_{20}	D_{19}	D_{18}	D_{17}	D_{16}	D_{15}	D_{14}	D_{13}	D_{12}	D_{11}
D_{21}	D_{22}	D_{23}	D_{24}	D_{25}	D_{26}	D_{27}	D_{28}	D_{29}	D_{30}
D_{40} Ill. Re-elected	D_{39} Del. Re-elected	D_{38} Ark. Re-elected	D_{37}	D_{36}	D_{35}	D_{34}	D_{33}	D_{32}	D_{31}
D_{41} Iowa; Re-elected	D_{42} La. Re-elected	D_{43} Mass. Re-elected	D_{44} Mich. Re-elected	D_{45} Mont. Re-elected	D_{46} N.J. Re-elected	D_{47} R.I. Re-elected	D_{48} S.D. Re-elected	D_{49} W.Va. Re-elected	D_{50} Alaska; Gain
Majority →									D_{51} Colo. Gain
R_{41} Wyo. (sp); Elected (Note: Appointee elected)	Vacant; Minn. Disputed	I_{2}	I_{1}	D_{56} Va. Gain	D_{55} Ore. Gain	D_{54} N.C. Gain	D_{53} N.M. Gain	D_{52} N.H. Gain	D_{51} Colo. Gain
R_{40} Wyo. (reg); Re-elected	R_{39} Texas; Re-elected	R_{38} Tenn. Re-elected	R_{37} S.C. Re-elected	R_{36} Okla. Re-elected	R_{35} Neb. Hold	R_{34} Miss. (sp); Elected	R_{33} Miss. (reg); Re-elected	R_{32} Me. Re-elected	R_{31} Ky. Re-elected
R_{21}	R_{22}	R_{23}	R_{24}	R_{25}	R_{26}	R_{27} Ala. Re-elected	R_{28} Ga. Re-elected	R_{29} Idaho; Hold	R_{30} Kan. Re-elected
R_{20}	R_{19}	R_{18}	R_{17}	R_{16}	R_{15}	R_{14}	R_{13}	R_{12}	R_{11}
R_{1}	R_{2}	R_{3}	R_{4}	R_{5}	R_{6}	R_{7}	R_{8}	R_{9}	R_{10}

=== Beginning of the first session ===
D_{1}	D_{2}	D_{3}	D_{4}	D_{5}	D_{6}	D_{7}	D_{8}	D_{9}	D_{10}
D_{20}	D_{19}	D_{18}	D_{17}	D_{16}	D_{15}	D_{14}	D_{13}	D_{12}	D_{11}
D_{21}	D_{22}	D_{23}	D_{24}	D_{25}	D_{26}	D_{27}	D_{28}	D_{29}	D_{30}
D_{40}	D_{39}	D_{38}	D_{37}	D_{36}	D_{35}	D_{34}	D_{33}	D_{32}	D_{31}
D_{41}	D_{42}	D_{43}	D_{44}	D_{45}	D_{46}	D_{47}	D_{48}	D_{49}	D_{50}
Majority →									D_{51}
I_{2}	I_{1}	D_{58} Minn. Gain	D_{57} Penn. Changed (Note: Arlen Specter, whose seat was not up for election in 2008, joined the Democratic Party on April 28, 2009, the increase of Democrats changed to 57.)	D_{56}	D_{55}	D_{54}	D_{53}	D_{52}	D_{51}
R_{40}	R_{39}	R_{38}	R_{37}	R_{36}	R_{35}	R_{34}	R_{33}	R_{32}	R_{31}
R_{21}	R_{22}	R_{23}	R_{24}	R_{25}	R_{26}	R_{27}	R_{28}	R_{29}	R_{30}
R_{20}	R_{19}	R_{18}	R_{17}	R_{16}	R_{15}	R_{14}	R_{13}	R_{12}	R_{11}
R_{1}	R_{2}	R_{3}	R_{4}	R_{5}	R_{6}	R_{7}	R_{8}	R_{9}	R_{10}

Key:

D_{#}	Democratic
I_{#}	Independent
R_{#}	Republican

== Race summary ==
=== Special elections during the 110th Congress ===
In these special elections, the winner was seated during 2008 or before January 3, 2009, sorted by election date, then state, then class.

State	Incumbent			Results	Candidates
State	Senator	Party	Electoral history	Results	Candidates
Mississippi (Class 1)	Roger Wicker	Republican	2007 (appointed)	Interim appointee elected.	▌ ✓ Roger Wicker (Republican) 55.0%; ▌Ronnie Musgrove (Democratic) 45.0%
Wyoming (Class 1)	John Barrasso	Republican	2007 (appointed)	Interim appointee elected.	▌ ✓ John Barrasso (Republican) 73.4%; ▌Nick Carter (Democratic) 26.5%

=== Elections leading to the next Congress ===
In these general elections, the winners were elected for the term beginning January 3, 2009; ordered by state.

All of the elections involved the Class 2 seats.

State	Incumbent			Results	Candidates
State	Senator	Party	Electoral history	Results	Candidates
Alabama	Jeff Sessions	Republican	1996; 2002	Incumbent re-elected.	▌ ✓ Jeff Sessions (Republican) 63.4%; ▌Vivian Davis Figures (Democratic) 36.5%
Alaska	Ted Stevens	Republican	1968 (appointed); 1970 (special); 1972; 1978; 1984; 1990; 1996; 2002	Incumbent lost re-election. Democratic gain.	▌ ✓ Mark Begich (Democratic) 47.8%; ▌Ted Stevens (Republican) 46.6%; ▌Bob Bird (Alaskan Independence) 4.2%; Others: ▌David Haase (Libertarian) 0.8%; ▌Ted Gianoutsos (Independent) 0.4%
Arkansas	Mark Pryor	Democratic	2002	Incumbent re-elected.	▌ ✓ Mark Pryor (Democratic) 79.5%; ▌Rebekah Kennedy (Green) 20.5%
Colorado	Wayne Allard	Republican	1996; 2002	Incumbent retired. Democratic gain.	▌ ✓ Mark Udall (Democratic) 52.8%; ▌Bob Schaffer (Republican) 42.5%; ▌Doug Campbell (Constitution) 2.6%; ▌Bob Kinsey (Green) 2.1%
Delaware	Joe Biden	Democratic	1972; 1978; 1984; 1990; 1996; 2002	Incumbent re-elected.	▌ ✓ Joe Biden (Democratic) 64.7%; ▌Christine O'Donnell (Republican) 35.3%
Georgia	Saxby Chambliss	Republican	2002	Incumbent re-elected in runoff.	First round: ▌ Saxby Chambliss (Republican) 49.8%; ▌ Jim Martin (Democratic) 46.8%; ▌Allen Buckley (Libertarian) 3.4%; Runoff: ▌ ✓ Saxby Chambliss (Republican) 57.5%; ▌Jim Martin (Democratic) 42.5%
Idaho	Larry Craig	Republican	1990; 1996; 2002	Incumbent retired. Republican hold.	▌ ✓ Jim Risch (Republican) 57.7%; ▌Larry LaRocco (Democratic) 34.1%; ▌Rex Rammell (Independent) 5.4%; Others: ▌Kent Marmon (Libertarian) 1.5%; ▌Pro-Life (Independent) 1.3%
Illinois	Dick Durbin	Democratic	1996; 2002	Incumbent re-elected.	▌ ✓ Dick Durbin (Democratic) 67.8%; ▌Steve Sauerberg (Republican) 28.5%; Others: ▌Kathy Cummings (Green) 2.2%; ▌Larry Stafford (Libertarian) 0.9%; ▌Chad Koppie (Constitution) 0.5%
Iowa	Tom Harkin	Democratic	1984; 1990; 1996; 2002	Incumbent re-elected.	▌ ✓ Tom Harkin (Democratic) 62.7%; ▌Christopher Reed (Republican) 37.3%
Kansas	Pat Roberts	Republican	1996; 2002	Incumbent re-elected.	▌ ✓ Pat Roberts (Republican) 60.0%; ▌Jim Slattery (Democratic) 36.4%; Others: ▌Randall Hodgkinson (Libertarian) 2.1%; ▌Joseph Martin (Reform) 1.3%
Kentucky	Mitch McConnell	Republican	1984; 1990; 1996; 2002	Incumbent re-elected.	▌ ✓ Mitch McConnell (Republican) 53.0%; ▌Bruce Lunsford (Democratic) 47.0%
Louisiana	Mary Landrieu	Democratic	1996; 2002	Incumbent re-elected.	▌ ✓ Mary Landrieu (Democratic) 52.1%; ▌John Kennedy (Republican) 45.7%; Others: ▌Richard Fontanesi (Libertarian) 1.0%; ▌Jay Patel (Independent) 0.7%; ▌Robert Stewart (Independent) 0.5%
Maine	Susan Collins	Republican	1996; 2002	Incumbent re-elected.	▌ ✓ Susan Collins (Republican) 61.3%; ▌Tom Allen (Democratic) 38.6%
Massachusetts	John Kerry	Democratic	1984; 1990; 1996; 2002	Incumbent re-elected.	▌ ✓ John Kerry (Democratic) 65.8%; ▌Jeff Beatty (Republican) 31.0%; ▌Robert Underwood (Libertarian) 3.2%
Michigan	Carl Levin	Democratic	1978; 1984; 1990; 1996; 2002	Incumbent re-elected.	▌ ✓ Carl Levin (Democratic) 62.7%; ▌Jack Hoogendyk (Republican) 33.8%; Others: ▌Scott Boman (Libertarian) 1.6%; ▌Harley Mikkelson (Green) 0.9%; ▌Michael Nikitin (Constitution) 0.6%; ▌Doug Dern (Natural Law) 0.4%
Minnesota	Norm Coleman	Republican	2002	Incumbent lost re-election. Democratic (DFL) gain. Winner delayed term until July 7, 2009, due to election dispute.	▌ ✓ Al Franken (DFL) 41.99%; ▌Norm Coleman (Republican) 41.98%; ▌Dean Barkley (IPM) 15.15%; Others: ▌Charles Aldrich (Libertarian) 0.48%; ▌James Niemackl (Constitution) 0.31%; ▌Write-ins 0.08%
Mississippi	Thad Cochran	Republican	1978; 1984; 1990; 1996; 2002	Incumbent re-elected.	▌ ✓ Thad Cochran (Republican) 61.4%; ▌Erik R. Fleming (Democratic) 38.6%
Montana	Max Baucus	Democratic	1978; 1984; 1990; 1996; 2002	Incumbent re-elected.	▌ ✓ Max Baucus (Democratic) 72.9%; ▌Bob Kelleher (Republican) 27.1%
Nebraska	Chuck Hagel	Republican	1996; 2002	Incumbent retired. Republican hold.	▌ ✓ Mike Johanns (Republican) 57.5%; ▌Scott Kleeb (Democratic) 40.1%; Others: ▌Kelly Rosberg (Nebraska) 1.4%; ▌Steve Larrick (Green) 1.0%
New Hampshire	John E. Sununu	Republican	2002	Incumbent lost re-election. Democratic gain.	▌ ✓ Jeanne Shaheen (Democratic) 51.7%; ▌John E. Sununu (Republican) 45.2%; ▌Ken Blevens (Libertarian) 3.1%
New Jersey	Frank Lautenberg	Democratic	1982; 1982 (appointed); 1988; 1994; 2000 (retired); 2002	Incumbent re-elected.	▌ ✓ Frank Lautenberg (Democratic) 56.0%; ▌Dick Zimmer (Republican) 42.0%; Others: ▌Jason Scheurer (Libertarian) 0.5%; ▌J. M. Carter (Independent) 0.5%; ▌Daryl Mikell Brooks (Independent) 0.5%; ▌Jeffrey Boss (Independent) 0.3%; ▌Sara Lobman (Socialist Workers) 0.3%
New Mexico	Pete Domenici	Republican	1972; 1978; 1984; 1990; 1996; 2002	Incumbent retired. Democratic gain.	▌ ✓ Tom Udall (Democratic) 61.3%; ▌Steve Pearce (Republican) 38.7%
North Carolina	Elizabeth Dole	Republican	2002	Incumbent lost re-election. Democratic gain.	▌ ✓ Kay Hagan (Democratic) 52.7%; ▌Elizabeth Dole (Republican) 44.2%; ▌Chris Cole (Libertarian) 3.1%
Oklahoma	Jim Inhofe	Republican	1994 (special); 1996; 2002	Incumbent re-elected.	▌ ✓ Jim Inhofe (Republican) 56.7%; ▌Andrew Rice (Democratic) 39.2%; ▌Stephen Wallace (Independent) 4.1%
Oregon	Gordon H. Smith	Republican	1996; 2002	Incumbent lost re-election. Democratic gain.	▌ ✓ Jeff Merkley (Democratic) 48.9%; ▌Gordon H. Smith (Republican) 45.6%; ▌Dave Brownlow (Constitution) 5.2%
Rhode Island	Jack Reed	Democratic	1996; 2002	Incumbent re-elected.	▌ ✓ Jack Reed (Democratic) 73.4%; ▌Robert Tingle (Republican) 26.6%
South Carolina	Lindsey Graham	Republican	2002	Incumbent re-elected.	▌ ✓ Lindsey Graham (Republican) 57.5%; ▌Bob Conley (Democratic) 42.3%
South Dakota	Tim Johnson	Democratic	1996; 2002	Incumbent re-elected.	▌ ✓ Tim Johnson (Democratic) 62.5%; ▌Joel Dykstra (Republican) 37.5%
Tennessee	Lamar Alexander	Republican	2002	Incumbent re-elected.	▌ ✓ Lamar Alexander (Republican) 65.1%; ▌Bob Tuke (Democratic) 31.6%; Others: ▌Edward Buck (Independent) 1.3%; ▌Christopher Fenner (Independent) 0.5%; ▌Daniel Lewis (Libertarian) 0.4%; ▌Chris Lugo (Green) 0.4%; ▌Ed Lawhorn (Independent) 0.4%; ▌David Gatchell (Independent) 0.3%
Texas	John Cornyn	Republican	2002; 2002 (appointed)	Incumbent re-elected.	▌ ✓ John Cornyn (Republican) 54.8%; ▌Rick Noriega (Democratic) 42.8%; ▌Yvonne Adams Schick (Libertarian) 2.3%
Virginia	John Warner	Republican	1978; 1984; 1990; 1996; 2002	Incumbent retired. Democratic gain.	▌ ✓ Mark Warner (Democratic) 65.0%; ▌Jim Gilmore (Republican) 33.7%; Others: ▌Bill Redpath (Libertarian) 0.6%; ▌Gail Parker (Independent Green) 0.6%
West Virginia	Jay Rockefeller	Democratic	1984; 1990; 1996; 2002	Incumbent re-elected.	▌ ✓ Jay Rockefeller (Democratic) 63.7%; ▌Jay Wolfe (Republican) 36.3%
Wyoming	Mike Enzi	Republican	1996; 2002	Incumbent re-elected.	▌ ✓ Mike Enzi (Republican) 75.6%; ▌Chris Rothfuss (Democratic) 24.3%

=== Special elections during the next Congress ===
There were no special elections in 2009.

== Closest races ==
In nine races the margin of victory was under 10%. However, Georgia proceeded to a runoff election where the Republican candidate won by over 10%.

District	Winner	Margin
Minnesota	Democratic (flip)	0.01%
Alaska	Democratic (flip)	1.3%
Oregon	Democratic (flip)	3.6%
Georgia general	Republican	3.0%
Kentucky	Republican	5.9%
New Hampshire	Democratic (flip)	6.3%
Louisiana	Democratic	6.4%
North Carolina	Democratic (flip)	8.5%
Mississippi special	Republican	9.9%

South Dakota was the tipping point state, decided by a margin of 25.0%.

== Final pre-election predictions ==
Several sites and individuals published predictions of competitive seats. These predictions looked at factors such as the strength of the incumbent (if the incumbent was running for re-election) and the other candidates, and the state's partisan lean (reflected in part by the state's Cook Partisan Voting Index rating). The predictions assigned ratings to each seat, indicating the predicted advantage that a party had in winning that seat. Most election predictors used:

- "tossup": no advantage
- "tilt" (used by some predictors): advantage that is not quite as strong as "lean"
- "lean": slight advantage
- "likely": significant, but surmountable, advantage
- "safe" or "solid": near-certain chance of victory

Constituency	Incumbent		2008 election ratings				
State	Senator	Last election (Note: The last elections for this group of senators were in 2002, except for those elected in a special election or who were appointed after the resignation or passing of a sitting senator, as noted.)	Cook	CQ Politics	Rothenberg	RCP	Result
Alabama	Jeff Sessions	58.6% R	Safe R	Safe R	Safe R	Safe R	Sessions (63.4%)
Alaska	Ted Stevens	78.2% R	Lean D (flip)	Lean D (flip)	Lean D (flip)	Lean D (flip)	Begich (47.8%)(flip)
Arkansas	Mark Pryor	53.9% D	Safe D	Safe D	Safe D	Safe D	Pryor (79.5%)
Colorado	Wayne Allard (retiring)	50.7% R	Lean D (flip)	Likely D (flip)	Likely D (flip)	Likely D (flip)	M. Udall (52.8%) (flip)
Delaware	Joe Biden	58.2% D	Safe D	Safe D	Safe D	Safe D	Biden (64.7%)
Georgia	Saxby Chambliss	52.8% R	Tossup	Tossup	Lean R	Tossup	Chambliss (57.4%) (Note: This race was decided in a run-off on December 2, 2008, after no candidate reached 50% of the vote on November 3.)
Idaho	Larry Craig (retiring)	65.2% R	Safe R	Safe R	Safe R	Safe R	Risch (57.7%)
Illinois	Dick Durbin	60.3% D	Safe D	Safe D	Safe D	Safe D	Durbin (67.8%)
Iowa	Tom Harkin	54.2% D	Safe D	Safe D	Safe D	Safe D	Harkin (62.7%)
Kansas	Pat Roberts	82.5% R	Safe R	Likely R	Safe R	Safe R	Roberts (60.1%)
Kentucky	Mitch McConnell	64.7% R	Lean R	Lean R	Lean R	Tossup	McConnell (53.0%)
Louisiana	Mary Landrieu	51.7% D	Lean D	Lean D	Lean D	Lean D	Landrieu (52.1%)
Maine	Susan Collins	58.4% R	Likely R	Lean R	Likely R	Likely R	Collins (61.3%)
Massachusetts	John Kerry	80.0% D	Safe D	Safe D	Safe D	Safe D	Kerry (65.9%)
Michigan	Carl Levin	60.6% D	Safe D	Safe D	Safe D	Safe D	Levin (62.7%)
Minnesota	Norm Coleman	49.5% R	Tossup	Tossup	Tossup	Tossup	Franken (42.0%)(flip)
Mississippi (regular)	Thad Cochran	84.6% R	Safe R	Safe R	Safe R	Safe R	Cochran (61.4%)
Mississippi (special)	Roger Wicker	Appointed (2007) (Note: Republican Trent Lott won with 63.6% of the vote in 2006, but resigned on December 18, 2007.)	Tossup	Lean R	Lean R	Lean R	Wicker (55.0%)
Montana	Max Baucus	62.7% D	Safe D	Safe D	Safe D	Safe D	Baucus (72.9%)
Nebraska	Chuck Hagel (retiring)	82.8% R	Likely R	Likely R	Safe R	Likely R	Johanns (57.5%)
New Hampshire	John Sununu	50.8% R	Tossup	Lean D (flip)	Likely D (flip)	Lean D (flip)	Shaheen (51.6%)(flip)
New Jersey	Frank Lautenberg	53.9% D	Safe D	Likely D	Safe D	Likely D	Lautenberg (56.0%)
New Mexico	Pete Domenici (retiring)	65.0% R	Lean D (flip)	Likely D (flip)	Likely D (flip)	Likely D (flip)	T. Udall (61.3%)(flip)
North Carolina	Elizabeth Dole	53.5% R	Tossup	Lean D (flip)	Lean D (flip)	Tossup	Hagan (52.6%)(flip)
Oklahoma	Jim Inhofe	57.3% R	Likely R	Likely R	Safe R	Safe R	Inhofe (56.7%)
Oregon	Gordon Smith	56.2% R	Tossup	Tossup	Lean D (flip)	Tossup	Merkley (48.9%)(flip)
Rhode Island	Jack Reed	78.4% D	Safe D	Safe D	Safe D	Safe D	Reed (73.4%)
South Carolina	Lindsey Graham	54.4% R	Safe R	Safe R	Safe R	Safe R	Graham (57.5%)
South Dakota	Tim Johnson	49.6% D	Likely D	Safe D	Safe D	Safe D	Johnson (62.5%)
Tennessee	Lamar Alexander	54.3% R	Safe R	Likely R	Safe R	Safe R	Alexander (65.1%)
Texas	John Cornyn	55.3% R	Safe R	Likely R	Safe R	Safe R	Cornyn (54.8%)
Virginia	John Warner (retiring)	82.6% R	Likely D (flip)	Safe D (flip)	Likely D (flip)	Safe D (flip)	M. Warner (65.0%)(flip)
West Virginia	Jay Rockefeller	63.1% D	Safe D	Safe D	Safe D	Safe D	Rockefeller (63.7%)
Wyoming (regular)	Mike Enzi	73.0% R	Safe R	Safe R	Safe R	Safe R	Enzi (75.6%)
Wyoming (special)	John Barrasso	Appointed (2007) (Note: Republican Craig L. Thomas won with 70.0% of the vote in 2006, but died on June 4, 2007.)	Safe R	Safe R	Safe R	Safe R	Barrasso (73.4%)

== Gains and losses ==
Map of retirements: Republican incumbent Democratic incumbent Republican incumbent retired

Results of the Senate election by county

=== Retirements ===
Five Republicans retired rather than seek re-election.

State	Senator	Age at end of term	Assumed office	Replaced by
Colorado	Wayne Allard	65	1997	Mark Udall
Idaho	Larry Craig	63	1991	Jim Risch
Nebraska	Chuck Hagel	62	1997	Mike Johanns
New Mexico	Pete Domenici	76	1973	Tom Udall
Virginia	John Warner	81	1979	Mark Warner

=== Defeats ===
Five Republicans sought re-election but lost in the general election.

State	Senator	Age at end of term	Assumed office	Replaced by
Alaska	Ted Stevens	85	1968 (Note: Appointed to the seat following the death of Bob Bartlett.)	Mark Begich
Minnesota	Norm Coleman	59	2003	Al Franken
New Hampshire	John E. Sununu	44	2003	Jeanne Shaheen
North Carolina	Elizabeth Dole	72	2003	Kay Hagan
Oregon	Gordon H. Smith	56	1997	Jeff Merkley

=== Post-election changes ===
Four Democrats resigned and were replaced by Democrats. One Republican was switched to Democrat on April 28, 2009. Two other Democrats died on August 25, 2009, and June 28, 2010, respectively, while another Republican resigned on September 9, 2009.

State	Senator	Replaced by
Colorado (Class 3)	Ken Salazar	Michael Bennet
Delaware (Class 2)	Joe Biden	Ted Kaufman
Florida (Class 3)	Mel Martínez	George LeMieux
Illinois (Class 3)	Barack Obama	Roland Burris
Massachusetts (Class 1)	Ted Kennedy	Paul G. Kirk
New York (Class 1)	Hillary Clinton	Kirsten Gillibrand
Pennsylvania (Class 3)	Arlen Specter	Arlen Specter
West Virginia (Class 1)	Robert Byrd	Carte Goodwin

== Alabama ==
Alabama election
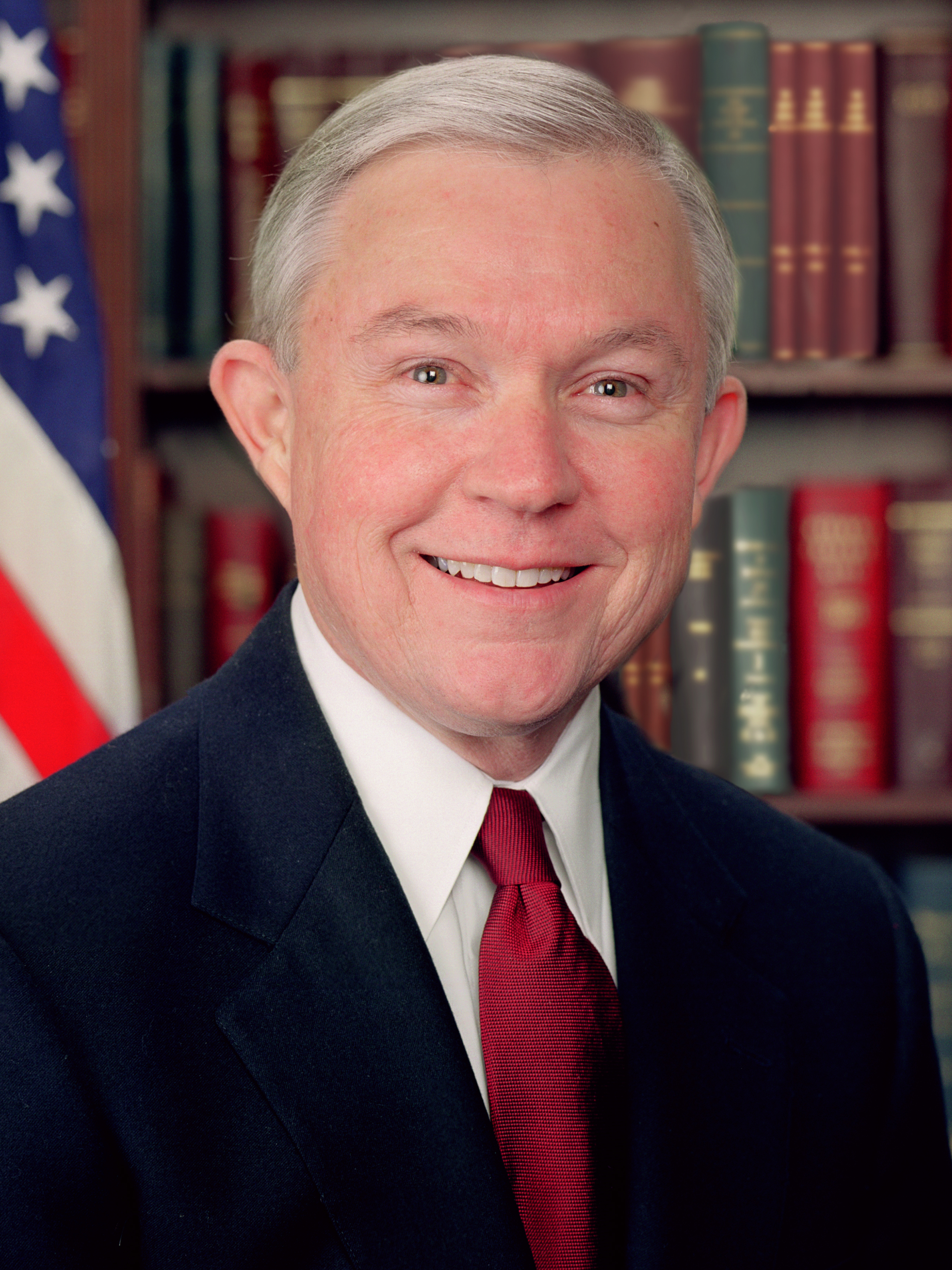

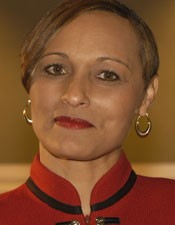
Nominee	Jeff Sessions	Vivian Davis Figures
Party	Republican	Democratic
Popular vote	1,305,383	752,391
Percentage	63.36%	36.52%
- Sessions: 50–60% 60–70% 70–80% 80–90% Figures: 50–60% 60–70% 70–80% 80–90%
U.S. senator before election
Jeff Sessions
Republican
Elected U.S. senator
Jeff Sessions
Republican

Alabama senator Jeff Sessions sought re-election to a third term. Johnny Swanson announced his candidacy in March 2006 for the Democratic nomination.

Despite voting heavily for Bush in 2004, Alabama still had a strong Democratic presence; Democrats controlled majorities of both chambers in the state legislature. Commissioner of Agriculture and Industries Ron Sparks appeared to be preparing for a run, but on June 12, 2007, Sparks announced that he would not seek the Senate seat, in order to avoid a primary battle with state senator Vivian Davis Figures. Figures had won elections in the Republican-leaning Mobile area. In the Democratic primary, Figures won the nomination and faced Sessions in November.

Not on the ballot, but running a write-in campaign, was Darryl W. Perry, the 2004 Libertarian Party nominee for Pennsylvania State Treasurer and 2007 candidate for Mayor of Birmingham, Alabama. Perry was endorsed by Alabama Statesmen, Boston Tea Party, and Christians for Life and Liberty.

Sessions defeated Figures, taking 63% of the vote to Figures's 37%

Republican primary
Party	Candidate	Votes	%
Republican	Jeff Sessions (incumbent)	199,690	92.27%
Republican	Earl Mack Gavin	16,718	7.73%
Total votes		216,408	100.00%

Democratic primary
Party	Candidate	Votes	%
Democratic	Vivian Davis Figures	112,074	63.72%
Democratic	Johnny Swanson	38,757	22.03%
Democratic	Mark Townsend	25,058	14.25%
Total votes		175,889	100.00%

Alabama general
Party	Candidate	Votes	%
Republican	Jeff Sessions (Incumbent)	1,305,383	63.36%
Democratic	Vivian Davis Figures	752,391	36.52%
Write-In	Write-ins	2,417	0.12%
Invalid or blank votes			
Total votes		2,060,191	100.00%
Turnout			N/A
Republican hold			

== Alaska ==
Alaska election
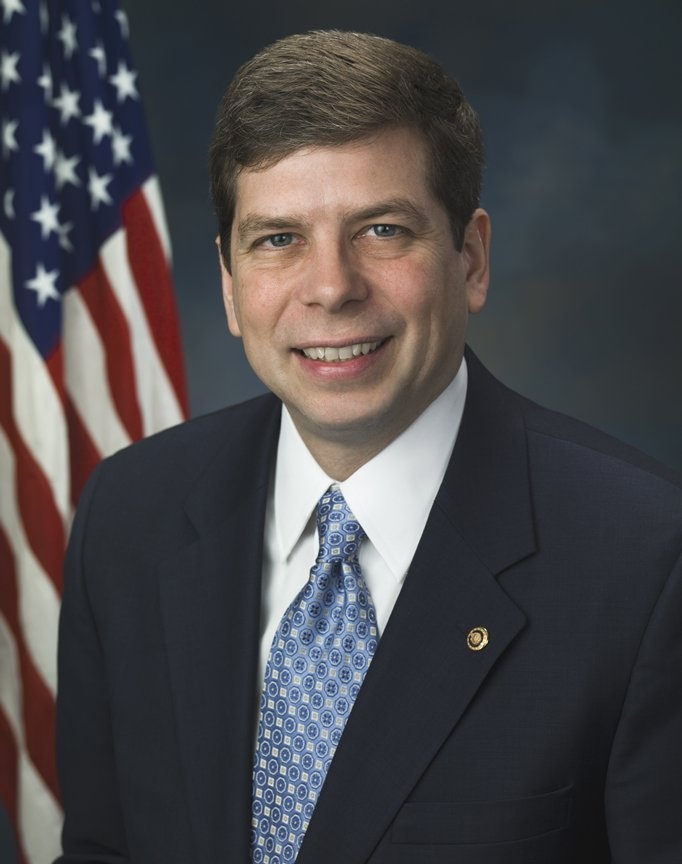

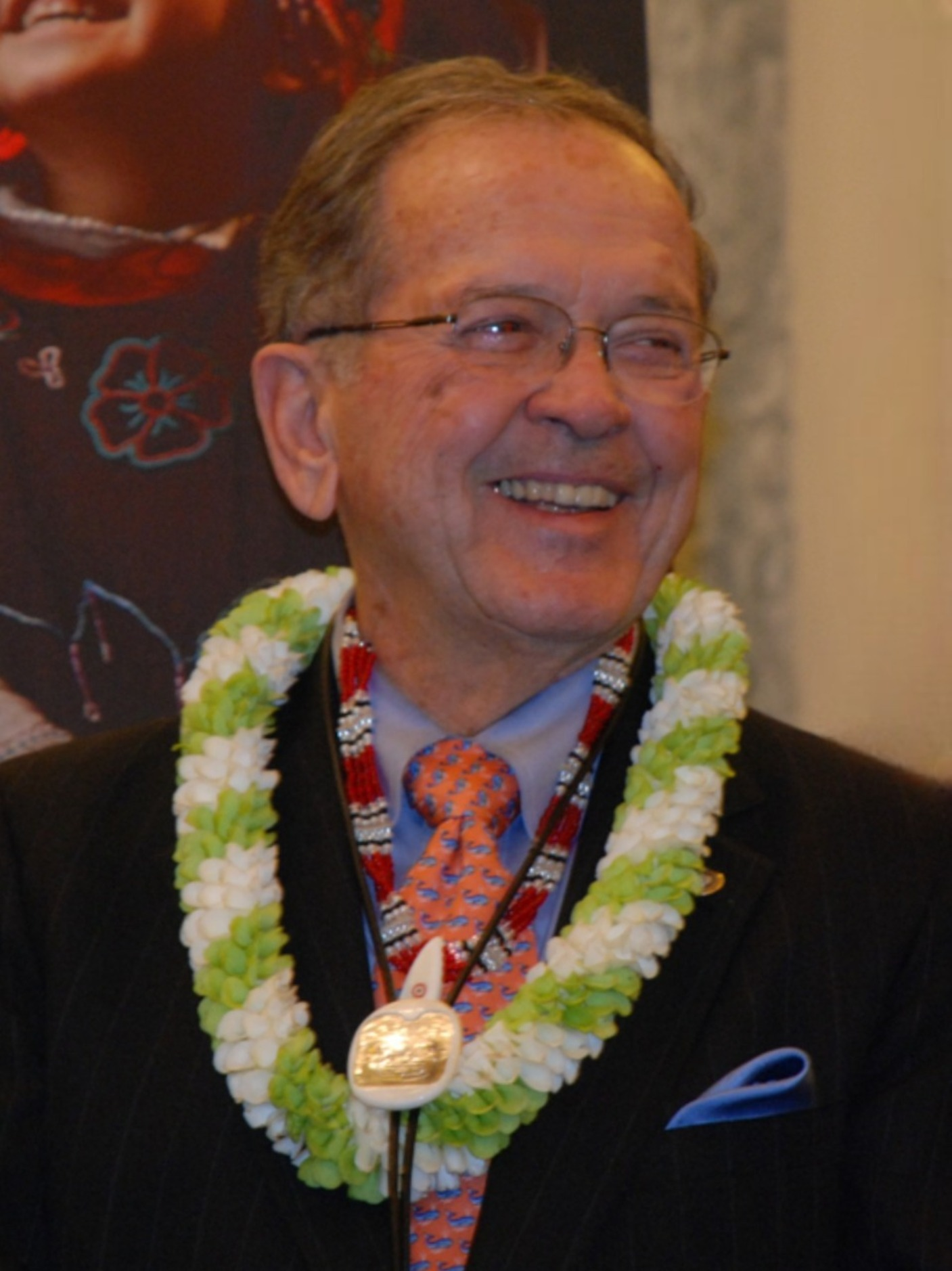
Nominee	Mark Begich	Ted Stevens
Party	Democratic	Republican
Popular vote	151,767	147,814
Percentage	47.8%	46.5%
- Borough and census area results Begich: 40–50% 50–60% 60–70% Stevens: 40–50% 50–60% 60–70%
U.S. senator before election
Ted Stevens
Republican
Elected U.S. senator
Mark Begich
Democratic

Alaska ADL senatorial primary, 2008
Party	Candidate	Votes	%
Democratic	Mark Begich	63,747	84.12%
Democratic	Ray Metcalfe	5,480	7.23%
Independence	Bob Bird	4,216	5.56%
Libertarian	Fredrick Haase	1,375	1.81%
Democratic	Frank Vondersaar	965	1.27%
Total votes		75,783	100.00%

Republican primary
Party	Candidate	Votes	%
Republican	Ted Stevens (incumbent)	66,900	63.52%
Republican	David Cuddy	28,364	26.93%
Republican	Vic Vickers	6,102	5.79%
Republican	Michael Corey	1,496	1.42%
Republican	Roderic Sikma	1,133	1.08%
Republican	Rich Wanda	732	0.69%
Republican	Gerald Heikes	599	0.57%
Total votes		105,326	100.00%

Alaska general
Party	Candidate	Votes	%	±%
Democratic	Mark Begich	151,767	47.77%	+37.26%
Republican	Ted Stevens (Incumbent)	147,814	46.52%	−31.65%
Independence	Bob Bird	13,197	4.15%	+1.22%
Libertarian	Fredrick Haase	2,483	0.78%	−0.25%
Independent	Ted Gianoutsos	1,385	0.44%	
Write-ins		1,077	0.34%	
Majority		3,953	1.24%	−66.42%
Turnout		317,723		
Democratic gain from Republican		Swing		

Dispelling rumors that he would retire due to advanced age (he was 84 years old on election day) and ongoing federal investigations into his conduct, senator Ted Stevens filed papers for re-election for an eighth term.

An ex-oil company executive, Bill Allen, paid for part of the renovation costs on Stevens's personal residence. The FBI investigated the remodeling of Stevens home by Veco Corp., which is part of a broader corruption investigation involving Stevens's son, former State Senate President Ben Stevens. Two former Veco executives have pleaded guilty to paying the younger Stevens $242,000 in bribes. On July 30, 2007, the IRS and FBI raided Stevens's home in Alaska. On September 14, 2007, former Veco CEO Bill Allen testified at the trial of former State House Speaker Pete Kott that Veco paid people working to double the size of Stevens's home.

On July 29, 2008, a federal grand jury indicted Stevens on seven felony counts for making false statements, and on October 26, a jury found Stevens guilty on all charges.

The Democratic candidate was Anchorage Mayor Mark Begich, the son of popular former Democratic Representative Nick Begich. Begich announced his candidacy for the Senate seat on April 22, 2008.

On October 19, 2007, the AP reported that despite the allegations and FBI probe, several veteran GOP Senators—including Orrin Hatch (R-UT), Kay Bailey Hutchison (R-TX), and Kit Bond (R-MO)—donated enough money to Stevens's re-election campaign to make it one of Stevens's most successful fund raising quarters ever.

Stevens's conviction on seven felony counts of corruption damaged his re-election bid, coming just over a week before the election, though Stevens appealed the conviction. Nevertheless, Stevens was narrowly ahead in the vote count after election day, with only about two-thirds of all votes counted. It only became clear Begich had prevailed when early votes, absentee ballots, and questioned ballots were counted.

On November 18, the race was called for Begich, who won with 47.8% to Stevens's 46.5%. Stevens was the most senior U.S. Senator to ever lose re-election, defeating Warren Magnuson's 1980 record. As of 2023, Stevens still holds this record.

On April 1, 2009, U.S. Attorney General Eric Holder, citing serious prosecutorial misconduct during the trial, decided to drop all charges against Stevens—an action that vacated his conviction.

== Arkansas ==
Arkansas election
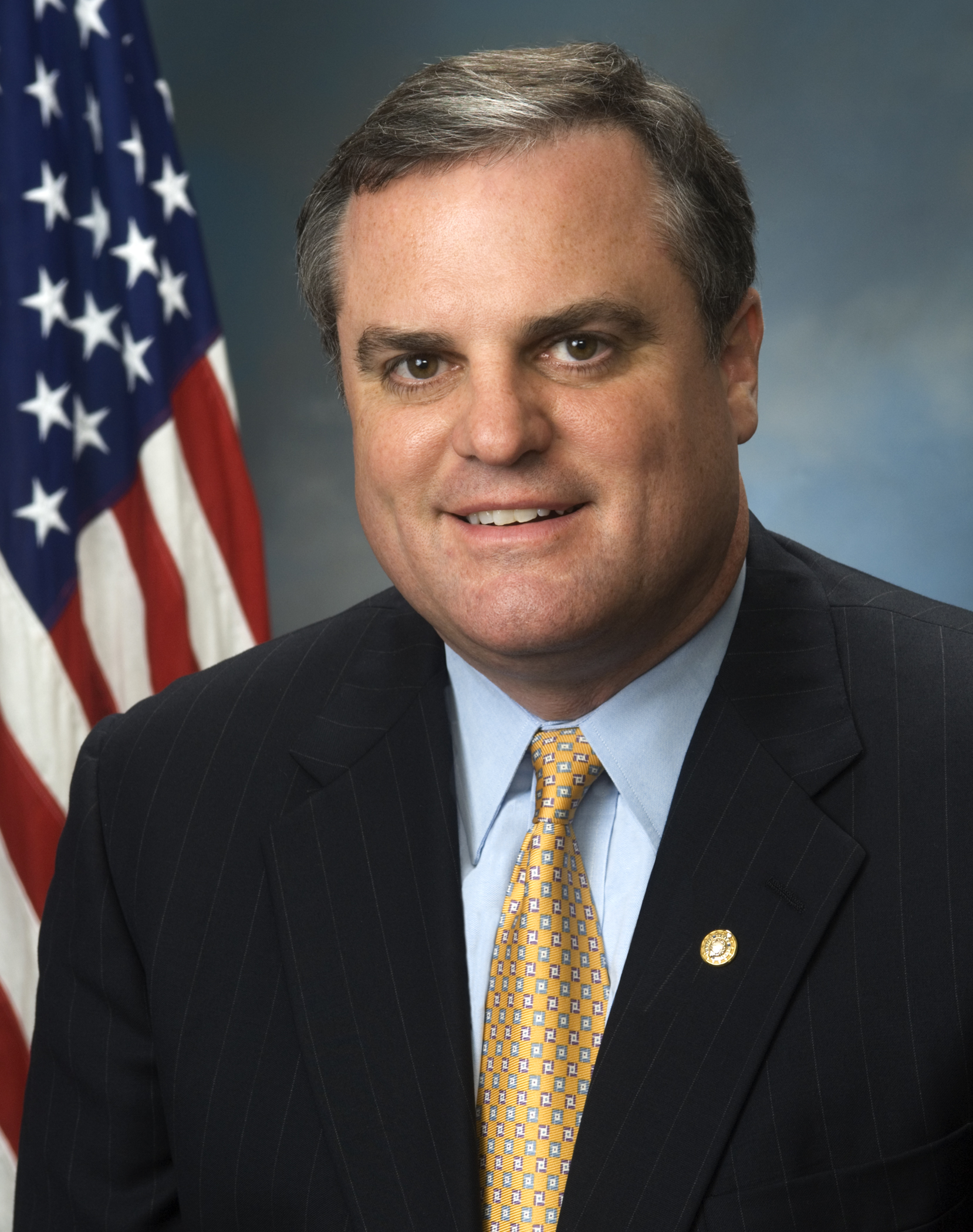

Nominee	Mark Pryor	Rebekah Kennedy
Party	Democratic	Green
Popular vote	804,678	207,076
Percentage	79.5%	20.5%
- County results Pryor: 60–70% 70–80% 80–90%
U.S. senator before election
Mark Pryor
Democratic
Elected U.S. senator
Mark Pryor
Democratic

Arkansas general
Party	Candidate	Votes	%
Democratic	Mark Pryor (Incumbent)	804,678	79.53%
Green	Rebekah Kennedy	207,076	20.47%
Total votes		1,011,754	100.00%
Invalid or blank votes		75,586	n/a
Democratic hold			

Despite being a first-term senator in a state George W. Bush won twice, Democrat Mark Pryor faced no opposition from Republicans in his re-election bid. Although Bush carried the state twice, Arkansas Democrats swept the seven state races held in the 2006 general election. Pryor is the son of longtime U.S. senator and former Arkansas Governor David Pryor. It was rumored that Lt. Governor Bill Halter would challenge Pryor in the primary, but Halter declined to file as a candidate. Rebekah Kennedy of the Green Party was Pryor's only opposition. Pryor won on election day, with 79.53% of the vote. Kennedy took 20.47%.

== Colorado ==
Colorado election
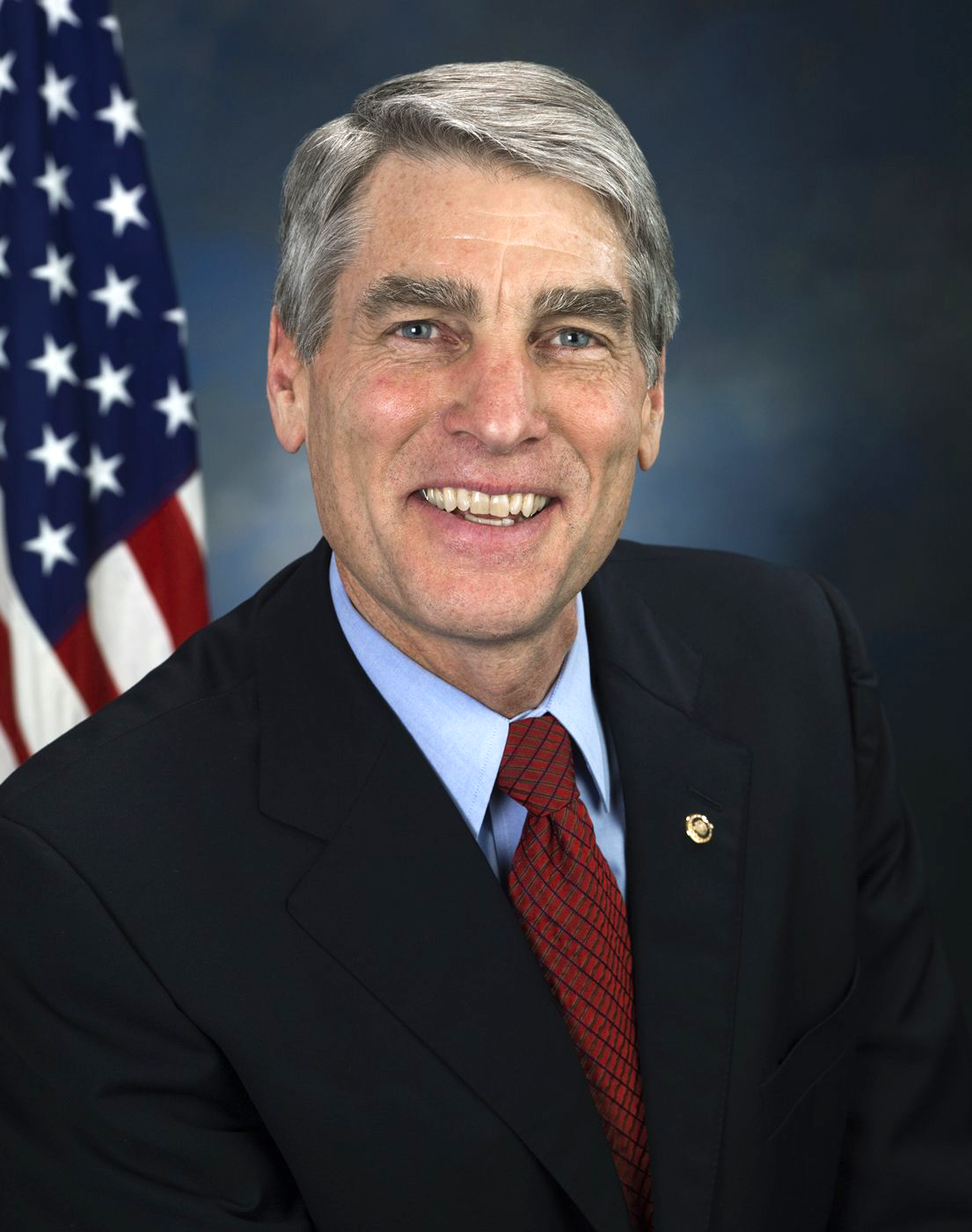

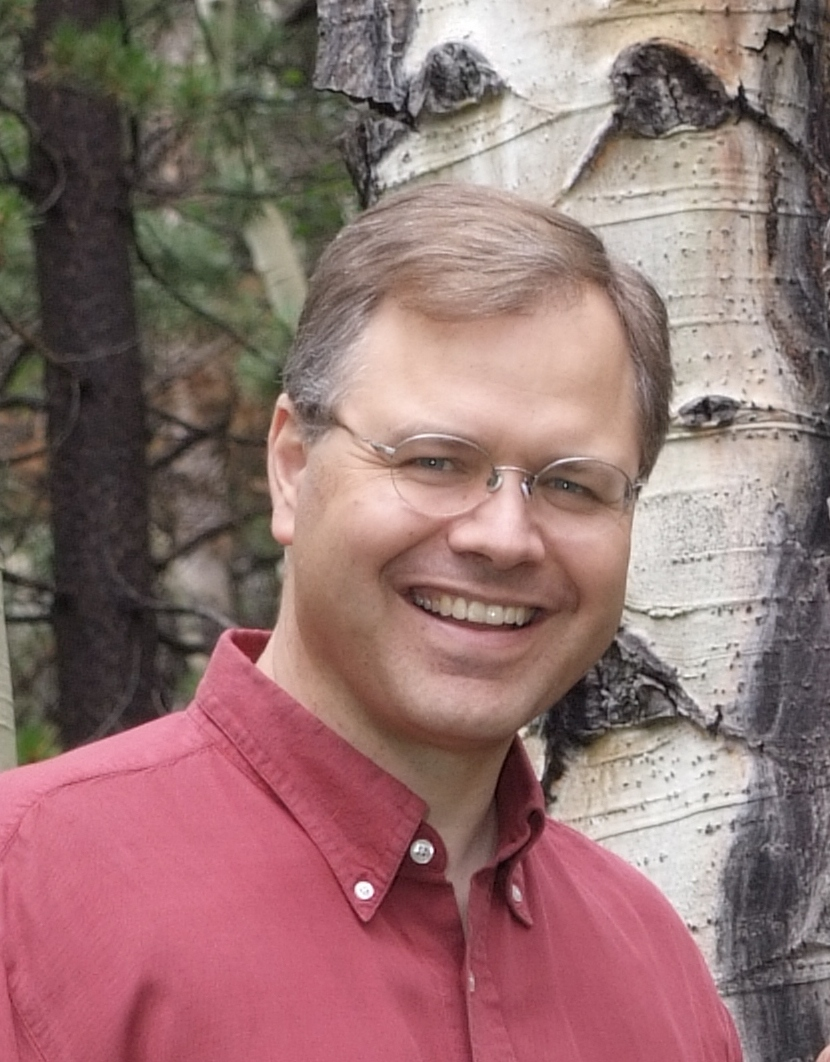
Nominee	Mark Udall	Bob Schaffer
Party	Democratic	Republican
Popular vote	1,230,994	990,755
Percentage	52.8%	42.5%
- Udall: 40–50% 50–60% 60–70% 70–80% Schaffer: 40–50% 50–60% 60–70% 70–80%
U.S. senator before election
Wayne Allard
Republican
Elected U.S. senator
Mark Udall
Democratic

Democratic primary
Party	Candidate	Votes	%
Democratic	Mark Udall	194,227	100.00%
Total votes		194,227	100.00%

Republican primary
Party	Candidate	Votes	%
Republican	Bob Schaffer	239,212	100.00%
Total votes		239,212	100.00%

Colorado general
Party	Candidate	Votes	%	±%
Democratic	Mark Udall	1,230,994	52.80%	+7.03%
Republican	Bob Schaffer	990,755	42.49%	−8.20%
Constitution	Douglas Campbell	59,733	2.56%	+1.04%
Green	Bob Kinsey	50,004	2.14%	
Write-ins		135	0.01%	
Majority		240,239	10.30%	+5.38%
Turnout		2,331,621		
Democratic gain from Republican		Swing		

On January 15, 2007, incumbent senator Wayne Allard (R) announced he would not seek re-election, honoring his pledge to serve no more than two terms.

Former Representative Bob Schaffer of Fort Collins was the Republican nominee. Former Denver Broncos quarterback John Elway was rumored to be considering a run, but declined to do so. Other possible Republican candidates included former Congressman Scott McInnis and Colorado Attorney General John Suthers.

The Democratic nominee was 2nd district Congressman Mark Udall of Boulder who announced on January 15, 2007, that he would seek the seat and did not draw significant primary opposition.

Other candidates included Bob Kinsey of Denver as the Green Party nominee, Douglas "Dayhorse" Campbell as the American Constitution Party's nominee, and Independent candidate Buddy Moore, unaffiliated any party.

On Election Day, Udall defeated Schaffer 53% to 43%.

== Delaware ==
Delaware election
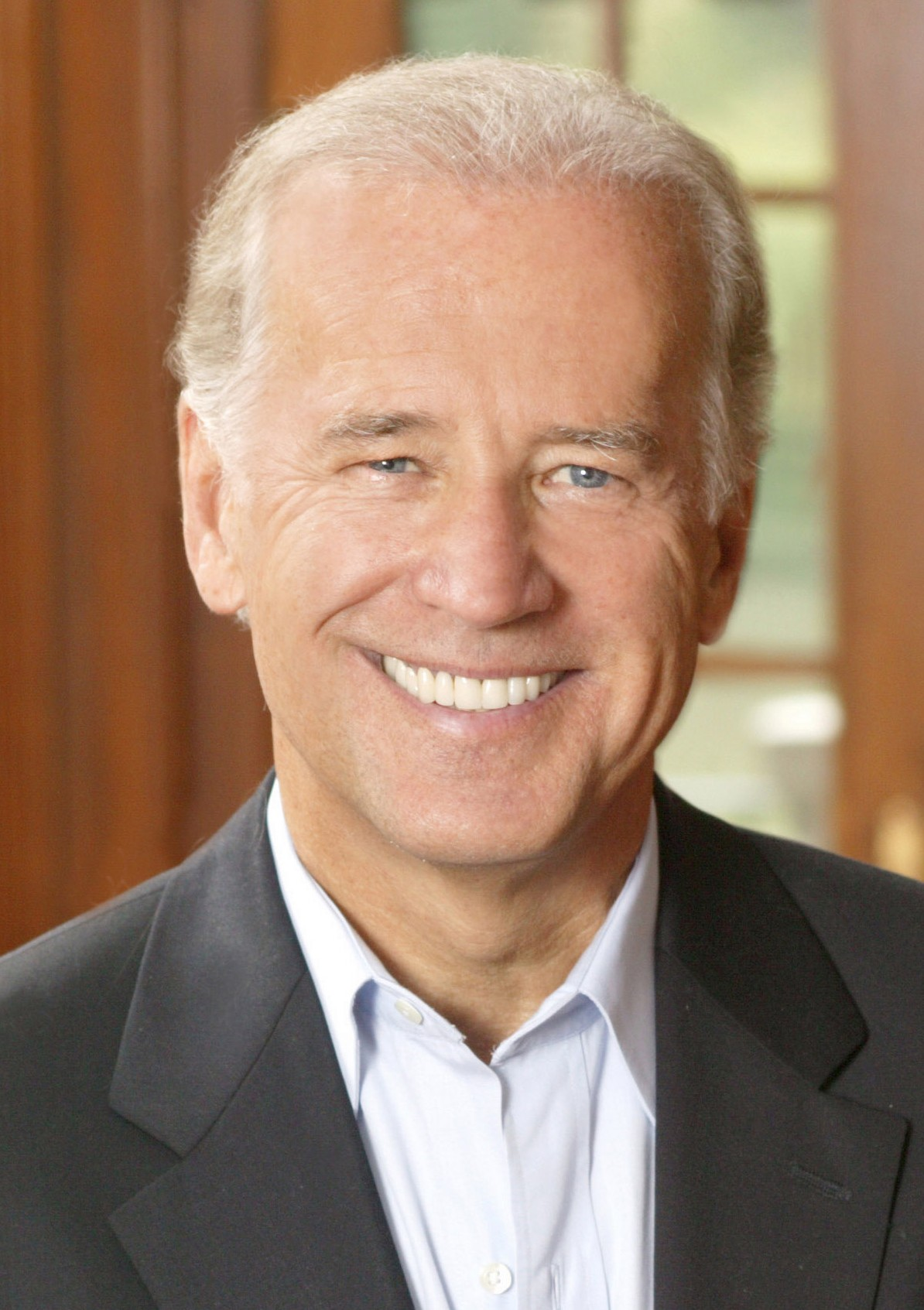

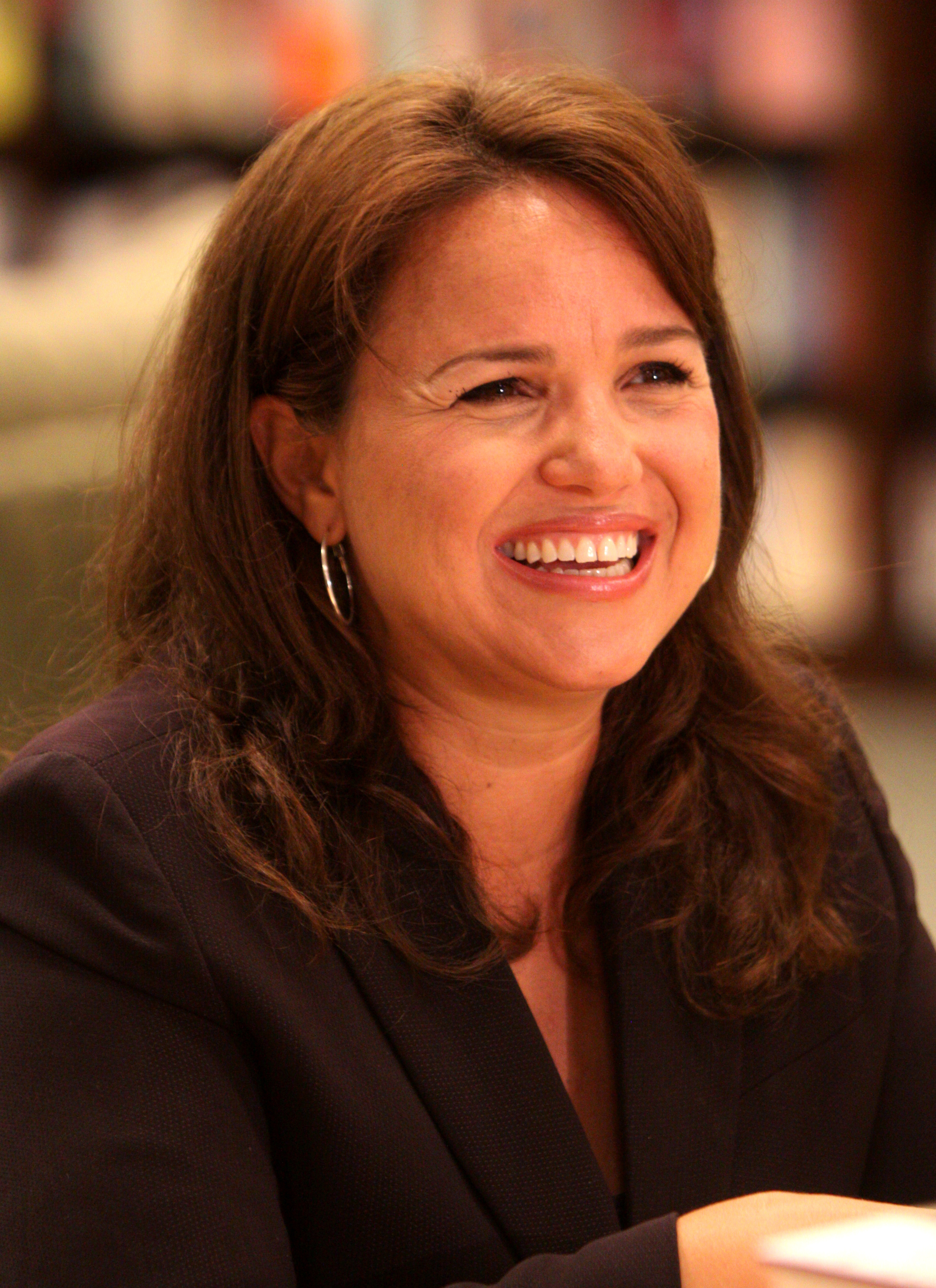
Nominee	Joe Biden	Christine O'Donnell
Party	Democratic	Republican
Popular vote	257,539	140,595
Percentage	64.7%	35.3%
- Biden: 50–60% 70–80%
U.S. senator before election
Joe Biden
Democratic
Elected U.S. senator
Joe Biden
Democratic

Delaware general
Party	Candidate	Votes	%	±%
Democratic	Joe Biden (Incumbent)	257,539	64.69%	+6.47%
Republican	Christine O'Donnell	140,595	35.31%	−5.49%
Majority		116,944	29.37%	+11.96%
Turnout		398,134		
Democratic hold		Swing		

On August 23, 2008, the Democratic nominee for president, Barack Obama, announced that Biden would be joining him on the ticket as the vice presidential nominee. Delaware law allowed Biden to run for vice president and senator at the same time, so he would have kept the Senate seat if the presidential ticket had lost. In 1988 and 2000, the Democratic vice presidential nominees Lloyd Bentsen and Joe Lieberman, ran similarly for their seat in Texas and Connecticut, respectively. On November 4, 2008, Barack Obama won the presidential election, making Biden the next VP. Biden vacated his senate seat shortly after the election, allowing for the Governor of Delaware to appoint a successor. There was speculation as to whether the outgoing Governor, Ruth Ann Minner, or the incoming Governor-elect Jack Markell would make the appointment, and if Biden's son, Delaware Attorney General Beau Biden would receive the appointment. On November 24, 2008, Governor Minner appointed Biden's longtime Chief of Staff Ted Kaufman to fill the seat. Kaufman subsequently announced that he would not seek election to a full term in 2010, effectively making him a caretaker. Biden's Republican opponent in the Senate race, conservative political commentator Christine O'Donnell, tried to make an issue of Biden's dual campaigns, claiming that serving his constituents is not important to him.

Biden was re-elected with 65% of the vote, or 257,484 votes. O'Donnell received 140,584 votes (35% of the vote).

== Georgia ==
2008 United States Senate election in Georgia
- November 4, 2008 (first round); December 2, 2008 (runoff)
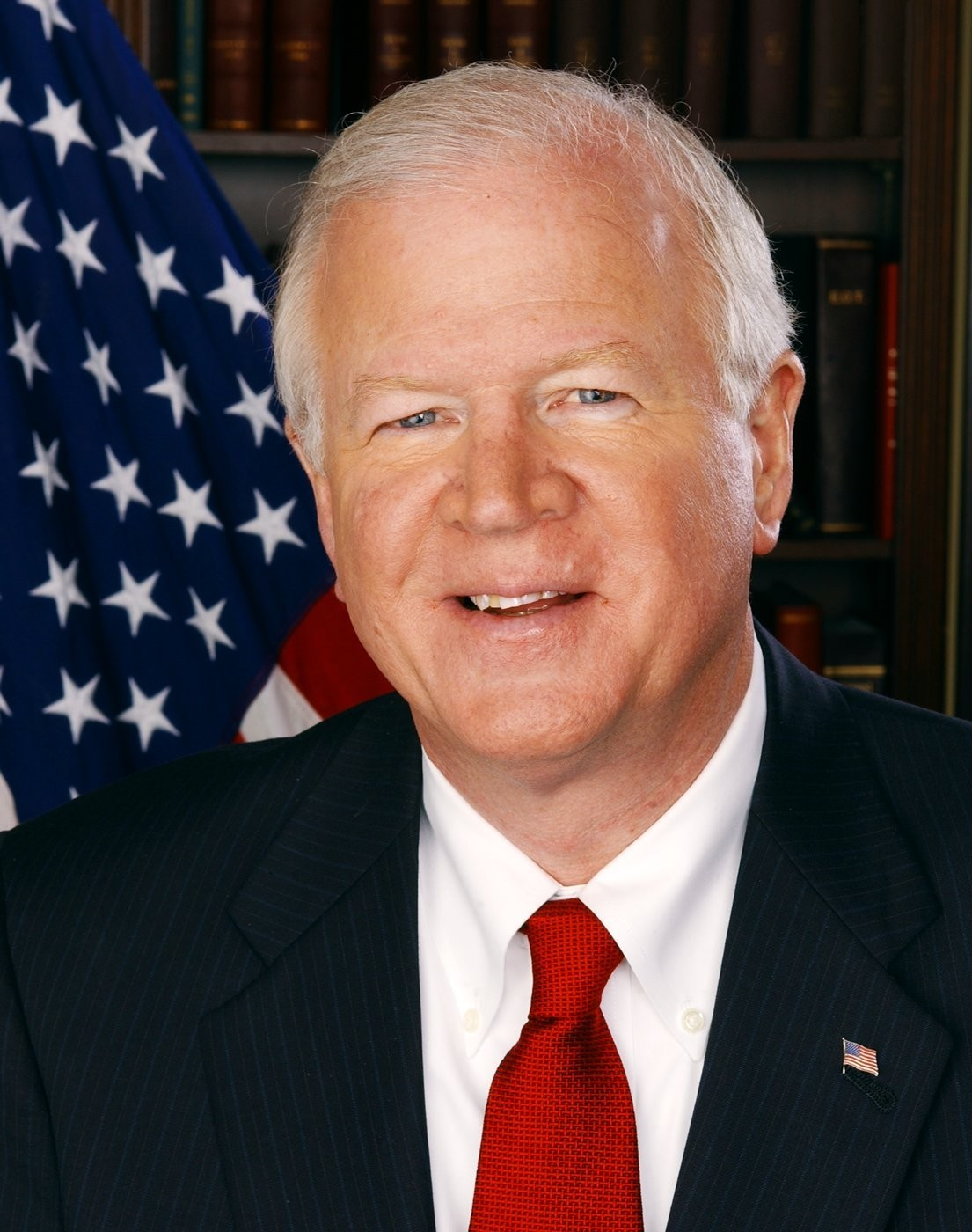

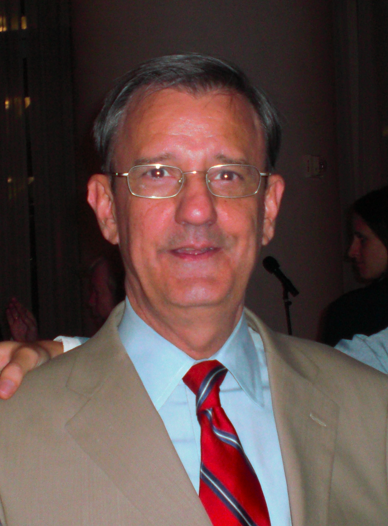
Nominee	Saxby Chambliss	Jim Martin
Party	Republican	Democratic
First round	1,867,097; 49.8%	1,757,393; 46.8%
Runoff	1,228,033; 57.4%	909,923; 42.6%
- Chambliss: 40–50% 50–60% 60–70% 70–80% 80–90% Martin: 40-50% 50–60% 60–70% 70–80% 80–90% Tie: 40–50%
U.S. Senator before election
Saxby Chambliss
Republican
Elected U.S. Senator
Saxby Chambliss
Republican

2008 Georgia U.S. Senate Republican primary
Party	Candidate	Votes	%
Republican	Saxby Chambliss	392,902	100.0%
Turnout		392,928	100.0%

2008 Georgia U.S. Senate Democratic primary
Party	Candidate	Votes	%
Democratic	Vernon Jones	199,026	40.4%
Democratic	Jim Martin	169,635	34.4%
Democratic	Dale Cardwell	79,181	16.1%
Democratic	Rand Knight	25,667	5.2%
Democratic	Josh Lanier	19,717	4.0%
Total votes		493,226	100.0%

2008 Georgia U.S. Senate Democratic primary election runoff
Party	Candidate	Votes	%	±%
Democratic	Jim Martin	191,061	59.9%	+25.5%
Democratic	Vernon Jones	127,993	40.1%	−0.3%
Total votes		319,054	100.0%	

Georgia general
Party	Candidate	Votes	%	±%
Republican	Saxby Chambliss (Incumbent)	1,867,097	49.8%	−3.0%
Democratic	Jim Martin	1,757,393	46.8%	+0.9%
Libertarian	Allen Buckley	127,923	3.4%	+2.1%
Socialist Workers	Eleanor Garcia (write-in)	43	0.0%	n/a
Independent	William Salomone Jr. (write-in)	29	0.0%	n/a
Majority		109,704	2.92%	
Turnout		3,752,577		

Runoff election
Party	Candidate	Votes	%	±%
Republican	Saxby Chambliss (Incumbent)	1,228,033	57.4%	+7.6%
Democratic	Jim Martin	909,923	42.6%	−4.2%
Majority		318,110	14.8%	
Turnout		2,137,956		
Republican hold		Swing		

In the 2008 election, first-term incumbent Republican senator Saxby Chambliss was opposed primarily by Democrat Jim Martin, as well as third-party candidates, including Libertarian Allen Buckley and Eleanor Garcia of the Socialist Workers Party.

Martin, current Georgia Commissioner of Human Resources, former member of the Georgia General Assembly, Vietnam War veteran, and 2006 candidate for lieutenant governor, secured the Democratic nomination after defeating DeKalb County CEO Vernon Jones by a 59% to 41% margin in the August 5 run-off election.

In December 2007, Chambliss had an approval rating of 53% and a disapproval rating of 34% according to Strategic Vision, a Republican polling firm. For most of the campaign, Chambliss maintained a comfortable lead in most polls. However, in the weeks leading up to the 2008 general election, polls showed the race tightening, reflecting a general nationwide trend.

On November 4, 2008, Chambliss received 49.8% of the vote, with Martin about 3% behind and Buckley receiving 3% of the vote. However, Georgia law stated that if no candidate receives a simple majority of the popular vote, then the election will be decided in a run-off. On December 2, 2008, Chambliss won the run-off with 57% of vote to Martin's 43%.

== Idaho ==
Idaho election
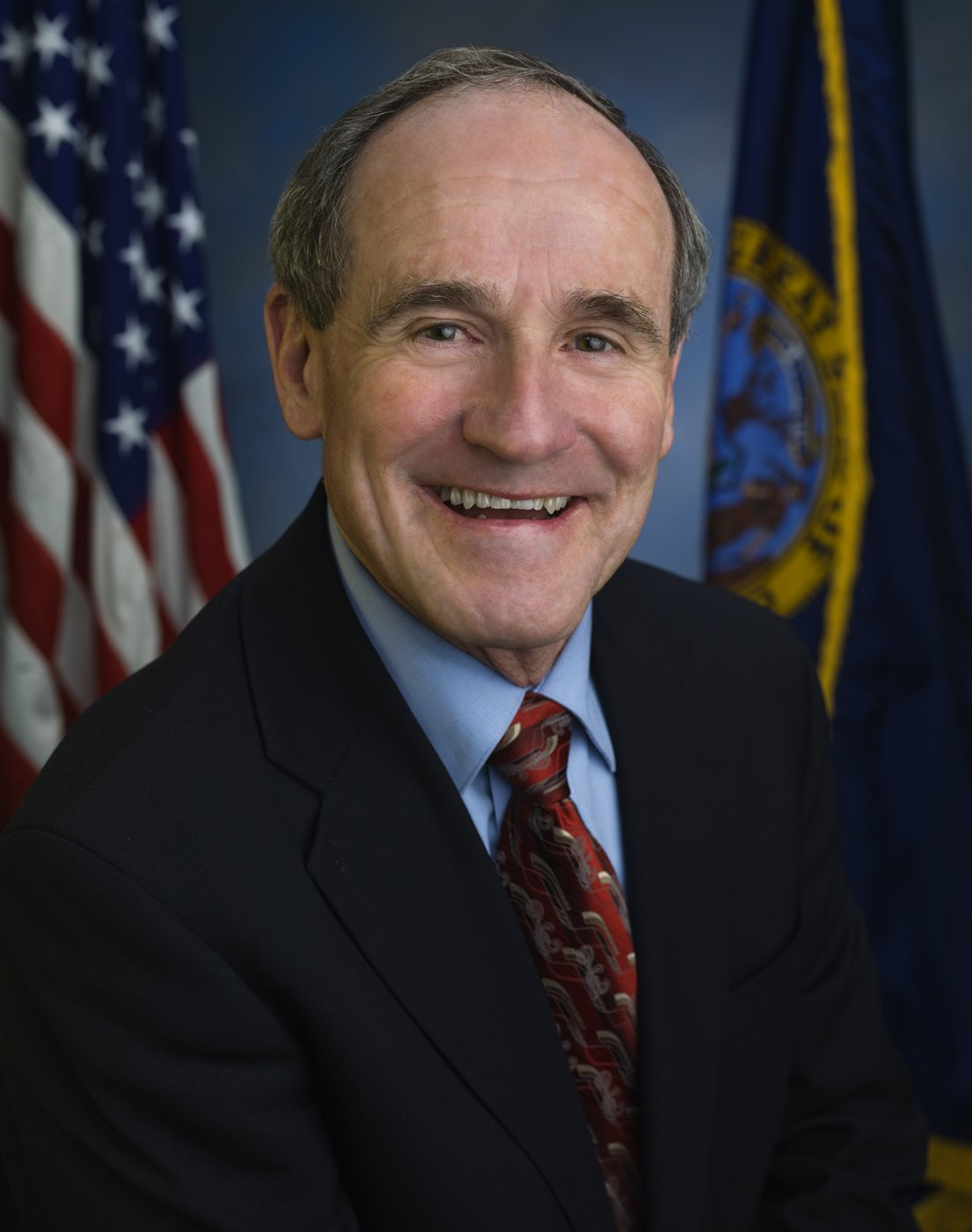

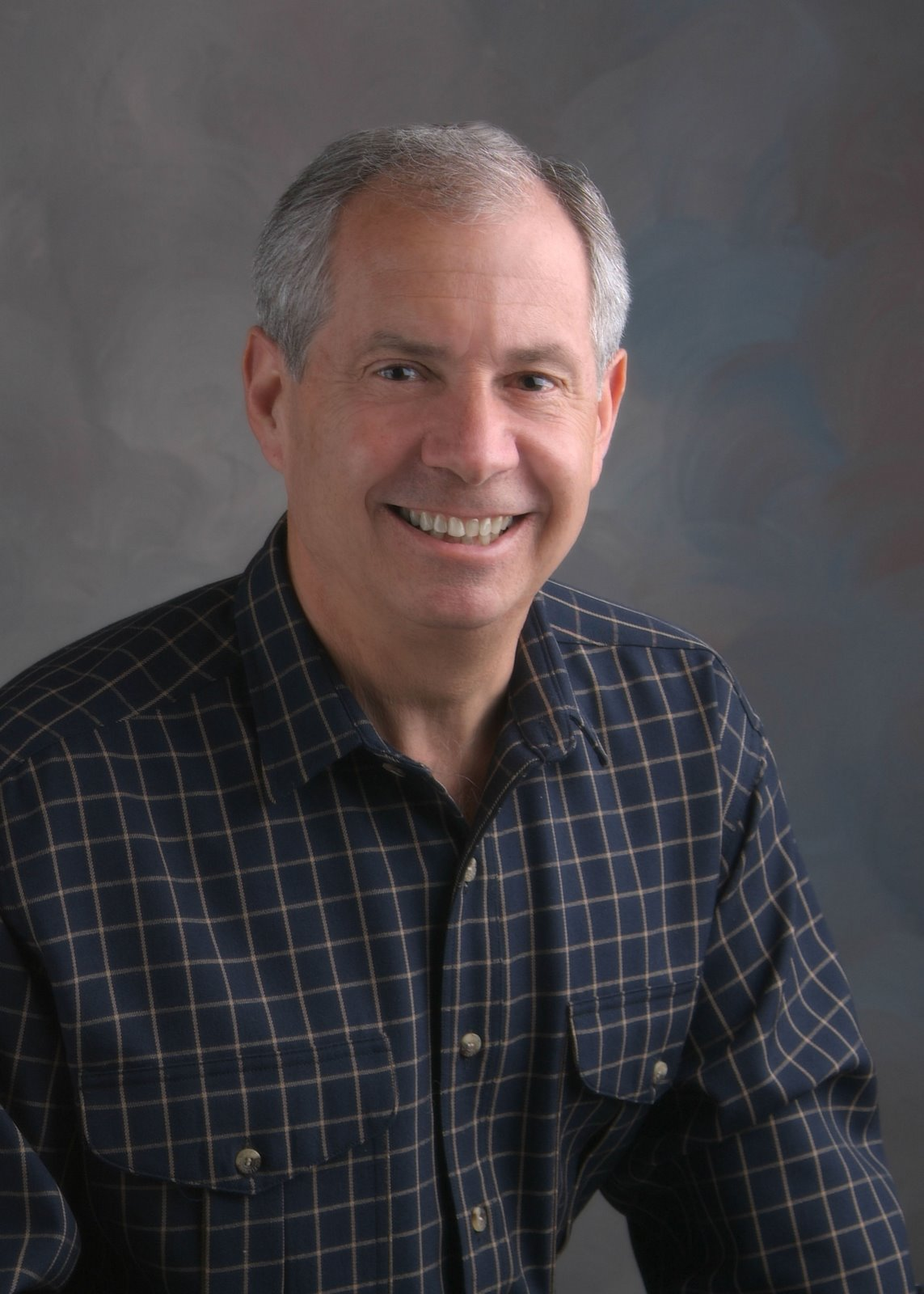
Nominee	Jim Risch	Larry LaRocco
Party	Republican	Democratic
Popular vote	371,744	219,903
Percentage	57.7%	34.1%
Nominee	Rex Rammell
Party	Independent
Popular vote	34,510
Percentage	5.4%
- County results Risch: 50–60% 60–70% 70–80% LaRocco: 40–50% 50–60%
U.S. senator before election
Larry Craig
Republican
Elected U.S. senator
Jim Risch
Republican

Democratic Primary results
Party	Candidate	Votes	%
Democratic	Larry LaRocco	29,023	72.35%
Democratic	David J. Archuleta	11,074	27.60%
Democratic	Write-ins	20	0.05%
Total votes		40,117	100.00%

Republican primary
Party	Candidate	Votes	%
Republican	Jim Risch	80,743	65.34%
Republican	Scott Syme	16,660	13.48%
Republican	Richard Phenneger	6,532	5.29%
Republican	Neal Thompson	5,375	4.35%
Republican	Fred M. Adams	4,987	4.04%
Republican	Bill Hunter	4,280	3.46%
Republican	Brian E. Hefner	2,915	2.36%
Republican	Hal James Styles Jr.	2,082	1.68%
Total votes		123,574	100.00%

Idaho general
Party	Candidate	Votes	%	±%
Republican	Jim Risch	371,744	57.65%	−7.51%
Democratic	Larry LaRocco	219,903	34.11%	+1.56%
Independent	Rex Rammell	34,510	5.35%	
Libertarian	Kent Marmon	9,958	1.54%	−0.75%
Independent	Pro-Life	8,662	1.35%	
Write-ins		3	0.00%	
Majority		151,841	23.55%	−9.06%
Turnout		644,780		
Republican hold		Swing		

On September 1, 2007, senator Larry Craig announced his intent to resign from the Senate effective September 30, 2007. The announcement followed by just six days the disclosure that he had pleaded guilty on August 1, 2007, to a reduced misdemeanor charge arising out of his arrest on June 11 at the Minneapolis airport for soliciting sex with a man in the restroom. Craig found almost no support among Republicans in his home state or Washington. On October 4, 2007, senator Craig announced he would not seek re-election, but would remain in office until the end of his term.

Lieutenant Governor Jim Risch was the Republican candidate; U.S. Army veteran and former congressman Larry LaRocco was the Democratic candidate. Risch and LaRocco ran against each other in the 2006 Lieutenant Governor race, which Risch won by a wide margin. Libertarian Kent Marmon also ran. The last Democratic senator from Idaho was Frank Church, who was defeated in the Republican landslide of 1980 after serving four terms.

Risch won the election with approximately 58% of the vote.

== Illinois ==
Illinois election
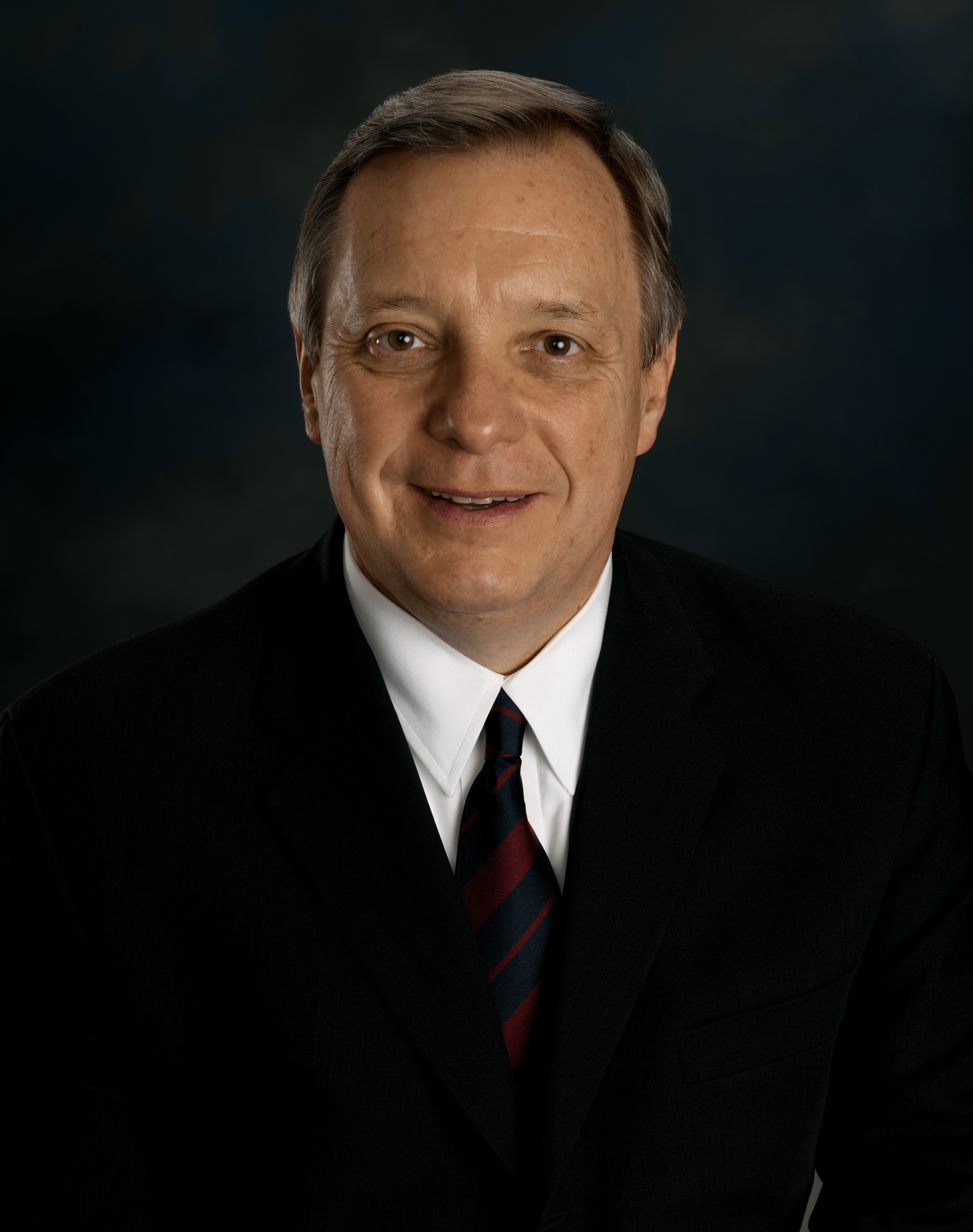

Nominee	Dick Durbin	Steve Sauerberg
Party	Democratic	Republican
Popular vote	3,615,844	1,520,621
Percentage	67.84%	28.53%
- County results Durbin: 40–50% 50–60% 60–70% 70–80% Sauerberg: 40–50% 50–60%
U.S. senator before election
Dick Durbin
Democratic
Elected U.S. senator
Dick Durbin
Democratic

Democratic primary
Party	Candidate	Votes	%
Democratic	Dick Durbin (Incumbent)	1,653,833	100.00%
Total votes		1,653,833	100.00%

Republican primary
Party	Candidate	Votes	%
Republican	Steve Sauerberg	395,199	55.62%
Republican	Andy Martin	240,548	33.85%
Republican	Mike Psak	74,829	10.53%
Total votes		710,576	100.00%

Illinois general
Party	Candidate	Votes	%	±%
Democratic	Dick Durbin (Incumbent)	3,615,844	67.84%	+7.51%
Republican	Steve Sauerberg	1,520,621	28.53%	−9.49%
Green	Kathy Cummings	119,135	2.24%	0.00%
Libertarian	Larry A. Stafford	50,224	0.94%	−0.70%
Constitution	Chad N. Koppie	24,059	0.45%	0.00%
Majority		2,095,223	39.31%	+17.00%
Turnout		5,329,884		
Democratic hold		Swing		

Senate Majority Whip Richard Durbin remained favored in Illinois. He sought to be re-elected in a state that has steadily become more Democratic since 1992. CQpolitics.com rated the contest as "safe Democrat".

Physician Steve Sauerberg of La Grange won the February 5 Republican primary. Kathy Cummings, a retired special education teacher was nominated via convention by the Green Party. Chad Koppie, a retired airline pilot and vice-chairman of the Illinois Center Right Coalition, was the nominee of the Constitution Party.

Durbin won with 68% of the vote. Sauerberg had 29%.

== Iowa ==
Iowa election
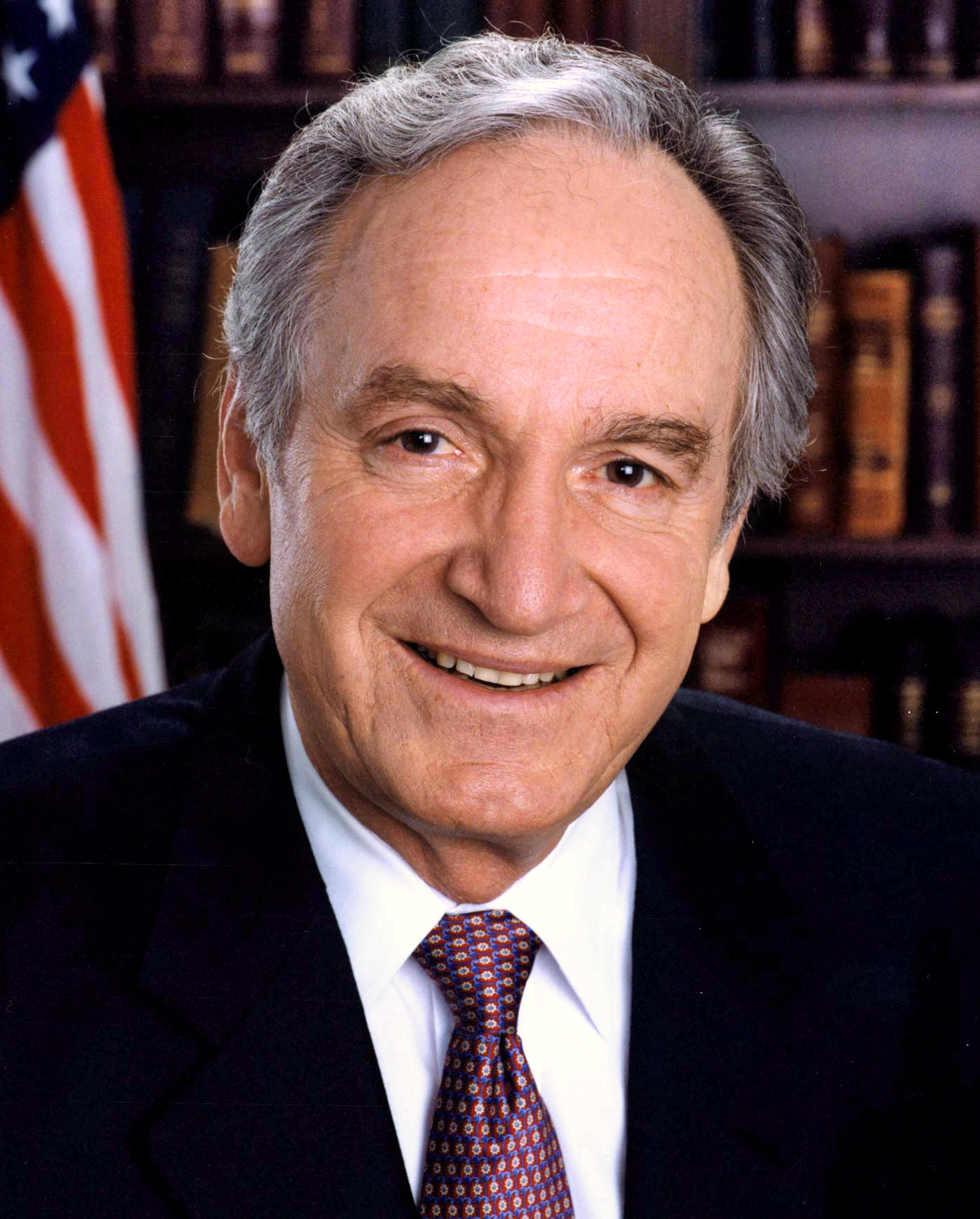

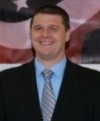
Nominee	Tom Harkin	Christopher Reed
Party	Democratic	Republican
Popular vote	941,665	560,006
Percentage	62.66%	37.26%
- County results Harkin: 50–60% 60–70% 70–80% Reed: 50–60% 60–70% 70–80%
U.S. senator before election
Tom Harkin
Democratic
Elected U.S. senator
Tom Harkin
Democratic

Democratic primary
Party	Candidate	Votes	%
Democratic	Tom Harkin (Incumbent)	90,785	98.83%
Democratic	Write-ins	1,074	1.17%
Total votes		91,859	100.00%

Republican primary
Party	Candidate	Votes	%
Republican	Christopher Reed	24,964	35.32%
Republican	George Eichhorn	24,390	34.52%
Republican	Steve Rathje	21,062	29.80%
Republican	Write-ins	256	0.36%
Total votes		70,672	100.00%

Iowa general
Party	Candidate	Votes	%	±%
Democratic	Tom Harkin (Incumbent)	941,665	62.66%	+8.48%
Republican	Christopher Reed	560,006	37.26%	−6.52%
Write-ins		1,247	0.08%	
Majority		381,659	25.39%	+15.00%
Turnout		1,502,918		
Democratic hold		Swing		

In a state that had been trending to the Democratic party recently, senator Tom Harkin faced the Republican nominee, small business owner Christopher Reed, whom he defeated with 63% of the vote to Reed's 37%.

== Kansas ==
Kansas election
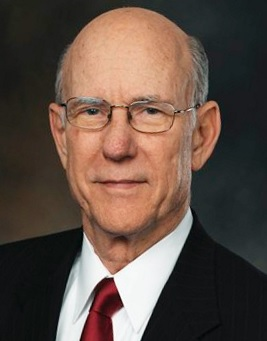

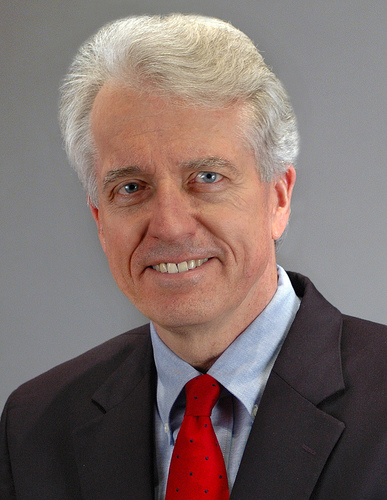
Nominee	Pat Roberts	Jim Slattery
Party	Republican	Democratic
Popular vote	712,396	429,691
Percentage	60.1%	36.5%
- County results Roberts: 40–50% 50–60% 60–70% 70–80% 80–90% >90% Slattery: 40–50% 50–60% 60–70%
U.S. senator before election
Pat Roberts
Republican
Elected U.S. senator
Pat Roberts
Republican

Republican Party primary
Party	Candidate	Votes	%
Republican	Pat Roberts (Incumbent)	214,911	100.00%
Total votes		214,911	100.00%

Democratic primary
Party	Candidate	Votes	%
Democratic	Jim Slattery	68,106	68.93%
Democratic	Lee Jones	30,699	31.07%
Total votes		98,805	100.00%

Kansas general
Party	Candidate	Votes	%	±%
Republican	Pat Roberts (Incumbent)	727,121	60.06%	−22.46%
Democratic	Jim Slattery	441,399	36.46%	
Libertarian	Randall Hodgkinson	25,727	2.12%	−6.98%
Reform	Joseph L. Martin	16,443	1.36%	−7.02%
Majority		285,722	23.60%	−49.82%
Turnout		1,210,690		
Republican hold		Swing		

Senator Pat Roberts sought re-election to a third term. Although Kansas has not elected a Democrat to the Senate since 1932, former Democratic Congressman and army veteran Jim Slattery was nominated to run against Roberts. Pat Roberts held an approval rating of 56%.

Roberts was re-elected with 60% to Slattery's 36%.

== Kentucky ==
Kentucky election
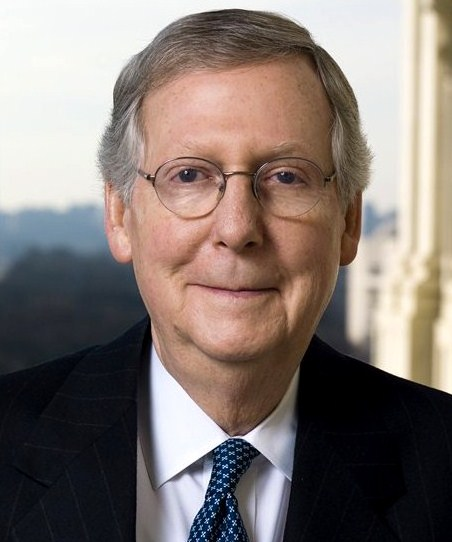

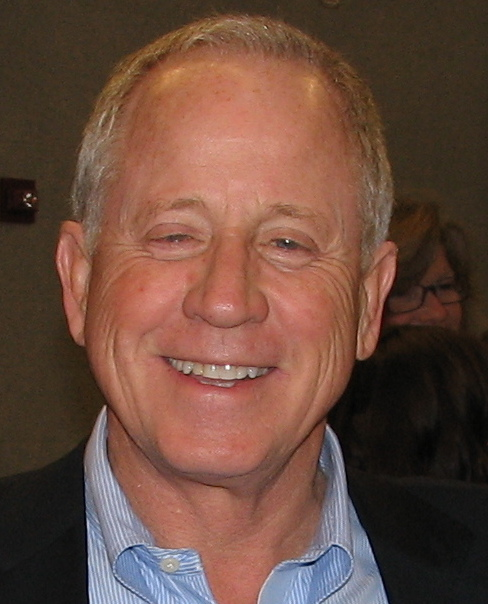
Nominee	Mitch McConnell	Bruce Lunsford
Party	Republican	Democratic
Popular vote	953,816	847,005
Percentage	53.0%	47.0%
- County results McConnell: 50–60% 60–70% 70–80% Lunsford: 50–60% 60–70% 70–80%
U.S. senator before election
Mitch McConnell
Republican
Elected U.S. senator
Mitch McConnell
Republican

Republican primary
Party	Candidate	Votes	%
Republican	Mitch McConnell (incumbent)	168,127	86.09%
Republican	Daniel Essek	27,170	13.91%
Total votes		195,297	100.00%

Democratic primary
Party	Candidate	Votes	%
Democratic	Bruce Lunsford	316,992	51.15%
Democratic	Greg Fischer	209,827	33.85%
Democratic	David L. Williams	34,363	5.54%
Democratic	Michael Cassaro	17,340	2.80%
Democratic	Kenneth Stepp	13,451	2.17%
Democratic	David Wylie	7,528	1.21%
Democratic	James E. Rice	2,365	3.28%
Total votes		619,904	100.00%

Kentucky general
Party	Candidate	Votes	%	±%
Republican	Mitch McConnell (incumbent)	953,816	52.97%	−11.7%
Democratic	Bruce Lunsford	847,005	47.03%	+11.7%
Turnout		1,800,821	62.00%	+19.2%
Republican hold		Swing		

Democrats made Senate Minority Leader, four-term senator Mitch McConnell of Kentucky a target due to his leadership of Senate Republicans and his ties to President Bush, as well as his mediocre approval rating in the state, which was below 50%.

Businessman and U.S. Army veteran Bruce Lunsford, who lost the 2007 Democratic gubernatorial primary to Governor Steve Beshear, was the Democratic nominee.

Once thought to be secure in his re-election, McConnell's lead had shrunk dramatically thanks to the financial crisis and polling showed the race tightening between him and Lunsford. Nevertheless, McConnell was re-elected by a margin of 53% to 47%.

== Louisiana ==
Louisiana election
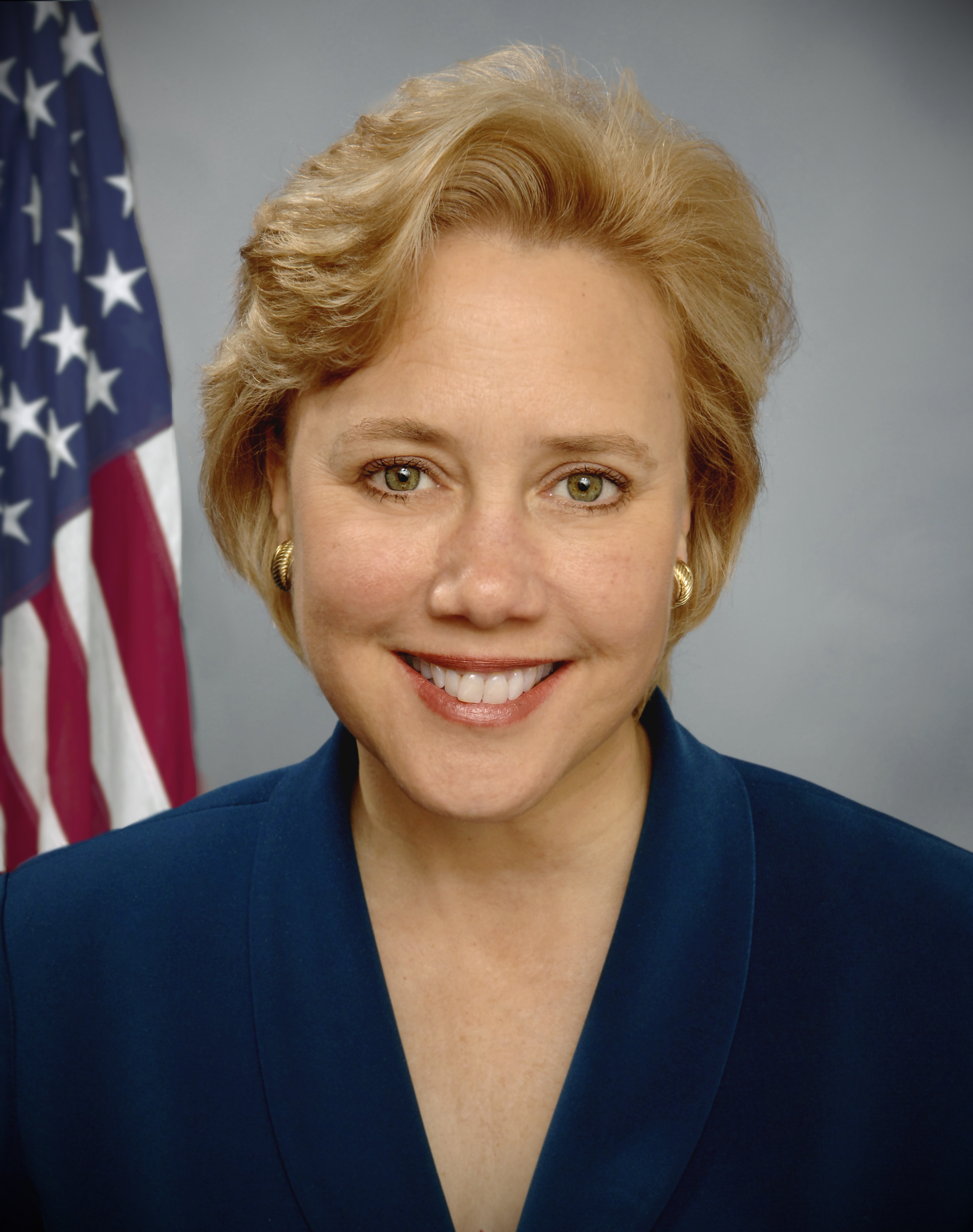

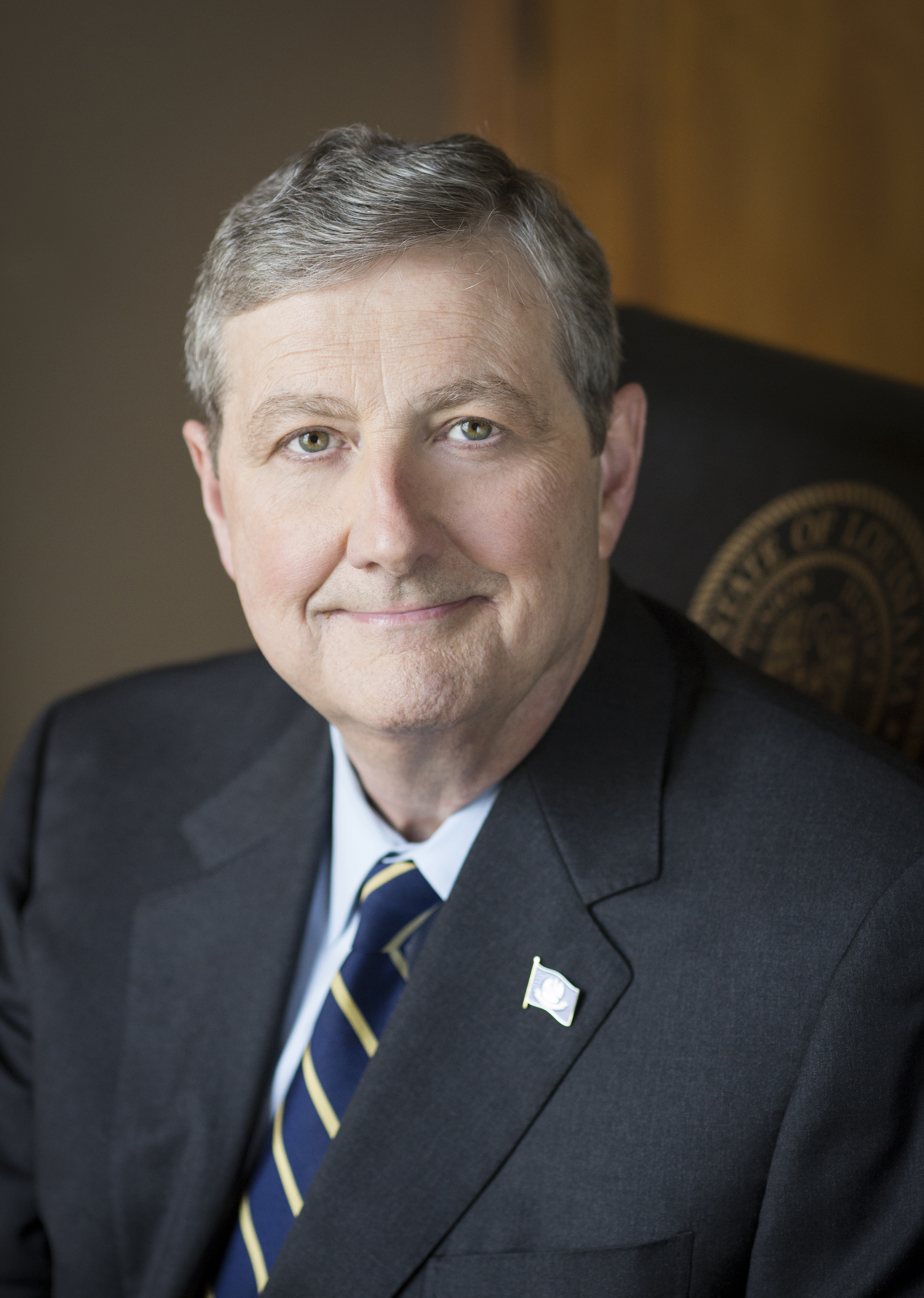
Nominee	Mary Landrieu	John Neely Kennedy
Party	Democratic	Republican
Popular vote	988,298	867,177
Percentage	52.1%	45.7%
- Landrieu: 40-50% 50–60% 60–70% 80–90% Kennedy: 40–50% 50–60% 60–70% 70–80%
U.S. senator before election
Mary Landrieu
Democratic
Elected U.S. senator
Mary Landrieu
Democratic

General election results
Party	Candidate	Votes	%	±%
Democratic	Mary Landrieu (Incumbent)	988,298	52.11%	+0.41%
Republican	John Neely Kennedy	867,177	45.72%	−2.58%
Libertarian	Richard Fontanesi	18,590	0.98%	n/a
Independent	Jay Patel	13,729	0.72%	n/a
Independent	Robert Stewart	8,780	0.46%	n/a
Majority		121,121	6.39%	+2.99%
Turnout		1,896,574	100.0%	
Democratic hold		Swing		

Incumbent Mary Landrieu was elected in 1996 following a recount and was narrowly re-elected in 2002 in a runoff election. Since those elections, Democrats have had to endure the loss of some reliable voters because Hurricane Katrina dispersed many African-Americans from New Orleans, although the vast majority still live within Louisiana. The state had become more Republican over the past 12 years. Louisiana elected David Vitter in 2004, the state's first Republican senator since Reconstruction, as well as Republican Bobby Jindal as the first Indian-American Governor in the country's history in 2007. Louisiana's electoral votes easily went to George W. Bush in 2000 and 2004.

On August 27, 2007, state Treasurer John Neely Kennedy announced he was switching parties from Democrat to Republican. On November 29, after being personally recruited by Vitter and former Bush administration official Karl Rove, Kennedy announced plans to challenge Landrieu in 2008.

In the end, Landrieu was re-elected with 52% of the vote, Kennedy having 46%.

== Maine ==
Maine election
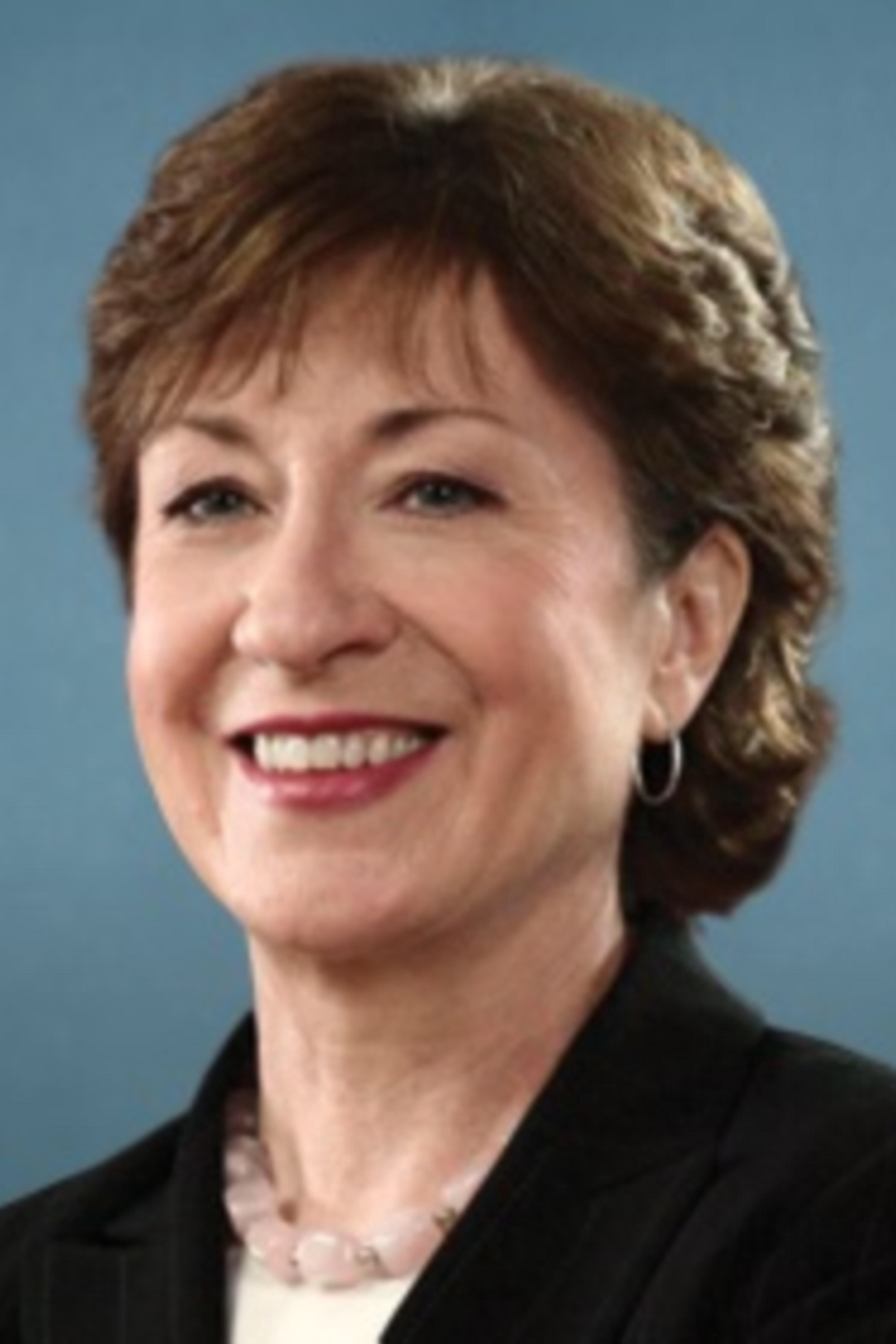

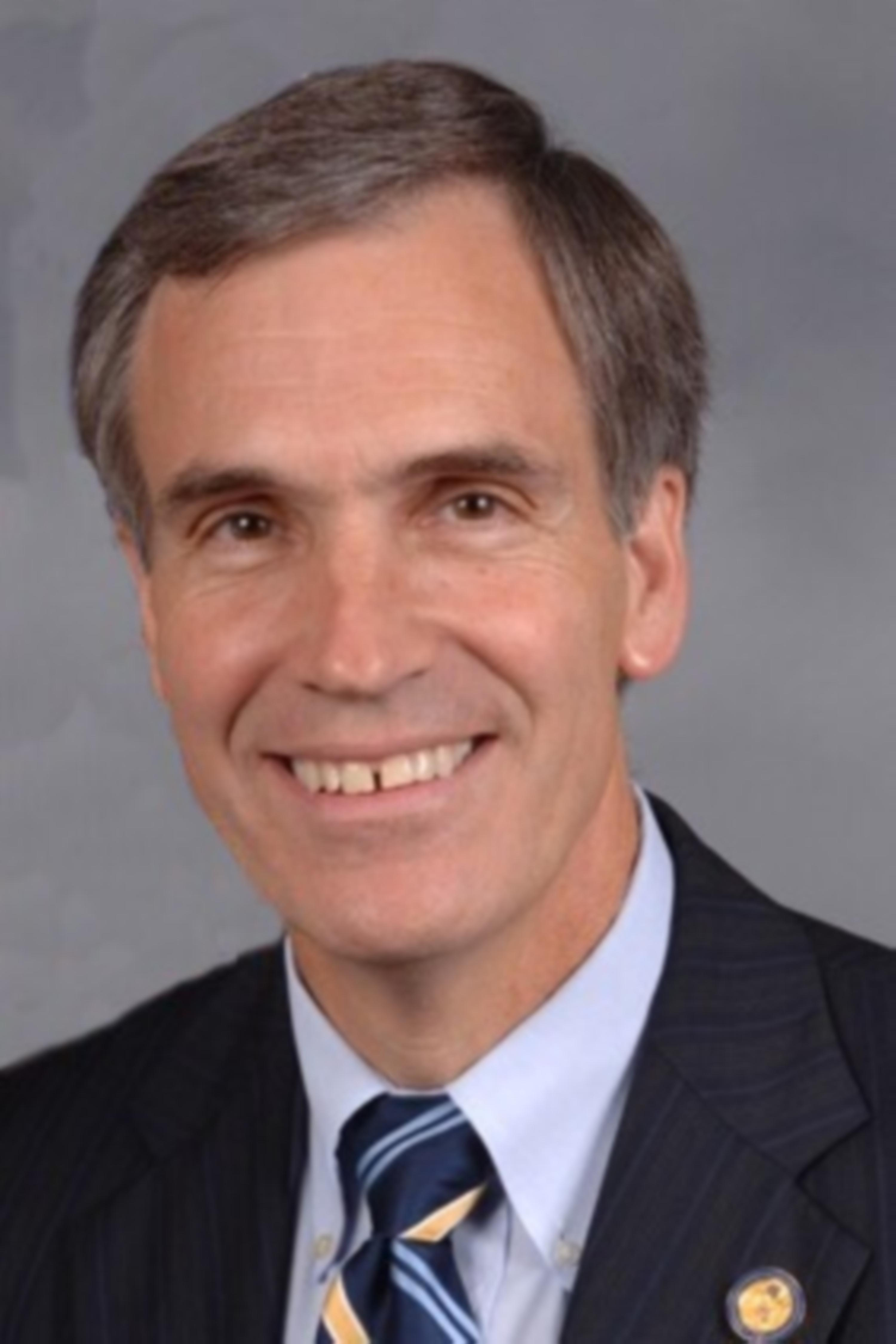
Nominee	Susan Collins	Tom Allen
Party	Republican	Democratic
Popular vote	444,300	279,510
Percentage	61.3%	38.6%
- Collins: 50–60% 60–70% 70–80% 80–90% >90% Allen: 50–60% 60–70%
U.S. senator before election
Susan Collins
Republican
Elected U.S. senator
Susan Collins
Republican

2008 Maine U.S. Senate Democratic primary
Party	Candidate	Votes	%	±%
Democratic	Tom Allen	69,932	85.6%	
Democratic	Tom Ledue	11,795	14.4%	
Turnout		81,727		

General election results
Party	Candidate	Votes	%	±%
Republican	Susan Collins (incumbent)	444,300	61.33%	+2.9%
Democratic	Tom Allen	279,510	38.58%	−3.0%
	write-ins	620	0.09%	n/a
Majority		164,790		
Turnout		724,430		
Republican hold		Swing		

In Maine, Susan Collins sought a third term in the Senate. She had maintained a high approval rating, and also in her favor was the landslide re-election of Maine's senior Senator, Olympia Snowe, who had the largest margin of victory of any GOP Senate candidate - besides the largely unopposed Richard Lugar (R-IN) - in the 2006 election cycle. Collins was re-elected with 58% of the vote in 2002 over State Sen. Chellie Pingree. Fellow senator Joe Lieberman, citing his status as an independent, endorsed Collins in her 2008 re-election bid.

On May 8, 2007, Rep. Tom Allen (ME-1) announced his candidacy on his website. He had already expressed interest in running and had been building the apparatus necessary to wage a Senate campaign.

Collins won on election day with 61% of the vote, compared to 39% for Allen.

== Massachusetts ==
Massachusetts election
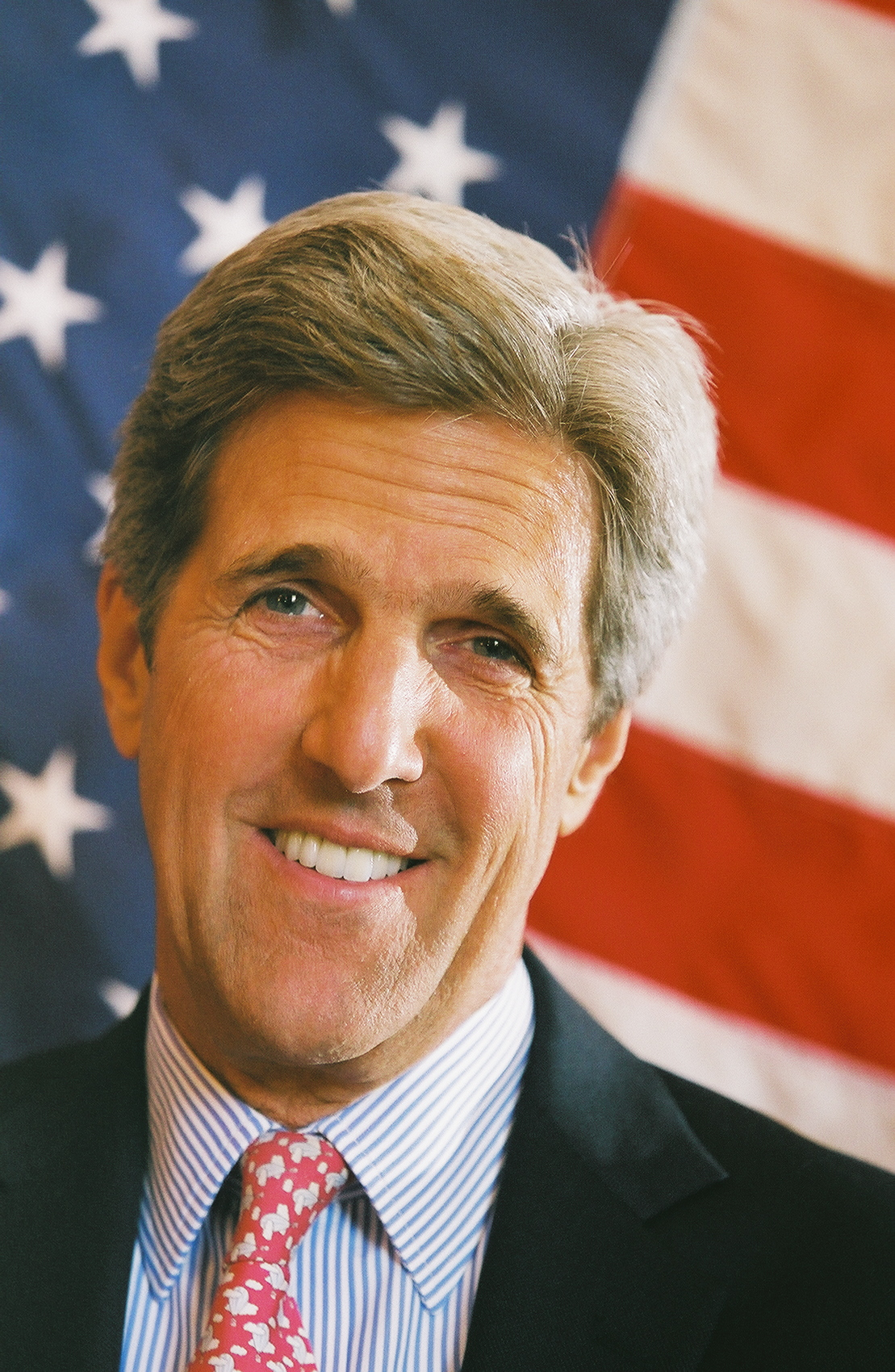

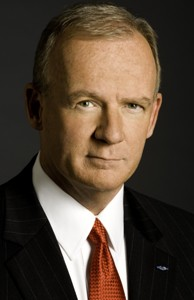
Nominee	John Kerry	Jeff Beatty
Party	Democratic	Republican
Popular vote	1,959,843	922,727
Percentage	65.8%	31.0%

Kerry
40–50%
50–60%
60–70%
70–80%
80–90%
Beatty
40–50%
U.S. senator before election
John Kerry
Democratic
Elected U.S. senator
John Kerry
Democratic

Democratic primary in Massachusetts
Party	Candidate	Votes	%	±%
Democratic	John Kerry (incumbent)	335,923	68.92%	
Democratic	Edward O'Reilly	151,473	31.08%	
Turnout		487,396		

General election results
Party	Candidate	Votes	%	±%
Democratic	John Kerry (Incumbent)	1,959,843	65.82%	−14.2%
Republican	Jeff Beatty	922,727	30.99%	+30.99%
Libertarian	Robert J. Underwood	94,727	3.18%	−15.1%
Majority		1,037,116		
Turnout		2,977,631		
Democratic hold		Swing		

Incumbent John Kerry sought another Senate term in Massachusetts. Republican author and conservative activist Jerome Corsi, known for his public criticism of Kerry, had stated that he would run for the seat in 2008 but later changed his mind. Jim Ogonowski, a retired Air Force pilot who was closely defeated by now-Representative Niki Tsongas in a 2007 special election, was running against Kerry but failed to obtain the required candidacy signatures. The Republican challenger turned out to be Jeff Beatty, an ex-Army Delta Force officer who garnered 30% of the vote in a challenge to Democratic Congressman Bill Delahunt in 2006. Kerry was challenged by defense attorney Edward O'Reilly for the Democratic nomination, winning 69% of the vote to O'Reilly's 31%.

Kerry won with 66% of the vote to Beatty's 31%. Libertarian Robert J. Underwood had 3%.

== Michigan ==
Michigan election
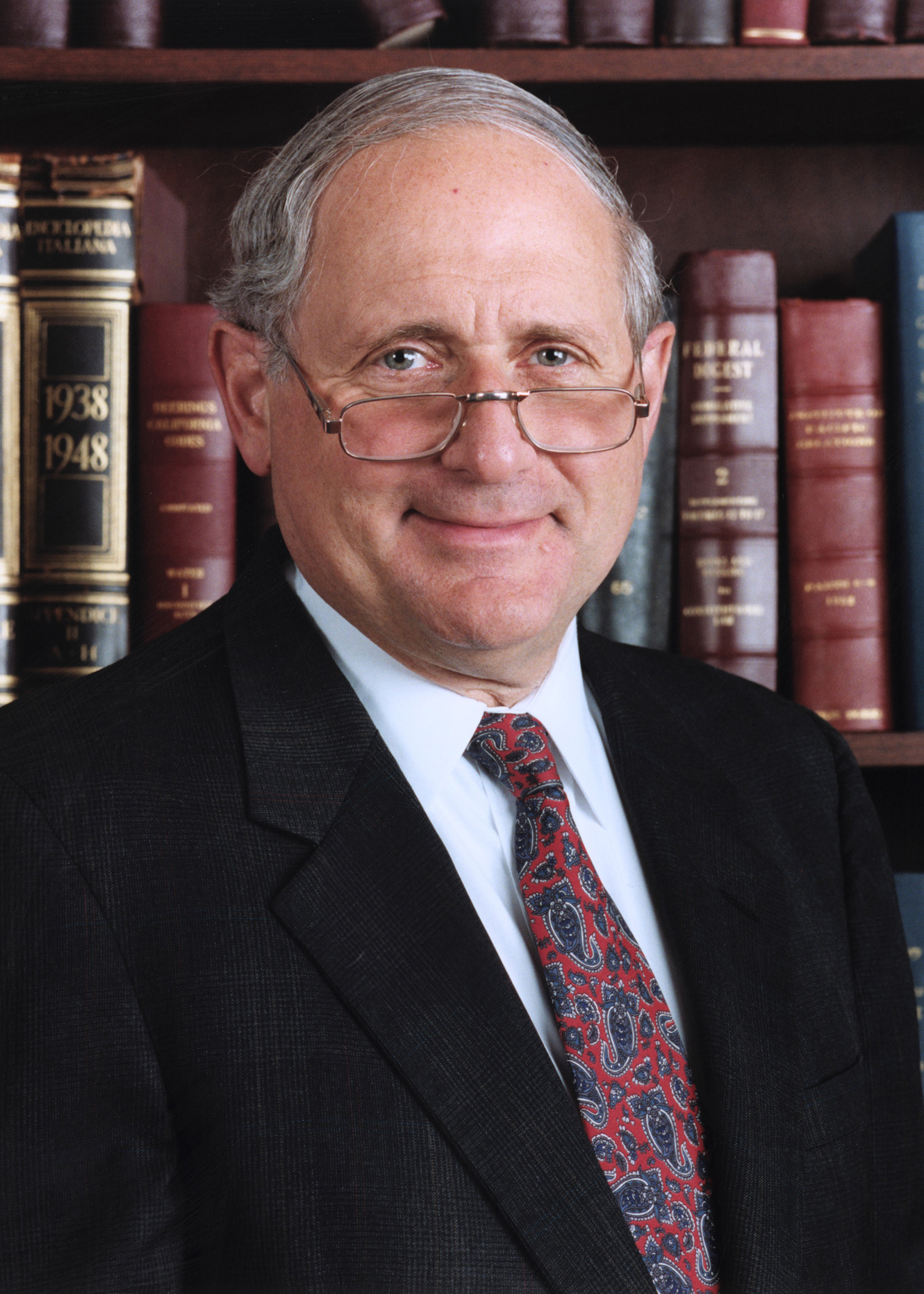

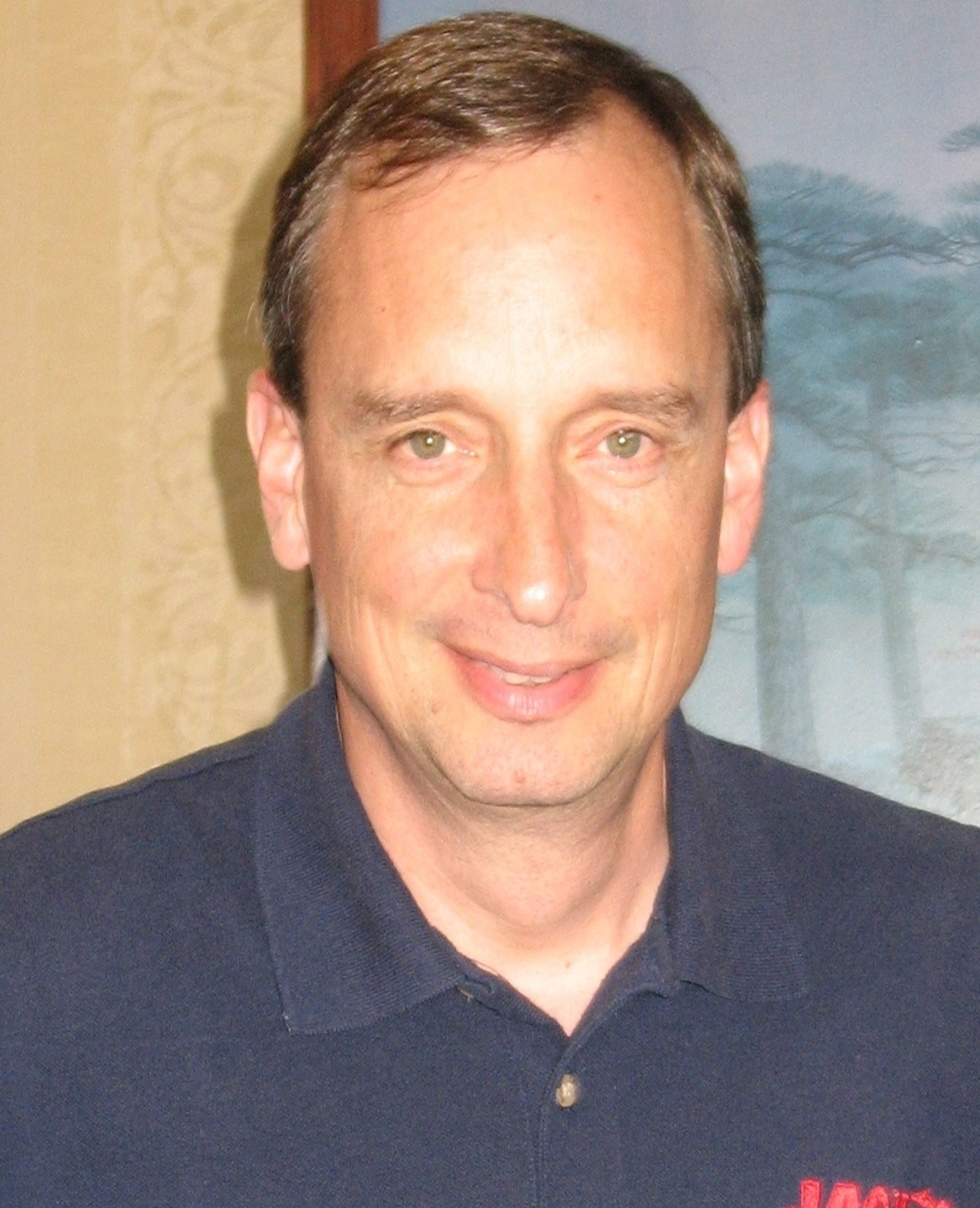
Nominee	Carl Levin	Jack Hoogendyk
Party	Democratic	Republican
Popular vote	3,038,386	1,641,070
Percentage	62.7%	33.8%
- Levin: 40–50% 50–60% 60–70% 70–80% Hoogendyk: 40–50% 50–60%
U.S. senator before election
Carl Levin
Democratic
Elected U.S. senator
Carl Levin
Democratic

Michigan general
Party	Candidate	Votes	%	±%
Democratic	Carl Levin (Incumbent)	3,038,386	62.7%	+2.1%
Republican	Jack Hoogendyk	1,641,070	33.8%	−4.1%
Libertarian	Scotty Boman	76,347	1.6%	n/a
Green	Harley Mikkelson	43,440	0.9%	+0.1%
U.S. Taxpayers	Michael Nikitin	30,827	0.6%	n/a
Natural Law	Doug Dern	18,550	0.4%	+0.1%
Majority		1,397,316		
Turnout		4,848,620		
Democratic hold		Swing		

With the Democratic Party takeover of Capitol Hill in the 2006 midterm elections, senator Carl Levin had become one of the most powerful people in Washington as chairman of the Senate Armed Services Committee.

Challenging Levin were Republican State Representative Jack Hoogendyk, Green candidate Harley G. Mikkelson, U.S. Taxpayers candidate Mike Nikitin, Libertarian professor Scotty Boman, and Natural Law's candidate Doug Dern.

Levin won re-election with 63% of the vote, to Hoogendyk's 34%.

== Minnesota ==
Minnesota election

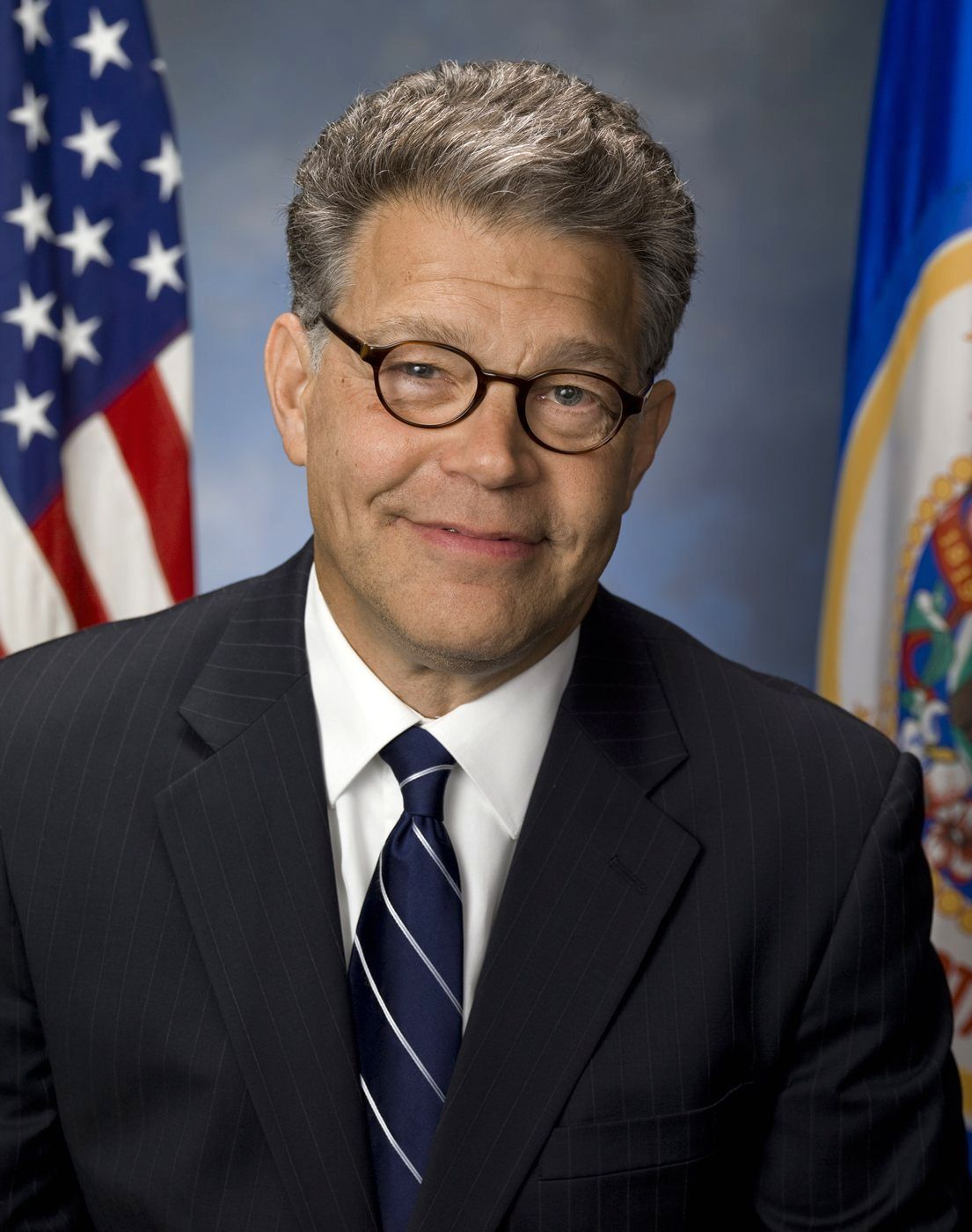

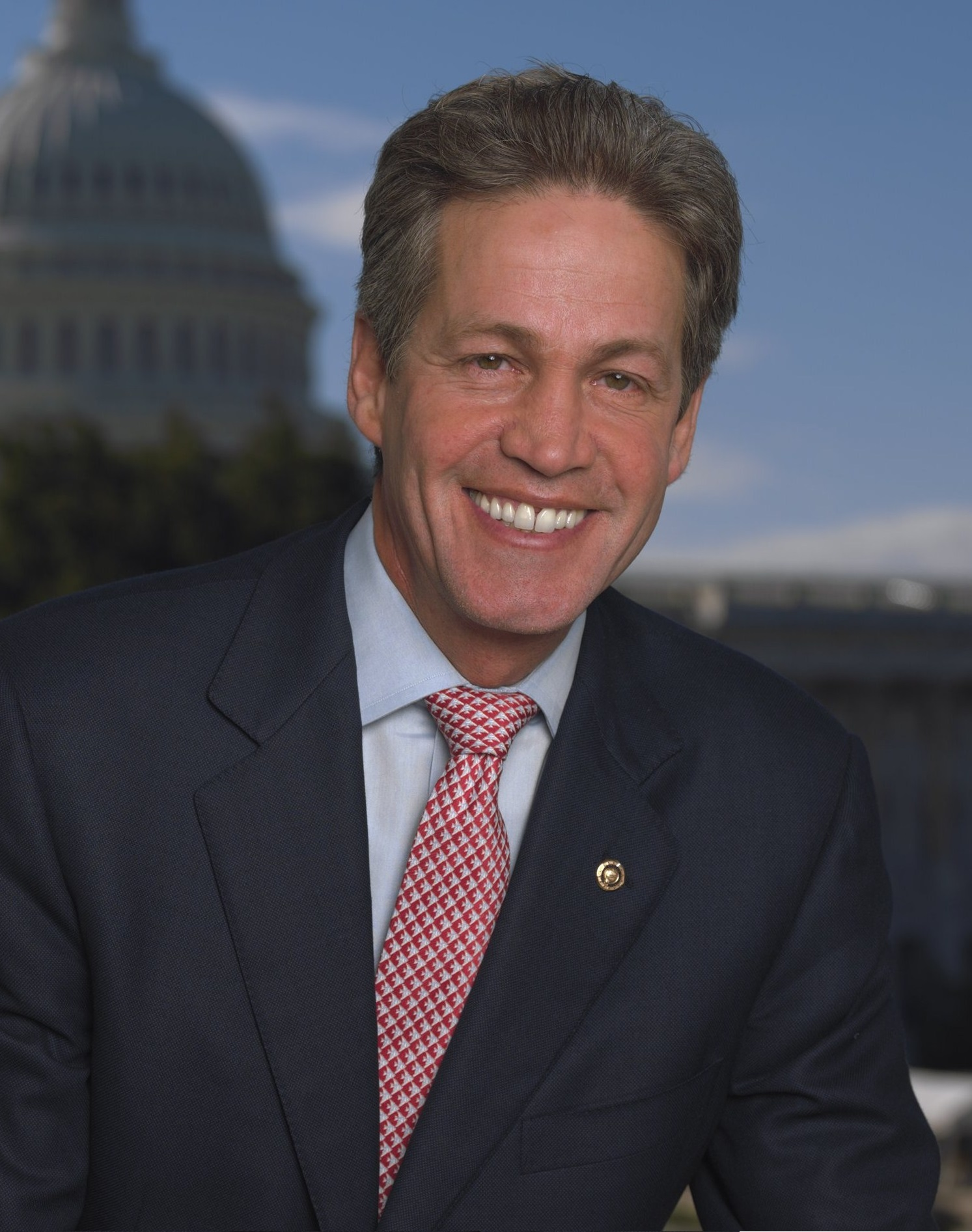

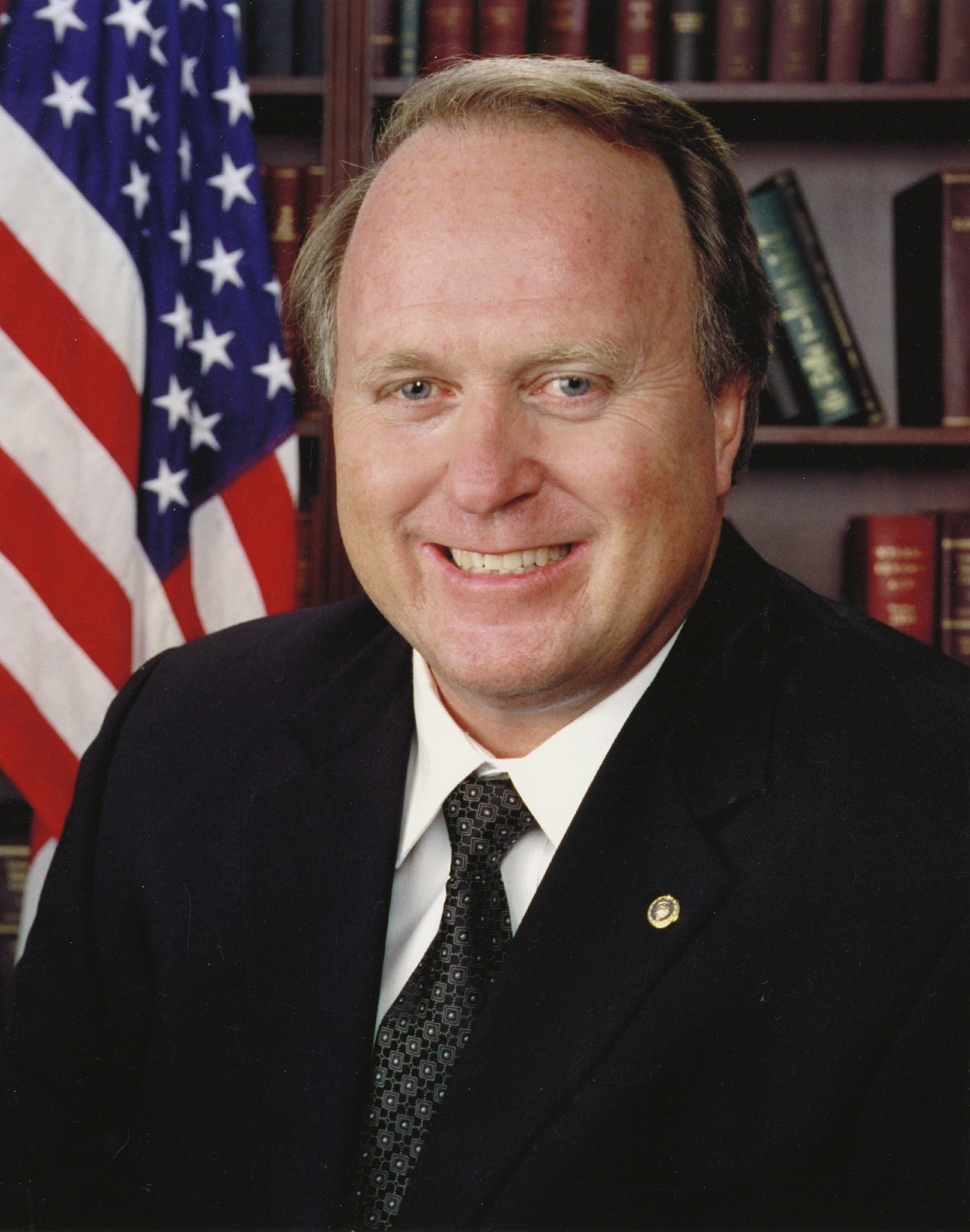
Nominee	Al Franken	Norm Coleman	Dean Barkley
Party	Democratic (DFL)	Republican	Independence
Popular vote	1,212,629	1,212,317	437,505
Percentage	41.99%	41.98%	15.15%
- Franken: 40–50% 50–60% Coleman: 40–50% 50–60%
U.S. senator before election
Norm Coleman
Republican
Elected U.S. senator
Al Franken
Democratic (DFL)

Democratic–Farmer–Labor primary
Party	Candidate	Votes	%
Democratic (DFL)	Al Franken	164,136	65.34%
Democratic (DFL)	Priscilla Lord Faris	74,655	29.72%
Democratic (DFL)	Dick Franson	3,923	1.56%
Democratic (DFL)	Bob Larson	3,152	1.25%
Democratic (DFL)	Rob Fitzgerald	3,095	1.23%
Democratic (DFL)	Ole Savior	1,227	0.49%
Democratic (DFL)	Alve Erickson	1,017	0.40%
Turnout		251,205	

Independence primary
Party	Candidate	Votes	%
Independence	Dean Barkley	6,678	58.88%
Independence	Jack Uldrich	1,405	12.39%
Independence	Stephen Williams	800	7.05%
Independence	Kurt Michael Anderson	761	6.71%
Independence	Doug Williams	639	5.63%
Independence	Darryl Stanton	618	5.45%
Independence	Bill Dahn	440	3.88%
Turnout		11,341	

Republican primary
Party	Candidate	Votes	%
Republican	Norm Coleman (Incumbent)	130,973	91.32%
Republican	Jack Shepard	12,456	8.68%
Turnout		143,429	

2007 year-end reports filed with the Federal Election Commission showed that Al Franken had raised $7.04 million through December 31, 2007, while Norm Coleman had raised $6.24 million. Year-end cash on hand was $6.04 million for Coleman and $3.10 million for Franken.

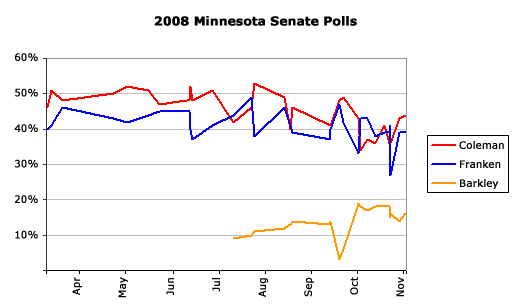

General election (Results certified November 18)
Party	Candidate	Votes	%
Republican	Norm Coleman (Incumbent)	1,211,590	41.988%
Democratic (DFL)	Al Franken	1,211,375	41.981%
Independence	Dean Barkley	437,404	15.19%
Libertarian	Charles Aldrich	13,916	0.48%
Constitution	James Niemackl	8,905	0.31%
Write-ins		2,365	0.08%
Plurality		215	0.007%
Turnout		2,885,555	

Note: The ±% column reflects the change in total number of votes won by each party from the previous election. Additionally, votes cast for Paul Wellstone in the 2002 election are not factored into the DFL's total from that year.

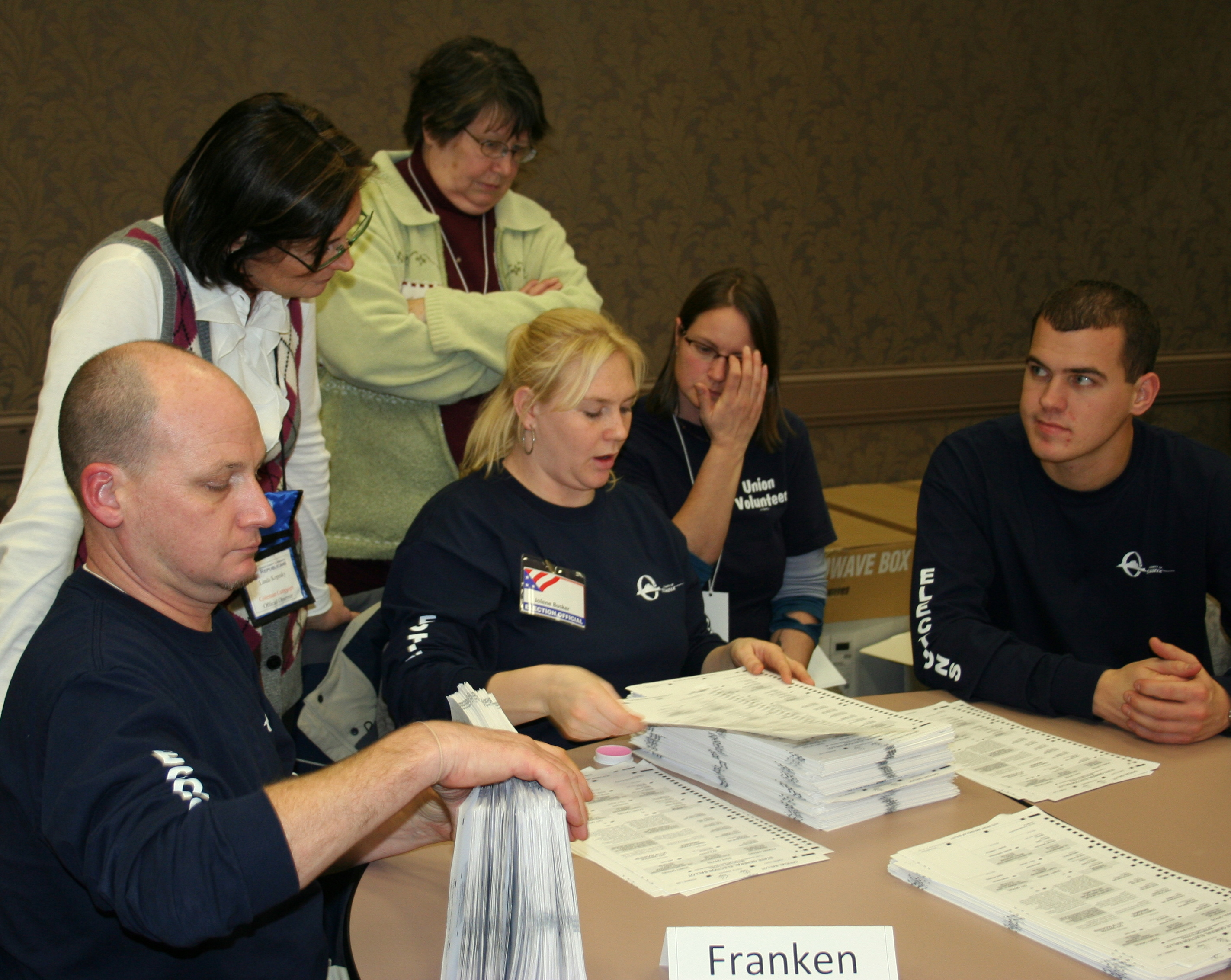
Recounting ballots by hand in Olmsted County.

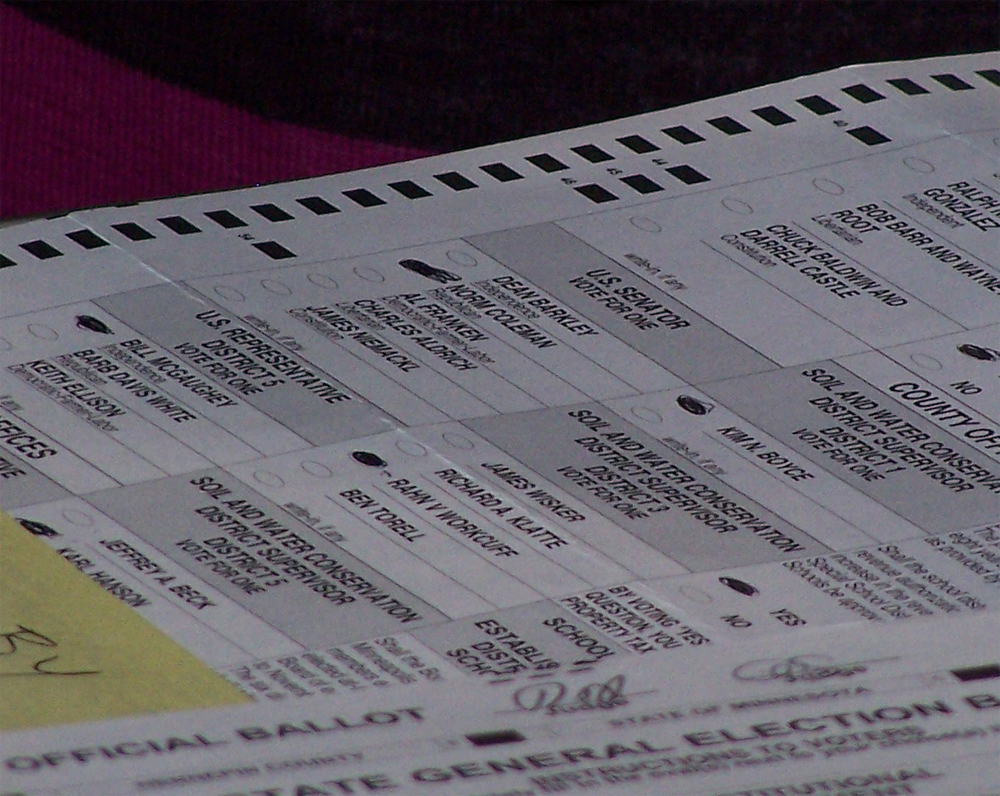
Hennepin County ballot paper.

General election (Results certified January 5, 2009)
Party	Candidate	Votes	%
Democratic (DFL)	Al Franken	1,212,431	41.991%
Republican	Norm Coleman (Incumbent)	1,212,206	41.984%
Independence	Dean Barkley	437,505	15.15%
Libertarian	Charles Aldrich	13,923	0.48%
Constitution	James Niemackl	8,907	0.31%
Write-ins		2,365	0.08%
Plurality		225	0.007%
Turnout		2,887,337	

General election (Results certified after election contest)
Party	Candidate	Votes	%
Democratic (DFL)	Al Franken	1,212,629	41.994%
Republican	Norm Coleman (Incumbent)	1,212,317	41.983%
Independence	Dean Barkley	437,505	15.151%
Libertarian	Charles Aldrich	13,923	0.48%
Constitution	James Niemackl	8,907	0.31%
Write-ins		2,365	0.08%
Plurality		312	0.011%
Turnout		2,887,646	
Democratic (DFL) gain from Republican			

The 2008 U.S. Senate election in Minnesota featured first-term Republican incumbent senator Norm Coleman, Democrat Al Franken, a comedian and radio personality, and former U.S. senator Dean Barkley, a member of the Independence Party of Minnesota.

A December 2007 poll showed Coleman's approval rating among Minnesota voters at 53%. The seat was heavily targeted by the Democratic Senatorial Campaign Committee because of Minnesota's Democratic leanings and recent Democratic gains in national and statewide elections. These factors, coupled with a national political climate favorable to Democrats, made the Minnesota Senate race one of the most competitive and closely watched of the cycle.

Franken announced his candidacy on February 14, 2007, more than 20 months before the election. Jack Nelson-Pallmeyer, a professor at the University of St. Thomas (St. Paul, Minnesota), joined the race in October 2007. Attorney Mike Ciresi, an unsuccessful candidate in the 2000 Democratic U.S. Senate primary, was considered a serious candidate, but withdrew from the race on March 10, 2008, clearing the path for Franken to secure the party's nomination.

Barkley, who had briefly been appointed Senator after the death of Paul Wellstone in 2002, ran under the banner of the Independence Party, the largest third party in Minnesota. He was included in most of the debates and ultimately received 15% of the vote in the general election, a strong showing for a third-party candidate. It is not clear whether Barkley detracted more votes from Coleman or Franken.

Polls over the course of the campaign indicated that the race was very competitive, with many polls showing Franken and Coleman virtually tied or within the margin of error, as well as several polls showing each candidate with a significant lead at one point or another. The presence of a serious third-party candidate further complicated matters.

On November 4, 2008, Coleman received 1,211,590 votes to Franken's 1,211,375 votes, a margin of 215 votes, far less than 0.1%, thereby triggering an automatic recount. Barkley received 437,404 votes, about 15% of total votes cast.

On January 3, 2009, with the recount apparently completed, Franken had an unofficial lead of 225 votes, but former senator Coleman's attorneys contested the official results in the courts. During the recount process, Minnesota was represented by only one senator, Amy Klobuchar.

On April 13, 2009, a three-judge panel ruled that Al Franken received the most votes in Minnesota's 2008 Senate race and ruled against Coleman's claims on all counts. Coleman appealed this decision. On June 30, 2009, the Minnesota Supreme Court ruled unanimously that Al Franken received the most votes, and Norm Coleman conceded defeat after the ruling, allowing Al Franken to be Senator-elect of Minnesota. Franken was sworn in as Minnesota's junior senator on July 7.

== Mississippi ==
=== Mississippi (regular) ===
Mississippi election

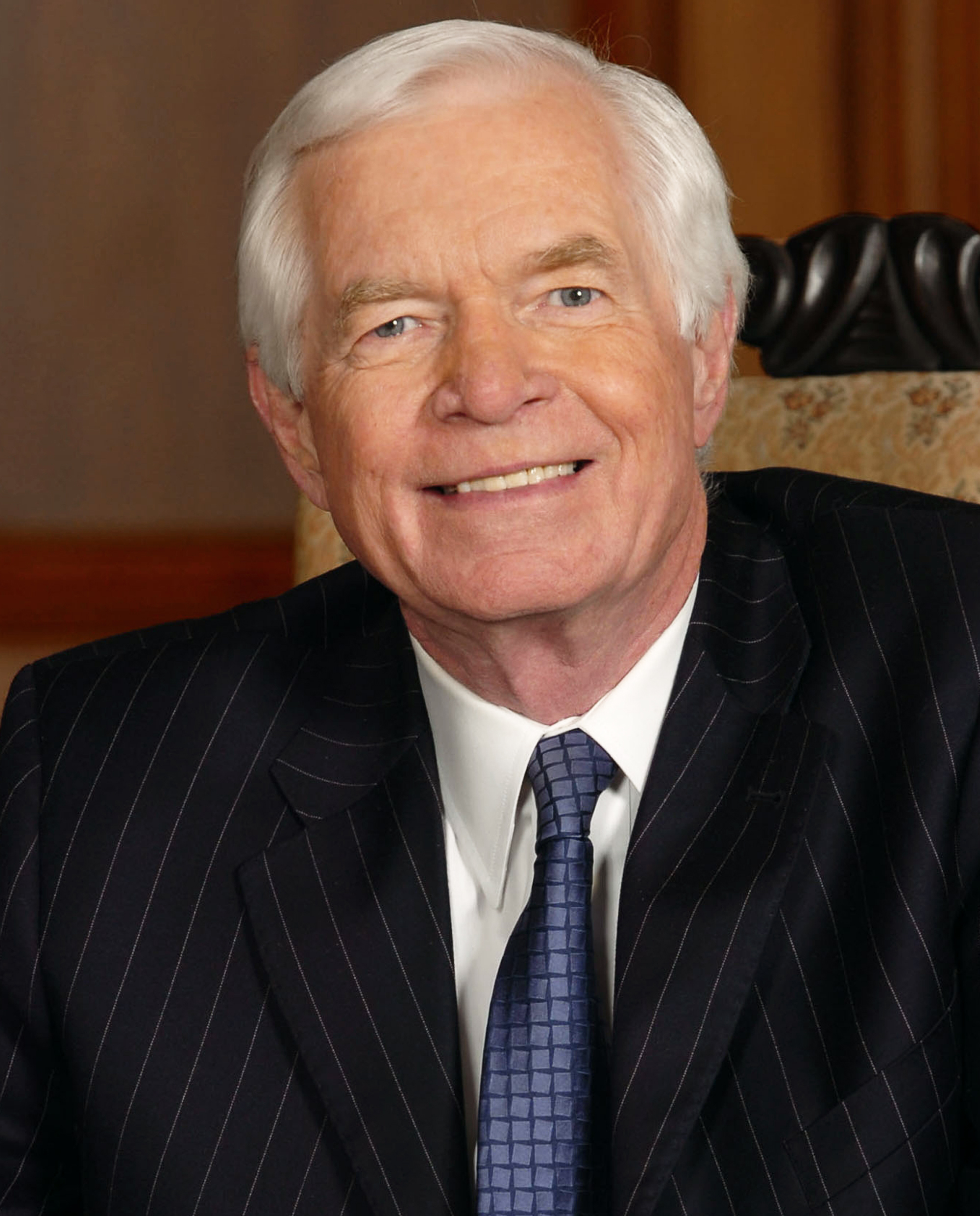

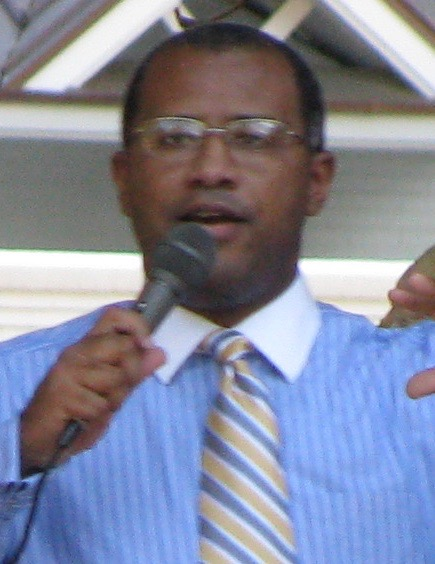
Nominee	Thad Cochran	Erik Fleming
Party	Republican	Democratic
Popular vote	766,111	480,915
Percentage	61.4%	38.6%
- Cochran: 50–60% 60–70% 70–80% 80–90% Fleming: 50–60% 60–70% 70–80% 80–90%
U.S. senator before election
Thad Cochran
Republican
Elected U.S. senator
Thad Cochran
Republican

Incumbent Republican Thad Cochran announced that he would seek re-election for a sixth term. Cochran, who has not faced serious opposition since he was re-elected in 1984, faced Democratic state Representative Erik R. Fleming, whom he defeated with 61% of the vote.

Mississippi general
Party	Candidate	Votes	%	±%
Republican	Thad Cochran (Incumbent)	766,111	61.44%	−23.2%
Democratic	Erik Fleming	480,915	38.56%	n/a
Majority		285,196		
Turnout		1,247,026		
Republican hold		Swing		

=== Mississippi (special) ===
Mississippi special election
- November 4, 2008
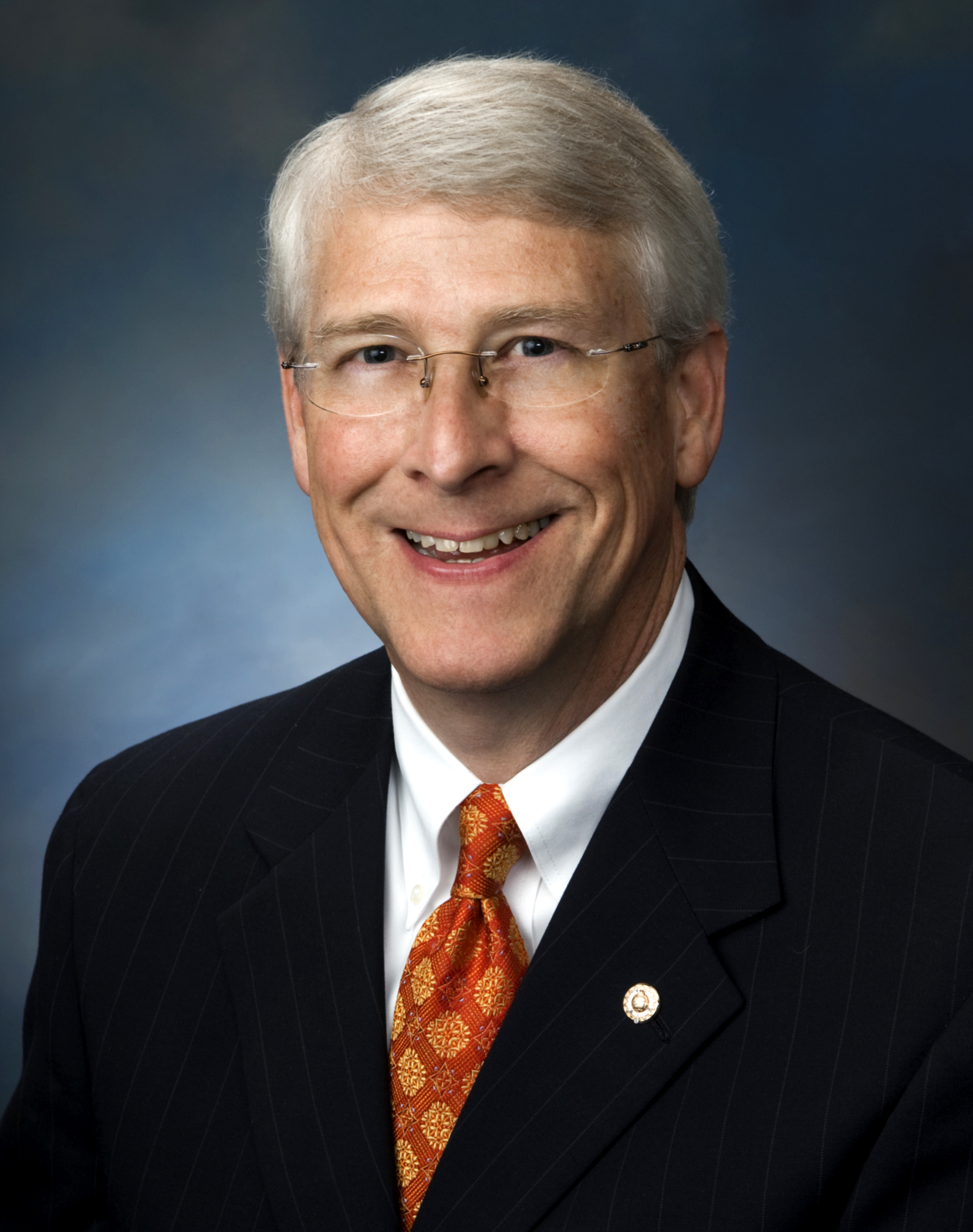

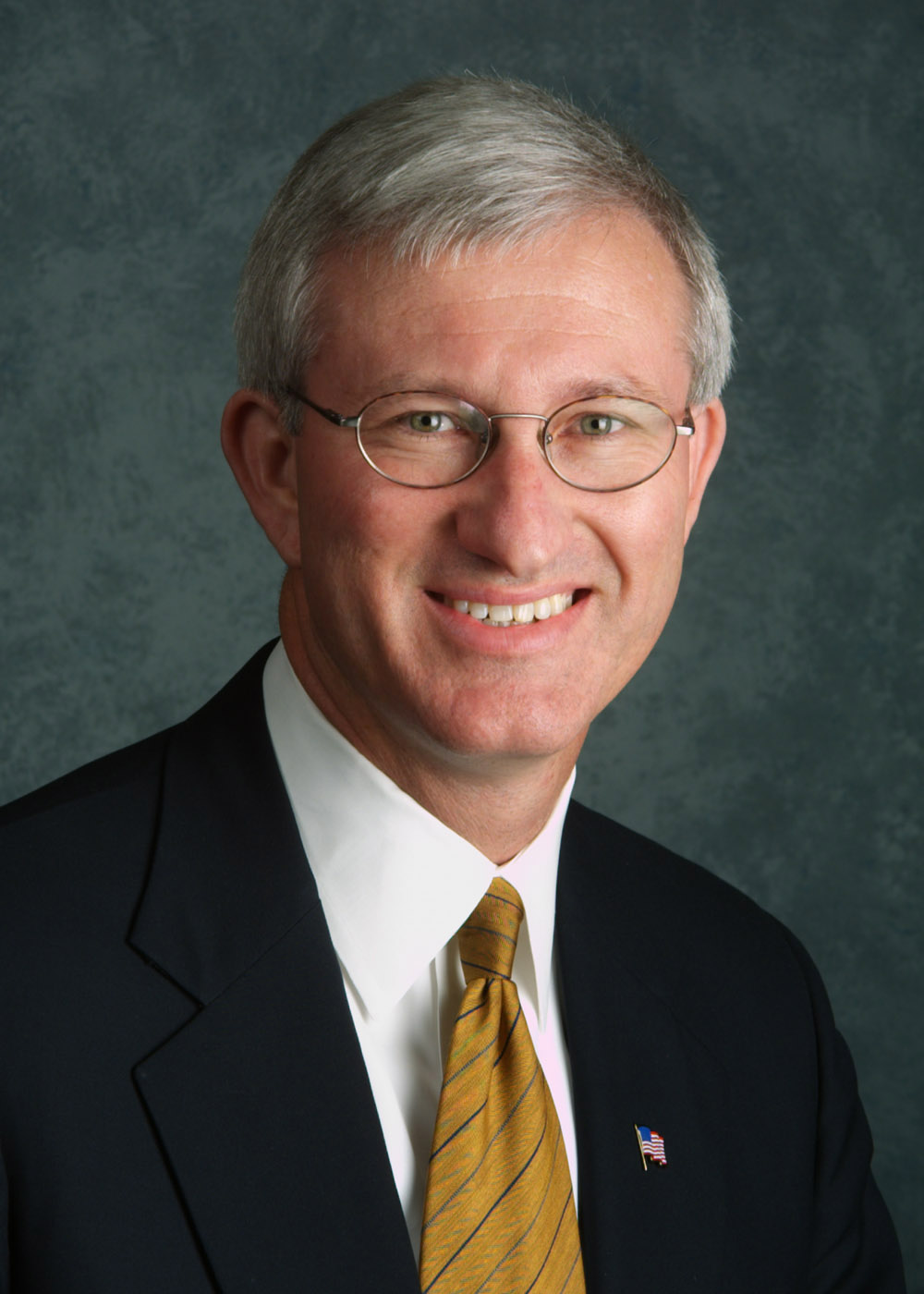
Nominee	Roger Wicker	Ronnie Musgrove
Party	Republican	Democratic
Popular vote	683,409	560,064
Percentage	55.0%	45.0%
- Wicker: 50–60% 60–70% 70–80% Musgrove: 50–60% 60–70% 70–80% 80–90%
U.S. senator before election
Roger Wicker
Republican
Elected U.S. senator
Roger Wicker
Republican

Roger Wicker, formerly the representative of Mississippi's 1st congressional district, was appointed by Governor Haley Barbour on December 31, 2007, to fill the vacancy caused by the December 18 resignation of Trent Lott. It had been speculated that Lott wished to resign before a new lobbying reform law, effective the first day of 2008, took effect; having resigned before the end of 2007, Lott may become a lobbyist in 2009 instead of 2010. Controversy arose when Barbour called for the special election to be held on the same day as the general election. As a result, Mississippi's Attorney General Jim Hood challenged Barbour in court, claiming that the special election needed to be held within 100 days of Lott's resignation, as per state law. Initially, a Mississippi Circuit Court judge sided with Hood, ruling that the election take place on or before March 19, 2008. However, Barbour filed an appeal to the Mississippi Supreme Court, which overturned the earlier ruling and set the special election for November 4, 2008.

Democratic former Governor Ronnie Musgrove challenged Wicker. Another Democrat, former Congressman Ronnie Shows, also filed to run, but he withdrew in February 2008 and endorsed Musgrove. Wicker beat Musgrove 55% to 45%.

2008 Mississippi U.S. Senate special election
Party	Candidate	Votes	%	±%
Republican	Roger Wicker (incumbent)	683,409	54.96%	−8.6%
Democratic	Ronnie Musgrove	560,064	45.04%	+9.9%
Majority		123,345		
Turnout		1,243,473		
Republican hold		Swing		

== Montana ==
Montana election
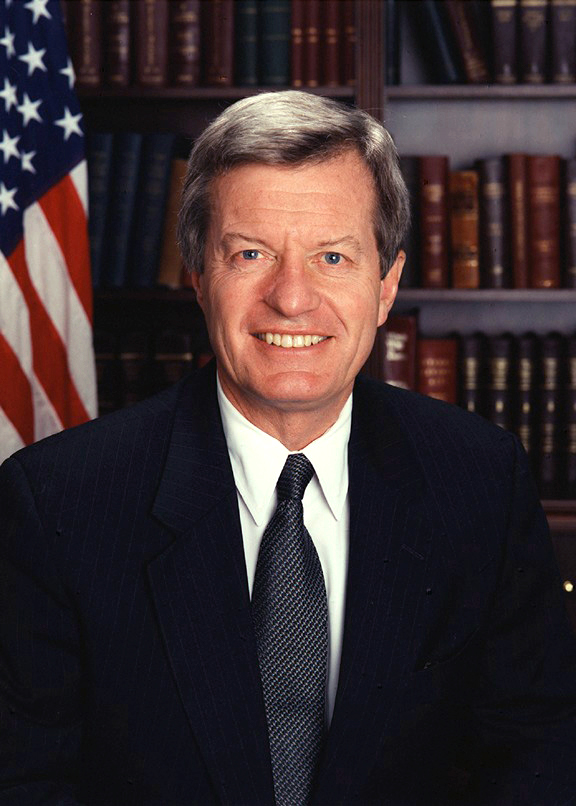

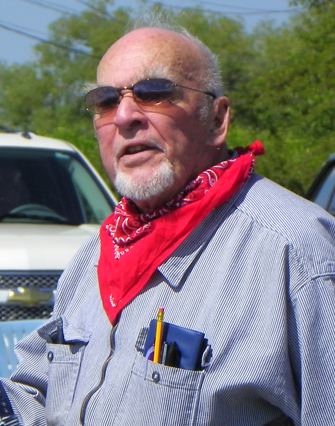
Nominee	Max Baucus	Robert Kelleher
Party	Democratic	Republican
Popular vote	345,937	128,762
Percentage	72.9%	27.1%
- County results Baucus: 50–60% 60–70% 70–80% 80–90%
U.S. senator before election
Max Baucus
Democratic
Elected U.S. senator
Max Baucus
Democratic

Senator Max Baucus was a popular Democrat in Montana, representing a state that has long been fairly Republican but also receptive to Democrats in state and local elections. President Bush won Montana by more than 20 points in both 2000 and 2004, but Montana also had a popular Democratic governor, Brian Schweitzer, and a newly elected Democratic junior senator, Jon Tester. Baucus was not expected to face a significant challenge from the 85-year-old Republican nominee, Bob Kelleher, who surprised observers by winning the June 3 Republican primary despite supporting a number of positions that put him to the political left of Baucus, such as nationalization of the American oil and gas industry.

Baucus easily won re-election, taking 73% of the vote, with Kelleher taking 27%.

Democratic Party primary
Party	Candidate	Votes	%
Democratic	Max Baucus (Incumbent)	165,050	100.00%
Total votes		165,050	100.00%

Republican Party primary
Party	Candidate	Votes	%
Republican	Bob Kelleher	26,936	36.32%
Republican	Michael Lange	17,044	22.98%
Republican	Kirk Bushman	15,507	20.91%
Republican	Patty Lovaas	7,632	10.29%
Republican	Anton Pearson	4,257	5.74%
Republican	Shay Joshua Garnett	2,788	3.76%
Total votes		74,164	100.00%

Montana general
Party	Candidate	Votes	%	±%
Democratic	Max Baucus (incumbent)	348,289	72.92%	+10.18%
Republican	Bob Kelleher	129,369	27.08%	−4.65%
Majority		218,920	45.84%	+14.84%
Turnout		477,658		
Democratic hold		Swing		

== Nebraska ==
Nebraska election
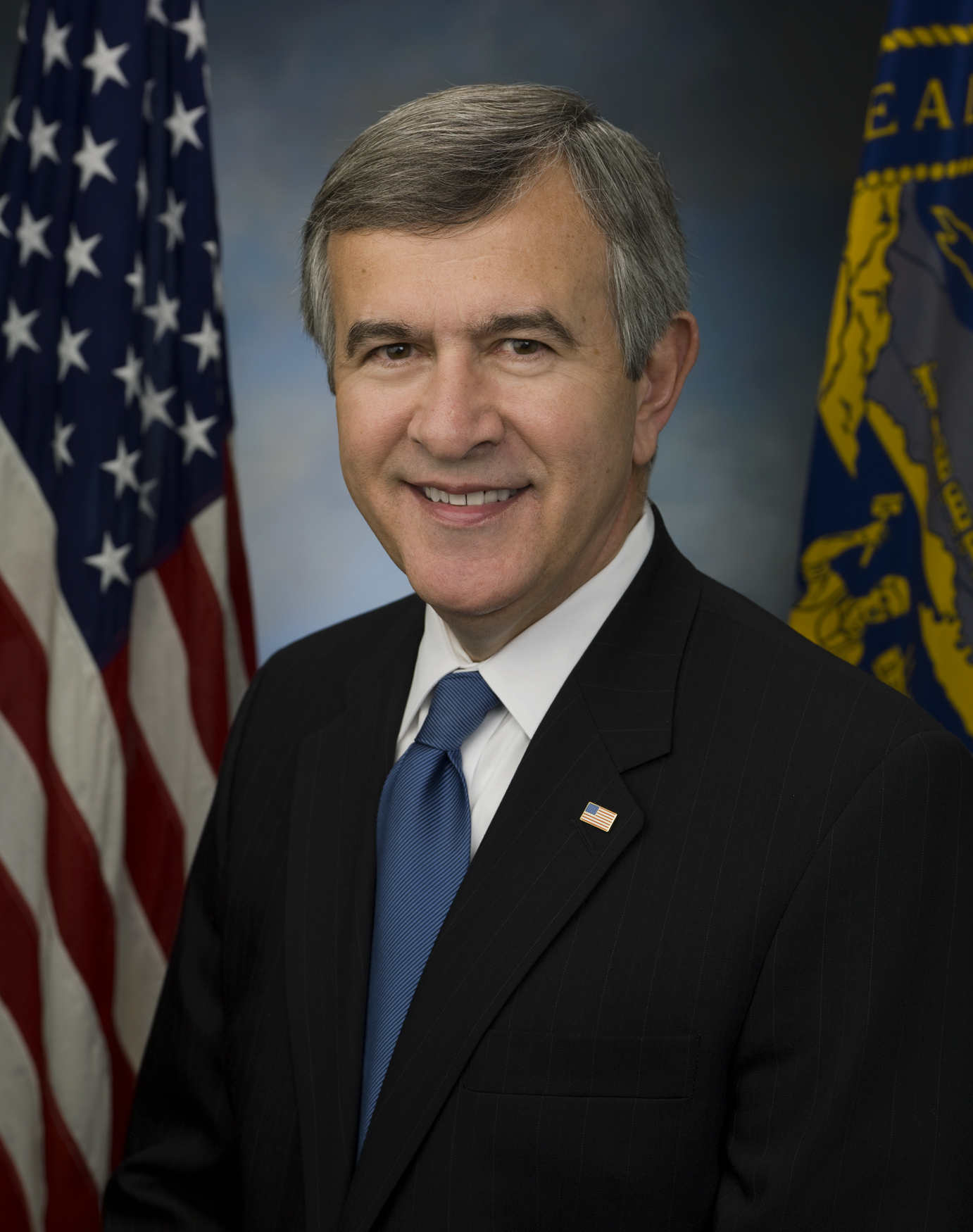

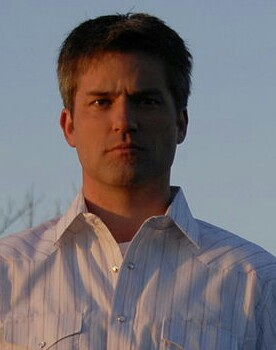
Nominee	Mike Johanns	Scott Kleeb
Party	Republican	Democratic
Popular vote	455,854	317,456
Percentage	57.5%	40.1%
- Johanns: 50–60% 60–70% 70–80% Kleeb: 40–50% 50–60% 60–70%
U.S. senator before election
Chuck Hagel
Republican
Elected U.S. senator
Mike Johanns
Republican

In Nebraska, incumbent Republican Chuck Hagel chose to retire rather than run for a third term.

Former Governor Mike Johanns, who recently resigned as Agriculture Secretary, was the Republican nominee, having defeated opponent Pat Flynn 87–13 in the primary. Scott Kleeb, 2006 candidate for Nebraska's 3rd congressional district, defeated businessman Tony Raimondo, a former Republican, by a wide margin in the Democratic primary.

Nebraska state Green Party Co-Chairman Steve Larrick was also a candidate, as was Kelly Rosberg of the Nebraska Party.

Johanns won, taking 58% of the vote, with Kleeb taking 40%.

Republican primary
Party	Candidate	Votes	%
Republican	Mike Johanns	112,191	78.61%
Republican	Pat Flynn	31,560	21.12%
Total votes		143,751	100.00%

Democratic primary
Party	Candidate	Votes	%
Democratic	Scott Kleeb	65,582	68.37%
Democratic	Tony Raimondo	24,141	25.17%
Democratic	James Bryan Wilson	3,224	3.36%
Democratic	Larry Marvin	2,672	2.80%
Total votes		95,919	100.00%

Green Party primary
Party	Candidate	Votes	%
Green	Steve Larrick	123	100.00%
Total votes		123	100.00%

Nebraska Party primary
Party	Candidate	Votes	%
Nebraska	Barry Richards	209	100.00%
Total votes		209	100.00%

General election
Party	Candidate	Votes	%	±%
Republican	Mike Johanns	455,854	57.5%	−25.2%
Democratic	Scott Kleeb	317,456	40.1%	+25.5%
Nebraska	Kelly Renee Rosberg	11,438	1.4%	n/a
Green	Steve Larrick	7,763	1.0%	n/a
Majority		138,398		
Turnout		792,511		
Republican hold		Swing		

== New Hampshire ==
New Hampshire election
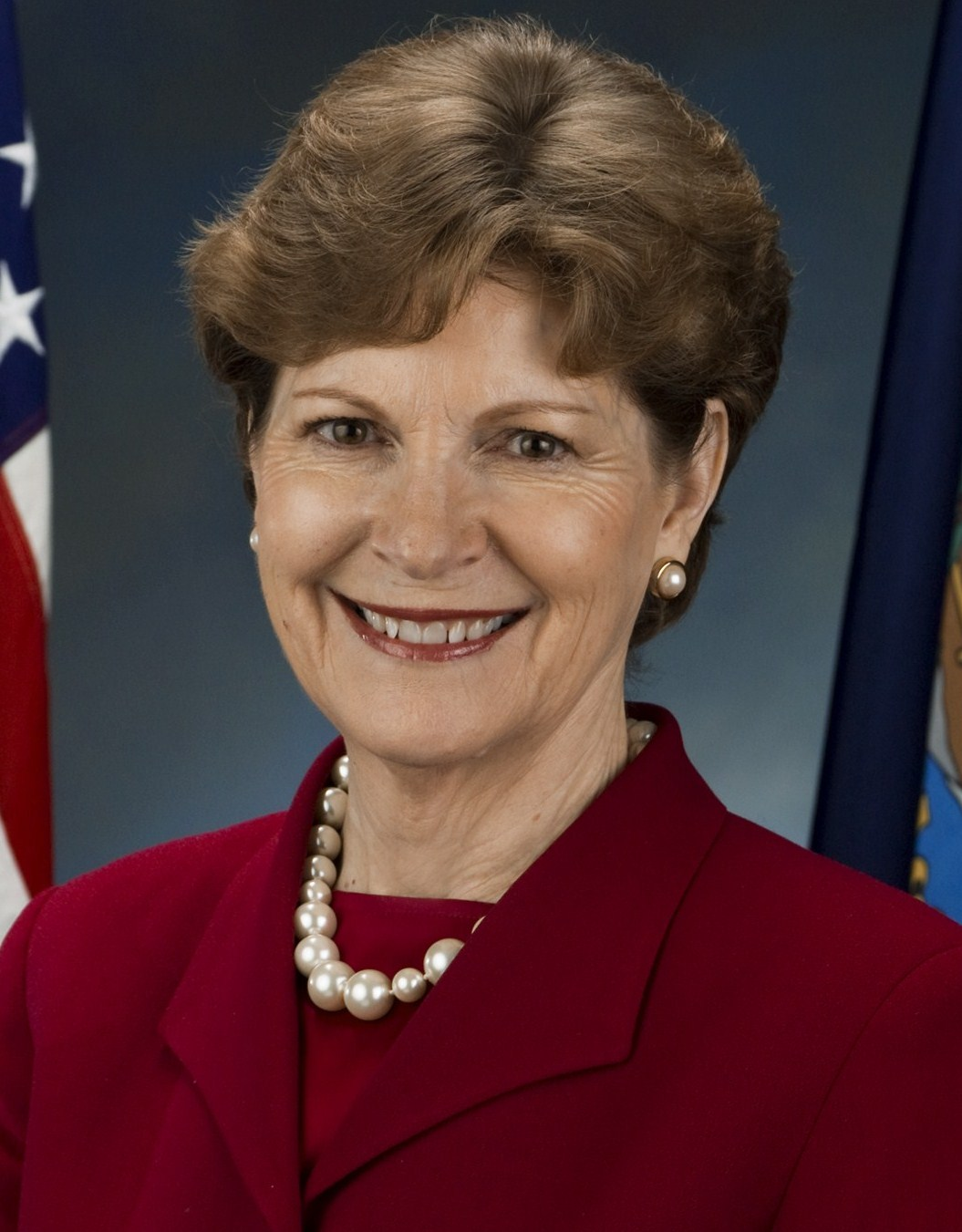

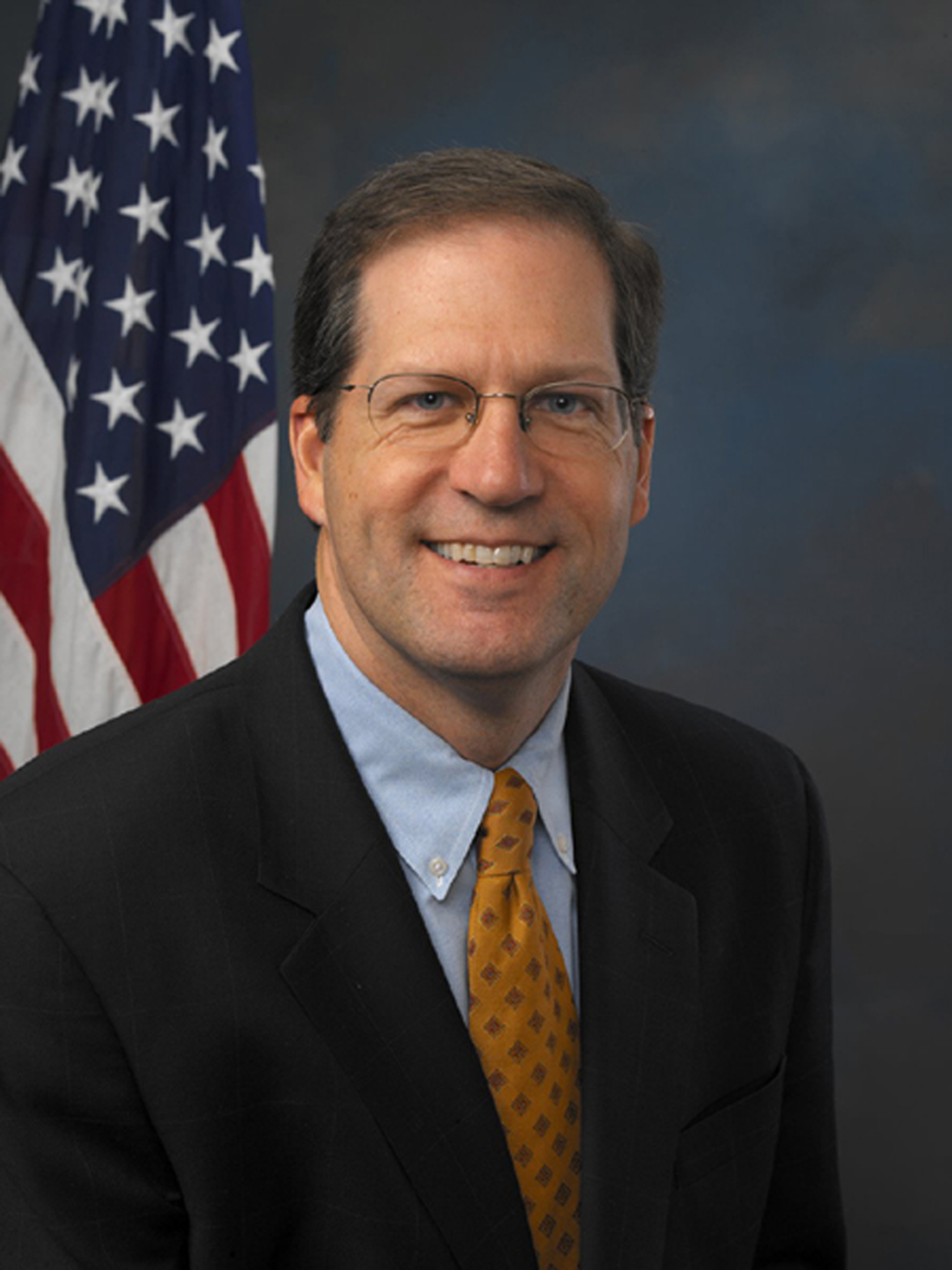
Nominee	Jeanne Shaheen	John E. Sununu
Party	Democratic	Republican
Popular vote	358,438	314,403
Percentage	51.6%	45.3%
- Shaheen: 40–50% 50–60% 60–70% 70–80% >90% Sununu: 40–50% 50–60% 60–70% 70–80% Tie: 40–50%
U.S. senator before election
John E. Sununu
Republican
Elected U.S. senator
Jeanne Shaheen
Democratic

Incumbent Republican John E. Sununu represented the swing state of New Hampshire. The state traditionally leaned Republican, but John Kerry from neighboring Massachusetts narrowly won the state in the 2004 Presidential election. New Hampshire also saw major Democratic gains in the 2006 elections, when Democrats took both of the previously Republican-held House seats, the gubernatorial race with a record vote share of 74%, and majorities in the State House and Senate, giving them concurrent control of both bodies for the first time since 1874. However, New Hampshire had not elected a Democratic United States senator since 1975.

Sununu's 2002 opponent, former Governor Jeanne Shaheen, decided to run and was generally considered to be a very formidable challenger. Three consecutive monthly Rasmussen Reports poll showed Shaheen defeating Sununu by 49% to 41%. Prior to Shaheen's entry, Portsmouth Mayor Steve Marchand, Katrina Swett, wife of former Democratic congressman Richard Swett, and former astronaut Jay Buckey had announced that they were running for the Democratic nomination. After Shaheen's entry, however, all three withdrew and endorsed the former governor.

On election day, Shaheen defeated Sununu, 52% to 45%.

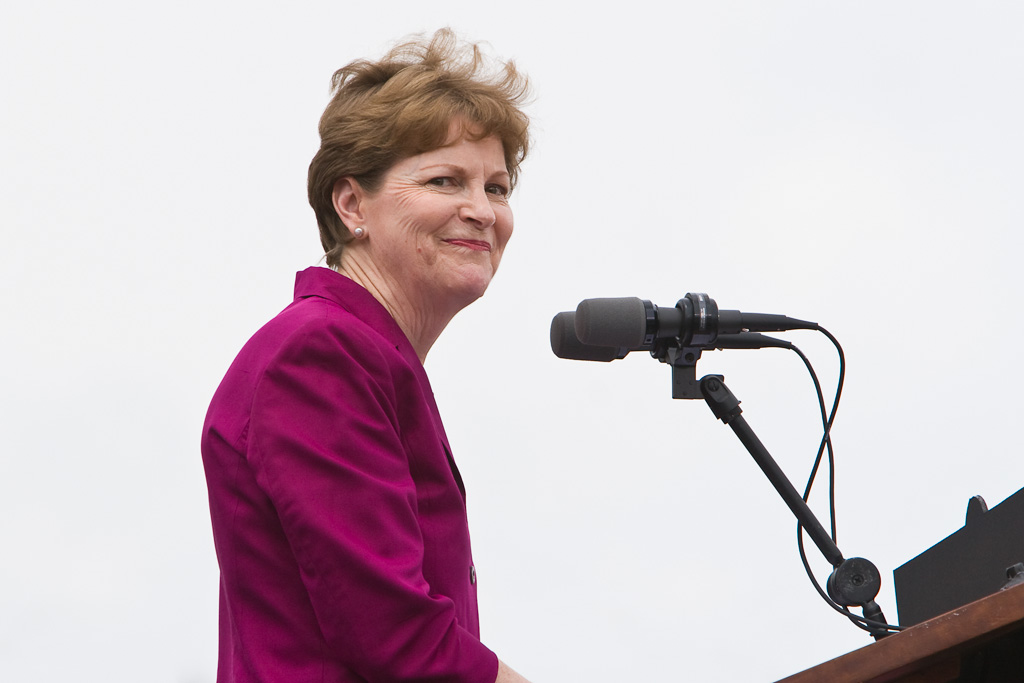
Shaheen, the Democratic choice, at a rally in the lead-up to the election.

Democratic primary
Party	Candidate	Votes	%	±%
Democratic	Jeanne Shaheen	43,968	88.5%	
Democratic	Raymond Stebbins	5,281	10.6%	
	write-ins	407	0.8%	
Turnout		49,656		

Republican primary
Party	Candidate	Votes	%	±%
Republican	John Sununu (Incumbent)	60,852	88.7%	
Republican	Tom Alciere	7,084	10.3%	
	write-ins	685	1.0%	
Turnout		68,621		

General election
Party	Candidate	Votes	%	±%
Democratic	Jeanne Shaheen	358,438	51.6%	+5.2%
Republican	John Sununu (Incumbent)	314,403	45.3%	−5.5%
Libertarian	Ken Blevens	21,516	3.1%	+0.9%
Majority		44,035		
Turnout		694,357		
Democratic gain from Republican		Swing		

== New Jersey ==
2008 United States Senate election in New Jersey
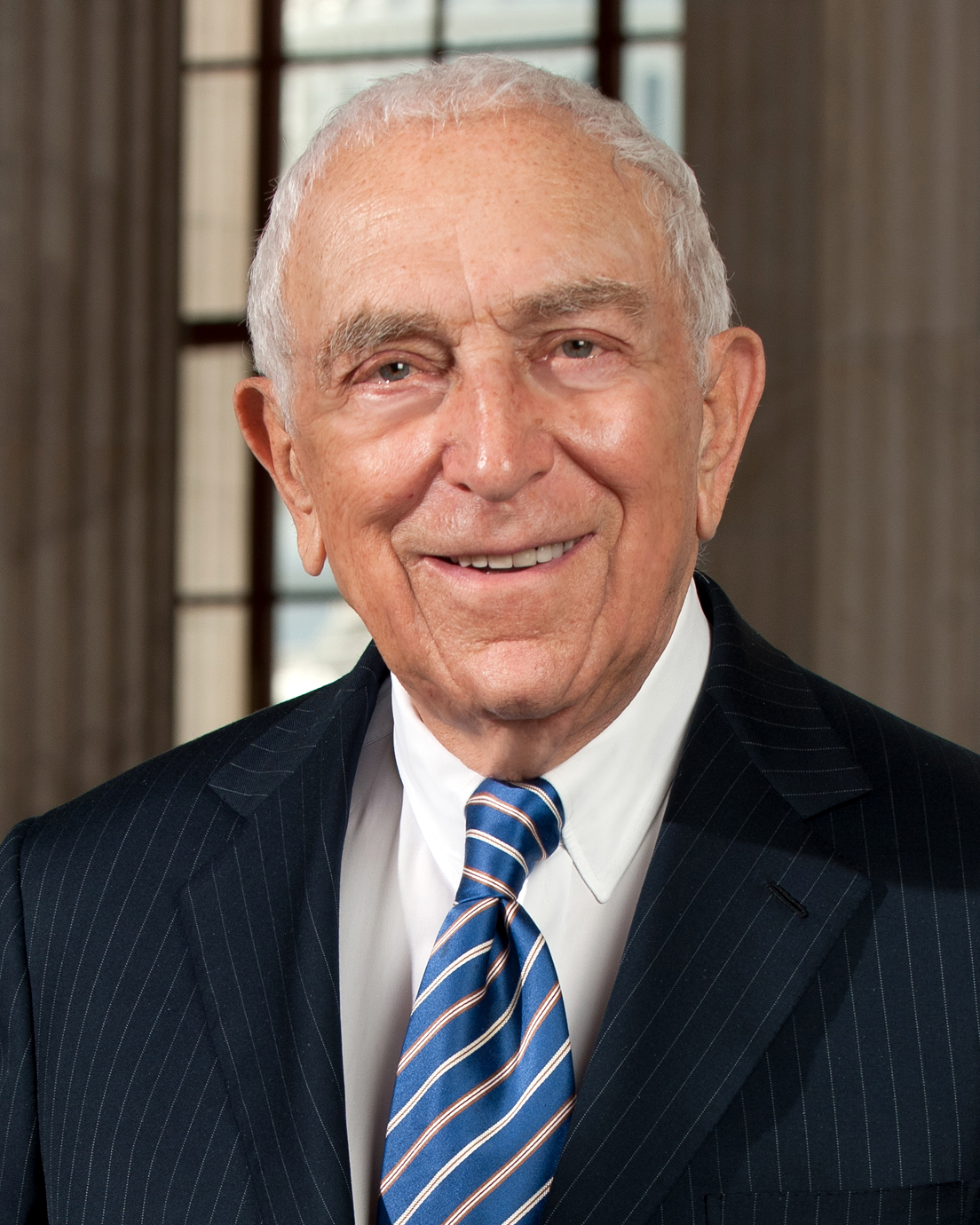

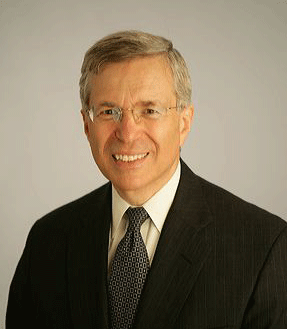
Nominee	Frank Lautenberg	Dick Zimmer
Party	Democratic	Republican
Popular vote	1,951,218	1,461,025
Percentage	56.0%	42.0%
- Lautenberg: 40–50% 50–60% 60–70% 70–80% 80–90% 90–100% Zimmer: 40–50% 50–60% 60–70% 70–80% 80–90%
U.S. senator before election
Frank Lautenberg
Democratic
Elected U.S. senator
Frank Lautenberg
Democratic

Incumbent Democrat Frank Lautenberg sought re-election in 2008, though he was 84. In the Primary, Lautenberg soundly defeated Representative Rob Andrews (NJ-1) by a margin of 62% to 32%. In November 2006, the senator had the lowest approval rating of any Democrat running for re-election in 2008 (with 39% approving and 45% disapproving), with his approval standing only at 42% as of September 2007 with voters saying he does not deserve re-election 46%-36%. The Republican nominee was former Congressman and 1996 senatorial candidate Dick Zimmer.

Sara Lobman of the Socialist Workers Party and Independent Anthony Fisher were also declared candidates. Furthermore, in the wake of the financial crisis, Carl Peter Klapper entered the race as a write-in candidate.

Lautenberg won re-election, winning 56%-42%.

Democratic primary
Party	Candidate	Votes	%	±%
Democratic	Frank Lautenberg (incumbent)	203,012	58.9%	
Democratic	Rob Andrews	121,777	35.3%	
Democratic	Donald Cresitello	19,743	5.7%	
Turnout		344,532		

Republican primary
Party	Candidate	Votes	%	±%
Republican	Dick Zimmer	84,663	45.8%	
Republican	Joseph Pennacchio	74,546	40.3%	
Republican	Murray Sabrin	25,576	13.8%	
Turnout		184,785		

General election
Party	Candidate	Votes	%	±%
Democratic	Frank Lautenberg (incumbent)	1,951,218	56.0%	+2.1%
Republican	Dick Zimmer	1,461,025	42.0%	−2.0%
Independent	Daryl Mikell Brooks	20,920	1.0%	n/a
Libertarian	Jason Scheurer	18,810	0.5%	n/a
Independent	J.M. Carter	15,935	0.5%	n/a
Independent	Jeff Boss	10,345	0.3%	n/a
Socialist Workers	Sara Lobman	9,187	0.3%	n/a
Majority		490,193		
Turnout		3,482,445		
Democratic hold		Swing		

== New Mexico ==
New Mexico election
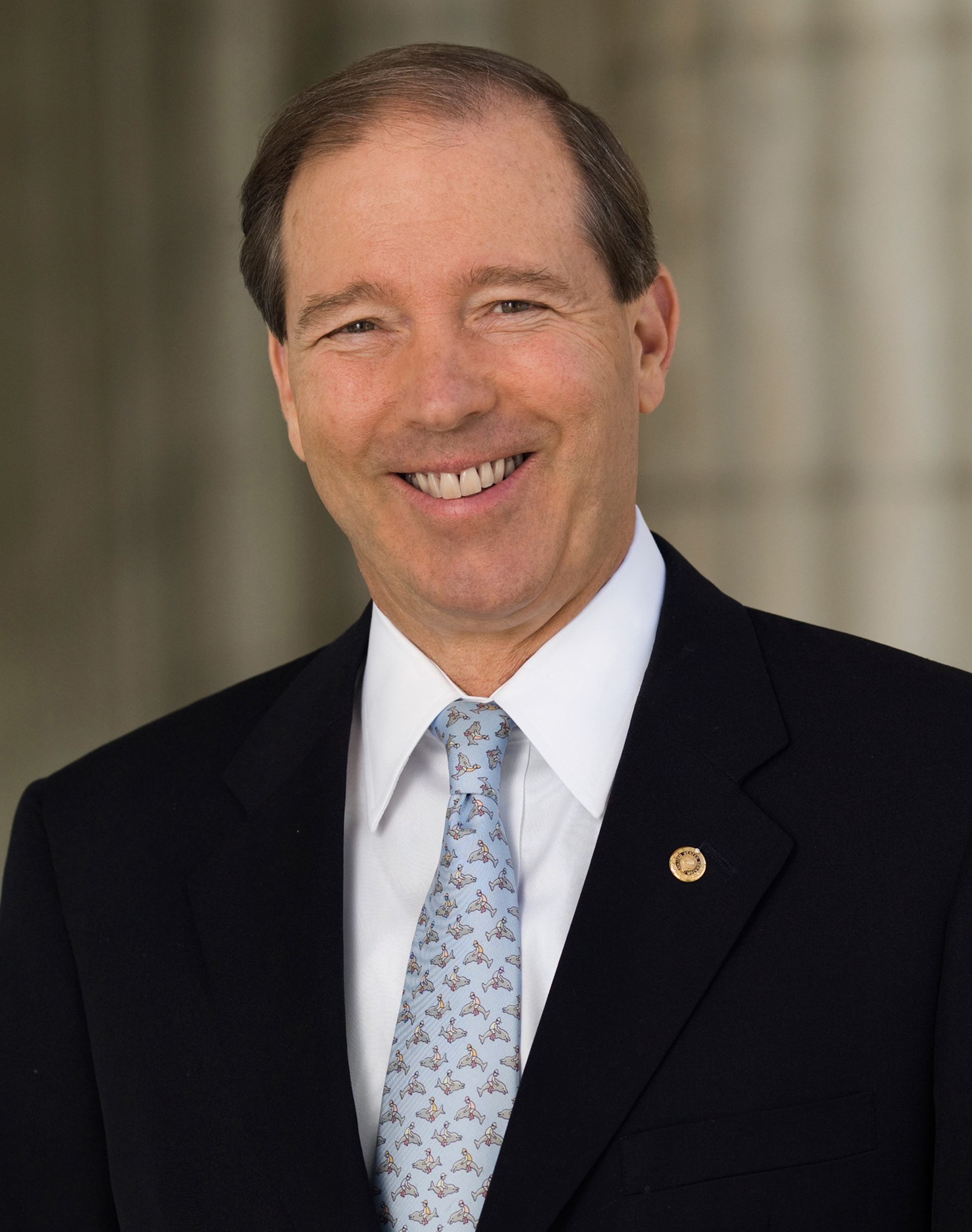

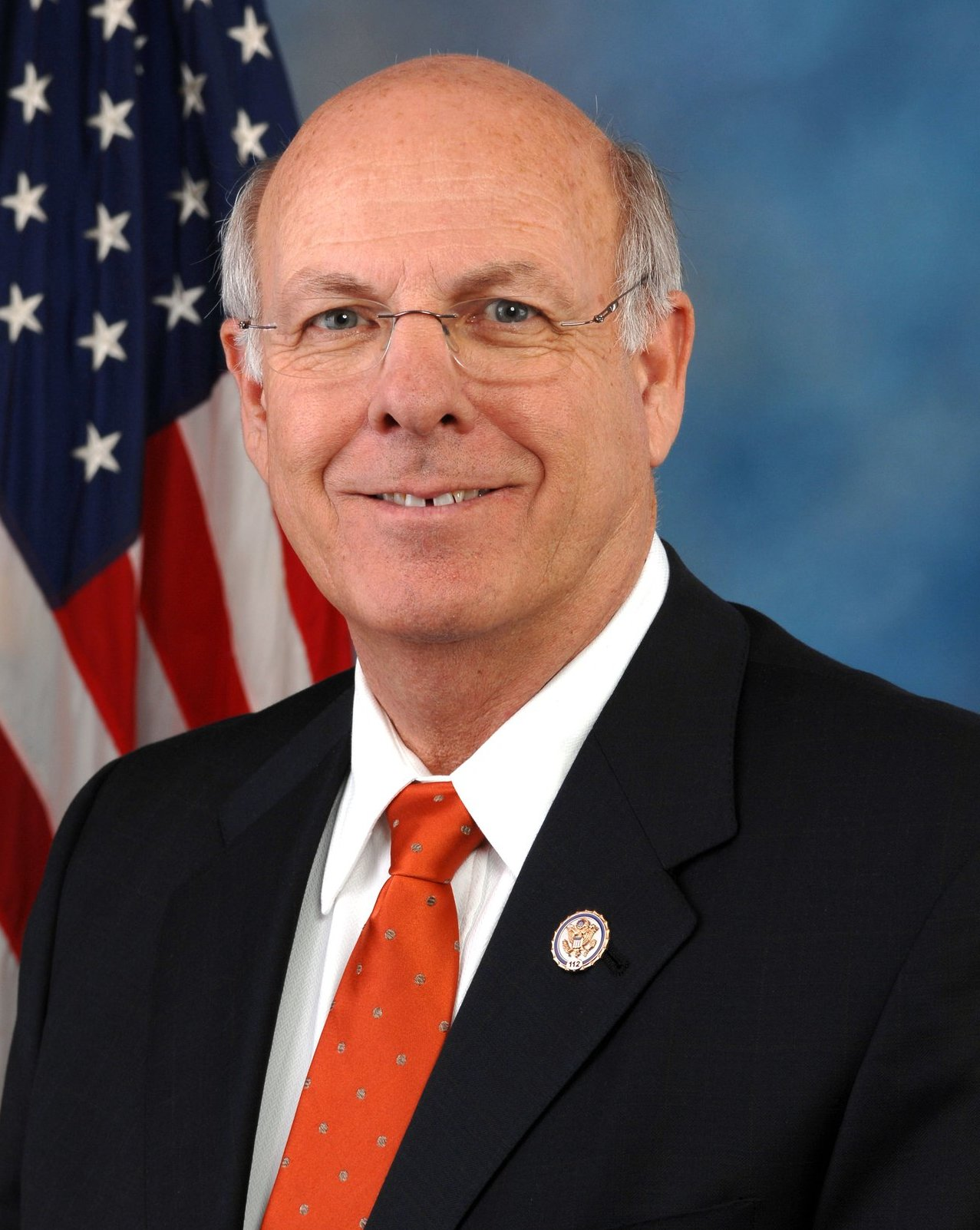
Nominee	Tom Udall	Steve Pearce
Party	Democratic	Republican
Popular vote	505,128	318,522
Percentage	61.3%	38.7%
- County results Udall: 50–60% 60–70% 70–80% 80–90% Pearce: 50–60% 60–70% 70–80%
U.S. senator before election
Pete Domenici
Republican
Elected U.S. senator
Tom Udall
Democratic

While senator Pete Domenici had declared that he would seek re-election in New Mexico, he changed his mind and announced on October 4, 2007, that he was retiring at the end of his current term due to a degenerative brain disorder. Domenici normally would have been expected to win re-election easily, having won his current term with the support of two out of three New Mexico voters; however, he was to be investigated by the Senate Ethics Committee for his role in firing U.S. Attorney David Iglesias. Domenici's role in the developing scandal had reduced the probability he would have been re-elected, and a SurveyUSA poll showed his approval ratings at 41%, with 54% disapproving. The potential scandal may have also contributed to his decision to leave the Senate.

Tom Udall, the popular Representative from New Mexico's 3rd District, was the Democratic nominee. The Republican nominee was Rep. Steve Pearce, who represented the more conservative southern part of the state.

When asked whether the Republicans were abandoning their hopes of holding onto Domenici's seat, senator John Ensign, the chairman of the National Republican Senatorial Committee, responded that "You don't waste money on races that don't need it or you can't win."

Udall won the election with 61% of the vote, with Pearce taking 39%.

Democratic Party primary
Party	Candidate	Votes	%
Democratic	Tom Udall	141,629	100.00%
Total votes		141,629	100.00%

Republican primary
Party	Candidate	Votes	%
Republican	Steve Pearce	57,953	51.29%
Republican	Heather Wilson	55,039	48.71%
Total votes		112,992	100.00%

New Mexico general
Party	Candidate	Votes	%	±%
Democratic	Tom Udall	505,128	61.33%	+26.37%
Republican	Steve Pearce	318,522	38.67%	−26.37%
Majority		186,606	22.66%	−7.43%
Turnout		823,650		
Democratic gain from Republican		Swing		

== North Carolina ==
North Carolina election
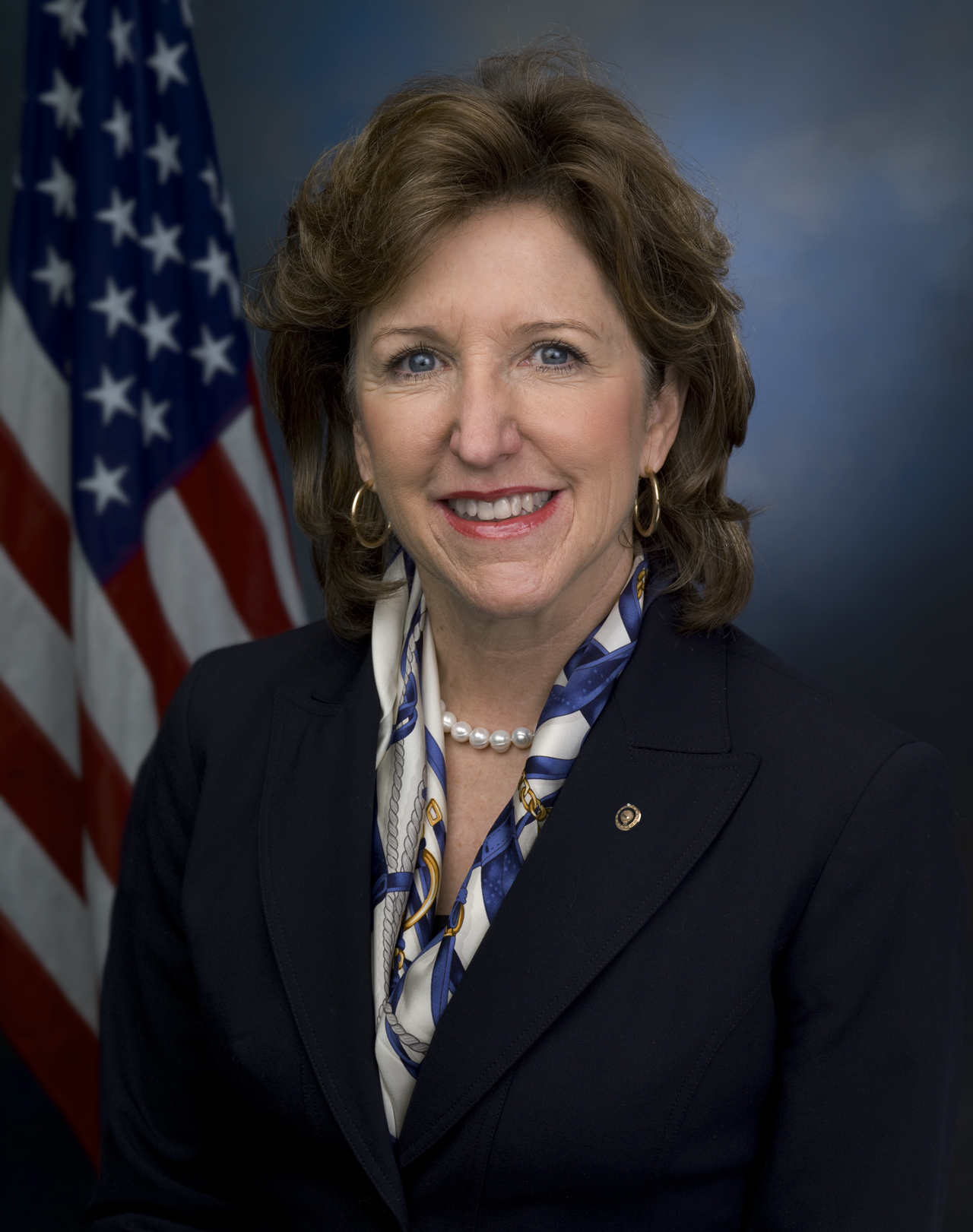

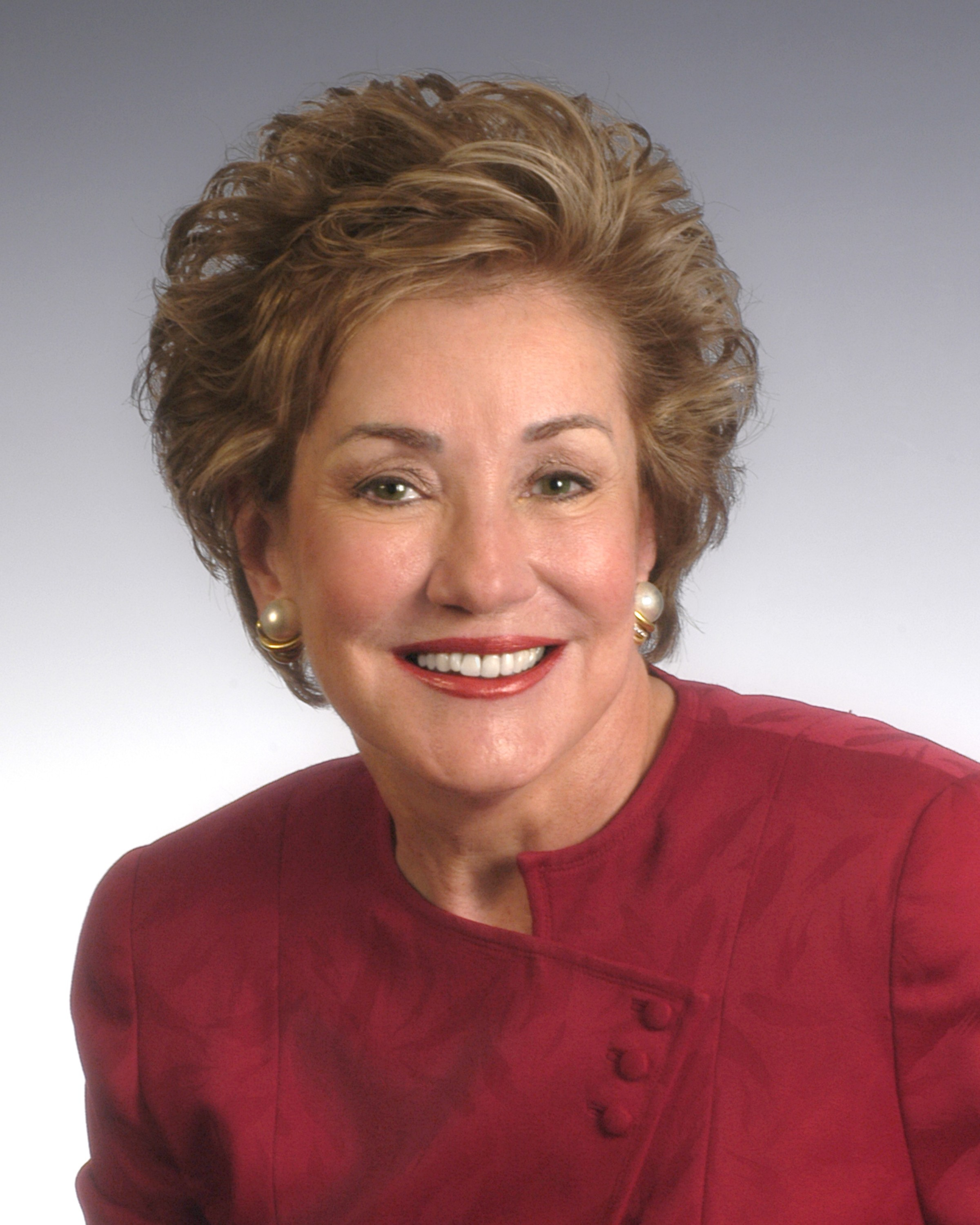
Nominee	Kay Hagan	Elizabeth Dole
Party	Democratic	Republican
Popular vote	2,249,311	1,887,510
Percentage	52.7%	44.2%
- Hagan: 40–50% 50–60% 60–70% 70–80% Dole: 40–50% 50–60% 60–70%
U.S. senator before election
Elizabeth Dole
Republican
Elected U.S. senator
Kay Hagan
Democratic

In North Carolina, there had been rumors that senator Elizabeth Dole would retire from the Senate and run for governor, but she said in 2006 that she intended to run for re-election. There was early speculation that North Carolina Governor Mike Easley might be pressured into running against her but this did not come to pass. The Democratic nominee was state senator Kay Hagan, who defeated Jim Neal and Dustin Lassiter in the Democratic primary. A Rasmussen poll released May 11, 2008, showed Hagan leading Dole by a statistically insignificant margin, 48% - 47%, suggesting a competitive race. Hagan's poll numbers continued to best Dole's, however, and Hagan defeated Dole by a wider than expected margin of 53% to 44%.

Democratic Primary election
Party	Candidate	Votes	%	±%
Democratic	Kay Hagan	801,920	60.1%	
Democratic	Jim Neal	239,623	18.0%	
Democratic	Marcus W. Williams	170,970	12.8%	
Democratic	Duskin Lassiter	62,136	4.6%	
Democratic	Howard Staley	60,403	4.5%	
Turnout		1,335,052		

Republican primary
Party	Candidate	Votes	%	±%
Republican	Elizabeth Dole (Incumbent)	460,665	90.0%	
Republican	Pete DiLauro	51,406	10.0%	
Turnout		512,071		

North Carolina general
Party	Candidate	Votes	%	±%
Democratic	Kay Hagan	2,249,311	52.65%	+7.7%
Republican	Elizabeth Dole (Incumbent)	1,887,510	44.18%	−9.4%
Libertarian	Chris Cole	133,430	3.17%	+2.1%
Other	Write-Ins	1,719	0.0%	0.0%
Majority		361,801		
Turnout		4,271,970		
Democratic gain from Republican		Swing		

== Oklahoma ==
Oklahoma election
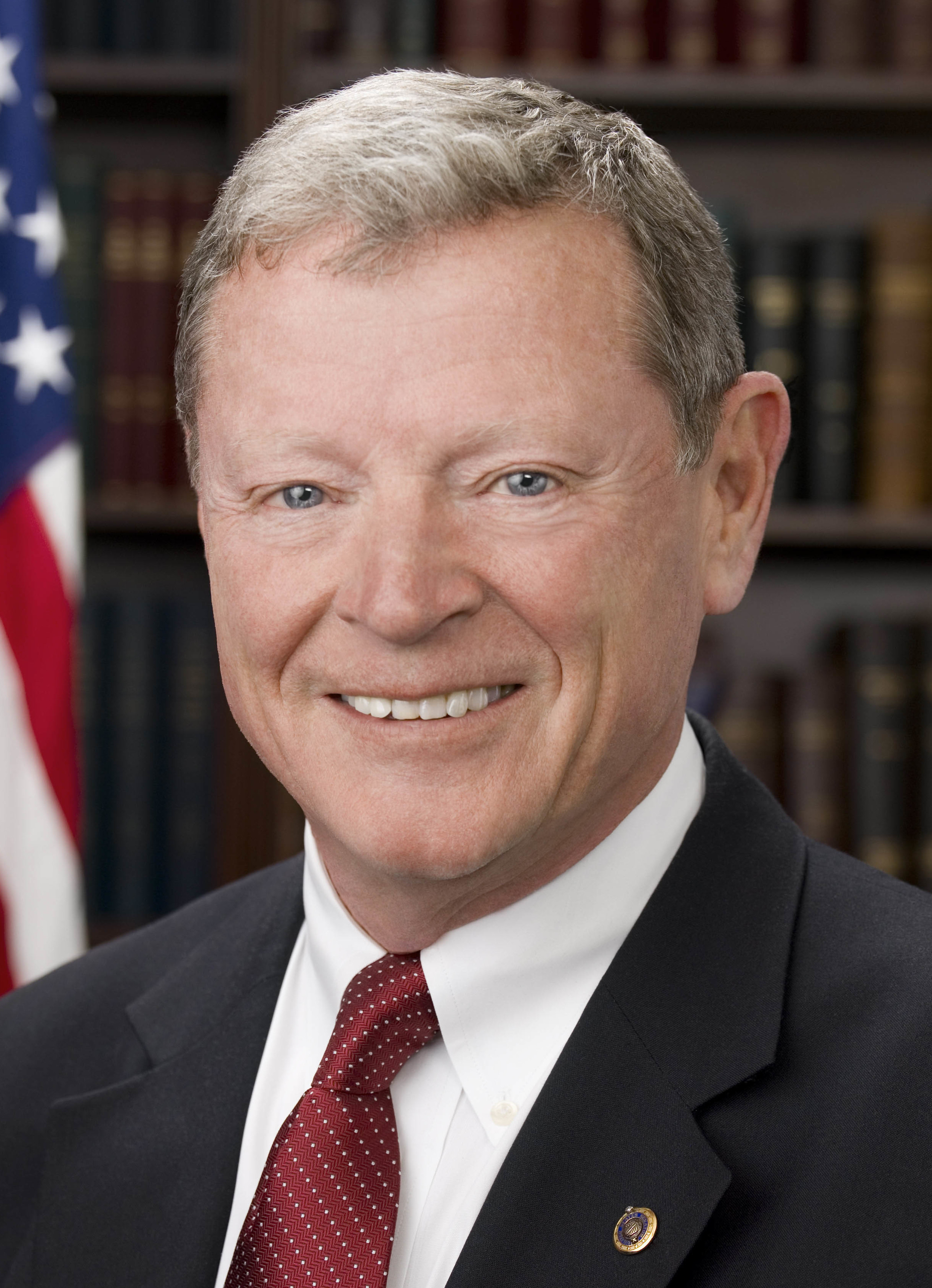

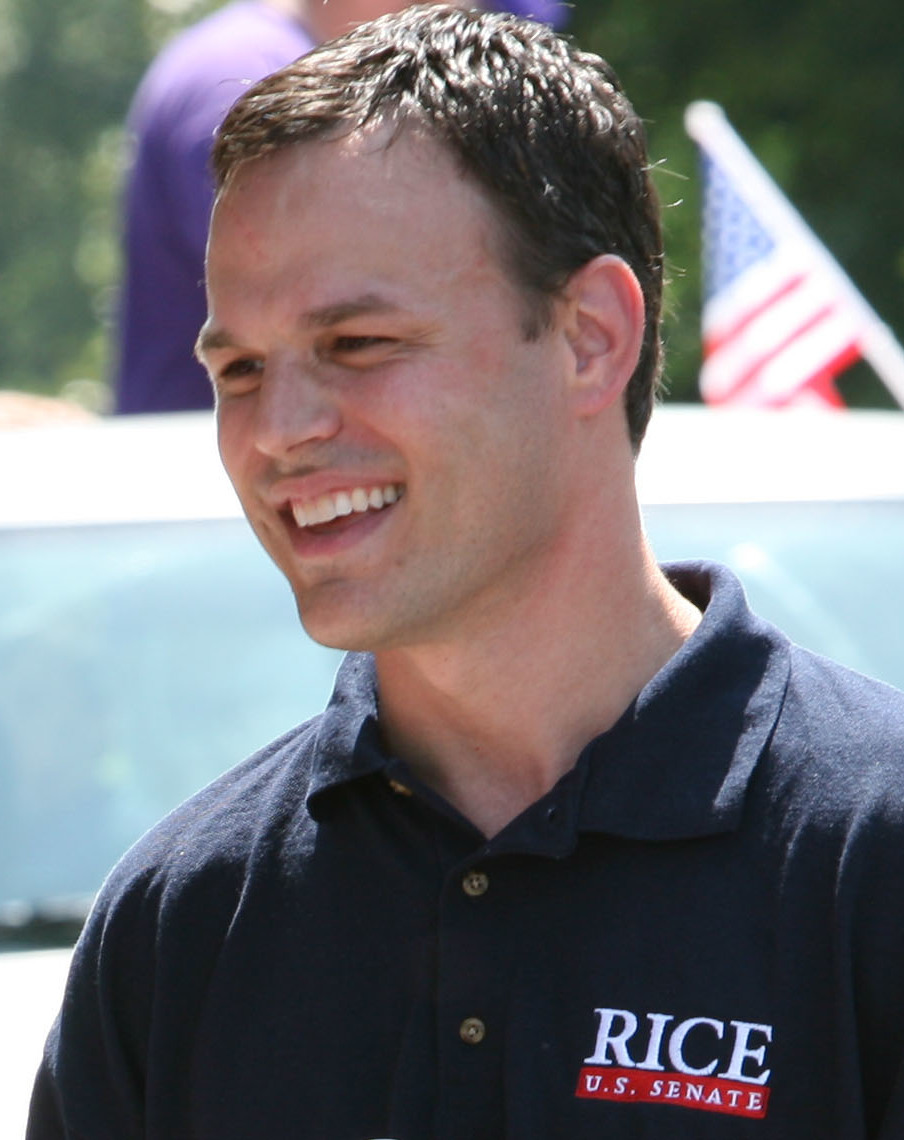
Nominee	Jim Inhofe	Andrew Rice
Party	Republican	Democratic
Popular vote	763,375	527,736
Percentage	56.7%	39.2%
- County results Inhofe: 40–50% 50–60% 60–70% 70–80% 80–90% Rice: 50–60%
U.S. senator before election
Jim Inhofe
Republican
Elected U.S. senator
Jim Inhofe
Republican

In Oklahoma, senator Jim Inhofe announced that he would seek a third full term. A September 2007 poll put Inhofe's approval rating at 47%, with 41% disapproving of his performance. Inhofe's opponent was State senator Andrew Rice. Inhofe was re-elected, 57% to 39%.

Democratic primary
Party	Candidate	Votes	%
Democratic	Andrew Rice	113,795	59.65%
Democratic	Jim Rogers	76,981	40.35%
Total votes		190,776	100.00%

Republican primary
Party	Candidate	Votes	%
Republican	Jim Inhofe (Incumbent)	116,371	84.18%
Republican	Evelyn R. Rogers	10,770	7.79%
Republican	Ted Ryals	7,306	5.28%
Republican	Dennis Lopez	3,800	2.75%
Total votes		138,247	100.00%

Oklahoma general
Party	Candidate	Votes	%	±%
Republican	Jim Inhofe (Incumbent)	763,375	56.68%	−0.62%
Democratic	Andrew Rice	527,736	39.18%	+2.87%
Independent	Stephen Wallace	55,708	4.14%	
Majority		235,639	17.50%	−3.50%
Turnout		1,346,819		
Republican hold		Swing		

== Oregon ==
Oregon election
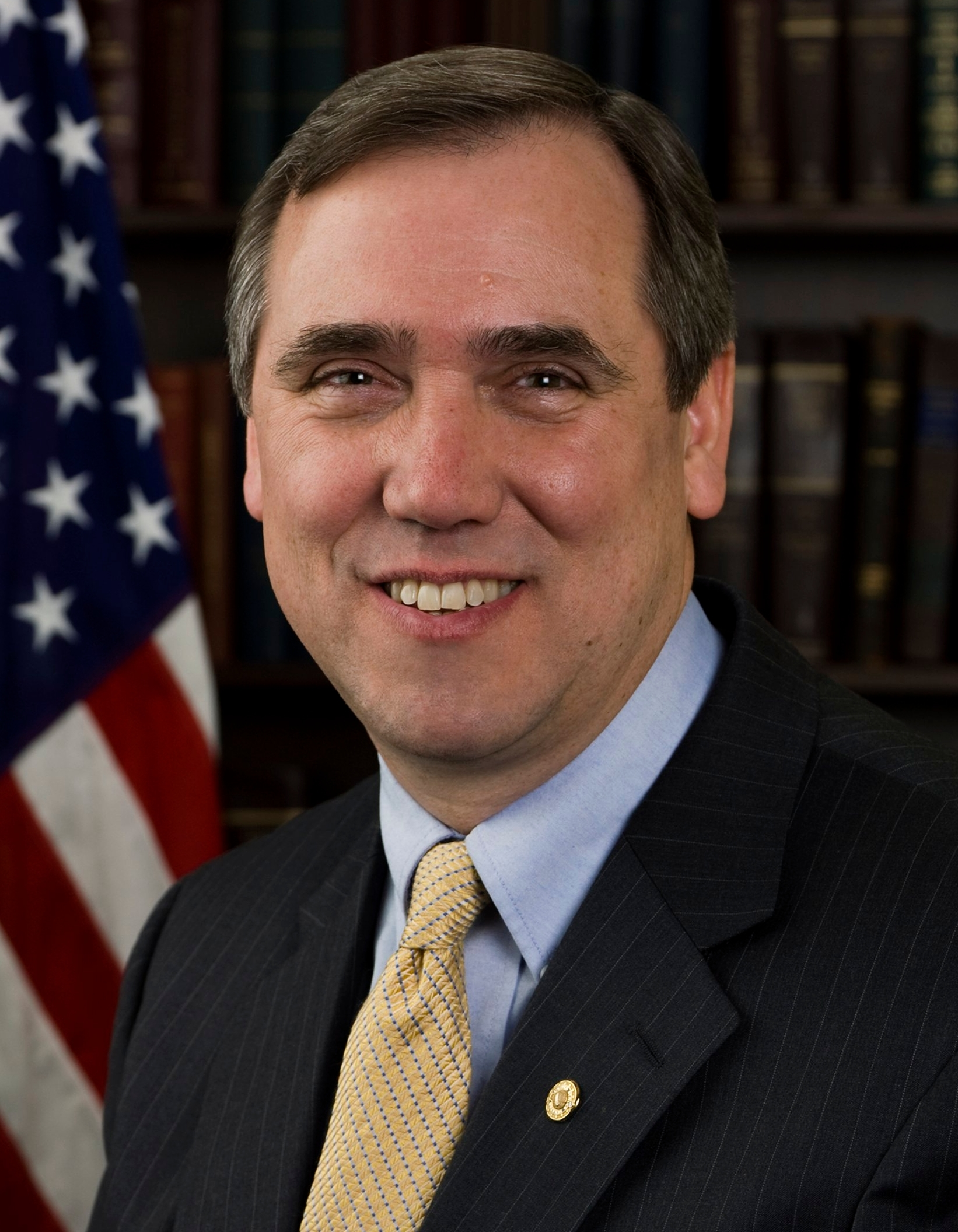

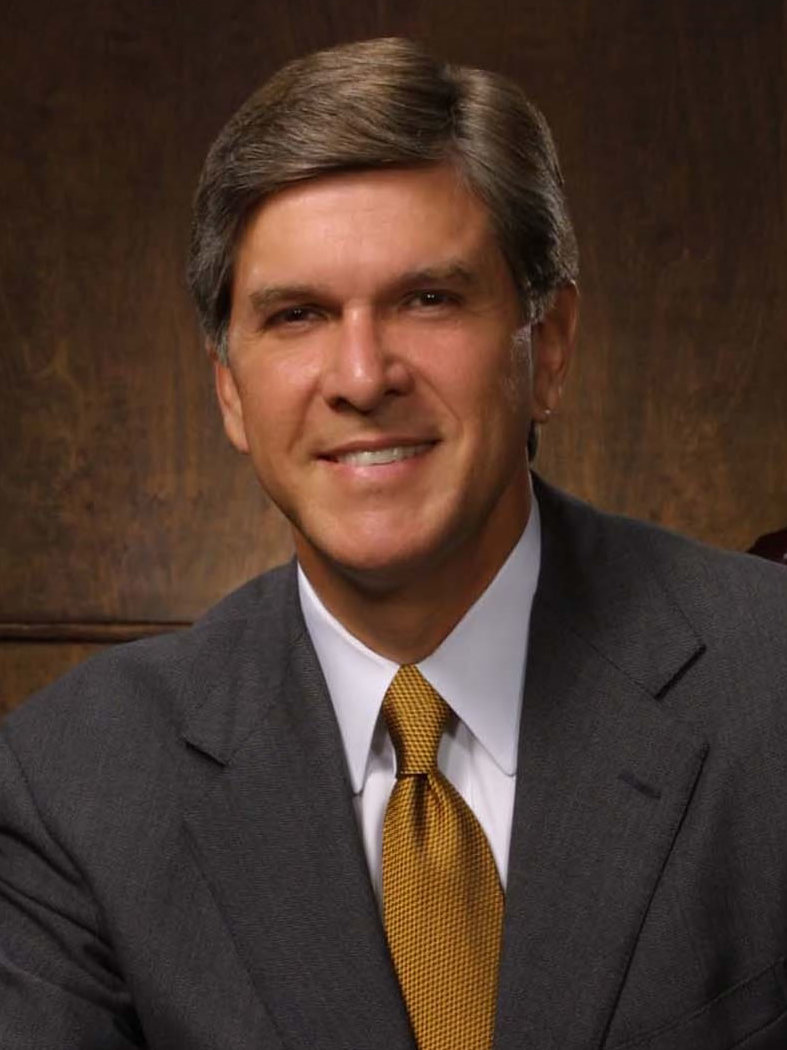

Nominee	Jeff Merkley	Gordon Smith	David Brownlow
Party	Democratic	Republican	Constitution
Popular vote	864,392	805,159	92,565
Percentage	48.9%	45.6%	5.2%
- Merkley: 40–50% 50–60% 60–70% Smith: 40–50% 50–60% 60–70% 70–80%
U.S. senator before election
Gordon H. Smith
Republican
Elected U.S. senator
Jeff Merkley
Democratic

Senator Gordon Smith of Oregon ran for a third term. He defeated ophthalmologist Gordon Leitch in the May 20 Republican primary. Smith faced Democratic Oregon House of Representatives Speaker Jeff Merkley in the November general election. Merkley beat longtime Democratic activist Steve Novick and three other candidates in a hotly contested primary.

In a July 16, 2008, poll, Merkley overtook Smith for the first time 43% to 41%.

On November 6, 2008, Jeff Merkley was projected the winner of the contest, with 48.9% to Smith's 45.6%. Gordon Smith formally conceded soon afterward.

Democratic primary
Party	Candidate	Votes	%
Democratic	Jeff Merkley	246,482	44.82%
Democratic	Steve Novick	230,889	41.98%
Democratic	Candy Neville	38,367	6.98%
Democratic	Roger S. Obrist	12,647	2.30%
Democratic	Pavel Goberman	12,056	2.19%
Democratic	David Loera	6,127	1.11%
Democratic	Write-ins	3,398	0.62%
Total votes		549,966	100.00%

Republican primary
Party	Candidate	Votes	%
Republican	Gordon Smith (Incumbent)	296,330	85.41%
Republican	Gordon Leitch	48,560	14.00%
Republican	Write-ins	2,068	0.69%
Total votes		309,943	100.00%

Oregon general
Party	Candidate	Votes	%	±%
Democratic	Jeff Merkley	864,392	48.90%	+9.30%
Republican	Gordon H. Smith (Incumbent)	805,159	45.55%	−10.66%
Constitution	David Brownlow	92,565	5.24%	+3.52%
Write-ins		5,388	0.30%	
Majority		59,233	3.35%	−13.25%
Turnout		1,767,504		
Democratic gain from Republican		Swing		

== Rhode Island ==
Rhode Island election
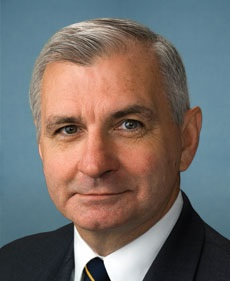

Nominee	Jack Reed	Robert Tingle
Party	Democratic	Republican
Popular vote	320,644	116,174
Percentage	73.4%	26.6%
- Reed: 50–60% 60–70% 70–80% 80–90%
U.S. senator before election
Jack Reed
Democratic
Elected U.S. senator
Jack Reed
Democratic

In Rhode Island, Democratic senator Jack Reed had an approval rating of 66% in November 2006. National Journal has declared that "Reed is probably the safest incumbent of the 2008 cycle". Reed's opponent was Robert Tingle, a pit manager at the Foxwoods Resort Casino in Connecticut, whom Reed defeated in his re-election campaign in 2002.

Reed won the election, with 73% of the vote.

2008 Rhode Island U.S. Senate Democratic primary
Party	Candidate	Votes	%	±%
Democratic	Jack Reed (incumbent)	48,038	86.8%	
Democratic	Christopher Young	7,277	13.2%	
Turnout		55,315		

2008 Rhode Island U.S. Senate general election
Party	Candidate	Votes	%	±%
Democratic	Jack Reed (incumbent)	320,644	73.4%	−5.0%
Republican	Bob Tingle	116,174	26.6%	+5.0%
Majority		204,470		
Turnout		436,818		
Democratic hold		Swing		

== South Carolina ==
South Carolina election
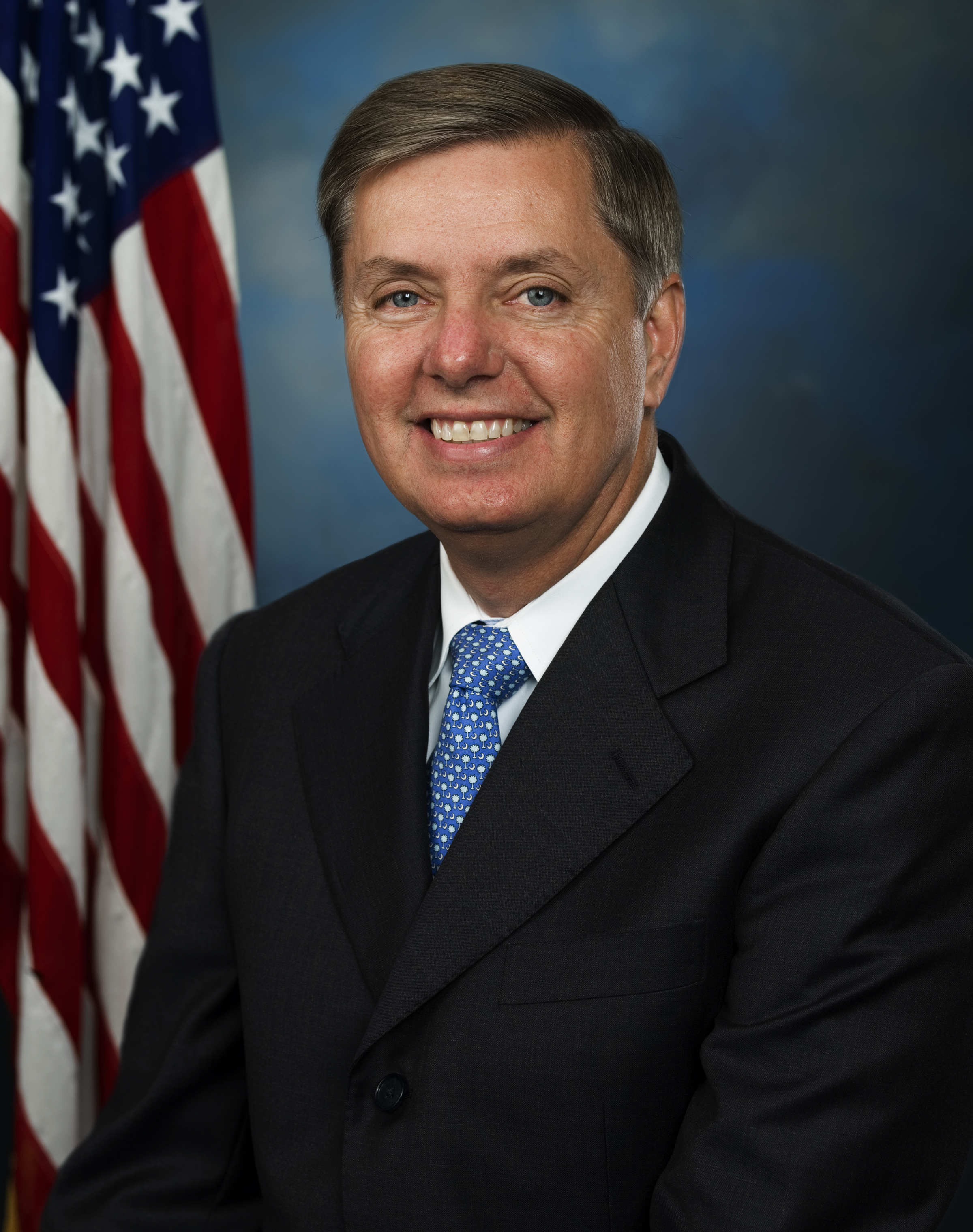

Nominee	Lindsey Graham	Bob Conley
Party	Republican	Democratic
Popular vote	1,076,150	790,216
Percentage	57.5%	42.3%
- Graham: 50–60% 60–70% 70–80% Conley: 50–60% 60–70% 70–80%
U.S. senator before election
Lindsey Graham
Republican
Elected U.S. senator
Lindsey Graham
Republican

Senator Lindsey Graham, as a popular Republican incumbent in strongly conservative South Carolina, had been considered unlikely to be vulnerable to a Democratic challenge. Graham's support for a compromise immigration bill, however, drew an angry response from many South Carolina conservatives, who recruited Buddy Witherspoon, a former South Carolina Republican Party leader, to challenge Graham for the nomination. Graham easily bested Witherspoon in the June 10 primary.

First-time candidate Bob Conley, an airline pilot, was the Democratic nominee. Conley, whose victory in the Democratic primary over Michael Cone was a surprise, is a former Republican who supported Ron Paul in 2008 and campaigned as the more conservative candidate on some issues, notably illegal immigration and the bailout of Wall Street.

The South Carolina Working Families Party had also nominated Michael Cone. South Carolina's election law allows for electoral fusion. This was the first time the party nominated a candidate for statewide office. However, because he lost the Democratic primary, Cone was not listed on the ballot under the state's sore loser law.

Graham easily won re-election with 58% of the vote to Conley's 42%.

2008 South Carolina U.S. Senate Democratic primary
Party	Candidate	Votes	%	±%
Democratic	Bob Conley	74,125	50.3%	
Democratic	Michael Cone	73,127	49.7%	
Turnout		147,252		

2008 South Carolina U.S. Senate Republican primary
Party	Candidate	Votes	%	±%
Republican	Lindsey Graham (incumbent)	187,736	66.8%	
Republican	Buddy Witherspoon	93,125	33.2%	
Turnout		280,861		

South Carolina general
Party	Candidate	Votes	%	±%
Republican	Lindsey Graham (incumbent)	1,076,534	57.52%	+3.1%
Democratic	Bob Conley	790,621	42.25%	−1.9%
Write-ins		4,276	0.23%	+0.1%
Majority		285,913		
Turnout		1,871,431		
Republican hold		Swing		

== South Dakota ==
South Dakota election
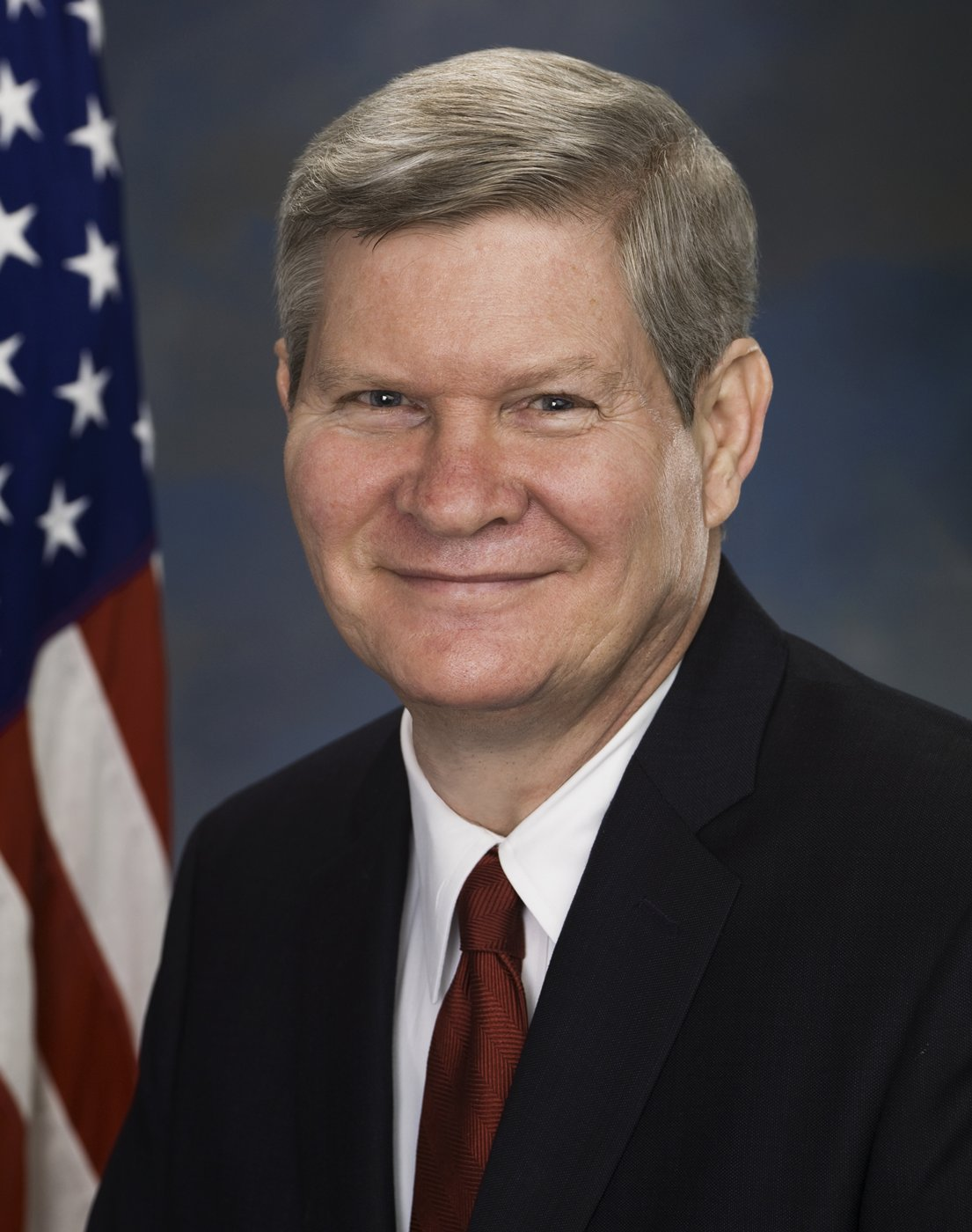

Nominee	Tim Johnson	Joel Dykstra
Party	Democratic	Republican
Popular vote	237,835	142,766
Percentage	62.5%	37.5%
- County results Johnson: 50–60% 60–70% 70–80% 80–90% Dykstra: 50–60% 60–70%
U.S. senator before election
Tim Johnson
Democratic
Elected U.S. senator
Tim Johnson
Democratic

In South Dakota, senator Tim Johnson's seat was considered a top GOP target in 2008, considering Johnson's narrow 524-vote victory in 2002 over then-Representative and current U.S. senator John Thune, as well as his recent health problems. Johnson underwent surgery in December 2006 for a cerebral arteriovenous malformation and was discharged from the hospital on April 30, 2007. On October 19, 2007, Johnson formally announced that he was seeking re-election. According to a November 2006 SurveyUSA poll, Johnson had an approval rating of 70%, with just 26% disapproving of his performance, making him an early favorite despite the state's Republican lean.

Republicans were unsuccessful in persuading Governor Mike Rounds and former Lieutenant Governor Steve Kirby to run. State Representative Joel Dykstra announced his candidacy on July 5, 2007. Other Republicans included Charles Lyonel Gonyo and Sam Kephart. Dykstra won the Republican primary on June 3.

Johnson was re-elected, with 62.5% to Dykstra's 37.5%. This seat was the tipping point state in the 2008 senate elections.

Republican primary
Party	Candidate	Votes	%
Republican	Joel Dykstra	34,598	65.74%
Republican	Sam Kephart	13,047	24.79%
Republican	Charles Gonyo	4,983	9.47%
Total votes		52,628	100.00%

South Dakota general
Party	Candidate	Votes	%	±%
Democratic	Tim Johnson (Incumbent)	237,889	62.49%	+12.87%
Republican	Joel Dykstra	142,784	37.51%	−11.96%
Majority		95,105	24.98%	+24.83%
Turnout		380,673		
Democratic hold		Swing		

== Tennessee ==
Tennessee election
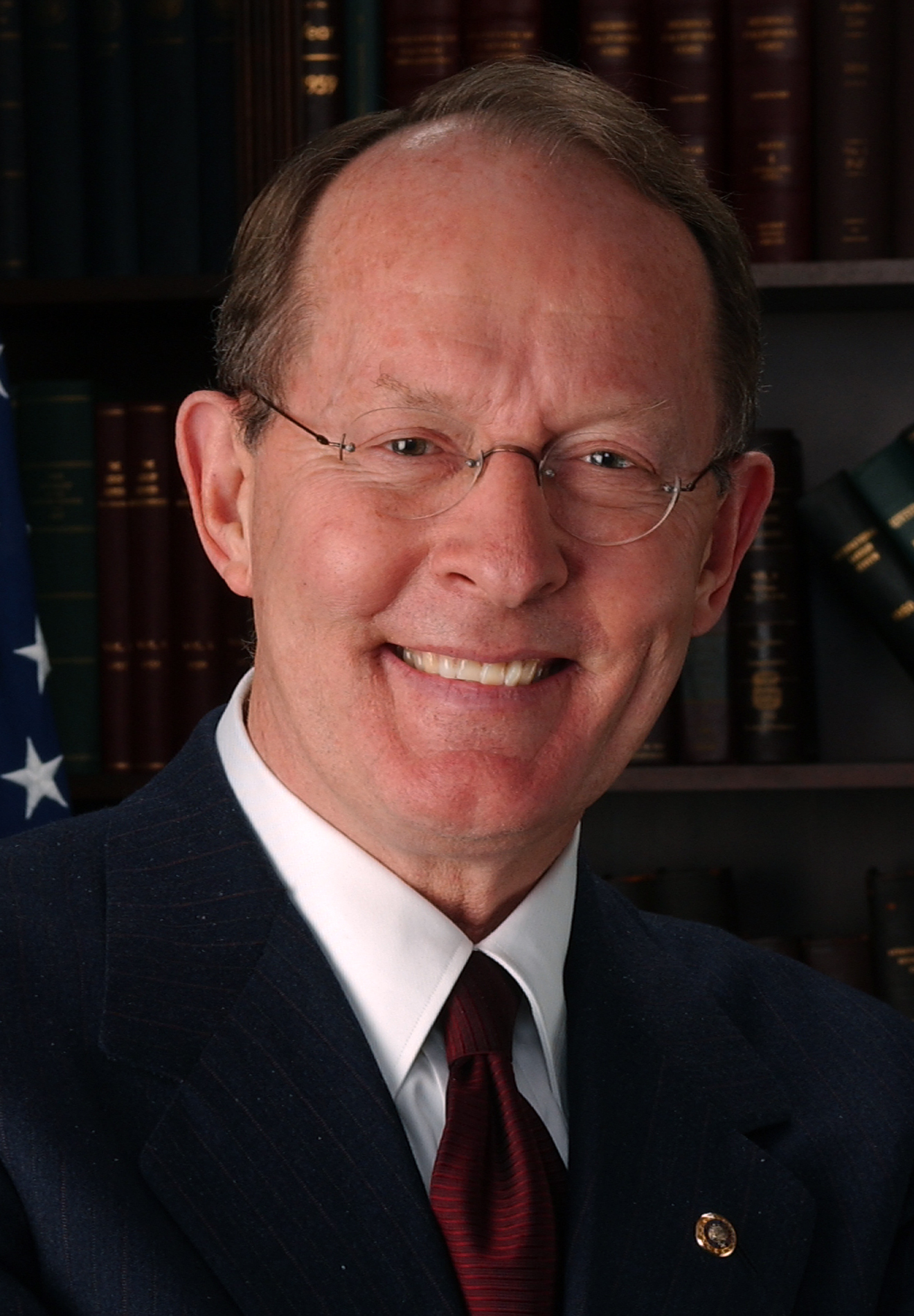

Nominee	Lamar Alexander	Bob Tuke
Party	Republican	Democratic
Popular vote	1,571,637	762,779
Percentage	65.14%	32.64%
- Alexander: 40–50% 50–60% 60–70% 70–80% 80–90% Tuke: 50–60%
U.S. senator before election
Lamar Alexander
Republican
Elected U.S. senator
Lamar Alexander
Republican

Former Governor and U.S. Secretary of Education Lamar Alexander was elected in 2002 to succeed retiring senator Fred Thompson. He has announced he will seek a second term in 2008. He was unopposed in the Republican primary.

Former Chairman of the Tennessee Democratic Party Bob Tuke was the Democratic nominee, defeating Businessman Gary Davis 30% to 23%. Knox County Clerk Mike Padgett received 20% of the vote.

2006 Green Party Senate nominee Chris Lugo originally announced as a Democrat but dropped out of the Democratic race before the filing deadline. He filed as an independent and was subsequently named as the Green Party nominee Edward Buck was also in the race.

Daniel Lewis ran as a Libertarian candidate for the United States Senate. He was certified March 3, 2008, by the Tennessee Division of Elections as having achieved ballot access for the November 4, 2008, election as a candidate for United States Senate. The Libertarian Party of Tennessee officially selected Daniel Lewis as their candidate for United States Senate on Saturday March 8, 2008, at their annual convention held in Nashville, Tennessee. Mr. Lewis was serving as the chairman of the Libertarian Party of Metropolitan Nashville and Davidson County. He ran for the Tennessee House in 2004.

Also reported to be in the race are David "None of the Above" Gatchell a ballot activist & frequent candidate and Emory "Bo" Heyward, a software company employee, conservative activist & 2006 candidate.

Alexander won the election with 65% of the vote.

Democratic Party primary
Party	Candidate	Votes	%
Democratic	Bob Tuke	59,050	32.21%
Democratic	Gary G. Davis	39,119	21.34%
Democratic	Mike Padgett	33,471	18.26%
Democratic	Mark E. Clayton	32,309	17.62%
Democratic	Kenneth Eaton	14,702	8.02%
Democratic	Leonard D. Ladner	4,697	2.55%
Total votes		183,348	100.00%

Republican Party primary
Party	Candidate	Votes	%
Republican	Lamar Alexander (Incumbent)	244,222	100.00%
Total votes		244,222	100.00%

Tennessee general
Party	Candidate	Votes	%	±%
Republican	Lamar Alexander (Incumbent)	1,579,477	65.14%	+10.87%
Democratic	Bob Tuke	767,236	31.64%	−12.69%
Independent	Edward L. Buck	31,631	1.30%	N/A
Independent	Christopher G. Fenner	11,073	0.46%	N/A
Independent	Daniel Towers Lewis	9,367	0.39%	N/A
Independent	Chris Lugo	9,170	0.38%	N/A
Independent	Ed Lawhorn	8,986	0.37%	N/A
Independent	David Gatchell	7,645	0.32%	N/A
Majority		812,241	33.50%	+23.56%
Turnout		2,424,585	66.34%	
Republican hold		Swing		

== Texas ==
Texas election
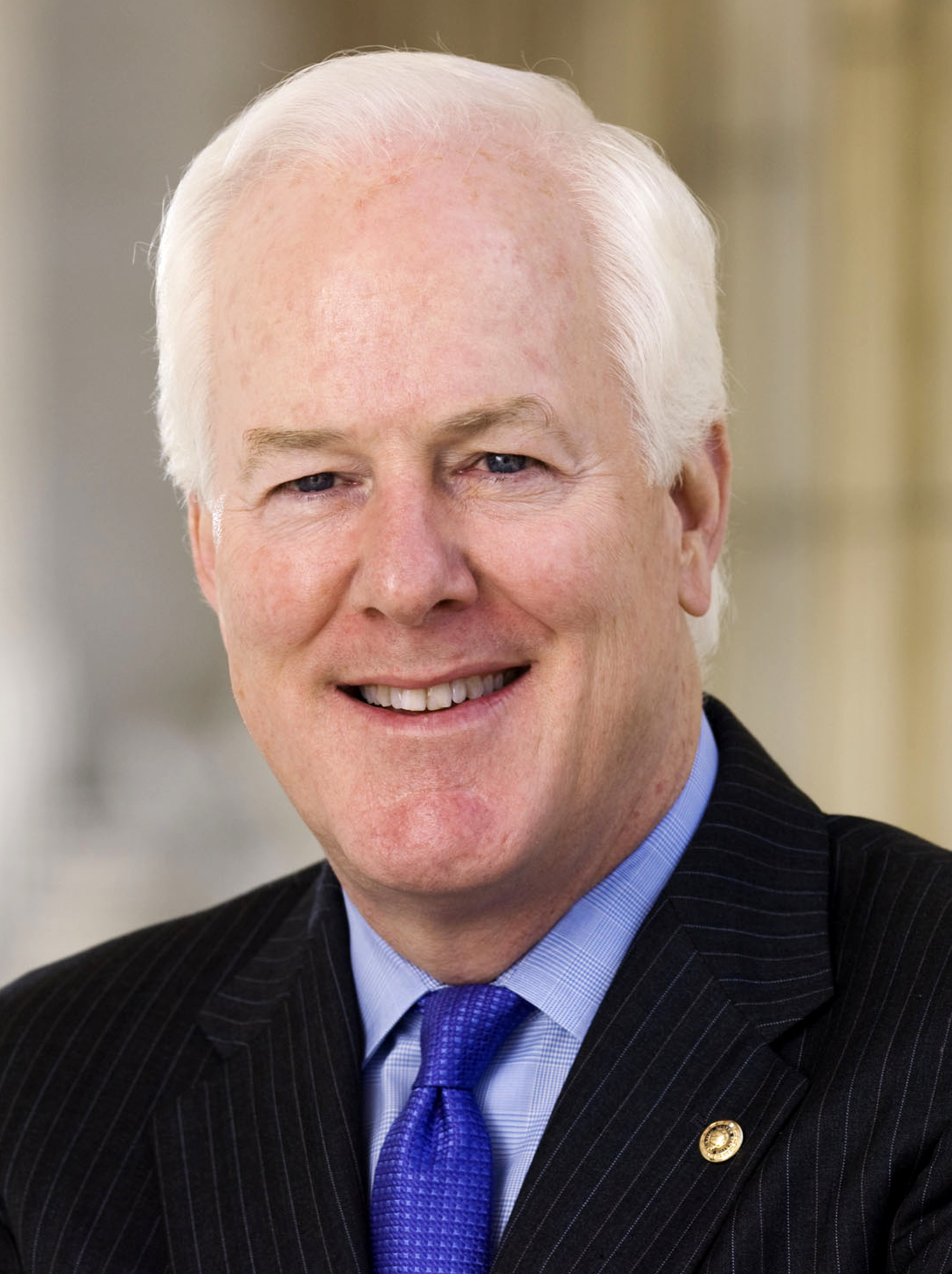

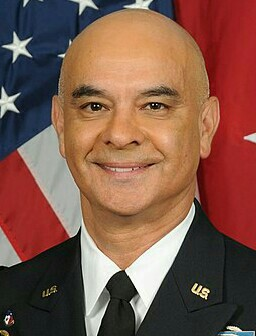
Nominee	John Cornyn	Rick Noriega
Party	Republican	Democratic
Popular vote	4,337,469	3,389,365
Percentage	54.8%	42.8%
- County results Cornyn: 50–60% 60–70% 70–80% 80–90% >90% Noriega: 40–50% 50–60% 60–70% 70–80% 80–90%
U.S. senator before election
John Cornyn
Republican
Elected U.S. senator
John Cornyn
Republican

Texas has not elected a Democrat in a statewide election since 1994, but according to pre-election Rasmussen polling, senator John Cornyn had an approval rating of 50%. Texas House of Representatives member and Afghanistan War veteran Rick Noriega secured his place as Cornyn's Democratic challenger in the March 4 primary, beating out opponents Gene Kelly, Ray McMurrey, and Rhett Smith. The same Rasmussen poll showed Cornyn leading Noriega by a narrow four percentage points - 47% to 43%.

Christian activist Larry Kilgore of Mansfield, Texas, was a Republican challenger for the March 2008 primary election, but Cornyn easily won the Republican primary.

There were three Libertarians, including 2006 LP senate nominee Scott Jameson, running for their party's nomination. In addition, the Green Party of Texas sought ballot access for its candidate David B. Collins.

In the end, John Cornyn won re-election, 55%-43%

Democratic primary
Party	Candidate	Votes	%
Democratic	Rick Noriega	1,110,579	51.01%
Democratic	Gene Kelly	584,966	26.87%
Democratic	Ray McMurrey	269,402	12.37%
Democratic	Rhett Smith	213,305	9.75%

Republican Primary
Party	Candidate	Votes	%	±%
Republican	John Cornyn (incumbent)	997,216	81.48%	+4.17%
Republican	Larry Kilgore	226,649	18.52%	+0.00%

2008 Texas U.S. Senate general election
Party	Candidate	Votes	%	±%
Republican	John Cornyn (incumbent)	4,337,469	54.82%	−0.48%
Democratic	Rick Noriega	3,389,365	42.83%	−0.50%
Libertarian	Yvonne Adams Schick	185,241	2.34%	+1.55%
Majority		948,104		
Turnout		7,912,075	58.28%	
Republican hold		Swing		

== Virginia ==
Virginia election
- Turnout: 67.0% (voting eligible)
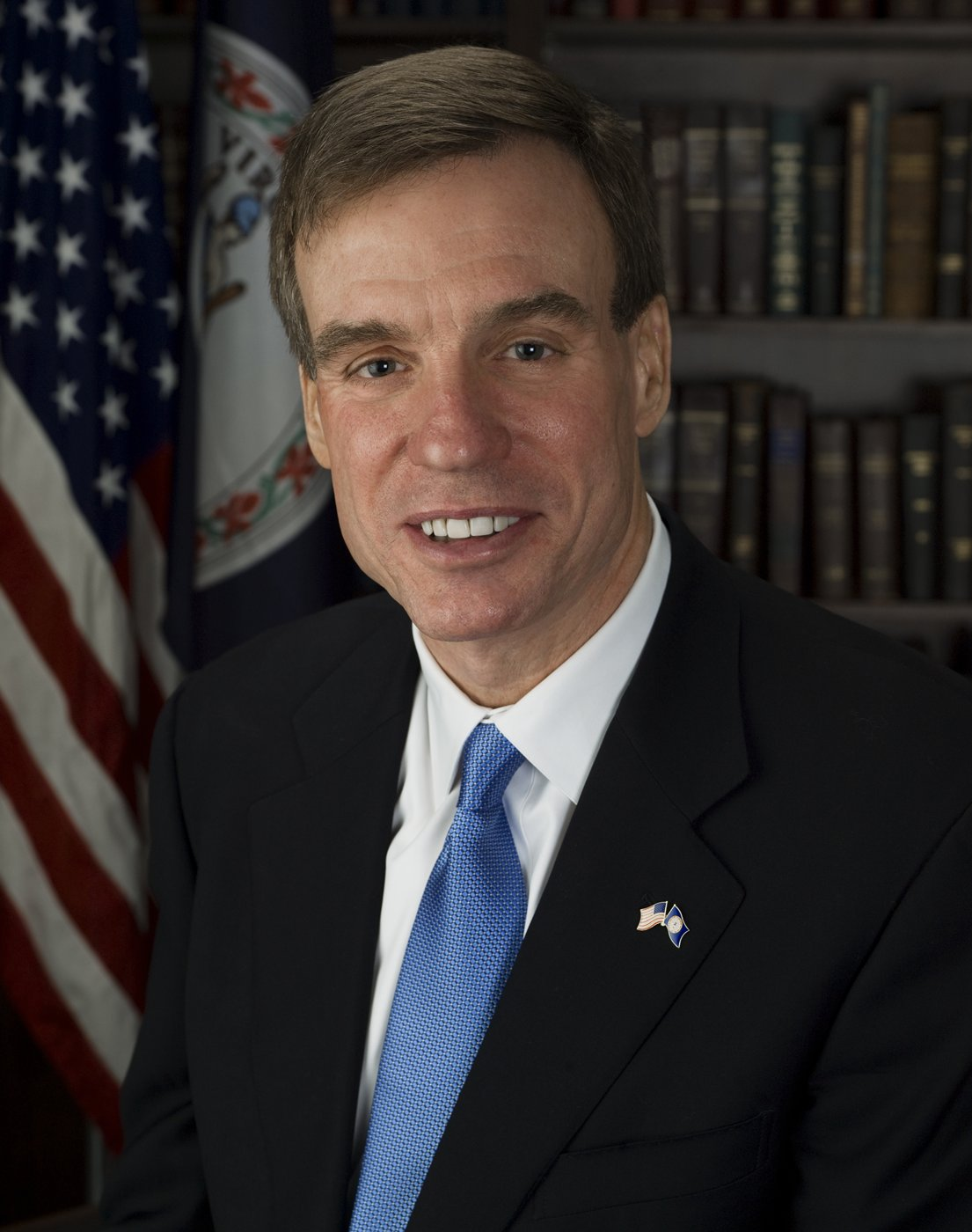

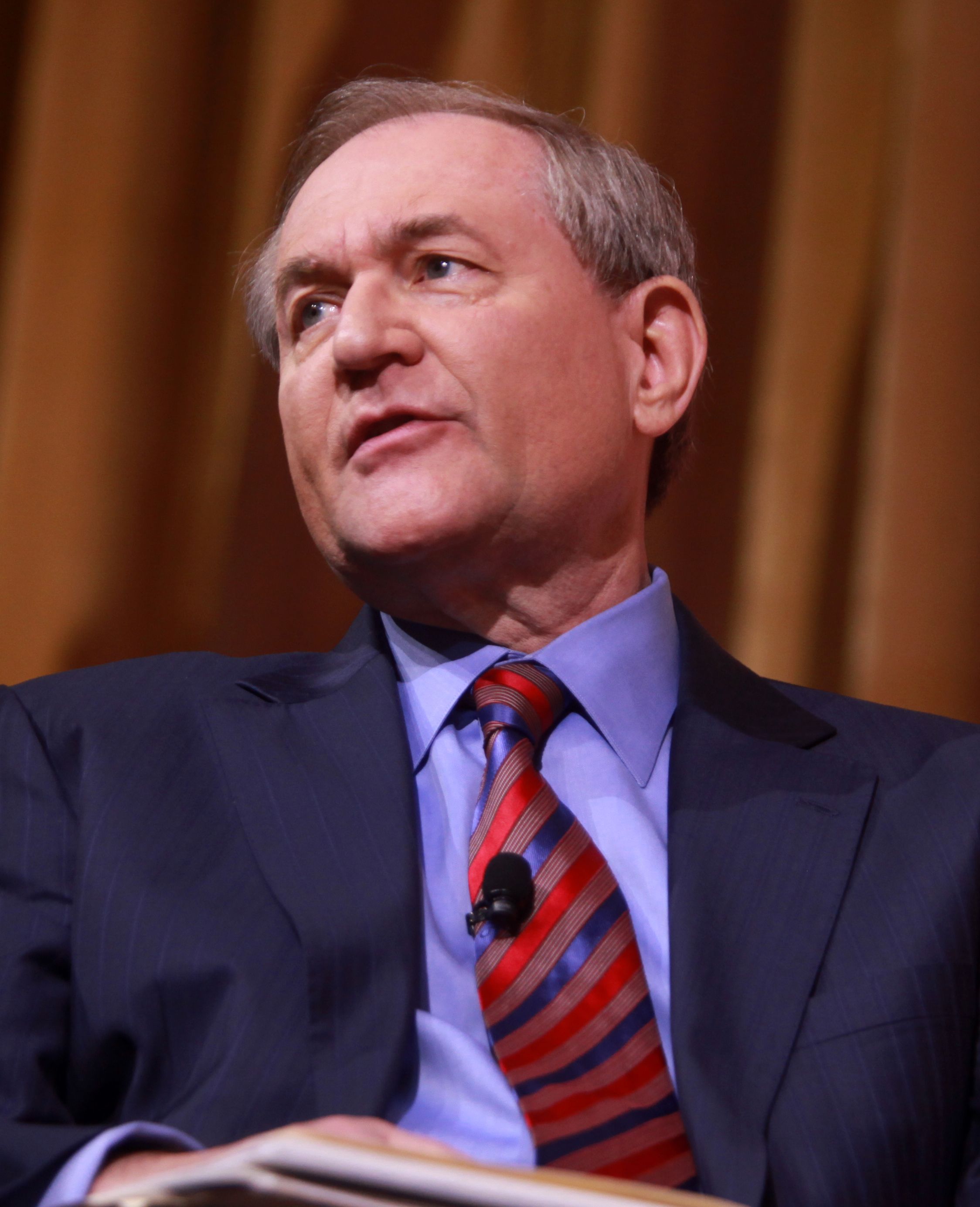
Nominee	Mark Warner	Jim Gilmore
Party	Democratic	Republican
Popular vote	2,369,327	1,228,830
Percentage	65.0%	33.7%
- Warner: 40–50% 50–60% 60–70% 70–80% 80–90% >90% Gilmore: 40–50% 50–60%
U.S. senator before election
John Warner
Republican
Elected U.S. senator
Mark Warner
Democratic

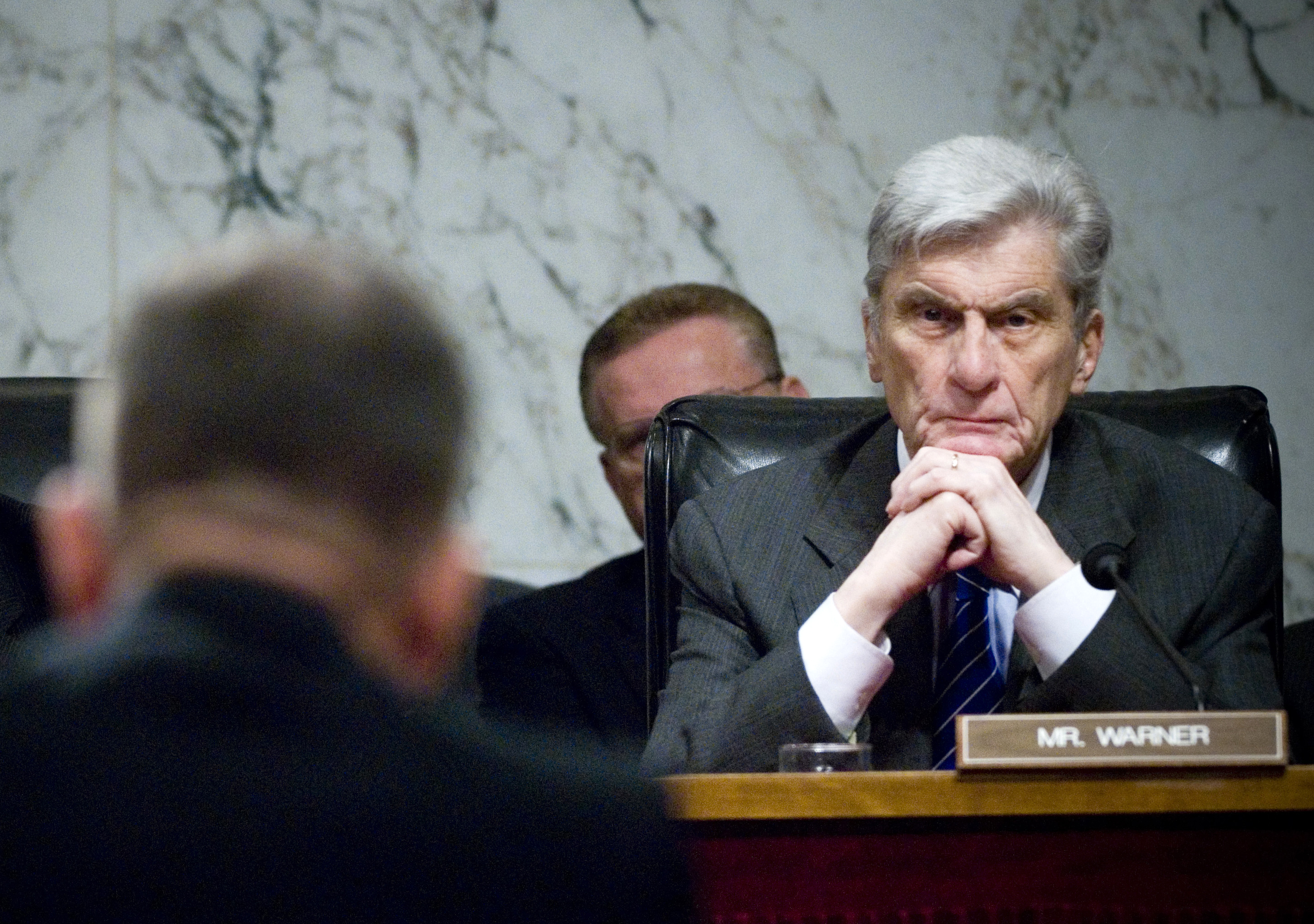
Republican senator John Warner chose to retire after five terms.

John Warner announced on August 31, 2007, that he would not seek re-election for another term. Former Governor Jim Gilmore, who dropped out of the 2008 presidential election, was the Republican nominee for the seat. Popular Democratic former Governor Mark Warner (no relation) was the Democratic nominee for the race. Polling showed him as a strong favorite to win the seat.

When asked whether the Republicans were abandoning their hopes of holding onto Warner's seat, senator John Ensign, the chairman of the National Republican Senatorial Committee, responded that "You don't waste money on races that don't need it or you can't win."

In one of the first senate races called on election day, Warner won, taking 65% of the vote, with Gilmore winning 34%. Since Democrat Jim Webb had defeated incumbent Republican George Allen for Virginia's other Senate seat in 2006, Virginia's senate delegation flipped from entirely Republican to entirely Democratic in just two years.

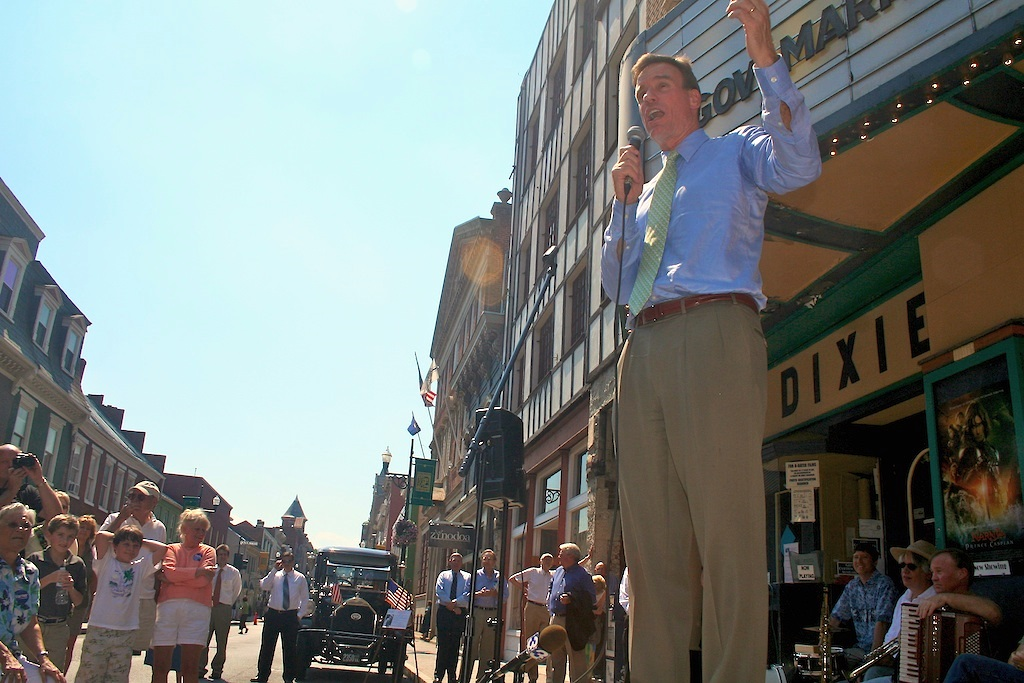
Former Gov. Mark Warner (D) campaigns at the Dixie Theatre in Staunton, Virginia

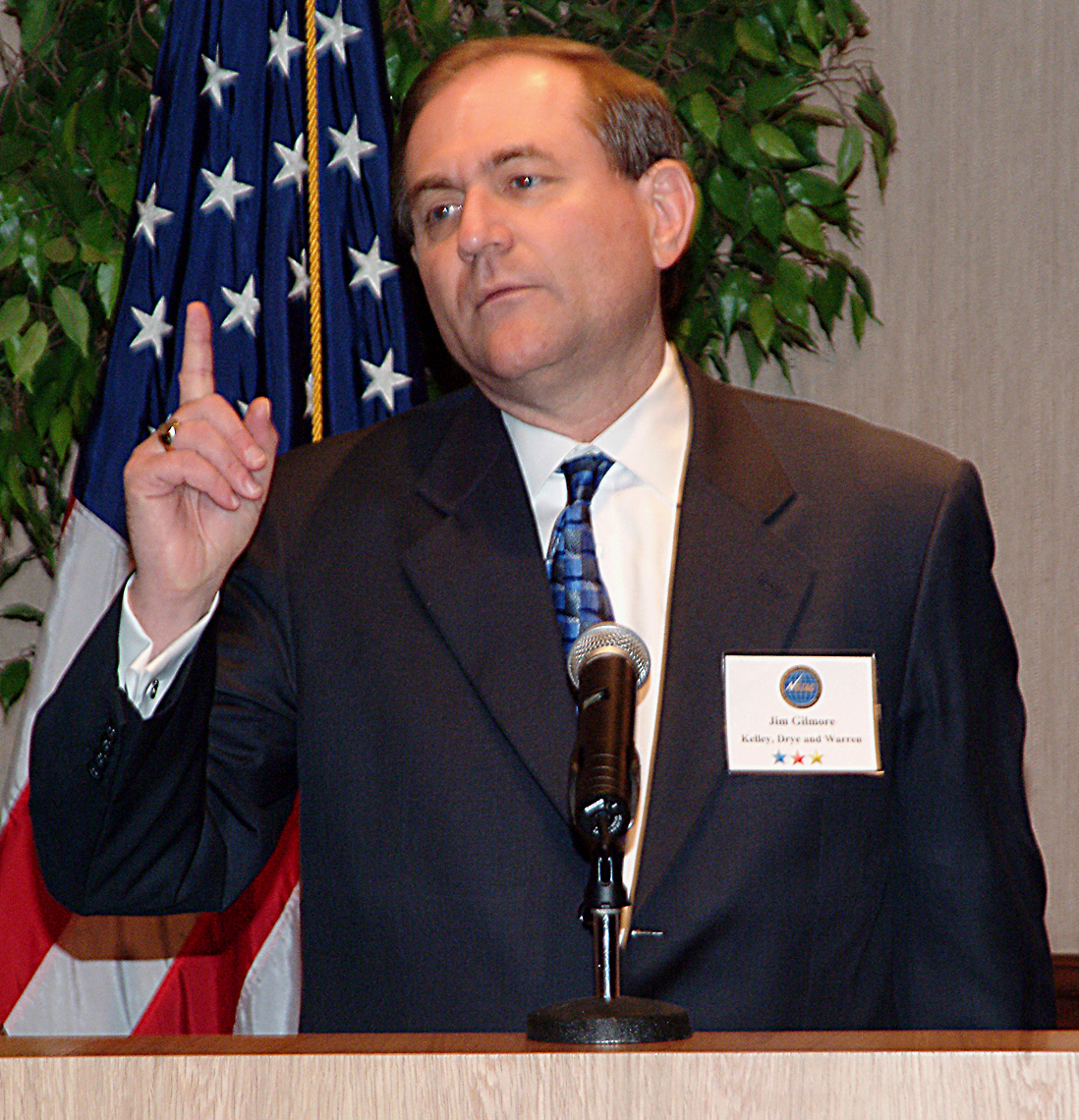
Former Gov. Jim Gilmore (R)

Virginia general
Party	Candidate	Votes	%	±%
Democratic	Mark Warner	2,369,327	65.03%	+65.03%
Republican	Jim Gilmore	1,228,830	33.72%	−48.85%
Independent Greens	Glenda Parker	21,690	0.60%	+0.60%
Libertarian	Bill Redpath	20,269	0.56%	+0.56%
Write-ins		3,178	0.09%	−0.47%
Majority		1,140,497	31.30%	−41.53%
Turnout		3,643,294		
Democratic gain from Republican		Swing		

== West Virginia ==
West Virginia election
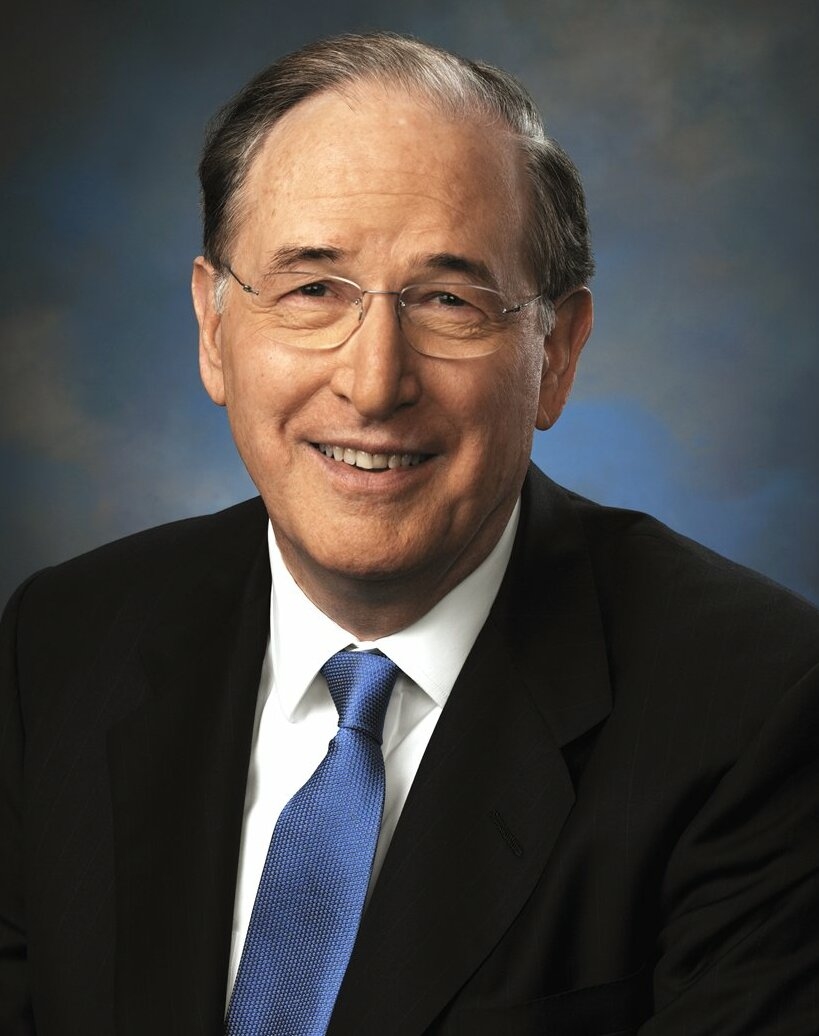

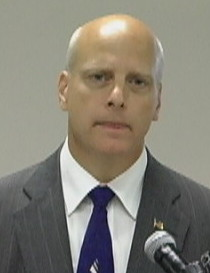
Nominee	Jay Rockefeller	Jay Wolfe
Party	Democratic	Republican
Popular vote	444,107	252,764
Percentage	63.7%	36.3%
- County results Rockefeller: 50–60% 60–70% 70–80% 80–90% Wolfe: 50–60% 60–70%
U.S. senator before election
Jay Rockefeller
Democratic
Elected U.S. senator
Jay Rockefeller
Democratic

Senator Jay Rockefeller, great-grandson of oil tycoon John D. Rockefeller, sought a fifth term representing West Virginia. Even though West Virginia is a historically Democratic state, in which the party had a 50-32% edge in party affiliation over the Republicans in the 2004 elections, the state party is more conservative than the national party, giving its votes to President George W. Bush in that election and in 2000. Democrats Sheirl Fletcher and Billy Hendricks challenged Rockefeller in the primary but were defeated. The Republican nominee was Jay Wolfe of Salem, a former State Senator.

Rockefeller handily won on election day, being re-elected with 64% of the vote. Wolfe had 36%.

2008 West Virginia U.S. Senate Democratic primary
Party	Candidate	Votes	%	±%
Democratic	Jay Rockefeller (Incumbent)	271,370	77.1%	
Democratic	Sheirl Fletcher	51,073	14.5%	
Democratic	Billy Hendricks	29,707	8.4%	
Turnout		352,150		

Republican primary
Party	Candidate	Votes	%	±%
Republican	Jay Wolfe	N/A	100.00%	
Turnout			100.00%	

West Virginia general
Party	Candidate	Votes	%	±%
Democratic	Jay Rockefeller (Incumbent)	447,560	63.7%	+0.6%
Republican	Jay Wolfe	254,629	36.3%	−0.6%
Majority		192,931		
Turnout		702,189		
Democratic hold		Swing		

== Wyoming ==
=== Wyoming (regular) ===
Wyoming election
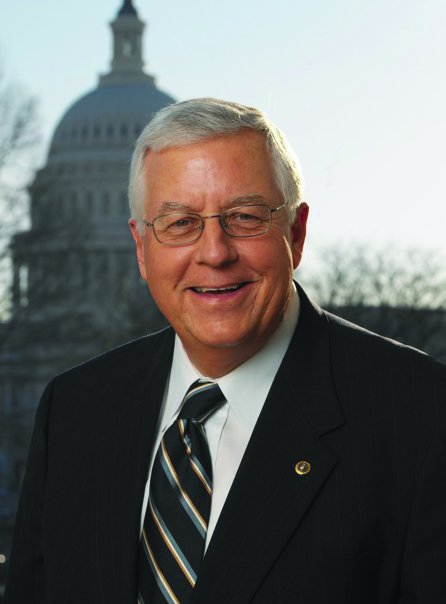

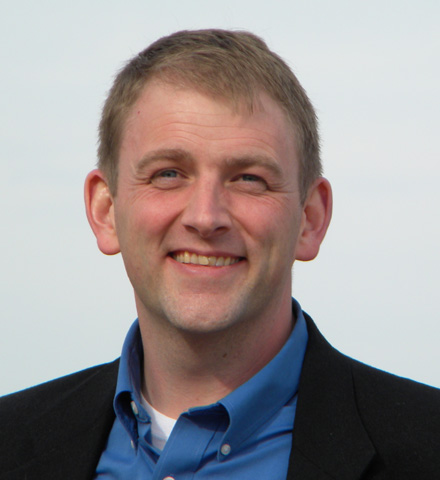
Nominee	Mike Enzi	Chris Rothfuss
Party	Republican	Democratic
Popular vote	189,046	60,631
Percentage	75.6%	24.3%
- County results Enzi: 50–60% 60–70% 70–80% 80–90%
U.S. senator before election
Mike Enzi
Republican
Elected U.S. senator
Mike Enzi
Republican

Incumbent Republican Mike Enzi was considered likely to be re-elected without significant opposition for a third term in strongly Republican Wyoming. His Democratic opponent was Chris Rothfuss, a professor at the University of Wyoming and a chemical engineer, nanotechnologist, and diplomat. Pre-election polling indicated that Enzi led Rothfuss by 24%.

Enzi won another term, 76%-24%.

Democratic primary
Party	Candidate	Votes	%
Democratic	Chris Rothfuss	14,221	62.38%
Democratic	Al Hamburg	8,578	37.62%
Total votes		22,799	100.00%

Republican primary
Party	Candidate	Votes	%
Republican	Mike Enzi (Incumbent)	69,195	100.00%
Total votes		69,195	100.00%

General election results
Party	Candidate	Votes	%	±%
Republican	Mike Enzi (incumbent)	189,046	75.63%	+2.68%
Democratic	Chris Rothfuss	60,631	24.26%	−2.79%
Write-ins		269	0.11%	
Majority		128,415	51.38%	+5.47%
Turnout		249,946		
Republican hold		Swing		

=== Wyoming (special) ===
Wyoming special election
- November 4, 2008
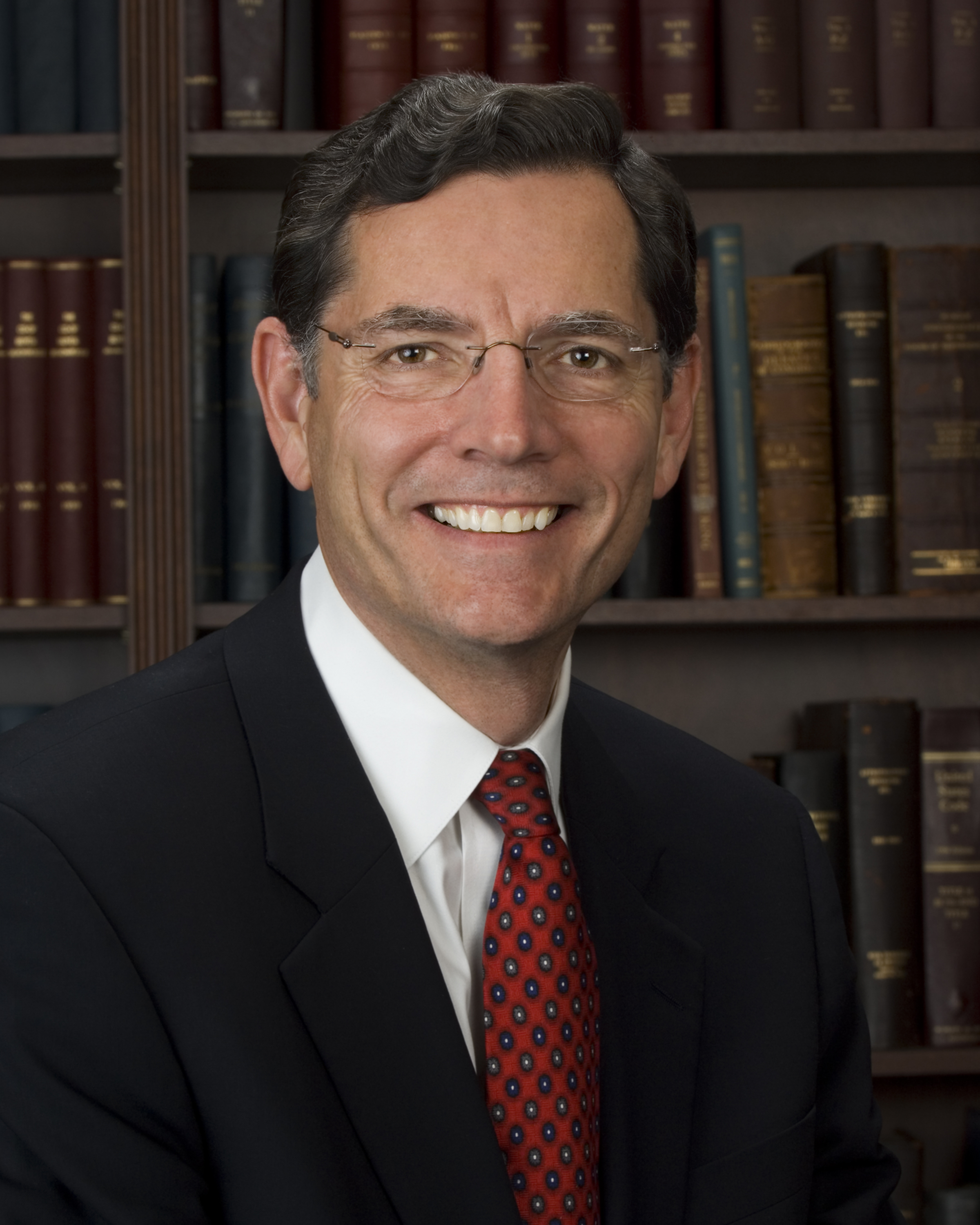

Nominee	John Barrasso	Nick Carter
Party	Republican	Democratic
Popular vote	183,063	66,202
Percentage	73.4%	26.5%
- County results Barrasso: 50–60% 60–70% 70–80% 80–90%
U.S. senator before election
John Barrasso
Republican
Elected U.S. senator
John Barrasso
Republican

Republican John Barrasso was appointed by Governor Dave Freudenthal (D) on June 22, 2007, to fill the senate seat of Republican Craig L. Thomas, who died on June 4. Wyoming law requires that the interim senator be affiliated with the same political party as the departed senator. Barrasso ran in the November 4, 2008, special election, held on the day of the 2008 presidential election, to serve out the remainder of Thomas's term, which expires in January 2013.

On the Democratic side, Casper City Councilman Keith Goodenough announced his candidacy. In the primary on August 19, Goodenough was defeated by a political newcomer, Gillette defense attorney Nick Carter, who became Barrasso's opponent in the general election.

Barrasso won on Election Day, taking 73% of the vote and winning every county in the state.

Democratic primary
Party	Candidate	Votes	%
Democratic	Nick Carter	12,316	50.68%
Democratic	Keith Goodenough	11,984	49.32%
Total votes		22,799	100.00%

Republican primary
Party	Candidate	Votes	%
Republican	John Barrasso (Incumbent)	68,194	100.00%
Total votes		68,194	100.00%

Wyoming special election
Party	Candidate	Votes	%	±%
Republican	John Barrasso (Incumbent)	183,063	73.35%	+3.37%
Democratic	Nick Carter	66,202	26.53%	−3.33%
None	Write-ins	293	0.12%	
Majority		116,861	46.83%	+6.70%
Turnout		249,558		
Republican hold		Swing		

== See also ==
- 2008 United States elections
  - 2008 United States gubernatorial elections
  - 2008 United States presidential election
  - 2008 United States House of Representatives elections
- 110th United States Congress
- 111th United States Congress
