= List of current United States senators =

Senate composition by state and party 2 Democrats 2 Republicans 1 Democrat and 1 Republican 1 Democrat and 1 Independent caucusing with Democrats 1 Republican and 1 Independent caucusing with Democrats

The United States Senate consists of 100 members, two from each of the 50 states. This list includes all senators serving in the 119th United States Congress.

As of July 2026, there are 53 Republican senators, 45 Democratic senators, and two independent senators who caucus with the Democrats. Sen. John Thune is the Senate majority leader, and Sen. Chuck Schumer is the Senate minority leader.

The 2026 United States Senate elections were recently held on November 3rd, 2026, in which a widely described "blue wave" flipped both chambers of Congress, including the Senate, to Democratic control. Nine seats were flipped from Republican to Democrat, and all 35 elected senators are set to take office on January 3rd, 2027.

== Party affiliation ==
Senate composition by party Democrats Republicans Independents caucusing with Democrats

Affiliation	Members
Republican Party	53
Democratic Party	45
Independent	2
Total	100

Independent senators Angus King of Maine and Bernie Sanders of Vermont caucus with the Democratic Party.

== Leadership ==
=== Presiding officers ===
Office	Party	Officer	State	Since
President of the Senate (Note: The vice president of the United States is the president of the Senate, but not a member of the Senate itself and does not have a vote, unless there is a tie on the Senate floor.)	Republican	JD Vance	OH (Note: As vice president, Vance does not represent a state in the Senate, but his home state is Ohio.)	January 20, 2025
President pro tempore	Republican	Chuck Grassley	IA	January 3, 2025; Party dean since January 3, 2019

=== Majority leadership (Republican) ===
Office	Officer	State	Since
Senate Majority Leader	John Thune	SD	January 3, 2025; Party leader since January 3, 2025
Senate Majority Whip	John Barrasso	WY	January 3, 2025; Party whip since January 3, 2025
Chair of the Senate Republican Conference	Tom Cotton	AR	January 3, 2025
Chair of the Senate Republican Policy Committee	Shelley Moore Capito	WV	January 3, 2025
Vice Chair of the Senate Republican Conference	James Lankford	OK	January 3, 2025
Chair of the National Republican Senatorial Committee	Tim Scott	SC	January 3, 2025
Chair of the Senate Republican Steering Committee	Rick Scott	FL	January 3, 2025
Senate Republican Chief Deputy Whip	Mike Crapo	ID	January 3, 2013
Chair of the Senate Republican Committee on Committees	Mike Crapo	ID	January 3, 2003

=== Minority leadership (Democratic) ===
Office	Officer	State	Since
Senate Minority Leader; Chair of the Senate Democratic Caucus	Chuck Schumer	NY	January 3, 2025; Party leader since January 3, 2017
Senate Minority Whip	Dick Durbin	IL	January 3, 2025; Party whip since January 3, 2005
Chair of the Senate Democratic Steering and Policy Committee	Amy Klobuchar	MN	January 3, 2025
Chair of the Senate Democratic Strategic Communications Committee	Cory Booker	NJ	January 3, 2025
Vice Chairs of the Senate Democratic Caucus	Mark Warner	VA	January 3, 2017
Vice Chairs of the Senate Democratic Caucus	Elizabeth Warren	MA	January 3, 2017
Chair of Senate Democratic Outreach	Bernie Sanders	VT	January 3, 2017
Secretary of the Senate Democratic Caucus	Tammy Baldwin	WI	January 3, 2017
Chair of the Democratic Senatorial Campaign Committee	Kirsten Gillibrand	NY	January 3, 2025
Vice Chair of Senate Democratic Outreach	Catherine Cortez Masto	NV	January 3, 2021
Deputy Secretaries of the Senate Democratic Caucus	Chris Murphy	CT	January 3, 2025
Deputy Secretaries of the Senate Democratic Caucus	Brian Schatz	HI	January 3, 2023
Senate Democratic Chief Deputy Whip	Brian Schatz	HI	January 3, 2025
President pro tempore emerita	Patty Murray	WA	January 3, 2025; Party dean since September 29, 2023

== List of senators ==
State	Portrait	Senator	Party	Born	Occupation(s)	Previous elective office(s)	Education	Assumed office	Class	Residence	Length of service
Alabama		Tommy Tuberville	Republican	September 18, 1954 (age 72)	Investment management firm partner College football coach	None	Southern Arkansas University (BS)	January 3, 2021	2026; Class 2	Auburn	5 years, 321 days
Alabama		Katie Britt	Republican	February 2, 1982 (age 44)	Business Council of Alabama President and CEO Campaign manager Lawyer University administrator Senate staffer	None	University of Alabama (BS, JD)	January 3, 2023	2028; Class 3	Montgomery	3 years, 321 days
Alaska		Lisa Murkowski	Republican	May 22, 1957 (age 69)	Lawyer	Alaska House of Representatives	Georgetown University (AB) Willamette University (JD)	December 20, 2002 (Note: Appointed to the seat following the resignation of her father Frank Murkowski, who was elected Governor of Alaska.)	2028; Class 3	Girdwood	23 years, 335 days
Alaska		Dan Sullivan	Republican	November 13, 1964 (age 62)	Assistant Secretary of State for Economic and Business Affairs Lawyer U.S. Marine Corps officer	Alaska Attorney General	Harvard University (AB) Georgetown University (MS, JD)	January 3, 2015	2026; Class 2	Anchorage	11 years, 321 days
Arizona		Mark Kelly	Democratic	February 21, 1964 (age 62)	Giffords Law Center to Prevent Gun Violence Co-founder NASA astronaut U.S. Navy officer	None	United States Merchant Marine Academy (BS) Naval Postgraduate School (MS)	December 2, 2020 (Note: Elected to the seat to succeed Martha McSally, who had been appointed to the seat following the death of John McCain and the resignation of Jon Kyl.)	2028; Class 3	Tucson	5 years, 353 days
Arizona		Ruben Gallego	Democratic	November 20, 1979 (age 47)	Political strategist Public relations project manager Chief of Staff to Phoenix City Councilman U.S. Marine Corps	U.S. House Arizona House	Harvard University (BA)	January 3, 2025	2030; Class 1	Phoenix	1 year, 321 days
Arkansas		John Boozman	Republican	December 10, 1950 (age 75)	Optometrist	U.S. House Rogers Public Schools Board	University of Arkansas Southern College of Optometry (OD)	January 3, 2011	2028; Class 3	Rogers	15 years, 321 days
Arkansas		Tom Cotton	Republican	May 13, 1977 (age 49)	Lawyer United States Army officer	U.S. House	Harvard University (AB, JD)	January 3, 2015	2026; Class 2	Little Rock	11 years, 321 days
California		Alex Padilla	Democratic	March 22, 1973 (age 53)	Engineer	Secretary of State of California California Senate Los Angeles City Council President	Massachusetts Institute of Technology (BS)	January 20, 2021 (Note: Appointed to the seat following the resignation of Kamala Harris, who had become Vice President of the United States.)	2028; Class 3	Los Angeles	5 years, 304 days
California		Adam Schiff	Democratic	June 22, 1960 (age 66)	Assistant Prosecutor for the United States Attorney for the Southern District of California Lawyer	U.S. House California Senate	Stanford University (BA) Harvard University (JD)	December 8, 2024 (Note: Elected to the seat to succeed Laphonza Butler, who had been appointed to the seat following the death of Dianne Feinstein.)	2030; Class 1	Burbank	1 year, 347 days
Colorado		Michael Bennet	Democratic	November 28, 1964 (age 61)	Chief of staff to the Mayor of Denver Denver Public Schools Superintendent Investment company executive Lawyer	None	Wesleyan University (BA) Yale University (JD)	January 21, 2009 (Note: Appointed to the seat following the resignation of Ken Salazar, who had become Secretary of the Interior.)	2028; Class 3	Denver	17 years, 303 days
Colorado		John Hickenlooper	Democratic	February 7, 1952 (age 74)	Businessman Geologist	Governor of Colorado Mayor of Denver	Wesleyan University (BA, MS)	January 3, 2021	2026; Class 2	Denver	5 years, 321 days
Connecticut		Richard Blumenthal	Democratic	February 13, 1946 (age 80)	U.S. Attorney Lawyer Senate staffer Marine Corps Reserve Sergeant	Connecticut Attorney General Connecticut Senate Connecticut House of Representatives	Harvard University (AB) Trinity College, Cambridge Yale University (JD)	January 3, 2011	2028; Class 3	Greenwich	15 years, 321 days
Connecticut		Chris Murphy	Democratic	August 3, 1973 (age 53)	Political campaign manager Lawyer	U.S. House Connecticut Senate Connecticut House of Representatives	Williams College (BA) Exeter College, Oxford University of Connecticut (JD)	January 3, 2013	2030; Class 1	Hartford	13 years, 321 days
Delaware		Chris Coons	Democratic	September 9, 1963 (age 63)	Nonprofit organization executive Lawyer	New Castle County Executive New Castle County Council	Amherst College (BA) Yale University (MAR, JD)	November 15, 2010 (Note: Elected to the seat to succeed Ted Kaufman, who had been appointed to the seat following the resignation of Joe Biden, who had become Vice President of the United States.)	2026; Class 2	Wilmington	16 years, 5 days
Delaware		Lisa Blunt Rochester	Democratic	February 10, 1962 (age 64)	Nonprofit executive Consultant Delaware Personnel Director Delaware Secretary of Labor Delaware Deputy Secretary of Health and Social Services	U.S. House	Villanova University Fairleigh Dickinson University (BA) University of Delaware (MA)	January 3, 2025	2030; Class 1	Wilmington	1 year, 321 days
Florida		Rick Scott	Republican	December 1, 1952 (age 73)	Venture capitalist Columbia/HCA CEO Lawyer U.S. Navy	Governor of Florida	University of Missouri-Kansas City (BS) Southern Methodist University (JD)	January 8, 2019 (Note: Inauguration delayed in order to finish his term as Governor of Florida.)	2030; Class 1	Naples	7 years, 316 days
Florida		Ashley Moody	Republican	March 28, 1975 (age 51)	Assistant U.S. attorney for the Middle District of Florida Professor Lawyer	Florida Attorney General Judge of the Thirteenth Judicial Circuit Court of Florida	University of Florida (BS, MS, JD) Stetson University (LLM)	January 21, 2025 (Note: Appointed to the seat following Marco Rubio's confirmation as Secretary of State.)	2026; Class 3 (Note: While elections for full class 3 terms will take place in 2028, Florida will hold a special election in 2026 to elect a senator to complete the remainder of Marco Rubio's term.)	Tampa	1 year, 303 days
Georgia		Jon Ossoff	Democratic	February 16, 1987 (age 39)	Investigative journalist Documentary film producer U.S. House staffer	None	Georgetown University (BS) London School of Economics (MSc)	January 20, 2021 (Note: Inauguration delayed as incumbent senator David Perdue's term expired on January 3, 2021, two days prior to the runoff election.)	2026; Class 2	Atlanta	5 years, 304 days
Georgia		Raphael Warnock	Democratic	July 23, 1969 (age 57)	Pastor	None	Morehouse College (BA) Union Theological Seminary (MDiv, MPhil, PhD)	January 20, 2021 (Note: Elected to the seat to succeed Kelly Loeffler, who had been appointed to the seat following the resignation of Johnny Isakson.)	2028; Class 3	Atlanta	5 years, 304 days
Hawaii		Brian Schatz	Democratic	October 20, 1972 (age 54)	Nonprofit organization executive Teacher	Lieutenant Governor of Hawaii Hawaii House of Representatives	Pomona College (BA)	December 26, 2012 (Note: Appointed to the seat following the death of Daniel Inouye.)	2028; Class 3	Honolulu	13 years, 329 days
Hawaii		Mazie Hirono	Democratic	November 3, 1947 (age 79)	Lawyer	U.S. House Lieutenant Governor of Hawaii Hawaii House of Representatives	University of Hawaii at Manoa (BA) Georgetown University (JD)	January 3, 2013	2030; Class 1	Honolulu	13 years, 321 days
Idaho		Mike Crapo	Republican	May 20, 1951 (age 75)	Lawyer	U.S. House Idaho Senate	Brigham Young University (BA) Harvard University (JD)	January 3, 1999	2028; Class 3	Idaho Falls	27 years, 321 days
Idaho		Jim Risch	Republican	May 3, 1943 (age 83)	Nonprofit organization executive Professor Lawyer Rancher	Governor of Idaho Lieutenant Governor of Idaho Idaho Senate President pro tempore Ada County Prosecuting Attorney	University of Wisconsin-Milwaukee University of Idaho (BS, JD)	January 3, 2009	2026; Class 2	Boise	17 years, 321 days
Illinois		Dick Durbin	Democratic	November 21, 1944 (age 81)	Professor Lawyer	U.S. House	Georgetown University (BS, JD)	January 3, 1997	2026; Class 2	Springfield	29 years, 321 days
Illinois		Tammy Duckworth	Democratic	March 12, 1968 (age 58)	Illinois Director of Veterans Affairs U.S. Assistant Secretary of Veterans Affairs Center for Nursing Research at Northern Illinois University Coordinator Army National Guard officer	U.S. House	University of Hawaiʻi–Mānoa (BA) George Washington University (MA) Northern Illinois University Capella University (PhD)	January 3, 2017	2028; Class 3	Hoffman Estates	9 years, 321 days
Indiana		Todd Young	Republican	August 24, 1972 (age 54)	Management consultant Professor Lawyer U.S. Marine Corps officer	U.S. House	United States Naval Academy (BS) University of Chicago (MBA) University of London (MA) Indiana University, Indianapolis (JD)	January 3, 2017	2028; Class 3	Bargersville	9 years, 321 days
Indiana		Jim Banks	Republican	July 16, 1979 (age 47)	Real estate broker U.S. Navy Reserve Business development director Campaign manager U.S. House staffer	U.S. House Indiana Senate Whitley County Council	Indiana University Bloomington (BA) Grace College & Seminary (MBA)	January 3, 2025	2030; Class 1	Columbia City	1 year, 321 days
Iowa		Chuck Grassley	Republican	September 17, 1933 (age 93)	Farmer	U.S. House Iowa House of Representatives	University of Northern Iowa (BA, MA) University of Iowa	January 3, 1981	2028; Class 3	New Hartford	45 years, 321 days
Iowa		Joni Ernst	Republican	July 1, 1970 (age 56)	Army National Guard officer	Iowa Senate Montgomery County Auditor	Iowa State University (BA) Columbus State University (MPA)	January 3, 2015	2026; Class 2	Red Oak	11 years, 321 days
Kansas		Jerry Moran	Republican	May 29, 1954 (age 72)	Lawyer Banker	U.S. House Kansas Senate	Fort Hays State University University of Kansas (BA, JD)	January 3, 2011	2028; Class 3	Manhattan	15 years, 321 days
Kansas		Roger Marshall	Republican	August 9, 1960 (age 66)	Doctor U.S. Army Reserve officer	U.S. House	Kansas State University (BS) University of Kansas (MD)	January 3, 2021	2026; Class 2	Great Bend	5 years, 321 days
Kentucky		Mitch McConnell	Republican	February 20, 1942 (age 84)	Assistant Attorney General for the U.S. Department of Justice Office of Legislative Affairs U.S. Senate staff member Lawyer	Jefferson County Judge/Executive	University of Louisville (BA) University of Kentucky (JD)	January 3, 1985	2026; Class 2	Louisville	41 years, 321 days
Kentucky		Rand Paul	Republican	January 7, 1963 (age 63)	Physician specializing in Ophthalmology	None	Baylor University Duke University (MD)	January 3, 2011	2028; Class 3	Bowling Green	15 years, 321 days
Louisiana		Bill Cassidy	Republican	September 28, 1957 (age 69)	Physician	U.S. House Louisiana Senate	Louisiana State University (BS, MD)	January 3, 2015	2026; Class 2	Baton Rouge	11 years, 321 days
Louisiana		John Kennedy	Republican	November 21, 1951 (age 74)	Secretary of the Louisiana Department of Revenue Staff of Louisiana Governor Buddy Roemer Professor Lawyer	Louisiana State Treasurer	Vanderbilt University (BA) University of Virginia (JD) Magdalen College, Oxford (BCL)	January 3, 2017	2028; Class 3	Madisonville	9 years, 321 days
Maine		Susan Collins	Republican	December 7, 1952 (age 73)	Deputy Treasurer of Massachusetts Small Business Administration Regional Director Senate staffer House staffer	None	St. Lawrence University (BA)	January 3, 1997	2026; Class 2	Bangor	29 years, 321 days
Maine		Angus King	Independent (Note: Angus King of Maine and Bernie Sanders of Vermont join meetings of the Senate Democratic Caucus.)	March 31, 1944 (age 82)	Corporate executive Entrepreneur Public television news program host Senate staffer Lawyer	Governor of Maine	Dartmouth College (BA) University of Virginia (JD)	January 3, 2013	2030; Class 1	Brunswick	13 years, 321 days
Maryland		Chris Van Hollen	Democratic	January 10, 1959 (age 67)	Maryland Governor's legislative advisor U.S. Senate staff member Lawyer	U.S. House Maryland Senate Maryland House of Delegates	Swarthmore College (BA) Harvard University (MPP) Georgetown University (JD)	January 3, 2017	2028; Class 3	Kensington	9 years, 321 days
Maryland		Angela Alsobrooks	Democratic	February 23, 1971 (age 55)	Executive Director of the Prince George's County Revenue Authority Education liaison to the Prince George's County Executive Assistant Prince George's State's Attorney	Prince George's County Executive Prince George's State's Attorney	Duke University (BA) University of Maryland, Baltimore (JD)	January 3, 2025	2030; Class 1	Upper Marlboro	1 year, 321 days
Massachusetts		Elizabeth Warren	Democratic	June 22, 1949 (age 77)	CFPB Special Advisor COP Chair Nonprofit organization executive Research associate Professor Lawyer	None	George Washington University University of Houston (BS) Rutgers University (JD)	January 3, 2013	2030; Class 1	Cambridge	13 years, 321 days
Massachusetts		Ed Markey	Democratic	July 11, 1946 (age 80)	Lawyer United States Army Reserve	U.S. House Massachusetts House of Representatives	Boston College (BA, JD)	July 16, 2013 (Note: Elected to the seat to succeed Mo Cowan, who had been appointed to the seat following the resignation of John Kerry, who had become Secretary of State.)	2026; Class 2	Malden	13 years, 127 days
Michigan		Gary Peters	Democratic	December 1, 1958 (age 67)	College professor and lecturer Lawyer Financial advisor U.S. Navy Reserve Officer	U.S. House Michigan Senate	Alma College (BA) University of Detroit (MBA) Wayne State University (JD, MA) Michigan State University (MA)	January 3, 2015	2026; Class 2	Bloomfield Hills	11 years, 321 days
Michigan		Elissa Slotkin	Democratic	July 10, 1976 (age 50)	Consultant Assistant Secretary of Defense for International Security Affairs CIA analyst Department of State political affairs officer	U.S. House	Cornell University (BA) Columbia University (MIA)	January 3, 2025	2030; Class 1	Holly	1 year, 321 days
Minnesota		Amy Klobuchar	Democratic (DFL) (Note: The Minnesota Democratic–Farmer–Labor Party (DFL) is the Minnesota affiliate of the U.S. Democratic Party and its members are counted as Democrats.)	May 25, 1960 (age 66)	Lawyer	Hennepin County Attorney	Yale University (BA) University of Chicago (JD)	January 3, 2007	2030; Class 1	Minneapolis	19 years, 321 days
Minnesota		Tina Smith	Democratic (DFL)	March 4, 1958 (age 68)	Chief of staff to the Governor of Minnesota Chief of staff to the Mayor of Minneapolis Political campaign manager Public relations consultant	Lieutenant Governor of Minnesota	Stanford University (BA) Dartmouth College (MBA)	January 3, 2018 (Note: Appointed to the seat following the resignation of Al Franken.)	2026; Class 2	Minneapolis	8 years, 322 days
Mississippi		Roger Wicker	Republican	July 5, 1951 (age 75)	U.S. Air Force officer/Judge Advocate Lawyer U.S. House staffer	U.S. House Mississippi Senate	University of Mississippi (BA, JD)	December 31, 2007 (Note: Appointed to the seat following the resignation of Trent Lott.)	2030; Class 1	Tupelo	18 years, 324 days
Mississippi		Cindy Hyde-Smith	Republican	May 10, 1959 (age 67)	Lobbyist	Mississippi Commissioner of Agriculture and Commerce Mississippi Senate	Copiah-Lincoln Community College (AA) University of Southern Mississippi (BA)	April 9, 2018 (Note: Appointed to the seat following the resignation of Thad Cochran.)	2026; Class 2	Brookhaven	8 years, 225 days
Missouri	Josh Hawley, official portrait, 116th congress (cropped)	Josh Hawley	Republican	December 31, 1979 (age 46)	Lawyer U.S. Supreme Court law clerk Professor	Missouri Attorney General	Stanford University (BA) Yale University (JD)	January 3, 2019	2030; Class 1	Ozark	7 years, 321 days
Missouri		Eric Schmitt	Republican	June 20, 1975 (age 51)	Lawyer	Missouri Attorney General State Treasurer of Missouri Missouri Senate Glendale Board of Aldermen	Truman State University (BA) Saint Louis University (JD)	January 3, 2023	2028; Class 3	Glendale	3 years, 321 days
Montana		Steve Daines	Republican	August 20, 1962 (age 64)	Businessman	U.S. House	Montana State University (BS)	January 3, 2015	2026; Class 2	Belgrade	11 years, 321 days
Montana		Tim Sheehy	Republican	November 18, 1985 (age 41)	Businessman U.S. Navy	None	United States Naval Academy (BS)	January 3, 2025	2030; Class 1	Bozeman	1 year, 321 days
Nebraska		Deb Fischer	Republican	March 1, 1951 (age 75)	Rancher	Nebraska Legislature	University of Nebraska–Lincoln (BS)	January 3, 2013	2030; Class 1	Lincoln	13 years, 321 days
Nebraska		Pete Ricketts	Republican	August 19, 1964 (age 62)	Businessman	Governor of Nebraska	University of Chicago (BA, MBA)	January 12, 2023 (Note: Appointed to the seat on January 12, 2023 following the resignation of Ben Sasse.)	2026; Class 2	Omaha	3 years, 312 days
Nevada		Catherine Cortez Masto	Democratic	March 29, 1964 (age 62)	Executive vice chancellor, Nevada System of Higher Education Assistant U.S. Attorney U.S. Senate Staffer Lawyer	Nevada Attorney General	University of Nevada, Reno (BS) Gonzaga University (JD)	January 3, 2017	2028; Class 3	Las Vegas	9 years, 321 days
Nevada		Jacky Rosen	Democratic	August 2, 1957 (age 69)	Software developer, designer, and consultant Computer programmer	U.S. House	University of Minnesota (BA) Clark County Community College (AAS)	January 3, 2019	2030; Class 1	Henderson	7 years, 321 days
New Hampshire		Jeanne Shaheen	Democratic	January 28, 1947 (age 79)	Entrepreneur Teacher	Governor of New Hampshire New Hampshire Senate	Shippensburg University (BA) University of Mississippi (MSS)	January 3, 2009	2026; Class 2	Madbury	17 years, 321 days
New Hampshire		Maggie Hassan	Democratic	February 27, 1958 (age 68)	Lawyer	Governor of New Hampshire New Hampshire Senate	Brown University (BA) Northeastern University (JD)	January 3, 2017	2028; Class 3	Newfields	9 years, 321 days
New Jersey		Cory Booker	Democratic	April 27, 1969 (age 57)	Lawyer	Mayor of Newark Newark Municipal Council	Stanford University (BA, MA) The Queen's College, Oxford (MA) Yale University (JD)	October 31, 2013 (Note: Elected to the seat to succeed Jeffrey Chiesa, who had been appointed to the seat following the death of Frank Lautenberg.)	2026; Class 2	Newark	13 years, 20 days
New Jersey		Andy Kim	Democratic	July 12, 1982 (age 44)	National Security Council Director for Iraq Iraq Country Director for the Office of the Secretary of Defense U.S. State Department foreign affairs officer	U.S. House	Deep Springs College University of Chicago (BA) Magdalen College, Oxford (MPhil, DPhil)	December 8, 2024 (Note: Elected to the seat to succeed George Helmy, who had been appointed to the seat following the resignation of Bob Menendez.)	2030; Class 1	Moorestown	1 year, 347 days
New Mexico		Martin Heinrich	Democratic	October 17, 1971 (age 55)	Nonprofit organization executive Public relations consultant	U.S. House Albuquerque City Council	University of Missouri (BS)	January 3, 2013	2030; Class 1	Albuquerque	13 years, 321 days
New Mexico		Ben Ray Luján	Democratic	June 7, 1972 (age 54)	New Mexico Deputy State Treasurer New Mexico Cultural Affairs Department Director of Administrative Services and Chief Financial Officer	U.S. House New Mexico Public Regulation Commission	New Mexico Highlands University (BBA)	January 3, 2021	2026; Class 2	Nambé	5 years, 321 days
New York		Chuck Schumer	Democratic	November 23, 1950 (age 75)	Lawyer	U.S. House New York State Assembly	Harvard University (AB, JD)	January 3, 1999	2028; Class 3	Brooklyn	27 years, 321 days
New York		Kirsten Gillibrand	Democratic	December 9, 1966 (age 59)	U.S. HUD special counsel Lawyer	U.S. House	Dartmouth College (BA) University of California, Los Angeles (JD)	January 26, 2009 (Note: Appointed to the seat following the resignation of Hillary Clinton, who had become Secretary of State.)	2030; Class 1	Albany	17 years, 298 days
North Carolina		Thom Tillis	Republican	August 30, 1960 (age 66)	Business consultant	Speaker of the North Carolina House of Representatives	University of Maryland University College (BS)	January 3, 2015	2026; Class 2	Huntersville	11 years, 321 days
North Carolina		Ted Budd	Republican	October 21, 1971 (age 55)	Businessman	U.S. House	Appalachian State University (BSBA) Dallas Theological Seminary (ThM) Wake Forest University (MBA)	January 3, 2023	2028; Class 3	Advance	3 years, 321 days
North Dakota		John Hoeven	Republican	March 13, 1957 (age 69)	Banker 12th President of the Bank of North Dakota	Governor of North Dakota	Dartmouth College (BA) Northwestern University (MBA)	January 3, 2011	2028; Class 3	Bismarck	15 years, 321 days
North Dakota		Kevin Cramer	Republican	January 21, 1961 (age 65)	North Dakota Republican Party Chairman State Economic Development and Finance Director State Tourism Director	U.S. House North Dakota Public Service Commissioner	Concordia College (BA) University of Mary (MA)	January 3, 2019	2030; Class 1	Bismarck	7 years, 321 days
Ohio		Bernie Moreno	Republican	February 14, 1967 (age 59)	Businessman	None	University of Michigan (BBA)	January 3, 2025	2030; Class 1	Westlake	1 year, 321 days
Ohio		Jon Husted	Republican	August 25, 1967 (age 59)	Vice-President of Business and Economic Development at the Dayton-Area Chamber of Commerce Broadcaster Public relations executive Montgomery County Commission staffer	Lieutenant Governor of Ohio Secretary of State of Ohio Ohio Senate Speaker of the Ohio House of Representatives	University of Dayton (BA, MA)	January 21, 2025 (Note: Appointed to the seat following the resignation of JD Vance, who had become Vice President of the United States.)	2026; Class 3 (Note: While elections for full class 3 terms will take place in 2028, Ohio will hold a special election in 2026 to elect a senator to complete the remainder of JD Vance's term.)	Upper Arlington	1 year, 303 days
Oklahoma		James Lankford	Republican	March 4, 1968 (age 58)	Nonprofit program director Teacher	U.S. House	University of Texas, Austin (BS) Southwestern Baptist Theological Seminary (MDiv)	January 3, 2015 (Note: Took office following the resignation of Tom Coburn.)	2028; Class 3	Oklahoma City	11 years, 321 days
Oklahoma		Alan Armstrong	Republican	July 11, 1962 (age 64)	CEO of Williams Companies	None	University of Oklahoma (BS)	March 24, 2026 (Note: Took office following the resignation of Markwayne Mullin as Secretary of Homeland Security..)	2026; Class 2	Tulsa	242 days
Oregon		Ron Wyden	Democratic	May 3, 1949 (age 77)	Nonprofit organization executive Teacher	U.S. House	Stanford University (BA) University of Oregon (JD)	February 5, 1996 (Note: Elected to the seat following the resignation of Bob Packwood.)	2028; Class 3	Portland	30 years, 288 days
Oregon		Jeff Merkley	Democratic	October 24, 1956 (age 70)	CBO analyst Defense Department Nonprofit organization executive	Oregon House Speaker	Stanford University (BA) Princeton University (MPA)	January 3, 2009	2026; Class 2	Portland	17 years, 321 days
Pennsylvania		John Fetterman	Democratic	August 15, 1969 (age 57)	Nonprofit executive Youth program director GED teacher	Lieutenant Governor of Pennsylvania Mayor of Braddock	Albright College (BA) University of Connecticut (MBA) Harvard University (MPP)	January 3, 2023	2028; Class 3	Braddock	3 years, 321 days
Pennsylvania		Dave McCormick	Republican	August 17, 1965 (age 61)	Under Secretary of the Treasury for International Affairs U.S. Deputy National Security Advisor for International Economic Affairs Under Secretary of Commerce for Industry and Security Businessman Consultant U.S. Army officer	None	United States Military Academy (BS) Princeton University (MA, PhD)	January 3, 2025	2030; Class 1	Pittsburgh	1 year, 321 days
Rhode Island		Jack Reed	Democratic	November 12, 1949 (age 77)	Lawyer U.S. Army Reserve officer U.S. Army officer	U.S. House Rhode Island Senate	United States Military Academy (BS) Harvard University (MPP, JD)	January 3, 1997	2026; Class 2	Jamestown	29 years, 321 days
Rhode Island		Sheldon Whitehouse	Democratic	October 20, 1955 (age 71)	United States Attorney Lawyer	Rhode Island Attorney General	Yale University (BA) University of Virginia (JD)	January 3, 2007	2030; Class 1	Newport	19 years, 321 days
South Carolina		Tim Scott	Republican	September 19, 1965 (age 61)	Financial adviser Insurance agent	U.S. House South Carolina House of Representatives Charleston County Council	Presbyterian College Charleston Southern University (BS)	January 2, 2013 (Note: Appointed to the seat following the resignation of Jim DeMint.)	2028; Class 3	Hanahan	13 years, 322 days
South Carolina		Darline Graham	Republican	June 12, 1964 (age 62)	South Carolina Commissioner for the Blind South Carolina Workforce Development Board	None	College of Charleston (BS) South Carolina State University (MA)	July 14, 2026 (Note: Appointed to the seat following the death of her brother, Lindsey Graham.)	2026; Class 2	Lexington	129 days
South Dakota		John Thune	Republican	January 7, 1961 (age 65)	South Dakota Republican Party Executive Director State Railroad Director Nonprofit organization executive	U.S. House	Biola University (BA) University of South Dakota (MBA)	January 3, 2005	2028; Class 3	Sioux Falls	21 years, 321 days
South Dakota		Mike Rounds	Republican	October 24, 1954 (age 72)	Businessman	Governor of South Dakota South Dakota Senate	South Dakota State University (BS)	January 3, 2015	2026; Class 2	Fort Pierre	11 years, 321 days
Tennessee		Marsha Blackburn	Republican	June 6, 1952 (age 74)	Executive Director of the Tennessee Film, Entertainment, and Music Commission Marketing consultant	U.S. House Tennessee Senate	Mississippi State University (BS)	January 3, 2019	2030; Class 1	Brentwood	7 years, 321 days
Tennessee		Bill Hagerty	Republican	August 14, 1959 (age 67)	Tennessee Commissioner of Economic and Community Development United States Ambassador to Japan Private equity investment firm partner Management consultant	None	Vanderbilt University (BA, JD)	January 3, 2021	2026; Class 2	Nashville	5 years, 321 days
Texas		John Cornyn	Republican	February 2, 1952 (age 74)	Lawyer	Texas Attorney General Texas Supreme Court (Associate Justice) San Antonio District Judge	Trinity University (BA) St. Mary's University, Texas (JD) University of Virginia (LLM)	December 2, 2002 (Note: Phil Gramm resigned (effective November 30, 2002) a few weeks before the expiration of his term in hopes that his successor, fellow Republican John Cornyn, could gain seniority over other newly elected senators. However, Cornyn did not gain additional seniority due to a 1980 Rules Committee policy.)	2026; Class 2	Austin	23 years, 353 days
Texas		Ted Cruz	Republican	December 22, 1970 (age 55)	Texas Solicitor General U.S. Assoc. Deputy AG Lawyer	None	Princeton University (AB) Harvard University (JD)	January 3, 2013	2030; Class 1	Houston	13 years, 321 days
Utah		Mike Lee	Republican	June 4, 1971 (age 55)	Assistant United States Attorney Governor's general counsel Lawyer	None	Brigham Young University (BA, JD)	January 3, 2011	2028; Class 3	Provo	15 years, 321 days
Utah		John Curtis	Republican	May 10, 1960 (age 66)	Businessman	U.S. House Mayor of Provo	Brigham Young University (BS)	January 3, 2025	2030; Class 1	Provo	1 year, 321 days
Vermont		Bernie Sanders	Independent	September 8, 1941 (age 85)	Filmmaker Writer Political activist Carpenter Teacher	U.S. House Mayor of Burlington	Brooklyn College University of Chicago (BA)	January 3, 2007	2030; Class 1	Burlington	19 years, 321 days
Vermont		Peter Welch	Democratic	May 2, 1947 (age 79)	Lawyer Vermont Superior Court law clerk Community organizer	U.S. House Vermont Senate President Pro Tempore Minority Leader of the Vermont Senate	College of the Holy Cross (BA) University of California, Berkeley (JD)	January 3, 2023	2028; Class 3	Norwich	3 years, 321 days
Virginia		Mark Warner	Democratic	December 15, 1954 (age 71)	Virginia Democratic Party Chair Venture capitalist Businessman	Governor of Virginia	George Washington University (BA) Harvard University (JD)	January 3, 2009	2026; Class 2	Alexandria	17 years, 321 days
Virginia		Tim Kaine	Democratic	February 26, 1958 (age 68)	Democratic National Committee Chair Professor Lawyer Teacher Missionary	Governor of Virginia Lieutenant Governor of Virginia Mayor of Richmond	University of Missouri (BA) Harvard University (JD)	January 3, 2013	2030; Class 1	Richmond	13 years, 321 days
Washington		Patty Murray	Democratic	October 11, 1950 (age 76)	Lobbyist Teacher	Washington Senate Shoreline School Board	Washington State University (BA)	January 3, 1993	2028; Class 3	Seattle	33 years, 321 days
Washington		Maria Cantwell	Democratic	October 13, 1958 (age 68)	Marketing executive Lobbyist Activist Political campaigner	U.S. House Washington House of Representatives	Miami University (BA)	January 3, 2001	2030; Class 1	Edmonds	25 years, 321 days
West Virginia		Shelley Moore Capito	Republican	November 26, 1953 (age 72)	West Virginia Board of Regents educational information center director College career counselor	U.S. House West Virginia House of Delegates	Duke University (BA) University of Virginia (MEd)	January 3, 2015	2026; Class 2	Charleston	11 years, 321 days
West Virginia		Jim Justice	Republican	April 27, 1951 (age 75)	Businessman Owner of The Greenbrier	Governor of West Virginia	Marshall University (BA, MBA)	January 14, 2025 (Note: Inauguration delayed in order to finish his term as Governor of West Virginia.)	2030; Class 1	Lewisburg	1 year, 310 days
Wisconsin		Ron Johnson	Republican	April 8, 1955 (age 71)	Corporate executive Accountant	None	University of Minnesota (BS)	January 3, 2011	2028; Class 3	Oshkosh	15 years, 321 days
Wisconsin		Tammy Baldwin	Democratic	February 11, 1962 (age 64)	Lawyer	U.S. House Wisconsin Assembly Dane County Board of Supervisors	Smith College (BA) University of Wisconsin–Madison (JD)	January 3, 2013	2030; Class 1	Madison	13 years, 321 days
Wyoming		John Barrasso	Republican	July 21, 1952 (age 74)	Nonprofit organization executive Medical chief of staff Orthopedic surgeon	Wyoming Senate	Rensselaer Polytechnic Institute Georgetown University (BS, MD)	June 25, 2007 (Note: Appointed to the seat following the death of Craig L. Thomas.)	2030; Class 1	Casper	19 years, 148 days
Wyoming		Cynthia Lummis	Republican	September 10, 1954 (age 72)	Lawyer	U.S. House Wyoming Treasurer Wyoming Senate Wyoming House of Representatives	University of Wyoming (BS, JD)	January 3, 2021	2026; Class 2	Cheyenne	5 years, 321 days

== See also ==
- Seniority in the United States Senate
- List of current United States representatives
- List of members of the United States Congress by longevity of service
- List of United States Senate committees
- List of United States congressional joint committees
- Religious affiliation in the United States Senate
- Shadow congressperson
