= Seniority in the United States Senate =

Ranking of United States senators by length of service

United States senators are conventionally ranked by the length of their tenure in the Senate. The senator in each U.S. state with the longer time in office is known as the senior senator; the other is the junior senator. This convention has no official standing, though seniority confers several benefits, including preference in the choice of committee assignments, physical offices, and the member's desk assignment. When senators have been in office for the same length of time, a number of tiebreakers, including previous offices held, are used to determine seniority. By tradition, the longest serving senator of the majority party is named president pro tempore of the Senate, the second-highest office in the Senate and the third in the line of succession to the presidency of the United States.

== Benefits of seniority ==
The United States Constitution does not mandate differences in rights or power, but Senate rules give more power to senators with more seniority. Generally, more senior senators will have more power, especially within their own caucuses.

There are several benefits, including the following:

- Traditionally, the most senior member of the majority party is named president pro tempore of the Senate.
- Senators are given preferential treatment in choosing committee assignments based on seniority. Seniority on a committee is based on length of time serving on that committee, which means a senator may rank above another in committee seniority but be more junior in the full Senate. Although the committee chairmanship is an elected position, it is traditionally given to the most senior senator of the majority party serving on the committee, and not already holding a conflicting position such as chairmanship of another committee. The ranking member of a committee (called the vice-chairman in some select committees) is elected in the same way.
- Greater seniority enables a senator to choose a desk closer to the front of the Senate Chamber.
- Senators with higher seniority may choose to move into better office space as those offices are vacated.

== Determining the beginning of a term ==
The beginning of an appointment does not always coincide with the date the Senate convenes or when the new senator is sworn in.

=== General elections ===
In the case of senators first elected in a general election for the upcoming Congress, their terms begin on the first day of the new Congress. For most of American history this was March 4 of odd-numbered years, but effective from 1935 the 20th Amendment moved this to January 3 of odd-numbered years.

=== Run-off elections and special elections ===
In the case of senators elected in a run-off election occurring after the commencement of a new term, or a special election, their seniority date will be the date they are sworn in and not the first day of that Congress. A senator may be simultaneously elected to fill a term in a special election and elected to the six-year term which begins on the upcoming January 3. Their seniority is that of someone chosen in a special election.

=== Appointments ===
The seniority date for an appointed senator is usually the date of the appointment, although the actual term does not begin until they take the oath of office. An incoming senator who holds another office, including membership in the U.S. House of Representatives, must resign from that office before becoming a senator. In the 1970s, some senators would resign a few days or weeks early so that their successor may be appointed to the seat and have greater seniority than other freshmen. In 1980, party rule changes removed seniority advantages in such cases.

== Determining length of seniority ==
A senator's seniority is primarily determined by length of continuous service; for example, a senator who has served for twelve years is more senior than one who has served for ten years. Because several new senators usually join at the beginning of a new Congress, their relative seniority is further determined by prior federal or state government service and, if necessary, the amount of time spent in the tiebreaking office. These tiebreakers in order are:

1. Former senator
2. Former vice president of the United States
3. Former member of the United States House of Representatives
4. Former member of the Cabinet of the United States
5. Former state governor
6. Population of state based on the most recent census when the senator took office

When more than one senator had such office, its length of time is used to break the tie. For instance, Jerry Moran, John Boozman, John Hoeven, Ron Johnson, Rand Paul, Richard Blumenthal, and Mike Lee all took office on January 3, 2011. The first two senators mentioned had served in the House of Representatives: Moran had served for fourteen years and Boozman for nine. As a former governor, Hoeven was ranked immediately after the former House members. The rest were ranked by population as of the 2000 census. These ranked from 27th to 33rd in seniority when the 119th United States Congress convened.

If two senators are tied on all criteria, the one whose surname comes first alphabetically is considered the senior senator. This happened with Jon Ossoff and Raphael Warnock, both of Georgia, who were sworn in on January 20, 2021. Because they were both newly elected senators from the same state, with no prior government service, no other tie-breaking criteria could be used. The Senate's official records, as well as the Democratic Caucus, thus consider Ossoff, whose name comes first alphabetically and who had been elected to a full six-year term, as the senior senator.

== Current seniority list ==
Only relevant factors are listed below. For senators whose seniority is based on their state's respective population, the state population ranking is given as determined by the relevant United States census current at the time that they began service.

The most senior senators by class are Maria Cantwell (D-Washington) from Class 1, Mitch McConnell (R-Kentucky) from Class 2, and Chuck Grassley (R-Iowa) from Class 3. Cantwell is the most senior senator from her class while being the junior senator from her state.

Republican (53) Democratic (45) Independent (2)

Current rank	Historical rank (Note: "Historical rank" refers to the senator's seniority over the entire history of the Senate since 1789. This is an absolute number that does not change from one Congress to the next.)	Name	Party	State	Seniority date	Tiebreak(s)	Committee and leadership positions
1	1743	Chuck Grassley	Republican	Iowa	January 3, 1981		President pro tempore Chair: Judiciary
2	1766	Mitch McConnell	Republican	Kentucky	January 3, 1985		Chair: Rules
3	1812	Patty Murray	Democratic	Washington	January 3, 1993		President pro tempore emerita Vice Chair: Appropriations
4	1827	Ron Wyden	Democratic	Oregon	February 6, 1996		Ranking Member: Finance
5	1831	Dick Durbin	Democratic	Illinois	January 3, 1997	Former House member (14 years)	Senate Minority Whip; Ranking Member: Judiciary
6	1835	Jack Reed	Democratic	Rhode Island	January 3, 1997	Former House member (6 years)	Ranking Member: Armed Services
7	1842	Susan Collins	Republican	Maine	January 3, 1997		Chair: Appropriations
8	1844	Chuck Schumer	Democratic	New York	January 3, 1999	Former House member (18 years)	Senate Minority Leader
9	1846	Mike Crapo	Republican	Idaho	January 3, 1999	Former House member (6 years)	Republican Chief Deputy Whip; Chair: Finance
10	1859	Maria Cantwell (Note: Maria Cantwell (#10) is the Senate's most senior junior senator.)	Democratic	Washington	January 3, 2001		Ranking Member: Commerce
11	1867	John Cornyn	Republican	Texas	December 2, 2002 (Note: The seniority date for an appointed senator is the date of the appointment, not necessarily the date of taking the oath of office. See Determining the beginning of a term, above.)		Chair: Narcotics Caucus
12	1868	Lisa Murkowski	Republican	Alaska	December 20, 2002		Chair: Indian Affairs
13	1879	John Thune	Republican	South Dakota	January 3, 2005		Senate Majority Leader
14	1887	Bernie Sanders	Independent	Vermont	January 3, 2007	Former House member	Chair: Democratic Outreach Committee; Ranking Member: HELP
15	1893	Amy Klobuchar	Democratic	Minnesota	January 3, 2007	Minnesota 21st in population (2000)	Chair: Democratic Steering and Policy Committee; Ranking Member: Agriculture
16	1894	Sheldon Whitehouse	Democratic	Rhode Island	January 3, 2007	Rhode Island 43rd in population (2000)	Ranking Member: Environment; Ranking Member: Narcotics Caucus
17	1896	John Barrasso	Republican	Wyoming	June 22, 2007		Senate Majority Whip
18	1897	Roger Wicker	Republican	Mississippi	December 31, 2007		Chair: Armed Services
19	1901	Jeanne Shaheen	Democratic	New Hampshire	January 3, 2009	Former governor (6 years)	Ranking Member: Foreign Relations
20	1902	Mark Warner	Democratic	Virginia	January 3, 2009	Former governor (4 years)	Vice Chair: Democratic Caucus; Vice Chair: Intelligence
21	1903	Jim Risch	Republican	Idaho	January 3, 2009	Former governor (7 months)	Chair: Foreign Relations
22	1905	Jeff Merkley	Democratic	Oregon	January 3, 2009		Ranking Member: Budget
23	1909	Michael Bennet	Democratic	Colorado	January 21, 2009		
24	1910	Kirsten Gillibrand	Democratic	New York	January 26, 2009		Chair: DSCC; Ranking Member: Aging
25	1917	Chris Coons	Democratic	Delaware	November 15, 2010		Vice Chair: Ethics
26	1920	Jerry Moran	Republican	Kansas	January 3, 2011	Former House member (14 years)	Chair: Veterans' Affairs
27	1922	John Boozman	Republican	Arkansas	January 3, 2011	Former House member (9 years)	Chair: Agriculture
28	1924	John Hoeven	Republican	North Dakota	January 3, 2011	Former governor	
29	1926	Ron Johnson	Republican	Wisconsin	January 3, 2011	Wisconsin 20th in population (2000)	Chair: Budget
30	1927	Rand Paul	Republican	Kentucky	January 3, 2011	Kentucky 25th in population (2000)	Chair: Homeland Security
31	1928	Richard Blumenthal	Democratic	Connecticut	January 3, 2011	Connecticut 29th in population (2000)	Ranking Member: Veterans' Affairs
32	1929	Mike Lee	Republican	Utah	January 3, 2011	Utah 34th in population (2000)	Chair: Energy
33	1932	Brian Schatz	Democratic	Hawaii	December 26, 2012		Democratic Chief Deputy Whip; Deputy Secretary: Democratic Caucus; Vice Chair: Indian Affairs
34	1933	Tim Scott	Republican	South Carolina	January 2, 2013		Chair: NRSC; Chair: Banking
35	1934	Tammy Baldwin	Democratic	Wisconsin	January 3, 2013	Former House member (14 years)	Secretary: Democratic Caucus
36	1937	Chris Murphy	Democratic	Connecticut	January 3, 2013	Former House member (6 years); Connecticut 29th in population (2010)	Deputy Secretary: Democratic Caucus
37	1938	Mazie Hirono	Democratic	Hawaii	January 3, 2013	Former House member (6 years); Hawaii 40th in population (2010)	
38	1939	Martin Heinrich	Democratic	New Mexico	January 3, 2013	Former House member (4 years)	Ranking Member: Energy
39	1940	Angus King	Independent	Maine	January 3, 2013	Former governor (8 years)	
40	1941	Tim Kaine	Democratic	Virginia	January 3, 2013	Former governor (4 years)	
41	1942	Ted Cruz	Republican	Texas	January 3, 2013	Texas 2nd in population (2010)	Chair: Commerce
42	1943	Elizabeth Warren	Democratic	Massachusetts	January 3, 2013	Massachusetts 14th in population (2010)	Vice Chair: Democratic Caucus; Ranking Member: Banking
43	1944	Deb Fischer	Republican	Nebraska	January 3, 2013	Nebraska 38th in population (2010)	
44	1948	Ed Markey	Democratic	Massachusetts	July 16, 2013		Ranking Member: Small Business
45	1949	Cory Booker	Democratic	New Jersey	October 31, 2013		Chair: Democratic Strategic Communications Committee
46	1951	Shelley Moore Capito	Republican	West Virginia	January 3, 2015	Former House member (14 years)	Chair: Republican Policy Committee; Chair: Environment
47	1952	Gary Peters	Democratic	Michigan	January 3, 2015	Former House member (6 years); Michigan 8th in population (2010)	Ranking Member: Homeland Security
48	1953	Bill Cassidy	Republican	Louisiana	January 3, 2015	Former House member (6 years); Louisiana 25th in population (2010)	Chair: HELP
49	1955	James Lankford	Republican	Oklahoma	January 3, 2015	Former House member (4 years)	Vice Chair: Republican Conference; Chair: Ethics
50	1956	Tom Cotton	Republican	Arkansas	January 3, 2015	Former House member (2 years); Arkansas 32nd in population (2010)	Chair: Republican Conference; Chair: Intelligence
51	1957	Steve Daines	Republican	Montana	January 3, 2015	Former House member (2 years); Montana 44th in population (2010)	
52	1958	Mike Rounds	Republican	South Dakota	January 3, 2015	Former governor	
53	1960	Thom Tillis	Republican	North Carolina	January 3, 2015	North Carolina 10th in population (2010)	
54	1961	Joni Ernst	Republican	Iowa	January 3, 2015	Iowa 30th in population (2010)	Chair: Small Business
55	1963	Dan Sullivan	Republican	Alaska	January 3, 2015	Alaska 47th in population (2010)	
56	1964	Chris Van Hollen	Democratic	Maryland	January 3, 2017	Former House member (14 years)	
57	1965	Todd Young	Republican	Indiana	January 3, 2017	Former House member (6 years)	
58	1966	Tammy Duckworth	Democratic	Illinois	January 3, 2017	Former House member (4 years)	
59	1967	Maggie Hassan	Democratic	New Hampshire	January 3, 2017	Former governor	
60	1969	John Kennedy	Republican	Louisiana	January 3, 2017	Louisiana 25th in population (2010)	
61	1970	Catherine Cortez Masto	Democratic	Nevada	January 3, 2017	Nevada 35th in population (2010)	Vice Chair: Democratic Outreach Committee
62	1972	Tina Smith	Democratic	Minnesota	January 3, 2018		
63	1974	Cindy Hyde-Smith	Republican	Mississippi	April 2, 2018		
64	1975	Marsha Blackburn	Republican	Tennessee	January 3, 2019	Former House member (16 years)	
65	1977	Kevin Cramer	Republican	North Dakota	January 3, 2019	Former House member (6 years)	
66	1979	Jacky Rosen	Democratic	Nevada	January 3, 2019	Former House member (2 years)	
67	1982	Josh Hawley	Republican	Missouri	January 3, 2019		
68	1983	Rick Scott	Republican	Florida	January 8, 2019		Chair: Republican Steering Committee; Chair: Aging
69	1985	Mark Kelly	Democratic	Arizona	December 2, 2020		
70	1986	Ben Ray Luján	Democratic	New Mexico	January 3, 2021	Former House member (12 years)	
71	1987	Cynthia Lummis	Republican	Wyoming	January 3, 2021	Former House member (8 years)	
72	1988	Roger Marshall	Republican	Kansas	January 3, 2021	Former House member (4 years)	
73	1989	John Hickenlooper	Democratic	Colorado	January 3, 2021	Former governor	
74	1990	Bill Hagerty	Republican	Tennessee	January 3, 2021	Tennessee 17th in population (2010)	
75	1991	Tommy Tuberville	Republican	Alabama	January 3, 2021	Alabama 23rd in population (2010)	
76	1992	Alex Padilla	Democratic	California	January 18, 2021		Ranking Member: Rules
77	1993	Jon Ossoff	Democratic	Georgia	January 20, 2021	'O' 15th letter of the alphabet	
78	1994	Raphael Warnock	Democratic	Georgia	January 20, 2021	'W' 23rd letter of the alphabet	
79	1995	Peter Welch	Democratic	Vermont	January 3, 2023	Former House member (16 years)	
80	1997	Ted Budd	Republican	North Carolina	January 3, 2023	Former House member (6 years)	
81	1998	John Fetterman	Democratic	Pennsylvania	January 3, 2023	Pennsylvania 5th in population (2020)	
82	2000	Eric Schmitt	Republican	Missouri	January 3, 2023	Missouri 19th in population (2020)	
83	2001	Katie Britt	Republican	Alabama	January 3, 2023	Alabama 24th in population (2020)	
84	2002	Pete Ricketts	Republican	Nebraska	January 12, 2023		
85	2005	Adam Schiff	Democratic	California	December 8, 2024	Former House member (24 years)	
86	2006	Andy Kim	Democratic	New Jersey	December 8, 2024	Former House member (6 years)	
87	2007	Ruben Gallego	Democratic	Arizona	January 3, 2025	Former House member (10 years)	
88	2008	Jim Banks	Republican	Indiana	January 3, 2025	Former House member (8 years); Indiana 17th in population (2020)	
89	2009	Lisa Blunt Rochester	Democratic	Delaware	January 3, 2025	Former House member (8 years); Delaware 46th in population (2020)	
90	2010	John Curtis	Republican	Utah	January 3, 2025	Former House member (7 years)	
91	2011	Elissa Slotkin	Democratic	Michigan	January 3, 2025	Former House member (6 years)	
92	2012	Dave McCormick	Republican	Pennsylvania	January 3, 2025	Pennsylvania 5th in population (2020)	
93	2013	Bernie Moreno (Note: Bernie Moreno (#93) is the Senate's most junior senior senator.)	Republican	Ohio	January 3, 2025	Ohio 7th in population (2020)	
94	2014	Angela Alsobrooks	Democratic	Maryland	January 3, 2025	Maryland 18th in population (2020)	
95	2015	Tim Sheehy	Republican	Montana	January 3, 2025	Montana 44th in population (2020)	
96	2016	Jim Justice	Republican	West Virginia	January 14, 2025		
97	2017	Jon Husted	Republican	Ohio	January 18, 2025		
98	2018	Ashley Moody	Republican	Florida	January 21, 2025		
99	2019	Alan Armstrong	Republican	Oklahoma	March 24, 2026		
100	2020	Darline Graham	Republican	South Carolina	July 13, 2026		
Rank	Historical rank	Senator	Party	State	Seniority date	Other factors	Committee and leadership positions

== See also ==
- List of current United States senators
- List of United States Senate committees
- Seniority in the United States House of Representatives
- List of members of the United States Congress by longevity of service
