= Members of the 110th United States Senate =

The One Hundred Tenth United States Senate was the meeting of the Senate of the United States federal government, between January 3, 2007, and January 3, 2009, during the last two years of the second term of President George W. Bush.

Although the Democratic Party held fewer than 50 Senate seats, they had an operational majority because the two independent senators caucused with the Democrats for organizational purposes. No Democratic-held seats had fallen to the Republican Party in the 2006 elections.

== Overview ==

Affiliation	Members	Note
Democratic Party	48	
Republican Party	49	
Independent Democrat	1	Joe Lieberman caucuses with the Democrats.
Independent	1	Bernie Sanders caucuses with the Democrats.
Vacant Seats	1	Seat previously held by Barack Obama.
Total	99 (with one vacancy)	

Senators' party membership by state. Legend 2 Democrats 1 Democrat and 1 Republican 2 Republicans 1 Independent and 1 Democrat

== Leadership ==
Majority leadership
Office	Officer	State	Since
Senate Majority Leader; Democratic Conference Chairman	Harry Reid	Nevada	2006
Senate Majority Whip	Richard Durbin	Illinois	2007
Democratic Policy Committee Chairman	Byron Dorgan	North Dakota	1999
Democratic Conference Secretary	Patty Murray	Washington	2007
Democratic Campaign Committee Chairman and Vice-Chairman of the Democratic Conference	Chuck Schumer	New York	2005

Minority leadership
Office	Officer	State	Since
Senate Minority Leader	Mitch McConnell	Kentucky	2007
Senate Minority Whip	Jon Kyl	Arizona	2007
Republican Conference Chairman	Lamar Alexander	Tennessee	2007
Republican Policy Committee Chairman	Kay Bailey Hutchison	Texas	2007
Republican Conference Secretary	John Cornyn	Texas	2007
Republican Campaign Committee Chairman	John Ensign	Nevada	2007

== Members ==
Class	End of Term
1	2009
2	2011
3	2013

Class	State	Name	Party	Religion	Prior Experience	Education	First took office	Born
2	Alabama	Shelby, Richard	Republican	Methodist	Alabama Senate; U.S. House (AL-7)	University of Alabama (BA, JD)	1987	1934
1	Alabama	Sessions, Jeff	Republican	Methodist	State Attorney General	Huntingdon College, University of Alabama	1997	1946
1	Alaska	Stevens, Ted	Republican	Episcopalian	military, attorney, State House of Representatives	UCLA, Harvard	1968	1923
2	Alaska	Murkowski, Lisa	Republican	Roman Catholic	State House of Representatives	Georgetown, Willamette	2002	1957
2	Arizona	McCain, John	Republican	Baptist	military, U.S. House (AZ-1)	U.S. Naval Academy	1987	1936
3	Arizona	Kyl, Jon	Republican	Presbyterian	attorney, U.S. House (AZ-4)	Arizona (BA, JD)	1995	1942
2	Arkansas	Lincoln, Blanche	Democratic	Episcopalian	U.S. House (AR-1)	Randolph-Macon Women's College, Arkansas	1999	1960
1	Arkansas	Pryor, Mark	Democratic	Christian	Arkansas House of Representatives, State Attorney General	Arkansas (BA, JD)	2003	1963
3	California	Feinstein, Dianne	Democratic	Jewish	Mayor of San Francisco	Stanford University	1992	1933
2	California	Boxer, Barbara	Democratic	Jewish	Marin County Board of Supervisors, U.S. House (CA-6)	Brooklyn College	1993	1940
1	Colorado	Allard, Wayne	Republican	Protestant	U.S. House (CO-4)	Colorado State	1997	1943
2	Colorado	Salazar, Ken	Democratic	Roman Catholic	State Attorney General	Colorado College, Michigan	2005	1955
2	Connecticut	Dodd, Chris	Democratic	Roman Catholic	U.S. House (CT-2)	Providence, Louisville	1981	1944
3	Connecticut	Lieberman, Joe	Independent Democratic	Jewish	State Attorney General	Yale (BA, LLB)	1989	1942
1	Delaware	Biden, Joe	Democratic	Roman Catholic	New Castle County Council	Delaware, Syracuse	1973	1942
3	Delaware	Carper, Tom	Democratic	Presbyterian	Governor; U.S. House (DE-At Large);Delaware State Treasurer	Ohio State, Delaware	2001	1947
3	Florida	Nelson, Bill	Democratic	Episcopalian	U.S. House of Representatives, State Treasurer	Yale, Virginia	2001	1942
2	Florida	Martinez, Mel	Republican	Roman Catholic	U.S. Secretary of Housing and Urban Development	Florida State (BA, JD)	2005	1946
1	Georgia	Chambliss, Saxby	Republican	Episcopalian	U.S. House (GA-8)	Georgia, Tennessee	2003	1943
2	Georgia	Isakson, Johnny	Republican	Methodist	U.S. House (GA-6)	Georgia	2005	1944
2	Hawaii	Inouye, Daniel	Democratic	Methodist	U.S. House (HI-At Large)	Hawaii, George Washington	1963	1924
3	Hawaii	Akaka, Daniel	Democratic	Congregationalist	U.S. House (HI-2)	Hawaii (BA, M.Ed.)	1991	1924
1	Idaho	Craig, Larry	Republican	Methodist	U.S. House (ID-1)	Idaho	1991	1945
2	Idaho	Crapo, Mike	Republican	LDS	Idaho State Senate, U.S. House (ID-2)	Brigham Young, Harvard	1999	1951
1	Illinois	Durbin, Dick	Democratic	Roman Catholic	U.S. House (IL-20)	Georgetown (BS, JD)	1997	1944
2	Illinois	Obama, Barack	Democratic	United Church of Christ	Illinois State Senate	Columbia, Harvard	2005	1961
3	Indiana	Lugar, Richard	Republican	Methodist	Mayor of Indianapolis	Denison, Oxford	1977	1932
2	Indiana	Bayh, Evan	Democratic	Episcopalian	Indiana Secretary of State, Governor	Indiana University, Virginia	1999	1955
2	Iowa	Grassley, Chuck	Republican	Baptist	Iowa House of Representatives, U.S. House (IA-3)	Northern Iowa (BA, MA)	1981	1933
1	Iowa	Harkin, Tom	Democratic	Roman Catholic	U.S. House (IA-5)	Iowa State, Catholic	1985	1939
2	Kansas	Brownback, Sam	Republican	Roman Catholic	U.S. House (KS-2)	Kansas State, Kansas	1996	1956
1	Kansas	Roberts, Pat	Republican	Methodist	U.S. House (KS-1)	Kansas State	1997	1936
1	Kentucky	McConnell, Mitch	Republican	Baptist	Jefferson County Executive	Louisville, Kentucky	1985	1942
2	Kentucky	Bunning, Jim	Republican	Roman Catholic	Fort Thomas City Council, Kentucky State Senate, U.S. House (KY-4)	Xavier	1999	1931
1	Louisiana	Landrieu, Mary	Democratic	Roman Catholic	State Treasurer	Louisiana State	1997	1955
2	Louisiana	Vitter, David	Republican	Roman Catholic	U.S. House (LA-1)	Harvard, Oxford, Tulane	2005	1961
3	Maine	Snowe, Olympia	Republican	Eastern Orthodox	Maine House of Representatives;Maine Senate; U.S. House (ME-2)	Maine	1995	1947
1	Maine	Collins, Susan	Republican	Roman Catholic	Deputy State Treasurer	St. Lawrence	1997	1952
2	Maryland	Mikulski, Barbara	Democratic	Roman Catholic	Baltimore City Council, U.S. House (MD-3)	Mount Saint Agnes, Maryland	1987	1936
3	Maryland	Cardin, Ben	Democratic	Jewish	Maryland House of Delegates, U.S. House (MD-3)	Pittsburgh, Maryland	2007	1943
3	Massachusetts	Kennedy, Ted	Democratic	Roman Catholic	lawyer	Harvard, Virginia	1962	1932
1	Massachusetts	Kerry, John	Democratic	Roman Catholic	Lieutenant Governor	Yale, Boston College	1985	1943
1	Michigan	Levin, Carl	Democratic	Jewish	Detroit City Council	Swarthmore, Harvard	1979	1934
3	Michigan	Stabenow, Debbie	Democratic	United Methodist	Ingham County Board of Commissioners, Michigan House of Representatives, Michigan Senate, U.S. House (MI-8)	Michigan State (BA, MSW)	2001	1950
1	Minnesota	Coleman, Norm	Republican	Jewish	Mayor of St. Paul	Hofstra, Iowa	2003	1949
3	Minnesota	Klobuchar, Amy	Democratic-Farmer-Labor	Congregationalist	Hennepin County Attorney	Yale, Chicago	2007	1960
1	Mississippi	Cochran, Thad	Republican	Baptist	U.S. House (MS-4)	Mississippi (BA, JD)	1979	1937
3	Mississippi	Lott, Trent	Republican	Baptist	U.S. House (MS-5)	Mississippi	1989	1941
3	Mississippi	Wicker, Roger^{[I]}	Republican	Southern Baptist	U.S. House (MS-1)	Mississippi (BA, JD)	2007	1951
2	Missouri	Bond, Kit	Republican	Presbyterian	State Auditor, Governor	Princeton, Virginia	1987	1939
3	Missouri	McCaskill, Claire	Democratic	Roman Catholic	State Auditor; Missouri House of Representatives;Jackson County Prosecutor	University of Missouri (BS, JD)	2007	1953
1	Montana	Baucus, Max	Democratic	United Church of Christ	U.S. House (MT-1)	Stanford (BS, LLB)	1979	1941
3	Montana	Tester, Jon	Democratic	Church of God (Anderson)	Montana State Senate President	Great Falls	2007	1956
1	Nebraska	Hagel, Chuck	Republican	Episcopalian	electronics executive, investment banker	Nebraska Omaha	1997	1946
3	Nebraska	Nelson, Ben	Democratic	Methodist	Governor	Nebraska (BA, MA, JD)	2001	1941
2	Nevada	Reid, Harry	Democratic	LDS	Nevada Assembly, Lt. Governor of Nevada, U.S. House (NV-1)	Southern Utah, Utah State, George Washington	1987	1939
3	Nevada	Ensign, John	Republican	International Church of the Foursquare Gospel	U.S. House (NV-1)	UNLV, Oregon State, Colorado	2001	1958
2	New Hampshire	Gregg, Judd	Republican	Congregationalist	Governor, U.S. House (NH-2)	Columbia, Boston University	1993	1947
1	New Hampshire	Sununu, John E.	Republican	Roman Catholic	U.S. House (NH-1)	MIT, Harvard	2003	1964
1	New Jersey	Lautenberg, Frank	Democratic	Jewish	U.S. Senate, Class 1	Columbia	2003	1924
3	New Jersey	Menendez, Bob	Democratic	Roman Catholic	Mayor of Union City, New Jersey General Assembly, New Jersey Senate, U.S. House (NJ-13)	Saint Peter's College, Rutgers	2006	1954
1	New Mexico	Domenici, Pete	Republican	Roman Catholic	Albuquerque City Commission Chairman	New Mexico, Denver	1973	1932
3	New Mexico	Bingaman, Jeff	Democratic	Methodist	State Attorney General	Harvard, Stanford	1983	1943
2	New York	Schumer, Chuck	Democratic	Jewish	New York State Assembly, U.S. House (NY-9)	Harvard (BA, JD)	1999	1950
3	New York	Clinton, Hillary Rodham	Democratic	Methodist	First Lady, Lawyer	Wellesley, Yale	2001	1947
1	North Carolina	Dole, Elizabeth	Republican	Methodist	Secretary of Labor, President of the American Red Cross	Duke, Harvard	2003	1936
2	North Carolina	Burr, Richard	Republican	Methodist	U.S. House (NC-5)	Wake Forest	2005	1955
3	North Dakota	Conrad, Kent	Democratic	Unitarian Universalist	State Tax Commissioner	Stanford, George Washington	1987	1948
2	North Dakota	Dorgan, Byron	Democratic	Lutheran	U.S. House (ND-At Large)	North Dakota, Denver	1993	1942
2	Ohio	Voinovich, George	Republican	Roman Catholic	Mayor of Cleveland; Governor	Ohio, Ohio State	1999	1936
3	Ohio	Brown, Sherrod	Democratic	Lutheran	State Secretary of State, U.S. House (OH-13)	Yale, Ohio State	2007	1952
1	Oklahoma	Inhofe, Jim	Republican	Presbyterian	Oklahoma House of Rep; Oklahoma Senate; Mayor of Tulsa; U.S. House (OK-1)	Tulsa	1995	1934
2	Oklahoma	Coburn, Tom	Republican	Baptist	Physician, U.S. House (OK-2)	Oklahoma State, Oklahoma	2005	1948
2	Oregon	Wyden, Ron	Democratic	Jewish	U.S. House (OR-3)	Stanford, Oregon	1996	1949
1	Oregon	Smith, Gordon	Republican	LDS	State Senate President	Brigham Young, Southwestern	1997	1952
2	Pennsylvania	Specter, Arlen	Republican	Jewish	Philadelphia District Attorney	Pennsylvania, Yale	1981	1930
3	Pennsylvania	Casey, Bob, Jr.	Democratic	Roman Catholic	State Treasurer	Holy Cross, Catholic	2007	1960
1	Rhode Island	Reed, Jack	Democratic	Roman Catholic	State Senate; U.S. House (RI-2)	United States Military Academy, Harvard	1997	1949
3	Rhode Island	Whitehouse, Sheldon	Democratic	Episcopalian	State Attorney General	Yale, Virginia	2007	1955
1	South Carolina	Graham, Lindsey	Republican	Southern Baptist	U.S. House (SC-3)	South Carolina (BA, JD)	2003	1955
2	South Carolina	DeMint, Jim	Republican	Presbyterian	U.S. House (SC-4)	Tennessee, Clemson University	2005	1951
1	South Dakota	Johnson, Tim	Democratic	Lutheran	U.S. House (SD-At Large)	South Dakota (BA, MPA, JD)	1997	1946
2	South Dakota	Thune, John	Republican	Evangelical Christian	U.S. House (SD-At Large)	Biola, South Dakota	2005	1961
1	Tennessee	Alexander, Lamar	Republican	Presbyterian	Governor; U.S. Secretary of Education	Vanderbilt, New York University	2003	1940
3	Tennessee	Corker, Bob	Republican	Presbyterian	Mayor of Chattanooga	Tennessee	2007	1952
3	Texas	Hutchison, Kay Bailey	Republican	Episcopalian	State Treasurer	Texas (BA, JD)	1993	1943
1	Texas	Cornyn, John	Republican	Church of Christ	State Attorney General	Trinity University, St. Mary's University, Virginia	2003	1952
3	Utah	Hatch, Orrin	Republican	LDS	attorney	Brigham Young, Pittsburgh	1977	1934
2	Utah	Bennett, Robert	Republican	LDS	businessman	Utah	1993	1933
2	Vermont	Leahy, Patrick	Democratic	Roman Catholic	Chittenden County State's Attorney	Saint Michael's College, Georgetown	1975	1940
3	Vermont	Sanders, Bernie	Independent	Jewish	U.S. House (VT-At Large)	College, Chicago	2007	1941
1	Virginia	Warner, John	Republican	Episcopalian	U.S. Secretary of the Navy	Washington and Lee, Virginia	1979	1927
3	Virginia	Webb, Jim	Democratic	Protestant	U.S. Secretary of the Navy	U.S. Naval Academy, Southern California, Georgetown University	2007	1946
2	Washington	Murray, Patty	Democratic	Roman Catholic	State Senate	Washington State	1993	1950
3	Washington	Cantwell, Maria	Democratic	Roman Catholic	Washington State House of Representatives, U.S. House (WA-1)	Miami University	2001	1958
3	West Virginia	Byrd, Robert	Democratic	Baptist	U.S. House (WV-6)	Marshall, American	1959	1917
1	West Virginia	Rockefeller, Jay	Democratic	Presbyterian	Governor	Harvard	1985	1937
3	Wisconsin	Kohl, Herb	Democratic	Jewish	State Democratic Party chairman	Wisconsin–Madison, Harvard	1989	1935
2	Wisconsin	Feingold, Russ	Democratic	Jewish	State Senate	Wisconsin–Madison, Oxford, Harvard	1993	1953
1	Wyoming	Enzi, Mike	Republican	Presbyterian	Mayor of Gillette; Wyoming House of Representatives; State Senate	George Washington, Denver	1997	1944
3	Wyoming	Thomas, Craig	Republican	Methodist	U.S. House (WY-At Large)	Wyoming	1995	1933
3	Wyoming	Barrasso, John^{[A]}	Republican	Presbyterian	State Senate	Georgetown (BS, MD)	2007	1952
