= Current party leaders of the United States Senate =

The party leadership of the United States Senate refers to the officials elected by the Senate Democratic Caucus and the Senate Republican Conference to manage the affairs of each party in the Senate. Each party is led by a floor leader who directs the legislative agenda of their caucus in the Senate, and who is augmented by an assistant leader or whip, and several other officials who work together to manage the floor schedule of legislation, enforce party discipline, and oversee efforts to maintain and grow the party's seats in the Senate.

The constitutionally defined Senate leadership roles are the vice president of the United States, who serves as president of the Senate, and the president pro tempore, traditionally the most senior member of the majority, who theoretically presides in the absence of the vice president.

Unlike committee chairmanships, leadership positions are not traditionally conferred on the basis of seniority, but are elected in closed-door caucuses.

== Democratic leadership ==
Since the start of the 119th Congress on, January 3, 2025, the Democratic Party has constituted a minority in the United States Senate.

Rank	Position	Name	State	Notes
1	Democratic Floor Leader	Chuck Schumer	New York	Senate Minority Leader; Concurrently serves as the Chair of the Senate Democratic Caucus. (Note: Since 1920, the Senate Democratic leader has also concurrently served as the Democratic Caucus chairperson; this is an unwritten tradition.)
2	Democratic Floor Whip	Dick Durbin	Illinois	Senate Minority Whip
3	Chair of the Steering and Policy Committee	Amy Klobuchar	Minnesota	Steering: Serves as a liaison between Senate Democratic offices, advocacy groups, intergovernmental organizations, and leaders across the country. Policy: Responsible for providing Senate Democrats with research, policy-formulation, and communications guidance on key caucus priorities.
4	Chair of the Strategic Communications Committee	Cory Booker	New Jersey	Responsible for leading the Caucus’ communication and messaging strategy, ensuring the accomplishments and priorities of Senate Democrats are heard loud and clear across the county. Also using creative strategies and new technology to speak directly to the American people. Also responsible for providing various services to Democratic Senators and their staff, the SCC enhances Senate Democrats’ ability to formulate and advance their agenda through the use of modern communications.
5	Vice Chairs of the Senate Democratic Caucus	Elizabeth Warren	Massachusetts	Position created for Schumer after successful tenure as DSCC chairman. They are charged with keeping and building support for Democratic values.
5	Vice Chairs of the Senate Democratic Caucus	Mark Warner	Virginia	Position created for Schumer after successful tenure as DSCC chairman. They are charged with keeping and building support for Democratic values.
6	Chair of the Democratic Outreach Committee	Bernie Sanders (Note: Independent who caucuses with the Democrats.)	Vermont	Responsible for fostering relations between Senate Democrats and community leaders and interest groups. Hosts meetings with advocates, activists, and elected officials to help with Democratic structure in the Senate.
7	Secretary of the Senate Democratic Caucus	Tammy Baldwin	Wisconsin	Responsible for managing the policy agenda for the Senate Democratic Caucus, as well as taking notes and aiding party leadership when the caucus meets.
8	Chair of the Democratic Senatorial Campaign Committee	Kirsten Gillibrand	New York	Responsible for electing and reelecting Democrats to the Senate by organizing fundraising, candidate recruitment and sending new leaders to Washington who will move the country forward.
9	Vice Chair of the Democratic Outreach Committee	Catherine Cortez Masto	Nevada	Assists the Chair with fostering relations between Senate Democrats and community leaders and interest groups; also assists in hosting meetings with advocates, activists, and elected officials to help with Democratic structure in the Senate.
10	Deputy Secretaries of the Senate Democratic Caucus	Brian Schatz	Hawaii	Assists the Caucus Secretary in managing the policy agenda for the Senate Democratic Caucus and aids in taking notes at Caucus meetings.
10	Deputy Secretaries of the Senate Democratic Caucus	Chris Murphy	Connecticut	Assists the Caucus Secretary in managing the policy agenda for the Senate Democratic Caucus and aids in taking notes at Caucus meetings.
11	Vice Chair of the Steering and Policy Committee	Jeanne Shaheen	New Hampshire	Steering: Along with the Chair, serves as a liaison between Senate Democratic offices, advocacy groups, intergovernmental organizations, and leaders across the country. Policy: Assists the Chair for providing Senate Democrats with research, policy-formulation, and communications guidance on key caucus priorities.
12	Vice Chair of the Strategic Communications Committee	Tina Smith	Minnesota	Assists the Chair for providing various services to Democratic Senators and their staff, by enhancing Senate Democrats’ ability to formulate and advance their agenda through the use of modern communications.
–	Senate Democratic Chief Deputy Whip	Brian Schatz	Hawaii	Is the Chief Deputy to the Democratic Whip and chief of the democratic whip operations. They are responsible for aiding in gathering the votes (or "whip up" support for the party position) of the Democratic party on major issues. They also lead a team of Deputy Whips who are selected democratic senators chosen by the Democratic Whip.
-	Vice Chairs of the Democratic Senatorial Campaign Committee	Mark Kelly	Arizona	Assists the Chair in electing and reelecting Democrats to the Senate by aiding in organizing fundraising, candidate recruitment and sending new leaders to Washington that will move the country forward.
-	Vice Chairs of the Democratic Senatorial Campaign Committee	Adam Schiff	California	Assists the Chair in electing and reelecting Democrats to the Senate by aiding in organizing fundraising, candidate recruitment and sending new leaders to Washington that will move the country forward.
-	Vice Chairs of the Democratic Senatorial Campaign Committee	Lisa Blunt Rochester	Delaware	Assists the Chair in electing and reelecting Democrats to the Senate by aiding in organizing fundraising, candidate recruitment and sending new leaders to Washington that will move the country forward.
–	Senate President pro tempore emerita	Patty Murray	Washington	Senator who was the previous (emeritus/emerita) president pro tempore when the Democrats previously were in the majority, honorary member of Democratic leadership. (Note: Murray was previously the #3 Democratic serving as the Democratic Assistant Leader prior to being named the President pro Tempore for the 118th Congress.)

== Republican leadership ==
Since the start of the 119th Congress on, January 3, 2025, the Republican Party has constituted a majority in the United States Senate.

Rank	Position	Name	State	Notes
1	Republican Floor Leader	John Thune	South Dakota	Senate Majority Leader
2	Republican Floor Whip	John Barrasso	Wyoming	Senate Majority Whip
3	Chair of the Senate Republican Conference	Tom Cotton	Arkansas	Oversees floor leader elections, informs the media of the opinions and activities of the Senate Republicans, and provides a full range of communications services to Republican senators.
4	Chair of the Republican Policy Committee	Shelley Moore Capito	West Virginia	Policy liaison between committees and conference legislation. Organizes conference Tuesday lunches with summaries of major bills and analysis.
5	Vice Chair of the Senate Republican Conference	James Lankford	Oklahoma	Takes minutes and assists chair with conference operations.
6	Chair of the National Republican Senatorial Committee	Tim Scott	South Carolina	Responsible for overseeing efforts to elect Republicans to the Senate.
7	Chair of the Senate Republican Steering Committee	Mike Lee	Utah	
-	Senate Republican Chief Deputy Whip	Mike Crapo	Idaho	Assists the Republican Whip in gathering votes to pass major legislation as well as confirming presidential nominations. Aides in keeping Republican senators within party line voting.

== Presiding officials ==
Rank	Position	Name	State	Notes
1	President of the Senate	J. D. Vance	Ohio	Not a senator; see Vice President of the United States In practicality, only an ex officio leadership member due to the vice president's executive branch nature
2	Senate president pro tempore	Chuck Grassley	Iowa	Usually the longest serving member of the majority party; honorary member of the leadership team.
