= Democratic Caucus Chairman =

In the United States Congress, Democratic Caucus Chairman can refer to:

- The Democratic Conference Chairman of the United States Senate (who is also concurrently the party floor leader)
- The Democratic Caucus Chairman of the United States House of Representatives
