= Republican Conference Chair =

Republican Conference Chair may refer either to the United States Senate Republican Conference Chair, a position in the Republican party leadership of the United States Senate, or its House analogue, the Republican Conference Chairman of the United States House of Representatives.
