= Thomas B. Turley =

American politician, lawyer and soldier (1845–1910)

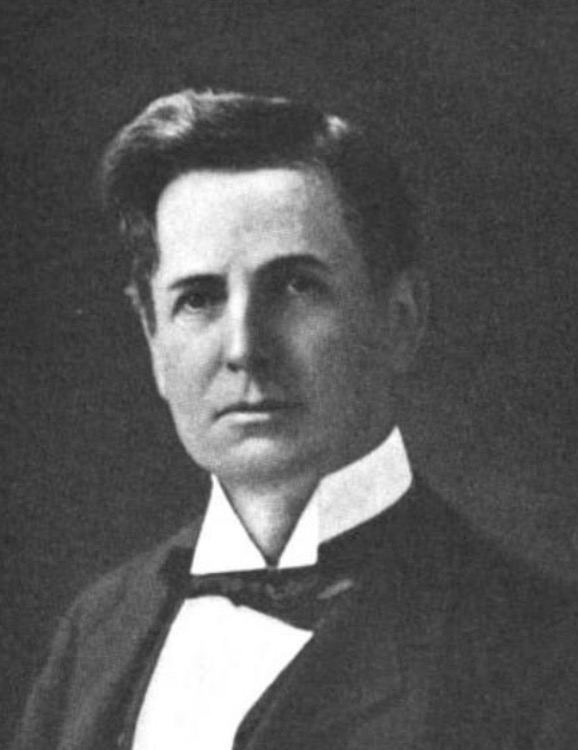

United States Senator from Tennessee
- In office July 20, 1897 – March 3, 1901
- Preceded by: Isham G. Harris
- Succeeded by: Edward W. Carmack

Secretary of the Senate Democratic Caucus
- In office 1897–1901
- Preceded by: Position established
- Succeeded by: Edward W. Carmack

Personal details
- Born: Thomas Battle Turley; April 5, 1845 Memphis, Tennessee, US
- Died: July 1, 1910 (aged 65) Memphis, Tennessee, US
- Resting place: Elmwood Cemetery
- Party: Democratic
- Relations: William B. Turley (uncle)
- Occupation: Politician, lawyer, soldier

Military service
- Allegiance: Confederate States
- Branch/service: Confederate States Army
- Rank: Private
- Unit: 154th Tennessee Infantry Regiment
- Battles/wars: American Civil War; Atlanta campaign; Battle of Peachtree Creek; Battle of Shiloh; Battle of Nashville

Thomas Battle Turley (April 5, 1845 – July 1, 1910) was an American politician, lawyer, and soldier. A Democrat, he was a member of the United States Senate from Tennessee.

Born in Memphis, Tennessee, Turley served as a private in the Confederate States Army during the American Civil War. He then became a lawyer and practicied in Memphis, alongside Isham G. Harris. Harris was later elected to the Senate, and after Harris' death, Turley succeeded him. He served from 1897 to 1901.

== Early life and military service ==
Turley was born on April 5, 1845, in Memphis, Tennessee, the son of lawyer Thomas Jefferson Turley and Ora (née Battle) Turley. Some sources claims his mother was instead named Flora. His uncle was judge William B. Turley. He was of Irish ancestry. He was educated at local schools, either public or private.

In 1861, during the American Civil War, Turley served as a private in the 154th Tennessee Infantry Regiment, of the Confederate States Army, under George Earl Maney. Turley, age 15 when he enlisted, was small, being described as the same height of his gun, and the same weight as the equipment he carried.

Turley fought in the Atlanta campaign and the Battle of Shiloh, being wounded during both; in the Atlanta campaign, he was wounded at the Battle of Peachtree Creek, specifically. He also fought in the Battle of Nashville, during which he was captured and held at Camp Chase from December 1864, until being exchanged in March 1865. He may have been prisoner until the end of the war.

== Career ==
In 1867, Turley graduated from the University of Virginia School of Law, with a Bachelor of Laws. In 1870, he was admitted to the bar, after which he began practicing in Memphis. He was a member of the partnership Harris, McKissick & Turley, alongside Isham G. Harris and L. D. McKissick. Turley was elected to the United States Senate, and McKissick moved to California. The partnership ended in 1885 or 1886, at which point Turley partnered with Luke Edward Wright. Turley's father and Wright's were also law partners.

Turley was a Democrat. In 1876, he unsuccessfully ran for Tennessee Presidential elector, a position that Harris was nominated for, but which he declined due to controversy regarding his governorship. He was a member of the United States Senate, from July 20, 1897, to March 3, 1901. He was appointed by Governor Robert Love Taylor to fill the unexpired term of Harris, who had died in office, and was elected by the Senate. He declined to run in the following election, with him saying that he enjoyed debating, but disliked the "practical politics". His tenure as senator was the only public office he held.

Ideologically, Turley was liberal, being the most liberal member of both Congresses he served in. He supported expanding currency, reforming tariffs, and opposed imperialism. He was a member of the Democratic Steering and Outreach Committee and was Secretary of the Senate Democratic Caucus. He led the push to remove Matthew Quay from the Senate.

After serving in Congress, Turley returned to practicing law in Memphis. Turley and Wright disbanded, after which he partnered with his son, E. R. Turley. He was also a member of Turley & Naill, a real estate law firm. As a lawyer, he primarily practiced in courts of equity.

== Personal life and death ==
In 1870, Turley married Irene Raynor (or Rayner), with whom he had five children. However, one publication claims that Irene Raynor was his mother, and that he instead married Shalle Johnston.

Turley died on July 1, 1910, aged 65, in Memphis, and was buried at Elmwood Cemetery. His health had deteriorated throughout the last year of his life, with it ending in "nervous collapse". An archive of his papers is held by the Tennessee State Library and Archives.

U.S. Senate
Preceded by Isham G. Harris	U.S. senator (Class 2) from Tennessee; 1897–1901; Served alongside: William B. Bate	Succeeded by Edward W. Carmack
