= United States Senate Democratic Steering and Outreach Committee =

Committee of the U.S. Senate

The United States Senate Democratic Steering and Outreach Committee (DSOC) is a committee of the United States Senate dedicated to fostering dialogue between Senate Democrats and community leaders across the United States. The Steering Committee hosts several meetings each year with advocates, activists, policy experts, and elected officials to help the structuring of the Democrats' agenda in the United States Senate. Some of these meetings also happen annually such as with U.S. Jewish groups to discuss the U.S. Israel relations and the Jewish community in the United States. It is one of two Democratic leadership committees in the Senate, the other being the Senate Democratic Strategic Communications Committee.

== Members, 119th Congress ==
Roster
Senator	State
Amy Klobuchar, Steering & Policy Chair	Minnesota
Jeanne Shaheen, Steering & Policy Vice Chair	New Hampshire
Bernie Sanders, Outreach Chair	Vermont
Catherine Cortez Masto, Outreach Vice Chair	Nevada
Chuck Schumer	New York
Dick Durbin	Illinois
Kirsten Gillibrand	New York
Chris Coons	Delaware
Brian Schatz	Hawaii
Tammy Baldwin	Wisconsin
Chris Murphy	Connecticut
Vacant (Note: Formerly Bob Casey Jr. of Pennsylvania who lost reelection bid in 2024.)	TBA
Vacant (Note: Formerly Jon Tester of Montana who lost reelection bid in 2024.)	TBA
Vacant (Note: Formerly Bob Menendez who resigned in 2024 after his political corruption and conspiracy to act as a foreign agent charges conviction.)	TBA

== Historical Committee Rosters ==
=== 118th Congress ===
Roster
Senator	State
Amy Klobuchar, Steering Chair	Minnesota
Jeanne Shaheen, Steering Vice Chair	New Hampshire
Bernie Sanders, Outreach Chair	Vermont
Catherine Cortez Masto, Outreach Vice Chair	Nevada
Chuck Schumer	New York
Dick Durbin	Illinois
Kirsten Gillibrand	New York
Chris Coons	Delaware
Bob Casey, Jr.	Pennsylvania
Jon Tester	Montana
Brian Schatz	Hawaii
Tammy Baldwin	Wisconsin
Chris Murphy	Connecticut
Robert Menendez, Chair of Hispanic Task Force (until August 20, 2024)	New Jersey

=== 117th Congress ===
Roster
Senator	State
Amy Klobuchar, Steering Chair	Minnesota
Jeanne Shaheen, Steering Vice Chair	New Hampshire
Bernie Sanders, Outreach Chair	Vermont
Catherine Cortez Masto, Outreach Vice Chair	Nevada
Chuck Schumer	New York
Dick Durbin	Illinois
Patrick Leahy	Vermont
Kirsten Gillibrand	New York
Chris Coons	Delaware
Bob Casey, Jr.	Pennsylvania
Jon Tester	Montana
Brian Schatz	Hawaii
Tammy Baldwin	Wisconsin
Chris Murphy	Connecticut
Robert Menendez, Chair of Hispanic Task Force	New Jersey

=== 116th Congress ===
After Bill Nelson lost his 2018 reelection bid, he left the committee and his position was left unfilled.

Roster
Senator	State
Amy Klobuchar, Chair	Minnesota
Jeanne Shaheen, Vice Chair	New Hampshire
Chuck Schumer	New York
Dick Durbin	Illinois
Patrick Leahy	Vermont
Kirsten Gillibrand	New York
Chris Coons	Delaware
Bob Casey, Jr.	Pennsylvania
Jon Tester	Montana
Brian Schatz	Hawaii
Tammy Baldwin	Wisconsin
Robert Menendez, Chair of Hispanic Task Force	New Jersey

=== 115th Congress ===
Roster
Senator	State
Amy Klobuchar, Steering Chair	Minnesota
Bernie Sanders, Outreach Chair	Vermont
Jeanne Shaheen, Vice Chair	New Hampshire
Chuck Schumer	New York
Dick Durbin	Illinois
Patrick Leahy	Vermont
Kirsten Gillibrand	New York
Chris Coons, Chair of Business Outreach	Delaware
Bill Nelson	Florida
Bob Casey, Jr.	Pennsylvania
Jon Tester	Montana
Brian Schatz	Hawaii
Tammy Baldwin	Wisconsin
Bob Menendez, Chair of Hispanic Task Force	New Jersey

== Leadership ==
=== Chairpersons ===
Leadership
Term	Senator		State	
108th	Hillary Clinton		New York	
109th	Hillary Clinton		New York	
110th	Debbie Stabenow		Michigan	
111th	Debbie Stabenow		Michigan	
112th	Mark Begich		Alaska	
113th	Mark Begich		Alaska	
114th	Amy Klobuchar		Minnesota	
	Steering		Outreach	
Term	Senator	State	Senator	State
115th	Amy Klobuchar	Minnesota	Bernie Sanders	Vermont
116th	Amy Klobuchar	Minnesota	Bernie Sanders	Vermont
117th	Amy Klobuchar	Minnesota	Bernie Sanders	Vermont
118th	Amy Klobuchar	Minnesota	Bernie Sanders	Vermont
119th	Amy Klobuchar (Note: As Chair of the Steering & Policy Committee)	Minnesota	Bernie Sanders	Vermont

=== Vice Chairpersons ===
Leadership
Term	Senator		State	
112th	Daniel Akaka		Hawaii	
113th	Jeanne Shaheen		New Hampshire	
114th	Jeanne Shaheen		New Hampshire	
	Steering		Outreach	
Term	Senator	State	Senator	State
115th	Jeanne Shaheen	New Hampshire	Position not established until 2021 at the start of the 117th Congress.	
116th	Jeanne Shaheen	New Hampshire	Position not established until 2021 at the start of the 117th Congress.	
117th	Jeanne Shaheen	New Hampshire	Catherine Cortez Masto	Nevada
118th	Jeanne Shaheen	New Hampshire	Catherine Cortez Masto	Nevada
119th	Jeanne Shaheen (Note: As Vice Chair of the Steering & Policy Committee)	New Hampshire	Catherine Cortez Masto	Nevada

== History ==
The committee has operated under several names throughout its history, previously known as the Senate Democratic Steering and Coordination Committee before being renamed the Senate Democratic Steering and Outreach Committee.

In November 2008, following that year's presidential election, the committee, whose responsibilities include proposing chairmanships and committee assignments to be ratified by the Democratic caucus, considered stripping Connecticut senator Joe Lieberman of his Chairmanship of the United States Senate Committee on Homeland Security and Governmental Affairs after he endorsed Republican senator John McCain in his 2008 presidential campaign. Many within the caucus expressed disappointment over his fervent support for McCain and his questioning of then Democratic senator Barack Obama's qualifications to run for the position. Ultimately, the caucus voted 42–13 to allow Lieberman to retain his chairmanship while sanctioning him to be removed from the United States Senate Committee on Environment and Public Works.

Following the 2014 midterm elections, in which Democrats lost their Senate majority, then-Minority Leader Harry Reid appointed Minnesota senator Amy Klobuchar as chair of the committee. Reid tasked Klobuchar specifically with finding common ground with the incoming Republican majority, with the role focused on working with business groups and outside organizations to develop the Democratic policy agenda.

In November 2016, after Democrat Hillary Clinton lost the 2016 United States presidential election, then-Senate Democratic Leader-elect Chuck Schumer announced Bernie Sanders would fill the newly established position of Outreach Chair in the committee. Sanders came to prominence during the 2016 Democratic Party presidential primaries and his appointment was seen as a broader acknowledgment of his role in galvanizing the electorate. This made Sanders the first independent to hold a leadership position within the Democratic Party.

Following the 2024 Senate elections, in which Democrats again fell into the minority, the committee was reorganized and renamed the Senate Democratic Steering and Policy Committee. Klobuchar was elevated to chair of the renamed committee, becoming the No. 3 Democrat in Senate leadership. Sanders was retained as Chair of Outreach, Catherine Cortez Masto of Nevada as Vice Chair of Outreach, and Jeanne Shaheen of New Hampshire as Vice Chair of the Steering and Policy Committee.
