= Senate Republican Conference =

Formal organization of Republican U.S. senators

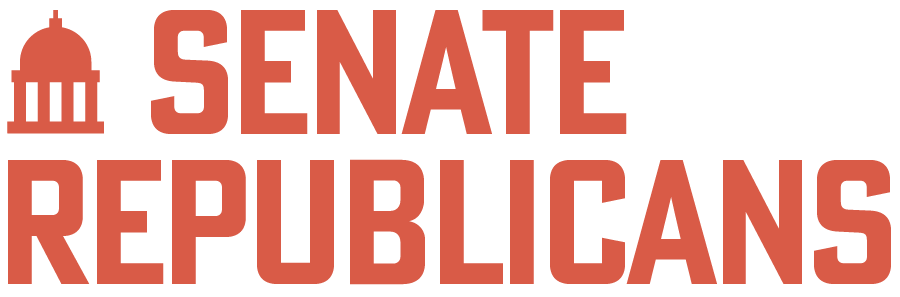
- Part of: United States Senate
- Floor Leader: John Thune (SD)
- Floor Whip: John Barrasso (WY)
- Chair: Tom Cotton (AR)
- Vice Chair: James Lankford (OK)
- Ideology: Right-wing populism Conservatism
- Political position: Right-wing
- Affiliation: Republican Party
- Colors: Red
- Seats: 53 / 100

Election symbol

Website
- republican.senate.gov

The Senate Republican Conference is the formal organization of the Republican senators in the United States Senate. Over the last century, the mission of the conference has expanded and been shaped as a means of informing the media of the opinions and activities of Senate Republicans. The Senate Republican Conference assists Republican senators by providing a full range of communications services including graphics, radio, television, and the Internet. Its chairman is Senator Tom Cotton, and its vice chairman is Senator James Lankford.

== Conference hierarchy ==
Effective as of January 3, 2025, the conference leadership is:

- John Thune (SD) as Senate Majority Leader
- John Barrasso (WY) as Senate Majority Whip
- Tom Cotton (AR) as Chairman of the Republican Conference
- Shelley Moore Capito (WV) as Chairwoman of the Senate Republican Policy Committee
- James Lankford (OK) as Vice Chairman of the Senate Republican Conference
- Tim Scott (SC) as Chairman of the National Republican Senatorial Committee
- Rick Scott (FL) as Chairman of the Senate Republican Steering Committee
- Mike Crapo (ID) as Senate Republican Chief Deputy Whip
- Chuck Grassley (IA) as President pro tempore

== History ==
The Republican Conference of the United States Senate is a descendant of the early American party caucus that decided party policies, approved appointees, and selected candidates. The meetings were private, and early records of the deliberations do not exist. Senate Republicans began taking formal minutes only in 1911, and they began referring to their organization as the "conference" in 1913. An early outgrowth of the effort to enhance party unity was the creation, in 1874, of a steering committee to prepare a legislative schedule for consideration by the conference. The committee became a permanent part of the Republican organization.

The steering committee, formalized Republican "leadership" in the 19th century was minimal; most legislative guidance came from powerful committee chairmen managing particular bills. The conference began to acquire significance, however, with the election of Senator William B. Allison of Iowa as chairman in 1897, and during the terms of successors such as Senator Orville H. Platt of Connecticut and Senator Nelson W. Aldrich of Rhode Island. The chairman in 1915, Senator Jacob H. Gallinger of New Hampshire, who two years earlier had elected a whip to maintain a quorum to conduct Senate business. Senator James W. Wadsworth, Jr. of New York was elected both conference secretary and whip; a week later the responsibilities were divided between Senator Wadsworth as Secretary and Senator Charles Curtis of Kansas, who was elected whip.

The conference continued to meet in private to assure confidentiality and candor. This practice was suspended only once, on May 27, 1919, when the conference reaffirmed its commitment to the seniority system for choosing committee chairmen by electing Senator Boies Penrose of Pennsylvania as chairman of the finance committee over objections from Progressive Republican insurgents. (This was apparently the only open party conference in the history of the Senate.)

During this period, the chairman also served as informal floor leader. One reason for the lack of a formal post was that committee chairmen usually took responsibility to move to proceed to the consideration of measures reported by their respective committees and managed the legislation on the floor. The first recorded Conference election of a formal floor leader was held March 5, 1925, when the conference chairman, Senator Curtis of Kansas, was unanimously chosen to serve in both posts.

Throughout the 1920s, when Republicans held the Senate majority, the conference met chiefly at the beginning of each session to make committee assignments; for the remainder of the session, Members were notified of the order of business by mail. This slow pace continued through the 1930s, when Republican senators were so few that they dispensed with a permanent whip, and the conference chairman and floor leader, Senator Charles L. McNary of Oregon, appointed senators to serve as whip on particular pieces of legislation.

Senator McNary died in 1944, and the posts of conference chairman and floor leader were separated in 1945. Senator Arthur H. Vandenberg of Michigan became chairman and Senator Wallace H. White, Jr., of Maine became floor leader. This separation has continued to be one of the chief differences between the Republican and Democratic Conferences, since the floor leader of the Democrats has continued to serve as their conference chairman.

In 1944, Senator Robert A. Taft of Ohio, still in his first term, persuaded Republicans to revive their steering committee, and he became its chairman. In 1946, it became the Republican Policy Committee under legislation appropriating equal funds for majority and minority parties (a separate steering committee was created in 1974 but its operations are funded by member dues, not by Congress). Until the mid-1970s the staffs of the Conference and Policy Committee were housed together under a single staff director who administered their budgets jointly. Staff separation was begun during 1979–1980, while Senator Bob Packwood of Oregon was chairman of the conference, and completed under Senator James McClure of Idaho. Under Senator McClure's leadership in the 1980s, the conference began providing television, radio and graphics services for Republican senators. Senator Connie Mack, as conference chairman, in 1997 created the first digital Information Technology department to communicate the Republican agenda over the web.

== Meetings of Republican Conference ==
The form and frequency of conference meetings has depended upon leadership personalities and legislative circumstances. Since the late 1950s, the conference has met at the beginning of each United States Congress to elect the leadership, approve committee assignments, and attend to other organizational matters. Although other meetings are called from time to time to discuss pending issues, the weekly Policy Committee luncheons afford a regular forum for discussion among senators. As a former Republican Leader, Senator Everett M. Dirksen of Illinois, said in 1959:

When the Republican Policy Committee meets weekly, it is actually a meeting of the Republican Conference over the luncheon table, at which time we discuss all matters of pending business. Thus, so far as possible, all the information which is within the possession and the command of the leadership is freely diffused to every member.

At the time Senator Dirksen spoke, the elected party leadership included: chairman of the conference, secretary of the conference, floor leader, whip (now assistant floor leader), and chairman of the Policy Committee. On July 31, 1980, Conference rules were amended to make the chairman of the National Republican Senatorial Committee an elected position, a change which brought the rules into conformity with what had become custom.

== "Conference" versus "caucus" ==
The Republican Conference has never been a caucus in the dictionary sense, that is, a "partisan legislative group that uses caucus procedures to make decisions binding on its members." Even during the tense years of Reconstruction, Republican senators were not bound to vote according to conference decisions. In 1867, for example, when Senator Charles Sumner of Massachusetts refused to follow conference policy on an issue, and Senator William P. Fessenden of Maine charged, "you should not have voted on the subject [in Conference] if you did not mean to be bound by the decision of the majority," Sumner retorted, "I am a Senator of the United States," and no attempt was made to discipline him. Such independence was reiterated on March 12, 1925, when a resolution introduced by Senator Wesley L. Jones of Washington passed in the conference without objection:

To make clear and beyond question the long-settled policy of Republicans that our Conferences are not caucuses or of binding effect upon those participating therein but are meetings solely for the purpose of exchanging views to promote harmony and united action so far as possible.

Be It Resolved: That no Senator attending this Conference or any Conference held hereafter shall be deemed to be bound in any way by any action taken by such Conference, but he shall be entirely free to act upon any matter considered by the Conference as his judgment may dictate, and it shall not be necessary for any Senator to give notice of his intention to take action different from any recommended by the Conference."

== Floor leaders ==
| Congress | Leader | State | Took office | Left office | Majority Leader |
|---|---|---|---|---|---|
| 68th | Charles Curtis (1860–1936) | Kansas | November 28, 1924 | March 3, 1929 | Himself 1924–1929 |
| 69th | Charles Curtis (1860–1936) | Kansas | November 28, 1924 | March 3, 1929 | Himself 1924–1929 |
| 70th | Charles Curtis (1860–1936) | Kansas | November 28, 1924 | March 3, 1929 | Himself 1924–1929 |
| 71st | James Eli Watson (1874–1944) | Indiana | March 4, 1929 | March 4, 1933 | Himself 1929–1933 |
| 72nd | James Eli Watson (1874–1944) | Indiana | March 4, 1929 | March 4, 1933 | Himself 1929–1933 |
| 73rd | Charles L. McNary (1874–1944) | Oregon | March 4, 1933 | February 25, 1944 (Note: Warren Austin (Vermont) was acting Leader from 1940-1941.) | Robinson 1933–1937 |
| 74th | Charles L. McNary (1874–1944) | Oregon | March 4, 1933 | February 25, 1944 | Robinson 1933–1937 |
| 75th | Charles L. McNary (1874–1944) | Oregon | March 4, 1933 | February 25, 1944 | Barkley 1937–1947 |
| 76th | Charles L. McNary (1874–1944) | Oregon | March 4, 1933 | February 25, 1944 | Barkley 1937–1947 |
| 77th | Charles L. McNary (1874–1944) | Oregon | March 4, 1933 | February 25, 1944 | Barkley 1937–1947 |
| 78th | Charles L. McNary (1874–1944) | Oregon | March 4, 1933 | February 25, 1944 | Barkley 1937–1947 |
| 78th | Wallace H. White (1877–1952) | Maine | February 25, 1944 | January 3, 1949 | Barkley 1937–1947 |
| 79th | Wallace H. White (1877–1952) | Maine | February 25, 1944 | January 3, 1949 | Barkley 1937–1947 |
| 80th | Wallace H. White (1877–1952) | Maine | February 25, 1944 | January 3, 1949 | Himself 1947–1949 |
| 81st | Kenneth S. Wherry (1892–1951) | Nebraska | January 3, 1949 | November 29, 1951 | Lucas 1949–1951 |
| 82nd | Kenneth S. Wherry (1892–1951) | Nebraska | January 3, 1949 | November 29, 1951 | Lucas 1949–1951 |
| 82nd | Styles Bridges (1898–1961) | New Hampshire | January 8, 1952 | January 3, 1953 | McFarland 1951–1953 |
| 83rd | Robert A. Taft (1889–1953) | Ohio | January 3, 1953 | July 31, 1953 | Himself 1953 |
| 83rd | William Knowland (1908–1974) | California | August 3, 1953 | January 3, 1959 | Himself 1953–1955 |
| 84th | William Knowland (1908–1974) | California | August 3, 1953 | January 3, 1959 | Johnson 1955–1961 |
| 85th | William Knowland (1908–1974) | California | August 3, 1953 | January 3, 1959 | Johnson 1955–1961 |
| 86th | Everett Dirksen (1896–1969) | Illinois | January 3, 1959 | September 7, 1969 | Johnson 1955–1961 |
| 87th | Everett Dirksen (1896–1969) | Illinois | January 3, 1959 | September 7, 1969 | Mansfield 1961–1977 |
| 88th | Everett Dirksen (1896–1969) | Illinois | January 3, 1959 | September 7, 1969 | Mansfield 1961–1977 |
| 89th | Everett Dirksen (1896–1969) | Illinois | January 3, 1959 | September 7, 1969 | Mansfield 1961–1977 |
| 90th | Everett Dirksen (1896–1969) | Illinois | January 3, 1959 | September 7, 1969 | Mansfield 1961–1977 |
| 91st | Everett Dirksen (1896–1969) | Illinois | January 3, 1959 | September 7, 1969 | Mansfield 1961–1977 |
| 91st | Hugh Scott (1900–1994) | Pennsylvania | September 24, 1969 | January 3, 1977 | Mansfield 1961–1977 |
| 92nd | Hugh Scott (1900–1994) | Pennsylvania | September 24, 1969 | January 3, 1977 | Mansfield 1961–1977 |
| 93rd | Hugh Scott (1900–1994) | Pennsylvania | September 24, 1969 | January 3, 1977 | Mansfield 1961–1977 |
| 94th | Hugh Scott (1900–1994) | Pennsylvania | September 24, 1969 | January 3, 1977 | Mansfield 1961–1977 |
| 95th | Howard Baker (1925–2014) | Tennessee | January 3, 1977 | January 3, 1985 (Note: Ted Stevens (Alaska) was acting Leader from 1979-1980) | Byrd 1977–1981 |
| 96th | Howard Baker (1925–2014) | Tennessee | January 3, 1977 | January 3, 1985 | Byrd 1977–1981 |
| 97th | Howard Baker (1925–2014) | Tennessee | January 3, 1977 | January 3, 1985 | Himself 1981–1985 |
| 98th | Howard Baker (1925–2014) | Tennessee | January 3, 1977 | January 3, 1985 | Himself 1981–1985 |
| 99th | Bob Dole (1923–2021) | Kansas | January 3, 1985 | June 11, 1996 (Note: Resigned in order to run for President of the United States) | Himself 1985–1987 |
| 100th | Bob Dole (1923–2021) | Kansas | January 3, 1985 | June 11, 1996 | Byrd 1987–1989 |
| 101st | Bob Dole (1923–2021) | Kansas | January 3, 1985 | June 11, 1996 | Mitchell 1989–1995 |
| 102nd | Bob Dole (1923–2021) | Kansas | January 3, 1985 | June 11, 1996 | Mitchell 1989–1995 |
| 103rd | Bob Dole (1923–2021) | Kansas | January 3, 1985 | June 11, 1996 | Mitchell 1989–1995 |
| 104th | Bob Dole (1923–2021) | Kansas | January 3, 1985 | June 11, 1996 | Himself 1995–1996 |
| 104th | Trent Lott (born 1941) | Mississippi | June 11, 1996 | January 3, 2003 | Himself 1996–2001 |
| 105th | Trent Lott (born 1941) | Mississippi | June 11, 1996 | January 3, 2003 | Himself 1996–2001 |
| 106th | Trent Lott (born 1941) | Mississippi | June 11, 1996 | January 3, 2003 | Himself 1996–2001 |
| 107th | Trent Lott (born 1941) | Mississippi | June 11, 1996 | January 3, 2003 | Daschle 2001 |
| 107th | Trent Lott (born 1941) | Mississippi | June 11, 1996 | January 3, 2003 | Himself 2001 |
| 107th | Trent Lott (born 1941) | Mississippi | June 11, 1996 | January 3, 2003 | Daschle 2001–2003 |
| 108th | Bill Frist (born 1952) | Tennessee | January 3, 2003 | January 3, 2007 | Himself 2003–2007 |
| 109th | Bill Frist (born 1952) | Tennessee | January 3, 2003 | January 3, 2007 | Himself 2003–2007 |
| 110th | Mitch McConnell (born 1942) | Kentucky | January 3, 2007 | January 3, 2025 | Reid 2007–2015 |
| 111th | Mitch McConnell (born 1942) | Kentucky | January 3, 2007 | January 3, 2025 | Reid 2007–2015 |
| 112th | Mitch McConnell (born 1942) | Kentucky | January 3, 2007 | January 3, 2025 | Reid 2007–2015 |
| 113th | Mitch McConnell (born 1942) | Kentucky | January 3, 2007 | January 3, 2025 | Reid 2007–2015 |
| 114th | Mitch McConnell (born 1942) | Kentucky | January 3, 2007 | January 3, 2025 | Himself 2015–2021 |
| 115th | Mitch McConnell (born 1942) | Kentucky | January 3, 2007 | January 3, 2025 | Himself 2015–2021 |
| 116th | Mitch McConnell (born 1942) | Kentucky | January 3, 2007 | January 3, 2025 | Himself 2015–2021 |
| 117th | Mitch McConnell (born 1942) | Kentucky | January 3, 2007 | January 3, 2025 | Schumer 2021–2025 |
| 118th | Mitch McConnell (born 1942) | Kentucky | January 3, 2007 | January 3, 2025 | Schumer 2021–2025 |
| 119th | John Thune (born 1961) | South Dakota | January 3, 2025 | Incumbent | Himself 2025–present |

== List of conference chairmen and chairwoman ==
The Republican conference of the United States Senate chooses a conference chairperson. The office was created in the mid-19th century with the founding of the Republican party. The office of "party floor leader" was not created until 1925, and for twenty years, the Senate's Republican conference chairman was also the floor leader.

In recent years, the conference chair has come to be regarded as the third-ranking Republican in the Senate, behind the floor leader and whip. According to Congressional Quarterly, "The conference chairman manages the private meetings to elect floor leaders, handles distribution of committee assignments and helps set legislative priorities. The modern version drives the conference’s message, with broadcast studios for television and radio."

| Dates | Name | State | Notes |
|---|---|---|---|
| 1857 – December 1862 | John P. Hale | New Hampshire | |
| December 1862 – September 2, 1884 | Henry B. Anthony | Rhode Island | |
| September 2, 1884 – December 1885 | John Sherman | Ohio | |
| December 1885 – November 1, 1891 | George F. Edmunds | Vermont | |
| December 1891 – March 4, 1897 | John Sherman | Ohio | |
| March 4, 1897 – August 4, 1908 | William B. Allison | Iowa | |
| December 1908 – March 4, 1911 | Eugene Hale | Maine | |
| April 1911 – March 4, 1913 | Shelby Moore Cullom | Illinois | |
| March 4, 1913 – August 17, 1918 | Jacob Harold Gallinger | New Hampshire | |
| August 17, 1918 – November 9, 1924 | Henry Cabot Lodge | Massachusetts | |
| November 28, 1924 – March 4, 1929 | Charles Curtis | Kansas | Also Republican floor leader from 1925 |
| March 4, 1929 – March 4, 1933 | James Eli Watson | Indiana | Also Republican floor leader |
| March 4, 1933 – February 25, 1944 | Charles L. McNary | Oregon | Also Republican floor leader |
| February 25, 1944 – January 3, 1947; Acting: February 25, 1944 – January 3, 1945 | Arthur Vandenberg | Michigan | |
| January 3, 1947 – January 3, 1957 | Eugene Millikin | Colorado | |
| January 3, 1957 – January 3, 1967 | Leverett Saltonstall | Massachusetts | |
| January 3, 1967 – January 3, 1973 | Margaret Chase Smith | Maine | |
| January 3, 1973 – January 3, 1975 | Norris Cotton | New Hampshire | |
| January 3, 1975 – January 3, 1979 | Carl Curtis | Nebraska | |
| January 3, 1979 – January 3, 1981 | Bob Packwood | Oregon | |
| January 3, 1981 – January 3, 1985 | James A. McClure | Idaho | |
| January 3, 1985 – January 3, 1991 | John Chafee | Rhode Island | |
| January 3, 1991 – January 3, 1997 | Thad Cochran | Mississippi | |
| January 3, 1997 – January 3, 2001 | Connie Mack III | Florida | |
| January 3, 2001 – January 3, 2007 | Rick Santorum | Pennsylvania | |
| January 3, 2007 – December 19, 2007 | Jon Kyl | Arizona | |
| December 19, 2007 – January 26, 2012 | Lamar Alexander | Tennessee | |
| January 26, 2012 – January 3, 2019 | John Thune | South Dakota | |
| January 3, 2019 – January 3, 2025 | John Barrasso | Wyoming | |
| January 3, 2025 – present | Tom Cotton | Arkansas | |

== List of secretaries and vice chairmen ==
The vice chair of the Senate Republican Conference, also known previously as the conference secretary until 2001, is the fifth-ranking leadership position (behind the Policy Committee chair) within the Republican Party conference in the United States Senate. The vice-chair/secretary is responsible for keeping the minutes of the Senate Republican Conference and serves alongside the Senate Republican Conference chairperson. The vice chairman is James Lankford, serving since 2025.

Secretary of the Senate Republican Conference
| Congress | Officeholder | State | Term start | Term end |
|---|---|---|---|---|
| 62nd | Charles Curtis | Kansas | March 4, 1911 | March 4, 1913 |
| 63rd | William Kenyon | Iowa | March 4, 1913 | March 4, 1915 |
| 64th | James Wadsworth | New York | March 4, 1915 | March 4, 1927 |
| 65th | James Wadsworth | New York | March 4, 1915 | March 4, 1927 |
| 66th | James Wadsworth | New York | March 4, 1915 | March 4, 1927 |
| 67th | James Wadsworth | New York | March 4, 1915 | March 4, 1927 |
| 68th | James Wadsworth | New York | March 4, 1915 | March 4, 1927 |
| 69th | James Wadsworth | New York | March 4, 1915 | March 4, 1927 |
| 70th | Frederick Hale | Maine | March 4, 1927 | January 3, 1941 |
| 71st | Frederick Hale | Maine | March 4, 1927 | January 3, 1941 |
| 72nd | Frederick Hale | Maine | March 4, 1927 | January 3, 1941 |
| 73rd | Frederick Hale | Maine | March 4, 1927 | January 3, 1941 |
| 74th | Frederick Hale | Maine | March 4, 1927 | January 3, 1941 |
| 75th | Frederick Hale | Maine | March 4, 1927 | January 3, 1941 |
| 76th | Frederick Hale | Maine | March 4, 1927 | January 3, 1941 |
| 77th | Wallace H. White Jr. | Maine | January 3, 1941 | February 25, 1944 |
| 78th | Wallace H. White Jr. | Maine | January 3, 1941 | February 25, 1944 |
| 78th | Harold Burton | Ohio | February 25, 1944 | September 30, 1945 |
| 79th | Harold Burton | Ohio | February 25, 1944 | September 30, 1945 |
| 79th | Chan Gurney | South Dakota | September 30, 1945 | January 3, 1946 |
| 79th | Milton Young | North Dakota | January 3, 1946 | January 3, 1971 |
| 80th | Milton Young | North Dakota | January 3, 1946 | January 3, 1971 |
| 81st | Milton Young | North Dakota | January 3, 1946 | January 3, 1971 |
| 82nd | Milton Young | North Dakota | January 3, 1946 | January 3, 1971 |
| 83rd | Milton Young | North Dakota | January 3, 1946 | January 3, 1971 |
| 84th | Milton Young | North Dakota | January 3, 1946 | January 3, 1971 |
| 85th | Milton Young | North Dakota | January 3, 1946 | January 3, 1971 |
| 86th | Milton Young | North Dakota | January 3, 1946 | January 3, 1971 |
| 87th | Milton Young | North Dakota | January 3, 1946 | January 3, 1971 |
| 88th | Milton Young | North Dakota | January 3, 1946 | January 3, 1971 |
| 89th | Milton Young | North Dakota | January 3, 1946 | January 3, 1971 |
| 90th | Milton Young | North Dakota | January 3, 1946 | January 3, 1971 |
| 91st | Milton Young | North Dakota | January 3, 1946 | January 3, 1971 |
| 92nd | Norris Cotton | New Hampshire | January 3, 1971 | January 3, 1973 |
| 93rd | Wallace F. Bennett | Utah | January 3, 1973 | January 3, 1975 |
| 94th | Robert Stafford | Vermont | January 3, 1975 | January 3, 1977 |
| 95th | Clifford Hansen | Wyoming | January 3, 1975 | January 3, 1977 |
| 96th | Jake Garn | Utah | January 3, 1979 | January 3, 1985 |
| 97th | Jake Garn | Utah | January 3, 1979 | January 3, 1985 |
| 98th | Jake Garn | Utah | January 3, 1979 | January 3, 1985 |
| 99th | Thad Cochran | Mississippi | January 3, 1985 | January 3, 1991 |
| 100th | Thad Cochran | Mississippi | January 3, 1985 | January 3, 1991 |
| 101st | Thad Cochran | Mississippi | January 3, 1985 | January 3, 1991 |
| 102nd | Bob Kasten | Wisconsin | January 3, 1991 | January 3, 1993 |
| 103rd | Trent Lott | Mississippi | January 3, 1993 | January 3, 1995 |
| 104th | Connie Mack | Florida | January 3, 1995 | January 3, 1997 |
| 105th | Paul Coverdell | Georgia | January 3, 1997 | July 18, 2000 |
| 106th | Paul Coverdell | Georgia | January 3, 1997 | July 18, 2000 |
Vice Chair of the Senate Republican Conference
| Congress | Officeholder | State | Term start | Term end |
| 107th | Kay Bailey Hutchison | Texas | January 3, 2001 | January 3, 2007 |
| 108th | Kay Bailey Hutchison | Texas | January 3, 2001 | January 3, 2007 |
| 109th | Kay Bailey Hutchison | Texas | January 3, 2001 | January 3, 2007 |
| 110th | John Cornyn | Texas | January 3, 2007 | January 3, 2009 |
| 111th | John Thune | South Dakota | January 3, 2009 | June 17, 2009 |
| 111th | Lisa Murkowski | Alaska | June 17, 2009 | September 17, 2010 |
| 111th | John Barrasso | Wyoming | September 17, 2010 | January 26, 2012 |
| 112th | John Barrasso | Wyoming | September 17, 2010 | January 26, 2012 |
| 112th | Roy Blunt | Missouri | January 26, 2012 | January 3, 2019 |
| 113th | Roy Blunt | Missouri | January 26, 2012 | January 3, 2019 |
| 114th | Roy Blunt | Missouri | January 26, 2012 | January 3, 2019 |
| 115th | Roy Blunt | Missouri | January 26, 2012 | January 3, 2019 |
| 116th | Joni Ernst | Iowa | January 3, 2019 | January 3, 2023 |
| 117th | Joni Ernst | Iowa | January 3, 2019 | January 3, 2023 |
| 118th | Shelley Moore Capito | West Virginia | January 3, 2023 | January 3, 2025 |
| 119th | James Lankford | Oklahoma | January 3, 2025 | present |

== Members ==
Alabama

- Tommy Tuberville
- Katie Britt

Alaska

- Lisa Murkowski, Chair of the Senate Indian Affairs Committee
- Dan Sullivan

Arkansas

- John Boozman, Chair of the Senate Agriculture Committee
- Tom Cotton, Chair of the Senate Republican Conference and Chair of the Senate Intelligence Committee

Florida

- Rick Scott, Chair of the Senate Aging Committee
- Ashley Moody

Idaho

- Mike Crapo, Chair of the Senate Finance Committee
- Jim Risch, Chair of the Senate Foreign Relations Committee

Indiana

- Todd Young
- Jim Banks

Iowa

- Chuck Grassley, President Pro Tempore of the United States Senate and Chair of the Senate Judiciary Committee
- Joni Ernst, Chair of the Senate Small Business Committee

Kansas

- Jerry Moran, Chair of the Senate Veterans Affairs Committee
- Roger Marshall

Kentucky

- Mitch McConnell, Chair of the Senate Rules Committee
- Rand Paul, Chair of the Senate Homeland Security Committee

Louisiana

- Bill Cassidy, Chair of the Senate Health, Education, Labor, and Pensions Committee
- John Kennedy

Maine

- Susan Collins, Chair of the Senate Appropriations Committee

Mississippi

- Roger Wicker, Chair of the Senate Armed Services Committee
- Cindy Hyde-Smith

Missouri

- Eric Schmitt
- Josh Hawley

Montana

- Steve Daines
- Tim Sheehy

Nebraska

- Deb Fischer
- Pete Ricketts

North Carolina

- Thom Tillis
- Ted Budd

North Dakota

- John Hoeven
- Kevin Cramer

Ohio

- Bernie Moreno
- Jon Husted

Oklahoma

- James Lankford, Vice Chair of the Senate Republican Conference and Chair of the Senate Ethics Committee
- Alan Armstrong

Pennsylvania

- Dave McCormick

South Carolina

- Tim Scott, Chair of the Senate Banking Committee
- Darline Graham

South Dakota

- John Thune, Senate Majority Leader
- Mike Rounds

Tennessee

- Marsha Blackburn
- Bill Hagerty

Texas

- John Cornyn, Chair of the Senate Narcotics Caucus
- Ted Cruz, Chair of the Senate Commerce Committee

Utah

- Mike Lee, Chair of the Senate Energy Committee
- John Curtis

West Virginia

- Shelley Moore Capito, Chair of the Senate Environment Committee
- Jim Justice

Wisconsin

- Ron Johnson, Chair of the Senate Budget Committee

Wyoming

- John Barrasso, Senate Majority Whip
- Cynthia Lummis

== See also ==
- Senate Democratic Caucus
- House Republican Conference
- House Democratic Caucus
