= United States Senate Republican Policy Committee =

Policy research arm of the Republican Conference

The Senate Republican Policy Committee is the policy research arm of the Republican Conference. Its predecessor, the Senate Republican Steering Committee was formed in March 1944 after Leader Charles L. McNary's death. It became formally funded and renamed the Policy Committee in 1947 along with its Democratic counterpart, the Senate Democratic Policy Committee, after the Legislative Reorganization Act of 1946. Funding for staff of both party policy committees comes directly from the legislative branch.

According to Congressional Quarterly, "the Policy Committee is in effect a legislative think tank. The committee organizes the prominent Tuesday lunches with summaries of major bills, analysis of roll call votes and distribution of issue papers."

== List of chairs ==
| Congress | Name | State | Term length | Notes |
|---|---|---|---|---|
| 80th | Robert A. Taft | Ohio | Jan. 3, 1947 – Jan. 3, 1953 | Son of President Taft |
| 81st | Robert A. Taft | Ohio | Jan. 3, 1947 – Jan. 3, 1953 | Son of President Taft |
| 82nd | Robert A. Taft | Ohio | Jan. 3, 1947 – Jan. 3, 1953 | Son of President Taft |
| 83rd | William F. Knowland | California | Jan. 3, 1953 - Aug. 4, 1953 | |
| 83rd | Homer S. Ferguson | Michigan | Aug. 4, 1953 – Jan. 3, 1955 | |
| 84th | Styles Bridges | New Hampshire | Jan. 3, 1955 – Nov. 26, 1961 | |
| 85th | Styles Bridges | New Hampshire | Jan. 3, 1955 – Nov. 26, 1961 | |
| 86th | Styles Bridges | New Hampshire | Jan. 3, 1955 – Nov. 26, 1961 | |
| 87th | Styles Bridges | New Hampshire | Jan. 3, 1955 – Nov. 26, 1961 | |
| 87th | Bourke B. Hickenlooper | Iowa | Jan. 3, 1962 – Jan. 3, 1969 | |
| 88th | Bourke B. Hickenlooper | Iowa | Jan. 3, 1962 – Jan. 3, 1969 | |
| 89th | Bourke B. Hickenlooper | Iowa | Jan. 3, 1962 – Jan. 3, 1969 | |
| 90th | Bourke B. Hickenlooper | Iowa | Jan. 3, 1962 – Jan. 3, 1969 | |
| 91st | Gordon Allott | Colorado | Jan. 3, 1969 – Jan. 3, 1973 | |
| 92nd | Gordon Allott | Colorado | Jan. 3, 1969 – Jan. 3, 1973 | |
| 93rd | John Tower | Texas | Jan. 3, 1973 – Jan. 3, 1985 | |
| 94th | John Tower | Texas | Jan. 3, 1973 – Jan. 3, 1985 | |
| 95th | John Tower | Texas | Jan. 3, 1973 – Jan. 3, 1985 | |
| 96th | John Tower | Texas | Jan. 3, 1973 – Jan. 3, 1985 | |
| 97th | John Tower | Texas | Jan. 3, 1973 – Jan. 3, 1985 | |
| 98th | John Tower | Texas | Jan. 3, 1973 – Jan. 3, 1985 | |
| 99th | William L. Armstrong | Colorado | Jan. 3, 1985 – Jan. 3, 1991 | |
| 100th | William L. Armstrong | Colorado | Jan. 3, 1985 – Jan. 3, 1991 | |
| 101st | William L. Armstrong | Colorado | Jan. 3, 1985 – Jan. 3, 1991 | |
| 102nd | Don Nickles | Oklahoma | Jan. 3, 1991 – June 12, 1996 | |
| 103rd | Don Nickles | Oklahoma | Jan. 3, 1991 – June 12, 1996 | |
| 104th | Don Nickles | Oklahoma | Jan. 3, 1991 – June 12, 1996 | |
| 104th | Larry Craig | Idaho | June 12, 1996 – Jan. 3, 2003 | |
| 105th | Larry Craig | Idaho | June 12, 1996 – Jan. 3, 2003 | |
| 106th | Larry Craig | Idaho | June 12, 1996 – Jan. 3, 2003 | |
| 107th | Larry Craig | Idaho | June 12, 1996 – Jan. 3, 2003 | |
| 108th | Jon Kyl | Arizona | Jan. 3, 2003 – Jan. 3, 2007 | |
| 109th | Jon Kyl | Arizona | Jan. 3, 2003 – Jan. 3, 2007 | |
| 110th | Kay Bailey Hutchison | Texas | Jan. 3, 2007 – Jan. 3, 2009 | First woman to hold position |
| 111th | John Ensign | Nevada | Jan. 3, 2009 - June 17, 2009 | Resigned |
| 111th | John Thune | South Dakota | June 17, 2009 – Jan. 26, 2012 | |
| 112th | John Thune | South Dakota | June 17, 2009 – Jan. 26, 2012 | |
| 112th | John Barrasso | Wyoming | Jan. 26, 2012 – Jan. 3, 2019 | |
| 113th | John Barrasso | Wyoming | Jan. 26, 2012 – Jan. 3, 2019 | |
| 114th | John Barrasso | Wyoming | Jan. 26, 2012 – Jan. 3, 2019 | |
| 115th | John Barrasso | Wyoming | Jan. 26, 2012 – Jan. 3, 2019 | |
| 116th | Roy Blunt | Missouri | Jan. 3, 2019 – Jan. 3, 2023 | |
| 117th | Roy Blunt | Missouri | Jan. 3, 2019 – Jan. 3, 2023 | |
| 118th | Joni Ernst | Iowa | Jan. 3, 2023 - Jan. 3, 2025 | |
| 119th | Shelley Moore Capito | West Virginia | Jan. 3, 2025 - present | |
