= United States Senate Democratic Policy Committee =

Committee responsible for the creation of new U.S. Democratic Party policy proposals

The United States Senate Democratic Policy Committee is responsible for the creation of new United States Democratic Party policy proposals, supporting Democratic senators with legislative research, developing reports on legislation and policy, conducting oversight hearings, monitoring roll call votes, differentiating between Democratic and Republican positions, and building party unity.

The committee was established in 1947, by an act signed by President Harry S. Truman, alongside its Republican counterpart. From 1947 to 2000, the Democratic leader was also the policy committee chairman. From 1989 to 1999, there was a co-chairman. Starting in 1999, the co-chairman was dropped and the position of policy committee chairman became a separate position elected by the Senate Democratic Caucus. The floor leader served as committee chair until 1989, when one of the co-chairs remained leader (Mitchell through 1995 and then Daschle until 1999).

== List of chairs ==
The committee chairperson is the No. 3 member of the Democratic party leadership of the United States Senate, after the party leader and whip.

Chair of the Policy Committee
Congress	Chair(s)	Term
80th	Alben W. Barkley (KY)	1947–1949
81st	Scott W. Lucas (IL)	1949–1951
82nd	Ernest McFarland (AZ)	1951–1953
83rd	Lyndon Johnson (TX)	1953–1961
84th	Lyndon Johnson (TX)	1953–1961
85th	Lyndon Johnson (TX)	1953–1961
86th	Lyndon Johnson (TX)	1953–1961
87th	Mike Mansfield (MT)	1961–1977
88th	Mike Mansfield (MT)	1961–1977
89th	Mike Mansfield (MT)	1961–1977
90th	Mike Mansfield (MT)	1961–1977
91st	Mike Mansfield (MT)	1961–1977
92nd	Mike Mansfield (MT)	1961–1977
93rd	Mike Mansfield (MT)	1961–1977
94th	Mike Mansfield (MT)	1961–1977
95th	Robert Byrd (WV)	1977–1989
96th	Robert Byrd (WV)	1977–1989
97th	Robert Byrd (WV)	1977–1989
98th	Robert Byrd (WV)	1977–1989
99th	Robert Byrd (WV)	1977–1989
100th	Robert Byrd (WV)	1977–1989
101st	George J. Mitchell (ME)	1989–1995
102nd	George J. Mitchell (ME)	1989–1995
103rd	George J. Mitchell (ME)	1989–1995
104th	Tom Daschle (SD)	1995-1999
105th	Tom Daschle (SD)	1995-1999
106th	Byron Dorgan (ND)	1999-2011
107th	Byron Dorgan (ND)	1999-2011
108th	Byron Dorgan (ND)	1999-2011
109th	Byron Dorgan (ND)	1999-2011
110th	Byron Dorgan (ND)	1999-2011
111th	Byron Dorgan (ND)	1999-2011
112th	Chuck Schumer (NY)	2011-2017
113th	Chuck Schumer (NY)	2011-2017
114th	Chuck Schumer (NY)	2011-2017
115th	Debbie Stabenow (MI)	2017-2019
Chair of the Policy & Communications Committee
Congress	Chair(s)	Term
116th	Debbie Stabenow (MI)	2019-2025
117th	Debbie Stabenow (MI)	2019-2025
118th	Debbie Stabenow (MI)	2019-2025
Chair of the Steering & Policy Committee
Congress	Chair(s)	Term
119th	Amy Klobuchar (MN)	2025–present

== Vice chairs ==
Co-Chair of Policy
Congress	Co-Chair(s)	Term
101st	Tom Daschle (SD)	1989-1995
102nd	Tom Daschle (SD)	1989-1995
103rd	Tom Daschle (SD)	1989-1995
104th	Harry Reid (NV)	1995-1999
105th	Harry Reid (NV)	1995-1999
Vice Chair of Policy Committee
Congress	Vice Chair(s)	Term
112th	Debbie Stabenow (MI)	2011–2017
113th	Debbie Stabenow (MI)	2011–2017
114th	Debbie Stabenow (MI)	2011–2017
115th	Joe Manchin (WV)	2017-2019
Vice Chair of Policy & Communications Committee
Congress	Vice Chair(s)	Term
116th	Joe Manchin (WV)	2019–2021
117th	Joe Manchin (WV); Cory Booker (NJ)	2021–2025
118th	Joe Manchin (WV); Cory Booker (NJ)	2021–2025
Vice Chair of Steering & Policy Committee
Congress	Vice Chair(s)	Term
119th	Jeanne Shaheen (NH)	2025–present

== Historical Committee Rosters ==
=== 113th Congress members ===
Members
Senator	State
Chuck Schumer, Chairman	New York
Jack Reed, Regional Chair	Rhode Island
Mary Landrieu, Regional Chair	Louisiana
Patty Murray, Regional Chair	Washington
Harry Reid	Nevada
Dianne Feinstein	California
Ron Wyden	Oregon
Tim Johnson	South Dakota
Bill Nelson	Florida
Tom Carper	Delaware
Barbara Mikulski	Maryland
Sherrod Brown	Ohio
ex officio
Dick Durbin, Democratic Whip	Illinois
Patty Murray, Assistant Democratic Leader	Washington
