= Senate Democratic Caucus =

Formal organization of U.S. Democratic Senators

Senate Democratic Conference
- Part of: United States Senate
- Chair and Floor Leader: Chuck Schumer (NY)
- Floor Whip: Dick Durbin (IL)
- Vice Chairs: Mark Warner (VA); Elizabeth Warren (MA)
- Secretary: Tammy Baldwin (WI)
- Ideology: Liberalism
- Political position: Center to center-left
- Affiliation: Democratic Party
- Colors: Blue
- Seats: 47 / 100

Election symbol

Website
- democrats.senate.gov

The Democratic Conference of the United States Senate, sometimes referred to as the Senate Democratic Caucus, Democratic Conference, or simply Senate Democrats, is the formal organization of all senators who are part of the Democratic Party in the United States Senate. For the makeup of the 119th Congress, the caucus additionally includes two independent senators (Bernie Sanders of Vermont and Angus King of Maine) who caucus with the Democrats, bringing the current total to 47 members. The central organizational front for Democrats in the Senate, its primary function is communicating the party's message to all of its members under a single banner. The present chair of the Senate Democratic Caucus is Senate Minority Leader Chuck Schumer of New York.

== Current leadership ==
Effective with the start of the 119th Congress, the conference leadership is as follows:

- Democratic Leader Chuck Schumer
- Democratic Whip Dick Durbin
- Chair of Steering and Policy Committee Amy Klobuchar
- Chair of Strategic Communications Committee Cory Booker
- Vice Chair of the Caucus Elizabeth Warren
- Vice Chair of the Caucus Mark Warner
- Chair of Outreach Bernie Sanders
- Caucus Secretary Tammy Baldwin
- Vice Chair of Outreach Catherine Cortez Masto
- Deputy Caucus Secretary Brian Schatz (Note: Concurrently serves as Chief Deputy Whip on Durbin's Whip Operations Team.)
- Deputy Caucus Secretary Chris Murphy
- Vice Chair of Steering and Policy Committee Jeanne Shaheen (Note: According to the Rules of the Democratic Conference section VI.1 "Officers of the Conference" members included 2 vice chairs of the Policy & Communications Committee now restructured into 2 committees; Steering & Policy, vice chaired by Jeanne Shaheen and Strategic Communications, vice chaired by Tina Smith)
- Vice Chair of Strategic Communications Committee Tina Smith

== History ==
The conference was formally organized on March 6, 1903, electing a chair to preside over its members and a secretary to keep minutes. Until that time, this caucus was often disorganized, philosophically divided and had neither firm written rules of governance nor a clear mission.

== Chairs ==
Since Oscar Underwood's election in 1920, the chair of the Senate Democratic Caucus has also concurrently served as the floor leader as part of an unwritten tradition.

Congress	Leader	State	Took office	Left office	Majority Leader
43rd	John W. Stevenson (1812–1886)	Kentucky	December 1873	March 4, 1877	Unknown (Note: Although the Senate Majority Leader for this Congress is unknown, the Republican Party had a majority.)
44th	John W. Stevenson (1812–1886)	Kentucky	December 1873	March 4, 1877	Unknown
45th	William A. Wallace (1827–1896)	Pennsylvania	March 4, 1877	March 4, 1881	Unknown
46th	William A. Wallace (1827–1896)	Pennsylvania	March 4, 1877	March 4, 1881	Unknown (Note: Although the Senate Majority Leader for this Congress is unknown, the Democratic Party had a majority.)
47th	George H. Pendleton (1825–1889)	Ohio	March 4, 1881	March 4, 1885	Unknown (Note: The Republican Party had a majority in the Senate for the first special Senate session of the 47th Congress from March to May 1881. Beginning with the second special Senate session in October 1881 and continuing until the end of the 47th Congress, the Senate was split between parties.)
48th	George H. Pendleton (1825–1889)	Ohio	March 4, 1881	March 4, 1885	Unknown
49th	James B. Beck (1822–1890)	Kentucky	March 4, 1885	May 3, 1890 (Note: Died in office.)	Unknown
50th	James B. Beck (1822–1890)	Kentucky	March 4, 1885	May 3, 1890	Unknown
51st	James B. Beck (1822–1890)	Kentucky	March 4, 1885	May 3, 1890	Unknown
51st	Arthur Pue Gorman (1839–1906)	Maryland	May 3, 1890	April 29, 1898 (Note: Resigned from office.)	Unknown
52nd	Arthur Pue Gorman (1839–1906)	Maryland	May 3, 1890	April 29, 1898	Unknown
53rd	Arthur Pue Gorman (1839–1906)	Maryland	May 3, 1890	April 29, 1898	Himself 1893–1895
54th	Arthur Pue Gorman (1839–1906)	Maryland	May 3, 1890	April 29, 1898	Unknown
55th	Arthur Pue Gorman (1839–1906)	Maryland	May 3, 1890	April 29, 1898	Unknown
55th	David Turpie (1828–1909)	Indiana	April 29, 1898	March 4, 1899	Unknown
56th	James Kimbrough Jones (1839–1908)	Arkansas	December 1899	March 4, 1903	Unknown
57th	James Kimbrough Jones (1839–1908)	Arkansas	December 1899	March 4, 1903	Unknown
58th	Arthur Pue Gorman (1839–1906)	Maryland	March 4, 1903	June 4, 1906	Unknown
59th	Arthur Pue Gorman (1839–1906)	Maryland	March 4, 1903	June 4, 1906	Unknown
59th	Joseph Clay Stiles Blackburn (1838–1918)	Kentucky	June 4, 1906	March 4, 1907	Unknown
60th	Charles Allen Culberson (1855–1925)	Texas	December 1907	December 9, 1909	Unknown
61st	Charles Allen Culberson (1855–1925)	Texas	December 1907	December 9, 1909	Unknown
61st	Hernando Money (1839–1912)	Mississippi	December 9, 1909	March 4, 1911	Unknown
62nd	Thomas S. Martin (1847–1919)	Virginia	April 1911	March 4, 1913	Unknown
63rd	John W. Kern (1849–1917)	Indiana	March 4, 1913	March 4, 1917	Himself 1913–1917
64th	John W. Kern (1849–1917)	Indiana	March 4, 1913	March 4, 1917	Himself 1913–1917
65th	Thomas S. Martin (1847–1919)	Virginia	March 4, 1917	November 12, 1919	Himself 1917–1919
66th	Thomas S. Martin (1847–1919)	Virginia	March 4, 1917	November 12, 1919	Lodge 1919–1924
66th	Gilbert Hitchcock (Note: Acting chair.) (1859–1934)	Nebraska	November 12, 1919	April 27, 1920	Lodge 1919–1924
66th	Oscar Underwood (1862–1929)	Alabama	April 27, 1920	December 3, 1923	Lodge 1919–1924
67th	Oscar Underwood (1862–1929)	Alabama	April 27, 1920	December 3, 1923	Lodge 1919–1924
68th	Oscar Underwood (1862–1929)	Alabama	April 27, 1920	December 3, 1923	Lodge 1919–1924
68th	Joseph Taylor Robinson (1872–1937)	Arkansas	December 3, 1923	July 14, 1937	Curtis 1924–1929
69th	Joseph Taylor Robinson (1872–1937)	Arkansas	December 3, 1923	July 14, 1937	Curtis 1924–1929
70th	Joseph Taylor Robinson (1872–1937)	Arkansas	December 3, 1923	July 14, 1937	Curtis 1924–1929
71st	Joseph Taylor Robinson (1872–1937)	Arkansas	December 3, 1923	July 14, 1937	Watson 1929–1933
72nd	Joseph Taylor Robinson (1872–1937)	Arkansas	December 3, 1923	July 14, 1937	Watson 1929–1933
73rd	Joseph Taylor Robinson (1872–1937)	Arkansas	December 3, 1923	July 14, 1937	Himself 1933–1937
74th	Joseph Taylor Robinson (1872–1937)	Arkansas	December 3, 1923	July 14, 1937	Himself 1933–1937
75th	Joseph Taylor Robinson (1872–1937)	Arkansas	December 3, 1923	July 14, 1937	Himself 1933–1937
75th	Alben W. Barkley (1877–1956)	Kentucky	July 14, 1937	January 3, 1949 (Note: Resigned to become Vice President of the United States.)	Himself 1937–1947
76th	Alben W. Barkley (1877–1956)	Kentucky	July 14, 1937	January 3, 1949	Himself 1937–1947
77th	Alben W. Barkley (1877–1956)	Kentucky	July 14, 1937	January 3, 1949	Himself 1937–1947
78th	Alben W. Barkley (1877–1956)	Kentucky	July 14, 1937	January 3, 1949	Himself 1937–1947
79th	Alben W. Barkley (1877–1956)	Kentucky	July 14, 1937	January 3, 1949	Himself 1937–1947
80th	Alben W. Barkley (1877–1956)	Kentucky	July 14, 1937	January 3, 1949	White 1947–1949
81st	Scott W. Lucas (1892–1968)	Illinois	January 3, 1949	January 3, 1951	Himself 1949–1951
82nd	Ernest McFarland (1894–1984)	Arizona	January 3, 1951	January 3, 1953	Himself 1951–1953
83rd	Lyndon B. Johnson (1908–1973)	Texas	January 3, 1953	January 3, 1961	Taft 1953
83rd	Lyndon B. Johnson (1908–1973)	Texas	January 3, 1953	January 3, 1961	Knowland 1953–1955
84th	Lyndon B. Johnson (1908–1973)	Texas	January 3, 1953	January 3, 1961	Himself 1955–1961
85th	Lyndon B. Johnson (1908–1973)	Texas	January 3, 1953	January 3, 1961	Himself 1955–1961
86th	Lyndon B. Johnson (1908–1973)	Texas	January 3, 1953	January 3, 1961	Himself 1955–1961
87th	Mike Mansfield (1903–2001)	Montana	January 3, 1961	January 3, 1977	Himself 1961–1977
88th	Mike Mansfield (1903–2001)	Montana	January 3, 1961	January 3, 1977	Himself 1961–1977
89th	Mike Mansfield (1903–2001)	Montana	January 3, 1961	January 3, 1977	Himself 1961–1977
90th	Mike Mansfield (1903–2001)	Montana	January 3, 1961	January 3, 1977	Himself 1961–1977
91st	Mike Mansfield (1903–2001)	Montana	January 3, 1961	January 3, 1977	Himself 1961–1977
92nd	Mike Mansfield (1903–2001)	Montana	January 3, 1961	January 3, 1977	Himself 1961–1977
93rd	Mike Mansfield (1903–2001)	Montana	January 3, 1961	January 3, 1977	Himself 1961–1977
94th	Mike Mansfield (1903–2001)	Montana	January 3, 1961	January 3, 1977	Himself 1961–1977
95th	Robert Byrd (1917–2010)	West Virginia	January 3, 1977	January 3, 1989	Himself 1977–1981
96th	Robert Byrd (1917–2010)	West Virginia	January 3, 1977	January 3, 1989	Himself 1977–1981
97th	Robert Byrd (1917–2010)	West Virginia	January 3, 1977	January 3, 1989	Baker 1981–1985
98th	Robert Byrd (1917–2010)	West Virginia	January 3, 1977	January 3, 1989	Baker 1981–1985
99th	Robert Byrd (1917–2010)	West Virginia	January 3, 1977	January 3, 1989	Dole 1985–1987
100th	Robert Byrd (1917–2010)	West Virginia	January 3, 1977	January 3, 1989	Himself 1987–1989
101st	George J. Mitchell (born 1933)	Maine	January 3, 1989	January 3, 1995	Himself 1989–1995
102nd	George J. Mitchell (born 1933)	Maine	January 3, 1989	January 3, 1995	Himself 1989–1995
103rd	George J. Mitchell (born 1933)	Maine	January 3, 1989	January 3, 1995	Himself 1989–1995
104th	Tom Daschle (born 1947)	South Dakota	January 3, 1995	January 3, 2005	Dole 1995–1996
104th	Tom Daschle (born 1947)	South Dakota	January 3, 1995	January 3, 2005	Lott 1996–2001
105th	Tom Daschle (born 1947)	South Dakota	January 3, 1995	January 3, 2005	Lott 1996–2001
106th	Tom Daschle (born 1947)	South Dakota	January 3, 1995	January 3, 2005	Lott 1996–2001
107th	Tom Daschle (born 1947)	South Dakota	January 3, 1995	January 3, 2005	Himself 2001
107th	Tom Daschle (born 1947)	South Dakota	January 3, 1995	January 3, 2005	Lott 2001
107th	Tom Daschle (born 1947)	South Dakota	January 3, 1995	January 3, 2005	Himself 2001–2003
108th	Tom Daschle (born 1947)	South Dakota	January 3, 1995	January 3, 2005	Frist 2003–2007
109th	Harry Reid (1939–2021)	Nevada	January 3, 2005	January 3, 2017	Frist 2003–2007
110th	Harry Reid (1939–2021)	Nevada	January 3, 2005	January 3, 2017	Himself 2007–2015
111th	Harry Reid (1939–2021)	Nevada	January 3, 2005	January 3, 2017	Himself 2007–2015
112th	Harry Reid (1939–2021)	Nevada	January 3, 2005	January 3, 2017	Himself 2007–2015
113th	Harry Reid (1939–2021)	Nevada	January 3, 2005	January 3, 2017	Himself 2007–2015
114th	Harry Reid (1939–2021)	Nevada	January 3, 2005	January 3, 2017	McConnell 2015–2021
115th	Chuck Schumer (born 1950)	New York	January 3, 2017	Incumbent	McConnell 2015–2021
116th	Chuck Schumer (born 1950)	New York	January 3, 2017	Incumbent	McConnell 2015–2021
117th	Chuck Schumer (born 1950)	New York	January 3, 2017	Incumbent	McConnell 2015–2021
117th	Chuck Schumer (born 1950)	New York	January 3, 2017	Incumbent	Himself 2021–2025
118th	Chuck Schumer (born 1950)	New York	January 3, 2017	Incumbent	Himself 2021–2025
119th	Chuck Schumer (born 1950)	New York	January 3, 2017	Incumbent	Thune 2025–present

== Vice chairs ==
Bob Kerrey was appointed as the first vice chair of Senate Democrats for the 106th Congress. Harry Reid later converted the role as an elected leadership position for Chuck Schumer after his successful term as chair of the Democratic Senatorial Campaign Committee, and Schumer later ascended to Reid's position as leader following the 2016 elections. The position was then split, with one co-chair awarded to Mark Warner and the other awarded to Elizabeth Warren.

Name	State	Start	End
Bob Kerrey	Nebraska	January 3, 1999	January 3, 2001
Chuck Schumer	New York	January 3, 2007	January 3, 2017
Mark Warner	Virginia	January 3, 2017	present
Elizabeth Warren	Massachusetts	January 3, 2017	present

== Conference secretary ==
The United States Senate Democratic Conference secretary, also called the caucus secretary was previously considered the number-three position, behind the party's floor leader and the party's whip, until in 2006, when Democratic leader Harry Reid created the new position of Vice-Chairman of the caucus. Now, the secretary is the fourth-highest ranking position. The conference secretary is responsible for taking notes and aiding the party leadership when senators of the party meet or caucus together.

The first conference secretary was Thomas B. Turley.

The current conference secretary is Sen. Tammy Baldwin of Wisconsin, who assumed the office in January 2017.

Congress	Secretary	State	Term start	Term end
55th	Thomas B. Turley	Tennessee	1897	1901
56th	Thomas B. Turley	Tennessee	1897	1901
57th
58th	Edward W. Carmack	Tennessee	March 6, 1903	March 3, 1907
59th	Edward W. Carmack	Tennessee	March 6, 1903	March 3, 1907
60th	Robert Owen	Oklahoma	December 3, 1907 (Note: The 60th Congress began on March 4, 1907; however Owen did not take office until the start of the 1st Session of the 60th Congress on December 2, 1907.)	March 4, 1911
61st	Robert Owen	Oklahoma	December 3, 1907	March 4, 1911
62nd	William E. Chilton	Virginia	March 4, 1911	March 4, 1913
63rd	Willard Saulsbury Jr.	Delaware	March 4, 1913	March 3, 1915
64th	Willard Saulsbury Jr.	Delaware	March 3, 1915	December 14, 1916
64th	Key Pittman (Acting)	Nevada	December 14, 1916	March 3, 1917
65th	William H. King	Utah	March 4, 1917	March 3, 1927
66th	William H. King	Utah	March 4, 1917	March 3, 1927
67th	William H. King	Utah	March 4, 1917	March 3, 1927
68th	William H. King	Utah	March 4, 1917	March 3, 1927
69th	William H. King	Utah	March 4, 1917	March 3, 1927
70th	Hugo Black	Alabama	March 4, 1927	January 3, 1937
71st	Hugo Black	Alabama	March 4, 1927	January 3, 1937
72nd	Hugo Black	Alabama	March 4, 1927	January 3, 1937
73rd	Hugo Black	Alabama	March 4, 1927	January 3, 1937
74th	Hugo Black	Alabama	March 4, 1927	January 3, 1937
75th	Joshua B. Lee	Oklahoma	January 3, 1937	January 3, 1943
76th	Joshua B. Lee	Oklahoma	January 3, 1937	January 3, 1943
77th	Joshua B. Lee	Oklahoma	January 3, 1937	January 3, 1943
78th	Francis T. Maloney	Connecticut	January 3, 1943	January 3, 1945
79th	Brien McMahon	Connecticut	January 3, 1945	July 28, 1952
80th	Brien McMahon	Connecticut	January 3, 1945	July 28, 1952
81st	Brien McMahon	Connecticut	January 3, 1945	July 28, 1952
82nd	Brien McMahon	Connecticut	January 3, 1945	July 28, 1952
83rd	Thomas Hennings	Missouri	January 3, 1953	January 3, 1959
84th	Thomas Hennings	Missouri	January 3, 1953	January 3, 1959
85th	Thomas Hennings	Missouri	January 3, 1953	January 3, 1959
86th	Thomas Hennings	Missouri	January 3, 1959	September 13, 1960
86th	George Smathers	Florida	September 3, 1960	January 3, 1961
87th	George Smathers	Florida	January 3, 1961	January 3, 1967
88th	George Smathers	Florida	January 3, 1961	January 3, 1967
89th	George Smathers	Florida	January 3, 1961	January 3, 1967
90th	Robert Byrd	West Virginia	January 3, 1967	January 3, 1971
91st	Robert Byrd	West Virginia	January 3, 1967	January 3, 1971
92nd	Ted Moss	Utah	January 3, 1971	January 3, 1977
93rd	Ted Moss	Utah	January 3, 1971	January 3, 1977
94th	Ted Moss	Utah	January 3, 1971	January 3, 1977
95th	Daniel Inouye	Hawaii	January 3, 1977	January 3, 1989
96th	Daniel Inouye	Hawaii	January 3, 1977	January 3, 1989
97th	Daniel Inouye	Hawaii	January 3, 1977	January 3, 1989
98th	Daniel Inouye	Hawaii	January 3, 1977	January 3, 1989
99th	Daniel Inouye	Hawaii	January 3, 1977	January 3, 1989
100th	Daniel Inouye	Hawaii	January 3, 1977	January 3, 1989
101st	David Pryor	Arkansas	January 3, 1989	January 3, 1995
102nd	David Pryor	Arkansas	January 3, 1989	January 3, 1995
103rd	David Pryor	Arkansas	January 3, 1989	January 3, 1995
104th	Barbara Mikulski	Maryland	January 3, 1995	January 3, 2005
105th	Barbara Mikulski	Maryland	January 3, 1995	January 3, 2005
106th	Barbara Mikulski	Maryland	January 3, 1995	January 3, 2005
107th	Barbara Mikulski	Maryland	January 3, 1995	January 3, 2005
108th	Barbara Mikulski	Maryland	January 3, 1995	January 3, 2005
109th	Debbie Stabenow	Michigan	January 3, 2005	January 3, 2007
110th	Patty Murray	Washington	January 3, 2007	January 3, 2017
111th	Patty Murray	Washington	January 3, 2007	January 3, 2017
112th	Patty Murray	Washington	January 3, 2007	January 3, 2017
113th	Patty Murray	Washington	January 3, 2007	January 3, 2017
114th	Patty Murray	Washington	January 3, 2007	January 3, 2017
115th	Tammy Baldwin	Wisconsin	January 3, 2017	Incumbent
116th	Tammy Baldwin	Wisconsin	January 3, 2017	Incumbent
117th	Tammy Baldwin	Wisconsin	January 3, 2017	Incumbent
118th	Tammy Baldwin	Wisconsin	January 3, 2017	Incumbent
119th	Tammy Baldwin	Wisconsin	January 3, 2017	Incumbent

=== Deputy caucus secretary ===
On December 8, 2022, Sen. Brian Schatz of Hawaii was elected to the newly created position of deputy caucus secretary, assuming the office at the beginning of the 118th Congress on January 3, 2023. This was an elevation from his previous leadership role as Senate Democratic chief deputy whip. On January 3, 2025, Chris Murphy was also appointed to this position.

== See also ==
- Senate Republican Conference
- House Democratic Caucus
- House Republican Conference

== Bibliography ==
- Donald A. Ritchie (ed) (1999). Minutes of the Senate Democratic Conference: Fifty-eighth through Eighty-eighth Congress, 1903-1964. Washington, D.C. GPO. Available online in PDF or text format.
