= 2030 United States Senate elections =

Senate election for the 122nd US Congress

- November 5, 2030
- Class 1

33 of the 100 seats in the United States Senate 51 (Note: Majority control in an evenly divided Senate is determined by the Vice President of the United States, who has the power to break tied votes in their constitutional capacity as President of the Senate; accordingly, Senate control requires 51 seats or 50 seats with control of the vice presidency.) seats needed for a majority
- Map of the incumbents: Democratic incumbent Republican incumbent Independent incumbent Incumbent to be determined No election
Incumbent Majority Leader
TBD in 2028

The 2030 United States Senate elections will be held on November 5, 2030, with 33 of the 100 seats in the Senate being contested in regular elections, the winners of which will serve six-year terms in the United States Congress from January 3, 2031, to January 3, 2037, which will include the last two years of the 2028 presidential election winner's term, and the entirety of the 2032 presidential election winner's term. Senators are divided into three groups or classes whose terms are staggered so that a different class is elected every two years. Class 1 senators were last elected in 2024 and will be up for election again in 2030. Two-thirds of the states are up for election for this year.

== Partisan composition ==
All 33 Class 1 Senate seats are up for election in 2030; Class 1 currently consists of 14 Republicans, 17 Democrats, and two independents. If vacancies occur in Class 2 or Class 3 Senate seats, that state might require a special election to take place during the 121st Congress, possibly concurrently with the other 2030 Senate elections.

Democrats are defending four seats in states won by Donald Trump in 2024 (Arizona, Michigan, Nevada, and Wisconsin), however one of these states was won by a Democratic Senate candidate in 2026 (Michigan), and all four of them elected Democratic governors that year. Republicans are defending no seats in states won by Kamala Harris in 2024, but three states won by Democrats in 2026 (Mississippi, Ohio and Texas), and an additional state which elected a Democratic governor (Pennsylvania).

=== Before the elections ===
Each block indicates an incumbent senator's actions going into the election.

D_{1}	D_{2}	D_{3}	D_{4}	D_{5}	D_{6}	D_{7}	D_{8}	D_{9}	D_{10}
D_{20} Calif. Undeclared	D_{19} Arizona; Undeclared	D_{18}	D_{17}	D_{16}	D_{15}	D_{14}	D_{13}	D_{12}	D_{11}
D_{21} Conn. Undeclared	D_{22} Del. Undeclared	D_{23} Hawaii; Undeclared	D_{24} Md. Undeclared	D_{25} Mass. Undeclared	D_{26} Mich. Undeclared	D_{27} Nevada; Undeclared	D_{28} N.J. Undeclared	D_{29} N.M. Undeclared	D_{30} N.Y. Undeclared
TBD in 2028	TBD in 2028	TBD in 2028	Minn. TBD in 2027	I_{2} Vt. Undeclared	I_{1} Maine; Undeclared	D_{34} Wis. Undeclared	D_{33} Wash. Undeclared	D_{32} Va. Undeclared	D_{31} R.I. Undeclared
TBD in 2028	TBD in 2028	TBD in 2028	TBD in 2028	TBD in 2028	TBD in 2028	TBD in 2028	TBD in 2028	TBD in 2028	TBD in 2028
Majority →									TBD in 2028
TBD in 2028	TBD in 2028	TBD in 2028	TBD in 2028	TBD in 2028	TBD in 2028	TBD in 2028	TBD in 2028	TBD in 2028	TBD in 2028
TBD in 2028	TBD in 2028	TBD in 2028	TBD in 2028	TBD in 2028	TBD in 2028	TBD in 2028	TBD in 2028	TBD in 2028	TBD in 2028
R_{21} Neb. Undeclared	R_{22} N.D. Undeclared	R_{23} Penn. Undeclared	R_{24} Texas; Undeclared	R_{25} Wyoming; Undeclared	R_{26} W.V. Undeclared	R_{27} Utah; Undeclared	R_{28} Ohio; Running	TBD in 2028	TBD in 2028
R_{20} Florida; Undeclared	R_{19} Indiana; Undeclared	R_{18} Miss. Undeclared	R_{17} Missouri; Undeclared	R_{16} Montana; Undeclared	R_{15}	R_{14}	R_{13}	R_{12}	R_{11}
R_{1}	R_{2}	R_{3}	R_{4}	R_{5}	R_{6}	R_{7}	R_{8}	R_{9}	R_{10}

=== After the elections ===
D_{1}	D_{2}	D_{3}	D_{4}	D_{5}	D_{6}	D_{7}	D_{8}	D_{9}	D_{10}
TBD in 2028	TBD in 2028	D_{18}	D_{17}	D_{16}	D_{15}	D_{14}	D_{13}	D_{12}	D_{11}
TBD in 2028	TBD in 2028	TBD in 2028	TBD in 2028	TBD in 2028	TBD in 2028	TBD in 2028	TBD in 2028	TBD in 2028	TBD in 2028
Ind. TBD	Hawaii; TBD	Fla. TBD	Del. TBD	Conn. TBD	Calif. TBD	Ariz. TBD	TBD in 2028	TBD in 2028	TBD in 2028
Maine; TBD	Md. TBD	Mass. TBD	Mich. TBD	Minn. TBD	Miss. TBD	Mo. TBD	Mont. TBD	Neb. TBD	Nev. TBD
Majority TBD →									Nev. TBD
Utah; TBD	Texas; TBD	Tenn. TBD	R.I. TBD	Pa. TBD	Ohio; TBD	N.D. TBD	N.Y. TBD	N.M. TBD	N.J. TBD
Vt. TBD	Va. TBD	Wash. TBD	W.Va. TBD	Wis. TBD	Wyo. TBD	TBD in 2028	TBD in 2028	TBD in 2028	TBD in 2028
TBD in 2028	TBD in 2028	TBD in 2028	TBD in 2028	TBD in 2028	TBD in 2028	TBD in 2028	TBD in 2028	TBD in 2028	TBD in 2028
TBD in 2028	TBD in 2028	TBD in 2028	TBD in 2028	TBD in 2028	R_{15}	R_{14}	R_{13}	R_{12}	R_{11}
R_{1}	R_{2}	R_{3}	R_{4}	R_{5}	R_{6}	R_{7}	R_{8}	R_{9}	R_{10}

Key

D_{#}	Democratic
R_{#}	Republican
I_{#}	Independent, caucusing with Democrats

== Race summary ==
=== Elections leading to the next Congress ===
In these general elections, the winners will be elected for the term beginning January 3, 2031.

State (linked to summaries below)	Incumbent				Results	Candidates
State (linked to summaries below)	Senator	Party	Electoral history	Last race	Results	Candidates
Arizona	Ruben Gallego	Democratic	2024	50.1% D	Incumbent's intent unknown	TBD
California	Adam Schiff	Democratic	2024 (special); 2024	58.9% D 58.8% D (special)	Incumbent's intent unknown	TBD
Connecticut	Chris Murphy	Democratic	2012; 2018; 2024	58.6% D	Incumbent's intent unknown	TBD
Delaware	Lisa Blunt Rochester	Democratic	2024	56.6% D	Incumbent's intent unknown	TBD
Florida	Rick Scott	Republican	2018; 2024	55.6% R	Incumbent's intent unknown	TBD
Hawaii	Mazie Hirono	Democratic	2012; 2018; 2024	64.6% D	Incumbent's intent unknown	TBD
Indiana	Jim Banks	Republican	2024	58.6% R	Incumbent's intent unknown	TBD
Maine	Angus King	Independent	2012; 2018; 2024	52.1% I	Incumbent's intent unknown	TBD
Maryland	Angela Alsobrooks	Democratic	2024	54.6% D	Incumbent's intent unknown	TBD
Massachusetts	Elizabeth Warren	Democratic	2012; 2018; 2024	59.8% D	Incumbent's intent unknown	TBD
Michigan	Elissa Slotkin	Democratic	2024	48.6% D	Incumbent's intent unknown	TBD
Minnesota	To be determined	DFL	2027 (special)	TBC	Incumbent to be determined	TBD
Mississippi	Roger Wicker	Republican	2007 (appointed); 2008 (special); 2012; 2018; 2024	62.8% R	Incumbent's intent unknown	TBD
Missouri	Josh Hawley	Republican	2018; 2024	55.6% R	Incumbent's intent unknown	TBD
Montana	Tim Sheehy	Republican	2024	52.6% R	Incumbent's intent unknown	TBD
Nebraska	Deb Fischer	Republican	2012; 2018; 2024	53.2% R	Incumbent's intent unknown	TBD
Nevada	Jacky Rosen	Democratic	2018; 2024	47.9% D	Incumbent's intent unknown	TBD
New Jersey	Andy Kim	Democratic	2024	53.6% D	Incumbent's intent unknown	TBD
New Mexico	Martin Heinrich	Democratic	2012; 2018; 2024	55.1% D	Incumbent's intent unknown	TBD
New York	Kirsten Gillibrand	Democratic	2009 (appointed); 2010 (special); 2012; 2018; 2024	58.9% D	Incumbent's intent unknown	TBD
North Dakota	Kevin Cramer	Republican	2018; 2024	66.3% R	Incumbent's intent unknown	TBD
Ohio	Bernie Moreno	Republican	2024	50.1% R	Incumbent running	▌Bernie Moreno (Republican)
Pennsylvania	David McCormick	Republican	2024	48.8% R	Incumbent's intent unknown	TBD
Rhode Island	Sheldon Whitehouse	Democratic	2006; 2012; 2018; 2024	59.9% D	Incumbent's intent unknown	TBD
Tennessee	To be determined	TBD	2028 (special)	TBC	Incumbent to be determined	TBD
Texas	Ted Cruz	Republican	2012; 2018; 2024	53.1% R	Incumbent's intent unknown	TBD
Utah	John Curtis	Republican	2024	62.5% R	Incumbent's intent unknown	TBD
Vermont	Bernie Sanders	Independent	2006; 2012; 2018; 2024	63.2% I	Incumbent's intent unknown	TBD
Virginia	Tim Kaine	Democratic	2012; 2018; 2024	54.4% D	Incumbent's intent unknown	TBD
Washington	Maria Cantwell	Democratic	2000; 2006; 2012; 2018; 2024	59.1% D	Incumbent's intent unknown	TBD
West Virginia	Jim Justice	Republican	2024	68.8% R	Incumbent's intent unknown	TBD
Wisconsin	Tammy Baldwin	Democratic	2012; 2018; 2024	49.3% D	Incumbent's intent unknown	TBD
Wyoming	John Barrasso	Republican	2007 (appointed); 2008 (special); 2012; 2018; 2024	75.1% R	Incumbent's intent unknown	TBD

== Arizona ==
One-term Democrat Ruben Gallego was elected in 2024 with 50.06% of the vote.

== California ==
One-term Democrat Adam Schiff was elected in 2024 with 58.9% of the vote (58.8% of the vote for the special election), both to complete the unexpired term of Democrat Dianne Feinstein and to the next full term.

== Connecticut ==
Three-term Democrat Chris Murphy was re-elected in 2024 with 58.6% of the vote.

== Delaware ==
One-term Democrat Lisa Blunt Rochester was elected in 2024 with 56.6% of the vote.

== Florida ==
Two-term Republican Rick Scott was re-elected in 2024 with 55.6% of the vote.

== Hawaii ==
Three-term Democrat Mazie Hirono was re-elected in 2024 with 64.6% of the vote.

== Indiana ==
One-term Republican Jim Banks was elected in 2024 with 58.6% of the vote.

== Maine ==
Three-term Independent Angus King was re-elected in 2024 with 52.06% of the vote.

== Maryland ==
One-term Democrat Angela Alsobrooks was elected in 2024 with 54.6% of the vote.

== Massachusetts ==
Three-term Democrat Elizabeth Warren was re-elected in 2024 with 59.8% of the vote.

== Michigan ==
One-term Democrat Elissa Slotkin was elected in 2024 with 48.6% of the vote.

== Minnesota ==
Four-term Democrat Amy Klobuchar was re-elected in 2024 with 56.2% of the vote. She successfully ran for governor in 2026 and will resign from the Senate sometime in 2027. Either outgoing governor Tim Walz or Klobuchar will appoint an interim replacement, depending on when Klobuchar resigns from the Senate. The appointee will serve until a special election takes place in November 2027.

== Mississippi ==
Three-term Republican Roger Wicker was re-elected in 2024 with 62.8% of the vote.

== Missouri ==
Two-term Republican Josh Hawley was re-elected in 2024 with 55.6% of the vote.

== Montana ==
One-term Republican Tim Sheehy was elected in 2024 with 52.6% of the vote.

== Nebraska ==
Three-term Republican Deb Fischer was re-elected in 2024 with 53.2% of the vote.

== Nevada ==
Two-term Democrat Jacky Rosen was re-elected in 2024 with 47.9% of the vote.

== New Jersey ==
One-term Democrat Andy Kim was elected in 2024 with 53.6% of the vote.

== New Mexico ==
Three-term Democrat Martin Heinrich was re-elected in 2024 with 55.1% of the vote.

== New York ==
Three-term Democrat Kirsten Gillibrand was re-elected in 2024 with 58.9% of the vote.

== North Dakota ==
Two-term Republican Kevin Cramer was re-elected in 2024 with 66.3% of the vote.

== Ohio ==
One-term Republican Bernie Moreno was elected in 2024 with 50.1% of the vote. In August 2026, Moreno stated that he intends to seek a second term.

== Pennsylvania ==
One-term Republican Dave McCormick was elected in 2024 with 48.8% of the vote.

Former U.S. Senator Bob Casey Jr., whom McCormick unseated in the 2024 Senate election, was seen as a potential contender for the Democratic nomination for the 2028 race, but Casey has since declined to run. He has not specifically commented with regard to a potential 2024 rematch in 2030. Current Democratic U.S. Senator John Fetterman (elected in 2022) has declined to campaign against McCormick.

== Rhode Island ==
Four-term Democrat Sheldon Whitehouse was re-elected in 2024 with 59.9% of the vote.

== Tennessee ==
Two-term Republican Marsha Blackburn was re-elected in 2024 with 63.8% of the vote. She successfully ran for governor in 2026 and will resign from the Senate sometime in 2027. U.S. House members Chuck Fleischmann and Tim Burchett are considered possible appointees to be chosen by outgoing governor Bill Lee in December 2026. However, Blackburn said she planned to appoint her own successor to the Senate. In either case, there will be a special election for the final two years of Blackburn's term.

== Texas ==
Three-term Republican Ted Cruz was re-elected in 2024 with 53.1% of the vote.

== Utah ==
One-term Republican John Curtis was elected in 2024 with 62.5% of the vote.

Curtis has expressed interest in a possible campaign for Governor of Utah in 2028.

== Vermont ==
Four-term Independent Bernie Sanders was re-elected in 2024 with 63.2% of the vote. Sanders will be 89 at the time of the election and has continued to face calls to retire. He has said his fourth term will likely be his last. U.S. Representative Becca Balint has expressed interest in running if Sanders retires. No Democrat has ever won the Class 1 Senate seat from Vermont. (Note: Sanders is officially an Independent, but counts as a Democrat because he caucuses with the party.)

== Virginia ==
Three-term Democrat Tim Kaine was re-elected in 2024 with 54.4% of the vote.

== Washington ==
Five-term Democrat Maria Cantwell was re-elected in 2024 with 59.1% of the vote.

== West Virginia ==
One-term Republican Jim Justice was elected in 2024 with 68.8% of the vote.

Justice has expressed interest in a possible campaign for Governor of West Virginia in 2028.

== Wisconsin ==
Three-term Democrat Tammy Baldwin was re-elected in 2024 with 49.3% of the vote.

== Wyoming ==
Three-term Republican and Senate Republican Whip John Barrasso was re-elected in 2024 with 75.1% of the vote.
