= Scott Morrow =

Scott Morrow may refer to:

- Scott Morrow (ice hockey, born 1969), American ice hockey player
- Scott Morrow (ice hockey, born 2002), American ice hockey player, nephew of the above
- Scott Morrow, American politician, Democratic nominee in the 2024 United States Senate election in Wyoming
