= Physicians in the United States Congress =

Physicians in the United States Congress have been a small minority of the members of Congress, with fluctuating numbers over the years. The number of physicians serving and running for Congress has risen over the last 50 years from 5 in 1960, down to a low of 2 in 1990, to a maximum of 21 in 2013 and a decrease to 14 in 2017. Possible explanations for this development have been increasing health care spending and increased health care reform debate in the United States, leading up to the Healthcare Reform Act.

In public opinion research by the American Medical Association (AMA) from 2013, voters rated "understanding of the problems facing our healthcare industry, including the bureaucratic red tape that is strangling health care providers and driving up the cost of health care for most Americans" as the most convincing statement of a physician candidate for Congress. Physicians in Congress have received large campaign contributions from health care trade associations and from peers through physician associations such as the AMA.

== History ==
In 1776, 11 percent of the signers of the Declaration of Independence were physicians. Likewise, two (5 percent) of the 39 individuals crafting the US Constitution in 1787 were physicians.

During the first 100 years of Congress (1789–1889), 252 (or 4.6 percent) of 5405 members were physicians.

=== 20th and 21st century ===
The number of physicians serving and running for Congress has risen over the last 50 years from 5 in 1960, down to 3 in 1970 and a low of 2 in 1990 up to 10 (in 2000) to a maximum of 21, including one female physician, in 2013, as of 2015, there were 18, and as of 2017 a small decrease to 15 physicians.

Possible explanations for the increase since the 1990s have been increasing health care spending and increased health care reform debate in the United States, leading up to the Healthcare Reform Act.

== Motivations ==
Tom Coburn said, "physicians have watched the profession undergo tremendous realignments that are shifting doctors' responsibilities away from patient care, changes they attribute to the government's inefficacy". Jim McDermott was quoted as saying "They want to have their hands right there on the handle so they can pull it one way or another." Physicians "balked at the idea of lawmakers with no medical experience making decisions that could upend the profession", per Andy Harris.

Kelley Paul, wife of Rand Paul, said in 2015 when he made his 2016 White House bid, "Being a physician gives Rand a unique perspective in Washington, simply because he's trained to diagnose a problem and find a solution."

=== Party membership ===
In 2013, three quarters of physicians in Congress were Republican, and 80% as of 2017. As a possible reason Jim McDermott offered, "politically conservative physicians were more likely to chafe at the direction of changes in health care, with greater oversight by the government and a more regulated role for the private sector. It's a fundamental debate about what is in the public good."

During the 2016 cycle the AMA political action committee spent $2 million with "direct contributions to 348 physician-friendly [Congressional] candidates (58% Republican and 46% Democratic)".

=== Gender, geography and medical specialty ===
Of the 27 physicians in Congress since 2005, 93% have been men, which is in stark contrast to 70% male physicians in general. 63% were from the South (vs 35% of all Congressional members) and 26% were surgeons (vs 11% of all US physicians).

=== Political participation ===
According to a 2024 study using data of the US Census Bureau’s Current Population Survey being a physician was not associated with political participation and was actually negatively associated with attending public meetings. That said, this study uses Current Population Survey data, which uses self-reported voting that is rife with social desirability bias. A recent study using national voter file data finds that physicians were more likely than non-physicians to vote in the 2020 presidential election.

== Public opinion ==
In 2013, the AMA funded three focus groups of voters across the country and an online survey to research public opinion on physicians as Congressional candidates. The top scoring potential message for a physician was to link back to health care expertise. "Because physicians work in health care daily, they bring a clear understanding of the problems facing our healthcare industry, including the bureaucratic red tape that is strangling health care providers and driving up the cost of health care for most Americans."

=== Candidates, 2014 ===
Senate candidates in 2014 included "an obstetrician in North Carolina, Milton R. Wolf, a radiologist in Kansas, a liver disease specialist in Louisiana, and Representatives Paul Broun and Phil Gingrey in Georgia, all of them Republicans. At least 26 more physicians were running for the House, some for re-election," per a New York Times article from March 2014.

== 113th Congress (2013–2015) ==
From 2013 to 2015 there were 20 physicians in U.S.Congress, 19 of whom were male and 16 of whom were members of the Republican party.

Legislature	Name	Party-state-district	Year elected	Medical specialty	2012 campaign money raised
Senate	John Barrasso	(R-WY)	2008 (Note: The governor of Wyoming appointed Barrasso to his Senate seat following the death in office of Craig L. Thomas in 2007. Barrasso was subsequently elected to fill the remainder of Senator Thomas's term.)	Orthopedic surgery	$8,081,603
House	Dan Benishek	(R-MI-01)	2010	General surgery, retired	$2,255,260
House	Ami Bera	(D-CA-07)	2012	Internal medicine	$1,373,106
House	Charles Boustany	(R-LA-03)	2004	Cardiothoracic surgery, retired	$4,879,644
House	Paul Broun	(R-GA-10)	2007	Family medicine	$1,410,625
House	Larry Bucshon	(R-IN-08)	2010	Thoracic surgery	$608,721
House	Michael C. Burgess	(R-TX-26)	2010	OB/GYN	$613,280
House	Bill Cassidy	(R-LA)	2008	Gastroenterology	$5,121,030
House	Donna Christensen	(D-Virgin Islands-AL)	1996	Emergency medicine	$330,274
Senate	Tom Coburn	(R-OK)	2004	Family medicine	$2,100,328 †
House	Scott DesJarlais	(R-TN-04)	2010	General practice	$283,549
House	John Fleming	(R-LA-04)	2008	Family medicine	$698,596
House	Phil Gingrey	(R-GA-11)	2002	OB/GYN	$1,530,373
House	Andrew P. Harris	(R-MD-01)	2010	Anesthesiology	$1,689,833
House	Joe Heck	(R-NV-03)	2010	Emergency medicine	$1,117,768
House	Jim McDermott	(D-WA-07)	1988	Psychiatry	$223,469
Senate	Rand Paul	(R-KY)	2010	Ophthalmology	$9,942,744†
House	Tom Price	(R-GA-06)	2004	Orthopedic surgery	$1,375,428
House	David "Phil" Roe	(R-TN-01)	2008	OB/GYN	$348,673
House	Raul Ruiz	(D-CA-36)	2012	Emergency medicine	$1,504,150

† 2009/2012 cycle ††2013–2014 cycle

== 114th Congress (2015–2017) ==
From 2015 to 2017, there were 17 physicians in U.S. Congress. All were male and 14 were members of the Republican party.

Legislature	Name	Party-state-district	Year elected	Medical specialty	2014 campaign money raised
House	Ralph Abraham	(R-LA-05)	2014	Family medicine, veterinarian	$824,819
Senate	John Barrasso	(R-WY)	2008	Orthopedic surgery	$7,045,286
House	Dan Benishek	(R-MI-01)	2010	General surgery, retired	$2,152,648
House	Ami Bera	(D-CA-07)	2012	Internal medicine	$4,410,225
House	Charles Boustany	(R-LA-03)	2004	Cardiothoracic surgery, retired	$2,711,231
House	Larry Bucshon	(R-IN-08)	2010	Thoracic surgery	$608,721
House	Michael C. Burgess	(R-TX-26)	2010	OB/GYN	$613,280
Senate	Bill Cassidy	(R-LA)	2014	Gastroenterology	$15,548,343
House	Scott DesJarlais	(R-TN-04)	2010	General practice	$283,549
House	John Fleming	(R-LA-04)	2008	Family medicine	$698,596
House	Andrew P. Harris	(R-MD-01)	2010	Anesthesiology	$1,422,625
House	Joe Heck	(R-NV-03)	2010	Emergency medicine	$1,117,768
House	Jim McDermott	(D-WA-07)	1988	Psychiatry	$223,469
Senate	Rand Paul	(R-KY)	2010	Ophthalmology	$19,613,645
House	Tom Price	(R-GA-06)	2004	Orthopedic surgery	$2,784,268
House	David "Phil" Roe	(R-TN-01)	2008	OB/GYN	$933,431
House	Raul Ruiz	(D-CA-36)	2012	Emergency medicine	$3,439,977

† 2009/2014 cycle

== 115th Congress (2017–2019) ==
From 2017 to 2019 there were 16 physicians in the U.S. Congress; all were male and 14 were members of the Republican party. There were also one podiatrist, one dentist, and one optometrist.

Legislature	Name	Party-state-district	Year elected	Medical specialty	2016 campaign money raised
House	Ralph Abraham	(R-LA-05)	2014	Family medicine, veterinarian	$577,493
Senate	John Barrasso	(R-WY)	2008	Orthopedic surgery	$6,677,705
House	Ami Bera	(D-CA-07)	2012	General practice	$4,128,996
House	Larry Bucshon	(R-IN-08)	2010	Thoracic surgery	$1,045,223
House	Michael C. Burgess	(R-TX-26)	2002	OB/GYN	$1,857,590
Senate	Bill Cassidy	(R-LA)	2014	Gastroenterology	$17,269,420
House	Scott DesJarlais	(R-TN-04)	2010	General practice	$637,783
House	Neal Dunn	(R-FL-02)	2016	Urology	$1,968,334
House	Andrew P. Harris	(R-MD-01)	2010	Anesthesiology	$1,402,664
House	Roger Marshall	(R-KS-01)	2016	Obstetrician	$1,506,821
Senate	Rand Paul	(R-KY)	2010	Ophthalmology	$12,105,270
House	Tom Price	(R-GA-06)	2004	Orthopedic surgery	$2,769,758
House	David "Phil" Roe	(R-TN-01)	2008	OB/GYN	$952,677
House	Raul Ruiz	(D-CA-36)	2012	Emergency medicine	$3,225,291

== 116th Congress (2019–2021) ==
From 2019 to 2021 there were 17 physicians in the U.S. Congress; all but one were male and 14 were members of the Republican party.

Legislature	Name	Party-state-district	Year elected	Medical specialty
House	Ralph Abraham	(R-LA-05)	2014	Family medicine, veterinarian
Senate	John Barrasso	(R-WY)	2008	Orthopedic surgery
House	Ami Bera	(D-CA-07)	2012	Internal medicine
House	Larry Bucshon	(R-IN-08)	2010	Thoracic surgery
House	Michael C. Burgess	(R-TX-26)	2002	OB/GYN
Senate	Bill Cassidy	(R-LA)	2014	Gastroenterology
House	Scott DesJarlais	(R-TN-04)	2010	Family medicine
House	Neal Dunn	(R-FL-02)	2016	Urology
House	Mark Green	(R-TN-07)	2018	Emergency medicine
House	Andrew P. Harris	(R-MD-01)	2010	Anesthesiology
House	John Joyce	(R-PA-09)	2018	Dermatology
House	Roger Marshall	(R-KS-01)	2016	OB/GYN
House	Greg Murphy	(R-NC-03)	2019	Urology
Senate	Rand Paul	(R-KY)	2010	Ophthalmology
House	David "Phil" Roe	(R-TN-01)	2008	OB/GYN
House	Raul Ruiz	(D-CA-36)	2012	Emergency medicine
House	Kim Schrier	(D-WA-08)	2018	Pediatrics

== 117th Congress (2021–2023) ==
There were 17 physicians in the 117th Congress, of whom 13 served in the House and 4 served in the Senate.

Legislature	Name	Party-state-district	Year elected	Medical specialty
Senate	John Barrasso	(R-WY)	2008	Orthopedic surgery
House	Ami Bera	(D-CA-07)	2012 (Note: Prior to redistricting after the 2020 US Census, which took effect in the 118th Congress, Bera represented CA-07.)	Internal medicine
House	Larry Bucshon	(R-IN-08)	2010	Thoracic surgery
House	Michael C. Burgess	(R-TX-26)	2002	Obstetrics and gynecology
Senate	Bill Cassidy	(R-LA)	2014	Gastroenterology
House	Scott DesJarlais	(R-TN-04)	2010	Family medicine
House	Neal Dunn	(R-FL-02)	2016	Urology
House	Mark Green	(R-TN-07)	2018	Emergency medicine
House	Andy Harris	(R-MD-01)	2010	Anesthesiology
House	Ronny Jackson	(R-TX-13)	2020	Emergency medicine
House	John Joyce	(R-PA-13)	2018	Dermatology
Senate	Roger Marshall	(R-KS)	2020	Obstetrics and gynecology
House	Mariannette Miller-Meeks	(R-IA-02)	2020	Ophthalmology
House	Greg Murphy	(R-NC-03)	2019	Urology
Senate	Rand Paul	(R-KY)	2010	Ophthalmology
House	Raul Ruiz	(D-CA-36)	2012	Emergency medicine
House	Kim Schrier	(D-WA-08)	2018	Pediatrics

== 118th Congress (2023–2025) ==
There were 19 physicians in the 118th Congress, of whom 15 served in the House and 4 served in the Senate. Three were women.

Legislature	Name	Party-state-district	Year elected	Medical specialty
Senate	John Barrasso	(R-WY)	2008	Orthopedic surgery
House	Ami Bera	(D-CA-06)	2012	Internal medicine
House	Larry Bucshon	(R-IN-08)	2010	Thoracic surgery
House	Michael Burgess	(R-TX-26)	2002	Obstetrics and gynecology
House	Yadira Caraveo	(D-CO-08)	2022	Pediatrics
Senate	Bill Cassidy	(R-LA)	2014	Gastroenterology
House	Scott DesJarlais	(R-TN-04)	2010	Family medicine
House	Neal Dunn	(R-FL-02)	2016	Urology
House	Mark Green	(R-TN-07)	2018	Emergency medicine
House	Andy Harris	(R-MD-01)	2010	Anesthesiology
House	Ronny Jackson	(R-TX-13)	2020	Emergency medicine
House	John Joyce	(R-PA-13)	2018	Dermatology
Senate	Roger Marshall	(R-KS)	2020	Obstetrics and gynecology
House	Rich McCormick	(R-GA-06)	2022	Emergency medicine
House	Mariannette Miller-Meeks	(R-IA-01)	2020	Ophthalmology
House	Greg Murphy	(R-NC-03)	2019	Urology
Senate	Rand Paul	(R-KY)	2010	Ophthalmology
House	Raul Ruiz	(D-CA-35)	2012	Emergency medicine
House	Mike Simpson	(R-ID-02)	1999	Dentistry
House	Kim Schrier	(D-WA-08)	2018	Pediatrics

== 119th Congress (2025–present) ==
There are 21 physicians in the 119th Congress, of whom 17 are serving in the House and four in the Senate.

Legislature	Name	Party-state-district	Year elected	Medical specialty
Senate	John Barrasso	(R-WY)	2008	Orthopedic surgery
House	Ami Bera	(D-CA-06)	2012	Internal medicine
Senate	John Boozman	(R-AR)	2010	Optometry
Senate	Bill Cassidy	(R-LA)	2014	Gastroenterology
House	Herb Conoway	(D-NJ-03)	2024	Internal medicine
House	Scott DesJarlais	(R-TN-04)	2010	Family medicine
House	Maxine Dexter	(D-OR-03)	2024	Pulmonary and critical care
House	Neal Dunn	(R-FL-02)	2016	Urology
House	Mark Green	(R-TN-07)	2018	Emergency medicine
House	Andy Harris	(R-MD-01)	2010	Anesthesiology
House	Ronny Jackson	(R-TX-13)	2020	Emergency medicine
House	John Joyce	(R-PA-13)	2018	Dermatology
House	Mike Kennedy	(R-UT-03)	2024	Family medicine
Senate	Roger Marshall	(R-KS)	2020	Obstetrics and gynecology
House	Rich McCormick	(R-GA-06)	2022	Emergency medicine
House	Mariannette Miller-Meeks	(R-IA-01)	2020	Ophthalmology
House	Kelly Morrison	(D-MN-03)	2024	Obstetrics and gynecology
House	Greg Murphy	(R-NC-03)	2019	Urology
House	Bob Onder	(R-MO-03)	2024	Allergy
Senate	Rand Paul	(R-KY)	2010	Ophthalmology
House	Raul Ruiz	(D-CA-35)	2012	Emergency medicine
House	Kim Schrier	(D-WA-08)	2018	Pediatrics
