= Trauma Systems and Regionalization of Emergency Care Reauthorization Act =

Amendment to the Public Health Service Act

- Long title: To amend title XII of the Public Health Service Act to reauthorize certain trauma care programs, and for other purposes.
- Announced in: the 113th United States Congress
- Sponsored by: Rep. Michael C. Burgess (R, TX-26)
- Number of co-sponsors: 1

Codification
- U.S.C. sections affected: 42 U.S.C. § 300d–32, 42 U.S.C. § 300d–13, 42 U.S.C. § 300d–31
- Authorizations of appropriations: $24 million a year for each of fiscal years 2015 through 2019, for a total of $120,000,000 over five years

Legislative history
- Introduced in the House as H.R. 4080 by Rep. Michael C. Burgess (R, TX-26) on February 25, 2014; Committee consideration by United States House Committee on Energy and Commerce, United States House Energy Subcommittee on Health; Passed the House on June 24, 2014 (voice vote)

The Trauma Systems and Regionalization of Emergency Care Reauthorization Act (H.R. 4080) is a bill that would amend the Public Health Service Act to authorize funding for public and private entities that provide trauma and emergency care services and for the administration of the Federal Interagency Committee on Emergency Medical Services (FICEMS).

The bill was introduced into the United States House of Representatives during the 113th United States Congress.

== Background ==
Four trauma programs authorized by the Affordable Care Act are reauthorized by this legislation. The leading cause of death for people are 1-44 is traumatic injury.

== Provisions of the bill ==
This summary is based largely on the summary provided by the Congressional Research Service, a public domain source.

The Trauma Systems and Regionalization of Emergency Care Reauthorization Act would amend the Public Health Service Act to authorize appropriations for trauma care programs through FY2019. The bill would require that not more than 50% of amounts remaining for a fiscal year after FY2014 (after allocation for administrative purposes or for improvement of emergency medical services in rural areas) be allocated for competitive grants to support pilot projects for emergency care and trauma systems.

The bill would require the inclusion of standards and requirements of the American Burn Association in trauma care modifications of a state plan for providing emergency medical services.

== Congressional Budget Office report ==
This summary is based largely on the summary provided by the Congressional Budget Office, as ordered reported by the House Committee on Energy and Commerce on April 3, 2014. This is a public domain source.

H.R. 4080 would amend the Public Health Service Act to authorize funding for public and private entities that provide trauma and emergency care services and for the administration of the Federal Interagency Committee on Emergency Medical Services (FICEMS).

The bill would authorize the appropriation of $24 million a year for each of fiscal years 2015 through 2019. The Congressional Budget Office (CBO) estimates that implementing the bill would cost $101 million over the 2015-2019 period, assuming appropriation of the authorized amounts. Pay-as-you-go procedures do not apply to this legislation because it would not affect direct spending or revenues.

The bill contains no intergovernmental or private-sector mandates as defined in the Unfunded Mandates Reform Act.

== Procedural history ==
The Trauma Systems and Regionalization of Emergency Care Reauthorization Act was introduced into the United States House of Representatives on February 25, 2014 by Rep. Michael C. Burgess (R, TX-26). The bill was referred to the United States House Committee on Energy and Commerce and the United States House Energy Subcommittee on Health. The bill was reported (amended) on May 20, 2014 alongside House Report 113-459. The House voted on June 24, 2014 to pass the bill in a voice vote.

== Debate and discussion ==
The Trauma Center Association of America (TCAA) supported the bill, calling it "vital legislation." According to the TCAA, the bill would "reauthorize two important grant mechanisms, the Trauma Care Systems Planning Grants and the Regionalization of Emergency Care Systems. The first supports state and rural development of trauma systems and the second funds pilot projects to design, implement, and evaluate innovative models of regionalized emergency care."

The Emergency Nurses Association (ENA) supported the bill, lobbying in its favor during a week-long lobbying visit to Capitol hill May 6-12. The ENA lobbied for "$28 million in funding for these critical trauma and emergency medical service programs" to help "develop comprehensive trauma systems and prevent further trauma center closures." According to the Trauma Center Association of America, there were at least 21 trauma centers that closed over the last decade and only eight states have what they would consider to be "fully developed trauma systems."

The Society of Trauma Nurses (STN) also advocated in favor of the bill, encouraging its members to persuade their representatives to co-sponsor the bill.

== See also ==
- List of bills in the 113th United States Congress
- Emergency medical services in the United States
