= 2024 United States Senate election in Wyoming =

- November 5, 2024
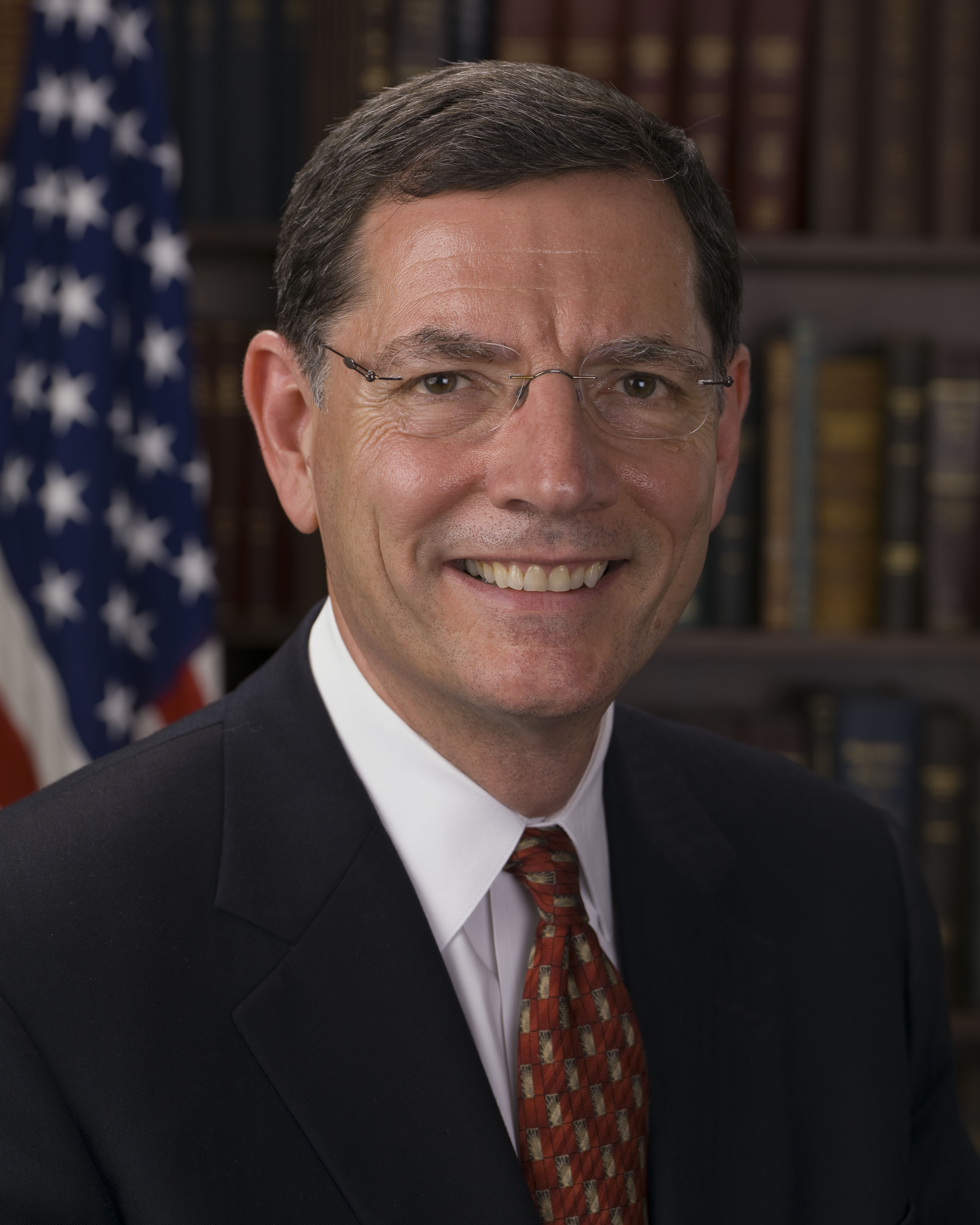

Nominee	John Barrasso	Scott Morrow
Party	Republican	Democratic
Popular vote	198,418	63,727
Percentage	75.11%	24.12%
- County results Barrasso: 50–60% 60–70% 70–80% 80–90% Morrow: 60–70%
U.S. senator before election
John Barrasso
Republican
Elected U.S. senator
John Barrasso
Republican

The 2024 United States Senate election in Wyoming was held on November 5, 2024, to elect a member of the United States Senate to represent the state of Wyoming. Incumbent Senator John Barrasso was appointed to the Senate in 2007 after Craig Thomas died. Barrasso won a 2008 special election to complete Thomas' term and won full terms in 2012 and 2018. He was seeking a third full term and declared his intent to run for Assistant Republican Leader at the end of the year. Primary elections took place on August 20, 2024. Wyoming has been represented in the U.S. Senate exclusively by Republicans since 1977, and Barrasso was heavily favored to win another term.

Having won renomination with more than 67% of the vote, Barrasso was easily re-elected with over 75% of the vote in the general election, defeating Democrat Scott Morrow, carrying every county except Teton, and flipping Albany. Barrasso overperformed Republican Donald Trump in the concurrent presidential election by 4.51%. This was the largest margin of victory in any U.S. Senate election since North Dakota in 2016, and it represented a significant improvement from Barrasso's 2018 performance, which was the weakest in his Senate career and the closest at the time where a Democrat ever came to winning a Senate seat in the state since 1996.

== Republican primary ==
=== Candidates ===
==== Nominee ====
- John Barrasso, incumbent U.S. senator (2007–present)

==== Eliminated in primary ====
- John Holtz, retired circuit court judge and candidate for U.S. Senate in 2018 and 2020
- Reid Rasner, financial executive

=== Endorsements ===
John Barrasso

Executive branch officials

- Donald Trump, former president of the United States (2017–2021) and 2024 presidential nominee

U.S. senators

- Cynthia Lummis, Wyoming (2021–present)

U.S. representatives

- Harriet Hageman, WY-AL (2023–present)

Organizations

- AIPAC
- ClearPath Action Fund

=== Fundraising ===
Campaign finance reports as of March 31, 2024
Candidate	Raised	Spent	Cash on hand
Reid Rasner (R)	$262,251	$180,915	$81,336
John Barrasso (R)	$7,171,125	$3,736,139	$7,392,759
Source: Federal Election Commission

=== Results ===
Primary results by county Barrasso: 60–70%; 70–80%

Republican primary results
Party	Candidate	Votes	%
Republican	John Barrasso (incumbent)	70,494	67.9%
Republican	Reid Rasner	25,427	24.5%
Republican	John Holtz	7,868	7.6%
Total votes		103,789	100.0%

== Democratic primary ==
=== Candidates ===
==== Nominee ====
- Scott Morrow, educator

=== Results ===
Democratic primary results
Party	Candidate	Votes	%
Democratic	Scott Morrow	10,088	100.0%
Total votes		10,088	100.0%

== General election ==
=== Predictions ===
Source	Ranking	As of
The Cook Political Report	Solid R	May 3, 2023
Inside Elections	Solid R	July 28, 2023
Sabato's Crystal Ball	Safe R	January 24, 2023
Decision Desk HQ/The Hill	Safe R	June 8, 2024
Elections Daily	Safe R	May 4, 2023
CNalysis	Solid R	November 21, 2023
RealClearPolitics	Solid R	August 5, 2024
Split Ticket	Safe R	October 23, 2024
538	Solid R	October 23, 2024

=== Polling ===
Poll source	Date(s) administered	Sample size (Note: Key: A – all adults RV – registered voters LV – likely voters V – unclear)	Margin of error	John Barrasso	Scott Morrow	Undecided
Cygnal (R)	October 26–28, 2024	600 (LV)	± 4.0%	73%	26%	1%

=== Debate ===
2024 United States Senate election in Wyoming debate
No.	Date	Host	Moderator	Link	Republican	Democratic
Key: P Participant A Absent N Not invited I Invited W Withdrawn						
Key: P Participant A Absent N Not invited I Invited W Withdrawn					John Barrasso	Scott Morrow
1	Oct. 17, 2024	Central Wyoming College; Wyoming PBS	Steve Peck	YouTube	P	P

=== Results ===
2024 United States Senate election in Wyoming
Party	Candidate	Votes	%	±%
Republican	John Barrasso (incumbent)	198,418	75.11%	+8.15%
Democratic	Scott Morrow	63,727	24.12%	−5.98%
Write-in		2,017	0.76%	+0.60%
Total votes		264,162	100.00%	N/A
Republican hold				

==== By county ====
County	John Barrasso Republican		Scott Morrow Democratic		Write-in Various		Margin		Total votes cast
County	#	%	#	%	#	%	#	%	Total votes cast
Albany	9,737	55.34%	7,745	44.02%	114	0.65%	1,992	11.32%	17,596
Big Horn	4,922	86.90%	703	12.41%	39	0.69%	4,219	74.49%	5,664
Campbell	15,774	88.68%	1,877	10.55%	137	0.77%	13,897	78.13%	17,788
Carbon	5,028	80.01%	1,216	19.35%	40	0.64%	3,812	60.66%	6,284
Converse	5,699	86.97%	802	12.24%	52	0.79%	4,897	74.73%	6,553
Crook	3,817	89.94%	393	9.26%	34	0.80%	3,424	80.68%	4,244
Fremont	11,930	70.72%	4,823	28.59%	117	0.69%	7,107	42.13%	16,870
Goshen	5,066	83.01%	1,011	16.57%	26	0.43%	4,055	66.44%	6,103
Hot Springs	2,140	82.66%	436	16.84%	13	0.50%	1,704	65.82%	2,589
Johnson	4,063	84.15%	727	15.06%	38	0.79%	3,336	69.10%	4,828
Laramie	29,648	68.77%	13,092	30.37%	371	0.86%	16,556	38.40%	43,111
Lincoln	9,077	85.46%	1,480	13.93%	64	0.60%	7,597	71.53%	10,621
Natrona	25,240	75.90%	7,674	23.08%	342	1.03%	17,566	52.82%	33,256
Niobrara	1,073	89.94%	118	9.89%	2	0.17%	955	80.05%	1,193
Park	13,343	81.92%	2,790	17.13%	154	0.95%	10,553	64.79%	16,287
Platte	3,924	83.42%	747	15.88%	33	0.70%	3,177	67.54%	4,704
Sheridan	12,580	77.88%	3,438	21.28%	136	0.84%	9,142	56.59%	16,154
Sublette	4,007	82.98%	779	16.13%	43	0.89%	3,228	66.85%	4,829
Sweetwater	12,724	77.82%	3,550	21.71%	77	0.47%	9,174	56.11%	16,351
Teton	5,083	38.92%	7,885	60.38%	91	0.70%	-2,802	-21.46%	13,059
Uinta	7,310	82.68%	1,478	16.72%	53	0.60%	5,832	65.97%	8,841
Washakie	3,207	83.93%	588	15.39%	26	0.68%	2,619	68.54%	3,821
Weston	3,026	88.58%	375	10.98%	15	0.44%	2,651	77.61%	3,416
Totals	198,418	75.11%	63,727	24.12%	2,017	0.76%	134,691	50.99%	264,162

==== Counties that flipped from Democratic to Republican ====
- Albany (largest municipality: Laramie)
