= Michael C. Burgess =

American politician (born 1950)

Mike Burgess
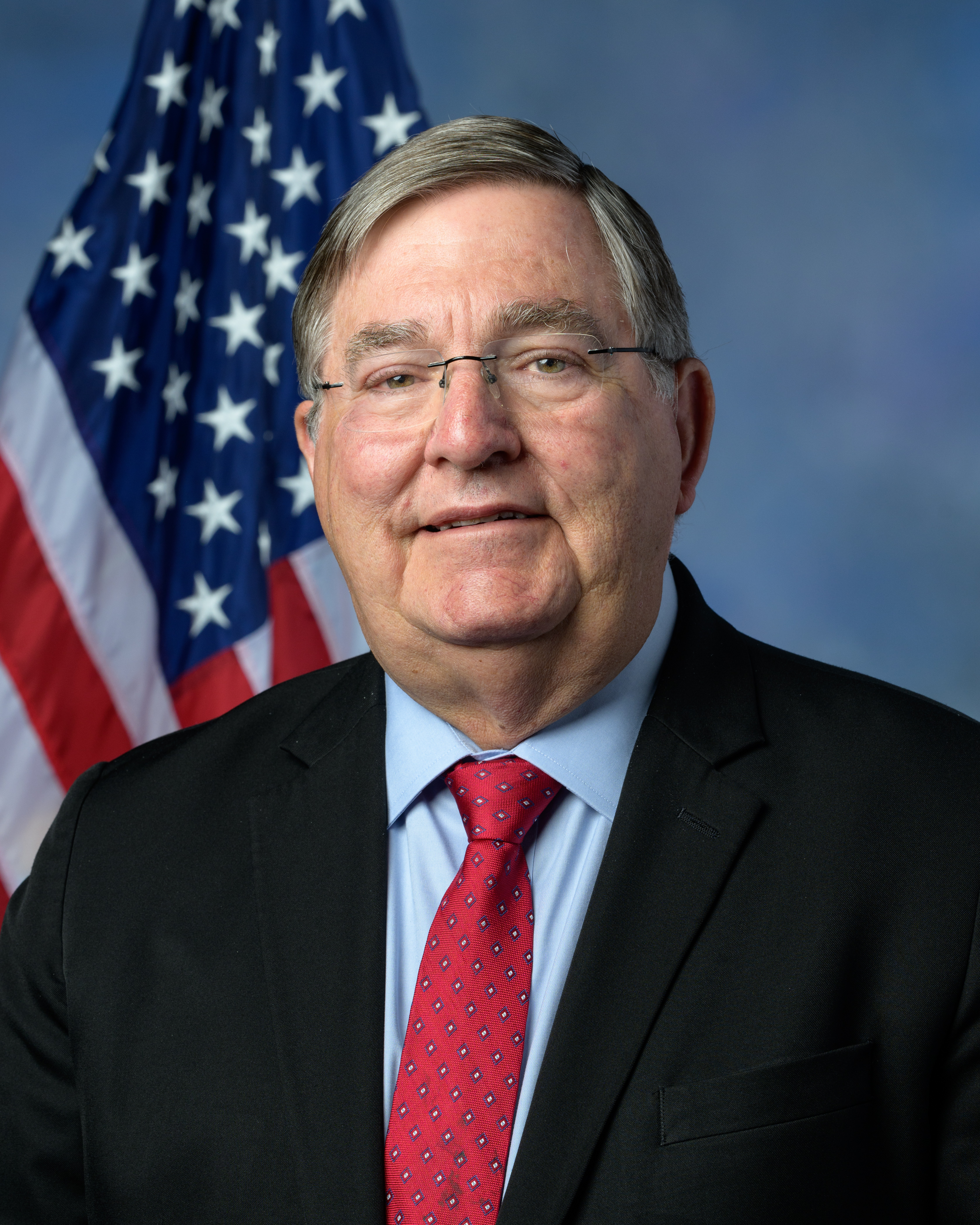
- Official portrait, 2023

Chair of the House Rules Committee
- In office April 10, 2024 – January 3, 2025
- Preceded by: Tom Cole
- Succeeded by: Virginia Foxx

Member of the U.S. House of Representatives from Texas's 26th district
- In office January 3, 2003 – January 3, 2025
- Preceded by: Dick Armey
- Succeeded by: Brandon Gill

Personal details
- Born: Michael Clifton Burgess; December 23, 1950 (age 75) Rochester, Minnesota, U.S.
- Party: Republican
- Spouse: Laura Burgess (m. 1976)
- Children: 3
- Education: University of North Texas (BS, MS); University of Texas, Houston (MD); University of Texas, Dallas (MS)
- Burgess's voice Burgess honoring former President George H. W. Bush. Recorded December 10, 2018

Michael Clifton Burgess (born December 23, 1950) is an American physician and politician who represented Texas's 26th congressional district in the United States House of Representatives from 2003 to 2025. The district is anchored in Denton County, a suburban county north of Dallas and Fort Worth. He is a member of the Republican Party.

Before his election, he practiced as a doctor of obstetrics and gynecology. In 2002, Burgess defeated Scott Armey, the son of House Majority Leader and then-U.S. Representative Dick Armey, in a primary runoff election. As a congressman, he was a member of the congressional Tea Party Caucus. Burgess has been involved in the debates over health care reform and energy policy. He opposes abortion, is unsure of the extent of the contribution of human activity to global warming, supported President Donald Trump's restrictions on travel from Muslim-majority countries and refugee immigration, and supports the repeal of the Affordable Care Act (Obamacare).

Burgess declined to seek a 12th term during the 2024 election cycle, and retired from Congress in 2025.

== Early life, education, and medical career ==
Michael Burgess was born in Rochester, Minnesota, the son of Norma (née Crowhurst) and Harry Meredith Burgess; his paternal family emigrated from Nova Scotia, Canada. He graduated from North Texas State University (now the University of North Texas) in 1972 and from McGovern Medical School at the University of Texas Health Science Center at Houston in 1977. He completed a residency in obstetrics and gynecology at Parkland Memorial Hospital in Dallas. Over the course of his career, Burgess delivered over 3,000 babies. He is an Episcopalian.

== U.S. House of Representatives ==
=== Elections ===
Burgess, who had never held any public office entered the 2002 Republican primary election to replace House Majority Leader Dick Armey. His opponent was Armey's son, Scott. The district, comprising almost all of Denton County (except a sliver in the southeast), was strongly Republican, and pundits predicted that whoever won the primary would not only win the general election, but be assured of at least a decade in Congress. Using the campaign slogan "My dad is NOT Dick Armey", Burgess touted the support of medical Political Action Committees and organizations like the National Beer Wholesalers Association. Burgess took second place in the primary, with 23% of the vote to Armey's 45%. Since neither candidate earned the required majority of votes, a runoff election ensued. Before the runoff, The Dallas Morning News released a series of articles alleging that Armey used his influence as a judge to procure county jobs and contracts for his friends. The report hurt Armey's campaign, and Burgess won the runoff with 55% of the vote. He won the general election with 75% of the vote.

Burgess's vote shares include:

- 66% in 2004
- 60% in 2006
- 60% in 2008
- 67% in 2010
- 68% in 2012
- nearly 84% in 2014 (for the first time, Burgess did not draw a Democratic challenger, and ran against nominal Libertarian opposition)

Burgess won his eighth term in the U.S. House in 2016. With 211,730 votes (66.4%), he defeated Democratic nominee Eric Mauck and Libertarian Mark Boler, who polled 94,507 (29.6%) and 12,843 (4%), respectively.

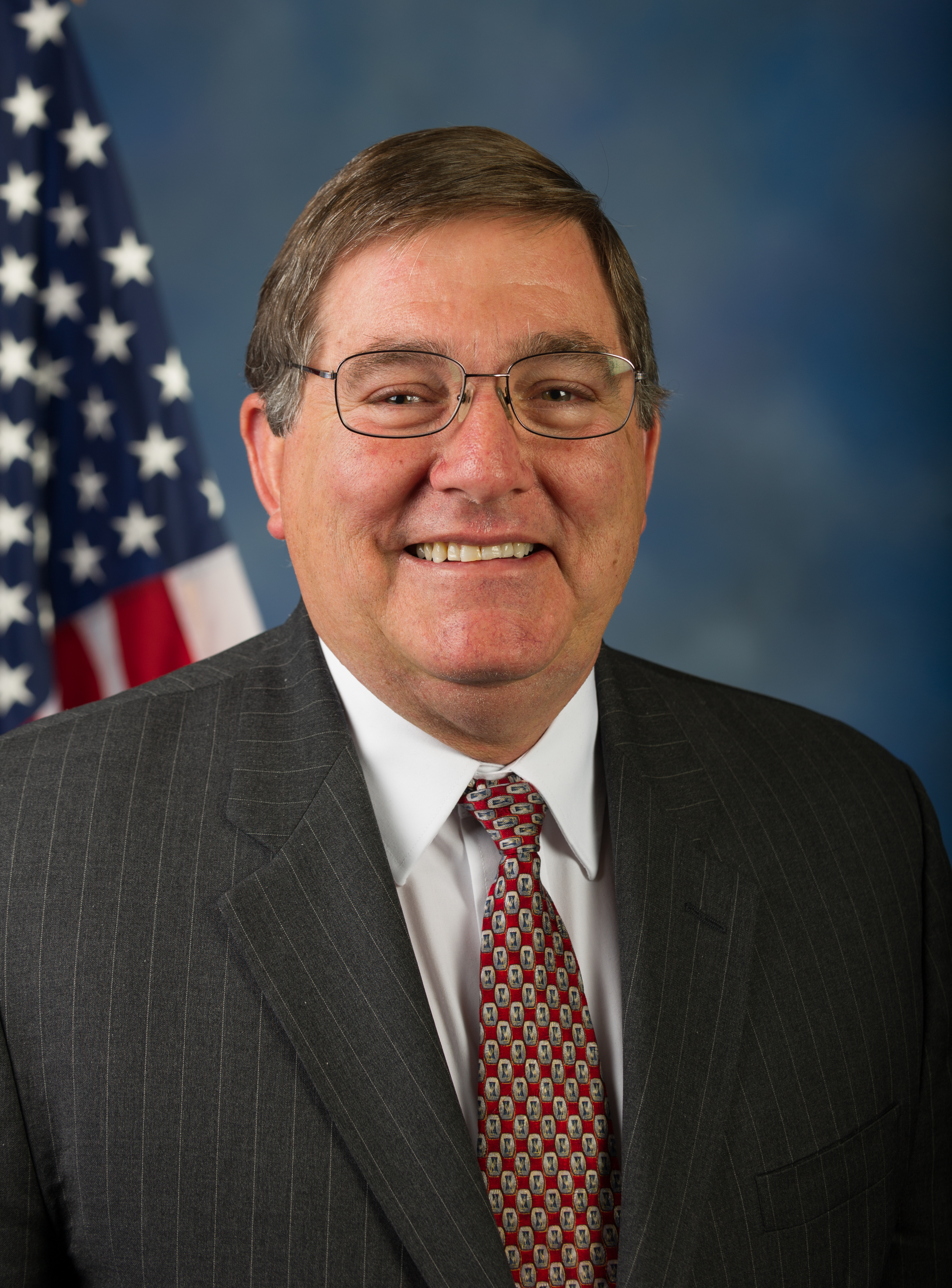
Burgess in 2013

Burgess won a ninth term in 2018. With 185,268 votes (59.4%), he defeated Democratic nominee Linsey Fagan, who polled 121,584 (39%). Another 5,008 (1.6%) went to Boler, who also ran in 2016.

Burgess was elected to a tenth term in 2020. He received 261,963 votes to Democratic nominee Carol Iannuzzi's 161,009 and Boler's 9,243, winning the election with 60.6% of the vote to 37.3% and 2.1%, respectively.

=== Tenure ===
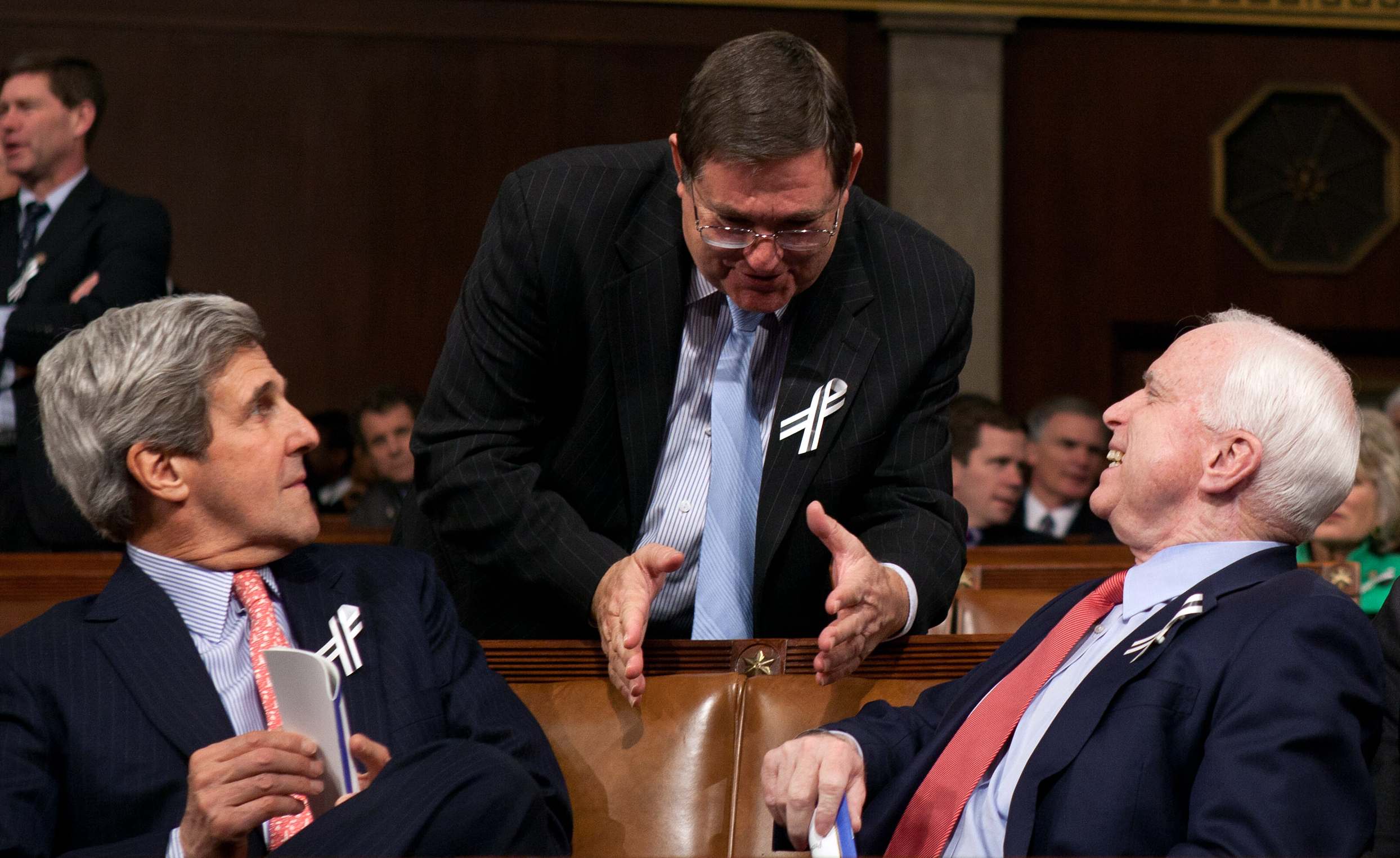
Rep. Burgess speaks to Senators John Kerry and John McCain in the House Chamber of the U.S. Capitol before the 2011 State of the Union Address

A member of the Republican Party and the Tea Party caucus, Burgess was considered a conservative member of the House. Through 2011, he had a lifetime rating of 93.59% from the American Conservative Union. Burgess signed Americans for Tax Reform's Taxpayer Protection Pledge.

==== Impeachment of Obama ====
On August 9, 2011, Burgess met with a Tea Party group in Keller, Texas, to discuss his vote to raise the debt ceiling. When a constituent asked whether the House was considering impeaching President Barack Obama, Burgess responded, "It needs to happen, and I agree with you it would tie things up ... No question about that."

==== Abortion ====
In 2013, Burgess voted for legislation to ban abortion after the 22nd week of pregnancy.

Burgess has been a staunch pro-life advocate over the course of his career.

==== Immigration and refugees ====
Burgess opposed the Obama administration's Deferred Action for Childhood Arrivals (DACA) program. In 2010, he voted against the DREAM Act.

Burgess supported President Donald Trump's 2017 executive order to impose a temporary ban on entry to the U.S. to citizens of seven Muslim-majority countries, saying that Trump was "well within his authority" to issue the order and that "Congress should remain involved in the process and provide legislation to strengthen not only border security but vetting those who wish to enter the country through any means."

Burgess sponsored H.R. 6202, the American Tech Workforce Act of 2021, introduced by Representative Jim Banks. The legislation would establish a wage floor for the high-skill H-1B visa program, thereby significantly reducing employer dependence on the program. The bill would also eliminate the Optional Practical Training program that allows foreign graduates to stay and work in the United States.

==== Health care ====
Burgess was one of nine medical doctors in Congress, and one of seven in the House of Representatives. In May 2009, Congressional Quarterly wrote that Burgess had "become a prominent voice on health care issues" in the House. Since the 111th United States Congress, he has chaired the GOP Doctor's Caucus, a group of 19 medical professionals in the House Republican Conference.

Burgess supports the repeal of the Patient Protection and Affordable Care Act, also known as the ACA or Obamacare. At the 2017 Conservative Political Action Conference, he said he favored covering fewer Americans with health insurance. Burgess said, "If the numbers drop, I would say that's a good thing, because we've restored personal liberty in this country."

==== Energy and the environment ====
As a member of the United States House Energy Subcommittee on Energy and Power, Burgess has been active in the debate over energy policy. In 2011, he submitted an amendment to the 2012 Energy and Water Appropriations Act to defund part of the act that established higher efficiency standards for household light bulbs. Burgess's claims that the standards represented a "ban" on conventional light bulbs were rated as "Mostly False" by the fact-checking website PolitiFact.com. On April 30, 2015, Burgess again introduced an amendment to the $35.4 billion fiscal 2016 energy and water spending bill that would defund the Department of Energy enforcement of incandescent light bulb efficiency standards, which passed 232–189, largely on party lines.

Burgess denies the scientific consensus on climate change. In a March 8, 2011, hearing before the Subcommittee on Energy and Power of the House Committee on Energy and Commerce on the efforts of the Environmental Protection Agency to regulate greenhouse gases, Burgess said "My opinion, for what it is worth, is that the science behind global temperature changes is not settled."

==== Lowering the voting age ====
In March 2019, Burgess was the lone Republican to vote to lower the voting age to 16.

==== Financial disclosures ====
In January 2022, Business Insider reported that Burgess had violated the Stop Trading on Congressional Knowledge (STOCK) Act of 2012, a federal transparency and conflict-of-interest law, by failing to properly disclose a sale of stock in Cigna Corp.

==== Iraq ====
In June 2021, Burgess was one of 49 House Republicans to vote to repeal the AUMF against Iraq.

==== Syria ====
In 2023, Burgess was among 47 Republicans to vote in favor of H.Con.Res. 21, which directed President Joe Biden to remove U.S. troops from Syria within 180 days.

==== Israel-Palestine ====
Burgess voted to provide Israel with support following October 7 attacks.

=== Legislation ===
On February 25, 2014, Burgess introduced the Trauma Systems and Regionalization of Emergency Care Reauthorization Act (H.R. 4080; 113th Congress), a bill that would amend the Public Health Service Act to authorize funding for public and private entities that provide trauma and emergency care services and for the administration of the Federal Interagency Committee on Emergency Medical Services (FICEMS).

=== Committee assignments ===
Burgess's committee assignments included:

- Committee on Budget
- Committee on Rules
  - Subcommittee on Legislative and Budget Process
- Committee on Energy and Commerce
  - Subcommittee on Digital Commerce and Consumer Protection
  - Subcommittee on Health
  - Subcommittee on Oversight and Investigations

=== Caucus memberships ===
- Congressional NextGen 9-1-1 Caucus
- Congressional Ukraine Caucus
- Republican Governance Group
- Congressional Taiwan Caucus
- Republican Study Committee
- Congressional Western Caucus
- Congressional Motorcycle Caucus
- GOP Doctor's Caucus
- Republican Main Street Partnership
- Rare Disease Caucus

== Works ==
- Burgess, Michael (2011). Doctor in the House: A Physician-Turned-Congressman Offers His Prescription for Scrapping Obamacare – and Saving America's Medical System. Midpoint Trade Books. ISBN 978-1-936488-25-4.

== See also ==
- Physicians in the United States Congress

U.S. House of Representatives
Preceded by Dick Armey	Member of the U.S. House of Representatives from Texas's 26th congressional district 2003–2025	Succeeded by Brandon Gill
Preceded by Tom Cole	Chair of the House Rules Committee; 2024–2025	Succeeded by Virginia Foxx
U.S. order of precedence (ceremonial)
Preceded by Ron Paul as Former U.S. Representative	Order of precedence of the United States as Former U.S. Representative	Succeeded by Buck McKeon as Former U.S. Representative
