= Neal Dunn =

American surgeon and politician (born 1953)

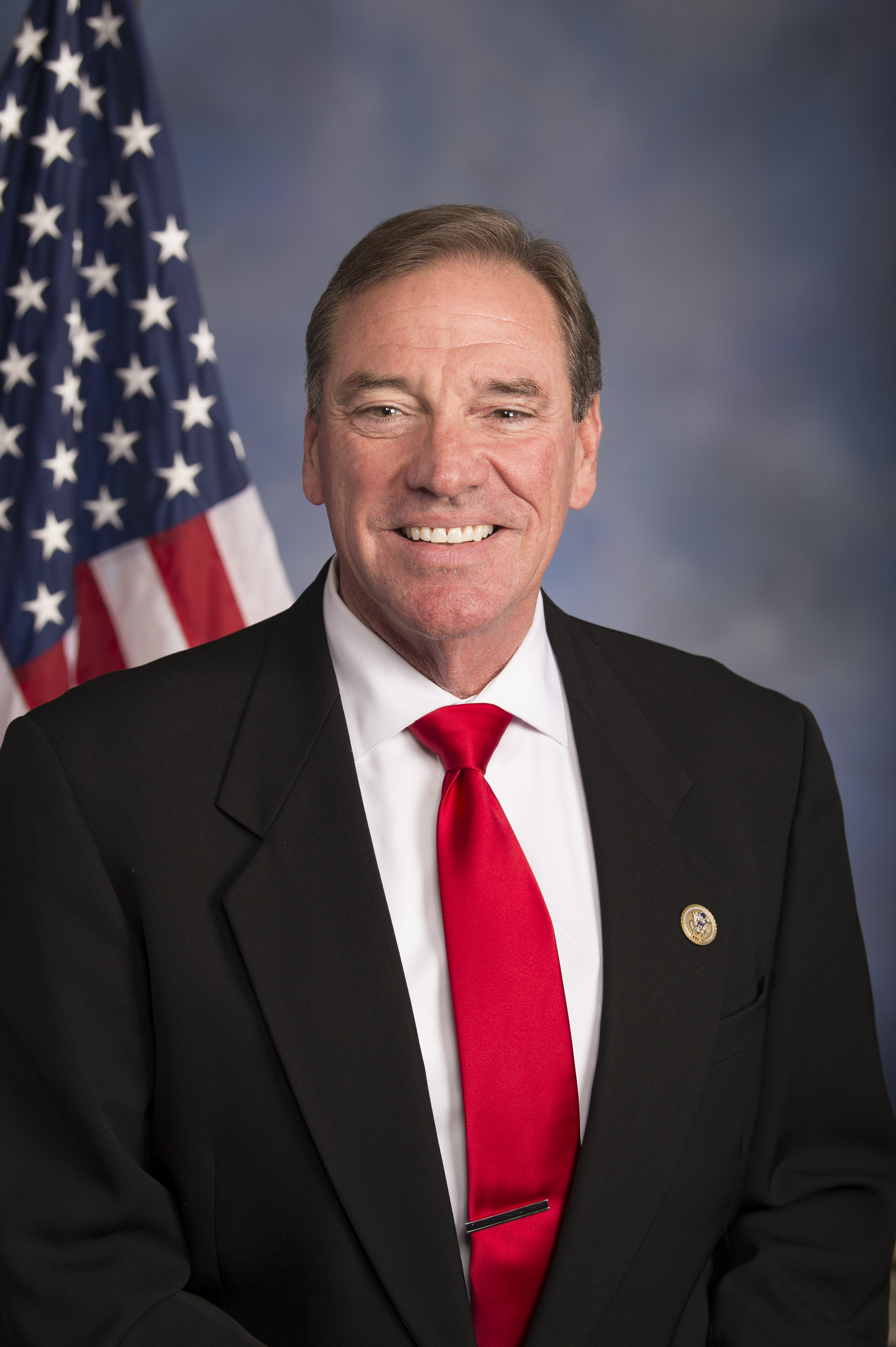
- Official portrait, 2017

Member of the U.S. House of Representatives from Florida's 2nd district
- Incumbent
- Assumed office January 3, 2017
- Preceded by: Gwen Graham (redistricted)

Personal details
- Born: Neal Patrick Dunn; February 16, 1953 (age 73) Boston, Massachusetts, U.S.
- Party: Republican
- Spouse: Leah Dunn (m. 1987)
- Children: 3
- Education: Washington and Lee University (BS); George Washington University (MD)
- Website: House website Campaign website

Military service
- Branch/service: United States Army
- Years of service: 1979–1990
- Rank: Major
- Unit: Army Medical Corps

Neal Patrick Dunn (born February 16, 1953) is an American surgeon and politician serving as the U.S. representative for Florida's 2nd congressional district since 2017. A member of the Republican Party, Dunn is a medical doctor who served in the United States Army for eleven years, reaching the rank of major.

On January 13, 2026, Dunn announced he would not seek re-election in 2026. In March 2026, President Donald Trump and Speaker of the House Mike Johnson publicly confirmed a serious heart condition, from which Dunn would have likely died by June if not for an emergency surgery.

== Early life and career ==
Dunn was born in Boston, Massachusetts, on February 16, 1953. He earned a Bachelor of Science in interdisciplinary sciences from Washington and Lee University, and a Doctor of Medicine from the George Washington University School of Medicine & Health Sciences. He completed his medical internship at Walter Reed Army Medical Center. Dunn served in the United States Army for 11 years of active duty, reaching the rank of major. He then settled in Panama City, Florida, where he helped found the Panama City Urological Center and the Panama City Surgery Center, and was the founding chairman of Summit Bank.

== U.S. House of Representatives ==
=== Elections ===
==== 2016 ====
In August 2015, Dunn announced his candidacy for the United States House of Representatives for Florida's 2nd congressional district in the 2016 elections. The district's one-term incumbent, Democrat Gwen Graham, opted to retire after court-ordered redistricting made the district heavily Republican. He won the Republican nomination, narrowly defeating attorneys Mary Thomas and Ken Sukhia, and defeated Walter Dartland in the general election. He was sworn in on January 3, 2017.

==== 2018 ====
In 2018, Dunn won reelection against challenger Bob Rackleff, 67.4% to 32.6%.

==== 2020 ====
Constituents voiced frustration with Dunn for his refusal to host town halls. Dunn held multiple virtual town hall meetings since the COVID-19 pandemic began in March 2020.

Dunn was reelected in 2020 with 97.9% of the vote. He had no primary election or official general election opponents.

==== 2022 ====
In 2022, Dunn defeated U.S. Representative Al Lawson with 59.8% of the vote. The boundaries of the district had been redrawn as determined by the 2020 Florida redistricting cycle.

==== 2024 ====
Dunn won re-election to a fifth term with 61.64% of the vote against Yen Bailey.

=== Committee assignments ===
For the 118th Congress:

- Committee on Energy and Commerce
  - Subcommittee on Communications and Technology
  - Subcommittee on Health
  - Subcommittee on Innovation, Data, and Commerce
- Select Committee on Strategic Competition between the United States and the Chinese Communist Party

=== Caucus memberships ===
- House Border Security Caucus
- Conservative Climate Caucus
- Wildfire Caucus
- Congressional French Caucus
- House Army Caucus
- Friends of Belgium Caucus
- Bulgaria Caucus
- Congressional Wine Caucus
- Healthcare Innovation Caucus
- Republican Study Committee

== Political positions ==
Dunn's campaign website identifies him as conservative.

=== Gun policy ===
He opposes a ban on semi-automatic weapons. From 2015 to 2016, Dunn accepted $1,000 from the NRA-PVF.

=== Net neutrality ===
Along with 107 Republican members of Congress, Dunn sent a letter to Federal Communications Commission Chairman Ajit Pai on December 13, 2017, supporting his plan to repeal net neutrality protections ahead of the commission's vote. Dunn accepted $18,500 from the telecom industry before voting to repeal the rule.

=== Tax reform ===
Dunn voted for the Tax Cuts and Jobs Act of 2017, calling the bill "good medicine for America". He believes it will benefit many generations of Americans with a "great economy in which there will be jobs, there will be opportunity, there's possibilities for literally a whole new generation or two of Americans". Dunn says he has received support from "mostly small businessmen" in his district for supporting the bill.

=== Education ===
Dunn supports defunding the Department of Education.

=== Healthcare ===
Dunn supports repealing the Affordable Care Act, which he says is "failing", saying "no one can afford" the premiums and deductibles.

=== 2021 storming of the Capitol ===
After the 2021 storming of the U.S. Capitol, Dunn condemned the rioters, but still voted to object to the certification of several states' electoral votes.

=== Israel ===
Dunn voted to provide Israel with support following the October 7, 2023, Hamas-led attacks on Israel.

=== Immigration ===
In 2026, Dunn was a cosponsor of the DIGNIDAD Act, which proposes a pathway to legal status for up to 12 million illegal immigrants, paired with stricter border enforcement and mandatory work and restitution requirements.

=== Veterans ===
Dunn voted against the Honoring our PACT Act of 2022, which expanded VA benefits to veterans exposed to toxic chemicals during their military service.

== Personal life ==
Dunn and his wife, Leah, have three sons and three grandsons. He announced on January 13, 2026, that he would retire from Congress rather than seek another term in 2026. It was reported the following month that the Speaker of the United States House of Representatives Mike Johnson told Republican donors that Dunn might have been terminally ill. On March 16, 2026, during a broadcast board meeting of the Kennedy Center, President Donald Trump shared private details of Dunn's condition, which he revealed was a heart problem. President Trump disclosed that because he needed his vote, the White House Medical Unit had gone to see Dunn and that "he was on the operating table, like, two hours later." Trump also disclosed that Dunn "would be dead by June," to which Johnson responded, "Okay, that wasn't public."

== Electoral history ==
Florida 2nd Congressional District Republican Primary, 2016
Party	Candidate	Votes	%
Republican	Neal Dunn	33,886	41.4
Republican	Mary Thomas	32,178	39.3
Republican	Ken Sukhia	15,826	19.3
Total votes		81,890	100.0

Florida 2nd Congressional District General Election, 2016
Party	Candidate	Votes	%
Republican	Neal Dunn	231,163	67.3
Democratic	Walter Dartland	102,801	29.9
Libertarian	Rob Lapham	9,395	2.7
Write-in votes	Antoine Edward Roberts	3	0.1
Total votes		343,362	100.0

Florida 2nd Congressional District General Election, 2018
Party	Candidate	Votes	%
Republican	Neal Dunn (incumbent)	199,335	67.4
Democratic	Bob Rackleff	96,233	32.6
Total votes		295,568	100.0

Florida 2nd Congressional District General Election, 2020
Party	Candidate	Votes	%
Republican	Neal Dunn (incumbent)	305,337	97.9
Write-in votes	Kim O'Connor	6,662	2.1
Total votes		311,999	100.0

Florida 2nd Congressional District General Election, 2022
Party	Candidate	Votes	%
Republican	Neal Dunn (incumbent)	180,236	59.8
Democratic	Alfred Lawson (incumbent)	121,153	40.2
Total votes		301,389	100.0

Florida 2nd Congressional District Republican Primary, 2024
Party	Candidate	Votes	%
Republican	Neal Dunn (incumbent)	69,113	82.7
Republican	Rhonda Woodward	14,456	17.3
Total votes		83,569	100.0

Florida 2nd Congressional District General Election, 2024
Party	Candidate	Votes	%
Republican	Neal Dunn (incumbent)	247,685	61.7
Democratic	Yen Bailey	154,010	38.3
Total votes		401,695	100.0

== See also ==
- Physicians in the United States Congress

U.S. House of Representatives
Preceded by Gwen Graham	Member of the U.S. House of Representatives from Florida's 2nd congressional district 2017–present	Incumbent
U.S. order of precedence (ceremonial)
Preceded by Lou Correa	United States representatives by seniority 162nd	Succeeded by Adriano Espaillat
