= 2012 United States Senate election in Wyoming =

- November 6, 2012
- Turnout: 58.9% (voting eligible)
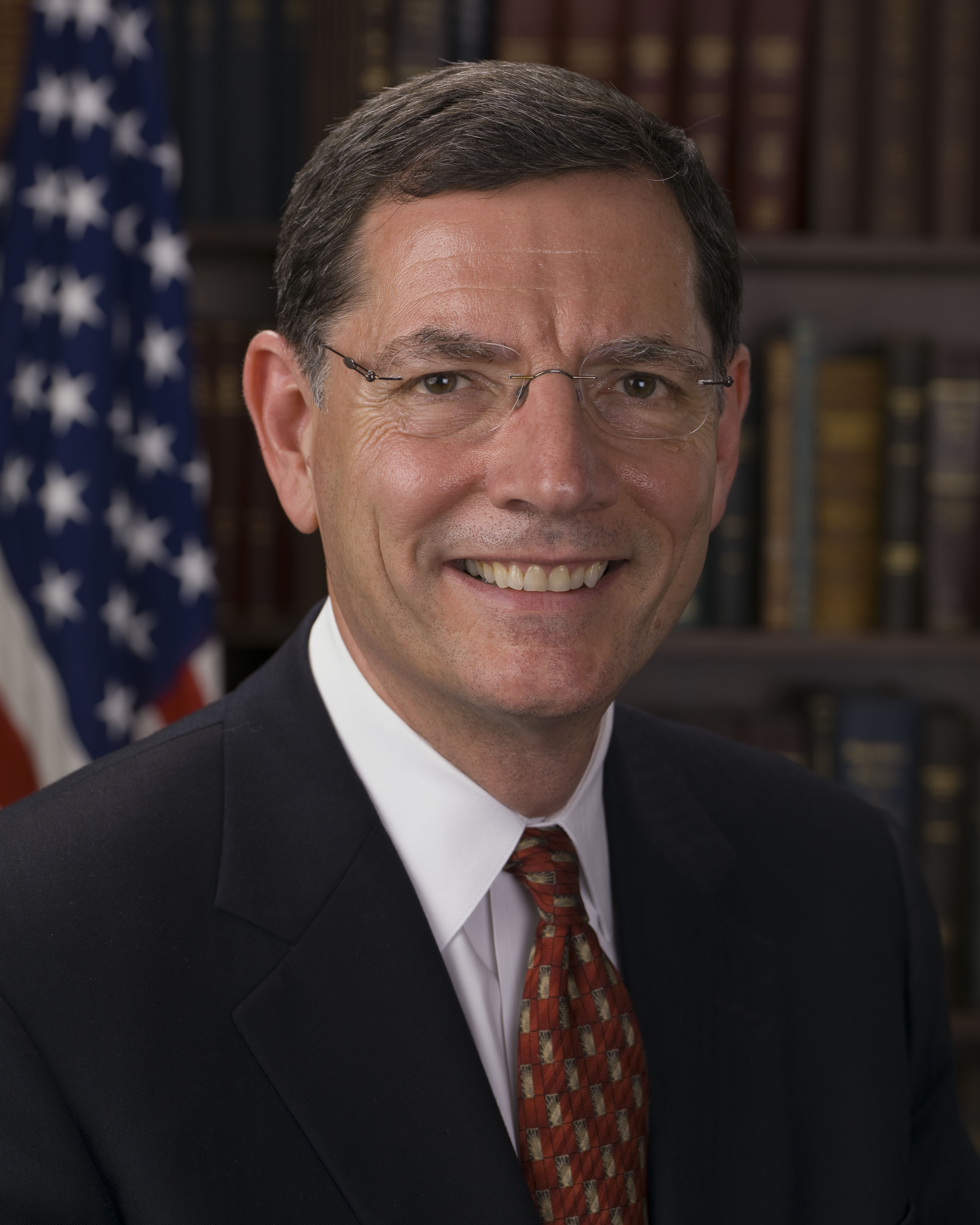

Nominee	John Barrasso	Tim Chesnut
Party	Republican	Democratic
Popular vote	185,250	53,019
Percentage	75.66%	21.65%
- County results Barrasso: 50–60% 60–70% 70–80% 80–90%
U.S. senator before election
John Barrasso
Republican
Elected U.S. Senator
John Barrasso
Republican

The 2012 United States Senate election in Wyoming took place on November 6, 2012, alongside a U.S. presidential election, as well as other elections to the United States Senate and House of Representatives and various state and local elections. Incumbent Republican U.S. Senator John Barrasso won re-election to a first full term.

The primary elections were held on August 21, 2012.

== Background ==
Republican state senator John Barrasso was appointed to the U.S. Senate on June 22, 2007, by then-governor Dave Freudenthal after U.S. Senator Craig Thomas died on June 4, 2007.

Barrasso defeated Nick Carter with 73.4% of the vote in a 2008 special election to serve the remainder of the senatorial term. He was highly popular in the state, with 69% of voters approving of him.

== Republican primary ==
=== Candidates ===
- John Barrasso, incumbent U.S. senator
- Thomas Bleming, former soldier of fortune
- Emmett Mavy, management consultant

=== Results ===
Republican primary results
Party	Candidate	Votes	%
Republican	John Barrasso (incumbent)	73,516	89.9
Republican	Thomas Bleming	5,080	6.2
Republican	Emmett Mavy	2,873	3.5
Republican	Write-in	279	0.3
Total votes		81,748	100

== Democratic primary ==
=== Candidates ===
- William Bryk, attorney from Brooklyn and perennial candidate
- Tim Chesnut, member of the Albany County Board of Commissioners
- Al Hamburg, retired painter and perennial candidate

=== Results ===
Results by county: Chesnut: 40–50%; 50–60%; 60–70%; 80–90%

Democratic primary results
Party	Candidate	Votes	%
Democratic	Tim Chesnut	9,173	53.7
Democratic	Al Hamburg	4,630	27.1
Democratic	William Bryk	3,047	17.8
Democratic	Write-in	222	1.3
Total votes		17,072	100

== General election ==
=== Candidates ===
- John Barrasso (Republican), incumbent U.S. senator
- Tim Chesnut (Democratic), member of the Albany County Board of Commissioners
- Joel Otto (Wyoming Country), rancher

=== Debates ===
- Complete video of debate, October 31, 2012 - C-SPAN

=== Predictions ===
Source	Ranking	As of
The Cook Political Report	Solid R	November 1, 2012
Sabato's Crystal Ball	Safe R	November 5, 2012
Rothenberg Political Report	Safe R	November 2, 2012
Real Clear Politics	Safe R	November 5, 2012

=== Polling ===
Hypothetical polling

John Barrasso vs. Dave Freudenthal

Poll source	Date(s) administered	Sample size	Margin of error	John Barrasso (R)	Dave Freudenthal (D)	Other	Undecided
Public Policy Polling	January 4–5, 2011	1,039	±3.0%	56%	36%	—	9%

=== Results ===
2012 United States Senate election in Wyoming
Party	Candidate	Votes	%	±%
Republican	John Barrasso (incumbent)	185,250	75.66%	+2.31%
Democratic	Tim Chesnut	53,019	21.65%	−4.88%
Wyoming Country	Joel Otto	6,176	2.52%	N/A
n/a	Write-ins	417	0.17%	+0.05%
Total votes		244,862	100.0%	N/A
Republican hold				

==== By county ====
Vote breakdown by county
	John Barrasso Republican		Tim Chestnut Democrat		All Others	
County	Votes	%	Votes	%	Votes	%
Albany	9,096	57.0%	6,469	40.5%'	406	2.5%
Big Horn	4,560	86.6%	554	10.5%	`54	2.9%
Campbell	15,028	87.0%	1,668	9.7%	572	3.3%
Carbon	4,864	76.0%	1,405	22.0%	131	2.0%
Converse	5,365	85.3%	772	12.3%	151	2.4%
Crook	3,177	87.3%	348	9.6%	116	3.3%
Fremont	12,369	74.2%	3,767	22.6%	538	3.2%
Goshen	4,633	80.7%	944	16.4%	162	2.8%
Hot Springs	2,078	83.2%	354	14.2%	67	2.7%
Johnson	3,634	86.2%	492	11.7%	91	2.1%
Laramie	26,712	69.0%	10,950	28.3%	1,026	2.7%
Lincoln	7,230	85.2%	1,070	12.6%	188	2.2%
Natrona	24,431	76.6%	6,533	20.5%	924	2.9%
Niobrara	1,110	87.8%	124	9.8%	30	2.4%
Park	11,789	82.1%	2,183	15.2%	385	2.6%
Platte	3,420	76.2%	905	20.2%	165	3.7%
Sheridan	11,174	78.9%	2,757	19.5%	230	1.6%
Sublette	3,631	84.2%	576	13.4%	103	2.4%
Sweetwater	12,399	74.6%	3,778	22.7%	452	2.7%
Teton	5,562	50.7%	5,140	46.9%	267	2.5%
Uinta	6,780	80.9%	1,365	16.3%	238	2.8%
Washakie	3,321	84.6%	529	13.5%	74	1.9%
Weston	2,887	86.3%	336	10.0%	123	3.7%

== See also ==
- 2012 United States Senate elections
- 2012 United States House of Representatives election in Wyoming
