= John Barrasso =

American physician and politician (born 1952)

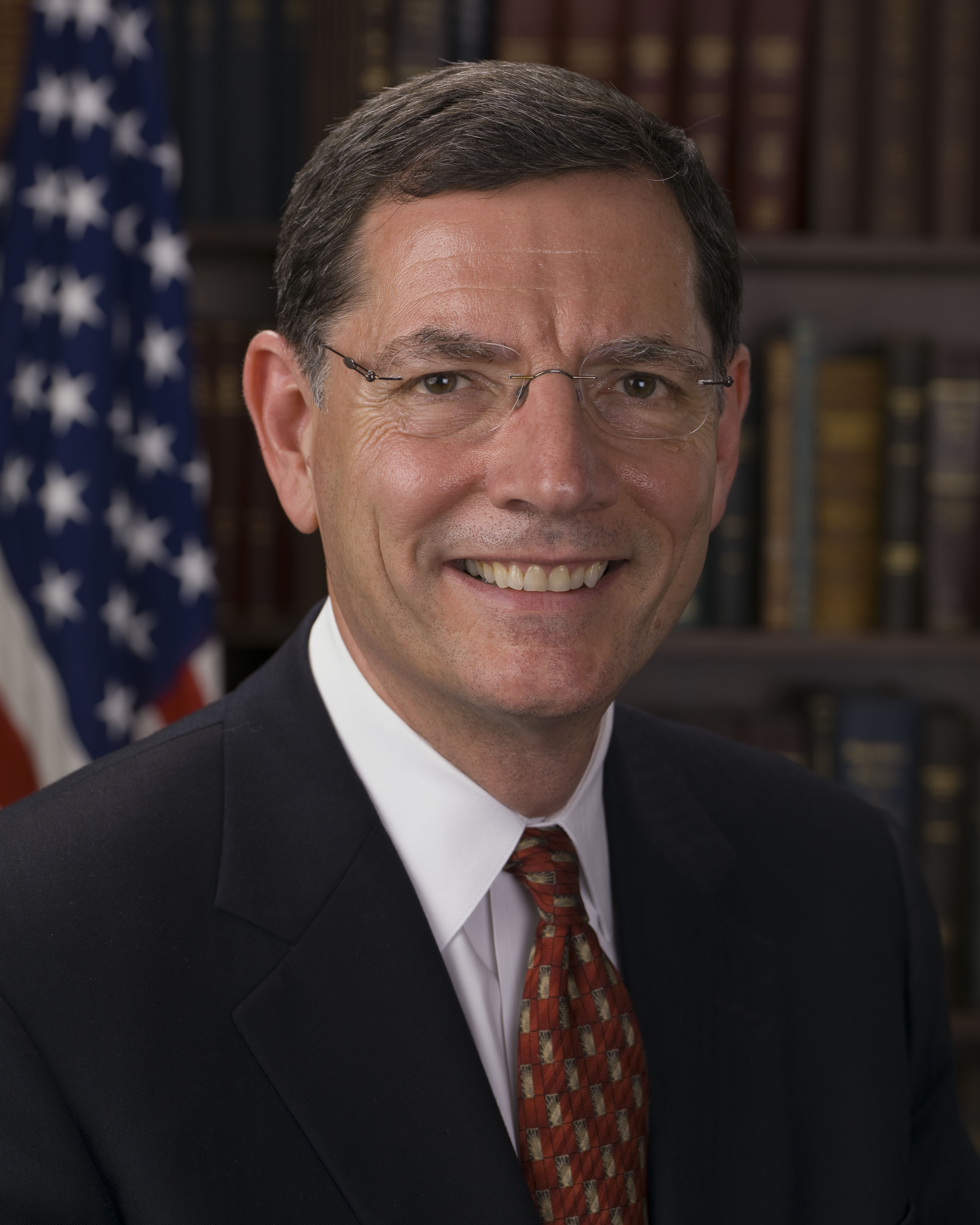
- Official portrait, 2010

Senate Minority Whip-designate
- Assuming office January 3, 2027
- Leader: John Thune (designate)
- Succeeding: Dick Durbin

Senate Majority Whip
- Incumbent
- Assumed office January 3, 2025
- Leader: John Thune
- Preceded by: Dick Durbin
Senate positions
Ranking Member of the Senate Energy Committee
In office February 3, 2021 – January 3, 2025
Preceded by	Joe Manchin
Succeeded by	Martin Heinrich
Chair of the Senate Republican Conference
In office January 3, 2019 – January 3, 2025
Leader	Mitch McConnell
Vice Chair	Joni Ernst; Shelley Moore Capito
Preceded by	John Thune
Succeeded by	Tom Cotton
Chair of the Senate Environment Committee
In office January 3, 2017 – February 3, 2021
Preceded by	Jim Inhofe
Succeeded by	Tom Carper
Chair of the Senate Republican Policy Committee
In office January 26, 2012 – January 3, 2019
Leader	Mitch McConnell
Preceded by	John Thune
Succeeded by	Roy Blunt
Chair of the Senate Indian Affairs Committee
In office January 3, 2015 – January 3, 2017
Preceded by	Jon Tester
Succeeded by	John Hoeven

United States Senator from Wyoming
- Incumbent
- Assumed office June 22, 2007 Serving with Cynthia Lummis
- Preceded by: Craig L. Thomas

Member of the Wyoming Senate from the 27th district
- In office January 3, 2003 – June 22, 2007
- Preceded by: Bruce Hinchey
- Succeeded by: Bill Landen

Personal details
- Born: John Anthony Barrasso III; July 21, 1952 (age 74) Reading, Pennsylvania, U.S.
- Party: Republican
- Spouse(s): Linda Nix (divorced) Bobbi Brown (m. 2008; died 2024)
- Children: 3
- Education: Rensselaer Polytechnic Institute (attended); Georgetown University (BS, MD)
- Website: Senate website Campaign website
- Barrasso's voice Barrasso's on the Bipartisan Safer Communities Act. Recorded June 23, 2022

John Anthony Barrasso III (/bəˈrɑːsoʊ/ bə-RAH-soh; born July 21, 1952) is an American physician and politician serving as the senior United States senator from Wyoming, a seat he has held since 2007. A member of the Republican Party, he served in the Wyoming State Senate from 2003 to 2007. In 2025, he became Senate majority whip, the second-ranking Senate Republican.

Born and raised in Reading, Pennsylvania, Barrasso graduated from Georgetown University, where he received his B.S. and M.D. He conducted his medical residency at Yale University before moving to Wyoming and beginning a private orthopedics practice in Casper.

Barrasso first ran for U.S. Senate in 1996, narrowly losing the Republican primary to Mike Enzi. In 2002, he was elected to the State Senate, where he stayed until his appointment to the U.S. Senate after the 2007 death of incumbent Craig L. Thomas. He was elected to finish Thomas's term in 2008, and was reelected in 2012. In 2018, Barrasso was selected as chair of the Senate Republican Conference. He has been the dean of Wyoming's congressional delegation since 2021, when Enzi retired from the Senate.

== Early life, education, and medical career ==
Barrasso was born in Reading, Pennsylvania, on July 21, 1952, the son of Louise M. (née DeCisco) and John Anthony Barrasso Jr. Barrasso's father was a cement finisher who had a ninth-grade education. Barrasso is a third-generation Italian-American with paternal grandparents from Carife, Campania and maternal grandparents from Vasto, Abruzzo.

Barrasso is a graduate of the former Central Catholic High School, which later merged with Holy Name High School to form Berks Catholic High School. He attended Rensselaer Polytechnic Institute for two years and joined the Phi Kappa Tau fraternity. Barrasso graduated Phi Beta Kappa from Georgetown in 1974 with a Bachelor of Science degree in biology. He received his M.D. degree from the Georgetown University School of Medicine in 1978 and conducted his residency at Yale Medical School in New Haven, Connecticut.

In 1983, after completing his residency at Yale, Barrasso moved to Wyoming with his then-wife, Linda Nix. He joined a private orthopedic practice in Casper and for a time was the Wyoming Medical Center's chief of staff. Barrasso was a board-certified orthopedic surgeon in private practice in Casper from 1983 to 2007. He has served as president of the Wyoming Medical Society. Barrasso was also a rodeo physician for the Professional Rodeo Cowboys Association (and a member of the "Cowboy Joe Club") and volunteered as a team physician for Casper College and several local high schools.

== 1996 U.S. Senate election ==
Barrasso ran for the Republican nomination for the U.S. Senate in 1996 for the seat being vacated by Republican Alan K. Simpson, losing narrowly to State Senator Mike Enzi, 32% to 30%, in a nine-candidate election. Enzi garnered support due to his pro-life stance, while Barrasso—who had been expected to win the primary—identified as pro-choice at the time.

== Wyoming Senate (2003-2007) ==
Barrasso was elected to the Wyoming Senate unopposed in 2002 and reelected unopposed in 2006. He represented Wyoming's 27th Senate District, including part of Casper. During his State Senate tenure, he chaired the Transportation and Highways Committee.

== U.S. Senate (2007–present) ==
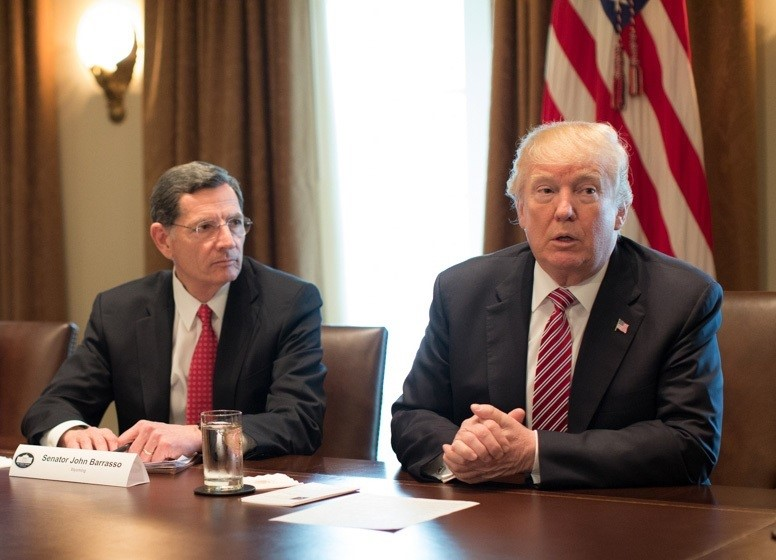
Barrasso with President Donald Trump in 2018

=== Appointment ===
On June 22, 2007, Governor Dave Freudenthal appointed Barrasso to replace Senator Craig L. Thomas, who had died in office earlier that month. Under state law, Freudenthal was able to consider only three individuals chosen by the Republican State Central Committee because the seat was vacated by a Republican. The others were former State Treasurer Cynthia Lummis of Cheyenne, and former Republican state chairman and Justice Department attorney Tom Sansonetti.

=== Elections ===
==== 2008 ====
Barrasso won the Republican nomination for the balance of Thomas's third term. He then won the special election in a landslide, defeating Democratic nominee Nick Carter with 73% of the vote.

==== 2012 ====
Barrasso ran for reelection to a first full term in 2012. He faced two opponents for the Republican nomination, which he won with 90% of the vote. In the general election, he defeated Democratic nominee Tim Chestnut with 76% of the vote.

==== 2018 ====
Barrasso faced Dave Dodson and four other challengers in the 2018 Republican primary; he won the primary with 65% of the vote. Barrasso defeated Democrat Gary Trauner and Libertarian Joseph Porambo in the general election, receiving 67% of the vote.

==== 2024 ====
In the primary, Barrasso faced Casper Executive Reid Rasner, who attacked Barrasso for his support of the Foreign Intelligence Surveillance Act, among other issues. Barrasso defeated Rasner, 67.9% to 24.5%. He won the general election against Democratic nominee Scott Morrow with 75.1% of the vote.

=== Tenure ===
At the time of his appointment to the U.S. Senate in 2007, Barrasso was quoted as saying on his application: "I believe in limited government, lower taxes, less spending, traditional family values, local control and a strong national defense"; he also said that he had "voted for prayer in schools, against gay marriage and [had] sponsored legislation to protect the sanctity of life".

In 2018, Barrasso was selected as chair of the Senate Republican Conference. In 2024, he declined to run for Senate Republican leader and instead announced that he would run for Republican Whip.

During the COVID-19 pandemic in the United States, Barrasso voted against the American Rescue Plan Act of 2021 but for the PPP Extension Act and the COVID-19 Hate Crimes Act.

Starting in the 119th Congress, he is the Senate whip of the Republican Party.

==== 119th United States Congress Committee assignments ====
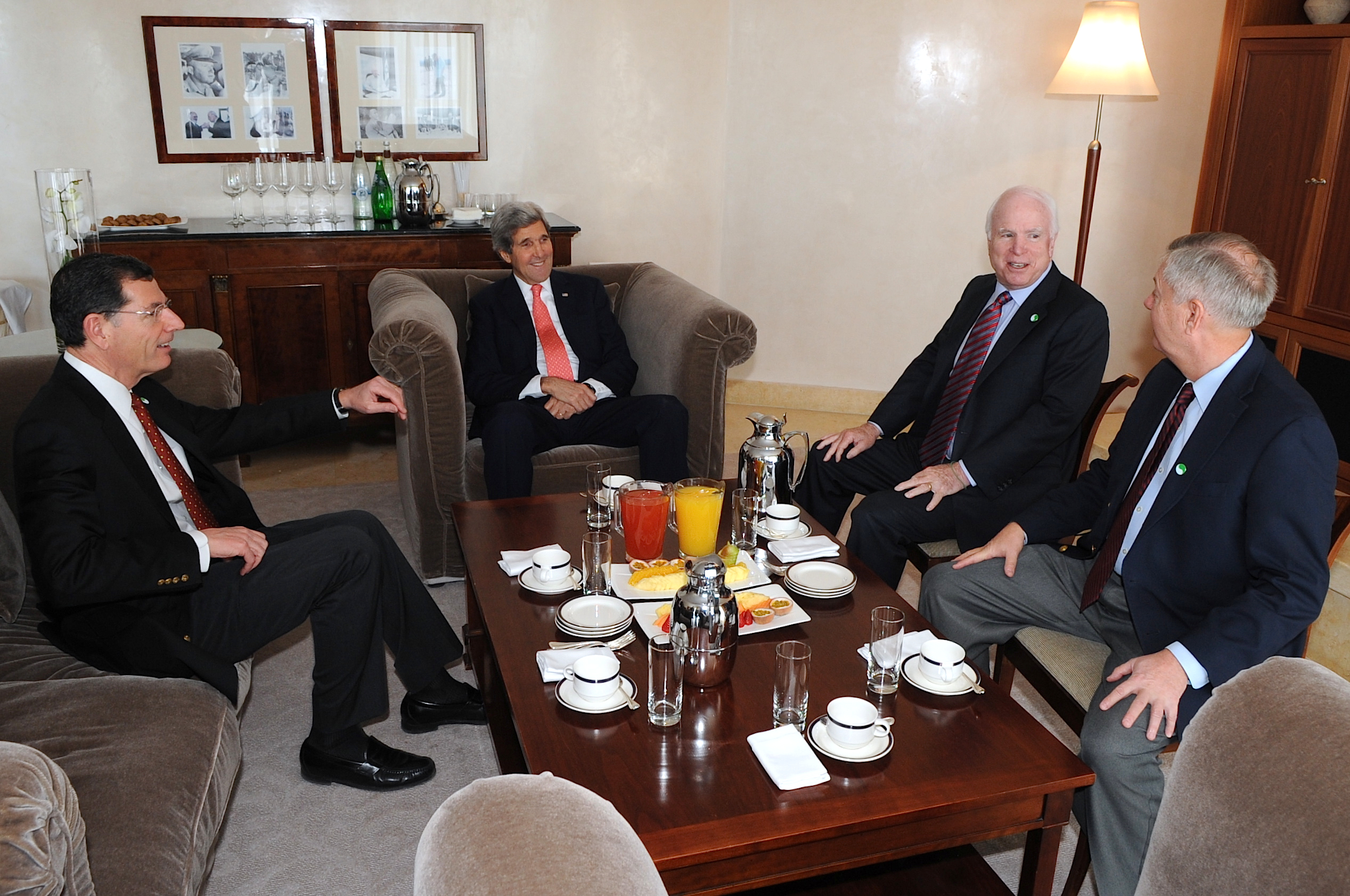
Secretary of State John Kerry meets with Senators John McCain, Lindsey Graham and John Barrasso in Jerusalem on January 3, 2014

- Committee on Energy and Natural Resources
- Committee on Finance
- Committee on Foreign Relations

==== Caucus memberships ====
- Rare Disease Caucus

== Political positions ==
=== Abortion ===
When Barrasso ran for the 1996 Republican nomination for the U.S. Senate, he presented himself as a supporter of abortion rights. Following his loss in 1996, Barrasso's position on abortion (and on other issues) shifted in a conservative direction.

During his tenure in the Wyoming Legislature, Barrasso sponsored an unsuccessful bill to treat the killing of a pregnant woman as a double homicide. He has voted to prohibit federal funding for abortion.

=== Capital punishment ===
Barrasso co-sponsored the "Thin Blue Line Act", which would have required the death penalty for anyone convicted of killing a first responder.

=== Gun laws ===
In April 2013, Barrasso was one of 46 senators to vote against a bill that would have expanded background checks for all gun buyers. He voted with 40 Republicans and five Democrats to stop the bill.

=== Health care ===
Barrasso voted against the Affordable Care Act (also known as Obamacare) in December 2009, and against the Health Care and Education Reconciliation Act of 2010. He was part of a group of 13 senators that drafted the Senate version of the American Health Care Act of 2017, an Obamacare repeal bill that failed to pass.

=== Environment and energy ===
When asked in 2014 whether human activity contributes to climate change, Barrasso denied the existence of the scientific consensus on climate change, saying that "the role human activity plays is not known." In 2021, he admitted, "We believe that mankind is certainly contributing" to climate change.

Barrasso was a leading opponent of President Barack Obama's climate change policies.

Barrasso opposed the Central Intelligence Agency's creation of its Center on Climate Change and National Security in 2009. In 2011, he introduced a bill that would prevent the Environmental Protection Agency from limiting carbon dioxide emissions.

Barrasso and Senators Mike Enzi and Pat Roberts introduced a bill to remove tax credits for electric cars.

According to OpenSecrets, as of 2017, Barrasso had received over $585,000 from the oil and gas industry since 2012.

In 2019, Barrasso inaccurately claimed that "livestock will be banned" as a result of the Green New Deal, and said we needed to "say goodbye to dairy, to beef, to family farms, to ranches. American favorites like cheeseburgers and milkshake would become a thing of the past."

In September 2020, Barrasso supported a measure to dramatically limit the use of hydrofluorocarbons used in refrigerants and other applications that have contributed to global warming.

In November 2022, Barrasso criticized China's "developing country advantage" in international climate agreements, arguing that China is given unfair privileges in climate agreements that do not reflect its economic growth.

In November 2024, after Trump nominated fracking magnate Chris Wright for Secretary of Energy, Barrasso described Wright as an "energy innovator".

In July 2024, Barrasso and Joe Manchin introduced S. 4753, the Energy Permitting Reform Act of 2024, aiming to speed the permitting process for energy infrastructure and mineral development. The bill would affect both fossil fuel and electric power transmission projects.

=== Criminal justice ===
Barrasso delivers remarks on the Senate floor on the 2020s Minnesota fraud scandals; January 13, 2026.

Barrasso opposed the FIRST STEP Act, a bill that sought to reform the federal prison system. The bill passed 87–12 on December 18, 2018.

=== Foreign policy ===
Barrasso opposed the Russian-backed Nord Stream 2—a pipeline to deliver natural gas from Russia to Germany. Bloomberg News reported, "Congress brought forward bills authorizing the administration to levy sanctions against a consortium of five European energy companies that have partnered with [Russia's main gas company] Gazprom; at least one bill, sponsored by Republican Senator John Barrasso, would make them mandatory." In May 2022, during the Russo-Ukrainian War, Barrasso visited Kyiv and met with Ukrainian president Volodymyr Zelenskyy as a part of a U.S. Senate delegation to show support to Ukraine. The delegation also visited Finland to meet with President Sauli Niinistö and Prime Minister Sanna Marin to express support for Finland's application to join NATO.

In July 2025, Barrasso voted against two motions made by Senator Bernie Sanders to block arms sales to Israel.

In 2026, Barrasso voted against a Senate bill to require President Trump to seek congressional approval for the 2026 Iran war. Barrasso said that efforts to require congressional approval for war entailed "obstructing the president".

=== Donald Trump ===
After it was revealed in November 2018 that Trump had business dealings with Russia while a candidate in the 2016 election, Barrasso said, "The president is an international businessman; I’m not surprised he was doing international business." Asked whether Trump should have disclosed those business ties during the campaign, Barrasso said, "There were so many things involved in the 2016 campaign, it’s hard to point to what one thing influenced voters." Trump joined Barrasso on Thanksgiving 2019 in a surprise visit to American troops stationed at Bagram Air Base in Afghanistan. At the time, approximately 370 Wyoming National Guard soldiers were deployed in Europe and the Middle East, the most since 2009.

In December 2019, Barrasso appeared to promote Senator John Kennedy's views supporting the discredited conspiracy theory of Ukrainian interference in the 2016 U.S. presidential election.

In February 2021, Barrasso opposed the second impeachment of Donald Trump, calling it a "partisan crusade". On February 13, 2021, Barrasso voted to acquit Trump of inciting the 2021 United States Capitol attack. On May 28, 2021, Barrasso voted against creating the January 6 commission. In November 2021, Barrasso refused to condemn Trump for defending January 6 rioters who called for Pence's death.

=== Fiscal Responsibility Act of 2023 ===
Barrasso was among the 31 Senate Republicans who voted against final passage of the Fiscal Responsibility Act of 2023.

== Personal life ==
Barrasso has three children. He is divorced from Linda Nix. On August 11, 2007, during Cheyenne's annual Race for the Cure, Barrasso and Bobbi Brown, a breast cancer survivor and at the time the director of Barrasso's state senate offices, announced their engagement. Brown then resigned from her position in Barrasso's state senate offices. They were married on January 1, 2008, in Thermopolis. Brown died of brain cancer on January 25, 2024. She was known for being an advocate for mental health and suicide prevention.

Barrasso is a member of the board of directors of Presidential Classroom, and a member of the Casper Chamber of Commerce. He is a member of the Presbyterian Church.

== Electoral history ==
U.S. Senate special election in Wyoming, 2008
Party	Candidate	Votes	%	±%
Republican	John Barrasso (incumbent)	183,063	73.35%	+3.37%
Democratic	Nick Carter	66,202	26.53%	−3.33%
None	Write-ins	293	0.12%	
Majority		116,861	46.83%	+6.70%
Turnout		249,558		
Republican hold		Swing		

U.S. Senate Republican primary election in Wyoming, 2012
Party	Candidate	Votes	%
Republican	John Barrasso (incumbent)	73,516	89.9
Republican	Thomas Bleming	5,080	6.2
Republican	Emmett Mavy	2,873	3.5
Republican	Write-in	279	0.3
Total votes		81,748	100

U.S. Senate general election in Wyoming, 2012
Party	Candidate	Votes	%	±%
Republican	John Barrasso (incumbent)	185,250	75.66%	+2.31%
Democratic	Tim Chesnut	53,019	21.65%	−4.88%
Wyoming Country	Joel Otto	6,176	2.52%	N/A
n/a	Write-ins	417	0.17%	+0.05%
Total votes		244,862	100.0%	N/A
Republican hold				

U.S. Senate Republican primary election in Wyoming, 2018
Party	Candidate	Votes	%
Republican	John Barrasso (incumbent)	74,292	64.76%
Republican	Dave Dodson	32,647	28.46%
Republican	John Holtz	2,981	2.60%
Republican	Charlie Hardy (withdrawn)	2,377	2.07%
Republican	Roque "Rocky" De La Fuente	1,280	1.16%
Republican	Anthony Van Risseghem	870	0.7%
Write-in		267	0.23%
Total votes		114,714	100.00%

U.S. Senate general election in Wyoming, 2018
Party	Candidate	Votes	%	±%
Republican	John Barrasso (incumbent)	136,210	66.96%	−8.70%
Democratic	Gary Trauner	61,227	30.10%	+8.45%
Libertarian	Joseph Porambo	5,658	2.78%	N/A
Write-in		325	0.16%	N/A
Total votes		203,420	100.00%	N/A
Republican hold				

U.S. Senate Republican primary election in Wyoming, 2024
Party	Candidate	Votes	%
Republican	John Barrasso (incumbent)	70,494	67.92%
Republican	Reid Rasner	25,427	24.50%
Republican	John Holtz	7,868	7.58%
Total votes		103,789	100.00%

U.S. Senate general election in Wyoming, 2024
Party	Candidate	Votes	%	±%
Republican	John Barrasso (incumbent)	198,418	75.11%	+8.15%
Democratic	Scott Morrow	63,727	24.12%	−5.98%
Write-in		2,017	0.76%	+0.60%
Total votes		264,162	100.00%	N/A
Republican hold				

== See also ==
- Physicians in the United States Congress
- List of United States senators from Wyoming

Party political offices
Preceded by Craig Thomas	Republican nominee for U.S. Senator from Wyoming (Class 1); 2008, 2012, 2018, 2024	Most recent
Preceded by Lisa Murkowski	Vice Chair of the Senate Republican Conference; 2010–2012	Succeeded by Roy Blunt
Preceded by John Thune	Chair of the Senate Republican Policy Committee; 2012–2019	Succeeded by Roy Blunt
Preceded by John Thune	Chair of the Senate Republican Conference; 2025–present	Succeeded by Tom Cotton
Preceded by John Thune	Senate Republican Whip; 2025–present	Incumbent
U.S. Senate
Preceded by Craig Thomas	U.S. Senator (Class 1) from Wyoming; 2007–present Served alongside: Mike Enzi, Cynthia Lummis, Harriet Hageman (elect)	Incumbent
Preceded by Lisa Murkowski	Ranking Member of the Senate Indian Affairs Committee; 2009–2015	Succeeded by Jon Tester
Preceded by Jon Tester	Chair of the Senate Indian Affairs Committee; 2015–2017	Succeeded by John Hoeven
Preceded by Jim Inhofe	Chair of the Senate Environment Committee; 2017–2021	Succeeded by Tom Carper
Preceded by Joe Manchin	Ranking Member of the Senate Energy Committee; 2021–2025	Succeeded by Martin Heinrich
Preceded by Dick Durbin	Senate Majority Whip; 2025–present	Incumbent
Preceded by Dick Durbin	Senate Minority Whip; Taking office 2027	Designate
U.S. order of precedence (ceremonial)
Preceded by Chuck Schumer as Senate Minority Leader	Order of precedence of the United States as Senate Majority Whip	Succeeded by Dick Durbin as Senate Minority Whip
Preceded by Sheldon Whitehouse	United States senators by seniority 17th	Succeeded by Roger Wicker
