= United States House Energy Subcommittee on Health =

Subcommittee of Committee on Energy and Commerce
- Active United States House of Representatives; 119th Congress

Leadership
- Chair: Morgan Griffith (R)
- Ranking Member: Diana DeGette (D)

Structure
- Seats: 30 (30 currently filled) 17/17 13/13
- Political parties: Majority (17): Republican (17); Minority (13): Democratic (13)

Meeting place
- 2125, Rayburn House Office Building; Washington, D.C. 20515

Phone number
- (202)-225-3641

The U.S. House Committee on Energy and Commerce Subcommittee on Health is a subcommittee within the Committee on Energy and Commerce.

== Jurisdiction ==
The House Subcommittee on Health has general jurisdiction over bills and resolutions relating to public health and quarantine; hospital construction; mental health; biomedical research and development; health information technology, privacy, and cybersecurity; public health insurance (Medicare, Medicaid) and private health insurance; medical malpractice and medical malpractice insurance; the regulation of food, drugs, and cosmetics; drug abuse; the Department of Health and Human Services; the National Institutes of Health; the Centers for Disease Control; Indian Health Service; and all aspects of the above-referenced jurisdiction related to the Department of Homeland Security. As a Standing Subcommittee of the House Energy and Commerce Committee, it holds regular meetings and performs any functions assigned to it by that committee's rules in addition to those assigned to it by the House Rules.

== Members, 119th Congress ==
Majority	Minority
Morgan Griffith, Virginia, Chair; Diana Harshbarger, Tennessee, Vice Chair; Buddy Carter, Georgia; Neal Dunn, Florida; Gus Bilirakis, Florida; Dan Crenshaw, Texas; John Joyce, Pennsylvania; Troy Balderson, Ohio; Mariannette Miller-Meeks, Iowa; Jay Obernolte, California; John James, Michigan; Cliff Bentz, Oregon; Erin Houchin, Indiana; Nick Langworthy, New York; Tom Kean Jr., New Jersey; Michael Rulli, Ohio	Diana DeGette, Colorado, Ranking Member; Raul Ruiz, California; Debbie Dingell, Michigan; Robin Kelly, Illinois; Nanette Barragán, California; Kim Schrier, Washington; Lori Trahan, Massachusetts; Marc Veasey, Texas; Lizzie Fletcher, Texas; Alexandria Ocasio-Cortez, New York; Jake Auchincloss, Massachusetts; Troy Carter, Louisiana; Greg Landsman, Ohio
Ex officio
Brett Guthrie, Kentucky	Frank Pallone, New Jersey

== Historical membership rosters ==
=== 115th Congress ===
Majority	Minority
Michael C. Burgess, Texas, Chair; Brett Guthrie, Kentucky, Vice Chair; Joe Barton, Texas; Fred Upton, Michigan; John Shimkus, Illinois; Timothy F. Murphy, Pennsylvania; Marsha Blackburn, Tennessee; Cathy McMorris Rodgers, Washington; Leonard Lance, New Jersey; Morgan Griffith, Virginia; Gus Bilirakis, Florida; Billy Long, Missouri; Larry Bucshon, Indiana; Susan Brooks, Indiana; Markwayne Mullin, Oklahoma; Richard Hudson, North Carolina; Chris Collins, New York; Buddy Carter, Georgia	Gene Green, Texas, Ranking Member; Eliot Engel, New York; Jan Schakowsky, Illinois; G. K. Butterfield, North Carolina; Doris Matsui, California; Kathy Castor, Florida; John Sarbanes, Maryland; Ben Ray Luján, New Mexico; Kurt Schrader, Oregon; Joe Kennedy III, Massachusetts; Tony Cárdenas, California; Anna Eshoo, California; Diana DeGette, Colorado
Ex officio
Greg Walden, Oregon	Frank Pallone, New Jersey

=== 116th Congress ===
Majority	Minority
Anna Eshoo, California, Chair; Eliot Engel, New York; G. K. Butterfield, North Carolina; Doris Matsui, California; Kathy Castor, Florida; John Sarbanes, Maryland; Ben Ray Luján, New Mexico; Kurt Schrader, Oregon; Joe Kennedy III, Massachusetts; Tony Cárdenas, California; Peter Welch, Vermont; Raul Ruiz, California; Debbie Dingell, Michigan; Ann McLane Kuster, New Hampshire; Robin Kelly, Illinois; Nanette Barragán, California; Lisa Blunt Rochester, Delaware; Bobby Rush, Illinois	Michael C. Burgess, Texas, Ranking Member; Fred Upton, Michigan; John Shimkus, Illinois; Brett Guthrie, Kentucky; Morgan Griffith, Virginia; Gus Bilirakis, Florida; Billy Long, Missouri; Larry Bucshon, Indiana; Susan Brooks, Indiana; Markwayne Mullin, Oklahoma; Richard Hudson, North Carolina; Buddy Carter, Georgia; Greg Gianforte, Montana
Ex officio
Frank Pallone, New Jersey	Greg Walden, Oregon

=== 117th Congress ===
Majority	Minority
Anna Eshoo, California, Chair; G. K. Butterfield, North Carolina; Doris Matsui, California; Kathy Castor, Florida; John Sarbanes, Maryland, Vice Chair; Peter Welch, Vermont; Kurt Schrader, Oregon; Tony Cárdenas, California; Raul Ruiz, California; Debbie Dingell, Michigan; Ann McLane Kuster, New Hampshire; Robin Kelly, Illinois; Nanette Barragán, California; Lisa Blunt Rochester, Delaware; Angie Craig, Minnesota; Kim Schrier, Washington; Lori Trahan, Massachusetts; Lizzie Fletcher, Texas	Brett Guthrie, Kentucky, Ranking Member; Fred Upton, Michigan; Michael C. Burgess, Texas; Morgan Griffith, Virginia; Gus Bilirakis, Florida; Billy Long, Missouri; Larry Bucshon, Indiana; Markwayne Mullin, Oklahoma; Richard Hudson, North Carolina; Buddy Carter, Georgia; Neal Dunn, Florida; John Curtis, Utah; Dan Crenshaw, Texas; John Joyce, Pennsylvania
Ex officio
Frank Pallone, New Jersey	Cathy McMorris Rodgers, Washington

=== 118th Congress ===
Majority	Minority
Brett Guthrie, Kentucky, Chair; Larry Bucshon, Indiana, Vice Chair; Michael C. Burgess, Texas; Morgan Griffith, Virginia; Bob Latta, Ohio; Gus Bilirakis, Florida; Bill Johnson, Ohio; Richard Hudson, North Carolina; Buddy Carter, Georgia; Neal Dunn, Florida; Greg Pence, Indiana; Dan Crenshaw, Texas; John Joyce, Pennsylvania; Diana Harshbarger, Tennessee; Mariannette Miller-Meeks, Iowa; Jay Obernolte, California	Anna Eshoo, California, Ranking Member; John Sarbanes, Maryland; Tony Cárdenas, California; Debbie Dingell, Michigan; Ann McLane Kuster, New Hampshire; Robin Kelly, Illinois; Nanette Barragán, California; Lisa Blunt Rochester, Delaware; Angie Craig, Minnesota; Kim Schrier, Washington; Lori Trahan, Massachusetts
Ex officio
Cathy McMorris Rodgers, Washington	Frank Pallone, New Jersey
