= 2008 United States Senate special election in Wyoming =

- November 4, 2008
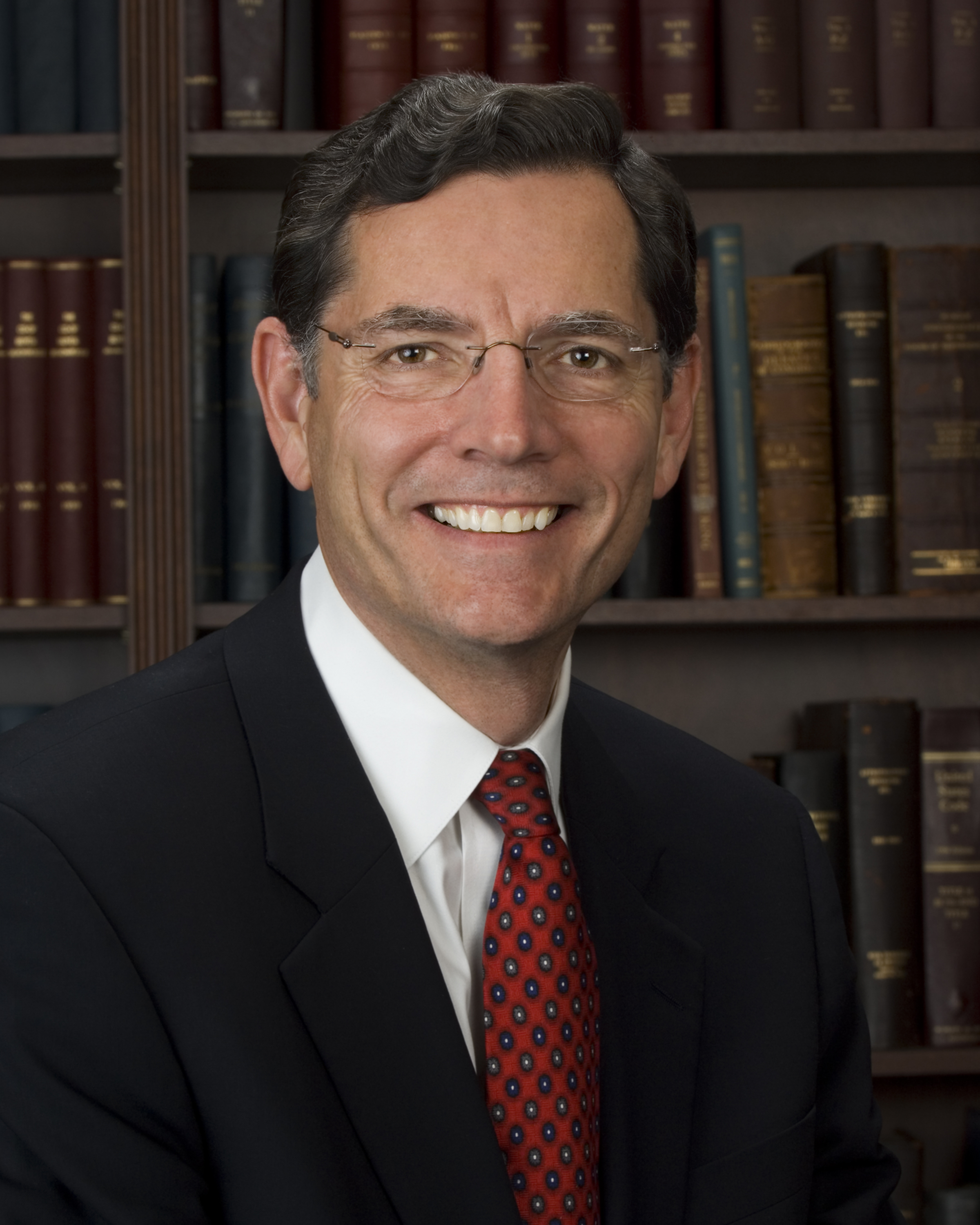

Nominee	John Barrasso	Nick Carter
Party	Republican	Democratic
Popular vote	183,063	66,202
Percentage	73.35%	26.53%
- Barrasso: 50–60% 60–70% 70–80% 80–90% >90% Carter: 50–60% 60–70% Tie: 50% No votes
U.S. senator before election
John Barrasso
Republican
Elected U.S. Senator
John Barrasso
Republican

The 2008 United States Senate special election in Wyoming was held on November 4, 2008, to elect a member of the United States Senate to represent the state of Wyoming, to complete the term of Republican three-term incumbent Craig L. Thomas who died in June 2007. Republican appointee John Barrasso defeated Democratic nominee Nick Carter.

Democratic governor Dave Freudenthal, who was obliged by state law to appoint a Republican, selected Barrasso, a state senator, who was unopposed in the Republican primary and won the general election to fill the remainder of the term ending January 3, 2013. This is the last time that both of Wyoming's U.S. Senate seats were concurrently up for election.

== Background ==
Wyoming law dictates that when a U.S. Senate seat becomes vacant, the departing senator's state party at the time of the most recent election must create a list of three finalists, with the governor to select one of those candidates to fill the seat. Speculation about potential Republican challengers had included the other finalists to succeed Thomas, Cynthia Lummis and Tom Sansonetti; as well as former state House Speaker Randall Luthi, and former U.S. Attorney Matt Mead.

== Republican primary ==
=== Candidates ===
==== Nominee ====
- John Barrasso, incumbent U.S. senator (2007–present)

==== Declined ====
- Lynne Cheney, second lady of the United States (2001–2009)

=== Results ===
Republican primary results
Party	Candidate	Votes	%
Republican	John Barrasso (incumbent)	68,194	100.00
Total votes		68,194	100.00

== Democratic primary ==
=== Candidates ===
==== Nominee ====
- Nick Carter, attorney

==== Eliminated in primary ====
- Keith Goodenough, Casper city councilman (2006–2014), and former state senator (1995–2005)

=== Results ===
Democratic primary results
Party	Candidate	Votes	%
Democratic	Nick Carter	12,316	50.67
Democratic	Keith Goodenough	11,984	49.31
Total votes		22,799	100.00

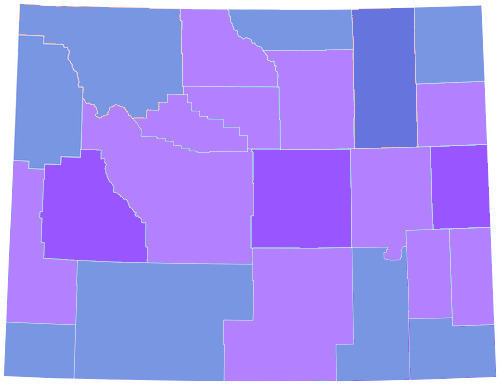
Democratic Primary results by County Carter 50–60% Carter 60–70% Goodenough 50–60% Goodenough 60–70%

== General election ==
=== Predictions ===
Source	Ranking	As of
The Cook Political Report	Safe R	October 23, 2008
CQ Politics	Safe R	October 31, 2008
Rothenberg Political Report	Safe R	November 2, 2008
Real Clear Politics	Safe R	November 4, 2008

=== Polling ===
Poll source	Date(s) administered	Sample size (Note: Key: A – all adults RV – registered voters LV – likely voters V – unclear)	Margin of error	John Barrasso (R)	Nick Carter (D)	Undecided
Research 2000 (D) (Note: Poll sponsored by Daily Kos)	October 14–16, 2008	500 (LV)	± 4.5%	57%	36%	7%
Research 2000 (D)	September 22–24, 2008	500 (LV)	± 4.5%	58%	34%	8%

=== Results ===
United States Senate special election in Wyoming, 2008
Party	Candidate	Votes	%	±%
Republican	John Barrasso (incumbent)	183,063	73.35%	+3.37%
Democratic	Nick Carter	66,202	26.53%	−3.33%
	Write-ins	293	0.12%	
Majority		116,861	46.83%	+6.70%
Turnout		249,558		
Republican hold		Swing		

== See also ==
- 2008 United States elections

== Notes ==
Partisan clients
