= 2016 United States House of Representatives election in Wyoming =

2016 United States House of Representatives election in Wyoming's at-large district
- November 8, 2016
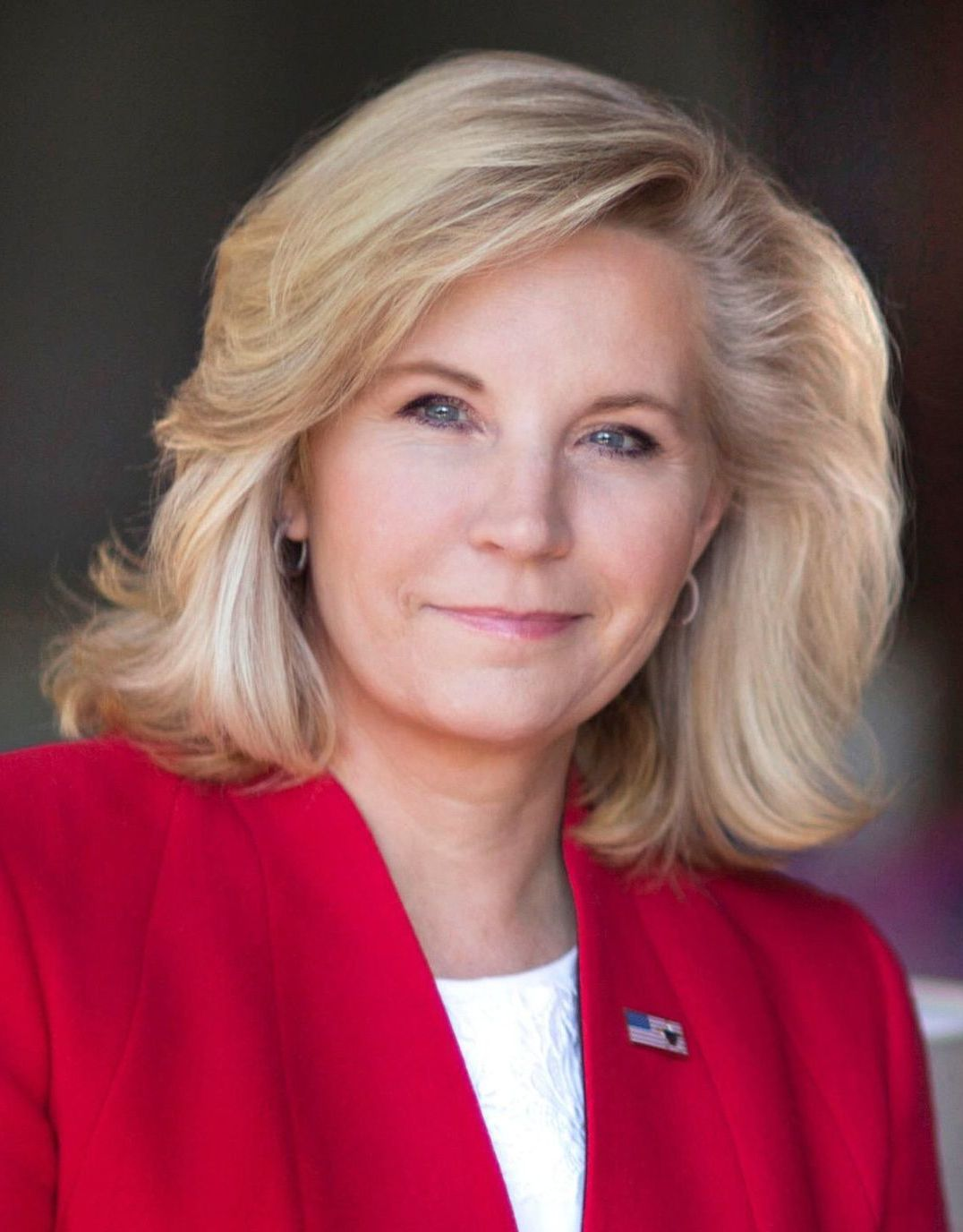

Nominee	Liz Cheney	Ryan Greene
Party	Republican	Democratic
Popular vote	156,176	75,466
Percentage	62.03%	29.97%
- Cheney: 40–50% 50–60% 60–70% 70–80% 80–90% >90% Greene: 40–50% 50–60% 60–70% 70–80% 80–90% >90% Tie: 50% No data
U.S. Representative before election
Cynthia Lummis
Republican
Elected U.S. Representative
Liz Cheney
Republican

The 2016 United States House of Representatives election in Wyoming was held on November 8, 2016, to elect the U.S. representative from Wyoming's at-large congressional district, who would represent the state of Wyoming in the 115th United States Congress. The election coincided with the 2016 U.S. presidential election, as well as other elections to the House of Representatives, elections to the United States Senate, and various state and local elections. Incumbent Republican Cynthia Lummis decided to retire instead of seeking a fifth term. Liz Cheney was elected to the seat to succeed Lummis.

The filing period for candidates lasted from May 12 to 27, 2016, and the primaries were held on August 16. Republican attorney Liz Cheney, daughter of former Vice President of the United States Dick Cheney, and Democratic energy executive Ryan Greene won their respective primaries.

== Republican primary ==
=== Candidates ===
==== Declared ====
- Heath Beaudry, banker
- Liz Cheney, attorney, daughter of former Vice President Dick Cheney, and candidate for the U.S. Senate in 2014
- Leland Christensen, state senator, former Teton County Commissioner
- Mike Konsmo, professor at Northwest College
- Paul Paad, trucking executive
- Jason Senteney, corrections officer at the Wyoming Medium Correctional Institution and candidate for this seat in 2014
- Darin Smith, attorney and Christian Broadcasting Network executive
- Tim Stubson, speaker pro tempore of the Wyoming House of Representatives

==== Withdrew ====
- Darek Farmer (running for state senate)
- Charlie Tyrrel, restaurant owner
- Rex Rammell, independent candidate for the U.S. Senate from Idaho in 2008, candidate for governor of Idaho in 2010 and candidate for the Idaho House of Representatives in 2012 (endorsed Darin Smith)

==== Declined ====
- Rosie Berger, majority leader of the Wyoming House of Representatives
- Mark Gordon, state treasurer
- Taylor Haynes, physician, write-in candidate for governor in 2010 and candidate for governor in 2014
- Cynthia Lummis, incumbent U.S. representative
- Matt Mead, governor of Wyoming
- Rita Meyer, former state auditor and candidate for governor in 2010
- Ed Murray, secretary of state of Wyoming

=== Endorsements ===
Liz Cheney

Individuals

- Alan K. Simpson, former U.S. senator from Wyoming

Organizations

- Susan B. Anthony List
Leland Christensen
- Rand Paul, U.S. senator from Kentucky and 2016 Republican presidential candidate
Darin Smith
- Rex Rammell, independent candidate for the U.S. Senate from Idaho in 2008, candidate for governor of Idaho in 2010, candidate for the Idaho House of Representatives in 2012 and former candidate for the 2016 U.S. House election in Wyoming

=== Polling ===
Poll source	Date(s) administered	Sample size	Margin of error	Liz Cheney	Leland Christensen	Darin Smith	Tim Stubson	Other	Undecided
Pulse Research	July 8–15, 2016	300	± 5.65%	21%	4%	3%	9%	–	52%

=== Results ===
Results by county: Cheney: 30–40%; 40–50%; 50–60%; Christensen: 30–40%; 50–60% }; Stubson: 30–40%

Republican primary results
Party	Candidate	Votes	%
Republican	Liz Cheney	35,043	38.78
Republican	Leland Christensen	19,330	21.39
Republican	Tim Stubson	15,524	17.18
Republican	Darin Smith	13,381	14.81
Republican	Mike Konsmo	1,363	1.51
Republican	Jason Senteney	976	1.08
Republican	Rex Rammell	890	0.98
Republican	Paul Paad	886	0.98
Republican	Heath Beaudry	534	0.59
Republican	Write-ins	155	0.17
Republican	Undervote	1,651	1.83
Republican	Overvote	625	0.69
Total votes		90,358	100.00

== Democratic primary ==
=== Candidates ===
==== Declared ====
- Ryan Greene, energy executive
- Charlie Hardy, Democratic nominee for the U.S. Senate in 2014

==== Withdrew ====
- Richard Grayson, Democratic nominee for this seat in 2014

=== Endorsements ===
Ryan Greene
- Dave Freudenthal, former governor of Wyoming
- Kathy Karpan, former secretary of state of Wyoming

=== Results ===
Results by county: Greene: 50–60%; 60–70%; 70–80%; Hardy: 50–60%

Democratic primary results
Party	Candidate	Votes	%
Democratic	Ryan Greene	10,955	53.17
Democratic	Charlie Hardy	7,868	38.18
Democratic	Write-ins	113	0.55
Democratic	Undervote	1,654	8.03
Democratic	Overvote	15	0.07
Total votes		20,605	100.00

== Third party and independent primaries ==
=== Libertarian ===
==== Candidates ====
===== Declared =====
- Lawrence Gerard Struempf

==== Results ====
Results by county: Struempf—100% Struempf—>90% Struempf—80–90% Struempf—70–80%

Libertarian primary results
Party	Candidate	Votes	%
Libertarian	Lawrence Gerard Struempf	276	81.66
Libertarian	Write-ins	30	8.88
Libertarian	Undervote	32	9.47
Total votes		338	100.00

=== Constitution ===
==== Candidates ====
===== Declared =====
- Daniel Clyde Cummings, nominee for the U.S. House in 2012 and 2014

==== Results ====
Results by county: Cummings—100% Cummings—>90% Cummings—80–90% Cummings—70–80% Write-ins—100% No Votes

Constitution primary results
Party	Candidate	Votes	%
Constitution	Daniel Clyde Cummings	133	82.10
Constitution	Write-ins	16	9.88
Constitution	Undervote	12	7.41
Constitution	Overvote	1	0.62
Total votes		162	100.00

== General election ==
=== Fundraising ===
Candidate	Raised	Spent	Cash on Hand
Liz Cheney (R)	$1,462,710	$920,180	$542,530
Ryan Greene (D)	$98,541	$93,550	$3,126
Lawrence Struempf (L)	$0	$0	$0
Daniel Clyde Cummings (C)	$0	$263	$867

=== Predictions ===
Source	Ranking	As of
The Cook Political Report	Safe R	August 10, 2016
Daily Kos	Safe R	August 17, 2016
Roll Call	Safe R	August 17, 2016
Sabato's Crystal Ball	Safe R	August 17, 2016
Rothenberg Political Report	Safe R	July 14, 2016

=== Polling ===
Poll source	Date(s) administered	Sample size	Margin of error	Liz Cheney (R)	Ryan Greene (D)	Other	Undecided
University of Wyoming	October 5–11, 2016	722	± 3.6%	53%	37%	—	—
DFM Research	September 6–11, 2016	402	± 4.9%	46%	30%	9%	16%

=== Endorsements ===
Liz Cheney

U.S. senators

- John Barrasso, Wyoming
- Mike Enzi, Wyoming

U.S. representatives

- Cynthia Lummis, Wyoming

Governors

- Matt Mead, Wyoming

Statewide officials

- Jillian Balow, Wyoming superintendent of Public Instruction
- Cynthia Cloud, Wyoming state auditor
- Mark Gordon, Wyoming state treasurer

Individuals

- Jim Geringer, former governor of Wyoming
- Randall Luthi, former speaker of the Wyoming House of Representatives
- Max Maxfield, former Wyoming secretary of state
- Rita Meyer, former Wyoming state auditor
- Alan K. Simpson, former U.S. senator from Wyoming

Organizations

- National Federation of Independent Business
- NRA Political Victory Fund
- Petroleum Association of Wyoming
- Right Now Women PAC
- Susan B. Anthony List
- Wyoming Mining Association
- Wyoming Stock Growers Association

Newspapers

- Wyoming Tribune Eagle
Ryan Greene

Individuals

- Dave Freudenthal, former governor of Wyoming
- Kathy Karpan, former Wyoming secretary of state
- Mike Sullivan, former governor of Wyoming
- Charlie Tyrrel, former Republican candidate for the U.S. House election in Wyoming in 2016

Organizations

- AFL-CIO
- United Mine Workers of America

=== Results ===
Wyoming's at-large congressional district, 2016
Party	Candidate	Votes	%	±%
Republican	Liz Cheney	156,176	62.03%	−6.44%
Democratic	Ryan Greene	75,466	29.97%	+7.07%
Constitution	Daniel Clyde Cummings	10,362	4.12%	+0.03%
Libertarian	Lawrence Gerard Struempf	9,033	3.59%	−0.72%
n/a	Write-ins	739	0.29%	+0.05%
Total votes		251,776	100.0%	N/A
Republican hold				

==== Counties that flipped from Republican to Democratic ====
- Albany (largest city: Laramie)

== See also ==
- United States House of Representatives elections, 2016
- United States elections, 2016
