= Pete Simpson =

American politician

Member of the Wyoming House of Representatives
- In office 1981–1984
- Preceded by: Victor Garber
- Succeeded by: Hardy H. Tate

Personal details
- Born: Peter Kooi Simpson; July 31, 1930 (age 96) Cody, Wyoming, U.S.
- Party: Republican
- Spouse: Lynne Alice Livingston
- Relations: Milward Simpson; Alan Simpson; Colin M. Simpson
- Children: 3
- Education: University of Wyoming; University of Oregon
- Profession: Historian; college and university administrator

Military service
- Allegiance: United States
- Branch/service: United States Navy

Peter Kooi Simpson Sr. (born July 31, 1930) is an American historian and politician who is a member of the Simpson political family of Wyoming. From 1981 to 1984, he was a member of the Wyoming House of Representatives from Sheridan, where at the time he was employed in administration by the community college, Sheridan College.

In 1986, Simpson was the Wyoming Republican gubernatorial nominee. He polled 46 percent of the vote in his race against the Democrat Michael J. Sullivan of Douglas in Converse County in southeastern Wyoming.

== Early life and education ==
A native of Cody in Park County, Wyoming, Simpson is one of two sons of the late Governor and U.S. Senator Milward L. Simpson and Lorna (née Kooi), a native of Chicago. Pete Simpson's great-grandparents, Maggie and John Simpson, platted and named Jackson, Wyoming. Another great-grandparent, Finn Burnett, knew Sacajawea and was an advisor the Shoshone chief, Washakie.

Simpson graduated in 1953 from the University of Wyoming in Laramie, where he was a member of the student senate, lettered in basketball with the UW Cowboys, and received a Bachelor of Arts, the first of his three degrees in the field of history. After four years in the United States Navy, he moved to Billings, Montana, where he starred in a local television program and became involved in folk music.

== Career ==
=== Academics ===
Simpson returned to University of Wyoming and in 1962 earned his Master of Arts degree, with his thesis, A History of the First Wyoming Legislature. He would be a member of that body some two decades thereafter.

Simpson thereafter earned his Ph.D. from the University of Oregon in Eugene, Oregon. His dissertation on the cattle industry, "The Community of Cattlemen: A Social History of the Cattle Industry in Southeastern Oregon, 1869-1912," was published as a book in 1987. He is a member of the fraternity Alpha Tau Omega. In the early 1970s, Simpson returned to Wyoming to accept a position as the assistant to the president at Casper College in Casper, the state's second largest city. He then became dean of instruction at Sheridan College.

After his legislative service ended in 1984, Simpson left Sheridan to become vice president for development at the University of Wyoming and the executive director of the UW Foundation. He resigned from UW to run for governor but returned in 1987 as vice president for development and alumni affairs. Thereafter, he was elevated to his terminal position of UW vice president for institutional advancement. After retirement in 1997, Simpson remained in Laramie and taught history on an adjunct basis at UW and was in 1999 and 2000 the Milward Simpson Distinguished Visiting Professor, named for his father.

The Simpson Fund has financed various speakers of different backgrounds and disciplines to UW, including former United States Secretary of State James A. Baker, III, former United States Secretary of the Interior James G. Watt, U.S. President Gerald R. Ford, Jr., and ABC journalist Sam Donaldson. Over the years, Simpson has emceed various UW events. In 2009, he was inducted for "Special Achievement" into the UW Athletics Hall of Fame.

While at UW, Simpson and his brother, Alan, were invited to team teach for one semester only by the political science department, but Pete Simpson was still teaching the course twelve years later. After he left the U.S. Senate, Alan Simpson became a lecturer for several years for the Institute of Politics at the Kennedy School of Government at Harvard University, but he returned to Cody in 2000 to practice law with his two sons, Colin and William Simpson.

Long involved in civic affairs, Pete Simpson in 2010 joined his former gubernatorial rival, Mike Sullivan, at a fundraising appearance in Rock Springs in southwestern Wyoming for the benefit of the library in Sweetwater County.

Pete Simpson narrated the hour-long documentary Over Wyoming which was produced by WyomingPBS in 2016.

=== Politics ===
During his four-year stint in the legislature, Simpson was a member of the House Appropriations Committee. Two years after leaving the state House, he waged a hard-fought race for governor but fell short. UW history professor Phil Roberts suggested that the principal reason that Pete Simpson may have lost that race to Mike Sullivan was that Alan Simpson was already serving in his second term in the U.S. Senate: "There are a number of people that speculate because there already was a Simpson in the Senate, they probably wanted just one Simpson at a time."

Roberts said that family names have been less important in Wyoming politics than in other states with prominent political families. That view held true when, in 2014, when Liz Cheney, daughter of former U.S. Vice President Dick Cheney, challenged Alan Simpson's Senate successor, Mike Enzi in the Republican primary. Enzi won the election.

== Personal life ==
Simpson and his brother, former state representative and U.S. Senator Alan K. Simpson, both carried their mother's maiden name as their middle name. Pete Simpson is an uncle of former State Representative Colin M. Simpson of Cody, who ran unsuccessfully for governor in the Republican primary election held on August 17, 2010. The nomination and the general election on November 2 went to Matt Mead, a member of another Wyoming Republican political family, the Hansens, referring to former Governor and former U.S. Senator Clifford Hansen. Colin Simpson was Wyoming House Speaker in his last term from 2009 to 2010.

Simpson and his wife, the former Lynne Alice Livingston left Laramie around 2011 to return to Cody. Their younger son, Peter K. Simpson, Jr. is an Obie Award- winning actor and long time performer, writer, director and trainer for Blue Man Group. In 2010, he appeared at UW as Prince Hamlet in a theatre production of the Shakespearean play, with Pete Simpson cast as the Ghost of Hamlet's father. The junior Simpson recalls, with "the ghost and son scene, ... I could feel an energy shift in the room. It was hard not to get misty eyed."

The older son, Milward Allen Simpson (born 1962), is the director of the Wyoming Department of State Parks and Cultural Resources, first under Democratic Governor Dave Freudenthal and under former Republican Governor Matt Mead. This Milward Simpson had been mentioned as a potential Democratic candidate for governor at the same time that his cousin, Colin Simpson, sought the Republican nomination against Matt Mead for the office that the Simpsons' paternal grandfather held from 1955 to 1959, before both had been born.

Milward Allen Simpson said that his political values as a Democrat are identical to those that his grandfather "instilled in us -– is that it's important to be who you are and stand up for what you believe in, and be honest and truthful. ... It doesn't really matter what your party stripe is, if you love the state and you want to serve it, that's what you've got to do. ... Blood's much thicker than partisan politics."

The middle child is daughter, Margaret Ann Simpson-Crabaugh who is an actress, singer/songwriter and teaches Enneagram workshops.

In 2011, the UW Alumni Association honored Pete Simpson with its Medallion Service Award, first issued in 1968 but not given annually. It recognizes outstanding dedication and service to the university.

In June 2012, still involved in occasional acting, Simpson played the celebrated frontiersman William F. Cody at the opening of the redesigned Cody museum at the Buffalo Bill Historical Center in Cody.

The Peter K. Simpson papers from 1977 to 2009, the majority from his political career from 1980 to 1987, are located in the UW archives in Laramie.

Political offices
Preceded by Victor Garber	Wyoming State Representative from District 24 (Sheridan County); 1981-1984	Succeeded by Hardy H. Tate
Party political offices
Preceded by Warren A. Morton	Wyoming Republican gubernatorial nominee 1986	Succeeded by Mary Mead
