= Ron Micheli =

American politician

Joseph Ronald "Ron" Micheli

Wyoming State Representative from Uinta County
- In office January 1, 1977 – December 31, 1992

Director, Wyoming Department of Agriculture
- In office 1995–2003

Personal details
- Born: May 30, 1948 (age 78) Uinta County, Wyoming
- Party: Republican
- Spouse: Patricia J. "Patty" Smith Micheli
- Children: 8 children
- Education: University of Wyoming
- Profession: Rancher

Joseph Ronald Micheli, known as Ron Micheli (born May 30, 1948), is a former director of the Wyoming Department of Agriculture who also served from 1977 to 1992 in the Wyoming House of Representatives. He ran a strong third-place finish as a candidate for the Republican gubernatorial nomination in 2010. His primary opponents were former U.S. Attorney Matt Mead, who won the nomination and later the general election, state auditor Rita Meyer, who placed second less than a percentage point behind Mead, and Speaker of the Wyoming House Colin M. Simpson of Cody, who finished in fourth place.

== Personal life ==
Ron Micheli was born in Fort Bridger in Uinta County in the southwestern corner of Wyoming to Joseph G. Micheli (born 1927) and Rebecca T. Micheli (born 1925). In 1966, he graduated from Mountain View High School. In 1970, he received a Bachelor of Science degree in animal science from the University of Wyoming at Laramie. He was voted the "Outstanding Animal Science Student" by the agriculture honorary fraternity Alpha Zeta. Micheli has also been recognized as an "Outstanding Alumnus" of the University of Wyoming College of Agriculture.

On June 13, 1969, Micheli, a member of the Church of Jesus Christ of Latter-day Saints, married the former Patricia J. "Patty" Smith (born 1949), a 1967 graduate of Hot Springs County High School in Thermopolis and a 1971 graduate of the University of Wyoming. The couple has eight children, all of whom have attended the University of Wyoming. As of 2010, five of the Micheli offspring had received their UW degrees.

== Business background ==
Micheli is a fourth generation rancher in Fort Bridger, where he runs and operates a ranch in partnership with his brother, Dale Dee Micheli (born 1954). The ranch maintains a purebred Hereford and Angus cattle operation with an annual bull sale each year in October. Ron Micheli is a former Regional Vice President of the Wyoming Stock Growers Association and has received the "Guardian of the Grassland Award," the highest honor of the association. In 1991, Gamma Sigma Delta named Micheli as Wyoming's "Outstanding Agriculturalist." In 1997, Wyoming Livestock Roundup named Micheli the "Outstanding Agriculture Citizen for the State of Wyoming". The Wyoming Association of Conservation Districts awarded Micheli their Presidential Award, the highest honor given by that organization. Micheli received the "Compadre Award" from the interest group, the Wyoming Wool Growers Association, which recognizes achievement on behalf of the state's sheep industry.

== Political career ==
In 2007, after the death of U.S. Senator Craig L. Thomas, the Wyoming Republican Party held a special election to choose three candidates to submit to the Wyoming Governor so the Governor could choose Senator Thomas's replacement. Micheli participated in the special election process and advanced to the final round of five candidates. Ultimately, Democratic Governor Dave Freudenthal tapped John Barrasso, a Casper physician, for the appointment.

Before running for the United States Senate, Micheli served in the Wyoming House of Representatives. During his time in the House, Micheli held various leadership positions including Majority Whip, Majority Floor Leader, and Speaker Pro Tem. Micheli served as the chairman of the House Revenue Committee for six years where he was recognized as the tax authority in the House. Micheli drafted and carried major revisions to the Wyoming Tax Code including legislation to ensure that agriculture lands were taxed according to their productive value. Micheli also drafted and successfully shepherded a constitutional amendment to clarify property taxation under Wyoming law.

On social issues, Micheli supported legislation to require parental consent before a minor could procure an abortion, and he sponsored and successfully enacted legislation to prevent the use of public funds for abortions except in the case of rape, incest or danger to the life of the mother. Micheli also sponsored and carried the Victims Bill of Rights, sweeping legislation to protect victims of crimes.

During his time in the Wyoming House, the media covering the legislature named Micheli as the most outstanding legislator.

Micheli also served on the House Agriculture Committee, House Health and Human Services Committee, Mines and Minerals Committee, among others.

Micheli has served as a Republican precinct committeeman for twenty-two years and on the Wyoming Republican State Central Committee for twelve years, including a stint as treasurer. Micheli served as the chairman of the Wyoming State Republican Convention in 1994 and twice headed the Platform committee, most recently in 2008. In 2012, Micheli served as an Elector for Mitt Romney and Paul Ryan.

== Wyoming Director of Agriculture ==
Micheli served as the Director of the Wyoming Department of Agriculture from 1995 to 2003. During his time as the director of this state agency, Micheli served on several national boards including serving as President of the Western Association of State Departments of Agriculture (WASDA) where Micheli presided over an organization which included twelve western state departments of agriculture. As president of WASDA, Micheli helped to develop joint policy and positions with all twelve state agricultural departments to address concerns of the coalition.

During his time as Director of Agriculture, Micheli worked extensively with various environmental and regulatory issues. Micheli also served as the chairman of the National Task Force on Clean Water Act Compliance. In this position, Micheli led a national task force to reduce the impact of implementing Total Maximum Daily Load (TMDL) standards under the Clean Water Act. This task force worked with state and federal agencies to reach a compromise agreement on standards and enforcement that would protect waters and protect private industry and agriculture. Micheli represented Wyoming in the Western States Governors Association initiative to overhaul the Endangered Species Act. As the Wyoming representative on this task force, Micheli worked closely with members of Congress to craft legislation to amend the Endangered Species Act. As the co-chair of the Wyoming Animal Damage Management Board, Micheli represented Wyoming in congressional hearings related to predator control. Micheli also represented Wyoming before federal agencies on issues related to the implementation of the Endangered Species Act, the authorization of the Farm Bill, and public land use issues.

Micheli also led several state interagency tasks force to address issues facing Wyoming. Micheli served as the chair of the Wyoming Interagency Brucellosis management team, having led an interagency task force to address brucellosis infection in bison and elk in the Greater Yellowstone National Park area that had caused several states to place an embargo on Wyoming cattle. This task force successfully worked to end the embargo and allow the exportation of Wyoming cattle to every state. Micheli also served as the co-chair of the Governor's Drought Task Force.
