= Paul Gosar =

American politician (born 1958)

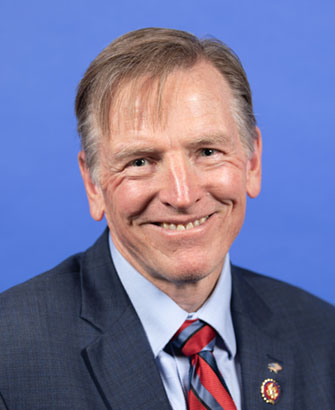
- Official portrait, 2022

Member of the U.S. House of Representatives from Arizona
- Incumbent
- Assumed office January 3, 2011
- Preceded by: Ann Kirkpatrick
- Constituency: 1st district (2011–2013); 4th district (2013–2023); 9th district (2023–present)

Personal details
- Born: Paul Anthony Gosar; November 27, 1958 (age 67) Rock Springs, Wyoming, U.S.
- Party: Republican
- Spouse: Maude Connor (m. 1988)
- Children: 3
- Relatives: Pete Gosar (brother)
- Education: Creighton University (BS, DDS)
- Website: House website Campaign website
- Gosar's voice Gosar supporting the La Paz County Land Conveyance Act; Recorded July 23, 2018

Paul Anthony Gosar (/ˈɡoʊsɑːr/ GOH-sar; born November 27, 1958) is an American politician and former dentist serving in the U.S. House of Representatives since 2011. Representing Arizona's 9th congressional district since 2023, he previously represented the 4th district (2013–2023) and the 1st district (2011–2013). He is a member of the Republican Party.

Gosar was first elected to Congress in 2010. He has been described by some media outlets as a far-right Republican and has drawn controversy over statements associated with conspiracy theories and reported ties to far-right groups. A supporter of President Donald Trump, Gosar voted to challenge the certification of the 2020 U.S. presidential election.

In November 2021, Gosar was formally censured by the U.S. House of Representatives and stripped of his committee assignments on a largely party-line vote after posting an edited Attack on Titan video depicting a character with his likeness in stylized combat with figures resembling Alexandria Ocasio-Cortez and Joe Biden. After Republicans regained the House majority in 2022, Gosar was reinstated to his committee assignments.

Gosar and David Schweikert have shared the deanship of Arizona's congressional delegation since the death of Raúl Grijalva on March 13, 2025. Gosar is expected to become the dean of the Arizona delegation by January 2027, as Schweikert is retiring to run for governor in 2026.

== Early life and education ==
Gosar was born in Rock Springs, Wyoming, on November 27, 1958, the son of Antone J. Gosar (1930–2021) and Bernadette Gosar (née Erramouspe, 1933–2025). He is the eldest of seven sons and three daughters. His paternal grandparents were Slovenian, and his maternal grandparents were Basque immigrants from Banca, on the French side of the Franco–Spanish border. Gosar was raised in Pinedale, Wyoming, and graduated from Pinedale High School in 1977. His parents have been described as devoted Republicans who attended the national conventions for former presidents Richard M. Nixon and Gerald Ford. Gosar's brother Pete is a former chairman of the Wyoming Democratic Party and was a candidate for governor of Wyoming in 2010 and 2014.

In 1981, Gosar received his B.S. degree from Creighton University in Omaha, Nebraska. In 1985, he earned his D.D.S. from the Boyne School of Dentistry at Creighton.

== Early career ==
From 1989 to 2010, Gosar had a dentistry practice in Flagstaff, Arizona. In 2001, Gosar was the Arizona Dental Association's (AzDA) "Dentist of the Year". He was inducted into the AzDA Hall of Fame and served as its president from 2004 to 2005. Gosar was also president of the Northern Arizona Dental Society and vice-chair of the AzDA council on governmental affairs.

== U.S. House of Representatives ==
=== Elections ===
==== 2010 ====
In 2009, Gosar, who had never run for elected office before, announced that he would challenge Democratic incumbent Ann Kirkpatrick in the 1st district in the 2010 elections. He was identified as a Tea Party candidate by The New York Times because the Arizona Tea Party featured him on its website.

Gosar won the Republican primary. He was endorsed by former Alaska governor Sarah Palin and three Arizona county sheriffs: Maricopa County's Joe Arpaio, Coconino County's Joe Richards, and Pinal County's Paul Babeu. Kirkpatrick challenged him to five debates across the district. Gosar initially agreed to one debate but later withdrew. He released a statement explaining that his decision to withdraw from the debate was based on the long drive to and from the television station, KAET in Phoenix, which had organized the debate, but a producer at KAET said that Gosar's staff had told the station that the candidate could not participate in the debate because he would be attending a fundraiser instead.

Gosar defeated Kirkpatrick in the November 2010 general election, taking 49.7% of the vote.

==== 2012 ====
Gosar initially planned to seek reelection in the 1st district, which had been made less favorable to Republicans as a result of redistricting, but with Kirkpatrick priming for a rematch, he changed his mind and announced in January 2012 that he would run in the newly created 4th district. The 4th had absorbed much of the western portion of the old 1st district and was heavily Republican. Gosar rented an apartment in Prescott, the largest city in the 4th, which he claimed as his official residence. While members of the House are only constitutionally required to live in the state that they represent, longstanding convention calls for them to live in or reasonably close to the district they represent. Gosar claimed that he eventually would buy a home in the 4th. Despite this, he still claimed his home in Flagstaff as his primary residence; he long received tax breaks on his Flagstaff home due to this status. While he was registered to vote in Yavapai County, home to Prescott, his wife was registered to vote in Coconino County, home to Flagstaff.

Gosar initially faced a tough primary fight against Babeu, but Babeu pulled out in May 2012 owing to allegations of abuse of power. Gosar defeated former state senator Ron Gould and businessman Rick Murphy in the Republican primary, all but assuring him a second term in Congress. In the November general election, he defeated Democratic challenger Johnnie Robinson with 67% of the vote.

==== 2014 ====
Gosar easily won reelection, winning 70% of the vote against Democratic nominee Mikel Weisser in the 2014 midterm elections.

==== 2016 ====
Gosar faced Weisser again in 2016. Weisser attempted to use Gosar's support of then-nominee Donald Trump and the recent Access Hollywood tape against him in campaign ads. Gosar was reelected with 71% of the vote.

==== 2018 ====
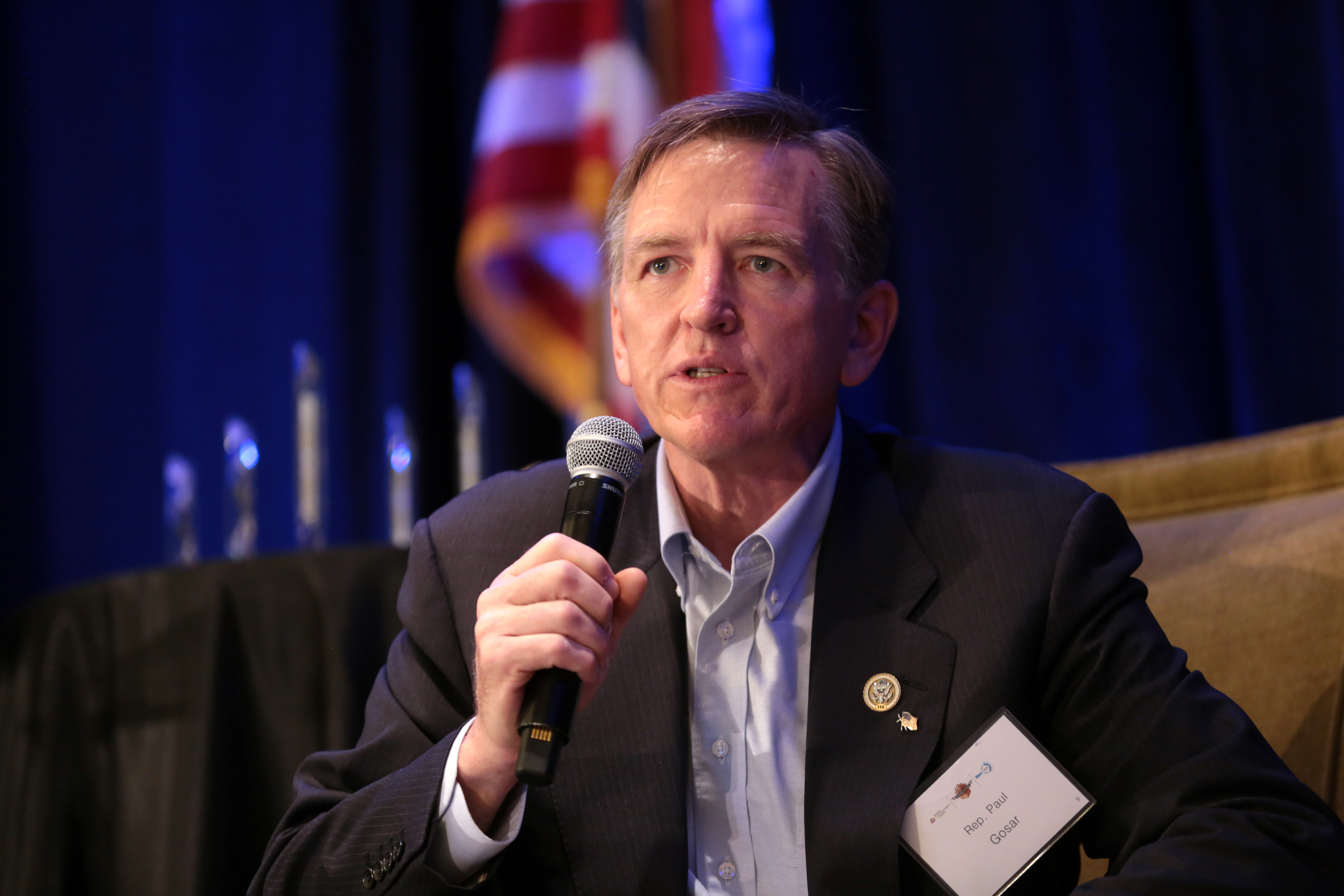
Gosar speaking at the 2018 Arizona Manufacturing Summit in Phoenix, Arizona

In September 2018, six of Gosar's nine siblings spoke out against their brother and endorsed his Democratic opponent, David Brill, in a series of television campaign ads that drew national and international coverage. In the first ad, sisters Grace and Jennifer, both identified as health-care providers, told viewers that their brother did not care about people in rural Arizona. In another ad, called "A family defends its honor," brother David Gosar, a lawyer, declared, "We've got to stand up for our good name. This is not who we are." Paul Gosar responded to the ads on Twitter, describing his siblings as "disgruntled Hillary supporters" who "put political ideology before family".

Gosar defeated Brill in the November 2018 general election with 68.2% of the vote.

==== 2020 ====
Gosar was reelected with 69.7% of the vote over Democratic nominee Delina DiSanto. Six of his nine siblings—Grace, Jennifer, Joan, Gaston, David and Tim—endorsed his opponent, as they had in 2018.

==== 2022 ====
In 2021, Gosar announced that he would run for reelection in Arizona's 9th congressional district after redistricting. The redrawn 9th was essentially the successor to the old 4th. Since Prescott was drawn into the new 2nd district (the old 1st), Gosar claimed a condominium in Bullhead City as his residence in the district, though public records still showed he owned a home in Flagstaff. It was no less Republican than its predecessor, and Gosar was re-elected unopposed.

==== 2024 ====
Gosar was reelected with 65.3% of the vote over Democratic nominee Quacy Smith.

==== 2026 ====
Gosar was reelected with 57.4% of the vote over Democratic nominee Danielle Sterbinsky. This was Gosar's closest margin of victory (14.8%) since his election to the U.S. House in 2010, that being 6.0%. It was also the closest margin of victory for the district since Krysten Sinema won her first term to the U.S. House in 2012 by 4.1%.

=== Actions ===
In January 2016, Gosar wrote and proposed legislation to strip Bill Cosby of his Presidential Medal of Freedom after Cosby admitted to drugging women. His proposal received the support of Angela Rose and her nonprofit organization, with which Gosar consulted when writing the bill; President Barack Obama stated he would "take a look" at the proposal, but it did not pass.

On January 6, 2020, with the caption "The world is a better place without these guys in power", Gosar tweeted a doctored photograph showing Obama meeting Iranian President Hassan Rouhani. The encounter never happened; the picture was a photoshopped version of one showing Obama meeting former Indian prime minister Manmohan Singh. The photojournalist Daniel Medina pointed out that Rouhani was still in power and condemned Gosar's attempt to spread disinformation. The photoshopped image was also featured in a 2015 TV ad for Senator Ron Johnson. To widespread criticism, Gosar said, "No one said this wasn't photoshopped."

In June 2021, fliers were circulated online for a fundraiser featuring Gosar and white nationalist Nick Fuentes; while at first appearing to defend the event, Gosar ultimately denied that he had planned to attend it.

==== Attendance of America First Political Action Conference ====
On February 26, 2021, Gosar delivered the keynote speech at the America First Political Action Conference hosted by white nationalist and antisemite Nick Fuentes, who had previously supported the 2021 United States Capitol attack, defended racial segregation, and denied aspects of the Holocaust. Gosar was joined at the event by former Representative Steve King of Iowa, who was taken off his congressional committee seats after defending white nationalism in 2019. Gosar later distanced himself from Fuentes, telling a panel at the Conservative Political Action Conference (CPAC) that racism and violence are unacceptable, criticizing "white racism" and saying, "there's no room for violence." Nevertheless, he defended his presence at the conference, saying, "There is a group of young people that are becoming part of the election process, and becoming a bigger force. So why not take that energy and listen to what they've got to say?... You don't accomplish anything by isolating and refusing to speak to some audiences." Liz Cheney criticized Gosar's attendance at the event, saying, "This is not the kind of an organization or an event that other members of Congress should be participating in".

CNN also reported that, before CPAC, Gosar and a dozen other Republican House members skipped votes and enlisted others to vote for them in order to attend the event, which was held at the same time as their absences. They cited the ongoing COVID-19 pandemic as the reason for their absences. In response, the Campaign for Accountability, an ethics watchdog group, filed a complaint with the House Committee on Ethics and requested an investigation into Gosar and the other lawmakers.

==== 2021 censure ====
In November 2021, Gosar posted a video on social media that parodied the title sequence of the anime series Attack on Titan that had been edited with the faces of himself, Representative Alexandria Ocasio-Cortez, and Joe Biden superimposed on the show's characters, depicting Gosar killing Ocasio-Cortez and attacking Biden with swords. In posting the video, Gosar inquired: "Any anime fans out there?" Gosar insisted that the video "wasn't a threat and is meant to be 'entertaining'".

Speaker Nancy Pelosi called for the House Ethics Committee and law enforcement to investigate it as a threat. On November 17, 2021, Gosar was censured for the post and removed from committee assignments by a 223–207 vote, making him the 24th House member to be censured in American history. The vote was mainly along party lines; only two Republicans, Liz Cheney and Adam Kinzinger, voted with the Democrats, while "about a dozen Republicans stood beside Gosar in a show of support," according to The Washington Post. (One Republican, David P. Joyce, voted present.) Minutes after being censured, he retweeted the offending video again. The next day, Trump endorsed Gosar for his 2022 reelection bid, while House Republican leader Kevin McCarthy said he would likely give Gosar better committee assignments if Republicans won the House in 2022.

==== 2022 ====
In February 2022, Senate Minority Leader Mitch McConnell criticized Gosar for participating in the America First Political Action Conference, organized by white nationalist and Holocaust denier Nick Fuentes, saying there was no place in the Republican Party for "white supremacists or anti-Semitism".

On May 24, 2022, the day of the Robb Elementary School shooting, Gosar spread misinformation about the attack, tweeting that the perpetrator was "a transsexual leftist illegal alien named Salvatore Ramos." He shared a 4chan post containing photographs of a transgender woman who had nothing to do with the attack. He deleted the tweet after about two hours. The woman in the post was a transgender artist who posted on Reddit: "It's not me, I don't even live in Texas. They are my pics. People are using [them] to make trans people look like murderers and blaming me for the shooting." In response to Gosar's tweet, The Arizona Republic's Laurie Roberts wrote: "Rep. Paul Gosar has once again shown himself completely unfit for office. The congressman is nothing more than a gossip, and a dangerous one at that."

==== 2023 ====
In an email published on his congressional website in September 2023, Gosar described U.S. Army general Mark Milley as a "quisling" and "sodomy-promoting", adding that "in a better society [...] General Milley would be hung".

=== Committee assignments ===
For the 118th Congress:

- Committee on Natural Resources
  - Subcommittee on Energy and Mineral Resources
  - Subcommittee on Oversight and Investigations (Chair)
- Committee on Oversight and Accountability
  - Subcommittee on Health Care and Financial Services
  - Subcommittee on National Security, the Border, and Foreign Affairs

=== Caucus memberships ===
- Republican Study Committee
- Congressional Motorcycle Caucus
- Congressional Western Caucus (chair)
- Congressional Interstate 11 Caucus (co-chair)
- Congressional Solar Caucus
- Congressional Inventions Caucus (co-chair)
- Freedom Caucus
- Congressional Constitution Caucus
- U.S.-Japan Caucus
- Second Amendment Caucus
- Congressional Caucus on Turkey and Turkish Americans
- Congressional Taiwan Caucus

== Attempts to overturn the 2020 presidential election ==
=== "Stop the Steal" ===
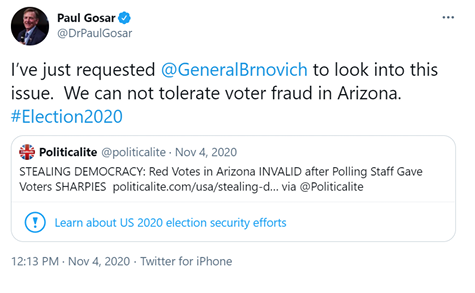
A November 2020 tweet from Gosar, suggesting that Arizona attorney general Mark Brnovich should investigate false claims of voter fraud following the 2020 U.S. presidential election

Several weeks after the 2020 presidential election, Gosar was one of 27 Republican members of Congress to request that U.S. Attorney General William Barr "appoint a Special Counsel to investigate irregularities in the 2020 election." The Arizona Republican Party produced a video, featuring Gosar and Representative Andy Biggs, falsely claiming that there was widespread voter fraud in the election. Gosar falsely claimed that Arizona's voting machines were faulty, that Wisconsin intentionally paused counting votes to "dump" 100,000 votes into the count for Joe Biden, and that dead people voted in Pennsylvania. He and Biggs also demanded an audit of Maricopa County's vote count. Gosar strongly objected to counting electoral votes for Biden from certain states.

Through November, Gosar participated in Stop the Steal protests, comparing their efforts to the Battle of the Alamo. Later, he tweeted a comparison between the fight for the America First agenda and that of Teruo Nakamura of the Imperial Japanese Army; Nakamura refused to acknowledge the news of Japan's surrender in World War II for three decades and remained alone on the remote island of Morotai until his discovery in 1974.

Gosar repeatedly spoke at Stop the Steal events, claiming without basis that then-President-elect Joe Biden was an "illegitimate usurper" and that Trump was the victim of an attempted coup.

=== Involvement in the 2021 United States Capitol attack ===
In December after the election, right-wing political activist and organizer Ali Alexander said that he, Gosar, Biggs, and Representative Mo Brooks were "planning something big": a "mob" to pressure Congress into rejecting the election results. In a since-deleted video, Alexander said: "We four schemed up of putting maximum pressure on Congress while they were voting." Gosar's office did not respond to media inquiries about this allegation. News outlets noted that, in the past, Gosar's social media accounts had expressed support for Alexander.

In the joint session of Congress to formally count the votes of the Electoral College on January 6, 2021, Gosar and Senator Ted Cruz led a challenge to Arizona's electoral results.

The electoral count was disrupted when a mob of Trump supporters attacked the Capitol, resulting in the death of one police officer and four protesters. Gosar was the first member of Congress to advance the false conspiracy theory that antifa was to blame for the violence, echoed by Brooks and Representative Matt Gaetz. When Congress reconvened that night, the challenge to the Arizona vote had been rejected 6-93 in the Senate and 121-303 in the House. Of Arizona's congressional representatives, Representatives Gosar, Biggs, and Debbie Lesko voted to reject Arizona's vote results.

As a result of Gosar's alleged involvement in the storming of the Capitol, three of his siblings called for his expulsion from Congress. "When you talk about what happened the other day, you're talking about treason. You're talking about overthrowing the government. That's what this is. If that doesn't rise to the level of expulsion, what does?" said Tim Gosar. On January 19, the last day of the Trump administration, it was reported that Gosar and Biggs sought pardons from Trump. No pardons were granted to them or anyone else involved in the storming of the Capitol or the preceding "Save America" rally.

In June 2021, Gosar was one of 21 House Republicans to vote against a resolution to give the Congressional Gold Medal to police officers who defended the U.S. Capitol on January 6.

== Political positions ==
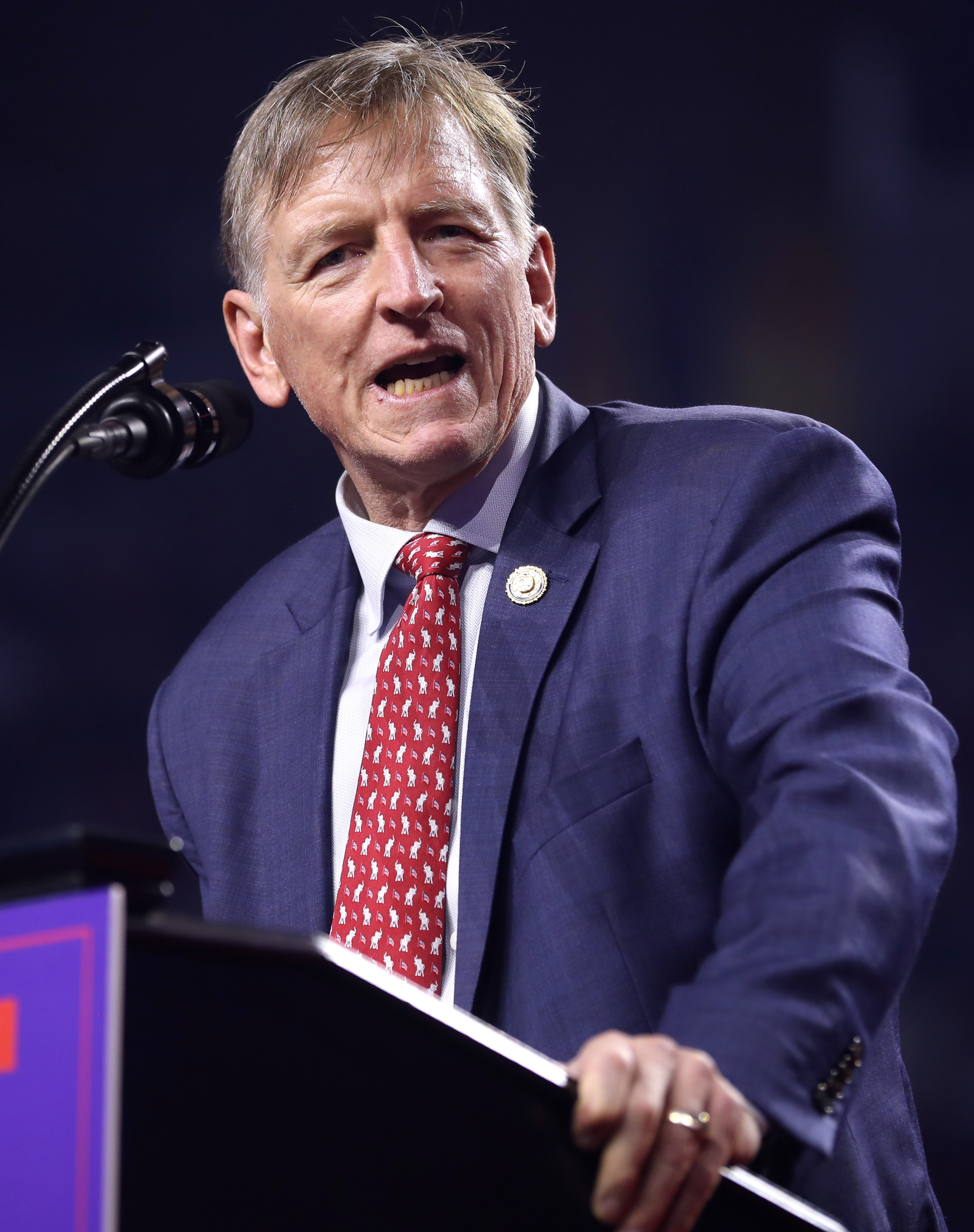
Gosar at a Donald Trump rally during the 2024 United States presidential election at Desert Diamond Arena in Glendale, Arizona

Multiple sources have described Gosar as a proponent of far-right politics. During Donald Trump's presidency, Gosar voted in line with the president's stated position 86.1% of the time. During Joe Biden's presidency, he voted in line with the president's stated position 3.7% of the time (as of May 25, 2022).

=== Abortion ===
Gosar describes himself as pro-life. He cosponsored the No Taxpayer Funding for Abortion Act, a bill that would make permanent restrictions on federal funding of abortions in the US, and the District of Columbia Pain-Capable Unborn Child Protection Act, an act placing restrictions on abortions in the District of Columbia. Gosar was given a 100% rating by the National Right to Life Committee, an anti-abortion interest group, and a 0% rating by NARAL (National Abortion and Reproductive Rights Action League), an abortion rights interest group. He supported the 2022 overturning of Roe v. Wade, calling it "amazing and historic" and thanking Donald Trump "for making this possible."

=== LGBT rights ===
Gosar is opposed to the expansion of LGBT rights. In December 2022, Gosar voted against the Respect for Marriage Act, which codified same-sex and interracial marriage rights into federal law, along with all Arizona Republicans. In 2023, he wrote in his weekly official newsletter to his constituents an essay opposing General Milley, the Chairman of the Joint Chiefs of Staff whom he called a "traitor," saying, "In a better society, quislings like the strange sodomy-promoting General Milley would be hung."

=== Boycott of Pope Francis ===
On September 17, 2015, in an op-ed on the conservative website Townhall, Gosar announced that he would not attend Pope Francis's planned address to a joint meeting of Congress unless Francis spoke about issues such as "violent Islam" or Planned Parenthood instead of climate change. He wrote that he would treat Francis the same way he believes "leftist politicians" should be treated. Gosar said that Francis "adopted all of the socialist talking points, wrapped false science and ideology into 'climate justice' and is being presented to guilt people into leftist policies." He called climate science "questionable" and criticized Laudato si', Francis's encyclical on the environment.

Gosar did not attend Francis's September 24 address, the only member of Congress not to do so. Shortly after Francis's visit, Gosar used his opposition to his address as a fundraising tool. A fundraising email for Gosar used his Townhall.com op-ed's catchphrase, "When the Pope chooses to act and talk like a leftist politician, then he can expect to be treated like one" and positioned Gosar as the victim of "unprecedented attacks" from "the liberals, the left-wing media and the Obama political machine."

=== Economy ===
Gosar voted for the Tax Cuts and Jobs Act of 2017. He was criticized for touting funding for Kingman Airport in the Infrastructure Investment and Jobs Act while neglecting to mention that he voted against the final bill.

Gosar was among the 71 Republicans who voted against final passage of the Fiscal Responsibility Act of 2023 in the House. In June 2020, Gosar introduced a bill that, if passed, would force the Federal Reserve to restart issuance of $500 bills and adopt a new design that would feature former President Donald Trump in its portrait.

=== Environment ===
In 2015, Gosar scored 3% on the National Environmental Scorecard of the League of Conservation Voters, in part because he is a global warming denier. On January 30, 2017, he introduced House Joint resolution 46, which would repeal the authority of the National Park Service to decline private drilling for oil, gas and minerals in 40 U.S. National Parks if the Park Service determines that the mining operation would threaten the environment. The Washington Post said Gosar was "no friend of environmentalists."

In September 2015, Gosar submitted articles of impeachment against EPA administrator Gina McCarthy, asserting that she had committed "high crimes and misdemeanors" and "lied to the American people in order to force misguided and overreaching regulations, which have no scientific basis, down our throats." An EPA spokeswoman said Gosar's resolution "has zero merit and is nothing more than political theater", while fellow Republican and House majority leader Kevin McCarthy confirmed that "There's no plan to impeach Gina McCarthy."

Gosar supports dismantling the Endangered Species Act, calling it "status quo" and "costly, burdensome and uncertain."

=== Foreign policy ===
In 2019, Gosar co-signed a letter from Representative Ro Khanna and Senator Rand Paul to Trump asserting that it is "long past time to rein in the use of force that goes beyond congressional authorization" and that they hoped this would "serve as a model for ending hostilities in the future—in particular, as you and your administration seek a political solution to our involvement in Afghanistan."

In 2019, Gosar was one of 60 representatives to vote against condemning Trump's withdrawal from Syria.

In 2020, Gosar voted against the National Defense Authorization Act of 2021, which would prevent the president from withdrawing soldiers from Afghanistan without congressional approval.

In June 2020, Gosar expressed support for Morocco's position on the Western Sahara conflict, and encouraged the Trump administration to support this position.

In 2021, when the House overwhelmingly passed a measure condemning the Myanmar coup d'état, Gosar voted present, while 14 other House Republicans voted against it.

In June 2021, Gosar was one of 49 House Republicans to vote to repeal the 2002 Congressional authorization of the Iraq War.

In September 2021, Gosar was among 75 House Republicans to vote against the National Defense Authorization Act of 2022, which contains a provision that would require women to be drafted.

Gosar was among 19 House Republicans to vote against the final passage of the 2022 National Defense Authorization Act.

In February 2022, Gosar co-sponsored the Secure America's Borders First Act, which would prohibit the expenditure or obligation of military and security assistance to Kyiv over the U.S. border with Mexico.

In October 2022, Gosar invited Ukrainian President Volodymyr Zelenskyy and Russian President Vladimir Putin to Arizona for peace talks over the Russo-Ukrainian war.

In 2023, Gosar was among 47 Republicans to vote in favor of H.Con.Res. 21 which directed President Joe Biden to remove U.S. troops from Syria within 180 days.

Gosar voted to support Israel following the 2023 Hamas attack on Israel.

=== Gun rights ===
Gosar has stated that the "Second Amendment is one of the most important rights set forth by the Bill of Rights" and that he will "continue to oppose efforts to restrict, infringe, or remove this constitutionally protected right." He was endorsed by the NRA Political Victory Fund and given an "A" rating. He was also endorsed by Gun Owners of America and given a rating of 75%.

=== Health care ===
Gosar opposed Obamacare and has advocated for physician-owned hospitals. He favors consumer choice of doctors, types of care and insurance plans. In 2026, he voted against extending the Affordable Care Act enhanced tax credits. He supported water fluoridation to prevent tooth decay in his early career as a dentist, but in 2022 spoke out against water fluoridation, citing concerns that it reduced human intelligence.

In September 2024, Congressman Gosar introduced legislation that would allow citizens to sue vaccine manufacturers for vaccine injuries. He argued that there was a lack of science concerning vaccine safety, adding that vaccine manufacturers should be held accountable for adverse effects of their vaccines, Gosar also said that his legislation strips away liability shields for Big Pharma and allows patients to pursue a civil lawsuit in state or federal court.

=== Immigration ===
The Arizona Republic described Gosar as "one of the staunchest opponents in Congress to legalizing undocumented dreamers". Gosar stated, "I strongly believe we need to immediately secure our border and oppose amnesty for anyone who blatantly violates our law." He has cosponsored legislation to repeal the 14th Amendment, thus eliminating birthright citizenship for children born in the US to undocumented immigrants. In a May 2018 interview, he accused immigration attorneys providing legal advice to undocumented immigrants of committing a crime: "What we need to do is also hold those that are actually helping — what they're saying is help, but assisting in a crime — to be prosecuted as well."

Gosar supported the building of the Mexico-U.S. border wall proposed by Trump. Gosar believes it will help stop MS-13 gang activity in the United States. He has proposed a 10-year moratorium on all immigration.

Gosar voted against the Fairness for High-Skilled Immigrants Act of 2019, which would amend the Immigration and Nationality Act to eliminate the per-country numerical limitation for employment-based immigrants, to increase the per-country numerical limitation for family-sponsored immigrants, and for other purposes.

Gosar voted against the Further Consolidated Appropriations Act of 2020, which authorizes DHS to nearly double the available H-2B visas for the remainder of FY 2020.

Gosar voted against the Consolidated Appropriations Act (H.R. 1158), which effectively prohibits ICE from cooperating with Health and Human Services to detain or remove illegal alien sponsors of unaccompanied alien children (UACs).

Gosar sponsored H.R. 6202, the American Tech Workforce Act of 2021, introduced by Representative Jim Banks. The legislation would establish a wage floor for the high-skill H-1B visa program, thereby significantly reducing employer dependence on the program. The bill would also eliminate the Optional Practical Training program that allows foreign graduates to stay and work in the United States.

=== Militias ===
In April 2014, Gosar joined a group of five conservative Arizona state legislators at the Bundy Standoff in Bunkerville, Nevada, where grazing fee resistors and their supporters took up arms against Federal Bureau of Land Management and law enforcement officials. The confrontation ended when federal officials chose not to take further action.

=== Native Americans ===
In December 2014, Gosar drew controversy when he referred to American Indians as "wards of the federal government." He was responding to concerns from members of the Fort Apache Indian Reservation in eastern Arizona when he made the comment at the round-table talk in Flagstaff. The discussion had addressed the proposal to swap 2,400 acres of southeastern Arizona's Tonto National Forest for about 5,300 acres of environmentally sensitive land. The proposal, which was attached as a rider to the 2015 National Defense Authorization Act, would give land sacred to the Apache in Arizona to Resolution Copper Mine, a joint venture owned by Rio Tinto and BHP. Troy Eid, a Republican and former U.S. Attorney in Colorado, responded to Gosar's comments, "In the heated context of what this represents, it's especially inappropriate to be resorting to what amounts to race baiting." A Gosar spokesperson said his comments were misconstrued.

=== Ties to the far right ===
In an October 2017 interview with Vice News, Gosar suggested that the white nationalist Unite the Right rally had been "created by the left", an idea previously expressed by Alex Jones of Infowars, Representative Dana Rohrabacher, Dinesh D'Souza, and other right-wing figures. Gosar also suggested that Jason Kessler, the organizer of the Charlottesville rally, might have been backed by George Soros, who he said "turned in his own people to the Nazis". Seven of Gosar's siblings wrote an open letter to the Kingman (Arizona) Daily Miner newspaper denouncing Gosar's claims about Soros as "despicable slander ... without a shred of truth", saying Gosar "owes George Soros a personal apology"; they also called his statements an "anti-semitic dog whistle".

In July 2018, Gosar spoke at a rally in London in support of former English Defence League leader and anti-Islam activist Tommy Robinson, emphasizing the importance of the right to free speech. Gosar and six other congressmen invited Robinson to speak to the Conservative Opportunity Society on November 14, 2018, while Robinson was visiting the United States on a trip sponsored by the Middle East Forum and the David Horowitz Freedom Center.

In 2019, Gosar sought to reinstate Representative Steve King to the House committees from which King had been removed due to a series of remarks widely seen as racist. Gosar agreed with King's contention that his words had been taken out of context. In February 2021, Gosar spoke with King at the second annual America First Political Action Conference, hosted by white nationalist Nick Fuentes.

In January 2021, The New York Times detailed Gosar's comments on and ties to the Proud Boys and the Oath Keepers, some of whose members participated in the 2021 storming of the United States Capitol. Jim Arroyo, who heads the Yavapai County, Arizona, chapter of Oath Keepers, said that Gosar had attended one of its meetings, "And we asked him, flat out: 'Do you think we are headed towards a Civil War?' And he said, 'We are in a Civil War, we just haven't started shooting yet'... So that is about to change."

==== Employment of prominent neo-Nazi follower and writer ====
Since November 2021, Gosar has employed Wade Searle, first as a temporary employee and then as his digital director. Searle is alleged to be a "dedicated acolyte" of Nick Fuentes, with Fuentes calling him a "loyal friend" and "one of the strongest soldiers of the movement." Searle has reportedly run several white supremacist accounts on X and Gab that have been using variations of the “ChickenRight” and “Chikken” handles, which have posted anti-semitic conspiracy theories about “HOOK-NOSED BANKERS.”

=== Treason accusations against the FBI and DOJ ===
In February 2018, Gosar posted on his Facebook page that the Nunes memo—in which Republican Congressman Devin Nunes accused the FBI and United States Department of Justice of illegally obtaining a Foreign Intelligence Surveillance Act (FISA) warrant to spy on Trump adviser Carter Page—showed "clear and convincing evidence" that certain members of those agencies committed treason. Additionally, he specifically referred to the conduct of the former FBI Director James Comey, former Deputy Director Andrew McCabe, former Deputy Attorney General Sally Yates, and former Attorney General Rod Rosenstein, describing them as "not just criminal but constitutes treason". In what Gosar called "my full statement on the declassified memo", he said he would be "leading [sic] a letter to the Attorney General seeking criminal prosecution against these traitors to our nation."

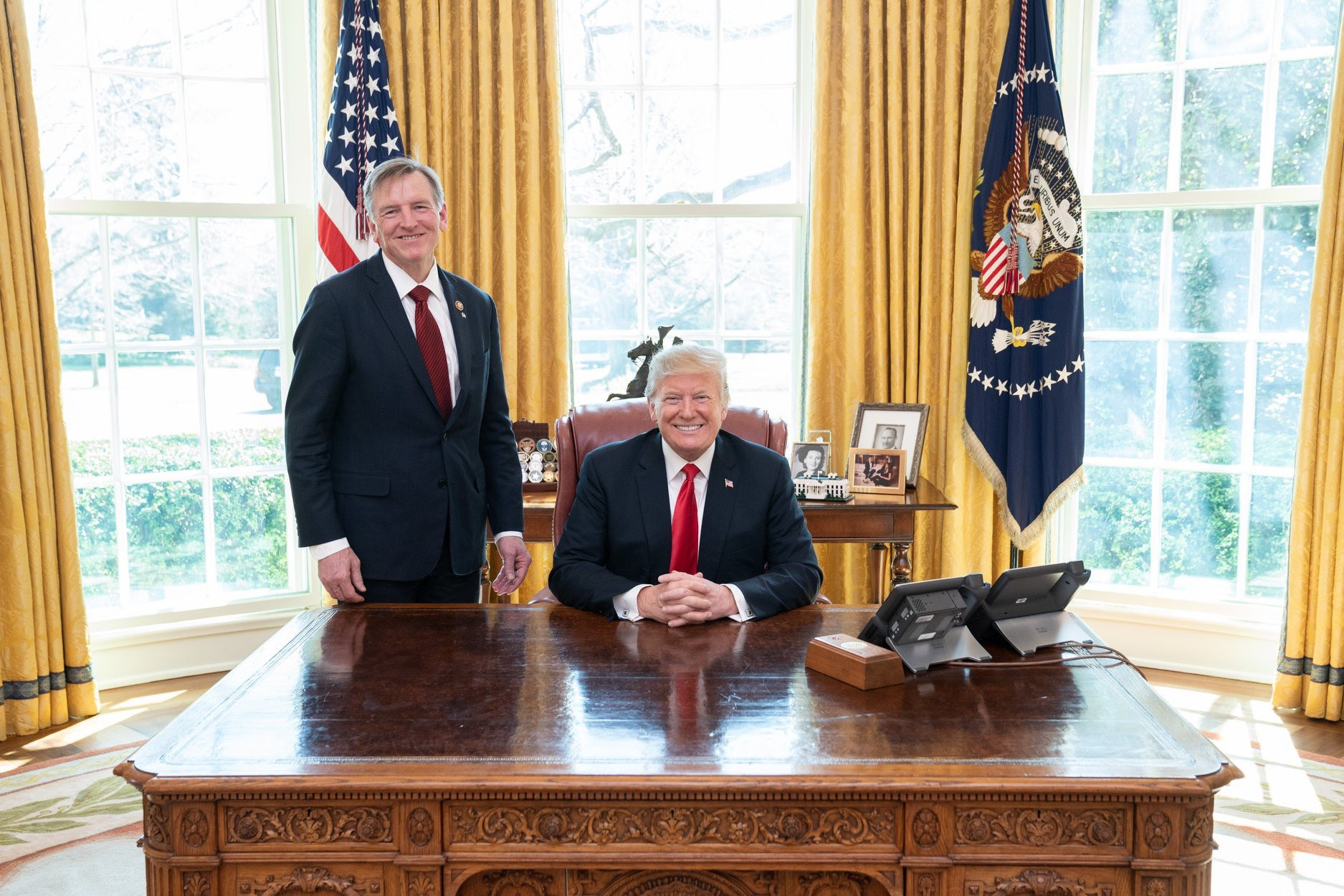
Paul Gosar with Donald Trump in 2019

=== Support for impeaching Biden administration officials ===
During the 117th United States Congress, Gosar was a co-sponsor of three resolutions to impeach President Joe Biden. He also co-sponsored a resolution to impeach Attorney General Merrick Garland and a resolution to impeach Secretary of Homeland Security Alejandro Mayorkas.

== Electoral history ==
Electoral history of Paul Gosar
Year	Office	Party	Primary			General			Result	Swing	Ref.
Year	Office	Party	Total	%	P.	Total	%	P.	Result	Swing	Ref.
2010	U.S. Representative	Republican	21,941	30.73%	1st	112,816	49.77%	1st	Won	Gain	
2012	U.S. Representative	Republican	40,033	51.35%	1st	162,907	66.83%	1st	Won	Hold	
2014	U.S. Representative	Republican	65,354	100.00%	1st	122,560	69.96%	1st	Won	Hold	
2016	U.S. Representative	Republican	64,947	71.42%	1st	203,487	71.45%	1st	Won	Hold	
2018	U.S. Representative	Republican	94,092	100.00%	1st	188,842	68.17%	1st	Won	Hold	
2020	U.S. Representative	Republican	82,376	63.13%	1st	278,002	69.74%	1st	Won	Hold	
2022	U.S. Representative	Republican	67,340	65.91%	1st	192,796	97.77%	1st	Won	Hold	
2024	U.S. Representative	Republican	89,308	100.00%	1st	249,583	65.30%	1st	Won	Hold	
2026	U.S. Representative	Republican	76,336	100.00%	1st	161,999	57.33%	1st	Won	Hold	

== Personal life ==
Gosar's wife is Maude Gosar (née Connor). The couple has three children.

Gosar is Catholic but has criticized Pope Francis's papacy as "inconsistent with Christianity" and skipped Francis's 2015 address to Congress in protest.

Gosar has arthritis and has had two compressed vertebrae in his back that have required surgery to correct. He cites years of hunching over for long periods while a dentist as the cause, as well as genetics and a history of playing rugby.

In 2018, six (David, Gaston, Grace, Jennifer, Joan, and Tim) of Gosar's nine siblings participated in ads supporting their brother's political adversary, David Brill. In the ads, they all state their desire to defend their family's name lest the world think the entire Gosar family shares Paul's ideology. David Gosar said, "He's absolutely not working for his district." Tim said, "He's not listening to you and he doesn't have your best interests at heart." Grace said, "Paul Gosar, the congressman, isn't doing anything to help rural America." Jennifer said, "If he actually cared about people in rural Arizona, I bet he'd be fighting for Social Security, for better access to healthcare; I bet he'd be researching what is the most insightful water policy to help the environment of Arizona to sustain itself and be successful."

== See also ==
- List of United States representatives expelled, censured, or reprimanded

U.S. House of Representatives
Preceded by Ann Kirkpatrick	Member of the U.S. House of Representatives from Arizona's 1st congressional district 2011–2013	Succeeded by Ann Kirkpatrick
Preceded by Ed Pastor	Member of the U.S. House of Representatives from Arizona's 4th congressional district 2013–2023	Succeeded by Greg Stanton
Preceded by Greg Stanton	Member of the U.S. House of Representatives from Arizona's 9th congressional district 2023–present	Incumbent
U.S. order of precedence (ceremonial)
Preceded by Chuck Fleischmann	United States representatives by seniority 81st	Succeeded by Morgan Griffith
