= Colin M. Simpson =

American politician

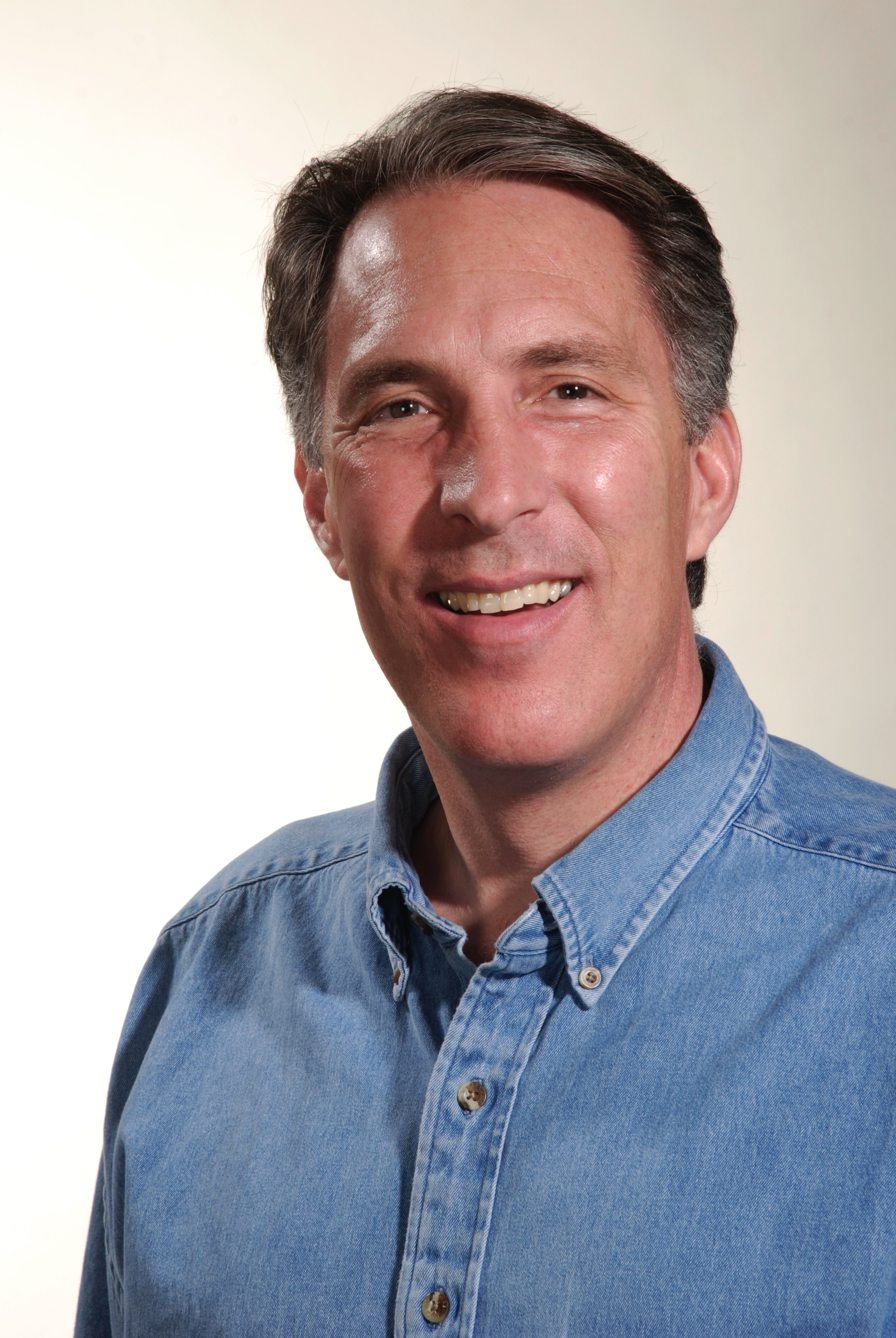

60th Speaker of the Wyoming House of Representatives
- In office January 13, 2009 – January 11, 2011
- Preceded by: Roy Cohee
- Succeeded by: Edward Buchanan

Member of the Wyoming House of Representatives from the 24th district
- In office January 1999 – January 11, 2011
- Preceded by: Peg Shreve
- Succeeded by: Sam Krone

Personal details
- Born: March 5, 1959 (age 67) Cheyenne, Wyoming, U.S.
- Party: Republican
- Spouse: Deborah Oakley
- Children: 2
- Parent: Alan Simpson (father)
- Relatives: Milward Simpson (grandfather); Pete Simpson (uncle)
- Education: Colorado College; University of Wyoming
- Profession: Attorney

Colin Mackenzie Simpson (born March 5, 1959) is an American lawyer and Republican politician who served in the Wyoming House of Representatives from District 24 from 1999 to 2011. He was the House Speaker during his last two years in office. He finished fourth in the Republican primary for the 2010 gubernatorial election. After leaving the legislature in early 2011, Simpson resumed his law practice in Cody.

== Family and personal life ==
Simpson was born in Cheyenne and is a fifth generation Wyomingite. His father was former U.S. Senator Alan Simpson; his grandfather was former U.S. Senator and Wyoming Governor Milward Simpson. An uncle, Pete Simpson, served in the Wyoming House and is a retired administrator at the University of Wyoming in Laramie.

Simpson is married to the former Deborah Oakley, who was reared in Kemmerer, Wyoming. The couple has two sons, Mackenzie and Nicholas. Simpson currently practices law in Cody and is a member of the Board of Trustees of the Buffalo Bill Historical Center there.

== 2010 gubernatorial candidacy ==
Simpson stated in an interview in the spring of 2008 that he was interested in running for governor, should Democratic Governor Dave Freudenthal be term-limited. Simpson filed to form an exploratory committee to run for governor. On March 18, 2010, he announced his candidacy for the Republican gubernatorial nomination and was immediately seen as the frontrunner for the nomination. His opponents included former state representative and former Director of Agriculture Ron Micheli, former U.S. Attorney Matt Mead, and State Auditor Rita Meyer. Mead narrowly won the nomination, with Meyer and Micheli in second and third places, respectively. Simpson then conceded and endorsed Mead's candidacy.

Preceded by Peg Shreve	Wyoming State Representative from District 24 (Park County); 1999–2010	Succeeded by Samuel P. Krone
Preceded by Roy Cohee	Speaker of the Wyoming House of Representatives; 2009–2010	Succeeded by Edward Buchanan
