= 2014 Wyoming gubernatorial election =

- November 4, 2014
- Turnout: 63.37% Registered ▼6.41% 34.00% of Total Population ▼4.17%
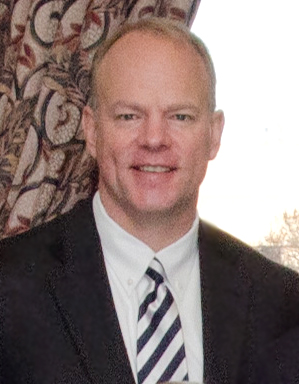

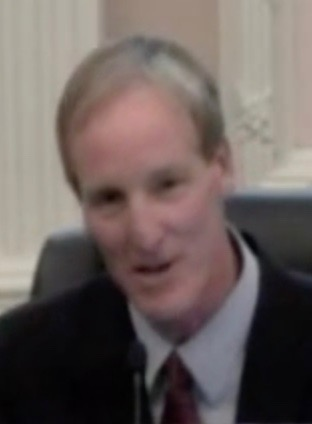

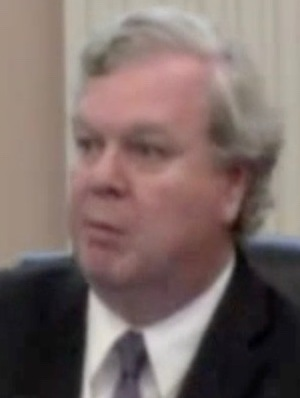
Nominee	Matt Mead	Pete Gosar	Don Wills
Party	Republican	Democratic	Independent
Popular vote	99,700	45,752	9,895
Percentage	59.39%	27.25%	5.89%
- County results Mead: 50–60% 60–70% 70–80% Gosar: 40–50%
Governor before election
Matt Mead
Republican
Elected Governor
Matt Mead
Republican

The 2014 Wyoming gubernatorial election was held on November 4, 2014, to elect the governor of Wyoming. The election coincided with elections to other federal and state offices.

Incumbent Republican governor Matt Mead ran for re-election to a second term in office. Mead won the election with 59% of the vote, defeating Democrat Pete Gosar, Independent candidate Don Wills and Libertarian Dee Cozzens.

== Republican primary ==
=== Candidates ===
==== Declared ====
- Taylor Haynes, physician, rancher and Independent write-in candidate for governor in 2010
- Cindy Hill, State Superintendent of Public Instruction
- Matt Mead, incumbent governor

=== Polling ===
Poll source	Date(s) administered	Sample size	Margin of error	Matt Mead	Cindy Hill	Undecided
Public Policy Polling	July 19–21, 2013	780	± 3.5%	69%	15%	16%

=== Results ===
Results by county: Mead: Mead—70–80%; Mead—60–70%; Mead—50–60%; Mead—40–50%; Haynes: Haynes—40–50%

Republican primary results
Party	Candidate	Votes	%
Republican	Matt Mead (incumbent)	53,673	54.04
Republican	Taylor Haynes	31,532	31.75
Republican	Cindy Hill	12,464	12.55
Republican	Write-in	215	0.22
Republican	Over Votes	26	0.03
Republican	Under Votes	1,402	1.41
Total votes		99,312	100

== Democratic primary ==
=== Candidates ===
==== Declared ====
- Pete Gosar, former chairman of the Wyoming Democratic Party, candidate for governor in 2010 and brother of Arizona Republican U.S. representative Dr. Paul Gosar

=== Results ===
Results by county: Gosar—>90%

Democratic primary results
Party	Candidate	Votes	%
Democratic	Pete Gosar	15,289	83.52
Democratic	Write-in	510	2.78
Democratic	Over Votes	5	0.03
Democratic	Under Votes	2,502	13.67
Total votes		18,306	100

== General election ==
=== Predictions ===
Source	Ranking	As of
The Cook Political Report	Solid R	November 3, 2014
Sabato's Crystal Ball	Safe R	November 3, 2014
Rothenberg Political Report	Safe R	November 3, 2014
Real Clear Politics	Safe R	November 3, 2014

=== Polling ===
Poll source	Date(s) administered	Sample size	Margin of error	Matt Mead (R)	Pete Gosar (D)	Other	Undecided
CBS News/NYT/YouGov	October 16–23, 2014	258	± 11%	58%	33%	0%	9%
Mason-Dixon	October 6–8, 2014	625	± 4%	53%	28%	6%	13%
CBS News/NYT/YouGov	September 20–October 1, 2014	264	± 7%	53%	30%	7%	11%
CBS News/NYT/YouGov	August 18–September 2, 2014	350	± 8%	53%	25%	12%	9%
Rasmussen Reports	August 20–21, 2014	700	± 4%	55%	34%	7%	4%
CBS News/NYT/YouGov	July 5–24, 2014	416	± 5.1%	53%	25%	16%	5%

Hypothetical polling

With Mead

Poll source	Date(s) administered	Sample size	Margin of error	Matt Mead (R)	Dave Freudenthal (D)	Other	Undecided
Public Policy Polling	July 19–21, 2013	1,203	± 2.8%	47%	36%	—	17%

Poll source	Date(s) administered	Sample size	Margin of error	Matt Mead (R)	Gary Trauner (D)	Other	Undecided
Public Policy Polling	July 19–21, 2013	1,203	± 2.8%	62%	20%	—	18%

With Hill

Poll source	Date(s) administered	Sample size	Margin of error	Cindy Hill (R)	Dave Freudenthal (D)	Other	Undecided
Public Policy Polling	July 19–21, 2013	1,203	± 2.8%	23%	57%	—	20%

Poll source	Date(s) administered	Sample size	Margin of error	Cindy Hill (R)	Gary Trauner (D)	Other	Undecided
Public Policy Polling	July 19–21, 2013	1,203	± 2.8%	29%	38%	—	33%

=== Results ===
Results map by county with pie charts

Wyoming gubernatorial election, 2014
Party	Candidate	Votes	%	±%
Republican	Matt Mead (incumbent)	99,700	59.39%	−6.29%
Democratic	Pete Gosar	45,752	27.25%	+4.31%
Independent	Don Wills	9,895	5.89%	N/A
Write-in		8,490	5.06%	+3.85%
Libertarian	Dee Cozzens	4,040	2.41%	−0.44%
Total votes		167,877	100.00%	N/A
Republican hold				

==== By county ====
County	Matt Mead Republican		Pete Gosar Democratic		Don Wills Independent		Dee Cozzens Libertarian		Write-ins		Margin		Total
County	#	%	#	%	#	%	#	%	#	%	#	%	Total
Albany	4,520	43.75%	4,885	47.28%	386	3.74%	215	2.08%	325	3.15%	−365	−3.53%	10,331
Big Horn	2,717	66.38%	545	13.32%	214	5.23%	385	9.41%	232	5.67%	2,172	53.07%	4,093
Campbell	7,667	72.38%	1,267	11.96%	722	6.82%	242	2.28%	694	6.55%	6,400	60.42%	10,592
Carbon	2,948	64.95%	1,164	25.64%	185	4.08%	87	1.92%	155	3.41%	1,784	39.30%	4,539
Converse	2,572	61.24%	823	19.60%	344	8.19%	79	1.88%	382	9.10%	1,749	41.64%	4,200
Crook	1,970	71.51%	304	11.03%	193	7.01%	73	2.65%	215	7.80%	1,666	60.47%	2,755
Fremont	6,655	54.50%	4,126	33.79%	523	4.28%	221	1.81%	687	5.63%	2,529	20.71%	12,212
Goshen	2,494	58.65%	1,066	25.07%	351	8.25%	117	2.75%	224	5.27%	1,428	33.58%	4,252
Hot Springs	1,155	57.52%	536	26.69%	173	8.62%	73	3.64%	71	3.54%	619	30.83%	2,008
Johnson	2,179	66.27%	812	24.70%	156	4.74%	51	1.55%	90	2.74%	1,367	41.58%	3,288
Laramie	14,270	55.30%	7,780	30.15%	1,251	4.85%	626	2.43%	1,876	7.27%	6,490	25.15%	25,803
Lincoln	4,045	70.14%	867	15.03%	426	7.39%	148	2.57%	281	4.87%	3,178	55.11%	5,767
Natrona	12,454	59.11%	5,796	27.51%	1,390	6.60%	358	1.70%	1,072	5.09%	6,658	31.60%	21,070
Niobrara	579	55.89%	167	16.12%	83	8.01%	27	2.61%	180	17.37%	399	38.51%	1,036
Park	6,163	65.14%	1,518	16.04%	990	10.46%	373	3.94%	417	4.41%	4,645	49.10%	9,461
Platte	1,857	52.70%	915	25.96%	283	8.03%	85	2.41%	384	10.90%	942	26.73%	3,524
Sheridan	6,400	67.16%	2,311	24.25%	457	4.80%	153	1.61%	208	2.18%	4,089	42.91%	9,529
Sublette	1,757	54.75%	968	30.17%	198	6.17%	52	1.62%	234	7.29%	789	24.59%	3,209
Sweetwater	6,431	57.03%	3,857	34.20%	541	4.80%	243	2.15%	205	1.82%	2,574	22.83%	11,277
Teton	3,998	50.37%	3,573	45.01%	192	2.42%	115	1.45%	60	0.76%	425	5.35%	7,938
Uinta	3,251	57.11%	1,620	28.46%	396	6.96%	168	2.95%	258	4.53%	1,631	28.65%	5,693
Washakie	2,041	71.79%	500	17.59%	121	4.26%	102	3.59%	79	2.78%	1,541	54.20%	2,843
Weston	1,577	64.18%	352	14.33%	320	13.02%	47	1.91%	161	6.55%	1,225	49.86%	2,457
Totals	99,700	59.39%	45,752	27.25%	9,895	5.89%	4,040	2.41%	8,490	5.06%	53,948	32.14%	167,877

Counties that flipped from Republican to Democratic

- Albany (largest city: Laramie)
