= Pete Gosar =

American politician

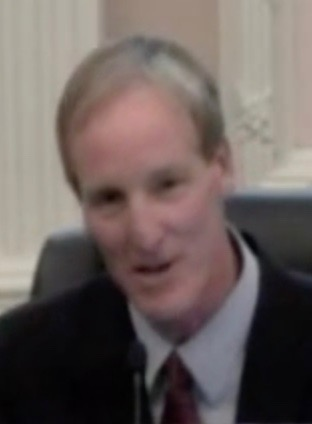

Chair of the Wyoming Board of Education
- In office February 14, 2015 – February 18, 2017
- Preceded by: Ron Micheli
- Succeeded by: Walt Wilcox

Personal details
- Born: Peter Thomas Gosar; December 29, 1967 (age 58) Rock Springs, Wyoming, U.S.
- Party: Democratic
- Relatives: Paul Gosar (brother)
- Education: San Juan College; University of Wyoming (BA)

Peter Thomas Gosar (born December 29, 1967) is an American politician. Gosar was the Democratic nominee for Governor of Wyoming in 2014 but lost to Republican Matt Mead. Gosar also served as chair of the Wyoming Democratic Party and as chair of the Wyoming Board of Education.

== Early life and education ==
Gosar was born in Rock Springs, Wyoming to Antone John Gosar and Bernadette M. (née Erramouspe) Gosar, the seventh of ten children, and is of Basque and Slovenian descent. He grew up in Pinedale, Wyoming and is the younger brother of Paul Gosar, a Republican U.S. Representative from Arizona.

Gosar attended the University of Wyoming from 1986 until 1990, where he played linebacker on the Wyoming Cowboys football team. He also holds an associate degree in aviation technology from San Juan College, which he obtained in 1999.

== Career ==
Gosar was a teacher with the Pinedale Public Schools.

Gosar first ran for governor of Wyoming in 2010, but lost the Democratic primary to Leslie Petersen. He again ran for governor in 2014, when he won the Democratic primary unopposed but lost the general election to Republican incumbent Matt Mead.

Gosar served as a member of the Wyoming Board of Education from 2011 until 2017. He was Chairman of the Board beginning in 2015. His term as chairman and his tenure on the Board of Education ended on February 18, 2017. He was succeeded as chairman by Walt Wilcox.

Gosar has also served as chairman of the Democratic Party of Wyoming.

Gosar has served as an Albany County Commissioner since 2018. He is presently the Albany County Commission Chairman. Gosar was a pilot in for the State of Wyoming for many years, and later became a pilot in Laramie, Wyoming.

Gosar has been the Executive Director of the Downtown Clinic, a free clinic in Laramie, Wyoming, since 2015. Before this, he was on the Board of Directors of the Downtown Clinic.

== Political positions ==
Gosar is often contrasted with his brother, Paul Gosar, an Arizona congressman who is a staunch conservative. While Paul supports criminalizing abortion, Pete believes it should be legal. He is a supporter of the Patient Protection and Affordable Care Act.

Peter has appeared in advertisements for Paul's Democratic opponent as well as advertisements denouncing Paul.

Party political offices
Preceded by Leslie Petersen	Democratic nominee for Governor of Wyoming; 2014	Succeeded by Mary Throne
