= Yavapai County Preparedness Team =

U.S. right-wing non-profit organization

- Abbreviation: YCPT
- Founder: Jim Arroyo
- Type: Nonprofit
- Headquarters: Yavapai County, Arizona
- Location: United States
- Region served: US, Canada, UK, Panama
- Services: Disaster preparedness training
- Affiliations: Lions of Liberty
- Website: ycpt.org

Yavapai County Preparedness Team, often known as YCPT, is an U.S. nonprofit organisation registered as a 501(c)(3) organization in Yavapai County, Arizona and founded by Jim Arroyo.

The group provides training for disaster scenarios and undertook monitoring of ballot boxes in 2022.

== Organization ==
YCPT is a right-wing American nonprofit organisation registered as a 501(c)(3) organization in Yavapai County, Arizona. It was founded by Jim Arroyo, a former member of the Oath Keepers and is led by Arroyo and his wife Janet. The group claims to have chapters in fourteen states in the U.S., as well as in the United Kingdom, Panama, and Canada.

The group provides training for disaster scenarios including war, economic collapse, natural and man-made disasters. Skills taught include first aid, communications, and warcraft.

=== Lions of Liberty ===
The group's political arm is the Lions of Liberty, which advocates against "global elites, communists, leftists, deep state bureaucrats, and fake news" and to "bring God back to our leadership and win this spiritual battle for the soul of our nation.” In 2022, Lions of Liberty, with the YCPT, undertook surveillance of ballot boxes, in an effort they named Operation: Drop Box. After being named in a lawsuit by League of Women Voters and accused of voter intimidation and breaking the Voting Rights Act, the groups both stopped the monitoring.

== See also ==
- List of militia organizations in the United States
