= Cynthia Cloud =

American politician

27th Auditor of Wyoming
- In office January 3, 2011 – January 7, 2019
- Governor: Matt Mead
- Preceded by: Rita Meyer
- Succeeded by: Kristi Racines

Personal details
- Born: February 22, 1969 (age 56)
- Political party: Republican
- Spouse: Charles Cloud
- Children: 4
- Education: University of Alabama, Tuscaloosa (BS)

Cynthia I. Cloud (born February 22, 1969) is the former Republican state auditor of Wyoming, United States, the twentieth person to hold the position. She was elected in 2010, when the incumbent Rita Meyer instead ran unsuccessfully for governor of Wyoming against fellow Republican Matt Mead.

== Education ==
Cloud graduated magna cum laude from the University of Alabama at Tuscaloosa, Alabama, with a degree in accounting. When she previously resided in Cody, she completed the Park County Leadership Institute.

== Personal life ==
Cynthia and her husband, Charles Morgan Cloud, have four children.

== Electoral history ==
Wyoming Auditor Republican Primary Election, 2010
Party	Candidate	Votes	%
Republican	Cynthia Cloud	47,427	50.76
Republican	Bruce Brown	45,861	49.08
Republican	Write-ins	151	0.16

Wyoming Auditor Election, 2010
Party	Candidate	Votes	%
Republican	Cynthia Cloud	157,848	99.00
Write-ins	Write-ins	1,598	1.00

Wyoming Auditor Election, 2014
Party	Candidate	Votes	%
Republican	Cynthia Cloud (inc.)	138,216	99.05
Write-ins	Write-ins	1,325	0.95

Political offices
Preceded by Rita Meyer	Auditor of Wyoming; 2011–2019	Succeeded by Kristi Racines
