= Alan Simpson (American politician) =

American politician (1931–2025)

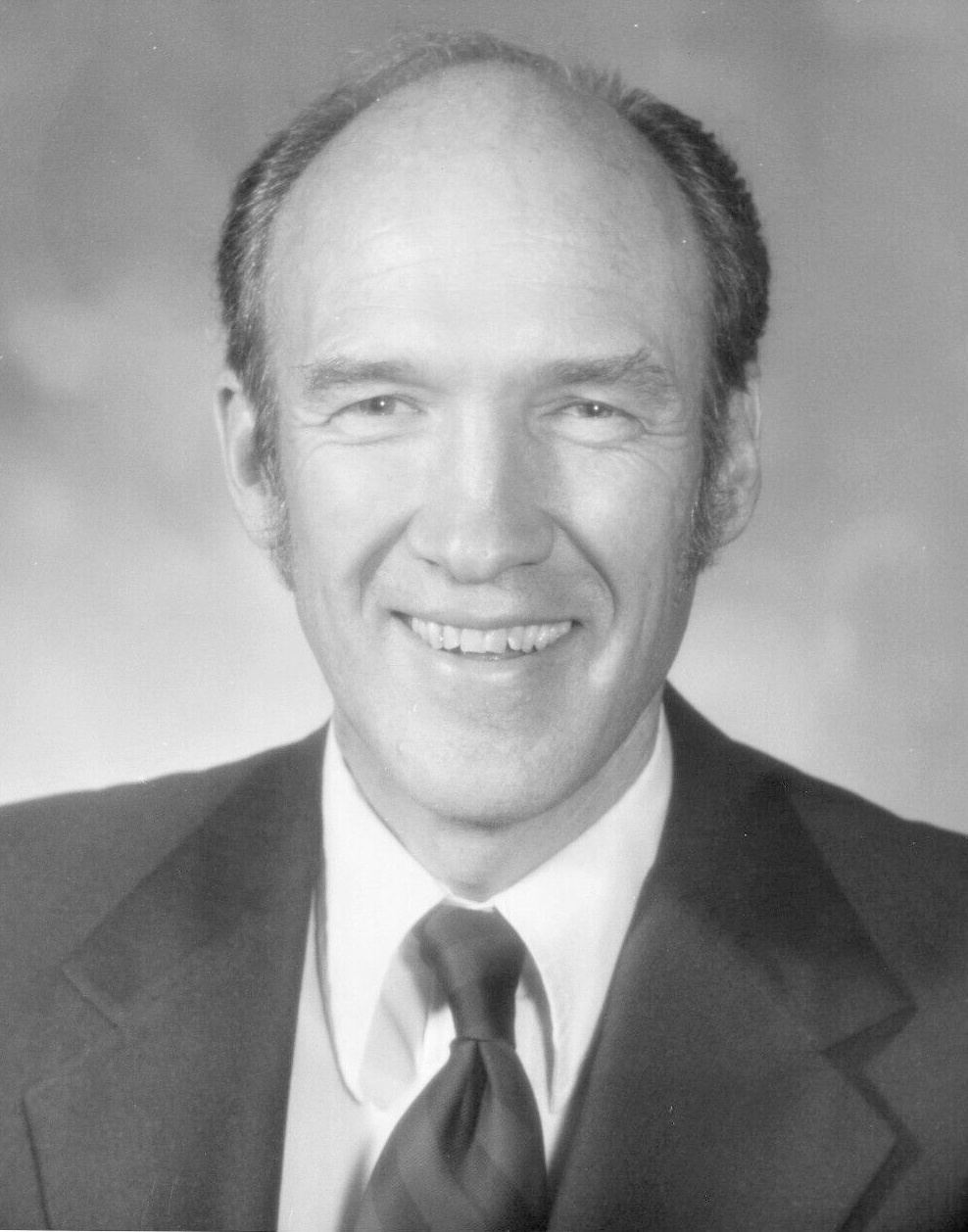
- Official portrait, c. 1970s

Co-Chair of the National Commission on Fiscal Responsibility and Reform
- In office February 18, 2010 – December 1, 2010 Serving with Erskine Bowles
- Appointed by: Barack Obama

Senate Minority Whip
- In office January 3, 1987 – January 3, 1995
- Leader: Bob Dole
- Preceded by: Alan Cranston
- Succeeded by: Wendell Ford

Senate Majority Whip
- In office January 3, 1985 – January 3, 1987
- Leader: Bob Dole
- Preceded by: Ted Stevens
- Succeeded by: Alan Cranston

United States Senator from Wyoming
- In office January 1, 1979 – January 3, 1997
- Preceded by: Clifford Hansen
- Succeeded by: Mike Enzi

Member of the Wyoming House of Representatives from Park County
- In office January 1965 – November 10, 1977

Personal details
- Born: Alan Kooi Simpson; September 2, 1931 Denver, Colorado, U.S.
- Died: March 14, 2025 (aged 93) Cody, Wyoming, U.S.
- Party: Republican
- Spouse: Susan Ann Schroll (m. 1954)
- Children: 3, including Colin
- Relatives: Milward Simpson (father); Pete Simpson (brother)
- Education: University of Wyoming (BS, JD)
- Awards: Presidential Medal of Freedom (2022)

Military service
- Allegiance: United States
- Branch/service: United States Army
- Years of service: 1954–1956
- Rank: Second Lieutenant
- Unit: 5th Infantry; 2nd Armored Division
- Simpson's voice Simpson on the contributions of the Hispanic community to Wyoming; Recorded September 16, 1992

Alan Kooi Simpson (September 2, 1931 – March 14, 2025) was an American politician from Wyoming who served as a member of the Wyoming House of Representatives representing Park County, Wyoming from 1965 to 1977 and as a member of the United States Senate from 1979 to 1997. Simpson was Republican whip of the U.S. Senate from 1985 to 1995, serving as majority whip of the U.S. Senate from 1985 to 1987. He also served as co-chair of the National Commission on Fiscal Responsibility and Reform (often referred to as Simpson–Bowles) with Democratic co-chair Erskine Bowles of North Carolina.

Born in Denver, Simpson completed his undergraduate and law school studies at the University of Wyoming. He served in the Wyoming House of Representatives from 1965–1977 before being elected to the U.S. Senate in 1978. After serving three terms, Simpson declined to seek re-election in 1996. After leaving office, Simpson practiced law and taught at multiple universities. He also served on the Continuity of Government Commission, American Battle Monuments Commission, and Iraq Study Group. He was a vocal proponent of amending the Constitution of the United States to overturn Citizens United v. FEC (2010) and allow Congress to set spending limits on campaign finance.

== Early life ==
Simpson was born in Denver, Colorado, on September 2, 1931, the son of Milward Simpson and the former Lorna Kooi. His middle name, Kooi, comes from his maternal grandfather, whose parents were Dutch immigrants. Simpson had an older brother, Pete Simpson, a historian and former administrator at the University of Wyoming in Laramie, Wyoming, who served in the Wyoming House of Representatives from 1981 to 1984, having represented Sheridan County, Wyoming, while he was then an administrator at Sheridan College. Pete Simpson was the 1986 Republican gubernatorial nominee, having sought the office while his younger brother was serving in the U.S. Senate.

Simpson had several run-ins with the law during his youth, later remarking, "I was just dumb and rebellious and stupid. And a different person," adding that "you're not who you are when you're 16 or 18. You're dumb and you don't care, and you think you are eternal." For the 2010 Supreme Court of the United States case Graham v. Florida on the constitutionality of sentencing juveniles to life imprisonment without parole for non-homicide offenses, Simpson submitted an amicus curiae brief explaining his own troubled youth:

In Simpson's words to this Court, "I was a monster." One day in Cody, Wyoming, when Simpson was in high school, he and some friends "went out to do damage." They went to an abandoned war relocation structure and decided to "torch" it. They committed arson on federal property, a crime punishable by up to twenty years in prison if no one is hurt and punishable by up to life in prison if the arson causes a person's death, Luckily for Simpson, no one was injured in the blaze. Simpson not only played with fire, but also with guns. He played a game with his friends in which they shot at rocks close to one another, at times using bullets they stole from the local hardware store. The goal of the game was to come as close as possible to striking someone without actually doing so. Again, Simpson was lucky: no one was killed or seriously injured. Simpson and his friends went shooting throughout their community. They fired their rifles at mailboxes, blowing holes in several and killing a cow. They fired their weapons at a road grader. "We just raised hell," Simpson says. Federal authorities charged Simpson with destroying government property and Simpson pleaded guilty. He received two years of probation and was required to make restitution from his own funds.

Alan Simpson graduated from Cody High School in Cody, Wyoming in 1949 and attended Cranbrook School in Bloomfield Hills, Michigan, in 1950 for a postgraduate year. He graduated from the University of Wyoming with a Bachelor of Science degree in 1954. Like his brother, he was a member of the university's Alpha Tau Omega fraternity. Simpson served in the United States Army in Germany from 1955 to 1956 with the 10th Infantry Regiment of the 5th Infantry Division and the 12th Armored Infantry Battalion of the 2nd Armored Division.

After graduating from the University of Wyoming College of Law in 1958, he joined a private law firm and eventually became the city attorney of Cody, Wyoming. Simpson was first elected to the Wyoming House of Representatives in 1964. During his tenure, Simpson represented Park County and served as the speaker pro tempore of the Wyoming State Legislature. He resigned on November 10, 1977, to prepare to run for the U.S. Senate in 1978.

== United States Senator ==
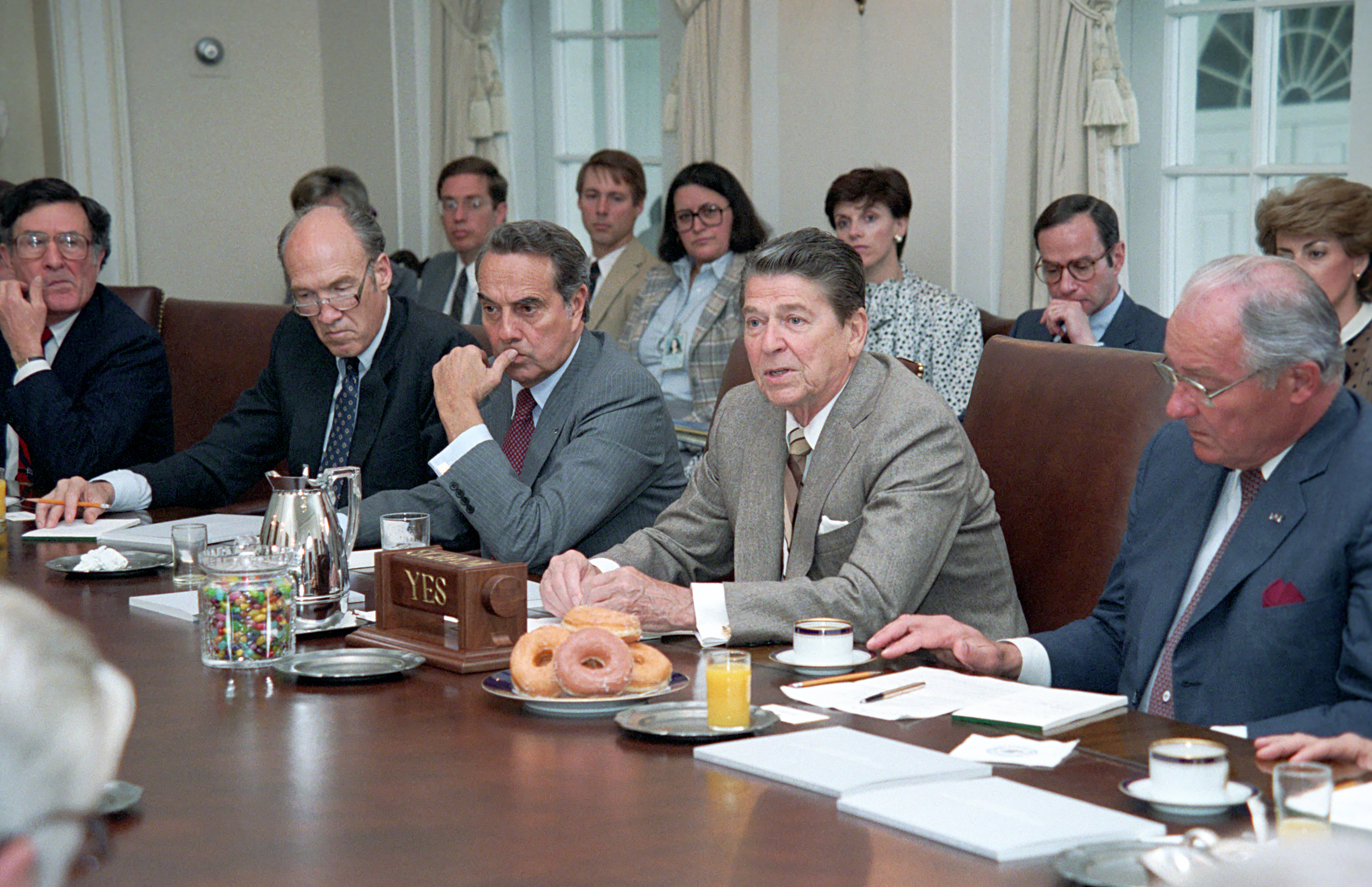
Simpson (second from left) in a Cabinet Room meeting with President Ronald Reagan, Bob Michel and Bob Dole, 1985

Simpson was elected to the United States Senate on November 7, 1978, but was appointed to the post early on January 1, 1979, following the resignation of Clifford Hansen, former Governor of Wyoming from 1963 to 1967 who had succeeded Milward Simpson, Alan's father who was Governor of Wyoming from 1955 to 1959, in the seat. From 1985 to 1995, Simpson was the Republican whip, assisting Republican leader of the United States Senate Bob Dole from Kansas. He was chairman of the Senate Veterans' Affairs Committee from 1981 to 1985 and again from 1995 to 1997 when Republicans regained control of the Senate. He also chaired the Immigration and Refugee Subcommittee of Judiciary, Nuclear Regulation Subcommittee, Social Security Subcommittee, and Committee on Aging.

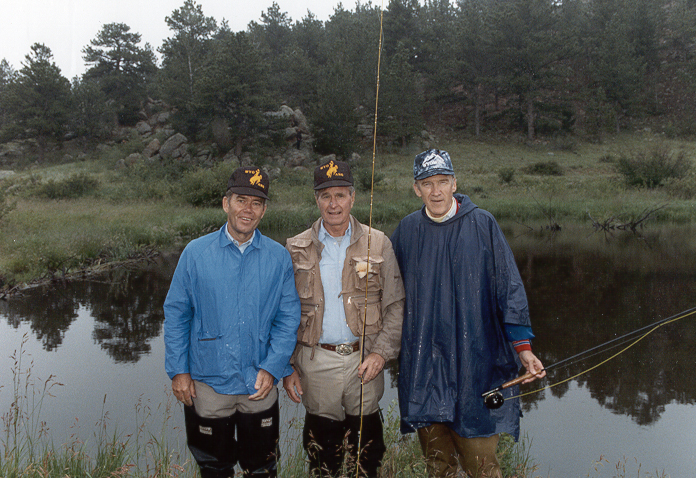
Simpson fishing in Wyoming with President of the United States George H. W. Bush (center) and United States Senate member Craig L. Thomas (left)

Simpson was characterized as a moderate conservative by The New York Times upon his death in 2025. Contemporaneously he was known as a hardline conservative who was loyal to Ronald Reagan's policies. He supported the abortion-rights movement and in 1995 and 1996, he voted against a ban of late-term abortions that only exempted life-threatening conditions, rather than all physical health needs. However, he opposed federal funding for abortions by supporting the Hyde Amendment. In 2013, Simpson stating that abortion should not be a political issue in a party that believes in "government out of our lives," "the right to be left alone," and "the precious right of privacy".

In the early 1980s, illegal immigrants were prohibited from working in the United States, but employers were not penalized for hiring them as unreported employment. Alongside Democratic Party United States House of Representatives member Peter W. Rodino from New Jersey, Simpson was the main force behind the Immigration Reform and Control Act of 1986, which included a provision prohibiting the intentional hiring of illegal immigrants, while providing legal status to those that arrived before 1982.

As a ranking minority member of the Senate Subcommittee on Immigration and Refugee Affairs in 1987, he drew criticism for calling Hmong who had fought for the United States fleeing to the US in the aftermath of the Vietnam War "the most indigestible group in society" for their perceived inability to adhere to white American norms, which Hmong American scholar Kou Yang said was at the time the "worst of all" comments on Hmong. Rubén G. Rumbaut highlighted the irony of Simpson's derogatory characterization of Hmong in a 1999 study that showed that Hmong students in San Diego schools "outperform[ed] all native-born English-only American students". Reflecting on his work for the American Sociological Association's Contexts, Rambaut said, "One thing I know is that popular conceptions about immigrants and their assimilation don’t square with the facts." Rambaut saw Simpson's use of the word "indigestible" as indicative that Simpson was imagining an assimilation where Hmong were absorbed into the more desirable Anglo-Saxon race. Natsu Taylor Saito concurred: "[Simpson thinks] they [Hmong] should be fully 'digestible'; their purpose is to nourish settler society, not to change it." Dwight Conquergood remarked Simpson's comments were typical of Western visitors to the largest Hmong refugee camp in Thailand, the Ban Vinai Refugee Camp. "Instead of seeing the Hmong as struggling within a constraining context of historical, political, and economic forces that have reduced them from proud, independent, mountain people to landless refugees, the Hmong are blamed for their miserable condition." Shelly R. Adler likened Simpson's comments to an article in The New York Times that asserted the Hmong were “the most primitive refugee group in America"—to which Paul Pao Herr, a Hmong reader of the paper responded, "[E]vidently we were not too primitive to fight as proxies for the United States troops in the war in Laos". In the most widely read book on Hmong people The Spirit Catches You and You Fall Down, which chronicles a Hmong family's struggles with the US healthcare system, Anne Fadiman draws a parallel between Simpson and the historical Chinese government, which also sought to assimilate the Hmong ethnic minority among them. "...[Simpson] sounded much like the authorities in China long ago who were grievously insulted when the Hmong refused to speak Chinese or eat with chopsticks." Simpson visited Ban Vinai for one day during his tenure on the immigration subcommittee.

Simpson frequently derided immigrants and refugees for not meeting his standards for assimilation into white US cultural norms and was at the forefront of opposing immigration. From 1980 to 1996, Simpson was "the leading voice attacking family immigration" according to Annelise Anderson of Stanford University. Simpson advocated for removing sibling immigration entirely, on the basis that in the United States siblings were not "important relatives". Christian Joppke dubbed Simpson "the Republican leader of immigration reform in Congress". In one effort to reduce undocumented immigration, Simpson proposed a national magnetic strip-enabled identity card, an idea that was strongly opposed by both Democrats and Republicans, and likened to Nazi Germany.

Simpson championed the Immigration Reform Act of 1995, which further restricted legal immigration avenues and the rights of immigrants, particularly staunching family reuinification, ostensibly in favor of degree-holding workers. Vijay Prashad argued measures such as the slew of immigration bills Simpson supported were rather a new wave of white supremacist sentiment, aimed especially at Latinos and Asians who were perceived by white Americans as "fundamentally 'immigrant' despite their generations-long presence in the United States". Simpson's 1995 bill "reinforce[d] the idea that immigrants are only wanted for their labor and not for their lives".

Simpson resented the influence American Association of Retired Persons (AARP) had on protecting senior social programs like Social Security and Medicare—once referring to AARP as "evil".

In his youth, Simpson was a Boy Scout and once visited Japanese American Scouts who, along with their families, were interned near Ralston, Wyoming, during World War II. He developed a life-long friendship with Norman Mineta, who later served as a Democratic member of the U.S. House of Representatives from California from 1975 to 1995 and as the United States Secretary of Transportation during the Presidency of George W. Bush from 2001 to 2006. Their friendship spurred Simpson to support the Civil Liberties Act of 1988, which provided reparations to Japanese Americans subjected to internment. Aside from their time in Congress, Mineta and Simpson also served on the Smithsonian Institution's Board of Regents.

Simpson voted in favor of the 1983 Passage of Martin Luther King Jr. Day establishing Martin Luther King Jr. Day as a federal holiday and initially voted in favor of the Civil Rights Restoration Act of 1987, though he voted to sustain President Ronald Reagan's veto. Simpson voted in favor of the Robert Bork Supreme Court nomination and Clarence Thomas Supreme Court nomination, the former of which failed.

Simpson was considered as a potential vice presidential candidate for George H. W. Bush in the 1988 United States presidential election.

In March 1991, Simpson denounced CNN (Cable News Network) journalist Peter Arnett as a sympathizer for Saddam Hussein over the latter's reporting from Baghdad, Iraq, during the Gulf War. Simpson was harshly criticized for questioning Arnett's patriotism based on the latter's 1964 marriage to a Vietnamese woman rumored, but never confirmed, to be related to Viet Cong soldiers. In a letter to The New York Times, Simpson apologized for disparaging Arnett's family.

At 6 ft 7 in (201 cm), Simpson was the tallest Senator in United States history until overtaken by 6 ft 9 in (206 cm) Luther Strange of Alabama in 2017, 20 years after his retirement. Simpson would later claim to have shrunk to 6 ft 5 in (196 cm) at age 85.

== Post-Senate career ==
In 1995, he lost the position of Republican whip to U.S. Senate member Trent Lott from Mississippi, and he did not seek reelection to the Senate in 1996. From 1997 to 2000, Simpson taught at the Shorenstein Center on Media, Politics, and Public Policy at Harvard University's Harvard Kennedy School in Cambridge, Massachusetts, and he served for two years as the Director of the Institute of Politics at the Kennedy School.

Simpson then returned to his hometown of Cody and practiced law there with his two sons (William and Colin) in the firm of Simpson, Kepler and Edwards. The three were also partners in the firm of Burg Simpson Eldredge Hersh & Jardine in Englewood, Colorado. Colin M. Simpson, the third generation of his family in Wyoming politics, was a Republican member of the Wyoming House of Representatives who served as its Speaker from 2008 to March 2010. Colin Simpson finished fourth in the 2010 Republican gubernatorial primary election.

Simpson periodically taught at his alma mater, the University of Wyoming, with his brother Pete. From 2001 to 2005, he served as chairman of the UW Campaign for Distinction, which raised $204 million.

In 2018, Simpson was chosen as one of four speakers to eulogize President George H.W. Bush at his state funeral.

Simpson was involved in the 2002 Wyoming Republican gubernatorial primary on behalf of former Democrat Eli Bebout of Riverton, Wyoming.

=== Iraq Study Group ===
In 2006, Simpson was one of ten (five Democratic and five Republican) contributors to the Iraq Study Group Report.

=== National Commission on Fiscal Responsibility and Reform ===
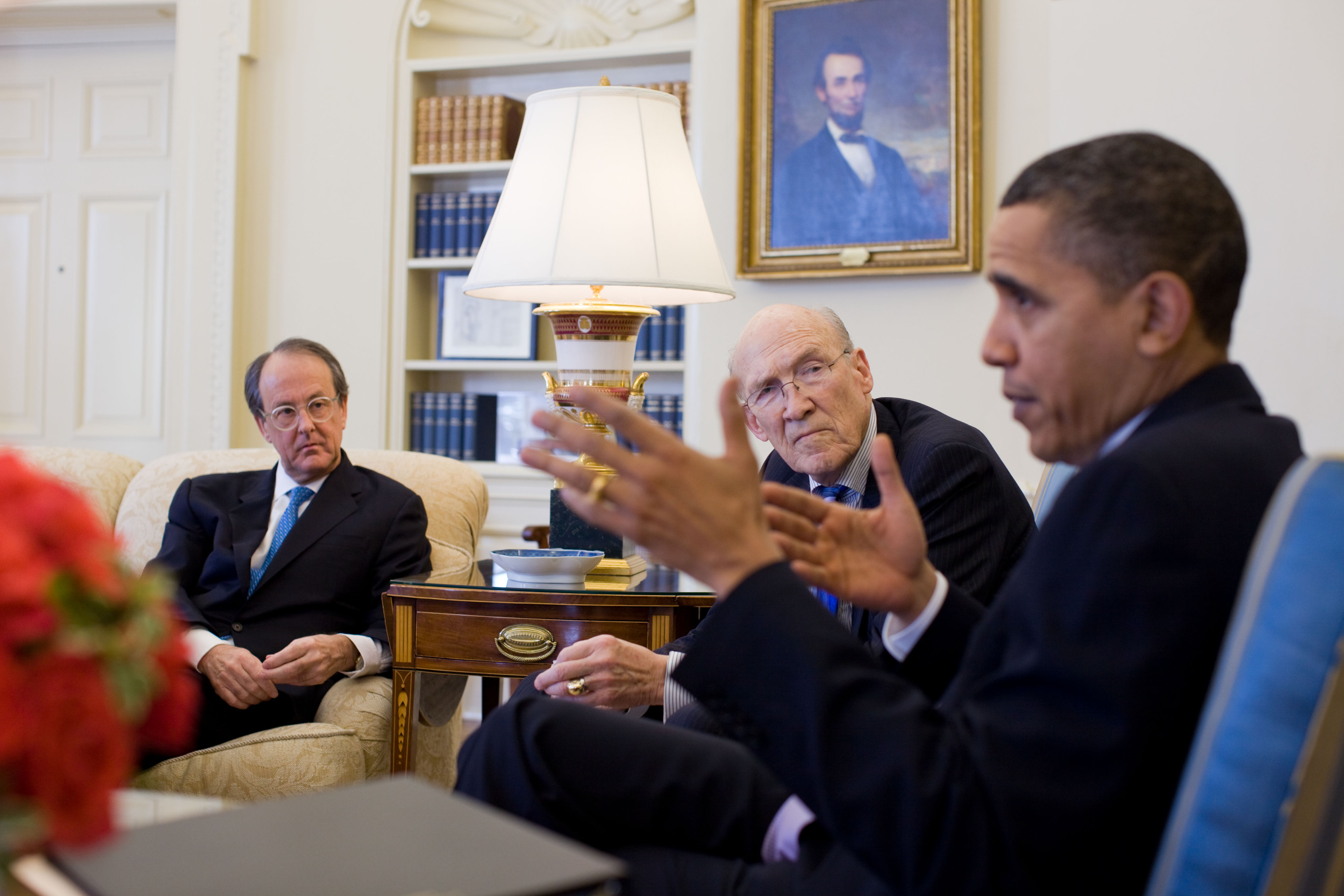
Simpson and Erskine Bowles meet with President Obama in 2010.

In 2010, Simpson was appointed to co-chair President Obama's National Commission on Fiscal Responsibility and Reform with Erskine Bowles. Simpson extensively spoke about the burden being placed on future generations by the structure of current entitlement programs. In a 2012 opinion piece, journalist Matthew Miller recounted that as a senator, Simpson advised the nation's youth to collectively advocate for government reforms through an interest group. He continued to advocate for fiscal responsibility as a board member of the Committee for a Responsible Federal Budget and founder of the Campaign to Fix the Debt.

Simpson in a 2011 CRFB dinner discussion with Judy Woodruff and Erskine Bowles

=== Campaign finance reform ===
Simpson was a strong critic of the US Supreme Court's 2010 ruling in Citizens United v. FEC, calling for an amendment to the Constitution of the United States to overturn the Supreme Court's decision in the case. In an interview with Wyoming Public Radio, Simpson said: "I think most Americans would like to see reasonable limits on campaign spending." In 2016, he joined the advisory board of American Promise, a national, cross-partisan organization that advocates for a 28th Amendment to the US Constitution that would allow Congress and state governments to set limits on campaign finance in U.S. elections.

=== LGBTQ rights ===
Simpson supported LGBTQ rights throughout his life. In 2001, Simpson became Honorary Chairman of the Republican Unity Coalition (RUC), a gay/straight alliance within the Republican Party. In that capacity, Simpson recruited former President Gerald Ford to serve on the RUC advisory board. In a 2007 Washington Post article, Simpson criticized the "Don't ask, don't tell" policy, stating that "'Gay' is an artificial category that says little about a person. Our differences and prejudices pale next to our historic challenge." The policy was ultimately ended in 2011.

=== Civic participation ===
Simpson was on the board of directors at the National Institute for Civil Discourse (NICD). The institute was created at the University of Arizona after the shooting of U.S House of Representatives member Gabby Giffords from Arizona. He was an honorary board member of the humanitarian organization Wings of Hope and co-chair of the advisory board of Issue One, a nonprofit organization that seeks to reduce the role of money in politics.

== Personal life and death ==
In 1954, Simpson married the former Susan Ann Schroll, who he had met while studying at the University of Wyoming. Together, they had three children named William Simpson, Colin M. Simpson, and Susan Gallagher.

Simpson's health declined after contracting frostbite in his late eighties, which led to the amputation of his lower left leg and foot. In December 2024, he had broken a hip and never fully recovered, which led to his death under hospice care in Cody, Wyoming, on March 14, 2025 at age 93.

== In popular culture ==
The June 7, 1994, edition of the supermarket tabloid Weekly World News reported that twelve senators were aliens of extraterrestrial life from other planets, including Simpson. The Associated Press ran a follow-up piece which confirmed the tongue-in-cheek participation of Senate offices in the story. Then-Senator Simpson's spokesman Charles Pelkey, when asked about Simpson's galactic origins, told the AP: "We've got only one thing to say: Klaatu barada nikto," quoting the science fiction film The Day the Earth Stood Still (1951), in which an alien arrives in Washington, D.C. by flying saucer.

In December 2012, Simpson filmed a "Gangnam Style" video for a campaign, with a man in a tin can costume. The video, aimed at young people, is called "The Can Kicks Back," a reference to the tendencies of Congress to "kick the can down the road" instead of making difficult decisions about lowering the government debt. In the video, Simpson admonishes younger Americans to make better use of their social media than "instagramming your breakfast and tweeting your first world problems." He advises younger people to use their social media skills and resources to rally their friends to join The Can Kicks Back. If younger Americans do not take heed, Simpson advised, "These old coots will clean out the Treasury before you get there."

== Recognition ==
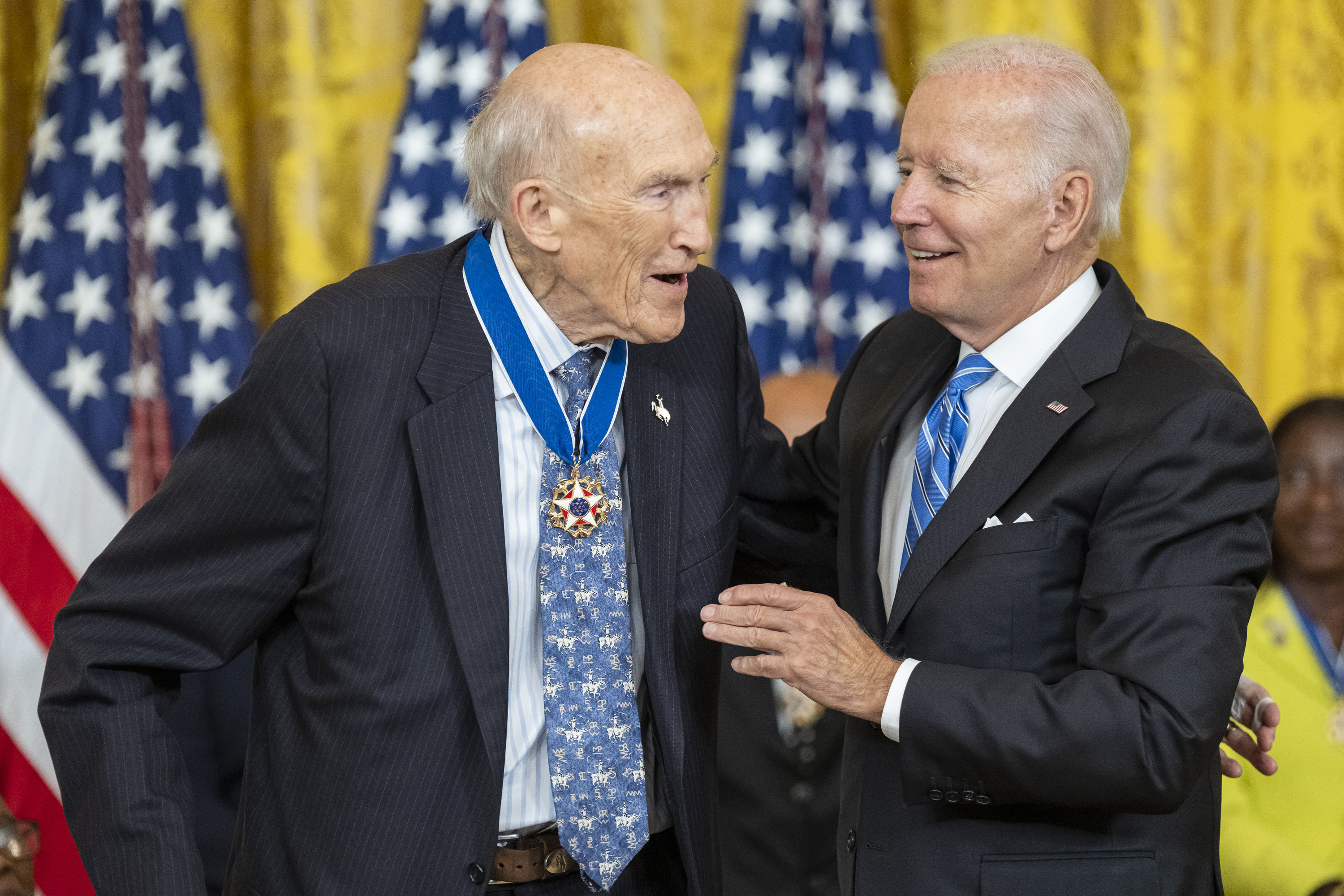
Simpson awarded the Presidential Medal of Freedom by President Joe Biden in July 2022

In 1998, Simpson received the Golden Plate Award of the American Academy of Achievement. In 2011, Simpson and Erskine Bowles were presented the Paul H. Douglas Award for Ethics in Government for their work on the National Commission on Fiscal Responsibility and Reform. In 2022 Simpson was awarded the Presidential Medal of Freedom in a ceremony at the White House.

== Works ==
- Right in the Old Gazoo: A Lifetime of Scrapping with the Press. (William Morrow & Company, 1997). ISBN 0-688-11358-3.

Party political offices
Preceded by Clifford Hansen	Republican nominee for U.S. Senator from Wyoming (Class 2); 1978, 1984, 1990	Succeeded by Mike Enzi
Preceded by Ted Stevens	Senate Republican Whip; 1985–1995	Succeeded by Trent Lott
U.S. Senate
Preceded by Clifford Hansen	United States Senator (Class 2) from Wyoming; 1979–1997; Served alongside: Malcolm Wallop, Craig Thomas	Succeeded by Mike Enzi
Preceded by Alan Cranston	Chair of the Senate Veterans' Affairs Committee; 1981–1985	Succeeded by Frank Murkowski
Preceded by Ted Stevens	Senate Majority Whip; 1985–1987	Succeeded by Alan Cranston
Preceded by Alan Cranston	Senate Minority Whip; 1987–1995	Succeeded by Wendell Ford
Preceded by Jay Rockefeller	Chair of the Senate Veterans' Affairs Committee; 1995–1997	Succeeded by Arlen Specter
Government offices
New office	Chair of the National Commission on Fiscal Responsibility and Reform; 2010; Served alongside: Erskine Bowles	Position abolished
