= Peg Shreve =

American politician

Member of the Wyoming House of Representatives
- In office January 9, 1979 – January 12, 1999
- Succeeded by: Colin M. Simpson
- Constituency: Park County (1979-1992); 24th district (1993-1999)

Personal details
- Born: July 23, 1927 Spencer, West Virginia, U.S.
- Died: October 27, 2012 (aged 85) Cody, Wyoming, U.S.
- Party: Republican

Peg Shreve (July 23, 1927 – October 27, 2012) was an American politician who served in the Wyoming House of Representatives from 1979 to 1999. She represented Park County from 1979 to 1992, and the represented the 24th district from 1993 to 1999.

She died on October 27, 2012, in Cody, Wyoming at age 85.
