= Larry Clapp =

American lawyer and politician

Larry R. Clapp
- Born: October 4, 1946; Casper, Wyoming, U.S.
- Died: January 7, 2013 (aged 66); Casper, Wyoming, U.S.
- Body discovered: Crossroads Park
- Education: University of Wyoming (BA); University of Wyoming Law School (JD)
- Occupation: lawyer
- Years active: 1973–2013
- Employer(s): Clapp and Associates
- Term: 1978–1979
- Political party: Democratic

Larry R. Clapp (October 4, 1946 – January 7, 2013) was an American lawyer and politician.

Clapp served in the Wyoming House of Representatives, as a Democrat, in 1978–1979, on the Casper, Wyoming city council and as mayor in 1988. He practiced law.

On October 3, 2012, Clapp was arrested after a months-long investigation after his IP address was flagged as possibly having accessed child pornography on the internet. Authorities obtained a search warrant and found over 100 movie files related to child pornography on his computer's hard drive, as well as on an external drive. His attorney waived a preliminary hearing in November and was expected to file status reports, along with the district attorney, on January 4, 2013. On January 7, Clapp was found dead from an apparent self-inflicted gunshot wound at Crossroads Park in Casper, Wyoming.
