= Jim Arroyo =

U.S. militiaman

- Employer: U.S. Army
- Organization(s): Oath Keepers (vice president), Yavapai County Preparedness Team (founder)

Jim Arroyo is an American retired U.S. Army Ranger, Oath Keeper leader and founder of the Yavapai County Preparedness Team.

== Career ==
Arroyo worked as a U.S. Army Ranger, as a gunsmith and as a survival instructor. Arroyo was the vice president of the Arizona chapter of the far-right militia the Oath Keepers in 2021 and 2022.

He is the founder of the Yavapai County Preparedness Team. In 2022 he designed and led an effort to surveil ballot boxes in Arizona, in a program he named Operation: Drop Box. He stopped the efforts after his organisation was named in a lawsuit by the League of Women Voters and accused of voter intimidation and breaking the Voting Rights Act.

== Views ==
In 2021, Arroyo appeared on CBS television show 60 Minutes and was interviewed by Sharyn Alfonsi. On the show he spoke of the Oath Keeper's collaboration with U.S. police and was critical of Oath Keepers leader Stewart Rhodes. Arroyo said that he does not accept the results of the 2020 United States presidential election, nor did he support the January 6 United States Capitol attack.

Arroyo frequently appeared on the YouTube channel of Prescott eNews. Video titles include "The Coming Civil War? Part 2."
