= Matt Mead =

Governor of Wyoming from 2011 to 2019

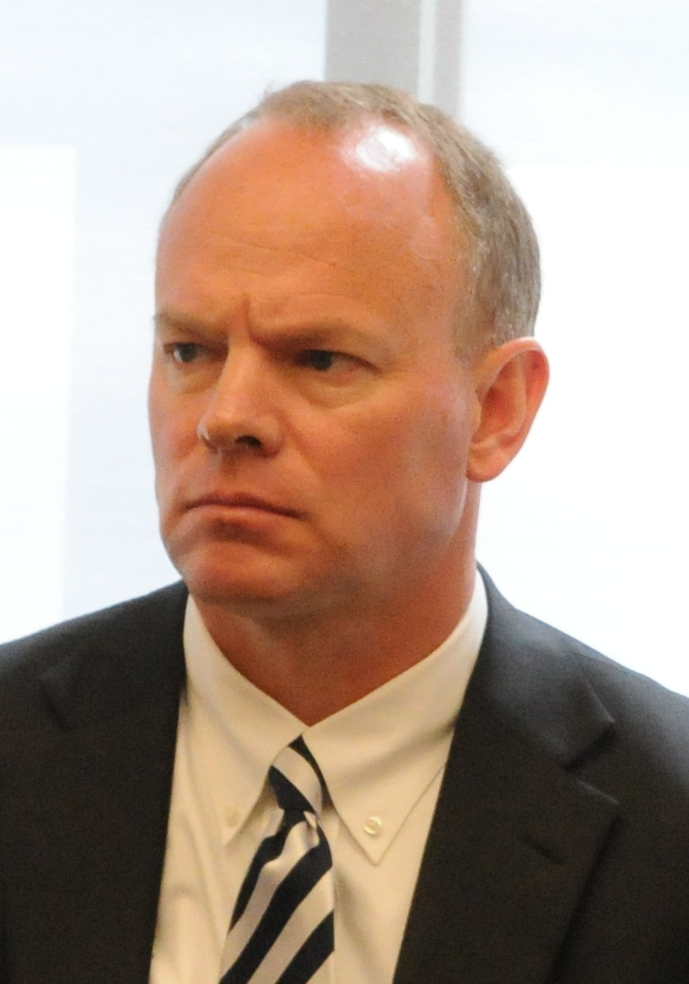
- Mead in 2011

32nd Governor of Wyoming
- In office January 3, 2011 – January 7, 2019
- Preceded by: Dave Freudenthal
- Succeeded by: Mark Gordon

United States Attorney for the District of Wyoming
- In office October 12, 2001 – June 7, 2007
- President: George W. Bush
- Preceded by: Dave Freudenthal
- Succeeded by: Kelly H. Rankin

Personal details
- Born: Matthew Hansen Mead; March 11, 1962 (age 64) Jackson, Wyoming, U.S.
- Party: Republican
- Spouse: Carol Mead
- Children: 2
- Relatives: Mary Mead (mother); Clifford Hansen (grandfather)
- Education: Trinity University, Texas (BA); University of Wyoming (JD)

Matthew Hansen Mead (born March 11, 1962) is an American attorney, businessman, and politician who served as the 32nd governor of Wyoming from 2011 to 2019. A member of the Republican Party, he previously was the United States Attorney for the District of Wyoming from 2001 to 2007.

== Early life and career ==
Mead, the son of Peter Bradford Mead and Mary Elisabeth Hansen Mead, was born and raised in Jackson, Wyoming. Mead graduated in 1984 with a bachelor's degree in radio/television from Trinity University in San Antonio, Texas where he was a member of the Bengal Lancer fraternity among other pursuits. He earned a J.D. degree from the University of Wyoming College of Law at Laramie. After law school, he served as a county and federal prosecutor and also practiced in a private law firm.

== U.S. Attorney ==
In 2001, Mead was appointed United States Attorney for the District of Wyoming by President George W. Bush. He served until June 2007, when he resigned to seek the Senate seat vacated by the death of fellow Republican Craig L. Thomas. His resignation was required under the Hatch Act of 1939.

In accordance with Wyoming state law, the Republican Party selected the three candidates from which Democratic governor Dave Freudenthal could make his selection. On the third ballot, the Republican State Central Committee, by fourteen votes, eliminated Mead from consideration. Freudenthal chose State Senator John Barrasso; the others he considered were former State Treasurer Cynthia Lummis of Cheyenne and former Republican State Chairman and lobbyist Tom Sansonetti, who had been an aide to Thomas.

== Governor ==
=== 2010 election ===
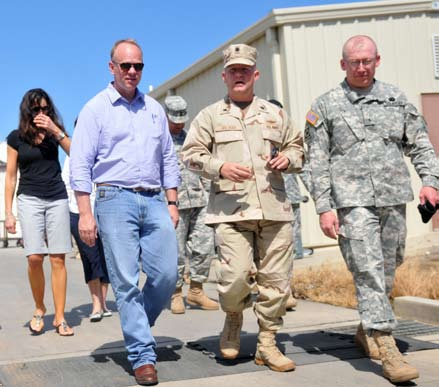
Mead visiting Guantanamo Bay detention camp in 2011

In 2010, Mead won the Republican gubernatorial primary with 30,272 votes, defeating State Auditor Rita Meyer, who polled 29,558 votes, despite Meyer's endorsement by former Alaska governor Sarah Palin. Fort Bridger rancher Ron Micheli finished third (27,592 votes) and State House Speaker Colin M. Simpson was fourth (16,673 votes).

With Freudenthal not running for a third term, because of term limits, Mead was a heavy favorite in the general election; Wyoming is heavily Republican.

Mead's campaign emphasized his support for gun rights. He opposed gay marriage and abortion, but stated that there should be exceptions to allow an abortion when the woman's health or life is at stake and in cases of rape and incest. On November 2, 2010, Mead easily defeated Leslie Petersen, the former chairwoman of the Wyoming Democratic Party, receiving 65.68% of the vote to Petersen's 22.94%.

=== 2014 election ===
In late January 2013, Wyoming Superintendent of Public Instruction Cindy Hill, a Republican, announced that she would be a candidate in Wyoming's 2014 governor's race. A Tea Party favorite, Hill would face Mead in the Republican primary on August 19, 2014. Earlier in January, Mead had signed legislation sharply reducing the responsibilities of Hill's office, making the position largely ceremonial.

Mead handily won re-nomination in the 2014 Republican primary, with 53,626 votes (55 percent), compared to Dr. Taylor Haynes' 31,490 (32 percent), and Hill's 12,443 (13 percent). In the November 4 general election, Mead handily defeated Pete Gosar, the former Democratic Party state chairman and the brother of a Republican U.S. representative from Arizona, Paul Gosar. In the same election, Republican Jillian Balow, backed by Mead, won election to succeed Hill as the education superintendent.

=== Administration ===
On October 26, 2012, Mead named Buffalo, Wyoming, businessman and rancher Mark Gordon as the state treasurer, to succeed Joseph B. Meyer, who died in office.

On February 17, 2015, Mead vetoed legislation intended to prevent the state from permanently confiscating an individual's property through civil forfeiture until after a felony conviction had been attained. The legislation, Senate File 14, gained strong popular support and passed through the Wyoming Legislature, with majorities in excess of 2/3 in both houses. An attempt to override the veto failed.

== Personal life ==
Mead has an older brother, Bradford Scott "Brad" Mead, a Jackson attorney, and an older sister, Muffy Mead-Ferro of Salt Lake City, the author of Confessions of a Slacker Mom.

Mead's mother, Mary Mead, was the GOP gubernatorial nominee in 1990. Considered an expert horsewoman, she died in 1996, on her 61st birthday, in a horseback accident while working cattle in Grand Teton National Park. In 2003, Mead and his brother and sister put their family ranch in the park up for sale; the price was said to be $110 million.

Mead's paternal aunt, Andrea Mead Lawrence, was an alpine ski racer who competed in three Winter Olympic Games and won two gold medals for the United States.

Mead and his wife Carol have two children.

== Electoral history ==
Wyoming Gubernatorial Republican primary results. 2010
Party	Candidate	Votes	%
Republican	Matt Mead	30,308	28.7
Republican	Rita Meyer	29,605	28.0
Republican	Ron Micheli	27,630	26.1
Republican	Colin Simpson	16,722	15.8
Republican	Alan Kousoulos	566	0.5
Republican	Tom Ubben	432	0.4
Republican	John Self	295	0.3
Republican	Write-ins	202	0.2
Total votes		105,760	100

Wyoming gubernatorial election, 2010
Party	Candidate	Votes	%	±%
Republican	Matt Mead	123,780	65.68%	+35.67%
Democratic	Leslie Petersen	43,240	22.94%	−47.05%
Independent	Taylor Haynes	13,796	7.32%	
Libertarian	Mike Wheeler	5,362	2.85%	
Write-ins		2,285	1.21%	
Majority		80,540	42.74%	+2.75%
Turnout		190,822		
Republican gain from Democratic		Swing		

Wyoming Gubernatorial Republican primary results. 2014
Party	Candidate	Votes	%
Republican	Matt Mead (incumbent)	53,673	54.04
Republican	Taylor Haynes	31,532	31.75
Republican	Cindy Hill	12,464	12.55
Republican	Write-in	215	0.22
Republican	Over Votes	26	0.03
Republican	Under Votes	1,402	1.41
Total votes		99,312	100

Wyoming gubernatorial election, 2014
Party	Candidate	Votes	%	±%
Republican	Matt Mead (incumbent)	99,700	58.25	−7.43%
Democratic	Pete Gosar	45,752	26.73	3.79%
Independent	Don Wills	9,895	5.78	
Libertarian	Dee Cozzens	4,040	2.36	−0.49%
Write-in	Other	8,490	4.96	
Over Votes	Other	62	0.04	
Under Votes	Other	3,214	1.88	
Majority		53,948	31.52	−11.52%
Total votes		171,153	100	
Republican hold		Swing		

Party political offices
Preceded by Ray Hunkins	Republican nominee for Governor of Wyoming; 2010, 2014	Succeeded by Mark Gordon
Political offices
Preceded by Dave Freudenthal	Governor of Wyoming; 2011–2019	Succeeded by Mark Gordon
U.S. order of precedence (ceremonial)
Preceded by Dave Freudenthal as Former Governor	Order of precedence of the United States; Within Wyoming	Succeeded by Jack Markell as Former Governor
Preceded by Dave Freudenthal as Former Governor	Order of precedence of the United States; Outside Wyoming	Succeeded by Jon Huntsman Jr. as Former Governor
