= Rita Meyer =

American politician

Rita C. Meyer

26th Wyoming State Auditor
- In office January 3, 2007 – January 3, 2011
- Governor: Dave Freudenthal
- Preceded by: Max Maxfield
- Succeeded by: Cynthia Cloud

Personal details
- Born: 1951 (age 74–75) Johnstown, Nebraska, U.S.
- Party: Republican
- Spouse: Leo Meyer
- Children: 1
- Education: University of Wyoming; Regis University; National Defense University

Military service
- Allegiance: United States of America
- Branch/service: Wyoming Air National Guard
- Rank: Colonel
- Battles/wars: Desert Storm; Operation Enduring Freedom

Rita C. Meyer (born 1951) is an American politician who served as Wyoming State Auditor from 2007 to 2011. Instead of seeking a second term as auditor in 2010, Meyer ran unsuccessfully as a candidate in the 2010 Wyoming gubernatorial election. She lost by approximately 700 votes, garnering 29,605 votes to fellow Republican Matt Mead's 30,308 in the primary election held on August 17, 2010.

== Early life and education ==
Meyer lived near Johnstown in Brown County in northern Nebraska. In 1977, the family moved to Centennial, Wyoming. Meyer attended the University of Wyoming and holds an MBA from Regis University in Denver, Colorado, and a Master's in National Resource Strategy from National Defense University in Washington, D.C.

== Professional career ==
From 1998 to 2002, Meyer was the Chief of Staff to Wyoming Governor Jim Geringer. She also served on the University of Wyoming Board of Trustees and as head of the Service Academy Nomination Committee for Senator Malcolm Wallop.

== Military career ==
Meyer served for more than twenty-three years as an enlisted airwoman and officer in the Wyoming Air National Guard, having attained the rank of full colonel in July 2004. She is a combat veteran of both Desert Storm and Operation Enduring Freedom. Her final overseas assignment was as a Mission Support Group Commander at Bagram Airfield, Afghanistan. She retired from the military in November 2007.

She also served as an admissions liaison officer to the United States Air Force Academy and the Reserve Officers' Training Corps.

== Awards and recognition ==
Meyer has received the award of Outstanding Alumnus from both the University of Wyoming College of Business and the College of Education, the Legion of Merit, the Order of the Bayonet, and the Order of St. Barbara.

== Personal life ==
Meyer was married to Dr. Charles Meyer, a native of Rawlins, Wyoming, from 1977 until his death in 2011. The couple had one son, Charles Stoddard Meyer, daughter-in-law, Jennifer, and grandchildren, Augusta Grace and John Charles Meyer of Ellicott City, MD. Meyer married Stephen Joseph Miller of Cheyenne in 2018.

Political offices
| Preceded by Max Maxfield | State Auditor of Wyoming; 2007—2011 | Succeeded by Cynthia Cloud |
