= 2010 Wyoming gubernatorial election =

- November 2, 2010
- Turnout: 69.78% Registered ▼3.82% 38.17% of Total Population ▼1.04%
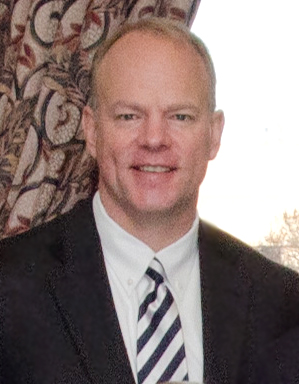

Nominee	Matt Mead	Leslie Petersen	Taylor Haynes
Party	Republican	Democratic	Independent
Popular vote	123,780	43,240	13,796
Percentage	65.68%	22.94%	7.32%
- County results Mead: 50–60% 60–70% 70–80%
Governor before election
Dave Freudenthal
Democratic
Elected Governor
Matt Mead
Republican

The 2010 Wyoming gubernatorial election was held on Tuesday, November 2, 2010, to elect the governor of Wyoming. Party primaries were held on August 17.

While it was initially thought that term limits would prevent incumbent Democratic governor Dave Freudenthal from running for re-election, the constitutionality of the term limit law has been questioned, leaving the possibility that if Freudenthal had successfully challenged the law, he might have been able to run for a third term. On March 4, 2010, Freudenthal announced he would not run for a third term.

Republican Matt Mead flipped every county from Democratic to Republican as he won by getting around two-thirds of the votes polled.

== Democratic primary ==
=== Candidates ===
==== Declared ====
- Pete Gosar, teacher, commercial pilot, state employee and small business owner, brother of Rep. Paul Gosar (R-AZ)
- Al Hamburg, retired painter and perennial candidate
- Leslie Petersen, former Teton County Commissioner and Chair of the Wyoming Democratic Party
- Rex Wilde, cabinet maker
- Chris Zachary, former psychiatrist

==== Declined ====
- Larry Clapp, attorney and former mayor of Casper
- Dave Freudenthal, incumbent governor (Term Limited but there was speculation that he might challenge the law)
- Paul Hickey, attorney
- Mike Massie, State Senator (ran for Superintendent of Public Instruction)

=== Polling ===
Poll source	Dates administered	Leslie Petersen	Pete Gosar	Al Hamburg	Chris Zachary	Rex Wilde	Undecided
WTE/Aspen Media & Market Research	July 26–29, 2010	34%	9%	5%	1%	4%	39%
Casper Star Tribune	July 26–28, 2010	30%	22%	2%	1%	<1%	45%

=== Results ===
Results by county: Peterson: Peterson—80–90%; Peterson—50–60%; Peterson—40–50%; Gosar: Gosar—<40%; Gosar—40–50%; Gosar—50–60%; Gosar—60–70%

Democratic primary results
Party	Candidate	Votes	%
Democratic	Leslie Petersen	10,785	47.2
Democratic	Pete Gosar	8,409	36.8
Democratic	Chris Zachary	1,139	5.0
Democratic	Al Hamburg	1,092	4.8
Democratic	Rex Wilde	1,042	4.6
Democratic	write-ins	384	1.7
Total votes		22,851	100

== Republican primary ==
=== Candidates ===
- Alan Kousoulos, 19-year WYDOT supervisor
- Matt Mead, former U.S. attorney
- Rita Meyer, Wyoming state auditor
- Ron Micheli, former state representative and former director of the Wyoming Department of Agriculture
- John Self, candidate for governor in 2002 and 2006
- Colin M. Simpson, Speaker of the Wyoming House of Representatives
- Tom Ubben

=== Polling ===
Poll source	Dates administered	Rita Meyer	Matt Mead	Colin Simpson	Ron Micheli	Alan Kousoulos	Undecided
WTE/Aspen Media & Market Research	July 26–29, 2010	23%	18%	10%	20%	1%	25%
Casper Star-Tribune	July 26–28, 2010	27%	24%	17%	12%	2%	18%

=== Results ===
Results by county: Mead: Mead—50–60%; Mead—40–50%; Mead—<40%; Meyer: Meyer—<40%; Micheli: Micheli—<40%; Micheli—50–60%; Micheli—60–70%; Simpson: Simpson—<40%

Republican primary results
Party	Candidate	Votes	%
Republican	Matt Mead	30,308	28.7
Republican	Rita Meyer	29,605	28.0
Republican	Ron Micheli	27,630	26.1
Republican	Colin Simpson	16,722	15.8
Republican	Alan Kousoulos	566	0.5
Republican	Tom Ubben	432	0.4
Republican	John Self	295	0.3
Republican	write-ins	202	0.2
Total votes		105,760	100

== General election ==
=== Candidates ===
- Matt Mead (R)
- Leslie Peterson (D)
- Mike Wheeler (L)
- Taylor Haynes (Write-in)

=== Predictions ===
Source	Ranking	As of
Cook Political Report	Safe R (flip)	October 14, 2010
Rothenberg	Safe R (flip)	October 28, 2010
RealClearPolitics	Safe R (flip)	November 1, 2010
Sabato's Crystal Ball	Safe R (flip)	October 28, 2010
CQ Politics	Safe R (flip)	October 28, 2010

=== Polling ===
Poll source	Dates administered	Matt Mead (R)	Leslie Petersen (D)
Rasmussen Reports	September 30, 2010	61%	25%
Rasmussen Reports	August 18, 2010	58%	24%
Rasmussen Reports	June 22, 2010	49%	22%

=== Results ===
2010 Wyoming gubernatorial election
Party	Candidate	Votes	%	±%
Republican	Matt Mead	123,780	65.68%	+35.67%
Democratic	Leslie Petersen	43,240	22.94%	−47.05%
Independent	Taylor Haynes	13,796	7.32%	
Libertarian	Mike Wheeler	5,362	2.85%	
Write-in		2,285	1.21%	
Majority		80,540	42.74%	+2.75%
Turnout		190,822		
Republican gain from Democratic		Swing		

==== By county ====
County	Matt Mead Republican		Leslie Petersen Democratic		Taylor Haynes Independent		All Others		Margin		Total
County	#	%	#	%	#	%	#	%	#	%	Total
Albany	6,374	55.6%	4,352	38.0%	309	2.7%	420	3.7%	2,022	17.6%	11,455
Big Horn	3,217	74.0%	613	14.1%	394	9.1%	124	2.9%	2,704	59.9%	4,348
Campbell	6,934	61.5%	1,179	10.5%	2,930	26.0%	231	2.0%	4,004	35.5% (Note: Compares margin over Haynes.)	11,274
Carbon	3,585	69.0%	1,308	25.2%	107	2.1%	196	3.8%	2,277	43.8%	5,196
Converse	3,202	64.8%	761	15.4%	827	16.7%	152	3.0%	2,375	48.1%	4,942
Crook	2,048	65.3%	388	12.4%	608	19.4%	93	3.0%	1,440	45.9%	3,137
Fremont	8,439	61.9%	3,323	24.4%	1,301	9.5%	575	4.2%	5,116	37.5%	13,638
Goshen	3,493	71.7%	893	18.3%	309	6.3%	176	3.6%	2,600	53.4%	4,871
Hot Springs	1,596	71.9%	401	18.1%	141	6.4%	82	3.7%	1,195	53.8%	2,220
Johnson	2,804	73.8%	578	15.2%	301	7.9%	114	3.0%	2,226	58.6%	3,797
Laramie	19,323	64.7%	7,507	25.1%	819	2.7%	2,235	7.5%	11,816	39.6%	29,884
Lincoln	4,710	71.6%	1,023	15.5%	592	9.0%	257	3.9%	3,687	56.1%	6,582
Natrona	15,077	65.2%	5,761	24.9%	1,470	6.4%	829	3.6%	9,316	40.3%	23,137
Niobrara	753	65.4%	124	10.8%	243	21.1%	32	2.8%	510	44.3%	1,152
Park	8,312	72.4%	1,813	15.8%	955	8.3%	398	3.4%	6,499	56.6%	11,478
Platte	2,303	60.2%	905	23.6%	500	13.1%	119	3.1%	1,398	36.6%	3,827
Sheridan	7,632	71.4%	2,336	21.9%	426	4.0%	290	2.7%	5,296	49.5%	10,684
Sublette	2,465	71.4%	554	16.1%	335	9.7%	97	2.8%	1,911	55.3%	3,451
Sweetwater	8,218	65.5%	3,532	28.1%	305	2.4%	495	3.9%	4,686	37.4%	12,550
Teton	4,407	51.6%	3,856	45.1%	78	0.9%	207	2.4%	551	6.5%	8,548
Uinta	4,462	73.7%	1,075	17.8%	221	3.7%	295	4.9%	3,387	55.9%	6,053
Washakie	2,574	75.4%	597	17.5%	135	4.0%	109	3.2%	1,977	57.9%	3,415
Weston	1,852	65.6%	361	12.8%	490	17.4%	121	4.3%	1,362	48.2%	2,824
Totals	123,780	65.7%	43,240	22.9%	13,796	7.3%	7,647	4.0%	80,540	42.8%	188,463

Counties that flipped from Democratic to Republican

- All 23
