= 2008 United States Senate election in Wyoming =

- November 4, 2008
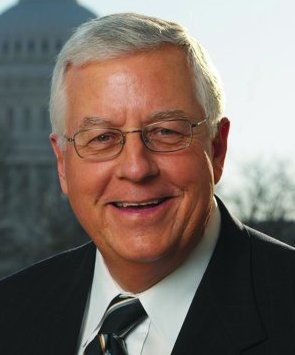

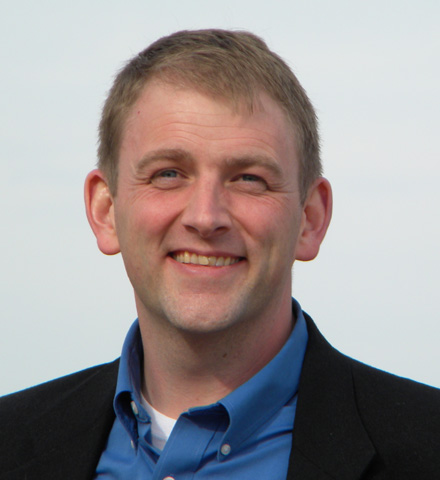
| Nominee | Mike Enzi | Chris Rothfuss |
| Party | Republican | Democratic |
| Popular vote | 189,046 | 60,631 |
| Percentage | 75.63% | 24.26% |
- Enzi: 50–60% 60–70% 70–80% 80–90% >90% Rothfuss: 50–60% 60–70% Tie: 50% No votes
U.S. senator before election
Mike Enzi
Republican
Elected U.S. senator
Mike Enzi
Republican

The 2008 United States Senate election in Wyoming was held on November 4, 2008, to elect a member of the United States Senate to represent the state of Wyoming. Republican incumbent Mike Enzi won re-election to a third term, defeating Democratic nominee Chris Rothfuss.

In the August 19 primary elections, Enzi secured the Republican nomination unopposed. Rothfuss defeated Al Hamburg, a perennial candidate, in the Democratic primary with 62% of the vote.

== Background ==
Wyoming voted for Republican nominee George W. Bush in the 2004 presidential election by a 40-point margin—the state last voted for the Democratic presidential nominee in the 1964 election. Senator Enzi, first elected in 1996, was reelected in 2002 by a 46-point margin.

== Republican primary ==
=== Candidates ===
==== Nominee ====
- Mike Enzi, incumbent U.S. senator (1997–2021)

=== Results ===
Republican primary results
| Party | Candidate | Votes | % |
|---|---|---|---|
| Republican | Mike Enzi (incumbent) | 69,195 | 100.00 |
| Total votes | | 69,195 | 100.00 |

== Democratic primary ==
=== Candidates ===
==== Nominee ====
- Chris Rothfuss, university professor

==== Eliminated in primary ====
- Al Hamburg, perennial candidate

=== Endorsements ===
Chris Rothfuss

Newspapers

- Wyoming Tribune-Eagle

=== Results ===
Democratic primary results
| Party | Candidate | Votes | % |
|---|---|---|---|
| Democratic | Chris Rothfuss | 14,221 | 62.38 |
| Democratic | Al Hamburg | 8,578 | 37.62 |
| Total votes | | 22,799 | 100.00 |

== General election ==
=== Predictions ===
| Source | Ranking | As of |
|---|---|---|
| The Cook Political Report | Solid R | October 23, 2008 |
| Congressional Quarterly | Safe R | October 31, 2008 |
| Rothenberg Political Report | Safe R | November 2, 2008 |
| Sabato's Crystal Ball | Solid R | November 4, 2008 |

=== Post-primary endorsements ===
Mike Enzi (R)

Executive branch officials

- Dick Cheney, 46th vice president of the United States (2001–2009)

Newspapers

- Casper Star-Tribune
- Wyoming Tribune-Eagle
Declined to endorse

Statewide officials

- David Freudenthal, governor of Wyoming (2003–2011) (Democratic)

=== Fundraising ===
Campaign finance reports as of December 31, 2008
| Candidate | Raised | Spent | Cash on hand |
|---|---|---|---|
| Mike Enzi (R) | $2,369,093 | $2,129,834 | $581,791 |
| Chris Rothfuss (D) | $32,326 | $27,258 | $5,266 |
Source: Federal Election Commission

=== Polling ===
| Poll source | Date(s) administered | Sample size (Note: Key: A – all adults RV – registered voters LV – likely voters V – unclear) | Margin of error | Mike Enzi (R) | Chris Rothfuss (D) | Undecided |
|---|---|---|---|---|---|---|
| Research 2000 (Note: Poll sponsored by Daily Kos) | October 14–16, 2008 | 500 (LV) | ± 4.5% | 61% | 34% | 5% |
| Mason-Dixon Polling & Strategy (Note: Poll commissioned by the Casper Star-Tribune) | October 13–14, 2008 | 625 (LV) | ± 4.0% | 72% | 20% | 8% |
| Research 2000 | September 22–24, 2008 | 500 (LV) | ± 4.5% | 59% | 35% | 6% |

== Results ==
2008 United States Senate election in Wyoming
| Party | Candidate | Votes | % | ±% |
|---|---|---|---|---|
| Republican | Mike Enzi (incumbent) | 189,046 | 75.63 | +2.68 |
| Democratic | Chris Rothfuss | 60,631 | 24.26 | −2.79 |
| Write-in | | 269 | 0.11 | N/A |
| Total votes | | 249,946 | 100.00 | N/A |
| Republican hold | | | | |

=== By county ===
| County | Mike Enzi Republican | | Chris Rothfuss Democratic | | Write-in | | Margin | | Total votes cast |
| County | # | % | # | % | # | % | # | % | Total votes cast |
|---|---|---|---|---|---|---|---|---|---|
| Albany | 10,481 | 62.85% | 6,170 | 37.00% | 25 | 0.15% | 4,311 | 25.85% | 16,676 |
| Big Horn | 4,590 | 86.96% | 682 | 12.92% | 6 | 0.11% | 3,908 | 74.04% | 5,278 |
| Campbell | 14,191 | 87.90% | 1,938 | 12.00% | 16 | 0.10% | 12,253 | 75.90% | 16,145 |
| Carbon | 4,951 | 73.69% | 1,760 | 26.19% | 8 | 0.12% | 3,191 | 47.50% | 6,719 |
| Converse | 5,393 | 84.46% | 990 | 15.51% | 2 | 0.03% | 4,403 | 68.95% | 6,385 |
| Crook | 3,202 | 87.80% | 437 | 11.98% | 8 | 0.22% | 2,765 | 75.82% | 3,647 |
| Fremont | 12,927 | 75.36% | 4,212 | 24.55% | 15 | 0.09% | 8,715 | 50.81% | 17,154 |
| Goshen | 4,603 | 79.16% | 1,210 | 20.81% | 2 | 0.03% | 3,393 | 58.35% | 5,815 |
| Hot Springs | 2,097 | 83.12% | 423 | 16.77% | 3 | 0.12% | 1,674 | 66.35% | 2,523 |
| Johnson | 3,733 | 86.43% | 577 | 13.36% | 9 | 0.21% | 3,156 | 73.07% | 4,319 |
| Laramie | 28,871 | 70.83% | 11,845 | 29.06% | 44 | 0.11% | 17,026 | 41.77% | 40,760 |
| Lincoln | 7,001 | 82.92% | 1,430 | 16.94% | 12 | 0.14% | 5,571 | 65.98% | 8,443 |
| Natrona | 24,724 | 75.83% | 7,848 | 24.07% | 34 | 0.10% | 16,876 | 51.76% | 32,606 |
| Niobrara | 1,107 | 86.21% | 177 | 13.79% | 0 | 0.00% | 930 | 72.42% | 1,284 |
| Park | 12,105 | 81.98% | 2,645 | 17.91% | 16 | 0.11% | 9,460 | 64.07% | 14,766 |
| Platte | 3,418 | 75.55% | 1,104 | 24.40% | 2 | 0.04% | 2,314 | 51.15% | 4,524 |
| Sheridan | 11,674 | 78.96% | 3,105 | 21.00% | 6 | 0.04% | 8,569 | 57.96% | 14,785 |
| Sublette | 3,555 | 83.77% | 680 | 16.02% | 9 | 0.21% | 2,875 | 67.75% | 4,244 |
| Sweetwater | 11,479 | 69.83% | 4,937 | 30.03% | 22 | 0.13% | 6,542 | 30.80% | 16,438 |
| Teton | 6,348 | 52.85% | 5,423 | 46.00% | 18 | 0.15% | 925 | 6.85% | 11,789 |
| Uinta | 6,305 | 76.41% | 1,941 | 23.52% | 6 | 0.07% | 4,364 | 52.89% | 8,252 |
| Washakie | 3,427 | 84.97% | 602 | 14.93% | 4 | 0.10% | 2,825 | 70.04% | 4,033 |
| Weston | 2,864 | 85.21% | 495 | 14.73% | 2 | 0.06% | 2,369 | 70.48% | 3,361 |
| Totals | 189,046 | 75.63% | 60,631 | 24.26% | 269 | 0.11% | 128,415 | 51.37% | 249,946 |

== See also ==
- 2008 United States elections
- 2008 United States House of Representatives election in Wyoming

== Notes ==
Partisan and media clients

== Works cited ==
=== Election reports ===
- Republican Statewide Candidates Official Summary | Wyoming Primary Election - August 19, 2008 (PDF) (Report). Wyoming Secretary of State. August 19, 2008. p. 1. Archived (PDF) from the original on May 27, 2023.
- Democratic Statewide Candidates Official Summary | Wyoming Primary Election - August 19, 2008 (PDF) (Report). Wyoming Secretary of State. August 19, 2008. p. 1. Archived (PDF) from the original on June 22, 2025.
- Statewide Candidates Official Summary | Wyoming General Election - November 4, 2008 (PDF) (Report). Wyoming Secretary of State. November 4, 2008. p. 2. Archived (PDF) from the original on December 21, 2016.

=== News ===
- Reilly, Daniel W. (April 28, 2008). "Enzi will seek reelection". Politico. Archived from the original on August 19, 2022.
- "UW instructor runs against Enzi". Associated Press. March 24, 2008 – via Casper Star-Tribune.
- Barron, Joan (February 10, 2008). "Race could be a 1994 rerun". Casper Star-Tribune. "Since perennial candidate Al Hamburg of Torrington decided to seek the Democratic nomination for the U.S. Senate..."
- "U.S. Senate, 6-year seat, Democrat recommendation". Wyoming Tribune-Eagle. August 18, 2008. Archived from the original on August 4, 2026.
- Joyce, Matt (November 1, 2008). "VP Cheney rallies Republicans in Laramie". Associated Press – via Casper Star-Tribune.
- Star-Tribune Editorial Board (November 2, 2008). "Effective Enzi has earned a third term". Casper Star-Tribune.
- "Editorial: Mike Enzi is quiet but effective in U.S. Senate". Wyoming Tribune-Eagle. November 3, 2008. Archived from the original on August 22, 2026.
- Barron, Joan (October 8, 2008). "Governor stumps for Obama". Casper Star-Tribune.
- "WY-AL: Still tied up". Daily Kos. October 17, 2008. Archived from the original on October 22, 2008.
- Miller, Jared (October 18, 2008). "Incumbent senators poll strongly". Casper Star-Tribune.
- "WY-AL, Pres Polling: Race Tightens for Trauner". Daily Kos. September 26, 2008. Archived from the original on September 28, 2008.

=== Web ===
- "Wyoming Presidential Election Voting History". 270toWin. Archived from the original on September 3, 2026.
- "2008 Senate Race Ratings". The Cook Political Report. Archived from the original on October 11, 2018.
- "Race Ratings Chart: Senate". Congressional Quarterly. Archived from the original on October 28, 2010.
- Gonzales, Nathan L. "2008 Senate ratings". Rothenberg Political Report. Archived from the original on July 5, 2017.
- "Senate Outlook for 2008 | Wyoming Races". Sabato's Crystal Ball. Archived from the original on July 15, 2010.
- "2008 Election United States Senate - Wyoming". Federal Election Commission.
