= Mike Enzi =

American politician (1944–2021)

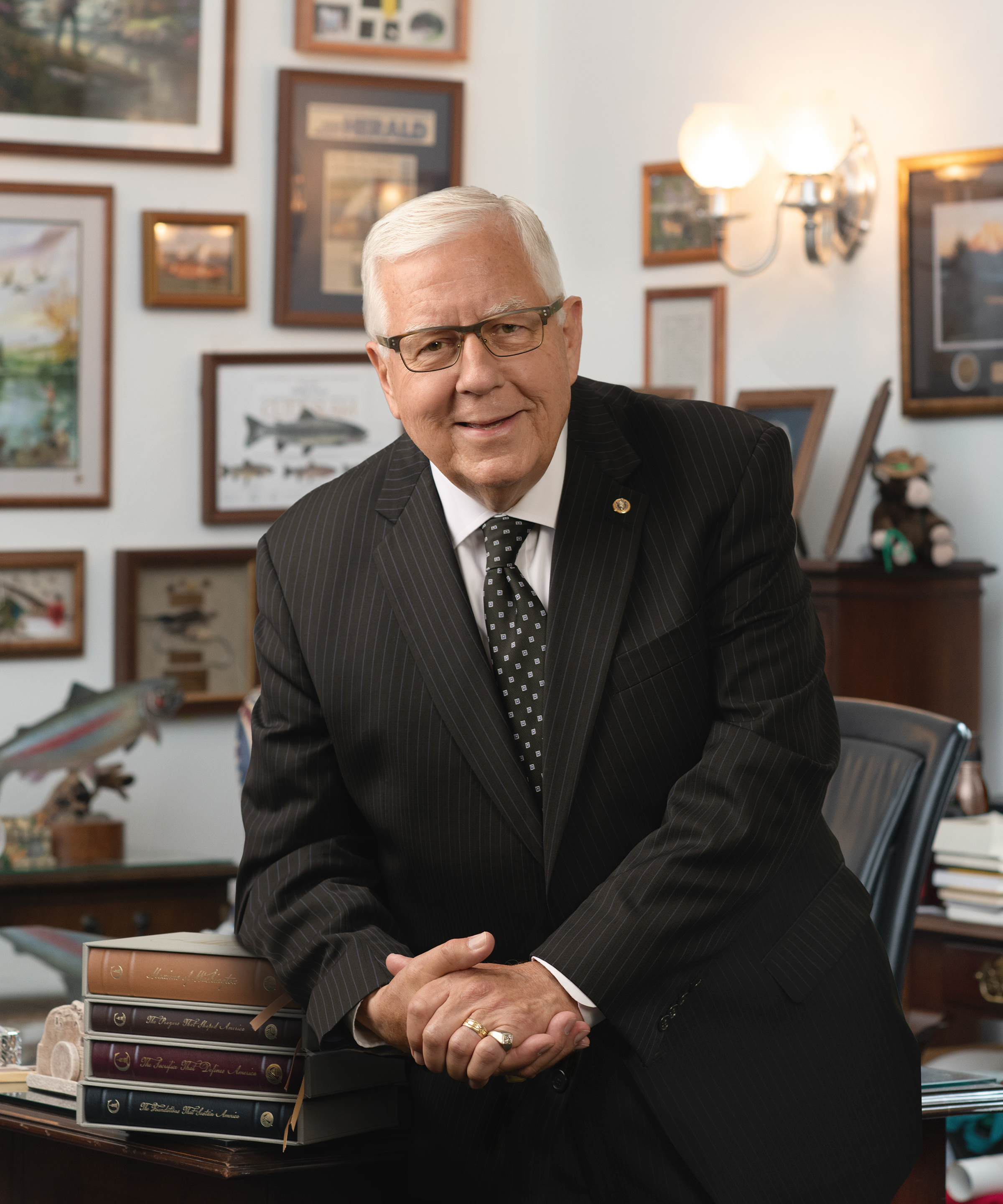
- Official portrait, 2018

United States Senator from Wyoming
- In office January 3, 1997 – January 3, 2021
- Preceded by: Alan Simpson
- Succeeded by: Cynthia Lummis

Member of the Wyoming Senate from the 24th district
- In office December 13, 1991 – January 3, 1997
- Preceded by: Kelly Mader
- Succeeded by: Richard Erb

Member of the Wyoming House of Representatives from the Campbell County district
- In office 1987–1991
- Preceded by: Multi-member district
- Succeeded by: David Shippy

Mayor of Gillette, Wyoming
- In office January 6, 1975 – January 1983
- Preceded by: Cliff Davis
- Succeeded by: Herb Carter

Personal details
- Born: Michael Bradley Enzi; February 1, 1944 Bremerton, Washington, U.S.
- Died: July 26, 2021 (aged 77) Loveland, Colorado, U.S.
- Party: Republican
- Spouse: Diana Buckley (m. 1969)
- Children: 3
- Education: George Washington University (BS); University of Denver (MBA)

Military service
- Allegiance: United States
- Branch/service: Air National Guard
- Years of service: 1967–1973
- Unit: Wyoming Air National Guard
- Enzi's voice Enzi on the FY2014 budget resolution at a Senate Budget Committee meeting Recorded March 13, 2013

Michael Bradley Enzi (/ˈɛnzi/ EN-zee; February 1, 1944 – July 26, 2021) was an American politician who served in the United States Senate from Wyoming, as a member of the Republican Party, from 1997 to 2021. Prior to his tenure in the United States Senate, he served as mayor of Gillette, Wyoming, in the Wyoming House of Representatives from Campbell County, and the Wyoming Senate from the 24th district. He was the third-longest-serving senator from Wyoming.

Enzi was born in Bremerton, Washington, and raised in Thermopolis and Sheridan, Wyoming. He was educated at Sheridan High School, George Washington University, and the University of Denver. He served in the Air National Guard, and held positions in the American Legion Boys State, DeMolay International, and United States Junior Chamber. He entered politics after being convinced by Alan Simpson to run for mayor of Gillette and defeating incumbent mayor Cliff Davis in 1974. He was elected to the state house in the 1986 election and served until his appointment to the state senate in 1991.

In the 1996 U.S. Senate election Enzi defeated future senator John Barrasso and other candidates in the Republican primary and Democratic nominee Kathy Karpan in the general election. He was ideologically conservative, but was also one of the most bipartisan Republicans in the U.S. Senate. Enzi served as chair or ranking member of the Health, Education, Labor and Pensions, and Budget committees. He declined to seek reelection in the 2020 election and was succeeded by Cynthia Lummis. He died in 2021 following injuries resulting from a bicycling accident.

== Early life and education ==
Michael Bradley Enzi was born in Bremerton, Washington, on February 1, 1944, to Elmer J. Enzi and Dorothy Bradley. Elmer and Dorothy married on August 31, 1942, and moved to Thermopolis, Wyoming, after Elmer was discharged from the United States Navy. Elmer opened a shoe store in Thermopolis before moving to Sheridan, Wyoming, in 1952, where he opened another shoe store in 1958. Enzi graduated from Sheridan High School in 1962, from George Washington University with a degree in accounting in 1966, and from the University of Denver with a Master of Business Administration in retail marketing in 1968.

Enzi was elected as a city councilor in the American Legion Boys State youth program, a leadership and citizenship programs for high school juniors, in 1961, and junior councilor in the Wyoming DeMolay International organization in 1963. In 1970, Enzi was appointed to serve as vice-chair of the Public Health Nursing Advisory Committee in Gillette, and elected president of the Wyoming United States Junior Chamber, a leadership training service organization, in 1973.

The Selective Service (American conscription system) reported that Enzi was in good health in 1963, and in 1966. Enzi applied to the Officer Candidate School (OCS) as a civilian in December 1966, but was rejected on January 6, 1967, due to glycosuria. Enzi joined the Wyoming Air National Guard after being rejected by the OCS and served from 1967 to 1973. In 1996, Enzi stated that he tried to enlist into active duty, but was ruled medically ineligible and joined the Air National Guard instead. Wyoming Veterans of Foreign Wars Commander Bill Saunders and Libertarian U.S. Senate candidate David Herbert questioned how he could serve in the National Guard if he was medically ineligible for active service. Enzi stated that he did not know why he was allowed to serve in the National Guard despite his medically ineligibility. He clarified that he was not seeking to equate his time in the Air National Guard with active duty service.

On June 7, 1969, Enzi married Diana Buckley and moved to Gillette, Wyoming a week later. The couple had three children. Buckley and Enzi opened NZ Shoes in Gillette, and opened two other locations in Sheridan and Miles City, Montana. He was an accounting manager, computer programmer, and safety trainer at Dunbar Well Service from 1985 to 1997.

== Career ==
=== Local politics ===
State representative Alan Simpson convinced Enzi to run for mayor of Gillette. He defeated incumbent mayor Cliff Davis in the 1974 election and was reelected without opposition in 1978. Stating that he was "not a career politician", Enzi declined to seek reelection on July 7, 1982.

Ed Geringer and Jack Babcock resigned within a month of each other in April and May 1976, leaving their two city council seats vacant. Geringer cited personal reasons for stepping down, while Babcock was moving out of the city. Enzi filled the vacancies with Jack Edmunds and Robert White respectively. Gillette's Planning and Zoning Commission was created in 1979, and Enzi appointed six of the seven positions on the board upon its creation. As mayor, Enzi approved the construction of a pipeline bringing water from Moorcroft, Wyoming; water was rationed in Gillette prior to the pipeline.

Enzi was appointed to serve on the National League of Cities' community development committee. He was vice-president and president of the Wyoming Association of Municipalities. Enzi's term as president of the Wyoming Association of Municipalities was meant to end in June 1983, but John Nickle had to serve the remainder of his term after Enzi left his mayoral office in January 1983.

=== Wyoming Legislature ===
John Ostlund, a member of the Wyoming Senate, ran for governor rather than seek reelection in 1978. The Casper Star-Tribune speculated that Enzi might run to succeed him, but Enzi instead announced that he would run for reelection as mayor on July 17. Dick Wallis, John Hines, and Enzi were elected to the three seats in the Wyoming House of Representatives from Campbell County in the 1986 election without opposition as Republicans. All three representatives won reelection in the 1988 and 1990 elections against Democratic opponents.

State Senator Kelly Mader resigned on December 9, 1991, after moving with his family to Denver, Colorado, where he started a consulting firm business. Enzi was selected to replace Mader on December 13, while rancher David Shippy was selected to replace Enzi in the state house. Enzi faced no opposition in the Republican primary or general election in 1992.

During Enzi's tenure in the state house, he served on the Education, Corporations and Elections, and Mines and Minerals committees. He served on the Joint Appropriations Committee and as the chair of the Revenue Committee in the state senate. He lost his position as chair of the Revenue Committee and was replaced by Grant Larson in 1996, as senate rules prohibited statewide candidates from serving as chairs of committee.

=== United States Senate ===
==== Elections ====
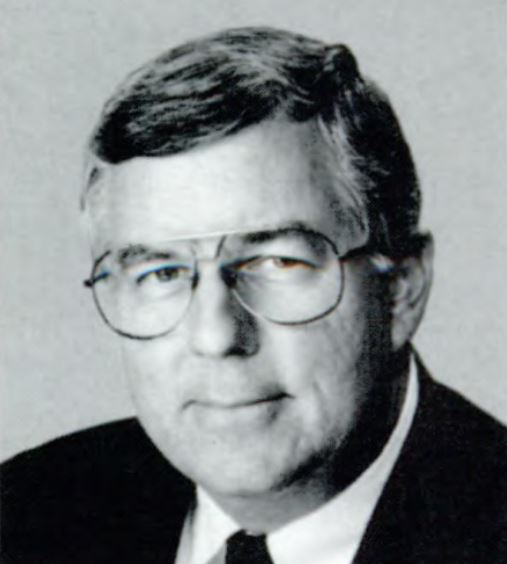
1997

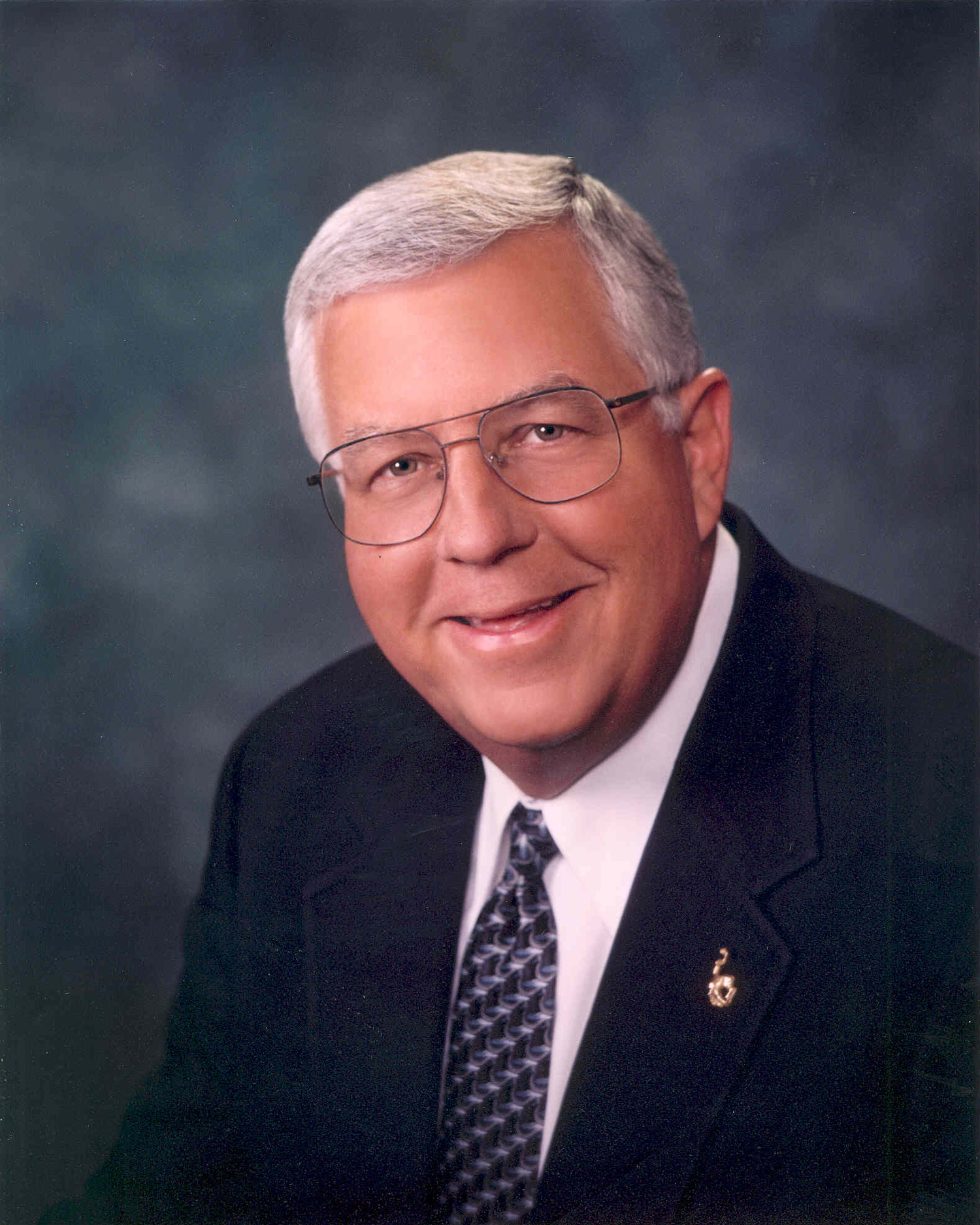
2000s

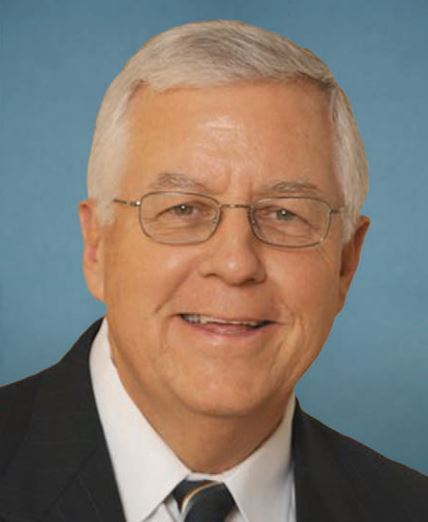
2009

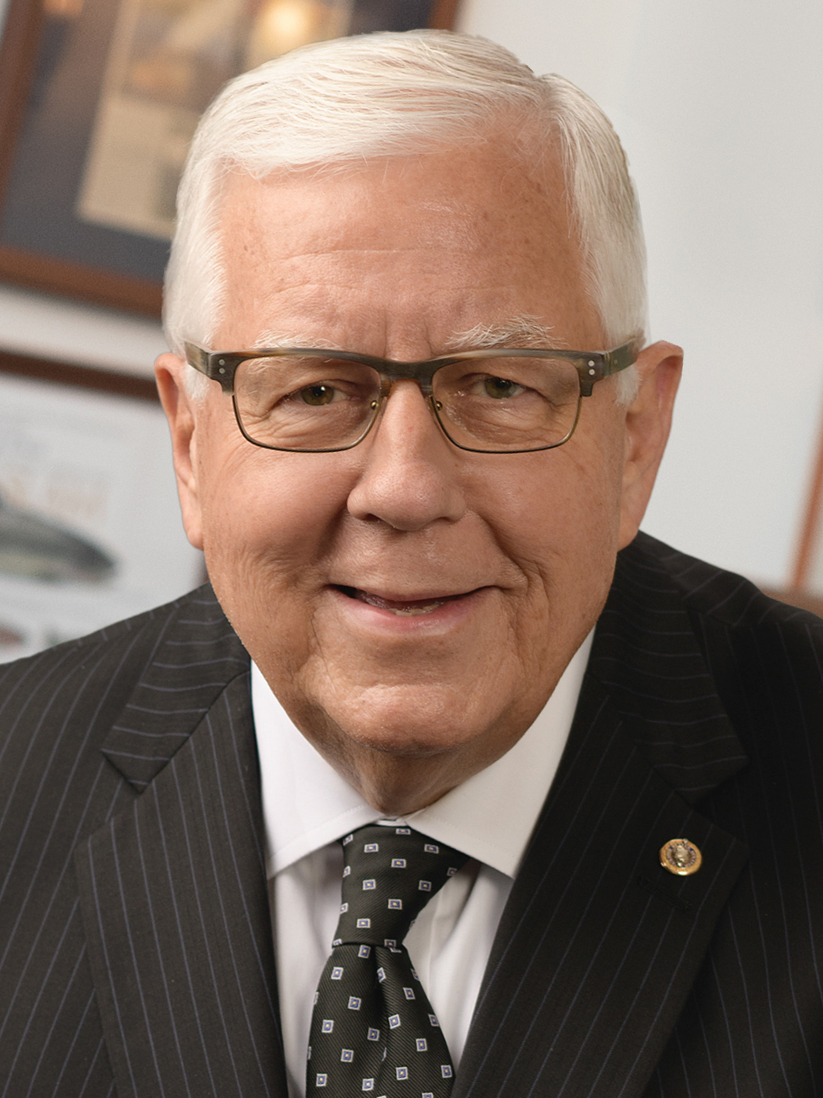
2018

Mike Enzi during his tenure in the United States Senate

Simpson, who was first elected to the United States Senate in 1978, announced on December 3, 1995, that he would not seek reelection in 1996. Enzi announced his campaign for the Republican nomination on April 9, 1996, and defeated eight other candidates in the primary; one of those candidates was John Barrasso, who would later be appointed to the U.S. Senate in 2007. Enzi garnered support due to his opposition to abortion, while Barrasso, who had been expected to win the primary, supported abortion rights at the time. Enzi defeated Democratic nominee Kathy Karpan in the general election. During the campaign, Enzi raised $1,020,906 and spent $989,572.

On March 22, 2002, Enzi announced that he would run for reelection in 2002. Dick Bratton served as his campaign chair. Enzi defeated Crosby Allen, a county commissioner from Fremont County, in the Republican primary and Democratic nominee Joyce Corcoran, the mayor of Lander, Wyoming, in the general election. During the 2002 election Enzi raised $1,443,925 and spent $1,130,628 compared to the $8,488 raised and $8,467 spent by Corcoran. In the 2008 election he raised $2,369,093 and spent $2,129,834 in order to defeat Democratic nominee Chris Rothfuss, who raised $32,326 and spent $27,258.

Liz Cheney, the daughter of Vice President Dick Cheney, initially opposed Enzi in the Republican primary during the 2014 election, but polling showed that Enzi would defeat her. Cheney dropped out of the race, citing family health concerns. Enzi defeated Democratic nominee Charlie Hardy and independent candidate Curt Gottshall in the election after raising $3,777,045 and spending $3,491,953 compared to the $91,678 and $76,631 raised and $88,284 and $76,431 spent by Hardy and Gottshall respectively. On May 4, 2019, Enzi announced that he would not seek reelection in 2020, and U.S. Representative Cynthia Lummis was elected to succeed him. Enzi's tenure of 24 years made him the third-longest-serving senator from Wyoming behind Francis E. Warren's 37 years and Joseph C. O'Mahoney's 25 years.

==== Tenure ====
In 1997, Enzi asked the U.S. Senate parliamentarian if he could bring his laptop onto the floor of the U.S. Senate and was told to ask Sergeant at Arms Gregory S. Casey. Casey told Enzi that the rules only allowed "mechanical devices" that were deemed "necessary and proper", but that he could not determine what met that criteria without guidance from the U.S. Senate. The Rules and Administration Committee requested Casey to write a report. Casey conducted a three-month study and determined that the rules allowed members to use laptops on the floor, but not if they were connected to an outside network. John Warner, the chair of the Rules Committee, sent the report to all 100 senators for consideration in September. Robert Byrd was opposed stating that the sound of typing would be irritating. Robert Torricelli, Dianne Feinstein, and Kay Bailey Hutchison also opposed allowing laptops onto the floor. On November 5, the Committee voted against allowing Enzi to bring his laptop onto the floor. Rick Santorum was the only member to support the proposal. As of 2018, personal electronic devices remained prohibited from the floor.

Following Trent Lott's resignation, Enzi lobbied for Bill Frist to become Senate Majority Leader. The Central Wyoming Council and the Boy Scouts of America nominated Enzi for the Distinguished Eagle Scout Award, which was given to him in 1999; Enzi was the first Wyomingite to receive the award. The Air Force Association awarded the Stuart Symington award, given for outstanding civilian contribution in the field of national security and the organization's highest civilian award, to Enzi and U.S. Representative Cliff Stearns for co-founding the Congressional Air Force Caucus. The Golden Gavel Award, which is given to those who preside over the U.S. Senate for 100 hours in a single session, was given to Enzi in 1997 and 2004.

During the impeachment trial of President Bill Clinton, Enzi voted against calling Monica Lewinsky to testify. He voted to convict Clinton on both articles of impeachment, but neither article received enough support to remove Clinton. Enzi voted against convicting Donald Trump on both articles of impeachment in his first impeachment trial. The nominations of John Roberts, Samuel Alito, Neil Gorsuch, Brett Kavanaugh, and Amy Coney Barrett to the Supreme Court of the United States were supported by Enzi. He voted against Sonia Sotomayor and Elena Kagan's nominations.

Andrea Palladio's influence on American architecture was recognized by Congress due to a resolution sponsored by Enzi and Bill Pascrell. A Congressional Gold Medal was awarded to Constantino Brumidi in 2012 due to legislation sponsored by Enzi and Pascrell. The Powell Shooting Range Land Conveyance Act, which directed the Bureau of Land Management to convey 322 acres of federal land near Powell, Wyoming, to the Powell Recreation District, was sponsored by Enzi and signed into law in 2013.

The conservative Heritage Action gave Enzi a lifetime score of 74%, Conservative Political Action Conference gave him a lifetime score of 91.10%, and the liberal Americans for Democratic Action gave him a score of 5% in 2020. National Journal rates members of Congress on how liberal or conservative they are in the categories of economic, social, and foreign policy; it gave Enzi a composite conservative score of 90.2 in 2011, 87.8 in 2012, and 95.8 in 2013.

National Journal listed Enzi as the 4th-most conservative senator in 2011, the 8th-most in 2012, and 2nd-most in 2013. GovTrack listed Enzi as the second-most conservative senator in 2014, but also rated him as the third-most-likely Republican to work with Democrats. The Lugar Center gave him a lifetime bipartisan ranking of 147 out of 250 senators from 1993 to 2018. Enzi adhered to an 80/20 rule for bipartisan compromise in which senators would focus on the 80% they agreed on and remove the 20% that they did not.

==== Committees ====
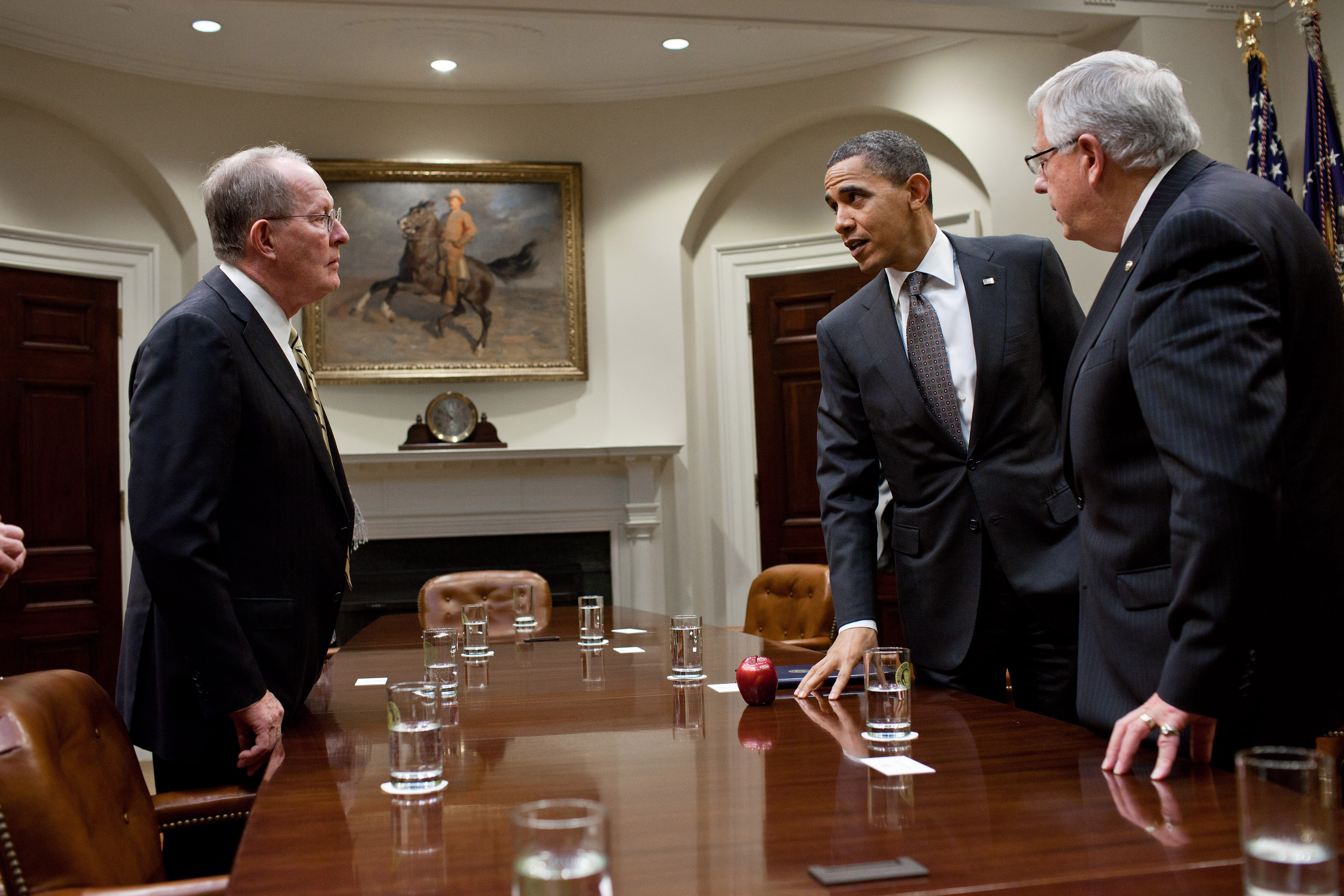
Enzi with U.S. Senator Lamar Alexander and President Barack Obama discussing No Child Left Behind in the Roosevelt Room of the White House, February 2011

During Enzi's tenure in the U.S. Senate he served on the Banking, Housing, and Urban Affairs, and Labor and Human Resources committees. Enzi became the chair of the Employment and Workplace Safety and Banking subcommittees following the defeat of several Republicans in the 1998 elections. He succeeded Judd Gregg as chair of the Health, Education, Labor and Pensions Committee in 2004, and Patty Murray as chair of the Budget Committee in 2015. He was the first accountant to chair the Budget Committee.

Jim Jeffords left the Republicans to become an independent and was replaced on the Finance Committee by Craig L. Thomas. Thomas, who was on the Foreign Relations Committee, was replaced by Enzi. Thomas's death and Lott's resignation in 2007 opened seats on the Finance committee that Enzi sought, but John Ensign and John E. Sununu were given the seats instead. Sununu lost reelection in 2008 and Enzi was given a seat on the Finance Committee in 2009.

== Death ==
On July 23, 2021, Enzi broke his neck and multiple ribs in a bicycling accident near his home in Gillette. He was flown to Medical Center of the Rockies in Loveland, Colorado, where he died on July 26.

== Political positions ==
=== Abortion ===
Enzi was given a 0% rating from the abortion rights organization NARAL Pro-Choice America in its 1997 report. Enzi supported legislation to prohibit the use of federal money to perform abortions. He voted in favor of the Pain-Capable Unborn Child Protection Act in 2018, which would criminalize performing an abortion if the estimated post-fertilization age of a fetus is 20 weeks or more. In 2020, Enzi was among 39 senators and 168 representatives who signed an amicus brief calling for the Supreme Court to overturn Roe v. Wade.

=== Campaign finance ===
Enzi was an opponent of the Bipartisan Campaign Reform Act, stating that it violated the First Amendment rights of interest groups to contribute money. He voted to sustain a filibuster against it in 1997 and 1998, and voted against it in 2002. He returned $3,500 in campaign contributions given to him by Enron following their scandal, but kept the $10,000 given to him by Ted Stevens following his corruption indictment.

=== Coinage ===
Enzi led the effort to create the Sacagawea dollar to honor the Native American guide Sacagawea and replace the Susan B. Anthony dollar. Other members of the U.S. Senate wanted the coin to depict the Statue of Liberty, Clara Barton, Shirley Chisholm, Rosa Parks, Pocahontas, or another figure. Enzi wrote a letter to Treasury Secretary Robert Rubin asking for the coin to be unveiled at Fort Washakie. The Sacagawea coin was made the official state coin of Wyoming in 2005. He expressed support for the dollar coin in 2013, and wanted to eliminate the penny during his career.

=== Crime ===
Enzi expressed support for capital punishment in 1990.

John Perry and Enzi cosponsored legislation in 1986, which would make the assault and battery of people above the age of 65 a high misdemeanor.

The Drug Enforcement Administration ruled that it was illegal to use controlled substances for assisted suicide. Enzi requested Attorney General Janet Reno speak out against assisted suicide as he was "concerned that the proponents of assisted suicide could interpret her silence on the matter as an approval".

Enzi supported the creation of an amendment prohibiting the desecration of the flag of the United States. Enzi voted in favor of the flag desecration amendment in 2000 and 2006, but it failed to receive a two-thirds majority both times.

Enzi voted against the Comprehensive Immigration Reform Act of 2006 as he opposed allowing illegal immigrants qualify for Social Security. He viewed Deferred Action for Childhood Arrivals as unconstitutional. In 2015 and 2018, he voted in favor of withholding federal funding from sanctuary cities.

Legal scholar Brian C. Kalt wrote a journal article about a loophole in Idaho's section of the Yellowstone National Park in which no jury could be assembled for prosecution of crimes committed in that area. Enzi was notified of this issue as it was covered in C. J. Box's 2007 novel Free Fire. Enzi sent a letter to Attorney General Alberto Gonzales in which he requested the United States Department of Justice to close the loophole. However, the Department of Justice declined to make any changes and that it would prosecute any crimes committed in the area.

=== Economics ===
Enzi opposed a ballot initiative in 1994, that would allow counties in Wyoming to legalize gambling and was director of Wyomingites for a Better Economy Today and Tomorrow, which opposed the initiative. In 1997, Enzi introduced an amendment to legislation for the United States Department of the Interior's spending that would prohibit approving new Native American casinos without state approval; the Arapaho and Shoshone tribes criticized Enzi for proposing this without consulting them. Ron Allen, the president of the National Congress of American Indians and chair of the Klallam tribe, criticized Enzi for attempting to limit the power of Native Americans to negotiate gambling contracts with the federal government.

Enzi supported the International Monetary Fund's bailout of South Korea during the 1997 Asian financial crisis.

Enzi was given a Taxpayer's Friend award by the National Taxpayers Union in their 1999 report. Enzi opposed the estate tax and criticized Clinton for vetoing legislation in 2000 which would phase out the estate tax at the federal level over the course of ten years.

Enzi voted against an amendment to raise the minimum wage by $1 over the course of two years in 1998, and against raising the minimum wage from $7.25 to $10.10 an hour in 2014. In 2006, he proposed a two-staged minimum wage increase of $1.10 over the course of 18 months as an alternative to a minimum wage increase proposed by Ted Kennedy.

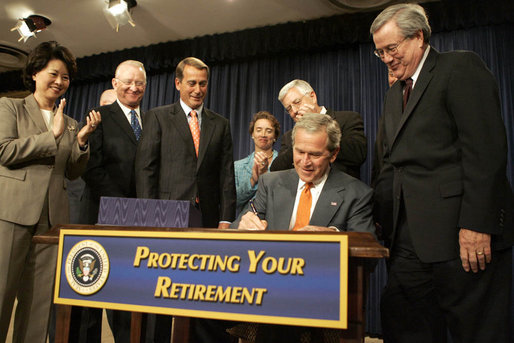
Enzi standing behind President George W. Bush as he signs into law the Pension Protection Act, August 2006

Enzi was among 24 U.S. Senators who wrote a letter to Clinton in 1999, asking him to implement tariffs to protect lamb production in the United States. He supported a 2002 ruling by the United States International Trade Commission which would allow tariffs on wheat imports from Canada. Enzi was among 16 Republican senators who cosponsored legislation in 2018 which would suspend the 22% tariff on newsprint from Canada. Trump imposed a 25% tariff on steel and 10% tariff on aluminum in 2018; Enzi opposed both of these. Enzi voted in favor of the United States–Mexico–Canada Agreement in 2020.

Enzi supported the creation of a balanced budget amendment and stated that, without the amendment, the president could use "smoke and mirrors" to circumvent requirements for a balanced budget. He voted against the American Recovery and Reinvestment Act of 2009. In 2011, he introduced legislation to change the creation of the United States federal budget from an annual basis to biennial.

=== Environment ===
The Public Interest Research Group gave Enzi a 0% rating for votes on environmental legislation conducted between March 1997 and March 1998. The League of Conservation Voters gave Enzi an 0% rating from 1997 to 2004, and in 2006, 2013, 2015, 2017, and 2020; his lifetime score from the organization was 5%.

In 1994, the state senate voted 29 to 1, with Enzi as the sole vote against, in favor of placing a moratorium on the sale of state land. The Bush administration proposed to sell up to 300,000 acres of national forests and grasslands in 2006 as a way to underwrite the reauthorization of the Secure Rural Schools and Community Self-Determination Act of 2000; Enzi opposed selling public lands in order to fund the reauthorization. Enzi supported drilling in the Arctic National Wildlife Refuge.

In 2000, Enzi supported legislation by Senator Mike Crapo which would remove total maximum daily load from the Clean Water Act.

Byrd and Enzi cosponsored a resolution, made in response to the United Nations Framework Convention on Climate Change, calling for Clinton to not sign global climate agreements if they harmed the interests of the United States or if they failed to include developing nations. Enzi opposed the Kyoto Protocol. In 2017, Enzi was one of the 22 Republican senators who called for Trump to withdraw from the Paris Agreement.

Emission rules instituted by the United States Environmental Protection Agency (EPA) in 2014 required Wyoming to reduce its carbon emissions by 19%. Enzi supported legislation in 2015 which would allow governors to reject emission requirement plans by the EPA. In 2017, Enzi supported proposals to reduce the EPA's staff by 3,000.

Enzi supported repealing legislation that phased out incandescent light bulbs in favor of compact fluorescent lamps.

=== Equality ===
The civil rights organization National Association for the Advancement of Colored People gave Enzi an F rating in 2002. He opposed the creation of federal hate crime legislation and attempts by Clinton to expand federal hate crime legislation. Enzi denounced the murder of Matthew Shepard, a gay man, and expressed sympathy for his family, but voted against the Matthew Shepard and James Byrd Jr. Hate Crimes Prevention Act.

Enzi supported legislation in the Wyoming state senate in 1997 that would have denied recognition in Wyoming to same-sex marriages performed in other states. In 2001, he supported the Boy Scouts exclusion of gay scouts and leaders and supported legislation to end federal aid to schools which prohibited the Boy Scouts due to their refusal to admit gay members. Santorum stated in response to Lawrence v. Texas that sodomy laws should be upheld as he believed that allowing sodomy would give people the right to incest, bigamy, and adultery; Enzi supported these comments. In 2004, Enzi voted in favor of the Federal Marriage Amendment, which would prohibit gay marriage.

Enzi cosponsored a resolution in 1998 expressing support for Judge Roy Moore's attempts to have the Ten Commandments displayed in his courtroom.

=== Foreign policy ===
Enzi opposed sending soldiers to Kosovo to participate in the Kosovo War and stated that "there was no exit plan built in". Enzi voted to express Congressional approval for the prosecution of war crimes and crimes against humanity committed during the Yugoslav Wars.

Enzi supported legislation to end the blockade on food and medicine sales and donations to Cuba in 1998, and later asked Bush to lift restrictions on selling American food and medicine to Cuba. Enzi stated that the United States Congress should not become involved with Elián González, a Cuban who arrived in the United States after the boat carrying him and his mother shipwrecked. In 2003, he and Senator Max Baucus called for travel restrictions to Cuba to be lifted. An amendment in both the House and Senate versions of the 2004 appropriations bill for the Treasury and Transportation departments would prohibit funds being used to enforce the travel ban to Cuba, but this language was removed by a conference committee formed by Majority Leader Tom DeLay, who gave 10 of the 17 House seats to people who supported the ban; Enzi criticized this method as the legislation was "stripped by staffers" without a vote being taken. In 2009, he and Senator Byron Dorgan introduced the Freedom to Travel to Cuba Act with other Democratic and Republican senators to allow Americans to travel to Cuba and supported other legislation to allow Americans to travel to Cuba.

Enzi voted in favor of the Authorization for Use of Military Force of 2001 and the Authorization for Use of Military Force Against Iraq Resolution of 2002. Enzi praised Bush's 2003 State of the Union Address stating that he had made solid arguments against Iraq's weapons of mass destruction program and supported the need to disarm Iraq. Enzi stated that Saddam Hussein must be overthrown to disarm Iraq. In 2003, he stated that he still believed that Iraq had weapons of mass destruction despite no weapons of mass destruction being discovered following the invasion of Iraq. The withdrawal of United States troops from Iraq was opposed by Enzi. Questioning what objectives would be achieved or interests served, Enzi opposed giving Barack Obama authorization to order military strikes against Ba'athist Syria.

The Comprehensive Nuclear-Test-Ban Treaty was opposed by Enzi, who stated that the United States needed to test its nuclear weapons as one-third of the nuclear weapons were detected to have flaws from 1945 to 1992. He supported either amending or leaving the Anti-Ballistic Missile Treaty in order for the United States to improve its missile defense against nuclear weapons. In 2015, Enzi was among the 47 Republican members of the U.S. Senate who signed a letter to the leaders of the Islamic Republic of Iran stating that the nuclear deal between Iran and the United States could be undone by a future president.

Enzi was the only senator to vote against the Burmese Freedom and Democracy Act in 2016. The legislation eliminated American imports from Myanmar, placed restrictions on the visas of Myanmar's leaders, and required American opposition to international financial institutions giving loans to Myanmar.

Enzi opposed returning the Balangiga bells, which were taken as war trophies during the Philippine–American War, to the Philippines in 2018.

=== Gun rights ===
The NRA Political Victory Fund gave Enzi "A" ratings in 1996, and 2014. Enzi initially supported the Violent and Repeat Juvenile Offender Act in 1998, which aimed to reduce crimes committed by juveniles, but withdrew his support stating that the legislation infringed on the Second Amendment. Enzi voted against amendments to the Juvenile Justice Enforcement Act in 1999, which would require background checks for firearms sales at gun shows and flea markets, regulate the transfer of firearms through the internet, and ban the importation of high capacity ammunition magazines; he was one of two senators who voted against an amendment to prohibit juveniles from purchasing or possessing assault-style semi-automatic weapons without the consent of a parent. Enzi introduced legislation in 2001, which would have required law enforcement to destroy the records created by the Federal Bureau of Investigation of people who passed a background check for a gun purchase.

=== Healthcare ===
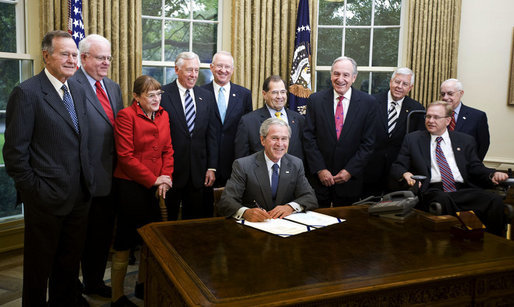
Enzi in the Oval Office with former president George H. W. Bush while President George W. Bush signs the ADA Amendments Act in September 2008

In 2000, Enzi asked Senator William Roth, the chair of the Finance Committee, to implement geographic equity for Medicare spending in order to give money to rural healthcare. Enzi voted in favor of the Genetic Information Nondiscrimination Act.

Enzi voted against the Affordable Care Act in 2009, and in favor of repealing it in 2015. On January 3, 2017, he, in his role as chair of the Budget Committee, introduced S.Con.Res. 3 to authorize the use of reconciliation to repeal parts of the ACA; this and similar legislation in the U.S. House set the procedural rules for the American Health Care Act of 2017.

== Electoral history ==
Electoral history of Mike Enzi
Year	Office	Party	Primary			General			Result	Ref.
Year	Office	Party	Total	%	P.	Total	%	P.	Result	Ref.
1986	Wyoming House of Representatives (Campbell County multi-member district)	Republican	—N/a			5,901	30.96%	3rd	Won	
1988	Wyoming House of Representatives (Campbell County multi-member district)	Republican	—N/a			6,253	27.62%	3rd	Won	
1990	Wyoming House of Representatives (Campbell County multi-member district)	Republican	4,414	32.37%	3rd	Figures not available			Won	
1992	Wyoming Senate (24th district)	Republican	2,409	100.00%	1st	Unopposed			Won	
1996	United States Senate	Republican	27,056	32.47%	1st	114,116	54.06%	1st	Won	
2002	United States Senate	Republican	78,612	85.87%	1st	133,710	72.95%	1st	Won	
2008	United States Senate	Republican	69,195	100.00%	1st	189,046	75.63%	1st	Won	
2014	United States Senate	Republican	77,965	81.82%	1st	121,554	72.19%	1st	Won	

== Works cited ==
=== Books ===
- Barilleaux, Ryan; Kelley, Christopher, eds. (2010). The Unitary Executive and the Modern Presidency. Texas A&M University Press. ISBN 9781603443784.
- Barr, Donald (2021). Crossing the American Health Care Chasm: Finding the Path to Bipartisan Collaboration in National Health Care Policy. Johns Hopkins University Press. ISBN 9781421441344.
- Clymer, Kenton (2016). A Delicate Relationship: The United States and Burma/Myanmar since 1945. Cornell University Press. ISBN 9781501701023.
- Lockwood, Jeffrey (2017). Behind the Carbon Curtain: The Energy Industry, Political Censorship, and Free Speech. University of New Mexico Press. ISBN 9780826358080.
- Mariño, Soraya (2012). Fifty Years of Revolution: Perspectives on Cuba, the United States, and the World. University Press of Florida. ISBN 9780813043616.
- Miller, Char (2012). Public Lands, Public Debates: A Century of Controversy. Oregon State University Press. ISBN 9780870716607.
- Petersen, Keith (2022). Inventing Idaho: The Gem State's Eccentric Shape. Washington State University Press. ISBN 9781636821122.

=== Election reports ===
- "1996 Wyoming election results" (PDF). Secretary of State of Wyoming. p. 2. Archived (PDF) from the original on March 27, 2021.
- "1996 Wyoming primary results" (PDF). Secretary of State of Wyoming. p. 1. Archived (PDF) from the original on March 27, 2021.
- "2002 Wyoming election results" (PDF). Secretary of State of Wyoming. p. 1. Archived (PDF) from the original on March 27, 2021.
- "2002 Wyoming primary results" (PDF). Secretary of State of Wyoming. p. 1. Archived (PDF) from the original on March 27, 2021.
- "2008 Wyoming election results" (PDF). Secretary of State of Wyoming. p. 2. Archived (PDF) from the original on January 19, 2024.
- "2008 Wyoming primary results" (PDF). Secretary of State of Wyoming. p. 1. Archived (PDF) from the original on January 19, 2024.
- "2014 Wyoming election results" (PDF). Secretary of State of Wyoming. p. 1. Archived (PDF) from the original on January 19, 2024.
- "2014 Wyoming primary results" (PDF). Secretary of State of Wyoming. p. 1. Archived (PDF) from the original on January 19, 2024.
- "2020 election" (PDF). Secretary of State of Wyoming. p. 2. Archived (PDF) from the original on March 27, 2021.

=== Journals ===
- "Gregg Gives Up Chairmanship of Senate Health Panel, Enzi Takes Over". Inside EPA's Water Policy Report. 10 (46). Inside Washington Publishers: 3. 2004. doi:10.2307/26711260. JSTOR 26711260.
- "Senator Crapo Urges Colleagues To Kill Controversial Clean Water Rule". Inside EPA's Water Policy Report. 9 (16). Inside Washington Publishers: 13. 2000. doi:10.2307/26824145. JSTOR 26824145.

=== News ===
- "After 17 Years, Simpson Will Leave Senate". The New York Times. December 3, 1995. Archived from the original on May 26, 2015.
- "Senate defeats minimum wage increase". NBC News. June 21, 2006. Archived from the original on May 11, 2025.
- "Where Lawmakers Stand on Military Action in Syria". The New York Times. September 5, 2013. Archived from the original on April 1, 2025.
- "Wyo senators vote against immigration bill". Casper Star-Tribune. May 26, 2006. Archived from the original on October 3, 2026.
- "Wyoming Voters Pick Senate Candidates". CNN. August 21, 1996. Archived from the original on October 5, 2001.
- Burns, Alexander; Kopan, Tal; Hohmann, James (January 6, 2014). "Cheney: 'I have decided to discontinue my campaign'". Politico. Archived from the original on September 2, 2015.
- Carney, Jordain (February 17, 2018). "The 14 GOP senators who voted against Trump's immigration framework". The Hill. Archived from the original on February 6, 2024.
- Dumain, Emma (July 10, 2012). "Campus Notebook: Artist Constantino Brumidi to Finally Receive Medal". Roll Call. Archived from the original on July 26, 2026.
- Edwards, Melodie (January 20, 2014). "Congressional report card shows Wyo's lawmakers most conservative". Wyoming Public Radio. Archived from the original on July 26, 2026.
- Fisher, Max (March 10, 2015). "The uproar over Sen. Tom Cotton's letter to Iran, explained". Vox. Archived from the original on February 9, 2025.
- Fortin, Jacey (July 27, 2021). "Michael Enzi, Long-Serving U.S. Senator From Wyoming, Dies at 77". The New York Times. Archived from the original on August 3, 2021.
- Gruver, Mead (July 27, 2021). "Ex-US Sen. Mike Enzi of Wyoming dies after bicycle accident". Associated Press. Archived from the original on July 27, 2021.
- Gugliotta, Guy (September 2, 1997). "The Senate's Lonely Laptop Lobby". The Washington Post. Archived from the original on December 2, 2024.
- Hancock, Laura (December 19, 2014). "Enzi hopeful trade of products, ideas will move Cuba forward". Billings Gazette. Archived from the original on December 27, 2014.
- Johnson, Greg (January 9, 2021). "Recently retired Wyoming senator settling back in at home". Associated Press. Archived from the original on February 6, 2021.
- Kane, Paul (July 27, 2021). "Former senator Mike Enzi dies after being injured in bike accident". The Washington Post. Archived from the original on September 18, 2021.
- Kasperowicz, Pete (January 25, 2013). "Sen. Vitter proposes abortion bills to mark 'March for Life' rally". The Hill. Archived from the original on February 6, 2024.
- Kovach, Kaitlin (September 14, 2010). "Palladio's Legacy Lives On in Washington Architecture". Roll Call. Archived from the original on July 26, 2026.
- Lancaster, John (January 31, 2011). "Rising From the Right: Barrasso's rise in Senate follows increasingly conservative course". Casper Star-Tribune. Archived from the original on April 6, 2016.
- Laslo, Matt (January 16, 2015). "Sen. Enzi Gets A Gavel - The First Accountant Ever To Chair The Budget Committee". Wyoming Public Radio. Archived from the original on July 27, 2021.
- Laslo, Matt (June 6, 2014). "Wyoming's Congressional Delegation Believes New EPA Rules Will Devastate The Economy". Wyoming Public Radio. Archived from the original on July 26, 2026.
- Laslo, Matt (May 29, 2015). "Wyo. Senators Want Governor, Not EPA, To Decide State's Climate Future". Wyoming Public Radio. Archived from the original on July 26, 2026.
- Laslo, Matt (March 3, 2017). "Wyoming GOP Split On Details of Trump Address". Wyoming Public Radio. Archived from the original on July 26, 2026.
- Longoria, Julia; Melathe, Alvin (May 26, 2022). "The Experiment Podcast: The 50-Square-Mile Zone Where the Constitution Doesn't Apply". The Atlantic. Archived from the original on July 26, 2026.
- Lopez, German (June 13, 2016). "Here are the members of Congress who voted against protecting gay people from hate crimes". Vox. Archived from the original on August 9, 2016.
- Matthews, Dylan (October 29, 2016). "Yellowstone has a 50 square mile "Zone of Death" where you can get away with murder". Vox. Archived from the original on January 14, 2017.
- Morton, Tom (March 6, 2018). "Wyoming Delegation Denounces President Trump's Proposed Tariffs On Steel, Aluminum". KTWO. Archived from the original on May 11, 2026.
- Perano, Ursula (January 2, 2020). "39 GOP senators sign brief asking Supreme Court to revisit Roe v. Wade". Axios. Archived from the original on May 24, 2022.
- Reynolds, Nick (May 5, 2019). "After 22 years in office, Sen. Mike Enzi says he will retire in 2020". Casper Star-Tribune. Archived from the original on November 5, 2020.
- Roerink, Kyle (January 6, 2014). "Liz Cheney slams new poll showing huge Mike Enzi lead in Wyoming U.S. Senate race". Casper Star-Tribune. Archived from the original on July 28, 2021.
- Schmitt, Eric (November 9, 1997). "Senate Won't Yield Floor to Laptops". The New York Times. Archived from the original on May 27, 2015.
- Thulin, Lila (April 20, 2018). "What You Can and Can't Bring onto the Floor in Congress". Washingtonian. Archived from the original on April 22, 2018.
- Vinik, Danny (January 29, 2015). "Now That It's Budget Time, Republicans Are Pretending to Care About the Deficit Again". The New Republic. Archived from the original on June 20, 2026.
- Welna, David (March 31, 2009). "Bill Would Allow Travel To Cuba". NPR. Archived from the original on January 2, 2015.

=== Newspapers ===
- "1986 Wyoming House of Representatives election". Casper Star-Tribune. November 6, 1986. p. 11 – via Newspapers.com.
- "1988 Wyoming House of Representatives election". Casper Star-Tribune. November 9, 1988. p. 11 – via Newspapers.com.
- "1990 Wyoming House of Representatives primary". Casper Star-Tribune. August 23, 1990. p. 15 – via Newspapers.com.
- "1992 Wyoming primary results". Casper Star-Tribune. August 20, 1992. p. 13 – via Newspapers.com.
- "Boys State Opens Camp At Douglas". Casper Star-Tribune. June 12, 1961. p. 2 – via Newspapers.com.
- "C. H. Davis loses race". Casper Star-Tribune. August 22, 1974. p. 21 – via Newspapers.com.
- "Campbell rancher appointed to House". Casper Star-Tribune. January 4, 1992. p. 15 – via Newspapers.com.
- "Campbell school issue passes". Casper Star-Tribune. September 14, 1978. p. 5 – via Newspapers.com.
- "Candidates continuing to file in". Casper Star-Tribune. June 19, 1986. p. 14 – via Newspapers.com.
- "Coin to honor Sacajawea". Casper Star-Tribune. December 23, 1998. p. 11 – via Newspapers.com.
- "Cubin, Enzi score low on environmental votes". Casper Star-Tribune. June 1, 1998. p. 5 – via Newspapers.com.
- "Daly". Casper Star-Tribune. November 11, 1992. p. 13 – via Newspapers.com.
- "Delegation panned for abortion stance". Casper Star-Tribune. January 16, 1998. p. 13 – via Newspapers.com.
- "Democrats find it hard going". Casper Star-Tribune. November 7, 1990. p. 13 – via Newspapers.com.
- "DeMolays Elect". Casper Morning Star. June 12, 1963. p. 8 – via Newspapers.com.
- "Dorothy B. Enzi". Casper Star-Tribune. April 6, 2007. p. B3 – via Newspapers.com.
- "Elmer J. Enzi". Casper Star-Tribune. February 4, 1988. p. 14 – via Newspapers.com.
- "Enzi: Boy's fate not for Congress". Casper Star-Tribune. February 6, 2000. p. 11 – via Newspapers.com.
- "Enzi Earns Highest Award From Air Force". Casper Star-Tribune. November 18, 2001. p. 44 – via Newspapers.com.
- "Enzi gets seat on Finance panel". Casper Star-Tribune. January 22, 2009. p. A3 – via Newspapers.com.
- "Enzi introduces gun bill". Casper Star-Tribune. May 23, 2001. p. 15 – via Newspapers.com.
- "Enzi makes C-Span appearance". Casper Star-Tribune. January 24, 1997. p. 13 – via Newspapers.com.
- "Enzi opposes sending infantry to Kosovo". Casper Star-Tribune. April 14, 1999. p. 1 – via Newspapers.com.
- "Enzi praises resolution". Casper Star-Tribune. July 27, 1997. p. 10 – via Newspapers.com.
- "Enzi receives Distinguished Eagle Scout Award". Casper Star-Tribune. June 6, 1999. p. 40 – via Newspapers.com.
- "Enzi: Resolution supports judge in displaying commandments". Casper Star-Tribune. April 4, 1998. p. 10 – via Newspapers.com.
- "Enzi responds to questions about his military service". Billings Gazette. October 29, 1996. p. 8A – via Newspapers.com.
- "Enzi supports move to $1 coin". Casper Star-Tribune. June 16, 2013. p. A3 – via Newspapers.com.
- "Enzi, Thomas vote for Roberts". Casper Star-Tribune. September 30, 2005. p. 13 – via Newspapers.com.
- "Enzi to run for second mayor term". Casper Star-Tribune. July 18, 1978. p. 13 – via Newspapers.com.
- "Enzi, Thomas taxpayer-friendly". Casper Star-Tribune. June 23, 2000. p. 13 – via Newspapers.com.
- "Enzi urges embargo easing". Casper Star-Tribune. December 2, 2001. p. 11 – via Newspapers.com.
- "Enzi wants 2-year federal budgets". Casper Star-Tribune. June 27, 2011. p. A3 – via Newspapers.com.
- "Enzi wants coin unveiled in Wyo". Casper Star-Tribune. April 3, 1999. p. 11 – via Newspapers.com.
- "Enzi wants 'robust' missile defense". Casper Star-Tribune. July 26, 2001. p. B1 – via Newspapers.com.
- "Enzi weighs political plans". Casper Star-Tribune. May 26, 1978. p. 19 – via Newspapers.com.
- "Enzi withdraws juvenile justice bill support". Casper Star-Tribune. April 23, 1998. p. 12 – via Newspapers.com.
- "Enzi won't run again". Casper Star-Tribune. July 8, 1982. p. 11 – via Newspapers.com.
- "Geringer new JAC chair". Casper Star-Tribune. December 17, 1991. p. 1 – via Newspapers.com.
- "Gillette lawmaker heads anti-gambling group". Casper Star-Tribune. August 18, 1994. p. 12 – via Newspapers.com.
- "Gillette marks end of $33 million debt". Casper Star-Tribune. August 20, 1995. p. 9 – via Newspapers.com.
- "House doesn't concur on school finance bill". Casper Star-Tribune. February 21, 1991. p. 4 – via Newspapers.com.
- "Indians angry with Enzi over gambling restrictions". Casper Star-Tribune. April 8, 1998. p. 1 – via Newspapers.com.
- "Jaycees elect nat'l director". Casper Star-Tribune. May 25, 1973. p. 6 – via Newspapers.com.
- "Lovell councilman new head of state WAM". Casper Star-Tribune. February 9, 1983. p. 16 – via Newspapers.com.
- "Mayor receives appointment". Casper Star-Tribune. February 22, 1975. p. 7 – via Newspapers.com.
- "Mayor Sandison named to WAM". Casper Star-Tribune. January 29, 1981. p. 13 – via Newspapers.com.
- "Mike Enzi". Casper Star-Tribune. June 23, 1996. p. 1 – via Newspapers.com.
- "Nurse Advisory Group Organized". Casper Star-Tribune. December 9, 1970. p. 12 – via Newspapers.com.
- "Pastors". Casper Star-Tribune. July 13, 1998. p. 5 – via Newspapers.com.
- "Pat Meenan elected speaker of House". Casper Star-Tribune. November 9, 1986. p. 3 – via Newspapers.com.
- "Reno asked to oppose assisted suicide". Casper Star-Tribune. January 26, 1998. p. 4 – via Newspapers.com.
- "Seat filled". Casper Star-Tribune. May 2, 1976. p. 43 – via Newspapers.com.
- "Sen. Grant Larson". Jackson Hole News. May 29, 1996. p. 29 – via Newspapers.com.
- "Sacagawea officially becomes state coin". Casper Star-Tribune. February 12, 2005. p. 12 – via Newspapers.com.
- "Senate approves drilling on Alaska refuge". Casper Star-Tribune. March 17, 2005. p. 1 – via Newspapers.com.
- "Senate candidates get 'A's' from NRA". Casper Star-Tribune. September 21, 1996. p. 9 – via Newspapers.com.
- "Senators keep Stevens cash". Casper Star-Tribune. July 31, 2008. p. B1 – via Newspapers.com.
- "Senators: Perry says test explosions unnecessary". Casper Star-Tribune. October 13, 1999. p. A10 – via Newspapers.com.
- "Senators pleased with wheat tariffs". Casper Star-Tribune. November 24, 2002. p. 12 – via Newspapers.com.
- "Senators vote against reform bill". Casper Star-Tribune. May 26, 2006. p. 1 – via Newspapers.com.
- "Sole senator opposes state land sales bill". Casper Star-Tribune. March 19, 1994. p. 7 – via Newspapers.com.
- "Thomas, Enzi favor amendment". Casper Star-Tribune. June 29, 1999. p. 9 – via Newspapers.com.
- "Tribes disappointed with Enzi gaming legislation". Casper Star-Tribune. September 25, 1997. p. 12 – via Newspapers.com.
- "True hoping to name JAC co-chairman by Monday". Casper Star-Tribune. December 15, 1991. p. 1 – via Newspapers.com.
- "Unopposed races may be sign of hard times". Casper Star-Tribune. November 2, 1986. p. 34 – via Newspapers.com.
- "Vote nixes ban on gay marriage". Casper Star-Tribune. July 15, 2004. p. 2 – via Newspapers.com.
- "Wyoming delegation opposes federal hate crimes legislation". Casper Star-Tribune. April 8, 1999. p. 1 – via Newspapers.com.
- "Wyoming Vote Watch". Casper Star-Tribune. May 17, 1999. p. 4.
- "Yugoslav Wars". Casper Star-Tribune. May 31, 1999. p. 10 – via Newspapers.com.
- Apple, R. (February 5, 1999). "Senate votes to view Lewinsky video". Casper Star-Tribune. p. 1 – via Newspapers.com.
- Bangs, Susan (July 3, 1974). "Contest for Gillette mayor widens". Casper Star-Tribune. p. 19 – via Newspapers.com.
- Barron, Joan (December 4, 1986). "Bills would deny jobs to state employees living elsewhere". Casper Star-Tribune. p. 9 – via Newspapers.com.
- Barron, Joan (August 26, 2018). "Don't celebrate return of bells yet". Casper Star-Tribune. p. A7 – via Newspapers.com.
- Barron, Joan (December 6, 1991). "Mader makes legislative departure official". Casper Star-Tribune. p. 13 – via Newspapers.com.
- Darr, Deanna (June 5, 2002). "Corcoran runs against Enzi". The Jackson Hole Guide. p. 10 – via Newspapers.com.
- Davant, Charles (January 22, 1999). "Enzi picked for top panel posts". Casper Star-Tribune. p. 13 – via Newspapers.com.
- Farquhar, Brodie (October 29, 2002). "Defectors don't worry Bebout fans". Casper Star-Tribune. p. 3 – via Newspapers.com.
- Farquhar, Brodie (March 23, 2002). "Enzi announces re-election effort". Casper Star-Tribune. p. 1 – via Newspapers.com.
- Farquhar, Brodie (January 18, 2002). "Enzi returns Enron campaign donations". Casper Star-Tribune. p. 1 – via Newspapers.com.
- Farquhar, Brodie (January 29, 2003). "Wyo delegation praises speech". Casper Star-Tribune. p. A1 – via Newspapers.com.
- Feller, Ben (May 22, 2008). "Law forbids insurance loss for DNA findings". Casper Star-Tribune. p. A6 – via Newspapers.com.
- Gordon, Marcy (September 23, 1998). "Senate rejects proposal to raise minimum wage". Casper Star-Tribune. p. 1 – via Newspapers.com.
- Hancock, Laura (May 2, 2014). "Dems criticize Enzi, Barrasso for rejecting wage increase". Casper Star-Tribune. p. A1 – via Newspapers.com.
- Iliano, Michael (June 4, 2018). "Wyoming delegation opposes paper tariff". Casper Star-Tribune. p. A3 – via Newspapers.com.
- Klamann, Seth (July 19, 2017). "Barrasso, Enzi might vote to repeal ACA". Casper Star-Tribune. p. A1 – via Newspapers.com.
- Luckett, Bill (October 13, 1998). "Sympathy pours out for Shepard's family". Casper Star-Tribune. p. 9 – via Newspapers.com.
- Marsden, Jason (June 15, 2001). "Enzi sides with Scouts". Casper Star-Tribune. p. 17 – via Newspapers.com.
- Marsden, Jason (October 1, 2000). "Rural health bill races the clock". Casper Star-Tribune. p. 11 – via Newspapers.com.
- Marsden, Jason (May 15, 1999). "Thomas calls on Clinton to aid lamb producers". Casper Star-Tribune. p. 13 – via Newspapers.com.
- Marsden, Jason (July 11, 2001). "Thomas wins Finance seat". Casper Star-Tribune. p. 1 – via Newspapers.com.
- Marsden, Jason (September 1, 2000). "Wyo delegation decries estate tax". Casper Star-Tribune. p. 1 – via Newspapers.com.
- McCarthy, Tom; Gambino, Lauren (June 1, 2017). "The Republicans who urged Trump to pull out of Paris deal are big oil darlings". The Guardian. Archived from the original on January 29, 2026.
- McManigal, Barney (October 8, 1999). "Enzi, Thomas oppose test-ban treaty". Casper Star-Tribune. p. B1 – via Newspapers.com.
- Missett, Kate (November 2, 1990). "Candidate: elected officials should dispense death penalty executions". Casper Star-Tribune. p. 3 – via Newspapers.com.
- Monoson, Ted (December 21, 2002). "Enzi lobbies for Frist's election". Casper Star-Tribune. p. 1 – via Newspapers.com.
- Monoson, Ted (January 4, 2003). "Enzi stuck neck out for Frist". Casper Star-Tribune. p. 1 – via Newspapers.com.
- Monoson, Ted (May 18, 2003). "Enzi supports Cuba travel". Casper Star-Tribune. p. 11 – via Newspapers.com.
- Monoson, Ted (April 26, 2003). "GOP lawmakers defend Santorum". Casper Star-Tribune. p. 1 – via Newspapers.com.
- Monoson, Ted (June 22, 2003). "Wyo delegation unfazed by missing weapons". Casper Star-Tribune. p. A10 – via Newspapers.com.
- Monoson, Ted (March 5, 2003). "Wyoming delegation solidly behind disarming Iraq". Casper Star-Tribune. p. A1 – via Newspapers.com.
- Morton, Tom (March 28, 2002). "Fremont's Allen challenges Enzi in GOP primary". Casper Star-Tribune. p. 1 – via Newspapers.com.
- Murray, Shailagh (April 27, 2007). "Senate sets showdown". Casper Star-Tribune. p. A1 – via Newspapers.com.
- Neary, Ben (February 21, 2009). "Barrasso urges caution with stimulus". Casper Star-Tribune. p. A3 – via Newspapers.com.
- Ross, Cindy (July 5, 1979). "New commission created". Casper Star-Tribune. p. 24 – via Newspapers.com.
- Schmitt, Eric (August 10, 1997). "Laptop: Committee to consider request in September". Casper Star-Tribune. p. 8 – via Newspapers.com.
- Stanton, Susan (January 12, 1997). "Marriage: Bill would not violate Wyoming's Constitution". Casper Star-Tribune. p. 8 – via Newspapers.com.
- Stanton, Susan (January 12, 1997). "State need law barring same-sex marriage, Wyo lawmakers say". Casper Star-Tribune. p. 1 – via Newspapers.com.
- Straub, Noelle (December 18, 2005). "An effective compromiser". Casper Star-Tribune. p. 1 – via Newspapers.com.
- Straub, Noelle (December 4, 2007). "Enzi aims for seat on powerful panel". Casper Star-Tribune. p. B1 – via Newspapers.com.
- Straub, Noelle (January 25, 2008). "Passed over, again". Casper Star-Tribune. p. B1 – via Newspapers.com.
- Tollefson, Chris (April 10, 1996). "Enzi announces U.S. Senate bid; GOP field widens to 6". Casper Star-Tribune. p. 1 – via Newspapers.com.
- Tollefson, Chris (December 10, 1997). "Enzi backs South Korea bailout". Casper Star-Tribune. p. 9 – via Newspapers.com.
- Tollefson, Chris (December 6, 1996). "Enzi lands labor, banking committee slots". Casper Star-Tribune. p. 1 – via Newspapers.com.
- Tollefson, Chris (October 29, 1996). "Enzi says his draft statements distorted". Casper Star-Tribune. p. A1 – via Newspapers.com.
- Tollefson, Chris (December 9, 1997). "Enzi: Senate positions get hostile response". Casper Star-Tribune. p. 1 – via Newspapers.com.
- Tollefson, Chris (October 29, 1996). "Enzi: VFW speech referred to OCS". Casper Star-Tribune. p. A8 – via Newspapers.com.
- Tollefson, Chris (September 11, 1998). "Reform: Changes in fund-raising squashed". Casper Star-Tribune. p. 21 – via Newspapers.com.
- Tollefson, Chris (October 8, 1997). "Thomas, Enzi vote no; want different reform". Casper Star-Tribune. p. 1 – via Newspapers.com.
- Van Dusen, Matthew (August 25, 2002). "NAACP's Rivers: 'Freedom under fire'". Casper Star-Tribune. p. 1 – via Newspapers.com.
- Wheeler, Catherine (July 30, 2021). "Former U.S. Sen. Mike Enzi Remembered For Political Career, Bipartisanship". Wyoming Public Radio. Archived from the original on January 29, 2026.
- White, Nadia (July 3, 1993). "Revenue chairmen dery tax law effect". Casper Star-Tribune. p. 1 – via Newspapers.com.

=== Web ===
- "2020 Congressional Voting Record" (PDF). Americans for Democratic Action. Archived (PDF) from the original on December 29, 2021.
- "Charles Hardy 2014 campaign finance". Federal Election Commission. Archived from the original on May 10, 2025.
- "Chris Rothfuss 2008 campaign finance". Federal Election Commission. Archived from the original on May 10, 2025.
- "Curt Gottshall 2014 campaign finance". Federal Election Commission. Archived from the original on May 10, 2025.
- Congressional Record: Proceedings and Debates of the 116th Congress, Second Session (PDF) (Report). Vol. 166. United States Government Publishing Office. February 5, 2020. pp. S937–S938. Archived (PDF) from the original on February 7, 2020.
- "Electronic Devices in the House Chamber". United States House of Representatives. November 21, 1997. Archived from the original on November 12, 2020.
- "Enzi: Federal Dollars Shouldn't Pay for Abortion". United States Senate Committee on Health, Education, Labor and Pensions. August 12, 2009. Archived from the original on July 26, 2026.
- "Guilty or Not Guilty (Art I, Articles of Impeachment v. President W. J. Clinton)". United States Senate. February 12, 1999. Archived from the original on April 14, 2020.
- "Guilty or Not Guilty (Art II, Articles of Impeachment v. President W. J. Clinton)". United States Senate. February 12, 1999. Archived from the original on November 12, 2019.
- "H.Con.Res.259 - Recognizing the 500th anniversary of the birth of Italian architect Andrea Palladio". congress.gov. Archived from the original on July 26, 2026.
- "Joyce Corcoran 2002 campaign finance". Federal Election Commission. Archived from the original on August 6, 2021.
- "Lifetime Senate Scores". Lugar Center. Archived from the original on April 30, 2026.
- "Michael B. Enzi". League of Conservation Voters. Archived from the original on July 30, 2026.
- "Mike Enzi". Ballotpedia. Archived from the original on May 5, 2023.
- "Mike Enzi 1996 campaign finance". Federal Election Commission. Archived from the original on May 10, 2025.
- "Mike Enzi 2002 campaign finance". Federal Election Commission. Archived from the original on August 6, 2021.
- "Mike Enzi 2008 campaign finance". Federal Election Commission. Archived from the original on May 10, 2025.
- "Mike Enzi 2014 campaign finance". Federal Election Commission. Archived from the original on May 10, 2025.
- "National Journal vote ratings". Ballotpedia. Archived from the original on November 7, 2022.
- "NRA Endorses Mike Enzi for U.S. Senate in Wyoming". NRA Political Victory Fund. September 10, 2014. Archived from the original on September 16, 2014.
- "On the Joint Resolution (H.J. Res. 114)". United States Senate. October 11, 2002. Archived from the original on August 1, 2021.
- "On Passage of the Bill (Passage of H.R. 2356)". United States Senate. March 20, 2002. Archived from the original on August 4, 2021.
- "On the Joint Resolution (S.J.Res.12 as Amended)". United States Senate. June 27, 2006. Archived from the original on August 2, 2021.
- "On the Joint Resolution (S.J.Res. 14)". United States Senate. March 29, 2000. Archived from the original on August 2, 2021.
- "On the Joint Resolution (S.J. Res. 23)". United States Senate. September 14, 2001. Archived from the original on August 5, 2021.
- "Roll Call Vote 109th Congress - 2nd Session". United States Senate. January 31, 2006. Archived from the original on March 15, 2025.
- "Roll Call Vote 111th Congress - 1st Session". United States Senate. August 6, 2009. Archived from the original on March 16, 2025.
- "Roll Call Vote 111th Congress - 1st Session". United States Senate. December 24, 2009. Archived from the original on May 2, 2025.
- "Roll Call Vote 111th Congress - 2nd Session". United States Senate. August 5, 2010. Archived from the original on March 16, 2025.
- "Roll Call Vote 115th Congress - 1st Session". United States Senate. April 7, 2017. Archived from the original on March 17, 2025.
- "Roll Call Vote 115th Congress - 2nd Session". United States Senate. October 6, 2018. Archived from the original on March 17, 2025.
- "Roll Call Vote 116th Congress - 2nd Session". United States Senate. October 26, 2020. Archived from the original on March 17, 2025.
- "S.130 - Powell Shooting Range Land Conveyance Act". congress.gov. Archived from the original on July 26, 2026.
- "S. 130, Powell Shooting Range Land Conveyance Act". Congressional Budget Office. July 26, 2013. Archived from the original on July 26, 2026.
- "Sen. Michael Enzi". Conservative Political Action Conference. Archived from the original on May 12, 2025.
- "Sen. Mike Enzi". Heritage Action. Archived from the original on February 24, 2021.
- "States in the Senate - Wyoming Senators". United States Senate. Archived from the original on May 10, 2025.
- "States in the Senate - Wyoming Timeline". United States Senate. Archived from the original on May 10, 2025.

Party political offices
Preceded by Alan Simpson	Republican nominee for U.S. Senator from Wyoming (Class 2); 1996, 2002, 2008, 2014	Succeeded by Cynthia Lummis
U.S. Senate
Preceded by Alan Simpson	U.S. Senator (Class 2) from Wyoming; 1997–2021; Served alongside: Craig Thomas, John Barrasso	Succeeded by Cynthia Lummis
Preceded by Judd Gregg	Chair of the Senate Health Committee; 2005–2007	Succeeded by Ted Kennedy
Preceded by Ted Kennedy	Ranking Member of the Senate Health Committee; 2007–2013	Succeeded by Lamar Alexander
Preceded by Patty Murray	Chair of the Senate Budget Committee; 2015–2021	Succeeded by Bernie Sanders
