= Charlie vs. Goliath =

Charlie vs. Goliath is a 2017 documentary film which follows Charlie Hardy, a former Catholic priest, as he runs in the 2014 United States Senate election in Wyoming.
