= Powell Shooting Range Land Conveyance Act =

- Long title: To require the Secretary of the Interior to convey certain Federal land to the Powell Recreation District in the State of Wyoming.
- Announced in: the 113th United States Congress
- Sponsored by: Senator Mike Enzi (R–WY)
- Number of co-sponsors: 1

Codification
- Acts affected: Recreation and Public Purposes Act, "Act of June 14, 1926"
- U.S.C. sections affected: 43 U.S.C. § 869 et seq.
- Agencies affected: United States Department of the Interior, Bureau of Land Management

Legislative history
- Introduced in the Senate as S. 130 by Mike Enzi (R–WY) on January 24, 2013; Committee consideration by United States Senate Committee on Energy and Natural Resources, United States House Committee on Natural Resources, United States House Natural Resources Subcommittee on Public Lands and Environmental Regulation; Passed the Senate on June 19, 2013 (Unanimous consent); Passed the House on September 10, 2013 (Roll Call Vote 452: 408-1)

The Powell Shooting Range Land Conveyance Act (S. 130) is a bill that would transfer some land that is current managed by the Bureau of Land Management (BLM) to the Powell Recreation District in Powell, Wyoming for use as a shooting range. A total of 322 acres of land would be conveyed. The bill would require the Powell Recreation District to pay all of the administrative costs associated with the transfer. The bill passed in both the United States Senate and the United States House of Representatives during the 113th United States Congress. The land in question has been used as a shooting range since 1980.

== Provisions of the bill ==
This summary is based largely on the summary provided by the Congressional Research Service, a public domain source.

The Powell Shooting Range Land Conveyance Act would direct the Secretary of the Interior to convey to the Powell Recreation District in Wyoming, without consideration, the land managed by the Bureau of Land Management (BLM) in the Wind River District and identified as the Powell Gun Club for use as: (1) a shooting range, or (2) for any other public purpose consistent with the uses allowed under the Recreation and Public Purposes Act. The bill also instructs the Secretary of the Interior to require the Powell Recreation District to pay all survey and other administrative costs necessary for the preparation and completion of any patents for, and transfers of title to, such land. The bill also requires the conveyed land to revert, at the discretion of the Secretary, to the United States if such land ceases being used for a public purpose.

Finally, in order for the deal to go through, the bill would require the Powell Recreation District to agree in writing to: (1) pay administrative costs associated with such conveyance, including the costs of environmental, wildlife, cultural, or historical resources studies; and (2) release and indemnify the United States from claims or liabilities that may arise from the uses carried out on such land on or before this Act's enactment.

== Congressional Budget Office report ==
This summary is based largely on the summary provided, as ordered reported by the House Committee on Natural Resources on July 24, 2013, by the Congressional Budget Office, a public domain source.

S. 130 would require the Bureau of Land Management (BLM) to convey 322 acres of federal land near Powell, Wyoming, to the Powell Recreation District. Based on information provided by the BLM, the Congressional Budget Office (CBO) estimates that implementing the legislation would have no significant impact on the federal budget. Enacting S. 130 would not affect direct spending or revenues; therefore, pay-as-you-go procedures do not apply.

The act would require the BLM to convey the affected lands, without consideration, to the Powell Recreation District, which currently operates a shooting range on those lands. Because the act requires the district to pay all administrative costs associated with the conveyance, the CBO estimates that implementing S. 130 would have no significant impact on discretionary spending. In addition, the affected lands are not expected to generate receipts over the next 10 years under current law.

S. 130 contains no intergovernmental or private-sector mandates as defined in the Unfunded Mandates Reform Act.

== Procedural history ==
=== Senate ===
The Powell Shooting Range Land Conveyance Act was introduced into the Senate on January 24, 2013 by Senator Mike Enzi (R-WY). It was referred to the United States Senate Committee on Energy and Natural Resources. On June 19, 2013, the Senate voted by unanimous consent to pass S. 130.

=== House ===
The Powell Shooting Range Land Conveyance Act was received in the House of Representatives on June 20, 2012. It was referred to the United States House Committee on Natural Resources and the United States House Natural Resources Subcommittee on Public Lands and Environmental Regulation. On September 10, 2013, the House voted in Roll Call Vote 452 to pass the bill 408-1.

== See also ==
- List of bills in the 113th United States Congress
- Bureau of Land Management
