= 2008 United States elections =

- ← 2006 2007 2008 2009 2010 → Presidential election year
- Election day: November 4
- Incumbent president: ▌George W. Bush (R)
- Next Congress: 111th

Presidential election
- Partisan control: Democratic gain
- Popular vote margin: Democratic +7.3%
- Electoral vote
- Barack Obama (D): 365
- John McCain (R): 173
- 2008 presidential election results map. Blue denotes states/districts won by Democrat Barack Obama, and Red denotes those won by Republican John McCain. Numbers indicate electoral votes won by each candidate.

Senate elections
- Overall control: Democratic hold
- Seats contested: 35 of 100 seats (33 seats of Class II + 2 special elections)
- Net seat change: Democratic +8
- 2008 Senate election results map Democratic hold Republican hold Democratic gain

House elections
- Overall control: Democratic hold
- Seats contested: All 435 voting seats
- Popular vote margin: Democratic +10.6%
- Net seat change: Democratic +21
- 2008 House election results map Democratic hold Republican hold Democratic gain Republican gain

Gubernatorial elections
- Seats contested: 13 (11 states, 2 territories)
- Net seat change: Democratic +1
- 2008 gubernatorial election results map Democratic hold Republican hold Democratic gain New Progressive gain Nonpartisan

Elections were held in the United States on November 4, 2008, during the war on terror and the onset of the Great Recession. It was considered a Democratic wave election, with Democratic Senator Barack Obama of Illinois defeating Senator John McCain of Arizona by a wide margin in the Presidential election, and the Democrats bolstering their majorities in both chambers of Congress. This marked the first time since 1992 that the Democrats won a Government trifecta, and they would not do so again until 2020.

Obama won his party's presidential nomination after defeating Senator Hillary Clinton in the 2008 Democratic primaries. With Republican President George W. Bush term-limited, Senator John McCain of Arizona won the Republican nomination in the 2008 Republican primaries. Obama won the general election with 52.9 percent of the popular vote and 365 of the 538 electoral votes.

Democrats picked up net gains of eight Senate seats and 21 seats in the House of Representatives on the back of Obama's coattail effect. They also won a net gain of one gubernatorial seat. The 2006 elections and 2008 elections represented the first time since 1936 that Democrats or any party made substantial gains in Congress in two consecutive elections.

This was the first presidential election year since 1964 when the Democratic Party won the White House and had coattails in the Senate and House of Representatives. The major theme during the campaign was the American public's general desire for change and reform from both Washington and the policies of President Bush. The economy and other domestic policies were also dominant issues, especially during the last months of the campaign after the onset of the 2008 financial crisis.

As of 2026, this is the last time the winning president’s party made net gains in the Senate, House, and governorships.

== Federal elections ==
=== President ===
Senator Barack Obama of Illinois was the Democratic nominee, and Senator John McCain of Arizona was the Republican nominee. Incumbent President George W. Bush was ineligible for re-election per the Twenty-second Amendment to the United States Constitution, which limits a president to two terms, and incumbent Vice President Dick Cheney declined to run for the office.

The 2008 presidential election was the first since 1952 in which neither an incumbent president nor an incumbent vice president was a candidate.

Senator Obama won the number of electors necessary to be elected president and was inaugurated on January 20, 2009.

=== United States Senate ===
The 33 seats in the United States Senate Class 2 were up for election, plus special Senate elections in Mississippi and Wyoming. The resignation of Mississippi Senator Trent Lott, and the death of Wyoming Senator Craig L. Thomas, both Class 1 senators, meant that both of those states' senate seats were up for election. The Democrats gained 8 seats, while the Republicans did not gain a seat.

=== United States House of Representatives ===
All seats in the House were up for election, including seats of the 435 voting representatives from the states and the 6 non-voting delegates from the District of Columbia and five U.S. territories. This marked the first time that the commonwealth of the Northern Mariana Islands selected a delegate to Congress.

Democrats won the nationwide popular vote for the House of Representatives by double digits, gaining 21 seats. They increased their total number of seats to 257, the largest number of seats held by either party in the House since Democrats lost control of Congress in the 1994 elections.

== State elections ==
Partisan control of state governments after the 2008 elections: Democrats maintained trifecta Democrats gained trifecta Republicans maintained trifecta Divided government maintained Divided government established Officially non-partisan legislature

=== Governors ===
Eleven of the fifty United States governors were up for re-election, as were the governorships of two U.S. territories. Eight incumbent state governors were running for re-election, while the retirements of Ruth Ann Minner of Delaware, Matt Blunt of Missouri, and Mike Easley of North Carolina left those gubernatorial positions open. The incumbent governors of Puerto Rico, Aníbal Acevedo Vilá, and American Samoa, Togiola Tulafono, were also up for re-election.

The only governorship that changed party hands was in Missouri: Democrat Jay Nixon was elected to replace Blunt, who chose to retire instead of seeking a second term.

=== State legislatures ===
Elections to state legislatures were held on November 4, 2008, alongside other elections, in which Democrats scored significant gains in a blue wave election. Elections were held for 85 legislative chambers, with all states but Louisiana, Mississippi, New Jersey, Alabama, Maryland, and Virginia holding elections in at least one house. Michigan and Minnesota held elections for their lower, but not upper houses. Seven territorial chambers in four territories and the District of Columbia were up.

The New Hampshire Senate saw the election of the first-ever female majority. This is the first time this has occurred in any chamber of any state legislature in United States history. In New York, the Democrats obtained a trifecta for the first time since 1935, and in Delaware for the first time since 1977.

The Democrats took control of six legislative bodies to the Republicans' four. Democrats took control of the Delaware House of Representatives, for the first time since 1985, the Montana House of Representatives, the Nevada Senate, and the New York State Senate, for the first time since 1966, the Ohio House of Representatives, and the Wisconsin State Assembly. Republicans took control of the Montana Senate; both houses of the Tennessee General Assembly, for the first time since 1870; and the Oklahoma Senate, for the first time in state history.

With the Montana Senate and the Montana House of Representatives flipping, this election cycle marked the last time in U.S. history as of 2026 where the upper house and lower house, held by different political parties in a state legislature, both flipped in the same cycle.

=== Initiatives and referendums ===
Vote for same-sex marriage ban by counties: 80–90% 70–80% 60–70% 50–60% Vote against same-sex marriage ban by counties: 70–80% 60–70% 50–60%

- State constitutional amendments prohibiting same-sex marriage are passed in three states: Arizona, California, and Florida. The measures in Arizona and California ban same-sex marriage only, while Florida bans both same-sex marriage and civil unions. California is the first state to ban same-sex marriage after having legalized it previously.
