= Chris Rothfuss =

American politician

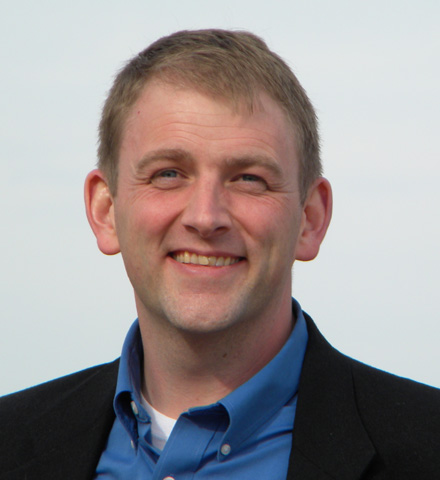

Minority Leader of the Wyoming Senate
- In office January 7, 2013 – January 14, 2025
- Preceded by: John Hastert
- Succeeded by: Mike Gierau

Member of the Wyoming Senate from the 9th district
- Incumbent
- Assumed office January 11, 2011
- Preceded by: Mike Massie

Personal details
- Born: October 21, 1972 (age 54) Ann Arbor, Michigan, U.S.
- Party: Democratic
- Spouse: Heather Rothfuss
- Education: University of Wyoming (BA, MS); University of Washington, Seattle (MS, PhD)

Chris Rothfuss (born October 21, 1972) is an American politician who served as a Democratic member of the Wyoming Senate, representing the 9th District, which is based in Albany County, since 2011.

== Early life and education ==
Rothfuss was born in Ann Arbor, and moved with his family to Marquette, Michigan, in 1976, and finally settled in Casper, Wyoming, in 1985. He attended Natrona County High School, where he graduated in 1990. Rothfuss received his PhD in Chemical Engineering and MS in Applied Physics from the University of Washington; and his MS in Chemical Engineering and BA in International Studies from the University of Wyoming where he competed as a member and captain of the Cowboy debate team. Following graduation, he took a position as a Science and Technology Diplomacy Fellow with the American Association for the Advancement of Science, and then joined the United States Department of State, where he was the U.S. lead for nanotechnology foreign policy, and delegate to the UN Committee on the Peaceful Uses of Outer Space. He worked as a chemical engineer on enhanced oil recovery projects around the world.

Since his family moved back to Wyoming, he began teaching courses in political science, international studies, and nanotechnology at the University of Wyoming. He is also a visiting assistant professor for the Honors College, an adjunct professor of international studies, and the director of the UW Summer High School Institute. He now lives in Laramie with his wife, Dr. Heather Rothfuss, and their 4 children.

== State Senate ==
Dr. Rothfuss was the Senate Minority Leader of the Wyoming Legislature from 2013 to 2025. First elected to the Wyoming Senate in 2010, he represents Senate District 9 in Laramie, Wyoming. The senator also co-chairs the Wyoming Blockchain Select Committee and serves as the ranking member of the Education Committee, the Minerals, Business and Economic Development Committee, the Management Council, and numerous other task forces.

In 2010, Rothfuss ran to succeed State Senator Mike Massie. He defeated Jodi Guerin in the Democratic primary with 61% of the vote, and was elected without opposition in the general election.

He ran for re-election to the Wyoming Senate to represent District 9. He won in the general election on November 6, 2018, with 96.6% of the vote.

While serving in the Senate, Rothfuss joined with Republican State Senator Hank Coe to sponsor legislation that would require "every Wyoming high school student to attend school through the 12th grade or until their 18th birthday, unless a parent agreed otherwise", which was prompted by the revelation that, although Wyoming spends nearly $16,000 per student, it has a low graduation rate. Additionally, Rothfuss suggested amending the Hathaway scholarship restrictions to "allow University of Wyoming summer school students to use the fund to pay for 3 credit hour classes." For the 2013–2014 legislative term, Rothfuss was selected by Democrats in the Senate to serve as the Senate Minority Leader.

== Key legislation ==
Wyoming Stable Token Act

During the 2022 Budget Session, Rothfuss and state senator Tara Nethercott, along with state representatives Mike Yin and Jared Olsen introduced a bipartisan piece of legislation titled the “Wyoming Stable Token Act". The bill would allow Wyoming treasurer Curtis Meier Jr. to create a state stablecoin pegged to the U.S. dollar. A Wyoming stable token is a virtual currency representative of and redeemable for a United States dollar held in trust by the state of Wyoming. Components of the act included rulemaking, report requirements, creating an oversight committee, providing for monitoring, as well as independent auditing.

DAO law

The Select Committee on Blockchain, Financial Technology and Digital Innovation Technology introduced SF0038, which passed on April 21, 2021. Known as the Wyoming Decentralized Autonomous Organization Supplement, the bill made Wyoming the first state to clarify the legal status of decentralized autonomous organizations by allowing Wyoming to recognize DAOs as limited liability corporations.

== 2008 United States Senate campaign ==
In 2008, Rothfuss announced that he would challenge two-term Republican Senator Mike Enzi. He defeated Al Hamburg in the Democratic primary with 62% of the vote. In the general election, however, Enzi defeated Rothfuss, receiving 76% of the vote to Rothfuss's 24%.

== Electoral record ==
2008

2008 United States Senate General Election
Party	Candidate	Votes	%	±%
Republican	Mike Enzi (incumbent)	189,046	75.63%	+2.68%
Democratic	Chris Rothfuss	60,631	24.26%	−2.79%
Write-in		269	0.11%	N/A
Total votes		249,946	100%	

2008 United States Senate Democratic Primary
Party	Candidate	Votes	%
Democratic	Chris Rothfuss	14,221	62.38%
Democratic	Al Hamburg	8,578	37.62%
Total votes		22,799	100.00%

2010

2010 Wyoming State Senate, District 9 Democratic Primary
Party	Candidate	Votes	%
Democratic	Chris Rothfuss	784	60.59
Democratic	Jodi Guerin	510	39.41
Total votes		1,294	100%

2010 Wyoming State Senate, District 9 General Election
Party	Candidate	Votes	%
Democratic	Chris Rothfuss	3,572	100
Total votes		3,572	100%

2014

2014 Wyoming State Senate, District 9 General Election
Party	Candidate	Votes	%
Democratic	Chris Rothfuss (incumbent)	3,182	100
Total votes		3,182	100%

2018 Wyoming State Senate, District 9 Democratic Primary
Party	Candidate	Votes	%
Democratic	Chris Rothfuss (incumbent)	1,032	100
Total votes		1,032	100.0%

2018

2018 Wyoming State Senate, District 9 General Election
Party	Candidate	Votes	%
Democratic	Chris Rothfuss (incumbent)	4,669	96.6
Write-in		165	3.4
Total votes		4,834	100%

2022

2022 Wyoming State Senate, District 9 Democratic Primary
Party	Candidate	Votes	%
Democratic	Chris Rothfuss (incumbent)	570	99.5
Write-in		3	0.5
Total votes		573	100%

2022 Wyoming State Senate, District 9 General Election
Party	Candidate	Votes	%
Democratic	Chris Rothfuss (incumbent)	3,221	62.9
Republican	Diana Seabeck	1894	37.0
Write-in		9	0.2
Total votes		5,124	100%

Party political offices
Preceded by Joyce Corcoran	Democratic nominee for U.S. Senator from Wyoming (Class 2); 2008	Succeeded by Charlie Hardy
Wyoming Senate
Preceded by Mike Massie	Member of the Wyoming Senate from the 9th district 2011–present	Incumbent
Preceded by John Hastert	Minority Leader of the Wyoming Senate; 2013–2025	Succeeded by Mike Gierau
