= Cliff Davis =

American politician (1908–1990)

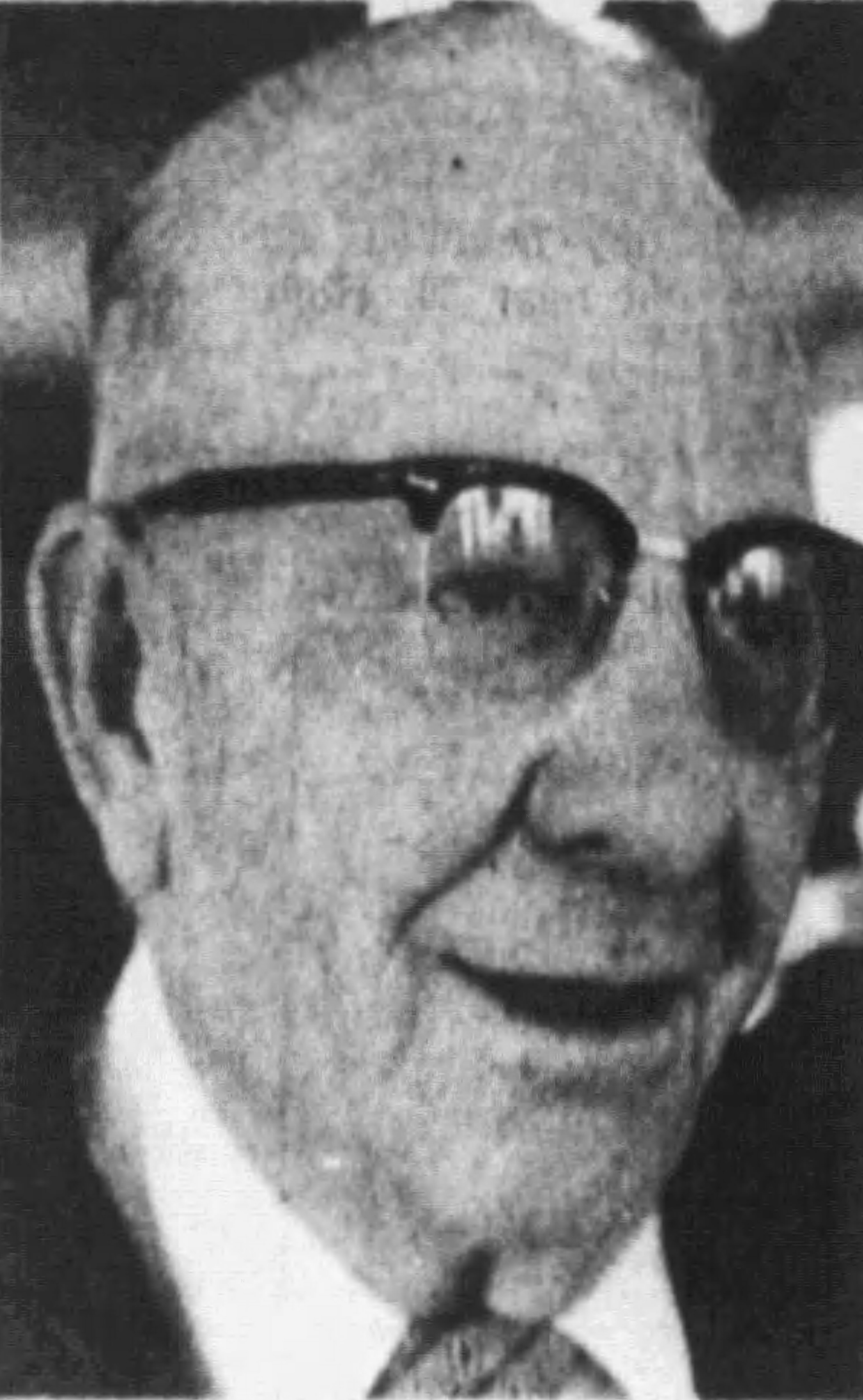
- Davis circa 1973

Speaker of the Wyoming House of Representatives
- In office January 1973 – January 1975
- Preceded by: Ward Myers
- Succeeded by: Harold Hellbaum

Member of the Wyoming House of Representatives
- In office 1957–1959
- In office 1961–1975

Mayor of Gillette, Wyoming
- In office 1971 – January 6, 1975
- Preceded by: Kelly Swenson
- Succeeded by: Mike Enzi

Personal details
- Born: January 31, 1908 Thomas, Oklahoma, U.S.
- Died: September 13, 1990 (aged 82) Gillette, Wyoming, U.S.
- Party: Republican
- Spouse: Elma Knoy
- Children: 3

Cliff Davis (January 31, 1908 – September 13, 1990) was an American politician who served as Speaker of the Wyoming House of Representatives and as mayor of Gillette, Wyoming, as a member of the Republican Party.

Davis was born in Thomas, Oklahoma, and his family homesteaded in Campbell County, Wyoming, in 1916. Their ranch grew to 4,485 acres and he operated multiple businesses. He served on the school board and county commission.

Davis served in the state house from 1957 to 1959, and 1961 to 1975. He served in multiple legislative leadership roles and defeated the incumbent mayor of Gillette in the 1970 election. He lost reelection to both the state house and mayoralty in 1974.

== Early life ==
Cliff Davis was born in Thomas, Oklahoma, on January 31, 1908, to J. Fred Davis and Josepene Stokes. Davis' family came to Campbell County, Wyoming as homesteader ranchers north of Gillette in 1916. J. Fred initially planned on buying land, but learned, while 40 miles north of Gillette, that the banker he received the loan from died. On March 1, 1927, he married Elma Knoy, with whom he had three children.

J. Fred moved to Gillette in 1939, and gave the ranch to Cliff. The family's ranch had 2,265 deeded acres and 2,220 leased acres. Cliff also operated a gas station, café, and bar.

== Career ==
Davis served on the school board and county commission of Campbell County. He was a delegate to the Wyoming Republican Party's convention in 1948.

During the 1954 election Davis ran for the Republican nomination for a seat in the Wyoming House of Representatives from Campbell County, but lost the primary to Ted Holdeman. Davis served in the state house from 1957 to 1959, and from 1961 to 1975. His campaign spent $53 in 1960 and $105 in 1970. He considered running for a seat in the Wyoming Senate in the 1972 election.

During Davis' tenure in the state house he served on the Agriculture and Rules committees and as chair of the Revenue committee. He served as majority whip. He was selected to serve as speaker pro tempore in 1970. He was selected to serve as Speaker in 1972.

Davis defeated Kelly Swenson, the incumbent mayor of Gillette, in the 1970 election. He served as acting chief of police in 1974. The town's population rose from 2,800 in 1967, to 9,500 in 1974, due to an oil boom and increased coal mining. Davis ran for reelection in 1974, but placed last behind Mike Enzi and James McManamen. Davis also lost in the concurrent state house Republican primary to Jack Mundell and Catherine Parks. Davis appointed McManamen to serve as acting mayor while he was on vacation in Africa.

== Later life ==
Davis bought the Green Trim Motel, which was operated by Elma from 1959 to 1961, and a Chevrolet in 1962. In 1978, he was submitted as a candidate to fill the vacancy in the Wyoming Senate created by John Ostlund's resignation, but Eric Ohman was selected instead.

Davis died at the Campbell County Memorial Hospital on September 13, 1990. His wife died on August 24, 1991.

== Electoral history ==
1970 Gillette, Wyoming mayoral election
Party	Candidate	Votes	%
Nonpartisan	Cliff Davis	1,245	70.06%
Nonpartisan	Kelly Swenson (incumbent)	532	29.94%
Total votes		1,777	100.00%
