= Freedom to Travel to Cuba Act =

Freedom to Travel to Cuba Act is the name of three bills introduced into the United States Congress which would allow U.S. citizens to engage in unrestricted travel to Cuba for the first time since 1963.

The first bill, H.R. 5022, was introduced into the 107th Congress House of Representatives in June 2002 by Sen. Jeff Flake (R-Ariz) with 37 cosponsors. The second bill, H.R. 874 / S. 428, was introduced into the 111th Congress House of Representatives in February 2009 by Rep. William Delahunt (D-Mass) with 179 co-sponsors, including Rosa DeLauro (D-Conn), Sam Farr (D-Calif), and Ron Paul (R- Texas), and into the Senate by Sen. Byron Dorgan (D-N. Dakota) with 39 cosponsors. The third bill, H.R. 664 / S.299, was introduced into the 114th Congress House of Representatives in January 2015 by Sen. Jeff Flake (R-Ariz) with 50 co-sponsors, and into the Senate in February 2015 by Rep. Mark Sanford (R-S. Car) with 46 cosponsors.

The 2002 bill was referred to the House Foreign Affairs committee and not introduced for a vote. The 2009 bill was referred to the House Foreign Affairs and Senate Foreign Relations committees and not introduced for a vote. As of December 2015, the 2015 bill has been referred to the House Foreign Affairs and Senate Foreign Relations committees, and is awaiting decisions by the committee chairs as to whether the bills will move past the committee stage. President Obama's three-day visit to Cuba, in March, 2016, marked the first visit by a U.S. president since 1928. On the island, anti-government demonstrations in anticipation of President Obama's visit and of the new U.S. liberalization of travel were met with oppressive reprisals from the Castro regime.

== Support ==
Democracy in Cuba is not the issue. The issue is what is best for America and not having individual rights suppressed by a handful of Batistianos. Can you imagine Taiwan telling America not to have normal relations with China? Why should that South Florida family feud influence anybody else's thinking?"

— Al Fox, president of the Alliance for Responsible Cuba Policy

By the end of the 111th congress, the 2009 bills had 220 Congressional signatories in the House and Senate. Florida attorney Tony Martinez has voiced support of the bill noting that "U.S. foreign policy shouldn't be manipulated to serve a political agenda", while noting that "the majority of all Americans want the ending of the embargo and the lifting of travel restrictions."

In July 2010, Newsweek magazine reported that a poll conducted by Andy Gomez, associate provost at the University of Miami, found that 64 percent of Cuban-Americans in Miami now support a unilateral lifting of the travel ban. However, until human rights violations on the island and democratic principles are reinstated, that community's support for the continuation of the embargo has not been significantly fading. In lieu of some change in perceptions, former Democratic Senator Gary Hart criticized the continuing embargo, remarking "second generation Cuban-Americans are finally beginning to change their community's attitudes and make it clear they no longer are interested in holding the mighty U.S.'s foreign policy toward a tiny nearby country hostage to their parents' anger."

In June 2011, former Democratic presidential candidate George McGovern spoke out against the travel ban before visiting Cuba, remarking:

It's a stupid policy. There's no reason why we can't be friends with the Cubans, and vice versa. A lot of them have relatives in the United States, and some Americans have relatives in Cuba, so we should have freedom of travel ... We seem to think it's safe to open the door to a billion communists in China but for some reason, we're scared to death of the Cubans.

McGovern blamed "embittered Cuban exiles in Miami" for keeping the embargo alive all these years, because of their dislike for Fidel Castro.

Bob Whitley, president of the United States Tour Operators Association, has supported the measures, remarking "if Americans don't like the policies of the government of a country, they can choose not to go. But a lot of people want to see Cuba because they've been denied the right."

== Opposition ==
For those who support the embargo and are opposed to the liberalization of travel, they state that democracy and human rights in Cuba. Significant opposition to the liberalization of U.S. travel restrictions exists both within the island of Cuba and the Cuban-American exile community.

Arguing against the future merits of normalization, José Azel, senior scholar at The Institute for Cuban and Cuban-American Studies, University of Miami and author of "Mañana In Cuba," has noted that while the percentage of foreign tourism is already twice as "American intensive" as China's, "neither country has engaged in political reforms." Furthermore, "In theory, at least, this means that the per-capita concentration of American tourists in Cuba is five times greater than that of Americans in China, and yet no democratic reforms are visible in either country." Mr. Azel thus asks: "What percentage of tourists must be American in order to validate the "American tourists will bring democracy" thesis?"

== See also ==
- United States embargo against Cuba
