= 2014 United States Senate election in Wyoming =

- November 4, 2014
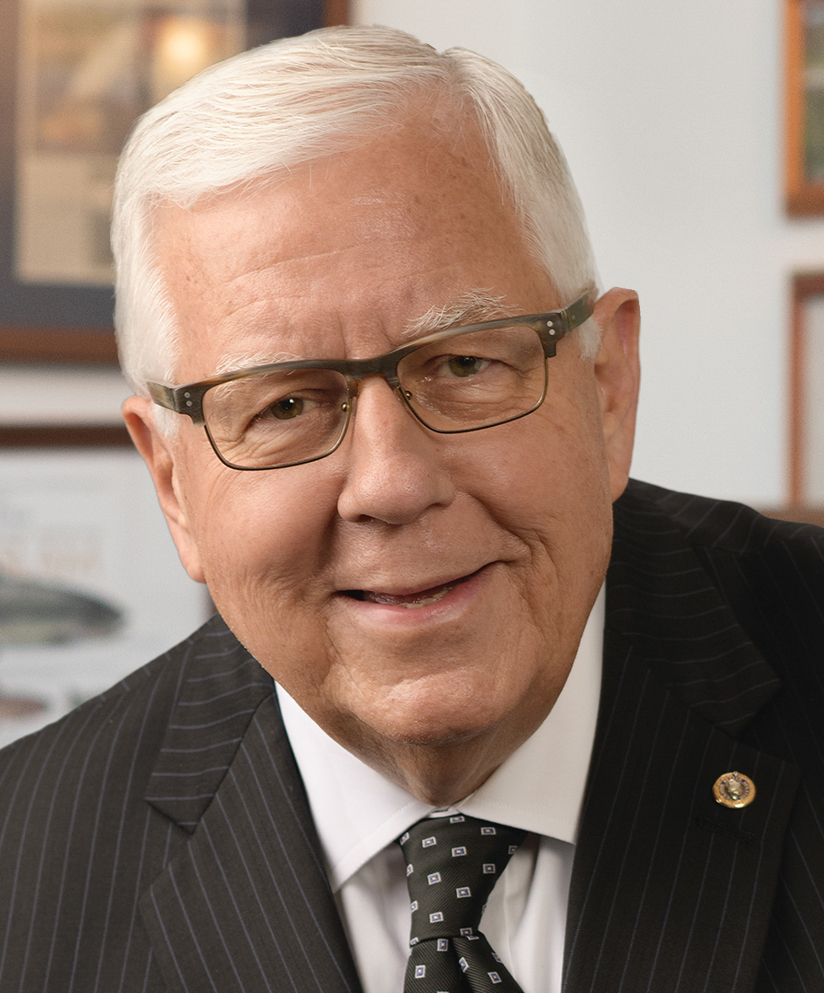

Nominee	Mike Enzi	Charlie Hardy	Curt Gottshall
Party	Republican	Democratic	Independent
Popular vote	121,554	29,377	13,311
Percentage	72.19%	17.45%	7.90%
- County results Enzi: 50–60% 60–70% 70–80% 80–90%
U.S. senator before election
Mike Enzi
Republican
Elected U.S. Senator
Mike Enzi
Republican

The 2014 United States Senate election in Wyoming took place on November 4, 2014, to elect a member of the United States Senate for the State of Wyoming. Incumbent Republican senator Mike Enzi won re-election to a fourth term in office. Enzi held Democratic nominee Charlie Hardy to just 17.4 percent of the vote – the lowest percentage of the vote for any major party nominee in Wyoming U.S. Senate electoral history out of the 39 races conducted during the direct election era.

== Republican primary ==
No incumbent Wyoming Republican senator running for re-election in the direct vote era has failed to win their party's nomination.

=== Candidates ===
==== Declared ====
- Thomas Bleming, former mercenary and candidate for the U.S. Senate in 2012
- Arthur Bruce Clifton, oil company worker
- Mike Enzi, incumbent senator
- James "Coaltrain" Gregory
- Bryan E. Miller, retired air force officer and energy consultant

==== Withdrew ====
- Liz Cheney, attorney, political commentator and daughter of Former Vice President and Former U.S. Representative Dick Cheney

=== Endorsements ===
Mike Enzi
- John Barrasso, U.S. Senator (R-WY)
- Roy Blunt, U.S. Senator (R-MO)
- Richard Burr, U.S. Senator (R-NC)
- John Cornyn, U.S. Senator (R-TX)
- Orrin Hatch, U.S. Senator (R-UT)
- Cynthia Lummis, U.S. Representative (R-WY)
- John McCain, U.S. Senator (R-AZ) and nominee for President in 2008
- Mitch McConnell, U.S. Senator (R-KY) and Senate Minority Leader
- Jerry Moran, U.S. Senator (R-KS) and Chair of the National Republican Senatorial Committee
- Rand Paul, U.S. Senator (R-KY)
- Richard Shelby, U.S. Senator (R-AL)
- Olympia Snowe, former U.S. Senator (R-ME)
Liz Cheney (withdrawn)

U.S. Ambassadors

- Mel Sembler, former Finance Chairman of the Republican National Committee, former Ambassador to Australia, former Ambassador to Italy

Individuals

- Tammy Bruce, talk radio host, conservative political commentator
- Sean Hannity, talk radio/television host, conservative political commentator
- Mark Levin, talk radio host, conservative political commentator
- Rush Limbaugh, talk radio host, conservative political commentator

=== Polling ===
Hypothetical polling

Poll source	Date(s) administered	Sample size	Margin of error	Mike Enzi	Liz Cheney	Undecided
Harper Polling	July 17–18, 2013	422	± 4.77%	55%	21%	24%
Public Policy Polling	July 19–21, 2013	780	± 3.5%	54%	26%	19%
Wickers Group ^	August 22–28, 2013	400	± 4.5%	61%	21%	18%
Wickers Group ^	October 25–28, 2013	400	± 4.5%	69%	17%	14%

- ^ Internal poll for the Mike Enzi campaign

Poll source	Date(s) administered	Sample size	Margin of error	Liz Cheney	Cynthia Lummis	Undecided
Public Policy Polling	July 19–21, 2013	780	± 3.5%	34%	41%	25%

=== Results ===
Results by county: Enzi: 70–80%; 80–90%

Republican primary results
Party	Candidate	Votes	%
Republican	Mike Enzi (incumbent)	77,965	78.51%
Republican	Bryan E. Miller	9,330	9.39%
Republican	James "Coaltrain" Gregory	3,740	3.77%
Republican	Thomas Bleming	2,504	2.52%
Republican	Arthur Bruce Clifton	1,403	1.41%
Republican	Write-in	346	0.35%
Republican	Over Votes	51	0.05%
Republican	Under Votes	3,973	4.00%
Total votes		99,312	100.00%

== Democratic primary ==
=== Candidates ===
==== Declared ====
- William Bryk, attorney from New York and perennial candidate
- Charlie Hardy, retired priest and candidate for Congress in 2012
- Al Hamburg, retired house painter, veteran and perennial candidate
- Rex Wilde, contracting company employee and candidate for governor in 2010

==== Declined ====
- Gary Trauner, businessman and nominee for Wyoming's at-large congressional district in 2006 and 2008

=== Results ===
Results by county: Hardy: 30–40%; 40–50%; 50–60%; Wilde: 40–50%

Democratic primary results
Party	Candidate	Votes	%
Democratic	Charlie Hardy	7,200	39.33%
Democratic	Rex Wilde	3,012	16.46%
Democratic	Al Hamburg	2,988	16.32%
Democratic	William Bryk	1,670	9.12%
Democratic	Write-in	216	1.18%
Democratic	Over Votes	31	0.17%
Democratic	Under Votes	3,189	17.42%
Total votes		18,306	100.00%

== Independents and third parties ==
=== Candidates ===
==== Declared ====
- Curt Gottshall (Independent), commercial airline pilot
- Joseph Porambo (Libertarian), cook at an assisted living home

== General election ==
=== Predictions ===
Source	Ranking	As of
The Cook Political Report	Solid R	November 3, 2014
Sabato's Crystal Ball	Safe R	November 3, 2014
Rothenberg Political Report	Safe R	November 3, 2014
Real Clear Politics	Safe R	November 3, 2014

=== Polling ===
Poll source	Date(s) administered	Sample size	Margin of error	Mike Enzi (R)	Charlie Hardy (D)	Other	Undecided
CBS News/NYT/YouGov	July 5–24, 2014	419	± 5.1%	66%	23%	5%	7%
Rasmussen Reports	August 20–21, 2014	700	± 4%	63%	27%	4%	5%
CBS News/NYT/YouGov	August 18 – September 2, 2014	350	± 8%	66%	21%	4%	8%
CBS News/NYT/YouGov	September 20 – October 1, 2014	264	± 7%	75%	17%	2%	6%
CBS News/NYT/YouGov	October 16–23, 2014	258	± 11%	67%	27%	0%	6%

Hypothetical polling

With Enzi

Poll source	Date(s) administered	Sample size	Margin of error	Mike Enzi (R)	Dave Freudenthal (D)	Other	Undecided
Public Policy Polling	July 19–21, 2013	1,203	± 2.8%	54%	31%	—	15%

Poll source	Date(s) administered	Sample size	Margin of error	Mike Enzi (R)	Gary Trauner (D)	Other	Undecided
Public Policy Polling	July 19–21, 2013	1,203	± 2.8%	66%	19%	—	14%

With Cheney

Poll source	Date(s) administered	Sample size	Margin of error	Liz Cheney (R)	Dave Freudenthal (D)	Other	Undecided
Public Policy Polling	July 19–21, 2013	1,203	± 2.8%	42%	45%	—	13%

Poll source	Date(s) administered	Sample size	Margin of error	Liz Cheney (R)	Gary Trauner (D)	Other	Undecided
Public Policy Polling	July 19–21, 2013	1,203	± 2.8%	49%	31%	—	20%

=== Results ===
2014 United States Senate election in Wyoming
Party	Candidate	Votes	%	±%
Republican	Mike Enzi (incumbent)	121,554	72.19%	−3.44%
Democratic	Charlie Hardy	29,377	17.45%	−6.81%
Independent	Curt Gottshall	13,311	7.90%	N/A
Libertarian	Joseph Porambo	3,677	2.18%	N/A
Write-in		471	0.28%	+0.17%
Total votes		168,390	100.00%	N/A
Republican hold				

==== By county ====
Vote breakdown by county
	Mike Enzi Republican		Charlie Hardy Democrat		Curt Gottshall Independent		All Others	
County	Votes	%	Votes	%	Votes	%	Votes	%
Albany	5,672	55.3%	3,276	31.9%	1,041	10.1%	274	2.7%
Big Horn	3,398	81.9%	351	8.5%	248	6.0%	254	3.7%
Campbell	8,903	83.6%	716	6.7%	703	6.6%	229	3.1%
Carbon	3,356	73.5%	820	17.9%	283	6.2%	110	2.4%
Converse	3,255	76.8%	384	9.1%	497	11.7%	101	2.3%
Crook	2,369	84.9%	196	7.0%	144	5.2%	81	3.0%
Fremont	8,629	70.0%	2,331	18.9%	1,123	9.1%	249	2.0%
Goshen	3,302	76.5%	511	11.8%	416	9.6%	88	2.0%
Hot Springs	1,529	75.1%	190	9.3%	248	12.2%	68	3.3%
Johnson	2,735	83.3%	320	9.7%	160	4.9%	68	2.0%
Laramie	17,647	68.2%	5,560	21.5%	2,043	7.9%	613	2.4%
Lincoln	4,758	82.0%	580	10.0%	304	5.2%	158	2.7%
Natrona	14,361	68.1%	3,387	16.1%	2,856	13.6%	471	2.3%
Niobrara	875	83.3%	84	8.0%	70	6.7%	22	2.1%
Park	7,695	80.6%	1,066	11.2%	523	5.5%	266	2.7%
Platte	2,625	74.0%	552	15.6%	284	8.0%	88	2.5%
Sheridan	7,307	76.5%	1,474	15.4%	557	5.8%	213	2.2%
Sublette	2,546	79.9%	416	13.1%	138	4.3%	85	2.7%
Sweetwater	7,656	68.0%	2,711	24.1%	636	5.6%	254	2.2%
Teton	4,261	54.4%	3,103	39.6%	261	3.3%	202	2.6%
Uinta	4,368	76.4%	892	15.6%	322	5.6%	134	2.3%
Washakie	2,280	79.9%	263	9.2%	253	8.9%	57	2.0%
Weston	2,027	81.6%	194	7.8%	201	8.1%	63	2.5%

== See also ==
- 2014 United States Senate elections
- 2014 Wyoming gubernatorial election
- 2014 United States elections
- 2014 United States House of Representatives election in Wyoming
