= 2002 United States Senate election in Wyoming =

- November 5, 2002
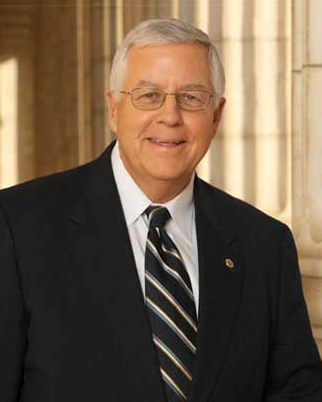

Nominee	Mike Enzi	Joyce Corcoran
Party	Republican	Democratic
Popular vote	133,710	49,570
Percentage	72.95%	27.05%
- Enzi: 50–60% 60–70% 70–80% 80–90% >90% Corcoran: 50–60% Tie: 50% No votes
U.S. senator before election
Mike Enzi
Republican
Elected U.S. Senator
Mike Enzi
Republican

The 2002 United States Senate election in Wyoming was held November 5, 2002. Incumbent Republican U.S. Senator Mike Enzi won re-election to a second term.

== Democratic primary ==
=== Candidates ===
- Joyce Corcoran, mayor of Lander

=== Results ===
Democratic primary results
Party	Candidate	Votes	%
Democratic	Joyce Corcoran	30,548	100.00%
Total votes		30,548	100.00%

== Republican primary ==
=== Candidates ===
- Crosby Allen, Fremont County commissioner
- Mike Enzi, incumbent U.S. senator

=== Results ===
Republican primary results
Party	Candidate	Votes	%
Republican	Mike Enzi (Incumbent)	78,612	85.87%
Republican	Crosby Allen	12,931	14.13%
Total votes		91,543	100.00%

== General election ==
=== Candidates ===
- Joyce Corcoran (D), mayor of Lander
- Mike Enzi (R), incumbent U.S. senator

=== Campaign ===
Enzi stated that his top priorities were education, jobs, national security and retirement security. He had $485,000 cash on hand in June 2002, when Corcoran first filed.

=== Predictions ===
Source	Ranking	As of
Sabato's Crystal Ball	Safe R	November 4, 2002

=== Results ===
General election results
Party	Candidate	Votes	%	±%
Republican	Mike Enzi (Incumbent)	133,710	72.95%	+18.90%
Democratic	Joyce Corcoran	49,570	27.05%	−15.17%
Majority		84,140	45.91%	+34.06%
Turnout		183,280		
Republican hold		Swing		

==== Counties that flipped from Democratic to Republican ====
- Albany (largest city: Laramie)
- Sweetwater (largest city: Rock Springs)
- Carbon (largest city: Rawlins)
- Uinta (largest city: Evanston)

== See also ==
- 2002 United States Senate election
