= Charlie Hardy (political candidate) =

American former Catholic priest (born 1939)

Charlie Hardy (born 1939) is an American former Catholic priest, educator, writer, and speaker. He has run for office as a Republican and Democrat in several elections in the state of Wyoming. His 2014 senate campaign is the subject of the 2017 documentary film Charlie vs. Goliath.

== Early life and education ==
Hardy was born in 1939 in Cheyenne, Wyoming. His parents were immigrants from Austria. He has four sisters.

Hardy received a BA in Philosophy from St. Thomas Seminary in Denver, Colorado. He then received a MA in Religious Education from St. Thomas Seminary. He received a MA in Education Administration from the University of Wyoming. He received a BA in Sacred Theology from the Catholic University of America.

== Work ==
Hardy was a Catholic priest for 29 years in parishes in Cheyenne, Laramie, Rock Springs, and Casper. He was superintendent of Wyoming Catholic schools.

From 1982 to 1993, Hardy was a missionary in South America, living for eight years in a cardboard-and-tin shack on the outskirts of Caracas.

In 1994, Hardy left the priesthood to marry Susana Gonzalez. From the marriage, he has a stepson. They divorced six years later.

In 2007, Hardy published the book Cowboy in Caracas: A North American’s Memoir of Venezuela’s Democratic Revolution with Curbstone Press. The book details his experiences in Venezuela. Saul Landau called the book “an antidote to the poisonous US government mantra against Venezuelan President Hugo Chávez. Ironically, Cowboy isn't about Chávez, but about the exciting processes he has helped initiate and about the awakening of Venezuela 's poor whom the US media neglects.” He wrote about uprisings in Venezuela in 1989.

After leaving Venezuela, Hardy had many different jobs, including drug testing those on board over 200 oil tankers, cargo ships, and platforms in the Pacific Ocean, Gulf of Mexico, and the Caribbean.

In 2011, he returned to living in Wyoming. In 2012, he started working as a substitute teacher for junior high and high schools in Cheyenne.

Hardy has traveled over a million miles on Wyoming highways, all 50 of the United States and over 30 countries.

== Political career ==
Hardy first had the idea to run for office after completing a 10-day retreat in which he took a vow of silence, only talking for an hour per day with a priest. Upon his return to Wyoming, he was shocked at the conditions of the state's working poor.

=== 2012 ===
In 2012, Hardy decided to run as an independent in the election for Wyoming's at-large congressional district. To get on the ballot, he needed 3,746 signatures, so he and 100 volunteers went door to door gathering signatures. The effort feel short by a few hundred signatures.

=== 2014 ===
In 2014, Hardy ran in the United States Senate election in Wyoming. He traveled around Wyoming in a repurposed 1970 Crown school bus with a small team of young volunteers.

During his campaign, Hardy supported abortion rights, equal pay for women, legalizing state same-sex marriage in the state, and raising the minimum wage.

Hardy defeated Al Hamburg, Rex Wilde and William Bryk in the Democratic primary, but he was defeated by Enzi in the general election.

Hardy raised approximately $50,000, mostly from people he knew. Enzi raised more than $3 million.

After his loss, Hardy stated that he believed that campaign finance reform in the form of federal funding for elections could have helped him win.

=== 2016 ===
In 2016, Hardy ran as Democrat for Wyoming's at-large congressional district. He was defeated by Ryan Greene in the Democratic primary on August 16, 2016. Liz Cheney won the Republican primary and won the seat.

=== 2018 ===
In 2018, Hardy switched parties from Democrat to Republican in order to run in the Senate primary against John Barrasso. He changed parties after becoming pessimistic that a Democrat could win in heavily Republican state like Wyoming. He called himself "Eisenhower Republican", referring to President Eisenhower, who warned against spending too much on the military industrial complex in his farewell address.

During his campaign, Hardy advocated for universal health coverage and a major increase in the federal minimum wage.

In a Q&A with Casper Star-Tribune, Hardy described healthcare costs, college debt, the difficulty of receiving a living wage from a 40-hour workweek, getting "big money out of politics", and focussing on peace building rather than further continuing the military-industrial complex as the most pressing issues for Wyoming and the United States. He called for decisions to be made on the local level as much as possible and that states should be consulted in how federal lands are administered but local politicians don't have final say.

He lost in the Republican primary on August 21, 2018. Hardy endorsed David Dodson in his bid against incumbent, John Barrasso.

== Charlie vs. Goliath ==
Hardy's 2014 Senate campaign is the subject of the 2017 documentary film Charlie vs. Goliath. The film follows Hardy and his team of four volunteers as their campaign tour makes its way around Wyoming, from the Tetons to Casper.

The film premiered at the Big Sky Documentary Film Festival in February 2017. It also screened at the Sun Valley Film Festival.

The film had its broadcast premiere on the PBS program America ReFramed on October 30, 2018.

== Personal life ==
Hardy has jogged 3 miles a day for over 30 years. He credits his good health to running.

== Electoral history ==
Democratic primary results, Wyoming 2014
Party	Candidate	Votes	%
Democratic	Charlie Hardy	7,200	47.7%
Democratic	Rex Wilde	3,012	20%
Democratic	Al Hamburg	2,988	19.8%
Democratic	William Bryk	1,670	11.1%
Write-in		216	1.4%
Total votes		15.086	100%

United States Senate election in Wyoming, 2014
Party	Candidate	Votes	%	±%
Republican	Mike Enzi*	121,554	72.19%	−3.44
Democratic	Charlie Hardy	29,377	17.45%	
Independent	Curt Gottshall	13,311	7.90%	

Results by county: Greene: 50–60%; 60–70%; 70–80%; Hardy: 50–60%

Democratic primary results
Party	Candidate	Votes	%
Democratic	Ryan Greene	10,955	53.17
Democratic	Charlie Hardy	7,868	38.18
Democratic	Write-ins	113	0.55
Democratic	Undervote	1,654	8.03
Democratic	Overvote	15	0.07
Total votes		20,605	100.00

Republican primary results, Wyoming 2018
Party	Candidate	Votes	%
Republican	John Barrasso (incumbent)	74,292	64.76%
Republican	Dave Dodson	32,647	28.46%
Republican	John Holtz	2,981	2.60%
Republican	Charlie Hardy (withdrawn)	2,377	2.07%
Republican	Roque "Rocky" De La Fuente	1,280	1.16%
Republican	Anthony Van Risseghem	870	0.7%
Write-in		267	0.23%
Total votes		114,714	100%
