= 1996 United States Senate election in Wyoming =

- November 5, 1996
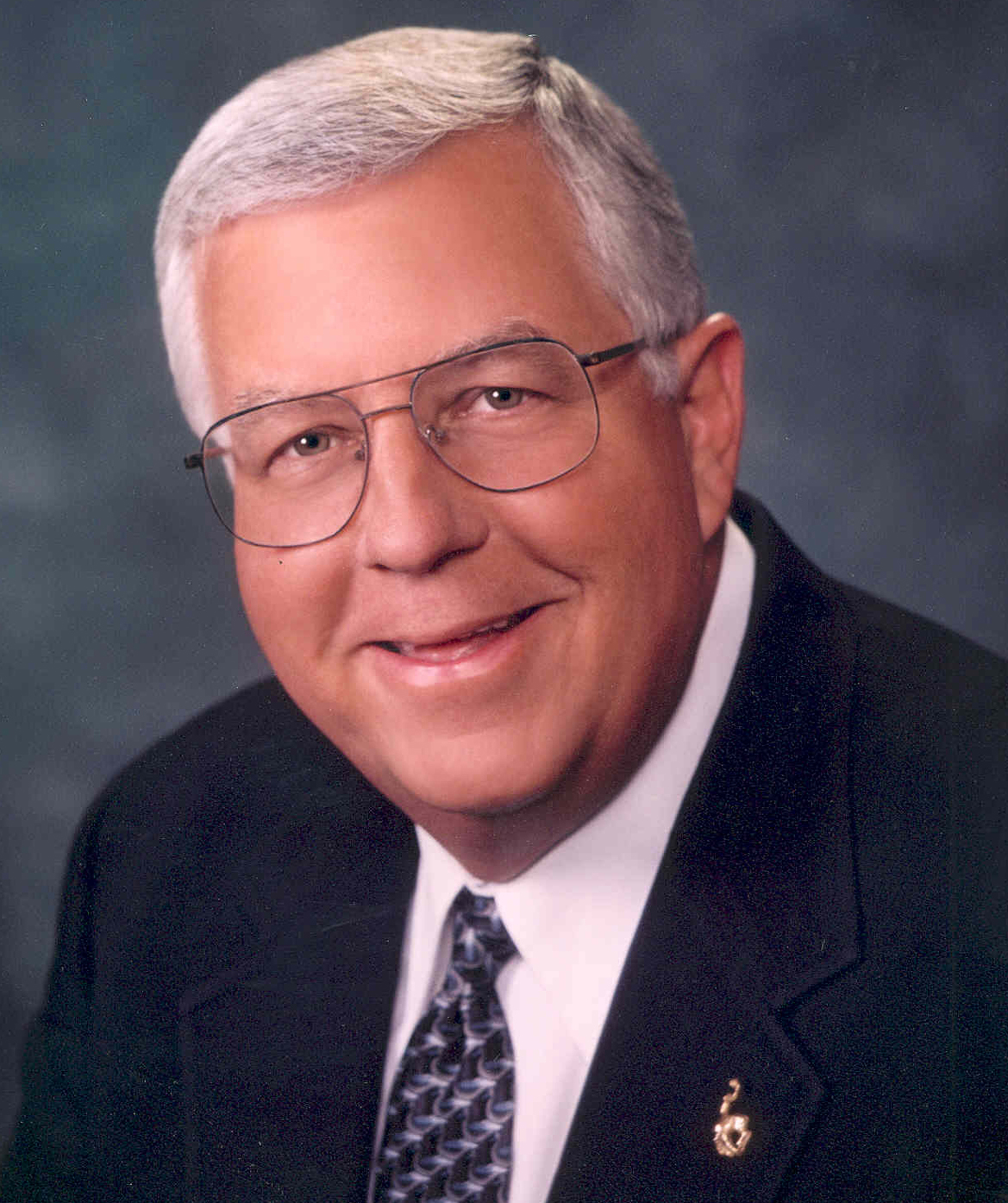

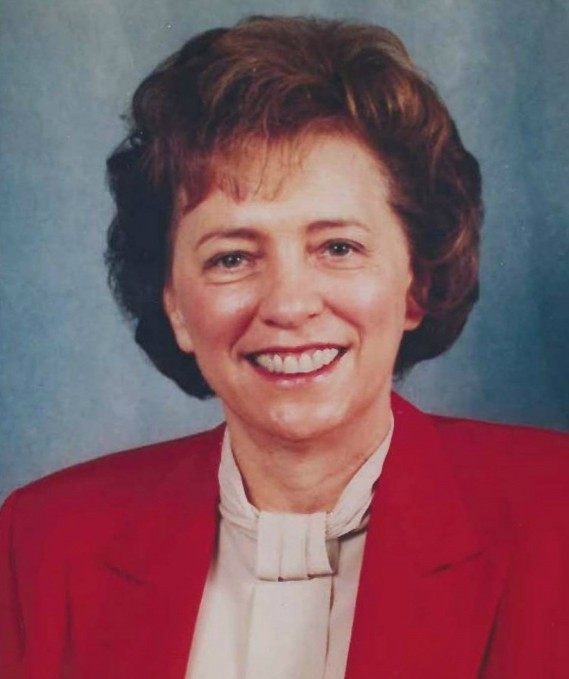
Nominee	Mike Enzi	Kathy Karpan
Party	Republican	Democratic
Popular vote	114,116	89,103
Percentage	54.06%	42.21%
- County results Enzi: 40–50% 50–60% 60–70% Karpan: 40–50% 50–60%
U.S. senator before election
Alan K. Simpson
Republican
Elected U.S. Senator
Mike Enzi
Republican

The 1996 United States Senate election in Wyoming was held November 5, 1996. Incumbent Republican U.S. Senator Alan K. Simpson decided to retire. Republican nominee Mike Enzi won the open seat. This is the last time a Democrat won 40% of the vote in an election for either of Wyoming's US Senate seats. Indeed, only two subsequent Democratic nominees were able to earn at least 30% of the vote: Gary Trauner in 2018 and James W. Byrd in 2026.

== Democratic primary ==
=== Candidates ===
- Kathy Karpan, former Secretary of State of Wyoming and 1994 Democratic nominee for Wyoming Governor
- Mickey Kalinay

=== Results ===
Democratic primary results
Party	Candidate	Votes	%
Democratic	Kathy Karpan	32,419	86.07%
Democratic	Mickey Kalinay	5,245	13.93%
Total votes		37,664	100.00%

== Republican primary ==
=== Candidates ===
- Mike Enzi, state senator
- John Barrasso, orthopedic surgeon, future US Senator, later appointed and elected
- Curt Meier, state senator
- Nimi McConigley, state representative
- Kevin Meenan, Natrona County District Attorney
- Kathleen P. Jachkowski, motivational speaker
- Brian E. Coen
- Cleveland B. Holloway
- Russ Hanrahan

=== Results ===
Republican primary results by county Enzi: 20–30%; 30–40%; 40–50%; 70–80%; Barrasso: 30–40%; 40–50%; Meier: 30–40%; 50–60%

Republican primary results
Party	Candidate	Votes	%
Republican	Mike Enzi	27,056	32.47%
Republican	John Barrasso	24,918	29.90%
Republican	Curt Meier	14,739	17.69%
Republican	Nimi McConigley	6,005	7.21%
Republican	Kevin Meenan	6,000	7.20%
Republican	Kathleen P. Jachkowski	2,269	2.72%
Republican	Brian E. Coen	943	1.13%
Republican	Cleveland B. Holloway	874	1.05%
Republican	Russ Hanrahan	524	0.63%
Total votes		83,328	100.00%

== General election ==
=== Candidates ===
- Mike Enzi (R), Wyoming State Senator
- David Herbert (L)
- Kathy Karpan (D), former Secretary of State of Wyoming and 1994 Democratic nominee for governor
- Lloyd Marsden (NL)

=== Results ===
General election results
Party	Candidate	Votes	%	±%
Republican	Mike Enzi	114,116	54.06%	−9.87%
Democratic	Kathy Karpan	89,103	42.21%	+6.15%
Libertarian	David Herbert	5,289	2.51%	
Natural Law	Lloyd Marsden	2,569	1.22%	
Majority		25,013	11.85%	−16.02%
Turnout		211,077		
Republican hold		Swing		

== See also ==
- 1996 United States Senate elections
