= Casper Star-Tribune =

Newspaper in Casper, Wyoming

- Type: Daily newspaper
- Format: Broadsheet
- Owner: Lee Enterprises
- Founder: J. Enos Waite
- Editor-in-chief: John Mangalonzo
- Founded: 1891 (as The Natrona Tribune)
- Language: English
- Headquarters: 100 N. Ash St. Casper, WY 82604; United States
- Circulation: 7,213 Daily; 9,149 Sunday (as of 2023)
- OCLC number: 9611324
- Website: trib.com

The Casper Star-Tribune is a newspaper published in Casper, Wyoming. It is owned by Lee Enterprises. It is Wyoming's largest print newspaper, with a daily circulation of 23,760. The paper offers print editions on Tuesdays, Thursdays, and Saturdays. The Star-Tribune covers local and state news. Its website, Trib.com, includes articles from the print paper, online updates, video and other multimedia content.

== History ==
On June 1, 1891, the weekly Natrona Tribune began publishing under the ownership of 20 men organized as the Republican Publishing Co. It was edited by J. Enos Waite, who moved the printing plant of the Bessemer Journal to Casper in order to launch the new publication. Waite left after nine months and was replaced by Marion P. Wheeler. In June 1893, Wheeler retired and was succeeded by a series of editors who each lasted a year or less: Alex T. Butler, W.E. Ellsworth, Ben L. Green, O.A. Hamilton, Fred E. Seeley, Frank H. Barrow and George P. Devenport.

In June 1897, Alfred J. Mokler, formerly with the Platte Centre Signal, bought the paper from Devenport. By then the paper was called the Natrona County Tribune. After eight years, in October 1914, Mokler sold the Tribune to J. Edwin Hanway. Two years later Hanway expanded the paper into a daily and renamed it to the Casper Daily Tribune on October 9, 1916. Business grew and Hanway commissioned a standalone building for the Tribune in downtown Casper called "Tribune Building", which was completed in 1920. A few years later, Max Levand sold the Casper Herald to Hanway in December 1925, who then merged it with his paper to form the Casper Tribune-Herald. In 1946, J.E. Hanway died, and was succeeded by his son Earl. E. Hanway.

On September 29, 1949, Alan Drey founded the Casper Morning Star. The 25-year-old editor and publisher was taken to the hospital a few months later after suffering a heart attack caused by extreme fatigue. In December 1950, Drey relinquished his post to Frank R. Wadell, and Drey left the business that March. Wadell was replaced by Earl J. Mason in February 1951. The companies that published the Morning Star and Tribune-Herald merged in September 1953, but each paper remained separate. In August 1954, E.E. Haway and his wife Sunshine Hanway sold their controlling interest in the business to Earl P. Hanway, Jack W. Perry, and Clark F. Perry.

In October 1961, Robert S. Howard bought the Tribune-Herald and Morning Star. In 1965, both papers were fully merged in June 1965 to form the Casper Star-Tribune. In 2002, Howard Publications and its 16 newspapers were acquired by Lee Enterprises for $694 million. In 2004, the company acquired The Casper Journal. In 2011, Star-Tribune added a metered paywall to its website. In 2018, the newsroom staff voted to unionize under the umbrella of The News Guild, becoming the first in Wyoming to do so. The Star-Tribune was the first newspaper owned by Lee Enterprises to have unionized while owned by the company. In August 2022, The Journal ceased. In June 2023, the newspaper reduced its print schedule to three days a week: Tuesday, Thursday and Saturday. Also, the paper switched from carrier to postal delivery. In April 2025, Lee Enterprises named John Mangalonzo as executive editor of the Star-Tribune.

== Awards ==
The Casper Star-Tribune regularly wins the Wyoming Press Association's "Deming Cup for General Excellence", awarded to the best large newspaper in the state, as well as other regional awards.

In 1985, the Star-Tribune was the runner-up for the Pulitzer Prize in excellence in public service journalism for its investigation of Northern Utilities Inc. The investigative series by Richard High, Anne Mackinnon and other staff found that the company was significantly overcharging natural gas customers in Wyoming due to an unfavorable agreement that Northern Utilities had entered into years earlier with its corporate parent.

In 1990, Washington, D.C. bureau reporter Andrew Melnykovych won the George Polk Award for Political Reporting for exposing how the federal government colluded with a dozen oil companies to reduce royalty payments to Wyoming.

In 1994, columnist Charles Levendosky won the H. L. Mencken Award for his opinion pieces in defense of the First Amendment.
