= List of perennial candidates in the United States =

List of political candidates who frequently run for office unsuccessfully

A perennial candidate is a political candidate who frequently runs for public office without a reasonable chance of winning. The term is the opposite of an incumbent politician who repeatedly defends their seat successfully. In the U.S., perennial candidates are often affiliated with third party politics.

Generally speaking, candidates are considered perennial if they seek a specific elected office or general high office (such as president, governor, congressperson or mayor) more than three times without success.

The United States, a representative democracy with low hurdles to running for elected office, has a long tradition of perennial candidates.

== American perennial candidates who have run for president ==
Candidate	Occupation	Current/final political party	Home state	Notable elections lost	Notable results
Jeff Boss	Conspiracy theorist, website owner	Democratic	New Jersey	3 presidential elections (2008, 2012, 2016); U.S. Senate (2008, 2014); New Jersey gubernatorial (2009, 2013)	8.3% in the 2009 New Jersey gubernatorial election Democratic primary
Harry Braun	Renewable energy consultant	Democratic	Arizona	4 presidential elections (2004, 2012, 2016, 2020); 2 congressional (1984, 1986)	Democratic nominee for U.S. House, Arizona district 1 in 1984 and 1986
Mark Callahan	Technology consultant	Republican	Oregon	2012 New Hampshire Republican presidential primary 2014 United States Senate election in Oregon; 2016 United States Senate election in Oregon; 2018 United States House of Representatives elections in Oregon	Republican nominee, 2016 United States Senate election in Oregon; Republican nominee, Oregon's 5th congressional district, 2018
John H. Cox	Businessman, real estate developer	Republican	California	Illinois's 10th congressional district (2000); 2002 United States Senate election in Illinois 2008 Republican Party presidential primary 2018 California gubernatorial election 2021 California gubernatorial recall election	Republican nominee, 2018 California gubernatorial election
Jacob Coxey	Businessman, landowner	Democratic	Ohio	1932 United States presidential election U.S. Senate in Ohio (1916, 1928); Governor of Ohio (1895, 1897); Congressman from Ohio (1894, 1922, 1924, 1928, 1936)	Mayor of Massillon, Ohio; Farmer–Labor Party nominee, 1932 United States presidential election
Eugene V. Debs	Trade unionist	Socialist	Indiana	5 presidential elections: 1900, 1904, 1908, 1912 and 1920	Indiana State Senate (1885–1889); 6% of popular vote, 1912 United States presidential election
Rocky De La Fuente	Automobile dealer	Reform	California	2016 presidential election 2017 New York City mayoral election 10 U.S. Senate elections since 2018; 21st California congressional district, 2020	Reform presidential nominee in 2016 and 2020
David Duke	KKK leader, political commentator	Republican	Louisiana	2 presidential (1988, 1992); 3 U.S. Senate (1990, 1996, 2016); 1 gubernatorial (1991); U.S. House (1999)	Louisiana House of Representatives (1989–1992); Top Republican: 1990 United States Senate election in Louisiana; 1991 Louisiana gubernatorial election
Joe Exotic	Animal park owner	Democratic	Oklahoma	2016 presidential election 2018 Oklahoma gubernatorial election 2020 Libertarian Party presidential primaries 2024 Libertarian Party presidential primaries	18.7%, 2018 Oklahoma Libertarian Party gubernatorial primary
Jack Fellure	Engineer	Republican	West Virginia	Every presidential campaign between 1988 and 2020	2012 Prohibition Party presidential nominee
Paul Noel Fiorino	Ballet instructor, museum director	Unity	Colorado	2024 United States presidential election Every Denver mayoral election since 2011; Every Colorado gubernatorial campaign since 2006	2024 Unity Party presidential nominee 5.6%, 2015 Denver mayoral election
Richard Grayson	Writer, performance artist	Democratic (1984, 2014-2016, 2022); Green Party (2010-2012, 2018, 2026); Americans Elect (2012); No Labels (2024-2025)	Arizona	1984 United States presidential election Florida's 4th congressional district in 2004; Arizona's 6th congressional district in 2010; 2012 United States presidential election Arizona's 9th congressional district in 2022; 2025 Arizona's 7th congressional district special election	Democratic nominee for Wyoming's at-large congressional district in 2014
Howie Hawkins	Political executive, blue collar worker	Green	New York	2006 United States Senate election in New York; New York's 25th congressional district (2000, 2004, 2008); 3 gubernatorial (2010, 2014, 2018); 2017 Syracuse mayoral election 2020 presidential election	2020 Green Party presidential nominee
Henry Hewes	Real estate developer	Democratic	New York	1989 New York City mayoral election 1994 United States Senate election in New York; 2016 Democratic Party presidential primaries 2020 Democratic Party presidential primaries	New York State Right to Life Party nominee for Mayor of New York City and U.S. Senate
Zoltan Istvan	Author and entrepreneur	Transhumanist (before 2017); Libertarian (2017-2020); Republican (2019-2020); Democratic (2025-present)	California	2016 United States presidential election 2018 California gubernatorial election 2020 United States presidential election 2026 California gubernatorial election	0.2% in the 2018 California gubernatorial election primary
E.W. Jackson	Minister, lawyer	Republican	Virginia	2012 United States Senate election in Virginia; 2013 Virginia lieutenant gubernatorial election 2018 United States Senate election in Virginia; 2024 United States presidential election	Republican nominee, 2013 Virginia lieutenant gubernatorial election
Bob Kelleher	Attorney	Republican	Montana	1976 Democratic Party presidential primaries 5 gubernatorial (1980, 1984, 1992, 1996, 2004); 3 U.S. Senate (2002, 2006, 2008); 1 U.S. House (1968)	Republican nominee for U.S. Senate in Montana, 2008; Democratic nominee for U.S. House, Montana District 2, 1968
Alan Keyes	Diplomat, political scientist, government official	Republican	Maryland	3 presidential (1996, 2000, 2008); 3 U.S. Senate (1988 and 1992 in Maryland, 2004 in Illinois)	5% in 2000 Republican Party presidential primaries 3-time Republican nominee for U.S. Senate
Gloria La Riva	Editor, activist	Peace and Freedom	California	Every presidential campaign between 1984 and 2020; 3 gubernatorial (1994, 1998, 2018); 1983 San Francisco mayoral election California's 8th congressional district (2008)	Peace and Freedom Party presidential nominee, 2016 and 2020
Lyndon LaRouche	Leader of the LaRouche movement	Democratic	New Hampshire	Every presidential campaign between 1976 and 2004	Founder of the LaRouche movement
Andy Martin	Journalist	Republican	New Hampshire	4 presidential (1988, 2000, 2012, 2016); 7 U.S. Senate (1978, 1980, 1998, 2000, 2008, 2010, 2014); 3 U.S. House (1986, 1992, 2018); 2 gubernatorial (1990, 2006); 1977 Chicago mayoral special election	1996 Republican nominee for Florida State Senate, District 35
Jimmy McMillan	Veteran, activist	Rent Is Too Damn High	New York	New York City mayoral (1993, 2005, 2009, 2013); New York gubernatorial (1994, 2006, 2010, 2014, 2018); 2012 Republican Party presidential primaries 2017 New York City Council election	Second place finisher, District 2, 2017 New York City Council election
Ralph Nader	Lawyer, author, environmentalist	Independent	Connecticut	4 presidential campaigns (1996, 2000, 2004, 2008)	3% of popular vote, Ralph Nader 2000 presidential campaign
Pat Paulsen	Comedian	Independent	California	Every presidential campaign between 1968 and 1996	1%, 1992 Republican Party presidential primaries 1%, 1996 New Hampshire Democratic presidential primary
Paperboy Prince	Artist	Democratic	New York	U.S. House in New York's 7th district (2020, 2022); 2 New York City Democratic mayoral primaries (2021, 2025); 2024 New Hampshire Democratic presidential primary	Second place, NY-7 Democratic Congressional primary in 2020, 2022
Joe Schriner	Journalist, rehab counselor	Independent	Ohio	Every presidential campaign since 2000	Candidate in the 2020 American Solidarity Party presidential primary
Jerome Segal	Philosopher	Democratic	Maryland	2018 United States Senate election in Maryland; 2020 presidential election (Bread and Roses Party); 2022 Maryland gubernatorial election 2024 Democratic Party presidential primaries	3.6%, 2018 Maryland U.S. Senate Democratic primary
Sam Sloan	Former broker-dealer, chess executive	Democratic	New York	2 Gubernatorial elections (2010, 2014); 2 Presidential elections (2012, 2016); 2013 New York City mayoral election 3 congressional elections (2014, 2016, 2020)	Second place finisher, 2014 New York congressional district 13 Democratic primary
Harold Stassen	Attorney, military officer, government official	Republican	Minnesota	Every Republican presidential primary between 1944 and 1992, except for 1956 and 1972; U.S. Senate (1978, 1994); U.S. House (1986); Governor of Minnesota (1982); Governor of Pennsylvania (1958, 1966); 1959 Philadelphia mayoral election	Governor of Minnesota (1939–1943); Chair of the National Governors Association (1942–1943); Delegate to the 1944, 1948, 1952, 1964, 1968, and 1992 Republican National Conventions
Jill Stein	Physician	Green	Massachusetts	2012, 2016 and 2024 presidential campaigns 2 Gubernatorial (2002 and 2010)	Member of the Lexington Town Meeting (2005–2010); Green Party presidential nominee, 2012, 2016 and 2024.
Vermin Supreme	Performance artist	Libertarian	Massachusetts	Every presidential campaign since 2004	2020 Libertarian National Convention, third place His running mate in the 2020 Libertarian primaries, Spike Cohen, became Libertarian vice presidential nominee in the general election
Randall Terry	Anti-abortion activist	Constitution	West Virginia	2012 and 2024 presidential campaigns New York's 26th congressional district (1998); Florida State Senate (2006); Florida's 20th congressional district (2012)	Constitution Party presidential nominee, 2024; 18%, 2012 Oklahoma Democratic presidential primary 13% in Florida's 20th congressional district, 2012
Norman Thomas	Minister	Socialist	New York	6 presidential runs between 1928 and 1948; 1 gubernatorial in 1924; 1 U.S. Senate in 1934; 1929 New York City mayoral election	6-time Socialist Party presidential nominee
Willie Wilson	Businessman	Democratic	Illinois	2016 Democratic Party presidential primary 3 Chicago mayoral elections (2015, 2019, 2023); 2020 United States Senate election in Illinois	3rd place, 2015 Chicago mayoral election and 2020 United States Senate election in Illinois
John Wolfe Jr.	Attorney	Democratic	Tennessee	2012 Democratic Party presidential primaries 2016 Democratic Party presidential primaries 2018 United States Senate election in Tennessee; Tennessee's 3rd congressional district (1998, 2002, 2004, 2010)	Second place finisher, 2012 Democratic Party presidential primaries

== Local, statewide and federal candidates ==
=== Northeastern United States ===
- Shiva Ayyadurai, an anti-vaccine activist and entrepreneur who claims to be the inventor of email, ran for the United States Senate twice in Massachusetts; he received 3.4% of the vote as an independent candidate in 2018, then lost the Republican nomination to Kevin O'Connor in 2020. He then mounted an independent bid for president in 2024, where he received the lowest number of votes of any third-party candidate in the election, with just 0.02%. He also announced a bid for Governor of Massachusetts in 2022, but never filed to run.
- William Bryk, New Hampshire retired attorney, won 2018 election to the Antrim Town Planning Board and 2023 election to the Contoocook Valley School District Board, formerly resident in New York, has run for multiple offices, including running for the U.S. Senate in 4 states simultaneously in 2014.
- Pasquale Caggiano, seven-time candidate for Mayor of Lynn, Massachusetts. Elected on his final attempt, but died three months into his term. He had previously served as a member of the Lynn City Council and the Massachusetts House of Representatives. Unsuccessful Candidate for the United States House of Representatives in Massachusetts's 7th congressional district in 1956, Lieutenant Governor in 1960 and 1962, Governor of Massachusetts in 1964 and the Massachusetts House of Representatives in 1968.
- Guy Carbone, a Massachusetts Democrat turned Republican, has run unsuccessfully for Northern District District Attorney in 1978 and 1982, Governor of Massachusetts in 1986, Massachusetts Attorney General in 1990, 1994, and 2010, the U.S. House of Representatives in 1996, the Massachusetts Senate in 1998, and most recently Selectman, Town of Belmont, Massachusetts. He also ran for governor in 1982 and 1990 before dropping out to pursue another office.
- Peter Diamondstone ran in many elections in Vermont from 1970 until 2016; he died in 2017. He usually ran under the Liberty Union Party, but occasionally ran in Democratic and Republican primaries.
- Michael Disney, formerly Michael Muniz, was a perennial candidate in Woonsocket, Rhode Island for many years. He legally changed his last name to Disney, reflecting his passion for The Walt Disney Company.
- Cris Ericson, Vermont
- Greg Fischer, has run, unsuccessfully, for elected office in New York 16 times. He has run for United States Congress (2020), New York State Comptroller (2014), New York State Senate (2008, 2010, 2016, 2018), Suffolk County Executive (2019), Riverhead Town Supervisor (2011), Riverhead Town Council (2007), Riverhead Town Tax Assessor (2013, 2015), and Riverhead School Board (2014, 2015, 2016, 2017, 2018). He generally ran as a Democrat, but at times ran on the Working Families, Riverhead First, and The Rent is Too Damn High lines.
- Althea Garrison has run unsuccessfully in multiple elections for the Massachusetts General Court, Boston City Council, and Mayor of Boston as a Republican, Democrat, and independent. Elected to one term in the Massachusetts House of Representatives from 1993 to 1995. As the runner-up in the 2017 Boston City Council election, she served one year on the Boston City Council to complete the term of Ayanna Pressley, upon Pressley assuming office in the U.S. House of Representatives in January 2019. Garrison was the first transgender or transsexual person to be elected to a state legislature in the United States.
- Robert Hagopian, ran unsuccessfully for public office in Hamilton, Massachusetts about twenty times. Previously served as treasurer of Watertown, Massachusetts from 1955 to 1967.
- Howie Hawkins, an activist and co-founder of the Green Party of the United States. Has run for office and lost more than 20 times, often in New York state.
- Robert J. Healey unsuccessfully ran for Governor of Rhode Island in 1986, 1994, 1998, and 2014. He also ran for lieutenant governor in 2002, 2006, and 2010.
- Abraham "Honest Abe" Hirschfeld, a New York City businessman, ran unsuccessful campaigns for the U.S. Senate in 1974 (defeated in Democratic primary) and 2004 (on a minor party line), for the New York City Council, for Manhattan Borough President in 1997, for Lieutenant Governor of New York, for New York State Comptroller in 1998, and for Mayor of Miami Beach, Florida.
- Lyndon LaRouche, a fringe political figure, ran for president of the United States in eight elections, beginning in 1976. He ran once as a U.S. Labor Party candidate and seven times as a Democrat. In 1992, he campaigned while in federal prison. Many of his followers have also run for office repeatedly, including Sheila Jones and Elliott Greenspan, both of whom made eight campaigns for a variety of offices.
- Steve Lonegan, a New Jersey Republican, was elected to three terms as mayor of Bogota, but has lost multiple bids for other offices. He was the unsuccessful Republican nominee for State Senate in New Jersey's 37th legislative district in 1997, New Jersey's 9th congressional district in 1998, a special U.S. Senate election in 2013. He also lost in the Republican primaries for Governor of New Jersey in 2005 and 2009, New Jersey's 3rd congressional district in 2014 and New Jersey's 5th congressional district in 2018.
- Andy Martin (also known as Anthony Martin-Trigona), a journalist and self-described consumer advocate has run for several local, state and federal offices dating back to at least 1977, including two runs for president and six runs for Senate. He has run as a Democrat, a Republican, and as an independent.
- Jimmy McMillan, founder of the Rent Is Too Damn High Party, has run for Mayor of New York City in 1993, 2005, 2009 and 2013, US Senate in 2000, Governor of New York in 1994, 2006, and 2010, and President of the United States in 2012.
- Marcus Morton, candidate for Governor of Massachusetts every year from 1828 to 1843. He won twice (1839 and 1842). His 1839 victory came in the closest governor's race in the United States history.
- Paperboy Prince, perennial candidate in New York.
- Sam Sloan, a polymath with interests in board games, obscure foreign languages, and over-the-counter stock trading, has run for Governor of New York in every election since 2006, for the U.S. presidency in 2012 and 2016, New York City Mayor in 2009 and 2013, New York's 15th congressional district in 2014 and New York's 13th congressional district in 2016. He has run as a Democrat, a Libertarian, and under various third parties.
- Gavin Solomon, a businessman from New York, filed to run simultaneously in 47 different elections to the U.S. House of Representatives - one per state - in the 2026 midterms, including Washington D.C. and four of the five territories (all except Puerto Rico). The only states he did not file to run in were Texas, Mississippi, Arkansas, Tennessee, North Carolina, Kentucky, Maryland, and Illinois.
- Jill Stein, a physician and member of the Green Party. Stein has run for Governor of Massachusetts in 2002 and 2010, president in 2012, 2016, and 2024, Massachusetts House of Representatives in 2004 and Secretary of the Commonwealth in 2006. She successfully won election as Town of Lexington Town Meeting Representative in 2005 and 2008.
- Milton Street ran for Mayor of Philadelphia in 2007, 2011, and 2015 (but withdrew in 2007 to run for an at-large City Council seat instead) and for US Congress in 1984. A businessman and activist, he was elected to the Pennsylvania House of Representatives in 1978 and the Pennsylvania State Senate in 1980, but lost his first reelection in 1984. He is the older brother of former Philadelphia Mayor John Street
- Vermin Supreme, former candidate for Mayor of Baltimore, Mayor of Detroit, Mayor of Mercury, Nevada, campaigned in the Democratic Party primary in 2004 and 2016, and in New Hampshire Republican Party primary in 2008 and 2012. He made an unsuccessful bid for the presidential nomination of the Libertarian Party in 2020.
- Norman Thomas was the Socialist Party's candidate for President of the United States on six occasions from 1928 to 1948 inclusive. He also ran for Governor of New York in 1924, for Mayor of New York in 1925, for New York State Senate in 1926, for Alderman in 1927, for Mayor of New York again in 1929, and for the US Senate in New York in 1934. Unlike most other perennial candidates, Thomas influenced American politics to a considerable degree with many of his policies being appropriated by President Franklin D. Roosevelt's New Deal.
- Lily Tang Williams ran for the United States House of Representatives in New Hampshire's 2nd congressional district in 2022 and 2024 as a Republican. She was also the Libertarian nominee for the United States Senate in Colorado in 2016 and a Libertarian candidate for the Colorado House of Representatives in 2014. She chaired the Colorado Libertarian Party from 2015 to 2016.
- Russell A. Wood, Massachusetts State Auditor from 1939 to 1941. Unsuccessful candidate for Massachusetts Secretary of the Commonwealth in 1911, 1912, 1913, 1914, and 1950, Middlesex County Register of Probate and Insolvency in 1924 and 1926, Treasurer and Receiver-General of Massachusetts in 1928 and 1930, Massachusetts Governor's Council in 1932 and 1934, and Massachusetts State Auditor in 1936, 1940, 1942, 1944, 1946, and 1948.

=== Southern United States ===
- Will Boyd, a pastor, has run for office in the state of Alabama five times in the span of ten years. He won the Democratic nomination in three elections: Alabama's 5th congressional district in 2016, Lieutenant Governor of Alabama in 2018, and the U.S. Senate in 2022; he lost all three general elections in landslides, receiving between 31% and 37% of the vote. He also ran for the U.S. Senate in the 2017 special election, coming in a distant fourth in the Democratic primary behind Doug Jones. He ran for Governor of Alabama in 2026, coming in a distant second in the primary and losing to Doug Jones once again.
- Gil Carmichael ran unsuccessfully for the Mississippi State Senate in 1966 and 1967, the United States Senate in 1972, Governor of Mississippi in 1975 and 1979, and Lieutenant Governor of Mississippi in 1983.
- Mike Causey, a North Carolina Republican, has run for state Insurance Commissioner five times between 1992 and 2016, losing each of the first four times in 1992, 1996, 2000, and 2012. In his 2016 campaign, his fifth campaign for the same office, he knocked off incumbent Wayne Goodwin in what was considered to be an upset, given his previous track record and Goodwin's incumbency. In addition to losing all of those statewide races for the same office, Causey has run and lost races for Congress and the state legislature. He's been described as the "Harold Stassen of North Carolina" regarding his continuous statewide losses for the same Council of State office.
- Audrey Clement, an environmental activist, has run for local office in Arlington County, Virginia over a dozen times since 2011, mostly as an independent candidate. In 2021, she became the subject of controversy when the Washington Post reported she had lied about her age to news outlets, claiming she was in her 50s when she was actually 72.
- David Duke, American white supremacist, activist, antisemitic conspiracy theorist, Holocaust denier, a convicted felon, and former Grand Wizard of the Ku Klux Klan. A former Republican Louisiana State Representative, Duke was a candidate in the Democratic presidential primaries in 1988 and the Republican presidential primaries in 1992. Duke also ran unsuccessfully for the Louisiana State Senate, United States Senate, United States House of Representatives, and for Governor of Louisiana.
- Joe Exotic is a former zookeeper and convict, known for his G.W. Zoo and made especially famous by the documentary series Tiger King. He has run unsuccessfully for public office two times notably and three times in total. Exotic first ran for President of the United States in 2016 as an independent and then for Governor of Oklahoma in 2018 as a Libertarian. Exotic filed to run for the Libertarian nomination in 2020 before his gubernatorial run.
- Jack Fellure ran for the Republican Party nomination in every presidential election from 1988 to 2016, and declared that he will run in 2020. In the 2012 campaign, he withdrew from the Republican nomination race, and become the presidential nominee of the Prohibition Party.
- Robin Ficker, a Maryland attorney who served one term in the Maryland House of Delegates and has run for office 21 times, including runs for Governor, Senate and 6 campaigns for U.S. House
- Jim Folsom, was the Governor of Alabama from 1947 to 1951 and 1955–1959. After being forced to sit out the 1958 gubernatorial election due to term limits, he narrowly missed the Democratic Primary runoff in 1962. He never got more than 3% of the vote at any point in the primary again, despite running in all five of the successive gubernatorial elections from 1966 to 1982. He also fielded unsuccessful bids for Public Service Commission in 1964, U.S. Senate in 1968, and for Democratic National Convention delegate in 1972.
- Ben Frasier, a South Carolina perennial candidate for Congress
- Gatewood Galbraith, a politician known for his outspoken advocacy of civil liberties and legalization of marijuana, ran unsuccessfully for state and federal offices in his home state of Kentucky no fewer than nine times. He ran twice for the U.S. House, once for state agriculture commissioner, once for the state attorney general, and five times for governor. His final run for governor ended less than two months before his death in January 2012.
- Alan Grayson, a Democrat, is a former U.S. representative from the state of Florida. He represented Florida's 8th congressional district from 2009 to 2011 and Florida's 9th congressional district from 2013 until 2017. Grayson then started an unsuccessfully streak of running for various federal positions from the state of Florida. He lost the Democratic Primaries for U.S. Senate in 2016, the 9th District in 2018, and for the 10th Congressional District in 2022. Grayson also withdrew his bid for U.S. Senate in 2022 in order to run in the 10th District. In 2024, Grayson withdrew his bid for U.S. Senate in 2024 and declared his candidacy for State Senate for the 25th District, finishing third in the primary.
- Calvin H. Gurley, an accountant who has run for elected office in the District of Columbia in thirteen elections between 1986 and 2020
- John Jay Hooker, a Tennessee Democrat, ran for several Tennessee offices, in later years mainly to gain standing for lawsuits against more serious candidates on the grounds of campaign finance violations.
- E.W. Jackson, a minister and lawyer, has run for office in Virginia on three occasions. He ran for the U.S. Senate in 2012 and 2018, coming in last in the Republican primary both times. At the 2013 Republican Party of Virginia convention, he won the nomination for Lieutenant Governor of Virginia in the 2013 election, but proceeded to lose the general election to Ralph Northam. He also attempted to mount a bid for President in 2024 as a Republican, but failed to get on the ballot in any state.
- Larry Kilgore, Texas
- Heerak Christian Kim, an educator, has sought office in Virginia four times since 2020. He ran for Virginia's 8th congressional district in 2020, 2022, and 2024, failing to win the Republican nomination in the conventions and primaries. He briefly ran for Virginia's 6th congressional district in 2026 before dropping out. He was previously the vice president of the Georgetown University graduate student government, where he was impeached for racist, anti-Semitic and other offensive social media posts.
- Basil Marceaux, during the 2010 election cycle filed as a candidate for the Republican nominations for governor in the Tennessee gubernatorial election and U.S. House of Representatives in Tennessee's 3rd congressional district. Before his 2010 candidacies for governor and the U.S. House, Marceaux had previously run as a candidate for the Tennessee State Senate three times, the United States Senate once and the Governor of Tennessee in three separate elections.
- James D. Martin, one of the first Republican politicians to make an electoral impact in the once solid-Democratic state of Alabama, ran for the U.S. Senate three times and governor of Alabama once in the 1960s and 1970s, and also unsuccessfully sought the office of state treasurer in 1994. By the time of Martin's 1978 Senate campaign, his opponent had already acknowledged him as the "Harold Stassen of Alabama."
- Peppy Martin, perennial candidate in Kentucky.
- Prince Mongo ran unsuccessfully for Mayor of Memphis, Tennessee ever since 1979. He has never won an election.
- George P. Mahoney, a building contractor who undoubtedly with his candidacies led to the creation of a future Vice President. Mahoney, a conservative Democrat from Maryland who ran for U.S. Senate in 1952, 1956, 1958, 1968, and 1970 and for Governor of Maryland as a Democrat in 1950, 1954, 1962, and 1966. Mahoney won the Democratic nomination for governor in 1966 with just 30% of the vote. U.S. Representative Carlton R. Sickles (30%) and Attorney General of Maryland Thomas B. Finan (27%) split the vote and allowed Mahoney, who ran on a segregationist and anti-open housing campaign to triumph. In the general election, Mahoney's slogan, "Your home is your castle; protect it", as well as his stance on many civil rights issues, prompted Baltimore City Comptroller Hyman A. Pressman to enter the race as an Independent candidate. Mahoney's controversial stances caused many liberals in the Maryland Democratic Party to split their support between Spiro Agnew, due to his pro-civil rights, socially moderate views, and Pressman. This split helped Agnew to win the election with a plurality, taking 70% of the black vote. Agnew in 1969 became Vice President of the United States under Richard Nixon.
- John Randolph Neal Jr. unsuccessfully ran for U.S. Senator 18 times, for Governor of Tennessee 9 times, and for the U.S. House of Representatives variously as a Democrat and Independent.
- John Raese, a Republican, unsuccessfully ran for the U.S. Senate from West Virginia in 1984, 2006, 2010, and 2012. Raese also ran for Governor in 1988, but lost the Republican primary.
- Jim Rogers, an Oklahoma Democrat notorious for his secrecy and almost complete lack of campaigning, ran for the state's two U.S. Senate seats every election from 2002 to 2014, serving as the Democratic nominee in the 2010 U.S. Senate election. He died less than two weeks after his last race in 2012; Rogers also ran in the 2012 Oklahoma Democratic presidential primary, finishing in third place with 15% of the vote.
- Chuck Smith, an attorney and former chair of the Virginia Beach Republican Party, was the Republican nominee for Virginia's 3rd congressional district in 2010, losing to incumbent Democrat Bobby Scott with just 27% of the vote. He ran twice for Attorney General of Virginia; he failed to qualify for the ballot in 2017, and was narrowly defeated in 2021 by Jason Miyares on the final ballot of the convention. He then ran for the U.S. Senate twice, coming in fourth out of five candidates in the primary in 2024, and then running again before dropping out in 2026.
- Annette Taddeo is a Democratic politician in South Florida who has run for numerous positions in the national, state, and local governments. She has unsuccessfully run for the U.S. House of Representatives in 2008, 2016, and 2022; She won the Democratic nominations in both 2008 and 2022 but not in 2016, losing to Joe Garcia, who himself lost to Republican Carlos Curbelo in the general election. In 2010, after losing to Republican U.S. Representative Ileana Ros-Lehtinen, she ran for the Miami-Dade County Commission. She placed third in the nonpartisan primary. In 2014, she was the Democratic nominee for Lieutenant Governor, with former Governor Charlie Crist as her running mate. They were defeated by incumbent Republicans Rick Scott and Carlos Lopez-Cantera. Her only successful elections thus far were the 2017 special election for the Florida Senate in District 40, and her re-election to the position the following year in 2018. She had initially run for Governor of Florida in 2022 but withdrew and chose to run for Congress instead, losing to incumbent Republican Maria Elvira Salazar in the general election. She is currently running for Miami-Dade County Clerk and Comptroller.
- Randall Terry is an anti-abortion activist who has run for numerous positions in the national and state governments, including for the presidency. He is notorious for getting glitterbombed by candidate Vermin Supreme at the 2012 lesser-known Democratic presidential debate.
- Jay Wolfe was elected to one term in the West Virginia State Senate, but unsuccessfully ran for the U.S. Senate from West Virginia as the Republican nominee in 1988, 2002, and 2008.
- Geoff Young, perennial candidate in Kentucky.

=== Midwestern United States ===
- Jacob Coxey best known for his 1894 March on Washington DC, Coxey ran 3 times for US Senate for Ohio, and twice as the People's Party nominee for Governor of Ohio in 1895 and 1897. Coxey also was the Mayor of Massilon, OH from 1931 to 1933 in addition to losing numerous congressional races.
- Eugene V. Debs was a presidential candidate for the Social Democratic Party in 1900 and thereafter for the Socialist Party in four more elections: 1904, 1908, 1912, and 1920. In the 1920 election, while in federal prison for violating the Espionage Act of 1917 with a speech opposing the draft, he received 913,664 votes, the most ever for a Socialist Party presidential candidate.
- Alan Keyes, former assistant secretary of state and conservative activist, ran for President of the United States in 1996, 2000, and 2008. He was the Republican nominee for the U.S. Senate in Maryland against Paul Sarbanes in 1988 and Barbara Mikulski in 1992, as well as in Illinois against Barack Obama in 2004. Keyes lost all three elections by wide margins.
- Andrew Jones, a utility executive, has repeatedly run for office in the St. Louis area as a Republican. He twice ran for Mayor of St. Louis, winning the nomination in 2017 while losing the primary in 2021. He then ran for Congress in Missouri's 1st congressional district in 2022 and 2024, winning the nomination both times but losing to then-incumbent Representative Cori Bush and Wesley Bell, respectively.
- Arthur J. Jones is a Neo-Nazi who unsuccessfully pursued the Republican nomination in Illinois's 3rd congressional district seven times since 1984 before winning the nomination unopposed in 2018, and then losing in the general election. His candidacy was strongly denounced by national and local party officials. Additionally, he has lost bids for Mayor of Milwaukee, Mayor of Chicago, and Chicago City Council.
- Jim Oberweis, a dairy magnate, has run for office in Illinois multiple times. He lost in the Republican primaries for the U.S. Senate in 2002, 2004 and Governor in 2006, and was the unsuccessful Republican nominee for the special and regular elections in Illinois's 14th congressional district in 2008 and 2020 and the U.S. Senate in 2014. He was eventually elected to the Illinois Senate in 2012 and reelected in 2016.
- Claude R. Porter unsuccessfully ran as a Democrat three times for Iowa governor and six times for U.S. senator.
- Roland Riemers, a North Dakotan who has run for state house twice, congress twice (1972, 2020), U.S. Senate twice (1976, 2006), Governor twice (2004, 2012), North Dakota Secretary of State (2014), and North Dakota State Auditor (2016). He is most notable for winning the 1996 North Dakota Democratic presidential primary when President Clinton did not appear on the ballot due to a dispute between the state and national Democratic parties.
- Harold Stassen is one of the most famous and distinguished perennial presidential candidates in U.S. history, along with Ralph Nader. A one-time governor of Minnesota and former president of the University of Pennsylvania, he ran for the Republican nomination for president nine times between 1944 and 1992. While Stassen was considered a serious candidate in 1944, 1948, and 1952, his persistent attempts were increasingly met with derision and then amusement as the decades progressed. He also ran in 10 other races for lower offices.
- Leonard Steinman, a native of Jefferson City, Missouri who ran for president, U.S. Senate, twice for Governor, 3 times for U.S. House, 1 time for State House, twice for mayor and twice for city council, never winning.
- Rick Stewart, founder of Frontier Natural Products Co-Op, has run unsuccessfully in Iowa for U.S. Senate (2014, 2020), Linn County Sheriff (2016), Secretary of Agriculture (2018), and governor (2022).
- Bob Vander Plaats ran unsuccessfully for Governor of Iowa in 2002, 2006, and 2010 and lost as nominee for Lieutenant Governor of Iowa in 2006.
- Willie Wilson, a businessman from Chicago, has unsuccessfully run three times for mayor of his home city. He also ran in the Democratic primary for president in 2016 and as a third-party candidate for United States Senate in 2020.

=== Western United States ===
- Mohammad Arif, an immigrants organizer, has run for office multiple times in Arizona and California since 2010, running with left-wing parties such as the Democratic Party, the Green Party, and the Peace and Freedom Party. He came in last place in the Peace and Freedom primary for Governor of California in 2010, the 2013 special election for California's 16th senatorial district, and the 2018 general election for Arizona's 11th legislative district. He came in second-to-last place in the special election for the U.S. Senate in Arizona in 2020 as a write-in candidate after withdrawing from the Democratic primary, then came in 6th place out of 9 candidates in the primary for Lieutenant Governor of California in 2022. He ran for Governor of California as a Democrat in 2026, receiving less than 0.1% of the vote in the primary.
- Joan Jett Blakk, an activist and drag queen. Blakk ran for mayor of Chicago in 1991, president in 1992 and 1996, and mayor of San Francisco in 1999. Blakk was affiliated with the Queer Nation activist organization.
- Edgar Blatchford served as mayor of Seward, Alaska from 1999 through 2003, and has run unsuccessful campaigns for U.S. Senate in Alaska in 2016, 2020 and 2022 as well as for Lieutenant Governor in 2018.
- James P. Bradley, a Republican healthcare executive, has run for office in California four times since 2018. He ran for the United States Senate three times, in 2018, 2022, and 2024; he came in third in the blanket primaries in 2018 and the 2022 special election, in both cases narrowly missing out on advancing to the general election, while he came in sixth place in both of the regular elections in 2022 and 2024. He was also the Republican nominee for California's 33rd congressional district in 2020.
- Mark Callahan has sought numerous offices under several parties since 2009, including the Oregon House of Representatives, the United States House of Representatives, the United States Senate, several boards of education, and President of the United States. As of April 2020, his sole victories in a contested election were the Republican primary for the U.S. Senate from Oregon in 2016 and the Republican Primary for Oregon's Fourth Congressional District in 2018. He subsequently lost both general elections.
- Ammar Campa-Najjar has run for office in San Diego County, including three failed bids for the U.S. House of Representatives. In 2018 and 2020, he was the Democratic nominee for California's 50th congressional district, losing to incumbent Duncan D. Hunter and former Representative Darrell Issa, respectively. He was also the runner-up for Mayor of Chula Vista in 2022. In a third attempt at the U.S. House in the 48th district in 2026, he came in a distant third in the primary and failed to advance to the runoff.
- Mike Cargile, an independent filmmaker, was the Republican nominee for California's 35th congressional district three consecutive times, in 2020, 2022, and 2024, losing to incumbent Representative Norma Torres every time. He also ran for Chairman of the California Republican Party in 2023, losing to incumbent Chairwoman Jessica Patterson.
- John Carroll served four terms in the Hawaii House of Representatives and one term in the Hawaii Senate, but also ran unsuccessfully for Governor of Hawaii in 2002, 2010, and 2018, for the United States House of Representatives in 1966 and 2002, and for the United States Senate in 2000, 2012, and 2016.
- Campbell Cavasso served three terms in the Hawaii House of Representatives, but unsuccessfully ran for Lieutenant Governor of Hawaii in 2002, the United States Senate in 2004, 2010, and 2014, and for the United States House of Representatives in 2018.
- Greg Conlon, a certified public accountant (CPA), has run for office in California on ten occasions from 2002 to 2024. This includes three bids for California State Treasurer in 2002, 2014, and 2018, two bids for the U.S. Senate in 2012 and 2016, two bids for California's 12th congressional district in both the special election and general election in 2008, California's 21st State Assembly district in 2010, California Insurance Commissioner in 2022, and a seat on the Menlo Park city council in 2024. Of the nine partisan races in which he has run (excluding the city council race), he won the Republican nomination in six elections, advancing to the general elections in every case except for his two Senate races and his Insurance Commissioner race.
- John H. Cox, a Republican talk radio host, has run for various positions in his home state of Illinois including U.S. Congress, U.S. Senate, and Cook County Recorder of Deeds, the latter in an attempt to eliminate the position; which he saw as unnecessary. Cox ran unsuccessfully for the 2008 Republican nomination for President of the United States. He was the Republican nominee in the 2018 California gubernatorial election after placing second in the nonpartisan blanket primary, losing the general election to Democrat Gavin Newsom. He ran for governor once again in the 2021 recall election, coming in fifth place among all replacement candidates.
- Earl Dodge, a long-time activist in the temperance movement, was the Prohibition Party's presidential candidate in six consecutive elections, from 1984 to 2004. He was also that party's vice-presidential candidate in 1976 and 1980. He ran for Governor of Colorado on five occasions (1970, 1974, 1982, 1986, and 1994) as well. He also ran for senator of Kansas in 1966.
- Eric Early is an attorney who has run for office in California multiple times, including for Attorney General of California in 2018 and 2022, the U.S. Senate in 2024, and California's 28th congressional district in 2020. He was the runner-up for the Republican nomination in both of his Attorney General races, while he won the nomination but lost in a landslide to then-Representative Adam Schiff in his congressional race. He came in fifth place in both the regular and special primary elections for the Senate in 2024, again losing to Schiff.
- Justin Fareed, a Republican businessman, ran for California's 24th congressional district on three occasions in 2014, 2016, and 2018. He lost the nomination in 2014 but advanced to the general election in 2016 and 2018, losing to Salud Carbajal both times.
- Steve Fox, a former public school teacher and attorney, ran for office in California six times in a 14-year timespan. His first campaign was for California's 36th State Assembly district in 2008, when he lost the Republican primary to Steve Knight. Fox then switched to the Democratic Party for all future campaigns. Fox ran for the 36th district again in 2012, narrowly winning the general election against Republican Ron Smith by 145 votes. After serving just one term, he was defeated in the 2014 election by Republican Tom Lackey in a landslide. Fox then tried to challenge Lackey in 2016, 2018, and 2020, advancing to the runoff but losing the general election every time. In 2022, he ran for the 39th Assembly district, coming in last place in the primary.
- Rocky De La Fuente has unsuccessfully run for President of the United States on multiple tickets, for senate in nine states in the same election and for the Mayor of New York, and has never been elected to any office.
- Goodspaceguy, who legally changed his name from Michael George Nelson, has run for local, state, and federal office in Washington state more than a dozen times.
- Richard Grayson, a writer and performance artist, has run for multiple political offices since the 1980s, mostly running write-in campaigns. He first ran for president as a Democrat in 1984, then ran for Congress three times in Florida from 1994 to 2004. He then ran for office in Arizona, primarily with the Green Party, on seven occasions from 2010 to 2025. His most successful campaign was in 2014, when he won the Democratic nomination for Wyoming's at-large congressional district; he went on to lose the general election in a landslide to incumbent Cynthia Lummis, receiving less than 23% of the vote in the general election.
- Eddie Hamilton, a Nevada Republican, runs on an almost yearly basis. He has run for Nevada's 1st Congressional District in 2008, Governor of Nevada in 2014, Henderson City Council in 2011 and 2015, US Senate in 2006, 2010 (as a Democrat), 2012 and 2016, Mayor of Henderson in 2013 and 2017. Each time he runs, he uses a different nickname such as "Fast Eddie", "Mr. Clean" "In Liberty" and "Swamper".
- Zoltan Istvan has run for President of the United States and Governor of California twice each, running with a different party each time. He founded the Transhumanist Party and ran for president as its nominee in 2016. He then switched to the Libertarian Party to run for governor, receiving just 0.2% in the primary and coming in 15th place out of 27 candidates. He then switched to the Republican Party to seek the party's nomination in the 2020 presidential election, receiving just 0.07% of the vote in the primaries. He switched yet again to the Democratic Party to run for governor again in 2026 before dropping out of the race.
- Robert Kelleher unsuccessfully ran for public office 16 times on various party tickets, including a bid for the Presidency in 1976, four runs for Governor of Montana in 1980, 1984, 1992, and 1996, and three runs for Senator from Montana in 1988, 2002, and 2008.
- Stan Lippman, a disbarred attorney and anti-vaccination activist, has unsuccessfully run for office more than eight times in the state of Washington.
- Daniel Mercuri has previously run for governor in 2021 and 2022. He also ran for California's 25th congressional district in both the special election and regular election in 2020. He ran as a Republican until the 2026 gubernatorial election, when he switched to an independent.
- Uncle Mover, known for many years as Mike The Mover, who was born Michael Shanks but legally changed his name twice, has run for public office in Washington state more than 17 times to help promote his furniture moving business.
- Omar Navarro, a conspiracy theorist and convicted criminal, has run against Representative Maxine Waters in California's 43rd congressional district four times. In 2016, 2018, and 2022, he won the Republican nomination but lost to Waters in a landslide every time, while he lost the nomination in 2020.
- Robert C. Newman II, a psychologist and farmer, ran for Governor of California seven consecutive times, running in every election from 2003 to 2022. He ran as a Republican in every election except for 2014, when he ran as an independent.
- Pat Paulsen, a comedian best known for his appearances on the Smothers Brothers Comedy Hour, first ran for president in 1968 as both a joke and a protest. He ran again in 1972 and in succeeding elections until 1996, one year prior to his death.
- Richard Pope, a Bellevue, Washington, attorney, has run for local and state office in Washington state a dozen times, though has yet to be elected.
- Pro-Life, born Marvin Richardson, is an Idaho farmer who is well known for his staunch opposition to abortion which inspired his name change has run as an independent or as a Constitution Party candidate for the state House of Representatives, governor, and both houses of the United States Congress. He has expressed a commitment to continue running for public office until his death.
- Rex Rammell unsuccessfully ran for the Republican nomination for the Idaho House of Representatives in 2002, 2004, and 2012, for Governor of Idaho in 2010 and for Representative from Wyoming in 2016. He also unsuccessfully ran as an independent for Senator from Idaho in 2008 and as the Constitution nominee for Governor of Wyoming in 2018.
- Arturo Pacheco Reyes has run for U.S. Senate in Hawaii in the 2012, 2014, 2016, 2018, and 2024 elections. Reyes has also run for US House in Hawaii's 1st District in 2020 and 2022. Reyes has run as a Democrat, Independent, and most recently as a Republican, but has never qualified for the general election ballot. The closest Reyes came to qualifying was in 2018, when he won the non-partisan primary, but did not receive enough votes under Hawaiian law make it to the general election.
- Gloria La Riva, a socialist activist, has run as either a presidential or vice-presidential candidate in every U.S. presidential election since 1984.
- Art Robinson was the Republican nominee for Oregon's 4th congressional district in five consecutive elections, losing to incumbent Democrat Peter DeFazio in 2010, 2012, 2014, 2016, and 2018. He also served as chair of the Oregon Republican Party from 2013 to 2015. Robinson finally won elected office in 2020, when he was elected to represent Oregon's 2nd Senate district; he chose not to seek re-election.
- Mike Schaefer has run for office 30 times in four states over the course of nearly 60 years. He was first elected to the San Diego City Council in 1965 and re-elected in 1967. He then ran for a variety of offices, including the Senate, House, state legislature, mayor, sheriff, district attorney, city council, and board of supervisors in the states of Arizona, California, Maryland, and Nevada. He ran primarily as a Republican until 2004, when he switched to the Democratic Party. He finally won office again in 2018, winning a seat on the California State Board of Equalization.
- Danny Tarkanian, a Republican businessman from Las Vegas and son of UNLV Basketball coach Jerry Tarkanian and Las Vegas City Councilwoman Lois Tarkanian. He has run for Nevada State Senate, Secretary of State, US Senate in 2010 and 2018, Nevada System of Higher Education and Nevada's 4th and 3rd districts in 2012 and 2016 respectively. He did not reside in either congressional district during his last two campaigns.
- Glen H. Taylor, a Democrat known as "The Singing Cowboy," ran for Congress in Idaho seven times (1938, 1940, 1942, 1944, 1950, 1954 and 1956). His 1944 Senate run was his only successful campaign. Taylor was also the Progressive Party vice presidential nominee in 1948.
- Joel Ventresca has run for office repeatedly in California since 1995, particularly in San Francisco. He ran for Mayor of San Francisco in 1995, 1999, and 2019, as well as the San Francisco Board of Supervisors in 2002. He also ran for governor in 2021 and 2022.
- Laura Wells, a Green Party activist, has repeatedly run for office in California since 2002. She has run for California State Controller four times, in 2002, 2006, 2014, and 2022. She also ran for governor in 2010. In 2018, Wells ran a write-in campaign for California's 13th congressional district; she received more votes than Republican candidate Jeanne Solnordal and thus advanced to the general election, where she lost to incumbent Representative Barbara Lee.
- Don Wright, as president of the Alaska Federation of Natives during the early 1970s, played a major role in the passage of the Alaska Native Claims Settlement Act. Wright is also known as a perennial candidate, having run for statewide office in Alaska 15 times since 1968. Wright has run for governor of Alaska 11 consecutive times since 1974. Wright ran 7 of those campaigns under a major party but lost in the primary election each time. The remaining four times (1978, 2002, 2006 and 2010), he was the nominee of the Alaskan Independence Party.
