= MY Complex Fire =

2021 wildfire in Montana

- Date: July 9, 2021 – present
- Location: Hysham, Montana
- Coordinates: 46.254°N 107.638°W

Statistics
- Burned area: 89,748 acres (36,320 ha)

Impacts
- Structures lost: 0

Ignition
- Cause: Lightning

Map
- Location in Northern Montana

The MY Complex Fire is a large complex of wildfires burning in Montana. The fire started near Hysham, Montana on July 9, 2021. It has so far burned 89,748 acres (36,320 ha) and is 0% contained.

== Events ==
=== July ===
The MY Complex Fire was first reported on July 9, 2021 at around 10:45 a.m. MDT near Hysham, Montana. It burned out an area of 4,400 acres (1,800 ha) by July 12.

=== Cause ===
The cause of the fire is believed to be due to lightning.

=== Containment ===
As of July 12, 2021, the fire is 0% percent contained.
