= Annesdale =

Historic house in Tennessee, United States

- U.S. National Register of Historic Places
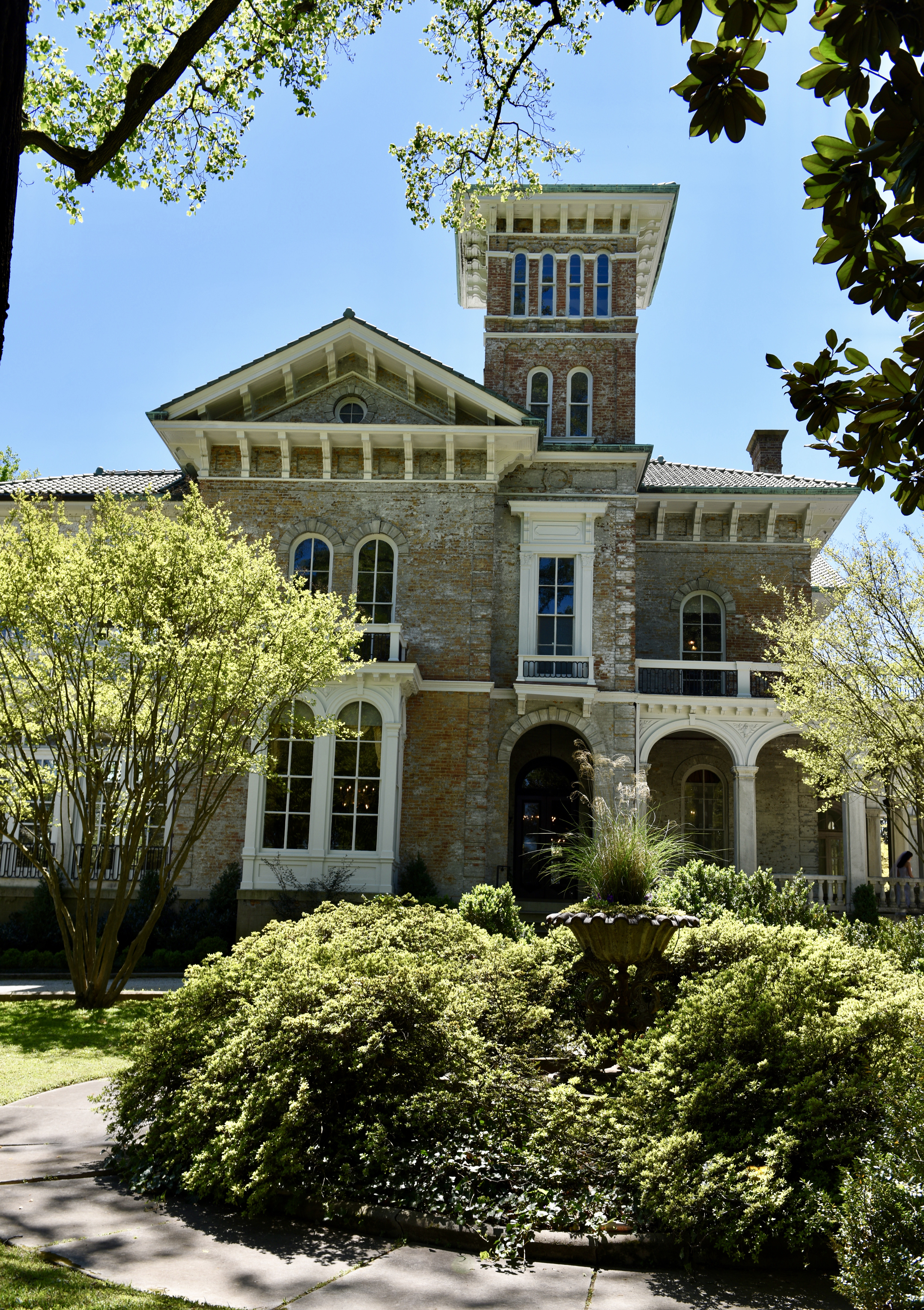

- Location within Tennessee Location within the United States
- Location: 1325 Lamar Ave., Memphis, Tennessee
- Coordinates: 35°7′30″N 90°1′3″W
- Area: 7.5 acres (3.0 ha)
- Built: 1855
- Architectural style: Italian Villa
- NRHP reference No.: 80003856
- Added to NRHP: November 25, 1980

Annesdale is a historic mansion in Memphis, Tennessee, United States.

== History ==
The two-story mansion was completed in 1855. It was built for Dr Samuel Mansfield.

The mansion was later purchased by Colonel Bogardus Snowden and his wife, Annie Overton, who was the granddaughter of Judge John Overton. Their son, Robert Brinkley Snowden, became a real estate developer who lived at Ashlar Hall.

In June 2016, a bone fragment, possibly human, was discovered in the grate of a boarded-up fireplace. The fragment was sent to a morgue for further investigation. The bone is very old and may date back to the Civil War when Annesdale served as a hospital.

== Architectural significance ==
It has been listed on the National Register of Historic Places since November 25, 1980.
