= Ashlar Hall =

Historic house in Tennessee, United States

- U.S. National Register of Historic Places
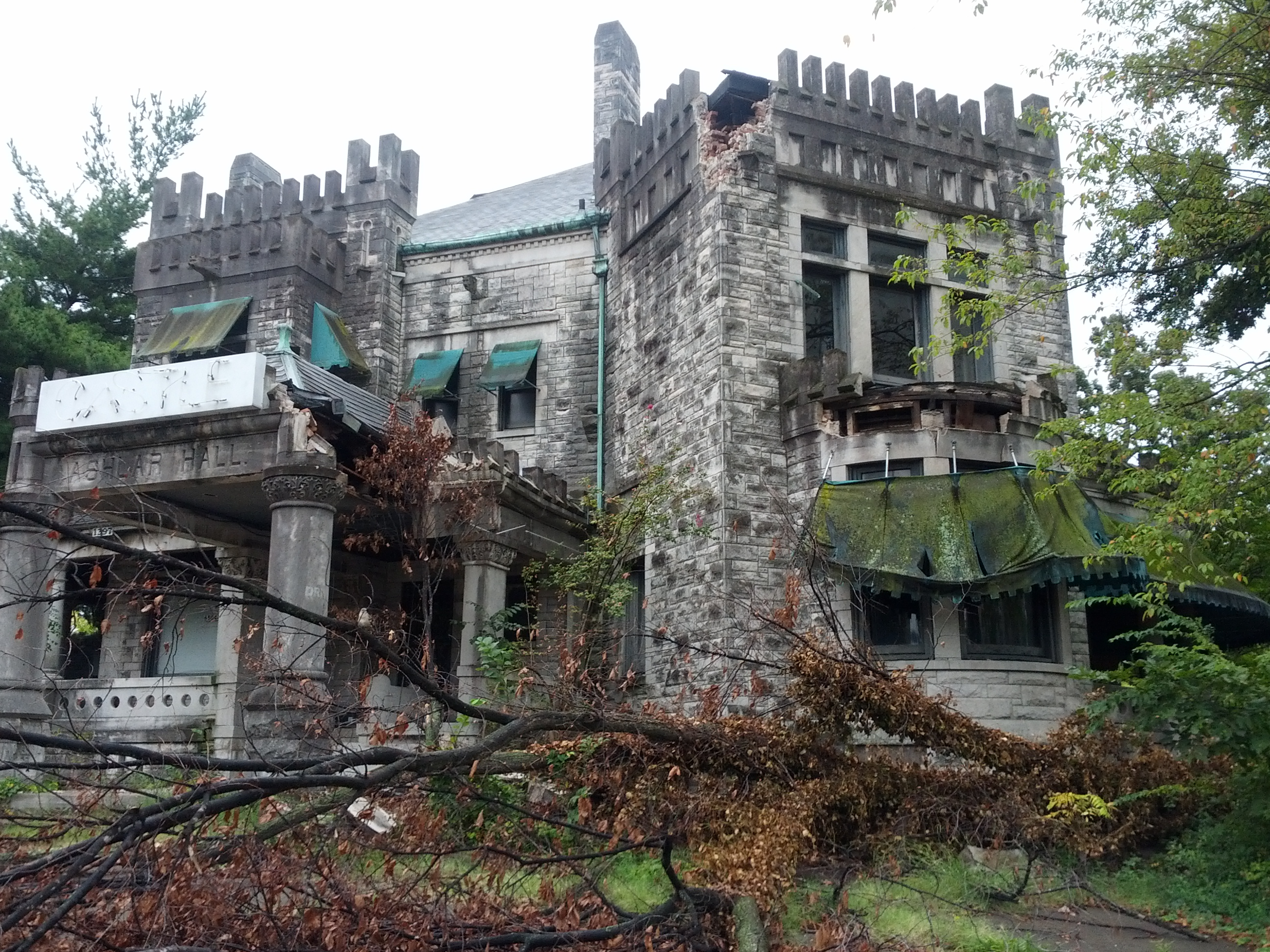
- Ashlar Hall in 2012

- Location within Tennessee Location within the United States
- Location: 1397 Central Ave., Memphis, Tennessee
- Coordinates: 35°7′34″N 90°0′57″W
- Area: 0.8 acres (0.32 ha)
- Built: 1896
- NRHP reference No.: 83003061
- Added to NRHP: January 13, 1983

Ashlar Hall is a historic mock castle in Memphis, Tennessee.

== History ==
The two-story mansion was completed in 1896. It was designed as a mock castle. The mansion was built for Robert Brinkley Snowden, a real estate developer who grew up at Annesdale.

The mansion was used as a restaurant by the 1950s.

It was listed on the National Register of Historic Places on January 13, 1983.

In the 1990s it was purchased by entrepreneur Steven Dunlap who renovated it and opened it as a nightclub called The Castle. Prince Mongo later purchased it and reopened it as a nightclub often referred to as 'Prince Mongo's Castle', before finally being closed as a nuisance in 2000.

In 2013 the building was taken over by Jerome Hardaway in an attempt to convert it into a veterans tech job training center operated by his non-profit organization FRAGO. This venture failed to gain traction and the Tennessee nonprofit eventually closed in 2021. Hardaway established another non-profit veterans organization—Vets Who Code—that same year, in Georgia. According to the Georgia Corporations Division of the Georgia Secretary of State, Vets Who Code was dissolved in 2023. Ashlar Hall never functioned as a veterans training center.

In 2017 it was sold to a new owner, Juan Montoya, who worked in construction, who had plans to renovate the building. It was then used in 2019 for an immersive theatre production “Rights of Spring”, by the Julia Hinson's theater group Lost In Found.

By 2023 it had been fully restored and was due to open as an events venue.

== See also ==
- National Register of Historic Places listings in Shelby County, Tennessee
