= Lee Nye =

American photographer (1926–1999)

- Born: 1926; Hysham, Montana, U.S.
- Died: November 11, 1999 (aged 72–73)
- Education: Brooks Institute of Photography
- Occupation: Photographer

Lee Nye (1926 – November 11, 1999) was an American photographer best known for his series of photographs entitled Eddie's Club Collection that documents Missoula, Montana's working class inhabitants.

== Life and career ==
Nye was born in Hysham, Montana, in 1926. He attended high school in Butte where his father worked for the Northern Pacific Railway. Nye quit high school at 17 and worked as a cowboy until he later joined the United States Navy. In 1950 he moved to California and studied photography at the Brooks Institute of Photography. In the following years, Nye worked as a photographer in Los Angeles and New Orleans, covering theater, movie still photography, news, fashion, and portraiture. He was awarded two prizes in 1953 by Photography Magazine for his photographs "Sunday Morning" and "The Bath."

His work has been exhibited throughout the United States and Europe. His photographs have appeared in Photography, Dance Magazine, Playboy, Art News, American Craft, and Montana Magazine.

== Exhibitions ==
Transitions in the Nude: 1950–1999; The Montana Museum of Art and Culture, November 9, 2004 – January 31, 2005
