= Mike Taylor (Montana politician) =

American politician

Mike Taylor (born June 12, 1941) is an American hairdresser, rancher, and politician.

Born in Lewistown, Fergus County, Montana, Taylor grew up in Judith Basin County, Montana. He owned a hair cutting shop and was a rancher, living in Proctor, Montana. From 1997 to 2005, Taylor served in the Montana State Senate as a Republican. In 2002, Taylor ran for the United States Senate in Montana, opposing the incumbent Max Baucus. He then re-entered the campaign and lost the election to Baucus. Taylor ran for the Montana Public Service Commission in the 5th district in 2006, but he lost the general election to Ken Toole by 0.13%.

Montana Senate
Preceded by Ethel M. Harding	Member of the Montana Senate from the 37th district 1997–2005	Succeeded by Steve Gallus
Party political offices
Preceded by Denny Rehberg	Republican nominee for U.S. Senator from Montana (Class 2); 2002	Succeeded by Bob Kelleher
