= Yucca Theatre =

- U.S. National Register of Historic Places
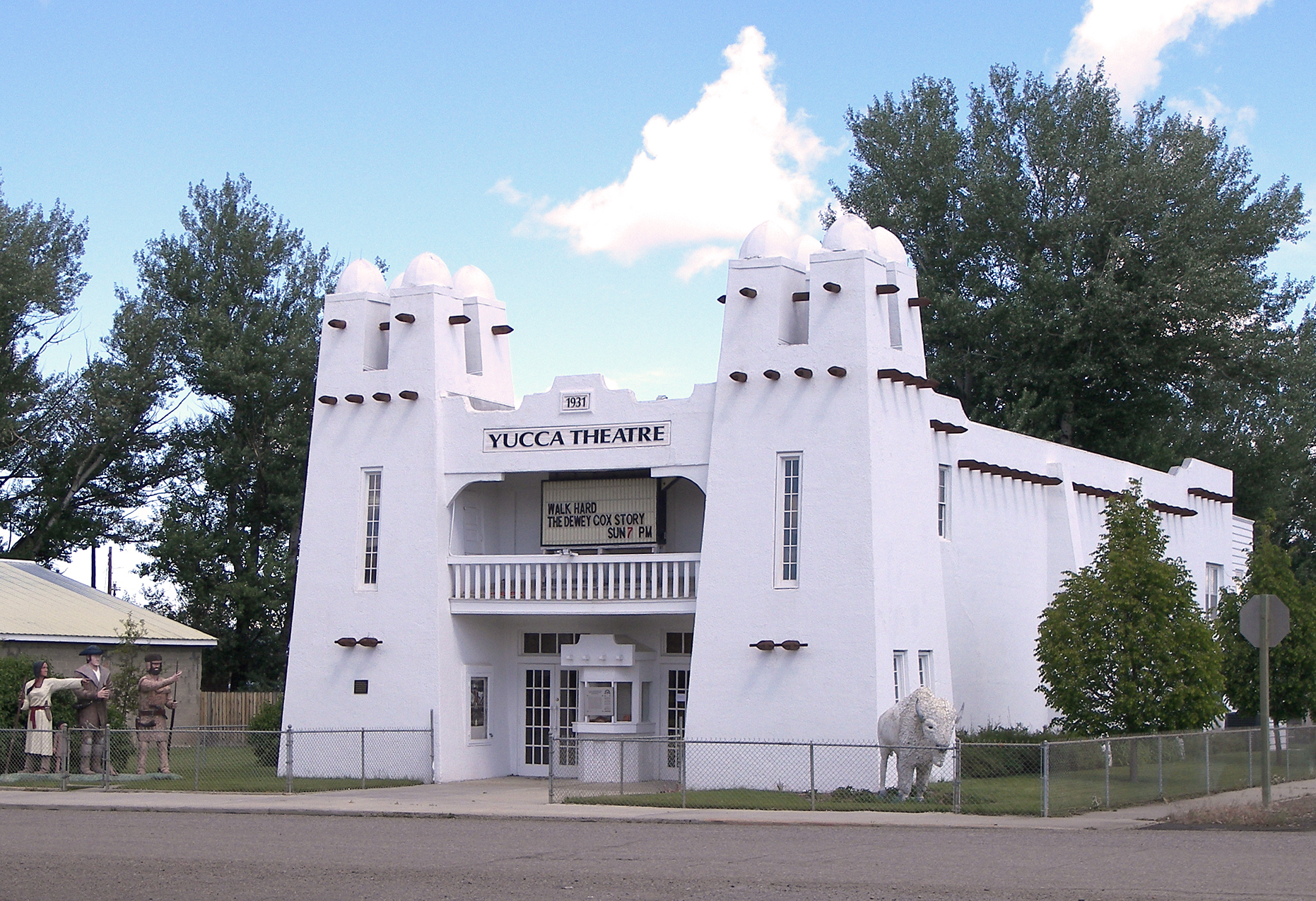

- Location within Montana Location within the United States
- Location: 520 Division St., Hysham, Montana
- Coordinates: 46°17′34″N 107°14′0″W
- Built: 1931
- Architect: David Manning, James Manning
- Architectural style: Mission/Spanish Revival
- NRHP reference No.: 93001447
- Added to NRHP: January 7, 1994

The Yucca Theatre in Hysham, Montana, was built in 1931 by David Manning. The Mission style movie theater initially had a stage for theatrical productions which was removed in 1936. The theater closed in 1957 and became a part of the adjoining Manning home. The theater has since been restored and is used as a community theater. The theatre is significant for its architecture and its association with Manning, a prominent Montana legislator.

== Description ==
The theatre is a two-story Mission style building, built of stucco-clad brick. The front facade faces south and features two buttressed towers at the corners flanking the main entrance. The entry and octagonal ticket booth are inset between the towers under a railed balcony. The front and sides are detailed with projecting vigas. The towers are subdivided into four piers each, with a domed cap. The theater's interior was originally entirely used by the auditorium space, but in 1936–37 the stage was altered to become living space for the owner's family. In 1950 these spaces were expanded with one-story additions. The living quarters were expanded again in 1974, shortening the main house. The auditorium has a small balcony under the projection booth.

== History ==
The theatre was built by David M. Manning in 1931 during a period of economic expansion in Hysham. Manning was born in Chippewa Falls, Wisconsin on February 28, 1897, and arrived with his family in Hysham in 1910. Manning was a contractor and served as a state legislator until 1985, holding most of the senior positions in the Montana House of Representatives and Senate. The Mannings operated the theatrer as a cinema until the 1960s. In 1992 the building became part of the Treasure County Museum, whose main facility is located across the street. The theater is used for community movie shows and plays.

The Yucca Theatre was placed on the National Register of Historic Places on January 7, 1994.
