= 2020 Missouri Democratic presidential primary =

- March 10, 2020

79 delegates (68 pledged, 11 unpledged) to the Democratic National Convention The number of pledged delegates won is determined by the popular vote

| Candidate | Joe Biden | Bernie Sanders |
| Home state | Delaware | Vermont |
| Delegate count | 44 | 24 |
| Popular vote | 400,347 | 230,374 |
| Percentage | 60.10% | 34.59% |
- County results Joe Biden

The 2020 Missouri Democratic presidential primary took place on March 10, 2020, as one of several states voting the week after Super Tuesday in the Democratic Party primaries for the 2020 presidential election. The Missouri primary was an open primary, with the state awarding 79 delegates towards the 2020 Democratic National Convention, of which 68 were pledged delegates allocated on the basis of the results of the primary.

Former vice president Joe Biden had won the primary by a landslide, taking around 60% of the vote, winning every county in the state and gaining 44 delegates, while senator Bernie Sanders received almost 35% of the vote and 24 delegates.

== Procedure ==
Missouri was one of six states (along with Democrats Abroad) which held primaries on March 10, 2020, one week after Super Tuesday. Voting took place throughout the state from 6:00 a.m. until 7:00 p.m. In the open primary, candidates had to meet a threshold of 15 percent at the congressional district or statewide level in order to be considered viable. The 68 pledged delegates to the 2020 Democratic National Convention were allocated proportionally on the basis of the results of the primary. Of these, between 4 and 8 were allocated to each of the state's 8 congressional districts and another 9 were allocated to party leaders and elected officials (PLEO delegates), in addition to 15 at-large delegates. The March primary as part of Stage I on the primary timetable received no bonus delegates, in order to disperse the primaries between more different date clusters and keep too many states from hoarding on a March date.

Following ward, township, legislative district, and county mass meetings on April 9, 2020, during which district and state convention delegates were designated, district conventions on April 30, 2020, chose national convention district delegates. At the meeting of the Democratic state committee in Jefferson City on May 9, 2020, the 9 pledged PLEO delegates were voted on, while the 15 pledged at-large delegates should have been selected at the subsequent state convention in Columbia on June 20, 2020. However, due to the COVID-19 pandemic the state convention was held virtually between June 13 and June 19. The delegation also included 11 unpledged PLEO delegates: 8 members of the Democratic National Committee, 2 representatives from Congress, and former House Majority Leader Dick Gephardt.

Pledged national convention delegates
| Type | Del. |
|---|---|
| CD1 | 8 |
| CD2 | 6 |
| CD3 | 5 |
| CD4 | 5 |
| CD5 | 6 |
| CD6 | 5 |
| CD7 | 5 |
| CD8 | 4 |
| PLEO | 9 |
| At-large | 15 |
| Total pledged delegates | 68 |

== Candidates ==
The following individuals qualified for the ballot in Missouri:

Running

- Joe Biden
- Steve Burke
- Roque "Rocky" De La Fuente III
- Tulsi Gabbard
- William C. Haas
- Henry Hewes
- Bernie Sanders
- Leonard J. Steinman II
- Velma Steinman
- Robby Wells

Withdrawn

- Michael Bennet
- Michael Bloomberg
- Cory Booker
- Pete Buttigieg
- Julian Castro
- John Delaney
- Amy Klobuchar
- Deval Patrick
- Tom Steyer
- Elizabeth Warren
- Marianne Williamson
- Andrew Yang

There was also an uncommitted option on the ballot.

== Polling ==
Polling aggregation
| Source of poll aggregation | Date updated | Dates polled | Joe Biden | Bernie Sanders | Tulsi Gabbard | Other/ Undecided (Note: Calculated by taking the difference of 100% and all other candidates combined) |
|---|---|---|---|---|---|---|
| 270 to Win | March 10, 2020 | March 4–9, 2020 | 57.6% | 34.4% | 2.7% | 5.3% |
| RealClear Politics | March 10, 2020 | March 4–9, 2020 | 61.0% | 30.7% | 2.5% | 5.8% |
| FiveThirtyEight | March 10, 2020 | until March 9, 2020 (Note: FiveThirtyEight aggregates polls with a trendline regression of polls rather than a strict average of recent polls.) | 60.3% | 32.6% | 2.5% | 4.6% |
| Average | | | 59.6% | 32.6% | 2.6% | 5.2% |
| Missouri primary results (March 10, 2020) | | | 60.1% | 34.6% | 0.7% | 4.6% |

Tabulation of individual polls of the 2020 Missouri Democratic primary
| Poll source | Date(s) administered | Sample size (Note: Key: A – all adults RV – registered voters LV – likely voters V – unclear) | Margin of error | Joe Biden | Michael Bloomberg | Pete Buttigieg | Kamala Harris | Amy Klobuchar | Beto O'Rourke | Bernie Sanders | Elizabeth Warren | Other | Undecided |
|---|---|---|---|---|---|---|---|---|---|---|---|---|---|
| Swayable | Mar 9, 2020 | 2,037 (LV) | ± 3.0% | 57% | – | – | – | – | – | 36% | – | 8% (Note: Gabbard with 3%; "Other" with 5%) | – |
| Øptimus | Mar 7–9, 2020 | 402 (LV) | ± 5.4% | 68% | – | – | – | – | – | 29% | – | 3% (Note: Gabbard with 3%) | – |
| Data for Progress | Mar 4–7, 2020 | 348 (LV) | ± 5.3% | 62% | – | – | – | – | – | 32% | 4% | 2% (Note: Gabbard with 2%) | – |
| | Mar 5, 2020 | Warren withdraws from the race | | | | | | | | | | | |
| Remington Research Group/Missouri Scout | Mar 4–5, 2020 | 1,040 (LV) | ± 3.0% | 53% | – | – | – | – | – | 31% | – | 10% (Note: "Other" with 10%) | 6% |
| Emerson Polling/Nexstar | Mar 4–5, 2020 | 425 (LV) | ± 4.7% | 48% | – | – | – | – | – | 44% | – | 8% (Note: Gabbard with 2%; "Someone else/undecided" with 6%) | <6% |
| | Mar 4, 2020 | Bloomberg withdraws from the race | | | | | | | | | | | |
| | Mar 2, 2020 | Klobuchar withdraws from the race | | | | | | | | | | | |
| | Mar 1, 2020 | Buttigieg withdraws from the race | | | | | | | | | | | |
| The Progress Campaign (D) | Feb 16–23, 2020 | 294 (RV) | ± 5.1% | 29% | 14% | 13% | – | 4% | – | 23% | 12% | 4% (Note: Gabbard and Steyer with 2%) | – |
| Americana Analytics | Feb 20–21, 2020 | 1,198 (LV) | ± 2.83% | 22% | 17% | 11% | – | 9% | – | 11% | 10% | 1% (Note: Steyer with 1%; Gabbard with 0%) | 17% |
| Remington Research Group | Jan 22–23, 2020 | 1,460 (LV) | – | 39% | 14% | 6% | – | 8% | – | 7% | 9% | 3% (Note: Yang with 2%; Steyer with 1%) | 14% |
| | Dec 3, 2019 | Harris withdraws from the race | | | | | | | | | | | |
| | Nov 1, 2019 | O'Rourke withdraws from the race | | | | | | | | | | | |
| Show Me Victories | Sept 13–16, 2019 | 400 | ± 5% | 34% | – | 10% | 9% | 1% | 4% | 14% | 22% | 8% (Note: Booker and Yang with 1%; Castro with <1%; rest with 0%; Someone else with 6%) | – |
| Remington Research Group | Jul 10–11, 2019 | 1,122 | – | 43% | – | 5% | 13% | – | 1% | 4% | 15% | – | 19% |

== Results ==
Results by county Biden—40–50% Biden—50–60% Biden—60–70% Biden—70–80%

2020 Missouri Democratic presidential primary
| Candidate | Votes | % | Delegates |
|---|---|---|---|
| Joe Biden | 400,347 | 60.10 | 44 |
| Bernie Sanders | 230,374 | 34.59 | 24 |
| Michael Bloomberg (withdrawn) | 9,866 | 1.48 | |
| Elizabeth Warren (withdrawn) | 8,156 | 1.22 | |
| Tulsi Gabbard | 4,887 | 0.73 | |
| Pete Buttigieg (withdrawn) | 3,309 | 0.50 | |
| Amy Klobuchar (withdrawn) | 2,682 | 0.40 | |
| Andrew Yang (withdrawn) | 953 | 0.14 | |
| Cory Booker (withdrawn) | 651 | 0.10 | |
| Tom Steyer (withdrawn) | 584 | 0.09 | |
| Michael Bennet (withdrawn) | 206 | 0.03 | |
| Marianne Williamson (withdrawn) | 170 | 0.03 | |
| John Delaney (withdrawn) | 159 | 0.02 | |
| Julian Castro (withdrawn) | 103 | 0.02 | |
| Henry Hewes | 94 | 0.01 | |
| Deval Patrick (withdrawn) | 52 | 0.01 | |
| Other candidates | 1,025 | 0.15 | |
| Uncommitted | 2,494 | 0.37 | |
| Total | 666,112 | 100% | 68 |

== See also ==
- 2020 Missouri Republican presidential primary
