= 2002 United States Senate election in Montana =

- November 5, 2002
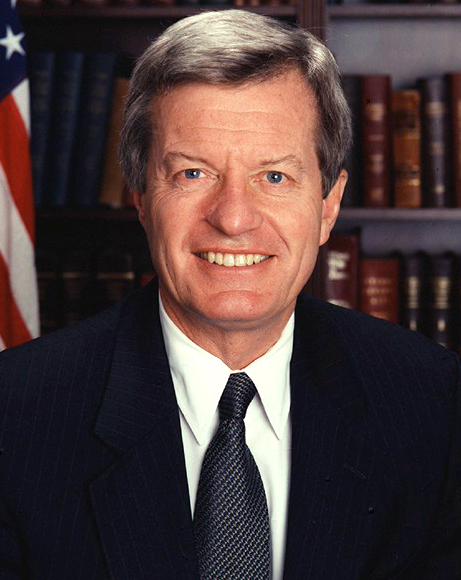

Nominee	Max Baucus	Mike Taylor
Party	Democratic	Republican
Popular vote	204,853	103,611
Percentage	62.74%	31.73%
- County results Baucus: 40–50% 50–60% 60–70% 70–80% 80–90% Taylor: 40–50% 50–60%
U.S. senator before election
Max Baucus
Democratic
Elected U.S. Senator
Max Baucus
Democratic

The 2002 United States Senate election in Montana was held on November 5, 2002. Incumbent Democratic U.S. Senator Max Baucus won re-election to a fifth term.

This was one of the six Democratic-held Senate seats up for election in a state that George W. Bush won in the 2000 presidential election.

== Democratic primary ==
=== Candidates ===
- Max Baucus, incumbent U.S. Senator

=== Results ===
Democratic primary results
Party	Candidate	Votes	%
Democratic	Max Baucus (incumbent)	66,713	100.00%
Total votes		66,713	100.00%

== Republican primary ==
=== Candidates ===
- Melvin Hanson
- Brad Johnson, businessman
- John McDonald
- Mike Taylor, Montana State Senator

=== Results ===
Republican primary results
Party	Candidate	Votes	%
Republican	Mike Taylor	48,169	60.16%
Republican	Brad Johnson	14,252	17.80%
Republican	John McDonald	10,116	12.63%
Republican	Melvin Hanson	7,536	9.41%
Total votes		80,073	100.00%

== General election ==
=== Candidates ===
- Max Baucus, incumbent U.S. Senator (Democratic)
- Stan Jones (Libertarian)
- Bob Kelleher, attorney (Green)

==== Withdrew ====
- Mike Taylor, State Senator (Republican) (withdrew October 10)

=== Campaign ===
The 2002 Montana elections drew national attention when Baucus's opponent, state senator Mike Taylor, accused Baucus of having implied that Taylor was gay in a campaign ad. The ad was paid for by the Democratic Senatorial Campaign Committee, though designed by the Baucus campaign. The ad, which alleged that Taylor had embezzled funds from the cosmetology school he once owned, showed footage from the early 1980s of Taylor massaging another man's face while wearing a tight suit with an open shirt. Taylor dropped out of the race and Baucus won with 63 percent of the vote.

=== Debates ===
- Complete video of debate, September 16, 2002

=== Predictions ===
Source	Ranking	As of
Sabato's Crystal Ball	Safe D	November 4, 2002

=== Results ===
General election results
Party	Candidate	Votes	%	±%
Democratic	Max Baucus (incumbent)	204,853	62.74%	+13.18%
Republican	Mike Taylor	103,611	31.73%	−12.96%
Libertarian	Stan Jones	10,420	3.19%	N/A
Green	Bob Kelleher	7,653	2.34%	N/A
Total votes		326,537	100.00%	N/A
Democratic hold				

==== Counties that flipped from Republican to Democratic ====
- Beaverhead (largest city: Dillon)
- Broadwater (largest city: Townsend)
- Carter (largest city: Ekalaka)
- Daniels (largest city: Scobey)
- Fallon (largest city: Baker)
- Fergus (largest city: Lewistown)
- Flathead (largest city: Kalispell)
- Garfield (largest city: Jordan)
- Golden Valley (largest city: Ryegate)
- Granite (largest city: Philipsburg)
- Jefferson (largest city: Clancy)
- Judith Basin (largest city: Stanford)
- Liberty (largest city: Chester)
- Lincoln (largest city: Libby)
- Madison (largest city: Ennis)
- McCone (largest city: Circle)
- Meagher (largest city: White Sulphur Springs)
- Musselshell (largest city: Roundup)
- Park (largest city: Livingston)
- Petroleum (largest city: Winnett)
- Phillips (largest city: Malta)
- Pondera (largest city: Conrad)
- Powder River (largest city: Broadus)
- Powell (largest city: Deer Lodge)
- Prairie (largest city: Terry)
- Ravalli (largest city: Hamilton)
- Richland (largest city: Sidney)
- Gallatin (largest city: Bozeman)
- Lake (largest city: Polson)
- Roosevelt (largest city: Wolf Point)
- Chouteau (largest municipality: Fort Benton)
- Sanders (largest city: Thompson Falls)
- Stillwater (largest city: Columbus)
- Sweet Grass (largest city: Big Timber)
- Teton (largest city: Choteau)
- Toole (largest city: Shelby)
- Treasure (largest city: Hysham)
- Valley (largest city: Glasgow)
- Wheatland (largest city: Harlowton)
- Wibaux (largest city: Wibaux)

== See also ==
- 2002 United States Senate elections
