= 2008 United States Senate election in Montana =

- November 4, 2008
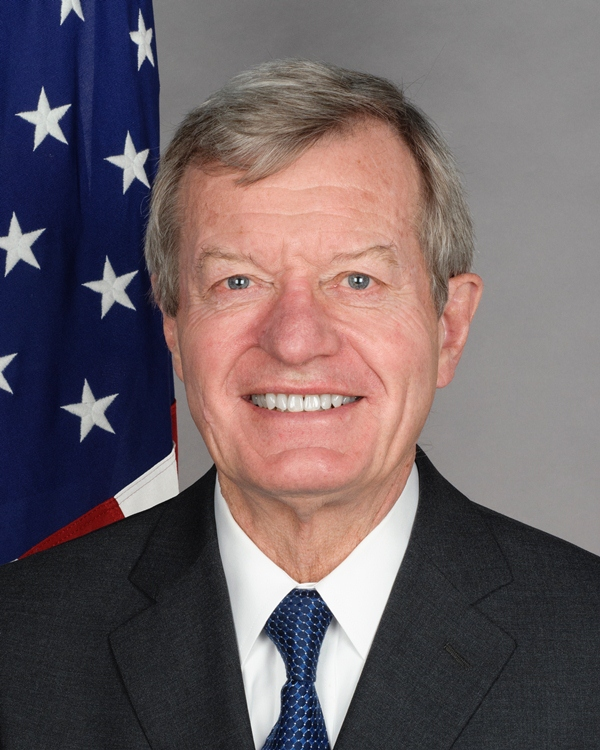

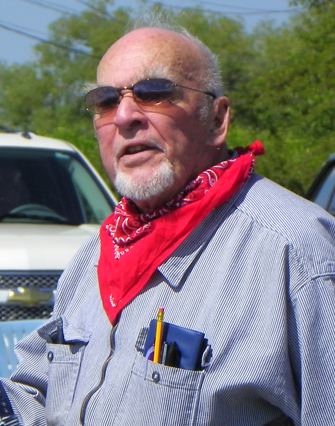
Nominee	Max Baucus	Bob Kelleher
Party	Democratic	Republican
Popular vote	348,289	129,369
Percentage	72.92%	27.08%
- County results Baucus: 50–60% 60–70% 70–80% 80–90%
U.S. senator before election
Max Baucus
Democratic
Elected U.S. Senator
Max Baucus
Democratic

The 2008 United States Senate election in Montana was held on November 4, 2008. Incumbent Senator Max Baucus won re-election to a sixth term in a landslide, winning more than 72% of the vote and carrying every county in the state, despite Republican John McCain's narrow victory in the state in the concurrent presidential election. Baucus later resigned his seat on February 6, 2014, after the Senate confirmed him to as U.S. ambassador to China, having already announced his intention to retire at the end of his term on April 23, 2013. As of 2024, this is the last time Democrats won the Class 2 Senate seat in Montana, and the last Montana U.S. Senate race where any candidate won every county.

== Background ==
Montana generally gives its presidential electors to Republican candidates, but historically has elected several prominent Democrats to the United States Senate, including Thomas Walsh, Burton K. Wheeler, Mike Mansfield, and Lee Metcalf. Between 1913 and 2015, only two Republicans served as U.S. Senator from Montana, Zales Ecton and Conrad Burns. In 2004, the state elected Democratic Governor Brian Schweitzer, reversing a 16-year trend of electing Republicans to the Governorship. In the 2006 elections, the Republican Party took over the state House of Representatives in Montana, the only pick-up of a state legislature for the Republicans. In 2006 the Democratic candidate for the United States Senate Jon Tester managed to defeat incumbent Republican Senator Conrad Burns and flip the seat into the Democratic column.

== Democratic primary ==
=== Candidates ===
- Max Baucus, incumbent U.S. Senator

=== Results ===
Democratic primary results
Party	Candidate	Votes	%
Democratic	Max Baucus (incumbent)	165,050	100.00%
Total votes		165,050	100.00%

== Republican primary ==
=== Candidates ===
- Kirk Bushman, businessman
- Bob Kelleher, attorney and perennial candidate
- Michael Lange, State Representative
- Patty Lovaas, accountant
- Anton Pearson, rancher
- Garnett Shay, engineer

=== Campaign ===
All Republican candidates trailed Baucus badly in polls. It was revealed that Garnett Shay had an outstanding warrant for his arrest, preventing him from running an effective campaign.

=== Results ===
Republican primary results
Party	Candidate	Votes	%
Republican	Bob Kelleher	26,936	36.32%
Republican	Michael Lange	17,044	22.98%
Republican	Kirk Bushman	15,507	20.91%
Republican	Patty Lovaas	7,632	10.29%
Republican	Anton Pearson	4,257	5.74%
Republican	Garnett Shay	2,788	3.76%
Total votes		74,164	100.00%

== General election ==
=== Candidates ===
- Max Baucus (D), incumbent U.S. Senator.
- Bob Kelleher (R), attorney and perennial candidate

=== Campaign ===
Senator Baucus defeated Kelleher as a Democratic incumbent running in a year that was very successful for his party in general. The U.S. Senate race in Montana was somewhat unusual, in that it was perhaps the only race that year in which the Republican candidate was more liberal than the Democratic one. Kelleher, a perennial candidate and eccentric figure in Montana politics, took many positions that were highly unorthodox by GOP standards, such as favoring more liberal drug control policies, supporting universal healthcare and affirmative action, and favoring fair trade restrictions. He was, at the time, an 85-year-old attorney and perennial candidate who has run for office on several different party tickets. Kelleher was pro-life, advocated a parliamentary system of government for the United States, and supported nationalization of the American oil and gas industry and a single-payer health care system. He received no support from the Montana Republican Party.

=== Predictions ===
Source	Ranking	As of
The Cook Political Report	Safe D	October 23, 2008
CQ Politics	Safe D	October 31, 2008
Rothenberg Political Report	Safe D	November 2, 2008
Real Clear Politics	Safe D	November 4, 2008

=== Polling ===
Poll Source	Dates administered	Max Baucus (D)	Bob Kelleher (R)
Rasmussen Reports	September 7, 2008	64%	31%
Public Policy Polling	November 2, 2008	71%	26%

=== Results ===
General election results
Party	Candidate	Votes	%	±%
Democratic	Max Baucus (incumbent)	348,289	72.92%	+10.18%
Republican	Bob Kelleher	129,369	27.08%	−4.65%
Total votes		477,658	100.00%	N/A
Democratic hold				

==== Counties that flipped from Republican to Democratic ====
- Carter (largest city: Ekalaka)
- Sweet Grass (largest city: Big Timber)

== See also ==
- 2008 United States Senate elections
- 2008 Montana gubernatorial election
