= Leonard Steinman =

American perennial candidate

Leonard J. Steinman II (1952 - August 5, 2023) was an American perennial candidate from Jefferson City, Missouri.

== Personal life ==
Steinman was born in Jefferson City, and graduated from Jefferson City High School. Steinman attended classes at Columbia College. He served for four years in the U.S. Navy from 1971 to 1975. He worked as a long-haul truck driver. Steinman's wife Velma also ran for office several times.

Steinman died on August 5, 2023 at age 71.

== Political campaigns ==
Steinman frequently ran for office in Missouri, campaigning in hand-painted vans.

=== 2008, Missouri House of Representatives ===
2008 Missouri House of Representatives District 114 primary
Party	Candidate	Votes	%
Democratic	Leonard Steinman	1,555	100.0%
Total votes		1,555	100.0

2008 Missouri House of Representatives District 114 general election
Party	Candidate	Votes	%
Republican	Bill Deeken	14,016	73.6%
Democratic	Leonard Steinman	5,028	26.4%
Total votes		19,048	100.0

=== 2010, U.S. House ===
2010 U.S. House, Missouri District 4, Democratic primary
Party	Candidate	Votes	%
Democratic	Ike Skelton (incumbent)	25,919	80.53
Democratic	Leonard Steinman	6,268	19.47
Total votes		32,187	100.00

=== 2011, Mayor ===
In 2011, Steinman was a candidate for mayor of Jefferson City.

=== 2012, Governor ===
Steinman filed to run in the 2012 Libertarian Party primary for Missouri governor, but his name did not appear on the final ballot.

=== 2014, U.S. House ===
2014 U.S. House of Representatives, Missouri District 3, Republican primary
Party	Candidate	Votes	%
Republican	Blaine Luetkemeyer (incumbent)	71,030	79.5
Republican	John Morris	9,786	10.9
Republican	Leonard Steinman	8,580	9.6
Total votes		89,396	100.0

=== 2015, Mayor ===
In 2015, Steinman ran again for mayor of Jefferson City.

=== 2016, City Council ===
In 2016, Steinman ran for the Jefferson City city council.

=== 2016, Governor ===
2016 Missouri Democratic gubernatorial primary
Party	Candidate	Votes	%
Democratic	Chris Koster	256,272	78.75%
Democratic	Eric Morrison	31,474	9.67%
Democratic	Charles Wheeler	25,756	7.92%
Democratic	Leonard Steinman	11,911	3.66%
Total votes		325,413	100.00%

=== 2018, U.S. Senate ===
2018 U.S. Senate Missouri Democratic primary
Party	Candidate	Votes	%
Democratic	Claire McCaskill (incumbent)	501,872	82.60%
Democratic	Carla Wright	41,126	6.77%
Democratic	John Hogan	15,984	2.63%
Democratic	David Faust	15,958	2.63%
Democratic	Angelica Earl	15,500	2.55%
Democratic	Travis Gonzalez	9,480	1.56%
Democratic	Leonard Steinman	7,657	1.26%
Total votes		607,577	100.00%

=== 2020, President ===
In 2020, Steinman registered for and appeared on the ballot in the 2020 Missouri Democratic presidential primary.

=== 2020, U.S. House ===
Missouri's 3rd congressional district, 2020 Libertarian primary
Party	Candidate	Votes	%
Libertarian	Leonard J. Steinman II	627	100.0
Total votes		627	100.0

Missouri's 3rd congressional district, 2020
Party	Candidate	Votes	%
Republican	Blaine Luetkemeyer (incumbent)	282,866	69.4
Democratic	Megan Rezabek	116,095	28.5
Libertarian	Leonard J. Steinman II	8,344	2.1
Write-in		43	0.0
Total votes		407,348	100.0
Republican hold			

=== 2021, City Council ===
In 2021, Steinman ran again for city council in Jefferson City.
