= 2014 United States House of Representatives election in Wyoming =

2014 United States House of Representatives election in Wyoming's at-large district
- November 4, 2014
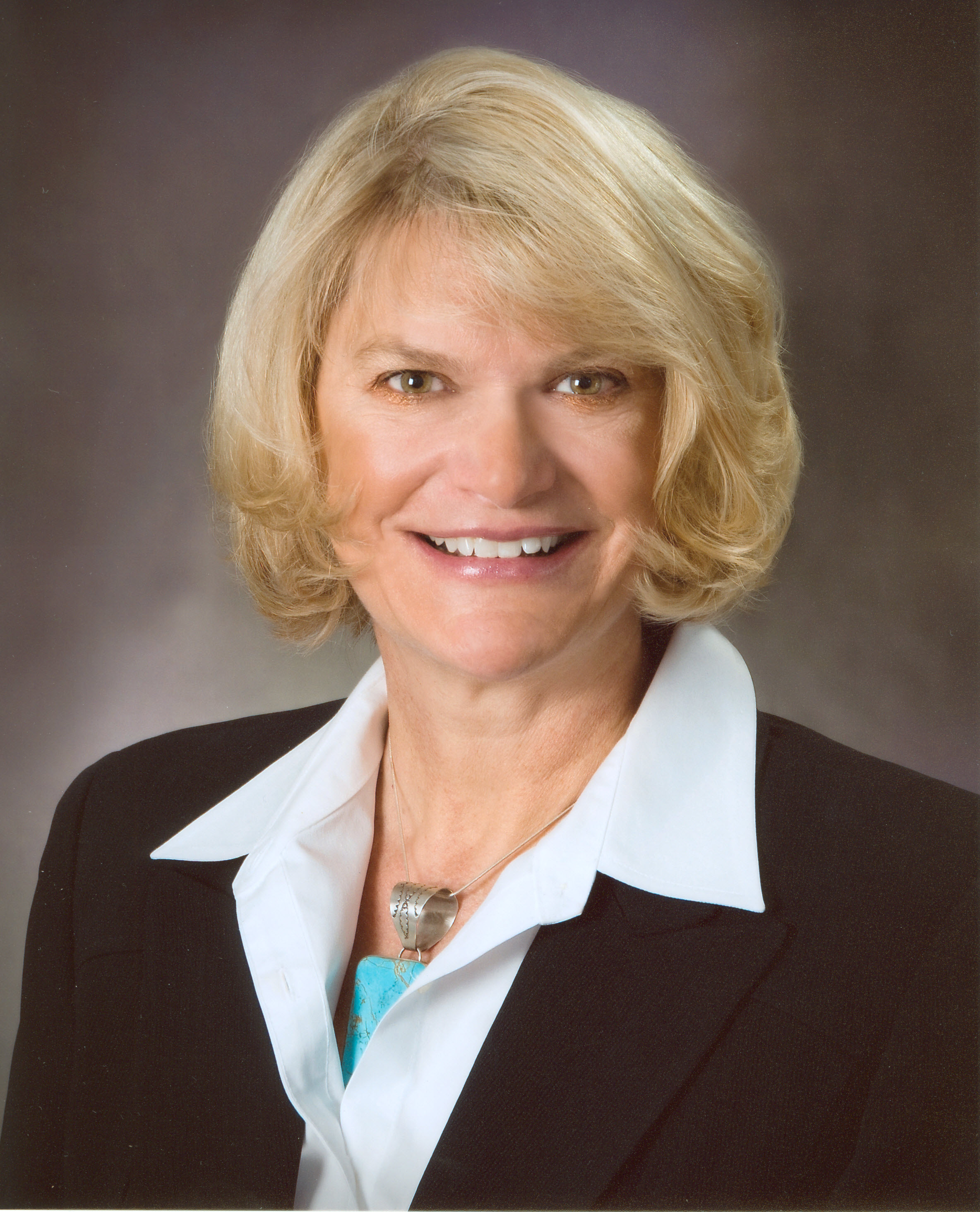

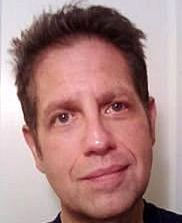
Nominee	Cynthia Lummis	Richard Grayson
Party	Republican	Democratic
Popular vote	113,038	37,803
Percentage	68.47%	22.90%
- County results Lummis: 50–60% 60–70% 70–80% 80–90% Grayson: 40–50%
U.S. Representative before election
Cynthia Lummis
Republican
Elected U.S. Representative
Cynthia Lummis
Republican

The 2014 United States House of Representatives election in Wyoming was held on Tuesday, November 4, 2014 to elect the U.S. representative from Wyoming's at-large congressional district, who will represent the state of Wyoming in the 114th United States Congress. The election coincided with the elections of a U.S. Senator from Wyoming, the Governor of Wyoming and other federal and state offices.

== Republican primary ==
=== Candidates ===
==== Declared ====
- Cynthia Lummis, incumbent U.S. Representative
- Jason Adam Senteney, corrections officer at the Wyoming Medium Correctional Institution

=== Results ===
Republican primary results
Party	Candidate	Votes	%
Republican	Cynthia Lummis	70,918	71.41
Republican	Jason Senteney	22,251	22.40
Republican	Write-in	274	0.28
Republican	Over Votes	50	0.05
Republican	Under Votes	5,820	5.86
Total votes		99,313	100

== Democratic primary ==
=== Candidates ===
==== Declared ====
- Richard Grayson, attorney, college professor, fiction writer and perennial candidate from Arizona

=== Results ===
Democratic primary results
Party	Candidate	Votes	%
Democratic	Richard Grayson	14,209	77.62
Democratic	Write-in	190	1.04
Democratic	Over Votes	2	0.01
Democratic	Under Votes	3,905	21.33
Total votes		18,306	100

== Third parties ==
=== Constitution Party ===
==== Declared ====
- Daniel Clyde Cummings, physician and nominee for the seat in 2012

=== Libertarian Party ===
==== Declared ====
- Richard Brubaker, truck driver, nominee for the seat in 2012 and nominee for the State House in 2006, 2008 and 2010

== General election ==
=== Predictions ===
Source	Ranking	As of
The Cook Political Report	Safe R	November 3, 2014
Rothenberg	Safe R	October 24, 2014
Sabato's Crystal Ball	Safe R	October 30, 2014
RCP	Safe R	November 2, 2014
Daily Kos Elections	Safe R	November 4, 2014

=== Results ===
Wyoming's at-large congressional district, 2014
Party	Candidate	Votes	%	±%
Republican	Cynthia Lummis (incumbent)	113,038	68.47%	−0.22%
Democratic	Richard Grayson	37,803	22.90%	−0.93%
Libertarian	Richard Brubaker	7,112	4.31%	+0.82%
Constitution	Daniel Clyde Cummings	6,749	4.09%	+2.04%
n/a	Write-ins	398	0.24%	+0.07%
Total votes		'165,100'	'100.0%'	N/A
Republican hold				

== See also ==
- 2014 United States House of Representatives elections
- 2014 United States elections
