= Prince Mongo =

American businessman and local political personality (1936/1937–2026)

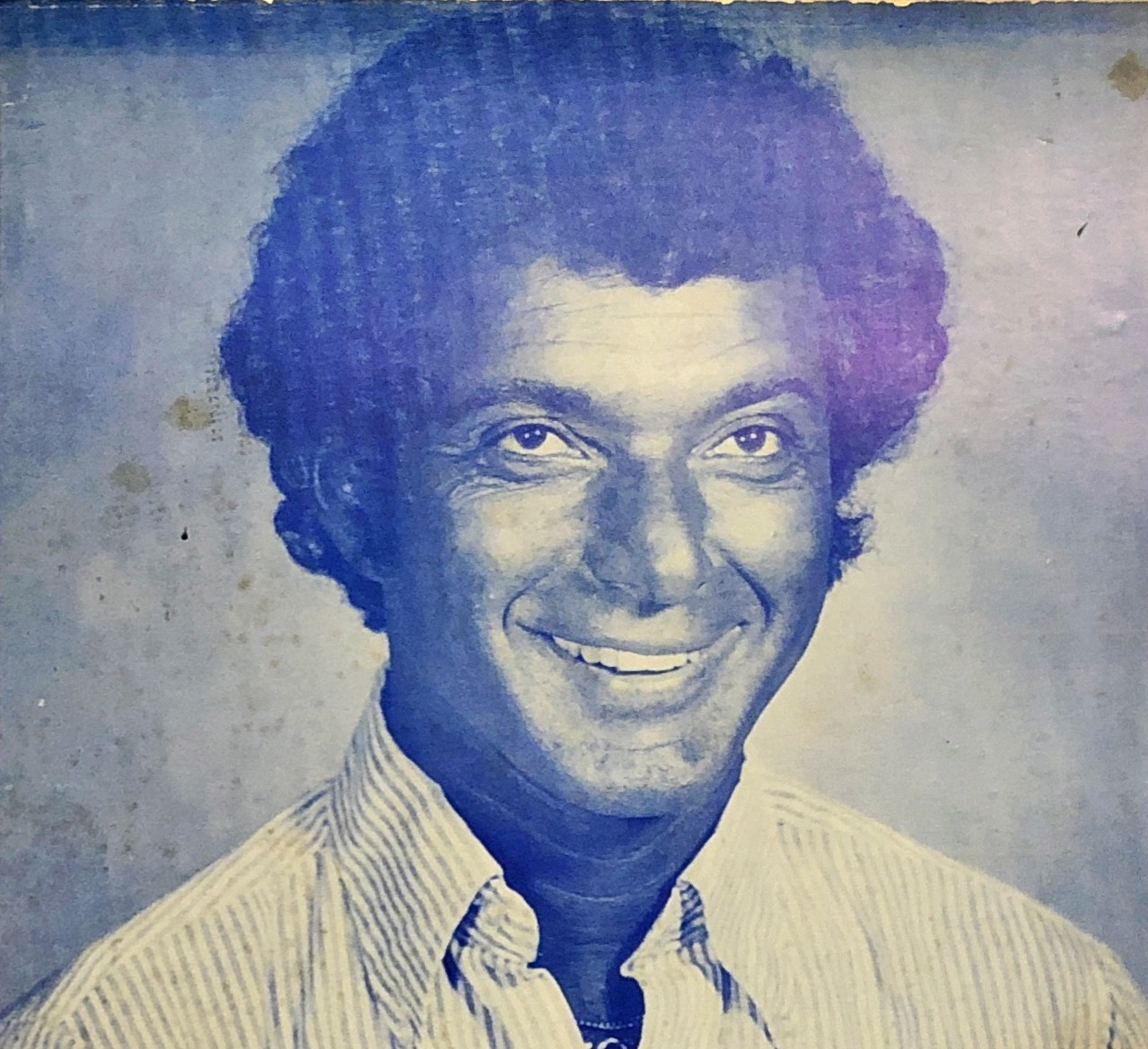
- Hodges c. 1970s
- Born: Robert Hodges; 1936 or 1937
- Died: August 10, 2026 (aged 89); Memphis, Tennessee, U.S.
- Occupations: Minor political personality, businessman
- Years active: 1978–2026
- Political party: Independent

Robert Hodges (1936 or 1937 – August 10, 2026), more commonly known by his self-styled moniker Prince Mongo, was an American businessman and minor local political personality in Memphis, Tennessee, who continuously ran for Mayor of Memphis and occasionally for Mayor of Shelby County from the 1970s. He tended to be known locally for his eccentric personality. Though much of his life remains unknown, he claimed to have been born on the planet Zambodia around 333 years ago.

== Mayoral campaigns and political positions ==
Prince Mongo continuously ran in every Memphis mayoral election as an independent from 1978 until his death, sometimes intermittently running for Mayor of Shelby County.

In Mongo's 1983 mayoral election, he announced that president Ronald Reagan had endorsed him. Mongo claimed he got a telegram from Reagan that read "Prince Mongo congratulations on your candidacy for mayor. Mongo, you have my solid support. From Bonzo [a reference to Reagan's Bedtime for Bonzo] to Mongo!" This is most likely untrue.

In the 1991 mayoral election, Prince Mongo got 2,000 votes, effectively putting him in third place. Despite this, he never acquired any political office.

His recurring campaigns ran on unusual proposals, such as the erection of casinos and prisons on Mud Island; the introduction of sharks into the Mississippi River and Memphis Harbor to prevent prisoner escapes; as well as weekly public hangings in Court Square that would each be scheduled to be hosted at specifically 3:33 PM.

A recurring campaign slogan was "Christmas Everyday".

In 2018, Prince Mongo expressed criticism of the removal of the Confederate statues of Nathan Bedford Forrest and Jefferson Davis.

== Zambodia ==
Zambodia is a fictional planet that Mongo said he was from. He claimed to be an ambassador to Earth, and the savior of Earth's inevitable self-destruction. He left Zambodia during the Stuart Restoration. Prince Mongo often performed traditions from this fictional planet in public. Zambodia is thought to be a spaceship from what Mongo had said.

== Personal life ==
Prince Mongo, also known as Robert Hodges, is known for what was his rather eccentric public persona. The details of Prince Mongo's life remain obscure or unknown, though he claimed that he was an ambassador from Zambodia where he was born 333 years ago. He claimed that he was "sent by the Zambodian spirits" to "save the City of Memphis" and "protect it from natural disasters". He always wore steampunk goggles and a long white wig in public, usually accompanied by flamboyant clothing. His reasoning for his seemingly odd appearance is that he just "damn well wants to".

He first got attention after putting garbage-themed art on his lawn at his Central Gardens home. He decided to run for mayor of Shelby County, Tennessee, and performed well; he then, since 1979, ran for mayor of Memphis, Tennessee and did not perform well electorally.

=== Properties ===
Prince Mongo had properties in Memphis, Tennessee, Virginia Beach, Virginia, Fort Lauderdale and Port Orange, Florida, and North Carolina.

Mongo owned Ashlar Hall in the 1990s. He purchased it after it was renovated by entrepreneur Steven Dunlap who turned it into a night club called The Castle. During Prince Mongo’s ownership, the building received the nickname "Prince Mongo's Castle".

=== Death ===
Prince Mongo died at a hospital in Memphis on August 10, 2026, at the age of 89. He had been hospitalised after falling from a ladder at his home in East Memphis earlier that day.

== Filmography ==
- American Pickers (2014) – Himself
- Memphis Connection (2022) – Himself
