= Bob Kelleher =

American attorney and perennial candidate

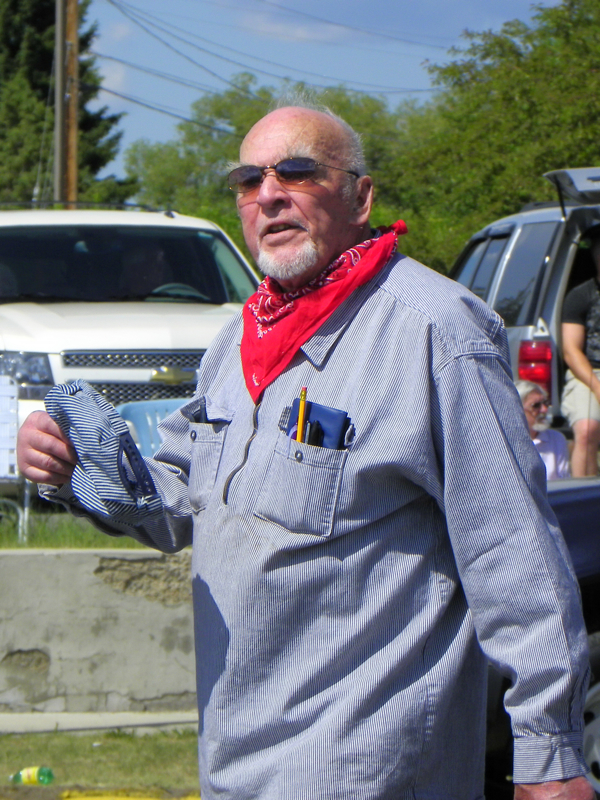

Personal details
- Born: March 30, 1923
- Died: May 29, 2011 (aged 88) Billings, Montana, U.S.
- Party: Democratic (before 2004); Green (2004); Republican (2008)
- Occupation: Lawyer, perennial candidate
- Known for: Numerous runs for public office in Montana

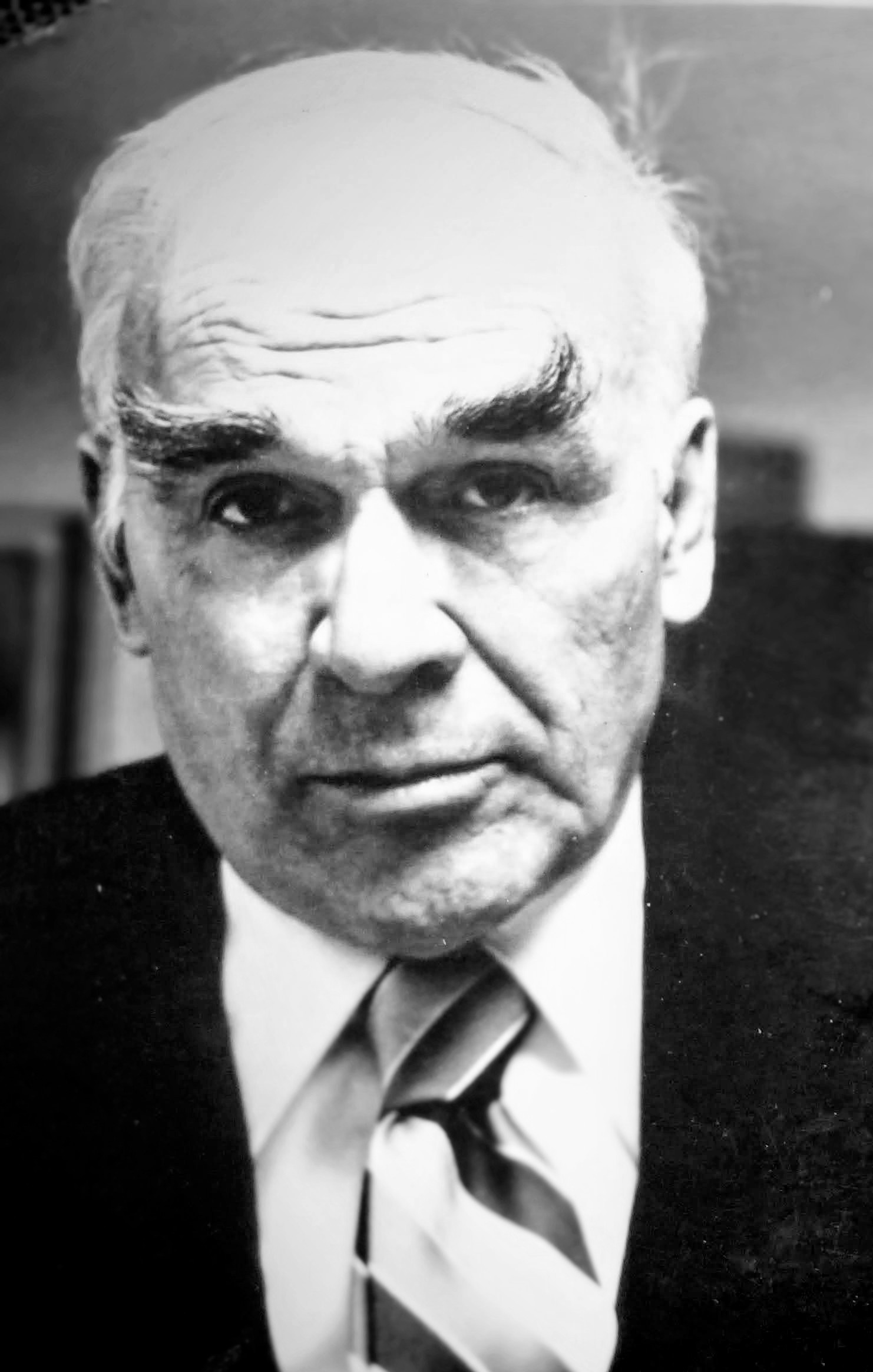
Robert Kelleher Sr

Robert Carlson Kelleher Sr. (March 30, 1923 – May 29, 2011), was an American attorney and perennial candidate. Starting in 1964, Kelleher ran for public office 16 times, at various times for the Democratic, Green and Republican parties. He ran for governor of Montana on five occasions, losing the Democratic primaries in 1980, 1984, 1992, and 1996; while running on the Green Party ticket in 2004. He was the Democratic Party nominee for the U.S. House of Representatives in Montana's 2nd congressional district in 1968, and the Republican Party nominee for the United States Senate in 2008.

Kelleher served in elected office during the 1972 Montana Constitutional Convention. He was a candidate for president of the United States in 1976, where he made the ballot in the Democratic primaries in New Hampshire, Massachusetts and Georgia.

== 2008 U.S. Senate election ==
In June 2008, he won a surprise victory in a five-way primary election for the Republican nomination against incumbent U.S. Senator Max Baucus. It was his second run against Baucus, whom he also challenged in the 2002 Senate race on the Green party ticket (2.3%). He also ran for the U.S. Senate in 1988. In the 2008 United States Senate election in Montana, he got 27% of the vote against Baucus. He was snubbed by the GOP post-nomination and received no funding.

Kelleher took many positions that were highly unorthodox by Republican Party standards, such as favoring more liberal drug control policies, supporting universal healthcare and affirmative action, and favoring fair trade restrictions. Erik Iverson, chairman of the Montana Republican Party, said, "Bob's ideology, with the exception that he's pro-life, doesn't even remotely resemble the platform of the Montana Republican Party."

== Personal life ==
Kelleher espoused a mix of left-wing and right-wing political views. He was best known for advocating that the United States adopt a parliamentary system of government. He opposed abortion, and also favored single-payer healthcare.

Kelleher spent most of his life in Billings, Montana. He died May 29, 2011, in Billings, Montana, a practicing lawyer until his death.

== See also ==
- 2008 United States Senate election in Montana

Party political offices
Preceded by N/A: First nominee	Green Party nominee for United States Senator from Montana (Class 2); 2002	Succeeded by N/A: No nominee
Preceded by Mike Taylor	Republican nominee for United States Senator from Montana (Class 2); 2008	Succeeded by Steve Daines
