= Richard Grayson (writer) =

American writer and activist (born 1951)

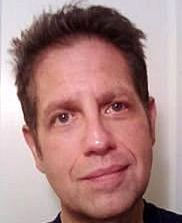
- Born: Richard Arnold Ginsberg; June 4, 1951 (age 75); New York City, US
- Education: Brooklyn College (BA, 1973; MFA, 1976); Richmond College (MA, 1975); University of Florida College of Law (JD, 1994)
- Occupations: Writer, political activist, performance artist, educator
- Notable work: With Hitler in New York; I Survived Caracas Traffic
- Political party: Democratic; No Labels; Green; Americans Elect
- Website: richardgrayson.com

Richard Grayson (born June 4, 1951, in Brooklyn, New York) is an American writer, political activist, performance artist, and perennial candidate most noted for his books of short stories and his satiric runs for public office.

Grayson's fiction is largely autobiographical, or pseudo-autobiographical.

== Early career ==
Grayson was born in 1951 and attended New York public schools, graduating from Midwood High School in 1968. He attended Brooklyn College and received a B.A. in political science in 1973 and an M.F.A. in creative writing in 1976. Grayson also received an M.A. in English from Richmond College (now The College of Staten Island) in 1975.

His stories began appearing in literary magazines in the mid-1970s, and in 1979, his first book-length collection of short stories, With Hitler in New York, was published. In the same year Grayson registered with the Federal Election Commission (FEC) as a candidate for Vice President of the United States, receiving coverage for his humorous "campaign".

By 1979, Grayson had over 125 stories published in magazines and anthologies. He remained a prolific writer in the early 1980s, when several short story collections came out in quick succession: Lincoln's Doctor's Dog (1982), Eating at Arby's (1982), and I Brake for Delmore Schwartz (1983). Most of these stories originally appeared in journals such as Transatlantic Review, Texas Quarterly, California Quarterly, and Epoch.

In 1981, Grayson received a $3,000 grant from the Florida Fine Arts Council for his fiction. In 1988, Grayson received a writer-in-residence award for from the New York State Council on the Arts to be the writer-in-residence at the Rockland Arts Center in West Nyack, New York. Grayson also won a $5,000 fellowship in literature/fiction from the Florida Division of Cultural Affairs in 1998.

Also in 1981, Grayson began a series of what he termed "publicity art," getting media attention for creating a fan club and fan magazine for his grandmother and starting a campaign to draft Burt Reynolds as a Republican candidate for the U.S. Senate from Florida. Grayson also filed a political action committee to draft Ruhollah Khomeini of Iran to run for the U.S. House of Representatives from Brooklyn in order to "neutralize" the Ayatollah during the Iran hostage crisis, saying that if elected, "Khomeini would be as ineffective as any other congressman."

== Political activity ==
In 1982, Grayson ran for a seat on the town council in Davie, Florida on a platform advocating that the town's numerous horses be given the right to vote. A Miami Herald editorial endorsed his opponent, calling Grayson's candidacy "some kind of wry joke."

In 1983, Grayson filed with the Federal Election Commission (FEC) to run for President of the United States in 1984 as a Democrat. Over the next year, the exploits in his humorous campaign to replace President Ronald Reagan were widely covered in the media. In November 1983, Grayson took part in a series of debates with other minor presidential candidates at shopping malls in Florida.

To help raise money for the financially struggling Donald Trump in 1990, Grayson, with "tongue firmly in cheek," created the Trump Rescue Fund in 1990, soliciting money for the billionaire on the streets of New York, though a Trump Tower employee shooed Grayson and his hand-lettered flyers away from the building. Later in 1990, as the economy faltered, Grayson appeared on CNN touting Pauper, a magazine featuring "articles about poor celebrities, bankrupt businesses, failed financial institutions, [and] tips on frugal living." A "Pauper 400" list would "answer the lists of the super-rich in 'wealth-oriented magazines.'"

In September 1991, Grayson spoke at a public hearing of the Florida Redistricting Commission, showing his drawings of legislative districts configured like a palm tree, the Space Shuttle, the sun, a boat and an alligator, saying that districts in recognizable shapes would get more voters interested in state government.

During the 1994 elections, upset at how many Republican U.S. House members of Florida were unopposed by Democrats, Grayson filed with the Division of Elections as a write-in candidate to run against Representative Michael Bilirakis in Florida's 9th congressional district in the Tampa Bay area although Grayson lived outside the district, in Gainesville. Despite naming his political campaign committee "God Hates Republicans," Grayson received only 157 write-in votes.

In the 1996 election, Grayson filed as a write-in candidate against Rep. Ileana Ros-Lehtinen, a Republican who was otherwise unopposed in the Miami-based 18th congressional district.

For the 2004 elections, Grayson again filed to run as a write-in candidate in the election against an otherwise unopposed Florida Republican U.S. House member, Ander Crenshaw. After winning the endorsement of John B. Anderson, an independent candidate for president in 1980, Grayson told Broward Palm Beach New Times, "What I'm doing now is not quite a joke...I'm trying to make a point. In Florida, we have a system where, if one candidate files for an office and no other candidate files, then there's no election." In the conservative 4th congressional district in northern Florida, Grayson supported legal recognition of same-sex marriage, socialized medicine, a $10 an hour minimum wage, repeal of President George W. Bush's tax cuts, and immediate withdrawal of U.S. troops from Iraq; Grayson did not set foot in the district until October 2, 2004, when he did a television spot at a Jacksonville CBS affiliate. Grayson received less than 1% of the vote.

Grayson became the Green Party nominee for Arizona's 6th congressional district in the 2010 election after winning the party's primary with six write-in votes. The Green Party sued Grayson and other party nominees, claiming they were "sham" candidates who should be removed from the November ballot. A federal judge ruled in favor of Grayson and other Green Party primary winners.

Grayson ran for president again in the 2012 election, this time in the Green Party's Arizona presidential primary and was endorsed by the Tucson Weekly, which noted "we have been most impressed with Richard Grayson, including his plan to deport Republicans back to the 18th century, where they could be more comfortable with their tricorner hats and other Tea Party garb, and his demand that Pinal County Sheriff Paul Babeu be nicer to his ex-boyfriends." In a field of six candidates, Grayson finished in a tie for third place, with 39 votes.

Later in 2012, Grayson changed his voter registration to the new Americans Elect party and in the primary, he won the nomination to run in Arizona's 4th congressional district. Grayson finished fourth in the general election, receiving 1% of the vote in November 2012.

In the 2014 election, running unopposed, Grayson won the Democratic nomination for Wyoming's at-large congressional district. When Grayson ran as a "hip-hop candidate," with a campaign committee called PPLZ 4 GRAYSON CREW, the head of the Wyoming Democratic party said of his campaign, "I am not thrilled with it." The only endorsement Grayson received came from United Auto Workers. In November 2014, Grayson garnered 23% of the vote running against Republican Congresswoman Cynthia Lummis. Despite not campaigning, spending any money, or visiting Wyoming, Grayson managed to beat Lummis 46% to 43% in Teton County. For the 2016 election, he filed to run again for Congress in Wyoming, but quit when a local Democrat entered the race.

Grayson won another Green Party primary in 2018, this time for the election for state representative in Arizona's 16th legislative district. When no Democrat filed to oppose Kelly Townsend for state senator in the same district in the 2020 election, Grayson filed as a write-in candidate "for those Democrats and others who hate Trump Republicans."

In 2022, with no Democrat on the ballot in Arizona's 9th congressional district, Grayson ran a write-in campaign against incumbent Republican U.S. Representative Paul Gosar, receiving 3,531 votes to Gosar's 192,976 votes. Although the No Labels organization asserted that it was not a political party and would not run candidates for offices other than President and Vice President in 2024, Grayson announced he would run in the 2024 Arizona primary as a local candidate of the No Labels Party.

Grayson was a candidate in 2025 for the special election held in the 7th district for the No Labels political organization. He garnered 537 votes or 0.53% of the total votes cast.

Grayson was a candidate in the 2026 United States Senate election in Alaska for the Green Party. He garnered 0.3% of the total votes cast in the primary.

== Social activism and writing ==
Grayson's experience as a lawyer and gay activist informed some of the stories in his 1996 collection, I Survived Caracas Traffic, whose title story Kirkus Reviews called "a resonant meditation on the themes of relationships, AIDS, and mortality." Another story in the same volume is "Twelve Step Barbie," which, along with "With Hitler in New York" is probably the author's best-known work and the subject of academic criticism. The New York Times Book Review called the book "far too bright and keenly made to flick casually away.

In New York in June 1990, Grayson created Radio Free Broward, a service to mail copies of the 2 Live Crew album As Nasty as They Wanna Be to residents of South Florida, where a federal judge had ruled it obscene and where a record store owner was arrested for selling it. Grayson attended the Fort Lauderdale obscenity trials related to the album the following autumn and winter.

As a staff attorney in social policy at the Center for Governmental Responsibility at the University of Florida Law School, Grayson began writing op-ed columns for various Florida newspapers opposing proposed laws limiting the rights of gay speakers on college campuses, reinstating chain gangs in prisons, charging lottery winners for past welfare payments, and randomly testing students in middle and high school students for drugs, along with Florida's then-existing ban on adoptions by LGBT parents.

In addition to teaching at Broward Community College, Grayson has taught at Long Island University, Brooklyn College, Kingsborough Community College and The School of Visual Arts in New York; Santa Fe Community College, Florida Atlantic University and Nova Southeastern University in Florida; and Arizona State University and Mesa Community College in Arizona. He has also led workshops at writers' conference, including those at Winthrop College (now Winthrop University) and Francis Marion College (now Francis Marion University) in South Carolina.

== Recent work ==
Grayson originally published some of the gay-themed stories in The Silicon Valley Diet on early internet sites that featured short fiction. In 2004 he appeared in various literary webzines with his memoirs, satire, and stories. His "Diary of a Congressional Candidate in Florida's Fourth Congressional District," a recurring feature on the website of McSweeney's, covered his 2004 campaign as the sole opponent to Rep. Crenshaw.

More recently, Grayson published two short story collections almost simultaneously. The more experimental book was Highly Irregular Stories (2006), which Kirkus called "an eclectic anthology of intriguing short stories...Grayson's stories here recall no one so much as Richard Brautigan, who walked a similar line between wit and warmth in his more eccentric novels." In its review of the book, Hipster Book Club said, "The funny stuff in Highly Irregular Stories is not just mildly amusing but actually laugh-out-loud funny."

The second volume, And to Think That He Kissed Him on Lorimer Street (2006), which Kirkus termed "[a] funny, odd, somehow familiar and fully convincing fictional world," featured more representational and autobiographical stories, set mostly in Brooklyn.

In 2008, Grayson self-published a book featuring some uncollected stories from three decades under the title Who Will Kiss the Pig?: Sex Stories for Teens. Kirkus called the book "[f]unny, pleasurable and often prescient short fiction that delivers many more hits than misses," but most of the media attention came from Gawker and Gothamist after Grayson placed a Craigslist ad that began, "Cool Brooklyn book publisher looking for cool 18-25yo hipsters to blurb our cool forthcoming book of sex stories for teens."

In 2009, Grayson's writing also appeared in the anthology Life As We Show It: Writing on Film and the chapbooks The Tao Shoplifting Crisis and I Hate All of You on This L Train.

While the Dictionary of Literary Biography has called Grayson "a marginal figure in contemporary American fiction," it also noted that "he and his fictional persona seem quite aware of this fact" and that "taken as a body of work, Grayson's short fiction ultimately appears to be one ongoing, career-long writing project, focused always on the effects of contemporary culture on the self."
