= Hysham, Montana =

- Town
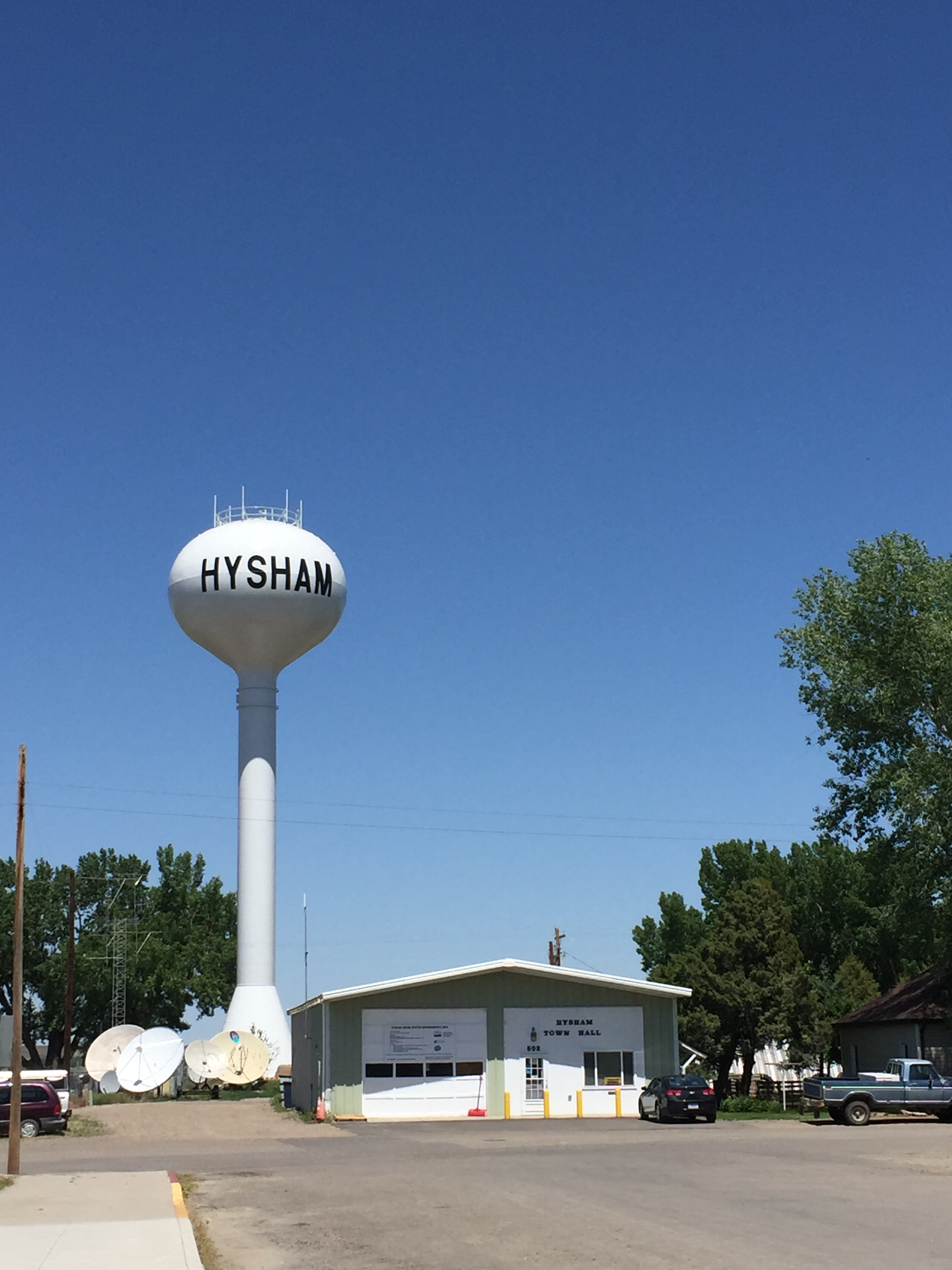
- Haysham Town Hall

- Location of Hysham, Montana
- Coordinates: 46°17′26″N 107°13′48″W
- Country: United States
- State: Montana
- County: Treasure

Area
  - Total: 0.22 sq mi (0.57 km^{2})
  - Land: 0.22 sq mi (0.57 km^{2})
  - Water: 0 sq mi (0.00 km^{2})
- Elevation: 2,661 ft (811 m)

Population (2020)
  - Total: 276
  - Density: 1,261.3/sq mi (486.98/km^{2})
- Time zone: UTC-7 (Mountain (MST))
  - Summer (DST): UTC-6 (MDT)
- ZIP codes: 59038, 59076
- Area code: 406
- FIPS code: 30-38350
- GNIS feature ID: 0772654
- Website: www.townofhysham.com

Hysham is a town in and the county seat of Treasure County, Montana, United States. The population was 276 at the 2020 census.

== History ==
When the Montana Territory became the state of Montana in 1889 the future site of Hysham was just a blank spot in the rolling prairie along the Yellowstone River. At that time, the area was within sprawling Custer County, which covered much of eastern Montana, and also included the eastern part of the Crow Indian Reservation. The area was opened up to homesteading in 1906 after the federal government moved the Crow Indian Reservation boundary further west to its present location. This made possible the development of farms and ranches throughout the area and at the same time allowed the settlement of small towns like Hysham.

The location and founding of the town of Hysham is intertwined with its ranching and railroad history. A large cattle ranch, the Flying E, ran thousands of heads of cattle in the region. Charlie J. Hysham had moved from the town of Red Oak, Iowa, to manage the ranch. In order to facilitate the delivery of the large amounts of supplies the Flying E ranch required, the Northern Pacific Railroad built a siding to unload goods and materials that Hysham had ordered from Billings and Forsyth. In 1907, the siding became the nucleus for the town of Hysham. James O. Lockard built the first building on the future site of Hysham shortly after the area was open to homesteading. Later, his homestead south of the railroad tracks would become the "Lockard Addition" in Hysham. The general store was located north of the railroad tracks and also served as Hysham's first post office with Lockard appointed the first postmaster. Hysham slowly grew by a general process typical throughout the frontier where an initial commercial or transportation need would establish the site, which would then grow as settlers homesteaded nearby. This would, in turn, resulted in the need for other commercial enterprises followed by schools, churches, banks, government and other civic institutions (Sanborn 1920).

In 1906 there were two stores, a lumber yard and a blacksmith shop. The first school at the growing community was built in 1908. Ada Channel, who had a homestead near the railroad siding, became the school's first teacher. She was also a key figure in the formation of Hysham. This same year, she worked to locate a town site with the help of James Lockard and F. L. Baker. The three town founders plotted town lots on 40 acres (160,000 m^{2}) of Channel's homestead. E. C. Sampson completed the process with a survey, which established the town's streets. Two other additions were added later. The First Addition added 40 acres (160,000 m^{2}) south of the original site and the Rogers Addition was established north of the railroad depot. Even though Charlie Hysham had moved away from the area by this time, the new town was named Hysham in his honor. The town was officially incorporated in 1916 (Sanborn 1920).

As more families were attracted to the area, more businesses were established. Town mayor, James Lyndes, started a real estate business with C. M. Patterson and opened a law office. He served as the first County Attorney and Hysham's first Mayor. Lyndes' wife Mary Alice served as chairman of the school board and for the first few years, the high school was held above the Lyndes and Patterson store. Also among the first town's residents were F. L. and Christiania Baker. Baker owned a threshing machine and did custom threshing.

Another phase of the community development process usually occurred after the initial settlers became established and then encouraged friends and relatives to move to the area. Such was the case with the Lyndes family. After James Lyndes set up his law and real estate business, four of his brothers: Bert, Wallace, Elmer and C. W. "Kid" and their families, became some of the earliest Hysham residents.

With the growth of commercial and agricultural businesses came the need for banks to finance the economic growth. The first bank in Hysham was the First National Bank, established in 1910, with J. W. Wagner serving as president. The bank continued to serve the community for more than half a century. Five years later, C. C. Jordan gambled on the boom caused by World War I and opened the Treasure State Bank. However, this bank was not as fortunate as its predecessor and ran into hard times with the post-war recession and a brutal winter in 1919, which severely damaged many of the area's cattle ranches. It was forced to close in 1922, which further hurt many local ranchers who had invested heavily in the bank.

For the most part, however, the 1910s were a period of prosperity. Hysham boasted of concrete sidewalks with modern infrastructure including electric lights, telephone, water, and sewer. New businesses included an International Harvester dealership, a drug store, a hotel, the Pin-Con confections and ice cream parlor, a hardware business, a grocery store, the Rosebud Flour mill, a grain elevator, a butcher shop, a bakery, the Hysham Echo newspaper, a barber shop and pool hall as well as other enterprises. Besides new businesses, the decade saw the establishment of many social institutions such as the Hysham Community Church, the Presbyterian Church, the Hysham School, the Hysham Women's Club and the Buffington Hall, which was used for dances, basketball games, community meetings and other programs until it burned down in 1939.

Another development, which occurred during the 1910s, was the improvement of the area's road system. In 1914, the Montana State Highway Commission placed the "Yellowstone Trail" county road between Custer and Hysham on the Federal-Aid highway system. The road eventually followed a county road that ran just south of the Yellowstone River, crossing it over the Myers Bridge, which was a multi-span steel through truss span built in 1907. Other roads were either constructed or improved during this period (Axline 1991).

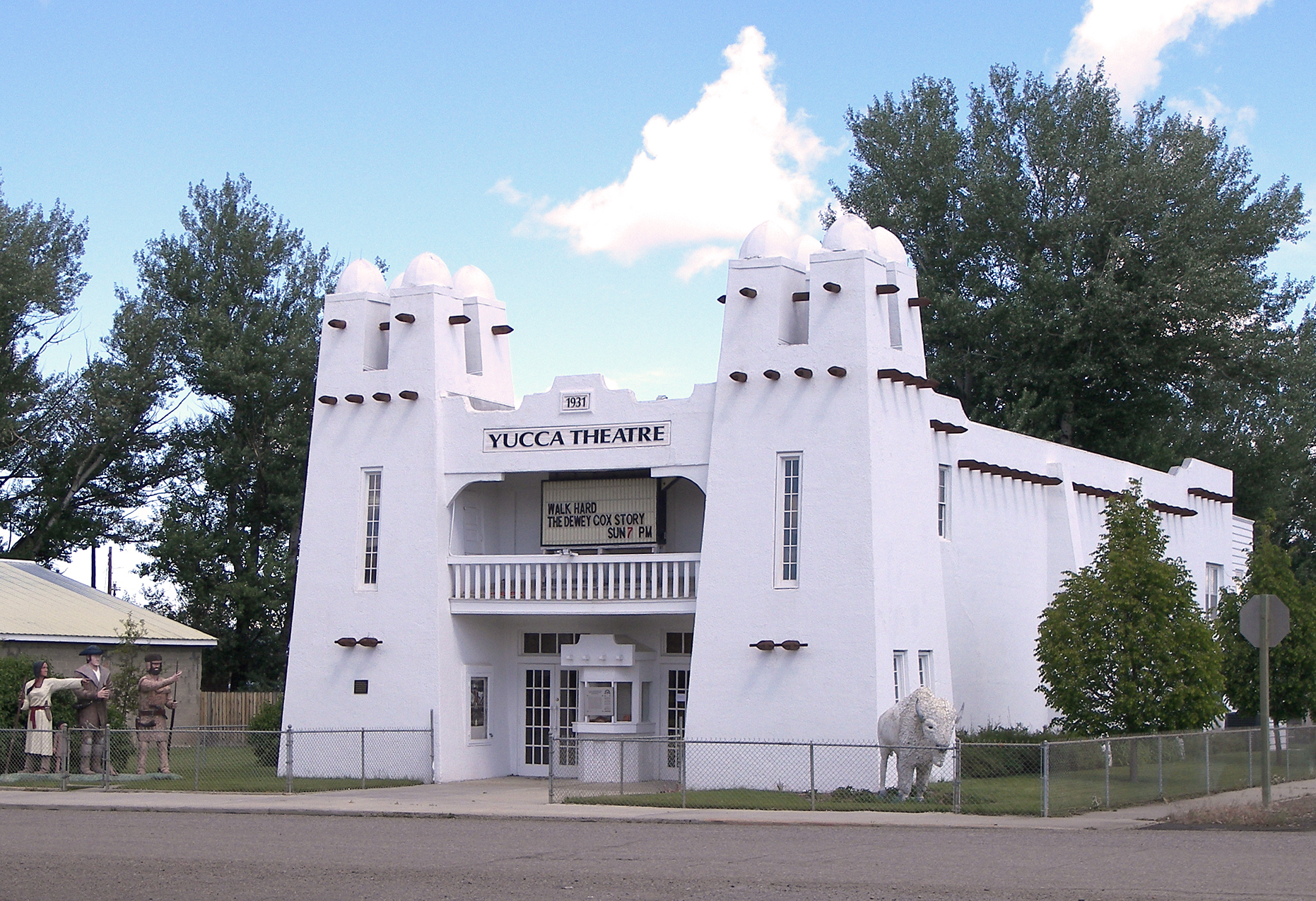
The Yucca Theatre. The building was added to the National Register of Historic Places on January 7, 1994.

Symbolic of this perseverance in the face of adversity, was the construction of the Yucca Theatre in 1931 by local businessman and politician, David M. Manning and his brother Jim Manning, just when the nationwide depression was at its nadir. This striking building is in the Mission style, which may have been the result of Manning's time spent in the Southwest where he would have seen similar buildings. However, it was unique to the Hysham area and undoubtedly was a source of civic pride to the community and does to this day show movies every Sunday. (U.S. Department of Interior 1993).

Manning went on to become the owner or part owner of five different businesses; he helped build the city swimming pool and city water system; he built two dams in the Hysham area and improved the irrigation system. In addition to his many projects and businesses in Hysham, he also served in the Montana legislature where he was instrumental in promoting rural electrification and highway construction (U.S. Department of Interior 1993). After 52 continuous years of service (1933–1985), he retired as Dean of the Montana Senate and senior state legislator in the nation (Andrea Merrill-Maker, Montana Almanac, p. 159).

== Geography ==
According to the United States Census Bureau, the town has a total area of 0.21 square miles (0.54 km^{2}), all land.

Hysham is bordered to the north by the Yellowstone River. The surrounding area is composed of rolling hills and farmland.

=== Climate ===
According to the Köppen Climate Classification system, Hysham has a hot-summer humid continental climate, abbreviated "Dfa" on climate maps.

Climate data for Hysham, Montana, 1991–2020 normals, extremes 1945–present
Month	Jan	Feb	Mar	Apr	May	Jun	Jul	Aug	Sep	Oct	Nov	Dec	Year
Record high °F (°C)	72 (22)	75 (24)	82 (28)	97 (36)	100 (38)	107 (42)	111 (44)	108 (42)	105 (41)	93 (34)	79 (26)	70 (21)	111 (44)
Mean maximum °F (°C)	55.9 (13.3)	59.2 (15.1)	71.7 (22.1)	80.7 (27.1)	86.6 (30.3)	93.6 (34.2)	98.4 (36.9)	96.7 (35.9)	91.9 (33.3)	81.5 (27.5)	67.9 (19.9)	56.6 (13.7)	99.3 (37.4)
Mean daily maximum °F (°C)	34.7 (1.5)	38.7 (3.7)	50.5 (10.3)	60.5 (15.8)	69.8 (21.0)	78.7 (25.9)	87.6 (30.9)	86.0 (30.0)	75.3 (24.1)	60.4 (15.8)	46.7 (8.2)	36.2 (2.3)	60.4 (15.8)
Daily mean °F (°C)	23.6 (−4.7)	27.0 (−2.8)	37.1 (2.8)	46.8 (8.2)	56.1 (13.4)	65.2 (18.4)	72.5 (22.5)	70.6 (21.4)	60.4 (15.8)	47.3 (8.5)	34.9 (1.6)	25.4 (−3.7)	47.2 (8.4)
Mean daily minimum °F (°C)	12.4 (−10.9)	15.3 (−9.3)	23.8 (−4.6)	33.0 (0.6)	42.5 (5.8)	51.7 (10.9)	57.5 (14.2)	55.1 (12.8)	45.5 (7.5)	34.2 (1.2)	23.1 (−4.9)	14.7 (−9.6)	34.1 (1.1)
Mean minimum °F (°C)	−15.1 (−26.2)	−9.3 (−22.9)	0.7 (−17.4)	18.0 (−7.8)	28.5 (−1.9)	40.4 (4.7)	48.6 (9.2)	44.2 (6.8)	31.8 (−0.1)	17.1 (−8.3)	0.8 (−17.3)	−8.7 (−22.6)	−24.1 (−31.2)
Record low °F (°C)	−48 (−44)	−38 (−39)	−36 (−38)	4 (−16)	14 (−10)	29 (−2)	37 (3)	32 (0)	19 (−7)	−9 (−23)	−31 (−35)	−46 (−43)	−48 (−44)
Average precipitation inches (mm)	0.61 (15)	0.58 (15)	0.80 (20)	1.72 (44)	2.47 (63)	2.22 (56)	1.51 (38)	1.16 (29)	1.40 (36)	1.38 (35)	0.59 (15)	0.48 (12)	14.92 (378)
Average snowfall inches (cm)	8.3 (21)	5.4 (14)	5.6 (14)	2.5 (6.4)	0.8 (2.0)	0.0 (0.0)	0.0 (0.0)	0.0 (0.0)	0.1 (0.25)	2.7 (6.9)	4.2 (11)	7.5 (19)	37.1 (94.55)
Average precipitation days (≥ 0.01 in)	5.1	4.9	5.8	7.3	8.8	8.6	6.1	4.5	5.3	6.4	4.6	4.7	72.1
Average snowy days (≥ 0.1 in)	4.0	3.8	2.3	1.0	0.2	0.0	0.0	0.0	0.0	1.0	2.5	3.8	18.6
Source 1: NOAA
Source 2: National Weather Service

== Demographics ==
Historical population
Census	Pop.	Note	%±
1920	360		—
1930	258		−28.3%
1940	392		51.9%
1950	410		4.6%
1960	494		20.5%
1970	373		−24.5%
1980	449		20.4%
1990	361		−19.6%
2000	330		−8.6%
2010	312		−5.5%
2020	276		−11.5%
U.S. Decennial Census

=== 2010 census ===
As of the census of 2010, there were 312 people, 145 households, and 94 families residing in the town. The population density was 1,485.7 inhabitants per square mile (573.6/km^{2}). There were 175 housing units at an average density of 833.3 per square mile (321.7/km^{2}). The racial makeup of the town was 92.6% White, 1.9% Native American, 1.0% Asian, and 4.5% from two or more races. Hispanic or Latino of any race were 2.6% of the population.

There were 145 households, of which 20.7% had children under the age of 18 living with them, 55.9% were married couples living together, 3.4% had a female householder with no husband present, 5.5% had a male householder with no wife present, and 35.2% were non-families. 33.1% of all households were made up of individuals, and 15.9% had someone living alone who was 65 years of age or older. The average household size was 2.15 and the average family size was 2.69.

The median age in the town was 52.8 years. 18.9% of residents were under the age of 18; 4.5% were between the ages of 18 and 24; 14.4% were from 25 to 44; 34% were from 45 to 64; and 28.2% were 65 years of age or older. The gender makeup of the town was 50.3% male and 49.7% female.

=== 2000 census ===
As of the census of 2000, there were 330 people, 150 households, and 91 families residing in the town. The population density was 1,574.8 inhabitants per square mile (608.0/km^{2}). There were 172 housing units at an average density of 820.8 per square mile (316.9/km^{2}). The racial makeup of the town was 94.55% White, 3.94% Native American, 0.30% Asian, and 1.21% from two or more races. Hispanic or Latino of any race were 0.91% of the population.

There were 150 households, out of which 24.0% had children under the age of 18 living with them, 52.0% were married couples living together, 5.3% had a female householder with no husband present, and 38.7% were non-families. 37.3% of all households were made up of individuals, and 21.3% had someone living alone who was 65 years of age or older. The average household size was 2.20 and the average family size was 2.83.

In the town, the population was spread out, with 25.5% under the age of 18, 4.5% from 18 to 24, 18.2% from 25 to 44, 31.2% from 45 to 64, and 20.6% who were 65 years of age or older. The median age was 46 years. For every 100 females there were 96.4 males. For every 100 females age 18 and over, there were 90.7 males.

The median income for a household in the town was $30,179, and the median income for a family was $39,063. Males had a median income of $31,250 versus $18,750 for females. The per capita income for the town was $15,743. About 5.8% of families and 13.4% of the population were below the poverty line, including 20.2% of those under age 18 and 9.6% of those age 65 or over.

== Arts and culture ==
The Treasure County 89'ers Museum has exhibits on local history that span from fossils, the Crow people, the Lewis and Clark Expedition, up to the homesteaders. The complex also includes the Yucca Theatre and the David M. Manning home.

== Government ==
Hysham has a mayor and town council. Kenneth Rolandson was unopposed in his re-election for mayor in November 2025. He became mayor in 2023 after Larry Fink left office.

== Education ==
Hysham Public Schools educates students from kindergarten through 12th grade. Hysham High School's team name is the Rebels.

== Infrastructure ==
In December 2022 the town was placed on a water boil advisory after experiencing multiple failures at the treatment plant. On May 2, 2023 Montana Department of Environmental Quality upgraded to a Do Not Consume Advisory. On December 8, 2023 the town was cleared to drink city water. According to the town's director of public works the town spent around $700,000-$800,000 to fix the filtration system.

The Hysham Airport is a public use airport located two miles east of town. The nearest commercial airport is Billings Logan International Airport.

== Notable people ==
- Cass Bauer-Bilodeau, former women's basketball player, was born in Hysham
- David M. Manning, architect, business owner, and state politician
- Lee Nye, photographer, was born in Hysham

== Bibliography ==
- Axline, Jon, 1991. "Montana Cultural Resource Inventory Form, Buckingham Coulee Bridge (24TE44)." Montana State Historic Preservation Office, Helena, Montana.
- Carrington, Ruth (editor) and Edna Mackley, 1976. Tales of Treasure County: Historical Essays by Residents of Treasure County, Montana. Treasure County Bicentennial Commission.
- Cheney, Roberta Carkeek, 1975. Names on the Face of Montana, Mountain Press, Missoula, Montana.
- Kimball, Ray, 1976. "Hysham," (In Carrington and Mackley, Tales of Treasure County). Treasure County Bicentennial Commission).
- Malone, Michael P. and Richard W. Etulain, 1989. The American West: A Twentieth-Century History. University of Nebraska Press, Lincoln, Nebraska.
- Malone, Michael P., Richard B. Roeder and William L. Lang, 1991. Montana, A History of Two Centuries. University of Washington Press, Seattle and London.
- Montana State Historic Preservation Office, 1999. "Montana Historical and Architectural Inventory Form, Hysham Post Office (24TE107)." Montana State Historic Preservation Office, Helena, Montana.
- Mulloy, William T., 1958. "A Preliminary Historical Outline for the Northwestern Plains." University of Wyoming Publications in Science 22 (1). Laramie.
- Sanborn Map Company, 1920. "Hysham Fire Insurance Map (corrected in 1927 and 1937)." New York City.
- Treasure County Assessor. Treasure County Assessor Records, Hysham, Montana.
- United States Department of the Interior, 1993. "National Register of Historic Places Registration Form for the Yucca Theatre (24TE54)." U.S. Department of the Interior, National Park Service, Interagency Resources Division, National Register of Historic Places.
