= 47 percent =

2012 pejorative phrase by Mitt Romney

"47 percent" is a pejorative phrase from a 2012 U.S. presidential campaign speech made by Republican candidate Mitt Romney on May 17, 2012, at a private fundraiser. In the speech, Romney talked disparagingly about the "47 percent" of the population who are "with [Barack Obama], who are dependent upon government, who believe that they are victims." A video of the speech, covertly recorded by a bartender at the event, was released by Mother Jones a month before the election. The speech's publication is regarded as having helped Obama, the Democratic incumbent, win a second term in office.

== Background ==
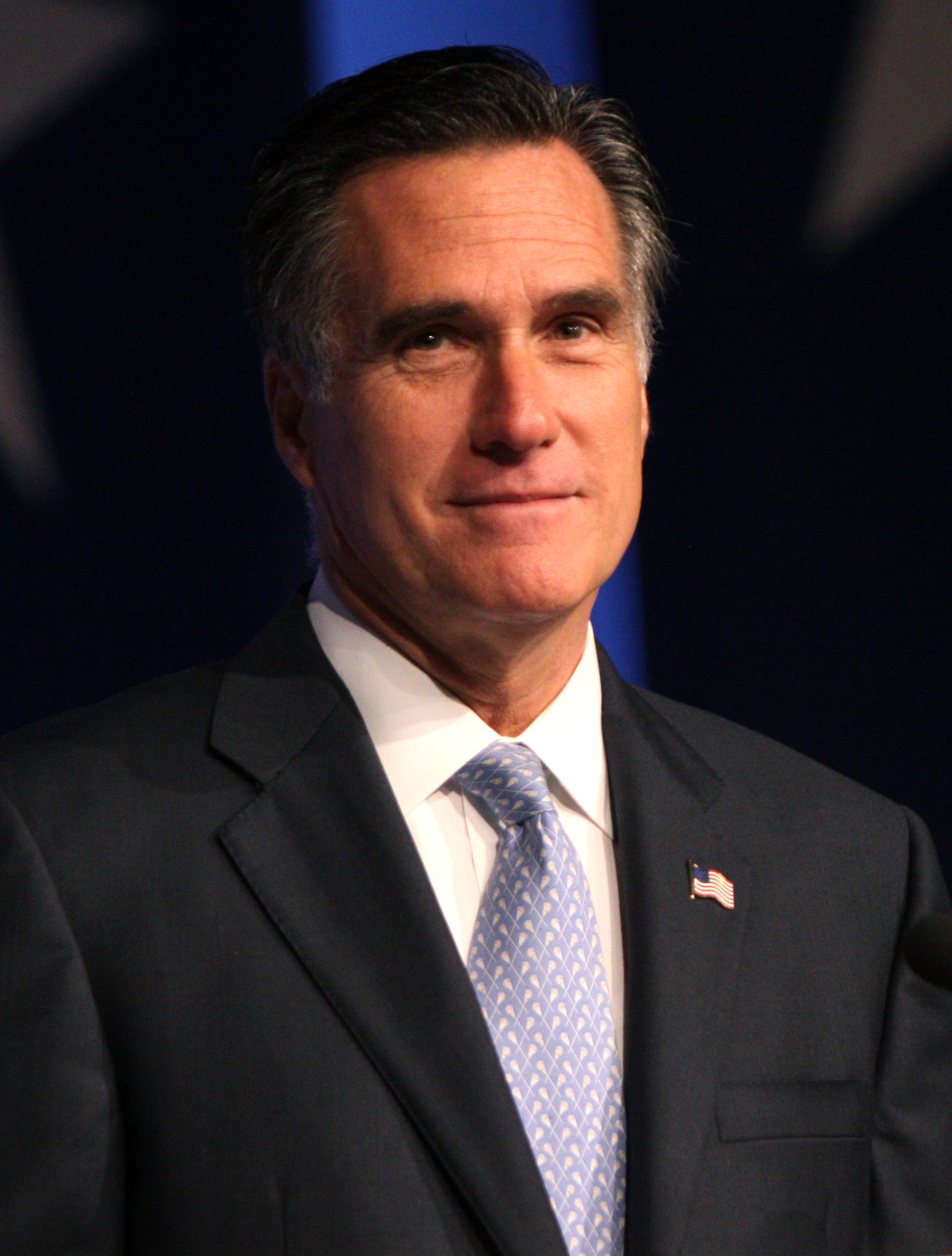
Romney in 2011

On May 17, 2012, Mitt Romney attended a private fundraiser at the home of Marc Leder, a private equity investor, in Boca Raton, Florida. Donors at the event had paid $50,000 each to see Romney, who was the presumptive Republican presidential nominee at the time.

At the event, Romney told donors: "there are 47 percent of the people who will vote for the president no matter what. All right, there are 47 percent who are with him, who are dependent upon government, who believe that they are victims, who believe the government has a responsibility to care for them, who believe that they are entitled to health care, to food, to housing, to you name it. That, that's an entitlement. And the government should give it to them. And they will vote for this president no matter what."

Romney continued: "my job is not to worry about those people. I'll never convince them they should take personal responsibility and care for their lives." The 47 percent figure referenced the finding, widely reported at the time, that approximately 47 percent of American households had paid no federal income tax in a given year. The Tax Policy Center found that in 2009, following the financial crisis, 17 percent of American households did not pay federal income tax or payroll tax; this sector was primarily made up of the elderly, students, and the disabled.

=== Recording and publication ===
External videos
- Footage of Romney's speech (2012)

Scott Prouty, a bartender working the event, had brought a camera to the dinner after hearing that, at previous events, Romney would take photos with the staff. As Romney spoke, Prouty began to record what he was saying. He later said he had no "anti-Romney agenda" going into the evening and had no idea Romney would say what he said.

Shortly after the May 17 fundraiser, Prouty posted a brief clip—in which Romney described conditions inside a Chinese factory—on YouTube. In a further bid to attract attention, he posted links to clips and anonymous comments about them in the comment sections of HuffPost and Daily Kos.

Prouty eventually made contact with David Corn, the Washington bureau chief of Mother Jones, who spent approximately four weeks persuading Prouty to hand over the full, undoctored video. Prouty reached Corn through James Carter—the grandson of former president Jimmy Carter—who worked as Corn's research assistant.

On September 17, 2012, Mother Jones published the video in two parts, as it had been received from Prouty in two separate files. Corn told Politico that "the device that was being used inadvertently shut down or timed-out," and that at most one to two minutes of footage had been missed. Within 24 hours of its publication, the recording of Romney's speech had over 1.9 million views on YouTube. The gap in the recording attracted attention from a number of conservatives, including political commentator Joel Pollak, who stated that there was "reason to suspect manipulation".

== Reaction ==
Speaking to reporters after the video was released, Romney declined to retract the comments, saying that while his remarks were "not elegantly stated," he stood by them. "Those who are reliant on government are not as attracted to my message of slimming down the size of government," he said. On October 5, 2012, Romney retracted his remarks, describing them to Fox News as "completely wrong". Romney's running mate, Paul Ryan, called the remarks "inarticulate."

Both the Obama campaign and its associated super PAC, Priorities USA, began airing ads criticizing Romney's remarks. Obama campaign manager Jim Messina described Romney's remarks as "shocking" and commented that it was "hard to serve as president for all Americans when you've disdainfully written off half the nation". In an interview, Obama himself told David Letterman that "my expectation is if you want to be president, you've got to work for everybody, not just for some".

Conservative columnist Peggy Noonan called the Romney campaign "incompetent" and "a rolling calamity", arguing that the campaign "needs a new CEO". Columnist David Brooks wrote that Romney was "running a depressingly inept presidential campaign". Several Republicans campaigning for seats in the 2012 election disputed or criticized Romney's remarks, including Senate candidates Linda McMahon in Connecticut, George Allen in Virginia, Dean Heller in Nevada, Scott Brown in Romney's home state of Massachusetts, and Susana Martinez in New Mexico. A number of conservative Republicans, including Laura Ingraham and Rush Limbaugh, defended Romney's remarks.

PolitiFact rated Romney's remarks as factually true, assuming Romney was referring to the federal income tax—the reasons being that many Americans were so poor as to be exempt from it, and that others qualified for enough breaks and other exemptions that their tax liability amounted to zero.

Within days of the video's publication, the satirical Tumblr blog "We Are the 47 Percent" appeared online, modelled on the "We Are the 99 Percent" Tumblr associated with the Occupy movement, inviting users to submit photographs of themselves with signs explaining why they belonged to the "47 percent".

== Electoral impact ==
Numerous political pundits have partially attributed Obama's re-election to the "47 percent" speech. Nate Silver of FiveThirtyEight tracked the impact of the video on polling in the days following its publication on September 17, 2012. Silver noted that Romney had been trailing Obama in national polls before the video's release and that the video appeared to have compounded existing difficulties for his campaign, though he cautioned at the time that the political impact of gaffes is frequently overstated in the immediate aftermath.

After the video's publication, Gallup released polling showing that Romney's remarks made 36 percent of voters less likely to support him. The same poll found that 20 percent of voters were more likely to support Romney after hearing the speech, while 43 percent said that Romney's remarks won't make a difference. Among respondents earning less than $24,000 per annum, 42 percent were less likely to vote for Romney, compared to only 28 percent of respondents earning over $90,000.

A Pew Research Center poll conducted in late September found that 55 percent of voters who knew of Romney's remarks had a negative reaction to them, while 23 percent reacted positively. Only 17 percent of Republicans reported a negative reaction to Romney's comments, compared to 88 percent of Democrats and 55 percent of registered independents.

Romney went on to lose the November 6, 2012, general election to Barack Obama by 332 to 206 electoral votes and by approximately four percentage points in the national popular vote. In the 2023 biography Romney: A Reckoning, author McKay Coppins wrote that Romney knew his remarks were "stupid" and "posed a threat" to his campaign.

On the one-year anniversary of the video's release, NBC News described it as "quite possibly campaign-killing," noting that it had "immediately changed the trajectory of the race in the heat of the campaign season." In March 2013, Reuters wrote that as a result of the leak, "Romney was put on the defensive for weeks and never really recovered."

== See also ==
- Basket of deplorables
- Binders full of women
