= Philip Perry =

American lawyer (born 1964)

General Counsel of the United States Department of Homeland Security
- In office June 8, 2005 – February 6, 2007
- President: George W. Bush
- Preceded by: Joe D. Whitley
- Succeeded by: Ivan K. Fong

Personal details
- Born: Philip Jonathan Perry; October 16, 1964 (age 62) San Diego, California, U.S.
- Party: Republican
- Spouse: Liz Cheney (m. 1993)
- Relations: Dick Cheney (father-in-law) Lynne Cheney (mother-in-law) Mary Cheney (sister-in-law)
- Children: 5
- Education: Colorado College (BA); Cornell University (JD)

Philip Jonathan Perry (born October 16, 1964) is an American attorney and was a political appointee during the George W. Bush administration, where he was acting associate attorney general at the Department of Justice, general counsel of the Office of Management and Budget, and general counsel of the Department of Homeland Security.

He is a partner at Latham & Watkins in Washington, D.C., and has served as lead counsel on many matters of national importance. He has handled matters before the U.S. Supreme Court, the U.S. Courts of Appeals, and U.S. District Courts across the country. He is known both for his work litigating biotechnology issues and his work on constitutional and federal regulatory matters. He is the husband of former Representative Liz Cheney and the son-in-law of former Vice President Dick Cheney.

== Early life and education ==
Perry was born in San Diego County, California. He grew up in Orinda, California, a San Francisco Bay Area suburb and was a 1982 graduate of Miramonte High School, He graduated with a Bachelor of Arts degree in English from Colorado College in 1986, and obtained a Juris Doctor degree from Cornell Law School in 1990.

== Career ==
In 1997 and 1998, Perry was counsel to the United States Senate hearings on campaign finance abuses in the 1996 presidential campaigns.

In 2000, he was a policy advisor for the Bush-Cheney presidential transition team and an advisor on the vice presidential debate preparation team.

Perry joined the Department of Justice and served in a number of roles before being named acting associate attorney general (the department's third-ranking official), overseeing DOJ's five civil litigating units: Civil, Tax, Environment and Natural Resources, Antitrust, and Civil Rights.

In 2002, Perry became general counsel for the Office of Management and Budget (OMB) under the then-OMB director Mitch Daniels, where he supervised the White House's clearance of federal regulations, mediated interagency disputes, addressed matters on the DOJ's civil litigation docket, formulated presidential executive orders, developed White House policy initiatives, and advised the president. Among his tasks as general counsel was drafting the legislation that created the new Department of Homeland Security. Kenneth Feinberg, special master of the September 11th Victim Compensation Fund, called Perry "a first-rate lawyer," "quiet but determined, " and the "unsung hero" of the team of lawyers faced with settling the issue of which family members of September 11 victims would be eligible to receive compensation. Perry suggested that in cases where family wills did not stipulate beneficiaries (80%), the matter should be determined under the inheritance laws of the state in which a victim held residence.

After several years of federal service, Perry returned to Latham & Watkins as a partner, where he rejoined their litigation and regulatory groups, serving as counsel on behalf of Fortune 500 clients such as Monsanto, defense contractor Lockheed Martin and others. The Washington Post reported that at Latham & Watkins, Perry was "a leader of its homeland security practice."

Perry's law practice has largely involved federal court litigation. He has served as lead trial counsel in important nationally prominent matters. Although he has handled numerous commercial matters, his most high-profile successes have involved federal constitutional issues, government regulation and federal contracts. Over the past 15 years since returning to private practice at Latham, Perry has won dozens of cases, including on many consequential Constitutional and federal and state regulatory issues.

In April 2005, President George Bush nominated Perry to be the general counsel for the Department of Homeland Security. Perry was confirmed unanimously by the U.S. Senate later that year. In his position as the general counsel for the DHS, Perry supervised over 1,500 lawyers, and advised Secretary Michael Chertoff and the White House on the department's legal and policy issues. Issues of influence for Perry included, but were not limited to, "the transit of people and cargo, comprehensive immigration reform, and critical infrastructure such as chemical plants." A Cornell Law alumni newsletter reports, "While at DHS, he was joined by Gus P. Coldebella '94, current acting general counsel, and Julie L. Myers '94, assistant secretary of homeland security for U.S. Immigration and Customs Enforcement."

Perry was involved in the inter-agency Committee on Foreign Investment in the United States (CFIUS) National Security Agreement process.

== Awards and honors ==
In 2008, Perry was recognized as a leading litigator in the Euromoney Institutional Investor Benchmark: Litigation 2008 guide. Perry has also been recognized several times as a BTI Client Service All-Star.

In 2018, Perry was named a "Litigation Trailblazer" by The National Law Journal.

== Personal life ==
Perry is married to Elizabeth Cheney, an alumna of Colorado College. They have five children. Elizabeth Cheney is a daughter of former Vice President Dick Cheney. She is the former deputy assistant secretary of state for near eastern affairs at the State Department, and was a member of the Iran Syria Policy and Operations Group, and was elected to the U.S. House of Representatives from Wyoming's at-large congressional district. Representative Cheney served as the Vice Chair of the United States House Select Committee on the January 6 Attack.
