= American exceptionalism =

Idea of the United States as unique nation

American exceptionalism is the belief that the United States is distinctive, unique, or exemplary compared to other nations. Proponents argue that the values, political system, and historical development of the U.S. are unique in human history, often with the implication that it is both destined and entitled to play a distinct role on the world stage.

The term was coined by German Marxists in the 1920s. Focusing on the abundant natural resources in the United States, it was intended as an explanation for why the United States was not experiencing the level of class conflict that existed in Europe. However, the idea of American exceptionalism dates back much further, to French political scientist and historian Alexis de Tocqueville's observations and writings on the United States, most notably in his comparison of the United States with the United Kingdom and his native France. De Tocqueville wrote about the United States as a uniquely free nation based on personal liberty and democratic ideals.

Seymour Martin Lipset, a prominent American political scientist and sociologist, argues that the United States is exceptional in that it started from a revolutionary event. He therefore traces the origins of American exceptionalism to the American Revolution, from which the U.S. emerged as "the first new nation" with a distinct ideology, and having a unique mission to transform the world. This ideology, which Lipset calls "Americanism" but is often also referred to as "American exceptionalism", is based on liberty, individualism, republicanism, democracy, meritocracy, and laissez-faire economics; these principles are sometimes collectively referred to as "American exceptionalism".

As a term in political science, American exceptionalism refers to the United States' status as a global outlier both in good and bad ways. Critics of the concept say that the idea of American exceptionalism suggests that the U.S. is better than other countries, has a superior culture, or has a unique mission to transform the planet and its inhabitants.

== Terminology ==
The concept of the United States as an exceptional society has a long history, sometimes traced back to French writer Alexis de Tocqueville or to the ideas espoused by the Founding Fathers of the United States during the American Revolution. For example, in August 1861 Economic Daily News of London alluded to "the 'exceptionalism', if one may use the word, on which the Americans rather pride themselves" in a discussion of the American Civil War.

However, the specific term "American exceptionalism" appears to have originated with American communists in the late 1920s. The earliest documented usage cited by the Oxford English Dictionary is from the Daily Worker, January 29, 1929: "This American 'exceptionalism' applies to the whole tactical line of the Communist International as applied to America." In turn, Soviet leader Joseph Stalin (who was likely aware of this earlier use) condemned the "heresy of American exceptionalism" in a tense discussion with Jay Lovestone of the Communist Party USA, after Lovestone echoed the arguments of other American communists that the U.S. is independent of the Marxist laws of history "thanks to its natural resources, industrial capacity, and absence of rigid class distinctions." The term later moved into general use by intellectuals.

The term "American exceptionalism" was rarely used after the 1930s until U.S. newspapers popularized it in the 1980s to describe America's cultural and political uniqueness.

In 1989, Scottish political scientist Richard Rose noted that most American historians endorse exceptionalism, and he suggests their reasoning to be as follows:

America marches to a different drummer. Its uniqueness is explained by any or all of a variety of reasons: history, size, geography, political institutions, and culture. Explanations of the growth of government in Europe are not expected to fit American experience, and vice versa.

However, postnationalist scholars reject American exceptionalism and argue the U.S. did not break from European history and accordingly has retained class-based and race-based differences as well as imperialism and willingness to wage war.

In recent years, scholars from numerous disciplines, as well as politicians and commentators in the traditional media, have debated the meaning and usefulness of the concept. Roberts and DiCuirci ask:

Why has the myth of American exceptionalism, characterized by a belief in America's highly distinctive features or unusual trajectory based on the abundance of its natural resources, its revolutionary origins and its Protestant religious culture that anticipated God's blessing of the nation, held such tremendous staying power, from its influence in popular culture to its critical role in foreign policy?

Some historians support the concept of American exceptionalism but avoid the terminology to avoid getting entangled in rhetorical debates. Bernard Bailyn, a leading colonial specialist at Harvard, was a believer in the distinctiveness of American civilization. Although he rarely, if ever, used the phrase "American exceptionalism," he insisted upon the "distinctive characteristics of British North American life." He argues that the process of social and cultural transmission result in peculiarly-American patterns of education in the broadest sense of the word, and he believed in the unique character of the American Revolution.

The term became an issue of contention between the presidential candidates Barack Obama and John McCain in the 2008 presidential campaign, with McCain criticizing Obama for allegedly disbelieving the concept.

== History of concept ==
=== Alexis de Tocqueville and others (1835) ===
The first reference to the concept by name, and possibly its origin, was by de Tocqueville in his 1835/1840 work Democracy in America:

The position of the Americans is therefore quite exceptional [emphasis added], and it may be believed that no democratic people will ever be placed in a similar one. Their strictly Puritanical origin, their exclusively commercial habits, even the country they inhabit, which seems to focus their minds on the pursuit of science, literature, and the arts, the proximity of Europe, which allows them to sometimes neglect these pursuits without relapsing into barbarism, a thousand special causes, of which I have only been able to point out the most important, have singularly concurred to fix the mind of the American upon purely practical objects. His passions, his wants, his education, and everything about him seem to unite in drawing the natives of the United States earthward; his religion alone bids him turn, from time to time, a transient and distracted glance to heaven. Let us cease, then, to view all democratic nations under the example of the American people.

Historian Michael Kammen says that many foreign writers commented on American exceptionalism including Karl Marx, Francis Lieber, Hermann Eduard von Holst, James Bryce, H. G. Wells, G. K. Chesterton, and Hilaire Belloc and that they did so in complimentary terms. The theme became common, especially in textbooks. From the 1840s to the late 19th century, the McGuffey Readers sold 120 million copies and were studied by most American students. Skrabec (2009) argues the Readers "hailed American exceptionalism, manifest destiny, and America as God's country.... Furthermore, McGuffey saw America as having a future mission to bring liberty and democracy to the world."

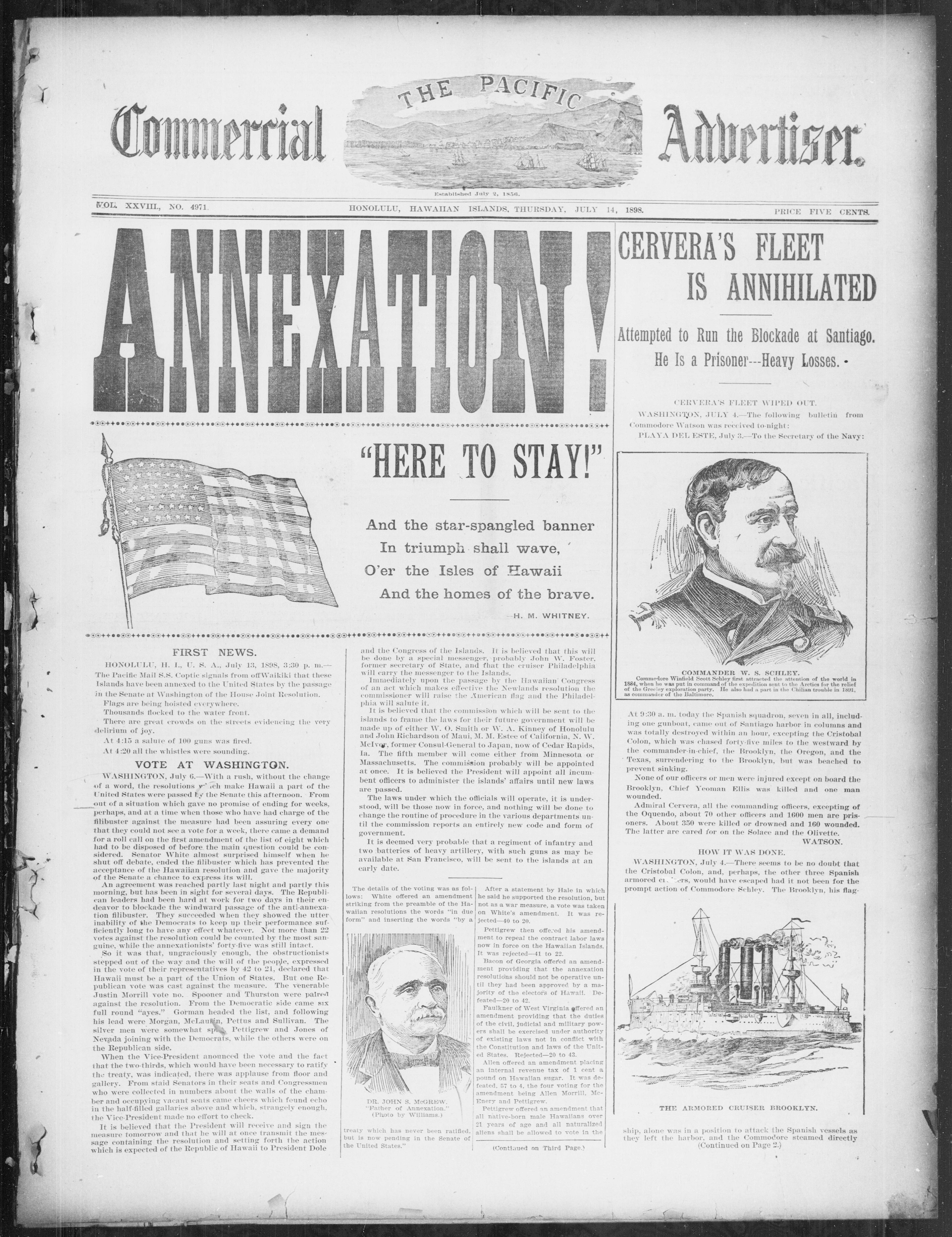
Newspaper reporting the annexation of the Republic of Hawaii in 1898. American exceptionalism has fueled American expansion through the ideology of manifest destiny.

=== Communist debate (1927) ===
In June 1927 Jay Lovestone, a leader of the Communist Party USA, describes America's economic and social uniqueness. He notes the increasing strength of American capitalism and the country's "tremendous reserve power" and says that they both prevented a communist revolution. In mid-1929, Soviet leader Joseph Stalin, disbelieving that America was so resistant to revolution, denounced Lovestone's ideas as "the heresy of American exceptionalism", which was likely a reference to an article published in the Daily Worker earlier that year.

The Great Depression in the United States appeared to underscore Stalin's argument that American capitalism falls under the general laws of Marxism. In June 1930, during the national convention of the Communist Party USA in New York, it was declared: "The storm of the economic crisis in the United States blew down the house of cards of American exceptionalism and the whole system of opportunistic theories and illusions that had been built upon American capitalist 'prosperity'".

=== LDS Church ===
The Church of Jesus Christ of Latter-day Saints (LDS Church) believes that the Americas, including the United States, are a unique place, populated by a chosen people and the Native Americans are, at least in part, composed of Lamanites and Mormons for a singular destiny, linking the United States to the Biblical promised land in the Book of Mormon, with the Constitution of the United States being divinely inspired. Joseph Smith argued that the millennial New Jerusalem was to be built in America (10th Article of Faith) and reported God as saying "it is not right that any man should be in bondage one to another. And for this purpose have I established the Constitution of this land, by the hands of wise men whom I raised up unto this very purpose, and redeemed the land by the shedding of blood" (D&C 101:79–80).

Although officially shunned by the LDS Church, fundamentalist Mormons believe in the White Horse Prophecy, which argues that Mormons will be the ones called upon to preserve the Constitution as it hangs "by a thread".

=== Uniqueness ===
In general, Americans have had the consideration of national "uniqueness." Historian Dorothy Ross points to three different currents regarding unique characteristics.

1. Some Protestants believed American progress would facilitate the return of Jesus Christ and the Christian Millennium.
2. Some 19th-century historians linked American liberty to the development of liberty in Anglo-Saxon England.
3. Other American writers looked to the "millennial newness" of America. Henry Nash Smith stressed the theme of "virgin land" in the American frontier that promised an escape from the decay that had befallen earlier republics.

=== Obama administration and later ===
In April 2009, U.S. President Barack Obama responded to a journalist's question in Strasbourg with this statement: "I believe in American exceptionalism, just as I suspect that the Brits believe in British exceptionalism and the Greeks believe in Greek exceptionalism." Obama further noted, "I see no contradiction between believing that America has a continued extraordinary role in leading the world towards peace and prosperity and recognizing that leadership is incumbent, depends on, our ability to create partnerships because we can't solve these problems alone."

Mitt Romney attacked Obama's statement and argued it showed Obama did not believe in American exceptionalism. Arkansas Governor Mike Huckabee said that Obama's "worldview is dramatically different from any president, Republican or Democrat, we've had... He grew up more as a globalist than an American. To deny American exceptionalism is in essence to deny the heart and soul of this nation."

In a speech on the Syrian civil war on September 10, 2013, Obama said that "however, when, with modest effort and risk, we can stop children from being gassed to death, and thereby make our kids safer over the long run, I believe we should act.... That is what makes America different. That is what makes us exceptional." In a direct response the next day, Russian President Vladimir Putin published an op-ed in The New York Times, articulating, "It is extremely dangerous to encourage people to see themselves as exceptional, whatever the motivation.... We are all different, but when we ask for the Lord's blessings, we must not forget that God created us equal." Putin's views were soon endorsed by Donald Trump, who declared the op-ed "a masterpiece." "You think of the term as being beautiful, but all of sudden you say, what if you're in Germany or Japan or any one of 100 countries? You are not going to like that term," Trump said. "It is very insulting, and Putin put it to him about that."

Some left-wing American commentators agree with Trump's stance; one example is Sherle Schwenninger, a co-founder of the New America Foundation, who in a 2016 Nation magazine symposium remarked, "Trump would redefine American exceptionalism by bringing an end to the neoliberal/neoconservative globalist project that Hillary Clinton and many Republicans support." However, Trump has also advocated an "America First" policy, emphasizing American nationalism and unilateralism, though with a greater emphasis on non-interventionism. And in his 2025 inauguration speech, Trump stated "America will soon be greater, stronger, and far more exceptional than ever before."

American exceptionalism has been a plank of the Republican party platform since 2012. The platform adopted in 2016 defines it as "the notion that our ideas and principles as a nation give us a unique place of moral leadership" and affirms that the U.S. therefore must "retake its natural position as leader of the free world." The term was adopted by former U.S. Vice President Dick Cheney in his 2015 book Exceptional: Why the World Needs a Powerful America.

== Causes in historical context ==
Scholars have explored possible justifications for the notion of American exceptionalism.

=== Absence of feudalism ===
Many scholars use a model of American exceptionalism developed by Harvard political scientist Louis Hartz. In The Liberal Tradition in America (1955), Hartz argues that the American political tradition lacks the left-wing/socialist and right-wing/aristocratic elements that dominated in Europe because colonial America lacked feudal traditions, such as established churches, landed estates, and a hereditary nobility. As a result, American politics developed around a tradition of 'Lockean' liberalism. Although some European practices of feudal origin, such as primogeniture, were transmitted to America, Hartz argues that their abolition during the American Revolution only confirmed the liberalism of the United States.

The "liberal consensus" school, typified by David Potter, Daniel Boorstin, and Richard Hofstadter follows Hartz in emphasizing that political conflicts in American history remained within the tight boundaries of this liberal tradition, especially regarding private property, individual rights, and representative government. The national government that emerged was far less centralized or nationalized than its European counterparts.

Some scholars, however, have disputed whether feudalism was absent from America. Sheldon Wolin has argued that the American Revolution was a reaction against increased centralization by the British government, while Karen Orren has claimed that aspects of feudal employment law lasted in America as late as the 1930s. James T. Kloppenberg has criticized Hartz for viewing American politics as a liberal consensus, arguing that this oversimplifies U.S. history. On the other hand, Catherine A. Holland, while accepting other criticisms of Hartz, has argued that this is a misinterpretation, and that Hartz acknowledged divisions within American politics (albeit divisions within liberalism).

=== Legacy of slavery ===
Although slavery was historically practiced within European territories during antiquity and the pre-modern era, the United States was unique among modern Western nations in maintaining a massive institution of chattel slavery within its contiguous borders during the rise of the industrial labor movement. While European empires of the 19th century largely kept their enslaved populations geographically separated in overseas colonies, the United States underwent emancipation and the formation of modern class politics within the same geographic space.

This domestic legacy fractured the American working class along racial lines. Whereas labor movements elsewhere often forged a unified sense of class solidarity, America's workforce became divided into two tiers with competing political priorities. Many white workers came to view social policies—such as welfare—not as collective gains, but as benefits to Black Americans at whites' expense. Consequently, redistribution was increasingly seen not as a transfer of wealth between social classes, but as a racial transfer—one that shifted resources from whites to Black communities. This anxiety over status and resources drove much of the white working class toward conservative, anti-socialist ideologies that promised to safeguard their position. In turn, these racial divisions weakened the foundation for robust left-wing movements and prevented the emergence of strong socialist or labor parties in the United States.

=== Puritan roots and Protestant promise ===
Parts of American exceptionalism can be traced to American Puritan roots. Many Puritans with Arminian leanings embraced a middle ground between strict Calvinist predestination and a less restricting theology of divine providence. They believed that God had made a covenant with their people and had chosen them to provide a model for the other nations of the Earth. Puritan John Winthrop metaphorically expressed this idea as a "City upon a Hill: the Puritan community of New England should serve as a model for the rest of the world. That metaphor is often used by proponents of exceptionalism.

The Puritans' moralistic values have remained a component of the national identity for centuries. Eric Luis Uhlmann of Northwestern University argues that Puritan values were eventually taken up by all other Americans. Kevin M. Schultz underlines how they helped America to keep to its Protestant Promise, especially Catholics and Jews.

=== American Revolution and republicanism ===
The ideas that created the American Revolution were derived from a tradition of republicanism that had been repudiated by the British mainstream. Historian Gordon S. Wood has argued, "Our beliefs in liberty, equality, constitutionalism, and the well-being of ordinary people came out of the Revolutionary era. So too did our idea that we Americans are a special people with a special destiny to lead the world toward liberty and democracy." Wood notes that the term is "presently much-maligned" although it is vigorously supported by others such as historian Jon Butler.

Thomas Paine's Common Sense for the first time expressed the belief that America was not just an extension of Europe but a new land and a country of nearly unlimited potential and opportunity that had outgrown the British mother country. Those sentiments laid the intellectual foundations for the revolutionary concept of American exceptionalism and were closely tied to republicanism, the belief that sovereignty belonged to the people, not a hereditary ruling class.

Religious freedom characterized the American Revolution in unique ways when most major nations had state religions. Thomas Jefferson and James Madison created modern constitutional republicanism, which limits ecclesiastical powers. Historian Thomas Kidd (2010) argues, "With the onset of the revolutionary crisis, a significant conceptual shift convinced Americans across the theological spectrum that God was raising America for some particular purpose." Kidd further argues "a new blend of Christian and republican ideology led religious traditionalists to embrace wholesale the concept of republican virtue."

=== Jefferson and the Empire of Liberty ===
According to Tucker and Hendrickson (1992), Jefferson believed America "was the bearer of a new diplomacy, founded on the confidence of a free and virtuous people, that would secure ends based on the natural and universal rights of man, by means that escaped war and its corruptions." Jefferson sought a radical break from the traditional European emphasis on "reason of state," which could justify any action, and the usual priority of foreign policy and the needs of the ruling family over those of the people.

Jefferson envisaged America becoming the world's great "Empire of Liberty," the model for democracy and republicanism. He identified his nation as a beacon to the world, as he said when he departed the presidency in 1809: "Trusted with the destinies of this solitary republic of the world, the only monument of human rights, and the sole depository of the sacred fire of freedom and self-government, from hence it is to be lighted up in other regions of the earth, if other areas of the earth shall ever become susceptible of its benign influence."

== Basis of arguments ==
Marilyn B. Young argues that after the end of the Cold War in 1991, neoconservative intellectuals and policymakers embraced the idea of an "American empire," a national mission to establish freedom and democracy in other nations, particularly poor ones. She argues that after the September 11, 2001, terrorist attacks, the George W. Bush administration reoriented foreign policy to an insistence on maintaining the supreme military and economic power of America, an attitude that harmonized with the new vision of American empire. Young says the Iraq War (2003–2011) exemplified American exceptionalism.

In 2012, conservative historians Larry Schweikart and Dave Dougherty based American exceptionalism on four pillars: (1) common law; (2) virtue and morality located in Protestant Christianity; (3) free-market capitalism; and (4) the sanctity of private property.

In his 2015 book, Exceptional: Why the World Needs a Powerful America, Dick Cheney sets out and argues the case for American exceptionalism and concludes: "we are, as Lincoln said, 'the last, best hope of earth.' We are not just one more nation, one more same entity on the world stage. We have been essential to the preservation and progress of freedom, and those who lead us in the years ahead must remind us, as Roosevelt, Kennedy, and Reagan did, of the unique role we play. Neither they nor we should ever forget that we are, in fact, exceptional."

=== Republican ethos and ideas about nationhood ===
Proponents of American exceptionalism argue that the United States is exceptional in that it was founded on a set of republican ideals rather than on a common heritage, ethnicity, or ruling elite. In the formulation of President Abraham Lincoln in his Gettysburg Address, America is a nation "conceived in liberty, and dedicated to the proposition that all men are created equal." In Lincoln's interpretation, America is inextricably connected with freedom and equality, and the American mission is to ensure "that government of the people, by the people, for the people, shall not perish from the earth." Historian T. Harry Williams argues that Lincoln believed:

In the United States man would create a society that would be the best and the happiest in the world. The United States was the supreme demonstration of democracy. However, the Union did not exist just to make men free in America. It had an even greater mission—to make them free everywhere. By the mere force of its example, America would bring democracy to an undemocratic world.

American policies have been characterized since their inception by a system of federalism (between the states and the federal government) and checks and balances (among the legislative, executive, and judicial branches), which were designed to prevent any faction, region, or government organ from becoming too powerful. Some proponents argue that the system and the accompanying distrust of concentrated power prevent the United States from suffering a "tyranny of the majority," preserve a free republican democracy, and allow citizens to live in a locality whose laws reflect those voters' values.

A consequence of the political system is that laws can vary widely across the country. Critics maintain that the system merely replaces the power of the federal majority over states with power by the states over local entities. On the balance, the American political system arguably allows for more local dominance but prevents more domestic dominance than a more unitary system would.

Historian Eric Foner has explored the question of birthright citizenship, the provision of the Fourteenth Amendment (1868) that makes anyone born in the United States a full citizen. He argues that:

birthright citizenship stands as an example of the much-abused idea of American exceptionalism... birthright citizenship does make the United States (along with Canada) unique in the developed world. No European nation recognizes the principle.

=== Global leadership and activism ===
Yale Law School Dean Harold Hongju Koh has identified what he says is "the most important respect in which the United States has been genuinely exceptional, about international affairs, international law, and promotion of human rights: namely, in its outstanding global leadership and activism." He argues:

To this day, the United States remains the only superpower capable, and at times willing, to commit real resources and make real sacrifices to build, sustain, and drive an international system committed to international law, democracy, and the promotion of human rights. Experience teaches that when the United States leads on human rights, from Nuremberg to Kosovo, other countries follow.

Peggy Noonan, an American political pundit, wrote in The Wall Street Journal "America is not exceptional because it has long attempted to be a force for good in the world, it tries to be a force for good because it is exceptional." Cheney explores the concept of United States global leadership in his 2015 book.

=== Frontier spirit ===
Proponents of American exceptionalism often claim that many features of the "American spirit" were shaped by the frontier experience. In line with historian Frederick Jackson Turner's influential Frontier Thesis, they argue that the American frontier allowed individualism to flourish as pioneers adopted democracy and social equality, and shed centuries-old European institutions such as royalty, standing armies, established churches, and a landed aristocracy that owned most of the land.

However, the frontier experience was not entirely unique to the United States. Other nations also had frontiers but were not shaped by them nearly as much as America was by its frontier, usually because they were under the control of a strong national government. South Africa, Russia, Brazil, Argentina, Canada, and Australia all had long frontiers, but they did not have "free land" and local control. The political and cultural environments were much different since these other frontiers neither involved widespread ownership of free land nor allowed the settlers to control the local and provincial governments, as was the case in America. Consequently, their frontiers did not shape their national psyches. Each of these nations had entirely different frontier experiences. For example, the Boers in South Africa were defeated in war by Britain. In Australia, "mateship" and working together were valued more than individualism was in the United States.

=== Mobility and welfare ===
For most of its history, especially from the mid-19th to the early-20th centuries, the United States has been known as the "land of opportunity" and in that sense prided and promoted itself on providing individuals with the opportunity to escape from the contexts of their class and family background. Examples of that social mobility include:

- Occupational: children could easily choose careers that were not based upon their parents' choices.
- Physical: geographical location was not seen as static, and citizens often relocated freely over long distances without a barrier.
- Status: as in most countries, family standing and riches were often a means to remain in a higher social circle. America was notably unusual because of an accepted wisdom that anyone, from poor immigrants upwards, who worked hard could aspire to similar standing, regardless of circumstances of birth. That aspiration is commonly called living the American dream. Birth details were not taken as a social barrier to the upper echelons or high political status in American culture. That stood in contrast to other countries in which many larger offices were socially determined and usually difficult to enter unless one was born into the suitable social group.

However, social mobility in the U.S. is lower than in some European Union countries if it is defined by income movements. American men born into the lowest income quintile are much more likely to stay there than similar people in the Nordic countries or the United Kingdom. Many economists, such as Harvard economist N. Gregory Mankiw, state that the discrepancy has little to do with class rigidity; rather, it is a reflection of income disparity: "Moving up and down a short ladder is a lot easier than moving up and down a tall one." Recent evidence using more complete non-anonymous datasets shows the U.S. to be among the highest of developed nations in intragenerational income mobility, the change in social position that occurs within someone's life. Similar findings have been made regarding occupational mobility in which over time in the U.S. there has been an increase in within lifetime occupational mobility for both men and women across the majority of occupations.

Regarding public welfare, political scientist Richard Rose asked in 1989 if the evidence shows the U.S. "is becoming more like other mixed-economy welfare states, or increasingly exceptional." He concludes, "By comparison with other advanced industrial nations America is today exceptional in total public expenditure, in major program priorities, and in the value of public benefits."

=== African American Exceptionalism ===
A corollary of American exceptionalism holds that African Americans are exceptional within the African diaspora and the entire world. The intrinsic injustice, moral wrong, and oppression of U.S. slavery would seem to exclude African Americans from the concept. Comparisons to other slave systems in the Caribbean, South America, Arabia, and the entire Islamic world document on a statistical basis that the U.S. slave population increased in size, and is the only slave population in history shown to have increased in numbers. Only 3.63% of Africans brought across the Atlantic Ocean as slaves were brought to what is now the United States.

After abolition of the Atlantic slave trade on January 1, 1808, the first date allowed by the U.S. Constitution's 20-year allowance, some argue that the treatment of U.S. slaves improved. Most other slave systems, including those based primarily on sugar, were in the unhealthier tropics, which encouraged continual importation of slaves from Africa and unbalanced sex ratios. The U.S. slave population lived in a temperate climate, on lands with the best soil. By 1860, about half of the slave population in the New World lived in the U.S.

African Americans overcame numerous obstacles to their advancement and continue to struggle against past bondage and discrimination. The first statement of African American exceptionalism was made by Booker T. Washington in 1901:

"The ten million Negroes inhabiting this country, who themselves or whose ancestors went through the school of American slavery, are in a stronger and more hopeful condition, materially, intellectually, morally, and religiously, than is true of an equal number of black people in any other portion of the globe."

As of 2024, African Americans are among the wealthiest, best educated, most accomplished, and most famous African-descended people in the world, just as Washington observed in 1901, which leads some scholars to affirm that African Americans are at the pinnacle of the worldwide African diaspora. They are "embedded in the very cultural and economic hegemony of the United States." African Americans benefitted from the rule of law in the U.S. This benefit before 1865 was indirect and extractive, but thereafter, starting with the 13th, 14th, and 15th Amendments, the U.S. rose to prominence as the world's preeminent superpower through the inclusive rule of law. The concept differs from what some call "Black exceptionalism," the emphasis on exceptional Black people, such as during Black History Month.

== Criticism ==
Historian Michael Kammen argues that criticisms of the notion were raised in the 1970s in the wake of the Vietnam War. According to Kammen, many intellectuals then decided, "The American Adam had lost his innocence and given way to a helpless, tarnished Gulliver."

At about the same time, the new social history used statistical techniques on population samples that seemed to show resemblances with Europe on issues such as social mobility. By the 1980s, labor historians were emphasizing that the failure of a workers' party to emerge in the United States meant that America was not exceptionally favorable for workers. By the late 1980s, other academic critics started mocking the extreme chauvinism displayed by the modern usage of exceptionalism. Finally, in the mid-1980s, colonial historians debated the uniqueness of the American experience in the context of British history. On the other hand, Wilentz argues for "distinctively American forms of class conflict," and Foner states there was a "distinctive character of American trade unionism."

The third idea of American exceptionalism, superiority, has been criticized with charges of moral defectiveness and the existence of double standards. In American Exceptionalism and Human Rights (2005), Michael Ignatieff treats the idea negatively and identifies three main sub-types: "exemptionalism" (supporting treaties as long as U.S. citizens are exempt from them); "double standards" (criticizing "others for not heeding the findings of international human rights bodies but ignoring what the organizations say of the United States"), and "legal isolationism" (the tendency of U.S. judges to ignore other jurisdictions).

=== Exceptionalism as "exemptionalism" ===
During the George W. Bush administration (2001–2009), the term was somewhat abstracted from its historical context. Proponents and opponents alike began using it to describe a phenomenon wherein certain political interests view the United States as being "above" or an "exception" to the law, specifically the law of nations. (That phenomenon is less concerned with justifying American uniqueness than with asserting its immunity to international law.) Critics argue that American exceptionalism was increasingly used to justify foreign policy decisions that placed the United States "above international law." This perspective claims that the U.S. invoked exceptionalism not as a model of global leadership but as a rationale for unilateralism and selective application of legal norms.

The new use of the term has served to confuse the topic and muddy the waters since its unilateralist emphasis and the actual orientation diverge somewhat from prior uses of the phrase. A certain number of those who subscribe to "old-style" or "traditional American exceptionalism," the idea that America is a more nearly exceptional nation than are others and that it differs qualitatively from the rest of the world and has a unique role to play in world history, also agree that the United States is and ought to be entirely subject to and bound by public international law. Indeed, recent research shows "there is some indication for American exceptionalism among the [U.S.] public, but very little evidence of unilateral attitudes."

=== Moral purity ===
Critics such as Marilyn Young and Howard Zinn have argued that American history is so morally flawed because of slavery, civil rights, and social welfare issues that it cannot be an exemplar of virtue. Zinn argues that American exceptionalism cannot be of divine origin because it was not benign, especially in dealing with Native Americans. Deborah Madsen cites Frederick Douglass, a prominent black abolitionist before and during the American Civil War (1861–1865), who argued that the idea of American exceptionalism was absurd because the inherent nature of slavery still existed at the time.

Donald E. Pease mocks American exceptionalism as a "state fantasy" and a "myth" in his 2009 book The New American Exceptionalism. Pease notes that state fantasies cannot altogether conceal the inconsistencies they mask, showing how such events as the revelations of prisoner abuse at Abu Ghraib prison and the exposure of government incompetence after Hurricane Katrina opened fissures in the myth of exceptionalism.

Theologian Reinhold Niebuhr argues that the automatic assumption that America acts for the right will bring about moral corruption, although Niebuhr supported America's Cold War policies. His position, "Christian realism," advocates a liberal notion of responsibility that justified interference in other nations. Historian Jon Meacham points out examples of leaders that have made both good and bad moral choices, in some cases one person changing a position for better or worse, and in other cases rectifying bad choices made by a predecessor.

=== Double standards ===
U.S. historians like Thomas Bender "try and put an end to the recent revival of American exceptionalism, a defect he esteems to be inherited from the Cold War." Gary W. Reichard and Ted Dickson argue "how the development of the United States has always depended on its transactions with other nations for commodities, cultural values and populations." Roger Cohen asks, "How exceptional can you be when every major problem you face, from terrorism to nuclear proliferation to gas prices, requires joint action?" Harold Koh distinguishes "distinctive rights, different labels, the 'flying buttress' mentality, and double standards. (...) [T]he fourth face—double standards—presents the most dangerous and destructive form of American exceptionalism." Godfrey Hodgson also concludes that "the U.S. national myth is dangerous". Samantha Power asserts that "we're neither the shining example, nor even competent meddlers. It's going to take a generation or so to reclaim American exceptionalism." Some scholars and commentators argue that American exceptionalism promotes a system of double standards. The U.S. is perceived to reserve for itself a set of rights and privileges that it denies to other nations, often citing moral or historical uniqueness. Bender has argued that such a worldview undermines America's ability to integrate itself into a multipolar world and contributes to a distorted self-perception.

=== Inconsistent support for democracy ===
After the abolition of slavery, the federal government ignored the requirements of the Equal Protection Clause with respect to African-Americans during the Jim Crow era, and with respect to women's suffrage until the Nineteenth Amendment to the United States Constitution in 1920. Though the Guarantee Clause gives Congress the responsibility to ensure a republican form of government in the states, successful white supremacist coups in local governments were tolerated in the Election Massacre of 1874 and Wilmington massacre. (Many other coup attempts were successfully suppressed.)

The United States military, diplomats, intelligence agencies, and foreign aid have been used to protect democratic regimes in many countries, including many Allies of World War II, First World democracies during the Cold War, and Israel. In its regime change activities, it has also brought democracy to many countries, sometimes by force. These include the governments and protectorates created in areas defeated in World War I, World War II, and the Iraq War. The United States has also supported the overthrow of democratically elected governments in pursuit of other objectives, typically economic and anti-communist. These include the 1913 Mexican coup (against the orders of the president; see United States involvement in the Mexican Revolution), the 1941 coup deposing Arnulfo Arias to secure the Panama Canal, the 1953 Iranian coup d'état, the 1954 Guatemalan coup d'état, the 1960 overthrow of Patrice Lumumba in the Democratic Republic of Congo, and the 1964 Brazilian coup d'état. The United States reversed its previous support for a military junta and restored democracy to Haiti with Operation Uphold Democracy in 1994–95.

=== Americanist heresy ===
In 1898, Pope Leo XIII denounced what he deemed to be the heresy of Americanism in his encyclical Testem benevolentiae. He targets American exceptionalism in the ecclesiastical domain and argues that it stands in opposition to papal denunciations of modernism. In the late 19th century, there was a tendency for U.S. Catholic clergy to view American society as inherently different from other Christian nations and to argue that the understanding of Church doctrine had to be enlarged in order to encompass the "American experience," which included greater individualism, tolerance of other religions, and separation of church and state.

=== Pre-emptive declinism ===
Herbert London defines pre-emptive declinism as a postmodern belief "that the United States is not an exceptional nation and is not entitled by virtue of history to play a role on the world stage different from other nations". London ascribes that view to Paul Krugman and others. Krugman had written in The New York Times, "We have always known that America's reign as the world's greatest nation would eventually end. However, most of us imagined that our downfall, when it came, would be something grand and tragic."

According to RealClearPolitics, declarations of America's declining power have been common in the English-language media. In 1988, Flora Lewis said, "Talk of U.S. decline is real in the sense that the U.S. can no longer pull all the levers of command or pay all the bills." According to Anthony Lewis in 1990, Europeans and Asians are already finding confirmation of their suspicion that the United States is in decline. Citing America's dependence on foreign sources of energy and "crucial weaknesses" in the military, Tom Wicker concludes "that maintaining superpower status is becoming more difficult—nearly impossible—for the United States." Patrick Buchanan laments "the decline and fall of the greatest industrial republic the world had ever seen." In 2007, Matthew Parris of The Sunday Times wrote that the United States is "overstretched," and he romantically recalls the Kennedy presidency, when "America had the best arguments" and could use moral persuasion, rather than force, to have its way in the world. From his vantage point in Shanghai, the International Herald Tribune's Howard French worries about "the declining moral influence of the United States" over an emergent China. In his book The Post-American World, Newsweek editor Fareed Zakaria refers to a "Post-American world" that he says "is not about the decline of America, but rather about the rise of everyone else."

=== Similarities between the U.S. and Europe ===
In December 2009, historian Peter Baldwin published a book arguing that despite widespread attempts to contrast the "American way of life" and the "European social model," America and Europe are actually very similar in a number of social and economic indices. Baldwin claims that the black underclass accounts for many of the few areas in which a stark difference exists between the U.S. and Europe, such as homicide and child poverty.

Historian Felipe Fernández-Armesto argues that it be commonly thought that all people consider themselves exceptional. In most cases in which the subject has been broached, the similarities between the conflicting parties outweigh the differences. Things such as the "dynamic wealth creation, the democracy, the accessibility of opportunity, the cult of civil liberty, the tradition of tolerance," and what Fernández-Armesto considers evils such as the materialistic economy, the excessive privileges of wealth, and the selective illiberality are standard features in many modern societies. However, he adds, America is made exceptional by the intensity with which those characteristics are concentrated there.

== Effects ==
Critics argue that it has led to some of the expansion that is seen during the 18th and 19th centuries in the Americas. Deborah Madsen argues that the effects of American exceptionalism have changed over time, from the annexation of Native American lands then to the ideas of Manifest destiny (which encompassed the Mexican–American War and the purchases of land in the 19th century).

Critics have argued that the bipartisan political class believes that one purpose of the United States is to spread democracy to nations that are under tyrannical governments. This can be seen in the contemporary 2001 invasion of Afghanistan and the 2003 invasion of Iraq. Political scientist Joseph Nye has warned that the overuse of exceptionalist rhetoric may weaken the United States' soft power—its ability to influence others through attraction rather than coercion. He suggests that when America presents itself as morally infallible, it risks alienating allies and diminishing its credibility on the world stage.

== See also ==
- Global arrogance – Colloquial term describing hegemony of the USA
- Afrocentrism – African ethnocentrism
- American civil religion – Sociological theory
- American imperialism – Expansion of American political, economic, and military influence
- Americanism (ideology) – Patriotic ideology in the United States
- Americanization – Global influence of US culture
- Americentrism – Idea that US culture is most important
- American nationalism
- Anti-Americanism – Dislike of the United States and Americans
- Anti-Western sentiment – Hatred or opposition towards the Western world or its people
- Chinese exceptionalism – View of China's developmental model
- Ethnocentrism – Judging another culture by the values and standards of one's own culture
- Eurocentrism – Worldview centred on or biased towards Western civilization
- International rankings of the United States
- Mongrel complex – Inferiority complex among Brazilians regarding their nation
- Moral equivalence – Term used in political debates
- Juche – State ideology of North Korea (nationalist ideology of North Korea)
- Sonderweg – Theory in German historiography (the theory which states that German National History underwent an exceptional development)
- Yamato-damashii – Cultural concept for shared values of the Japanese people
- Nihonjinron – Literary genre on Japanese identity
- Russian Idea – Political and religious concept on Russian identity
