= Oath and Honor =

2023 memoir by Liz Cheney

Oath and Honor: A Memoir and a Warning
- Authors: Liz Cheney
- Language: English
- Genre: Autobiography
- Publisher: Little, Brown and Company
- Publication date: December 5, 2023
- Pages: 384
- ISBN: 978-0-316-57206-4

Oath and Honor: A Memoir and a Warning is a memoir written by Liz Cheney, a former United States House representative from Wyoming and Vice Chair of the House Select Committee on the January 6th Attack on the US Capitol. In this memoir, Cheney provided an insider account from her time in the Republican Party before and after the attack at the US Capitol on January 6, 2021, and discusses the possible resurgence of threats to American democracy led by sympathizers of the 45th (and later on, 47th) President of the United States Donald Trump.

An audiobook version of the memoir was also released simultaneously and was read by Cheney herself.

== Reception ==
Writing for the Los Angeles Times, Julia M. Klein described the book as "a mostly straightforward, occasionally repetitive, literarily undistinguished account of that investigation as well as its antecedents and aftermath," and "oozes contempt toward [her] former colleagues, whom she calls 'enablers and collaborators.'" On the contrary, Klein also described the book as lacking "being a classic memoir", and its tone "rarely veers beyond strident anger and self-righteousness, however well-earned."

Sam Tanenhaus of The Washington Post described Cheney's writing as "a prosecutor’s orderly, meticulous mind," and added that the book's subtitle "A Memoir and a Warning" as "an accurate description of the two potential books she has neatly fused into one readable whole."

== See also ==
- Romney: A Reckoning
