= Liz Cheney =

American lawyer and politician (born 1966)

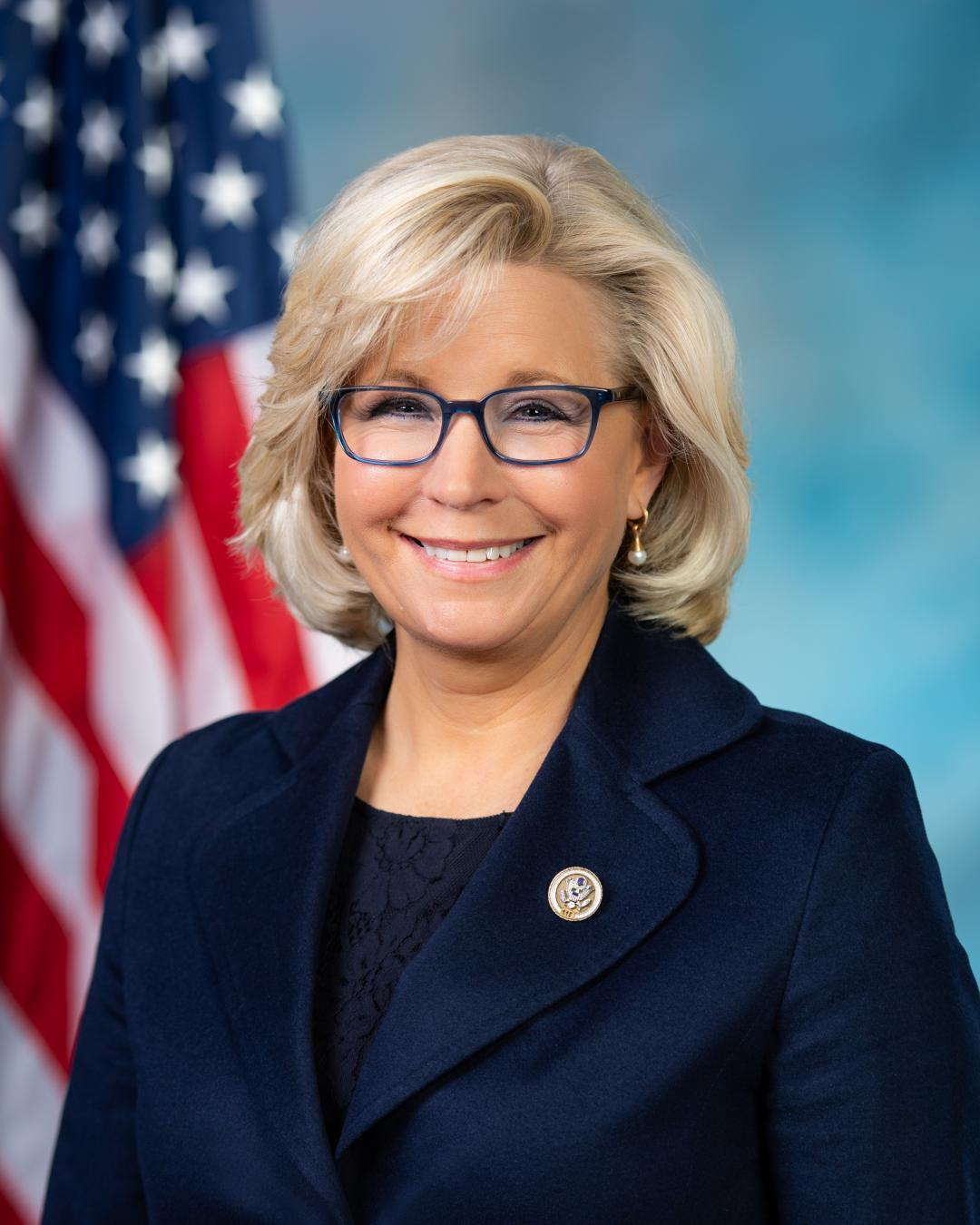
- Official portrait, 2018

Member of the U.S. House of Representatives from Wyoming's at-large district
- In office January 3, 2017 – January 3, 2023
- Preceded by: Cynthia Lummis
- Succeeded by: Harriet Hageman

Chair of the House Republican Conference
- In office January 3, 2019 – May 12, 2021
- Leader: Kevin McCarthy
- Deputy: Mark Walker; Mike Johnson
- Preceded by: Cathy McMorris Rodgers
- Succeeded by: Elise Stefanik

Vice Chair of the House January 6 Committee
- In office September 2, 2021 – January 3, 2023
- Chair: Bennie Thompson
- Preceded by: Position established
- Succeeded by: Position abolished

Personal details
- Born: Elizabeth Lynne Cheney; July 28, 1966 (age 60) Madison, Wisconsin, U.S.
- Party: Republican
- Spouse: Philip Perry (m. 1993)
- Children: 5
- Parents: Dick Cheney; Lynne Vincent
- Relatives: Mary Cheney (sister)
- Education: Colorado College (BA); University of Chicago (JD)
- Occupation: Attorney; politician
- Awards: Presidential Citizens Medal (2025)
- Cheney's voice Cheney on the COVID-19 pandemic Recorded March 27, 2020

Elizabeth Lynne Cheney (/ˈtʃeɪni/; born July 28, 1966) is an American attorney and former politician who was the U.S. representative for Wyoming's at-large congressional district from 2017 to 2023, and served as chair of the House Republican Conference from 2019 to 2021. A member of the Republican Party, she is known for her vocal opposition to Donald Trump.

Cheney is the elder daughter of former vice president Dick Cheney and second lady Lynne Cheney. She held several positions in the U.S. State Department during the George W. Bush administration. She promoted regime change in Iran while chairing the Iran Syria Policy and Operations Group with Elliott Abrams. In 2009, Cheney and Bill Kristol founded Keep America Safe, a nonprofit organization concerned with national security issues that supported the Bush–Cheney administration's positions. In 2014 she was briefly a candidate for the U.S. Senate in Wyoming, challenging incumbent Mike Enzi before withdrawing. She was elected to the House of Representatives in 2016, holding the same seat her father had held from 1979 to 1989.

Regarded as a leading ideological neoconservative in the Bush–Cheney tradition as well as representative of the Republican establishment, Cheney is known for her pro-business stances and hawkish foreign policy views. She was critical of the foreign policy of the first Donald Trump administration while consistently voting in favor of Trump's overall agenda.

Cheney supported the second impeachment of Donald Trump following the 2021 storming of the U.S. Capitol. Her impeachment vote and criticism of Donald Trump led to her eventual removal from Republican leadership in May 2021. In July 2021, Speaker Nancy Pelosi appointed Cheney to the House Select Committee on the January 6 Attack. Two months later, she was made vice chair of the committee. Her role on the committee resulted in the Wyoming Republican Party revoking Cheney's membership in November 2021 as well as censure from the Republican National Committee in February 2022.

In 2022, Cheney lost renomination in Wyoming's Republican primary to Trump-endorsed Harriet Hageman in a landslide, garnering just 28.9% of the vote. Cheney has said that she intends to be "the leader, one of the leaders, in a fight to help to restore" the Republican Party. She later endorsed and campaigned for Kamala Harris's unsuccessful run in the 2024 presidential election. In 2024, she was awarded the Presidential Citizens Medal by Joe Biden and pardoned from potential future prosecution. As of March 2023, she is a professor of practice at the University of Virginia Center for Politics.

== Early life and education ==
Elizabeth Lynne Cheney was born on July 28, 1966, in Madison, Wisconsin. She is the elder of two daughters of former vice president Dick Cheney and former second lady Lynne Cheney (née Vincent). At the time of her birth, her parents were studying at the University of Wisconsin–Madison. Her younger sister, Mary Cheney, was also born in Madison. Cheney attended part of sixth and seventh grade in Casper, Wyoming, while her father campaigned for Congress. The family divided its time between Casper and Washington, D.C., in the 1970s through the 1980s, following her father's election to Congress.

In 1984 Cheney graduated from McLean High School in suburban Washington, D.C., where she was a cheerleader. In 1988, Cheney received her B.A. in political science in from Colorado College, her mother's alma mater, where she wrote a senior thesis entitled "The Evolution of Presidential War Powers." She received her J.D. degree from the University of Chicago Law School in 1996. While there, she also took courses in Middle Eastern history at the Oriental Institute.

== Early career ==
Before attending law school, Cheney worked for the State Department for five years and the United States Agency for International Development between 1989 and 1993. After 1993, she took a job at Armitage Associates LLP, the consulting firm founded by Richard Armitage, then a former Defense Department official and later the deputy secretary of state.

After graduation from law school, Cheney practiced law at the law firm of White & Case and as an international law attorney and consultant at the International Finance Corporation, a member of the World Bank Group. She was also special assistant to the deputy secretary of state for assistance to the former Soviet Union, and a USAID officer in U.S. embassies in Budapest and Warsaw.

== State Department ==
=== Deputy assistant secretary of state for Near Eastern affairs ===
In 2002, Cheney was appointed deputy assistant secretary of state for Near Eastern affairs, a preexisting vacant post with an "economic portfolio", a mandate to promote investment in the region. Amid reports, including a New York Times op-ed piece by Paul Krugman, that the job was created especially for her, State Department spokesman Richard Boucher said that she had come recommended by then-Secretary of State Colin Powell. The Sunday Times reported that Cheney's appointment was "the most intriguing sign that America is getting serious about Middle East reform" and "a measure of the seriousness with which the administration was taking Middle East programmes for literacy, education, and reform."

The appointment followed publicized policy divisions between the vice president's office and the State Department on Middle East policy. In that position, she was given control of the Middle East Partnership Initiative, designed to "foster increased democracy and economic progress in a troubled region". The program spent $29 million in 2002, increased to $129 million in the following year. Cheney's task was to channel money to prescreened groups, some of which were not identified publicly for fear of retaliations from extant governments they sought to undermine. For the budget year 2004, the project sought $145 million.

=== 2004 Bush–Cheney reelection campaign ===
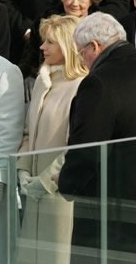
Cheney at the 2005 presidential inauguration

After two years, Cheney left her State Department post in 2003 to work for the Bush–Cheney 2004 reelection campaign. She participated in the campaign's "W Stands for Women" initiative to target female voters.

=== Principal deputy assistant secretary of state for Near Eastern affairs ===
On February 14, 2005, she returned to the U.S. State Department and was appointed principal deputy assistant secretary of state for Near Eastern affairs and coordinator for broader Middle East and North Africa initiatives. In this position, Cheney supported the assistant secretary of state for Near Eastern affairs, C. David Welch, and coordinated multilateral efforts to promote and support democracy and expand education and economic opportunities in the Middle East and North Africa. Cheney oversaw the launch of two semi-independent foundations, the Fund of the Future (worth $100 million), to provide capital for small businesses, and the Foundation of the Future (worth $55 million), to promote freedom of the press and democracy. In that capacity, Cheney endorsed a draft of a new Iraqi constitution.

=== Iran Syria Policy and Operations Group ===
Cheney also headed the Iran Syria Policy and Operations Group (ISOG), established in March 2006, a unit within the State Department's Bureau of Near Eastern Affairs.

In April 2006, The New York Times published a story that was critical of Cheney's work, particularly with respect to Iran. The International Republican Institute, a grants program administered by Cheney's unit in collaboration with a Republican-affiliated foundation, received particular scrutiny. Shortly before the ISOG group was dissolved, Secretary of State Condoleezza Rice initiated a major effort to engage Iran and Syria in efforts to stabilize Iraq.

== Post–State Department career ==
In June 2007 Cheney signed on as one of three national co-chairs of Fred Thompson's 2008 presidential campaign. The others were Spencer Abraham and George Allen. In a press release issued at the beginning of his campaign, Thompson said he was "very pleased to announce that former senators Abraham and Allen, as well as Liz Cheney, will serve as co-chairs of my national leadership team". He added: "These distinguished individuals bring wise counsel and invaluable experience to my campaign leadership team, and they will play a critical role in helping spread my consistent conservative message across America." After Thompson dropped out of the race, Cheney joined Mitt Romney's presidential campaign as a senior foreign policy advisor.

In October 2009, Liz Cheney, William Kristol, and Deborah Burlingame launched, as board members, the nonprofit 501(c)(4) organization Keep America Safe. The group's stated purpose is to "provide information for concerned Americans about critical national security issues". It drew strong criticism from conservative lawyers, many of whom had worked for the Bush administration, after its campaign against "The Al Qaeda 7", seven Justice Department lawyers in the Obama administration who previously had worked as defense lawyers for Guantanamo detainees. Shortly after, all information about the organization disappeared from the Internet.

In January 2012, Cheney was hired as a contributor for Fox News. She guest-hosted programs such as Hannity and Fox News Sunday. The network terminated her contract in July 2013 after she started her 2014 bid for the Senate in Wyoming.

== 2014 U.S. Senate bid ==
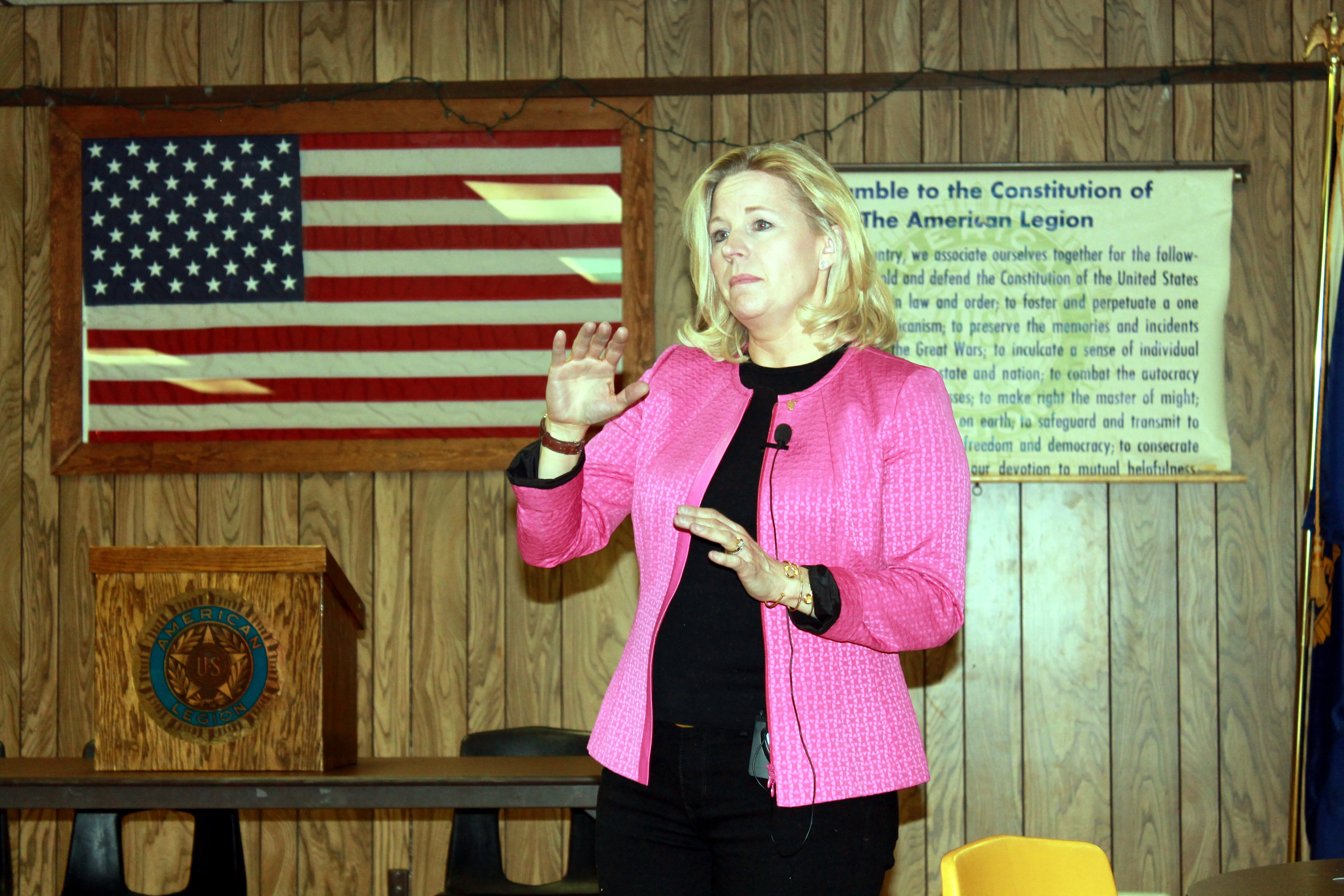
Liz Cheney campaigning for the U.S. Senate in Buffalo, Wyoming, October 2013

On July 16, 2013, Cheney launched a run for the Senate in 2014 from Wyoming as a Republican, challenging incumbent Republican senator Mike Enzi. The National Republican Senatorial Committee said it would back Enzi, as was policy. Cheney was expected to receive strong fundraising, but was subject to public perceptions of carpetbagging, having lived in Wyoming only a few years as a child before purchasing a home there in 2012. When she launched her 2014 Senate campaign, she did it with a Facebook post geotagged to McLean, Virginia, her primary residence at the time. During that campaign, The New Republic columnist Jon Ward wrote, "she talked up her Wyoming roots and dressed in boots. But when I chatted with her at one stop, her jeans were so new that her hands were stained blue from touching them." In the video she noted that the Cheney family first came to Wyoming in 1852. Her father represented Wyoming in the House from 1979 to 1989.

In her first campaign appearance in Cheyenne, Cheney said, "We have to not be afraid of being called obstructionists. Obstructing President Obama's policies and his agenda isn't actually obstruction; it's patriotism." Cheney claimed that Obama had "literally declared war" on the First and Second amendments to the United States Constitution as well as the interests of Wyoming ranchers and energy workers who faced regulations from the United States Environmental Protection Agency.

Cheney's campaign was marred by criticism from her championing of "hawkish" foreign policy positions to a public spat with her sister over her opposition to same-sex marriage. Enzi's continuing popularity made it difficult for Cheney to make inroads with Wyoming Republicans. On January 6, 2014, Cheney withdrew from the race, citing family health issues.

== U.S. House of Representatives ==
=== Elections ===
==== 2016 ====
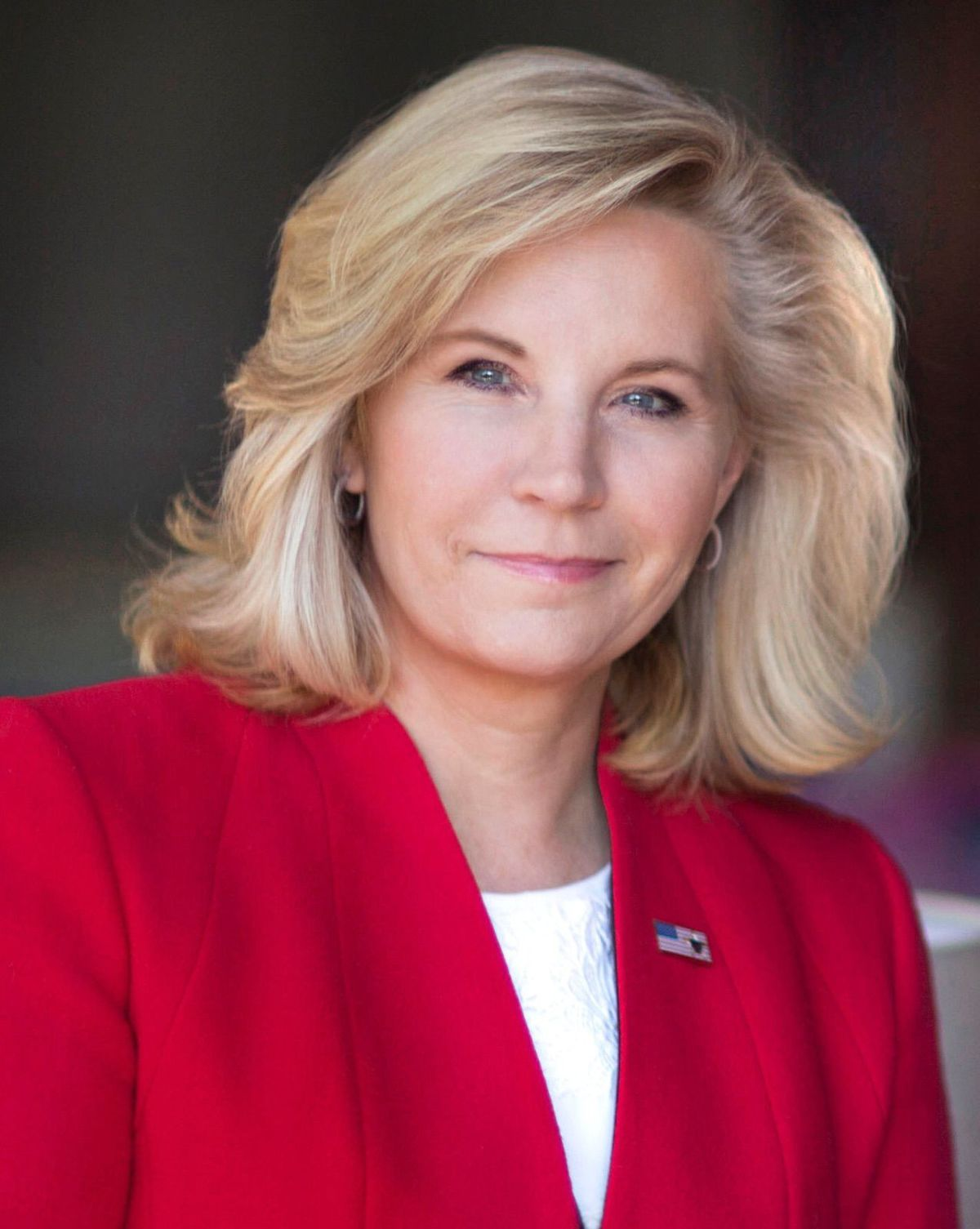
Cheney in 2016

After Wyoming congresswoman Cynthia Lummis retired in the fall of 2015, Cheney launched a campaign for her House seat on February 1, 2016. She was widely considered the front-runner, and a poll commissioned by the Casper Star-Tribune and Wyoming PBS showed her leading in the Republican primary. She won a crowded Republican primary with 38% of the vote, and went on to win the general election.

==== 2018 ====
In the November 6 general election, Cheney was reelected to the House with 127,951 votes, defeating Democrat Greg Hunter (59,898 votes), Libertarian Richard Brubaker (6,918) and Constitution Party candidate Daniel Clyde Cummings (6,069). Cheney won 21 of 23 counties, losing Albany and Teton Counties to Hunter. On November 14, the Republican membership elected Cheney chair of the House Republican Conference for the 116th Congress. In this post, she was the third-ranking Republican in the chamber, behind Minority Leader Kevin McCarthy and Minority Whip Steve Scalise.

==== 2020 ====
Cheney defeated Blake Stanley in the Republican primary with 73% of the vote, and Democrat Lynnette Grey Bull in the general election with 69% of the vote.

==== 2022 ====
Results by county: Hageman: 50–60%; 60–70%; 70–80%; 80–90%; Cheney: 50–60%; 70–80%

Cheney lost the August 16, 2022, Republican primary to pro-Trump candidate Harriet Hageman, with 28.9% of the vote to Hageman's 66.3%. Her margin of defeat was the second-worst for a House incumbent in the last 60 years, behind that of South Carolina Republican Bob Inglis in a 2010 primary runoff.

=== Tenure ===
Cheney was sworn into office on January 3, 2017. Donald Trump became president that same month, and an analysis by FiveThirtyEight found Cheney supported Trump's position in 92.9% of House votes.

She co-sponsored legislation that would end protection for gray wolves in the Endangered Species Act.

In May 2019, Cheney said that Peter Strzok and another FBI agent who sent personal text messages in which they disparaged various politicians (including Trump) sounded as if they were planning a "coup" and might be guilty of "treason".

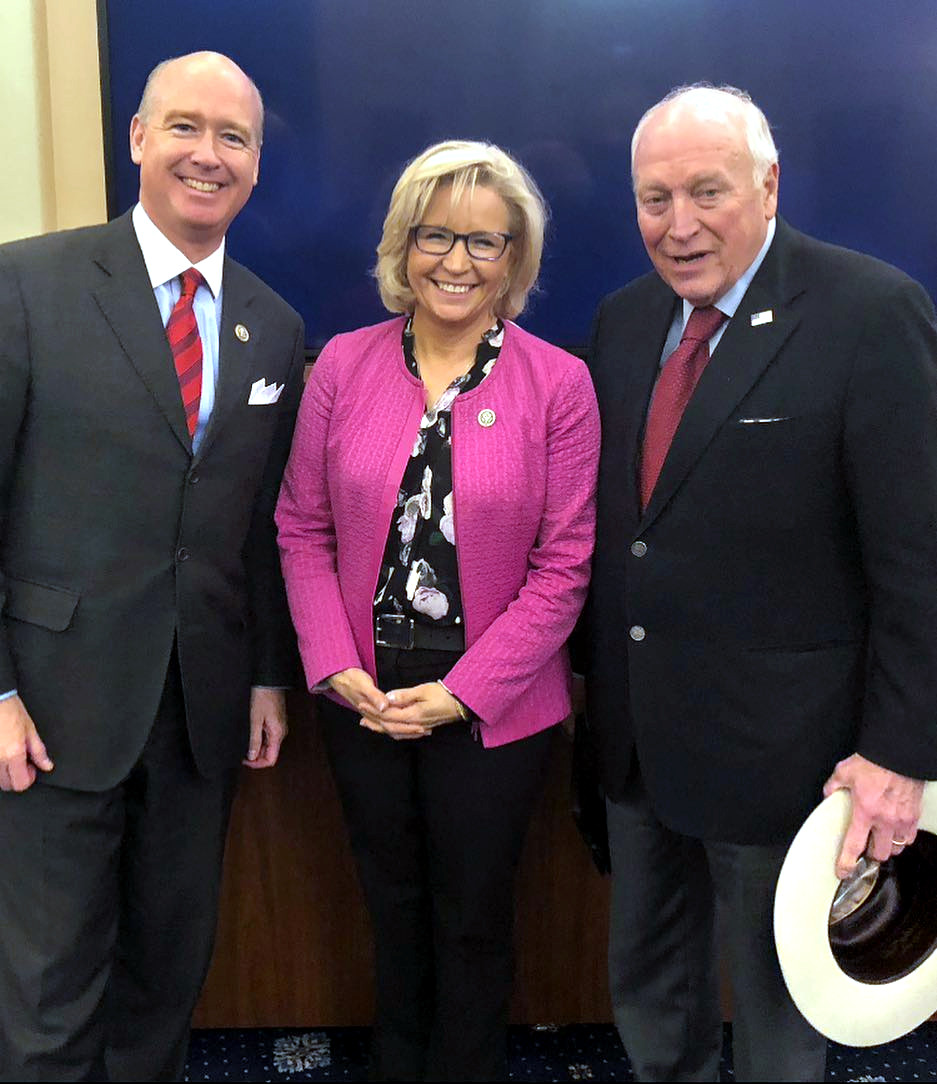
Robert Aderholt, Liz Cheney, and Liz's father Dick Cheney, in November 2018

In June 2019, Alexandria Ocasio-Cortez compared the holding centers for illegal immigrants at the Mexico–United States border to "concentration camps". Cheney criticized her words, saying they showed "disrespect" for Holocaust victims.

Speaking as chairwoman at a House Republican Conference in August 2019, Cheney said that the successful litigation (Crow Tribe et al v. Zinke) by Native tribes and environmentalists to return the grizzly bear in Greater Yellowstone to the Endangered Species Act "was not based on science or facts" but motivated by plaintiffs' "intent on destroying our Western way of life". Her statements drew comments from indigenous tribal nations and environmentalists. Tribal nations hold the grizzly sacred, and environmentalists have voiced concerns about trophy hunts, livestock and logging interests, and the gas, coal, and oil extraction industries.

Cheney condemned the Turkish invasion of the Kurdish areas in Syria, which was made possible by Trump's decision to withdraw U.S. military forces that served as a buffer between Turkey and the Kurdish areas in Syria, saying, "The U.S. is abandoning our ally the Kurds, who fought ISIS on the ground and helped protect the U.S. homeland. This decision aids America's adversaries, Russia, Iran, and Turkey, and paves the way for a resurgence of ISIS." Cheney partly blamed the Democratic Party and the impeachment inquiry into Trump for Turkey's actions, saying, "It was not an accident that the Turks chose this moment to roll across the border." A spokesperson for House Speaker Nancy Pelosi called Cheney's claim about the impact of U.S. presidential impeachment proceedings on the invasion "delusional".

At a House Republican Conference in July 2020, some Republicans, including Jim Jordan of Ohio and Andy Biggs of Arizona, criticized Cheney for defending Dr. Fauci amid the COVID-19 pandemic, and for previously endorsing Kentucky Congressman Thomas Massie's primary opponent.

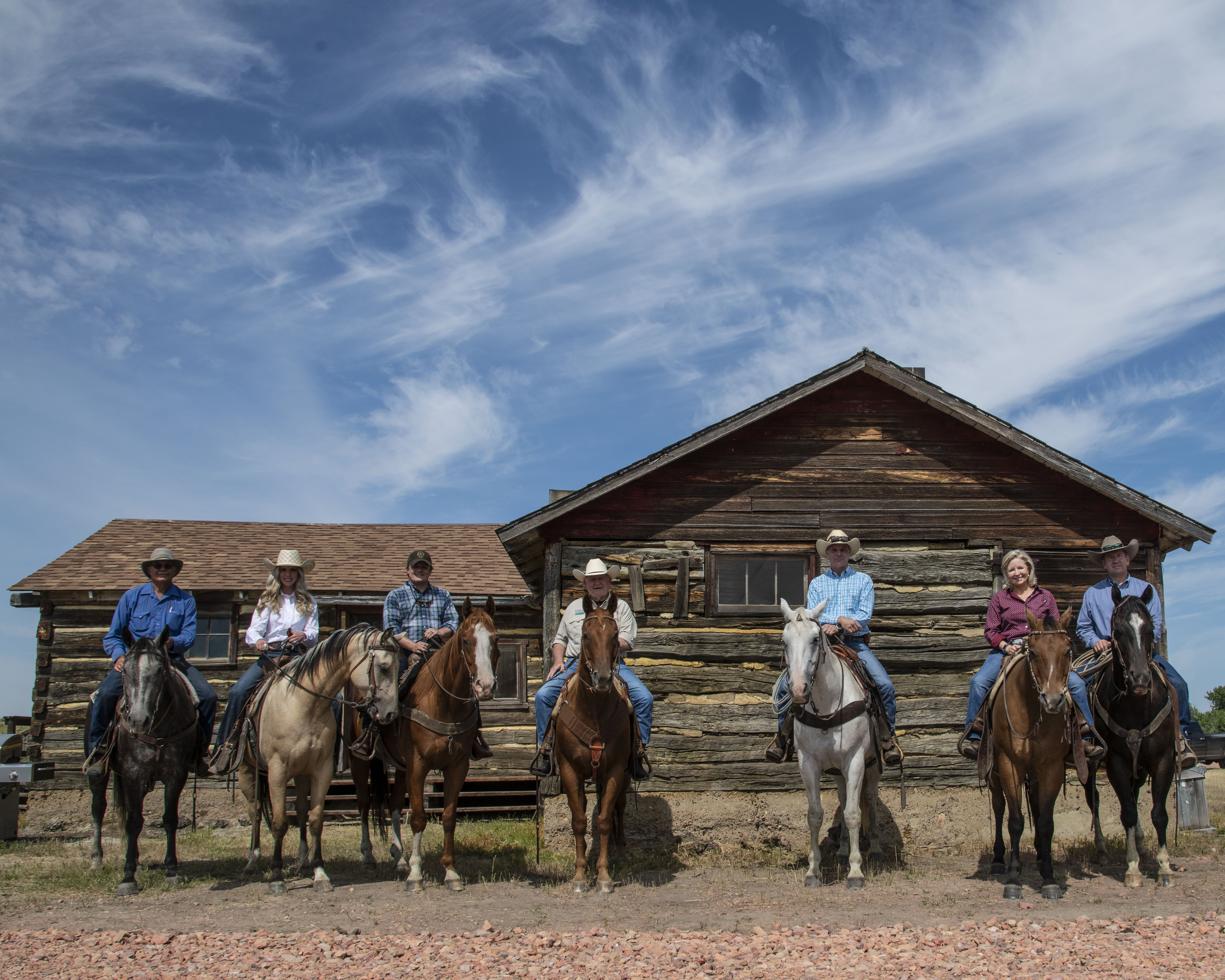
Cheney, second from right, at Fiddleback Ranch, near Douglas, Wyoming, on July 31, 2019

In September 2020, Cheney asked the Justice Department to investigate environmental groups such as the NRDC, Sea Change, and the Sierra Club, saying that "robust political and judicial activism – combined with the fact that these groups often espouse views that align with those of our adversaries – makes it all the more critical that the Department is aware of any potential foreign influence within or targeting these groups. I urge the Department to investigate Chinese and Russian attempts to influence environmental and energy policy in the United States".

Beginning during his time as a Dublin, California city councilman, Eric Swalwell was targeted by a Chinese woman believed to be an undercover officer of China's Ministry of State Security. Swalwell's general relationship with a suspected Chinese agent has been characterized as problematic, particularly given his high-profile role as a member of the House Intelligence Committee. Cheney signed a letter demanding Swalwell's removal from the House Intelligence Committee. She also said, "the extent to which [the Chinese Communist Party] caused [COVID-19] to be spread around the world has really shone a spotlight on the nature of that regime, and has really focused the attention of not just people in the United States but our allies around the world on the threat that they pose and how important it is we protect ourselves by moving supply chains, by ending our dependence on the Chinese government".

During the COVID-19 pandemic in the United States, Cheney voted against the American Rescue Plan Act of 2021 and the COVID-19 Hate Crimes Act, but for the PPP Extension Act.

From 2017 to 2021, Cheney voted in line with Trump's position around 93% of the time, supporting him more consistently in House votes than many House Republican members, even his former chief of staff Mark Meadows. In 2019, according to the New York Times, Cheney publicly feuded with Rand Paul over who was "Trumpier". According to The Atlantic, she was a "loyal Trumpist" and helped build "the party of Trump" at that time.

=== First and second impeachments of Donald Trump ===
The President of the United States summoned this mob, assembled the mob, and lit the flame of this attack. Everything that followed was his doing. None of this would have happened without the President. The President could have immediately and forcefully intervened to stop the violence. He did not. There has never been a greater betrayal by a President of the United States of his office and his oath to the Constitution.

— Liz Cheney

Cheney voted against impeaching Trump on both articles during Trump's first impeachment on December 18, 2019. On January 12, 2021, following the January 6 United States Capitol attack during the certification process for President-elect Joe Biden, Cheney said during Trump's second impeachment that she would vote to impeach Trump for his role in inciting the attack. Cheney said that Trump "lit the flame" of the riot and did nothing to stop it. Saying, "there has never been a greater betrayal by a President of the United States of his office and his oath", she supported impeachment. Nine other Republicans joined her in doing so on January 13. She was then the third-ranking Republican in the House. Jim Jordan (one of 139 House members, and 8 senators, who voted for — or supported — the objections to the Electoral College count) called for her removal from Republican Party leadership. Andy Biggs took offense specifically with the wording of Cheney's remark, saying: "She puts out a statement saying that what this president did is maybe one of the most heinous things in the history of the US presidency. Her words were used over and over again when the Democrats were making their speeches on the floor of the House. And they will be used again when the Senate opens up another bogus trial in the Senate. That is what the problem is."

Former president George W. Bush's spokesman said on January 30 that Bush supported Cheney's actions and intended to call his former vice president, Dick Cheney, to "thank him for his daughter's service". Days later, Senate minority leader Mitch McConnell said, "Liz Cheney is a leader with deep convictions and the courage to act on them. She is an important leader in our party and in our nation. I am grateful for her service and look forward to continuing to work with her on the crucial issues facing our nation". McConnell also condemned Trump supporters' "loony lies". Senator Lindsey Graham said Cheney "is one of the strongest and most reliable conservative voices in the Republican Party. She is a fiscal and social conservative, and no one works harder to ensure that our military is well prepared".

Trump supporters were angered by Cheney's vote to impeach. On February 3, 2021, the House Republican Conference held a closed-door, secret-ballot vote on whether to remove her from her position in the Republican House leadership. She held her position by a 145–61 vote, with one member voting present. After the vote, Cheney said, "we're not going to be divided and that we're not going to be in a situation where people can pick off any member of leadership". On February 6, the Wyoming Republican Party censured Cheney for her vote to impeach Trump. Cheney responded, "My vote to impeach was compelled by the oath I swore to the Constitution. Wyoming citizens know that this oath does not bend or yield to politics or partisanship. I will always fight for Wyoming values and stand up for our Western way of life." She rejected the Wyoming party's demands that she step down and noted the censure incorrectly asserted that the Capitol attack was instigated by antifa and Black Lives Matter.

Cheney raised the possibility of a criminal investigation of Trump for provoking violence and said he "does not have a role as a leader of our party going forward". In April 2021, she said she would not vote for him if he were the Republican nominee for president in 2024. In May 2021, she said: "I will do everything I can to ensure that [Trump] never again gets anywhere near the Oval Office" and "we cannot let the former president drag us backward and make us complicit in his efforts to unravel our democracy."

In his first speech since the Capitol attack, Trump attacked the Bush administration for launching the Afghanistan and Iraq wars, and described Liz Cheney as a "warmonger" and "a person that loves seeing our troops fighting" for her support for the Bush administration's foreign policy.

In March 2021 former Republican speaker Paul Ryan stated his support for Cheney. Salon wrote that although Cheney is "arch-conservative", she is "now considered too liberal for some GOP extremists". Maryland Governor Larry Hogan said "Liz Cheney is a solid conservative Republican" who "just stood up and told the truth" in May 2021.

In March 2022, in an interview on Meet The Press, Cheney said she didn't regret her vote against impeaching Trump during his first impeachment for his role in the 2019 Trump–Ukraine scandal, following the 2022 Russian invasion of Ukraine.

=== Removal as conference chair ===
In response to rising calls from House Republicans for her to be removed from her position as House Republican Conference chair after her ongoing criticism of Trump, Cheney wrote an opinion article, "The GOP is at a turning point. History is watching us", published in The Washington Post on May 5, 2021. In it, she reiterated her positions on adhering to the principles of the U.S. Constitution, upholding the law, and defending "the basic principles that underpin and protect our freedom and our democratic process". Senator Joni Ernst criticized the GOP's efforts to remove Cheney from party leadership, comparing it to cancel culture.

On the eve of a House Republican vote to remove her, Cheney made an address on the House floor after her colleagues had left the chamber, saying in part:

Full speech, May 11, 2021

Today we face a threat America has never seen before. A former president, who provoked a violent attack on this Capitol in an effort to steal the election, has resumed his aggressive effort to convince Americans that the election was stolen from him. He risks inciting further violence. Millions of Americans have been misled by the former president. They have heard only his words, but not the truth, as he continues to undermine our democratic process, sowing seeds of doubt about whether democracy really works at all. I am a conservative Republican and the most conservative of conservative principles is reverence for the rule of law. The Electoral College has voted. More than sixty state and federal courts, including multiple judges he appointed, have rejected the former president's claims. The Department of Justice in his administration investigated the former president's claims of widespread fraud and found no evidence to support them. The election is over. That is the rule of law. That is our constitutional process. Those who refuse to accept the rulings of our courts are at war with the Constitution.

Cheney was formally removed by voice vote at a closed-door House Republican Conference meeting on May 12, 2021, and was replaced by Elise Stefanik. Five GOP representatives requested a recorded vote, but McCarthy chose to decide the matter by voice vote. As it was a voice vote conducted behind closed doors, it was unclear which lawmakers supported her ouster.

After her battles with Republican leadership, Cheney spent $58,000 on a private security detail.

=== United States House Select Committee on the January 6 Attack ===
On July 1, 2021, Cheney was appointed by House speaker Nancy Pelosi to the United States House Select Committee on the January 6 Attack. Cheney served as vice chair of the committee.

While addressing the committee in June 2022, Cheney "offered a stark message to members of her party who continue to support former president Donald Trump and downplay the events of Jan. 6. 'Tonight, I say this to my Republican colleagues who are defending the indefensible: There will come a day when Donald Trump is gone, but your dishonor will remain', she said".

On January 20, 2025, just hours before he left office, President Biden announced he preemptively pardoned the January 6th Committee members in an extraordinary use of executive power against future prosecution. The President said that "the issuance of these pardons should not be mistaken as an acknowledgment that any individual engaged in any wrongdoing, nor should acceptance be misconstrued as an admission of guilt for any offense. Our nation owes these public servants a debt of gratitude for their tireless commitment to our country." On January 2, 2025, citing her work on the committee and record of public service, Cheney was awarded the Presidential Citizens Medal by Biden, who described Cheney and fellow recipient Bennie Thompson as "elected officials who served in difficult times with honor, decency, and ensure our democracy delivers".

=== Removal from Wyoming Republican Party ===
On November 13, 2021, the Wyoming GOP Central Committee voted 31–29 to no longer recognize Cheney as a member of the party. The resolution reiterated the general complaint for which it had censured her the previous February, saying that Cheney had never provided "quantifiable and or undisputed evidence" for why she had voted in favor of impeachment. There had been similar votes by two Wyoming counties three months earlier to remove her from the party.

=== Censure by Republican National Committee ===
On February 4, 2022, the Republican National Committee called the events of January 6, 2021 "legitimate political discourse" and overwhelmingly voted to censure Cheney and Representative Adam Kinzinger by voice vote for taking part in the House investigation of the Capitol assault.

=== Committee assignments ===
- Committee on Armed Services
  - Subcommittee on Intelligence and Special Operations
  - Subcommittee on Strategic Forces
- United States House Select Committee on the January 6 Attack (Vice Chair)

=== Caucus memberships ===
- Congressional Western Caucus

== Political positions ==
Cheney has described herself as a conservative Republican. Lawrence R. Jacobs has said, "Cheney is an arch-conservative. She's a hard-edged, small government, lower taxes figure and a leading voice on national defense." Jake Bernstein argued that "Liz Cheney is a true conservative in every sense of the word and she's only a moderate in relation to the radicalism that has seized the Republican party." Politico called her the "face of the anti-Trump GOP and a relic of the Republican Party before the dominance of Trump."

Cheney has several times been described as "Republican royalty". The National Interest called her the "heiress to a neoconservative throne". Salon called her "arch-conservative". The Brookings Institution argued that Cheney has a long-term strategy to become the leader of the Republican Party in the post-Trump era, and that "she's a real conservative—Democrats who like her opposition to Trump will never like her politics."

Conservative Republican John Bolton has described Cheney as "a person of integrity and character" who is involved in politics for philosophical reasons rather than self-interest, and who shares the determination of her father.

=== Continuing opposition to Donald Trump ===
In May 2021, Cheney said that she intended to be "the leader, one of the leaders, in a fight to help to restore our party". Following her primary defeat in August 2022, Cheney filed paperwork with the Federal Election Commission creating a leadership political action committee (PAC) named The Great Task. The PAC's name comes from the Gettysburg Address: Lincoln spoke of the "great task remaining before us". In September 2022, Cheney stated "if [Donald Trump] is the nominee, I won't be a Republican." The following May, The Great Task ran an ad in New Hampshire advising Republican primary voters not to support Trump's 2024 presidential campaign. As recently as June 2023, Cheney declined to rule out a presidential bid in 2024.

Beginning in 2021, Cheney repeatedly expressed an openness to potentially running for president in 2024. On September 4, 2024, Cheney told a group of students at Duke University that she would be voting for Kamala Harris in the 2024 election, stating that, "As a conservative and someone who believes in and cares about the Constitution ... I will be voting for Kamala Harris.”

During the 2022 midterm elections, Cheney said she would campaign against Republican candidates who denied or questioned the results of the 2020 presidential election. Her political action committee, the Great Task, ran TV ads imploring Republican voters in Arizona to vote against Kari Lake and Mark Finchem, the Republican nominees for governor and secretary of state, respectively. (Both lost.) In October 2022, she endorsed Democratic congresswoman Elissa Slotkin for reelection over Republican nominee Tom Barrett, a Michigan state senator who questioned the results of the 2020 election. According to Cheney, her endorsement of Slotkin was her first ever of a Democrat. Cheney also expressed support for Ohio Democrat Tim Ryan in his U.S. Senate campaign against Republican JD Vance; Vance supported false claims of widespread voter fraud in the 2020 election. Cheney also endorsed Democratic congresswoman Abigail Spanberger over her Republican opponent, Yesli Vega, who Cheney said promoted conspiracy theories.

On December 5, 2023, Cheney released a memoir, titled Oath and Honor: A Memoir and a Warning, in which she recounted her experience before, during, and after January 6, as well as her time serving as Vice Chair of the January 6th Committee, and admonished many of her Republican colleagues, including former House speaker Kevin McCarthy and current speaker Mike Johnson. The book quickly sold out and became a bestseller.

In a speech at the Democracy Summit at Dartmouth College on January 5, Cheney urged voters to reject Donald Trump as the Republican presidential nominee in the 2024 election, saying, "Show the world that we will defeat the plague of cowardice sweeping through the Republican Party." The next day, Cheney posted a tweet, criticizing comments by Trump on the American Civil War, in which he said, "I'm so attracted to seeing it, so many mistakes were made...There was something that could've been negotiated." Cheney wrote, "Question for members of the GOP—the party of Lincoln—who have endorsed Donald Trump: How can you possibly defend this?"

On April 22, 2024, Cheney published an essay in The New York Times urging the Supreme Court of the United States to quickly decide on presidential immunity to allow the legal proceedings of former President Trump to overturn the 2020 election to proceed in a timely manner.

In September 2024, Cheney said in an interview with Madison, Wisconsin's The Capital Times that Trump has "so corrupted" the Republican Party during his nine years there that it's causing the Republican Party to die and possibly become unsalvageable and that traditional conservatives such as herself may have to start a new conservative party to revive pre-Trump style conservatism.

=== Drug legislation ===
Cheney has supported bills to further restrict opioids in the face of the opioid epidemic. She voted against the Marijuana Opportunity Reinvestment and Expungement (MORE) Act of 2019/2020 (H.R. 3884), which, among other things, would have removed cannabis from the list of scheduled substances regulated by the Controlled Substances Act and establish a process to expunge criminal convictions for cannabis.

=== Foreign policy ===
Cheney has largely been considered a neoconservative and an interventionist. She opposed proposals to withdraw from Afghanistan. Cheney has criticized what she has called the "Putin wing" of the Republican Party.

Cheney supported the Iraq War, as promoted by her father, Dick Cheney.

According to Mother Jones, Cheney insists "that one of the main lies of the Bush-Cheney fraudulent case for war—that there had been a significant connection between al-Qaeda and Iraq—was true." New York Times columnist Maureen Dowd has commented that Cheney used "her patronage perch in the State Department during the Bush-Cheney years ... [and] bolstered her father's trumped-up case for an invasion of Iraq" while cheering "on her dad as he spread fear, propaganda and warped intelligence".

Cheney is a strong supporter of Israel and has expressed support for Israeli plans to annex parts of the occupied West Bank. She signed a letter to Israeli prime minister Benjamin Netanyahu that reaffirms "the unshakeable alliance between the United States and Israel".

In 2015, Cheney and her father expressed opposition to the Joint Comprehensive Plan of Action, saying that it would "lead to a nuclear-armed Iran". On June 21, 2019, after Trump called off military strikes against Iran for allegedly downing an American drone, Cheney compared Trump not attacking Iran to Barack Obama not attacking Syria in 2013. On September 18, 2019, she called for the United States to consider a "proportional military response" against Iran after it was attacking oil bases in the Saudi regions of Abqaiq and Khurais.

On June 17, 2021, Cheney was one of 160 House Republicans to vote against repealing the 2002 AUMF, which granted the Bush administration the authority to wage war with Iraq. She said that repealing the resolution "would send a message of weakness to our adversaries and allies alike".

=== Military ===
Cheney opposes the no-first-use nuclear policy. After the second round of the 2020 Democratic Party presidential debates, Cheney criticized Elizabeth Warren when she advocated the policy. Cheney voted to include provisions to draft women in the National Defense Authorization Act of 2022.

Cheney has supported the use of torture. In 2009, she defended the use of waterboarding during the George W. Bush administration, comparing it to SERE training. In 2014, she criticized President Barack Obama after he said, "we tortured some folks". Also that year, she criticized Nancy Pelosi for calling out her father for his support of using torture.

In 2018, when U.S. senator John McCain criticized CIA director nominee Gina Haspel, Cheney again defended the use of so-called enhanced interrogation techniques, saying that they "saved lives, prevented attacks, and produced intel that led to Osama bin Laden". Cheney's remarks were criticized by Meghan McCain, who responded that her father—who was tortured as a prisoner of war during the Vietnam War—"doesn't need torture explained to him".

On September 26, 2021, during an interview with Lesley Stahl on 60 Minutes, Cheney reaffirmed her support for waterboarding, once again incorrectly asserting that it is not torture.

=== January 6 commission ===
Cheney was one of 35 Republicans who joined all Democrats in voting to approve legislation to establish the January 6 commission meant to investigate the storming of the U.S. Capitol. Before the vote, she was one of few Republican lawmakers who openly expressed support for the commission.

On October 21, 2021, Cheney was one of nine House Republicans who voted to hold Steve Bannon in contempt of Congress.

=== Same-sex marriage ===
In 2013, during her Senate bid, Cheney voiced her opposition to same-sex marriage. This caused a public falling-out with her sister, Mary Cheney, who is gay and wrote in a Facebook post, "Either [y]ou think all families should be treated equally or you don't. Liz's position is to treat my family as second class citizens." (Note: Mary's wife Heather Poe wrote in a Facebook post, "Liz has been a guest in our home, has spent time and shared holidays with our children, and when Mary and I got married in 2012, she didn't hesitate to tell us how happy she was for us. To have her now say she doesn't support our right to marry is offensive to say the least.") Mary declared she would not support Liz's 2014 Senate candidacy. The family spat becoming a focus of media attention was cited as one of the reasons Cheney ended her Senate campaign.

On September 26, 2021, during an interview with Lesley Stahl on 60 Minutes, Cheney expressed regret for not supporting same-sex marriage. She was one of 47 Republicans to vote for the Respect for Marriage Act of 2022, which repealed the Defense of Marriage Act (DOMA) and requires U.S. states and territories to respect same-sex marriages (as well as interracial marriages); its final version passed the House 258–169-1.

=== Contraception ===
In 2022, Cheney voted for H.R. 8373 ("The Right to Contraception Act"), a bill designed to protect access to contraceptives and health care providers' ability to provide contraceptives and information about contraception.

=== Abortion ===
Cheney, stating she had, "always been strongly pro-life" spoke in praise of the Supreme Court's overturn of Roe v. Wade as part of their Dobbs v. Jackson Women's Health Organization ruling. Cheney's opposition to abortion has earned her a 0% approval rating from the Planned Parenthood action fund, and a 93% approval rating from the National Right to Life Committee.

=== Conspiracy theorist accusation ===
Communications academic Bud Goodall, writing in his 2010 book on progressive influence, called Cheney a "conspiracy propagandist". Cheney has denounced the far-right conspiracy theory QAnon, saying, "QAnon is a dangerous lunacy that should have no place in American politics".

In 2009, Cheney refused to denounce adherents of Barack Obama citizenship conspiracy theories (birtherism) on Larry King Live, saying that the birtherism movement existed because "people are uncomfortable with a president who is reluctant to defend the nation overseas". According to Mother Jones, the Obama citizenship conspiracy theory was an "odious lie that Liz Cheney also defended". In 2009, Cheney gave the keynote address at a dinner hosted by the Center for Security Policy, an anti-Muslim think tank deemed a hate group by the Southern Poverty Law Center and known for promoting the false claim that Obama is a Muslim.

=== 2024 United States elections ===
On September 4, 2024, Liz Cheney announced at Duke University that she is supporting Kamala Harris for president. "And as a conservative, as someone who believes in and cares about the Constitution, I have thought deeply about this, and because of the danger that Donald Trump poses, not only am I not voting for Donald Trump, but I will be voting for Kamala Harris" she said. On September 6, 2024, her father Dick Cheney announced his support for Kamala Harris, calling Trump a "coward" and accusing him of "tr[ying] to steal the last election using lies and violence to keep himself in power after the voters had rejected him." Trump responded via Truth Social, saying "Dick Cheney is an irrelevant RINO, along with his daughter".

At an Arizona rally on November 1, 2024, Trump called Cheney a "war hawk" and said "Let's put her with a rifle standing there with nine barrels shooting at her. OK? Let's see how she feels about it, you know when the guns are trained on her face. They're all war hawks when they're sitting in Washington in a nice building saying, 'Oh, gee, well let's send 10,000 troops right into the mouth of the enemy.'" Cheney responded by saying, "This is how dictators destroy free nations. They threaten those who speak against them with death." Following Trump's remarks, Kris Mayes, the Arizona attorney general, launched an investigation into whether Trump's statement qualified as a prosecutable death threat under Arizona law.

Kamala Harris' campaign welcomed Cheney's support, a move criticized by Ilhan Omar, The Nation, and Newsweek as ineffective due to her bipartisan unpopularity.

== Awards and recognition ==
Cheney was selected for the inaugural 2021 Forbes 50 Over 50, a list of notable entrepreneurs, leaders, scientists, and creators older than age 50. She was also included in the 2021 Time 100, Time's annual list of the 100 most influential people in the world.

On April 22, 2022, the John F. Kennedy Library Foundation named Cheney a Profile in Courage Award recipient for "defending democracy". The foundation said that Cheney had been a "consistent and courageous voice in defense of democracy" and that she had "refused to take the politically expedient course that most of her party embraced." The award was presented in person on May 22.

Cheney was awarded an honorary Doctor of Laws from Dartmouth College on June 9, 2024.

On January 2, 2025, Cheney was awarded the Presidential Citizens Medal by President Joe Biden, who described Cheney and fellow recipient Bennie Thompson as "elected officials who served in difficult times with honor, decency, and ensure our democracy delivers".

She was nominated for the 2025 Nobel Peace Prize for "her defense of freedom and democracy," along with the other members of the January 6th Committee.

== Personal life ==
Cheney is a United Methodist. She is married to Philip Perry, a partner at Latham & Watkins. They were married in Wyoming in 1993. They have five children. In 2012, Cheney moved to Wyoming.

== Electoral history ==
2016 Wyoming at-large Congressional district election
Primary election
Party	Candidate	Votes	%
Republican	Liz Cheney	35,043	39.8
Republican	Leland Christensen	19,330	21.9
Republican	Tim Stubson	15,524	17.6
Republican	Darin Smith	13,381	15.2
Republican	Mike Konsmo	1,363	1.6
Republican	Jason Adam Senteney	976	1.1
Republican	Rex Rammell	890	1.0
Republican	Paul Paad	886	1.0
Republican	Heath Beaudry	534	0.6
Write-in		155	0.2
Total votes		88,082	100
General election
Republican	Liz Cheney	156,176	62.0
Democratic	Ryan Greene	75,466	30.0
Constitution	Daniel Clyde Cummings	10,362	4.1
Libertarian	Lawrence Gerard Struempf	9,033	3.6
Write-in		739	0.3
Total votes		251,776	100

2018 Wyoming At-Large Congressional District election
Primary election
Party	Candidate	Votes	%
Republican	Liz Cheney (incumbent)	75,183	67.7
Republican	Rod Miller	22,045	19.9
Republican	Blake E Stanley	13,307	12.0
Write-in		478	0.4
Total votes		111,013	100
General election
Republican	Liz Cheney (incumbent)	127,963	63.6
Democratic	Greg Hunter	59,903	29.8
Libertarian	Richard Brubaker	6,918	3.4
Constitution	Daniel Clyde Cummings	6,070	3.0
Write-in		391	0.2
Total votes		201,245	100

2020 Wyoming At-Large Congressional District election
Primary election
Party	Candidate	Votes	%
Republican	Liz Cheney (incumbent)	78,870	73.5
Republican	Blake Stanley	28,039	26.1
Write-in		454	0.4
Total votes		107,363	100
General election
Republican	Liz Cheney (incumbent)	185,732	68.6
Democratic	Lynnette Grey Bull	66,576	24.6
Libertarian	Richard Brubaker	10,154	3.7
Constitution	Jeff Haggit	7,905	2.9
Write-in		525	0.2
Total votes		270,892	100

Wyoming At-Large Congressional District Republican Primary, 2022
Party	Candidate	Votes	%
Republican	Harriet Hageman	113,079	66.3
Republican	Liz Cheney (incumbent)	49,339	28.9
Republican	Anthony Bouchard	4,508	2.6
Republican	Denton Knapp	2,258	1.3
Republican	Robyn M. Belinskey	1,306	0.8
Write-in		175	0.1
Total votes		170,665	100

== Works ==
- Cheney, Liz (2011). In My Time: A Personal and Political Memoir. with Dick Cheney. New York: Threshold Editions. ISBN 978-1-4391-7619-1.
- Cheney, Liz (2015). Exceptional: Why the World Needs a Powerful America. with Dick Cheney. New York: Simon & Schuster. ISBN 978-1-5011-1541-7.
- Cheney, Liz (2023). Oath and Honor: A Memoir and a Warning. New York: Little, Brown and Company. ISBN 978-0-316-57206-4. OCLC 1377423118.

== See also ==
- Women in the United States House of Representatives

== Notes ==
U.S. House of Representatives
Preceded by Cynthia Lummis	Member of the U.S. House of Representatives from Wyoming's at-large congressional district 2017–2023	Succeeded by Harriet Hageman
New office	Vice Chair of the House January 6 Committee; 2021–2023	Position abolished
Party political offices
Preceded by Cathy McMorris Rodgers	Chair of the House Republican Conference; 2019–2021	Succeeded by Elise Stefanik
U.S. order of precedence (ceremonial)
Preceded by Stephanie Herseth Sandlin as Former U.S. Representative	Order of precedence of the United States as Former U.S. Representative	Succeeded by Rick Renzi as Former U.S. Representative
