= Exceptional: Why the World Needs a Powerful America =

2015 non-fiction book by Dick Cheney and Liz Cheney

- Authors: Dick Cheney; Liz Cheney
- Language: English
- Subject: American foreign policy
- Genre: political history
- Publisher: Simon & Schuster
- Publication date: September 1, 2015
- Pages: 324
- ISBN: 978-1-5011-1541-7

Exceptional: Why the World Needs a Powerful America is a 2015 book on American foreign policy co-authored by Dick Cheney, who served as the 46th Vice President of the United States from 2001 to 2009, and his daughter, Liz Cheney, a former official of the United States Department of State. The book offers a vehement criticism of President Barack Obama's foreign policy, and an unwavering defense of the virtue of American exceptionalism.

== Synopsis ==
The book traces the history of U.S. foreign policy and military successes and failures from Franklin D. Roosevelt's administration through the Obama administration. The authors tell the story of what they describe as the unique role the United States has played as a defender of freedom throughout the world since World War II. Drawing upon the notion of American exceptionalism, the co-authors criticize Barack Obama's and former Secretary of State Hillary Clinton's foreign policies, and offer what they see as the solutions needed to restore American greatness and power on the world stage in defense of freedom.

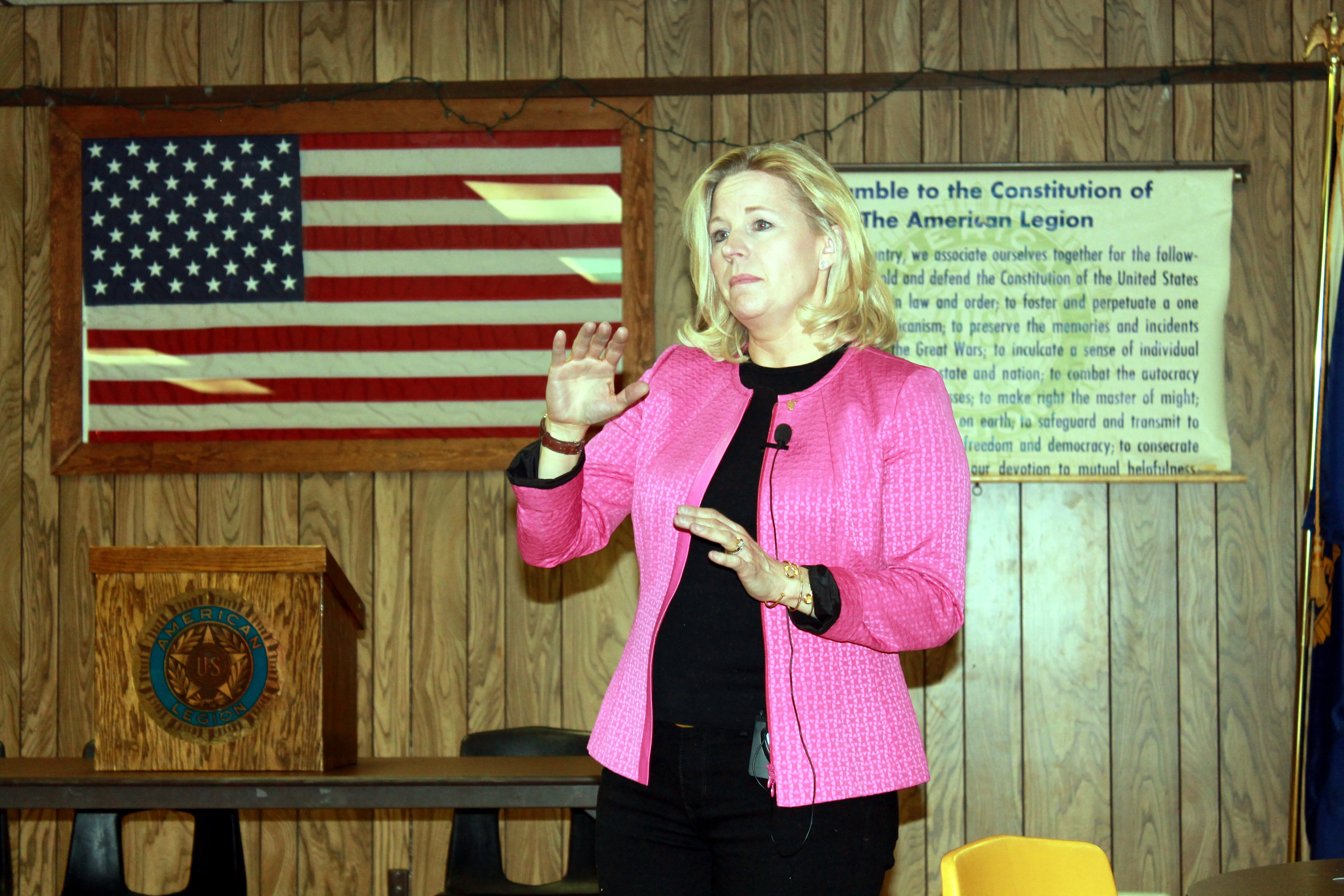
Liz Cheney in 2013

In their prologue, the authors state their purpose in the book: "We must ensure our children know the truth about who we are, what we've done, and why it is uniquely America's duty to be freedom's defender... They should learn about great men like George C. Marshall and Dwight Eisenhower and Harry Truman and Ronald Reagan." They contend that, "it is the brave men and women of the United States armed forces who defend our freedom and secure it for millions of others as well", and that America is "the most powerful, good, and honorable nation in the history of mankind, the exceptional nation."

After setting out and arguing the case for American Exceptionalism in the book, the Cheneys state: "we are, as Lincoln said, 'the last, best hope of earth'." They argue that America is not just "one more indistinguishable entity on the world stage", but that the United States has, "been essential to the preservation and progress of freedom, and those who lead us in the years ahead must remind us, as Roosevelt, Kennedy, and Reagan did, of the special role we play". The authors conclude: "we are, in fact, exceptional."

== Reception ==
In The Washington Post, Carlos Lozada wrote that "It is far from clear that Cheney's arguments... wield much influence anymore... this feels like a swansong" and described the book as "part relentlessly militaristic to-do list for the next commander in chief." Lozda also was critical of the book as "unconvincing" and a "selective history."

Writing for MSNBC, Zachary Roth describes the book as an attack on the Obama administration's foreign policy, "which, the Cheneys argue, has made the U.S. less safe by failing to wield American power around the globe. 'President Obama has departed from the bipartisan tradition going back 75 years of maintaining America's global supremacy and leadership,' the Cheneys write, calling the idea that 'America is to blame and her power must be restrained' the 'touchstone of (Obama's) ideology.'"

Reviewing the book for The Washington Times, Jennifer Harper wrote that it offers "specific suggestions from the nation's history which often appears to be at risk at the hands of revisionists with an agenda", and "makes the case for a strong national defense", while providing "practical and prudent pointers on how to restore the nation's powerful footprint on the global stage, along with advice for those to come."

Writing in the Washington Examiner, Hugh Hewitt said: "The book surprises from the first chapter, which focuses on FDR and George Marshall and their decision (after the latter had forcefully lobbied the former) to begin the rearmament of America in 1939. From there the book traces the nearly unbroken national consensus of 70 years that America ought always to be the most powerful nation on the planet, and that by being so, much good was done for us and for all", and that the "Cheneys argue, persuasively and with much recourse to the words and deeds of President Obama and former Secretary of State Hillary Clinton, that the past seven years mark a huge breach with the post-World War II consensus", concluding that the "Left will jeer, of course, but the world on fire around us demands a first responder. Vice President and Liz Cheney have penned an unmistakable reminder of which country that must be and of the consequences of turning our collective backs on our role in the world."

Reviewing the book on reason.com, Benjamin H. Friedman described it as predictable and filled with factually-flawed attacks against President Obama's foreign policy, saying it offers a steadfast defense of military interventionism and "depict[s] zero U.S. wars as unwise", asserting that "Vietnam is presented as a good cause lost by civilian interference with military requests." Friedman rejects the Cheneys' criticisms of Obama, pointing out that the Obama administration was involved in six wars and had not in any meaningful way repudiated the "tradition of militarized global hegemony that [the Cheneys] celebrate."
