= Romney: A Reckoning =

2023 biography by McKay Coppins

- Author: McKay Coppins
- Language: English
- Publisher: Scribner Book Company
- Publication date: October 24, 2023
- Pages: 416
- ISBN: 978-1982196202

Romney: A Reckoning is a 2023 biographical book about the political life of U.S. senator Mitt Romney, written by McKay Coppins, a journalist at The Atlantic. The book is largely based on Romney's reckoning with a Republican Party he once led, and his dismay at its political realignment in the era of 45th U.S. president Donald Trump. It contains many of Romney's interviews, private emails, text messages, diary entries, and documented personal grievances. It was released on October 24, 2023. It debuted at No. 3 on the New York Times Best Sellers list.

== Background ==
Romney: A Reckoning is sourced from 45 interviews with Romney across two years, The interviews were conducted weekly starting from the spring of 2021. Coppins also used Romney's private diary entries from 2011 and text messages. According to Politico, Coppins occasionally "[pressed] Romney in ways he did not always like". Coppins allowed Romney to read the manuscript before it was published and agreed to "listen to his concerns" but did not grant him any editorial control.

== Synopsis ==
The book covers Romney's political record, including the 2012 United States presidential election, his role as a senator, the 2020 election and the subsequent attack on the Capitol, and Romney's opinions of Donald Trump. In the book, Romney expressed critical views of Donald Trump and various other Republicans.

== Release ==
Romney: A Reckoning was released on October 24, 2023. According to The Salt Lake Tribune, the release of the book was "highly anticipated".

== Reception ==
In a review for The New York Times, Thomas Mallon stated that the book was "in many ways a straightforward biography," but added that it "has the intimacy of a small subgenre of political confessions". Michael Luo from The New Yorker said that the book was instructive and "a rare feat in modern-day political reporting" in which "the subject engages in actual introspection". A review in The Los Angeles Times called the book a "scoop-rich biography" and lauded the "tell-all details". NPR named it one of the best books of 2023, with Scott Detrow writing, "It's one of the best political books I’ve read in years, and it provides key insights into how drastically the Republican Party has shifted in the decade since Romney was its presidential nominee."

Reviewing for The Washington Post, Alex Beam called the book "occasionally interesting and often a little bit bland", describing Romney himself as "the biggest disappointment of the book" and remarked that it was "more like a ghostwritten autobiography than a biography of record". The book was also reviewed in The Wall Street Journal and was previewed in New York Magazine.

== See also ==
- Oath and Honor
