= International rankings of the United States =

The following are links to some international rankings of the United States.

== Civil liberties ==
- U.S. News & World Report ranked 22 of 87 in "cares about human rights"

== Economics ==
(Date ranges indicate different countries were sampled in different years.)

- GDP (nominal) - 1 of 191 (IMF, 2026)
- GDP (PPP) - 2 of 194 (IMF, 2026)
- Median income per capita - 1 of 45 (OECD, 2011-2021)
- Income per capita (nominal) - 7 of 190 (2009-2022, World Bank)
- Total wealth - 1 of 173 (UBS and Credit Suisse, 2023)
- International Labour Organization ranked 13 of 181 for labor productivity, 2019 (See List of countries by labour productivity)
- Income inequality - 61 highest out of 168 (World Bank, 1992-2022)
- World Economic Forum 2018–2019 Global Competitiveness Report, ranked 2nd out of 141 countries
- World Economic Forum 2016 Global Enabling Trade Report ranked 22nd
- The Heritage Foundation and The Wall Street Journal 2018 Index of Economic Freedom ranked 17th out of 178 economies
- Fraser Institute Economic Freedom of the World 2019 Annual Report (Economic Freedom Ratings for 2017) ranked 5th out of 152 countries and territories
- The Harvard Growth Lab ranked 12th in technological advancement, as of 2019.
- World Intellectual Property Organization: Global Innovation Index - 3 of 139 in 2026

== Education ==
- Organisation for Economic Co-operation and Development 2015 Programme for International Student Assessment, ranked 38 of 79 in mathematics, 19 of 79 in science, 13 of 78 in reading

== Environment ==
- Environmental Performance Index - 35 of 180 in 2024

== Globalization ==
- 2006 Globalization Index (A.T. Kearney) ranked 3rd
- 2010 KOF Index of Globalization ranked 27th

== Healthcare ==
As of 2023, the United States ranked 53 out of 193 countries ordered from lowest to highest infant mortality rate. As of 2020, the US ranked 65th out of 185 countries ranked by lowest maternal mortality rate.

Among wealthy nations, a study on 2016 data found the United States ranked first for child deaths by automobile accident and firearm, with overall child mortality 57% higher in the U.S. than other high-income countries, although traffic deaths were decreasing.

As of 2017, the United States life expectancy is 79.8 years at birth, ranking 42nd among 224 nations.

== Peace ==
- Vision of Humanity 2024 Global Peace Index ranked 132nd out of 162 countries

== Politics ==
- Transparency International 2024 Corruption Perceptions Index: ranked 28th lowest corruption out of 180 countries
- Reporters Without Borders 2025 Press Freedom Index: ranked 57th out of 180 countries
- V-Dem Democracy indices: ranked 2023 27th out of 179 countries
- Democracy Index (The Economist): ranked 2024 28th out of 167 countries
- World Justice Project 2024 Rule of Law Index ranked 26th out of 128 countries and jurisdictions

== Standard of living ==
- List of countries by Human Development Index: ranked 20th out of 189 countries for 2024
- List of countries by inequality-adjusted HDI: ranked 27th out of 156 countries for 2024
