= McKay Coppins =

American journalist and author

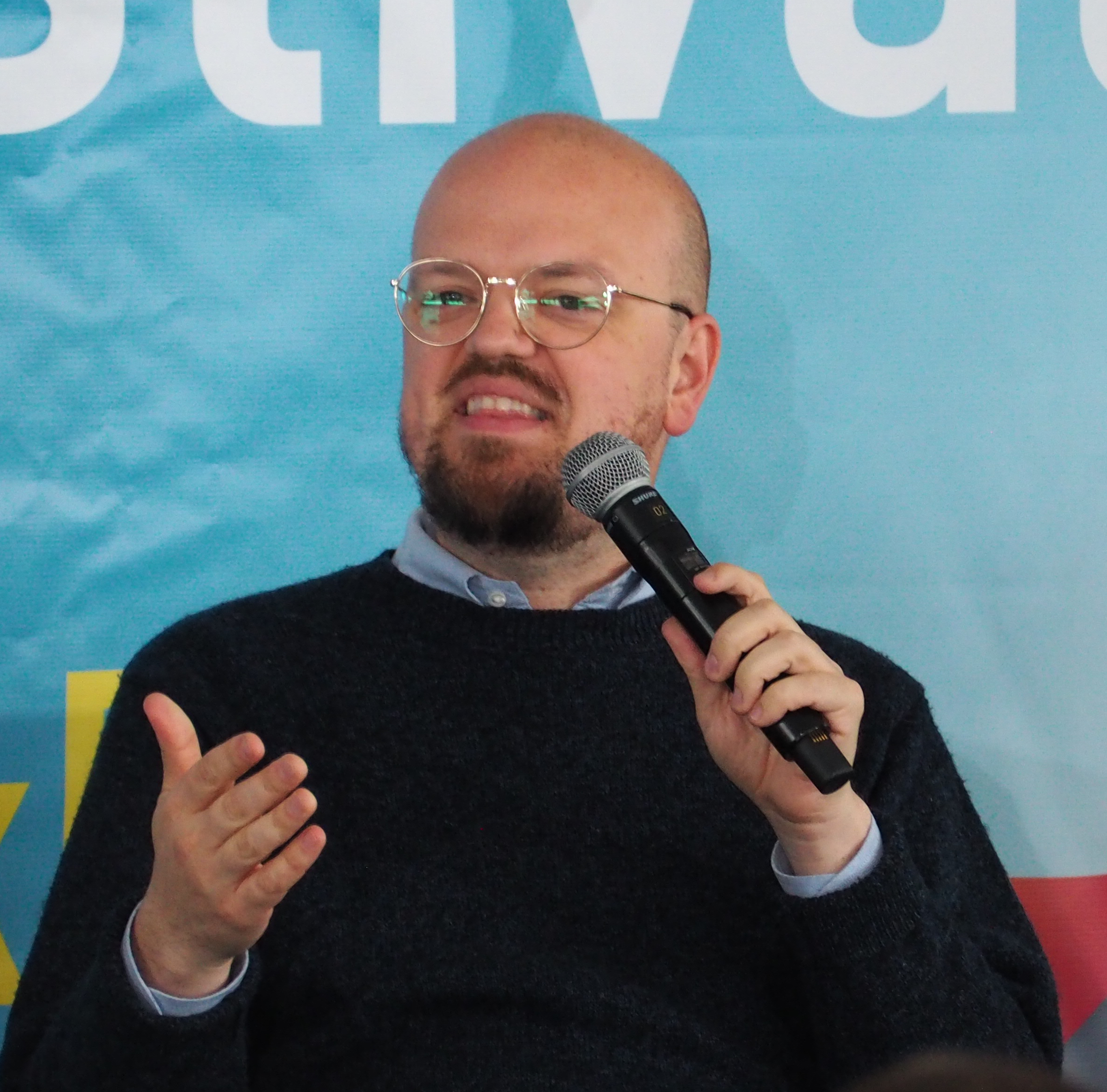
- Born: February 2, 1987 (age 39); Massachusetts, US
- Education: Brigham Young University
- Occupation: Journalist
- Known for: Reporting on politics, religion
- Website: www.theatlantic.com/author/mckay-coppins/

McKay Coppins (born February 2, 1987) is an American journalist, author, and staff writer for The Atlantic.

== Career ==
Coppins began his career at Newsweek and broke the story that Jon Huntsman Jr. would resign his ambassadorship in China and run for president.

Coppins joined BuzzFeed to cover the 2012 presidential race, becoming an important source on Governor Mitt Romney's Latter-day Saint (Mormon) faith. In 2012, Coppins was named as one of the "30 under 30" media pundits in Forbes magazine, and was listed along with three other young BuzzFeed News journalists as one of Politico's "ten breakout reporters of 2012." He is a regular contributor to CNN and MSNBC.

In the run-up to the 2016 presidential primaries, Coppins became embroiled in a public Twitter feud with Republican candidate Donald Trump after writing articles suggesting that Trump was running a "fake" campaign.

In November 2016, he announced he was leaving BuzzFeed to join The Atlantic as a staff writer.

In 2015, Coppins published The Wilderness: Deep Inside the Republican Party's Combative, Contentious, Chaotic Quest to Take Back the White House. Walter Russell Mead favorably reviewed the book in Foreign Affairs, writing that it was "[w]idely sourced and compellingly written." He has an acrimonious relationship with President Donald Trump after he called his presidential aspirations a "sham"; Trump in response called him a "dishonest slob".

Coppins released a biography of Mitt Romney titled Romney: A Reckoning on October 24, 2023. The book covers 25 years of American politics, based on 45 interviews with Romney and thousands of private emails, text messages, and diary entries.

== Personal life ==
Coppins was raised in Holliston, Massachusetts.

He graduated from Brigham Young University where he was editor of BYU's student newspaper, The Daily Universe.

Coppins and his wife were married in 2009 and have four children as of 2018.

Coppins is a member of the Church of Jesus Christ of Latter-day Saints (LDS Church), for which he served a full-time mission, and he has often written about his faith. He felt his background in the church helped him while writing about Mitt Romney, a fellow Latter-day Saint, as it helped him "in understanding the elusive candidate as an actual person".
