= Iran Syria Policy and Operations Group =

Interagency organization formed in 2006

The Iran Syria Policy and Operations Group (ISOG) was an interagency organization formed in early 2006 within the U.S. government, to influence regime change in Iran, and to influence its access to world banking and credit institutions, also working to a lesser extent to encourage regime change of Syria's government. On May 29, 2007, Undersecretary of State R. Nicholas Burns reported to the Senate Foreign Relations Committee in a letter that "The ISOG was established in March 2006 and disbanded in March 2007 in favor of a more standard process". The dissolution of the group was interpreted at the time in media reports as an indication that "hardliners" on Iran in the Bush government had lost their influence, as Secretary of State Condoleezza Rice steered the country away from militaristic policy planning and towards diplomacy.

== Organization ==
The group originally was "housed" in the same Pentagon offices that had housed the Office of Special Plans, the group that laid the groundwork for the United States invasion of Iraq. Co-chaired by Liz Cheney the secretive group met weekly for about a year. consisting of officials from the State Department, White House, Central Intelligence Agency, Treasury Department, and other agencies that worked on the issue. Other members of the group's steering committee were James F. Jeffrey, Principal Deputy Assistant Secretary of State for Near Eastern Affairs, who had headed the Iraq Policy group, and Michael Doran, a Middle East specialist from the White House. Day-to-day operations were handled by David Denehy, a senior adviser on Near Eastern Affairs at the State Department, and a former official with the International Republican Institute. Before the group's dissolution, Denehy moved his office from the State Department to the office of the vice-president and continued to manage the group's affairs from there. The group operated for little more than a year, with a beginning budget of $7 million that grew to $80 million. The group drew public scrutiny when leaks from the State Department revealed the program was outsourced to BearingPoint, a private corporation specializing in discreet management whose previous experience included overseeing the "emergent" economic development in former USSR countries and the privatization of gold mines in Kazakhstan, rather than being administered by career State Department staffers or contracted via a bid process. ISOG's first BearingPoint staffers had also been hired to man the controversial Iraq Policy and Operations Group. Critics of the outsourcing maneuver cited it as an effort to circumvent the normal diplomatic channels and federal transparency guidelines and laws.

== Operation ==
Structure (Goals. Pillars)
	Military	Financial	Economic	Relations	Media
Activity:	Military aid to Oman, Bahrain, and United Arab Emirates	"secret" Financial assistance to groups inside Syria and Iran	control Iran's access to credit, and to international banking services	Scrutinized the interactions of Iran with Lebanon, Syria, Afghanistan, and independent terrorist organizations.	Target the people of Iran, Syria, and the Persian Gulf region
Aim:	Sought to influence the flow of weaponry into Iran.	Attempt to promote regime change.	Stagnate development		

The group arranged the sale of military equipment to Iran and Syria's neighbors, and otherwise used discretionary and secret funding of undisclosed amounts to "promote democracy" in the Middle East. The ISOG has given aid to the militaries of Saudi Arabia, the United Arab Emirates, and Bahrain, and also to the political opposition in Iran. The group was disbanded after little more than a year when its mission had become controversial and at cross-purposes with Secretary of State Condoleezza Rice's initiatives for working with Iran and Syria to stabilize Iraq. At this time, ABC News reported, President Bush granted "secret" presidential approval to the CIA to conduct "black" operations to destabilize the Iranian government in a "non-lethal presidential finding" that authorized propaganda, disinformation, and manipulation of Iran's currency and international banking transactions.

== See also ==
- Nuclear program of Iran
- New Great Game
- Elizabeth Cheney
