= Party leaders of the Wyoming Senate =

Below is a list of the historic party leaders within the Wyoming Senate.

== Existing floor leaders ==
The Senate is composed of 29 Republicans and 2 Democrats.

Currently, Ogden Driskill (R) of District 1 is Senate President and Dave Kinskey (R) of District 22 is Senate Vice President. The party floor leaders are senators Larry S. Hicks (R) of District 11 and Chris Rothfuss (D) of District 9.

For the upcoming 68th session, Bo Biteman (R) of District 21 will be Senate President and Tim Salazar (R) of District 26 Vice President; the party floor leaders will be Tara Nethercott (R) of District 4 and Mike Gierau (D) of District 17.

== List of party leaders (1963–present) ==
Legislature	Dates	Democratic leader	President	Republican leader	Ref.
37th	1963 – 1965	Rudolph Anselmi (Sweetwater)	Charles Irwin (Converse)	Andrew McMaster (Niobrara)	
38th	1965 – 1967	Elmer Kinnaman (Carbon)	Andrew McMaster (Niobrara)	Earl Christensen (Weston)	
39th	1967 – 1969	Elmer Kinnaman (Carbon)	Richard Jones (Park)	Earl Christensen (Weston)	
40th	1969 – 1971	Elmer Kinnaman (Carbon)	Earl Christensen (Weston)	Peter Madsen (Sheridan)	
41st	1971 – 1973	Elmer Kinnaman (Carbon)	Peter Madsen (Sheridan)	Dick Tobin (Natrona)	
42th	1973 – 1975	J. Myers (Uinta)	Dick Tobin (Natrona)	Donald Jewett (Sublette)	
43th	1975 – 1977	David Hitchcock (Albany)	J. Myers (Uinta)	Neal Stafford (Johnson)	
44th	1977 – 1979	Robert H. Johnson (Sweetwater)	L. Donald Northrup (Park)	Neal Stafford (Johnson)	
45th	1979 – 1981	William Rector (Laramie)	Neal Stafford (Johnson)	Donald Cundall (Platte)	
46th	1981 – 1983	Dick Sedar (Natrona)	Donald Cundall (Platte)	Eddie Moore (Converse)	
47th	1983 – 1985	Steve Majhanovich (Sweetwater)	Eddie Moore (Converse)	Gerald Geis	
48th	1985 – 1987	James Norris (Laramie)	Gerald Geis	John Turner (Teton)	
49th	1987 – 1989	Win Hickey (Laramie)	John Turner (Teton)	Russell Zimmer (Goshen)	
50th	1989 – 1991	John Vinich (Fremont)	Russell Zimmer (Goshen)	Diemer True (Natrona)	
51st	1991 – 1993	Frank Prevedel (Sweetwater)	Diemer True (Natrona)	Jerry B. Dixon (Crook/Weston)	
52nd	1993 – 1995	Lisa F. Kinney (9th)	Jerry B. Dixon (1st)	Boyd L. Eddins (16th)	
53rd	1995 – 1997	Jim Applegate (8th)	Boyd L. Eddins (16th)	Bob Grieve (11th)	
54th	1997 – 1999	Guy E. Cameron (7th)	Bob Grieve (11th)	Jim Twiford (2nd)	
55th	1999 – 2001	Mark O. Harris (14th)	Jim Twiford (2nd)	Hank Coe (18th)	
56th	2001 – 2003	Rich Cathcart (6th)	Hank Coe (18th)	April Brimmer-Kunz (4th)	
57th	2003 – 2005	E. Jayne Mockler (8th)	April Brimmer-Kunz (4th)	Grant Larson (22nd)	
58th	2005 – 2007	Rae Lynn Job (12th)	Grant Larson (17th)	John Schiffer (22nd)	
59th	2007 – 2009	Ken Decaria (15th)	John Schiffer (22nd)	John Hines (23rd)	
60th	2009 – 2011	Kathryn Sessions (7th)	John Hines (23rd)	Jim Anderson (2nd)	
61st	2011 – 2013	John Hastert (13th)	Jim Anderson (2nd)	Tony Ross (4th)	
62nd	2013 – 2015	Chris Rothfuss (9th)	Tony Ross (4th)	Phil Nicholas (10th)	
63rd	2015 – 2017	Chris Rothfuss (9th)	Phil Nicholas (10th)	Eli Bebout (26th)	
64th	2017 – 2019	Chris Rothfuss (9th)	Eli Bebout (26th)	Drew Perkins (29th)	
65th	2019 – 2021	Chris Rothfuss (9th)	Drew Perkins (29th)	Dan Dockstader (16th)	
66th	2021 – 2023	Chris Rothfuss (9th)	Dan Dockstader (16th)	Ogden Driskill (1st)	
67th	2023 – 2025	Chris Rothfuss (9th)	Ogden Driskill (1st)	Larry S. Hicks (11th)	
68th	2025 – present	Mike Gierau (17th)	Bo Biteman (21st)	Tara Nethercott (4th)	
