= 2004 Wyoming Senate election =

- November 2, 2004

16 of 30 seats in the Wyoming Senate Even-numbered seats up, unexpired term in District 1
	Majority party	Minority party
Leader	April Brimmer-Kunz (retiring)	E. Jayne Mockler
Party	Republican	Democratic
Leader's seat	4th district	8th district
Seats before	20	10
Seats after	23	7
Seat change	▲3	▼3
Popular vote	86,459	30,103
Percentage	74.17%	25.83%
Senate President before election
April Brimmer-Kunz
Republican
Elected Senate President
Grant Larson
Republican

The 2004 Wyoming Senate election was held on November 2, 2004, to elect members to the Wyoming Senate for its 58th session as part of the 2004 United States elections. Partisan primaries were held on August 17. All even-numbered seats were up for election as well as an unexpired term for District 1. Republicans picked up three seats in the legislative chamber.

== Predictions ==
Source	Ranking	As of
Rothenberg	Safe R	October 1, 2004

== Overview ==
General election summary
Party	Candidates	Votes	%	Seats				
Party	Candidates	Votes	%	Before 57th Leg.	Up	Won	After 58th Leg.	+/–
Republican	14	86,459	74.17	20	11	14	23	▲3
Democratic	9	30,103	25.83	10	5	2	7	▼3
Total		116,562	100%	30	16		30	Steady

†: Incumbent did not run for reelection. ††: Incumbent defeated in primary. †††: Incumbent defeated in general election. ‡: Unexpired term.

District	Incumbent	Party	Elected Senator	Party
1st ‡	Chuck Townsend	Rep	Chuck Townsend	Rep
2nd	Jim Anderson	Rep	Jim Anderson	Rep
4th	April Brimmer-Kunz †	Rep	Tony Ross	Rep
6th	Jana H. Ginter	Dem	Wayne Johnson	Rep
8th	E. Jayne Mockler	Dem	E. Jayne Mockler	Dem
10th	Irene Devin †	Rep	Phil Nicholas	Rep
12th	Rae Lynn Job	Dem	Rae Lynn Job	Dem
14th	Larry Caller †††	Dem	Stan Cooper	Rep
16th	Delaine Roberts †	Rep	Pat Aullman	Rep
18th	Hank Coe	Rep	Hank Coe	Rep
20th	Gerald Geis	Rep	Gerald Geis	Rep
22nd	John Schiffer	Rep	John Schiffer	Rep
24th	Dick Erb ††	Rep	Michael Von Flatern	Rep
26th	Robert A. Peck	Rep	Robert A. Peck	Rep
28th	Keith Goodenough †††	Dem	Kit Jennings	Rep
30th	Charles K. Scott	Rep	Charles K. Scott	Rep
