= 1996 Wyoming Senate election =

- November 5, 1996

15 of 30 seats in the Wyoming Senate Even-numbered seats up
	Majority party	Minority party
Leader	Boyd L. Eddins (retiring)	James L. Applegate (retiring)
Party	Republican	Democratic
Leader's seat	16th district	8th district
Seats before	20	10
Seats after	21	9
Seat change	▲1	▼1
Popular vote	58,499	31,519
Percentage	64.29%	34.64%
Senate President before election
Boyd L. Eddins
Republican
Elected Senate President
Bob Grieve
Republican

The 1996 Wyoming Senate election was held on November 5, 1996, to elect members to the Wyoming Senate for its 54th session as part of the 1996 United States elections. Partisan primaries were held on August 20. All even-numbered seats were up for election. Republicans flipped one Democratic seat.

The election was held concurrently with elections for the state house, U.S. Representative, U.S. Senate, and U.S. President.

== Summary ==
Party	Candidates			Seats
Party	Num.	Vote	%	Before	Up	Won	After	+/–
Republicans	12	58,499	64.29%	20	9	10	21	▲1
Democrats	9	31,519	34.64%	10	6	5	9	▼1
Libertarians	1	968	1.06%	0	0	0	0	Steady

District	Incumbent		Elected		Result	Notes
District	Party	Senator	Party	Senator		Notes
SD 2	Rep.	Jim Twiford	Rep.	Jim Twiford	Rep hold.
SD 4	Rep.	April Brimmer-Kunz	Rep.	April Brimmer-Kunz	Rep hold.
SD 6	Dem.	Rich Cathcart	Dem.	Rich Cathcart	Dem hold.
SD 8	Dem.	James L. Applegate	Dem.	E. Jayne Mockler	Dem hold.	Incumbent retired.
SD 10	Dem.	Pete Maxfield	Rep.	Irene Devin	Rep gain.	Incumbent retired to run for U.S. House.
SD 12	Dem.	Frank Prevedel	Dem.	Rae Lynn Job	Dem hold.	Incumbent retired.
SD 14	Dem.	Mark O. Harris	Dem.	Mark O. Harris	Dem hold.
SD 16	Rep.	Boyd L. Eddins	Rep.	Delaine Roberts	Rep hold.	Incumbent retired.
SD 18	Rep.	Hank Coe	Rep.	Hank Coe	Rep hold.
SD 20	Rep.	Gerald Geis	Rep.	Gerald Geis	Rep hold.
SD 22	Rep.	John Schiffer	Rep.	John Schiffer	Rep hold.
SD 24	Rep.	Michael Enzi	Rep.	Dick Erb	Rep hold.	Incumbent elected to U.S. Senate.
SD 26	Rep.	Bob Peck	Rep.	Bob Peck	Rep hold.
SD 28	Dem.	Keith Goodenough	Dem.	Keith Goodenough	Dem hold.
SD 30	Rep.	Charles K. Scott	Rep.	Charles K. Scott	Rep hold.

== Detailed results ==
Of the fifteen seats up for election, only six saw competition between Republican and Democratic candidates, and one between a Republican and Libertarian, with eight races completely unopposed. Only four races were decided by a margin of fewer than fifteen percentage points.

=== General election ===
District	Republicans			Democrats			Libertarians			Total
District	Candidate	Vote	%	Candidate	Vote	%	Candidate	Vote	%	Total	Maj.	%
SD 2	Jim Twiford	6,032	100.00	—	—	—	—	—	—	6,032	+6,032	+100.00
SD 4	April Brimmer-Kunz	4,264	51.25	Jim Narva	4,056	48.75	—	—	—	8,320	+208	+2.50
SD 6	—	—	—	Rich Cathcart	5,158	100.00	—	—	—	5,158	-5,158	-100.00
SD 8	—	—	—	E. Jayne Mockler	4,069	100.00	—	—	—	4,069	-4,069	-100.00
SD 10	Irene Devin	4,179	58.67	Doug Bryant	2,944	41.33	—	—	—	7,123	+1,235	+17.34
SD 12	Becky Costantino	2,616	46.09	Rae Lynn Job	3,060	53.91	—	—	—	5,676	-444	-7.82
SD 14	—	—	—	Mark O. Harris	4,278	100.00	—	—	—	4,278	-4,278	-100.00
SD 16	Delaine Roberts	6,907	100.00	—	—	—	—	—	—	6,907	+6,907	+100.00
SD 18	Hank Coe	6,814	100.00	—	—	—	—	—	—	6,814	+6,814	+100.00
SD 20	Gerald Geis	5,638	100.00	—	—	—	—	—	—	5,638	+5,638	+100.00
SD 22	John Schiffer	6,226	100.00	—	—	—	—	—	—	6,226	+6,226	+100.00
SD 24	Dick Erb	3,278	55.62	James Hladky	2,616	44.38	—	—	—	5,894	+662	+11.23
SD 26	Bob Peck	5,195	84.29	—	—	—	James Blomquist	968	15.71	6,163	+4,227	+68.59
SD 28	Rick Bonander	2,994	44.30	Keith Goodenough	3,764	55.70	—	—	—	6,758	-770	-11.39
SD 30	Charles K. Scott	4,356	73.46	Crash Cook	1,574	26.54	—	—	—	5,930	+2,782	+46.91

=== Republican primaries ===
Only two Republican primary races saw more than one candidate stand. Races in which no candidates filed will not be shown.

District	Winners			Runners-up			Total
District	Candidate	Vote	%	Candidate	Vote	%	Total	Maj.	%
SD 2	Jim Twiford	2,964	100.00	—	—	—	2,964	2,964	100.00
SD 4	April Brimmer-Kunz	2,670	100.00	—	—	—	2,670	2,670	100.00
SD 10	Irene Devin	1,824	100.00	—	—	—	1,824	1,824	100.00
SD 12	Becky Costantino	1,030	100.00	—	—	—	1,030	1,030	100.00
SD 16	Delaine Roberts	3,054	100.00	—	—	—	3,054	3,054	100.00
SD 18	Hank Coe	3,636	100.00	—	—	—	3,636	3,636	100.00
SD 20	Gerald Geis	1,891	67.32	John Nevsimal	918	32.68	2,809	973	34.64
SD 22	John Schiffer	3,625	100.00	—	—	—	3,625	3,625	100.00
SD 24	Dick Erb	2,407	100.00	—	—	—	2,407	2,407	100.00
SD 26	Bob Peck	2,730	100.00	—	—	—	2,730	2,730	100.00
SD 28	Rick Bonander	1,584	60.57	Max Morton	1,031	39.43	2,615	553	21.15
SD 30	Charles K. Scott	2,064	100.00	—	—	—	2,064	2,064	100.00

=== Democratic primaries ===
No Democratic primary race saw more than one candidate stand. Races in which no candidates filed will not be shown.

District	Winners
District	Candidate	Vote	%
SD 4	Jim Narva	1,637	100.00
SD 6	Rich Cathcart	1,265	100.00
SD 8	E. Jayne Mockler	1,336	100.00
SD 10	Doug Bryant	1,127	100.00
SD 12	Rae Lynn Job	1,994	100.00
SD 14	Mark O. Harris	1,342	100.00
SD 24	James Hladky	400	100.00
SD 28	Keith Goodenough	1,460	100.00
SD 30	Crash Cook	1,074	100.00
