= List of third-party and independent performances in Wyoming state legislative elections =

Hundreds of third-party and independent candidates have run for state legislative seats in the state of Wyoming. Only candidates who achieved more than 5% of the vote since 1996 are included.

== Candidate won seat ==
=== State house ===
Election	District	Party	Candidate	Votes	%	Place	Ref
2020	HD22	Independent	Jim Roscoe	3,191	49.7 / 100	Elected; 1st of 2	
2020	HD39	Libertarian	Marshall Burt	1,696	46.3 / 100	Elected; 1st of 2	
2018	HD22	Independent	Jim Roscoe	2,495	53.5 / 100	Elected; 1st of 2	
1982	Niobrara County	Independent	Melvin ZumBrunnen	852	56.28 / 100	Elected; 1st of 2	
1976	Johnson County	Independent	William C. Holland	1,537	56.65 / 100	Re-elected; 1st of 2	
1974	Johnson County	Independent	William C. Holland	1,557	60.33 / 100	Re-elected; 1st of 2	
1972	Johnson County	Independent	William C. Holland	1,308	50.06 / 100	Re-elected; 1st of 2	
1970	Johnson County	Independent	William C. Holland	1,096	50.35 / 100	Elected; 1st of 2	

== Candidate placed ahead of major party nominee ==
=== State senate ===
Election	District	Party	Candidate	Votes	%	Place	Ref
1980	Campbell–Johnson (2-seat)	Independent	Steve Tarver	3,076	22.71 / 100	3rd of 4 Beat Democrat	

=== State house ===
Election	District	Party	Candidate	Votes	%	Place	Ref
2022	HD5	Independent	Bruce Jones	1,079	29.6 / 100	Beat Democrat; 2nd of 3	
2016	HD24	Independent	Sandy Newsome	1,421	27.4 / 100	Beat Democrat; 2nd of 3	
2016	HD26	Constitution	Joyce Collins	1,001	24.2 / 100	Beat Democrat; 2nd of 3	
2014	HD49	Independent	Clarence Vranish	724	29.2 / 100	Beat Democrat; 2nd of 3	
2008	HD6	Independent	Tom L. Strock	1,015	25.0 / 100	Beat Democrat; 2nd of 3	
1976	Campbell County	Independent	Dick Mader	1,857	20.54 / 100	3rd of 5 Beat Rep. and Dem.	

== Other candidates ==
=== State senate ===
Election	District	Party	Candidate	Votes	%	Place	Ref
2022	SD11	Constitution	Michael Ray Williams	1,104	19.4 / 100	2nd of 2	
2022	SD17	Libertarian	Amanda Padilla	421	5.0 / 100	3rd of 3	
2022	SD23	Independent	Patricia Junek	1,369	26.6 / 100	2nd of 2	
2020	SD30	Libertarian	Wendy Degroot	1,762	21.2 / 100	2nd of 2	
2018	SD13	Independent	Ted L. Barney	889	15.1 / 100	3rd of 3	
2016	SD6	Independent	Kym Zwonitzer	4,314	45.3 / 100	2nd of 2	
2016	SD18	Independent	Cindy Baldwin	4,256	40.6 / 100	2nd of 2	
2012	SD6	Country	William R. Hill	1,663	19.0 / 100	2nd of 2	
2012	SD14	Country	John Vincent Love	978	11.7 / 100	2nd of 2	
2012	SD24	Country	Bradley Edward Kramer	1,112	14.8 / 100	2nd of 2	
2010	SD11	Independent	Ken Casner	534	10.0 / 100	2nd of 2	
2006	SD11	Independent	Ken Casner	544	9.5 / 100	3rd of 3	
2000	SD10	Libertarian	Patrick O'Reilly	387	5.3 / 100	3rd of 3	
1996	SD26	Libertarian	James Blomquist	968	15.7 / 100	2nd of 2	
1994	SD22	Libertarian	Larry Gray	984	14.72 / 100	2nd of 2	
1992	SD19	Libertarian	Frank Hart	1,058	17.35 / 100	2nd of 2	
1986	Fremont County	Independent	Howard O'Connor	2,534	24.26 / 100	2nd of 2	
1984	Campbell–Johnson (2-seat)	Libertarian	Larry E. Gray	1,434	5.97 / 100	4th of 4	
1984	Fremont County	Independent	Howard O'Connor	1,291	9.81 / 100	3rd of 3	

=== State house ===
Election	District	Party	Candidate	Votes	%	Place	Ref
2024	HD10	Independent	Tim Forbis	865	17.80 / 100	2nd of 2	
2022	HD4	Independent	Dan Brecht	1,436	35.0 / 100	2nd of 2	
2022	HD5	Independent	Todd Peterson	1,603	41.6 / 100	2nd of 2	
2022	HD8	Independent	Brenda Lyttle	1,214	29.5 / 100	2nd of 2	
2022	HD15	Libertarian	Patrick Gonzalez	602	26.3 / 100	2nd of 2	
2022	HD18	Libertarian	Dennis B. Laughlin	590	16.8 / 100	2nd of 2	
2022	HD22	Independent	Bob Strobel	1,681	40.1 / 100	2nd of 2	
2022	HD29	Libertarian	Marshall Burt	586	22.8 / 100	2nd of 2	
2022	HD41	Constitution	Matt Freeman	252	8.7 / 100	3rd of 3	
2022	HD48	Libertarian	Misty Morris	743	30.9 / 100	2nd of 2	
2022	HD50	Libertarian	Carrie Satterwhite	702	16.0 / 100	2nd of 2	
2022	HD53	Constitution	Larry Williamson	279	13.5 / 100	2nd of 2	
2022	HD54	Independent	Jeff Martin	1,560	35.2 / 100	2nd of 2	
2022	HD55	Libertarian	Bethany Bades	1,175	38.2 / 100	2nd of 2	
2020	HD33	Independent	Clinton D. Wagon	375	11.3 / 100	3rd of 3	
2020	HD38	Libertarian	Shawn Johnson	1,068	22.8 / 100	2nd of 2	
2020	HD47	Libertarian	Lela Konecny	886	20.3 / 100	2nd of 2	
2020	HD50	Independent	Cindy Johnson Bennett	1,241	20.6 / 100	2nd of 2	
2020	HD55	Libertarian	Bethany Baldes	2,026	47.8 / 100	2nd of 2	
2020	HD58	Libertarian	Joseph S. Porambo	646	17.8 / 100	2nd of 2	
2018	HD31	Independent	Dave Hardesty	814	29.8 / 100	2nd of 2	
2018	HD32	Independent	Chad M Trebby	1,070	31.2 / 100	2nd of 2	
2018	HD40	Independent	Chris Schock	1,552	37.7 / 100	2nd of 2	
2018	HD55	Libertarian	Bethany Baldes	1,592	47.2 / 100	2nd of 2	
2016	HD4	Constitution	Joe Michaels	1,185	22.9 / 100	2nd of 2	
2016	HD58	Independent	Joe Porambo	250	8.3 / 100	3rd of 3	
2014	HD26	Constitution	Joyce Collins	1,179	38.1 / 100	2nd of 2	
2014	HD37	Independent	Anthony "Edis" Allen	907	26.7 / 100	2nd of 2	
2012	HD4	Constitution	Bill Motley	1,099	23.1 / 100	2nd of 2	
2012	HD9	Constitution	Skip Eshelman	554	14.8 / 100	2nd of 4	
2012	HD9	Libertarian	Charles Kenworthy	385	10.3 / 100	3rd of 4	
2012	HD9	Country	Perry Helgeson	194	5.2 / 100	4th of 4	
2012	HD22	Independent	Bill Winney	1,927	44.1 / 100	2nd of 2	
2012	HD46	Libertarian	Michael Hendricks	747	19.7 / 100	2nd of 2	
2012	HD55	Libertarian	Bethany K. Baldes	227	5.6 / 100	3rd of 3	
2010	HD24	Libertarian	Vernel C. Gail	497	13.3 / 100	2nd of 2	
2010	HD34	Libertarian	Richard Brubaker	549	16.7 / 100	2nd of 2	
2010	HD40	Independent	Richard Tass	1,516	35.0 / 100	2nd of 2	
2010	HD52	Independent	Travis Hakert	705	24.9 / 100	2nd of 3	
2010	HD52	Libertarian	Nicholas De Laat	426	15.1 / 100	3rd of 3	
2010	HD53	Libertarian	John Wiltbank	242	12.5 / 100	2nd of 2	
2008	HD29	Libertarian	Elmer Kuball	690	17.5 / 100	2nd of 2	
2008	HD34	Libertarian	Richard Brubaker	770	19.8 / 100	2nd of 2	
2008	HD57	Libertarian	Timothy A. DeLany	191	5.5 / 100	3rd of 3	
2006	HD34	Libertarian	Richard Brubaker	597	19.5 / 100	2nd of 2	
2006	HD40	Independent	Richard L. Tass	1,695	43.4 / 100	2nd of 2	
2006	HD53	Independent	Sue Howard	681	32.1 / 100	2nd of 2	
2006	HD57	Independent	Timothy A. DeLany	538	21.2 / 100	2nd of 2	
2004	HD57	Libertarian	Hubert AR Townsend	221	6.1 / 100	3rd of 3	
2002	HD26	Libertarian	Paul B. Garrison	419	14.4 / 100	2nd of 2	
2002	HD42	Independent	Ron Pinther	544	24.7 / 100	2nd of 2	
2002	HD50	Libertarian	Gary Carlson	756	21.8 / 100	2nd of 2	
2000	HD5	Libertarian	Mark Spungin	657	18.4 / 100	2nd of 2	
2000	HD29	Libertarian	Elmer Kuball	616	20.2 / 100	2nd of 2	
2000	HD54	Libertarian	Marie Brossman	608	16.2 / 100	2nd of 2	
1998	HD5	Libertarian	Lewis Stock	571	19.1 / 100	2nd of 2	
1998	HD24	Libertarian	Jim Brady	742	20.7 / 100	2nd of 2	
1998	HD29	Libertarian	Joel McGinnis	177	6.6 / 100	3rd of 3	
1998	HD47	Independent	Christine E. Wickstrom	1,174	37.3 / 100	2nd of 2	
1996	HD24	Libertarian	Anne Durney	843	20.2 / 100	2nd of 2	
1996	HD25	Libertarian	Frank Hart	501	15.0 / 100	2nd of 2	
1996	HD40	Libertarian	Larry Gray	607	18.1 / 100	2nd of 2	
1996	HD42	Libertarian	Craig McCune	472	17.8 / 100	2nd of 2	
1996	HD59	Independent	Patrick LeBrun	287	8.9 / 100	3rd of 3	
1994	HD21	Independent	Larry Call	1,941	50.00 / 100	Tied for 1st Lost drawing	
1994	HD45	Libertarian	Thomas Brian Fox	169	6.12 / 100	3rd of 3	
1994	HD55	Libertarian	Jim Blomquist	541	16.65 / 100	2nd of 2	
1992	HD14	Independent	Doug Bryant	339	13.24 / 100	3rd of 3	
1992	HD35	Libertarian	Ed Cingoranelli	170	5.02 / 100	3rd of 3	
1992	HD40	Libertarian	Larry E. Gray	474	14.83 / 100	2nd of 2	
1992	HD57	Libertarian	Anthony Cingoranelli	183	5.66 / 100	3rd of 3	
1990	Park County (3-seat)	Independent	Marilyn J. Lanchbury	3,558	17.74 / 100	4th of 4	
1986	Big Horn County (2-seat)	Independent	Ed Ericksen	1,196	17.53 / 100	3rd of 3	
