= 2000 Wyoming Senate election =

- November 7, 2000

15 of 30 seats in the Wyoming Senate Even-numbered seats up
	Majority party	Minority party
Leader	Jim Twiford	Mark O. Harris
Party	Republican	Democratic
Leader's seat	2nd district	14th district
Seats before	20	10
Seats after	20	10
Seat change	Steady	Steady
Popular vote	64,703	31,844
Percentage	66.75%	32.85%
- Results by district
Senate President before election
Hank Coe
Republican
Elected Senate President
April Brimmer-Kunz
Republican

The 2000 Wyoming Senate election was held on November 7, 2000, to elect members to the Wyoming Senate for its 56th session as part of the 2000 United States elections. Partisan primaries were held on August 22. All even-numbered seats were up for election. Neither party made any gains in the chamber. Of the fifteen seats up for election, seven went to either party unopposed.

== Summary ==
General election summary
Party	Candidates	Votes	%	Seats				
Party	Candidates	Votes	%	Before 55th Leg.	Up	Won	After 56th Leg.	+/–
Republican	13	64,703	66.75	20	10	10	20	Steady
Democratic	10	31,844	32.85	10	5	5	10	Steady
Libertarian	1	387	0.40	0	0	0	0	Steady
Total		96,934	100%	30	15		30	Steady

District	Incumbent	Party	Elected senator	Party
2nd	Jim Twiford	Rep	Jim Anderson	Rep
4th	April Brimmer-Kunz	Rep	April Brimmer-Kunz	Rep
6th	Rich Cathcart	Dem	Rich Cathcart	Dem
8th	E. Jayne Mockler	Dem	E. Jayne Mockler	Dem
10th	Irene Devin	Rep	Irene Devin	Rep
12th	Rae Lynn Job	Dem	Rae Lynn Job	Dem
14th	Mark O. Harris	Dem	Mark O. Harris	Dem
16th	Delaine Roberts	Rep	Delaine Roberts	Rep
18th	Hank Coe	Rep	Hank Coe	Rep
20th	Gerald Geis	Rep	Gerald Geis	Rep
22nd	John Schiffer	Rep	John Schiffer	Rep
24th	Dick Erb	Rep	Dick Erb	Rep
26th	Robert A. Peck	Rep	Robert A. Peck	Rep
28th	Keith Goodenough	Dem	Keith Goodenough	Dem
30th	Charles K. Scott	Rep	Charles K. Scott	Rep

== District 2 ==
=== Democratic primary ===
2000 Wyoming Senate District 2 Democratic primary
Party	Candidate	Votes	%
Democratic	Brian J. Beckstead	830	100.00%
Total votes		830	100.00%

=== Republican primary ===
2000 Wyoming Senate District 2 Republican primary
Party	Candidate	Votes	%
Republican	Jim Anderson	2,630	100.00%
Total votes		2,630	100.00%

=== General election ===
2000 Wyoming Senate District 2 general election
Party	Candidate	Votes	%
Republican	Jim Anderson	4,578	62.13%
Democratic	Brian J. Beckstead	2,791	37.87%
Total votes		7,369	100.00%

== District 4 ==
=== Democratic primary ===
2000 Wyoming Senate District 4 Democratic primary
Party	Candidate	Votes	%
Democratic	Ken Tuma	1,144	100.00%
Total votes		1,144	100.00%

=== Republican primary ===
2000 Wyoming Senate District 4 Republican primary
Party	Candidate	Votes	%
Republican	April Brimmer-Kunz (inc.)	2,331	100.00%
Total votes		2,331	100.00%

=== General election ===
2000 Wyoming Senate District 4 general election
Party	Candidate	Votes	%
Republican	April Brimmer-Kunz (inc.)	5,583	65.12%
Democratic	Ken Tuma	2,990	34.88%
Total votes		8,573	100.00%

== District 6 ==
=== Democratic primary ===
2000 Wyoming Senate District 6 Democratic primary
Party	Candidate	Votes	%
Democratic	Rich Cathcart (inc.)	907	100.00%
Total votes		907	100.00%

=== Republican primary ===
2000 Wyoming Senate District 6 Republican primary
Party	Candidate	Votes	%
Republican	Bill Moore	1,734	100.00%
Total votes		1,734	100.00%

=== General election ===
2000 Wyoming Senate District 6 general election
Party	Candidate	Votes	%
Democratic	Rich Cathcart (inc.)	4,363	57.05%
Republican	Bill Moore	3,285	42.95%
Total votes		7,648	100.00%

== District 8 ==
=== Democratic primary ===
2000 Wyoming Senate District 8 Democratic primary
Party	Candidate	Votes	%
Democratic	E. Jayne Mockler (inc.)	930	100.00%
Total votes		930	100.00%

=== Republican primary ===
No candidates qualified for the Republican primary election.

=== General election ===
2000 Wyoming Senate District 8 general election
Party	Candidate	Votes	%
Democratic	E. Jayne Mockler (inc.)	4,092	100.00%
Total votes		4,092	100.00%

== District 10 ==
=== Democratic primary ===
No candidates qualified for the Democratic primary election.

=== Republican primary ===
2000 Wyoming Senate District 10 Republican primary
Party	Candidate	Votes	%
Republican	Irene Devin (inc.)	1,180	71.73%
Republican	Nyla Murphy	465	28.27%
Total votes		1,645	100.00%

=== General election ===
2000 Wyoming Senate District 10 general election
Party	Candidate	Votes	%
Republican	Irene Devin (inc.)	4,190	56.94%
Democratic	Nyla Murphy	2,782	37.80%
Libertarian	Patrick O’Reilly	387	5.26%
Total votes		7,359	100.00%

== District 12 ==
=== Democratic primary ===
2000 Wyoming Senate District 12 Democratic primary
Party	Candidate	Votes	%
Democratic	Rae Lynn Job (inc.)	1,883	100.00%
Total votes		1,883	100.00%

=== Republican primary ===
2000 Wyoming Senate District 12 Republican primary
Party	Candidate	Votes	%
Republican	Clark Stith	1,022	100.00%
Total votes		1,022	100.00%

=== General election ===
2000 Wyoming Senate District 12 general election
Party	Candidate	Votes	%
Democratic	Rae Lynn Job (inc.)	2,985	55.57%
Republican	Clark Stith	2,387	44.43%
Total votes		5,372	100.00%

== District 14 ==
=== Democratic primary ===
2000 Wyoming Senate District 14 Democratic primary
Party	Candidate	Votes	%
Democratic	Mark O. Harris (inc.)	1,659	100.00%
Total votes		1,659	100.00%

=== Republican primary ===
No candidates qualified for the Republican primary election.

=== General election ===
2000 Wyoming Senate District 14 general election
Party	Candidate	Votes	%
Democratic	Mark O. Harris (inc.)	4,560	100.00%
Total votes		4,560	100.00%

== District 16 ==
=== Democratic primary ===
No candidates qualified for the Democratic primary election.

=== Republican primary ===
2000 Wyoming Senate District 16 Republican primary
Party	Candidate	Votes	%
Republican	Delaine Roberts (inc.)	2,597	100.00%
Total votes		2,597	100.00%

=== General election ===
2000 Wyoming Senate District 16 general election
Party	Candidate	Votes	%
Republican	Delaine Roberts (inc.)	7,221	100.00%
Total votes		7,221	100.00%

== District 18 ==
=== Democratic primary ===
No candidates qualified for the Democratic primary election.

=== Republican primary ===
2000 Wyoming Senate District 18 Republican primary
Party	Candidate	Votes	%
Republican	Hank Coe (inc.)	3,769	100.00%
Total votes		3,769	100.00%

=== General election ===
2000 Wyoming Senate District 18 general election
Party	Candidate	Votes	%
Republican	Hank Coe (inc.)	7,801	100.00%
Total votes		7,801	100.00%

== District 20 ==
=== Democratic primary ===
No candidates qualified for the Democratic primary election.

=== Republican primary ===
2000 Wyoming Senate District 20 Republican primary
Party	Candidate	Votes	%
Republican	Gerald Geis (inc.)	3,240	100.00%
Total votes		3,240	100.00%

=== General election ===
2000 Wyoming Senate District 20 general election
Party	Candidate	Votes	%
Republican	Gerald Geis (inc.)	5,972	100.00%
Total votes		5,972	100.00%

== District 22 ==
=== Democratic primary ===
No candidates qualified for the Democratic primary election.

=== Republican primary ===
2000 Wyoming Senate District 22 Republican primary
Party	Candidate	Votes	%
Republican	John Schiffer (inc.)	6,772	100.00%
Total votes		6,772	100.00%

=== General election ===
2000 Wyoming Senate District 22 general election
Party	Candidate	Votes	%
Republican	John Schiffer (inc.)	2,837	100.00%
Total votes		2,837	100.00%

== District 24 ==
=== Democratic primary ===
2000 Wyoming Senate District 24 Democratic primary
Party	Candidate	Votes	%
Democratic	James C. Calhoun	273	100.00%
Total votes		273	100.00%

=== Republican primary ===
2000 Wyoming Senate District 24 Republican primary
Party	Candidate	Votes	%
Republican	Dick Erb (inc.)	1,211	50.06%
Republican	Kim Sorensen	1,208	49.94%
Total votes		2,419	100.00%

=== General election ===
2000 Wyoming Senate District 24 general election
Party	Candidate	Votes	%
Republican	Dick Erb (inc.)	4,037	70.73%
Democratic	James C. Calhoun	1,671	29.27%
Total votes		5,708	100.00%

== District 26 ==
=== Democratic primary ===
No candidates qualified for the Democratic primary election.

=== Republican primary ===
2000 Wyoming Senate District 26 Republican primary
Party	Candidate	Votes	%
Republican	Robert A. Peck (inc.)	2,699	100.00%
Total votes		2,699	100.00%

=== General election ===
2000 Wyoming Senate District 26 general election
Party	Candidate	Votes	%
Republican	Robert A. Peck (inc.)	5,464	100.00%
Total votes		5,464	100.00%

== District 28 ==
=== Democratic primary ===
2000 Wyoming Senate District 28 Democratic primary
Party	Candidate	Votes	%
Democratic	Keith Goodenough (inc.)	918	100.00%
Total votes		918	100.00%

=== Republican primary ===
2000 Wyoming Senate District 28 Republican primary
Party	Candidate	Votes	%
Republican	Tom Walsh	1,564	100.00%
Total votes		1,564	100.00%

=== General election ===
2000 Wyoming Senate District 28 general election
Party	Candidate	Votes	%
Democratic	Keith Goodenough (inc.)	3,431	50.66%
Republican	Tom Walsh	3,341	49.34%
Total votes		6,772	100.00%

== District 30 ==
=== Democratic primary ===
2000 Wyoming Senate District 30 Democratic primary
Party	Candidate	Votes	%
Democratic	Larry D. Horton	912	100.00%
Total votes		912	100.00%

=== Republican primary ===
2000 Wyoming Senate District 30 Republican primary
Party	Candidate	Votes	%
Republican	Charles K. Scott (inc.)	1,714	100.00%
Total votes		1,714	100.00%

=== General election ===
2000 Wyoming Senate District 30 general election
Party	Candidate	Votes	%
Republican	Charles K. Scott (inc.)	4,072	34.86%
Democratic	Larry D. Horton	2,179	65.14%
Total votes		6,251	100.00%
