= 2026 United States House of Representatives election in Wyoming =

2026 United States House of Representatives election in Wyoming's at-large district
- November 3, 2026
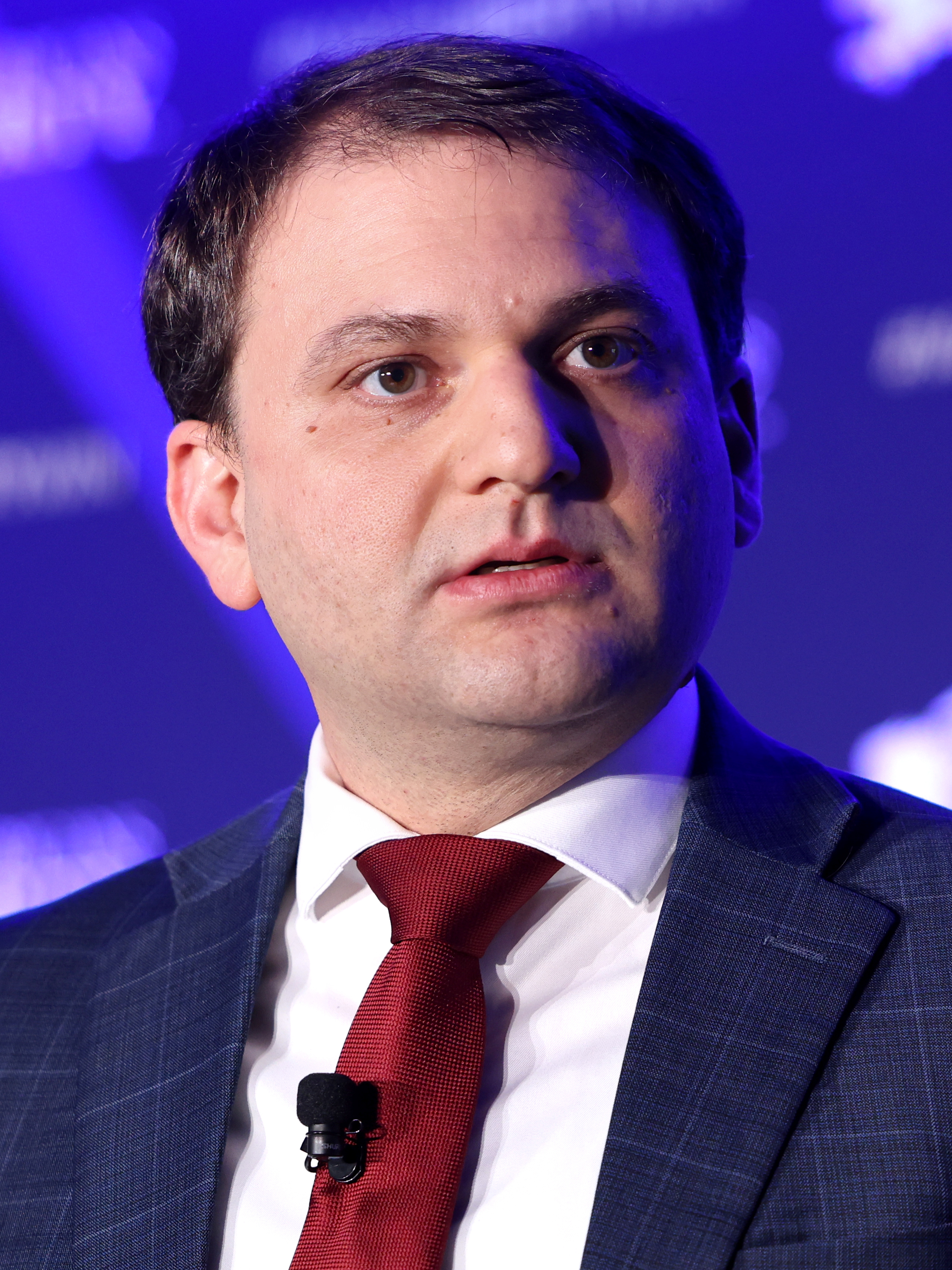

Nominee	Chuck Gray	Lisa Kinney	Shawn Johnson
Party	Republican	Democratic	Libertarian
Popular vote	99,906	61,689	13,667
Percentage	54.22%	33.48%	7.42%
- Gray: 40–50% 50–60% 60–70% 70–80% 80–90% 90–100% Kinney: 40–50% 50–60% 60–70% 70–80% 80–90% 90–100% No votes
U.S. Representative before election
Harriet Hageman
Republican
Elected U.S. Representative
Chuck Gray
Republican

The 2026 United States House of Representatives election in Wyoming took place on November 3, 2026, to elect the U.S. representative for Wyoming's at-large congressional district. The election coincided with other elections to the House of Representatives, elections to the United States Senate, and various state and local elections.

Incumbent Republican representative Harriet Hageman won re-election with 70.6% of the vote in 2024. In December 2025, she announced her intention to retire from the seat and instead run for Wyoming's open U.S. Senate seat.

Primary elections were held on August 18, 2026. State secretary of state Chuck Gray won a crowded Republican primary with 25% of the vote, while former state senator Lisa Kinney won the Democratic nomination handily. In the general election, Gray defeated Kinney with just 54% of the vote, the smallest vote share of any statewide Republican in Wyoming since 2008. Gray will become the first man to hold the seat since Craig L. Thomas in 1995.

== Republican primary ==
=== Candidates ===
==== Nominee ====
- Chuck Gray, Wyoming Secretary of State (2023–present) and candidate for this seat in 2022

==== Eliminated in primary ====
- Jillian Balow, former Virginia Superintendent of Public Instruction (2022–2023) and Wyoming Superintendent of Public Instruction (2015–2022)
- Bo Biteman, president of the Wyoming Senate (2025–present) from the 21st district (2019–present)
- Kevin Christensen, military veteran
- Richard Dodson, military veteran, entrepreneur
- Steve Friess, conservative activist and son of Foster Friess
- David Giralt, policy advisor to U.S. Senator Cynthia Lummis
- Keith Goodenough, former Democratic state senator (1995–2005), former Casper city councilor (2006–2014), and candidate for U.S. Senate in 2008
- Reid Rasner, businessman and candidate for U.S. Senate in 2024
- John Romero-Martinez, former state representative from the 44th district (2021–2023)

==== Withdrawn ====
- Frank Chapman, entrepreneur, rancher (remained on ballot)

==== Declined ====
- Harriet Hageman, incumbent U.S. representative (ran for U.S. Senate)
- Chip Neiman, speaker of the Wyoming House of Representatives (2025–present) from the 1st district (2021–present) (ran for state senate, endorsed Gray)

=== Endorsements ===
Steve Friess

Statewide officials

- Jim Geringer, 30th governor of Wyoming (1995–2003)
- Rita Meyer, former Wyoming State Auditor (2007–2011)

State legislators

- Eli Bebout, former President of the Wyoming Senate (2017–2019) from the 26th district (2007–2021)
- Dan Dockstader, former President of the Wyoming Senate (2021–2023) from the 16th district (2009–present)
- Dave Kinskey, former Vice President of the Wyoming Senate (2023–2025) from the 22nd district (2014–2025)
- Diemer True, former President of the Wyoming Senate (1991–1993) from the 18th district (1977–1993)
- Brian Boner, state senator from the 2nd district (2015–present)
- Jared Olsen, state senator from the 8th district (2025–present)
- Don Burkhart, former Speaker pro tempore of the Wyoming House of Representatives (2017–2019) from the 15th district (2011–2025)
- Bruce Hinchey, former speaker of the Wyoming House of Representatives (1997–1998) from the 36th district (1989–1999) and state senator from the 27th district (1999–2002)
- Tom Lubnau, former speaker of the Wyoming House of Representatives (2013–2015) from the 31st district (2004–2015)
- Rosie Berger, former state representative from the 51st district (2003–2017)
- Harlan Edmonds, former state representative from the 12th district (2015–2016)
- Jamie Flitner, former state representative from the 26th district (2017–2023)
- Ron Micheli, former state representative (1977–1992)
David Giralt

Executive branch officials

- Ryan Zinke, former secretary of the interior (2017–2019) and U.S. representative from MT-01 (2015–2017, 2023–present)

U.S. representatives

- Jack Bergman, MI-01 (2017–present)
- Jake Ellzey, TX-06 (2021–present)
- Rich McCormick, GA-07 (2023–present)
- Mike Rogers, AL-03 (2003-present)
- Pete Stauber, MN-08 (2019–present)

Individuals

- Ted Nugent, musician

Organizations

- With Honor Fund
Chuck Gray

State legislators

- Chip Neiman, speaker of the Wyoming House of Representatives (2025–present) from the 1st district (2021–present)
- Tony Locke, state representative from the 35th district (2023–present)
- Ann Lucas, state representative from the 43rd district (2025–present)
- Laura Pearson, state senator from the 14th district (2025–present)
- Ken Pendergraft, state representative from the 29th district (2023–present)
- Tomi Strock, state representative from the 6th district (2023–present)

Organizations

- Wyoming Freedom Caucus

State Parties

- Wyoming Republican Party

Italics indicate a withdrawn candidate

=== Fundraising ===
Campaign finance reports as of July 29, 2026
Candidate	Raised	Spent	Cash on hand
Jillian Balow (R)	$180,501 (Note: $125,000 was self funded)	$75,538	$104,963
Dennis Biteman (R)	$115,130	$86,533	$28,597
Kevin Christensen (R)	$35,952	$26,219	$9,732
Stephen Friess (R)	$3,282,745 (Note: $2,000,000 was self funded)	$2,485,619	$797,126
Frank Chapman (R)	$1,091,624 (Note: $1,060,768 was self funded)	$596,463	$495,161
David Giralt (R)	$213,244 (Note: $64,691 was self funded)	$176,700	$36,543
Chuck Gray (R)	$1,621,197 (Note: $1,147,000 was self funded)	$1,381,051	$240,146
Reid Rasner (R)	$2,327,646 (Note: $1,717,573 was self funded)	$2,260,947	$79,152
Source: Federal Election Commission

=== Polling ===
Poll source	Date(s) administered	Sample size (Note: Key: A – all adults RV – registered voters LV – likely voters V – unclear)	Margin of error	Eric Barlow	Jillian Balow	Bo Biteman	Kevin Christensen	Steve Friess	David Giralt	Chuck Gray	Reid Rasner	Other	Undecided
Fabrizio, Lee & Associates (R) (Note: Poll sponsored by Gray's campaign)	May 13–16, 2026	400 (LV)	± 4.9%	–	8%	7%	5%	10%	0%	21%	14%	1% (Note: Frank Chapman with 1%; John Romero-Martinez with 0%)	33%
Peak Insights (R) (Note: Poll sponsored by Rasner's campaign)	March 21–22, 2026	400 (LV)	± 5.0%	6%	–	5%	3%	–	2%	21%	24%	39%	
Peak Insights (R)	January 9, 2026	– (LV)	–	–	–	–	–	–	–	22%	16%	60% (Note: Gavin Solomon with 1%)	

Hypothetical polling

Poll source	Date(s) administered	Sample size	Margin of error	Chuck Gray	Eric Barlow	Bret Bien	Tara Nethercott	Other	Undecided
Fabrizio, Lee & Associates (R) (Note: Poll commissioned by Chuck Gray)	July 15–17, 2025	500 (LV)	± 4.0%	16%	6%	6%	7%	6%	58%

=== Debate ===
2026 United States House of Representatives election in Wyoming Republican primary debate
No.	Date	Host	Moderator	Link	Republican	Republican	Republican	Republican	Republican	Republican	Republican	Republican	Republican	Republican	Republican
Key: P Participant A Absent N Not invited I Invited W Withdrawn															
Key: P Participant A Absent N Not invited I Invited W Withdrawn					Jillian Balow	Bo Biteman	Frank Chapman	Kevin Christensen	Richard Dodson	Steve Friess	David Giralt	Keith Goodenough	Chuck Gray	Reid Rasner	John Romero-Martinez
1	Aug. 4, 2026	Sheridan County Chamber of Commerce; Cowboy State Daily, Sheridan College; The Sheridan Press, Wyoming PBS; Wyoming Public Media	Steve Peck	YouTube	P	P	W	P	P	P	P	A	P	P	A

=== Results ===
Primary results by county: Gray: 20–30%; 30–40%; Friess: 20–30%; Christensen: 20–30%; 30–40%

Primary results by precinct: Gray: 10–20%; 20–30%; 30–40%; 40–50%; 50–60%; 60–70%; Friess: 20–30%; 20–30%; 30–40%; 40–50%; 60–70%; 90–100%; Christensen: 20–30%; 30–40%; 40–50%; 50–60%; Balow: 10–20%; 20–30%; 30–40%; Rasner: 20–30%; 30–40%; Giralt: 30–40%; Biteman: 20–30%; 30–40%; 40–50%; Tie: 10–20%; 20–30%; 30–40%

Republican primary results
Party	Candidate	Votes	%
Republican	Chuck Gray	31,224	25.4
Republican	Steve Friess	25,059	20.4
Republican	Kevin Christensen	21,633	17.6
Republican	Jillian Balow	12,591	10.3
Republican	Reid Rasner	10,808	8.8
Republican	David Giralt	10,131	8.2
Republican	Bo Biteman	6,257	5.1
Republican	Keith Goodenough	3,343	2.7
Republican	Richard Dodson	1,777	1.4
Total votes		122,823	100.0

== Democratic primary ==
=== Candidates ===
==== Nominee ====
- Lisa F. Kinney, former minority leader of the Wyoming Senate

==== Eliminated in primary ====
- Elena del Real

=== Results ===
Primary results by county: Kinney: 70–80%; 80–90%

Democratic primary results
Party	Candidate	Votes	%
Democratic	Lisa F. Kinney	9,344	77.8
Democratic	Elena del Real	2,660	22.2
Total votes		12,004	100.0

== Independents and third parties ==
=== Candidates ===
==== Declared ====
- Jeffrey Haggit (Constitution)
- Shawn Johnson (Libertarian), former vice mayor of Casper

==== Filed paperwork ====
- Daniel Workman (Independent)

== General election ==
=== Predictions ===
Source	Ranking	As of
Decision Desk HQ	Safe R	July 14, 2026
The Cook Political Report	Solid R	June 25, 2025
Inside Elections	Likely R	October 15, 2026
Sabato's Crystal Ball	Solid R	July 10, 2025
Silver Bulletin	Solid R	August 23, 2026

=== Post-primary endorsements ===
Chuck Gray (R)

Executive branch officials

- Donald Trump, president of the United States (2017–2021, 2025–present)

U.S. representatives

- David McIntosh, former IN-2 (1995–2001)

Organizations

- Club for Growth PAC
Lisa Kinney (D)

U.S. representatives

- Brittany Pettersen, CO-7 (2023–present)

Statewide officials

- Mike Sullivan, former governor of Wyoming (1987–1995)

State legisalators

- Rex Arney, former state senator (Republican)
- Tom Jones, former state representative (Republican)
- Patti L. MacMillan, former state representative (Republican)

=== Fundraising ===
Campaign finance reports as of October 14, 2026
Candidate	Raised	Spent	Cash on hand
Chuck Gray (R)	$2,011,264	$1,850,089	$161,175
Lisa Kinney (D)	$99,131	$66,050	$33,081
Source: Federal Election Commission

=== Results ===
2026 Wyoming's at-large congressional district election
Party	Candidate	Votes	%	±%
Republican	Chuck Gray	99,906	54.22%	–16.39
Democratic	Lisa Kinney	61,689	33.48%	+10.24
Libertarian	Shawn Johnson	13,667	7.42%	+3.89
Constitution	Jeffrey Haggit	7,961	4.32%	+2.27
Write-in		1,031	0.56	–0.02
Total votes		184,254	100.0%	
Republican hold				

== Notes ==
Partisan clients
