= 2020 Wyoming Senate election =

2020 Wyoming State Senate election
- November 3, 2020

15 of the 30 seats in the Wyoming Senate 16 seats needed for a majority

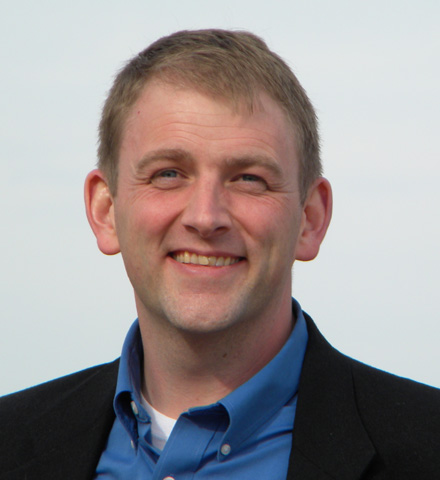
	Majority party	Minority party
Leader	Drew Perkins	Chris Rothfuss
Party	Republican	Democratic
Leader since	January 8, 2019	January 7, 2013
Leader's seat	29th district	9th district
Last election	27 seats, 63.37%	3 seats, 22.29%
Seats before	27	3
Seats won	28	2
Seat change	▲1	▼1
Popular vote	109,312	14,559
Percentage	86.86%	11.57%
Swing	▲23.19%	▼10.72%
- Results: Republican hold Republican gain No election
President of the Senate before election
Drew Perkins
Republican
Elected President of the Senate
Dan Dockstader
Republican

The 2020 Wyoming State Senate elections was held as part of the biennial elections in the United States. Wyoming voters elected state senators in 15 of the 30 state Senate districts. State senators serve four-year terms in the Wyoming State Senate.

Elections for the office of Wyoming State Senate took place in 2020. The general election was held on November 3, 2020. A primary was scheduled for August 18, 2020. The filing deadline was May 29, 2020.

== Retirements ==
Four incumbents did not run for re-election in 2020. Those incumbents are:

=== Republicans ===
1. District 10: Glenn Moniz: Retiring
2. District 18: Hank Coe: Retiring
3. District 20: Wyatt Agar: Retiring
4. District 26: Eli Bebout: Retiring

== Incumbents defeated ==
=== In primary elections ===
==== Republicans ====
One Republicans lost renomination.

1. District 24: Michael Von Flatern lost renomination to Troy McKeown.

=== In the general election ===
==== Democrats ====
1. District 12: Liisa Anselmi-Dalton lost to John Kolb.

== Predictions ==
Source	Ranking	As of
The Cook Political Report	Safe R	October 21, 2020

== Results summary ==
Summary of the November 3, 2020 Wyoming Senate election results
Party	Candidates	Votes		Seats				
Party	Candidates	No.	%	Before	Up	Won	After	+/–
Republican	15	109,312	86.86%	27	14	15	28	▲1
Democratic	5	14,559	11.57%	3	1	0	2	▼1
Libertarian	1	1,762	1.40%	0	0	0	0	Steady
Write-in		221	0.17%	0	0	0	0	Steady
Total		125,854	100.00%	30	15	15	30	Steady
Source: Wyoming Elections Results

Popular vote
Republican	86.86%
Democratic	11.57%
Other	1.57%

Senate seats
Republican	100.0%

== Close races ==
District	Winner	Margin
District 12	Republican (flip)	12.0%
District 10	Republican	12.5%

== Summary of results by State Senate district ==
State Senate district	Incumbent	Party	Elected Senator	Party
2nd	Brian Boner	Rep	Brian Boner	Rep
4th	Tara Nethercott	Rep	Tara Nethercott	Rep
6th	Anthony Bouchard	Rep	Anthony Bouchard	Rep
8th	Affie Ellis	Rep	Affie Ellis	Rep
10th	Glenn Moniz	Rep	Dan Furphy	Rep
12th	Liisa Anselmi-Dalton	Dem	John Kolb	Rep
14th	Fred Baldwin	Rep	Fred Baldwin	Rep
16th	Dan Dockstader	Rep	Dan Dockstader	Rep
18th	Hank Coe	Rep	Tim French	Rep
20th	Wyatt Agar	Rep	Edward Cooper	Rep
22nd	Dave Kinskey	Rep	Dave Kinskey	Rep
24th	Michael Von Flatern*	Rep	Troy McKeown	Rep
26th	Eli Bebout	Rep	Tim Salazar	Rep
28th	James Lee Anderson	Rep	James Lee Anderson	Rep
30th	Charles Scott	Rep	Charles Scott	Rep

== District 2 ==
=== Republican primary ===
Republican primary
Party	Candidate	Votes	%
Republican	Brian Boner (incumbent)	4,940	99.1%
Write-in		46	0.9%
Total votes		4,986	100.0%

=== General election ===
Wyoming's 2nd State Senate District general election, 2020
Party	Candidate	Votes	%
Republican	Brian Boner (incumbent)	9,372	100.0%
Total votes		9,372	100.0%
Republican hold			

== District 4 ==
=== Republican primary ===
Republican primary
Party	Candidate	Votes	%
Republican	Tara Nethercott (incumbent)	3,787	97.2%
Write-in		110	2.8%
Total votes		3,897	100.0%

=== General election ===
Wyoming's 4th State Senate District general election, 2020
Party	Candidate	Votes	%
Republican	Tara Nethercott (incumbent)	9,299	100.0%
Total votes		9,299	100.0%
Republican hold			

== District 6 ==
=== Republican primary ===
Republican primary
Party	Candidate	Votes	%
Republican	Anthony Bouchard (incumbent)	2,069	51.8%
Republican	Erin Johnson	1,906	47.7%
Write-in		20	0.5%
Total votes		3,995	100.0%

=== Democratic primary ===
Democratic primary
Party	Candidate	Votes	%
Democratic	Britney Wallesch	858	99.3%
Write-in		6	0.7%
Total votes		864	100.0%

=== General election ===
Wyoming's 6th State Senate District general election, 2020
Party	Candidate	Votes	%
Republican	Anthony Bouchard (incumbent)	6,879	64.7%
Democratic	Britney Wallesch	3,724	35.0%
Write-in		32	0.3%
Total votes		10,635	100.0%
Republican hold			

== District 8 ==
=== Republican primary ===
Republican primary
Party	Candidate	Votes	%
Republican	Affie Ellis (incumbent)	1,120	64.1%
Republican	Dan Young	623	35.7%
Write-in		4	0.2%
Total votes		1,747	100.0%

=== Democratic primary ===
Democratic primary
Party	Candidate	Votes	%
Democratic	James Byrd	912	99.3%
Write-in		6	0.7%
Total votes		918	100.0%

=== General election ===
Wyoming's 8th State Senate District general election, 2020
Party	Candidate	Votes	%
Republican	Affie Ellis (incumbent)	4,231	61.3%
Democratic	James Byrd	2,623	38.0%
Write-in		47	0.7%
Total votes		6,901	100.0%
Republican hold			

== District 10 ==
=== Republican primary ===
Republican primary
Party	Candidate	Votes	%
Republican	Dan Furphy	1,577	62.5%
Republican	Craig Malmstrom	934	37.0%
Write-in		11	0.4%
Total votes		2,522	100.0%

=== Democratic primary ===
Democratic primary
Party	Candidate	Votes	%
Democratic	Jackie Grimes	1,554	99.4%
Write-in		9	0.6%
Total votes		1,563	100.0%

=== General election ===
Wyoming's 10th State Senate District general election, 2020
Party	Candidate	Votes	%
Republican	Dan Furphy	5,593	56.0%
Democratic	Jackie Grimes	4,343	43.5%
Write-in		45	0.5%
Total votes		9,981	100.0%
Republican hold			

== District 12 ==
=== Democratic primary ===
Democratic primary
Party	Candidate	Votes	%
Democratic	Liisa Anselmi-Dalton (incumbent)	907	99.1%
Write-in		8	0.9%
Total votes		915	100.0%

=== Republican primary ===
Republican primary
Party	Candidate	Votes	%
Republican	John Kolb	1,254	92.2%
Write-in		106	7.8%
Total votes		1,360	100.0%

=== General election ===
Wyoming's 12th State Senate District general election, 2020
Party	Candidate	Votes	%
Republican	John Kolb	3,278	55.8%
Democratic	Liisa Anselmi-Dalton (incumbent)	2,576	43.8%
Write-in		24	0.4%
Total votes		5,878	100.0%
Republican gain from Democratic			

== District 14 ==
=== Republican primary ===
Republican primary
Party	Candidate	Votes	%
Republican	Fred Baldwin (incumbent)	1,866	46.1%
Republican	Lyle Williams	1,305	32.2%
Republican	Rex Rammell	866	21.4%
Write-in		15	0.4%
Total votes		4,052	100.0%

=== General election ===
Wyoming's 14th State Senate District general election, 2020
Party	Candidate	Votes	%
Republican	Fred Baldwin (incumbent)	7,779	100.0%
Total votes		7,779	100.0%
Republican hold			

== District 16 ==
=== Republican primary ===
Republican primary
Party	Candidate	Votes	%
Republican	Dan Dockstader (incumbent)	3,405	98.5%
Write-in		51	1.5%
Total votes		3,456	100.0%

=== General election ===
Wyoming's 16th State Senate District general election, 2020
Party	Candidate	Votes	%
Republican	Dan Dockstader (incumbent)	9,231	100.0%
Total votes		9,231	100.0%
Republican hold			

== District 18 ==
=== Republican primary ===
Republican primary
Party	Candidate	Votes	%
Republican	Tim French	2,177	41.7%
Republican	David Northrup	1,444	27.6%
Republican	Stefanie Bell	1,269	24.3%
Republican	Richard Jones	322	6.2%
Write-in		12	0.2%
Total votes		5,224	100.0%

=== General election ===
Wyoming's 18th State Senate District general election, 2020
Party	Candidate	Votes	%
Republican	Tim French	9,153	100.0%
Total votes		9,153	100.0%
Republican hold			

== District 20 ==
=== Republican primary ===
Republican primary
Party	Candidate	Votes	%
Republican	Edward Cooper	2,300	47.6%
Republican	Linda Weeks	2,084	43.1%
Republican	Roland Luehne	440	9.1%
Write-in		7	0.1%
Total votes		4,831	100.0%

=== Democratic primary ===
Democratic primary
Party	Candidate	Votes	%
Democratic	Theresa Livingston	418	99.3%
Write-in		3	0.7%
Total votes		421	100.0%

=== General election ===
Wyoming's 20th State Senate District general election, 2020
Party	Candidate	Votes	%
Republican	Edward Cooper	7,497	85.0%
Democratic	Theresa Livingston	1,293	14.7%
Write-in		26	0.3%
Total votes		8,816	100.0%
Republican hold			

== District 22 ==
=== Republican primary ===
Republican primary
Party	Candidate	Votes	%
Republican	Dave Kinskey (incumbent)	4,201	97.0%
Write-in		132	3.0%
Total votes		4,333	100.0%

=== General election ===
Wyoming's 22nd State Senate District general election, 2020
Party	Candidate	Votes	%
Republican	Dave Kinskey (incumbent)	8,516	100.0%
Total votes		8,516	100.0%
Republican hold			

== District 24 ==
=== Republican primary ===
Republican primary
Party	Candidate	Votes	%
Republican	Troy McKeown	2,374	63.4%
Republican	Michael Von Flatern (incumbent)	1,360	36.3%
Write-in		11	0.3%
Total votes		3,745	100.0%

=== General election ===
Wyoming's 24th State Senate District general election, 2020
Party	Candidate	Votes	%
Republican	Troy McKeown	8,516	100.0%
Total votes		8,516	100.0%
Republican hold			

== District 26 ==
=== Republican primary ===
Republican primary
Party	Candidate	Votes	%
Republican	Tim Salazar	2,883	62.3%
Republican	Michael Bailey	1,738	37.6%
Write-in		3	0.1%
Total votes		4,624	100.0%

=== General election ===
Wyoming's 26th State Senate District general election, 2020
Party	Candidate	Votes	%
Republican	Tim Salazar	7,790	100.0%
Total votes		7,790	100.0%
Republican hold			

== District 28 ==
=== Republican primary ===
Republican primary
Party	Candidate	Votes	%
Republican	James Lee Anderson (incumbent)	1,623	67.0%
Republican	Ryan Jackson	787	32.5%
Write-in		14	0.6%
Total votes		2,424	100.0%

=== General election ===
Wyoming's 28th State Senate District general election, 2020
Party	Candidate	Votes	%
Republican	James Lee Anderson (incumbent)	6,132	100.0%
Total votes		6,132	100.0%
Republican hold			

== District 30 ==
=== Republican primary ===
Republican primary
Party	Candidate	Votes	%
Republican	Charles Scott (incumbent)	1,740	57.7%
Republican	Charles Schoenwolf	1,269	42.0%
Write-in		9	0.3%
Total votes		3,018	100.0%

=== General election ===
Wyoming's 30th State Senate District general election, 2020
Party	Candidate	Votes	%
Republican	Charles Scott (incumbent)	6,046	77.0%
Libertarian	Wendy Degroot	1,762	22.4%
Write-in		47	0.6%
Total votes		7,855	100.0%
Republican hold			

== See also ==
- 2020 United States Senate election in Wyoming
- 2020 United States presidential election in Wyoming
- 2020 United States House of Representatives election in Wyoming
