= 2020 Wyoming elections =

The general election was held on November 3, 2020, to elect a member of the United States Senate to represent the State of Wyoming. This election was concurrent with the 2020 U.S. presidential election, as well as other elections to the United States Senate in other states, and elections to the United States House of Representatives and various state and local elections. The Democratic and Republican party primary election was held on August 18, 2020.

== President of the United States ==
The 2020 United States presidential election in Wyoming took place on Tuesday, November 3, 2020, as part of the 2020 United States presidential election in which all 50 states plus the District of Columbia participated. Wyoming voters chose electors to represent them in the Electoral College via a popular vote. The state of Wyoming has three electoral votes in the Electoral College, which were won by incumbent Republican president Donald Trump.

=== Statewide results ===
2020 United States presidential election in Wyoming
Party	Candidate	Votes	%
Republican	Donald Trump (incumbent)	193,559	69.94%
Democratic	Joe Biden	73,491	26.55%
Libertarian	Jo Jorgensen	5,768	2.08%
Independent	Brock Pierce	2,208	0.80%
Write-in		1,739	0.63%
Total votes		276,765	100.0%

== United States Class II Senate seat ==
The 2020 United States Senate election in Wyoming was held on November 3, 2020, to elect a member of the United States Senate to represent the State of Wyoming. This election was concurrent with the 2020 U.S. presidential election, as well as other elections to the United States Senate in other states, and elections to the United States House of Representatives and various state and local elections. Incumbent Republican Mike Enzi did not run for reelection. The Democratic and Republican party primary election was held on August 18, 2020.

=== Republican primary ===
Republican primary results
Party	Candidate	Votes	%
Republican	Cynthia Lummis	63,470	59.96%
Republican	Robert Short	13,469	12.72%
Republican	Bryan Miller	10,943	10.34%
Republican	Donna Rice	5,868	5.54%
Republican	Mark Armstrong	3,897	3.68%
Republican	Joshua Wheeler	3,760	3.55%
Republican	John Holtz	1,816	1.72%
Republican	Devon Cade	1,027	0.97%
Republican	Michael Kemler	985	0.93%
Republican	Star Roselli	627	0.59%
Total votes		105,862	100.0%

=== Democratic primary ===
Democratic primary results
Party	Candidate	Votes	%
Democratic	Merav Ben-David	9,585	40.59%
Democratic	Yana Ludwig	4,928	20.87%
Democratic	Nathan Wendt	4,213	17.84%
Democratic	Kenneth Casner	2,140	9.06%
Democratic	Rex Wilde	1,882	7.97%
Democratic	James DeBrine	865	3.66%
Total votes		23,613	100.00%

=== General election ===
United States Senate election in Wyoming, 2020
Party	Candidate	Votes	%	±%
Republican	Cynthia Lummis	198,100	72.85%	+0.66%
Democratic	Merav Ben-David	72,766	26.76%	+9.31%
Write-in		1,071	0.39%	+0.11%
Total votes		271,937	100.0%	
Republican hold				

== United States House of Representatives ==
The 2020 United States House of Representatives election in Wyoming was held on November 3, 2020, to elect the U.S. representative from Wyoming's at-large congressional district. The elections coincided with the 2020 U.S. presidential election, as well as other elections to the House of Representatives, elections to the United States Senate, and various state and local elections.

=== Republican primary ===
Republican primary results
Party	Candidate	Votes	%
Republican	Liz Cheney (incumbent)	78,853	73.45%
Republican	Blake Stanley	28,049	26.13%
Republican	Write-ins	454	0.42%
Total votes		107,356	100.0%

=== Democratic primary ===
Democratic primary results
Party	Candidate	Votes	%
Democratic	Lynnette Grey Bull	14,147	60.01%
Democratic	Carol Hafner	5,176	21.96%
Democratic	Carl Beach	4,107	17.42%
Democratic	Write-ins	144	0.61%
Total votes		23,574	100.0%

=== General election ===
Wyoming's at-large congressional district, 2020
Party	Candidate	Votes	%	±%
Republican	Liz Cheney (incumbent)	185,732	68.56%	+4.98%
Democratic	Lynnette Grey Bull	66,576	24.58%	−5.19%
Libertarian	Richard Brubaker	10,154	3.75%	+0.31%
Constitution	Jeff Haggit	7,905	2.92%	−0.10%
Write-in		525	0.19%	±0.00%
Total votes		270,892	100.0%	
Republican hold				

== State legislature ==
The state legislative elections resulted in a rightward shift in both the House and Senate.

=== Wyoming Senate ===
Of the 30 seats in the Wyoming Senate, 15 were up for election in 2020.

District	Representative	Party	Results	Candidates
2	Brian Boner	Republican	Incumbent re-elected	✓ Brian Boner (Republican)
4	Tara Nethercott	Republican	Incumbent re-elected	✓ Tara Nethercott (Republican)
6	Anthony Bouchard	Republican	Incumbent re-elected	✓ Anthony Bouchard (Republican); Britney Wallesch (Democratic)
8	Affie Ellis	Republican	Incumbent re-elected	✓ Affie Ellis (Republican); James Byrd (Democratic)
10	Glenn Moniz	Republican	Incumbent re-elected	✓ Dan Furphy (Republican); Jackie Grimes (Democratic)
12	Liisa Anselmi-Dalton	Democratic	Incumbent lost re-election. New member elected. Republican gain.	Liisa Anselmi-Dalton (Democratic); ✓ John Kolb (Republican)
14	Fred Baldwin	Republican	Incumbent re-elected	✓ Fred Baldwin (Republican)
16	Dan Dockstader	Republican	Incumbent re-elected	✓ Dan Dockstader (Republican)
18	Hank Coe	Republican	Incumbent retired New member elected Republican hold	✓ Tim French (Republican)
20	Wyatt Agar	Republican	Incumbent re-elected	✓ Edward Cooper (Republican); Theresa Livingston (Democratic)
22	Dave Kinskey	Republican	Incumbent re-elected	✓ Dave Kinskey (Republican)
24	Michael Von Flatern	Republican	Incumbent lost renomination New member elected Republican hold	✓ Troy McKeown (Republican)
26	Eli Bebout	Republican	Incumbent retired New member elected Republican hold	✓ Tim Salazar (Republican)
28	James Lee Anderson	Republican	Incumbent re-elected	✓ James Lee Anderson (Republican)
30	Charles Scott	Republican	Incumbent re-elected	✓ Charles Scott (Republican); Wendy Degroot (Libertarian)

=== Wyoming House of Representatives ===
All 60 seats in the Wyoming House of Representatives were up for election in 2020.

== Supreme Court ==
=== Boomgaarden's seat ===
General election, November 3, 2020
Party	Candidate	Votes	%
Nonpartisan	Lynne J. Boomgaarden (incumbent)		
Total votes			100.0%

=== Gray's seat ===
General election, November 3, 2020
Party	Candidate	Votes	%
Nonpartisan	Kari Jo Gray (incumbent)		
Total votes			100.0%
