= Wyoming's 4th State Senate district =

American legislative district

- Wyoming's 4th State Senate district as of 2022
Senator
Tara Nethercott; R–Cheyenne
- Demographics: 88% White; 1% Black; 7% Hispanic; 1% Asian; 1% Native American; 2% Multiracial
- Population (2022): 15,384

Wyoming's 4th State Senate district is one of 31 districts in the Wyoming Senate. The district encompasses part of Laramie County. It is represented by Republican Senator Tara Nethercott of Cheyenne.

In 1992, the state of Wyoming switched from electing state legislators by county to a district-based system.

== List of members representing the district ==
Representative	Party	Term	Note
April Brimmer-Kunz	Republican	1993 – 2005	Elected in 1992. Re-elected in 1996. Re-elected in 2000.
Tony Ross	Republican	2005 – 2017	Elected in 2004. Re-elected in 2008. Re-elected in 2012.
Tara Nethercott	Republican	2017 – present	Elected in 2016. Re-elected in 2020. Re-elected in 2024.

== Recent election results ==
=== 2008 ===
Senate district 4 general election
Party	Candidate	Votes	%
Republican	Tony Ross (incumbent)	8,116	98.44%
Write-ins		128	1.55%
Total votes		8,244	100.0%
Invalid or blank votes		1,991	
Republican hold			

=== 2012 ===
Senate district 4 general election
Party	Candidate	Votes	%
Republican	Tony Ross (incumbent)	7,555	98.71%
Write-ins		98	1.28%
Total votes		7,653	100.0%
Invalid or blank votes		2,019	
Republican hold			

=== 2016 ===
Senate district 4 general election
Party	Candidate	Votes	%
Republican	Tara Nethercott	5,867	60.24%
Democratic	Ken A. Esquibel	3,859	39.62%
Write-ins		12	0.12%
Total votes		9,738	100.0%
Invalid or blank votes		409	
Republican hold			

=== 2020 ===
Senate district 4 general election
Party	Candidate	Votes	%
Republican	Tara Nethercott (incumbent)	9,299	96.96%
Write-ins		291	3.03%
Total votes		9,590	100.0%
Invalid or blank votes		1,456	
Republican hold			

=== 2024 ===
2024 Wyoming Senate District 4 general election
Party	Candidate	Votes	%
Republican	Tara Nethercott (inc.)	8,255	96.41%
Write-in		307	3.59%
Valid ballots		8,562	87.69%
Invalid or blank votes		1,202	12.31%
Total votes		9,764	100.00%

== Historical district boundaries ==
Map	Description	Apportionment Plan	Notes
	Laramie County (part)	1992 Apportionment Plan	
	Laramie County (part)	2002 Apportionment Plan	
	Laramie County (part)	2012 Apportionment Plan	
