= Wyoming's 30th State Senate district =

American legislative district

- Wyoming's 30th State Senate district as of 2022
Senator
Charles Scott; R–Casper
- Demographics: 88% White; 8% Hispanic; 1% Hawaiian/Pacific Islander; 3% Multiracial
- Population (2022): 19,400

Wyoming's 30th State Senate district is one of 31 districts in the Wyoming Senate. The district encompasses part of Natrona County. It is represented by Republican Senator Charles Scott of Casper.

In 1992, the state of Wyoming switched from electing state legislators by county to a district-based system.

== List of members representing the district ==
Representative	Party	Term	Note
Charles Scott	Republican	1993 – present	Elected in 1992. Re-elected in 1996. Re-elected in 2000. Re-elected in 2004. Re-elected in 2008. Re-elected in 2012. Re-elected in 2016. Re-elected in 2020. Re-elected in 2024.

== Recent election results ==
=== 2008 ===
Senate district 30 general election
Party	Candidate	Votes	%
Republican	Charles Scott (incumbent)	6,438	97.51%
Write-ins		164	2.48%
Total votes		6,602	100.0%
Invalid or blank votes		1326	
Republican hold			

=== 2012 ===
Senate district 30 general election
Party	Candidate	Votes	%
Republican	Charles Scott (incumbent)	5,709	89.25%
Write-ins		687	10.74%
Total votes		6,396	100.0%
Invalid or blank votes		1,074	
Republican hold			

=== 2016 ===
Senate district 30 general election
Party	Candidate	Votes	%
Republican	Charles Scott (incumbent)	5,831	78.82%
Democratic	Robert Ford	1,521	20.56%
Write-ins		45	0.60%
Total votes		7,397	100.0%
Invalid or blank votes		370	
Republican hold			

=== 2020 ===
Senate district 30 general election
Party	Candidate	Votes	%
Republican	Charles Scott (incumbent)	6,046	76.97%
Libertarian	Wendy Degroot	1,762	22.43%
Write-ins		47	0.59%
Total votes		7,855	100.0%
Invalid or blank votes		456	
Republican hold			

=== 2024 ===
Senate district 30 general election
Party	Candidate	Votes	%
Republican	Charles Scott (incumbent)	6,406	96.78%
Write-ins		213	3.21%
Total votes		6,619	100.0%
Invalid or blank votes		1,254	
Republican hold			

== Historical district boundaries ==
Map	Description	Apportionment Plan	Notes
	Fremont County (part); Natrona County (part)	1992 Apportionment Plan	
	Natrona County (part)	2002 Apportionment Plan	
	Natrona County (part)	2012 Apportionment Plan	
