= Wyoming's 12th State Senate district =

American legislative district

- Wyoming's 12th State Senate district as of 2022
Senator
John Kolb; R–Rock Springs
- Demographics: 77% White; 2% Black; 16% Hispanic; 1% Asian; 2% Other; 2% Multiracial
- Population (2022): 17,186

Wyoming's 12th State Senate district is one of 31 districts in the Wyoming Senate. The district encompasses part of Sweetwater County. It is represented by Republican Senator John Kolb of Rock Springs.

In 1992, the state of Wyoming switched from electing state legislators by county to a district-based system.

== List of members representing the district ==
Representative	Party	Term	Note
Frank Prevedel	Democratic	1993 – 1997	Elected in 1992.
Rae Lynn Job	Democratic	1997 – 2008	Elected in 1996. Re-elected in 2000. Re-elected in 2004. Resigned in 2008.
Marty Martin	Democratic	2008 – 2013	Elected in 2008. Appointed in 2008.
Bernadine Craft	Democratic	2013 – 2017	Elected in 2012.
Liisa Anselmi-Dalton	Democratic	2017 – 2021	Elected in 2016.
John Kolb	Republican	2021 – present	Elected in 2020. Re-elected in 2024.

== Recent election results ==
=== 2008 ===
Senate district 12 general election
Party	Candidate	Votes	%
Democratic	Marty Martin	5,056	97.28%
Write-ins		141	2.71%
Total votes		5,197	100.0%
Invalid or blank votes		1,232	
Democratic hold			

=== 2012 ===
Senate district 12 general election
Party	Candidate	Votes	%
Democratic	Bernadine Craft	5,260	97.19%
Write-ins		152	2.80%
Total votes		5,412	100.0%
Invalid or blank votes		1,260	
Democratic hold			

=== 2016 ===
Senate district 12 general election
Party	Candidate	Votes	%
Democratic	Liisa Anselmi-Dalton	4,660	95.66%
Write-ins		211	4.33%
Total votes		4,871	100.0%
Invalid or blank votes		1,721	
Democratic hold			

=== 2020 ===
Senate district 12 general election
Party	Candidate	Votes	%
Republican	John Kolb	3,278	55.76%
Democratic	Liisa Anselmi-Dalton (incumbent)	2,576	43.82%
Write-ins		24	0.40%
Total votes		5,878	100.0%
Invalid or blank votes		179	
Republican gain from Democratic			

=== 2024 ===
Senate district 12 general election
Party	Candidate	Votes	%
Republican	John Kolb (incumbent)	4,359	69.46%
Democratic	Kenilynn S. Zanetti	1,873	29.84%
Write-ins		43	0.68%
Total votes		6,275	100.0%
Invalid or blank votes		318	
Republican hold			

== Historical district boundaries ==
Map	Description	Apportionment Plan	Notes
	Carbon County (part); Fremont County (part); Sweetwater County (part)	1992 Apportionment Plan	
	Fremont County (part); Sweetwater County (part)	2002 Apportionment Plan	
	Sweetwater County (part)	2012 Apportionment Plan	
