= Wyoming's 16th State Senate district =

American legislative district

- Wyoming's 16th State Senate district as of 2022
Senator
Dan Dockstader; R–Afton
- Demographics: 89% White; 8% Hispanic; 1% Asian; 2% Multiracial
- Population (2022) • Voting age: 18,044; 18

Wyoming's 16th State Senate district is one of 31 districts in the Wyoming Senate. The district encompasses parts of Lincoln and Teton counties. It is represented by Republican Senator Dan Dockstader.

In 1992, the state of Wyoming switched from electing state legislators by county to a district-based system.

== List of members representing the district ==
Representative	Party	Term	Note
Boyd L. Eddins	Republican	1993 – 1997	Elected in 1992.
Delaine Roberts	Republican	1997 – 2005	Elected in 1996. Re-elected in 2000.
Pat Aullman	Republican	2005 – January 5, 2009	Elected in 2004.
Dan Dockstader	Republican	January 5, 2009 – Present	Elected in 2008. Re-elected in 2012. Re-elected in 2016. Re-elected in 2020. Re-elected in 2024.

== Recent election results ==
=== Federal and statewide results ===
Office	Year	District	Statewide
President	2016	Trump 70.25% – Clinton 23.45%	Donald; Trump
President	2012	Romney 76.08% – Obama 22.18%	Mitt; Romney
Senate	2012	Barrasso 78.90% – Chesnut 19.09%	John; Barrasso
Representative	2012	Lummis 73.88% – Henrichsen 20.09%	Cynthia; Lummis

=== 2008 ===
Wyoming's 16th State Senate District General Election, 2008
Party	Candidate	Votes	%
Republican	Dan Dockstader	8,966	100.0%
Total votes		8,966	100.0%
Republican hold			

=== 2012 ===
Wyoming's 16th State Senate District General Election, 2012
Party	Candidate	Votes	%
Republican	Dan Dockstader (incumbent)	7,432	98.1%
Write-in		143	1.9%
Total votes		7,575	100.0%
Republican hold			

=== 2016 ===
Wyoming's Senate district 16 election, 2016
Party	Candidate	Votes	%
Republican	Dan Dockstader (incumbent)	7,208	74.94%
Democratic	Richard Kusaba	1,989	20.68%
Write-ins	Write-ins	28	0.29%
Over Votes	Other	2	0.02%
Under Votes	Other	392	4.08%
Total votes		9,619	100%
Republican hold			

=== 2020 ===
Wyoming's 16th State Senate District General Election, 2020
Party	Candidate	Votes	%
Republican	Dan Dockstader (incumbent)	8,830	
Total votes		9,231	100.0%
Republican hold			

=== 2024 ===
Wyoming's 16th State Senate District General Election, 2024
Party	Candidate	Votes	%
Republican	Dan Dockstader (incumbent)	8,830	96.99%
Write-ins		274	3.00%
Total votes		9,104	100.0%
Invalid or blank votes		1,915	
Republican hold			

== Historical district boundaries ==
Map	Description	Apportionment Plan	Notes
	Lincoln County; Sublette County (part)	1992 Apportionment Plan	
	Lincoln County (part); Sublette County (part); Teton County (part)	2002 Apportionment Plan	
	Lincoln County (part); Sublette County (part); Teton County (part)	2012 Apportionment Plan	
