= Wyoming's 24th State Senate district =

American legislative district

- Wyoming's 24th State Senate district as of 2022
Senator
Troy McKeown; R–Gillette
- Demographics: 88% White; 7% Hispanic; 1% Native American; 3% Multiracial
- Population (2022): 18,228

Wyoming's 24th State Senate district is one of 31 districts in the Wyoming Senate. The district encompasses part of Campbell County. It is represented by Republican Senator Troy McKeown of Gillette.

In 1992, the state of Wyoming switched from electing state legislators by county to a district-based system.

== List of members representing the district ==
Representative	Party	Term	Note
Mike Enzi	Republican	1993 – 1997	Elected in 1992.
Dick Erb	Republican	1997 – 2005	Elected in 1996. Re-elected in 2000.
Michael Von Flatern	Republican	2005 – 2021	Elected in 2004. Re-elected in 2008. Re-elected in 2012. Re-elected in 2016.
Troy McKeown	Republican	2021 – present	Elected in 2020. Re-elected in 2024.

== Recent election results ==
=== 2008 ===
Senate district 24 general election
Party	Candidate	Votes	%
Republican	Michael Von Flatern (incumbent)	6,014	98.55%
Write-ins		88	1.44%
Total votes		6,102	100.0%
Invalid or blank votes		996	
Republican hold			

=== 2012 ===
Senate district 24 general election
Party	Candidate	Votes	%
Republican	Michael Von Flatern (incumbent)	5,853	83.72%
Wyoming Country	Bradley Edward Kramer	1,112	15.90%
Write-ins		26	0.37%
Total votes		6,991	100.0%
Invalid or blank votes		512	
Republican hold			

=== 2016 ===
Senate district 24 general election
Party	Candidate	Votes	%
Republican	Michael Von Flatern (incumbent)	6,553	98.46%
Write-ins		102	1.53%
Total votes		6,655	100.0%
Invalid or blank votes		970	
Republican hold			

=== 2020 ===
Senate district 24 general election
Party	Candidate	Votes	%
Republican	Troy McKeown	6,822	95.10%
Write-ins		351	4.89%
Total votes		7,173	100.0%
Invalid or blank votes		1,041	
Republican hold			

=== 2024 ===
Senate district 24 general election
Party	Candidate	Votes	%
Republican	Troy McKeown (incumbent)	5,305	92.14%
Write-ins		452	7.85%
Total votes		5,757	100.0%
Invalid or blank votes		1,270	
Republican hold			

== Historical district boundaries ==
Map	Description	Apportionment Plan	Notes
	Campbell County (part)	1992 Apportionment Plan	
	Campbell County (part)	2002 Apportionment Plan	
	Campbell County (part)	2012 Apportionment Plan	
