= Senator Christensen =

Senator Christensen may refer to:

- Allen M. Christensen (born 1946), Utah State Senate
- Carl L. Christensen Jr. (1907–1976), California State Senate
- Earl Christensen (1919–2015), Wyoming State Senate
- Leland Christensen (born 1959), Wyoming State Senate
- Mark R. Christensen (born 1962), Nebraska State Senate
