= Wyoming's 8th State Senate district =

American legislative district

- Wyoming's 8th State Senate district as of 2022
Senator
Jared Olsen; R–Cheyenne
- Demographics: 71% White; 2% Black; 21% Hispanic; 2% Asian; 1% Native American; 3% Multiracial
- Population (2022): 18,037

Wyoming's 8th State Senate district is one of 31 districts in the Wyoming Senate. The district encompasses part of Laramie County. It is represented by Republican Senator Jared Olsen of Cheyenne.

In 1992, the state of Wyoming switched from electing state legislators by county to a district-based system.

== List of members representing the district ==
Representative	Party	Term	Note
James L. Applegate	Democratic	1993 – 1997	Elected in 1992.
E. Jayne Mockler	Democratic	1997 – 2009	Elected in 1996. Re-elected in 2000. Re-elected in 2004.
Floyd Esquibel	Democratic	2009 – 2017	Elected in 2008. Re-elected in 2012.
Affie Ellis	Republican	2017 – 2025	Elected in 2016. Elected in 2020.
Jared Olsen	Republican	2025 – present	Elected in 2024.

== Recent election results ==
=== 2008 ===
Senate district 8 general election
Party	Candidate	Votes	%
Democratic	Floyd Esquibel	4,848	97.46%
Write-ins		126	2.53%
Total votes		4,974	100.0%
Invalid or blank votes		1,548	
Democratic hold			

=== 2012 ===
Senate district 8 general election
Party	Candidate	Votes	%
Democratic	Floyd Esquibel (incumbent)	2,963	52.26%
Republican	Curtis Bryan Albrecht	2,690	47.45%
Write-ins		16	0.28%
Total votes		5,669	100.0%
Invalid or blank votes		339	
Democratic hold			

=== 2016 ===
Senate district 8 general election
Party	Candidate	Votes	%
Republican	Affie Ellis	3,638	60.66%
Democratic	Floyd Esquibel (incumbent)	2,346	39.11%
Write-ins		13	0.21%
Total votes		5,997	100.0%
Invalid or blank votes		285	
Republican gain from Democratic			

=== 2020 ===
Senate district 8 general election
Party	Candidate	Votes	%
Republican	Affie Ellis (incumbent)	4,231	61.30%
Democratic	James W. Byrd	2,623	38.00%
Write-ins		47	0.68%
Total votes		6,901	100.0%
Invalid or blank votes		112	
Republican hold			

=== 2024 ===
2024 Wyoming Senate District 8 general election
Party	Candidate	Votes	%
Republican	Jared Olsen	3,444	57.91%
Democratic	Marguerite Herman	2,464	41.43%
Write-in		39	0.66%
Valid ballots		5,947	98.09%
Invalid or blank votes		116	1.91%
Total votes		6,063	100.00%

== Historical district boundaries ==
Map	Description	Apportionment Plan	Notes
	Laramie County (part)	1992 Apportionment Plan	
	Laramie County (part)	2002 Apportionment Plan	
	Laramie County (part)	2012 Apportionment Plan	
