= Wyoming's 2nd State Senate district =

American legislative district

- Wyoming's 2nd State Senate district as of 2022
Senator
Brian Boner; R–Douglas
- Demographics: 86% White; 1% Black; 10% Hispanic; 3% Multiracial
- Population (2022) • Voting age: 17,894; 18

Wyoming's 2nd State Senate district is one of 31 districts in the Wyoming Senate. The district encompasses Converse County, as well as part of Natrona County. It is represented by Republican Senator Brian Boner.

In 1992, the state of Wyoming switched from electing state legislators by county to a district-based system.

== List of members representing the district ==
Representative	Party	Term	Note
Jim Twiford	Republican	1993 – 2001	Elected in 1992. Re-elected in 1996.
Jim Anderson	Republican	2001 – March 3, 2015	Elected in 2000. Re-elected in 2004. Re-elected in 2008. Re-elected in 2012. Resigned in 2015.
Brian Boner	Republican	March 19, 2015 – Present	Appointed in 2015. Re-elected in 2016. Re-elected in 2020. Re-elected in 2024.

== Recent election results ==
=== Federal and statewide results ===
Office	Year	District	Statewide
President	2016	Trump 81.29% – Clinton 12.63%	Donald; Trump
President	2012	Romney 75.68% – Obama 21.48%	Mitt; Romney
Senate	2012	Barrasso 81.33% – Chesnut 15.86%	John; Barrasso
Representative	2012	Lummis 73.92% – Henrichsen 18.33%	Cynthia; Lummis

=== 2008 ===
Wyoming's 2nd State Senate District General Election, 2008
Party	Candidate	Votes	%
Republican	Jim Anderson (incumbent)	6,395	74.29%
Democratic	Jason Wright	2,213	25.71%
Total votes		8,608	100.0%
Republican hold			

=== 2012 ===
Wyoming's 2nd State Senate District General Election, 2012
Party	Candidate	Votes	%
Republican	Jim Anderson (incumbent)	8,359	98.4%
Write-in		133	1.6%
Total votes		8,492	100.0%
Republican hold			

=== 2016 ===
Wyoming's Senate district 2 election, 2016
Party	Candidate	Votes	%
Republican	Brian Boner (incumbent)	8,187	82.03%
Democratic	William Cullen III	1,377	13.80%
Write-ins	Write-ins	28	0.28%
Over Votes	Other	1	>0.01%
Under Votes	Other	388	3.89%
Total votes		9,981	100%
Republican hold			

=== 2020 ===
Wyoming's 2nd State Senate District General Election, 2020
Party	Candidate	Votes	%
Republican	Brian Boner (incumbent)	9,372	100.0%
Total votes		9,372	100.0%
Republican hold			

=== 2024 ===
2024 Wyoming Senate District 2 general election
Party	Candidate	Votes	%
Republican	Brian Boner (inc.)	7,712	98.24%
Write-in		138	1.76%
Valid ballots		7,850	87.17%
Invalid or blank votes		1,155	12.83%
Total votes		9,005	100.00%

== Historical district boundaries ==
Map	Description	Apportionment Plan	Notes
	Converse County (part); Goshen County (part); Platte County (part)	1992 Apportionment Plan	
	Converse County (part); Platte County (part)	2002 Apportionment Plan	
	Platte County; Converse County (part)	2012 Apportionment Plan	
