= Pat Aullman =

American politician

Patricia Aullman

Member of the Wyoming Senate from the 16th district
- In office 2005–2008
- Preceded by: Delaine Roberts
- Succeeded by: Dan Dockstader

Personal details
- Born: 1950 or 1951 (age 74–75) San Diego, California
- Party: Republican

Patricia Aullman (born 1950 or 1951 in San Diego, California) is an American politician. She served one term in the Wyoming State Senate, representing the 16th district as a Republican.

== Career ==
Prior to entering politics, Aullman worked as a house painter and emergency medical technician. She began her campaign over concerns about rising property taxes. She was elected in the November 2004 elections, defeating Democratic challenger Jerry Bosch. During her time in the State Senate, she served on the Senate Labor, Health & Social Services Committee, the Select Water Committee, and the Select Committee on Mental Health and Substance Abuse (among others), becoming chair of the latter in 2007.

Aullman chose not to run for re-election in 2008, stating she could not afford the expenses associated with being a state legislator, such as travel costs and the time away from her job.

== Electoral history ==
2004 Wyoming State Senate general election, District 16
Party	Candidate	Votes	%
Republican	Pat Aullman	6,699	68.50
Democratic	Jerry Bosch	3,081	31.50
Total votes		9,780	100.0
Republican hold			
