= 1996 United States House of Representatives election in Wyoming =

1996 United States House of Representatives election in Wyoming's at-large district
- November 5, 1996
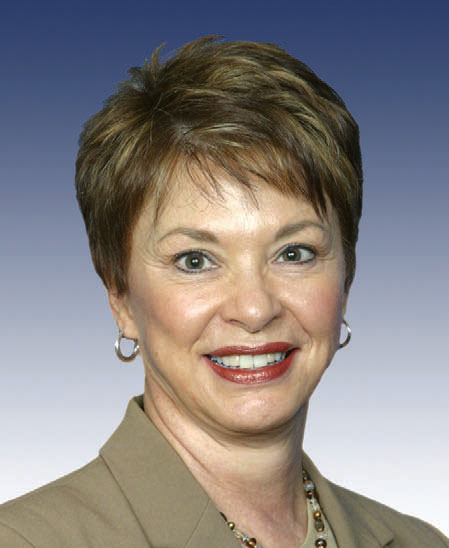

Nominee	Barbara Cubin	Pete Maxfield
Party	Republican	Democratic
Popular vote	116,004	85,724
Percentage	55.24%	40.82%
- County results Cubin: 40–50% 50–60% 60–70% 70–80% Maxfield: 50–60%
U.S. Representative before election
Barbara Cubin
Republican
Elected U.S. Representative
Barbara Cubin
Republican

The 1996 United States House of Representatives election in Wyoming was held on November 5, 1996. Freshman Republican Congresswoman Barbara Cubin ran for re-election to a second term. She was opposed in the general election by Democratic nominee Pete Maxfield, a State Senator and law professor at the University of Wyoming School of Law. Cubin ultimately defeated Maxfield by a wide margin, winning 55 percent of the vote to Maxfield's 41 percent.

== Democratic primary ==
=== Candidates ===
- Pete Maxfield, State Senator and law professor at the University of Wyoming School of Law
- Worth Christie, insurance company owner

=== Results ===
Democratic primary results
Party	Candidate	Votes	%
Democratic	Pete Maxfield	26,379	72.31%
Democratic	Worth Christie	10,103	27.69%
Total votes		36,482	100.00%

== Republican primary ==
=== Candidates ===
- Barbara Cubin, incumbent U.S. Representative

=== Results ===
Republican primary results
Party	Candidate	Votes	%
Republican	Barbara Cubin (inc.)	66,235	100.00%
Total votes		66,235	100.00%

== General election ==
=== Results ===
1996 Wyoming's at-large congressional district general election results
Party	Candidate	Votes	%
Republican	Barbara Cubin (inc.)	116,004	55.24%
Democratic	Pete Maxfield	85,724	40.82%
Libertarian	Dave Dawson	8,255	3.93%
Total votes		209,983	100.00%
Republican hold			
