= Wyoming Country Party =

Wyoming state party

- Abbreviation: CTRY
- Chairman: Don Wills
- Membership (2012): 69
- Ideology: Conservatism
- Colors: Green

Website
- wycountryparty.org (defunct)

The Wyoming County Party was a political party active in the state of Wyoming in the early 2010s. It was formed by former Libertarian Party members who were unhappy with the state party's electoral chances and its policies. It supported eliminating the state's sales tax and rejecting federal education funding. It stood several candidates in the 2012 Wyoming elections for both state and federal office. The party pledged not to run any candidates against "favorable" Republican incumbents in 2012, as to not split the vote. It was certified as a state political party in May 2012, but lost its recognition after the 2012 elections. The party chairman was Don Wills, former chair of the Wyoming Libertarian Party. The party website has been defunct since 2018.

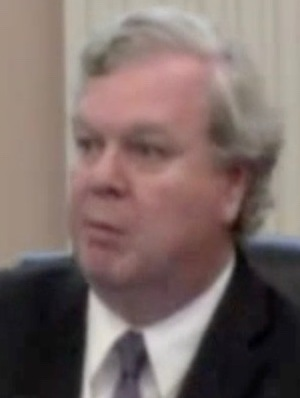
Don Wills, former WYLP chair, was the Country Party's U.S. House nominee in 2012 and its chairman.

== Platform ==
The Country Party outlined four "fundamental principles" for the 2014 election:

- Reduce the control exerted by the federal government over Wyoming and its citizens;
- Reduce government expenditures;
- Reduce taxes;
- Reduce regulations.

== Election results ==
The Country Party planned to recruit upwards of twenty candidates in 2012, but only six ended up standing for election. In 2014, the party pledged to recruit candidates for all seventy-five state legislative races, but never ended up standing a single candidate. Don Wills stood as an independent candidate in the 2014 gubernatorial election, as by then the Country Party lost recognition.

=== 2012 ===
Race	Candidate	%	Votes	Place	Ref
U.S. Senate	Joel Otto	2.52%	6,176	3rd of 3	
U.S. House	Don Wills	1.56%	3,775	5th of 5	
Senate 6	William R. Hill	20.89%	1,663	2nd of 2	
Senate 14	John Vincent Love	12.58%	978	2nd of 2	
Senate 24	Bradley Edward Kramer	15.91%	1,112	2nd of 2	
House 9	Perry Helgeson	5.17%	194	4th of 4	

=== 2014 ===
Race	Candidate	%	Votes	Place	Ref
Governor	Don Wills (as independent)	5.89%	9,895	3rd of 4	

== See also ==
- Republican In Name Only
