= Wyoming's 10th State Senate district =

American legislative district

- Wyoming's 10th State Senate district as of 2022
Senator
| Gary Crum; R–Laramie |
- Demographics: 82% White; 1% Black; 10% Hispanic; 3% Asian; 5% Multiracial
- Population (2022): 19,230

Wyoming's 10th State Senate district is one of 31 districts in the Wyoming Senate. The district encompasses part of Albany County. It is represented by Republican Senator Gary Crum of Laramie.

In 1992, the state of Wyoming switched from electing state legislators by county to a district-based system.

== List of members representing the district ==
| Representative | Party | Term | Note |
|---|---|---|---|
| Pete Maxfield | Democratic | 1993 – 1997 | Elected in 1992. |
| Irene Devin | Republican | 1997 – 2005 | Elected in 1996. Re-elected in 2000. |
| Phil Nicholas | Republican | 2005 – 2017 | Elected in 2004. Re-elected in 2008. Re-elected in 2012. |
| Glenn Moniz | Republican | 2017 – 2021 | Elected in 2016. |
| Dan Furphy | Republican | 2021 – 2025 | Elected in 2020. |
| Gary Crum | Republican | 2025 – present | Elected in 2024. |

== Recent election results ==
=== 2008 ===
Senate district 10 general election
| Party | Candidate | Votes | % |
|---|---|---|---|
| Republican | Phil Nicholas (incumbent) | 5,024 | 58.59% |
| Democratic | Neil Harrison | 3,524 | 41.10% |
| Write-ins | | 26 | 0.30% |
| Total votes | | 8,574 | 100.0% |
| Invalid or blank votes | | 575 | |
| Republican hold | | | |

=== 2012 ===
Senate district 10 general election
| Party | Candidate | Votes | % |
|---|---|---|---|
| Republican | Phil Nicholas (incumbent) | 6,058 | 90.74% |
| Write-ins | | 618 | 9.25% |
| Total votes | | 6,676 | 100.0% |
| Invalid or blank votes | | 2,020 | |
| Republican hold | | | |

=== 2016 ===
Senate district 10 general election
| Party | Candidate | Votes | % |
|---|---|---|---|
| Republican | Glenn Moniz | 5,133 | 57.27% |
| Democratic | Narina Nunez | 3,815 | 42.56% |
| Write-ins | | 14 | 0.15% |
| Total votes | | 8,962 | 100.0% |
| Invalid or blank votes | | 369 | |
| Republican hold | | | |

=== 2020 ===
Senate district 10 general election
| Party | Candidate | Votes | % |
|---|---|---|---|
| Republican | Dan Furphy | 5,593 | 56.03% |
| Democratic | Jackie Grimes | 4,343 | 43.51% |
| Write-ins | | 45 | 0.45% |
| Total votes | | 9,981 | 100.0% |
| Invalid or blank votes | | 381 | |
| Republican hold | | | |

=== 2024 ===
2024 Wyoming Senate District 10 general election
| Party | Candidate | Votes | % |
|---|---|---|---|
| Republican | Gary Crum | 6,331 | 64.83% |
| Democratic | Mike Selmer | 3,405 | 34.87% |
| Write-in | | 30 | 0.31% |
| Valid ballots | | 9,766 | 97.87% |
| Invalid or blank votes | | 210 | 2.13% |
| Total votes | | 9,979 | 100.00% |

== Historical district boundaries ==
| Map | Description | Apportionment Plan | Notes |
|---|---|---|---|
| | Albany County (part) | 1992 Apportionment Plan | |
| | Albany County (part) | 2002 Apportionment Plan | |
| | Albany County (part) | 2012 Apportionment Plan | |
