= Wyoming's 26th State Senate district =

American legislative district

- Wyoming's 26th State Senate district as of 2022
Senator
Tim Salazar; R–Riverton
- Demographics: 78% White; 9% Hispanic; 1% Asian; 6% Native American; 5% Multiracial
- Population (2022): 19,494

Wyoming's 26th State Senate district is one of 31 districts in the Wyoming Senate. The district encompasses part of Fremont County. It is represented by Republican Senator Tim Salazar of Riverton.

In 1992, the state of Wyoming switched from electing state legislators by county to a district-based system.

== List of members representing the district ==
Representative	Party	Term	Note
Bob Peck	Republican	1993 – 2007	Elected in 1992. Re-elected in 1996. Re-elected in 2000. Re-elected in 2004. Died in 2007.
Eli Bebout	Republican	2007 – 2021	Appointed in 2007. Elected in 2008. Re-elected in 2012. Re-elected in 2016.
Tim Salazar	Republican	2021 – present	Elected in 2020. Re-elected in 2024.

== Recent election results ==
=== 2008 ===
Senate district 26 general election
Party	Candidate	Votes	%
Republican	Eli Bebout (incumbent)	7,043	98.36%
Write-ins		117	1.63%
Total votes		7,160	100.0%
Invalid or blank votes		1,084	
Republican hold			

=== 2012 ===
Senate district 26 general election
Party	Candidate	Votes	%
Republican	Eli Bebout (incumbent)	7,457	98.32%
Write-ins		127	1.67%
Total votes		7,584	100.0%
Invalid or blank votes		999	
Republican hold			

=== 2016 ===
Senate district 26 general election
Party	Candidate	Votes	%
Republican	Eli Bebout (incumbent)	6,461	76.13%
Democratic	Chesie Lee	1,979	23.32%
Write-ins		46	0.54%
Total votes		8,486	100.0%
Invalid or blank votes		270	
Republican hold			

=== 2020 ===
Senate district 26 general election
Party	Candidate	Votes	%
Republican	Tim Salazar	7,790	97.12%
Write-ins		231	2.87%
Total votes		8,021	100.0%
Invalid or blank votes		1,001	
Republican hold			

=== 2024 ===
Senate district 26 general election
Party	Candidate	Votes	%
Republican	Tim Salazar (incumbent)	7,266	97.00%
Write-ins		224	2.99%
Total votes		7,490	100.0%
Invalid or blank votes		1,309	
Republican hold			

== Historical district boundaries ==
Map	Description	Apportionment Plan	Notes
	Fremont County (part)	1992 Apportionment Plan	
	Fremont County (part)	2002 Apportionment Plan	
	Fremont County (part)	2012 Apportionment Plan	
