= Wyoming's 18th State Senate district =

American legislative district

- Wyoming's 18th State Senate district as of 2022
Senator
Tim French; R–Powell
- Demographics: 90% White; 5% Hispanic; 2% Other; 3% Multiracial
- Population (2022): 18,537

Wyoming's 18th State Senate district is one of 31 districts in the Wyoming Senate. The district encompasses part of Park County. It is represented by Republican Senator Tim French of Powell.

In 1992, the state of Wyoming switched from electing state legislators by county to a district-based system.

== List of members representing the district ==
Representative	Party	Term	Note
Hank Coe	Republican	1993 – 2021	Elected in 1992. Re-elected in 1996. Re-elected in 2000. Re-elected in 2004. Re-elected in 2008. Re-elected in 2012. Re-elected in 2016.
Tim French	Republican	2021 – present	Elected in 2020. Re-elected in 2024.

== Recent election results ==
=== 2008 ===
Senate district 18 general election
Party	Candidate	Votes	%
Republican	Hank Coe (incumbent)	8,173	96.97%
Write-ins		255	3.0%
Total votes		8,428	100.0%
Invalid or blank votes		1,873	
Republican hold			

=== 2012 ===
Senate district 18 general election
Party	Candidate	Votes	%
Republican	Hank Coe (incumbent)	6,249	71.37%
Write-ins		2,506	28.62%
Total votes		8,755	100.0%
Invalid or blank votes		1,106	
Republican hold			

=== 2016 ===
Senate district 18 general election
Party	Candidate	Votes	%
Republican	Hank Coe (incumbent)	5,682	56.82%
Independent	Cindy Baldwin	4,256	42.56%
Write-ins		61	0.61%
Total votes		9,999	100.0%
Invalid or blank votes		481	
Republican hold			

=== 2020 ===
Senate district 18 general election
Party	Candidate	Votes	%
Republican	Tim French	9,153	94.76%
Write-ins		506	5.23%
Total votes		9,659	100.0%
Invalid or blank votes		1,795	
Republican hold			

=== 2024 ===
Senate district 18 general election
Party	Candidate	Votes	%
Republican	Tim French (incumbent)	8,568	94.43%
Write-ins		505	5.56%
Total votes		9,073	100.0%
Invalid or blank votes		1,856	
Republican hold			

== Historical district boundaries ==
Map	Description	Apportionment Plan	Notes
	Park County (part)	1992 Apportionment Plan	
	Park County (part)	2002 Apportionment Plan	
	Park County (part)	2012 Apportionment Plan	
