= Tim French =

American politician

Member of the Wyoming Senate from the 18th district
- Incumbent
- Assumed office January 4, 2021
- Preceded by: Hank Coe

Personal details
- Born: Cody, Wyoming, U.S.
- Party: Republican
- Spouse: Becky
- Children: 2
- Profession: Farmer

Tim French is an American politician and a Republican member of the Wyoming Senate, representing District 18 since January 4, 2021.

== Early life ==
French was born in Cody, Wyoming, to Dorothy and Lawrence Lyle French.

== Career ==
French is a member of both the Agriculture, State and Public Lands & Water Resources Committee and the Senate Judiciary Committee. He served on Park County's commission for 18 years before becoming a state representative. During French's time as a county commissioner, he improved the information and technologies department of the county and helped establish a building for the county's grounds department. French is also a farmer.

== Political viewpoints ==
French states that he is "pro-life, pro-second amendment, and pro-property rights". He supports the coal industry in the United States.

== Personal life ==
French married Becky. He has two children.
