= Delaine Roberts =

American politician

Member of the Wyoming Senate from the 16th district
- In office January 14, 1997 – January 11, 2005
- Preceded by: Boyd L. Eddins
- Succeeded by: Pat Aullman

Personal details
- Born: January 15, 1933 Afton, Wyoming
- Died: December 7, 2016 (aged 83) Afton, Wyoming
- Party: Republican

Delaine Roberts (January 15, 1933 – December 7, 2016) was an American politician who served in the Wyoming Senate from the 16th district from 1997 to 2005.

He died on December 7, 2016, in Afton, Wyoming, at age 83.
