= Chuck Townsend =

American politician

Member of New Hampshire House of Representatives for Grafton 11
- In office 2008–2016

Personal details
- Party: Democratic
- Education: Dartmouth College
- Alma mater: Johns Hopkins University; Brown University

Charles "Chuck" Townsend is an American politician. He was a member of the New Hampshire House of Representatives representing Grafton 11th district from 2008 to 2016.
