= Earl Christensen =

American politician (1919–2015)

President of the Wyoming State Senate
- In office 1969–1971
- Preceded by: Dick Jones
- Succeeded by: Pete Madsen

Member of the Wyoming State Senate
- In office 1959–1984

Personal details
- Born: December 20, 1919 Newcastle, Wyoming, U.S.
- Died: January 31, 2015 (aged 95) Newcastle, Wyoming, U.S.
- Party: Republican
- Occupation: rancher

John Earl Christensen (December 20, 1919 – January 31, 2015) was an American politician in the state of Wyoming. He served in the Wyoming State Senate as a member of the Republican Party. He served as President of the Wyoming Senate from 1969 to 1971. He attended the University of Wyoming and was a rancher.
