= Irene Devin =

Wyoming politician

Member of the Wyoming Senate from the 10th district
- In office 1997–2004
- Preceded by: Pete Maxfield
- Succeeded by: Phil Nicholas

Member of the Wyoming House of Representatives from the 14th district
- In office 1993–1996
- Preceded by: Constituency established
- Succeeded by: Phil Nicholas

Irene Devin is an American Republican politician from Albany County, Wyoming. She served in the Wyoming House of Representatives from 1993 to 1996 and the Wyoming Senate from 1997 to 2004.
