= 2012 United States House of Representatives election in Wyoming =

2012 United States House of Representatives election in Wyoming's at-large district
- November 6, 2012
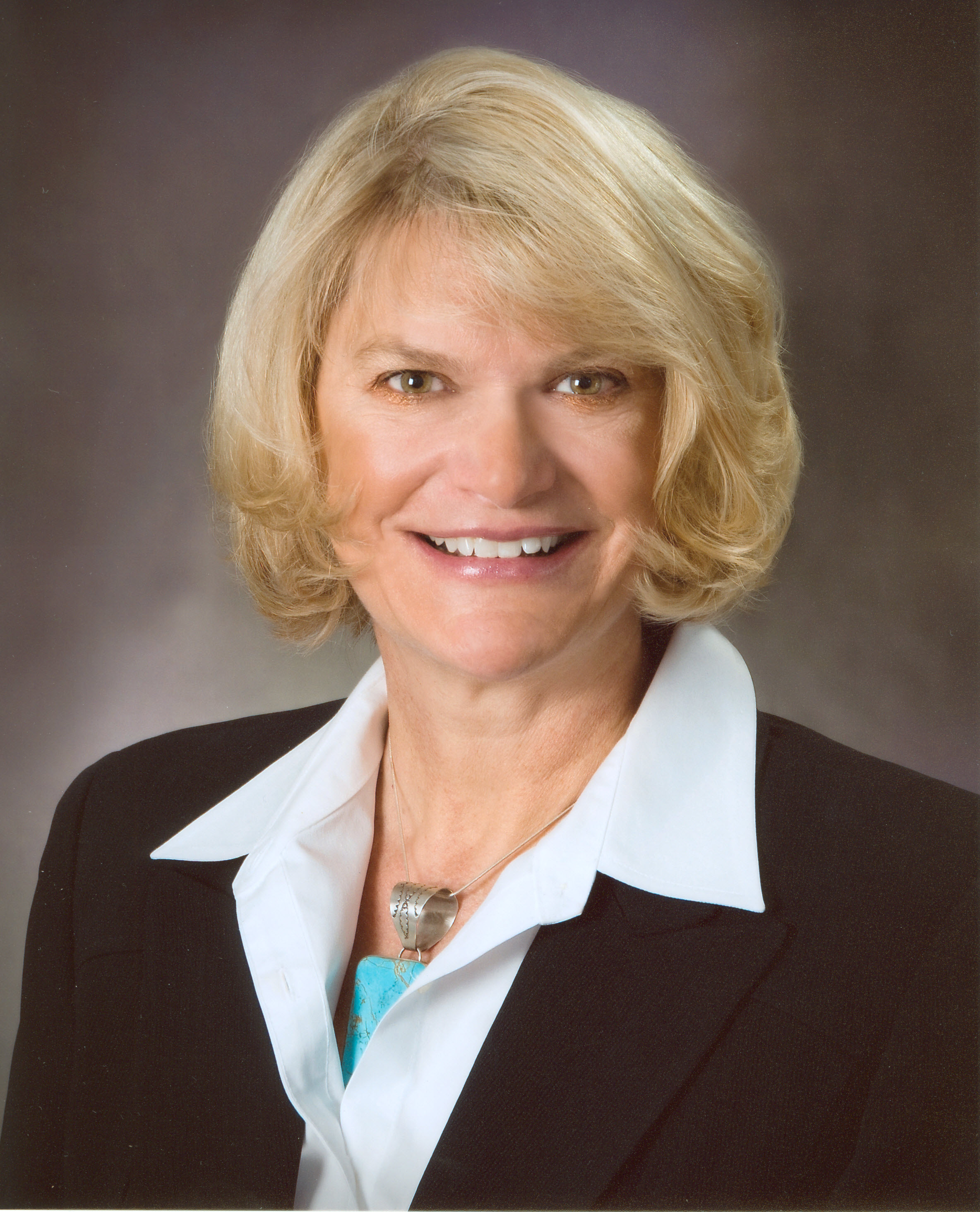

Nominee	Cynthia Lummis	Chris Henrichsen
Party	Republican	Democratic
Popular vote	166,452	57,573
Percentage	68.89%	23.83%
- County results Lummis: 50–60% 60–70% 70–80% 80–90% Henrichsen: 40–50%
U.S. Representative before election
Cynthia Lummis
Republican
Elected U.S. Representative
Cynthia Lummis
Republican

The 2012 United States House of Representatives election in Wyoming was held on Tuesday, November 6, 2012, and re-elected Cynthia Lummis as the U.S. representative from the state's at-large congressional district. The election coincided with the elections of other federal and state offices, including a quadrennial presidential election and an election to the U.S. Senate. A primary election was held on August 21, 2012.

== Republican primary ==
=== Candidates ===
==== Nominee ====
- Cynthia Lummis, incumbent U.S. Representative

=== Primary results ===
Republican primary results
Party	Candidate	Votes	%
Republican	Cynthia Lummis (incumbent)	73,153	98.1
Republican	Write-in	1,393	1.9
Total votes		74,546	100.0

== Democratic primary ==
=== Candidates ===
==== Nominee ====
- Chris Henrichsen, political science professor at Casper College

=== Primary results ===
Democratic primary results
Party	Candidate	Votes	%
Democratic	Chris Henrichsen	16,259	98.9
Democratic	Write-in	177	1.1
Total votes		16,436	100.0

== Minor parties ==
=== Candidates ===
- Richard Brubaker (L), truck driver
- Daniel Cummings (Constitution), physician
- Don Wills (Wyoming Country), software engineer and former chairman of the Libertarian Party of Wyoming

== General election ==
=== Predictions ===
Source	Ranking	As of
The Cook Political Report	Safe R	November 5, 2012
Rothenberg	Safe R	November 2, 2012
Roll Call	Safe R	November 4, 2012
Sabato's Crystal Ball	Safe R	November 5, 2012
NY Times	Safe R	November 4, 2012
RCP	Safe R	November 4, 2012
The Hill	Safe R	November 4, 2012

=== Results ===
Wyoming's at-large congressional district, 2012
Party	Candidate	Votes	%	±%
Republican	Cynthia Lummis (incumbent)	166,452	68.89%	−1.53%
Democratic	Chris Henrichsen	57,573	23.83%	−0.65%
Libertarian	Richard Brubaker	8,442	3.49%	−1.46%
Constitution	Daniel Clyde Cummings	4,963	2.05%	N/A
Wyoming Country	Don Wills	3,775	1.56%	N/A
n/a	Write-ins	416	0.17%	+0.02%
Total votes		'241,621'	'100.0%'	N/A
Republican hold				
