= Pete Maxfield =

American politician

Member of the Wyoming Senate from the 10th district
- In office 1993–1997

Personal details
- Born: Peter C. Maxfield Scottsbluff, Nebraska
- Party: Democratic
- Education: Regis University (BA); Harvard Law School (LLM); Sturm College of Law (JD)
- Occupation: Attorney, Professor

Pete Maxfield is a former American politician and lawyer in the state of Wyoming. He served in the Wyoming Senate from 1993 to 1997. He was a member of the Democratic party. He was also a professor and Dean of the University of Wyoming College of Law.
