= Wyatt Agar =

American politician (born 1981)

Member of the Wyoming Senate from the 20th district
- In office January 10, 2017 – January 4, 2021
- Preceded by: Gerald Geis
- Succeeded by: Ed Cooper

Personal details
- Born: October 2, 1981 (age 44) Weiser, Idaho, U.S.
- Party: Republican
- Spouse: Joey Agar
- Children: 3
- Profession: Politician, rancher, partner, deacon

Wyatt Agar (born October 2, 1981) is an American politician, rancher, partner, and deacon from Thermopolis, Wyoming, who served in the Wyoming Senate from 2017 to 2021, representing the 20th senate district of Wyoming as a Republican in the 64th and 65th Wyoming Legislatures.

== Early life ==
Agar was born in Weiser, Idaho, on October 2, 1981.

== Career ==
Agar is a rancher and partner in the Durbin Creek Ranch outside of Thermopolis. He moved to Wyoming in 2009 for agricultural opportunities.

Agar served as both vice chairman and secretary of the Hot Springs County Republican Party. Additionally, he serves as a deacon at the First Baptist Church of Thermopolis.

=== 2016 election ===
When incumbent Republican senator Gerald Geis announced his retirement, Agar announced his candidacy for the seat.

Agar defeated Ron Harvey and Bob Bayuk in the Republican primary with 56% of the vote. He then defeated Democrat Mary Jane Norskog in the general election with 81% of the vote.

In 2017, Agar served on the following committees:

- Corporations, Elections and Political Subdivisions
- Transportation, Highways and Military Affairs
- Joint Corporations, Elections and Political Subdivisions
- Joint Transportation, Highways and Military Affairs

Between 2019 and 2020, Agar was assigned to the Joint Appropriations Committee and the Senate Appropriations Committee. He also served on the Select Committee on Capital Financing and Investments and the Select Water Committee.

Agar's term began on January 10, 2017, (Note: According to Ballotpedia, Agar's term began on January 2, 2017.) and concluded on January 4, 2021. (Note: According to the Wyoming Legislature, Agar served from 2017 to 2020.) He did not run for re-election in 2020.

In October 2023, Agar was elected president of the American Hereford Association.

== Political positions ==
During his 2016 campaign, Agar promoted the fostering of fiscal responsibility, defending the first and second amendments of the United States Constitution, and supporting small businesses and capitalism.

Agar received a 100% rating from the National Federation of Independent Business between 2017 and 2018.

== Personal life ==
Agar has a wife and three children. He currently resides in Thermopolis.

Agar is a founding member of the Future Cattle Producers of Wyoming.

Agar is a Christian.

== Electoral history ==
2016 Wyoming Senate District 20 general election
Party	Candidate	Votes	%
Republican	Wyatt Agar	6,893	81.39
Democratic	Mary Jane Norskog	1,546	18.25
Write-in		30	0.35
Total votes		8,469	100.0
Republican hold			

Republican primary results
Party	Candidate	Votes	%
Republican	Wyatt Agar	2,508	56.46
Republican	Ron Harvey	1,328	29.90
Republican	Bob Bayuk	599	13.48
Write-in		7	0.16
Total votes		4,442	100.0

== Notes ==
Wyoming Senate
Preceded by Gerald Geis	Member of the Wyoming Senate from the 20th district 2017–2021	Succeeded by Ed Cooper
