= Tony Ross (politician) =

American politician (born 1953)

Member of the Wyoming Senate from the 4th district
- In office January 11, 2005 – January 10, 2017
- Preceded by: April Brimmer-Kunz
- Succeeded by: Tara Nethercott

Member of the Wyoming House of Representatives from the 7th district
- In office November 1995 – January 2005
- Preceded by: Ace Baty
- Succeeded by: Doug Samuelson

Personal details
- Born: February 5, 1953 (age 73) Cheyenne, Wyoming, U.S.
- Party: Republican
- Spouse: Sandy Ross
- Children: 2
- Occupation: Attorney

Tony Ross is a former Republican member of the Wyoming Senate for the 4th district, encompassing Laramie County.

== Biography ==
Tony Ross was born on February 5, 1953, in Cheyenne, Wyoming. He received a Bachelor of Science from the University of Puget Sound and a J.D. from the University of Wyoming College of Law.

He served in the Wyoming House of Representatives, representing the 7th district from 1995 to 2004. He was initially appointed to the state House in November 1995 by the Laramie County Commission following the death Representative Ace Baty.

In 2005, he was elected to the Wyoming Senate. He served as the Senate Majority Floor Leader in the 2011 to 2012 term and Senate Vice President in the 2009 to 2010 term.

He is married to Sandy Ross, and they have two children. He is a Christian.
