= Boyd L. Eddins =

American politician

Boyd Eddins

President of the Wyoming State Senate
- In office 1995–1997
- Preceded by: Jerry B. Dixon
- Succeeded by: Robert Grieve

Member of the Wyoming State Senate
- In office 1983–?

Personal details
- Born: August 4, 1933 (age 93) Thayne, Wyoming, United States
- Party: Republican
- Occupation: rancher

Boyd Lavell Eddins (born August 4, 1933) was an American politician in the state of Wyoming. He served in the Wyoming State Senate as a member of the Republican Party.

He served as President of the Wyoming Senate from 1995 to 1997. He attended Weber State University and the University of Utah and was a rancher.
