= Gerald Geis =

American politician (1933–2022)

Member of the Wyoming Senate from the 20th district
- In office 1975–1986
- In office January 11, 1993 – January 10, 2017
- Succeeded by: Wyatt Agar

Personal details
- Born: August 31, 1933 Ten Sleep, Wyoming, U.S.
- Died: November 2, 2022 (aged 89) Loveland, Colorado, U.S.
- Party: Republican
- Spouse: Irma
- Parent: Nick Geis (father)

Gerald Eugene Geis (August 31, 1933 – November 2, 2022) was an American politician who served as a Republican member of the Wyoming Senate, representing the 20th district from 1975 to 1986 and from 1993 until his retirement in 2017.

== Early life ==
Geis was born August 31, 1933, in a cabin near Ten Sleep, Wyoming. He moved to Worland in 1944 and graduated from Worland High School in 1951.

== Career ==
Geis worked in road construction and hauling livestock and was first asked to enter politics in 1974 whilst attending the Wyoming Truckers Convention. In 1976 he helped create Wyoming's senior citizen centers. He ran for Wyoming Secretary of State in 1986 but was defeated in the primary by 62 votes.

Geis was reappointed to the Senate in 1993. In 2007, he sponsored a bill that, if it had passed, would have voided out of state same-sex marriages from being recognized in Wyoming. In 2015, Geis voted against the Wyoming Food Freedom Act in committee, which allowed for the sale and consumption of homemade foods. In 2016, he voted against expanding Medicaid. Geis retired in 2017, with Wyatt Agar being elected to his former seat.

== Personal life and death ==
Geis was married to Irma, and together they had two children. He was Catholic. In 2005, he was inducted into the Wyoming Agriculture Hall of Fame.

Geis died on November 2, 2022, at the age of 89, in Loveland, Colorado.

== Political experience ==
- Senator, Wyoming State Senate, 1993–2017 (appointed 1993)
- Senator, Wyoming State Senate, 1975–1986 (Senate President 1985–1986; Majority Floor Leader 1983–1984; Senate Vice President 1983–1984)
- Member, Worland City Council

== Committees ==
Geis served eight years on the Appropriations Committee, serving as its president in 1981, and he served as chairman for the Select Water Committee. He also served as the chair of the Agriculture, State and Public Lands and Water Resources Committee, and as a member of the Select Federal Natural Resource Management Committee.
