= 2016 Wyoming Senate election =

- November 8, 2016

15 seats from the Wyoming Senate
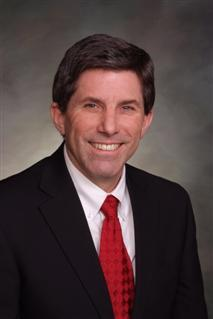

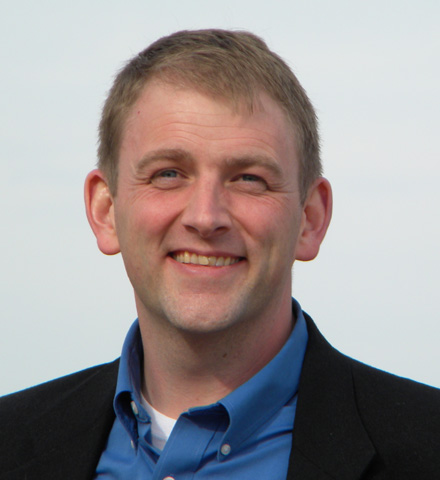
	Majority party	Minority party
Leader	Phil Nicholas	Chris Rothfuss
Party	Republican	Democratic
Leader's seat	10th district	9th district
Seats before	26	4
Seats after	27	3
Seat change	▲1	▼1
Popular vote	85,881	28,717
Percentage	64.70%	21.63%
- Results: Republican gain Democratic hold Republican hold No election
President pro tempore before election
Phil Nicholas
Republican
President pro tempore-designate
Phil Nicholas
Republican

The 2016 Wyoming Senate election were held on November 8, 2016, with the primary election on August 16, 2016. Voters in the 15 districts of the Wyoming Senate elected their representatives. The elections coincided with the elections for other offices, including for U.S. President and the state assembly.

== Overview ==
Wyoming State Senate elections, 2016 General election — November 8, 2016
Party	Votes	Percentage	Not up	Contested	Before	After	+/–
Republican	85,881	64.70%	13	13	26	27	▲1
Democratic	28,717	21.63%	4	2	4	3	▼1
Independent	8,570	6.46%	0	2	0	0	Steady
Write-ins	894	0.67%	0	15	0	0	Steady
Overvote	41	0.03%	0	15	0	0	Steady
Undervote	8,639	6.51%	0	15	0	0	Steady

== Predictions ==
Source	Ranking	As of
Governing	Safe R	October 12, 2016

== Results ==
=== District 2 ===
Wyoming's Senate district 2 election, 2016
Party	Candidate	Votes	%
Republican	Brian Boner (incumbent)	8,187	82.03%
Democratic	William Cullen III	1,377	13.80%
Write-ins	Write-ins	28	0.28%
Over Votes	Other	1	>0.01%
Under Votes	Other	388	3.89%
Total votes		9,981	100%

=== District 4 ===
Wyoming's Senate district 4 election, 2016
Party	Candidate	Votes	%
Republican	Tara Nethercott	5,867	57.82%
Democratic	Ken A. Esquibel	3,859	38.03%
Write-ins	Write-ins	12	0.12%
Over Votes	Other	1	negligible
Under Votes	Other	408	4.02%
Total votes		10,147	100%

=== District 6 ===
Wyoming's Senate district 6 election, 2016
Party	Candidate	Votes	%
Republican	Anthony Bouchard	4,670	49.02%
Independent	Kym Zwonitzer	4,314	45.28%
Write-ins	Write-ins	18	0.19%
Over Votes	Other	1	>0.1%
Under Votes	Other	524	5.50%
Total votes		9,527	100%

=== District 8 ===
Wyoming's Senate district 8 election, 2016
Party	Candidate	Votes	%
Republican	Affie Ellis	3,638	57.91%
Democratic	Floyd Esquibel (incumbent)	2,346	37.34%
Write-ins	Write-ins	13	0.21%
Over Votes	Other	0	0.0%
Under Votes	Other	285	4.53%
Total votes		6,282	100%

=== District 10 ===
Wyoming's Senate district 10 election, 2016
Party	Candidate	Votes	%
Republican	Glenn Moniz	5,133	55.01%
Democratic	Narina Nunez	3,815	40.89%
Write-ins	Write-ins	14	0.15%
Over Votes	Other	2	0.02%
Under Votes	Other	367	3.93%
Total votes		9,331	100%

=== District 12 ===
Wyoming's Senate district 12 election, 2016
Party	Candidate	Votes	%
Democratic	Liisa Anselmi-Dalton	4,660	70.69%
Write-ins	Write-ins	211	3.20%
Over Votes	Other	3	0.05%
Under Votes	Other	1,718	26.06%
Total votes		6,592	100%

=== District 14 ===
Wyoming's Senate district 14 election, 2016
Party	Candidate	Votes	%
Republican	Fred Baldwin	6,939	80.31%
Democratic	Charlotte Sedey	1,237	14.32%
Write-ins	Write-ins	17	0.20%
Over Votes	Other	2	0.02%
Under Votes	Other	445	5.15%
Total votes		8,640	100%

=== District 16 ===
Wyoming's Senate district 16 election, 2016
Party	Candidate	Votes	%
Republican	Dan Dockstader (incumbent)	7,208	74.94%
Democratic	Richard Kusaba	1,989	20.68%
Write-ins	Write-ins	28	0.29%
Over Votes	Other	2	0.02%
Under Votes	Other	392	4.08%
Total votes		9,619	100%

=== District 18 ===
Wyoming's Senate district 18 election, 2016
Party	Candidate	Votes	%
Republican	Hank Coe (incumbent)	5,682	54.22%
Democratic	Cindy Baldwin	4,256	40.61%
Write-ins	Write-ins	61	0.58%
Over Votes	Other	4	0.04%
Under Votes	Other	477	4.55%
Total votes		10,480	100%

=== District 20 ===
Wyoming's Senate district 20 election, 2016
Party	Candidate	Votes	%
Republican	Wyatt Agar	6,893	78.38%
Democratic	Mary Jane Norskog	1,546	17.58%
Write-ins	Write-ins	30	0.34%
Over Votes	Other	4	0.05%
Under Votes	Other	321	3.65%
Total votes		8,794	100%

=== District 22 ===
Wyoming's Senate district 22 election, 2016
Party	Candidate	Votes	%
Republican	Dave Kinskey (incumbent)	7,603	82.70%
Write-ins	Write-ins	247	2.69%
Over Votes	Other	0	0.0%
Under Votes	Other	1,344	14.62%
Total votes		9,194	100%

=== District 24 ===
Wyoming's Senate district 24 election, 2016
Party	Candidate	Votes	%
Republican	Michael Von Flatern (incumbent)	6,553	85.94%
Write-ins	Write-ins	102	1.34%
Over Votes	Other	2	0.03%
Under Votes	Other	968	12.70%
Total votes		7,625	100%

=== District 26 ===
Wyoming's Senate district 26 election, 2016
Party	Candidate	Votes	%
Republican	Eli Bebout	6,461	73.79%
Democratic	Chesie Lee	1,979	22.60%
Write-ins	Write-ins	46	0.53%
Over Votes	Other	1	0.01%
Under Votes	Other	269	3.07%
Total votes		8,756	100%

=== District 28 ===
Wyoming's Senate district 28 election, 2016
Party	Candidate	Votes	%
Republican	James Lee Anderson (incumbent)	5,216	67.59%
Democratic	Kimberly Holloway	2,111	27.36%
Write-ins	Write-ins	22	0.29%
Over Votes	Other	2	0.03%
Under Votes	Other	366	4.74%
Total votes		7,717	100%

=== District 30 ===
Wyoming's Senate district 30 election, 2016
Party	Candidate	Votes	%
Republican	Charles Scott (incumbent)	5,831	75.07%
Democratic	Robert Ford	1,521	19.58%
Write-ins	Write-ins	45	0.58%
Over Votes	Other	3	0.04%
Under Votes	Other	367	4.73%
Total votes		7,767	100%
