= April Brimmer-Kunz =

Wyoming politician

Member of the Wyoming Senate from the 4th district
- In office 1993–2004
- Preceded by: Constituency established
- Succeeded by: Tony Ross

Member of the Wyoming House of Representatives from the Laramie County district
- In office 1985–1992

Personal details
- Party: Republican

April Brimmer-Kunz is an American Republican politician from Cheyenne, Wyoming. She represented the Laramie County district in the Wyoming House of Representatives from 1985 to 1992 and the 4th district in the Wyoming Senate from 1993 to 2004. She was the first woman to serve as president of the Wyoming Senate from 2003 to 2004.
