= Rae Lynn Job =

American politician (born 1948)

Member of the Wyoming Senate from the 12th district
- In office 1997 – November 2008
- Preceded by: Frank Prevedel
- Succeeded by: Marty Martin

Personal details
- Born: May 2, 1948 (age 78) Rock Springs, Wyoming, U.S.
- Party: Democratic
- Spouse: Divorced
- Education: University of Wyoming
- Profession: Educator

Rae Lynn Job (born May 2, 1948) is a former Democratic member of the Wyoming Senate, representing the 12th district from 1997 until 2008. During her final term she served as the Minority Whip.

She lost re-election in 2008. She resigned shortly thereafter.
