= Tara Nethercott =

American politician

Majority Leader of the Wyoming Senate
- Incumbent
- Assumed office January 14, 2025
- Preceded by: Larry S. Hicks

Member of the Wyoming Senate from the 4th district
- Incumbent
- Assumed office January 10, 2017
- Preceded by: Tony Ross

Personal details
- Born: Wyoming, U.S.
- Party: Republican
- Education: University of Wyoming (BA, JD)

Tara Nethercott is an American politician and a Republican member of the Wyoming Senate representing District 4 since January 10, 2017.

== Career ==
Nethercott is a practicing attorney in Cheyenne.

== Elections ==
=== 2016 ===
When incumbent Republican Senator Tony Ross announced his retirement, Nethercott announced her candidacy for the seat. Nethercott defeated David Pope and Bill Weaver in the Republican primary with 46% of the vote. She defeated Democratic State Representative Ken Esquibel in the general election with 60% of the vote.

Wyoming Senate
Preceded by Larry S. Hicks	Majority Leader of the Wyoming Senate; 2025–present	Incumbent
