= Jim Anderson (American politician) =

American politician

Member of the Wyoming Senate from the 2nd district
- In office 2001 – March 3, 2015
- Preceded by: Jim Twiford
- Succeeded by: Brian Boner

Member of the Wyoming House of Representatives from the 6th district
- In office 1997–2000
- Preceded by: Frank N. Moore
- Succeeded by: Dave Edwards

Personal details
- Born: March 17, 1943 (age 83) Douglas, Wyoming, U.S.
- Party: Republican
- Education: Chadron State College

Jim Anderson (born March 17, 1943) is an American politician who served as a member of the Wyoming Senate from the 2nd district, which included Converse County and Platte County.

== Early life and education ==
Jim Anderson was born on March 17, 1943, in Douglas, Wyoming. He graduated from Chadron State College in Chadron, Nebraska, and did some postgraduate work at the University of Wyoming.

== Career ==
He served as a member of the Wyoming House of Representatives representing the 6th district from 1997 to 2000. From 2001 until his resignation on March 3, 2015, he served as a member of the Wyoming Senate. He served as President of the Wyoming Senate. He has stated that education is "the biggest social issue." He is opposed to gambling. In 2010, he sponsored a bill of 'cowboy ethics' after reading James Owen's book, Code of the West, about applying these principles to business.

He is a member of the Rotary International, the Glenrock Chamber of Commerce, the National Rifle Association of America, Moose International. He serves on the Board of Directors of the Mining Associates of Wyoming. He is also a member of the executive committee of the Council of State Governments.

== Personal life ==
He lived in Glenrock, Wyoming. He is married with two children and ten grandchildren. He is a Protestant.
