= Brian Boner =

American politician (born 1984)

Member of the Wyoming Senate from the 2nd district
- Incumbent
- Assumed office March 19, 2015
- Preceded by: Jim Anderson

Personal details
- Born: December 10, 1984 (age 41) Douglas, Wyoming, U.S.
- Party: Republican
- Spouse: Nicole Boner
- Children: 3
- Education: University of Wyoming; University of Nebraska–Lincoln
- Profession: Farmer

Brian Boner (born December 10, 1984) is an American politician and a Republican member of the Wyoming State Senate, representing the 2nd district since March 19, 2015.

== Elections ==
=== 2014 ===
Incumbent Republican State Senator Jim Anderson resigned on March 3, 2015, after moving out of state. Boner was one of three names submitted to both Platte and Converse County Commissions, along with Republicans Timothy Millikin and Kerry Powers. He received 85.3% of the vote to finish Anderson's term.

=== 2016 ===
Boner ran for a full term, and defeated Darek Farmer in the Republican primary. Farmer had been a candidate for the U.S. House seat being vacated by Cynthia Lummis. Boner defeated Democrat Bill Cullen with 86% of the vote.

=== 2020 ===
Boner ran for a second full term and third overall. He ran without any major opposition in both the Republican primary and general election; he won the Republican primary with 99.1% of the vote and won reelection in the general election with 98.6% of the vote.
