= E. Jayne Mockler =

American politician (born 1957)

Member of the Wyoming Board of Equalization
- Incumbent
- Assumed office March 20, 2013
- Preceded by: Deborah Smith

Member of the Wyoming Senate from the 8th district
- In office January 6, 1997 – January 13, 2009
- Preceded by: James L. Applegate
- Succeeded by: Floyd Esquibel

Member of the Wyoming House of Representatives from the 44th district
- In office January 4, 1993 – January 6, 1997
- Preceded by: District created
- Succeeded by: Floyd Esquibel

Personal details
- Born: September 21, 1957 (age 68) Jackson, Wyoming, U.S.
- Party: Democratic
- Education: Wellesley College (BA)

E. Jayne Mockler (born September 21, 1957) is a Democratic politician from the state of Wyoming who currently serves as the Chairwoman of the Wyoming Board of Equalization. Prior to first being appointed to the Board in 2013 by Governor Matt Mead, Mockler served as a member of the Wyoming Legislature from Cheyenne, serving in the House of Representatives from 1993 to 1997, and in the Senate from 1997 to 2009. She was the Democratic nominee for Secretary of State in 1998 and a candidate for Mayor of Cheyenne in 2008.
