= John Schiffer =

American politician (1945–2014)

John C. Schiffer

Member of the Wyoming Senate from the 22nd district
- In office 1993–2014
- Preceded by: Robert H. Trent
- Succeeded by: Dave Kinskey

Personal details
- Born: August 17, 1945 Chadron, Nebraska
- Died: June 19, 2014 (aged 68) Kaycee, Wyoming
- Party: Republican
- Spouse: Nancy
- Profession: Rancher

John C. Schiffer (August 17, 1945 – June 19, 2014) was a Wyoming rancher and statesman. He represented the 22nd district in the Wyoming Senate for 21 years, and served in several Senate leadership positions, including President of the Senate in 2007-2008.

== Background ==
Schiffer was born to Ken and Bay Schiffer, in Chadron, Nebraska where his father was based at Fort Robinson during World War II. His family soon relocated to a ranch near Kaycee, Wyoming where Schiffer would be raised. He graduated from the Hotchkiss School in Lakeville, Connecticut before attending Colorado College and graduating with a degree in economics in 1967. He joined the U.S. Navy and served in Vietnam, where he became a lieutenant (junior grade). He returned to Kaycee to ranch in 1970 after completing his military service. In 1971, he married his wife Nancy, whom he had dated in college.

Schiffer operated the Hat Ranch west of Kaycee in the 1970s. In the 1980s, he formed the 48 Ranch partnership on the Powder River east of Kaycee, which he operated until his death. During the 1980s, Schiffer served on the Johnson County School Board and the board of the Northern Wyoming Mental Health Center. He was appointed to the Wyoming Environmental Quality Council by Governor Mike Sullivan and served as chairman for several years. He served on the Board of the First Northern Bank in Buffalo, Wyoming. He was a board member of the Wyoming chapter of the Nature Conservancy from 1996 through 2010.

== Wyoming Senate ==
Schiffer was appointed to the Wyoming Senate by the Johnson and Sheridan County Commissioners in 1993 to replace State Senator Bob Trent, who relocated out of state. He served in several leadership positions, including Senate Vice President (2003-2004), Senate Majority Floor Leader (2005-2006), and President of the Senate (2007-2008). He also chaired numerous committees during his service in the Senate, including the Senate Judiciary Committee (1999-2002, 2013-2014), Senate Appropriations Committee (2003-2004), the Select Committee on Mental Health and Substance Abuse (2005-2006), the Wyoming State Legislature Management Council (vice-chair, 2007-2008), the Senate Rules and Procedure Committee (2007-2008), the Senate Revenue Committee (2009-2010), the Management Audit Committee (2011-2012), and the Senate Transportation, Highways, & Military Affairs Committee (2011-2012). He chaired the Council of State Government West Energy and Public Lands Committee for several years.

As chairman of the Select Committee on Mental Health and Substance Abuse, Schiffer played a significant role in improving Wyoming's mental health and substance abuse services, an issue he began working on as a board member of the Northern Wyoming Mental Health Center.

The Wyoming County Commissioners Association honored Schiffer with their annual Senate Legislator of the Year Award in 2014 prior to his death. The award was given for his work to provide stable appropriations for local governments. He and his wife Nancy were honored in October 2014 at the Child Advocacy Service of the Big Horns (CASA) Light of Hope Breakfast for his work on student scholarships, child protection, compulsory school attendance, teacher recruitment, juvenile justice and public library endowments, and her career as a teacher, service as a volunteer, and work on the boards of the Wyoming Boys & Girls Club of the Big Horns and the Community Resource Council. In 2012, he was awarded the Council of State Governments West Bettye Fahrenkamp Award for Distinguished Legislative Leadership on Behalf of Western States.

== Death ==
Schiffer was diagnosed with liver cancer in May 2014 and died at his home on June 19, 2014. His death garnered statewide attention, and he was eulogized by his son Ben, his long-time friend and business partner State Treasurer Mark Gordon, colleagues in the legislature, former Governor Dave Freudenthal, and Governor Matt Mead, who ordered flags flown at half-staff in Schiffer's honor.
