= Dave Kinskey =

American politician

Vice President of the Wyoming Senate
- In office January 10, 2023 – January 6, 2025
- Preceded by: Larry Hicks
- Succeeded by: Tim Salazar

Member of the Wyoming Senate from the 22nd district
- In office July 8, 2014 – January 6, 2025
- Preceded by: John Schiffer
- Succeeded by: Barry Crago

Personal details
- Party: Republican
- Spouse: Donna Kinskey
- Children: 3
- Education: Harvard University (BA); University of Wyoming (JD)

Dave Kinskey is an American politician and a former Republican member of the Wyoming State Senate, representing the 22nd district from 2014 to 2025. He previously served, from 2005 until his appointment to the State Senate, as the Mayor of Sheridan, Wyoming.

== Early life and business career ==
Kinskey spent a great deal of time at the YMCA during his youth. He later received an economics degree from Harvard University in 1972 and a Juris Doctor degree from the University of Wyoming in 1982. Following law school he was a practicing attorney, and later a realtor and business executive. In 1988 he acquired the company M&M Home Medical Inc. Kinskey was also the business owner of TK, LLC. He was also a board member of SEEDA.

== Mayoral career ==
Kinskey served as mayor of Sheridan, Wyoming from 2005 until July 8, 2014. He was succeeded as mayor by City Council President John Heath. Prior to his election as mayor, Kinskey worked on the Senate campaigns of Wyoming Senators Malcolm Wallop and Alan Simpson, as well as Pete Simpson's unsuccessful gubernatorial run in 1986. During his time as mayor, Kinskey initiated projects including the north main interchange of the city. He also stated that he did not believe that Sheridan could preempt a potential state ban on public smoking by Wyoming, and advocated for the re-fluoridation of the city's water. Kinskey also pursued policy in support of the coal industry, trying to open the ports of West Wyoming to overseas coal exporting. Under him, the city balanced the budget and began to build their financial reserves, as well as streamlining approval processes. He resigned from his unexpired term in 2014 after being appointed to the Wyoming State Senate.

== Wyoming Senate ==
=== Elections ===
In 2014 Kinskey received 67.7% of the vote of Johnson and Sheridan County Commissioners to fill the seat after incumbent Republican Senator John Schiffer died. This saw Kinskey serving the last year and a half of Schiffer's term. Following his election, Kinskey said that Schiffer had been a mentor of his. In May 2016 Kinskey filed for reelection, and ran unopposed in both the primary and general elections for his first full term.

=== Legislation ===
Just as Kinskey was being sworn into office, the state’s mineral industry collapsed, leading to the loss of one quarter of the state’s revenues. Following this, Kinskey began advocating for immediate budget cuts, specifically to the recently approved renovation of the state’s Capitol building. As a member of the Senate Revenue Committee, he advocated for spending cuts over tax increases in dealing with the budget crisis. In 2015, Kinskey advocated for increased skilled nursing services and care centers for military veterans, co-sponsoring a bill to help fund new facilities in the Sheridan area.

In 2016 he was a supporter of a bill re-criminalizing edible marijuana, which ultimately passed in the Senate. He also cosponsored a wolf depredation compensation bill, which also passed. Kinskey opposes new tax bills, believing government should "live within its means". That year he also opposed Medicaid expansion in the state, and co-sponsored legislation to reform asset seizure laws.

In 2017 he co-sponsored legislation to reduce late term abortions and tighten the restrictions on fetal tissue sales. Kinsky has supported House Bill 194, which allows school districts to decide whether or not to allow teachers and other school staff to carry a concealed firearm when working, claiming that it would lead to greater school safety. He argued that not every school can afford a police officer, something he stated was particularly troublesome when it came to rural schools located fair distance from any local law enforcement, and that bans on guns in schools left the impression to potential criminals that they were not defensible. He also stated that they had written safeguards into the bill, including background checks and fingerprinting. Though he announced he supported cuts to the state budget, without regard to agency in order to tackle the $400 million budge deficit, he afterwards co-sponsored an amendment to the 2017 omnibus education funding bill to reduce the state's education spending cuts. He has stated that teacher effectiveness is the most important factor in childhood education. He also co-sponsored a Constitutional amendment to override the Wyoming Supreme Court decision to remove oversight of education funding from the hands of legislators.

Wyoming Senate
Preceded by Larry Hicks	Vice President of the Wyoming Senate; 2023–2025	Succeeded by Tim Salazar
