= Charles Scott (Wyoming politician) =

Wyoming politician

Member of the Wyoming Senate
- Incumbent
- Assumed office January 3, 1983
- Constituency: Natrona County (1983-1992); 30th district (1993-present)

Member of the Wyoming House of Representatives
- In office January 1, 1979 – January 3, 1983

Personal details
- Born: August 19, 1945 (age 80) USMC Base, near Klamath Falls, Oregon
- Party: Republican
- Occupation: Rancher

Charles K. Scott (born August 19, 1945) is a Republican member of the Wyoming Senate. Serving since 1983, Scott initially represented Natrona County in the state senate. After the state legislature switched from a county-based apportionment system to a district based apportionment system, in 1992, Scott was elected to represent the 30th senate district. Previously he was in the Wyoming House of Representatives from 1979 to 1982. From 1993-1994 he was vice president of the Senate. He won reelection to continue serving in the Wyoming State Senate on November 5, 2024.

In 1967, he received his B.A. from Harvard College and his MBA from Harvard Business School in 1969.

In 2012, Scott sponsored a resolution, SJR 3, meant to provide "health-care freedom" upon its amendment to the state constitution. Scott won reelection in 2016 over Democratic opponent Robert Ford 5,831-1,521 (79.3% - 20.7%). In February 2022, Scott was a strong proponent for a budget amendment to eliminate the University of Wyoming Gender Studies program, stating that it was, "extremely biased, ideologically driven that I can’t see any academically legitimacy to".
