= Hank Coe =

American politician (1946–2021)

Member of the Wyoming Senate
- In office 1989 – January 4, 2021
- Succeeded by: Tim French
- Constituency: Park County (1989-1992); 18th district (1993-2021)

Personal details
- Born: April 29, 1946 Cody, Wyoming, U.S.
- Died: January 21, 2021 (aged 74) Cody, Wyoming, U.S.
- Party: Republican
- Occupation: Investment Executive

Henry H. R. Coe (April 29, 1946 – January 21, 2021) was an American politician who served as a Republican member of the Wyoming Senate from 1989 until 2021. In 1988, Coe was elected to represent Park County. After the state legislature switched from a county-based apportionment system to a district based apportionment system, in 1992, Coe was elected to represent the 18th senate district. He served as the President of the Senate in the 2001-2002 session. He was the son of the philanthropist Henry Huttleston Rogers Coe. Coe died from pancreatic cancer in 2021, shortly after leaving office, having been diagnosed in November 2020.
