= 2012 Wyoming Senate election =

- November 6, 2012

15 of 30 seats in the Wyoming Senate (even-numbered seats up)
	Majority party	Minority party
Leader	Jim Anderson	John Hastert
Party	Republican	Democratic
Leader's seat	2nd district	13th district
Seats before	26	4
Seats after	26	4
Seat change	Steady	Steady
Popular vote	89,939	10,686
Percentage	82.12%	9.76%
- Results by district
Senate President before election
Jim Anderson
Republican
Elected Senate President
Tony Ross
Republican

The 2012 Wyoming Senate election was held on November 6, 2012, to elect members to the Wyoming Senate for its 62nd session as part of the 2012 United States elections. Partisan primaries were held on August 21. Neither Republicans nor Democrats made any gains in the state senate. Of the fifteen seats up for election, only two saw competition between Republicans and Democrats, with each party winning one.

This election saw the newly-formed Country Party stand a handful of candidates against incumbent Republicans, who they saw as "essentially progressive big-government liberals." No Country candidate won a seat.

== Predictions ==
Source	Ranking	As of
Governing	Safe R	October 24, 2012

== Summary ==
General election summary
Party	Candidates	Votes	%	Seats				
Party	Candidates	Votes	%	Before 61st Leg.	Up	Won	After 62nd Leg.	+/–
Republican	14	89,939	82.12	26	13	13	26	Steady
Democratic	3	10,686	9.76	4	2	2	4	Steady
Country	3	3,753	3.43	0	0	0	0	Steady
Write-in		5,150	4.70	—				
Valid ballots		109,528	87.12	—				
Blank or invalid ballots		16,198	12.88	—				
Total		125,726	100%	30	15		30	Steady

Popular vote
Republican	82.12%
Democratic	9.76%
Country	3.4%
Write-ins	4.7%

Seats won
Republican	86.67%
Democratic	13.33%

Total senate seats
Republican	86.67%
Democratic	13.33%
