= 2008 Wyoming Senate election =

- November 4, 2008

16 of 30 seats in the Wyoming Senate (District 27 and even-numbered seats up)
	Majority party	Minority party
Leader	John Schiffer	Ken Decaria
Party	Republican	Democratic
Leader's seat	23rd district	15th district
Seats before	22	7
Seats after	23	7
Seat change	▲1	Steady
Popular vote	94,980	25,203
Percentage	78.00%	20.70%
- Results by district
Senate President before election
John Schiffer
Republican
Elected Senate President
John Hines
Republican

The 2008 Wyoming Senate election was held on November 4, 2008, to elect members to the Wyoming Senate for its 60th session as part of the 2008 United States elections. All even-numbered seats were up for election. An additional election was held in District 27 as incumbent Republican John Barrasso retired in 2007 after being appointed to the U.S. Senate. Partisan primaries were held on August 19. Neither party gained any seat in the legislature, and both Democratic incumbents stood unopposed in the general election.

== Predictions ==
Source	Ranking	As of
Stateline	Safe R	October 15, 2008

== Overview ==
General election summary
Party	Candidates	Votes	%	Seats				
Party	Candidates	Votes	%	Before 59th Leg.	Up	Won	After 60th Leg.	+/–
Republican	14	94,980	78.0	22	13	14	23	▲1
Democratic	7	25,203	20.7	7	2	2	7	Steady
Write-in		1,582	1.3	—				
Valid ballots		121,765	87.14	—				
Blank or invalid ballots		17,969	12.89	—				
Total		139,734	100%	30 (1 v.)	16 (1 v.)	15	30	Steady

Popular vote
Republican	78.00%
Democratic	20.70%
Write-ins	1.3%

Seats won
Republican	87.5%
Democratic	12.5%

Total senate seats
Republican	86.67%
Democratic	13.33%
