= Wyoming Highway 216 =

State highway in Laramie County, Wyoming, United States

Wyoming Highway 216
- Albin Road
- WYO 216 highlighted in red

Route information
- Maintained by WYDOT
- Length: 18.54 mi (29.84 km)

Major junctions
- West end: US 85 southwest of Meriden
- WYO 213 south of Meriden; WYO 215 east of Albin
- East end: CR 164 at the Nebraska state line near Albin

Location
- Country: United States
- State: Wyoming
- Counties: Laramie

Highway system
- Wyoming State Highway System; Interstate; US; State
← WYO 215	→ WYO 217

Wyoming Highway 216 (WYO 216), Albin Road, is a 18.54-mile (29.84 km) state highway in the northeastern part of Laramie County, Wyoming, United States, that connects U.S. Route 85 (US 85), south-southwest of Meriden with County Road 164 (CR 164) at the Nebraska state line (east of Albin).

== Route description ==
WYO 216 begins its west end at an intersection with US 85 that is located 26 miles (42 km) northeast of the Interstate 25/US 85 split. WYO 216 travels east intersecting Wyoming Highway 213 (Burns North Road) after just 3.4 miles (5.5 km). WYO 216 continues east, passing through Albin between 15.83 and 16.18 miles (25.48 and 26.04 km). At 16.47 miles (26.51 km), WYO 216 intersects the northern terminus of WYO 215. WYO 216 then continues east to CR 164 (State Line Road), located on the Nebraska–Wyoming state line, where it terminates.

== History ==
The Wyoming Highway 216 designation was originally commissioned in 1926 in Weston and Crook counties. US 16 and Wyoming Highway 116 were designated the same year. WYO 216 began as a state route, but was quickly added to the U.S. route system as US 216. However, in 1936, US 216 became part of the US 16 mainline, and the US 216 designation was deleted.

== Major intersections ==
The entire route is in Laramie County.

Location	mi	km	Destinations	Notes
	0.00	0.00	CR 229 west	Continuation west beyond western terminus
	0.00	0.00	US 85 north (CanAm Highway) – WYO 213, Hawk Springs, Torrington US 85 south (CanAm Highway) – Cheyenne, Denver (Colorado)	Western terminus
	3.36	5.41	WYO 213 north (Burns Road) – Hawk Springs, Torrington WYO 213 south (Burns Road) – Burns	
	16.49	26.54	CR 162 north (Albin-La Grange Road) – La Grange WYO 215 south (Pine Bluff-Albin Road) – Pine Bluffs	Northern end of WYO 215
	18.54	29.84	Road 1 north (State Line Road) CR 164 south (State Line Road)	Eastern terminus: T intersection at the Nebraska state line
1.000 mi = 1.609 km; 1.000 km = 0.621 mi

== See also ==
- List of state highways in Wyoming
