= Wyoming Highway 215 =

State highway in Laramie County, Wyoming, United States

Wyoming Highway 215
- Pine Bluff-Albin Road
- WYO 215 highlighted in red

Route information
- Maintained by WYDOT
- Length: 17.19 mi (27.66 km)

Major junctions
- South end: I-80 BL / US 30 in Pine Bluffs
- North end: WYO 216 east of Albin

Location
- Country: United States
- State: Wyoming
- Counties: Laramie

Highway system
- Wyoming State Highway System; Interstate; US; State
← WYO 214	→ WYO 216

Wyoming Highway 215 (WYO 215), Pine Bluffs-Albin Road, is a 17.19-mile (27.66 km), two-lane state highway in Laramie County, Wyoming, United states, that connects Interstate 80 Business/U.S. Route 30 (I-80 BL/US 30) in Pine Bluffs with Wyoming Highway 216, just east of Albin.

== Route description ==
WYO 215 begins at I-80 BL/US 30 (Parson Street), just north of Exit 401 on Interstate 80/US 30 in southwestern Pine Bluffs. (I-80 BL/US 30 heads south toward Interstate 80 and north, then east, toward Nebraska, but I-80 BL no longer continues into that state.) From its southern terminus WYO 215 heads very briefly west on a viaduct over Old U.S. 30 and four sets of railway tracks as it turns north to run just inside the western edge of Pine Bluffs. After connecting with the western end of North Main Street, crossing over Lodgepole Creek, and connecting with the eastern end of County Road 213, WYO 215 leaves Pine Bluffs and continues north through rural agricultural area for the greater part of its course. (North of Pine Bluffs, the county roads are spaced 1 mile (1.6 km) apart, in sequential order.)

Roughly 1.4 miles (2.3 km) north of Pine Bluffs, WYO 215 connect with the western end of County Road 215 and then the western end of County Road 216. About 2.0 miles (3.2 km) farther north WYO 215 crosses County Road 218 and then County Road 219. After connecting with the western end of County Road 220 WYO 215 crosses County Road 221 and promptly passes to the west of a Minuteman missile silo. After crossing County Road 222, County Road 223, and County Road 224, WYO 215 connect with the western end of County Road 226. As WYO 215 crosses County Road 227 it jogs about 3,300 feet (1,000 m) to the west before resuming its course to the north and crosses County Road 228.

About 1 mile (1.6 km) farther north WYO 215 reaches its northern terminus at WYO 216 at an intersection (that includes the southern end of County Road 162 [CR 162/Albin-La Grange Road]) about 1,500 feet (460 m) east of the Albin town limits. (WYO 216 heads west through Albin before ending at U.S. Route 85, southwest of Meriden. WYO 216 heads east to the Nebraska state line. CR 162 head north toward Wyoming Highway 151 and La Grance.)

== Major intersections ==
The entire route is in Laramie County.

Location	mi	km	Destinations	Notes
Pine Bluffs	0.00	0.00	West 8th Street east	Continuation east beyond southern terminus
Pine Bluffs	0.00	0.00	I-80 BL / US 30 north – Nebraska I-80 BL / US 30 south – I-80	Southern terminus: Just north of I-80 Exit 401
	17.19	27.66	WYO 216 east WYO 216 west – Albin, US 85	Northern terminus
	17.19	27.66	CR 162 north – La Grange	Continuation north beyond northern terminus
1.000 mi = 1.609 km; 1.000 km = 0.621 mi

== See also ==
- List of state highways in Wyoming
