= Wyoming Highway 217 =

Former state highway in Wyoming, United States

Wyoming Highway 217
- WYO 217 highlighted in red

Route information
- Maintained by WYDOT
- Length: 4.43 mi (7.13 km)

Major junctions
- South end: CR 140 northwest of Carpenter
- North end: I-80 / US 30 southwest of Hillsdale

Location
- Country: United States
- State: Wyoming
- Counties: Laramie

Highway system
- Wyoming State Highway System; Interstate; US; State
← WYO 216	→ WYO 218

Wyoming Highway 217 (WYO 217) was a state highway in the southeastern part of Laramie County, Wyoming.

== Route description ==
Wyoming Highway 217 traveled from I-80/US 30 (Exit 377) south for 4.42 miles. Highway 217 ended at Milepost 4.42 and continued as Laramie County Route 140.

The route was decommissioned in 2009; all state route marker signs have been removed, and the route no longer appears on the Wyoming Official State Highway Map.

== Major intersections ==
The entire route is in Laramie County.

Location	mi	km	Destinations	Notes
	0.00	0.00	CR 140	
	4.42	7.11	I-80 / US 30	Exit 377 on I-80
1.000 mi = 1.609 km; 1.000 km = 0.621 mi
