= Wyoming Highway 213 =

State highway in Wyoming, United States

Wyoming Highway 213
- Burns Road; Burns Road North
- WYO 213 highlighted in red

Route information
- Maintained by WYDOT, Town of Burns
- Length: 19.8 mi (31.9 km)

Major junctions
- South end: I-80 / US 30; WYO 214 south of Burns
- WYO 216 south of Merinden
- North end: US 85 southwest of Merinden

Location
- Country: United States
- State: Wyoming
- Counties: Laramie

Highway system
- Wyoming State Highway System; Interstate; US; State
← WYO 212	→ WYO 214

Wyoming Highway 213 (WYO 213) is a 19.8-mile-long (31.9 km) state highway in the eastern part of Laramie County, Wyoming, United States. Named Burns Road, it provides travel between Interstate 80/U.S. Highway 30 and the town of Burns and north to WYO 216 and US 85.

== Route description ==
Wyoming Highway 213 begins its south end at an interchange with Interstate 80/US 30 at exit 386, which is also the northern terminus of Wyoming Highway 214. Historically, WYO 213 turned west and traveled along the I-80 Service Road for half a mile before turning north onto Burns Road into Burns. WYO 213 used to end at Burns, but was extended in 2009 north to U.S. Route 85, seven miles south of Meriden. Since 2012, Wyoming Highway 213 has been rerouted out of the Burns town center and over a $6.6 million railway overpass just east of the town, avoiding an at-grade crossing.

== Major intersections ==
The entire route is in Laramie County.

Location	mi	km	Destinations	Notes
	0.00	0.00	I-80 / US 30; WYO 214	I-80 exit 386; southern terminus of WYO 213, northern terminus of WYO 214
	18.1	29.1	WYO 216	
	19.8	31.9	US 85	northern terminus of WYO 213
1.000 mi = 1.609 km; 1.000 km = 0.621 mi

== See also ==
- List of state highways in Wyoming
