= List of highways numbered 218 =

The following highways are numbered 218:

== Canada ==
- Manitoba Provincial Road 218
- New Brunswick Route 218
- Prince Edward Island Route 218
- Quebec Route 218

== China ==
- China National Highway 218

== Costa Rica ==
- National Route 218

== Japan ==
- Japan National Route 218

== United Kingdom ==
- A218 road
- B218 road

== United States ==
- U.S. Route 218
- Arkansas Highway 218
- California State Route 218
- Connecticut Route 218
- Florida State Road 218 (former)
- Georgia State Route 218 (former)
- K-218 (Kansas highway)
- Kentucky Route 218
- Maine State Route 218
- Maryland Route 218
- M-218 (Michigan highway) (former)
- Minnesota State Highway 218
- Montana Secondary Highway 218
- New Mexico State Road 218
- New York State Route 218
- North Carolina Highway 218
- Ohio State Route 218
- Oregon Route 218
- Pennsylvania Route 218
- South Dakota Highway 218 (former)
- Tennessee State Route 218
- Texas State Highway 218
  - Texas State Highway Loop 218
- Utah State Route 218
- Virginia State Route 218
- West Virginia Route 218
- Wyoming Highway 218

Preceded by 217	Lists of highways 218	Succeeded by 219
