= Wyoming's 10th House of Representatives district =

American legislative district

Wyoming's 10th State House of Representatives district
- Wyoming's 10th House of Representatives district as of 2022
Representative
Justin Fornstrom; R–Pine Bluffs
- Demographics: 84% White; 10% Hispanic; 1% Other; 4% Multiracial
- Population (2022): 9,392

Wyoming's 10th House of Representatives district is one of 62 districts in the Wyoming House of Representatives. The district encompasses part of Laramie County. It is represented by Republican Representative Justin Fornstrom of Pine Bluffs.

In 1992, the state of Wyoming switched from electing state legislators by county to a district-based system.

== List of members representing the district ==
Representative	Party	Term	Note
Rodney Anderson	Republican	1993 – 2011	Elected in 1992. Re-elected in 1994. Re-elected in 1996. Re-elected in 1998. Re-elected in 2000. Re-elected in 2002. Re-elected in 2004. Re-elected in 2006. Re-elected in 2008.
John Eklund Jr.	Republican	2011 – 2025	Elected in 2010. Re-elected in 2012. Re-elected in 2014. Re-elected in 2016. Re-elected in 2018. Re-elected in 2020. Re-elected in 2022. Re-elected in 2024. Died in office.
Justin Fornstrom	Republican	2025 – present	Appointed in 2025.

== Recent election results ==
=== 2014 ===
House district 10 general election
Party	Candidate	Votes	%
Republican	John Eklund Jr. (Incumbent)	2,282	74.35%
Democratic	Gaylan D. Wright Sr.	774	25.21%
Write-ins		13	0.42%
Total votes		3,069	100.0%
Invalid or blank votes		124	
Republican hold			

=== 2016 ===
House district 10 general election
Party	Candidate	Votes	%
Republican	John Eklund Jr. (Incumbent)	4,187	82.84%
Democratic	Matthew Porras	846	16.73%
Write-ins		21	0.41%
Total votes		5,054	100.0%
Invalid or blank votes		320	
Republican hold			

=== 2018 ===
House district 10 general election
Party	Candidate	Votes	%
Republican	John Eklund Jr. (Incumbent)	3,332	79.88%
Democratic	Jenefer Pasqua	825	19.77%
Write-ins		14	0.33%
Total votes		4,171	100.0%
Invalid or blank votes		141	
Republican hold			

=== 2020 ===
House district 10 general election
Party	Candidate	Votes	%
Republican	John Eklund Jr. (Incumbent)	5,565	97.64%
Write-ins		134	2.35%
Total votes		5,699	100.0%
Invalid or blank votes		548	
Republican hold			

=== 2022 ===
House district 10 general election
Party	Candidate	Votes	%
Republican	John Eklund Jr. (Incumbent)	3,197	97.43%
Write-ins		84	2.56%
Total votes		3,281	100.0%
Invalid or blank votes		333	
Republican hold			

=== 2024 ===
House district 10 general election
Party	Candidate	Votes	%
Republican	John Eklund Jr. (Incumbent)	3,963	81.42%
Independent	Tim Forbis	865	17.77%
Write-ins		39	0.80%
Total votes		4,867	100.0%
Invalid or blank votes		175	
Republican hold			

== Historical district boundaries ==
Map	Description	Apportionment Plan	Notes
	Laramie County (part)	1992 Apportionment Plan	
	Laramie County (part)	2002 Apportionment Plan	
	Goshen County (part); Laramie County (part)	2012 Apportionment Plan	
