= Wyoming's 8th House of Representatives district =

American legislative district

Wyoming's 8th State House of Representatives district
- Wyoming's 8th House of Representatives district as of 2022
Representative
Steve Johnson; R–Cheyenne
- Demographics: 85% White; 1% Black; 7% Hispanic; 1% Asian; 1% Native American; 3% Other; 3% Multiracial
- Population (2022): 8,060

Wyoming's 8th House of Representatives district is one of 62 districts in the Wyoming House of Representatives. The district encompasses part of Laramie County. It is represented by Republican Representative Steve Johnson of Cheyenne.

In 1992, the state of Wyoming switched from electing state legislators by county to a district-based system.

== List of members representing the district ==
Representative	Party	Term	Note
Larry Shippy	Republican	1993 – 1997	Elected in 1992. Re-elected in 1994.
Larry Meuli	Republican	1997 – 2007	Elected in 1996. Re-elected in 1998. Re-elected in 2000. Re-elected in 2002. Re-elected in 2004.
Lori Millin	Democratic	2007 – 2011	Elected in 2006. Re-elected in 2008.
Bob Nicholas	Republican	2011 – 2023	Elected in 2010. Re-elected in 2012. Re-elected in 2014. Re-elected in 2016. Re-elected in 2018. Re-elected in 2020.
David Zwonitzer	Republican	2023 – 2025	Elected in 2022.
Steve Johnson	Republican	2025 – present	Elected in 2024.
Luke Reiner	Republican	2027 – member-elect	Elected in 2026.

== Recent election results ==
=== 2014 ===
House district 8 general election
Party	Candidate	Votes	%
Republican	Bob Nicholas (Incumbent)	2,481	97.75%
Write-ins		57	2.24%
Total votes		2,538	100.0%
Invalid or blank votes		926	
Republican hold			

=== 2016 ===
House district 8 general election
Party	Candidate	Votes	%
Republican	Bob Nicholas (Incumbent)	2,570	56.83%
Democratic	Linda Burt	1,941	42.92%
Write-ins		11	0.24%
Total votes		4,522	100.0%
Invalid or blank votes		271	
Republican hold			

=== 2018 ===
House district 8 general election
Party	Candidate	Votes	%
Republican	Bob Nicholas (Incumbent)	2,212	57.73%
Democratic	Mitch Guthrie	1,609	41.99%
Write-ins		10	0.26%
Total votes		3,831	100.0%
Invalid or blank votes		148	
Republican hold			

=== 2020 ===
House district 8 general election
Party	Candidate	Votes	%
Republican	Bob Nicholas (Incumbent)	2,547	52.85%
Democratic	Marcie Kindred	2,259	46.87%
Write-ins		13	0.26%
Total votes		4,819	100.0%
Invalid or blank votes		91	
Republican hold			

=== 2022 ===
House district 8 general election
Party	Candidate	Votes	%
Republican	David Zwonitzer	2,717	68.38%
Independent	Brenda Lyttle	1,214	30.55%
Write-ins		42	1.05%
Total votes		3,973	100.0%
Invalid or blank votes		42	
Republican hold			

=== 2024 ===
House district 8 general election
Party	Candidate	Votes	%
Republican	Steve Johnson	4,229	92.45%
Write-ins		345	7.54%
Total votes		4,574	100.0%
Invalid or blank votes		763	
Republican hold			

== Historical district boundaries ==
Map	Description	Apportionment Plan	Notes
	Laramie County (part)	1992 Apportionment Plan	
	Laramie County (part)	2002 Apportionment Plan	
	Laramie County (part)	2012 Apportionment Plan	
