= David Zwonitzer =

American politician

Member of the Wyoming House of Representatives from the 8th district
- In office January 10, 2023 – January 2025
- Preceded by: Bob Nicholas (redistricted)
- Succeeded by: Steve Johnson

Member of the Wyoming House of Representatives from the 9th district
- In office May 2006 – January 10, 2017
- Preceded by: Bryan Pedersen
- Succeeded by: Landon Brown

Personal details
- Born: March 10, 1953 (age 73) Holton, Kansas, U.S.
- Party: Republican
- Education: University of Wyoming (BS, MS)

David Lee Zwonitzer (born March 10, 1953) is an American politician and a former Republican member of the Wyoming House of Representatives who represented District 9 from 2006 until 2017, and District 8 from 2023 to 2025. His son Dan is also a member of the Wyoming House.

== Education ==
Zwonitzer earned his BS and MS in water resources from the University of Wyoming.

== Elections ==
- 2006 Zwontizer was appointed to the state House by the Laramie County Commission in April following the resignation of Representative Bryan Pedersen. He was sworn in May.
- 2006 Zwonitzer was unopposed for the August 22, 2006 Republican Primary, winning with 939 votes, and won the November 7, 2006 General election with 1,659 votes (56.4%) against Democratic nominee Sleeter Dover.
- 2008 Zwonitzer won the August 19, 2008 Republican Primary with 633 votes (69.0%), and won the November 4, 2008 General election with 2,332 votes (57.6%) against Democratic nominee Tony Reyes.
- 2010 Zwonitzer was unopposed for both the August 17, 2010 Republican Primary, winning with 1,179 votes, and the November 2, 2010 General election, winning with 2,321 votes.
- 2012 Zwonitzer won the August 21, 2012 Republican Primary with 758 votes (52.1%), and won the four-way November 6, 2012 General election with 2,609 votes (63.2%) against Constitution candidate Skip Eshelman, Libertarian candidate Charles Kenworthy, and Wyoming Country Party candidate Perry Helgeson.
- 2014 Zwonitzer won a fifth term for House District 9, securing 57% of the vote to defeat Democrat Mike Weiland.
