= William H. Harrison (Wyoming politician) =

American politician (1894–1991)

Mayor of Pine Bluffs, Wyoming

Member of the Wyoming House of Representatives from Laramie County

Personal details
- Born: William Henry Harrison; October 29, 1894 Dunbar, Nebraska
- Died: December 26, 1991 (aged 97) Cheyenne, Wyoming
- Party: Republican
- Spouse: Hazel Elizabeth
- Children: 3
- Education: Nebraska State School of Agriculture

William Henry Harrison (October 29, 1894 – December 26, 1991) was an American politician who served in the Wyoming House of Representatives as a Republican.

== Early life ==
William Henry Harrison was born on October 29, 1894, in Dunbar, Nebraska, to Marshall Thomas and Martha Charlotte Kruse. He graduated from Dunbar High School and later from the Nebraska State School of Agriculture.

In 1919, he moved to Pine Bluffs, Wyoming and later built the first gas station in Pine Bluffs with his brother-in-law, A. E. Carlstrum, in 1924. On November 27, 1924, he married Hazel Elizabeth Carlstrum and had three children with her.

== Career ==
Harrison represented Laramie County in the Wyoming House of Representatives as a Republican. He served as the mayor of Pine Bluffs until he announced that he would not seek reelection in 1951.

In the House of Representatives he served alongside another William Henry Harrison III, who was a direct descendant of Presidents William Henry Harrison and Benjamin Harrison, from Sheridan County. Both he and the Harrison from Sheridan County had sons named William Henry Harrison.

On December 26, 1991, he died at DePaul Hospital in Cheyenne, Wyoming.
