= John Eklund Jr. =

American politician (1951–2025)

Member of the Wyoming House of Representatives from the 10th district
- In office January 11, 2011 – November 14, 2025
- Preceded by: Rodney Anderson
- Succeeded by: Justin Fornstrom

Personal details
- Born: September 1, 1951 Cheyenne, Wyoming, U.S.
- Died: November 14, 2025 (aged 74) Cheyenne, Wyoming, U.S.
- Party: Republican
- Spouse: Suzi
- Children: 3
- Education: University of Wyoming (BS)
- Profession: Rancher

John Charles Eklund Jr. (September 1, 1951 – November 14, 2025) was an American politician who was a Republican member of the Wyoming House of Representatives representing District 10 from 2011 until his death in 2025.

== Background ==
Eklund was born on September 1, 1951. A native of Albin, Wyoming, Eklund earned his BS from the University of Wyoming. He was a rancher in the Cheyenne, Wyoming, area.

Eklund and his wife, Suzi, had three children.

Eklund died from cancer in Cheyenne, on November 14, 2025, at the age of 74.

== Elections ==
- 2020 Eklund won in a four-way fight between him, Jennifer Burns, Lars Lone and Donn L. Edmunds in the August 18, 2020, Republican Primary with 1,330 votes (54.2%). In the November 3, 2020, General Election, Eklund was unopposed, winning with 5,565 votes.
- 2018 Eklund was challenged for the third time by Donn L. Edmunds in the August 21, 2018, Republican Primary and defeated him with 1,808 votes (76.4%). He was challenged by Jenefer Pasqua in the November 6, 2018, General Election and won with 3,332 votes (79.9%).
- 2016 Eklund defeated Donn L. Edmunds in the August 16, 2016, Republican Primary and won with 1,375 votes (77.7%). In the November 8, 2016, General Election, Eklund defeated Democrat Matthew Porras with 2,282 votes (74.7%).
- 2014 Eklund defeated Anthony Bouchard and Donn L. Edmunds in the August 19, 2014, Republican Primary, winning with 1,186 votes (59.4%). In the November 4, 2014, General Election, Eklund was running against Gaylan Wright, Sr. from the Democratic Party and won with 2,282 votes (74.7%).
- 2012 Eklund won the August 21, 2012, Republican Primary with 1,326 votes (71.5%), and was unopposed for the November 6, 2012, General election, winning with 3,844 votes.
- 2010 When Republican Representative Rodney Anderson retired and left the District 10 seat open, Eklund won the August 17, 2010, Republican Primary with 1,484 votes (61.5%), and won the November 2, 2010, General election with 3,119 votes (67.7%) against Democratic nominee Gary Roadifer, who had sought the seat in 2008.
