= List of highways numbered 217 =

The following highways are numbered 217:

== Canada ==
- Manitoba Provincial Road 217
- Nova Scotia Route 217
- Prince Edward Island Route 217
- Quebec Route 217

== China ==
- China National Highway 217

== Costa Rica ==
- National Route 217

== India ==
- National Highway 217 (India)

== Japan ==
- Japan National Route 217

== United Kingdom ==
- A217 road
- B217 road

== United States ==
- U.S. Route 217 (former)
- Alabama State Route 217
- Arizona State Route 217 (former)
- Arkansas Highway 217
- California State Route 217
- Connecticut Route 217
- Florida State Road 217 (former)
- Georgia State Route 217 (former)
- K-217 (Kansas highway)
- Kentucky Route 217
- Maine State Route 217 (former)
- M-217 (Michigan highway)
- Minnesota State Highway 217
- Montana Secondary Highway 217
- New Mexico State Road 217
- New York State Route 217
- North Carolina Highway 217
- Ohio State Route 217
- Oregon Route 217
- Pennsylvania Route 217
- South Carolina Highway 217
- Tennessee State Route 217
- Texas State Highway 217
  - Texas State Highway Loop 217
- Utah State Route 217 (former)
- Virginia State Route 217
- Wyoming Highway 217

== See also ==
- 217th Street (Manhattan), NYC, NYS, USA; an urban street

Preceded by 216	Lists of highways 217	Succeeded by 218
