= Rodney Anderson (Wyoming politician) =

American politician (1931–2025)

Member of the Wyoming House of Representatives from the 10th district
- In office 1993 – 2011
- Preceded by: Constituency established
- Succeeded by: John Eklund Jr.

Personal details
- Born: July 9, 1931 Kimball, Nebraska, U.S.
- Died: April 26, 2025 (aged 93) Pine Bluffs, Wyoming, U.S.
- Party: Republican
- Spouse: Dorothy (Dot) Peterson Anderson 1954-1996, Bonnie Elliott Peterson Anderson 1996- present
- Children: Debbie Peterson Anderson (step), Jerri Anderson Cornils, Jim Anderson, and Linda Anderson Teeters.
- Profession: Politician, farmer and rancher

Rodney Vernon "Pete" Anderson (July 9, 1931 – April 26, 2025) was an American politician. He served as a Republican member of the Wyoming House of Representatives, representing the 10th district.

== Life and career ==
Anderson was born in Kimball, Nebraska on July 9, 1931. He attended Bethel College from 1949 to 1950, John Brown University from 1950 to 1951, and the University of Wyoming from 1951 to 1953. He worked as a farmer/rancher, and served in the 82nd Airborne Division from 1953 to 1955.

He was the President of Anderson Livestock from 1965 to 1996, and President of D.R.W. Incorporated from 1970 to 2004. He was a member of the Wyoming House of Representatives from 1993 to 2010. He served as Majority Whip in the State House from 2001 to 2002. He served as Chairman of the Revenue Committee and Select Water Committee.

Anderson and his wife resided in Pine Bluffs, Wyoming. He died there on April 26, 2025, at the age of 93.

== See also ==
- XVIII Airborne Corps (United States)
- 82nd Airborne Division
