= James R. Carpenter =

American politician (1867–1943)

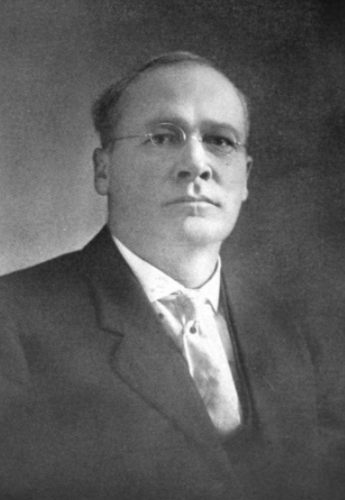

Member of the Wyoming Senate from Laramie County
- In office 1911–1915

Personal details
- Born: James Ross Carpenter; August 7, 1867 Monmouth, Illinois, U.S.
- Died: January 27, 1943 (aged 75) Cheyenne, Wyoming, U.S.
- Resting place: Lakeview Cemetery, Cheyenne, Wyoming, U.S.
- Party: Democratic
- Spouse: Fanny May Russell
- Children: 3
- Parents: George Daniel Carpenter (father); Margery Ann Pollock (mother)
- Education: Monmouth College; National Normal University

James Ross Carpenter (August 7, 1867 – January 27, 1943) was a Wyoming politician and inventor who served in the Wyoming Senate as a member of the Democratic Party. Prior to his political career he helped in the founding and advertisement of multiple towns in Wyoming.

== Early life ==
James Ross Carpenter was born in Monmouth, Illinois, to George Daniel Carpenter and Margery Ann Pollock on August 7, 1867. He was educated in public schools in Illinois and Kansas and graduated from Monmouth College and the National Normal University. On September 15, 1887, he married Fanny May Russell and later had three children with her.

== Career ==
=== Inventor and founder ===
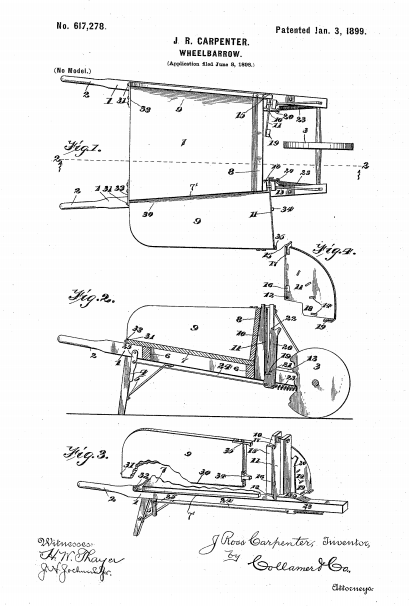
James R. Carpenter's wheelbarrow patent

From 1887 to 1892, he was a rancher in western Kansas and then moved to Des Moines, Iowa from 1892 to 1907, before moving to Wyoming in 1907. There he helped create Carpenter, Wyoming, which was named in his honor, and then moved to Cheyenne in 1910. In 1905, he founded the Federal Land Company that helped in the foundation and advertisement of multiple Wyoming towns including Burns, Wyoming.

On June 8, 1898, Carpenter filed a patent for a wheelbarrow with detachable parts and was given the patent on January 3, 1899. On December 19, 1936, he filed a patent for cutting agatized petrified wood.

=== State politics ===
In 1910, Carpenter was elected to the Wyoming Senate from Laramie County as a member of the Democratic Party. In 1912, he was selected by Governor Joseph M. Carey to serve as a delegate to the National Farm Congress. During the 1913 Senate election Carpenter nominated John B. Kendrick against incumbent Republican Senator Francis E. Warren, but Kendrick lost both votes in the state House of Representatives and Senate. During the twelfth session of the state legislature Carpenter served on the Immigration, Public Printing, and Public Accounts Senate committees. He served until 1915.

In 1912, he was elected to be Wyoming's Democratic Congressional committeeman and served as chairman of the Democratic Central Committee of Laramie county from 1914 to 1916. In 1916, he was selected to serve as a delegate to the Democratic National Convention alongside John B. Kendrick, Victor T. Johnson, Pete Kinney, J. J. Cash, and P. J. O'Connor.

=== U.S. House of Representatives ===
Carpenter was a supporter of alcoholic prohibition and supported Perry W. Jenkins's primary challenge against incumbent republican representative Vincent Carter during the 1932 House of Representatives election as Carter was against the 18th Amendment.

On September 13, 1932, he announced that he would run in the House of Representatives election as an independent and filed to run on September 26, as the nominee of the American Party. In the general election he placed fourth after spending $82.28 on his campaign.

== Later life ==
Carpenter opposed the sale of alcohol in Carpenter, Wyoming, following the repeal of the 18th Amendment and the end of alcoholic prohibition in the United States.

On January 27, 1943, Carpenter died at his home in Cheyenne, Wyoming, after suffering from an illness for two months.

== Electoral history ==
1932 Wyoming at-large congressional district election
Party	Candidate	Votes	%
Republican	Vincent Carter (incumbent)	5,670	51.84%
Democratic	Paul Ranous Greever	5,040	46.08%
Socialist	W. W. Wolfe	126	1.15%
American	James R. Carpenter	90	0.82%
Communist	George Morphis	11	0.10%
Total votes		10,937	100.00%
