= Sue Wilson =

American politician

Member of the Wyoming House of Representatives from the 7th district
- In office January 8, 2013 – January 2023
- Preceded by: Bryan Pedersen
- Succeeded by: Bob Nicholas

Personal details
- Party: Republican
- Education: Yale University; Thomas Edison State University; University of Wisconsin–Madison
- Website: wilsonwyominghouse7.com

Sue Wilson is an American politician and a former Republican member of the Wyoming House of Representatives who represented District 7 from January 8, 2013 to January 2023.

== Education ==
Wilson earned her BA in psychology from Yale University, her BA in history and social sciences from Thomas Edison State College, and her master's degree in business from the University of Wisconsin–Madison.

== Elections ==
- 2012 When Republican Representative Bryan Pedersen retired and left the District 7 seat open, Wilson won the two-way August 21, 2012 Republican Primary with 1,670 votes (72.2%), and the November 6, 2012 General election with 3,320 votes (61.9%) against Democratic nominee Joe Fender.
- 2014 Wilson was unopposed in both the August 19, 2014 Republican Primary and the November 4, 2014 General Election, winning with 2,351 votes and 3,386 votes respectively.
- 2016 Wilson was challenged by Cody Haynes in the August 16, 2016 Republican Primary and won with 1,767 votes (74.6%). Wilson was unopposed in the November 8, 2016 General Election, winning with 4,782 votes.
- 2018 Wilson was challenged by John Lyttle in the August 18, 2020 Republican Primary and won with 1,897 votes (58.5%) She was unopposed in the November 6, 2018 General Election and won with 4,283 votes.
- 2020 In the August 18, 2020 Republican Primary, Wilson was challenged for the second time by Cody Haynes and won again with 1,904 votes (67.9%). Wilson was unopposed for the November 3, 2020 General Election, winning with 5,804 votes.
