= West Virginia Route 218 =

State highway in West Virginia, United States

West Virginia Route 218

Route information
- Maintained by WVDOH
- Length: 22.8 mi (36.7 km)

Major junctions
- South end: US 19 in Worthington
- US 250 at Farmington; WV 7 at Blacksville
- North end: PA 218 in Blacksville

Location
- Country: United States
- State: West Virginia
- Counties: Marion; Monongalia

Highway system
- West Virginia State Highway System; Interstate; US; State
← WV 214	→ US 219

West Virginia Route 218 (WV 218) is a north–south state highway located in Marion and Mononagalia counties in northern West Virginia, United States, that connects U.S. Route 19 (US 19) with the Pennsylvania state line.

== Route description ==
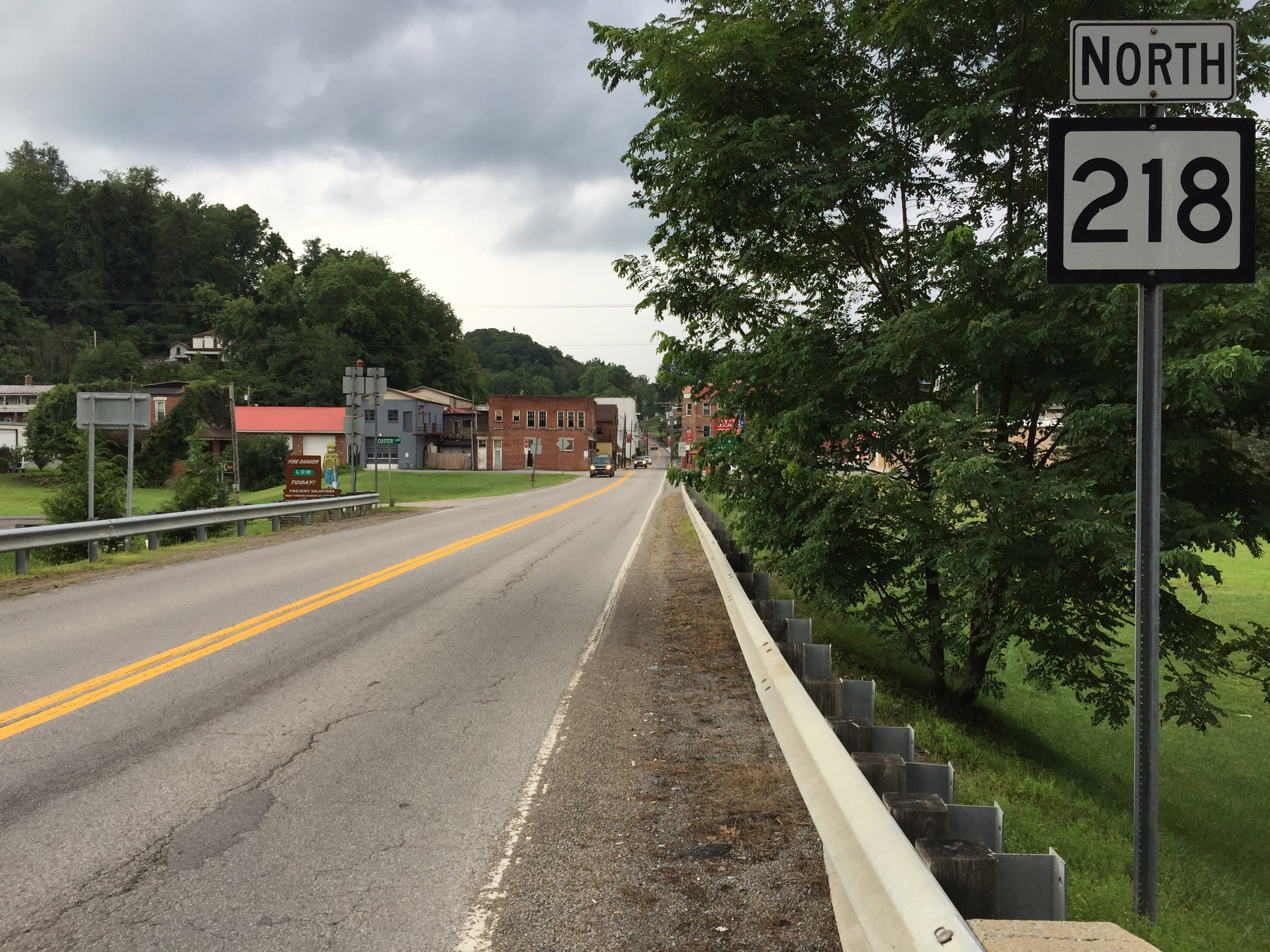
View north along WV 218 at U.S. Route 250 in Farmington, July 2017

WV 218 begins at a junction with US 19, in Marion County, just east of Worthington (north and east of the West Fork River). From its southern terminus it the route runs northerly along Helens Run for about 3.0 miles (4.8 km) until it reaches Idamay. From that census-designated place, the route continues northerly for about 1.3 miles (2.1 km), until it reaches U.S. Route 250 (US 250 / Husky Highway) in Farmington.

Within the town of Farmington, WV 218 runs easterly for a short 0.3 miles (0.48 km) along the south bank of the Buffalo Creek and concurrent with US 250 before heading north. After crossing the creek, the route continues northerly along the Little Laurel Run through town and beyond, for about 1.6 miles (2.6 km). About 0.3 miles (0.48 km) north of headwaters of the Little Laurel Run, WV 218 reaches the west bank of Dunkard Mill Run. After running a short distance along the west bank, the route crosses that stream just above its confluence with Little Dunkard Mill Run Heading north the route crosses Little Dunkard Mill Run and then continues northerly for about 4.0 miles (6.4 km) along the streams east bank, past its headwaters, until it turns easterly and reaches Basnetteville. (From just south of Dunkard Mill Run to Basnettville, WV 281 is also known as Jamison Road.)

In Basnettville, WV 218 crosses the Paw Paw Creek and then turns briefly northwest for about 1.0 mile (1.6 km), along the northwest bank of the Paw Paw Creek, on its way to Fairview and is named Paw Paw Creek Road. Once it reaches Fairview, the route is signed as Main Street, until it crosses Bennefield Prong and turns north again. Continuing northerly, and signed as Jefferson Street (until it leaves Fairview), the route crossed back over Bennefield Prong and the runs along its east bank. North of Fairview the route is named Daybrook Road. It runs northerly and then northeasterly until it leaves Marion County and enters Monongalia County.

Continuing northeasterly along the east bank of Bennefield Prong (and still signed as Daybrook Road), WB 218 passes the stream's headwaters turn north once again to run northerly until it reaches the south bank of Dunkard Creek, Just east of Blacksville. (The route from Fairview to Blacksville is about 11.2 miles [18.0 km].) The route then turns west to run concurrently with West Virginia Route 7 (WV 7/Mason-Dixon Highway). A few blocks after entering Blacksville, the route turns north one more time, ending its concurrency with WV 7. Continuing northerly (and again named Daybrook Road), the route arrives at its northern terminus at the northern city limits of Blacksville within a few more blocks. The city limits are at the West Virginia-Pennsylvania state line (which is also the Mason–Dixon line). The road continues north as Pennsylvania Route 218 towards Spraggs and Waynesburg.

== Major intersections ==
County	Location	mi	km	Destinations	Notes
Marion				US 19 – Worthington, Enterprise, Monongah	Southern terminus
Marion	Farmington			US 250 north – Mannington	south end of US 250 concurrency
Marion	Farmington			US 250 south – Fairmont	north end of US 250 concurrency
Monongalia				WV 7 east (Mason-Dixon Highway) – Pentress	south end of WV 7 concurrency
Monongalia	Blacksville			WV 7 west (Mason-Dixon Highway) – Wana, Wadestown	north end of WV 7 concurrency
Monongalia	Blacksville			PA 218 north – Spraggs, Waynesburg	Northern terminus; Pennsylvania state line
1.000 mi = 1.609 km; 1.000 km = 0.621 mi: Concurrency terminus

== See also ==
- List of state highways in West Virginia
- List of highways numbered 218
