= Dunbar, Nebraska =

- Village
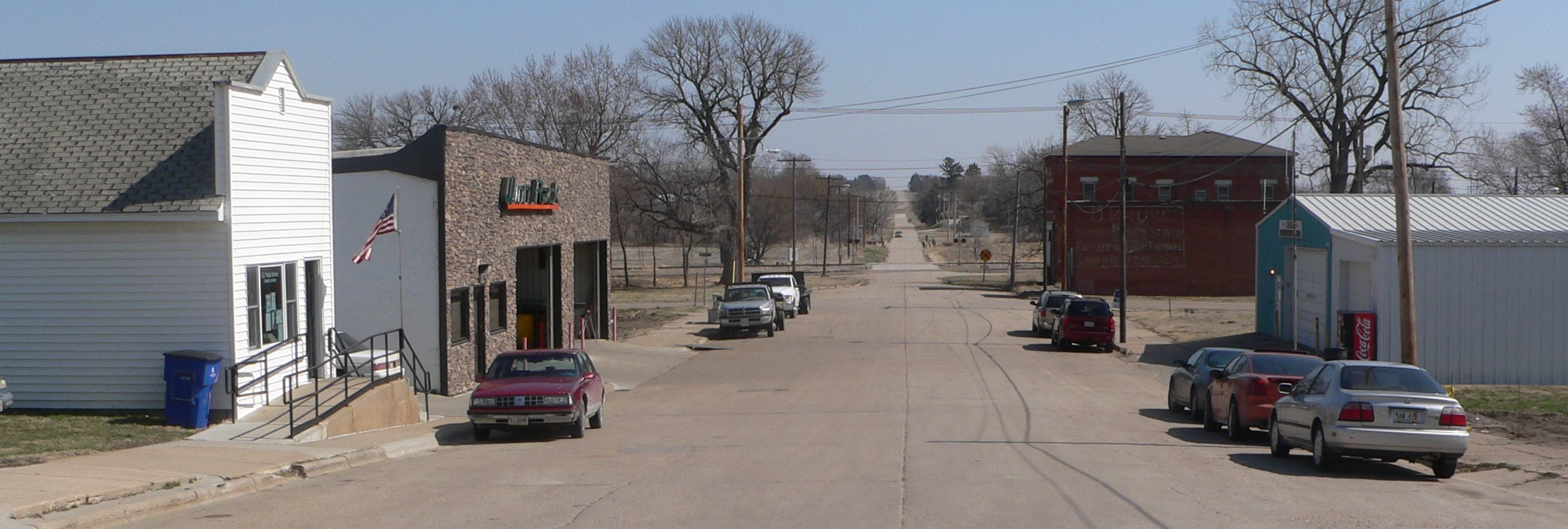
- Downtown Dunbar.

- Location of Dunbar, Nebraska
- Coordinates: 40°40′07″N 96°01′51″W
- Country: United States
- State: Nebraska
- County: Otoe

Area
  - Total: 0.23 sq mi (0.60 km^{2})
  - Land: 0.23 sq mi (0.60 km^{2})
  - Water: 0 sq mi (0.00 km^{2})
- Elevation: 1,083 ft (330 m)

Population (2020)
  - Total: 165
  - Density: 716.7/sq mi (276.71/km^{2})
- Time zone: UTC-6 (Central (CST))
  - Summer (DST): UTC-5 (CDT)
- ZIP code: 68346
- Area code: 402
- FIPS code: 31-13855
- GNIS feature ID: 2398752
- Website: www.dunbarnebraska.com

Dunbar is a village in Otoe County, Nebraska, United States. The population was 165 at the 2020 census.

== Geography ==
According to the United States Census Bureau, the village has a total area of 0.23 square miles (0.60 km^{2}), all land.

== Demographics ==
Historical population
Census	Pop.	Note	%±
1900	208		—
1910	216		3.8%
1920	312		44.4%
1930	292		−6.4%
1940	336		15.1%
1950	228		−32.1%
1960	232		1.8%
1970	252		8.6%
1980	216		−14.3%
1990	171		−20.8%
2000	237		38.6%
2010	187		−21.1%
2020	165		−11.8%
U.S. Decennial Census

=== 2010 census ===
As of the census of 2010, there were 187 people, 70 households, and 50 families residing in the village. The population density was 813.0 inhabitants per square mile (313.9/km^{2}). There were 77 housing units at an average density of 334.8 per square mile (129.3/km^{2}). The racial makeup of the village was 98.9% White, 0.5% Asian, and 0.5% from other races. Hispanic or Latino of any race were 1.6% of the population.

There were 70 households, of which 37.1% had children under the age of 18 living with them, 57.1% were married couples living together, 8.6% had a female householder with no husband present, 5.7% had a male householder with no wife present, and 28.6% were non-families. 18.6% of all households were made up of individuals, and 10% had someone living alone who was 65 years of age or older. The average household size was 2.67 and the average family size was 3.14.

The median age in the village was 38.5 years. 25.7% of residents were under the age of 18; 7.5% were between the ages of 18 and 24; 28.3% were from 25 to 44; 28.3% were from 45 to 64; and 10.2% were 65 years of age or older. The gender makeup of the village was 50.3% male and 49.7% female.

=== 2000 census ===
As of the census of 2000, there were 237 people, 79 households, and 63 families residing in the village. The population density was 957.4 inhabitants per square mile (369.7/km^{2}). There were 81 housing units at an average density of 327.2 per square mile (126.3/km^{2}). The racial makeup of the village was 97.05% White, 0.42% Native American, and 2.53% from two or more races. Hispanic or Latino of any race were 0.42% of the population.

There were 79 households, out of which 43.0% had children under the age of 18 living with them, 70.9% were married couples living together, 6.3% had a female householder with no husband present, and 19.0% were non-families. 16.5% of all households were made up of individuals, and 8.9% had someone living alone who was 65 years of age or older. The average household size was 3.00 and the average family size was 3.41.

In the village, the population was spread out, with 34.6% under the age of 18, 5.9% from 18 to 24, 30.4% from 25 to 44, 21.5% from 45 to 64, and 7.6% who were 65 years of age or older. The median age was 32 years. For every 100 females, there were 102.6 males. For every 100 females age 18 and over, there were 101.3 males.

As of 2000 the median income for a household in the village was $48,036, and the median income for a family was $50,417. Males had a median income of $31,563 versus $26,875 for females. The per capita income for the village was $15,495. About 16.4% of families and 11.6% of the population were below the poverty line, including 10.6% of those under the age of eighteen and 21.1% of those 65 or over.

== History ==
Dunbar was founded in 1856 by John Dunbar on the intersection of the properties of John Dunbar, T. H. Dunbar, J. Wilson, and John McGinley. It was originally known as Wilson until 1856 when it was renamed for the oldest resident and recognized founder. Dunbar was a large freighting depot for goods traveling west out of Nebraska City. The first railroad was built in Dunbar in 1869 when the Midland Pacific Railway and Burlington and Missouri River Railroads reached Nebraska City. By the 1880s, the town contained a grocery, general store, restaurant, boarding house, two hotels, two liveries, five churches, pharmacy, lumberyard, two banks, barbershop, two saloons, dentist, optometrist. In 1884 and 1888 two fires occurred, prompting the usage of brick and mortar. About 1 mile (1.6 km) south of Dunbar, the Delaware (named for the township) Cemetery was constructed. The earliest marked grave being in 1884.

In 1926, Dunbar observed its 70th birthday. A boulder was placed in memory of John Dunbar. The Nebraska City High School Band performed a concert and other festivities continued into the evening.

The flooding of Wilson Creek, Fox Creek, and several other tributaries on May 8, 1950, devastated the village. Nine buildings were washed away, the rest of the buildings were nearly destroyed, and two children were killed. In 1965, the Dunbar bypass was finished, greatly damaging the businesses of Dunbar, the population was decimated and the economy plummeted. The three mile stretch through Dunbar was noted as the worst from Chicago to Denver

=== Train derailment and State v. Hoffman ===
On January 11, 1887, at 11:30 p.m., David Hoffman and James Bell derailed a passenger train 1.5 miles (2.4 km) north of Dunbar. The engineer was killed, and two people were severely injured. The train was carrying $17,000 in silver. The two were arrested the next day. Hoffman was charged with first degree murder and sent to the gallows, while Bell was sentenced to ten years of hard labor in exchange for his testimony. On Friday, July 22, 1887, at 10:32, David Hoffman became the first person legally executed in Otoe County.

== Notable people ==
- Sam Francis, NFL player
- George H. Heinke – Congressman born on a farm nearby
- William Henry Harrison, Wyoming state representative and Pine Bluffs, Wyoming mayor
