= Wyoming Highway 214 =

State highway in Wyoming, United States

Wyoming Highway 214
- Carpenter Road
- WYO 214 highlighted in red

Route information
- Maintained by WYDOT
- Length: 8.39 mi (13.50 km)

Major junctions
- South end: Laramie CR 203-1 in Carpenter
- North end: I-80 / US 30; WYO 213

Location
- Country: United States
- State: Wyoming
- Counties: Laramie

Highway system
- Wyoming State Highway System; Interstate; US; State
| ← WYO 213 | → WYO 215 |

Wyoming Highway 214 (WYO 214) is a 8.39-mile-long (13.50 km) state highway in the southeastern part of Laramie County, Wyoming named Carpenter Road, that provides travel between Interstate 80/U.S. Highway 30 and the Town of Carpenter.

== Route description ==
Wyoming Highway 214 begins its south end in Carpenter at Laramie County Route 203-1 (Chalk Bluffs Rd.) WYO 214 heads due north past the eastern side of town. WYO 214 travels north to an end at Interstate 80/U.S. Highway 30 Exit 386. North of the interchange, Wyoming Highway 213 takes over north to Burns.

== History ==
Wyoming Highway 214 may have formerly connected to Old Colorado State Highway 155.

== Major intersections ==
The entire route is in Laramie County.

| Location | mi | km | Destinations | Notes |
|---|---|---|---|---|
| Carpenter | 0.00 | 0.00 | Laramie County Route 203-1 | Southern Terminus of WYO 214 |
| | 8.39 | 13.50 | I-80 / US 30; WYO 213 | Northern Terminus of WYO 214; Southern Terminus of WYO 213 |
1.000 mi = 1.609 km; 1.000 km = 0.621 mi
