= Wyoming's 7th House of Representatives district =

American legislative district

Wyoming's 7th State House of Representatives district
- Wyoming's 7th House of Representatives district as of 2022
Representative
Bob Nicholas; R–Cheyenne
- Demographics: 85% White; 1% Black; 10% Hispanic; 1% Asian; 1% Native American; 2% Multiracial
- Population (2022): 8,209

Wyoming's 7th House of Representatives district is one of 62 districts in the Wyoming House of Representatives. The district encompasses part of Laramie County. It is represented by Republican Representative Bob Nicholas of Cheyenne.

In 1992, the state of Wyoming switched from electing state legislators by county to a district-based system.

== List of members representing the district ==
Representative	Party	Term	Note
Ace Baty	Republican	1993 – 1995	Elected in 1992. Re-elected in 1994. Died in 1995.
Tony Ross	Republican	1995 – 2005	Appointed in 1995. Re-elected in 1996. Re-elected in 1998. Re-elected in 2000. Re-elected in 2002.
Doug Samuelson	Republican	2005 – 2009	Elected in 2004. Re-elected in 2006.
Bryan Pedersen	Republican	2009 – 2013	Elected in 2008. Re-elected in 2010.
Sue Wilson	Republican	2013 – 2023	Elected in 2012. Re-elected in 2014. Re-elected in 2016. Re-elected in 2018. Re-elected in 2020.
Bob Nicholas	Republican	2023 – present	Elected in 2022. Re-elected in 2024.

== Recent election results ==
=== 2014 ===
House district 7 general election
Party	Candidate	Votes	%
Republican	Sue Wilson (Incumbent)	3,386	98.91%
Write-ins		37	1.08%
Total votes		3,423	100.0%
Invalid or blank votes		825	
Republican hold			

=== 2016 ===
House district 7 general election
Party	Candidate	Votes	%
Republican	Sue Wilson (Incumbent)	4,782	98.49%
Write-ins		73	1.50%
Total votes		4,855	100.0%
Invalid or blank votes		1,167	
Republican hold			

=== 2018 ===
House district 7 general election
Party	Candidate	Votes	%
Republican	Sue Wilson (Incumbent)	4,283	98.45%
Write-ins		67	1.54%
Total votes		4,350	100.0%
Invalid or blank votes		923	
Republican hold			

=== 2020 ===
House district 7 general election
Party	Candidate	Votes	%
Republican	Sue Wilson (Incumbent)	5,804	97.57%
Write-ins		144	2.42%
Total votes		5,948	100.0%
Invalid or blank votes		846	
Republican hold			

=== 2022 ===
House district 7 general election
Party	Candidate	Votes	%
Republican	Bob Nicholas (Incumbent)	2,043	60.87%
Democratic	Jordan Evans	1,282	38.20%
Write-ins		31	0.92%
Total votes		3,356	100.0%
Invalid or blank votes		75	
Republican hold			

=== 2024 ===
House district 7 general election
Party	Candidate	Votes	%
Republican	Bob Nicholas (Incumbent)	2,791	64.90%
Democratic	Jordan Evans	1,456	33.86%
Write-ins		53	1.23%
Total votes		4,300	100.0%
Invalid or blank votes		127	
Republican hold			

== Historical district boundaries ==
Map	Description	Apportionment Plan	Notes
	Laramie County (part)	1992 Apportionment Plan	
	Laramie County (part)	2002 Apportionment Plan	
	Laramie County (part)	2012 Apportionment Plan	
