= Justin Fornstrom =

American politician

Member of the Wyoming House of Representatives from the 10th district
- Incumbent
- Assumed office December 16, 2025
- Preceded by: John Eklund Jr.

Personal details
- Born: Falls Church, Virginia
- Party: Republican
- Education: University of Wyoming (BA)

Justin Fornstrom is an American politician. He was appointed to fill the vacancy left in the 10th district of the Wyoming House of Representatives caused by the death of John Eklund Jr. in December 2025.

== Biography ==
Justin Fornstrom was born in Falls Church, Virginia. He graduated from high school in 1990. He received a bachelor's degree from the University of Wyoming in 1995. On June 27, 2015, he married Kara Brighton. Together, they had a daughter. Fornstrom is Catholic.

Fornstrom was first elected mayor of Pine Bluffs in 2021. In 2024, Fornstrom was re-elected mayor, after running unopposed in both the primary and general election.

In November 2025, State Representative John Eklund Jr. died in office. Fornstrom was among the three candidates chosen by the Laramie County Republican Party to fill the vacancy in the 10th state House district left by Eklund's death. Fornstrom was appointed from among the three candidates by the Laramie County commissioners on December 6. He was sworn into office on December 16. Following his swearing in, he was appointed to serve on the following committees: Joint Agriculture, State and Public Lands & Water Resources Committee, and the Select Water Committee.

Fornstrom won the 2026 Republican primary for re-election unopposed.
