= Boyd Wiggam =

American politician

Member-elect of the Wyoming House of Representatives from the 9th district
- Assuming office January 2027
- Succeeding: Landon Brown

Personal details
- Party: Republican

Boyd Wiggam is an American politician. A member of the Republican Party, he is the member-elect for the 9th district of the Wyoming House of Representatives.
