= Lori Millin =

American politician (born 1969)

Minority Caucus Chairman of the Wyoming House of Representatives
- In office 2009–2010

Member of the Wyoming House of Representatives from the 8th district
- In office 2007 – January 3, 2011
- Preceded by: Larry Meuli
- Succeeded by: Bob Nicholas

Personal details
- Born: Lori Ann Millin; September 4, 1969 (age 57) Aberdeen, South Dakota, U.S.
- Party: Democratic
- Spouse(s): John Thomas Garrison (m. 2019)
- Children: 3
- Education: Presentation College
- Profession: Politician, surgical first assistant

Lori Ann Millin (born September 4, 1969) is an American politician who served in the Wyoming House of Representatives from 2007 to 2011, representing the 8th district as a Democrat. She served as Minority Caucus Chairman of the Wyoming House of Representatives from 2009 to 2010.

== Early life and education ==
Millin was born in Aberdeen, South Dakota on September 4, 1969. She graduated from the Surgical Technology Program at Presentation College in 1988.

== Career ==
Millin worked as a surgical technologist for the Memorial Hospital of Laramie County/United Medical Center from 1988 to 1993. She also worked as a surgical technologist/surgical first assistant for Yellowstone Surgery Center from 1993 to 1996. Millin has been a self-employed surgical first assistant since 1996.

Millin served in the Wyoming House of Representatives from 2007 to 2011. (Note: According to the Wyoming Legislature, Millin served from 2007 to 2010.) She represented the 8th (Note: According to Ballotpedia and Vote Smart, Millin represented the 5th district.) district of Wyoming as a Democrat. Millin served as Minority Caucus Chairman of the Wyoming House of Representatives from 2009 to 2010.

During her time in office, Millin served on the following committees:

- Management Audit Committee (2007–2008)
- House Journal (2007–2008)
- House Labor, Health and Social Services (2007–2010)
- Select Committee on Legislative Process (2007–2008)
- Select Committee on Legislative Technology (2007–2008)
- House Travel, Recreation, Wildlife and Cultural Resources (2009–2010)
- Select Committee on Legislative Technology and Process (2009–2010)
- Department of Health Advisory Council (2009–2010)
- State Office Building Exterior Design Oversight Committee (2009–2010)
- NCSL - Legislative Effectiveness (2009–2010)

Millin was succeeded by Republican Bob Nicholas.

Millin was employed as the office manager at a New York life insurance company.

== Political positions ==
During her tenure in the Wyoming Legislature, Millin introduced a bill that would ban indoor smoking statewide. According to the Wyoming Tribune Eagle, Millin received a death threat for doing so.

Millin received an A− rating from the NRA Political Victory Fund (NRA-PVF) in 2010.

== Personal life ==
Millin married Thomas Garrison in Cheyenne, Wyoming on June 1, 2019. She has three children.

Millin is a member of the Cheyenne League of Women Voters, the Women's Civic League of Cheyenne, the Wyoming Guardianship Corporation Board, and the Wyoming Youth Challenge Foundation Board. She has also served as president of the Wyoming Association of Surgical Technologists.

Millin was elected vice president of the National Board of Surgical Technology and Surgical Assisting in 2012.

Millin is Lutheran.

== Notes ==
Wyoming House of Representatives
Preceded by Larry Meuli	Member of the Wyoming House of Representatives from the 8th district 2007–2011	Succeeded by Bob Nicholas
Wyoming House of Representatives
Preceded by —	Minority Caucus Chairman of the Wyoming House of Representatives; 2009–2010	Succeeded by —
