= Steve Johnson (Wyoming politician) =

American politician

Member of the Wyoming House of Representatives from the 8th district
- Incumbent
- Assumed office January 6, 2025
- Preceded by: David Zwonitzer
- Succeeded by: Luke Reiner (elect)

Personal details
- Party: Republican Party

Steve Johnson is an American politician who is a member of the Wyoming House of Representatives from the 8th district. He defeated incumbent Republican David Zwonitzer in a tight primary in 2024. A Republican from Cheyenne, he aligns himself with the Wyoming Freedom Caucus, a further-right faction of the Wyoming GOP.

== Electoral history ==
2024 Wyoming House of Representatives District 8 Republican primary
Party	Candidate	Votes	%
Republican	Steve Johnson	1,183	49.29%
Republican	David Zwonitzer (inc.)	1,135	47.29%
Republican	Cayd Batchelor	78	3.25%
Write-in		4	0.17%
Valid ballots		2,400	98.24%
Invalid or blank votes		43	1.76
Total votes		2,443	100.00%

2024 Wyoming House of Representatives District 8 general election
Party	Candidate	Votes	%
Republican	Steve Johnson	4,229	92.46%
Write-in		345	7.54%
Valid ballots		4,574	85.70%
Invalid or blank votes		763	14.30%
Total votes		5,337	100.00%
