= Laramie County School District Number 2 =

Public school district

Laramie County School District #2 is a public school district based in Pine Bluffs, Wyoming, United States.

== Geography ==
Laramie County School District #2 serves the eastern portion of Laramie County, including the following communities:

- Incorporated places
  - Town of Albin
  - Town of Burns
  - Town of Pine Bluffs
- Unincorporated places
  - Carpenter
  - Egbert
  - Hillsdale
  - Meriden

== Schools ==
- Grades 7-12
  - Burns Junior/Senior High School
  - Pine Bluffs Junior/Senior High School
- Grades K-6
  - Albin Elementary School
  - Carpenter Elementary School
  - Pine Bluffs Elementary School
  - Burns Elementary School (formerly West Elementary School)

== Student demographics ==
The following figures are as of October 1, 2008.

- Total District Enrollment: 841
- Student enrollment by gender
  - Male: 445 (52.91%)
  - Female: 396 (47.09%)
- Student enrollment by ethnicity
  - White (not Hispanic): 731 (86.92%)
  - Hispanic: 85 (10.11%)
  - American Indian or Alaskan Native: 12 (1.43%)
  - Asian or Pacific Islander: 7 (0.83%)
  - Black (not Hispanic): 6 (0.71%)

== See also ==
- List of school districts in Wyoming
