= Wyoming Highway 218 =

Former state highway in Wyoming, United States

Wyoming Highway 218
- Harriman Road
- WYO 218 highlighted in red

Route information
- Maintained by WYDOT
- Length: 1.77 mi (2.85 km)

Major junctions
- South end: CR 102 south of Granite Canon
- North end: I-80 / US 30 in Granite Canon

Location
- Country: United States
- State: Wyoming
- Counties: Laramie

Highway system
- Wyoming State Highway System; Interstate; US; State
← WYO 217	→ WYO 219

Wyoming Highway 218 (WYO 218) was an American state highway in southwestern Laramie County, Wyoming, east of Buford and west of Cheyenne. WYO 218, named Harriman Road, traveled from Interstate 80 and US 30 (Exit 342) south for only 1.77 miles (2.85 km) as state maintenance ended there. The roadway continued south as Laramie County Route 102 (Harriman Road) to the Colorado State Line and the town of Harriman. From there the roadway continues in Colorado as Larimer County Route 37, named Red Mountain Road, to US 287. Mileposts along WYO 218 increased from north to south.

The route was decommissioned in 2009; all state route marker signs have been removed, and the route no longer appears on the Wyoming Official State Highway Map.

== Major intersections ==
The entire route was in Granite Canon, Laramie County.

mi	km	Destinations	Notes
0.00	0.00	CR 102 (Harriman Road)	Southern terminus WYO 218
1.77	2.85	I-80 / US 30	Northern terminus WYO 218; Exit 342 (I-80 / US 30)
1.000 mi = 1.609 km; 1.000 km = 0.621 mi
