= Wyoming's 9th House of Representatives district =

American legislative district

Wyoming's 9th State House of Representatives district
- Wyoming's 9th House of Representatives district as of 2022
Representative
Landon Brown; R–Cheyenne
- Demographics: 72% White; 4% Black; 16% Hispanic; 2% Asian; 3% Other; 3% Multiracial
- Population (2022): 9,966

Wyoming's 9th House of Representatives district is one of 62 districts in the Wyoming House of Representatives. The district encompasses part of Laramie County. It is represented by Republican Representative Landon Brown of Cheyenne.

In 1992, the state of Wyoming switched from electing state legislators by county to a district-based system.

== List of members representing the district ==
Representative	Party	Term	Note
Wayne Johnson	Republican	1993 – 2005	Elected in 1992. Re-elected in 1994. Re-elected in 1996. Re-elected in 1998. Re-elected in 2000. Re-elected in 2002.
Bryan Pedersen	Republican	2005 – 2006	Elected in 2004. Resigned in 2006.
David Zwonitzer	Republican	2006 – 2017	Appointed in 2006. Re-elected in 2006. Re-elected in 2008. Re-elected in 2010. Re-elected in 2012. Re-elected in 2014.
Landon Brown	Republican	2017 – present	Elected in 2016. Re-elected in 2018. Re-elected in 2020. Re-elected in 2022. Re-elected in 2024.

== Recent election results ==
=== 2014 ===
House district 9 general election
Party	Candidate	Votes	%
Republican	David Zwonitzer (Incumbent)	1,444	56.60%
Democratic	Mike Weiland	1,091	42.76%
Write-ins		16	0.62%
Total votes		2,551	100.0%
Invalid or blank votes		92	
Republican hold			

=== 2016 ===
House district 9 general election
Party	Candidate	Votes	%
Republican	Landon Brown	2,299	58.33%
Democratic	Mike Weiland	1,639	41.58%
Write-ins		3	0.07%
Total votes		3,941	100.0%
Invalid or blank votes		212	
Republican hold			

=== 2018 ===
House district 9 general election
Party	Candidate	Votes	%
Republican	Landon Brown (Incumbent)	2,594	98.70%
Write-ins		34	1.29%
Total votes		2,628	100.0%
Invalid or blank votes		701	
Republican hold			

=== 2020 ===
House district 9 general election
Party	Candidate	Votes	%
Republican	Landon Brown (Incumbent)	3,798	95.98%
Write-ins		159	4.01%
Total votes		3,957	100.0%
Invalid or blank votes		632	
Republican hold			

=== 2022 ===
House district 9 general election
Party	Candidate	Votes	%
Republican	Landon Brown (Incumbent)	2,014	71.24%
Democratic	Stephen D. Latham	775	27.41%
Write-ins		38	1.34%
Total votes		2,827	100.0%
Invalid or blank votes		98	
Republican hold			

=== 2024 ===
House district 9 general election
Party	Candidate	Votes	%
Republican	Landon Brown (Incumbent)	3,453	92.59%
Write-ins		276	7.40%
Total votes		3,729	100.0%
Invalid or blank votes		578	
Republican hold			

== Historical district boundaries ==
Map	Description	Apportionment Plan	Notes
	Laramie County (part)	1992 Apportionment Plan	
	Laramie County (part)	2002 Apportionment Plan	
	Laramie County (part)	2012 Apportionment Plan	
