= Cheyenne Transit =

Mass transportation provider in Wyoming, US

Cheyenne Transit Program
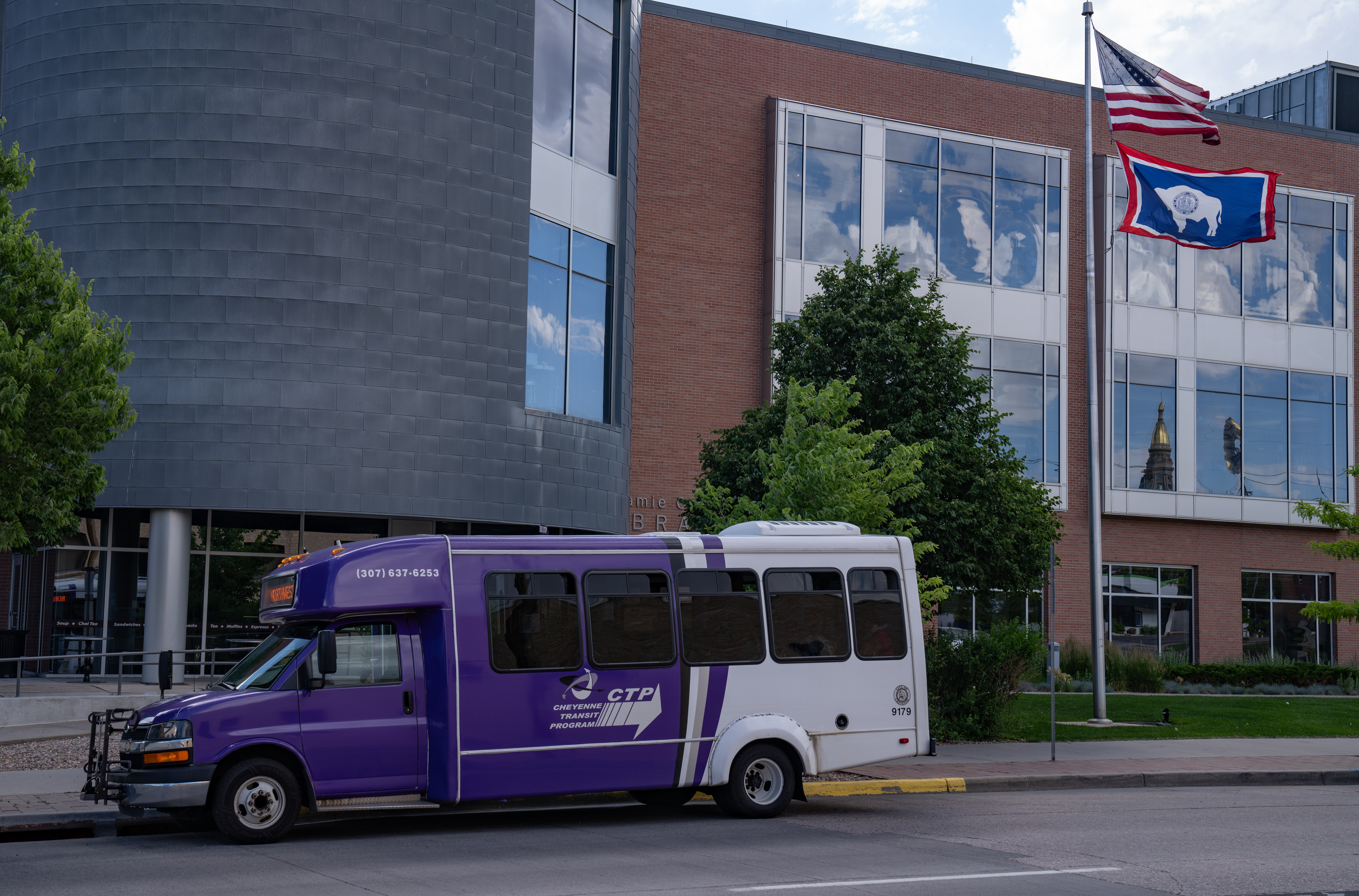
- Cheyenne Transit Program bus outside the Laramie County Library
- Headquarters: 322 West Lincolnway
- Locale: Cheyenne, Wyoming
- Service area: Laramie County, Wyoming
- Service type: bus service, paratransit, microtransit
- Routes: 5
- Stations: Main Transfer Station @ West 18th St and O'Neil Ave
- Website: CheyenneTransit.org/Home

Cheyenne Transit Program is the primary provider of mass transportation in Cheyenne, Wyoming. Five routes are provided by the agency, four of which run from Monday through Saturday. It offers fixed-route service, on-demand service, and complimentary ADA paratransit service. Starting in 2009, the city began a comprehensive process to increase ridership by adding bus stops and building shelters.

== History ==
The Cheyenne Transit Program mostly suspended services during the COVID-19 pandemic. However, unlike other agencies in the area, the suspension lasted significantly longer, until September 5, 2023, with four bus routes put into effect. When transit returned to the city, the system was improved with more direct routes and free fares for fixed-route service. Despite moving to a fare-free operation, the city will save money by no longer requiring fare boxes, nor any of the other associated expenses of a fare-based system. Passengers also no longer need to bring exact change with them to use the buses.

=== Previous routes and old Transfer Station location ===
In the past especially prior to the COVID-19 pandemic, there were six bus routes including

- East (to east Walmart)
- Northwest (to Frontier Mall)
- Northeast (to Kingsoopers)
- West (to Old West Museum and the Comea Shelter)
- South (to LCCC)
- Downtown (a loop mainly around Downtown Cheyenne that also went to CRMC and the VA hospital).

Back at this time, the Transfer Station was located on W 17th St and Capitol Avenue next to the Cheyenne Municipal Parking facility in Downtown Cheyenne. Fares which most people had to pay in order to ride the bus were US$1.00 fee per ride; transfers to other buses were free. In the late 2010s, that fare was raised to US$1.50.

At a certain point between 2021 and mid-2023, an Express route from Downtown Cheyenne to Walmart on Dell Range Blvd was provided. In 2023, two routes between Downtown Cheyenne and the north Walmart on Dell Range Blvd were put into effect along with four micro-transit zones for extended coverage.

As of 2026, Cheyenne Transit Program was using its own dedicated website, CheyenneTransit.org/, as the main place to display transit information. Previously, they primarily used a section on the main Cheyenne City website.

== Future ==
Plans are currently in place to eventually extend service farther into the evening hours as well as on Sundays although fixed-route service would stop at 6:00 PM on weekdays and not operate on Sundays. Instead, Micro-transit service is planned to eventually operate during the extended service times. There are plans to acquire vans for para-transit services.

There are also plans to eventually relocate Cheyenne Transit Program's office from its current location on W Lincolnway to 1800 Westland Rd at what is a former Union Pacific Railroad facility. This would place the offices closer to the maintenance facility along Old Happy Jack Road, and it is set to serve as an inter-modal hub that could provide intercity bus service among other transit services.

CTP is also looking to eventually move the main transfer point to one of two locations:

- 611 W 19th St on the southwest corner of 19th St and O'Neil Ave, or
- the southeast corner of E 19th St and Capitol Ave.

== Services ==
=== Fixed-Route Service ===
As of 2026, Cheyenne's current fixed-routes include:

- Express/Summer Circular
  - This experimental route is runs from June 1, 2026 to August 31, 2026.
  - It runs during peak hours Monday to Friday only. Peak hours are 8:15 AM, 9:15 AM, 10:15 AM, 3:15 PM, 4:15 PM, and 5:15 PM.
  - It starts at the Stinson and W 17th St stop at :15 after the hour; it makes its way to the transfer center (:23), makes additional stops as it travels out to Storey Blvd, and continues its route to the Walmart on Dell Range Blvd. It then makes a non-stop trip to the Walmart on Livingston Avenue, before making additional stops on its way back to Stinson and W 17th St.
- South - South Greeley Hwy area to Walmart on Livingston Way
- East - E Lincolnway area to Walmart on Livingston Way
- Northeast - Pershing Blvd/Ridge Rd area to Walmart on Dell Range Blvd
- Northwest - Warren Ave/Yellowstone Rd area to Walmart on Dell Range Blvd

Each of the normal fixed route lines, South, East, Northeast, and Northwest, begin at the top of the hour at the Transfer Station (W 18th St and O'Neil Ave), and makes a loop to return about 10 minutes prior to the next hour. The buses meet at one of Cheyenne's two Walmarts (Livingston Ave and Dell Range Blvd) about 22 to 28 minutes after the hour where users can also transfer between two respective buses (South and East routes, or Northeast and Northwest routes). With the current design of the bus routes, the buses double back along their routes back to the Transfer Station.

Each bus identifies its route with a basic marquee on the front and right side of each bus. Bus stops are identified with a green sign and can sometimes be accompanied by plastic benches and/or green, metal bus shelters.

=== On-Demand Service ===
On-Demand trip requests can be put into play by anyone to get a ride to other locations and for most, this service costs US$1.50 per rider per trip. On Demand trip requests are required to be made 1 to 5 days in advance; reservations cannot be made on the same day you are riding. On Demand trips can either start from the closest bus stop to a hub, or can start from a hub to the closest bus stop to the desired destinations. Unlike the Paratransit service, On-Demand does not stop at the door/curb of a desired destination.

To use this service, personal details such as your name, date of birth, date of travel, and other important details are required to be provided.

=== ADA Complimentary Paratransit ===
The "curb-to curb" program is a dial-up transit taxi for those who are disabled, or those not close to a bus stop. The paratransit service runs on the same time-frame of a fixed-route, and within a 3/4th mile buffer. It's free to eligible riders who are within the 3/4-mile buffer, but will cost US$1.50 per trip for all trips outside of the 3/4-mile buffer.

== Fleet ==
As of 2023, Cheyenne Transit Program owns 23 vehicles to provide their services including vehicles made by Chevy, Ford, and Dodge. At this time, CTP's vehicles' years range from 2006 to 2020. The largest vehicle in the list carries about 27 passengers.

== See also ==
- Buses
- Bus transit in the US
