= List of highways numbered 219 =

The following highways are numbered 219:

== Canada ==
- Nova Scotia Route 219
- Prince Edward Island Route 219
- Quebec Route 219
- Saskatchewan Highway 219

== China ==
- China National Highway 219

== Costa Rica ==
- National Route 219

== India ==
- National Highway 219 (India)

== Japan ==
- Japan National Route 219

== United Kingdom ==
- A219 road
- B219 road

== United States ==
- U.S. Route 219
- Alabama State Route 219
- Arkansas Highway 219
- California State Route 219
- Connecticut Route 219
- Florida State Road 219 (former)
- Georgia State Route 219
- K-219 (Kansas highway)
- Kentucky Route 219
- Maine State Route 219
- M-219 (Michigan highway) (former)
- Minnesota State Highway 219
- Montana Secondary Highway 219
- New Mexico State Road 219
- Ohio State Route 219
- Oregon Route 219
- South Carolina Highway 219
- Tennessee State Route 219
- Texas State Highway 219
  - Texas State Highway Loop 219
- Utah State Route 219
- Wyoming Highway 219

Preceded by 218	Lists of highways 219	Succeeded by 220
