= Landon Brown =

American politician (born 1987)

Member of the Wyoming House of Representatives from the 9th district
- Incumbent
- Assumed office January 10, 2017
- Preceded by: David Zwonitzer
- Succeeded by: Boyd Wiggam (elect)

Personal details
- Born: February 26, 1987 (age 39) Fort Collins, Colorado, U.S.
- Party: Republican
- Spouse: Rachel Smith
- Education: Bellevue University; University of Wyoming
- Profession: Director of Annual Giving & Grants
- Website: brownforwyoming.com

Landon Brown (born February 26, 1987) is an American politician and a Republican member of the Wyoming House of Representatives representing District 9 since January 10, 2017.

== Elections ==
=== 2016 ===
When incumbent Republican Representative David Zwonitzer announced his run for the Wyoming Senate, Brown declared his candidacy for the seat. Brown defeated Kelly Sebastian in the Republican primary with 63% of the vote, and defeated Democrat Mike Weiland in the general election with 58% of the vote.

=== 2018 ===
Brown was unopposed in both the August 18, 2020, Republican primary and the November 6, 2018, general election, winning with 1,482 votes and 2,594 votes, respectively.

=== 2020 ===
Brown was unopposed in both the August 18, 2020, Republican primary and the November 3, 2020, general election, winning with 1,390 and 3,798 votes, respectively.
