= Luke Reiner =

American politician

Member of the Wyoming House of Representatives from the 8th district
- member-elect
- Assumed office January 4, 2027
- Preceded by: Steve Johnson

Personal details
- Party: Republican
- Website: Campaign website

Luke Reiner is an American politician. A member of the Republican Party, he is the member-elect of the Wyoming House of Representatives for the 8th district. He was elected at the 2026 election. He is a retired Major General from the United States Army.
