= Frontier School of the Bible =

Coordinates: 41°38′16″N 104°9′44″W

- Established: 1967
- Location: La Grange, Wyoming, USA
- Website: http://frontierbible.org

Frontier School of the Bible is a small Bible Institute located in La Grange, Wyoming, United States. It is a state approved, non-profit educational institution.

The school was founded by Rev. Richard LeBar and Rev. Dan Johnson on September 5, 1967. It currently offers a residential college experience with a variety of Christian service opportunities. The current president is Nelson Miles and the vice president is Bill Bagley.

After gaining a minimum of 102 credits and three years of study, students are eligible for a non-accredited Associate of Arts degree. Associate degree recipients may apply for a non-accredited Bachelor of Arts degree upon completion of an additional year of full-time ministry, language school, or an internship.

Doctrinally, the school endorses a literal approach to biblical hermeneutics resulting in dispensationalism, including adherence to pretribulationism and premillennialism.

== Notable alumni ==
- Ben Hornok, member of the Wyoming House of Representatives
