= Hillsdale, Wyoming =

Hillsdale
- Unincorporated community and census-designated place
- Location in Laramie County and the state of Wyoming
- Coordinates: 41°12′29″N 104°28′28″W
- Country: United States
- State: Wyoming
- County: Laramie

Area
  - Total: 0.85 sq mi (2.2 km^{2})
  - Land: 0.85 sq mi (2.2 km^{2})
  - Water: 0 sq mi (0 km^{2})
- Elevation: 5,640 ft (1,720 m)

Population (2020)
  - Total: 40
  - Density: 47/sq mi (18/km^{2})
- Time zone: UTC-7 (Mountain (MST))
  - Summer (DST): UTC-6 (MDT)
- ZIP codes: 82060
- GNIS feature ID: 2585081

Hillsdale is an unincorporated community and census-designated place in southeastern Laramie County, Wyoming, United States. As of the 2020 census, it had a population of 40. It lies along local roads east of the city of Cheyenne, the county seat of Laramie County. Although Hillsdale is unincorporated, it has a post office, with the ZIP code of 82060. Public education in the community of Hillsdale is provided by Laramie County School District #2.

Hillsdale was named for Lathrop Hills, a Surveyor for the Union Pacific Railroad who was killed nearby along Lodgepole Creek on June 11, 1867, while leading a party surveying a route of the Transcontinental Railroad.

Hillsdale was platted as a townsite in April 2013.

== Notable person ==
Kenny Sailors, American college and professional basketball player.
