= Pennsylvania Route 218 =

State highway in Greene County, Pennsylvania, US

Pennsylvania Route 218

Route information
- Maintained by PennDOT
- Length: 13.460 mi (21.662 km)

Major junctions
- South end: WV 218 at the West Virginia state line in Blacksville, WV
- North end: US 19 / PA 21 in Waynesburg

Location
- Country: United States
- State: Pennsylvania
- Counties: Greene

Highway system
- Pennsylvania State Route System; Interstate; US; State; Scenic; Legislative
← PA 217	→ US 219

Pennsylvania Route 218 (PA 218) is a 13.5-mile-long (21.7 km) state highway and spur route of PA 18 located in Greene County, Pennsylvania. The southern terminus is at the West Virginia state line at Blacksville, WV, where the road continues into that state as West Virginia Route 218 (WV 218). The northern terminus is at U.S. Route 19 (US 19)/PA 21 in Waynesburg, approximately 1 mile (1.6 km) east of PA 18.

== Route description ==
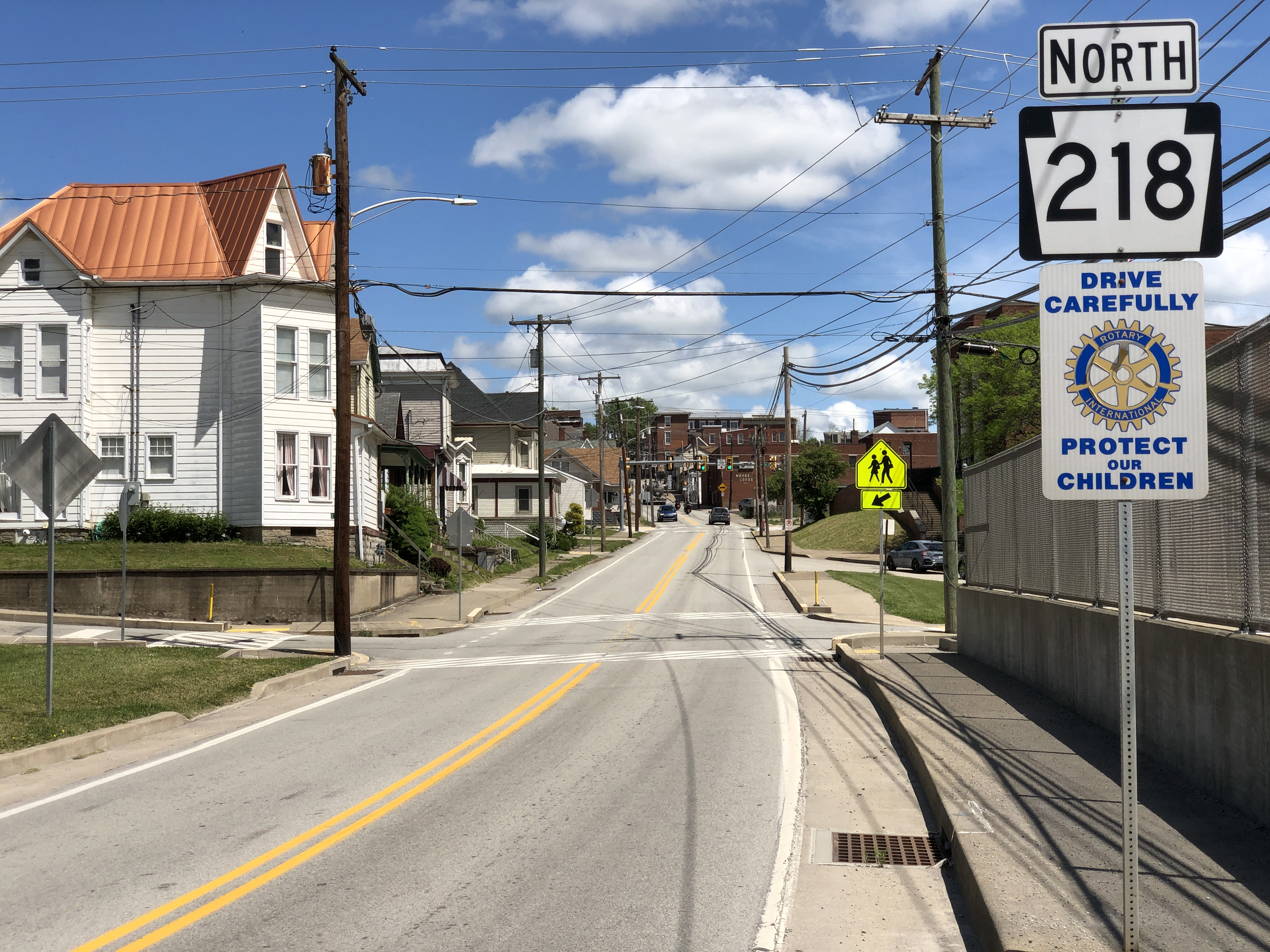
PA 218 northbound in Waynesburg

PA 218 begins at the West Virginia border in Wayne Township, where the road continues south into that state as WV 218. From the state line, the route heads north on two-lane undivided Smith Creek Road, passing through forested areas with a few clearings and rural homes. PA 218 continues through rural areas for several miles, passing through the community of Spraggs. The route continues through more forests and heads into Franklin Township. In Franklin Township, the road continues north through woodland with some farms and residences. PA 218 reaches the community of Blairtown and crosses the South Fork Tenmile Creek into the borough of Waynesburg. Here, the road becomes South Morgan Street and crosses over Norfolk Southern's Mon Line, heading into residential and commercial areas. PA 218 reaches its northern terminus at an intersection with US 19/PA 21 in the commercial center of Waynesburg.

== Major intersections ==
The entire route is in Greene County.

Location	mi	km	Destinations	Notes
Wayne Township	0.000	0.000	WV 218 south (Wades Run Road) – Blacksville	West Virginia state line; southern terminus
Waynesburg	13.380	21.533	US 19 south / PA 21 east (Greene Street)	
Waynesburg	13.460	21.662	US 19 north / PA 21 west (High Street)	Northern terminus
1.000 mi = 1.609 km; 1.000 km = 0.621 mi
