= Spraggs, Pennsylvania =

Unincorporated community in Pennsylvania, US

- Unincorporated community
- Location within Pennsylvania
- Coordinates: 39°46′50″N 80°12′58″W
- Country: United States
- State: Pennsylvania
- County: Greene
- Elevation: 1,063 ft (324 m)
- Time zone: UTC-5 (Eastern (EST))
  - Summer (DST): UTC-4 (EDT)
- ZIP code: 15362
- Area codes: 724, 878
- GNIS feature ID: 1204702

Spraggs is an unincorporated community in Greene County, Pennsylvania, United States. The community is located along Pennsylvania Route 218 8.2 miles (13.2 km) south of Waynesburg. Spraggs has a post office with ZIP code 15362, which opened on June 21, 1852.
