= Carpenter, Wyoming =

Carpenter
- Census-designated place
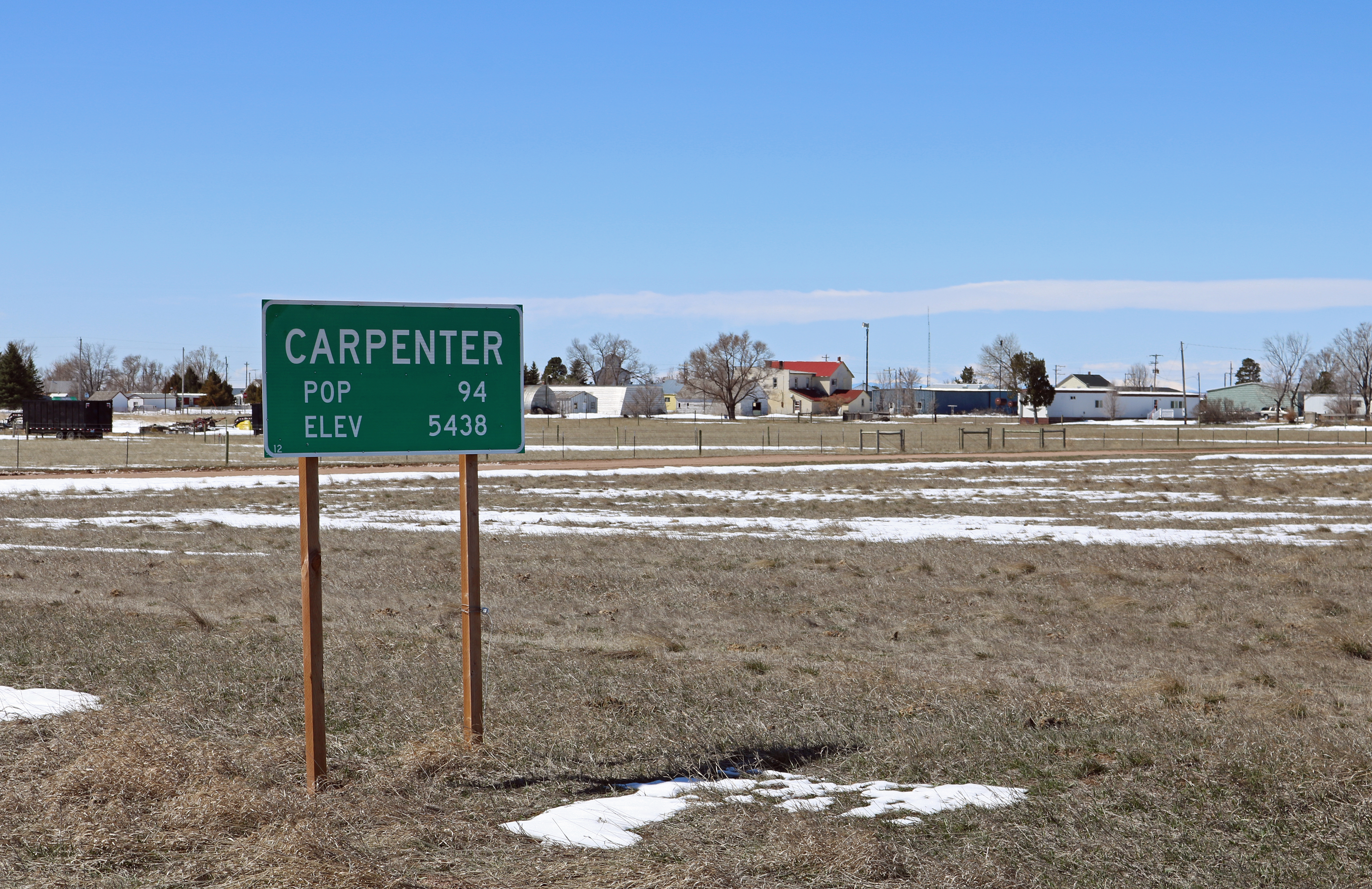
- Carpenter in 2016.

- Location in Laramie County and the state of Wyoming
- Coordinates: 41°02′44″N 104°22′00″W
- Country: United States
- State: Wyoming
- County: Laramie

Area
  - Total: 0.23 sq mi (0.6 km^{2})
  - Land: 0.23 sq mi (0.6 km^{2})
  - Water: 0 sq mi (0 km^{2})
- Elevation: 5,440 ft (1,660 m)

Population (2010)
  - Total: 94
  - Density: 410/sq mi (160/km^{2})
- Time zone: UTC-7 (Mountain (MST))
  - Summer (DST): UTC-6 (MDT)
- ZIP codes: 82054
- GNIS feature ID: 1586382

Carpenter is an unincorporated community and census-designated place in southeastern Laramie County, Wyoming, United States. As of the 2010 census it had a population of 94. It lies along WYO 214 east of the city of Cheyenne, the county seat of Laramie County and capital of Wyoming. Its elevation is 5,440 feet (1,658 m). Although Carpenter is unincorporated, it has had a post office since 1907, with the ZIP code of 82054.

== History ==
The community, formed in 1907 with a population of 15, was a rail stop on the Chicago, Burlington and Quincy Railroad. The now defunct rail road line ran from Hereford, Colorado through Arcola and Campstool, both now virtual ghost towns, through Carpenter then on to Cheyenne. In 1910, 50 people called Carpenter home.

Carpenter, Wyoming was named after James R. Carpenter (7 Aug 1867 - 27 Jan 1943), land developer. Carpenter was born as James Ross Carpenter, the second son of George Daniel Carpenter (1832 - 1881) and Margery Ann Pollock (1836 - 1920). Carpenter became the president and general manager of The Federal Land Company which opened up one hundred and forty-six thousand acres of land to settlers in Wyoming. Carpenter later became a Wyoming District Judge.

== Education ==
Public education in the community of Carpenter is provided by Laramie County School District #2. One of the district's campuses, Carpenter Elementary School (grades K-6), is located in Carpenter.

The latitude of Carpenter is 41.045N. The longitude is -104.366W.

== See also ==
Bindweed or Bluegrass - Carpenter Wyoming, then and now
