= Albin, Wyoming =

Town in Laramie County, Wyoming, United States

- Town
- Location of Albin in Laramie County, Wyoming.
- Coordinates: 41°25′01″N 104°06′06″W
- Country: United States
- State: Wyoming
- County: Laramie

Area
  - Total: 0.15 sq mi (0.38 km^{2})
  - Land: 0.15 sq mi (0.38 km^{2})
  - Water: 0 sq mi (0.00 km^{2})
- Elevation: 5,338 ft (1,627 m)

Population (2020)
  - Total: 169
  - Density: 1,404.5/sq mi (542.29/km^{2})
- Time zone: UTC-7 (Mountain (MST))
  - Summer (DST): UTC-6 (MDT)
- ZIP code: 82050
- Area code: 307
- GNIS feature ID: 2412343
- FIPS code: 56-00825

Albin is a town in Laramie County, Wyoming, United States. It is part of the Cheyenne Metropolitan Statistical Area. The population was 169 at the 2020 census.

The town was incorporated in 1930.

== Geography ==
Albin is located approximately 55 miles (89 km) east-northeast of Cheyenne along Wyoming Highway 216.

According to the United States Census Bureau, the town has a total area of 0.15 square miles (0.39 km^{2}), all land.

=== Climate ===
Climate data for Albin, Wyoming
Month	Jan	Feb	Mar	Apr	May	Jun	Jul	Aug	Sep	Oct	Nov	Dec	Year
Mean daily maximum °F (°C)	38.7 (3.7)	42.0 (5.6)	48.3 (9.1)	58.1 (14.5)	68.1 (20.1)	78.8 (26.0)	86.4 (30.2)	84.6 (29.2)	75.7 (24.3)	63.3 (17.4)	47.8 (8.8)	39.8 (4.3)	61.0 (16.1)
Mean daily minimum °F (°C)	15.4 (−9.2)	18.1 (−7.7)	22.5 (−5.3)	30.2 (−1.0)	40.1 (4.5)	49.0 (9.4)	55.4 (13.0)	53.9 (12.2)	44.9 (7.2)	34.4 (1.3)	23.5 (−4.7)	17.0 (−8.3)	33.7 (1.0)
Average precipitation inches (mm)	0.7 (18)	0.6 (15)	1.5 (38)	1.9 (48)	2.9 (74)	2.6 (66)	2.1 (53)	1.7 (43)	1.4 (36)	1.1 (28)	0.8 (20)	0.7 (18)	18.1 (460)
Source: Weatherbase

== Demographics ==
Historical population
Census	Pop.	Note	%±
1940	160		—
1950	208		30.0%
1960	172		−17.3%
1970	118		−31.4%
1980	128		8.5%
1990	120		−6.2%
2000	120		0.0%
2010	181		50.8%
2020	169		−6.6%
U.S. Decennial Census

=== 2010 census ===
As of the census of 2010, there were 181 people, 59 households, and 44 families residing in the town. The population density was 1,206.7 inhabitants per square mile (465.9/km^{2}). There were 71 housing units at an average density of 473.3 per square mile (182.7/km^{2}). The racial makeup of the town was 93.9% White, 0.6% Native American, 0.6% Asian, 4.4% from other races, and 0.6% from two or more races. Hispanic or Latino of any race were 34.3% of the population.

There were 59 households, of which 42.4% had children under the age of 18 living with them, 50.8% were married couples living together, 10.2% had a female householder with no husband present, 13.6% had a male householder with no wife present, and 25.4% were non-families. 22.0% of all households were made up of individuals, and 6.8% had someone living alone who was 65 years of age or older. The average household size was 3.07 and the average family size was 3.59.

The median age in the town was 28.1 years. 36.5% of residents were under the age of 18; 7.1% were between the ages of 18 and 24; 28.2% were from 25 to 44; 23.7% were from 45 to 64; and 4.4% were 65 years of age or older. The gender makeup of the town was 50.8% male and 49.2% female.

=== 2000 census ===
As of the census of 2000, there were 120 people, 54 households, and 32 families residing in the town. The population density was 850.6 people per square mile (330.9/km^{2}). There were 70 housing units at an average density of 496.2 per square mile (193.1/km^{2}). The racial makeup of the town was 95.83% White, 0.83% Native American, 0.83% Asian, 2.50% from other races. Hispanic or Latino of any race were 9.17% of the population.

There were 54 households, out of which 24.1% had children under the age of 18 living with them, 51.9% were married couples living together, 3.7% had a female householder with no husband present, and 38.9% were non-families. 37.0% of all households were made up of individuals, and 22.2% had someone living alone who was 65 years of age or older. The average household size was 2.22 and the average family size was 2.91.

In the town, the population was spread out, with 22.5% under the age of 18, 7.5% from 18 to 24, 20.0% from 25 to 44, 27.5% from 45 to 64, and 22.5% who were 65 years of age or older. The median age was 46 years. For every 100 females, there were 87.5 males. For every 100 females age 18 and over, there were 89.8 males.

The median income for a household in the town was $25,625, and the median income for a family was $38,750. Males had a median income of $26,000 versus $18,750 for females. The per capita income for the town was $13,174. There were 6.7% of families and 12.5% of the population living below the poverty line, including 19.0% of under eighteens and 31.3% of those over 64.

== Government ==
Kelly Krakow was elected mayor in 2025.

== Education ==
Public education in the town of Albin is provided by Laramie County School District #2. One of the district's campuses, Albin Elementary School, is located in the town and serves students in grades Kindergarten through six.

Albin made news in the regional media for a failed attempt to start a charter school in their town.
