= LaGrange, Wyoming =

Town in Goshen County, Wyoming, United States

- Town
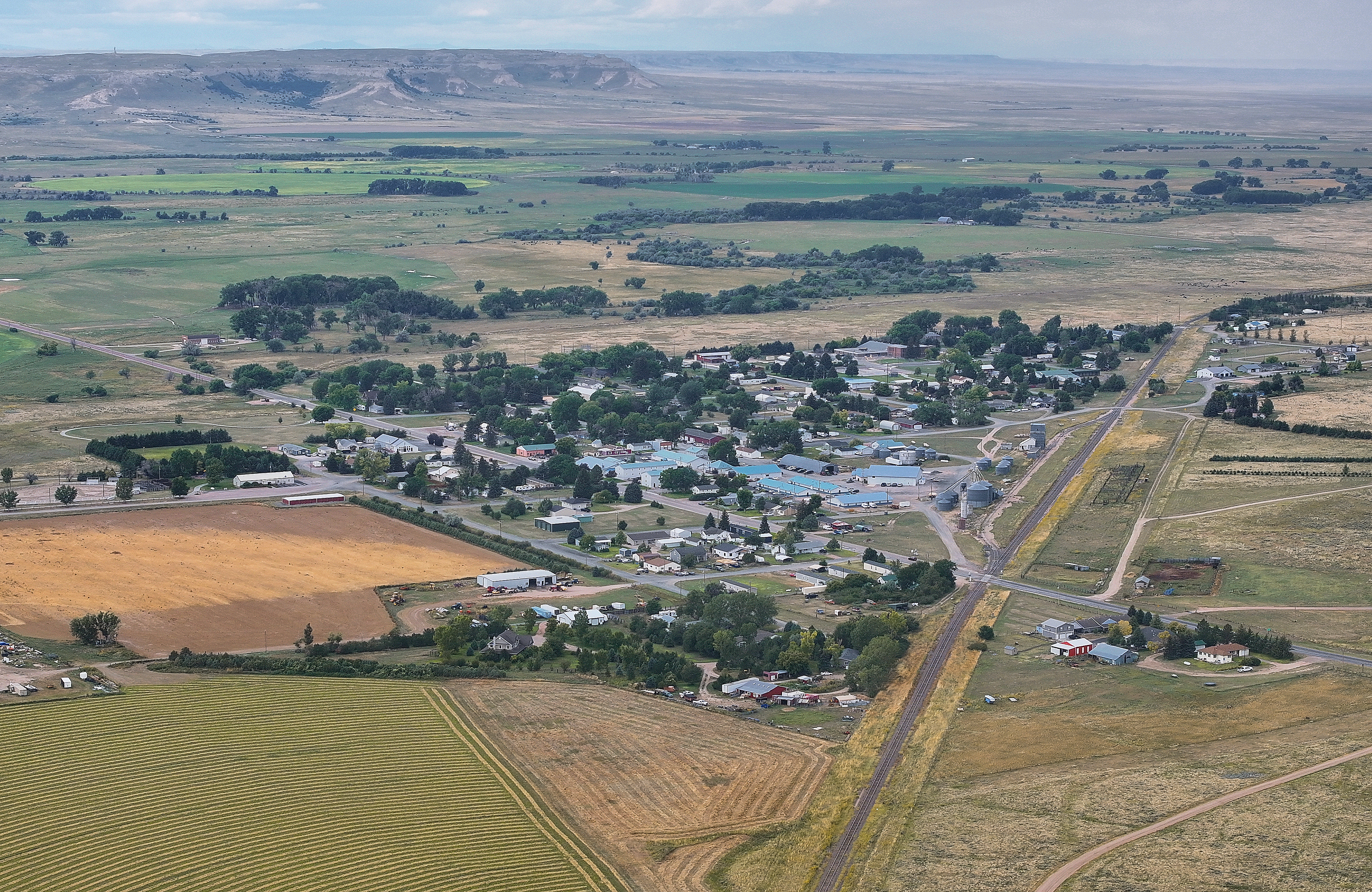
- Aerial view, 2025

- Location of LaGrange in Goshen County, Wyoming
- Coordinates: 41°38′19″N 104°09′47″W
- Country: United States
- State: Wyoming
- County: Goshen

Area
  - Total: 0.39 sq mi (1.00 km^{2})
  - Land: 0.39 sq mi (1.00 km^{2})
  - Water: 0 sq mi (0.00 km^{2})
- Elevation: 4,590 ft (1,400 m)

Population (2020)
  - Total: 372
  - Density: 961/sq mi (371.1/km^{2})
- Time zone: UTC-7 (Mountain (MST))
  - Summer (DST): UTC-6 (MDT)
- ZIP code: 82221
- Area code: 307
- FIPS code: 56-43745
- GNIS feature ID: 2412854
- Website: www.lagrangewyo.gov

LaGrange is a town in Goshen County, Wyoming, United States. The population was 372 at the time of the 2020 census.

== Demographics ==
Historical population
Census	Pop.	Note	%±
1940	211		—
1950	221		4.7%
1960	176		−20.4%
1970	189		7.4%
1980	232		22.8%
1990	224		−3.4%
2000	332		48.2%
2010	448		34.9%
2020	372		−17.0%
U.S. Decennial Census

=== 2010 census ===
As of the 2010 census, there were 448 people, 115 households, and 84 families residing in LaGrange. The population density in the town was 1,092.7 inhabitants per square mile (421.9/km^{2}). There were 135 housing units of an average density of 329.3 per square mile (127.1/km^{2}). The racial makeup of LaGrange was 94.4% White, 0.9% African American, 0.9% Native American, 0.2% Asian, 2.9% from other races, and 0.7% from two or more races. Hispanics or Latinos of any race made up 7.1% of the population.

LaGrange had 115 households, of which 27.0% had children under the age of 18 living with them; 69.6% were married couples living together, 2.6% had a female householder with no husband present, 0.9% had a male householder with no wife present, and 27.0% were non-families. 26.1% of all households were made up of individuals, and 8.7% were someone living alone who was 65 years of age or older. The average household size was 2.55 and the average family size was 3.11.

The town's median age was 22.1 years. 17.2% of residents were under the age of 18; 41.5% were between the ages of 18 and 24; 13.6% were from 25 to 44; 17.1% were from 45 to 64; and 10.5% were 65 years of age or older. The gender makeup of the town was 52.5% male and 47.5% female.

=== 2000 census ===
As of the 2000 census, there were 332 people, 86 households, and 57 families residing in LaGrange. The population density was 884.3 people per square mile (341.4 people/km^{2}). There were 108 housing units with an average density of 287.7 per square mile (111.1/km^{2}). The racial makeup of the town was 93.98% White, 0.30% African American, 1.81% Native American, 1.20% Asian, 0.30% Pacific Islander, 0.60% from other races, and 1.81% from two or more races. Hispanics or Latinos of any race made up 7.53% of the population.

There were 86 households, of which 31.4% had children under the age of 18 living with them; 58.1% were married couples living together, 9.3% had a female householder with no husband present, and 32.6% were non-families. 29.1% of all households were made up of individuals, and 10.5% were someone living alone who was 65 years of age or older. The average household size was 2.66 and the average family size was 3.40.

In the town, 21.7% of the population was under the age of 18, 39.8% from 18 to 24 years of age, 16.9% from 25 to 44, 10.5% from 45 to 64, and 11.1% 65 or older. The median age was 22 years. For every 100 females, there were 96.4 males. For every 100 females age 18 and over, there were 100.0 males.

The median income for a household in the town was $18,750, and the median family income was $27,917. Males had a median income of $16,875 and females $11,250. The town per capita income was $8,056. About 28.3% of families and 24.6% of the population were below the poverty line, including 21.3% of those under age 18 and 14.3% of those 65 or over.

== Geography ==
According to the United States Census Bureau, the town has a total area of 0.39 square miles (1.01 km^{2}), all land.

=== Climate ===
Climate data for LaGrange, Wyoming (1991–2020)
Month	Jan	Feb	Mar	Apr	May	Jun	Jul	Aug	Sep	Oct	Nov	Dec	Year
Mean daily maximum °F (°C)	43.1 (6.2)	44.6 (7.0)	55.2 (12.9)	62.6 (17.0)	71.8 (22.1)	83.1 (28.4)	90.0 (32.2)	88.2 (31.2)	79.2 (26.2)	65.2 (18.4)	52.3 (11.3)	42.2 (5.7)	64.8 (18.2)
Daily mean °F (°C)	30.9 (−0.6)	31.8 (−0.1)	40.6 (4.8)	47.6 (8.7)	56.6 (13.7)	66.7 (19.3)	73.3 (22.9)	71.6 (22.0)	62.7 (17.1)	49.3 (9.6)	38.7 (3.7)	30.3 (−0.9)	50.0 (10.0)
Mean daily minimum °F (°C)	18.8 (−7.3)	18.9 (−7.3)	26.0 (−3.3)	32.7 (0.4)	41.3 (5.2)	50.3 (10.2)	56.6 (13.7)	55.1 (12.8)	46.1 (7.8)	33.5 (0.8)	25.2 (−3.8)	18.3 (−7.6)	35.2 (1.8)
Average precipitation inches (mm)	0.37 (9.4)	0.67 (17)	1.05 (27)	1.88 (48)	2.24 (57)	2.14 (54)	1.57 (40)	1.89 (48)	1.46 (37)	1.36 (35)	0.57 (14)	0.77 (20)	15.97 (406.4)
Average snowfall inches (cm)	6.2 (16)	6.6 (17)	10.4 (26)	7.6 (19)	0.3 (0.76)	0.0 (0.0)	0.0 (0.0)	0.0 (0.0)	0.3 (0.76)	5.0 (13)	6.4 (16)	10.6 (27)	53.4 (135.52)
Source: NOAA

== About LaGrange ==
LaGrange, Wyoming originated along the Texas cattle trail, offering settlers a place to gather. The town is named after Mr. Kale LaGrange, who settled in the area.

LaGrange serves as a meeting place for people living along both Horse Creek and Bear Creek. The annual LaGrange Mini-Fair, a big draw for the community, consists of family-oriented events such as a free will donation breakfast, parades, a rodeo for children, and an evening show with country & western entertainment.

The town has two churches, LaGrange Holiness Chapel and the non-denominational LaGrange Bible Church, and is home to the Frontier School of the Bible, a three-year college serving approximately 225 students annually.

LaGrange has a volunteer fire department and rescue unit. There are also American Legion and American Legion Auxiliary units active in civic duties, as well as a Home-makers Extension Club and 4H clubs.

== Education ==
Public education in the town of LaGrange is provided by Goshen County School District Number 1.

== Highways ==
- U.S. Highway 85
- WYO 151

== See also ==
- List of municipalities in Wyoming
