= Bob Nicholas =

American politician

Robert A. "Bob" Nicholas

Member of the Wyoming House of Representatives
- Incumbent
- Assumed office January 3, 2011
- Preceded by: Lori Millin
- Constituency: 8th district (2011–2023); 7th district (2023–present)

Personal details
- Born: October 14, 1957 (age 68) Lander, Wyoming, U.S.
- Party: Republican
- Spouse: Widower
- Children: 3
- Education: University of Wyoming; University of Wyoming College of Law
- Occupation: Lawyer; Businessman
- Website: State Legislature Page

Robert A. Nicholas (born October 14, 1957) is an American Republican politician. He is currently a member of the Wyoming House of Representatives from the 7th district. A lawyer by profession, Nicholas was first elected from the 8th district in November 2010, taking office early the next year.

== Early life and career ==
Born in Lander, Wyoming, Nicholas graduated from the University of Wyoming with a bachelor's degree in political science in 1982, followed three years later with a degree from the University of Wyoming College of Law.

== Political career ==
Nicholas first ran for the 8th district in 2008 and lost to the incumbent Lori Millin, 2,438 votes to 2,271, but he succeeded two years later. He was unopposed in the 2010 primary and beat Democrat Ken McCauley 1,950 votes to 1,635. He is a member of the House Judiciary Committee. During his campaign, he emphasized economic growth, smaller government and environmental protections as his priorities, and he also wanted to push for a pilot charter school in Laramie County.

On November 23, 2011, Nicholas was arrested in Boca Grande, Florida on the felony charge that he had assaulted his 19-year-old, mentally disabled son outside a restaurant. The charges were subsequently dropped upon review by the Florida State Attorney's office because of "insufficient evidence".

Nicholas considers himself a fiscal conservative who supports cuts in the state bureaucracy and increases in the rainy day fund to an amount equal to two years of current state spending. "There is no government agency that will not spend all that you give it, and it's hard as a legislator, if you see a pot of money there, not to spend it. So I'm a strong advocate of saving any monies that we possibly can," Nicholas told the Wyoming Tribune Eagle. Nevertheless, he indicated that he could support a small increase in the gasoline tax to fund highway projects.

In 2012, Nicholas worked on a juvenile justice bill that would increase the confidentiality for young persons charged in criminal cases. He was reported as supporting changes in the educational system with less reliance on standardized testing: "We just have to do more than test-based criteria. It has to be more comprehensive than that."

Nicholas was opposed in the August 2012 Republican primary by Keith Eldred and Margaret Wall. In the general election Nicholas faced Kathleen Peterson.

== Personal life ==
A widower, Nicholas has three children. He is a Catholic and lives in Cheyenne. State senator Phil Nicholas is his brother.
