= Burns, Wyoming =

Town in Laramie County, Wyoming, United States

- Town
- Location of Burns in Laramie County, Wyoming
- Coordinates: 41°11′27″N 104°22′12″W
- Country: United States
- State: Wyoming
- County: Laramie
- Established: 1916

Government
  - Type: Mayor and Council

Area
  - Total: 3.05 sq mi (7.91 km^{2})
  - Land: 3.05 sq mi (7.91 km^{2})
  - Water: 0 sq mi (0.00 km^{2})
- Elevation: 5,518 ft (1,682 m)

Population (2020)
  - Total: 356
  - Density: 116.6/sq mi (45.01/km^{2})
- Time zone: UTC-7 (Mountain (MST))
  - Summer (DST): UTC-6 (MDT)
- ZIP code: 82053
- Area code: 307
- FIPS code: 56-11265
- GNIS feature ID: 2411746
- Website: www.burnswy.com

Burns is a town in Laramie County, Wyoming, United States. It is part of the Cheyenne, Wyoming Metropolitan Statistical Area. As of the 2020 census, Burns had a population of 356.

== History ==
Originally, Burns was a siding with a water tank on the Union Pacific Railroad. The community of Burns was conceived and marketed as a German-Lutheran settlement named New Berlin and initially platted as the Town of Luther in 1907. The original name was given by settlers of German Ancestry in honor of Martin Luther. Burns was the center of the Golden Prairie District promoted by the James R. Carpenter's Federal Land & Securities Co. formed in 1905.

The town was incorporated in 1916.

As of 2023 Main Street is the only paved road and the community has four blocks.

== Geography ==
Burns is located approximately 25 miles (40 km) east of Cheyenne.

According to the United States Census Bureau, the town has a total area of 3.05 square miles (7.90 km^{2}), all land.

== Demographics ==
Historical population
Census	Pop.	Note	%±
1920	300		—
1930	216		−28.0%
1940	253		17.1%
1950	216		−14.6%
1960	225		4.2%
1970	185		−17.8%
1980	268		44.9%
1990	254		−5.2%
2000	285		12.2%
2010	301		5.6%
2020	356		18.3%
2024 (est.)	379	▲	6.5%
U.S. Decennial Census

=== 2020 census ===
As of the census of 2020, there were 356 people, 118 households, and 83 families residing in the town. The population density was 98.7 inhabitants per square mile (38.1/km^{2}). There were 138 housing units at an average density of 45.2 per square mile (17.5/km^{2}). The racial makeup of the town was 87.1% White, 0.1% African American, 1.1% Native American, 2.2% from other races, and 8.1% from two or more races. Hispanic or Latino of any race were 6.7% of the population.

=== 2010 census ===
As of the census of 2010, there were 301 people, 118 households, and 83 families residing in the town. The population density was 98.7 inhabitants per square mile (38.1/km^{2}). There were 138 housing units at an average density of 45.2 per square mile (17.5/km^{2}). The racial makeup of the town was 94.7% White, 1.0% African American, 1.3% Native American, 1.0% from other races, and 2.0% from two or more races. Hispanic or Latino of any race were 3.7% of the population.

There were 118 households, of which 30.5% had children under the age of 18 living with them, 58.5% were married couples living together, 6.8% had a female householder with no husband present, 5.1% had a male householder with no wife present, and 29.7% were non-families. 23.7% of all households were made up of individuals, and 12.7% had someone living alone who was 65 years of age or older. The average household size was 2.55 and the average family size was 3.04.

The median age in the town was 41.6 years. 26.9% of residents were under the age of 18; 6.9% were between the ages of 18 and 24; 19.9% were from 25 to 44; 27.5% were from 45 to 64; and 18.6% were 65 years of age or older. The gender makeup of the town was 47.5% male and 52.5% female.

=== 2000 census ===
As of the census of 2000, there were 285 people, 112 households, and 76 families residing in the town. The population density was 93.2 people per square mile (36.0/km^{2}). There were 117 housing units at an average density of 38.3 per square mile (14.8/km^{2}). The racial makeup of the town was 96.14% White, 0.70% Native American, 1.75% from other races, and 1.40% from two or more races. Hispanic or Latino of any race were 2.11% of the population.

There were 112 households, out of which 35.7% had children under the age of 18 living with them, 58.0% were married couples living together, 6.3% had a female householder with no husband present, and 32.1% were non-families. 25.0% of all households were made up of individuals, and 12.5% had someone living alone who was 65 years of age or older. The average household size was 2.54 and the average family size was 3.13.

In the town, the population was spread out, with 30.5% under the age of 18, 4.9% from 18 to 24, 25.6% from 25 to 44, 24.6% from 45 to 64, and 14.4% who were 65 years of age or older. The median age was 37 years. For every 100 females, there were 88.7 males. For every 100 females age 18 and over, there were 90.4 males.

The median income for a household in the town was $31,875, and the median income for a family was $33,333. Males had a median income of $23,929 versus $19,286 for females. The per capita income for the town was $15,460. About 7.3% of families and 14.7% of the population were below the poverty line, including 26.0% of those under the age of eighteen and 12.8% of those 65 or over.

== Government ==
Burns has a mayor and town council. In 2024 Joe Nicholson was selected as mayor pro tem to replace James Clark. Clark left his position due to health concerns. Clark's term ended May 2025. Nicholson ran for and was elected mayor in 2025. Nicholson faced controversy in 2023 due to the town council, of which he was a member, voting to close a restaurant. Nicholson owns the only other restaurant in town leading to accusations of conflict of interest.

== Education ==
Public education in the town of Burns is provided by Laramie County School District #2. Schools serving the town include Burns Elementary School (grades K-6) and Burns Junior/Senior High School (grades 7-12).

Burns has a public library, a branch of the Laramie County Library System.

== See also ==
- List of municipalities in Wyoming
