= Meriden, Wyoming =

- Unincorporated crossroads
- Location within the state of Wyoming Meriden (the United States)
- Coordinates: 41°32′37″N 104°19′09″W
- Country: United States
- State: Wyoming
- County: Laramie
- Elevation: 4,957 ft (1,511 m)
- Time zone: UTC-7 (Mountain (MST))
  - Summer (DST): UTC-6 (MDT)
- ZIP codes: 82081
- GNIS feature ID: 1591473

Meriden is an unincorporated crossroads in Laramie County, Wyoming, United States. It is part of the Cheyenne, Wyoming Metropolitan Statistical Area, and is located about 45 miles (72 km) northeast of Cheyenne, and 40 miles (64 km) south of Torrington. It has a post office, zip code 82081.

The community was named after Meriden, Connecticut.

Public education in the community of Meriden is provided by Laramie County School District #2.

== Geography ==
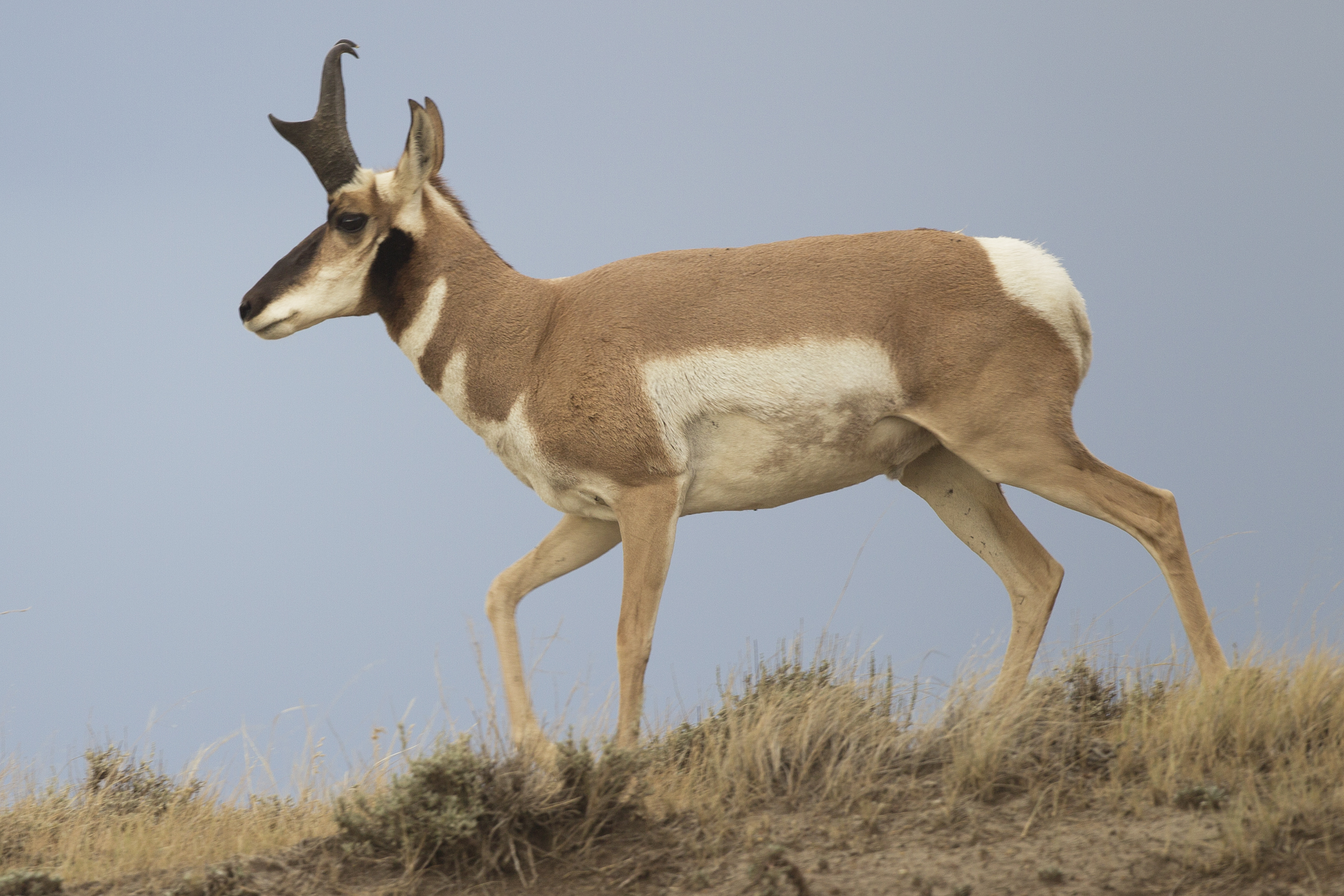
Pronghorn Antelope are common in the area around Meriden.

Meriden is located at an elevation of 4,957 feet (1,511 m), at the junction of U.S. Highway 85 (Torrington Rd) and Laramie County Road 238 just south of the Goshen County line, and about 10 miles (16 km) from the Nebraska state line. Horse Creek runs through Meriden.

== Highways ==
- U.S. Highway 85 - north to Torrington, south to Cheyenne.
