= Pine Bluffs, Wyoming =

- Town
- On the Wyoming-Nebraska border
- Nickname: Title Town
- Location of Pine Bluffs in Laramie County, Wyoming.
- Coordinates: 41°10′46″N 104°4′7″W
- Country: United States
- State: Wyoming
- County: Laramie

Area
  - Total: 3.22 sq mi (8.35 km^{2})
  - Land: 3.22 sq mi (8.35 km^{2})
  - Water: 0 sq mi (0.00 km^{2})
- Elevation: 5,049 ft (1,539 m)

Population (2020)
  - Total: 1,172
  - Density: 359.5/sq mi (138.79/km^{2})
- Time zone: UTC-7 (Mountain (MST))
  - Summer (DST): UTC-6 (MDT)
- ZIP code: 82082
- Area code: 307
- GNIS feature ID: 2413131
- FIPS code: 56-61435
- Website: pinebluffswy.gov

Pine Bluffs is a town in eastern Laramie County, Wyoming, United States. It is located on the county's border with Nebraska. Pine Bluffs is part of the Cheyenne, Wyoming, Metropolitan Statistical Area. As of the 2020 census, Pine Bluffs had a population of 1,172. It was first known as Rock Ranch, but the name was changed by railroad officials for the pines on the nearby bluffs.

== History ==
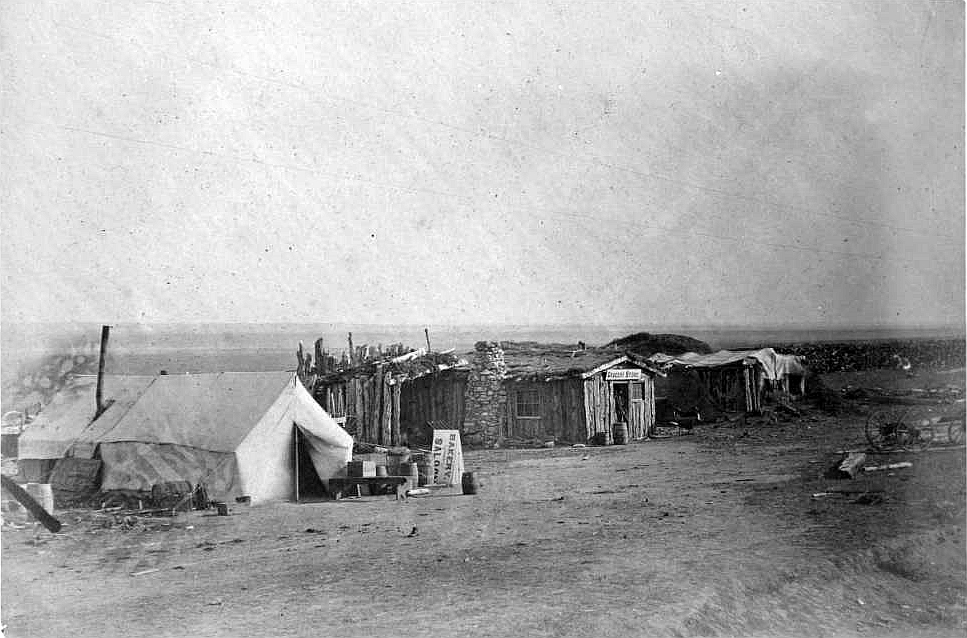
Pine Bluffs, 1868

The Union Pacific Railroad arrived at Pine Bluffs in 1868 as part of the First transcontinental railroad. Pine Bluffs was a cattle shipping station, also known as "Rock Ranch," as start point of the trip into the Wyoming Frontier, the town also was called the "Frontier Crossroads".

The first gas station in Pine Bluffs was built by politician William Henry Harrison and A. E. Carlstrum. On October 17, 1956, the Wyoming Public Service Commission authorized William Henry Harrison III to build and operate a community television system in the town.

In July 2016, Pine Bluffs was battered by a severe hailstorm, causing widespread damage. The Wyoming National Guard was called in to deal with the damage.

== Geography ==
According to the United States Census Bureau, the town has a total area of 3.22 square miles (8.34 km^{2}), all land. The eastern city limits border the state line with Nebraska.

Pine Bluffs experiences a semi-arid climate (Köppen climate classification BSk).

Climate data for Pine Bluffs
Month	Jan	Feb	Mar	Apr	May	Jun	Jul	Aug	Sep	Oct	Nov	Dec	Year
Record high °F (°C)	70 (21)	75 (24)	85 (29)	91 (33)	97 (36)	105 (41)	109 (43)	104 (40)	101 (38)	91 (33)	82 (28)	74 (23)	109 (43)
Mean daily maximum °F (°C)	39 (4)	43 (6)	49 (9)	58 (14)	68 (20)	80 (27)	87 (31)	85 (29)	75 (24)	63 (17)	48 (9)	40 (4)	61 (16)
Mean daily minimum °F (°C)	12 (−11)	16 (−9)	23 (−5)	30 (−1)	40 (4)	49 (9)	54 (12)	53 (12)	43 (6)	32 (0)	20 (−7)	13 (−11)	32 (0)
Record low °F (°C)	−34 (−37)	−31 (−35)	−21 (−29)	−3 (−19)	18 (−8)	26 (−3)	32 (0)	34 (1)	6 (−14)	−4 (−20)	−17 (−27)	−38 (−39)	−38 (−39)
Average precipitation inches (mm)	0.44 (11)	0.28 (7.1)	1.12 (28)	1.59 (40)	2.44 (62)	2.26 (57)	2.51 (64)	2.05 (52)	1.28 (33)	0.67 (17)	0.55 (14)	0.40 (10)	15.59 (396)
Source: Weather.com

== Demographics ==
Historical population
Census	Pop.	Note	%±
1910	246		—
1920	618		151.2%
1930	670		8.4%
1940	771		15.1%
1950	846		9.7%
1960	1,121		32.5%
1970	937		−16.4%
1980	1,077		14.9%
1990	1,054		−2.1%
2000	1,153		9.4%
2010	1,129		−2.1%
2020	1,172		3.8%
U.S. Decennial Census

=== 2010 census ===
As of the census of 2010, there were 1,129 people, 476 households, and 314 families residing in the town. The population density was 350.6 inhabitants per square mile (135.4/km^{2}). There were 532 housing units at an average density of 165.2 per square mile (63.8/km^{2}). The racial makeup of the town was 94.2% White, 0.2% African American, 0.9% Native American, 0.4% Asian, 2.3% from other races, and 2.0% from two or more races. Hispanic or Latino of any race were 11.1% of the population.

There were 476 households, of which 31.5% had children under the age of 18 living with them, 52.9% were married couples living together, 8.0% had a female householder with no husband present, 5.0% had a male householder with no wife present, and 34.0% were non-families. 30.0% of all households were made up of individuals, and 11.6% had someone living alone who was 65 years of age or older. The average household size was 2.35 and the average family size was 2.92.

The median age in the town was 42.6 years. 25.2% of residents were under the age of 18; 6.2% were between the ages of 18 and 24; 21.7% were from 25 to 44; 28.7% were from 45 to 64; and 18.2% were 65 years of age or older. The gender makeup of the town was 51.0% male and 49.0% female.

=== 2000 census ===
As of the census of 2000, there were 1,153 people, 482 households, and 332 families residing in the town. The population density was 357.4 people per square mile (137.8/km^{2}). There were 517 housing units at an average density of 160.3 per square mile (61.8/km^{2}). The racial makeup of the town was 95.92% White, 0.17% African American, 0.69% Native American, 0.17% Asian, 1.82% from other races, and 1.21% from two or more races. Hispanic or Latino of any race were 6.85% of the population.

There were 482 households, out of which 30.1% had children under the age of 18 living with them, 55.2% were married couples living together, 9.8% had a female householder with no husband present, and 31.1% were non-families. 28.2% of all households were made up of individuals, and 14.9% had someone living alone who was 65 years of age or older. The average household size was 2.38 and the average family size was 2.90.

In the town, the population was spread out, with 27.3% under the age of 18, 5.6% from 18 to 24, 23.2% from 25 to 44, 25.0% from 45 to 64, and 18.9% who were 65 years of age or older. The median age was 41 years. For every 100 females, there were 95.1 males. For every 100 females age 18 and over, there were 87.9 males.

The median income for a household in the town was $33,152, and the median income for a family was $40,417. Males had a median income of $30,078 versus $20,500 for females. The per capita income for the town was $15,525. About 7.3% of families and 10.1% of the population were below the poverty line, including 15.2% of those under age 18 and 8.3% of those age 65 or over.

== Education ==
Public education in the town of Pine Bluffs is provided by Laramie County School District #2. Schools serving the town include Pine Bluffs Elementary School (grades K–6) and Pine Bluffs Junior/Senior High School (grades 7–12).

Pine Bluffs has a public library, a branch of the Laramie County Library System.

== Notable people ==
- Justin Fornstrom, state representative, mayor
- William Henry Harrison (1894–1991), state representative, mayor
