= Laramie County, Wyoming =

County in Wyoming, United States

- County
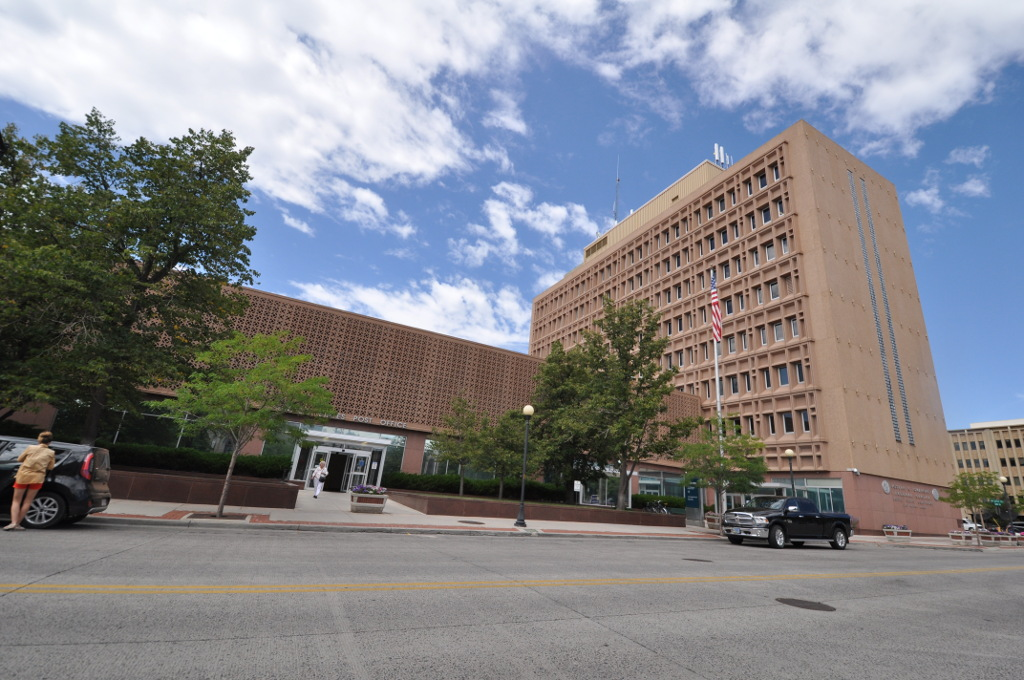
- United States Post Office and Courthouse, Cheyenne, Wyoming

- Location within the U.S. state of Wyoming
- Coordinates: 41°19′N 104°41′W
- Country: United States
- State: Wyoming
- Founded: January 9, 1867
- Named for: Jacques La Ramee
- Seat: Cheyenne
- Largest city: Cheyenne

Area
  - Total: 2,688 sq mi (6,960 km^{2})
  - Land: 2,686 sq mi (6,960 km^{2})
  - Water: 1.6 sq mi (4.1 km^{2}) 0.06%

Population (2020)
  - Total: 100,512
  - Estimate (2025): 102,938 ▲
  - Density: 37.42/sq mi (14.45/km^{2})
- Time zone: UTC−7 (Mountain)
  - Summer (DST): UTC−6 (MDT)
- Congressional district: At-large
- Website: www.laramiecountywy.gov

Laramie County is a county located at the southeast corner of the state of Wyoming. As of the 2020 United States census, the population was 100,512 or 17.4% of the state's total 2020 population, making it the most populous county in Wyoming, but the least populous county in the United States to be the most populous in its state. The county seat is Cheyenne, the state capital. The county lies west of the Nebraska state line and north of the Colorado state line. Laramie County comprises the Cheyenne, WY Metropolitan Statistical Area. The city of Laramie, Wyoming, is in neighboring Albany County.

== History ==
Laramie County was originally created in 1867 as a county within the Dakota Territory. The county was named for Jacques La Ramee, a French-Canadian fur-trader. In 1867, a portion of Laramie County was annexed to create Sweetwater County; in 1868; further annexations occurred to create Albany County and Carbon County. Laramie County became a county in the Wyoming Territory when the territorial government was formed in 1869. Crook County was created with land ceded by Laramie County in 1875. In 1888, Converse County was formed from a portion of Laramie County. In 1911, Goshen and Platte Counties were formed from parts of Laramie County, giving the county its current boundaries.

The county's early economy was based on agriculture and livestock raising. The present-day Wyoming Stock Growers Association dates from that era. Other types of animal husbandry also occurred.

Some of the settlers in early Laramie County were foreign immigrants; for example, Burns was largely settled by German immigrants.

== Arts and culture ==
=== Laramie County Library System ===
The Laramie County Library System is one of the oldest continually operating county library systems in the United States, the first branch established in Cheyenne in 1886. In 1899, Andrew Carnegie donated $50,000 toward the building of the state's first Carnegie Public Library, which opened in 1902. The library moved to a larger location in 1969. In 2007, a second library opened.

== Geography ==
According to the U.S. Census Bureau, the county has a total area of 2,688 square miles (6,960 km^{2}), of which 2,686 square miles (6,960 km^{2}) is land and 1.6 square miles (4.1 km^{2}) (0.06%) is water.

=== Adjacent counties ===
- Goshen County – north
- Banner County, Nebraska – northeast
- Kimball County, Nebraska – east
- Weld County, Colorado – south
- Larimer County, Colorado – southwest
- Albany County – west
- Platte County – northwest

=== Major highways ===
- Interstate 25
- Interstate 80
- Interstate 180 (Not a freeway.)
- I-25 BL
- I-80 BL
- U.S. Route 30
- U.S. Route 85
- U.S. Route 87
- Wyoming Highway 210
- Wyoming Highway 211
- Wyoming Highway 212
- Wyoming Highway 213
- Wyoming Highway 214
- Wyoming Highway 215
- Wyoming Highway 216
- Wyoming Highway 219
- Wyoming Highway 221
- Wyoming Highway 222
- Wyoming Highway 223
- Wyoming Highway 225

=== Transit ===
- Cheyenne Transit
- Express Arrow
- Greyhound Lines

== Demographics ==
Historical population
Census	Pop.	Note	%±
1870	2,957		—
1880	6,409		116.7%
1890	16,777		161.8%
1900	20,181		20.3%
1910	26,127		29.5%
1920	20,699		−20.8%
1930	26,845		29.7%
1940	33,651		25.4%
1950	47,662		41.6%
1960	60,149		26.2%
1970	56,360		−6.3%
1980	68,649		21.8%
1990	73,142		6.5%
2000	81,607		11.6%
2010	91,738		12.4%
2020	100,512		9.6%
2025 (est.)	102,938	▲	2.4%
US Decennial Census; 1870–2000 2010–2020

=== 2020 census ===
As of the 2020 census, the county had a population of 100,512. Of the residents, 23.3% were under the age of 18 and 17.1% were 65 years of age or older; the median age was 38.1 years. For every 100 females there were 101.4 males, and for every 100 females age 18 and over there were 100.2 males.

Laramie County, Wyoming – Racial and ethnic composition Note: the US Census treats Hispanic/Latino as an ethnic category. This table excludes Latinos from the racial categories and assigns them to a separate category. Hispanics/Latinos may be of any race.
Race / Ethnicity (NH = Non-Hispanic)	Pop 2000	Pop 2010	Pop 2020	% 2000	% 2010	% 2020
White alone (NH)	67,901	74,120	75,279	83.20%	80.80%	74.90%
Black or African American alone (NH)	2,015	2,063	2,200	2.47%	2.25%	2.19%
Native American or Alaska Native alone (NH)	553	595	596	0.68%	0.65%	0.59%
Asian alone (NH)	743	935	1,228	0.91%	1.02%	1.22%
Pacific Islander alone (NH)	73	119	136	0.09%	0.13%	0.14%
Other race alone (NH)	106	115	518	0.13%	0.13%	0.52%
Mixed race or Multiracial (NH)	1,319	1,813	4,953	1.62%	1.98%	4.93%
Hispanic or Latino (any race)	8,897	11,978	15,602	10.90%	13.06%	15.52%
Total	81,607	91,738	100,512	100.00%	100.00%	100.00%

The racial makeup of the county was 80.2% White, 2.5% Black or African American, 1.1% American Indian and Alaska Native, 1.3% Asian, 4.5% from some other race, and 10.3% from two or more races. Hispanic or Latino residents of any race comprised 15.5% of the population.

There were 41,433 households in the county, of which 29.0% had children under the age of 18 living with them and 24.0% had a female householder with no spouse or partner present. About 30.6% of all households were made up of individuals and 12.1% had someone living alone who was 65 years of age or older.

There were 44,181 housing units, of which 6.2% were vacant. Among occupied housing units, 67.6% were owner-occupied and 32.4% were renter-occupied. The homeowner vacancy rate was 1.2% and the rental vacancy rate was 6.5%.

=== 2010 census ===
As of the 2010 United States census, there were 91,738 people, 37,576 households, and 24,340 families in the county. The population density was 34.2 people per square mile (13.2 people/km^{2}). There were 40,462 housing units at an average density of 15.1 units per square mile (5.8 units/km^{2}). The racial makeup of the county was 88.5% white, 2.5% black or African American, 1.1% Asian, 1.0% American Indian, 0.2% Pacific islander, 3.8% from other races, and 3.1% from two or more races. Those of Hispanic or Latino origin made up 13.1% of the population. In terms of ancestry, 29.5% were German, 15.5% were Irish, 12.7% were English, and 4.9% were American.

Of the 37,576 households, 31.9% had children under the age of 18 living with them, 49.3% were married couples living together, 10.7% had a female householder with no husband present, 35.2% were non-families, and 29.1% of all households were made up of individuals. The average household size was 2.40 and the average family size was 2.95. The median age was 37.0 years.

The median income for a household in the county was $52,824 and the median income for a family was $64,589. Males had a median income of $44,001 versus $32,882 for females. The per capita income for the county was $27,406. About 6.7% of families and 9.6% of the population were below the poverty line, including 13.8% of those under age 18 and 4.0% of those age 65 or over.

=== 2000 census ===
As of the 2000 United States census, Laramie County had 81,607 people, 31,927 households, and 21,614 families. The population density was 30 people per square mile (12 people/km^{2}). The county had 34,213 housing units at an average density of 13 units per square mile (5.0 units/km^{2}). The racial makeup of the county was 88.92% White, 2.60% Black or African American, 0.85% Native American, 0.95% Asian, 0.11% Pacific Islander, 4.00% from other races, and 2.57% from two or more races. 10.90% of the population were Hispanic or Latino of any race. 23.7% were of German, 11.1% English, 10.3% Irish and 7.4% American ancestry.

As of the 2000 census, Laramie County had 31,927 households, of which 33.20% had children under the age of 18 living with them, 53.90% were married couples living together, 9.90% had a female householder with no husband present, and 32.30% were non-families. 27.20% of all households were made up of a single individual and 8.90% had someone living alone who was 65 years of age or older. The average household size was 2.45 and the average family size was 2.98.

The county population contained 25.80% under the age of 18, 9.60% from 18 to 24, 30.50% from 25 to 44, 22.70% from 45 to 64, and 11.50% who were 65 years of age or older. The median age was 35 years. For every 100 females, the county had 100-100.9 males.

The median income for a household in the county was $39,607, and the median income for a family was $46,536. Males had a median income of $31,644 versus $24,406 for females. The per capita income for the county was $19,634. About 6.50% of families and 9.10% of the population were below the poverty line, including 12.00% of those under age 18 and 6.50% of those age 65 or over.

== Communities ==
=== City ===
- Cheyenne (county seat and largest municipality)

=== Towns ===
- Albin
- Burns
- Pine Bluffs

=== Unincorporated areas ===
==== Census-designated places ====
- Carpenter
- Fox Farm-College
- Hillsdale
- Ranchettes
- South Greeley
- FE Warren AFB

==== Other communities ====
- Altvan
- Egbert
- Granite
- Horse Creek
- Orchard Valley
- Meriden

== Politics and government ==
Like Wyoming as a whole, Laramie County is strongly Republican. It is extremely conservative for an urban county, having not backed the Democratic presidential candidate since Lyndon Johnson in 1964–one of only two times since 1952 that it has supported a Democrat. In 2016, Hillary Clinton managed to win just 28.3 percent of the vote in the county, the lowest total of any presidential candidate in Laramie since John W. Davis in 1924, when a large proportion of progressive voters defected to Robert M. La Follette Sr. Nonetheless, Laramie County is the third-friendliest to Democrats in the state, beaten only by blue Teton County and purple Albany County.

United States presidential election results for Laramie County, Wyoming
Year	Republican		Democratic		Third party(ies)	
Year	No.	%	No.	%	No.	%
1892	1,890	57.48%	0	0.00%	1,398	42.52%
1896	1,776	51.88%	1,628	47.56%	19	0.56%
1900	2,181	58.64%	1,538	41.36%	0	0.00%
1904	3,109	69.77%	1,167	26.19%	180	4.04%
1908	2,965	52.65%	2,523	44.80%	144	2.56%
1912	1,871	38.95%	1,923	40.03%	1,010	21.02%
1916	2,428	45.64%	2,759	51.86%	133	2.50%
1920	3,399	62.60%	1,810	33.33%	221	4.07%
1924	3,944	53.00%	1,120	15.05%	2,378	31.95%
1928	5,862	65.33%	3,029	33.76%	82	0.91%
1932	5,116	46.77%	5,435	49.69%	387	3.54%
1936	4,356	35.88%	7,594	62.55%	190	1.57%
1940	5,955	43.09%	7,808	56.50%	57	0.41%
1944	7,326	49.27%	7,542	50.73%	0	0.00%
1948	6,200	42.69%	8,226	56.64%	98	0.67%
1952	10,785	56.61%	8,187	42.97%	79	0.41%
1956	10,581	53.84%	9,072	46.16%	0	0.00%
1960	11,637	49.05%	12,086	50.95%	0	0.00%
1964	8,563	34.78%	16,059	65.22%	0	0.00%
1968	9,824	46.80%	9,519	45.35%	1,649	7.86%
1972	15,010	65.67%	7,791	34.09%	54	0.24%
1976	14,061	53.48%	12,040	45.79%	193	0.73%
1980	15,361	55.43%	9,512	34.32%	2,840	10.25%
1984	19,348	64.93%	10,110	33.93%	341	1.14%
1988	15,561	56.04%	11,851	42.68%	358	1.29%
1992	12,890	40.46%	12,177	38.23%	6,788	21.31%
1996	16,924	49.97%	13,676	40.38%	3,269	9.65%
2000	21,797	61.71%	12,162	34.43%	1,364	3.86%
2004	25,951	65.07%	13,171	33.03%	757	1.90%
2008	24,549	58.98%	16,072	38.61%	1,004	2.41%
2012	23,904	60.51%	14,295	36.19%	1,306	3.31%
2016	24,847	60.65%	11,573	28.25%	4,549	11.10%
2020	27,891	62.00%	15,217	33.83%	1,874	4.17%
2024	28,063	64.72%	14,153	32.64%	1,146	2.64%

== Education ==
There are two school districts in Laramie County: Laramie County School District Number 1 and Laramie County School District Number 2.

== See also ==
- Wyoming
  - List of cities and towns in Wyoming
  - List of counties in Wyoming
  - Wyoming statistical areas
- Cheyenne County, Jefferson Territory
- Front Range Urban Corridor
- National Register of Historic Places listings in Laramie County, Wyoming
- Southern Rocky Mountain Front
