= 2024 Wyoming Senate election =

2024 Wyoming State Senate election
- November 5, 2024

15 of the 31 seats in the Wyoming Senate 16 seats needed for a majority

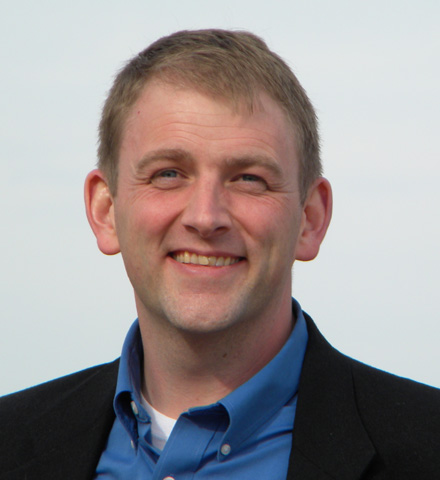
| | Majority party | Minority party |
|---|---|---|
| Leader | Ogden Driskill | Chris Rothfuss |
| Party | Republican | Democratic |
| Leader's seat | 1st district | 9th district |
| Last election | 29 seats, 75.31% | 2 seats, 17.28% |
| Seats before | 29 | 2 |
| Seats won | 29 | 2 |
| Seat change | Steady | Steady |
| Popular vote | 105,174 | 7,742 |
| Percentage | 89.78% | 6.61% |
| Swing | ▲14.47% | ▼10.67% |
- Results by district
President of the Senate before election
Ogden Driskill
Republican
Elected President of the Senate
Bo Biteman
Republican

The 2024 Wyoming Senate election was held on November 5, 2024, to elect members of the Wyoming Legislature for its 68th session. Partisan primaries were held on August 20. Part of the 2024 United States elections, the election was held alongside races for state house, U.S. House, U.S. Senate, and the presidential election.

== Summary ==
Summary of the 2024 Wyoming Senate election results
| Party | Candidates | Votes | % | Seats | | | | |
| Party | Candidates | Votes | % | Before 67th Leg. | Up | Won | After 68th Leg. | +/– |
|---|---|---|---|---|---|---|---|---|
| Republican | 15 | 105,174 | 89.78 | 29 | 15 | 15 | 29 | Steady |
| Democratic | 3 | 7,742 | 6.61 | 2 | 0 | 0 | 2 | Steady |
| Write-in | | 4,227 | 3.61 | — | | | | |
| Valid ballots | | 117,143 | 87.24 | — | | | | |
| Blank or invalid ballots | | 17,139 | 12.76 | — | | | | |
| Total | | 134,282 | 100% | 31 | 15 | | 31 | Steady |

Popular vote
| Republican | 89.78% |
| Democratic | 6.61% |
| Write-ins | 3.61% |

Seats won
| Republican | 100.00% |

Total senate seats
| Republican | 93.55% |
| Democratic | 6.45% |

== Retiring incumbents ==
Five incumbents will not seek re-election.

=== Republicans ===
- District 6: Anthony Bouchard retired.
- District 8: Affie Ellis retired.
- District 10: Dan Furphy retired.
- District 14: Fred Baldwin retired.
- District 22: Dave Kinskey retired.

== Predictions ==
| Source | Ranking | As of |
|---|---|---|
| Sabato's Crystal Ball | Safe R | October 23, 2024 |

== Detailed results ==
=== General election ===
| District | Republicans | | | Democrats | | | Write-ins | | Total |
| District | Candidate | Vote | % | Candidate | Vote | % | Vote | % | Total | Maj. | % |
|---|---|---|---|---|---|---|---|---|---|---|---|
| SD 2 | Brian Boner | 7,712 | 98.24 | — | — | — | 138 | 1.76 | 7,850 | +7,574 | +96.48 |
| SD 4 | Tara Nethercott | 8,255 | 96.41 | — | — | — | 307 | 3.59 | 8,562 | +7,948 | +92.83 |
| SD 6 | Darin Smith | 8,484 | 95.48 | — | — | — | 402 | 4.52 | 8,886 | +8,082 | +90.95 |
| SD 8 | Jared Olsen | 3,444 | 57.91 | Marguerite Herman | 2,464 | 41.43 | 39 | 0.66 | 5,947 | +980 | +16.48 |
| SD 10 | Gary Crum | 6,331 | 64.83 | Mike Selmer | 3,405 | 34.87 | 30 | 0.31 | 9,766 | +2,926 | +29.96 |
| SD 12 | John Kolb | 4,359 | 69.47 | Kenilynn S. Zanetti | 1873 | 29.85 | 43 | 0.69 | 6,275 | +4,316 | +68.78 |
| SD 14 | Laura Taliaferro Pearson | 8,025 | 94.20 | — | — | — | 494 | 5.80 | 8,519 | +7,531 | +88.40 |
| SD 16 | Dan Dockstader | 8,830 | 96.99 | — | — | — | 274 | 3.01 | 9,104 | +8,556 | +93.98 |
| SD 18 | Tim French | 8,568 | 94.43 | — | — | — | 505 | 5.57 | 9,073 | +8,063 | +88.87 |
| SD 20 | Ed Cooper | 8,236 | 97.17 | — | — | — | 240 | 2.83 | 8,476 | +7,996 | +94.34 |
| SD 22 | Barry Crago | 8,599 | 93.95 | — | — | — | 554 | 6.05 | 9,153 | +8,045 | +87.89 |
| SD 24 | Troy McKeown | 5,305 | 92.15 | — | — | — | 452 | 7.85 | 5,757 | +4,853 | +84.30 |
| SD 26 | Tim Salazar | 7,266 | 97.01 | — | — | — | 224 | 2.99 | 7,490 | +7,042 | +94.02 |
| SD 28 | Jim Anderson | 5,354 | 94.49 | — | — | — | 312 | 5.51 | 5,666 | +5,042 | +88.99 |
| SD 30 | Charles Scott | 6404 | 96.78 | — | — | — | 213 | 3.22 | 6,617 | +6,191 | +93.56 |

==== Contested races ====
Only three races saw competition between Republicans and Democrats. All three were won by Republicans.

1. SD 8, 16.48% (980 votes) – Jared Olsen (Rep.)
2. SD 10, 29.96% (2,926 votes) – Gary Crum (Rep.)
3. SD 12, 40.38% (4,316 votes) – John Kolb (Rep.)

=== Republican primaries ===
For the sake of brevity, races in which no candidate filed will not be shown.

| District | Winners | | | Runners-up | | | | | | Write-ins | | Total |
| District | Candidate | Vote | % | Candidate | Vote | % | Candidate | Vote | % | Vote | % | Total | Maj. | % |
|---|---|---|---|---|---|---|---|---|---|---|---|---|---|---|
| SD 2 | Brian Boner | 3,662 | 98.52 | — | — | — | — | — | — | 55 | 1.48 | 3,717 | 3,607 | 97.04 |
| SD 4 | Tara Nethercott | 2,942 | 72.68 | Gregg Smith (withdrawn) | 1,059 | 26.16 | — | — | — | 47 | 1.16 | 4,048 | 1,883 | 46.52 |
| SD 6 | Darin Smith | 1780 | 37.60 | Eric D. Johnston | 1267 | 26.76 | Four others | 1,674 | 35.36 | 13 | 0.27 | 4734 | 513 | 10.84 |
| SD 8 | Jared Olsen | 1,222 | 92.44 | — | — | — | — | — | — | 100 | 7.56 | 1,322 | 1,122 | 84.87 |
| SD 10 | Gary E. Crum | 1,712 | 59.99 | Keith Kennedy | 1,129 | 39.56 | — | — | — | 13 | 0.46 | 2,854 | 583 | 20.43 |
| SD 12 | John K. Kolb | 1,313 | 61.33 | Jeff Ramaj | 814 | 38.02 | — | — | — | 14 | 0.65 | 2,141 | 499 | 23.31 |
| SD 14 | Laura Taliaferro Pearson | 2,212 | 46.70 | Albert Sommers | 2,025 | 42.75 | Bill Winney | 490 | 10.34 | 10 | 0.21 | 4,737 | 187 | 3.95 |
| SD 16 | Dan Stockader | 3,168 | 97.42 | — | — | — | — | — | — | 84 | 2.58 | 3,252 | 3,084 | 94.83 |
| SD 18 | Tim A. French | 3,192 | 57.81 | Landon Greer | 2,311 | 41.85 | — | — | — | 10 | 0.34 | 5,522 | 881 | 15.95 |
| SD 20 | Ed Cooper | 2,652 | 51.96 | Tom Olmstead | 2,428 | 47.57 | — | — | — | 24 | 0.47 | 5,104 | 224 | 4.39 |
| SD 22 | Barry Crago | 3,107 | 55.25 | Mark Jennings | 2,500 | 44.45 | — | — | — | 17 | 0.30 | 5,624 | 607 | 10.79 |
| SD 24 | Troy D. McKeown | 1,602 | 57.11 | Phil Christopherson | 1,192 | 42.50 | — | — | — | 11 | 0.39 | 2,805 | 410 | 14.62 |
| SD 26 | Tim Salazar | 2,626 | 60.24 | Elizabeth Philp | 1,726 | 39.60 | — | — | — | 7 | 0.16 | 4,359 | 900 | 20.65 |
| SD 28 | Jim Anderson | 1,304 | 50.23 | Bryce Reece | 1,274 | 49.08 | — | — | — | 18 | 0.69 | 2,596 | 30 | 1.16 |
| SD 30 | Charles K. Scott | 1,438 | 47.65 | Robert L. Hendry | 1,179 | 39.07 | Charles H. Schoenwolf | 394 | 13.06 | 7 | 0.23 | 3,018 | 259 | 8.58 |

=== Democratic primaries ===
For the sake of brevity, races in which no candidate filed will not be shown.

| District | Winners | | | Write-ins | | Total |
| District | Candidate | Vote | % | Vote | % | Total | Maj. | % |
|---|---|---|---|---|---|---|---|---|
| SD 8 | Marguerite Herman | 460 | 97.87 | 10 | 2.13 | 470 | 450 | 95.74 |
| SD 10 | Mike Selmer | 670 | 99.26 | 5 | 0.74 | 675 | 665 | 98.52 |
| SD 12 | Kaylen S. Zanetti | 356 | 99.72 | 1 | 0.28 | 357 | 355 | 99.44 |

== District 2 ==
=== Republican primary ===
==== Nominee ====
- Brian Boner, incumbent senator since 2015

==== Results ====
2024 Wyoming Senate District 2 Republican primary
| Party | Candidate | Votes | % |
|---|---|---|---|
| Republican | Brian Boner (inc.) | 3,662 | 98.52% |
| Write-in | | 55 | 1.48% |
| Valid ballots | | 3,717 | 87.32% |
| Invalid or blank votes | | 540 | 12.68% |
| Total votes | | 4,257 | 100.00% |

=== Democratic primary ===
No candidate qualified for the Democratic primary. 7 write-in votes and 153 blank ballots were cast.

=== General election ===
2024 Wyoming Senate District 2 general election
| Party | Candidate | Votes | % |
|---|---|---|---|
| Republican | Brian Boner (inc.) | 7,712 | 98.24% |
| Write-in | | 138 | 1.76% |
| Valid ballots | | 7,850 | 87.17% |
| Invalid or blank votes | | 1,155 | 12.83% |
| Total votes | | 9,005 | 100.00% |

== District 4 ==
=== Republican primary ===
==== Nominee ====
- Tara Nethercott, incumbent senator since 2017

==== Withdrawn ====
- Gregg Smith, army veteran

==== Results ====
2024 Wyoming Senate District 4 Republican primary
| Party | Candidate | Votes | % |
|---|---|---|---|
| Republican | Tara Nethercott (inc.) | 2,942 | 72.68% |
| Republican | Gregg Smith (withdrawn) | 1,059 | 26.16% |
| Write-in | | 47 | 1.16% |
| Valid ballots | | 4,048 | 95.25% |
| Invalid or blank votes | | 202 | 4.75% |
| Total votes | | 4,250 | 100.00% |

=== Democratic primary ===
No candidate qualified for the Democratic primary. 104 write-in votes and 480 blank ballots were cast.

=== General election ===
2024 Wyoming Senate District 4 general election
| Party | Candidate | Votes | % |
|---|---|---|---|
| Republican | Tara Nethercott (inc.) | 8,255 | 96.41% |
| Write-in | | 307 | 3.59% |
| Valid ballots | | 8,562 | 87.69% |
| Invalid or blank votes | | 1,202 | 12.31% |
| Total votes | | 9,764 | 100.00% |

== District 6 ==
=== Republican primary ===
==== Nominee ====
- Darin Smith, attorney, Christian Broadcasting Network executive and congressional candidate in 2016 and 2022

==== Candidates ====
- Gary Bjorklund, Air Force veteran
- Eric D. Johnston, farmer and Platte County, Wyoming commissioner (2015–2018)
- Taft C. Love, chair of the Laramie County, Wyoming Republican Party
- Marc Torriani, rancher and telecommunications worker
- Kim Withers, former CEO

==== Declined ====
- Anthony Bouchard, incumbent senator since 2017

==== Results ====
2024 Wyoming Senate District 6 Republican primary
| Party | Candidate | Votes | % |
|---|---|---|---|
| Republican | Darin Smith | 1,780 | 37.60% |
| Republican | Eric D. Johnston | 1,267 | 26.76% |
| Republican | Taft C. Love | 593 | 12.53% |
| Republican | Marc Torriani | 434 | 9.17% |
| Republican | Kim Withers | 383 | 8.09% |
| Republican | Gary Bjorklund | 264 | 5.58% |
| Write-in | | 13 | 0.28% |
| Valid ballots | | 4,734 | 98.18% |
| Invalid or blank votes | | 88 | 1.82% |
| Total votes | | 4,822 | 100.00% |

=== Democratic primary ===
No candidate qualified for the Democratic primary. 37 write-in votes and 281 blank ballots were cast.

=== General election ===
2024 Wyoming Senate District 6 general election
| Party | Candidate | Votes | % |
|---|---|---|---|
| Republican | Darin Smith | 8,484 | 95.48% |
| Write-in | | 402 | 4.52% |
| Valid ballots | | 8,886 | 89.41% |
| Invalid or blank votes | | 1,052 | 10.59% |
| Total votes | | 9,938 | 100.00% |

== District 8 ==
=== Republican primary ===
==== Nominee ====
- Jared Olsen, member of the Wyoming House of Representatives from the 11th district since 2017

==== Declined ====
- Affie Ellis, incumbent senator since 2017

==== Results ====
2024 Wyoming Senate District 8 Republican primary
| Party | Candidate | Votes | % |
|---|---|---|---|
| Republican | Jared Olsen | 1,222 | 92.44% |
| Write-in | | 100 | 7.56% |
| Valid ballots | | 1,322 | 89.02% |
| Invalid or blank votes | | 163 | 10.98% |
| Total votes | | 1,485 | 100.00% |

=== Democratic primary ===
==== Nominee ====
- Marguerite Herman, member of the Laramie County School District 1

==== Results ====
2024 Wyoming Senate District 8 Democratic primary
| Party | Candidate | Votes | % |
|---|---|---|---|
| Democratic | Marguerite Herman | 460 | 97.87% |
| Write-in | | 100 | 2.13% |
| Valid ballots | | 470 | 94.19% |
| Invalid or blank votes | | 29 | 5.81% |
| Total votes | | 499 | 100.00% |

=== General election ===
2024 Wyoming Senate District 8 general election
| Party | Candidate | Votes | % |
|---|---|---|---|
| Republican | Jared Olsen | 3,444 | 57.91% |
| Democratic | Marguerite Herman | 2,464 | 41.43% |
| Write-in | | 39 | 0.66% |
| Valid ballots | | 5,947 | 98.09% |
| Invalid or blank votes | | 116 | 1.91% |
| Total votes | | 6,063 | 100.00% |

== District 10 ==
=== Republican primary ===
==== Nominee ====
- Gary Crum, former Wyoming Cowboys football player

==== Candidates ====
- Keith Kennedy

==== Declined ====
- Dan Furphy, incumbent senator since 2021

==== Results ====
2024 Wyoming Senate District 10 Republican primary
| Party | Candidate | Votes | % |
|---|---|---|---|
| Republican | Gary Crum | 1,712 | 59.99% |
| Republican | Keith Kennedy | 1,129 | 39.56% |
| Write-in | | 13 | 0.46% |
| Valid ballots | | 2,854 | 96.81% |
| Invalid or blank votes | | 94 | 3.19% |
| Total votes | | 2,948 | 100.00% |

=== Democratic primary ===
==== Nominee ====
- Mike Selmer

==== Results ====
2024 Wyoming Senate District 10 Democratic primary
| Party | Candidate | Votes | % |
|---|---|---|---|
| Democratic | Mike Selmer | 670 | 99.26% |
| Write-in | | 5 | 0.74% |
| Valid ballots | | 675 | 96.29% |
| Invalid or blank votes | | 26 | 3.71% |
| Total votes | | 701 | 100.00% |

=== General election ===
2024 Wyoming Senate District 10 general election
| Party | Candidate | Votes | % |
|---|---|---|---|
| Republican | Gary Crum | 6,331 | 64.83% |
| Democratic | Mike Selmer | 3,405 | 34.87% |
| Write-in | | 30 | 0.31% |
| Valid ballots | | 9,766 | 97.87% |
| Invalid or blank votes | | 210 | 2.13% |
| Total votes | | 9,979 | 100.00% |

== District 12 ==
=== Republican primary ===
==== Nominee ====
- John Kolb, incumbent senator since 2021

==== Candidates ====
- Jeff Ramaj, businessman

==== Results ====
2024 Wyoming Senate District 12 Republican primary
| Party | Candidate | Votes | % |
|---|---|---|---|
| Republican | John Kolb (inc.) | 1,313 | 61.33% |
| Republican | Jeff Ramaj | 814 | 38.02% |
| Write-in | | 14 | 0.65% |
| Valid ballots | | 2,141 | 96.79% |
| Invalid or blank votes | | 71 | 3.21% |
| Total votes | | 2,212 | 100.00% |

=== Democratic primary ===
==== Nominee ====
- Kenilynn S. Zanetti, former member of the Wyoming House of Representatives from the 16th district (1995–2000)

==== Results ====
2024 Wyoming Senate District 12 Democratic primary
| Party | Candidate | Votes | % |
|---|---|---|---|
| Democratic | Kenilynn S. Zanetti | 356 | 99.72% |
| Write-in | | 1 | 0.28% |
| Valid ballots | | 357 | 95.45% |
| Invalid or blank votes | | 17 | 4.55% |
| Total votes | | 374 | 100.00% |

=== General election ===
2024 Wyoming Senate District 12 general election
| Party | Candidate | Votes | % |
|---|---|---|---|
| Republican | John Kolb (inc.) | 4,359 | 69.47% |
| Democratic | Kenilynn S. Zanetti | 1,873 | 29.85% |
| Write-in | | 43 | 0.69% |
| Valid ballots | | 6,275 | 95.18% |
| Invalid or blank votes | | 318 | 4.82% |
| Total votes | | 6,593 | 100.00% |

6275 318 6593 95.18 4.82

== District 14 ==
=== Republican primary ===
==== Nominee ====
- Laura Taliaferro Pearson, rancher and bus driver

==== Candidates ====
- Albert Sommers, Speaker of the Wyoming House of Representatives (2023–present), majority leader of the Wyoming House of Representatives (2021–2023) from the 20th district (2023–present)
- Bill Winney, perennial candidate

==== Declined ====
- Fred Baldwin, incumbent senator since 2017

==== Results ====
2024 Wyoming Senate District 14 Republican primary
| Party | Candidate | Votes | % |
|---|---|---|---|
| Republican | Laura Taliaferro Pearson | 2,212 | 46.70% |
| Republican | Albert Sommers | 2,025 | 42.75% |
| Republican | Bill Winney | 490 | 10.34% |
| Write-in | | 10 | 0.21% |
| Valid ballots | | 4,737 | 97.25% |
| Invalid or blank votes | | 134 | 2.75% |
| Total votes | | 4,871 | 100.00% |

=== Democratic primary ===
No candidate qualified for the Democratic primary. 27 write-in votes and 206 blank ballots were cast.

=== General election ===
2024 Wyoming Senate District 14 general election
| Party | Candidate | Votes | % |
|---|---|---|---|
| Republican | Laura Taliaferro Pearson | 8,025 | 94.20% |
| Write-in | | 494 | 5.80% |
| Valid ballots | | 8,519 | 86.79% |
| Invalid or blank votes | | 1,297 | 13.21% |
| Total votes | | 9,816 | 100.00% |

== District 16 ==
=== Republican primary ===
==== Nominee ====
- Dan Dockstader, President of the Wyoming Senate (2021–2023), Majority Leader of the Wyoming Senate (2019–2021) from the 16th district (2009–present), member of the Wyoming House of Representatives from the 16th district (2007–2009)

==== Results ====
2024 Wyoming Senate District 16 Republican primary
| Party | Candidate | Votes | % |
|---|---|---|---|
| Republican | Dan Dockstader (inc.) | 3,168 | 97.42% |
| Write-in | | 84 | 2.58% |
| Valid ballots | | 3,252 | 89.78% |
| Invalid or blank votes | | 370 | 10.22% |
| Total votes | | 3,622 | 100.00% |

=== Democratic primary ===
No candidate qualified for the Democratic primary. 19 write-in votes and 258 blank ballots were cast.

=== General election ===
2024 Wyoming Senate District 16 general election
| Party | Candidate | Votes | % |
|---|---|---|---|
| Republican | Dan Dockstader (inc.) | 8,830 | 97.00% |
| Write-in | | 274 | 3.00% |
| Valid ballots | | 9,104 | 82.62% |
| Invalid or blank votes | | 1,915 | 17.38% |
| Total votes | | 11,019 | 100.00% |

== District 18 ==
=== Republican primary ===
==== Nominee ====
- Tim French, incumbent senator (2021–present)

==== Candidates ====
- Landon Greer, member of the Cody, Wyoming city council (2013–2020)

==== Results ====
2024 Wyoming Senate District 18 Republican primary
| Party | Candidate | Votes | % |
|---|---|---|---|
| Republican | Tim French (inc.) | 3,192 | 57.81% |
| Republican | Landon Greer | 2,311 | 41.85% |
| Write-in | | 19 | 0.34% |
| Valid ballots | | 5,522 | 97.22% |
| Invalid or blank votes | | 158 | 2.78% |
| Total votes | | 5,680 | 100.00% |

=== Democratic primary ===
No candidate qualified for the Democratic primary. 15 write-in votes and 164 blank ballots were cast.

=== General election ===
2024 Wyoming Senate District 18 general election
| Party | Candidate | Votes | % |
|---|---|---|---|
| Republican | Tim French (inc.) | 8,568 | 94.43% |
| Write-in | | 505 | 5.57% |
| Valid ballots | | 9,073 | 83.02% |
| Invalid or blank votes | | 1,856 | 16.98% |
| Total votes | | 10,929 | 100.00% |

== District 20 ==
=== Republican primary ===
==== Nominee ====
- Ed Cooper, incumbent senator (2021–present)

==== Candidates ====
- Tom Olmstead

==== Results ====
2024 Wyoming Senate District 20 Republican primary
| Party | Candidate | Votes | % |
|---|---|---|---|
| Republican | Ed Cooper (inc.) | 2,652 | 51.96% |
| Republican | Tom Olmstead | 2,428 | 47.57% |
| Write-in | | 24 | 0.47% |
| Valid ballots | | 5104 | 96.30% |
| Invalid or blank votes | | 196 | 3.70% |
| Total votes | | 5,300 | 100.00% |

=== Democratic primary ===
No candidate qualified for the Democratic primary. 34 write-in votes and 259 blank ballots were cast.

=== General election ===
2024 Wyoming Senate District 20 general election
| Party | Candidate | Votes | % |
|---|---|---|---|
| Republican | Ed Cooper (inc.) | 8,236 | 97.17% |
| Write-in | | 240 | 2.83% |
| Valid ballots | | 8,476 | 88.34% |
| Invalid or blank votes | | 1,119 | 11.66% |
| Total votes | | 9,595 | 100.00% |

== District 22 ==
=== Republican primary ===
==== Nominee ====
- Barry Crago, member of the Wyoming House of Representatives from the 40th district (2021–present)

==== Candidates ====
- Mark Jennings, member of the Wyoming House of Representatives from the 30th district (2015–present)

==== Declined ====
- Dave Kinskey, incumbent senator (2014–present)

==== Results ====
2024 Wyoming Senate District 22 Republican primary
| Party | Candidate | Votes | % |
|---|---|---|---|
| Republican | Barry Crago | 3,107 | 55.25% |
| Republican | Mark Jennings | 2,500 | 44.45% |
| Write-in | | 17 | 0.30% |
| Valid ballots | | 5,624 | 98.01% |
| Invalid or blank votes | | 114 | 1.99% |
| Total votes | | 5,738 | 100.00% |

=== Democratic primary ===
No candidate qualified for the Democratic primary. 34 write-in votes and 246 blank ballots were cast.

=== General election ===
2024 Wyoming Senate District 22 general election
| Party | Candidate | Votes | % |
|---|---|---|---|
| Republican | Barry Crago | 8,599 | 93.95% |
| Write-in | | 554 | 6.05% |
| Valid ballots | | 9,153 | 86.04% |
| Invalid or blank votes | | 1,485 | 13.96% |
| Total votes | | 10,638 | 100.00% |

== District 24 ==
=== Republican primary ===
==== Nominee ====
- Troy McKeown, incumbent senator (2021–present)

==== Candidates ====
- Phil Christopherson, former CEO

==== Results ====
2024 Wyoming Senate District 24 Republican primary
| Party | Candidate | Votes | % |
|---|---|---|---|
| Republican | Troy McKeown (inc.) | 1,602 | 57.11% |
| Republican | Phil Christopherson | 1,192 | 42.50% |
| Write-in | | 11 | 0.39% |
| Valid ballots | | 2,805 | 95.96% |
| Invalid or blank votes | | 118 | 4.04% |
| Total votes | | 2,923 | 100.00% |

=== Democratic primary ===
No candidate qualified for the Democratic primary. 21 write-in votes and 88 blank ballots were cast.

=== General election ===
2024 Wyoming Senate District 24 general election
| Party | Candidate | Votes | % |
|---|---|---|---|
| Republican | Troy McKeown (inc.) | 5,305 | 92.15% |
| Write-in | | 452 | 7.85% |
| Valid ballots | | 5,757 | 81.93% |
| Invalid or blank votes | | 1,270 | 18.07% |
| Total votes | | 7,027 | 100.00% |

== District 26 ==
=== Republican primary ===
==== Nominee ====
- Tim Salazar, incumbent senator (2021–present)

==== Candidates ====
- Elizabeth Philp

==== Results ====
2024 Wyoming Senate District 26 Republican primary
| Party | Candidate | Votes | % |
|---|---|---|---|
| Republican | Tim Salazar (inc.) | 2,626 | 60.24% |
| Republican | Elizabeth Philp | 1,726 | 39.60% |
| Write-in | | 7 | 0.16% |
| Valid ballots | | 4,359 | 97.04% |
| Invalid or blank votes | | 133 | 2.96% |
| Total votes | | 4,492 | 100.00% |

=== Democratic primary ===
No candidate qualified for the Democratic primary. 26 write-in votes and 238 blank ballots were cast.

=== General election ===
2024 Wyoming Senate District 26 general election
| Party | Candidate | Votes | % |
|---|---|---|---|
| Republican | Tim Salazar (inc.) | 7,266 | 97.01% |
| Write-in | | 224 | 2.99% |
| Valid ballots | | 7,490 | 85.12% |
| Invalid or blank votes | | 1,309 | 14.88% |
| Total votes | | 8,799 | 100.00% |

== District 28 ==
=== Republican primary ===
==== Nominee ====
- James Lee Anderson, incumbent senator (2013–present)

==== Candidates ====
- Bryce Reece, lobbyist

==== Results ====
2024 Wyoming Senate District 28 Republican primary
| Party | Candidate | Votes | % |
|---|---|---|---|
| Republican | James Lee Anderson (inc.) | 1,304 | 50.23% |
| Republican | Bryce Reece | 1,274 | 49.08% |
| Write-in | | 18 | 0.69% |
| Valid ballots | | 2,596 | 93.92% |
| Invalid or blank votes | | 168 | 6.08% |
| Total votes | | 2,764 | 100.00% |

=== Democratic primary ===
No candidate qualified for the Democratic primary. 21 write-in votes and 235 blank ballots were cast.

=== General election ===
2024 Wyoming Senate District 28 general election
| Party | Candidate | Votes | % |
|---|---|---|---|
| Republican | James Lee Anderson (inc.) | 5,354 | 94.49% |
| Write-in | | 312 | 5.51% |
| Valid ballots | | 5,666 | 78.23% |
| Invalid or blank votes | | 1,578 | 21.77% |
| Total votes | | 7,244 | 100.00% |

== District 30 ==
=== Republican primary ===
==== Nominee ====
- Charles Scott, incumbent senator (1983–present)

==== Candidates ====
- Robert L. Hendry, former Natrona County, Wyoming commissioner
- Charles H. Schoenwolf

==== Results ====
2024 Wyoming Senate District 30 Republican primary
| Party | Candidate | Votes | % |
|---|---|---|---|
| Republican | Charles Scott (inc.) | 1,438 | 47.65% |
| Republican | Robert L. Hendry | 1,179 | 39.07% |
| Republican | Charles H. Schoenwolf | 394 | 13.06% |
| Write-in | | 7 | 0.23% |
| Valid ballots | | 3,018 | 95.24% |
| Invalid or blank votes | | 151 | 4.76% |
| Total votes | | 3,169 | 100.00% |

=== Democratic primary ===
No candidate qualified for the Democratic primary. 25 write-in votes and 162 blank ballots were cast.

=== General election ===
2024 Wyoming Senate District 30 general election
| Party | Candidate | Votes | % |
|---|---|---|---|
| Republican | Charles Scott (inc.) | 6,404 | 96.78% |
| Write-in | | 213 | 3.22% |
| Valid ballots | | 6,617 | 84.07% |
| Invalid or blank votes | | 1,254 | 15.93% |
| Total votes | | 7,871 | 100.00% |
