= Wayne Johnson (Wyoming politician) =

American politician (1942–2020)

Wayne Harold Johnson

Member of the Wyoming Senate from the 6th district
- In office January 2005 – January 10, 2017
- Preceded by: Jana H. Ginter
- Succeeded by: Anthony Bouchard

Member of the Wyoming House of Representatives from the 9th district
- In office January 1993 – January 2005
- Preceded by: Constituency established
- Succeeded by: Bryan Pedersen

Personal details
- Born: May 2, 1942 El Paso, Texas, U.S.
- Died: October 16, 2020 (aged 78) Cheyenne, Wyoming, U.S.
- Party: Republican
- Education: Utah State University; University of Colorado Boulder; University of Oklahoma

Wayne Harold Johnson (May 2, 1942 – October 16, 2020) was an American politician and a Republican member of the Wyoming Senate. He represented District 6 from 2005 until 2017. Johnson served previously from 1993 to 2005 in the Wyoming House of Representatives.

== Education ==
Johnson earned his Bachelor of Science in history from Utah State University in Logan, Utah, his Master of Public Administration from the University of Colorado at Boulder, Colorado, and his Master of Library Science from the University of Oklahoma at Norman, Oklahoma. He formerly was employed by the New Jersey Office of Legislative Services in Trenton, New Jersey, and the Laramie County Community College in Cheyenne.

== Elections ==
- 2012 Johnson won the August 21, 2012 Republican primary by a plurality of 42 votes with 1,551 votes (46.9%), and won the November 6, 2012 general election with 5,981 votes (70.9%) against Country Party candidate William Hill.
- 1992 Johnson won the 1992 Republican primary and won the November 3, 1992 general election against Democratic nominee Gary McDowell.
- 1994 Johnson was unopposed for both the 1994 Republican primary, and the November 8, 1994 general election.
- 1996 Johnson was unopposed for the 1996 Republican primary, having polled 898 votes, and won the November 5, 1996 general election with 2,156 votes (69.7%) against Democratic nominee Debbie Stamm.
- 1998 Johnson was unopposed for the August 18, 1998 Republican primary, winning with 888 votes, and was unopposed for the November 3, 1998 General election, winning with 2,287 votes.
- 2000 Johnson won the August 22, 2000 Republican primary with 740 votes (76.5%), and was unopposed for the November 7, 2000 general election, winning with 2,840 votes.
- 2002 Johnson won the August 20, 2002 Republican primary with 798 votes (73.6%), and was unopposed for the November 5, 2002 general election, winning with 2,581 votes.
- 2004 Democratic State Senator Rich Cathcart resigned, and Jana Ginter was appointed in his place. Johnson won the three-way August 17, 2004 Republican primary with 1,389 votes (38.4%), and won the November 2, 2004 general election with 5,108 votes (58.4%) against incumbent Democratic Ginter.
- 2008 Johnson was unopposed for the August 19, 2008 Republican primary, having prevailed with 2,269 votes, and won the November 4, 2008 general election with 6,400 votes (64.5%) against Democratic nominee Phyllis Sherard.
