= Senator Bouchard =

Senator Bouchard may refer to:

- Anthony Bouchard (fl. 2010s–2020s), Wyoming State Senate
- Mike Bouchard (born 1956), Michigan State Senate
- Télesphore-Damien Bouchard (1881–1962), Senate of Canada
