= 2022 United States House of Representatives election in Wyoming =

2022 United States House of Representatives election in Wyoming's at-large district
- November 8, 2022
- Turnout: 66.6% ▼
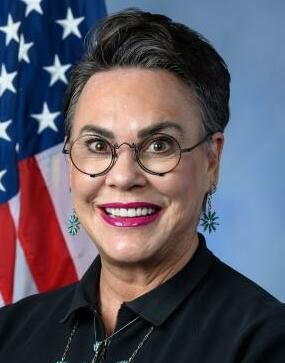

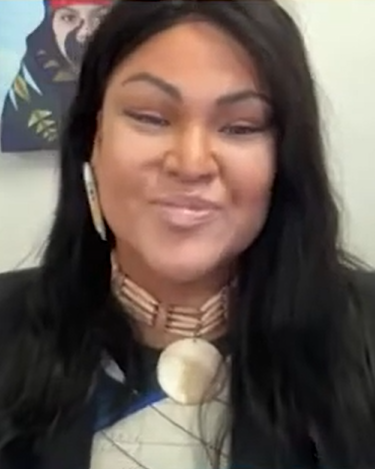
Nominee	Harriet Hageman	Lynnette Grey Bull
Party	Republican	Democratic
Popular vote	132,206	47,250
Percentage	68.18%	24.37%
- County results Hageman: 60–70% 70–80% 80–90% Grey Bull: 40–50% 60–70%
U.S. Representative before election
Liz Cheney
Republican
Elected U.S. Representative
Harriet Hageman
Republican

The 2022 United States House of Representatives election in Wyoming was held on November 8, 2022, to elect the U.S. representative for Wyoming's at-large congressional district. The election coincided with other elections to the House of Representatives, elections to the United States Senate, and various state and local elections.

Although incumbent Republican Liz Cheney had been reelected with 68.6% of the vote in 2020, she faced backlash from her party for her opposition to Donald Trump, vocal support of Trump's second impeachment, and vote in favor and service on the January 6th Committee. She was defeated by pro-Trump candidate Harriet Hageman in the Republican primary on August 16, 2022, with a landslide 66.3% of the vote going to Hageman. Cheney's margin of defeat marked the second-worst for a House incumbent in the last 60 years, behind that of South Carolina Republican Bob Inglis in a 2010 primary runoff. Democrats nominated nonprofit founder Lynnette Grey Bull, who was also their nominee in 2020.

As expected in the solidly Republican state of Wyoming, Hageman won in a landslide. However, Grey Bull did manage to flip Albany County, which she had lost in 2020.

== Background ==
Incumbent Liz Cheney was strongly criticized by supporters of former president Donald Trump for her vote to impeach him, as well as refusing to object to the certification of the Electoral College results in the 2020 presidential election. Following her impeachment vote, Florida Congressman Matt Gaetz appeared at a rally at the Wyoming State Capitol in support of ousting Cheney, with Donald Trump Jr. also supporting it by phone in January 2021. For the same reason, the Wyoming Republican Party later voted to censure her and requested that she resign or be primaried in the next election. Later that year, it also voted 31–29 to no longer recognize Cheney as a member due to her actions to participate in the January 6 Select Committee shortly after being removed as Conference Chair.

In February 2021, members of the Freedom Caucus attempted to have Cheney removed from her position as Chair of the House Republican Conference in response to her impeachment vote. In a secret ballot, 61 members of the conference voted to remove, while 145 voted not to remove. Cheney retained her position in large part because of the support by these Republicans, including House Minority Leader Kevin McCarthy and House Minority Whip Steve Scalise. Eventually, however, Cheney's continued criticism of Trump lost her support by more Republicans, including McCarthy and Scalise, and McCarthy was caught on a hot mic saying "I've had it with her" in reference to Cheney. On May 12, 2021, Cheney was removed from her position as conference chair by a voice vote and replaced with Elise Stefanik.

On May 21, 2021, challenger Anthony Bouchard admitted that as a teenager he fell in love with and started dating a 14-year-old girl who he subsequently impregnated and then married. Bouchard was 18 at the time. He claimed he went public with the story because he had learned that it was being investigated by others, though the Cheney campaign denied investigating it. He compared his relationship with the unnamed girl to "the Romeo and Juliet story." The two were married but divorced three years later, and she committed suicide at age 20. Bouchard continued to raise their son after her death, though he says the two are now estranged.

Cheney and Adam Kinzinger were censured by the Republican National Committee at its meeting in Salt Lake City on February 4, 2022, due to "actions in their positions as members of the January 6th Select Committee not befitting Republican members of Congress". The Wyoming delegation to the committee also submitted a "Rule 11" letter formalizing support for challenger Harriet Hageman and allowing the RNC to spend money allocated for Wyoming's party branch on her behalf. At the same time, support of Hageman surged following the censure of Cheney. Hageman has referred to Donald Trump as "racist and xenophobic" and also called him "the weakest candidate" during the 2016 presidential election; at the same time Hageman endorsed Cheney and called her a "proven, courageous, constitutional conservative."

Following Cheney's defeat, she called Hageman to concede the race. However, Hageman alleged that Cheney only left two words: "Hi Harriet". This prompted Cheney to release the full audio recording of the call which showed that she did, in fact, concede the race. The Hageman camp asserted that a technical glitch was at fault.

== Republican primary ==
=== Candidates ===
==== Nominee ====
- Harriet Hageman, lawyer, former member of the Republican National Committee and candidate for Governor of Wyoming in 2018

==== Eliminated in primary ====
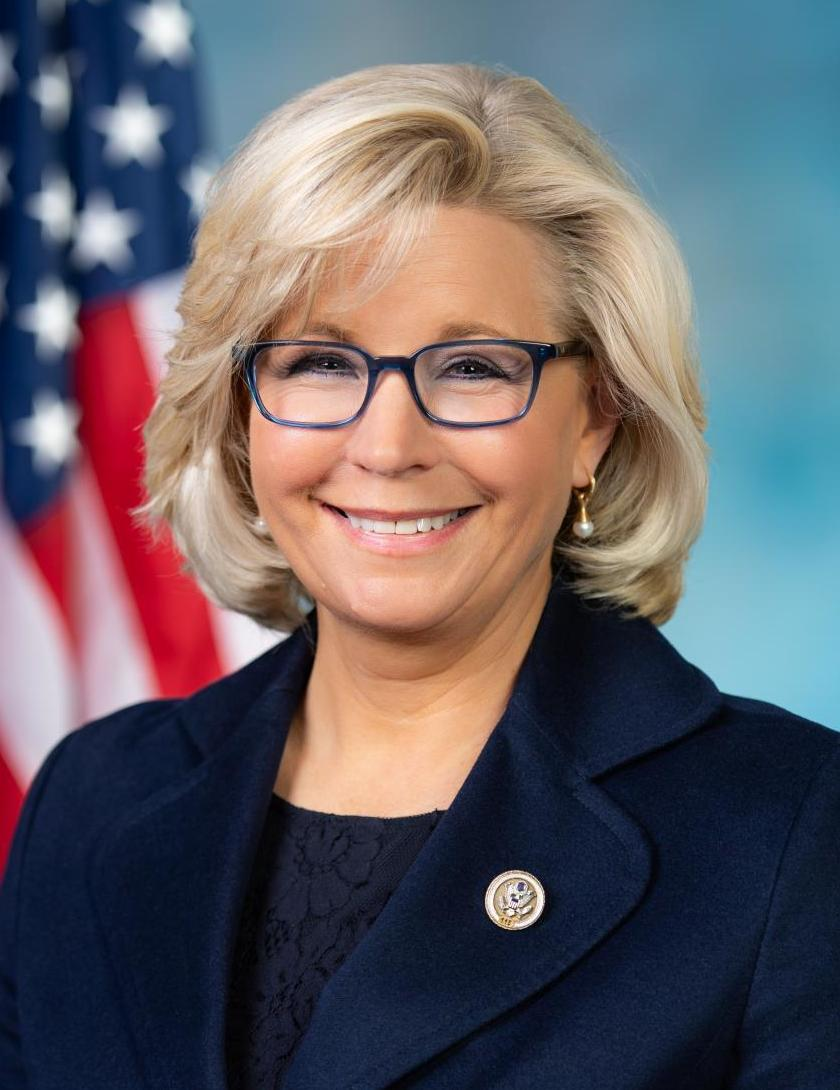
Incumbent U.S. Representative Liz Cheney lost the primary.

- Robyn Belinskey, businesswoman
- Anthony Bouchard, state senator from the 6th district
- Liz Cheney, incumbent U.S. Representative, vice chair of the House January 6 Committee and former chair of the House Republican Conference
- Denton Knapp, retired U.S. Army colonel

==== Withdrawn ====
- Chuck Gray, state representative for the 57th district (ran for Secretary of State)
- Bryan Miller, chair of the Sheridan County Republican Party and candidate for the U.S. Senate in 2014 and 2020 (endorsed Hageman)
- Darin Smith, attorney, Christian Broadcasting Network executive and candidate for this seat in 2016 (endorsed Hageman)

==== Declined ====
- Bo Biteman, state senator from the 21st district (endorsed Hageman)
- Edward Buchanan, Secretary of State of Wyoming
- William Perry Pendley, former acting director of the Bureau of Land Management

=== Endorsements ===
Map of endorsements by Republican members of the 117th United States Congress (by congressional district): Wyoming Cheney (including Democratic representatives Dean Phillips, Speaker Nancy Pelosi, and Tom Malinowski) Hageman

Anthony Bouchard

Individuals

- L. Brent Bozell III, Conservative activist and founder of the Media Research Center
Liz Cheney

Executive branch officials

- John Bolton, United States National Security Advisor (2018–2019), United States Ambassador to the United Nations (2005–2006)
- George W. Bush, 43rd president of the United States (2001–2009) and 46th governor of Texas (1995–2000)
- Dick Cheney, 46th vice president of the United States (2001–2009), 17th United States Secretary of Defense (1989–1993) and U.S. Representative for Wyoming's at-large district (1979–1989) (candidate's father)
- Alyssa Farah Griffin, former White House Director of Strategic Communications (2020)
- Kay Bailey Hutchison, former United States Ambassador to NATO (2017–2021) and former U.S. Senator from Texas (1993–2013)
- Cindy McCain, United States Ambassador to the United Nations Agencies for Food and Agriculture (2021–present)
- Karl Rove, former White House Deputy Chief of Staff for Policy (2005–2007) and former Senior Advisor to the President (2001–2007)
- Miles Taylor, Chief of Staff to the United States Secretary of Homeland Security (2019) (Forward)
- Christine Todd Whitman, Administrator of the Environmental Protection Agency (2001–2003) and Governor of New Jersey (1994–2001) (Forward)

U.S. senators

- Al Franken, U.S. Senator from Minnesota (2009–2018) (Democratic)
- Mitt Romney, U.S. Senator from Utah (2019–2025), Governor of Massachusetts (2003–2007), 2012 Republican presidential nominee
- Alan Simpson, U.S. Senator from Wyoming (1979–1997)

U.S. representatives

- John Boehner, former U.S. Representative for Ohio's 8th Congressional District (1991–2015), former Speaker of the United States House of Representatives (2011–2015), House Minority Leader (2007–2011), House Majority Leader (2006–2007), Chair of the House Republican Conference (1995–1999), and member of the Ohio House of Representatives for the 57th district (1985–1990)
- Adam Kinzinger, U.S. Representative for Illinois 11th (2011–2013) and 16th congressional district (2013–2023)
- Tom Malinowski, U.S. Representative for New Jersey's 7th congressional district (2019–2023) (Democratic)
- Dean Phillips, U.S. Representative for Minnesota's 3rd congressional district (2019–2025) (Democratic)
- Paul Ryan, former U.S. Representative for Wisconsin's 1st congressional district (1999–2019), former Speaker of the United States House of Representatives (2015–2019), and nominee for vice president of the United States in 2012

Governors

- Charlie Baker, Governor of Massachusetts (2015–2023)
- Mike Sullivan, Governor of Wyoming (1987–1995) (Democratic - registered as Republican to vote in primary)

Individuals

- Kevin Costner, actor
- E. J. Dionne, journalist
- O. J. Simpson, former football running back for Buffalo Bills and San Francisco 49ers, broadcaster, actor, and convicted felon

Organizations

- AIPAC
- Renew America Movement
Harriet Hageman

Executive branch officials

- Justin R. Clark, former Director of the Office of Intergovernmental Affairs (2017–2018) and the Office of Public Liaison (2018)
- Mercedes Schlapp, former White House Director of Strategic Communications (2017–2019)
- Bill Stepien, former White House Director of Political Affairs (2017–2018)
- Donald Trump, 45th President of the United States (2017–2021)
- Ryan Zinke, 52nd United States Secretary of the Interior (2017–2019), U.S. representative for Montana's at-large congressional district (2015–2017)

U.S. senators

- Marsha Blackburn, U.S. Senator from Tennessee (2019–present)
- Ted Cruz, U.S. Senator from Texas (2013–present)
- Josh Hawley, U.S. Senator from Missouri (2019–present)
- Cynthia Lummis, U.S. Senator from Wyoming (2021–present), U.S. representative for Wyoming's at-large congressional district (2009–2017), Treasurer of Wyoming (1999–2007)
- Rand Paul, U.S. Senator from Kentucky (2011–present)

U.S. representatives

- Mark Amodei, U.S. Representative for Nevada's 2nd congressional district (2011–present)
- Brian Babin, U.S. representative for Texas's 36th congressional district (2015–present)
- Jim Baird, U.S. representative for Indiana's 4th congressional district (2019–present)
- Jim Banks, Chair of the Republican Study Committee (2021–present) and U.S. representative for Indiana's 3rd congressional district (2017–present)
- Cliff Bentz, U.S. representative for Oregon's 2nd congressional district (2021–present)
- Jack Bergman, U.S. representative for Michigan's 1st congressional district (2017–present)
- Andy Biggs, Chair of the House Freedom Caucus and U.S. representative for Arizona's 5th congressional district (2017–present)
- Dan Bishop, U.S. representative for North Carolina's 9th congressional district (2019–2023)
- Lauren Boebert, U.S. representative for Colorado's 3rd congressional district (2021–present)
- Mike Bost, U.S. representative for Illinois's 12th congressional district (2021–present)
- Mo Brooks, U.S. representative for Alabama's 5th congressional district (2011–2023)
- Ted Budd, U.S. representative for North Carolina's 13th congressional district (2017–2023)
- Tim Burchett, U.S. representative for Tennessee's 2nd congressional district (2019–present)
- Michael Burgess, U.S. representative for Texas's 26th congressional district (2003–present)
- Kat Cammack, U.S. representative for Florida's 3rd congressional district (2021–present)
- Mike Carey, U.S. representative for Ohio's 15th congressional district (2021–present)
- Jerry Carl, U.S. representative for Alabama's 1st congressional district (2021–present)
- Buddy Carter, U.S. representative for Georgia's 1st congressional district (2015–present)
- Madison Cawthorn, U.S. representative for North Carolina's 11th congressional district (2021–2023)
- Ben Cline, U.S. representative for Virginia's 6th congressional district (2019–present)
- Michael Cloud, U.S. representative for Texas's 27th congressional district (2018–present)
- Barbara Cubin, U.S. Representative for Wyoming's at-large congressional district (1995–2009) and Secretary of the House Republican Conference (2001–2003)
- Warren Davidson, U.S. representative for Ohio's 8th congressional district (2016–present)
- Rodney Davis, U.S. representative for Illinois's 13th congressional district (2013–2023)
- Byron Donalds, U.S. representative for Florida's 19th congressional district (2021–present)
- Jeff Duncan, U.S. representative for South Carolina's 3rd congressional district (2011–present)
- Ron Estes, U.S. representative for Kansas's 4th congressional district (2017–present)
- Pat Fallon, U.S. representative for Texas's 4th congressional district (2021–present)
- Michelle Fischbach, U.S. representative for Minnesota's 7th congressional district (2021–present)
- Scott L. Fitzgerald, U.S. representative for Wisconsin's 5th congressional district (2021–present)
- Chuck Fleischmann, U.S. representative for Tennessee's 3rd congressional district (2011–present)
- Virginia Foxx, U.S. representative for North Carolina's 5th congressional district (2019–present)
- Russ Fulcher, U.S. representative for Idaho's 1st congressional district (2019–present)
- Matt Gaetz, U.S. representative for Florida's 1st congressional district (2017–present)
- Andrew Garbarino, U.S. representative for New York's 2nd congressional district (2021–present)
- Bob Gibbs, U.S. representative for Ohio's 7th congressional district (2011–2023)
- Carlos Giménez, U.S. representative for Florida's 26th congressional district (2021–2023)
- Lance Gooden, U.S. representative for Texas's 5th congressional district (2019–present)
- Kay Granger, Vice Chair of the House Republican Conference (2007–2009) and U.S. representative for Texas's 12th congressional district (1997–present)
- Sam Graves, U.S. representative for Missouri's 6th congressional district (2001–present)
- Mark E. Green, U.S. representative for Tennessee's 7th congressional district (2019–present)
- Glenn Grothman, U.S. representative for Wisconsin's 6th congressional district (2015–present)
- Diana Harshbarger, U.S. representative for Tennessee's 1st congressional district (2021–present)
- Vicky Hartzler, U.S. representative for Missouri's 4th congressional district (2011–2023)
- Kevin Hern, U.S. representative for Oklahoma's 1st congressional district (2018–present)
- Yvette Herrell, U.S. representative for New Mexico's 2nd congressional district (2021–2023)
- Jody Hice, U.S. representative for Georgia's 10th congressional district (2015–present)
- Clay Higgins, U.S. representative for Louisiana's 3rd congressional district (2017–present)
- Richard Hudson, Secretary of the House Republican Conference (2021–present) and U.S. representative for North Carolina's 8th congressional district (2013–2023)
- Bill Huizenga, U.S. representative for Michigan's 2nd congressional district (2011–2023)
- Darrell Issa, U.S. representative for California's 50th congressional district (2021–present)
- Ronny Jackson, U.S. Representative for Texas's 13th congressional district (2021–present)
- Chris Jacobs, U.S. representative for New York's 27th congressional district (2020–2023)
- Jim Jordan, U.S. representative for Ohio's 4th congressional district (2007–present)
- John Joyce, U.S. representative for Pennsylvania's 13th congressional district (2019–present)
- Fred Keller, U.S. representative for Pennsylvania's 12th congressional district (2019–2023)
- Mike Kelly, U.S. representative for Pennsylvania's 16th congressional district (2011–present)
- Doug LaMalfa, U.S. representative for California's 1st congressional district (2013–present)
- Debbie Lesko, U.S. representative for Arizona's 8th congressional district (2018–present)
- Billy Long, U.S. representative for Missouri's 7th congressional district (2011–2023)
- Barry Loudermilk, U.S. representative for Georgia's 11th congressional district (2015–present)
- Frank Lucas, U.S. representative for Oklahoma's 3rd congressional district (2003–present) and former representative for Oklahoma's 6th congressional district (1994–2003)
- Brian Mast, U.S. representative for Florida's 18th congressional district (2017–2023)
- Kevin McCarthy, Minority Leader of the U.S. House of Representatives (2019–2023) and U.S. Representative for California's 23rd congressional district (2007–2023)
- Lisa McClain, U.S. representative for Michigan's 10th congressional district (2021–2023)
- Tom McClintock, U.S. representative for California's 4th congressional district (2009–present)
- Dan Meuser, U.S. representative for Pennsylvania's 9th congressional district (2019–present)
- Carol Miller, U.S. representative for West Virginia's 3rd congressional district (2019–2023)
- Jeff Miller, U.S. representative for Florida's 1st congressional district (2001–2017)
- Mary Miller, U.S. representative for Illinois's 15th congressional district (2021–present)
- Barry Moore, U.S. representative for Alabama's 2nd congressional district (2021–present)
- Markwayne Mullin, U.S. representative for Oklahoma's 2nd congressional district (2013–2023)
- Greg Murphy, U.S. representative for North Carolina's 3rd congressional district (2019–present)
- Troy Nehls, U.S. representative for Texas's 22nd congressional district (2021–present)
- Ralph Norman, U.S. representative for South Carolina's 5th congressional district (2017–present)
- Burgess Owens, U.S. representative for Utah's 4th congressional district (2021–present)
- Steven Palazzo, U.S. representative for Mississippi's 4th congressional district (2011–2023)
- Gary Palmer, U.S. representative for Alabama's 6th congressional district (2019–present)
- Scott Perry, Chair of the House Freedom Caucus (2022–present), U.S. representative for Pennsylvania's 10th congressional district (2019–present), former U.S. representative for Pennsylvania's 4th congressional district (2013–2019)
- Bill Posey, U.S. representative for Florida's 8th congressional district (2013–present), former U.S. representative for Florida's 15th congressional district (2009–2013)
- Guy Reschenthaler, U.S. representative for Pennsylvania's 14th congressional district (2019–present)
- John Rose, U.S. representative for Tennessee's 6th congressional district (2019–present)
- Matt Rosendale, U.S. representative for Montana's at-large congressional district (2021–present)
- John Rutherford, U.S. representative for Florida's 4th congressional district (2017–present)
- Mike Simpson, U.S. representative for Idaho's 2nd congressional district (1999–present)
- Chris Smith, U.S. representative for New Jersey's 4th congressional district (1981–present)
- Jason Smith, U.S. representative for Missouri's 8th congressional district (2013–present), former Secretary of the House Republican Conference (2017–2021)
- Lloyd Smucker, U.S. representative for Pennsylvania's 11th congressional district (2019–present), former U.S. representative for Pennsylvania's 16th congressional district (2017–2019)
- Victoria Spartz, U.S. representative for Indiana's 5th congressional district (2021–present)
- Pete Stauber, U.S. representative for Minnesota's 8th congressional district (2019–present)
- Elise Stefanik, House Republican Conference Chair (2021–present) and U.S. Representative for New York's 21st congressional district (2015–present)
- Greg Steube, U.S. representative for Florida's 17th congressional district (2019–present)
- Marjorie Taylor Greene, U.S. representative for Georgia's 14th congressional district (2021–present)
- Claudia Tenney, U.S. representative for New York's 22nd congressional district (2017–2019), (2021–present)
- Tom Tiffany, U.S. representative for Wisconsin's 7th congressional district (2020–present)
- William Timmons, U.S. representative for South Carolina's 4th congressional district (2019–present)
- Jeff Van Drew, U.S. representative for New Jersey's 2nd congressional district (2019–present)
- Tim Walberg, U.S. representative for Michigan's 7th congressional district (2007–2009), (2011–2023)
- Jackie Walorski, U.S. representative for Indiana's 2nd congressional district (2013–2022), (Deceased)
- Randy Weber, U.S. representative for Texas's 14th congressional district (2013–present)
- Brad Wenstrup, U.S. representative for Ohio's 2nd congressional district (2013–present)
- Joe Wilson, U.S. representative for South Carolina's 2nd congressional district (2001–present)

State and local officials

- John Bear, state representative for the 31st district (2021–present)
- Scott Clem, former state representative for the 31st district (2015–2021)
- Timothy Hallinan, state representative for the 32nd district (2007–2011, 2017–present)
- Marti Halverson, former state representative for the 22nd district (2013–2019)
- Jeremy Haroldson, state representative for the 4th district (2021–present)
- Hans Hunt, former state representative for 2nd district (2011–2021)
- Bill McIlvain, former Speaker of the Wyoming House of Representatives (1989–1991) and state representative (1969–1973, 1977–1990)
- Chip Neiman, state representative for the 1st district (2021–present)
- Tom Reeder, former state senator for the 58th district (2011–2017)
- Rachel Rodriguez-Williams, state representative for the 50th district (2021–present)
- Tim Salazar, state senator for the 26th district (2021–present) and former state representative for the 34th district (2017–2021)
- Cheri Steinmetz, state senator for the 3rd district (2019–present) and former state representative for the 5th district (2015–2019)
- Clarence Styvar, state representative for the 12th district (2018–present)
- J. D. Williams, state representative for the 2nd district (2021–present)

Individuals

- Corey Lewandowski, political operative, lobbyist, political commentator, and author
- Mike Lindell, founder and CEO of My Pillow
- Sean Reyes, Attorney General of Utah (2013–present)
- Matt Schlapp, chairman of the American Conservative Union
- Peter Thiel, co-founder of PayPal and venture capitalist
- Donald Trump Jr., businessman

Organizations

- American Conservative Union
- Campaign for Working Families
- Club for Growth PAC
- Gun Owners of America
Chuck Gray (withdrawn)

U.S. representatives

- Paul Gosar, U.S. Representative for Arizona's 4th congressional district (2011–present)

State officials

- John Bear, state representative for the 31st district (2019–present)
- Bill Fortner, state representative for the 52nd district (2021–present)
- Jeremy Haroldson, state representative for the 4th district (2021–present)
- Mark Jennings, state representative for the 30th district (2015–present)
- Chip Neiman, state representative for the 1st district (2019–present)
- Rachel Rodriguez-Williams, state representative for the 12th district (2021–present)
- Clarence Styvar, state representative for the 12th district (2019–present)
- John Winter, state representative for the 28th district (2019–present)

Individuals

- Dick Morris, pundit
- Lin Wood, attorney

=== Debates and forums ===
Wyoming PBS has had a tradition of hosting one debate for each for the Democratic and Republican primaries for all candidates on the ballot in their respective primaries, as well as one general election debate for all candidates on the ballot. All Republican candidates on the ballot who did not withdraw were included in the sole debate. This debate was not open to the public, but was open to media outlets. Due to Liz Cheney's role as Vice Chair in the hearings for the United States House Select Committee on the January 6 Attack which were broadcast, different MSNBC hosts would later show debate clips of her defending her work in the committee.

2022 Wyoming Republican U.S. Representative primary debates
No.	Date	Host	Moderator	Link	Participants							
P Participant A Absent N Non-invitee I Invitee W Withdrawn												
P Participant A Absent N Non-invitee I Invitee W Withdrawn					Liz Cheney	Robyn Belinskey	Anthony Bouchard	Harriet Hageman	Denton Knapp	Chuck Gray	Bryan Miller	Darin Smith
1	June 30, 2022	Wyoming PBS	Bob Beck; Steve Peck; Craig Blumenshine; Steven Dahl		P	P	P	P	P	W	W	W

=== Polling ===
Aggregate polls

Source of poll aggregation	Dates administered	Dates updated	Anthony Bouchard	Liz Cheney	Harriet Hageman	Undecided (Note: Calculated by taking the difference of 100% and all other candidates combined.)	Margin
RealClearPolitics	July 7 – August 6, 2022	August 12, 2022	3.5%	29.0%	54.5%	13.0%	Hageman +25.5

Graphical summary

Poll source	Date(s) administered	Sample size (Note: Key: A – all adults RV – registered voters LV – likely voters V – unclear)	Margin of error	Anthony Bouchard	Liz Cheney	Chuck Gray	Harriet Hageman	Darin Smith	Other	Undecided
University of Wyoming	July 25 – August 6, 2022	562 (LV)	± 4.1%	2%	28%	–	57%	–	1% (Note: Knapp with 1%; Belinskey with 0%)	12%
WPA Intelligence (R) (Note: This poll was sponsored by Club for Growth Action, which opposes Cheney)	July 12–14, 2022	400 (LV)	± 4.9%	5% (Note: Turnout scenario with registered Democrats as 13% of primary voters)	31%	–	59%	–	–	5%
WPA Intelligence (R)	July 12–14, 2022	400 (LV)	± 4.9%	5% (Note: Turnout scenario with registered Democrats as 20% of primary voters)	36%	–	54%	–	–	5%
WPA Intelligence (R)	July 12–14, 2022	400 (LV)	± 4.9%	5% (Note: Turnout scenario with registered Democrats as 25% of primary voters)	39%	–	51%	–	–	5%
Mason-Dixon	July 7–11, 2022	1,100 (LV)	± 3.0%	5%	30%	–	52%	–	2% (Note: Belinskey and Knapp with 1%)	11%
Fabrizio Lee (R) (Note: This poll was sponsored by Wyoming Values PAC, which supports Hageman)	June 1–2, 2022	400 (LV)	± 4.9%	8%	28%	–	56%	–	<1% (Note: Belinskey and Knapp with <1%)	7%
WPA Intelligence (R)	May 24–25, 2022	400 (LV)	± 4.9%	12%	26%	–	56%	–	–	6%
Fabrizio Lee (R)	December 14–15, 2021	400 (LV)	± 4.9%	13%	26%	–	34%	–	2% (Note: Belinskey and Knapp with 1%)	26%
	September 14, 2021	Gray suspends his campaign								
	September 9, 2021	Smith withdraws and endorses Hageman								
McLaughlin & Associates (R) (Note: This poll was sponsored by Gray's campaign)	July 26, 2021	300 (LV)	± 5.6%	17%	23%	18%	–	7%	5% (Note: Buchanan with 3%, Biteman with 2%)	30%
McLaughlin & Associates (R)	July 26, 2021	300 (LV)	± 5.6%	–	23%	25%	–	14%	–	39%
McLaughlin & Associates (R)	July 26, 2021	300 (LV)	± 5.6%	–	24%	63%	–	–	–	14%
Remington Research Group (R) (Note: This poll was sponsored by Smith's campaign)	July 25–26, 2021	766 (LV)	± 3.3%	18%	19%	14%	–	24%	–	25%
Remington Research Group (R)	July 25–26, 2021	766 (LV)	± 3.3%	–	20%	–	–	70%	–	10%
McLaughlin & Associates (R) (Note: This poll was sponsored by Save America PAC)	January 25–26, 2021	– (LV) (Note: Republican primary subsample of a poll of 500 likely general election voters (margin of error ± 4.4%))	–	28%	21%	17%	–	–	–	34%
McLaughlin & Associates (R)	January 25–26, 2021	– (LV)	–	50%	23%	–	–	–	–	27%
McLaughlin & Associates (R)	January 25–26, 2021	– (LV)	–	–	23%	50%	–	–	–	27%

=== Results ===
Results by county: Hageman: 50–60%; 60–70%; 70–80%; 80–90%; Cheney: 50–60%; 70–80%

Republican primary results August 16, 2022
Party	Candidate	Votes	%
Republican	Harriet Hageman	113,079	66.3%
Republican	Liz Cheney (incumbent)	49,339	28.9%
Republican	Anthony Bouchard	4,508	2.6%
Republican	Denton Knapp	2,258	1.3%
Republican	Robyn Belinskey	1,306	0.8%
Total votes		170,490	100.0

== Democratic primary ==
=== Candidates ===
==== Nominee ====
- Lynnette Grey Bull, nonprofit founder, member of the Northern Arapaho tribe, and nominee in 2020

==== Eliminated in primary ====
- Steve Helling, attorney and pro-Trump activist
- Meghan Jensen, chair of the Sweetwater County Democratic Party

=== Debates and forums ===
2022 Wyoming Democratic U.S. Representative primary debates
No.	Date	Host	Moderators	Link	Participants		
P Participant A Absent N Non-invitee I Invitee W Withdrawn							
P Participant A Absent N Non-invitee I Invitee W Withdrawn					Lynnette Grey Bull	Meghan Jensen	Steve Helling
1	August 4, 2022	Wyoming PBS	Bob Beck; Steve Peck; Craig Blumenshine		P	P	P

=== Results ===
Results by county: Grey Bull: 40–50%; 50–60%; 60–70%; 70–80%

Democratic primary results August 16, 2022
Party	Candidate	Votes	%
Democratic	Lynnette Grey Bull	4,507	62.3
Democratic	Meghan Jensen	1,833	25.3
Democratic	Steve Helling	897	12.4
Total votes		7,237	100.0

== Independent and third-party candidates ==
=== Constitution Party ===
==== Nominee ====
- Marissa Selvig, former mayor of Pavillion

==== Eliminated at convention ====
- Joe Shogrin, Laramie County contact for the Wyoming Constitution Party

=== Libertarian Party ===
==== Nominee ====
- Richard Brubaker, nominee for this seat in 2012, 2014, 2018, and 2020

=== Independents ===
==== Failed to qualify for ballot ====
- Casey William Hardison, chemist

== General election ==
In the general election, Hageman faced Democratic nominee and Native American activist Lynnette Grey Bull, who was Cheney's opponent in 2020. However, Hageman was overwhelmingly favored in November. Republicans had a nearly 7-to-1 advantage in registration over Democrats, and Trump carried the state in 2020 with almost 70 percent of the vote, his strongest state-level performance in the nation.

Hageman won the 2022 election. She is the fourth consecutive Republican woman to represent Wyoming in the House. Barbara Cubin won the seat in 1994, followed by Cynthia Lummis in 2008, followed by Cheney in 2016, and followed by Hageman.

=== Predictions ===
Source	Ranking	As of
The Cook Political Report	Solid R	October 25, 2022
Inside Elections	Solid R	October 11, 2021
Sabato's Crystal Ball	Safe R	October 5, 2021
Politico	Solid R	April 5, 2022
RCP	Safe R	June 9, 2022
Fox News	Solid R	July 11, 2022
DDHQ	Solid R	July 20, 2022
538	Solid R	June 30, 2022

=== Debate ===
2022 Wyoming U.S. House of Representatives debate
No.	Date	Host	Moderator	Link	Republican	Democratic	Libertarian	Constitution
Key: P Participant A Absent N Not invited I Invited W Withdrawn								
Key: P Participant A Absent N Not invited I Invited W Withdrawn					Harriet Hageman	Lynette Grey Bull	Richard Brubaker	Marissa Selvig
1	Oct. 13, 2022	Central Wyoming College; Wyoming PBS; Wyoming Public Media	Craig Blumenshine		A	P	P	P

=== Post-primary endorsements ===
Declined to endorse

U.S. representatives

- Liz Cheney, WY-AL (2017–2023) (Republican; declined to endorse Hageman)

=== Polling ===
Poll source	Date(s) administered	Sample size	Margin of error	Harriet Hageman (R)	Lynnette Grey Bull (D)	Others	Undecided
University of Wyoming	October 22 – November 3, 2022	436 (LV)	–	62%	23%	4% (Note: Richard Brubaker (L) with 3%; Marissa Selvig (C) with 1%)	11%

=== Results ===
2022 Wyoming's at-large congressional district election
Party	Candidate	Votes	%	±%
Republican	Harriet Hageman	132,206	68.18%	−0.37
Democratic	Lynnette Grey Bull	47,250	24.37%	−0.22
Libertarian	Richard Brubaker	5,420	2.80%	−0.95
Write-in		4,521	2.33%	+2.14
Constitution	Marissa Selvig	4,505	2.32%	−0.60
Total votes		193,902	100.00%	N/A
Republican hold				

==== By county ====
County	Harriet Hageman Republican		Lynnette Grey Bull Democratic		Richard Brubaker Libertarian		Marissa Selvig Constitution		Write-in		Margin		Total votes
County	#	%	#	%	#	%	#	%	#	%	#	%	Total votes
Albany	5,699	45.17	6,085	48.23	306	2.43	214	1.70	313	2.48	-386	3.06	12,617
Big Horn	3,449	81.46	504	11.90	97	2.29	108	2.55	76	1.79	2,945	69.56	4,234
Campbell	10,446	84.07	1,215	9.78	320	2.58	268	2.16	177	1.42	9,231	74.29	12,426
Carbon	3,434	73.33	892	19.05	170	3.63	126	2.69	61	1.30	2,542	54.28	4,683
Converse	4,044	80.00	602	11.91	129	2.55	209	4.13	71	1.40	3,442	68.09	5,055
Crook	2,814	85.82	306	9.33	69	2.10	51	1.56	39	1.19	2,508	76.49	3,279
Fremont	8,539	63.66	3,519	26.23	420	3.13	686	5.11	250	1.86	5,020	37.43	13,414
Goshen	3,835	79.04	766	15.79	86	1.77	76	1.57	89	1.83	3,069	63.25	4,852
Hot Springs	1,641	75.31	367	16.84	55	2.52	74	3.40	42	1.93	1,274	58.47	2,179
Johnson	3,003	77.82	601	15.57	100	2.59	61	1.58	94	2.44	2,402	62.25	3,859
Laramie	17,539	58.91	9,572	32.15	914	3.07	863	2.90	883	2.97	7,967	26.76	29,771
Lincoln	6,118	81.69	998	13.33	159	2.12	112	1.50	102	1.36	5,120	68.36	7,489
Natrona	15,399	68.69	5,235	23.35	656	2.93	478	2.13	649	2.90	10,164	45.34	22,417
Niobrara	936	86.43	75	6.93	16	1.48	39	3.60	17	1.57	861	79.50	1,083
Park	9,658	76.22	1,922	15.17	313	2.47	216	1.70	562	4.44	7,736	61.05	12,671
Platte	3,107	78.18	603	15.17	81	2.04	118	2.97	65	1.64	2,504	63.01	3,974
Sheridan	8,497	70.33	2,704	22.38	312	2.58	218	1.80	351	2.91	5,793	47.95	12,082
Sublette	2,768	77.97	604	17.01	71	2.00	48	1.35	59	1.66	2,164	60.96	3,550
Sweetwater	8,362	70.71	2,555	21.60	493	4.17	225	1.90	191	1.62	5,807	49.11	11,826
Teton	2,957	29.38	6,447	64.05	335	3.33	67	0.67	259	2.57	-3,490	-34.67	10,065
Uinta	5,119	78.18	987	15.07	178	2.72	161	2.46	103	1.57	5,260	63.08	9,107
Washakie	2,430	80.04	435	14.33	93	3.06	43	1.42	35	1.15	1,995	65.71	3,036
Weston	2,412	86.39	256	9.17	47	1.68	44	1.58	33	1.18	2,156	77.22	2,792
Totals	132,206	68.18	47,250	24.37	5,420	2.80	4,505	2.32	4,521	2.33	84,956	43.81	193,902

Counties that flipped from Republican to Democratic

- Albany (largest municipality: Laramie)

== Notes ==
Partisan clients
