= Senator Cathcart (disambiguation) =

Charles W. Cathcart (1809–1888) was a U.S. Senator from Indiana from 1852 to 1853. Senator Cathcart may also refer to:

- Mary Cathcart (born 1942), Maine State Senate
- Rich Cathcart (born 1946), Wyoming State Senate
