= Kathleen Davison =

Wyoming politician

Members of the Wyoming House of Representatives
- In office 2005–2014
- Preceded by: Stan Cooper
- Succeeded by: Fred Baldwin
- Constituency: 20th district (2005-2012); 18th district (2013-2014)

Personal details
- Party: Republican

Kathleen A. Davison (born October 1, 1945) is an American Republican politician from Kemmerer, Lincoln County, Wyoming. She represented the 20th district in the Wyoming House of Representatives from 2005 to 2012, and then represented the 18th district from 2013 to 2014.

In 2009, Davison sponsored legislation to criminalize assisted suicide and increase penalties for killing pregnant women.

Davison is a member of the Church of Jesus Christ of Latter-day Saints. She's a Republican.
