= 2020 United States House of Representatives election in Wyoming =

2020 United States House of Representatives election in Wyoming's at-large district
- November 3, 2020
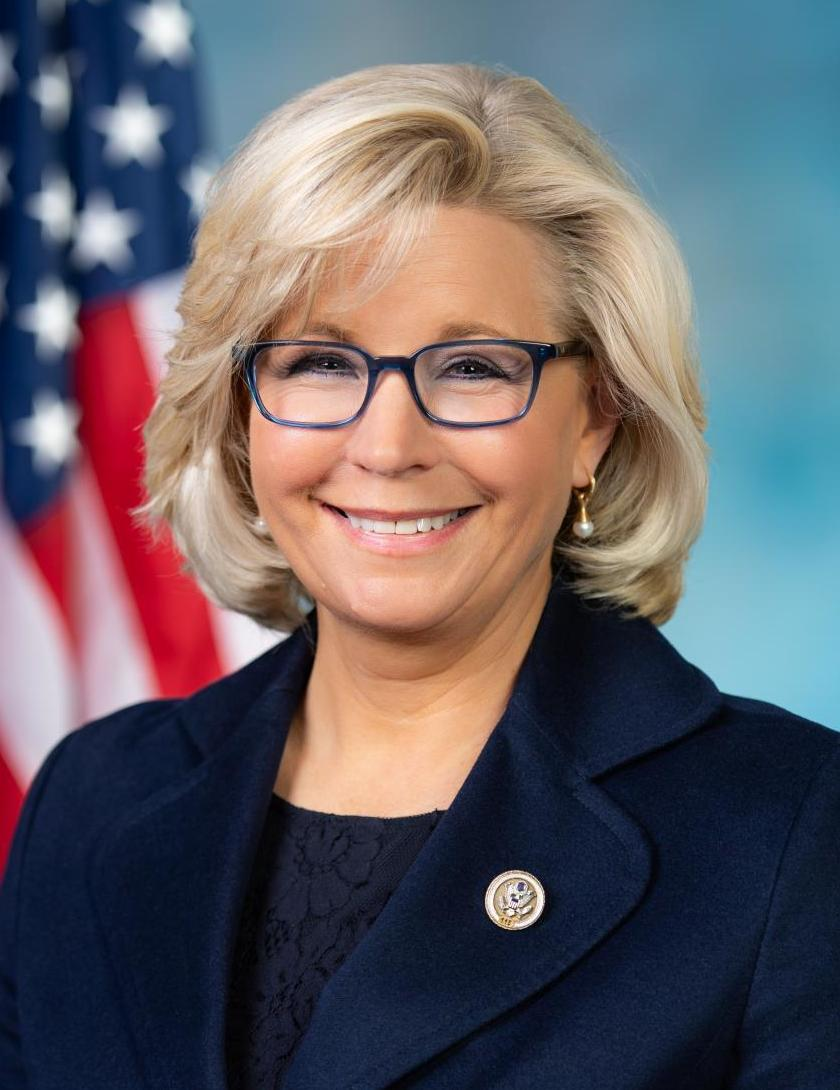

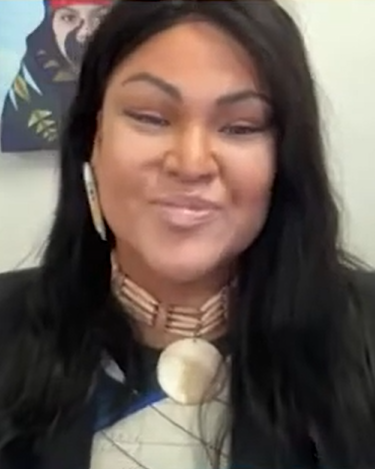
Nominee	Liz Cheney	Lynnette Grey Bull
Party	Republican	Democratic
Popular vote	185,732	66,576
Percentage	68.56%	24.58%
- Cheney: 40–50% 50–60% 60–70% 70–80% 80–90% >90% Grey Bull: 40–50% 50–60% 60–70% 70–80% No data
U.S. Representative before election
Liz Cheney
Republican
Elected U.S. Representative
Liz Cheney
Republican

The 2020 United States House of Representatives election in Wyoming was held on November 3, 2020, to elect the U.S. representative from Wyoming's at-large congressional district. The election coincided with the 2020 U.S. presidential election, as well as other elections to the House of Representatives, elections to the United States Senate, and various state and local elections.

== Republican primary ==
=== Candidates ===
==== Nominee ====
- Liz Cheney, incumbent U.S. representative

==== Eliminated in primary ====
- Blake Stanley, rancher

=== Endorsements ===
Liz Cheney

Organizations

- Maggie's List

=== Results ===
Results by county: Cheney: 60–70%; 70–80%

Republican primary results
Party	Candidate	Votes	%
Republican	Liz Cheney (incumbent)	78,870	73.46
Republican	Blake Stanley	28,039	26.12
Write-in		454	0.42
Total votes		107,363	100.00

== Democratic primary ==
=== Candidates ===
==== Nominee ====
- Lynnette Grey Bull, activist and member of the Northern Arapaho tribe

==== Eliminated in primary ====
- Carl Beach, international educator
- Carol Hafner, retired educator and progressive activist

==== Declined ====
- Dave Freudenthal, former governor of Wyoming

=== Endorsements ===
Lynnette Grey Bull

Federal officials

- Deb Haaland, U.S. representative from New Mexico's 1st congressional district

State officials

- Liisa Anselmi-Dalton, state senator from the 12th district
- Stan Blake, state representative from the 39th district
- Cathy Connolly, Minority Leader of the Wyoming House of Representatives from the 13th district
- JoAnn Dayton-Selman, state representative from the 17th district

Organizations

- Sierra Club

=== Results ===
Results by county: Grey Bull: 40–50%; 50–60%; 60–70%; 70–80%

Democratic primary results
Party	Candidate	Votes	%
Democratic	Lynnette Grey Bull	14,153	60.03
Democratic	Carol Hafner	5,172	21.94
Democratic	Carl Beach	4,107	17.42
Write-in		144	0.61
Total votes		23,576	100.00

== General election ==
=== Debates ===
- Complete video of debate, October 8, 2020

=== Predictions ===
Source	Ranking	As of
The Cook Political Report	Safe R	November 2, 2020
Inside Elections	Safe R	October 28, 2020
Sabato's Crystal Ball	Safe R	November 2, 2020
Politico	Safe R	November 2, 2020
Daily Kos	Safe R	November 2, 2020
RCP	Safe R	November 2, 2020

=== Polling ===
Poll source	Date(s) administered	Sample size (Note: Key: A – all adults RV – registered voters LV – likely voters V – unclear)	Margin of error	Liz Cheney (R)	Lynette Grey Bull (D)	Undecided
University of Wyoming	October 8–28, 2020	614 (LV)	± 4%	58%	28%	–

=== Results ===
Wyoming's at-large congressional district, 2020
Party	Candidate	Votes	%	±%
Republican	Liz Cheney (incumbent)	185,732	68.56%	+4.98%
Democratic	Lynnette Grey Bull	66,576	24.58%	−5.19%
Libertarian	Richard Brubaker	10,154	3.75%	+0.31%
Constitution	Jeff Haggit	7,905	2.92%	−0.10%
Write-in		525	0.19%	±0.00%
Total votes		270,892	100.0%	N/A
Republican hold				

==== By county ====
County	Liz Cheney Republican		Lynnette Grey Bull Democratic		Richard Brubaker Libertarian		Jeff Haggit Constitution		Write-in		Margin		Total votes
County	#	%	#	%	#	%	#	%	#	%	#	%	Total votes
Albany	8,629	47.34	8,440	46.31	737	4.04	392	2.15	28	0.15	189	1.04	18,226
Big Horn	4,587	81.33	724	12.84	143	2.54	180	3.19	6	0.11	3,863	68.49	5,640
Campbell	15,732	83.00	1,713	9.04	735	3.88	694	3.66	80	0.42	14,019	73.96	18,954
Carbon	4,644	71.36	1,337	20.54	313	4.81	204	3.13	10	0.15	3,307	50.81	6,508
Converse	5,418	80.08	785	11.60	254	3.75	293	4.33	16	0.24	4,633	68.48	6,766
Crook	3,442	85.07	337	8.33	117	2.89	141	3.48	9	0.22	3,105	76.74	4,046
Fremont	11,505	64.62	5,227	29.36	711	3.99	335	1.88	26	0.15	6,278	35.26	17,804
Goshen	4,722	76.97	1,037	16.90	159	2.59	210	3.42	7	0.11	3,685	60.07	6,135
Hot Springs	1,915	75.90	424	16.81	105	4.16	76	3.01	3	0.12	1,491	59.10	2,523
Johnson	3,715	77.35	792	16.49	186	3.87	107	2.23	3	0.06	2,923	60.86	4,803
Laramie	27,641	61.99	13,863	31.09	1,790	4.01	1,198	2.69	100	0.22	13,778	30.90	44,592
Lincoln	8,324	80.93	1,429	13.89	262	2.55	259	2.52	11	0.11	6,895	67.04	10,285
Natrona	24,214	70.47	7,454	21.69	1,652	4.81	961	2.80	78	0.23	16,760	48.78	34,359
Niobrara	1,053	81.69	145	11.25	31	2.40	58	4.50	2	0.16	908	70.44	1,289
Park	12,374	75.91	2,874	17.63	511	3.13	505	3.10	36	0.22	9,500	58.28	16,300
Platte	3,589	74.44	868	18.00	142	2.94	215	4.46	7	0.14	2,721	56.44	4,821
Sheridan	11,588	72.31	3,460	21.59	578	3.61	373	2.33	27	0.17	8,128	50.72	16,026
Sublette	3,729	76.89	837	17.26	128	2.64	149	3.07	7	0.14	2,892	59.63	4,850
Sweetwater	11,097	68.72	3,680	22.79	733	4.54	611	3.78	26	0.16	7,417	45.93	16,147
Teton	5,210	36.30	8,628	60.11	383	2.67	116	0.81	16	0.11	-3,418	-23.81	14,353
Uinta	6,781	74.46	1,521	16.70	269	2.95	522	5.73	14	0.15	5,260	57.76	9,107
Washakie	3,063	77.74	599	15.20	143	3.63	126	3.20	9	0.23	2,464	62.54	3,940
Weston	2,760	80.75	402	11.76	72	2.11	180	5.27	4	0.12	2,358	68.99	3,418
Totals	185,732	68.56	66,576	24.58	10,154	3.75	7,905	2.92	525	0.19	119,156	43.99	270,892

Counties that flipped from Democratic to Republican

- Albany (largest municipality: Laramie)
