= Laura Taliaferro Pearson =

American politician

Member of the Wyoming Senate from the 14th district
- Incumbent
- Assumed office January 6, 2025
- Preceded by: Fred Baldwin

Personal details
- Party: Republican

Laura Taliaferro Pearson is an American politician who is member-elect of the Wyoming Senate from the 14th district. In 2024, she defeated the Speaker of the Wyoming House of Representatives, Albert Sommers, in the Republican primary in an upset. Before entering politics, she was a rancher and bus driver.

== Electoral history ==
2024 Wyoming Senate District 14 Republican primary
Party	Candidate	Votes	%
Republican	Laura Taliaferro Pearson	2,212	46.70%
Republican	Albert Sommers	2,025	42.75%
Republican	Bill Winney	490	10.34%
Write-in		10	0.21%
Valid ballots		4,737	97.25%
Invalid or blank votes		134	2.75%
Total votes		4,871	100.00%

2024 Wyoming Senate District 14 general election
Party	Candidate	Votes	%
Republican	Laura Taliaferro Pearson	8,025	94.20%
Write-in		494	5.80%
Valid ballots		8,519	86.79%
Invalid or blank votes		1,297	13.21%
Total votes		9,816	100.00%
