= Wyoming's 18th House of Representatives district =

American legislative district

Wyoming's 18th State House of Representatives district
- Wyoming's 18th House of Representatives district as of 2022
Representative
Scott Heiner; R–Green River
- Demographics: 90% White; 4% Hispanic; 5% Multiracial
- Population (2022): 10,972

Wyoming's 18th House of Representatives district is one of 62 districts in the Wyoming House of Representatives. The district encompasses parts of Lincoln, Sweetwater, and Uinta counties. It is represented by Republican Representative Scott Heiner of Green River.

In 1992, the state of Wyoming switched from electing state legislators by county to a district-based system.

== List of members representing the district ==
Representative	Party	Term	Note
Elwin McGrew	Democratic	1993 – 1995	Elected in 1992.
John Eyre	Republican	1993 – 2003	Elected in 1994. Re-elected in 1996. Re-elected in 1998. Re-elected in 2000.
Mick Powers	Republican	2003 – 2007	Elected in 2002. Re-elected in 2004.
Allen Jaggi	Republican	2007 – 2013	Elected in 2006. Re-elected in 2008. Re-elected in 2010.
Kathleen Davison	Republican	2013 – 2015	Elected in 2012.
Fred Baldwin	Republican	2015 – 2017	Elected in 2014.
Thomas Crank	Republican	2017 – 2021	Elected in 2016. Re-elected in 2018.
Scott Heiner	Republican	2021 – present	Elected in 2020. Re-elected in 2022. Re-elected in 2024.
Kenneth Roberts	Republican	2027 – member-elect	Elected in 2026.

== Recent election results ==
=== 2014 ===
House district 18 general election
Party	Candidate	Votes	%
Republican	Fred Baldwin	2,297	75.95%
Democratic	Michele Irwin	719	23.77%
Write-ins		8	0.26%
Total votes		3,024	100.0%
Invalid or blank votes		124	
Republican hold			

=== 2016 ===
House district 18 general election
Party	Candidate	Votes	%
Republican	Thomas Crank	3,595	80.17%
Democratic	Michele Irwin	880	19.62%
Write-ins		9	0.20%
Total votes		4,484	100.0%
Invalid or blank votes		188	
Republican hold			

=== 2018 ===
House district 18 general election
Party	Candidate	Votes	%
Republican	Thomas Crank (Incumbent)	3,088	98.34%
Write-ins		52	1.65%
Total votes		3,140	100.0%
Invalid or blank votes		581	
Republican hold			

=== 2020 ===
House district 18 general election
Party	Candidate	Votes	%
Republican	Scott Heiner	3,981	96.27%
Write-ins		154	3.72%
Total votes		4,135	100.0%
Invalid or blank votes		671	
Republican hold			

=== 2022 ===
House district 18 general election
Party	Candidate	Votes	%
Republican	Scott Heiner (Incumbent)	2,689	81.70%
Democratic	Dennis B. Laughlin	590	17.92%
Write-ins		12	0.36%
Total votes		3,291	100.0%
Invalid or blank votes		227	
Republican hold			

=== 2024 ===
House district 18 general election
Party	Candidate	Votes	%
Republican	Scott Heiner (Incumbent)	3,781	97.04%
Write-ins		115	2.95%
Total votes		3,896	100.0%
Invalid or blank votes		636	
Republican hold			

== Historical district boundaries ==
Map	Description	Apportionment Plan	Notes
	Sweetwater County (part); Uinta County (part)	1992 Apportionment Plan	
	Sweetwater County (part); Uinta County (part)	2002 Apportionment Plan	
	Lincoln County (part); Sweetwater County (part); Uinta County (part)	2012 Apportionment Plan	
