= Rita Campbell =

American politician

Member of the Wyoming House of Representatives from the 34th district
- In office January 11, 2011 – January 10, 2017
- Preceded by: Frank Philp
- Succeeded by: Tim Salazar

Personal details
- Party: Republican
- Education: Mount Mary College

Rita Campbell is an American politician and a former Republican member of the Wyoming House of Representatives representing District 34 from 2011 to 2017. She did not seek re-election in 2016.

== Education ==
Campbell attended Mount Mary College (now Mount Mary University).

== Elections ==
- 2014: Campbell won the August 19, 2014 Republican Primary with 892 votes (42.4%), and was unopposed for the November 4, 2014 General election.
- 2012: Campbell won the August 21, 2012 Republican Primary with 1,020 votes (56.4%), and was unopposed for the November 6, 2012 General election, winning with 3,797 votes.
- 2010: When Republican Representative Frank Philp retired and left the District 34 seat open, Campbell won the four-way August 17, 2010 Republican Primary with 908 votes (41.3%), and won the November 2, 2010 General election with 2,727 votes (78.6%) against Libertarian candidate Richard Brubaker, who had sought the seat in 2006 and 2008.
