= Scott Heiner =

American politician and pastor

Majority Leader of the Wyoming House of Representatives
- Incumbent
- Assumed office January 14, 2025
- Preceded by: Chip Neiman

Member of the Wyoming House of Representatives from the 18th district
- Incumbent
- Assumed office January 12, 2021
- Preceded by: Thomas Crank
- Succeeded by: Kenneth Roberts (elect)

Personal details
- Born: Afton, Wyoming, U.S.
- Party: Republican
- Education: Utah State University (BS)

Scott Heiner is an American politician and Republican member of the Wyoming House of Representatives, representing the 18th district since January 12, 2021.

== Career ==
On August 18, 2020, Heiner defeated incumbent state representative, Thomas Crank, in the Republican primary for the Wyoming House of Representatives seat representing the 18th district by ten votes. He had challenged Crank twice before. On November 3, 2020, Heiner was elected to this position, unopposed. Heiner was sworn in on January 4, 2021.

He was defeated in the Republican primary for the 2026 Wyoming House of Representatives election.

== Personal life ==
Heiner lives in Green River, Wyoming. He has a wife named Paula, 7 children, and 13 grandchildren. He is a member of The Church of Jesus Christ of Latter-day Saints.

Wyoming House of Representatives
Preceded by Chip Neiman	Majority Leader of the Wyoming House of Representatives; 2025–present	Incumbent
