= Wyoming's 6th State Senate district =

American legislative district

- Wyoming's 6th State Senate district as of 2022
Senator
Taft Love; R–Cheyenne
- Demographics: 85% White; 10% Hispanic; 4% Multiracial
- Population (2022): 18,364

Wyoming's 6th State Senate district is one of 31 districts in the Wyoming Senate. The district encompasses Platte County as well as part of Laramie County. It is represented by Republican Senator Taft Love of Cheyenne.

In 1992, the state of Wyoming switched from electing state legislators by county to a district-based system.

== List of members representing the district ==
Representative	Party	Term	Note
Rich Cathcart	Democratic	1993 – 2004	Elected in 1992. Re-elected in 1996. Re-elected in 2000. Resigned in 2004.
Jana H. Ginter	Democratic	2004 – 2005	Appointed in 2004.
Wayne Johnson	Republican	2005 – 2017	Elected in 2004. Re-elected in 2008. Re-elected in 2012.
Anthony Bouchard	Republican	2017 – 2025	Elected in 2016. Re-elected in 2020.
Darin Smith	Republican	2025	Elected in 2024. Resigned in 2025.
Taft Love	Republican	2025 – present	Appointed in 2025.

== Recent election results ==
=== 2008 ===
Senate district 6 general election
Party	Candidate	Votes	%
Republican	Wayne Johnson (incumbent)	6,400	67.41%
Democratic	Phyllis Sherard	3,078	32.42%
Write-ins		15	0.15%
Total votes		9,493	100.0%
Invalid or blank votes		424	
Republican hold			

=== 2012 ===
Senate district 6 general election
Party	Candidate	Votes	%
Republican	Wayne Johnson (incumbent)	5,981	75.12%
Wyoming Country	William R. Hill	1,663	20.88%
Write-ins		317	3.98%
Total votes		7,961	100.0%
Invalid or blank votes		773	
Republican hold			

=== 2016 ===
Senate district 6 general election
Party	Candidate	Votes	%
Republican	Anthony Bouchard	4,670	51.87%
Independent	Kym Zwonitzer	4,314	47.92%
Write-ins		18	0.19%
Total votes		9,002	100.0%
Invalid or blank votes		525	
Republican hold			

=== 2020 ===
Senate district 6 general election
Party	Candidate	Votes	%
Republican	Anthony Bouchard (incumbent)	6,879	64.68%
Democratic	Britney Wallesch	3,724	35.01%
Write-ins		32	0.30%
Total votes		10,635	100.0%
Invalid or blank votes		382	
Republican hold			

=== 2024 ===
2024 Wyoming Senate District 6 general election
Party	Candidate	Votes	%
Republican	Darin Smith	8,484	95.48%
Write-in		402	4.52%
Valid ballots		8,886	89.41%
Invalid or blank votes		1,052	10.59%
Total votes		9,938	100.00%

== Historical district boundaries ==
Map	Description	Apportionment Plan	Notes
	Laramie County (part)	1992 Apportionment Plan	
	Laramie County (part)	2002 Apportionment Plan	
	Goshen County (part); Laramie County (part)	2012 Apportionment Plan	
