= Wyoming's 14th State Senate district =

American legislative district

- Wyoming's 14th State Senate district as of 2022
Senator
Laura Taliaferro Pearson; R–Kemmerer
- Demographics: 90% White; 6% Hispanic; 3% Multiracial
- Population (2022): 20,209

Wyoming's 14th State Senate district is one of 31 districts in the Wyoming Senate. The district encompasses Sublette County as well as parts of Lincoln, Sweetwater, and Uinta counties. It is represented by Republican Senator Laura Taliaferro Pearson of Kemmerer.

In 1992, the state of Wyoming switched from electing state legislators by county to a district-based system.

== List of members representing the district ==
Representative	Party	Term	Note
Mark O. Harris	Democratic	1993 – 2002	Elected in 1992. Re-elected in 1996. Re-elected in 2000. Resigned in 2002.
Larry Caller	Democratic	2002 – 2005	Appointed in 2002.
Stan Cooper	Republican	2005 – 2017	Elected in 2004. Re-elected in 2008. Re-elected in 2012.
Fred Baldwin	Republican	2017 – 2025	Elected in 2016. Re-elected in 2020.
Laura Taliaferro Pearson	Republican	2025 – present	Elected in 2024.

== Recent election results ==
=== 2008 ===
Senate district 14 general election
Party	Candidate	Votes	%
Republican	Stan Cooper (incumbent)	7,250	98.69%
Write-ins		96	1.30%
Total votes		7,346	100.0%
Invalid or blank votes		1,168	
Republican hold			

=== 2012 ===
Senate district 14 general election
Party	Candidate	Votes	%
Republican	Stan Cooper (incumbent)	6,766	87.03%
Wyoming Country	John Vincent Love	978	12.58%
Write-ins		30	0.38%
Total votes		7,774	100.0%
Invalid or blank votes		621	
Republican hold			

=== 2016 ===
Senate district 14 general election
Party	Candidate	Votes	%
Republican	Fred Baldwin	6,939	84.69%
Democratic	Charlotte Sedey	1,237	15.09%
Write-ins		17	0.20%
Total votes		8,193	100.0%
Invalid or blank votes		447	
Republican hold			

=== 2020 ===
Senate district 14 general election
Party	Candidate	Votes	%
Republican	Fred Baldwin (incumbent)	7,779	97.06%
Write-ins		235	2.93%
Total votes		8,014	100.0%
Invalid or blank votes		1,284	
Republican hold			

=== 2024 ===
Senate district 14 general election
Party	Candidate	Votes	%
Republican	Laura Taliaferro Pearson	8,025	94.20%
Write-ins		494	5.79%
Total votes		8,519	100.0%
Invalid or blank votes		1,297	
Republican hold			

== Historical district boundaries ==
Map	Description	Apportionment Plan	Notes
	Sweetwater County (part); Uinta County (part)	1992 Apportionment Plan	
	Lincoln County (part); Sublette County (part); Sweetwater County (part); Uinta County (part)	2002 Apportionment Plan	
	Lincoln County (part); Sublette County (part); Sweetwater County (part); Uinta County (part)	2012 Apportionment Plan	
