= Louie Tomassi =

American politician

Member of the Wyoming House of Representatives from the 20th district
- In office January 12, 1993 – January 14, 2003
- Succeeded by: Stan Cooper

Personal details
- Born: November 6, 1923 Dawson, New Mexico
- Died: November 16, 2008 (aged 85) Big Piney, Wyoming
- Party: Republican

Louie Tomassi (November 6, 1923 – November 16, 2008) was an American politician who served in the Wyoming House of Representatives from the 20th district from 1993 to 2003.

He died on November 16, 2008, in Big Piney, Wyoming, at age 85.
