= Darin Smith =

American politician

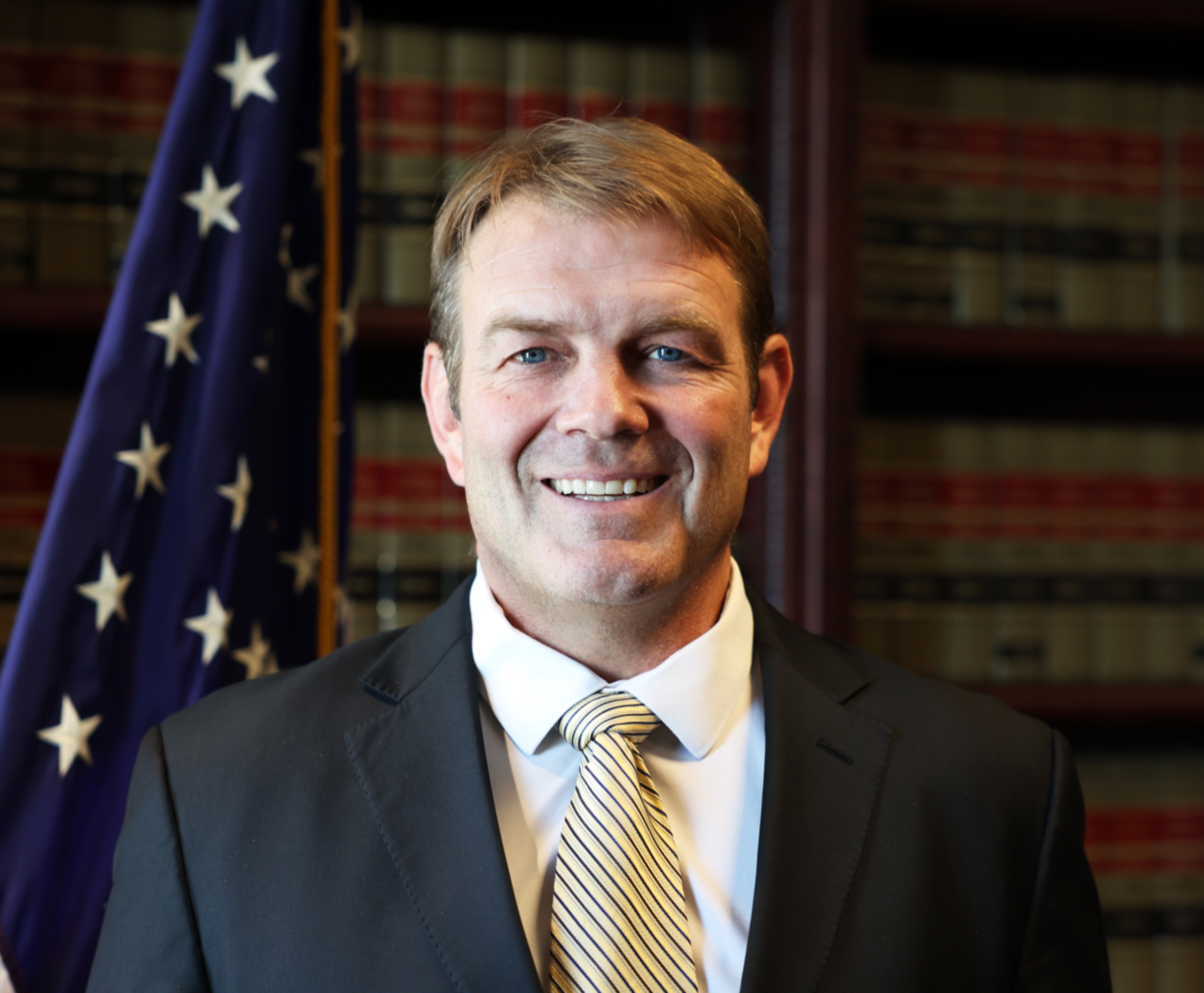

United States Attorney for the District of Wyoming
- Incumbent
- Assumed office August 11, 2025; Interim: August 11, 2025 – May 28, 2026
- President: Donald Trump
- Preceded by: Stephanie Sprecher (acting)

Member of the Wyoming Senate from the 6th district
- In office January 6, 2025 – August 11, 2025
- Preceded by: Anthony Bouchard
- Succeeded by: Taft Love

Personal details
- Born: Laramie, WY
- Party: Republican
- Spouse: Alicia Short
- Children: 5
- Education: University of Wyoming (BA, JD)
- Occupation: Lawyer, politician

Darin Dale Smith is an American attorney and politician who is the Senate-confirmed United States Attorney for the District of Wyoming since 2026. He is a former member of the Wyoming Senate from the 6th district. A member of the Republican Party, he was elected in 2024 after being endorsed by Donald Trump. He was later appointed by Trump as interim U.S. Attorney in August 2025 before being confirmed by the Senate on May 18, 2026. He worked as an executive at the Christian Broadcasting Network for 11 years and was a candidate for Wyoming's at-large congressional district in 2016 and 2022.

== Early life and education ==
Smith was born in Laramie, Wyoming, and was raised in Rock Springs. He graduated from the University of Wyoming in 1996, where he was on the wrestling team and was an Honorable Mention Academic All-American in 1994 and 1995. Smith received a Juris Doctor from the University of Wyoming College of Law in 2000.

== Personal life ==
Smith is a Christian. He is married to Alicia Smith. Together they have five children. One of his sons attends the United States Naval Academy and another son attends the United States Military Academy.

== Electoral history ==
2024 Wyoming Senate District 6 Republican primary
Party	Candidate	Votes	%
Republican	Darin Smith	1,780	37.60%
Republican	Eric D. Johnston	1,267	26.76%
Republican	Taft C. Love	593	12.53%
Republican	Marc Torriani	434	9.17%
Republican	Kim Withers	383	8.09%
Republican	Gary Bjorklund	264	5.58%
Write-in		13	0.28%
Valid ballots		4,734	98.18%
Invalid or blank votes		88	1.82%
Total votes		4,822	100.00%

=== General election ===
2024 Wyoming Senate District 6 general election
Party	Candidate	Votes	%
Republican	Darin Smith	8,484	95.47%
Write-in		402	4.52%
Valid ballots		8,886	89.41%
Invalid or blank votes		1,052	10.58%
Total votes		9,938	100.00%
