= Kenneth Roberts (Wyoming politician) =

American politician

Member of the Wyoming House of Representatives from the 18th district
- member-elect
- Assumed office January 4, 2027
- Preceded by: Scott Heiner

Personal details
- Party: Republican
- Website: Campaign website

Kenneth (Ken) D. Roberts is an American politician. A member of the Republican Party, he is the member-elect of the Wyoming House of Representatives for the 18th district. He was elected at the 2026 election. He is clerk of the district court in Lincoln County, Wyoming. He served on the Wyoming Game and Fish Commission.
