= Jana H. Ginter =

Wyoming politician

Member of the Wyoming Senate from the 6th district
- In office 2004–2004
- Preceded by: Rich Cathcart
- Succeeded by: Wayne Johnson

Personal details
- Party: Democratic

Jana Howard Ginter (born 1962 or 1963) is an American Democratic politician from Cheyenne, Wyoming. She represented 6th district in the Wyoming Senate in 2004.

On May 17, 2004, incumbent Democratic State Senator Rich Cathcart resigned. There were three candidates to finish his unexpired term. Ginter was appointed to the state senate by the Laramie County by May 27. Ginter ran in the primary unopposed for the 2004 election. She was defeated for re-election by Republican Wayne Johnson in the general election.
