= Wyoming's 20th House of Representatives district =

American legislative district

Wyoming's 20th State House of Representatives district
- Wyoming's 20th House of Representatives district as of 2022
Representative
Mike Schmid; R–La Barge
- Demographics: 90% White; 7% Hispanic; 2% Multiracial
- Population (2022): 9,430

Wyoming's 20th House of Representatives district is one of 62 districts in the Wyoming House of Representatives. The district encompasses Sublette County as well as part of Lincoln County. It is represented by Republican Representative Mike Schmid of La Barge.

In 1992, the state of Wyoming switched from electing state legislators by county to a district-based system.

== List of members representing the district ==
Representative	Party	Term	Note
Louie Tomassi	Republican	1993 – 2003	Elected in 1992. Re-elected in 1994. Re-elected in 1996. Re-elected in 1998. Re-elected in 2000.
Stan Cooper	Republican	2003 – 2005	Elected in 2002.
Kathy Davison	Republican	2005 – 2013	Elected in 2004. Re-elected in 2006. Re-elected in 2008. Re-elected in 2010.
Albert Sommers	Republican	2013 – 2025	Elected in 2012. Re-elected in 2014. Re-elected in 2016. Re-elected in 2018. Re-elected in 2020. Re-elected in 2022.
Mike Schmid	Republican	2025 – present	Elected in 2024.

== Recent election results ==
=== 2014 ===
House district 20 general election
Party	Candidate	Votes	%
Republican	Albert Sommers (Incumbent)	2,554	99.30%
Write-ins		18	0.69%
Total votes		2,572	100.0%
Invalid or blank votes		355	
Republican hold			

=== 2016 ===
House district 20 general election
Party	Candidate	Votes	%
Republican	Albert Sommers (Incumbent)	3,268	86.40%
Democratic	Jeanne Brown	504	13.32%
Write-ins		10	0.26%
Total votes		3,782	100.0%
Invalid or blank votes		186	
Republican hold			

=== 2018 ===
House district 20 general election
Party	Candidate	Votes	%
Republican	Albert Sommers (Incumbent)	2,749	98.95%
Write-ins		29	1.04%
Total votes		2,778	100.0%
Invalid or blank votes		273	
Republican hold			

=== 2020 ===
House district 20 general election
Party	Candidate	Votes	%
Republican	Albert Sommers (Incumbent)	3,939	98.37%
Write-ins		65	1.62%
Total votes		4,004	100.0%
Invalid or blank votes		488	
Republican hold			

=== 2022 ===
House district 20 general election
Party	Candidate	Votes	%
Republican	Albert Sommers (Incumbent)	3,273	91.96%
Write-ins		286	8.03%
Total votes		3,559	100.0%
Invalid or blank votes		294	
Republican hold			

=== 2024 ===
House district 20 general election
Party	Candidate	Votes	%
Republican	Mike Schmid	4,354	94.94%
Write-ins		232	5.05%
Total votes		4,586	100.0%
Invalid or blank votes		698	
Republican hold			

== Historical district boundaries ==
Map	Description	Apportionment Plan	Notes
	Lincoln County (part); Sublette County (part)	1992 Apportionment Plan	
	Lincoln County (part); Sublette County (part); Sweetwater County (part)	2002 Apportionment Plan	
	Sublette County (part)	2012 Apportionment Plan	
