= Thomas Crank =

American politician

Member of the Wyoming House of Representatives from the 18th district
- In office January 10, 2017 – January 4, 2021
- Preceded by: Fred Baldwin
- Succeeded by: Scott Heiner

Personal details
- Born: 1960 (age 65–66) Laramie, Wyoming, U.S.
- Party: Republican
- Children: 2
- Education: University of Wyoming
- Profession: Engineer

Thomas Crank is an American politician and former Wyoming state legislator. A member of the Republican Party, Crank represented the 18th district in the Wyoming House of Representatives from 2017 to 2021.

== Elections ==
=== 2016 ===
When incumbent Republican Representative Fred Baldwin announced his retirement to run for the Wyoming Senate, Crank declared his candidacy. He faced candidates Scott Heiner, Zem Hopkins, Kevin Simpson, and Lyle Williams in the Republican primary. Crank initially won the primary by 42 votes, but primary voters in one Sweetwater County precinct received the wrong ballot, leading Wyoming Secretary of State Ed Murray to call a special election. While candidate Scott Heiner won the most votes in the special election, it was not enough to make up for the deficit, making Crank the winner with 32% of the vote. Crank defeated Democratic nominee Michele Irwin in the general election with 80% of the vote.
