= Pepper Ottman =

American politician

Member of the Wyoming House of Representatives from the 34th district
- Incumbent
- Assumed office January 12, 2021
- Preceded by: Tim Salazar

Personal details
- Party: Republican

Pepper L. Ottman is a Republican member of the Wyoming House of Representatives, representing the 34th District since January 12, 2021.

== Career ==
Ottman was the Fremont County Republican Party chairwoman. As of September 11, 2020 she had served in this position for four years. On November 3, 2020, Ottman was elected to the Wyoming House of Representatives seat representing the 34th district, unopposed. Ottman was sworn in on January 4, 2021.

On December 10, 2020, Ottman signed on to a letter to Wyoming Governor Mark Gordon, urging him to engage Wyoming in the Texas lawsuit, Texas v. Pennsylvania, which sought to challenge Joe Biden's victory in the 2020 presidential election in the United States Supreme Court.
