= Stan Cooper =

American politician

Member of the Wyoming Senate from the 14th district
- In office January 11, 2005 – January 10, 2017
- Preceded by: Larry Caller
- Succeeded by: Fred Baldwin

Member of the Wyoming House of Representatives from the 20th district
- In office January 14, 2003 – January 11, 2005
- Preceded by: Louie Tomassi
- Succeeded by: Kathy Davison

Personal details
- Born: September 21, 1940 (age 85) McKeesport, Pennsylvania
- Party: Republican
- Spouse: Julie Cooper
- Children: 5
- Education: Utah State University
- Occupation: Businessman

Stan Cooper (born September 21, 1940) is a former Wyoming State Senator, representing District 14 from 2005 until 2017.

== Early life and education ==
Cooper was born in McKeesport, Pennsylvania and graduated from Utah State University in 1967 with a bachelor's degree in business administration. From 1975 to 1994, he was the owner of Sublette Electric.

== Political history ==
Cooper first entered politics when he was elected to the Kemmerer City Council, starting his time in that body in 1982 and serving until 1988. From 1995 to 2002, Cooper was a county commissioner in Lincoln County, Wyoming. From 2003 to 2005 he served as a member of the Wyoming State House, and from the beginning of 2005 to 2017 he was in the Wyoming State Senate.

== Family ==
Cooper is a Latter-day Saint. He and his wife Julie are the parents of five children.

== Sources ==
- Vote Smart entry on Cooper
