= Wyoming's 34th House of Representatives district =

American legislative district

Wyoming's 34th State House of Representatives district
- Wyoming's 34th House of Representatives district as of 2022
Representative
Pepper Ottman; R–Riverton
- Demographics: 84% White; 4% Hispanic; 5% Native American; 5% Multiracial
- Population (2022): 9,415

Wyoming's 34th House of Representatives district is one of 62 districts in the Wyoming House of Representatives. The district encompasses part of Fremont County. It is represented by Republican Representative Pepper Ottman of Riverton.

In 1992, the state of Wyoming switched from electing state legislators by county to a district-based system.

== List of members representing the district ==
Representative	Party	Term	Note
Frank Philp	Republican	1993 – 2011	Elected in 1992. Re-elected in 1994. Re-elected in 1996. Re-elected in 1998. Re-elected in 2000. Re-elected in 2002. Re-elected in 2004. Re-elected in 2006. Re-elected in 2008.
Rita Campbell	Republican	2011 – 2017	Elected in 2010. Re-elected in 2012. Re-elected in 2014.
Tim Salazar	Republican	2017 – 2021	Elected in 2016. Re-elected in 2018.
Pepper Ottman	Republican	2021 – present	Elected in 2020. Re-elected in 2022. Re-elected in 2024.

== Recent election results ==
=== 2014 ===
House district 34 general election
Party	Candidate	Votes	%
Republican	Rita Campbell (Incumbent)	2,494	96.89%
Write-ins		80	3.10%
Total votes		2,574	100.0%
Invalid or blank votes		536	
Republican hold			

=== 2016 ===
House district 34 general election
Party	Candidate	Votes	%
Republican	Tim Salazar	3,890	98.65%
Write-ins		53	1.34%
Total votes		3,943	100.0%
Invalid or blank votes		618	
Republican hold			

=== 2018 ===
House district 34 general election
Party	Candidate	Votes	%
Republican	Tim Salazar (Incumbent)	3,105	98.79%
Write-ins		38	1.20%
Total votes		3,143	100.0%
Invalid or blank votes		494	
Republican hold			

=== 2020 ===
House district 34 general election
Party	Candidate	Votes	%
Republican	Pepper Ottman	4,070	98.71%
Write-ins		53	1.28%
Total votes		4,123	100.0%
Invalid or blank votes		658	
Republican hold			

=== 2022 ===
House district 34 general election
Party	Candidate	Votes	%
Republican	Pepper Ottman (Incumbent)	3,407	98.83%
Write-ins		40	1.16%
Total votes		3,447	100.0%
Invalid or blank votes		454	
Republican hold			

=== 2024 ===
House district 34 general election
Party	Candidate	Votes	%
Republican	Pepper Ottman (Incumbent)	4,117	97.25%
Write-ins		116	2.74%
Total votes		4,233	100.0%
Invalid or blank votes		678	
Republican hold			

== Historical district boundaries ==
Map	Description	Apportionment Plan	Notes
	Fremont County (part)	1992 Apportionment Plan	
	Fremont County (part)	2002 Apportionment Plan	
	Fremont County (part)	2012 Apportionment Plan	
