= Taft Love =

American politician

Member of the Wyoming Senate from the 6th district
- Incumbent
- Assumed office September 9, 2025
- Preceded by: Darin Smith

Personal details
- Born: Charleston, South Carolina, U.S.
- Party: Republican
- Education: Laramie County Community College; University of Wyoming (BS)

Taft C. Love (born 1974 or 1975) is an American politician, serving as a Republican member of the Wyoming Senate, representing the 6th district.

== Biography ==
Love was born in 1974 or 1975 in Charleston, South Carolina. Love studied at Laramie County Community College and earned a bachelor's degree in mathematics and science from the University of Wyoming. Love previously worked for the Wyoming Game and Fish Department as a biologist. Love is a rancher and business owner. Love is married to Jill. The couple has three children.

Love was appointed to the board of trustees of Laramie County School District Number 2 in May 2014 following a vacancy. He was re-elected to the school board in 2014 and 2018. By May 2024, Love was serving as chair of the Laramie County Republican Party Executive Committee. Love unsuccessfully ran for Laramie County commissioner in the 2020 Republican primary. Love unsuccessfully ran in the 2024 Republican primary for the Wyoming Senate seat representing the 6th district. The state senate seat became vacant after the resignation of Darin Smith in August 2025. Love was selected unanimously from three candidates as Smith's successor by the county commissioners of Laramie and Platte counties. He was sworn in on September 9.

Love won the 2026 Republican primary in August to keep his state Senate seat. There were no other candidates filed to compete in the general election.
