= Fred Baldwin =

American politician

Member of the Wyoming Senate from the 14th district
- In office January 10, 2017 – January 6, 2025
- Preceded by: Stan Cooper
- Succeeded by: Laura Taliaferro Pearson

Member of the Wyoming House of Representatives from the 18th district
- In office January 5, 2015 – January 10, 2017
- Preceded by: Kathy Davison
- Succeeded by: Thomas Crank

Personal details
- Born: Afton, Wyoming, U.S.
- Party: Republican
- Spouse: Parry Baldwin
- Children: 5
- Education: Casper College; University of Utah
- Profession: Physician assistant

Fred Baldwin is an American politician and a Republican member of the Wyoming Senate representing District 14 since January 10, 2017.

== Elections ==
=== 2014 ===
After incumbent Republican Representative Kathy Davison announced her retirement, Baldwin announced his candidacy. He defeated Lyle Williams in the Republican primary with 70% of the vote. Baldwin faced Democratic candidate Michele Irwin in the general election and defeated Irwin, 76% to 24%.

=== 2016 ===
State Senator Stan Cooper announced he would not run for re-election in May 2016. Baldwin announced his candidacy shortly thereafter, and defeated Republican Don Lamborn in the August primary. Baldwin defeated Democratic candidate Charlotte Sedey in the general election with 85% of the vote.
