= Tim Salazar =

American politician

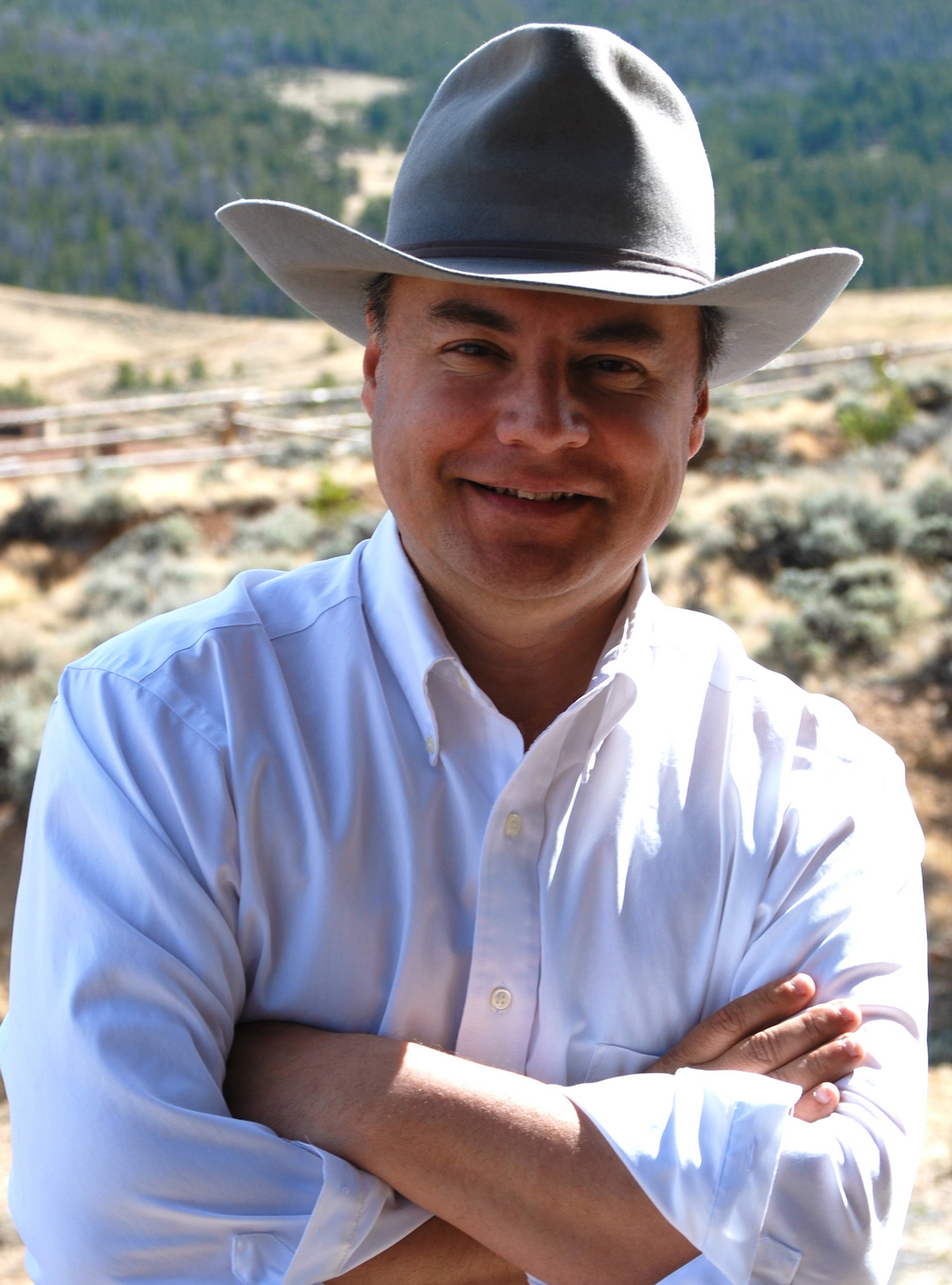

Vice President of the Wyoming Senate
- Incumbent
- Assumed office January 14, 2025
- Preceded by: Dave Kinskey

Member of the Wyoming Senate from the 26th district
- Incumbent
- Assumed office January 12, 2021
- Preceded by: Eli Bebout

Member of the Wyoming House of Representatives from the 34th district
- In office January 10, 2017 – January 12, 2021
- Preceded by: Rita Campbell
- Succeeded by: Pepper Ottman

Personal details
- Party: Republican
- Spouse: Shannon (m. 2001)
- Children: 2

Military service
- Allegiance: United States
- Branch/service: United States Army
- Years of service: 1989–2015
- Unit: United States Army Reserve • Infantry Branch
- Awards: Meritorious Service Medal; Army Commendation Medal; Army Achievement Medal; Army Reserve Components Achievement Medal; National Defense Service Medal; Global War on Terrorism Service Medal; Armed Forces Reserve Medal

Tim Salazar is an American politician and former US Army Officer. He is the Wyoming State Senator for the 26th district. He was sworn into the Wyoming Senate on January 12, 2021. A member of the Republican Party, Salazar previously served as a Representative from the 34th district in the Wyoming House of Representatives from 2017 to 2021. He currently sits on the Senate Appropriations Committee, Senate Education Committee and the WY Department of Homeland Security, State Emergency Response Commission (SERC).

== Wyoming State Senate (2021–present) ==
=== Legislation ===
In 2021 Salazar brought SF 132 which sought to study emergency preparedness in the event of a disruption of federal government operations. The study sought to evaluate the impacts on Wyoming and the potential effects of a major disruption in food distribution or a rapid decline of the United States dollar with possible contingency recommendations to the state. In 2022 Salazar introduced SF 69 which would have limited the increase of property taxes in any one year by not more than five percent from the prior year.

=== Committee assignments ===
Senate Appropriations Committee

Senate Education Committee

Senate Travel, Recreation, Wildlife & Cultural Resources

Select Committee on Tribal Relations

State Emergency Response Commission (SERC), Wyoming Office Of Homeland Security

== Wyoming House of Representatives (2017–2021) ==
=== Legislation ===
In 2017-2018 Salazar authored or co-sponsored over 20 Bills & resolutions including:

- HB.270, a bill providing compensation to Ranchers & Farmers whose livestock is damaged or killed by wolves who crossover from compensation areas to non-compensation areas.
- HB.129, a bill expanding the Food Freedom Act, giving homemade food producers more liberty to sell food and beverages without state interference, exempt from state licensure packaging.
- HB.207, a bill requiring verification of legal presence in the United States before receiving any state public benefits.
- HB.228, a bill establishing tax credit education accounts allowing for tax credits for parents who wish to send their children to private or religious schools.
- HB.137, a bill allowing a person with a valid concealed weapon permit to carry a concealed weapon at any meeting a government entity holds on public property.
- HB.182, a bill requiring a physician performing an abortion or designees to inform patients of the opportunity to view an active ultrasound image & hear the fetal heartbeat.
- HB.168, a bill expanding the Castle Doctrine of no retreat in self-defense using force, anywhere legally able to be, without criminal or civil liability.
- HJ.07, a resolution providing for a Taxpayers Bill of Rights in the Wyoming Constitution, restricting any tax increases without voter approval.
- HJ.06, a resolution proposing term limits on the Wyoming State Legislature.

=== Committee assignments ===
House Judiciary Committee

State Emergency Response Commission (SERC), Wyoming Office Of Homeland Security

== Political positions ==
=== Domestic issues ===
Salazar is a fierce opponent of tax increases. In 2016, he repeatedly adhered to no tax increase pledges and advocated state legislative restraint on government spending. In 2017, he consistently voted against any state fee increases, internet tax or sales and property tax increases in Wyoming.

Salazar is a gun-rights supporter who in 2017 co-sponsored legislation expanding the use of concealed carry in Wyoming. He has voiced his support for self-defense and the Castle Doctrine.

In 2018 Salazar authored and passed into law HB168 Stand Your Ground Law legislation, which provides criminal and civil immunity under the Castle Doctrine for those claiming self defense outside their dwelling.

Salazar is a supporter of school choice and opposes the Common Core State Standards Initiative.

On abortion, Salazar is strongly opposed to abortion care for women. In 2017, he supported expansion of prenatal care for low income women in Wyoming.

Salazar has been an advocate for the US military but has argued for more unconventional smaller forces in any future Counter-terrorism conflicts.

As a member of the House Judiciary Committee he has voted in favor of stronger penalties against domestic violence & child abuse. In 2019 Salazar authored HB 227 which would create the child sexual abuse protection division under the Wyoming Attorney General's office.

Salazar received an A+ rating from the National Rifle Association in 2018 and 2020.

=== International issues ===
Salazar is an outspoken supporter of the State of Israel. In 2017, he co-sponsored legislation that would have prohibited Wyoming public state contracts with companies that boycott the State of Israel.

== Electoral history ==
=== 2014 ===
Salazar challenged incumbent Representative Rita Campbell in the Republican primary. Campbell defeated Salazar and two other opponents with 42% of the vote.

Wyoming House of Representatives, District 34 Republican Primary, 2014
Party	Candidate	Votes	%
Republican	Rita Campbell (incumbent)	892	42.4%
Republican	Tim Salazar	678	32.2%
Republican	Pat Moore	420	20.0%
Republican	Frank Lajeunesse	114	5.4%
Total votes		2,104	100.0%

=== 2016 ===
When Campbell announced her retirement, Salazar again declared his candidacy for the seat. Salazar defeated Taylor Engum in the Republican primary with 57% of the vote and ran unopposed in the general election.

Wyoming House of Representatives, District 34 Republican Primary, 2016
Party	Candidate	Votes	%
Republican	Tim Salazar	1,050	56.5%
Republican	Taylor Engum	808	43.4%
Total votes		1,858	100.0%

=== 2018 ===
Salazar was unopposed in the Republican primary and the general election in 2018 for House District 34.

Wyoming House of Representatives, District 34 Republican Primary, 2018
Party	Candidate	Votes	%
Republican	Tim Salazar (incumbent)	1,936	100.0%
Total votes		1,936	100.0%

Wyoming House of Representatives, District 34
Party	Candidate	Votes	%
Republican	Tim Salazar (incumbent)	3,105	98.8%
Write-in		38	1.2%
Total votes		3,143	100.0%
Republican hold			

=== 2020 ===
Salazar (Republican Party) ran for election to the Wyoming State Senate to represent District 26. Salazar won the Republican primary and the general election in 2020 for Senate District 26.

Republican primary for Wyoming State Senate, District 26
Party	Candidate	Votes	%
Republican	Tim Salazar	2,883	62.3%
Republican	Michael Bailey	1,738	37.6%
Write-in		3	0.1%
Total votes		4,624	100.0%

Wyoming's 26th State Senate District General Election, 2020
Party	Candidate	Votes	%
Republican	Tim Salazar	7,790	100.0%
Total votes		7,790	100.0%
Republican hold			

Wyoming Senate
Preceded by Dave Kinskey	Vice President of the Wyoming Senate; 2025–present	Incumbent
