= Anthony Bouchard =

American politician

Member of the Wyoming Senate from the 6th district
- In office January 10, 2017 – January 6, 2025
- Preceded by: Wayne Johnson
- Succeeded by: Darin Smith

Personal details
- Party: Republican
- Spouse: Billie Jean
- Children: 4
- Website: http://senbouchard.com/

Anthony Bouchard is an American politician who served as a member of the Wyoming Senate from the 6th district from 2017 to 2025, as a member of the Republican Party. Bouchard was previously a candidate in the 2022 United States House of Representatives election in Wyoming.

== Education ==
Bouchard attended the Florida State College at Jacksonville.

== Career ==
Prior to entering politics, Bouchard was a businessman, automotive technician, and welder. He later worked as an automotive business management consultant. Since 2017, Bouchard has also worked as a real estate agent. He and his wife own and operate a septic-draining business.

=== Lobbying ===
Bouchard spent several years as a lobbyist for Wyoming Gun Owners, a group he founded.

In 2010, Bouchard led an effort to oppose receiving $1 million of federal money to protect against large increases to health insurance premiums. Bouchard said that accepting the money would have undermined Wyoming's ability to fight the Patient Protection and Affordable Care Act in court.

=== Wyoming Senate ===
Bouchard unsuccessfully sought the Republican nomination for a seat in the Wyoming Senate in 2012 and a seat in the Wyoming House of Representatives in 2014.

When incumbent State Senator Wayne Johnson announced his retirement in 2016, Bouchard announced his candidacy for the seat. Bouchard ran against State Representative David Zwonitzer and Laramie County Conversation District Supervisor Lindi Kirkbride in the Republican primary. Bouchard defeated Zwonitzer by five votes to become the Republican nominee, with Kirkbride running a close third. He defeated independent candidate Kym Zwonitzer, the wife of David Zwonitzer, in the general election with 52% of the vote.

In the state Senate, Bouchard voted against proposals to expand Medicaid to cover more uninsured Wyomingites. Bouchard is a proponent of capital punishment, opposing a proposal in 2019 to abolish the death penalty in Wyoming.

In 2017, Bouchard supported a bill to allow people to carry guns into government meetings; the bill was vetoed by Governor Matt Mead.

In March 2018, Bouchard introduced a bill to the Wyoming Senate to allow a person to use deadly force in order to protect themselves without requiring the person to retreat from the perpetrator and, in the case of a person who shoots an intruder to their home, assumes that the person acted in self-defense. The bill passed into law. Later that year, a man shot a man nine times with an AR-15 at the entrance of his home. A district court judge dismissed the first-degree murder case against the man, and the Wyoming Supreme Court upheld the dismissal.

In 2021, Bouchard shared a meme on Facebook calling for the execution of US National Institute of Allergy and Infectious Diseases director Anthony Fauci.

In 2024, Bouchard chose not to seek re-election, he was succeeded by Darin Smith.

=== 2022 U.S. House of Representatives campaign ===
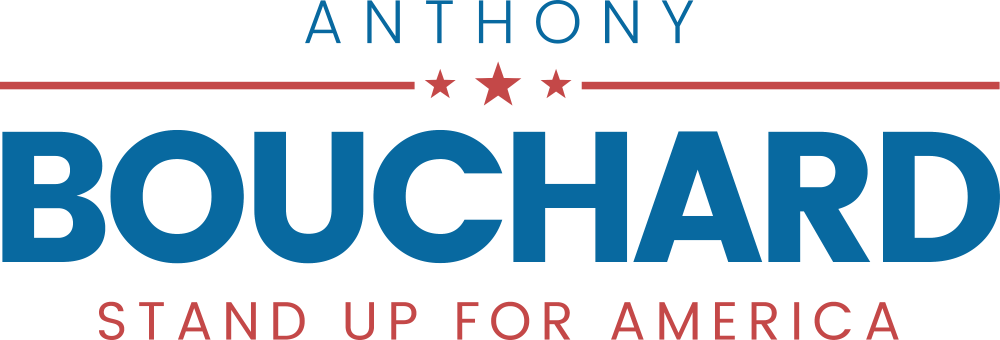
Bouchard's congressional campaign logo

In January 2021, Bouchard announced that he would challenge incumbent U.S. Representative Liz Cheney in the 2022 Republican primary. Cheney, who had been serving in Congress since 2017, was criticized by fellow Republicans, including Bouchard, for her vote in favor of impeaching President Trump because of his actions leading up to the January 6 United States Capitol attack. Bouchard accused Cheney of being "out of touch," and added that Wyoming needed a Representative who would "stand up to Nancy Pelosi and the Democrats." In March 2021, Bouchard voted in favor of a bill, endorsed by Donald Trump Jr., that would have required candidates to win a majority of votes in primary elections to avoid a runoff election; the bill, which would have undermined Cheney's reelection campaign, failed on a 15–14 vote. Bouchard has stated that he has raised over $500,000 in his campaign against Cheney. He finished third in the primary.

== Personal life ==
In May 2021, Bouchard claimed he was pre-empting a media exposé by telling his supporters on a Facebook Live video that, when he was a teenager, he impregnated a girl who was "a little younger than me" in Florida "more than 40 years ago." He later told the Casper Star-Tribune that he was 18 years old and the girl was 14 when she became pregnant. Bouchard said they married when he was 19 and the girl was 15, and the girl eventually gave birth to their son. He said the couple divorced after three years of marriage; she died by suicide in 1990 at age 20.
