= Rich Cathcart =

American politician (born 1946)

Member of the Wyoming Senate from the 6th district
- In office January 12, 1993 – May 17, 2004
- Succeeded by: Jana H. Ginter

Personal details
- Born: April 23, 1946 (age 80) Cheyenne, Wyoming
- Party: Democratic

Rich Cathcart (born April 23, 1946) is an American politician who served in the Wyoming Senate from the 6th district from 1993 to his resignation in 2004.
