= Harriet Elizabeth Byrd =

American politician (1926–2015)

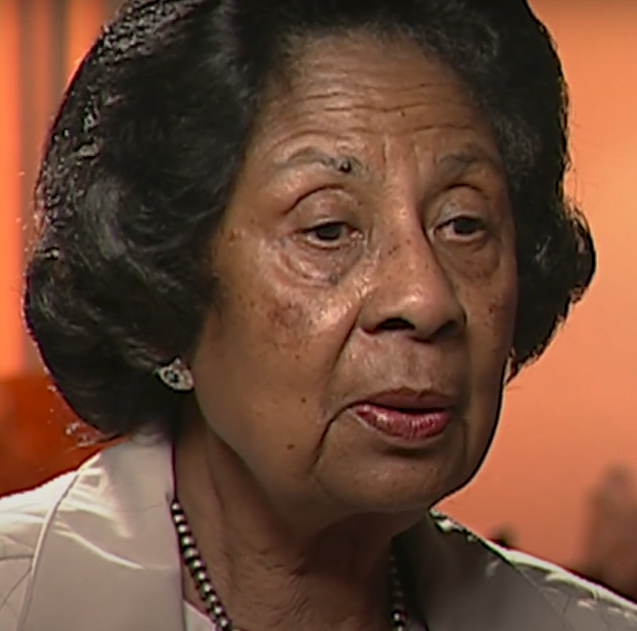

Member of the Wyoming Senate from the Laramie County district
- In office 1989 – January 14, 1993
- Preceded by: Multi-member district
- Succeeded by: Cynthia Lummis

Member of the Wyoming House of Representatives from the Laramie County district
- In office 1981–1989
- Preceded by: Multi-member district
- Succeeded by: Multi-member district

Personal details
- Born: Harriet Elizabeth Rhone; April 20, 1926 Cheyenne, Wyoming, U.S.
- Died: January 27, 2015 (aged 88) Cheyenne, Wyoming, U.S.
- Party: Democratic
- Spouse: James W. Byrd (m. 1947; died 2005)
- Children: 3, including James W. Byrd
- Education: West Virginia State College (BA); University of Wyoming (MA)

Harriet Elizabeth Byrd (April 20, 1926 – January 27, 2015) was an American politician and educator from Wyoming who was the first African-American elected to the Wyoming Legislature.

== Early life ==
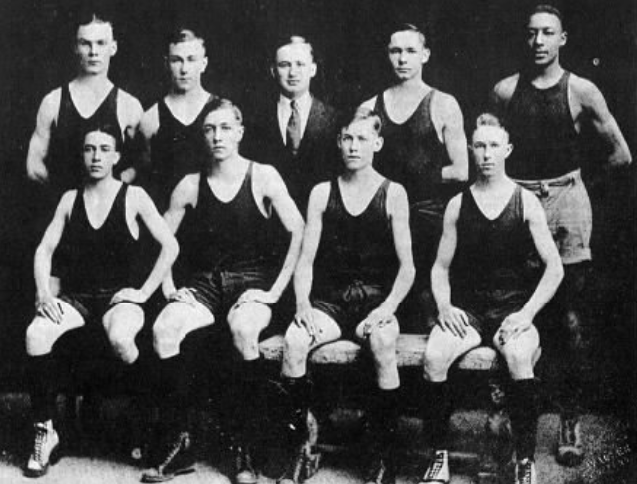
Byrd's father Robert C. Rhone as a member of a basketball team in high school in 1922.

Harriet Elizabeth Rhone was born in Cheyenne, Wyoming, on April 20, 1926, to Robert C. Rhone and Sudie Smith Rhone. Her grandfather, Charles J. Rhone, came to Wyoming in 1876. She graduated from Cheyenne High School in 1944. She graduated from West Virginia State University with a bachelor of arts in education in 1949, and the University of Wyoming with a master of arts in education in 1976.

Byrd applied to teach at the Laramie County School District, but was rejected due to her being black. She worked as a teacher at the Francis E. Warren Air Force Base for ten years. She was hired by the Laramie County School District in 1959, and taught for twenty-seven years. She was the first fully certified full-time black teacher in Wyoming. Byrd was a member of the Wyoming State Advisory Council for Title III for seven years and chair of the Cheyenne Civic Center Advisory Board.

In 1946, Byrd met James Byrd at the Francis E. Warren Air Force Base while attempting to buy drinks. She married James Byrd, with whom she had three children. James was an U.S. Marshal and chief of police in Cheyenne, the first black person to hold that title, under five mayors. Her son, James W. Byrd, served in the Wyoming House of Representatives from the same district she served from 2009 to 2019.

== Career ==
Byrd was elected to the state house to represent Laramie County in 1980, becoming the first black woman to serve in the Wyoming state legislature. She served in the state house for eight years before being elected to the Wyoming Senate.

In 1988, Byrd and James Applegate won the Democratic nomination for the two senate seats from Laramie while incumbent Alvin Wiederspahn lost. She spent $1,094 during the primary campaign. She was redistricted to the 5th district and lost reelection to Republican nominee Cynthia Lummis in the 1992 election. Byrd raised and spent $1,691 in the primary and $8,187 in the general election against the $10,662 spent by Lummis.

During her tenure in the state house she was a member of the Transportation and Highways, and the Education, Health and Welfare committees. During her tenure in the state senate she served on the Education committee. In 1987, she tied with Lauris Tysdal and placed behind Dan S. Budd for worst state legislator in the 49th session. She supported Jesse Jackson during the 1988 Democratic presidential primaries and attended the 1992 Democratic National Convention as an uncommitted delegate.

Chuck Graves, the chair of the Wyoming Democratic Party, talked to Byrd about running for a seat in the United States Senate in the 1990 election against incumbent Republican Senator Alan Simpson.

== Later life ==
Byrd retired from teaching in 1997. Her husband died in 2005, and she died in Cheyenne on January 27, 2015.

== Political positions ==
Byrd was endorsed by the AFL-CIO in the 1980, 1984, and 1988 elections. She called for the creation of a holiday in honor of Martin Luther King Jr. at the state level. In 1987, Byrd and state senator Dick Schmidt proposed legislation to place a referendum for the creation of a statewide lottery system onto the ballot.

== Electoral history ==
1986 Wyoming House of Representatives Laramie County election
Party	Candidate	Votes	%	±%
Democratic	Harriet Elizabeth Byrd (incumbent)	14,985	8.39%	
Democratic	Lynn Birleffi	13,849	7.75%	
Republican	Cynthia Lummis (incumbent)	12,519	7.01%	
Democratic	Guy Cameron	12,416	6.95%	
Democratic	Steve Freudenthal	12,103	6.78%	
Democratic	Shirley Humphrey	11,817	6.62%	
Democratic	Mary Kay Schwope	11,243	6.29%	
Republican	Bill McIlvain (incumbent)	10,874	6.09%	
Republican	Ellen Crowley	10,710	6.00%	
Republican	Gary Yordy	10,619	5.95%	
Republican	April Brimmer Kunz	10,604	5.94%	
Democratic	Robert Larson	8,386	4.70%	
Democratic	Carolyn G. Johnson	7,959	4.46%	
Democratic	Charles A. Hunter	6,806	3.81%	
Republican	Ben Zavorka	6,522	3.65%	
Republican	Lou Mandis	5,969	3.34%	
Republican	Ron G. Pretty	5,752	3.22%	
Republican	Mary Jean McDowell Baker	5,475	3.07%	
Total votes		178,608	100.00%	

1992 Wyoming Senate 5th district election
Party	Candidate	Votes	%	±%
Republican	Cynthia Lummis	3,434	52.86%	
Democratic	Harriet Elizabeth Byrd (incumbent)	3,062	47.14%	
Total votes		6,496	100.00%	
