= Cynthia Lummis =

American politician (born 1954)

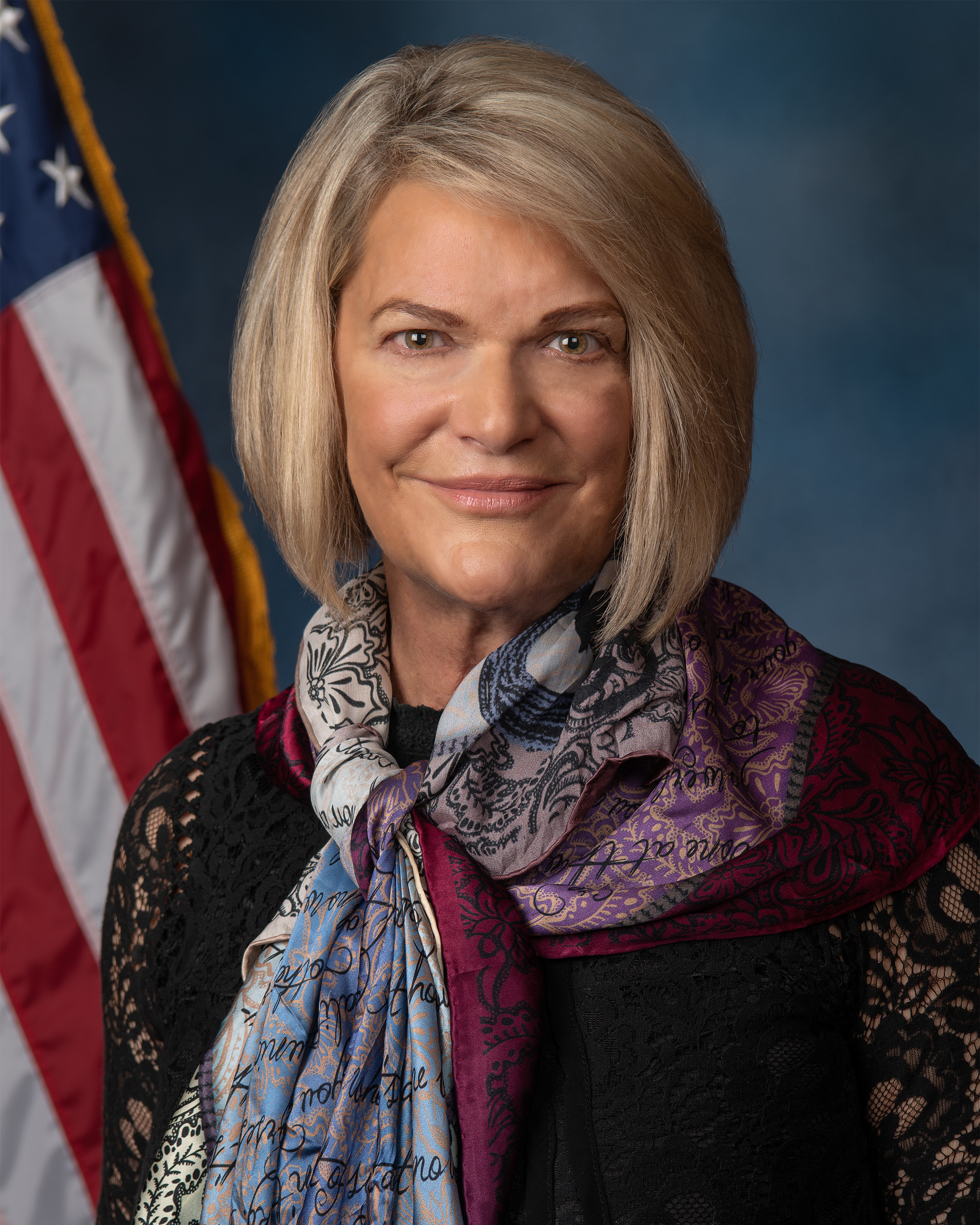
- Official portrait, 2020

United States Senator from Wyoming
- Incumbent
- Assumed office January 3, 2021 Serving with John Barrasso
- Preceded by: Mike Enzi

Member of the U.S. House of Representatives from Wyoming's at-large district
- In office January 3, 2009 – January 3, 2017
- Preceded by: Barbara Cubin
- Succeeded by: Liz Cheney

27th Treasurer of Wyoming
- In office January 4, 1999 – January 9, 2007
- Governor: Jim Geringer; Dave Freudenthal
- Preceded by: Stan Smith
- Succeeded by: Joseph Meyer

Member of the Wyoming Senate from the 5th district
- In office January 14, 1993 – January 10, 1995
- Preceded by: Harriet Elizabeth Byrd
- Succeeded by: Don Lawler

Member of the Wyoming House of Representatives from the Laramie County district
- In office January 7, 1985 – January 14, 1993
- In office January 8, 1979 – January 3, 1983
- Preceded by: Multi-member district
- Succeeded by: Constituency abolished

Personal details
- Born: Cynthia Marie Lummis; September 10, 1954 (age 72) Cheyenne, Wyoming, U.S.
- Party: Republican
- Spouse: Alvin Wiederspahn (m. 1983; died 2014)
- Children: 1
- Education: University of Wyoming (BS, JD)
- Website: Senate Website; Campaign website
- Lummis's voice Lummis supporting the Respect for Marriage Act. Recorded November 29, 2022

Cynthia Marie Lummis Wiederspahn (/ˈlʌmɪs/ LUH-miss; born September 10, 1954) is an American attorney and politician serving as the junior United States senator from Wyoming since 2021. A member of the Republican Party, Lummis served as the U.S. representative for Wyoming's at-large congressional district from 2009 to 2017. She served in the Wyoming House of Representatives from 1979 to 1983 and from 1985 to 1993, in the Wyoming Senate from 1993 to 1995, and as the Wyoming State Treasurer from 1999 to 2007.

Lummis was elected treasurer of Wyoming in 1998 and reelected without opposition in 2002. She managed the gubernatorial campaigns of Mary Mead in 1990 and Ray Hunkins in 2006. She also served on Bob Dole's presidential steering committee in Wyoming and chaired Mitt Romney's 2012 presidential campaign in Wyoming.

Lummis unsuccessfully sought to be appointed to replace Senator Craig L. Thomas in 2007. She was elected to succeed Barbara Cubin in the U.S. House of Representatives in the 2008 election, defeating Democratic nominee Gary Trauner. During her tenure in the House, she was the first Wyoming representative to serve on the Agriculture Committee since 1941, chaired the Science Subcommittee on Energy, co-chaired the Congressional Caucus for Women's Issues, and was active in the Congressional Western Caucus and Freedom Caucus. She served until her retirement in 2017, and was succeeded by Liz Cheney.

After Lummis's tenure in the House, she sought a position in President Donald Trump's cabinet as secretary of the interior, but was not appointed. She was elected to the U.S. Senate in the 2020 election, becoming the first woman to represent Wyoming in the Senate. In the U.S. Senate, she supported efforts to overturn the results of the 2020 presidential election and promoted cryptocurrency.

== Early life and education ==
Cynthia Marie Lummis was born on September 10, 1954, in Cheyenne, Wyoming, to Doran Lummis and Enid Bennett. She is descended from German immigrants; her family first came to Wyoming in 1868. Her father chaired the Laramie County Republican Party and served on the county board of commissioners. Her brother Del Lummis also chaired the Laramie County Republican Party.

Lummis attended Cheyenne East High School, and graduated from the University of Wyoming with a Bachelor of Science degree in animal science in 1976 and a Bachelor of Science in biology in 1978. She graduated from the University of Wyoming with a Juris Doctor in 1985, and was on the dean's list. She worked as a student teacher at Rock River School in 1977.

== Career ==
=== State legislature ===
==== Elections ====
In 1978, Lummis was elected to the Wyoming House of Representatives at age 24, the youngest woman to serve in the state legislature. She was reelected in 1980, but chose to not seek reelection in 1982. Lummis returned to the state house after winning the 1984 election. She filed to run for reelection on June 19, 1986, and was reelected after placing third out of 18 candidates. She was reelected in the 1988 and 1990 elections. She was reapportioned to the 8th district in 1992.

In 1990, when Republican Senator Dan Sullivan resigned from the Wyoming Senate, Senate Majority Leader Diemer True stated that Lummis was qualified to replace Sullivan in the state senate. But she could not take the position, as she was busy serving as a campaign manager in the gubernatorial election. In 1992, Lummis ran for a seat in the Wyoming Senate from the 5th district, defeating Norman P. Feagler for the Republican nomination, and incumbent Democratic Senator Harriet Elizabeth Byrd in the general election. During the campaign Lummis spent $11,661, making her the fifth-highest spending elected candidate in the 1992 election. On June 8, 1994, she announced that she would not run for reelection, saying she had other commitments to her family. Republican nominee Don Lawler was elected to succeed her, defeating Democratic nominee Steve Freudenthal.

==== Tenure ====
During Lummis's tenure in the state house, she chaired the Revenue committee and served on the Judiciary and Agriculture Committees. During her tenure in the state senate she served on the Judiciary Committee. After leaving the state legislature, she was appointed to Jim Geringer's gubernatorial transition team, and served as his general counsel until 1997. Geringer appointed Lummis to serve as interim director of the Office of State Lands and Investments in 1997, after he fired Jim Magagna.

On February 28, 1982, Lummis was injured in a car accident while her husband was driving. She attended the National Conference of State Legislatures national conference in 1982, alongside Senate President Donald Cundall and Representatives Wiederspahn, Peg Shreve, Scott Ratliff, William A. Cross, and George Salisbury. In a 1982 roll-call vote in favor of legislation about the treatment of non-resident traffic offenders, a man cast Lummis's vote while she was outside the room. Lummis changed the vote to a nay after coming back in. Representative Ken Burns said the incident showed why electronic voting was needed.

During the 1988 Republican presidential primaries, Lummis served on Bob Dole's steering committee in Wyoming. A 1989 survey of the financial contributors of the Wyoming Republican Party showed that Lummis was suggested as a candidate for Secretary of State of Wyoming. She served as Republican candidate Mary Mead's campaign manager during the 1990 gubernatorial election.

=== Treasurer ===
==== Elections ====
Results of the 1998 Wyoming Treasurer election Lummis: Lummis—50–60% Lummis—60–70% Lummis—70–80% Loveridge: Loveridge—50–60%

On November 17, 1996, incumbent Treasurer Stan Smith announced that he would not seek reelection to a fifth term in 1998. It was speculated that Lummis would replace him. At the Laramie County Republican convention on March 28, 1998, she announced that she would run for treasurer, and formally announced her campaign on April 20, at a press conference alongside Smith.

During the campaign, the Attorney General ruled that public funds could not be used to send state treasurer candidates to an investment seminar. Lummis won the Republican nomination without opposition and defeated Democratic nominee Charyl Loveridge and Libertarian nominee James Blomquist.

Lummis was considered as a possible candidate for the Republican nomination in the 2002 gubernatorial election, but declined to run. She announced on April 30 that she would seek reelection as treasurer, and was reelected without opposition in 2002. Lummis was the only statewide candidate to face no opposition in the 2002 election, as nobody had filed to run in the Democratic primary and no other candidate received the 25 write-in votes required to qualify for the nomination. During the campaign she had raised $9,275 and spent $12,151.

She was limited to two terms as treasurer and did not challenge the constitutionality of the legislation, despite the Wyoming Supreme Court having invalidated term limits on state legislators. She endorsed former Speaker Fred Parady to succeed her as treasurer in the 2006 election, but Joseph Meyer won the Republican primary and the general election.

==== Tenure ====
Lummis conducted an accounting change by raising the interest rate on the $100 million in Wyoming banks, which reduced Wyoming's expected budget deficit in 1999 by over $5 million. She also planned a 1% increase on the interest yield of Wyoming's $2.6 billion permanent fund, which would raise $26 million per year. She served on the Wyoming Board of Land Commissioners alongside Governor Geringer, Secretary of State Meyer, Auditor Max Maxfield, and superintendent of public instruction Judy Catchpole. During her tenure, the Permanent Mineral Trust Fund rose to over $2 billion for the first time.

In April 2001, Lummis announced a conflict of interest involving her role as treasurer of the Arp and Hammond Hardware Company, which she claimed had existed since December 2000. A different document indicated that it had actually existed since April 2000, but Lummis insisted that the second form was in error. She and other Republican statewide officials were accused of trying to expand their powers at the expense of Governor Dave Freudenthal, but denied the claims. Lummis claimed that she was the person responsible for the increase in Wyoming's investments during her tenure as treasurer, but Freudenthal said that no one person could take credit for the increase.

As a member of the Wyoming Canvassing Board, Lummis voted unanimously alongside the three other members against a recall of the ballots cast in Natrona County during the 2002 United States House of Representatives election. Even though the results in Natrona County could not overturn the statewide results, they would determine which county was placed first on the ballot. Lummis initially supported a recount, but changed her mind after Mary Ann Collins, the Natrona County Clerk, told her that all of the ballots had been counted.

Lummis and all other statewide officials in Wyoming attended the first inauguration of George W. Bush. During the 2004 presidential election, she served as one of Wyoming's 28 delegates to the Republican National Convention. Lummis was the only statewide official from Wyoming to attend Bush's second inauguration. She served as the chair of Ray Hunkins's campaign during the 2006 gubernatorial election.

=== United States House of Representatives ===
==== Elections ====
Results of the 2008 United States House of Representatives election in Wyoming Lummis: Lummis—50–60% Lummis—60–70% Lummis—70–80% Trauner: Trauner—40–50% Trauner—50–60% Trauner—60–70%

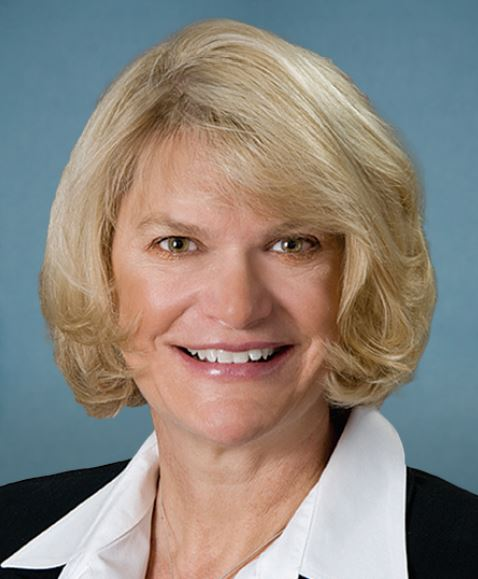
Cynthia Lummis in 2009

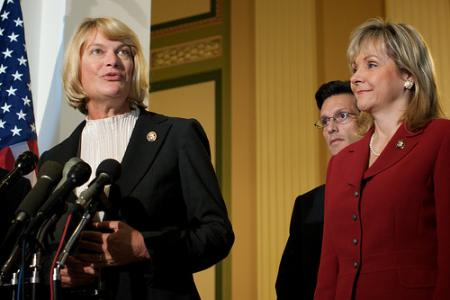
Cynthia Lummis with representatives Eric Cantor and Mary Fallin

Representative Barbara Cubin, whom Lummis had supported during the 1994 election, announced that she would not run for reelection in the 2008 election. On January 2, 2008, Lummis announced that she would run for Cubin's seat, winning the Republican nomination against Mark Gordon, Bill Winney, and Michael Holland, having challenged them to debates held in all 23 Wyoming counties during the primaries. A poll conducted from January 18 to 21 showed that Lummis had a favorability rating of 29%, an unfavorability rating of 17%, and a neutral rating of 24%; 30% did not recognize her. Tucker Fagan, who later served as her chief of staff, served as Lummis's campaign manager. During the campaign Rachael Seidenschnur, her press secretary, resigned after using a fake name to ask Lummis's opponent a question. She defeated Democratic nominee Gary Trauner in the general election. During the campaign Lummis raised $1,557,313 and spent $1,543,875 while Trauner raised $1,672,707 and spent $1,716,013.

Lummis was reelected in 2010 against Democratic nominee David Wendt and Libertarian nominee John V. Love, after having raised $780,426 and spending $754,270 compared to Wendt, who had raised $65,709 and spent $68,523 On May 12, 2012, Lummis announced that she would run for reelection. She was reelected in the 2012 election over Democratic nominee Chris Henrichsen after having raised $715,314 and spent $631,026. She was reelected in the 2014 election against Democratic nominee Richard Grayson, after having raised $432,666 and spent $300,949.

On November 12, 2015, Lummis announced that she would not seek reelection in the 2016 election. Liz Cheney was elected to succeed her. Lummis's daughter, Annaliese Wiederspahn, served as Leland Christensen's campaign manager during the Republican primary. Lummis considered running for the Republican nomination in the 2018 gubernatorial election, but declined to run, instead endorsing Sam Galeotos. She sought a position in President Donald Trump's cabinet by attempting to replace Ryan Zinke as United States Secretary of the Interior, but David Bernhardt was appointed instead.

==== Tenure ====
During Lummis's tenure in the House, she served on the Agriculture and Appropriations Committees and on the Energy and Mineral Resources, National Parks, Forests and Public Lands, and Energy and Water Development Subcommittees. She was the first representative from Wyoming to serve on the Agriculture Committee since Frank O. Horton, who served on the committee from 1939 to 1941. In 2011, she was appointed vice chair of the Appropriations Subcommittee of the Agriculture Committee. Lummis left the Appropriations Committee in 2013, saying she had requested her removal from the committee and that it was not part of a purge of radical Republicans from committee positions. She was appointed chair of the Science Subcommittee on Energy in 2013.

Lummis served as the communications chair and spokesperson of the Congressional Western Caucus and succeeded Dean Heller as vice chair in 2011 following Heller's appointment to the United States Senate. Lummis was elected to serve on the House Republican Steering Committee in 2010. She was at one point the only female member of the Freedom Caucus and the last until the election of Debbie Lesko. Lummis co-chaired the Congressional Caucus for Women's Issues alongside Representative Gwen Moore from 2011 to 2013. She was also a member of the Tea Party Caucus.

Lummis supported Speaker John Boehner while the Freedom Caucus successfully pushed to remove Boehner. She praised the election of Paul Ryan as Speaker, saying, "we have ushered in thoughtful, conservative leadership, restored member-driven policy-making to the legislative process and returned regular order that will bring sunshine to back rooms making government work better".

Lummis served on the Republican whip team until she was removed from the position in 2015, for voting against giving President Barack Obama the authority to propose a trade agreement with Pacific countries. She said she knew she would be removed from her position on the whip team for her vote but did not regret it. Representatives Steve Pearce and Trent Franks were also removed from the whip team for their votes.

During the 2008 presidential election, Lummis was supposed to give a speech at the Republican National Convention on the first day, but her speech was canceled due to Hurricane Gustav. During the 2012 Republican presidential primaries she endorsed Mitt Romney and served as the chair of Romney's campaign in Wyoming. During the 2016 Republican presidential primaries, she was a campaign surrogate for Rand Paul, and later endorsed Trump in the presidential election.

=== United States Senate ===
==== Elections ====
After U.S. Senator Craig L. Thomas died on June 4, 2007, Lummis announced on June 12 that she would seek an appointment to replace him. She placed third in the final vote, making her one of the nominees submitted to the governor as a candidate for appointment, alongside John Barrasso and Tom Sansonetti. Freudenthal selected Barrasso to replace Thomas. Lummis was speculated as a possible candidate in the 2014 United States Senate election.

On June 20, 2019, Lummis filed to run for a seat in the United States Senate to succeed retiring Senator Mike Enzi. She won the Republican nomination and defeated Democratic nominee Merav Ben-David in the general election. Her victory made her the first woman to represent Wyoming in the United States Senate. She raised more during the campaign than all of her Republican and Democratic opponents combined. During the campaign Lummis raised $3,003,788 and spent $3,037,813 while Ben-David raised $559,626 and spent $545,348.

On December 19, 2025, Lummis announced that she would not run for reelection in 2026.

==== Tenure ====
During her tenure in the Senate, Lummis has served on the Banking, Housing, and Urban Affairs, Environment and Public Works, and Commerce, Science, and Transportation committees. Hans Hunt, a member of the Wyoming state House, resigned so that he could work as Lummis's agriculture and trade policy adviser.

During the counting of the electoral college vote of the 2020 presidential election Lummis voted to certify the results from Arizona, but against certifying the results from Pennsylvania. She voted to acquit Trump during his second impeachment trial.

Lummis voted against the American Rescue Plan Act of 2021 but for the PPP Extension Act and the COVID-19 Hate Crimes Act.

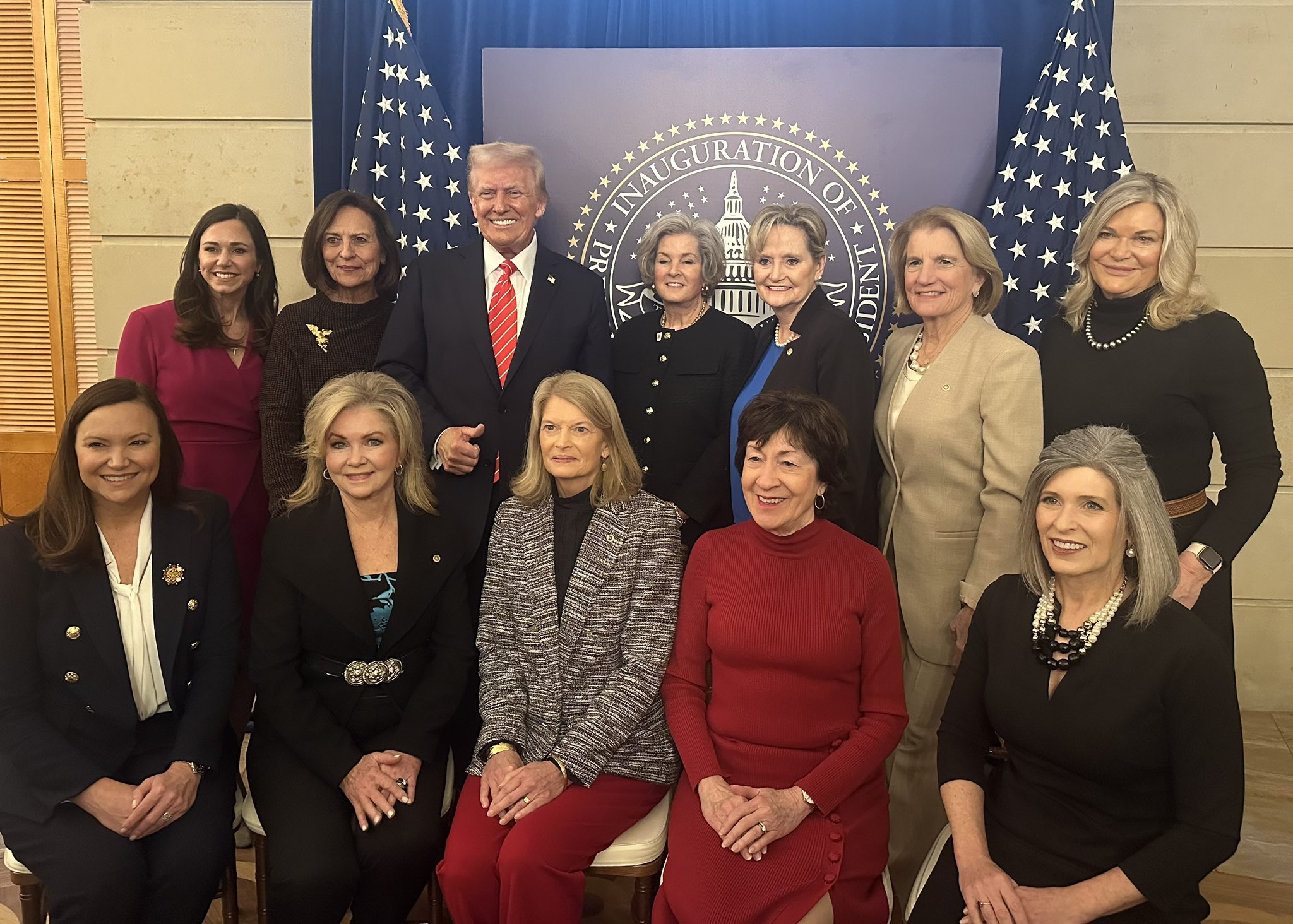
Lummis with President Donald Trump, Susie Wiles, and fellow female Republican senators, January 2025

== Political positions ==
=== Bitcoin ===
Lummis is a strong proponent of Bitcoin and cryptocurrency. In 2022, she and Senator Kirsten Gillibrand introduced bipartisan legislation to reform the tax code to provide a tax exemption for personal Bitcoin or cryptocurrency transactions under $600 from capital gains. This was aimed to make everyday use more practical. Of the bill, Lummis said, "We cannot allow our archaic tax policies to stifle American innovation, and my legislation ensures Americans can participate in the digital economy without inadvertent tax violations." In July 2024, Lummis introduced legislation to create a "strategic Bitcoin reserve", which would entail that the Treasury and the Federal Reserve would buy five percent of the global supply of Bitcoin, which it would subsequently hold.

Lummis purchased Bitcoin in 2013 on her son-in-law's advice and became the first U.S. senator to own cryptocurrency. Her enthusiasm for the technology led to her being known as Congress's "Crypto Queen". Lummis owned at least $230,000 worth of Bitcoin in 2021. In October 2021, CNBC reported that she had violated the Stop Trading on Congressional Knowledge (STOCK) Act of 2012, a federal transparency and conflict-of-interest law, by failing to disclose within 45 days a purchase of Bitcoin she made in August 2021 worth between $50,001 and $100,000.

=== Economy ===
Lummis supported the federal takeover of Fannie Mae and Freddie Mac, but said the government should avoid bailing out private companies. She supported the privatization of Social Security, raising the age at which people received Social Security money, and making the Bush tax cuts permanent. She voted against the American Recovery and Reinvestment Act of 2009.

In 2010, the House voted 228 to 192, with Lummis in favor, to prohibit federal funding for NPR. She said that House Democrats had a "cocaine-like addiction" to spending. Lummis voted against the Hurricane Sandy relief bill, saying that although victims of Hurricane Sandy deserved the money the federal government should cut its budget to offset the cost of the legislation.

Lummis has campaigned for a regulatory framework for digital assets, a stance she reiterated after the FTX exchange collapsed.

=== Energy and climate change ===
In a 2012 campaign debate, Lummis rejected the scientific consensus on climate change, claiming that climate change was "not settled science". She supports the development of nuclear power and oil drilling in Alaska.

=== Equality ===
In 1979, Lummis said that it was "important to me to see Equal Rights Amendment not rescinded". In 2015, she and Representative Carolyn Maloney led another effort to pass the ERA. In 2013, the House voted 286 to 138, with Lummis against, to reauthorize the Violence Against Women Act. She and Senator Chris Van Hollen attempted to have a federal building in Cheyenne named after Louisa Swain, the first woman to vote in the United States.

=== Free speech ===
In 2023, Lummis and Senator Rand Paul cosponsored the Free Speech Protection Act to prohibit the government from directing online platforms to censor speech protected by the First Amendment. Lummis said, "If we let the Biden administration restrict our freedom of speech, there is no telling what other sacred freedoms they will come for next." In September 2025, Lummis defended the indefinite suspension of Jimmy Kimmel Live! in response to pressure from Federal Communications Commission chair Brendan Carr. Carr had suggested ABC's FCC license could be revoked for comments Jimmy Kimmel made about the alleged killer of Charlie Kirk. Lummis said, "an FCC license, it's not a right. It really is a privilege", adding, "Under normal times, in normal circumstances, I tend to think that the First Amendment should always be sort of the ultimate right. And that there should be almost no checks and balances on it. I don't feel that way anymore. I feel like something's changed culturally. And I think that there needs to be some cognizance that things have changed. We just can't let people call each other those kinds of insane things and then be surprised when politicians get shot and the death threats they are receiving and then trying to get extra money for security."

=== LGBT rights ===
Lummis voted against the Matthew Shepard and James Byrd Jr. Hate Crimes Prevention Act, named after Matthew Shepard, a murder victim who was gay, stating that she believed that hate crime legislation was "a state's rights issue". She voted against the repeal of don't ask, don't tell and co-sponsored the State Marriage Defense Act. Following the Supreme Court ruling in Obergefell v. Hodges, which found same-sex marriage bans unconstitutional, Lummis supported the First Amendment Defense Act to protect religious groups that opposed gay marriage. She opposes same-sex marriage and believes that it "should be left to the states". She was given a zero percent rating from the Human Rights Campaign during her entire tenure in the House of Representatives.

Lummis was one of 12 Republicans to vote to advance the Respect for Marriage Act, legislation that codifies same-sex marriage rights into federal law. On November 29, 2022, she voted for the final passage of the act. Explaining her decision, a reversal of her opposition to federal same-sex marriage recognition, she said she was "guided by two things—the Wyoming Constitution and ensuring religious liberties for all citizens and faith-based organizations were protected."

=== Foreign policy ===
Lummis supported continuing the United States' occupation of Iraq, holding that soldiers should not be withdrawn until General David Petraeus said it was time to leave. She supported the surge of soldiers in Iraq. Lummis was one of four Republicans on the Agriculture Committee to vote in favor of legislation that would have lifted the travel ban on Americans and agricultural products to and from Cuba. Lummis opposed American involvement in the Syrian civil war, stating that the civil war "should be dealt with by the Arab world" and that she did not see how "getting involved in another open-ended and costly conflict is in the best interest of America".

=== Firearms ===
Lummis received an "A" rating and endorsement from the NRA Political Victory Fund during the 2008 campaign. In 2009, the House voted 279 to 147, with Lummis in favor, to allow people to bring loaded guns into national parks and wildlife refuges.

=== Health care legislation ===
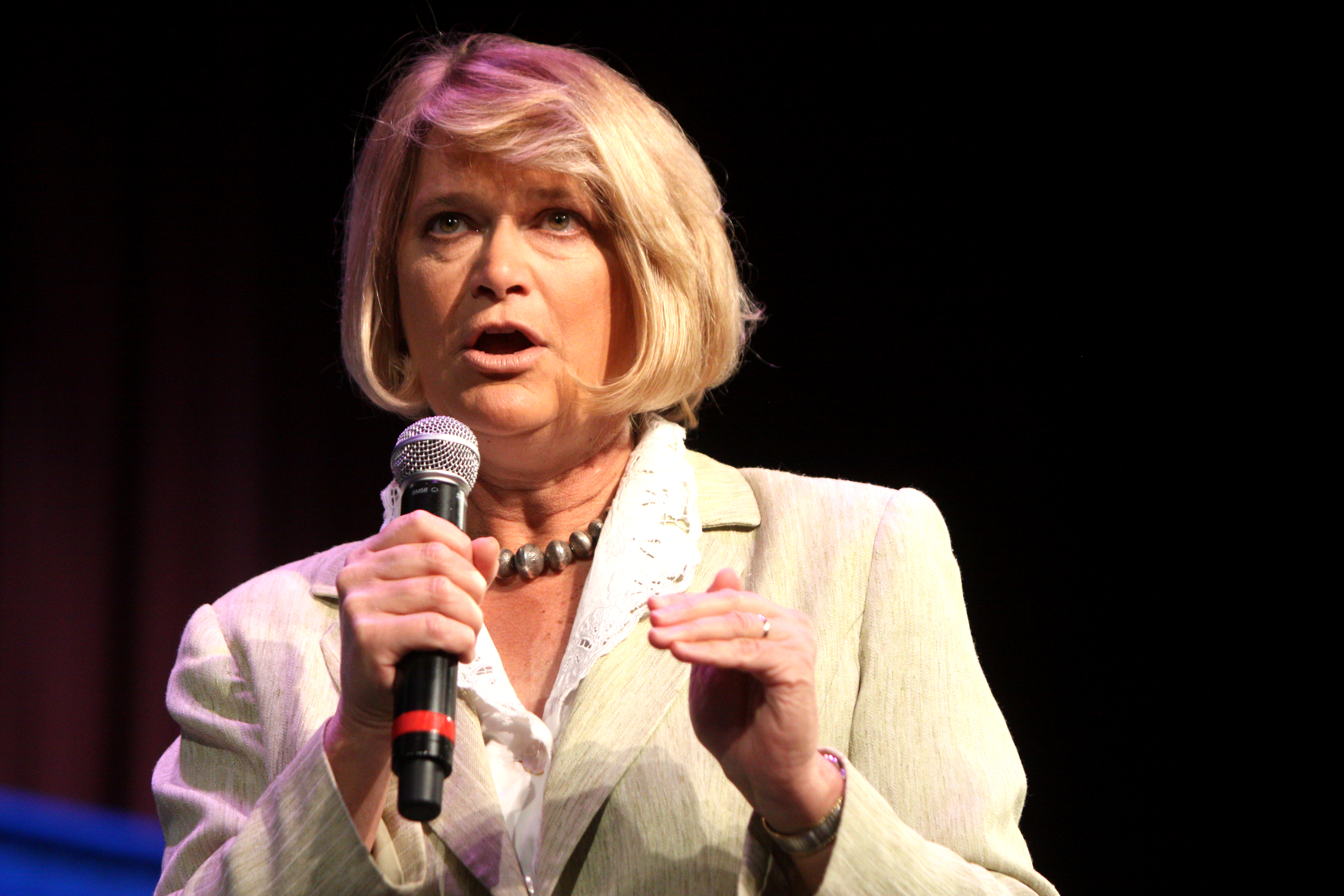
Cynthia Lummis in 2011

Lummis supported the creation of federal legislation to allow private insurance companies to form interstate insurance pools. She voted against passage of the Affordable Care Act (ACA) in 2009, and has supported subsequent efforts to defund the ACA.

Lummis and 182 other Republican members of Congress filed an amicus brief asking the Supreme Court to halt a COVID-19 vaccination mandate for companies with 100 or more employees. During the COVID-19 pandemic, she opposed adding unruly passengers to the "no-fly" list, saying that unruly passengers who refuse to comply with mask requirements are not the same as terrorists.

Lummis co-sponsored legislation in the state house to allow state Medicaid funding to be used for abortions when the mother's life was at risk. The Wyoming "Right to Choose" political action committee reported that Lummis was pro-choice after she completed a questionnaire during the 1990 election and the organization endorsed her during the 1992 election. Lummis said in the 1990s that abortion was a sin, but that it should not be illegal, because people can better evaluate their circumstances than the state.

In 2015, Lummis cosponsored and voted for legislation in the House to defund Planned Parenthood. The National Right to Life Committee endorsed her in the 2020 election and gave her a 100% anti-abortion rating during her tenure in the U.S. House of Representatives. She supported the Pain-Capable Unborn Child Protection Act. Lummis was given a 0% rating by NARAL Pro-Choice America in 2016.

=== Veterans ===
In 2022, Lummis was among the 11 senators who voted against the Honoring our PACT Act of 2022, a bill that funded research and benefits for up to 3.5 million veterans exposed to toxic substances during their service.

== Personal life ==
Lummis met Alvin Wiederspahn while both were campaigning during the 1978 election; they married on May 28, 1983. Both later served in the Wyoming House of Representatives, one of the few married couples to do so, though Lummis is a Republican and Wiederspahn was a Democrat. She remained married to Wiederspahn, with whom she had one child, until his death on October 24, 2014.

Lummis has a net worth of $12.26 million as of 2015, but reported a net worth between $20 million and $75 million from 2007 to 2008. She is a Lutheran and adheres to the Lutheran Church – Missouri Synod (LCMS).

== Electoral history ==
1986 Wyoming House of Representatives Laramie County Republican primary
Party	Candidate	Votes	%
Republican	Cynthia Lummis (incumbent)	6,837	15.54%
Republican	Ellen Crowley	6,521	14.82%
Republican	Bill McIlvain	6,338	14.40%
Republican	April Brimmer Kunz	6,173	14.03%
Republican	Gary Yordy	5,682	12.91%
Republican	Mary Jean McDowell Baker	4,480	10.18%
Republican	Ronald G. Pretty	4,128	9.38%
Republican	Lou Mandis	3,850	8.75%
Total votes		44,009	100.00%

1986 Wyoming House of Representatives Laramie County election
Party	Candidate	Votes	%
Democratic	Harriet Elizabeth Byrd (incumbent)	14,985	8.39%
Democratic	Lynn Birleffi	13,849	7.75%
Republican	Cynthia Lummis (incumbent)	12,519	7.01%
Democratic	Guy Cameron	12,416	6.95%
Democratic	Steve Freudenthal	12,103	6.78%
Democratic	Shirley Humphrey	11,817	6.62%
Democratic	Mary Kay Schwope	11,243	6.29%
Republican	Bill McIlvain (incumbent)	10,874	6.09%
Republican	Ellen Crowley	10,710	6.00%
Republican	Gary Yordy	10,619	5.95%
Republican	April Brimmer Kunz	10,604	5.94%
Democratic	Robert Larson	8,386	4.70%
Democratic	Carolyn G. Johnson	7,959	4.46%
Democratic	Charles A. Hunter	6,806	3.81%
Republican	Ben Zavorka	6,522	3.65%
Republican	Lou Mandis	5,969	3.34%
Republican	Ron G. Pretty	5,752	3.22%
Republican	Mary Jean McDowell Baker	5,475	3.07%
Total votes		178,608	100.00%

1992 Wyoming Senate 5th Republican primary
Party	Candidate	Votes	%
Republican	Cynthia Lummis	1,720	75.64%
Republican	Norman P. Feagler	554	24.36%
Total votes		2,274	100.00%

1992 Wyoming Senate 5th election
Party	Candidate	Votes	%
Republican	Cynthia Lummis	3,434	52.86%
Democratic	Harriet Elizabeth Byrd (incumbent)	3,062	47.14%
Total votes		6,496	100.00%

1998 Wyoming Treasurer election
Party	Candidate	Votes	%
Republican	Cynthia Lummis	105,332	62.69%
Democratic	Charyl Loveridge	52,655	31.34%
Libertarian	James Blomquist	10,024	5.97%
Total votes		168,011	100.00%

2002 Wyoming Treasurer Republican primary
Party	Candidate	Votes	%
Republican	Cynthia Lummis (incumbent)	75,169	100.00%
Total votes		75,169	100.00%

2002 Wyoming Treasurer election
Party	Candidate	Votes	%	±%
Republican	Cynthia Lummis (incumbent)	152,583	100.00%	+37.31%
Total votes		152,583	100.00%	

2007 United States Senate candidate selection final vote
Party	Candidate	Votes	%
Republican	Tom Sansonetti	58	27.23%
Republican	John Barrasso	56	26.29%
Republican	Cynthia Lummis	44	20.66%
Republican	Matt Mead	30	14.08%
Republican	Ron Micheli	25	11.74%
Total votes		213	100.00%

2008 United States House of Representatives at-large congressional district Republican primary
Party	Candidate	Votes	%
Republican	Cynthia Lummis	33,149	46.24%
Republican	Mark Gordon	26,827	37.42%
Republican	Bill Winney	8,537	11.91%
Republican	Michael Holland	3,171	4.42%
Total votes		71,684	100.00%

2008 United States House of Representatives at-large congressional district election
Party	Candidate	Votes	%	±%
Republican	Cynthia Lummis	131,244	52.62%	+4.29%
Democratic	Gary Trauner	106,758	42.81%	−4.99%
Libertarian	W. David Herbert	11,030	4.42%	+0.55%
Write-in		363	0.15%	N/A
Total votes		249,395	100.00%	
	Overvotes	180		
	Undervotes	6,458		

2010 United States House of Representatives at-large congressional district Republican primary
Party	Candidate	Votes	%	±%
Republican	Cynthia Lummis (incumbent)	84,063	82.82%	+36.58%
Republican	Evan Liam Slafter	17,148	16.89%	+16.89%
Write-in		289	0.28%	N/A
Total votes		101,500	100.00%	
	Overvotes	49		
	Undervotes	5,421		

2010 United States House of Representatives at-large congressional district election
Party	Candidate	Votes	%	±%
Republican	Cynthia Lummis (incumbent)	131,661	70.42%	+17.80%
Democratic	David Wendt	45,768	24.48%	−18.33%
Libertarian	John V. Love	9,253	4.95%	+0.53%
Write-in		287	0.15%	+0.00%
Total votes		186,969	100.00%	
	Overvotes	188		
	Undervotes	3,665		

2012 United States House of Representatives at-large congressional district Republican primary
Party	Candidate	Votes	%	±%
Republican	Cynthia Lummis (incumbent)	73,153	98.13%	+15.31%
Write-in		1,393	1.87%	+1.59%
Total votes		74,546	100.00%	
	Overvotes	8		
	Undervotes	9,862		

2012 United States House of Representatives at-large congressional district election
Party	Candidate	Votes	%	±%
Republican	Cynthia Lummis (incumbent)	166,452	68.89%	−1.53%
Democratic	Chris Henrichsen	57,573	23.83%	−0.65%
Libertarian	Richard Brubaker	8,442	3.49%	−1.46%
Constitution	Daniel Clyde Cummings	4,963	2.05%	+2.05%
Wyoming Country	Don Wills	3,775	1.56%	+1.56%
Write-in		416	0.17%	+0.02%
Total votes		241,621	100.00%	
	Overvotes	600		
	Undervotes	8,479		

2014 United States House of Representatives at-large congressional district Republican primary
Party	Candidate	Votes	%	±%
Republican	Cynthia Lummis (incumbent)	70,918	75.89%	−22.24%
Republican	Jason Adam Senteney	22,251	23.81%	+23.81%
Write-in		274	0.29%	-1.58%
Total votes		93,443	100.00%	
	Overvotes	50		
	Undervotes	5,820		

2014 United States House of Representatives at-large congressional district election
Party	Candidate	Votes	%	±%
Republican	Cynthia Lummis (incumbent)	113,038	68.47%	−0.42%
Democratic	Richard Grayson	37,803	22.90%	−0.93%
Libertarian	Richard Brubaker	7,112	4.31%	+0.82%
Constitution	Daniel Clyde Cummings	6,749	4.09%	+2.04%
Write-in		398	0.24%	+0.07%
Total votes		165,100	100.00%	
	Overvotes	370		
	Undervotes	5,683		

2020 United States Senate Republican primary in Wyoming
Party	Candidate	Votes	%
Republican	Cynthia Lummis	63,511	59.67%
Republican	Robert Short	13,473	12.66%
Republican	Bryan Miller	10,946	10.28%
Republican	Donna Rice	5,881	5.53%
Republican	R. Mark Armstrong	3,904	3.67%
Republican	Joshua Wheeler	3,763	3.54%
Republican	John Holtz	1,820	1.71%
Republican	Devon Cade	1,027	0.96%
Republican	Michael Kemler	985	0.93%
Republican	Star Roselli	627	0.59%
Write-in		501	0.47%
Total votes		106,438	100.00%
	Overvotes	391	
	Undervotes	3,746	

2020 United States Senate election in Wyoming
Party	Candidate	Votes	%	±%
Republican	Cynthia Lummis	198,100	72.85%	+0.66%
Democratic	Merav Ben-David	72,766	26.76%	+9.31%
Write-in		1,071	0.39%	+0.11%
Total votes		271,937	100.00%	
	Overvotes	165		
	Undervotes	6,401		

== See also ==
- Women in the United States House of Representatives
- Women in the United States Senate

U.S. House of Representatives
Preceded by Barbara Cubin	Member of the U.S. House of Representatives from Wyoming's at-large congressional district 2009–2017	Succeeded by Liz Cheney
Preceded by Jan Schakowsky	Chair of the Congressional Women's Caucus; 2011–2013	Succeeded by Jaime Herrera Beutler
Party political offices
Preceded by Mike Enzi	Republican nominee for U.S. Senator from Wyoming (Class 2); 2020	Succeeded by Harriet Hageman
U.S. Senate
Preceded by Mike Enzi	U.S. Senator (Class 2) from Wyoming; 2021–present Served alongside: John Barrasso	Incumbent
U.S. order of precedence (ceremonial)
Preceded by John Hickenlooper	Order of precedence of the United States as United States Senator	Succeeded by Ben Ray Luján
Preceded by Ben Ray Luján	United States senators by seniority 71st	Succeeded by Roger Marshall
