= McIlvain =

McIlvain is a surname of Scottish origin. Notable people with the surname include:

- Bill McIlvain (born 1932), American politician
- Francis McIlvain, American foundry owner, namesake of his residence Francis McIlvain House
- Ryan McIlvain (born 1982), American novelist and essayist

== See also ==
- McIlvaine
