= McIlvaine =

McIlvaine is a surname of Scottish origin. Notable people with the surname include:

- Abraham Robinson McIlvaine (1804–1863), American politician, U.S. congressman from Pennsylvania
- Robinson McIlvaine (1913–2001), US diplomat
- Charles McIlvaine (mycologist) (1840–1909), American author and mycologist
- Charles Pettit McIlvaine (1799–1873), American Episcopalian bishop and author
- Jim McIlvaine (born 1972), American basketball player
- Joseph McIlvaine (1769–1826), American politician, U.S. senator from New Jersey
- Maria McIlvaine Gillmore (born Maria McIlvaine; 1871–1965), American writer and missionary
- Theodore Clinton McIlvaine (1875–1959), American agronomist
- Thomas McIlvaine (1854–1933), American illustrator

== See also ==
- McIlvain
