= Merav Ben-David =

Israeli-American ecologist (born 1959)

- מירב בן-דוד
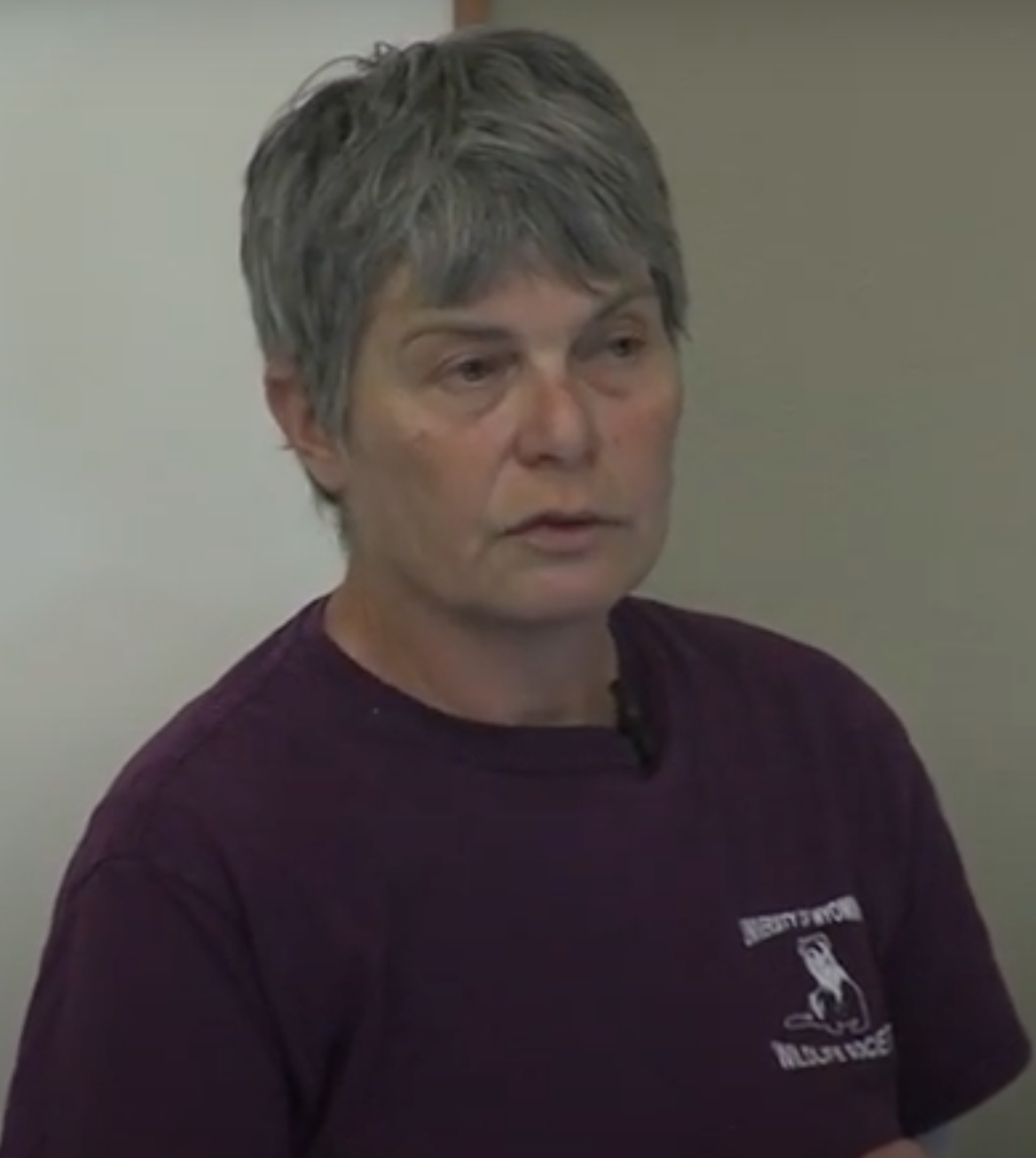

Personal details
- Born: January 17, 1959 (age 67) Rehovot, Israel
- Citizenship: Israel; United States
- Party: Democratic
- Education: Tel Aviv University (BS, MS); University of Alaska, Fairbanks (PhD)

Merav Ben-David (Hebrew: מירב בן-דוד; born 17 January 1959) is an Israeli-American ecologist, zoologist, and politician who is the chair of the Department of Zoology and Physiology at the University of Wyoming. She was the Democratic nominee in the 2020 United States Senate election in Wyoming, losing to former Congresswoman Cynthia Lummis in the general election. She ran for state representative from Wyoming's 46th District in 2022.

== Early life and education ==
Ben-David was born to a Jewish family in Rehovot, and raised on a farm near Rishon LeZion. She spent two years in the Israeli Air Force in fulfillment of the country's compulsory military service.

Ben-David earned a Bachelor of Science in Biology in 1984, and a Master of Science in 1988 from Tel Aviv University. She spent five years as a safari tour guide in Kenya, before moving to Alaska, where she studied wildlife management. She earned her PhD from the University of Alaska Fairbanks in 1996.

== Career ==
Ben-David emigrated from Israel to the United States due to worsening job prospects in Israel in the early 1990s as a result of the 1990s post-Soviet aliyah. After earning her PhD at the University of Alaska Fairbanks, Ben-David remained there as an ecologist. She was fascinated by local marine ecosystems, which included otters, mink, marten, polar bears, and the salmon they fed on.

In 2000, Ben-David became an associate professor at the University of Wyoming. She became a full professor in 2010. She has served as the editor-in-chief of Wildlife Monographs, succeeding Eric Hellgren in 2017. As of January 2020 she was head of the Department of Zoology and Physiology at the University of Wyoming.

Her work mostly centers around carnivores and their behavior in ecosystems. She has published more than 110 scientific papers that analyze the impact of climate change, invasive species, logging and pollution on animals, often using innovative research techniques. Among her most-cited works are studies applying stable isotope analysis to animal ecology to document changes in the diet of generalist predators; exploring the impact of flooding, predation, and salmon runs on vegetation in the Alexander Archipelago; and examining the effects of the 1989 Exxon Valdez oil spill on otters in Prince William Sound. She has helped to study the effects of the Exxon and BP spills in terms of both immediate and long-term effects. Her work was included in the Exxon Valdez Oil Spill Restoration Project Final Report, which assessed damage and potential for remediation, and was a basis for fining Exxon and BP after their respective oil spills of 1989 and 2010.

Ben-David has focused deeply on the river otter (Lontra canadensis), examining it in its role as a sentinel species and also using it as a model for predicting effects of pollutants on the rarer and more difficult to study sea otter (Enhydra lutris). She has carried out work with Alaskan otters for over 30 years. Her field studies of chemical bioaccumulation have gained international attention.

External videos
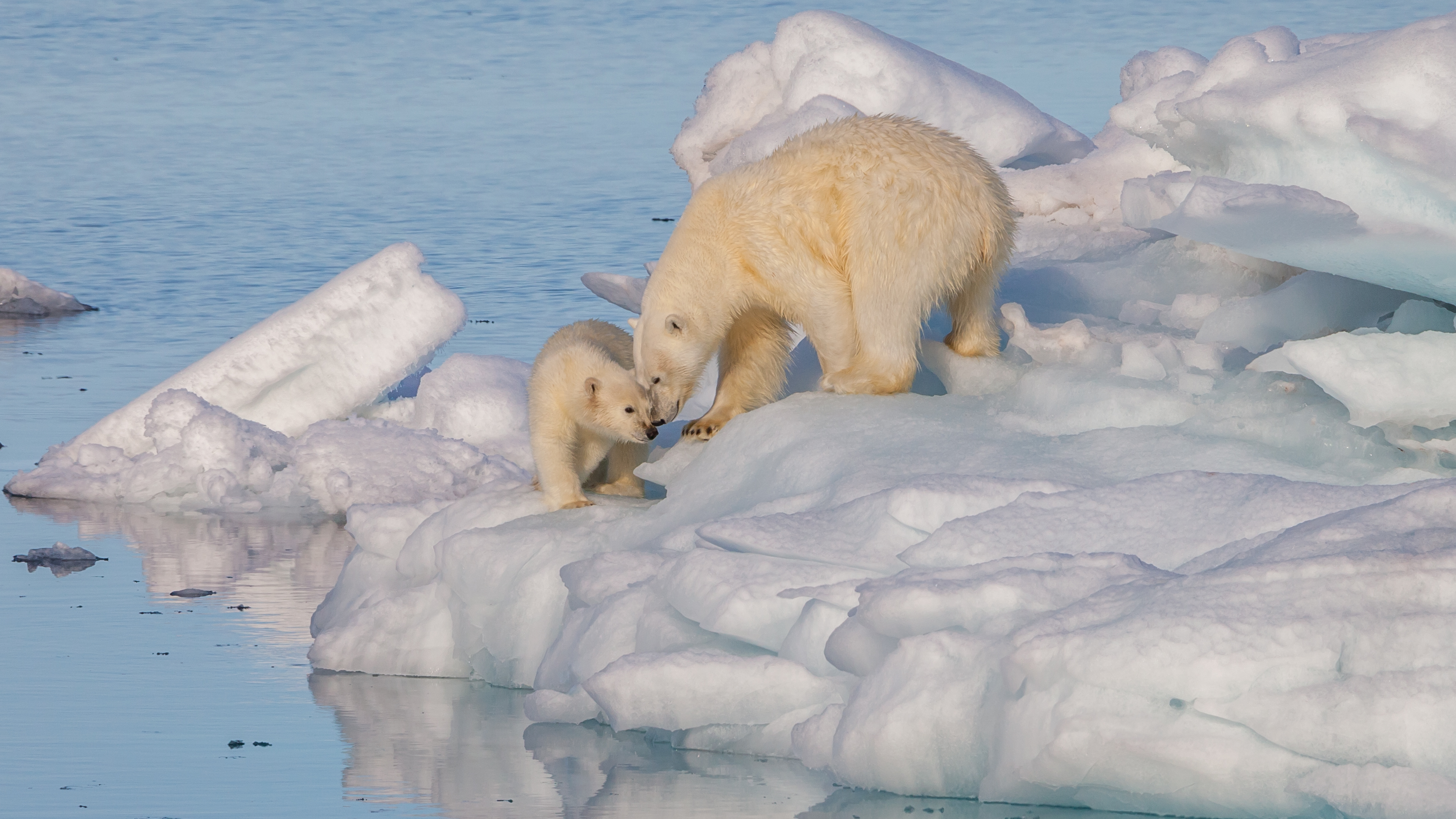
- Polar Bears and Climate Change: Walking on a Faster Treadmill, Merav Ben-David, 2016

She began studying the impact of human activity and climate change on polar bears in 2001. She has worked for nearly 20 years with Steven Amstrup to study polar bear ecology in the Beaufort Sea and other areas. One of the behavioral patterns she has observed via satellite tracking is that polar bears show high fidelity to the local area of ocean in which they live. As sea ice is thinning, it drifts faster, requiring polar bears to walk farther each day on the ice to retain their position. This increases the energy requirements of the bears while decreasing their available time to hunt. Models project that polar bear populations may collapse by 2080.

In 2004, she began another long-term project, studying chipmunks that live in the Laramie Mountains. One of the findings of Ben-David and her students is that chipmunks are more likely to survive the shorter winters resulting from climate change. Ben-David also studies river otters of the Powder River Basin, and the effects of nearby oil drilling. Her work has revealed low populations of otters in the New Fork River, compared to areas nearby.

Ben-David has received a variety of awards for her work including the Barrett-Hamilton distinguished ecologist award from the University of Manitoba in 2012 and the Excellence in Wildlife Education award from The Wildlife Society in 2016. She was selected as a Wildlife Fellow of the Wildlife Society in 2017. ‍

== Personal life ==
Ben-David has resided in Laramie, Wyoming, since 2000, and was naturalized as a United States citizen in 2009.

=== Politics ===
Ben-David announced her candidacy for the 2020 U.S. Senate election at the 2020 Wyoming Women's March in Cheyenne, Wyoming, on 18 January 2020. On 18 August 2020, she placed first in a field of six candidates to become the Democratic nominee.

Ben-David's platform centered on 'future-proofing' Wyoming's economy through diversification, including public investments in reclaiming old mines, capping oil and gas wells, and building wildlife crossings.

She lost the general election to Republican Cynthia Lummis, gaining just 27% of the vote.

She was the Democratic nominee for state representative from Wyoming's 46th District in 2022, running against Republican incumbent Ocean Andrew.

== Electoral history ==
=== 2020 ===
2020 U.S. Senate Democratic primary in Wyoming
Party	Candidate	Votes	%
Democratic	Merav Ben-David	9,579	40.98%
Democratic	Yana Ludwig	4,822	20.63%
Democratic	Nathan Wendt	4,166	17.82%
Democratic	Kenneth Casner	2,139	9.15%
Democratic	Rex Wilde	1,823	7.80%
Democratic	James DeBrine	843	3.61%
Total votes		23,372	100.0%

2020 U.S. Senate election in Wyoming
Party	Candidate	Votes	%	±%
Republican	Cynthia Lummis	198,100	72.85%	+0.66%
Democratic	Merav Ben-David	72,766	26.76%	+9.31%
Write-in		1,071	0.39%	+0.11%
Total votes		271,937	100.0%	
Republican hold				

=== 2022 ===
2022 Wyoming House of Representatives Democratic primary, District 46
Party	Candidate	Votes	%
Democratic	Merav Ben-David	Unopposed	

2022 Wyoming House of Representatives election, District 46
Party	Candidate	Votes	%
Republican	Ocean Andrew (incumbent)	2,638	68.8%
Democratic	Merav Ben-David	1,196	31.1%
Total votes		3,834	100%

Party political offices
Preceded by Charlie Hardy	Democratic nominee for U.S. Senator from Wyoming (Class 2); 2020	Succeeded by James W. Byrd
