= Paul Lester Errington =

American conservationist (1902–1962)

- Born: June 14, 1902; Bruce, South Dakota, US
- Died: November 5, 1962 (aged 60)
- Education: Brookings High School; South Dakota State College; University of Wisconsin–Madison
- Occupations: Conservationist; professor
- Spouse: Carolyn Storm (m. 1934)
- Children: 2

Paul Lester Errington (June 14, 1902 – November 5, 1962) was an American conservationist and professor. His work included field studies in wetlands, wildlife populations and keeping habitats intact. In the early 1930s, Errington realized that hunting restrictions did not stop North American wildlife from declining. He focused on how large changes made animals lose their habitats. Errington received multiple honors for his work.

== Personal life ==
Errington was born on June 14, 1902, in or near Bruce, South Dakota. When he was 7 years old, Errington was diagnosed with polio and he used time outside to help him become healthy. He hunted and trapped animals when he was 14 years old. Errington attended Brookings High School and graduated from there in 1921. He graduated from South Dakota State College in 1929 and received his PhD from University of Wisconsin–Madison in 1932. Errington met Aldo Leopold while attending the university and was in Leopold's office often. Leopold was interested in Errington's work, so he recommended Errington to the Iowa State College in 1932 as an assistant professor of zoology. Errington married Carolyn Storm in 1934, who graduated from law school and taught English. Their two sons were Peter and Frederick.

== Career ==
During his tenure at Iowa State College, Errington was the director of the first Cooperative Wildlife Research Unit in the United States which ran for 3 years. He was appointed as an associate professor in 1938 and then as a professor in 1948. Leopold asked 6 scientists to review his manuscript and Errington was one of those chosen to give his thoughts on Leopold's work, which was later published in 1933 as Game Management. Storm worked with Errington on his papers, edited some of Errington's books, and was a co-author on an article about tagging young muskrats. Errington said Storm was his "best literary critic".

Errington was a hunter, and he was neutral when it came to hunting restrictions and protectionists. In the early 1930s, Errington and other conservationists realized that hunting restrictions did not stop North American wildlife from declining. Errington, Leopold, and others thought that large changes to animal habitats were responsible for losing wildlife. As part of the Wildlife Society's Committee on Professional Standards in the early 1940s, Errington tried to create standards nationally that would give merits to game departments that participated in civil service. He edited the Journal of Wildlife Management and Ecology for almost a decade. In what ecologists James A. Pritchard, Diane M. Debinski, Brian Olechnowski and Ron Vannimwegen described as his "most significant intellectual contribution", Errington's work redefined predation. Prior to Errington's research, hunters thought that the less predators in an area would lead to more wild game. Wolves, coyotes, and cougars were eradicated in the 1920s and 1930s due to this belief. Errington's belief was that predators helped naturally control populations and he completed years-long field studies of multiple animal populations to reach that conclusion. His work reshaped the public's perception of predation.

Errington was concerned that growing human populations could increase demand for natural resources. He believed that humans are not as disconnected from wildlife as was perceived by some people. Errington thought it is a mistake to mess with habitats that should be left alone, and he worked to preserve wildlife habitats. He was against the control of native vertebrates including birds of prey. Much of Errington's work focused on the wetlands of the Midwestern United States. After Errington's field work on wetlands, those locations had an increase in open water, marsh loss, and increased land cover with a few being used for public recreation. Much of Errington's studies focused on muskrats and focused on the value of wetlands. Errington wrote about animals during his work, including geese, owls, hawks, and salamanders.

== Death ==
In 1962, shortly before his death, Errington received two honors for his publications by the Wildlife Society, who also gave him the Aldo Leopold Medal for his "achievement and service to wildlife conservation". After Errington died on November 5, 1962, Storm used his unfinished manuscripts to write Of Predation and Life in 1967, The Red Gods Call in 1973, and a poem collection titled A Question of Values in 1987. Iowa State University hosts an Errington Memorial Lecture each year that brings together lecturers who are thought to be similar to Errington. Errington Marsh in Polk County, Iowa, was named after him.

== Works cited ==
- Pritchard, James A.; Debinski, Diane M.; Olechnowski, Brian; Vannimwegen, Ron (2006). "The Landscape of Paul Errington's Work". Wildlife Society Bulletin. 34 (5): 1411–1416. doi:10.2193/0091-7648(2006)34[1411:TLOPEW]2.0.CO;2. ISSN 0091-7648. JSTOR 4134277. S2CID 86474895.
- Zanish-belcher, Tanya. "Errington, Paul Lester". The Biographical Dictionary of Iowa.
