= Journal of Wildlife Management =

- Discipline: Zoology
- Language: English
- Edited by: Paul R. Krausman

Publication details
- History: 1937–present
- Publisher: John Wiley & Sons (United States)
- Frequency: 8/year
- Impact factor: 2.055 (2017)

Standard abbreviations
- ISO 4: J. Wildl. Manag.
- NLM: J Wildl Manage

Indexing
- ISSN: 0022-541X (print); 1937-2817 (web)
- LCCN: 51017007
- JSTOR: 0022541X
- OCLC no.: 1782497

Links
- Journal homepage

The Journal of Wildlife Management is a peer-reviewed scientific journal devoted to the ecology of non-domesticated animal species. It is published by John Wiley & Sons on behalf of The Wildlife Society.

== History ==
July 1937 – first issue of the journal.

== See also ==
- Wildlife Monographs
- Wildlife Society Bulletin
