= Thomas McIlvaine =

American illustrator (1854–1933)

Thomas McIlvaine (October 4, 1854 – December 7, 1933) was an American illustrator.

== Life ==
McIlvaine was born in Philadelphia, Pennsylvania in 1854. He married Sybilla Mayer in 1880, and the couple had three sons: Perry, Thomas Jr., and Roy. He died in Brooklyn, New York on December 7, 1933.

== Work ==
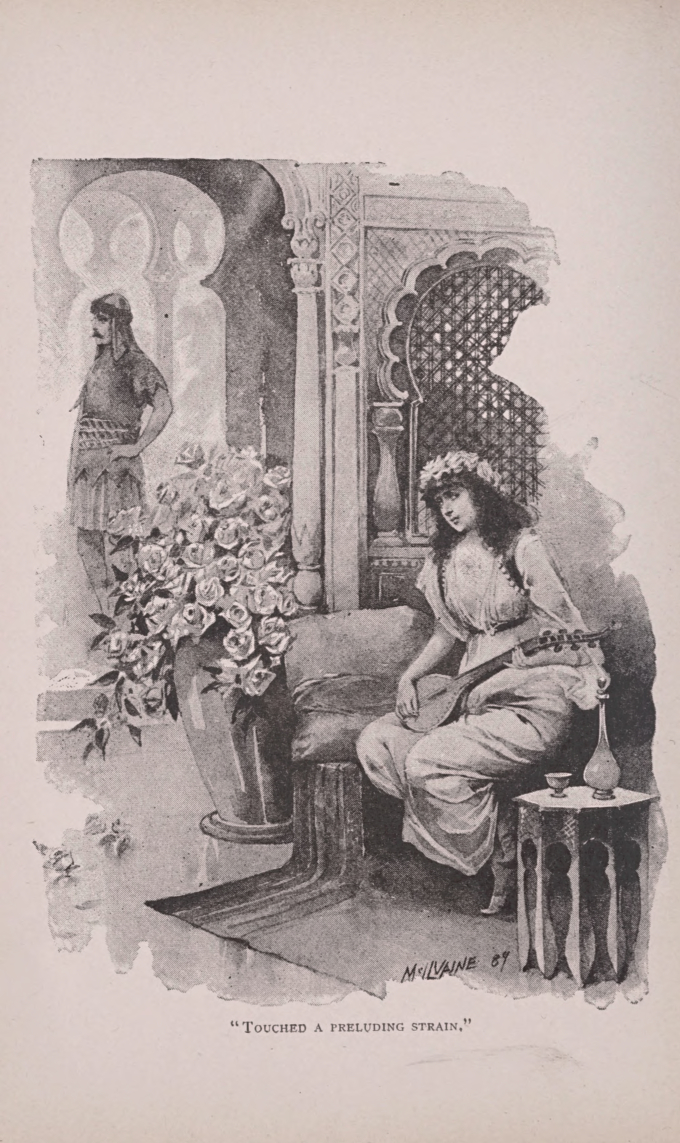
Illustration from Lalla Rookh by Thomas McIlvaine

McIlvaine was primarily noted as an illustrator. He contributed 100 illustrations to an 1890 edition of Thomas Moore's poem Lalla Rookh. In 1893 he provided twelve full-page watercolors, twelve full-page halftones, and other smaller illustrations for Frederick A. Stokes Company's edition of Lucile by Robert Bulwer-Lytton (writing as "Owen Meredith").

Other Works:

- The Arabian Nights' Entertainments (2 v.); George Fyler Townsend (ed.); 1891
- 100 illustrations from Selections from the Poetical Works of Robert Browning; 1892
- The Princess Margarethe; John D. Barry; 1893
- 20 illustrations from The Wonderful “One-Hoss-Shay” And Other Poems; Oliver Wendell Holmes Sr.; 1897
- Mother-Song and Child-Song; Charlotte Brewster Jordan (ed.); 1898
- A Treasury of American Verse; Walter Learned (ed.); 1901 (with H.C.Edwards)
- The Sociable Ghost; "Olive Harper" (Ellen D'Apery); 1903 (with A.W. Schwartz)
- The Dear Old Home; Sara Ellmaker Ambler; 1906
