= Alvin Wiederspahn =

American politician and attorney

Member of the Wyoming Senate from the 22nd district
- In office 1985–1988

Member of the Wyoming House of Representatives
- In office 1979–1984

Personal details
- Born: January 18, 1949 Cheyenne, Wyoming, U.S.
- Died: October 24, 2014 (aged 65) Cheyenne, Wyoming, U.S.
- Party: Democratic
- Spouse: Cynthia Lummis (m. 1983)
- Children: 1
- Education: University of Wyoming (BS); University of Denver (JD)

Alvin Wiederspahn (January 18, 1949 – October 24, 2014) was an American politician and attorney who served as a member of the Wyoming House of Representatives (1979–1984) and Wyoming Senate (1985–1988).

== Early life and education ==
Wiederspahn was born in Cheyenne, Wyoming, on January 18, 1949. He graduated from Cheyenne Central High School and later received a Bachelor of Science degree in zoology from the University of Wyoming and Juris Doctor from Sturm College of Law at the University of Denver.

== Career ==
After graduating from law school, Wiederspahn was admitted to the Wyoming State Bar and began practicing law in Cheyenne. A member of the Democratic Party, he served in the Wyoming House of Representatives from 1979 to 1984 and Wyoming Senate from 1985 until 1988.

== Personal life ==
Wiederspahn was the husband of Wyoming's United States senator Cynthia Lummis. They had one daughter, Annaliese. His widow is a Republican.

Wiederspahn died of a heart attack in Cheyenne on October 24, 2014. He was buried at Beth El Cemetery. After Wiederspahn's death, Lummis dropped her bid for the chairmanship of the Republican Study Committee and opted not to seek a fifth term in the U.S. House, retiring in 2017. Lummis went on to win the 2020 U.S. Senate election to replace the retiring incumbent Mike Enzi.
