= Olive Harper =

American journalist, writer, and poet (1842–1915)

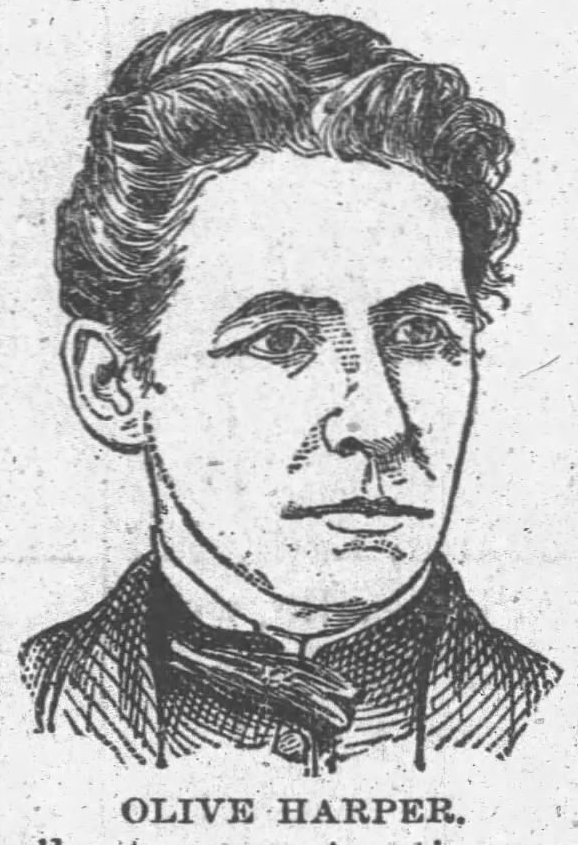
- Olive Harper c.1887
- Born: Ellen Burrell; September 28, 1842; Tunkhannock, Pennsylvania
- Died: May 2, 1915 (aged 72)
- Occupations: Journalist; Writer; Poet

Olive Harper (September 28, 1842 – May 2, 1915), the alias of Ellen Burrell D'Apery, was an American journalist, writer, and poet. Her novels comprise mystery, detective, and science fiction stories, including A Fair Californian (1889), The Show Girl: Or, the Cap of Fortune (1902), and The Sociable Ghost (1903). She also wrote novelizations of various plays, primarily written by Owen Davis, including The Gambler of the West (1906) and King of the Bigamists (1909).

== Life ==
Harper, also known by her real name Ellen Burrell, was a writer and journalist born on September 28, 1842, in Tunkhannock, Pennsylvania. She was the daughter of Albert Harper, one of the pioneers of the city of Oakland, California, where Harper and her family moved in 1851.

Growing up in Oakland, Harper faced numerous challenges including gun violence, disease outbreaks, and encounters with dangerous wildlife such as grizzly bears and rattlesnakes. At the age of twelve, Harper and her younger sister both contracted diphtheria during an epidemic, with her sister ultimately dying. Despite these challenges, she excelled academically and was known for her intelligence and love of reading. However, she also had a reputation for being rebellious and frequently clashed with her peers, teachers, and other adults due to her intolerance of what she saw as hypocrisy or snobbery.

At the age of fifteen, Harper married George Gibson, a 42-year-old businessman and acquaintance of her father, against her parents' wishes. However, Gibson's business struggles and resulting alcoholism led to him becoming abusive towards Harper, leading her to divorce him for "cruel and inhuman treatment" after around fourteen years of marriage. During the divorce proceedings, she also contracted typhoid pneumonia and severe rheumatism, which left her reliant on crutches for the rest of her life.

Following the divorce, Harper, now a single mother of three children, decided to become a professional writer. Despite facing significant challenges, she quickly found success, publishing articles and poetry in numerous newspapers across the United States and becoming a lecturer known for her frankness, wit, and occasional inclusion of erotic and adult themes in her poetry.

In 1873, Harper was sent to Europe by the Daily Alta California and the St. Louis Globe to write and report on the Vienna Exhibition and other cities she visited along the way. While in London, she caused controversy with two articles critical of Ambrose Bierce and Algernon Charles Swinburne, both prominent literary figures at the time. During her time in Vienna, she met and married Telemaque D'Apery, the Franco-Turkish son of a Napoleonic officer, and a former Ottoman imperial treasurer. The couple then moved to Constantinople, where they were involved in a plot against the Sultan and Harper was arrested and imprisoned until the American consul secured her release. They later moved to New York City, where Harper gave birth to a son, Tello, in 1877.

Throughout the rest of her career, Harper continued to produce articles on a variety of topics for numerous newspapers and also wrote several novels and short stories. When her other work began to dwindle around 1902, she turned to writing novelizations of plays for Ogilvie Publishing, producing at least thirty of these over a decade.

Harper died on May 2, 1915, at 72 years of age due to injuries sustained in a train accident.

== Publications ==
=== Novelizations ===
==== Owen Davis plays ====
- The Gambler of the West (1906)
- It's Never Too Late to Mend (1907), also called The Wanderer's Return
- Tony, the Bootblack (1907), also called Tracking the Black Hand Band
- Jack Sheppard, the Bandit King; or, From the Cradle to the Grave (1908)
- The Creole Slave's Revenge (1908), under Davis' pseudonym Walter Lawrence
- The Millionaire and the Policeman's Wife (1908)
- On Trial for His Life (1908)
- The Opium Smugglers of Frisco; or, The Crime of a Beautiful Opium Fiend (1908)
- The Workingman's Wife (1909)
- The Queen of the Secret Seven (1909), under Davis' pseudonym Ike Swift
- The Chinatown Trunk Mystery (1909)
- The Convict's Sweetheart (1909)
- The River Pirates (1909), under Davis' pseudonym Walter Lawrence
- Sal, the Circus Gal (1909)

==== Theodore Kremer plays ====
- The Desperate Chance (1903)
- Bertha, The Sewing Machine Girl (1906)
- King of the Bigamists (1909)

==== James Hal Reid plays ====
- Joe Welch, The Peddler (1903)
- A Millionaire's Revenge (1906)
- The Shoemaker (1907)
- A Slave of the Mill (1905), the original play was co-written with Harry Gordon.

==== Other playwrights ====
- The Show Girl; or, the Cap of Fortune (1902). Original by R. A. Barnett.
- The Little Gray Lady (1906). Original by Channing Pollock.
- A Daughter of the South (1906). Original by Earl Burgess.
- Fighting Bill, Sheriff of Silver Creek (1907). Original by Mittenthal Bros.
- Through Death Valley (1907). Original by Joseph Le Brandt.
- The Shadow Behind the Throne (1908). Original by Alicia Ramsay and Rudolph de Cordova.
- The Queen of the Outlaw's Camp (1909). Original by Edward M. Simonds.
- Wanted by the Police (1909). Original by Arthur Langdon McCormick.
- The White Captive (1910). Original by Robert Wayne.
- Caught in Mid-Ocean (1911). Original by Arthur John Lamb.
- The Burglar and the Lady (1912). Original by Arthur Langdon McCormick.

=== Other works ===
- The Tame Turk: A Novel (1877), Tinsley Bros.
- Mother's Menagerie, short story appearing in sindication in 1887
- A Fair Californian (1889), Minerva Publishing Company.
- The Sociable Ghost (1903), J S Ogilvie Company.
- Cleopatra (poem), date of publishing and publisher unknown, co-written by William Wetmore Story and William Haines Lytle.

=== Translations ===
- The Simple Life (1904), written by Charles Wagner, translated from French, published by Grosset & Dunlap.
- The Voice of Nature; or, The Soul of Things (1904), written by Charles Wagner, translated from French, published by J S Ogilvie Company.
- Arsene Lupin versus Herlock Sholmes (1910), written by Maurice Leblanc, translated from French, published by J S Ogilvie Company.
- The Extraordinary Adventures of Arsene Lupin: Gentleman Burglar (1910), written by Maurice Leblanc, translated from French, published by J S Ogilvie Company.
