= 2020 United States Senate election in Wyoming =

- November 3, 2020
- Turnout: 62.6% ▲
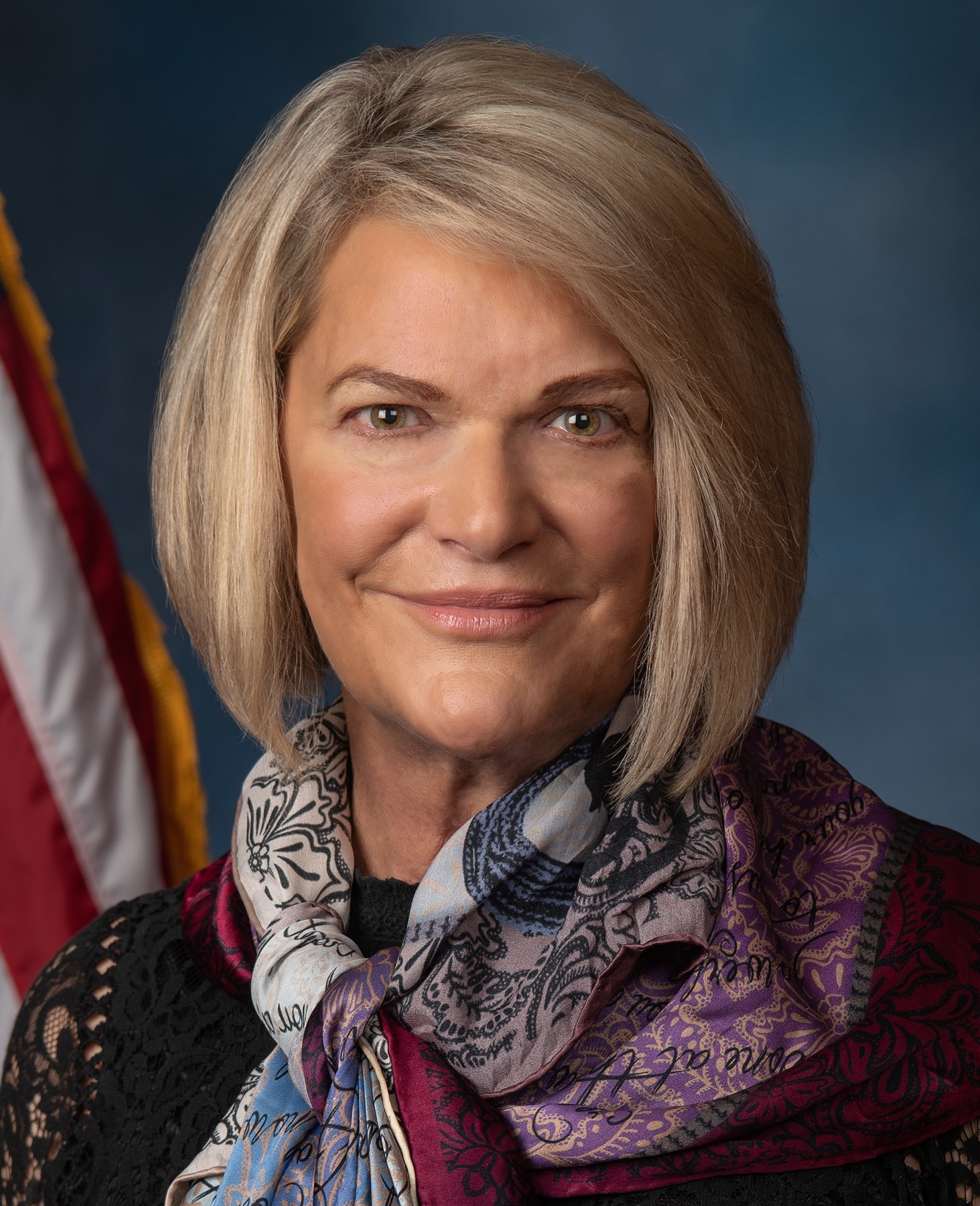

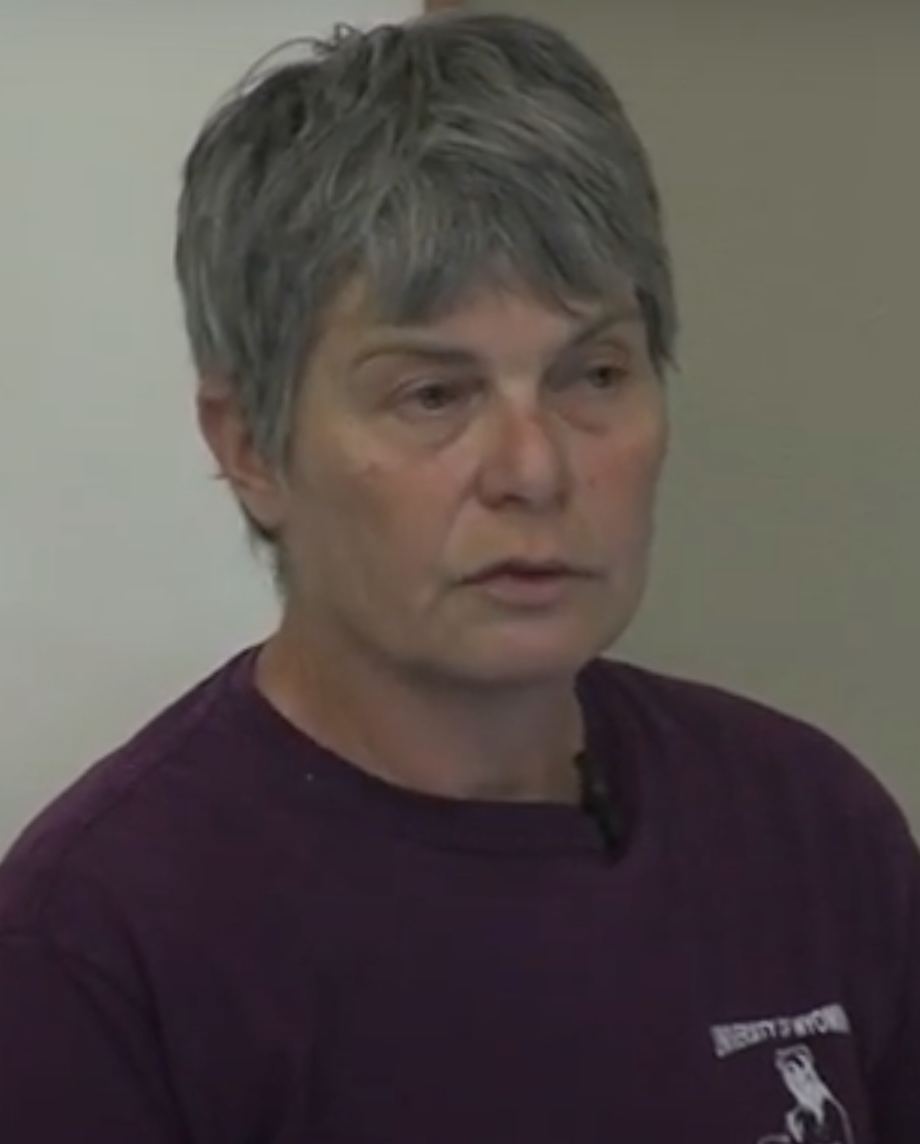
Nominee	Cynthia Lummis	Merav Ben-David
Party	Republican	Democratic
Popular vote	198,100	72,766
Percentage	72.85%	26.76%
- Lummis: 50–60% 60–70% 70–80% 80–90% >90% Ben-David: 50–60% 60–70% 70–80% No data
U.S. senator before election
Mike Enzi
Republican
Elected U.S. Senator
Cynthia Lummis
Republican

The 2020 United States Senate election in Wyoming was held on November 3, 2020, to elect a member of the United States Senate to represent the State of Wyoming, concurrently with the 2020 U.S. presidential election, as well as other elections to the United States Senate in other states and elections to the United States House of Representatives and various state and local elections. Cynthia Lummis defeated Democrat Merav Ben-David by more than 46 percentage points, becoming the first female U.S. Senator from Wyoming and succeeding fellow Republican Mike Enzi, who did not run for reelection. This was the first open Senate seat since 1996, when Enzi was first elected. The Democratic and Republican party primary elections were held on August 18, 2020. This was the first time since 1996 that Democrats won any county for this seat.

Cynthia Lummis won the election with 72.85% of the popular vote, winning 2.91% more than President Donald Trump had won in the concurrent presidential election in the state.

== Republican primary ==
=== Candidates ===
==== Nominee ====
- Cynthia Lummis, former U.S. representative for Wyoming's at-large congressional district and former Treasurer of Wyoming

==== Eliminated in primary ====
- R. Mark Armstrong, geologist
- Devon Cade, businessman
- John Holtz, attorney and U.S. Air Force veteran
- Michael Kemler
- Bryan Miller, candidate for U.S. Senate in 2014
- Donna Rice, estate lawyer
- Star Roselli, conspiracy theorist
- Robert Short, Converse County commissioner and businessman
- Joshua Wheeler, Wyoming Army National Guard veteran

==== Withdrawn ====
- Patrick Dotson, retiree
- Rolland Holthus

==== Declined ====
- Liz Cheney, incumbent U.S. representative for Wyoming's at-large congressional district, Chair of House Republican Conference, and daughter of the 46th Vice President Dick Cheney (running for re-election)
- Mike Enzi, incumbent U.S. senator (endorsed Cynthia Lummis)
- Foster Friess, businessman and former governor candidate
- Mark Gordon, governor of Wyoming
- Robert Grady, policy adviser to former president George H. W. Bush
- Matt Mead, former governor of Wyoming
- Donald Trump Jr., businessman and son of President of the United States Donald Trump

=== Endorsements ===
Cynthia Lummis

U.S. senators

- John Barrasso, U.S. senator (WY)
- Bill Cassidy, U.S. senator (LA)
- Ted Cruz, U.S. senator (TX) and candidate for President in 2016
- Mike Enzi, U.S. senator (WY)
- Mike Lee, U.S. senator (UT)
- Rand Paul, U.S. senator (KY) and candidate for President in 2016

U. S. Representatives

- Michele Bachmann, former U.S. representative (MN) and 2012 presidential candidate
- Jason Chaffetz, former U.S. representative (UT)
- Mark Meadows, former U.S. representative (R-NC) and White House Chief of Staff

Organizations

- Citizens United
- Club for Growth
- Concerned Women for America
- Gun Owners of America
- NRA Political Victory Fund
- Senate Conservatives Fund
- Students for Trump
- United States Chamber of Commerce

Individuals

- Foster Friess, businessman and 2018 Wyoming gubernatorial election candidate

=== Polling ===
Poll source	Date(s) administered	Sample size (Note: Key: A – all adults RV – registered voters LV – likely voters V – unclear)	Margin of error	Mark Armstrong	Jillian Ballow	Liz Cheney	Foster Friess	Cynthia Lummis	Undecided
	January 16, 2020	Cheney announces she will not run							
The Tarrance Group (R) (Note: Poll sponsored by "a group of Republican activists and donors")	June 22–24, 2019	502 (LV)	± 4.5%	–	–	56%	–	34%	–

=== Results ===
Results by county: Lummis: 60–70%; 70–80%; 80–90%; Short: 50–60%

Republican primary results
Party	Candidate	Votes	%
Republican	Cynthia Lummis	63,511	59.67%
Republican	Robert Short	13,473	12.66%
Republican	Bryan Miller	10,946	10.28%
Republican	Donna Rice	5,881	5.53%
Republican	R. Mark Armstrong	3,904	3.67%
Republican	Joshua Wheeler	3,763	3.53%
Republican	John Holtz	1,820	1.71%
Republican	Devon Cade	1,027	0.96%
Republican	Michael Kemler	985	0.93%
Republican	Star Roselli	627	0.59%
Republican	Write-ins	501	0.47%
Total votes		106,438	100.00%

== Democratic primary ==
=== Candidates ===
==== Nominee ====
- Merav Ben-David, Chair of the Department of Zoology and Physiology at the University of Wyoming and wildlife ecologist

==== Eliminated in primary ====
- Kenneth R. Casner, Democratic candidate for the 2018 Wyoming gubernatorial election and Democratic nominee for District 47 of the Wyoming House of Representatives in 2016
- James DeBrine, progressive activist
- Yana Ludwig, democratic socialist activist and community organizer
- Nathan Wendt, think tank executive, management consultant, businessman, entrepreneur
- Rex Wilde, veteran, service technician, Democratic candidate for the 2018 Wyoming gubernatorial election and Democratic candidate for the 2014 United States Senate election in Wyoming

==== Withdrawn ====
- Chuck Jagoda, teacher

=== Endorsements ===
Merav Ben-David

Local officials

- Gary Trauner, member of the Teton County School District Number 1 Board of Trustees (2006–2008) and businessman

Individuals

- Jason Shogren, Department Chair in the Department of Economics at the University of Wyoming

Organizations

- Retake the Senate 2020
- We the People
- Women to Win
Nathan Wendt

U.S. senators

- Tammy Duckworth, U.S. senator from Illinois (2017–present), U.S. Representative from Illinois's 8th congressional district (2013–2017), Assistant Secretary of Veterans Affairs for Public and Intergovernmental Affairs (2009–2011), Director of the Illinois Department of Veterans Affairs (2006–2009)

U.S. Ambassadors

- Richard Newton Holwill, American Ambassador Extraordinary and Plenipotentiary to Ecuador (1988–1989)

Local officials

- Pete Muldoon, Mayor of Jackson, Wyoming
Yana Ludwig

Organizations

- Democratic Socialists of America - Southeast Wyoming chapter
- Our Revolution - Casper chapter

=== Results ===
Results by county: Ben-David: 30–40%; 40–50%; 50–60%

Democratic primary results
Party	Candidate	Votes	%
Democratic	Merav Ben-David	9,584	40.28%
Democratic	Yana Ludwig	4,931	20.73%
Democratic	Nathan Wendt	4,212	17.70%
Democratic	Kenneth Casner	2,139	8.99%
Democratic	Rex Wilde	1,888	7.93%
Democratic	James DeBrine	865	3.64%
Democratic	Write-ins	173	0.73%
Total votes		23,792	100.00%

By county

	Merav Ben-David		Yana Ludwig		Nathan Wendt		Kenneth Casner		Rex Wilde		James DeBrine		Total
County	Votes	%	Votes	%	Votes	%	Votes	%	Votes	%	Votes	%	Votes
Albany	1,867	56.07%	809	24.29%	314	9.43%	187	5.62%	84	2.52%	69	2.07%	3,330
Big Horn	84	38.71%	49	22.58%	42	19.35%	18	8.29%	17	7.83%	7	3.23%	217
Campbell	144	31.51%	114	24.95%	105	22.98%	37	8.10%	35	7.66%	22	4.81%	457
Carbon	199	32.36%	110	17.89%	86	13.98%	138	22.44%	43	6.99%	39	6.34%	615
Converse	78	32.37%	53	21.99%	38	15.77%	36	14.94%	19	7.88%	17	7.05%	241
Crook	43	39.45%	22	20.18%	19	17.43%	11	10.09%	7	6.42%	7	6.42%	109
Fremont	831	42.81%	424	21.84%	296	15.25%	155	7.99%	145	7.47%	90	4.64%	1,941
Goshen	148	36.63%	109	26.98%	66	16.34%	37	9.16%	27	6.68%	17	4.21%	404
Hot Springs	81	52.26%	27	17.42%	13	8.39%	11	7.10%	17	10.97%	6	3.87%	155
Johnson	99	51.03%	32	16.49%	36	18.56%	15	7.73%	7	3.61%	5	2.58%	194
Laramie	1,808	36.02%	942	18.76%	800	15.94%	712	14.18%	556	11.08%	202	4.02%	5,020
Lincoln	146	37.73%	75	19.38%	83	21.45%	27	6.98%	47	12.14%	9	2.33%	387
Natrona	933	38.68%	527	21.85%	436	18.08%	278	11.53%	142	5.89%	96	3.98%	2,412
Niobrara	19	48.72%	9	23.08%	4	10.26%	2	5.13%	4	10.26%	1	2.56%	39
Park	313	43.53%	158	21.97%	117	16.27%	47	6.54%	61	8.48%	23	3.20%	719
Platte	142	36.79%	54	13.99%	72	18.65%	43	11.14%	41	10.62%	34	8.81%	386
Sheridan	545	45.45%	244	20.35%	213	17.76%	84	7.01%	66	5.50%	47	3.92%	1,199
Sublette	104	59.09%	25	14.20%	27	15.34%	8	4.55%	11	6.25%	1	0.57%	176
Sweetwater	638	30.40%	392	18.68%	439	20.91%	162	7.72%	371	17.68%	97	4.62%	2,099
Teton	1,063	39.52%	557	20.71%	889	33.05%	67	2.49%	79	2.94%	35	1.30%	2,690
Uinta	198	37.57%	129	24.48%	71	13.47%	39	7.40%	69	13.09%	21	3.98%	527
Washakie	65	33.68%	42	21.76%	36	18.65%	19	9.84%	20	10.36%	11	5.70%	193
Weston	37	35.92%	25	24.27%	11	10.68%	7	6.80%	14	13.59%	9	8.74%	103
Total	9,585	40.59%	4,928	20.87%	4,213	17.84%	2,140	9.06%	1,882	7.97%	865	3.66%	23,613

== General election ==
=== Predictions ===
Source	Ranking	As of
The Cook Political Report	Safe R	October 29, 2020
Inside Elections	Safe R	October 28, 2020
Sabato's Crystal Ball	Safe R	November 2, 2020
Daily Kos	Safe R	October 30, 2020
Politico	Safe R	November 2, 2020
RCP	Safe R	October 23, 2020
DDHQ	Safe R	November 3, 2020
538	Safe R	November 2, 2020
Economist	Safe R	November 2, 2020

=== Post-primary endorsements ===
Cynthia Lummis (R)

U.S. presidents

- Donald Trump, 45th president of the United States

Organizations

- Susan B. Anthony List
Merav Ben-David (D)

U.S. vice presidents

- Joe Biden, 47th Vice President of the United States (2009–2017), United States Senator from Delaware (1973–2009), Democratic nominee for the 2020 United States presidential election

U.S. senators

- Ed Markey, U.S. senator from Massachusetts (2013–present), Member of the U.S. House of Representatives from Massachusetts's 5th congressional district (2013), Massachusetts's 7th congressional district (1976–2013)
- Elizabeth Warren, U.S. senator from Massachusetts (2013–present)

Organizations

- Center for Biological Diversity
- Friends of the Earth
- Retake the Senate 2020
- Sierra Club
- We the People
- Women to Win
- Wyoming Democratic Party

=== Polling ===
Poll source	Date(s) administered	Sample size	Margin of error	Cynthia Lummis (R)	Merav Ben-David (D)	Undecided
University of Wyoming	October 8–28, 2020	614 (LV)	± 4%	56%	26%	–

=== Results ===
Lummis outperformed fellow Republican Donald Trump in the concurrent presidential election by 2.9%, or 4,541 votes. She also won Albany County by 1%, or 182 raw votes, while Trump lost it by 2.7%, or 513 votes. She performed significantly better in the Democratic stronghold of Teton County, receiving 37.3% of the total vote, compared to Trump's 29.6%.

United States Senate election in Wyoming, 2020
Party	Candidate	Votes	%	±%
Republican	Cynthia Lummis	198,100	72.85%	+0.66%
Democratic	Merav Ben-David	72,766	26.76%	+9.31%
Write-in		1,071	0.39%	+0.11%
Total votes		271,937	100.00%	
Republican hold				

==== By county ====
County	Cynthia Lummis Republican		Merav Ben-David Democratic		Write-in		Margin		Total votes
County	#	%	#	%	#	%	#	%	Total votes
Albany	9,220	50.30	9,038	49.31	70	0.38	182	0.99	18,328
Big Horn	4,887	86.42	756	13.37	12	0.21	4,131	73.05	5,655
Campbell	16,960	89.19	1,938	10.19	117	0.62	15,022	79.00	19,015
Carbon	5,091	77.70	1,441	21.99	20	0.31	3,650	55.71	6,552
Converse	5,715	84.01	1,028	15.11	60	0.88	4,687	68.90	6,803
Crook	3,653	90.35	372	9.20	18	0.45	3,281	81.15	4,043
Fremont	12,314	69.43	5,385	30.36	36	0.20	6,929	39.07	17,735
Goshen	4,910	79.93	1,206	19.63	27	0.44	3,704	60.30	6,143
Hot Springs	2,001	79.03	527	20.81	4	0.16	1,474	58.22	2,532
Johnson	3,921	81.15	905	18.73	6	0.12	3,016	62.42	4,832
Laramie	29,357	65.64	15,153	33.88	212	0.47	14,204	31.76	44,722
Lincoln	8,846	85.63	1,460	14.13	24	0.23	7,386	71.50	10,330
Natrona	25,061	72.75	9,210	26.74	178	0.52	15,851	46.01	34,449
Niobrara	1,133	87.69	156	12.07	3	0.23	977	75.62	1,292
Park	13,189	80.54	3,117	19.03	70	0.43	10,072	61.51	16,376
Platte	3,962	81.36	898	18.44	10	0.20	3,064	62.92	4,870
Sheridan	12,287	76.17	3,778	23.42	67	0.41	8,509	52.75	16,132
Sublette	4,004	82.52	835	17.21	13	0.27	3,169	65.31	4,852
Sweetwater	12,351	75.89	3,877	23.82	46	0.28	8,474	52.07	16,274
Teton	5,370	37.20	9,030	62.56	34	0.23	-3,660	-25.36	14,434
Uinta	7,550	82.32	1,597	17.41	25	0.27	5,953	64.90	9,172
Washakie	3,277	83.00	659	16.69	12	0.30	2,618	66.31	3,948
Weston	3,041	88.20	400	11.60	7	0.20	2,641	76.60	3,448
Totals	198,100	72.85	72,766	26.76	1,071	0.39	125,334	46.09	271,937

Counties that flipped from Republican to Democratic

- Teton (largest municipality: Jackson)

== Notes ==
Partisan clients

Voter samples and additional candidates
