= 2002 United States House of Representatives election in Wyoming =

2002 United States House of Representatives election in Wyoming's at-large district
- November 5, 2002
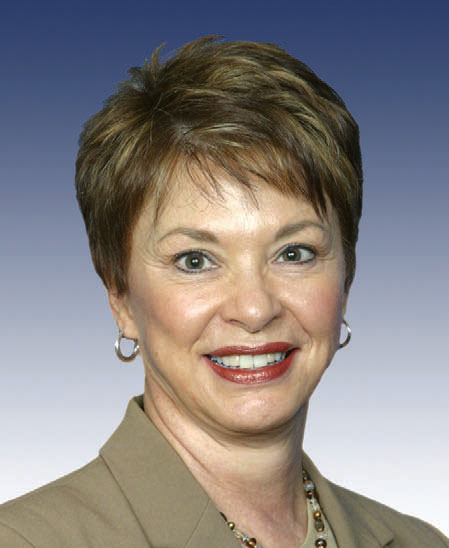

Nominee	Barbara Cubin	Ron Akin
Party	Republican	Democratic
Popular vote	110,229	65,961
Percentage	60.51%	36.21%
- County results Cubin: 40–50% 50–60% 60–70% 70–80% 80–90%
U.S. Representative before election
Barbara Cubin
Republican
Elected U.S. Representative
Barbara Cubin
Republican

The 2002 United States House of Representatives election in Wyoming was held on November 5, 2002. Incumbent Republican Congresswoman Barbara Cubin ran for re-election. She faced no opposition in the general election and was opposed by Democratic nominee Ron Akin, a U.S. Air Force veteran, in the general election. Despite Democrats' success in the gubernatorial election, Cubin did not face a serious challenge and won her fifth term in a landslide.

== Democratic primary ==
=== Candidates ===
- Ron Akin, retired U.S. Air Force chief master sergeant
- John Swett, Laramie City Planning Commissioner, investment broker

=== Results ===
Democratic primary results
Party	Candidate	Votes	%
Democratic	Ron Akin	20,068	63.72%
Democratic	John Swett	11,526	36.28%
Total votes		31,494	100.00%

== Republican primary ==
=== Candidates ===
- Barbara Cubin, incumbent U.S. Representative

=== Results ===
Republican primary results
Party	Candidate	Votes	%
Republican	Barbara Cubin (inc.)	66,235	100.00%
Total votes		66,235	100.00%

== General election ==
=== Predictions ===
Source	Ranking	As of
Sabato's Crystal Ball	Safe R	November 4, 2002
New York Times	Safe R	October 14, 2002

=== Results ===
2002 Wyoming's at-large congressional district general election results
Party	Candidate	Votes	%
Republican	Barbara Cubin (inc.)	110,229	60.51%
Democratic	Ron Akin	65,961	36.21%
Libertarian	Lewis Stock	5,962	3.27%
Total votes		182,152	100.00%
Republican hold			
