= Francis McIlvain House =

Historic house in Pennsylvania, United States

- U.S. National Register of Historic Places
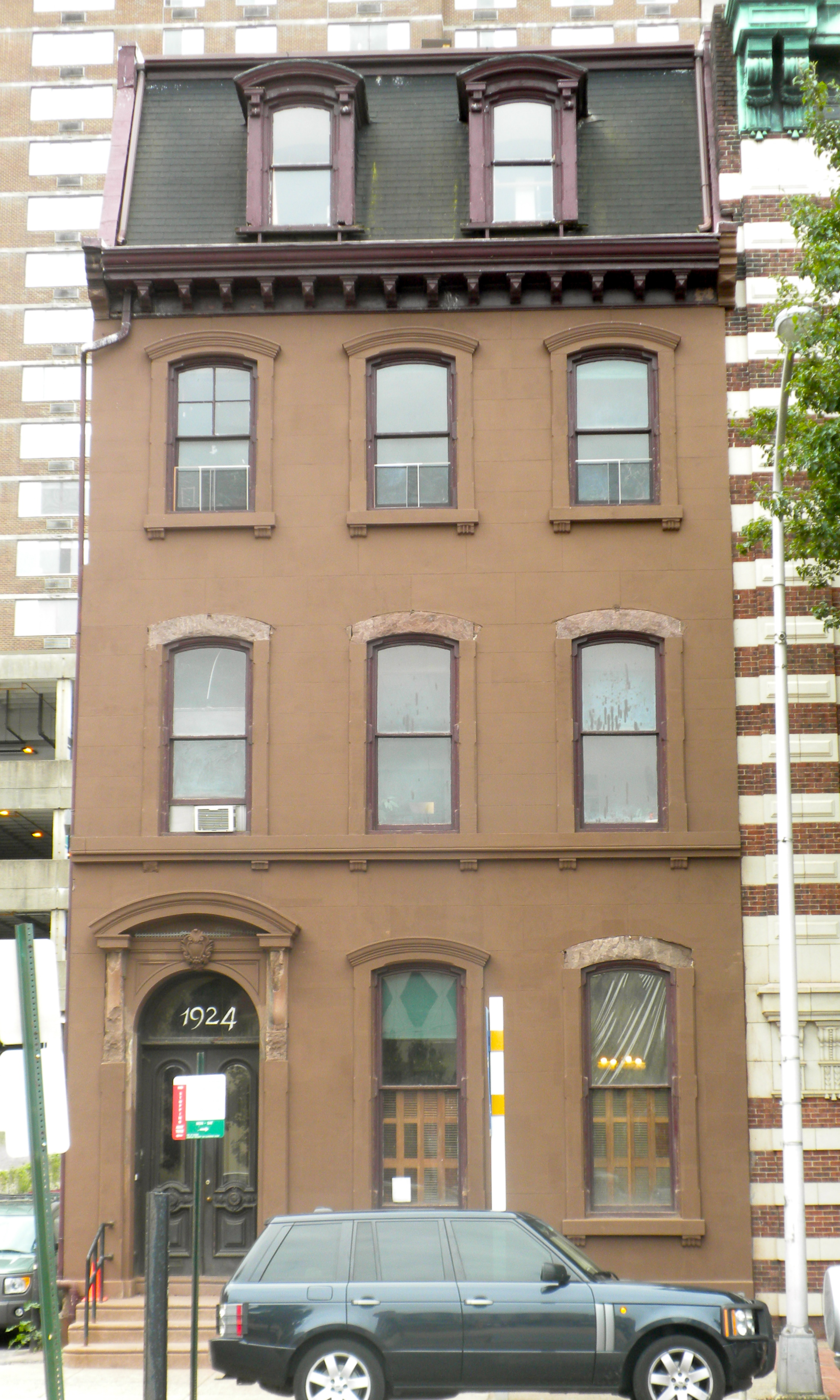
- Francis McIlvain House, August 2010

- Location within Philadelphia Location within Pennsylvania Location within the United States
- Location: 1924 Arch Street, Philadelphia, Pennsylvania
- Coordinates: 39.9553°N 75.1722°W
- Area: 0.1 acres (0.040 ha)
- Built: 1869
- Architectural style: Second Empire
- NRHP reference No.: 79002324
- Added to NRHP: November 20, 1979

The Francis McIlvain House was a historic home, built in 1869, in the Logan Square neighborhood of Philadelphia. A 3 1/2-story brick rowhouse faced with ashlar brownstone, it had a mansard roof in the Second Empire style.

The Francis McIlvain House was added to the National Register of Historic Places in 1979.

== History ==
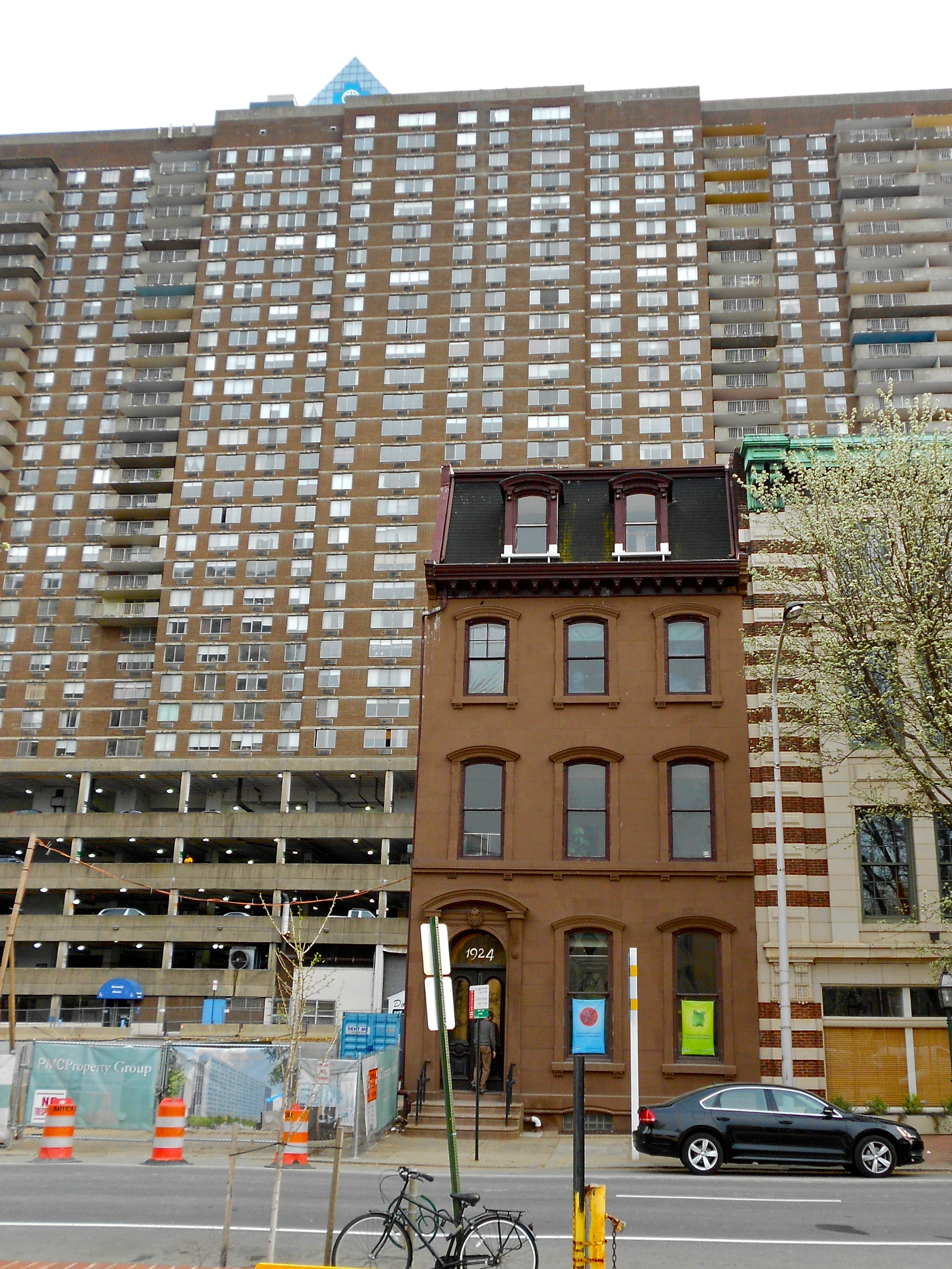
In April 2013

The house was a 3 1/2-story brick rowhouse faced with ashlar brownstone. It had a mansard roof in the Second Empire style.

The Francis McIlvain House was demolished in 2014.
