= The Wildlife Society =

International wildlife conservation non-profit

- Abbreviation: TWS
- Formation: 1937; 89 years ago
- Type: Nonprofit, scientific and educational association
- Tax ID no.: 52-0788946
- Legal status: 501(c)(3)
- Headquarters: Bethesda, Maryland
- Members: 11,000
- President: Art Rodgers
- Chief Executive Director: Ed Arnett, PhD, CWB
- Website: wildlife.org

The Wildlife Society (TWS) is an international non-profit association involved in wildlife stewardship through science and education. The Wildlife Society works to improve wildlife conservation in North America by advancing the science of wildlife management, promoting continuing education of wildlife professionals, and advocating for sound, science-based wildlife policy. The organization also encourages professional growth through certification, peer-reviewed publications, conferences, and working groups.

Society members are dedicated to sustainable management of wildlife resources and their habitats. Ecology is the primary scientific discipline of the wildlife profession. Therefore, the interests of the Society embrace the interactions of all organisms with their natural environments. The Society supports the belief that wildlife, in its myriad forms, is basic to the maintenance of a human culture that provides quality living.

== Overview ==
The Wildlife Society, initially known as The Society of Wildlife Specialists, was launched at the North American Wildlife Conference in Washington, D.C., in 1936. A year later, in St. Louis, Missouri, the Specialists became The Wildlife Society. A constitution and bylaws were adopted in 1937, and the Society was incorporated on March 25, 1948.

Over time, The Wildlife Society has broadened its programs beyond its original focus on scientific publications to include education and certification of wildlife biologists and advocacy.

== Publications ==
The society publishes three scientific journals: Journal of Wildlife Management, Wildlife Society Bulletin, and Wildlife Monographs. In addition to these scholarly journals, the Society publishes The Wildlife Professional, a popular magazine for members. Other important publications include technical reviews featuring analyses of current issues in wildlife conservation that are written by expert panels.

== Awards ==
In 1950 the Society created the annual Aldo Leopold Award.
