= Wildlife Society Bulletin =

- Discipline: Zoology
- Language: English
- Edited by: David Haukos

Publication details
- History: 1973-present
- Publisher: John Wiley & Sons (United States)
- Frequency: Quarterly
- Impact factor: 0.967 (2016)

Standard abbreviations
- ISO 4: Wildl. Soc. Bull.

Indexing
- ISSN: 1938-5463

Links
- Journal homepage

The Wildlife Society Bulletin is a peer-reviewed scientific journal devoted to the ecology of non-domesticated animal species. It is published by John Wiley & Sons on behalf of The Wildlife Society.

== See also ==
- Journal of Wildlife Management
- Wildlife Monographs
