= Steve Freudenthal =

American politician

Chair of the Wyoming Democratic Party
- In office 1999–2001

Member of the Wyoming House of Representatives from the Laramie County district
- In office 1987–1991
- Preceded by: Ellen Crowley-Suyematsu
- Succeeded by: Edith Garcia

28th Attorney General of Wyoming
- In office 1981–1983
- Governor: Ed Herschler
- Preceded by: John D. Troughton
- Succeeded by: Arch McClintock

Personal details
- Born: June 8, 1949 (age 77) Thermopolis, Wyoming
- Party: Democratic
- Education: Trinity College (B.A.); Vanderbilt University (J.D.)

Steven F. Freudenthal (born June 8, 1949) is a Democratic politician who served as the 28th Attorney General of Wyoming from 1981 until 1983.

== Career ==
After graduating from Vanderbilt University, Freudenthal served as an Assistant Attorney General for Wyoming from 1975 until 1977. In 1981, Governor Ed Herschler tapped Freudenthal, who had once been his law partner, to succeed John Troughton as Attorney General of Wyoming. Freudenthal served as Attorney General until 1983.

In 1986, Freudenthal was elected to the Wyoming House of Representatives to represent Laramie County. He served two terms before retiring in 1991. In 1999, Freudenthal was chosen by Wyoming Democrats to serve as the state chair of the Wyoming Democratic Party. Freudenthal served until 2001.

Freudenthal is currently of counsel at Pence and MacMillan in Cheyenne. He is also a partner with Freudenthal and Bonds P.C. in Cheyenne.

== Personal life ==
Freudenthal is the older brother of former Wyoming Governor Dave Freudenthal.

Legal offices
Preceded by John D. Troughton	Attorney General of Wyoming; 1983 – 1987	Succeeded by A.G. McClintock
