= Shirley J. Humphrey =

Wyoming politician

Member of the Wyoming House of Representatives from the Laramie district
- In office 1983–1992

Personal details
- Born: Shirley Joy Reed; May 26, 1937 Fort Morgan, Colorado, US
- Died: July 17, 2018 (aged 81) Cheyenne, Wyoming, US
- Education: University of Wyoming

Shirley J. Humphrey (May 26, 1937 – July 17, 2018) was an American Democratic politician from Cheyenne, Wyoming. She represented the Laramie district in the Wyoming House of Representatives from 1983 to 1992.
