= Lynn Birleffi =

American politician

Member of the Wyoming House of Representatives
- In office 1985–1988

Personal details
- Born: July 28, 1944 (age 82) Fort Huachuca, Arizona, U.S.
- Party: Democratic
- Education: University of Wyoming; University of New Mexico

Lynn Birleffi (born July 28, 1944) is an American politician. She served in the Wyoming House of Representatives from 1985 to 1988.

== Life and career ==
Birleffi was born in Fort Huachuca, Arizona. She attended Cheyenne East High School, the University of Wyoming and the University of New Mexico.

Birleffi was a marketing officer.

Birleffi served in the Wyoming House of Representatives from 1985 to 1988. She was a member of the Democratic Party.
