= Bill McIlvain =

American politician (born 1932)

Member of the Wyoming House of Representatives
- In office 1969–1973
- In office 1977–1990

Personal details
- Born: August 28, 1932 (age 93) Alma, Oklahoma, U.S.
- Party: Republican
- Occupation: college instructor

Bill McIlvain (born August 28, 1932) is an American politician in the state of Wyoming. He served in the Wyoming House of Representatives as a member of the Republican Party.

He served as Speaker of the Wyoming House of Representatives from 1989 to 1991. He attended the University of Wyoming and John Brown University and is a former college instructor.
