= 2018 Wyoming elections =

A general election was held in the U.S. state of Wyoming on November 6, 2018. All of Wyoming's executive offices were up for election, as well as a United States Senate seat and Wyoming's at-large seat in the United States House of Representatives. Primary elections were held on August 21, 2018.

== Governor ==
2018 Wyoming gubernatorial election
- November 6, 2018
- Turnout: 73.45% Registered ▲10.08% 41.16% of Total Population ▲7.16%
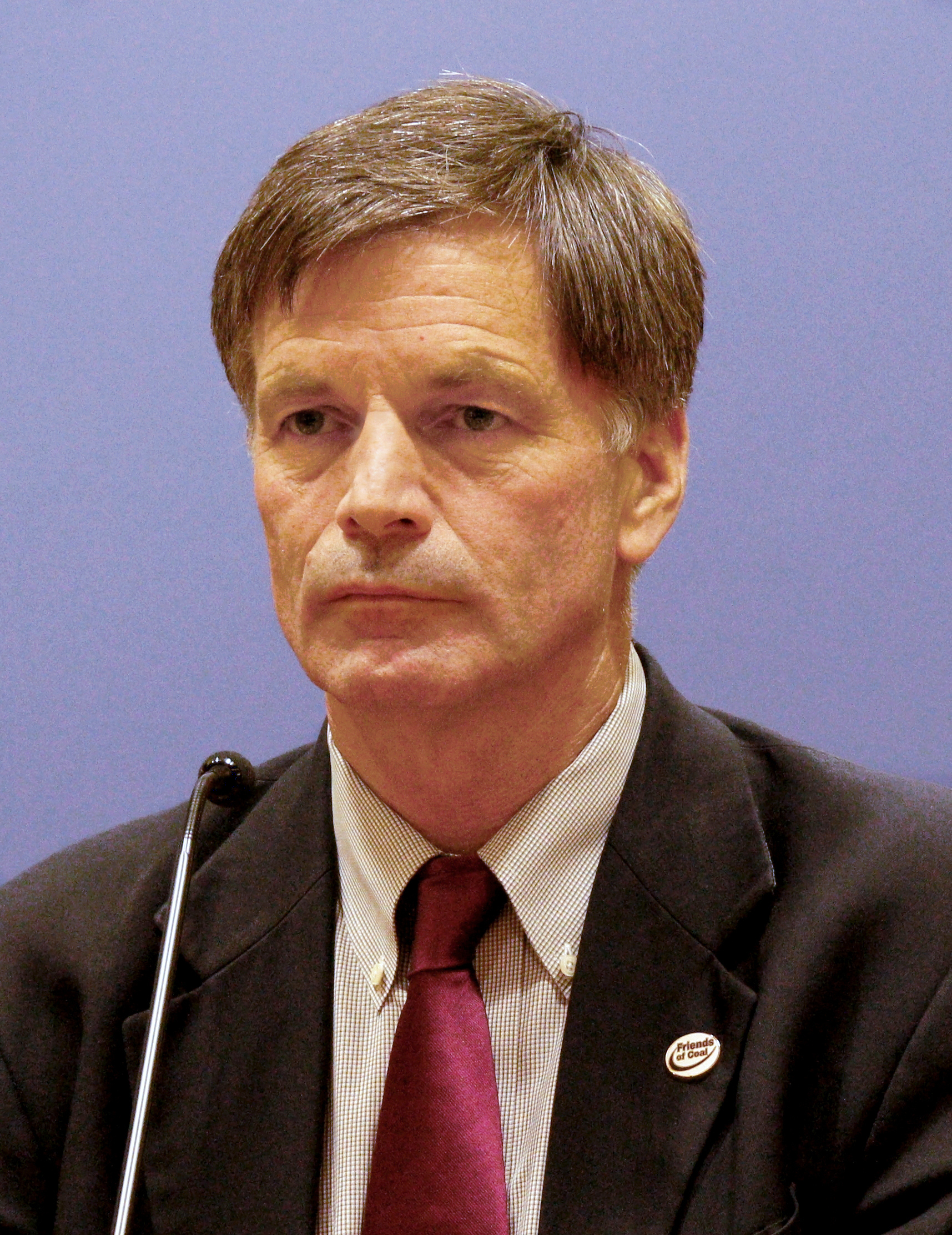

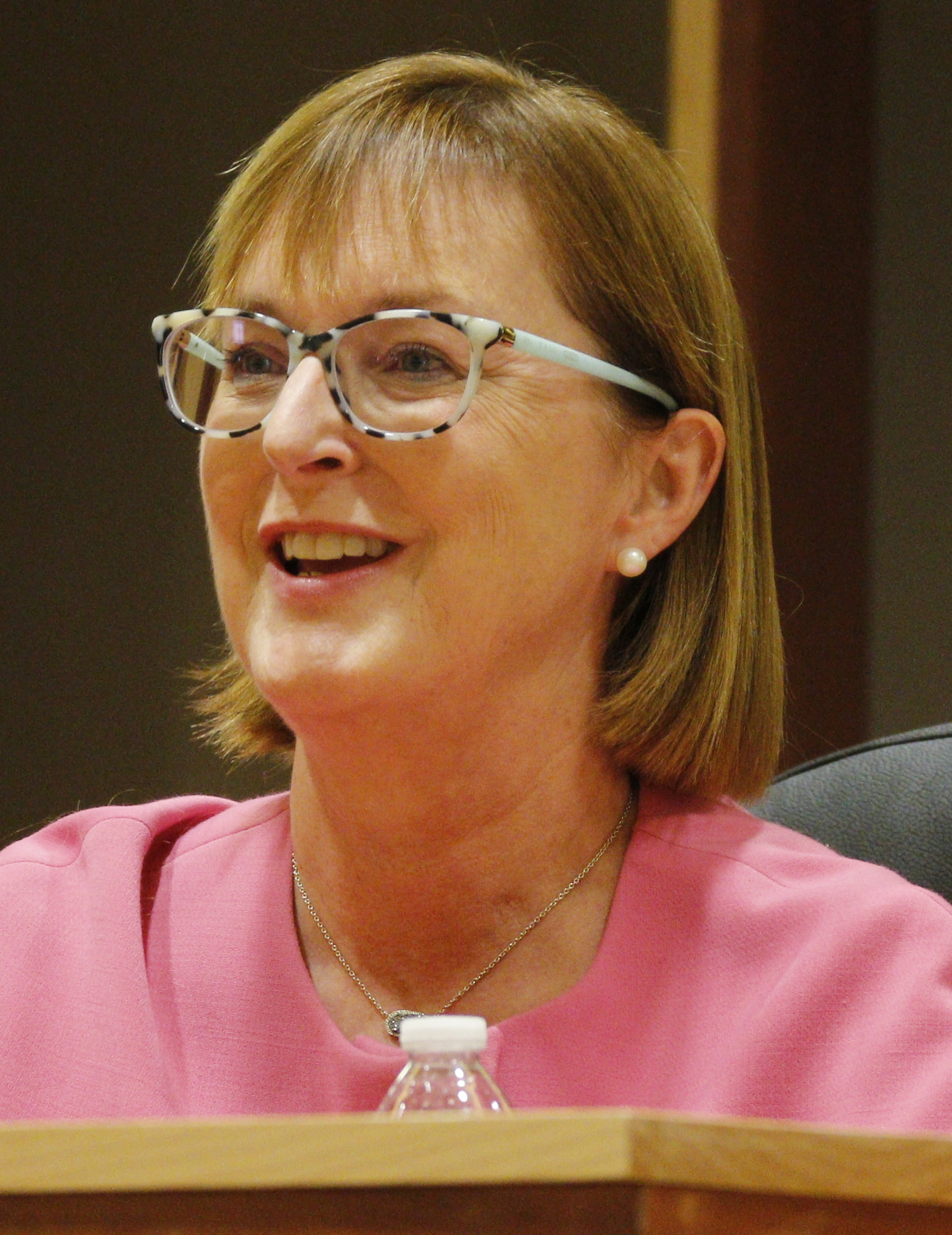
Nominee	Mark Gordon	Mary Throne
Party	Republican	Democratic
Popular vote	136,412	55,965
Percentage	67.1%	27.5%
- County results Gordon: 60–70% 70–80% 80–90% Throne: 40–50% 50–60%
Governor before election
Matt Mead
Republican
Elected Governor
Mark Gordon
Republican

Incumbent Republican Governor Matt Mead was term-limited and could not run for a third term. Republican State Treasurer Mark Gordon defeated attorney Harriet Hageman, businessmen Bill Dahlin, Foster Friess, Sam Galeotos, and physician Taylor Haynes.

Former Democratic Minority Leader of the Wyoming House of Representatives Mary Throne ran for the Democratic nomination with minimal opposition.

=== Results ===
Wyoming gubernatorial election, 2018
Party	Candidate	Votes	%
Republican	Mark Gordon	136,339	67.4
Democratic	Mary Throne	55,984	27.7
Constitution	Rex Rammell	6,739	3.3
Libertarian	Lawrence Struempf	3,114	1.5
Total votes		202,176	100

== Secretary of State ==
2018 Wyoming Secretary of State election
- November 6, 2018
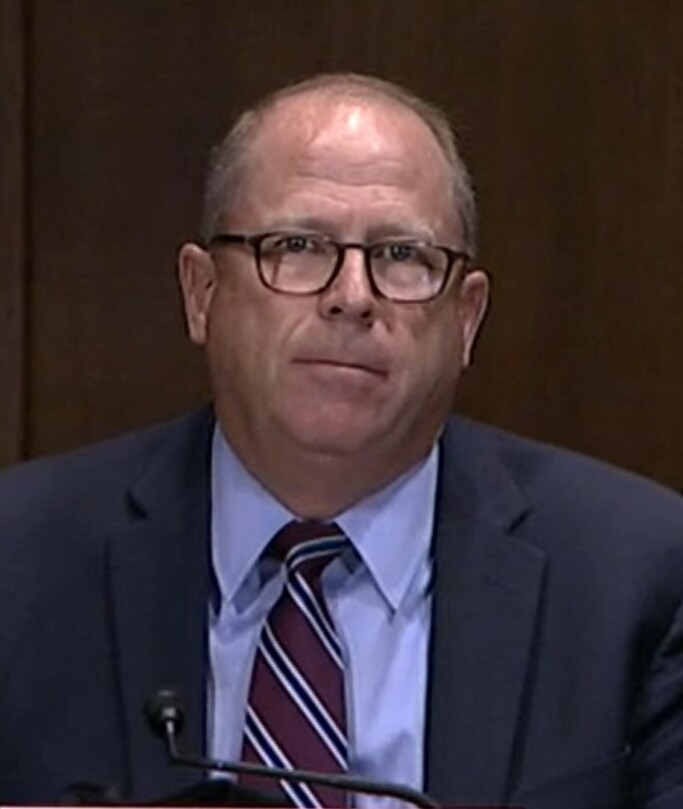

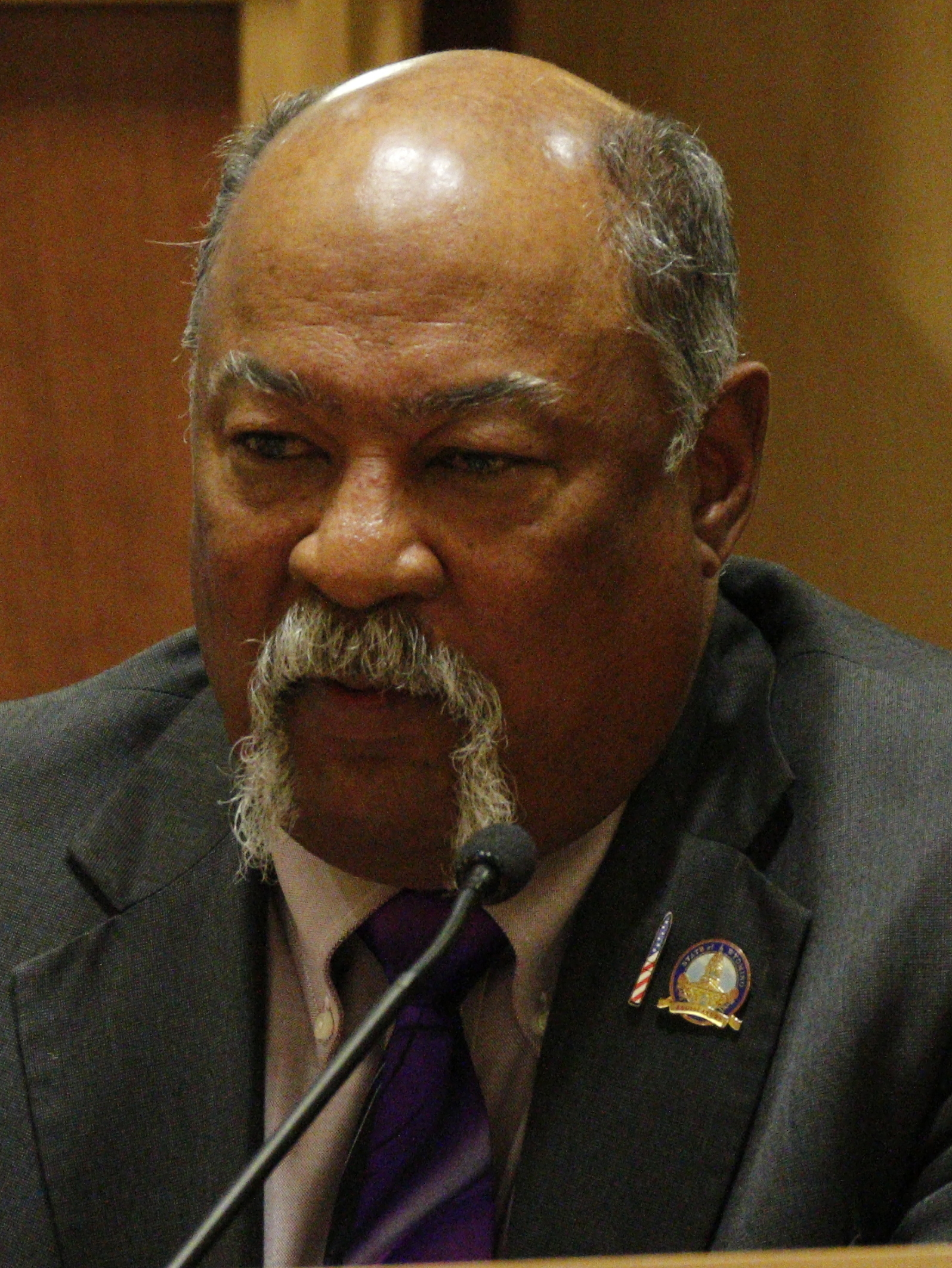
Nominee	Edward Buchanan	James W. Byrd
Party	Republican	Democratic
Popular vote	136,939	53,384
Percentage	68.8%	26.8%
- Buchanan: 40–50% 60–70% 70–80% 80–90% >90% Byrd: 40–50% 50–60% 60–70% 70–80% Tie: 40–50%
Secretary of State before election
Edward Buchanan
Republican
Elected Secretary of State
Edward Buchanan
Republican

Ed Murray, who had first been elected in 2014, intended to run for governor, but resigned February 9, 2018 following claims of sexual assault. Governor Matt Mead appointed former Speaker of the Wyoming House of Representatives Edward Buchanan to fill the remainder of Murray's term.

=== Republican primary ===
==== Candidates ====
- Edward Buchanan, incumbent Secretary of State of Wyoming and former Speaker of the Wyoming House of Representatives

==== Withdrew ====
- Leland Christensen, state senator and candidate for the U.S. House of Representatives in 2016 (running for State Treasurer)

Republican primary results
Party	Candidate	Votes	%
Republican	Edward Buchanan (incumbent)	94,603	80.1
Republican	Under votes	22,691	19.9
Republican	Write-ins	793	0.0
Republican	Over votes	7	0.0
Total votes		118,101	100.0

=== Democratic primary ===
==== Candidates ====
- James W. Byrd, state representative

Democratic primary results
Party	Candidate	Votes	%
Democratic	James W. Byrd	16,754	86.4
Democratic	Under votes	2,646	13.6
Democratic	Write-ins	73	0.0
Democratic	Over votes	1	0.0
Total votes		19,474	100.0

=== General election ===
==== Predictions ====
Source	Ranking	As of
Governing magazine	Safe R	June 4, 2018

==== Results ====
Wyoming Secretary of State election, 2018
Party	Candidate	Votes	%
Republican	Edward Buchanan (incumbent)	136,939	68.8
Democratic	James W. Byrd	53,384	26.8
Libertarian	Kit Carson	8,604	4.3
Total votes		198,927	100

== State Treasurer ==
2018 Wyoming State Treasurer election
- November 6, 2018
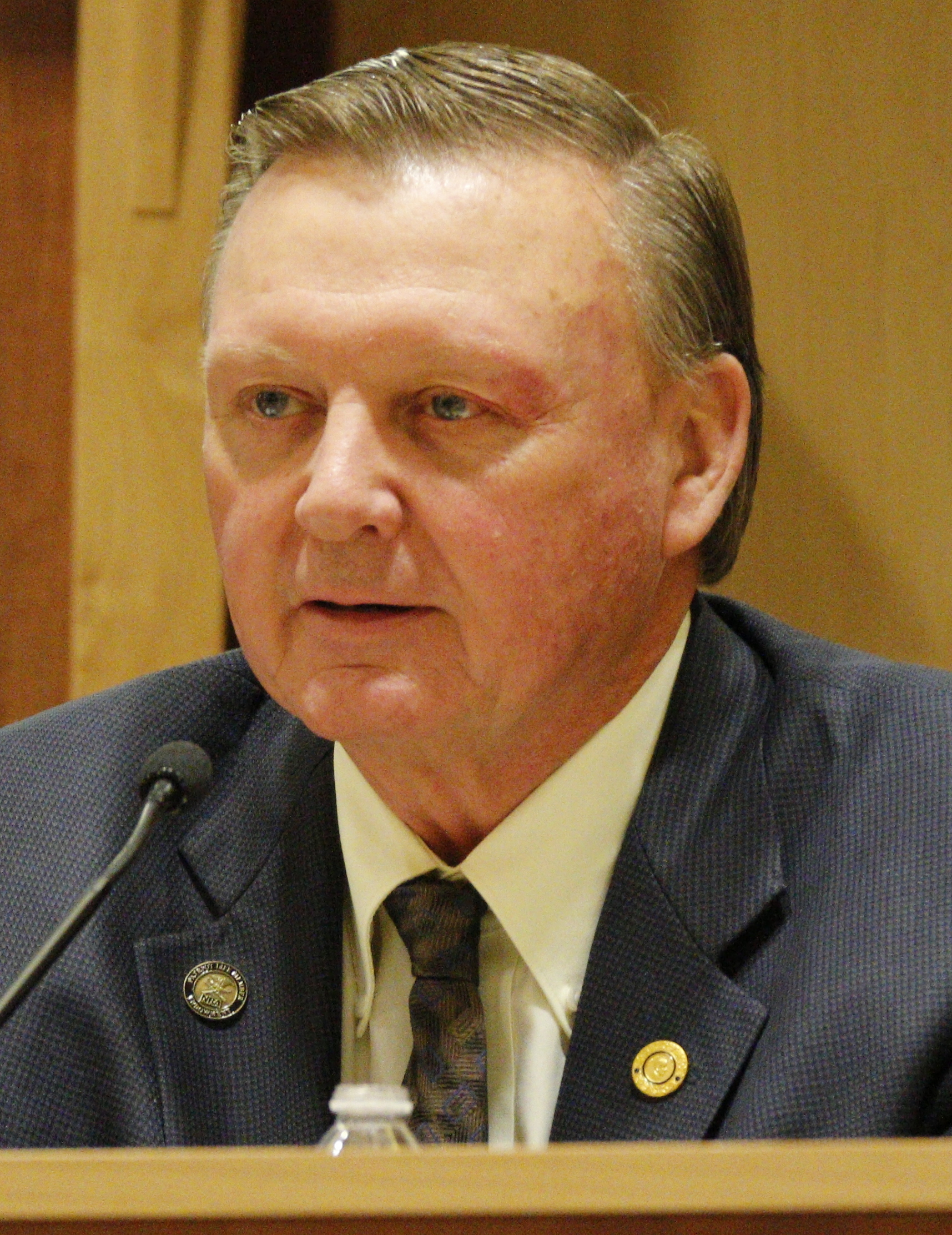

Nominee	Curt Meier	Chris Lowry
Party	Republican	Democratic
Popular vote	141,732	54,894
Percentage	72.1%	27.9%
- Meier: 50–60% 60–70% 70–80% 80–90% Lowry: 60–70%
Treasurer before election
Mark Gordon
Republican
Elected Treasurer
Curt Meier
Republican

Incumbent Republican State Treasurer Mark Gordon declined to run for a third full term and instead ran successfully for governor of Wyoming.

=== Republican primary ===
==== Candidates ====
- Leland Christensen, state senator and candidate for the U.S. House of Representatives in 2016
- Curt Meier, state senator
- Ron Redo, candidate for State Treasurer in 2014

Republican primary results
Party	Candidate	Votes	%
Republican	Curt Meier	51,338	43.5
Republican	Leland Christensen	46,070	39.0
Republican	Under votes	15,646	13.1
Republican	Ron Redo	4,779	4.0
Republican	Write-ins	247	0.0
Republican	Over votes	21	0.0
Total votes		118,101	100.0

=== Democratic primary ===
==== Candidates ====
No candidate filed to run; however, Chris Lowry qualified for the general election by receiving enough write-in votes.

=== Results ===
Wyoming State Treasurer election, 2018
Party	Candidate	Votes	%
Republican	Curt Meier	141,732	72.1
Democratic	Chris Lowry	54,894	27.9
Total votes		196,626	100

== State Auditor ==
2018 Wyoming State Auditor election
- November 6, 2018
Nominee	Kristi Racines	Jeff Dockter
Party	Republican	Democratic
Popular vote	143,887	52,488
Percentage	73.3%	26.7%
- Racines: 50–60% 60–70% 70–80% 80–90% Dockter: 50–60%
Auditor before election
Cynthia Cloud
Republican
Elected Auditor
Kristi Racines
Republican

Incumbent Republican State Auditor Cynthia Cloud declined to run for a third term.

=== Republican primary ===
==== Candidates ====
- Kristi Racines, certified public accountant
- Nathan Winters, state representative

Republican primary results
Party	Candidate	Votes	%
Republican	Kristi Racines	59,529	50.4
Republican	Nathan Winters	39,873	33.8
Republican	Under votes	18,481	15.7
Republican	Write-ins	201	0.0
Republican	Over votes	17	0.0
Total votes		118,101	100.0

=== Democratic primary ===
==== Candidates ====
- Jeff Dockter, Wyoming Department of Enterprise Technology Services supervisor

Democratic primary results
Party	Candidate	Votes	%
Democratic	Jeff Dockter	16,330	83.9
Democratic	Under votes	3,072	15.8
Democratic	Write-ins	72	0.0
Democratic	Over votes	0	0.0
Total votes		19,474	100.0

=== Results ===
Wyoming State Auditor election, 2018
Party	Candidate	Votes	%
Republican	Kristi Racines	143,887	73.3
Democratic	Jeff Dockter	52,488	26.7
Total votes		196,375	100

== Superintendent of Public Instruction ==
2018 Wyoming Superintendent of Public Instruction election
- November 6, 2018
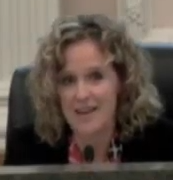
Nominee	Jillian Balow
Party	Republican
Popular vote	163,790
Percentage	98.1%
- Balow: 90–100%
Instruction before election
Jillian Balow
Republican
Elected Instruction
Jillian Balow
Republican

Incumbent Republican Superintendent Jillian Balow ran for a second term.

=== Republican primary ===
==== Candidates ====
- Jillian Balow, incumbent Superintendent of Public Instruction

Republican primary results
Party	Candidate	Votes	%
Republican	Jillian Balow	92,097	77.7
Republican	Under votes	25,108	22.3
Republican	Write-ins	885	0.0
Republican	Over votes	11	0.0
Total votes		118,101	100.0

=== Results ===
Wyoming Superintendent of Public Instruction election, 2018
Party	Candidate	Votes	%
Republican	Jillian Balow	163,790	98.1
Write-in		3,229	1.9
Total votes		167,019	100.0
Republican hold			

== United States Senate ==
Incumbent Republican Senator John Barrasso ran for a third term.

Businessman and nominee for the U.S. House of Representatives in 2006 and 2008 Gary Trauner ran for the Democratic nomination.

Businessman Dave Dodson initially ran as an independent, but later ran in the Republican primary and was defeated.

== United States House of Representatives ==
Incumbent Republican U.S. Representative Liz Cheney, who had represented the state in the United States House of Representatives since 2017, successfully ran for reelection. She defeated Rod Miller, a former federal land planning coordinator, and Blake Stanley for the Republican nomination.

Oil geologist Greg Hunter defeated attorney Travis Helm for the Democratic nomination.

== State Legislature ==
=== Wyoming Senate ===
Of the 30 seats in the Wyoming Senate, 15 were up for election in 2018.

District	Representative	Party	Results	Candidates
1	Ogden Driskill	Republican	Incumbent re-elected	Ogden Driskill (R)
3	Curt Meier	Republican	Incumbent retired to run for State Treasurer; New member elected Republican hold	Marci Shaver (D); Cheri Steinmetz (R)
5	Fred Emerich	Republican	Incumbent lost renomination New member elected Republican hold	Lynn Hutchings (R)
7	Stephan Pappas	Republican	Incumbent re-elected	Stephan Pappas (R)
9	Chris Rothfuss	Democratic	Incumbent re-elected	Chris Rothfuss (D)
11	Larry S. Hicks	Republican	Incumbent re-elected	Larry S. Hicks (R); Lee Ann Stephenson (D)
13	John Hastert	Democratic	Incumbent lost re-election New member elected Republican gain	John Hastert (D); Tom James (R); Ted Barney (I)
15	Paul Barnard	Republican	Incumbent lost renomination New member elected Republican hold	Wendy Davis Schuler (R)
17	Leland Christensen	Republican	Incumbent retired to run for State Treasurer; New member elected Democratic gain	Mike Gierau (D); Kate Mead (R)
19	R. Ray Peterson	Republican	Incumbent lost renomination New member elected Republican hold	R.J. Kost (R)
21	Bruce Burns	Republican	Incumbent retired New member elected Republican hold	Bo Biteman (R); Hollis Hackman (D)
23	Jeff Wasserburger	Republican	Incumbent re-elected	Jeff Wasserburger (R)
25	Cale Case	Republican	Incumbent re-elected	Cale Case (R); Sergio Maldonado (D)
27	Bill Landen	Republican	Incumbent re-elected	Bill Landen (R)
29	Drew Perkins	Republican	Incumbent re-elected	Drew Perkins (R)

=== Wyoming House of Representatives ===
All 60 seats in the Wyoming House of Representatives were up for election in 2018.

District	Representative	Party	Results	Candidates
1	Tyler Lindholm	Rep	Incumbent re-elected	Tyler Lindholm (R)
2	Hans Hunt	Rep	Incumbent re-elected	Hans Hunt (R)
3	Eric Barlow	Rep	Incumbent re-elected	Eric Barlow (R)
4	Dan Kirkbride	Rep	Incumbent re-elected	Dan Kirkbride (R)
5	Cheri Steinmetz	Rep	Incumbent retired to run for State Senate; New member elected Republican hold	Joan Brinkley (D); Shelly Duncan (R)
6	Aaron Clausen	Rep	Incumbent re-elected	Aaron Clausen (R)
7	Sue Wilson	Rep	Incumbent re-elected	Sue Wilson (R)
8	Bob Nicholas	Rep	Incumbent re-elected	Mitch Guthrie (D); Bob Nicholas (R)
9	Landon Brown	Rep	Incumbent re-elected	Landon Brown (R)
10	John Eklund, Jr.	Rep	Incumbent re-elected	John Eklund, Jr. (R); Jenefer Pasqua (D)
11	Jared Olsen	Rep	Incumbent re-elected	Jared Olsen (R); Calob Taylor (D)
12	Clarence Styvar	Rep	Incumbent re-elected	Ryan Lindsey (D); Clarence Styvar (R)
13	Cathy Connolly	Dem	Incumbent re-elected	Cathy Connolly (D)
14	Dan Furphy	Rep	Incumbent re-elected	Dan Furphy (R); Lorraine Saulino-Klein (D)
15	Donald Burkhart	Rep	Incumbent re-elected	Donald Burkhart (R)
16	Mike Gierau	Dem	Incumbent retired to run for State Senate; New member elected Democratic hold	Barbara Allen (R); Mike Yin (D)
17	JoAnn Dayton-Selman	Dem	Incumbent re-elected	Traci Ciepiela (R); JoAnn Dayton-Selman (D)
18	Thomas Crank	Rep	Incumbent re-elected	Thomas Crank (R)
19	Danny Eyre	Rep	Incumbent re-elected	Danny Eyre (R)
20	Albert Sommers	Rep	Incumbent re-elected	Albert Sommers (R)
21	Evan Simpson	Rep	Incumbent re-elected	Evan Simpson (R)
22	Marti Halverson	Rep	Incumbent lost re-election New member elected Independent gain	Marti Halverson (R); Jim Roscoe (I)
23	Andy Schwartz	Dem	Incumbent re-elected	Alex Muromcew (R); Andy Schwartz (D)
24	Scott Court	Rep	Incumbent retired New member elected Republican hold	Paul Fees (D); Sandy Newsome (R)
25	Dan Laursen	Rep	Incumbent re-elected	Dan Laursen (R)
26	Jamie Flitner	Rep	Incumbent re-elected	Jamie Flitner (R)
27	Mike Greear	Rep	Incumbent re=elected	Mike Greear (R)
28	Nathan Winters	Rep	Incumbent retired to run for State Auditor; New member elected Republican hold	Howie Samelson (D); John Winter (R)
29	Mark Kinner	Rep	Incumbent re-elected	Mark Kinner (R)
30	Mark Jennings	Rep	Incumbent re-elected	Mark Jennings (R)
31	Scott Clem	Rep	Incumbent re-elected	Scott Clem (R); Dave Hardesty (I)
32	Timothy Hallinan	Rep	Incumbent re-elected	Timothy Hallinan (R); Chad Trebby (I)
33	Jim Allen	Rep	Incumbent lost re-election New member elected Democratic gain	Jim Allen (R); Andi Clifford (D)
34	Tim Salazar	Rep	Incumbent re-elected	Tim Salazar (R)
35	Joe MacGuire	Rep	Incumbent re-elected	Joe MacGuire (R)
36	Debbie Bovee	Dem	Incumbent lost re-election New member elected Republican gain	Debbie Bovee (D); Art Washut (R)
37	Steve Harshman	Rep	Incumbent re-elected	Steve Harshman (R)
38	Tom Walters	Rep	Incumbent re-elected	Tom Walters (R)
39	Stan Blake	Dem	Incumbent re-elected	Stan Blake (D)
40	Mike Madden	Rep	Incumbent retired New member elected Republican hold	Chris Schock (I); Richard Tass (R)
41	Bill Henderson	Rep	Incumbent re-elected	Sean Castaneda (D); Bill Henderson (R)
42	Jim Blackburn	Rep	Incumbent re-elected	Jim Blackburn (R); Juliet Daniels (D)
43	Dan Zwonitzer	Rep	Incumbent re-elected	Dan Zwonitzer (R)
44	James W. Byrd	Dem	Incumbent retired to run for Secretary of State; New member elected Democratic hold	Sara Burlingame (D); John Romero-Martinez (R)
45	Charles Pelkey	Dem	Incumbent re-elected	Roxie Jackson Hensley (R); Charles Pelkey (D)
46	Bill Haley	Rep	Incumbent re-elected	Jackie Grimes (D); Bill Haley (R)
47	Jerry Paxton	Rep	Incumbent re-elected	Jerry Paxton (R)
48	Clark Stith	Rep	Incumbent re-elected	Clark Stith (R)
49	Garry Piiparinen	Rep	Incumbent re-elected	Garry Piiparinen (R)
50	David Northrup	Rep	Incumbent re-elected	David Northrup (R); Mike Specht (D)
51	Bo Biteman	Rep	Incumbent retired to run for State Senate; New member elected Republican hold	Cyrus Western (R)
52	William Pownall	Rep	Incumbent re-elected	William Pownall (R)
53	Roy Edwards	Rep	Incumbent re-elected	Roy Edwards (R)
54	Lloyd Larsen	Rep	Incumbent re-elected	Mark Calhoun (D); Lloyd Larsen (R)
55	David Miller	Rep	Incumbent re-elected	Bethany Baldes (L); David Miller (R)
56	Jerry Obermueller	Rep	Incumbent re-elected	Jerry Obermueller (R)
57	Chuck Gray	Rep	Incumbent re-elected	Chuck Gray (R); Jane Ifland (D)
58	Pat Sweeney	Rep	Incumbent re-elected	Pat Sweeney (R)
59	Bunky Loucks	Rep	Incumbent re-elected	Laurie Longtine (D); Bunky Loucks (R)
60	John Freeman	Dem	Incumbent re-elected	John Freeman (D)
