= 2018 United States House of Representatives election in Wyoming =

2018 United States House of Representatives election in Wyoming's at-large district
- November 6, 2018
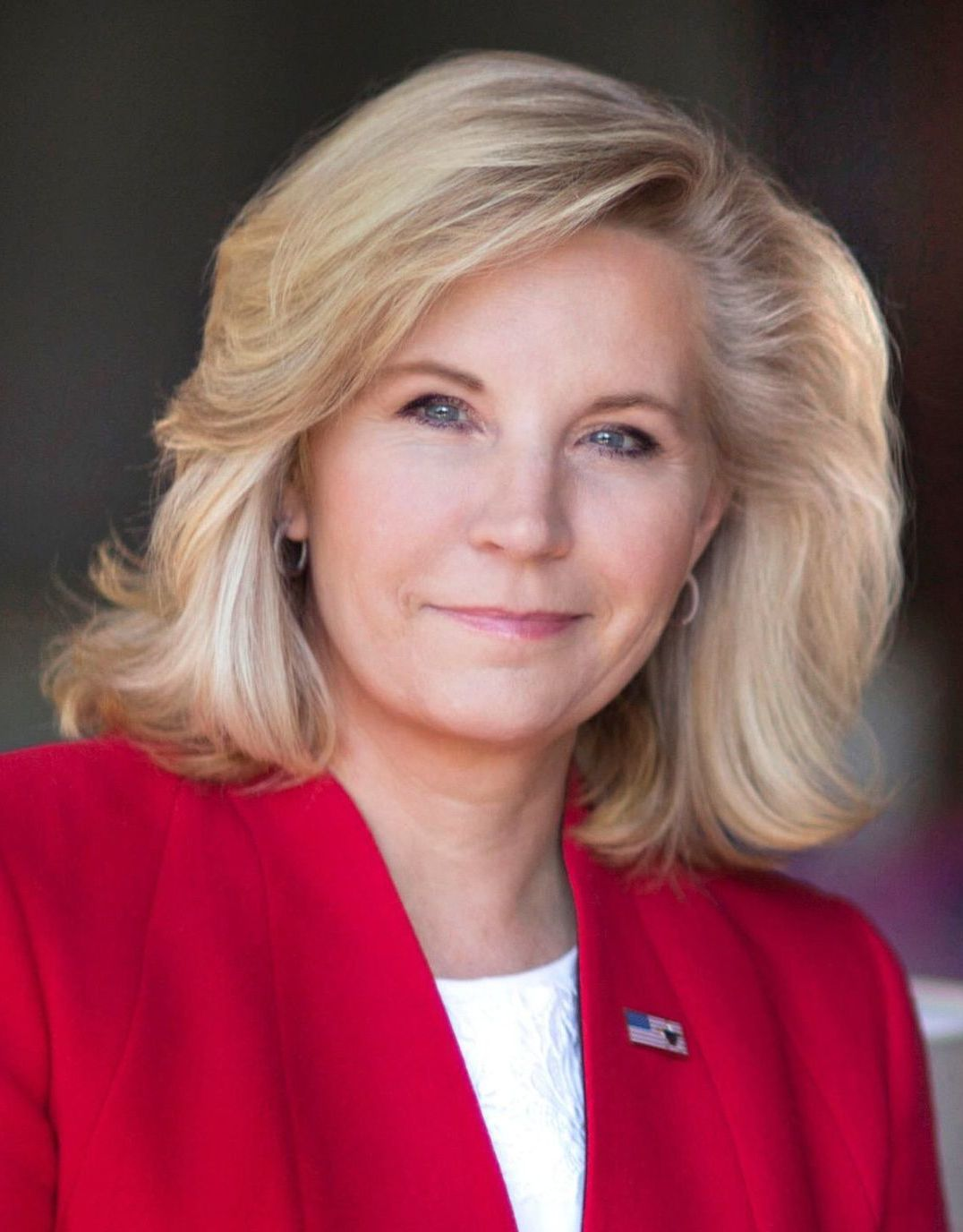

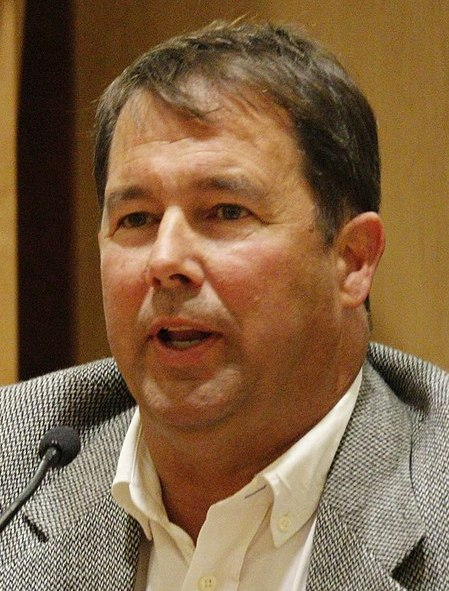
| Nominee | Liz Cheney | Greg Hunter |
| Party | Republican | Democratic |
| Popular vote | 127,963 | 59,903 |
| Percentage | 63.59% | 29.77% |
- Cheney: 40–50% 50–60% 60–70% 70–80% 80–90% >90% Hunter: 40–50% 50–60% 60–70% 70–80% Tie: 50% No votes
U.S. Representative before election
Liz Cheney
Republican
Elected U.S. Representative
Liz Cheney
Republican

The 2018 United States House of Representatives election in Wyoming was held on November 6, 2018, to elect the U.S. representative from Wyoming's at-large congressional district, who would represent the state of Wyoming in the 116th United States Congress. The election coincided with the 2018 U.S. mid-term elections, as well as other elections to the House of Representatives, elections to the United States Senate and various state and local elections.

Key 2018 races in Wyoming included elections for governor, secretary of state of Wyoming, U.S. Senate, 15 of the 30 seats in the Wyoming State Senate, and all 60 seats in the Wyoming House of Representatives.

Incumbent Republican Liz Cheney won reelection to a second term.

Primary elections to determine each party's nominee for the general election were held on August 21, 2018.

== Republican primary ==
=== Candidates ===
==== Declared ====
- Liz Cheney, incumbent U.S. representative
- Rod Miller, cowboy
- Blake E. Stanley

=== Results ===
Results by county: Cheney: 40–50%; 50–60%; 60–70%; 70–80%; 80–90%

Republican primary results
| Party | Candidate | Votes | % |
|---|---|---|---|
| Republican | Liz Cheney (incumbent) | 75,183 | 63.7 |
| Republican | Rod Miller | 22,045 | 18.7 |
| Republican | Blake E. Stanley | 13,307 | 11.3 |
| n/a | Under votes | 6,954 | 5.9 |
| Republican | Write-ins | 478 | 0.4 |
| n/a | Over votes | 134 | 0.1 |
| Total votes | | 118,101 | 100.0 |

== Democratic primary ==
=== Candidates ===
==== Declared ====
- Travis Helm, businessman, attorney, and University of Wyoming College of Law graduate
- Greg Hunter, former oil geologist

=== Results ===
Results by county: Hunter: 50–60%; 60–70%; Helm: 50–60%

Democratic primary results
| Party | Candidate | Votes | % |
|---|---|---|---|
| Democratic | Greg Hunter | 10,332 | 53.1 |
| Democratic | Travis Helm | 6,527 | 33.5 |
| n/a | Under votes | 2,476 | 12.7 |
| Democratic | Write-ins | 100 | 0.5 |
| n/a | Over votes | 39 | 0.2 |
| Total votes | | 19,474 | 100.0 |

== General election ==
=== Predictions ===
| Source | Ranking | As of |
|---|---|---|
| The Cook Political Report | Safe R | November 5, 2018 |
| Inside Elections | Safe R | November 5, 2018 |
| Sabato's Crystal Ball | Safe R | November 5, 2018 |
| RCP | Safe R | November 5, 2018 |
| Daily Kos | Safe R | November 5, 2018 |
| 538 | Safe R | November 7, 2018 |
| CNN | Safe R | October 31, 2018 |
| Politico | Safe R | November 4, 2018 |

=== Polling ===
| Poll source | Date(s) administered | Sample size | Margin of error | Liz Cheney (R) | Greg Hunter (D) | Richard Brubaker (L) | Daniel Cummings (C) | Undecided |
|---|---|---|---|---|---|---|---|---|
| Change Research (D) | November 2–4, 2018 | 858 | – | 55% | 28% | 7% | 6% | – |

=== Results ===
Wyoming's at-large congressional district, 2018
| Party | Candidate | Votes | % | ±% |
|---|---|---|---|---|
| Republican | Liz Cheney (incumbent) | 127,963 | 63.59% | +1.56% |
| Democratic | Greg Hunter | 59,903 | 29.77% | −0.20% |
| Libertarian | Richard Brubaker | 6,918 | 3.44% | −0.15% |
| Constitution | Daniel Clyde Cummings | 6,070 | 3.02% | −1.10% |
| n/a | Write-ins | 391 | 0.19% | −0.10% |
| Total votes | | 201,245 | 100.0% | N/A |
| Republican hold | | | | |

== See also ==
- United States House of Representatives elections, 2018
- United States elections, 2018
- United States Senate election in Wyoming, 2018
- Wyoming gubernatorial election, 2018
- Wyoming elections, 2018
