= 2018 Wyoming gubernatorial election =

- November 6, 2018
- Turnout: 73.45% registered ▲10.08% 41.16% of total population ▲7.16%
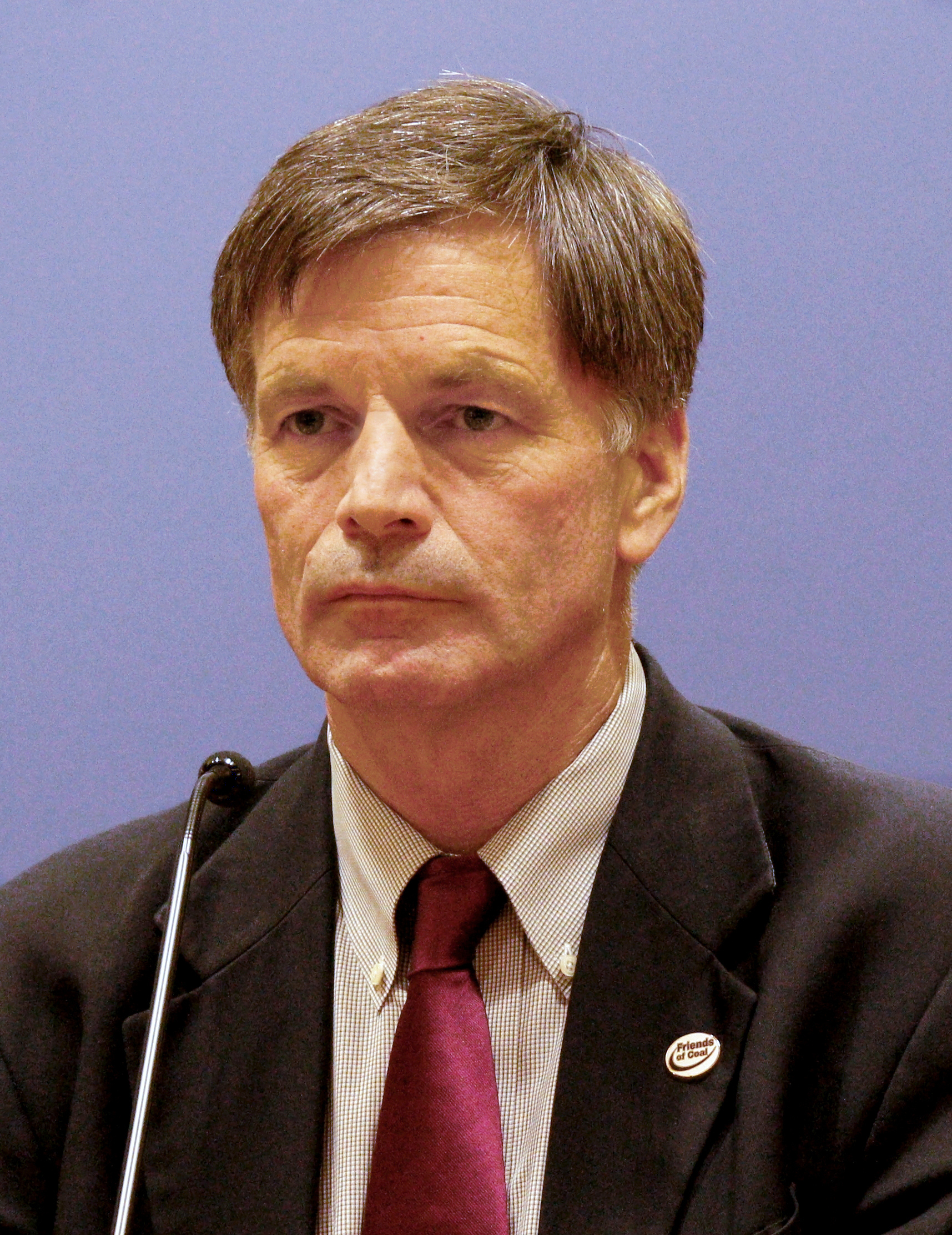

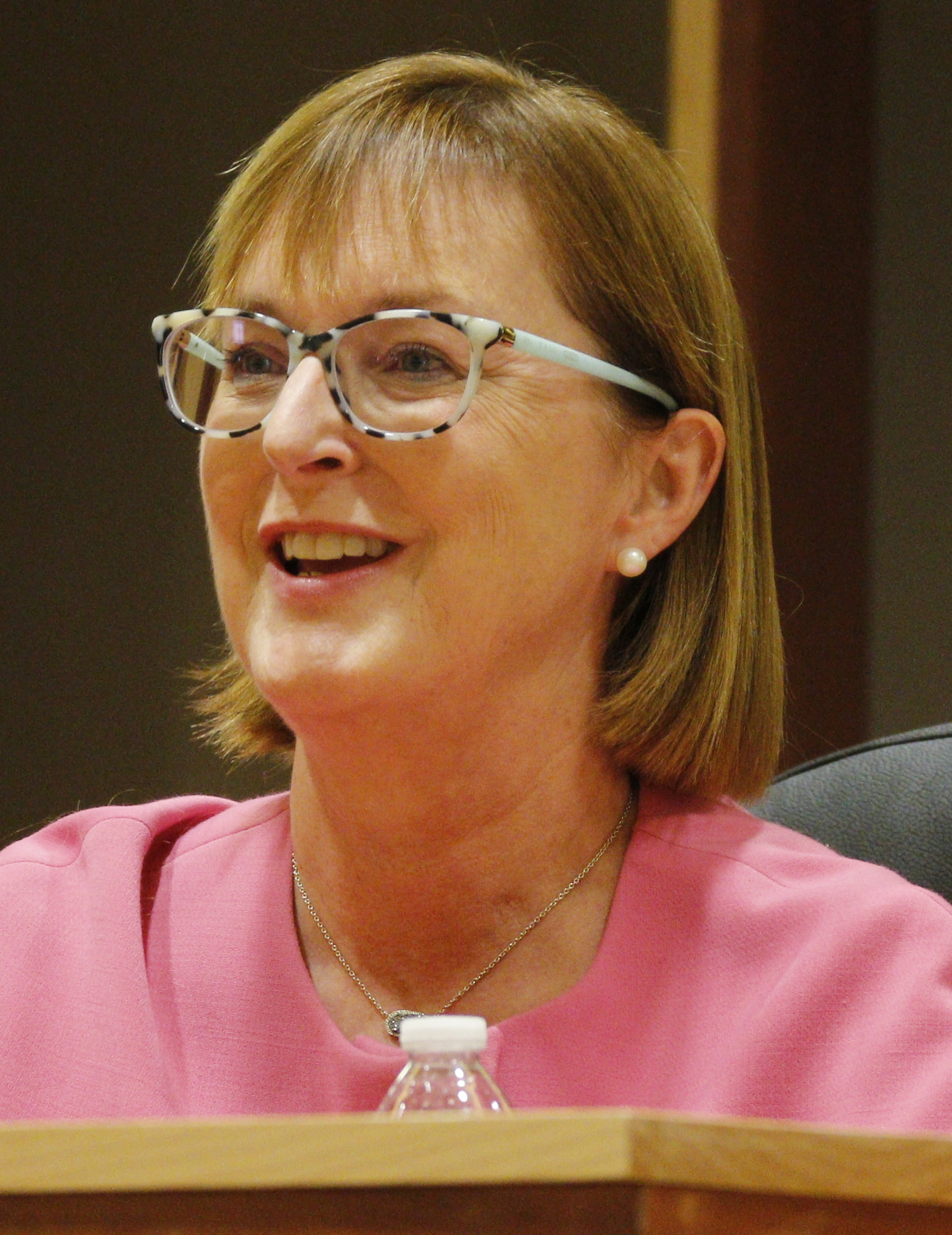
Nominee	Mark Gordon	Mary Throne
Party	Republican	Democratic
Popular vote	136,412	55,965
Percentage	67.12%	27.54%
- Gordon: 40–50% 50–60% 60–70% 70–80% 80–90% >90% Throne: 40–50% 50–60% 60–70% 70–80% No votes
Governor before election
Matt Mead
Republican
Elected Governor
Mark Gordon
Republican

The 2018 Wyoming gubernatorial election took place on November 6, 2018, to elect the governor of Wyoming. Incumbent Republican governor Matt Mead was term-limited and could not seek a third consecutive term. Republican nominee Mark Gordon defeated Democratic nominee Mary Throne by nearly 40 percentage points.

This was the only time since 1978 that a candidate from the president's party was elected governor of Wyoming.

== Republican primary ==
=== Candidates ===
==== Nominated ====
- Mark Gordon, Wyoming state treasurer

==== Declared ====
- Bill Dahlin, businessman
- Foster Friess, businessman and activist
- Sam Galeotos, businessman
- Harriet Hageman, attorney and former Liz Cheney campaign advisor
- Taylor Haynes, physician, write-in candidate for governor in 2010 and candidate for governor in 2014

==== Withdrew ====
- Rex Rammell, veterinarian and perennial candidate (ran for Constitution Party nomination)

=== Endorsements ===
Foster Friess

Federal officials

- Rand Paul, U.S. senator (R-KY)
- Rick Santorum, former U.S. senator (R-PA)
- Donald Trump, 45th president of the United States (2017–2021)

State legislators

- Mark Baker, former state representative

Individuals

- Kimberly Guilfoyle, television news personality
- Kyle Kashuv, school safety activist
- Charlie Kirk, founder and president of Turning Point USA
- Chuck Norris, martial artist, actor, film producer and screenwriter
- Donald Trump Jr., businessman and son of President Donald Trump

Organizations

- Family Research Council
- Tea Party Patriots
- Wyoming Right to Life
Sam Galeotos

Federal elected officials

- Cynthia Lummis, former U.S. representative (R-WY)

State legislators

- Amy Edmonds, former state representative
- Affie Ellis, state senator

Individuals

- Ray Hunkins, Republican nominee for governor in 2006
Mark Gordon

Federal elected officials

- Alan Simpson, former U.S. senator (R-WY)

State elected officials

- Cynthia Cloud, state auditor
- Max Maxfield, former secretary of state of Wyoming and former state auditor
- Diana Ohman, former secretary of state of Wyoming and former state superintendent of Public Instruction

State legislators

- Jim Anderson, state senator
- Rex Arney, former state representative
- Eric Barlow, state representative
- Rosie Berger, former majority leader of the Wyoming House of Representatives
- Gregg Blikre, former state representative
- Landon Brown, state representative
- Donald Burkhart, speaker pro tempore of the Wyoming House of Representatives
- Bruce Burns, state senator
- Johnnie Burton, former state representative
- Cale Case, state senator
- Aaron Clausen, state representative
- Hank Coe, state senator
- Stan Cooper, former state senator
- Jamie Flitner, state representative
- Mike Greear, state representative
- Elaine Harvey, former state representative
- Jerry Iekel, former state representative
- Pete Illoway, former state representative
- Wayne Johnson, former state senator
- Dan Kirkbride, state representative
- Lloyd Larsen, state representative
- Grant Larson, former state representative
- Clarene Law, former state representative
- Tyler Lindholm, state representative
- Tom Lubnau, former speaker of the Wyoming House of Representatives
- Mike Madden, state representative
- Larry Meuli, former state representative
- Frank Moore, former state representative
- Bob Nicholas, state representative
- David Northrup, state representative
- Jerry Obermueller, state representative
- Doug Osborne, former state representative
- Ruth Petroff, former state representative
- Doug Samuelson, former state representative
- Nels J. Smith, former speaker of the Wyoming House of Representatives
- Clark Stith, state representative
- Dan Sullivan, former state senator
- Pat Sweeney, state representative
- Michael Von Flatern, state senator
- Tom Walters, state representative
- Peter Wold, former state representative
- Dan Zwonitzer, state representative
- David Zwonitzer, former state representative

Individuals

- Susan Thomas, wife of late Senator Craig Thomas (R-WY)
- Isabel Wallop, wife of late Senator Malcolm Wallop (R-WY)

Organizations

- National Federation of Independent Business
Harriet Hageman

State legislators

- Scott Clem, state representative
- Mark Jennings, state representative
- Charles Scott, state senator
- Cheri Steinmetz, state representative

=== Polling ===
Poll source	Date(s) administered	Sample size	Margin of error	Foster Friess	Sam Galeotos	Mark Gordon	Harriet Hageman	Taylor Haynes	Other	Undecided
University of Wyoming	August 17–19, 2018	357	–	20%	10%	26%	18%	9%	1%	15%
The Trafalgar Group (R)	August 11–14, 2018	1,775	± 2.4%	21%	10%	20%	16%	6%	8%	20%
University of Wyoming	June 18–20, 2018	596	± 4.0%	6%	14%	19%	11%	10%	1%	35%

=== Results ===
Results by county: Gordon—50–60% Gordon—40–50% Gordon—30–40% Gordon—<30% Friess—<30% Friess—30–40% Hageman—<30% Hageman—30–40% Hageman—40–50%

Republican primary results
Party	Candidate	Votes	%
Republican	Mark Gordon	38,951	33.0
Republican	Foster Friess	29,842	25.3
Republican	Harriet Hageman	25,052	21.2
Republican	Sam Galeotos	14,554	12.3
Republican	Taylor Haynes	6,511	5.5
Republican	Bill Dahlin	1,763	1.5
n/a	Under votes	1,269	1.1
Republican	Write-ins	113	0.0
n/a	Over votes	46	0.0
Total votes		118,101	100.0

== Democratic primary ==
=== Candidates ===
==== Nominated ====
- Mary Throne, former minority leader of the Wyoming House of Representatives

==== Declared ====
- Ken Casner, candidate for governor in 2002
- Michael Allen Green, nominee for the U.S. House of Representatives in 2000
- Rex Wilde, candidate for governor in 2010

==== Declined ====
- James W. Byrd, state representative (ran for secretary of state)
- Ryan Greene, nominee for the U.S. House of Representatives in 2016 (ran for mayor of Rock Springs)
- Chris Rothfuss, minority leader of the Wyoming Senate and nominee for U.S. Senate in 2008
- Milward Simpson, director of the Wyoming Nature Conservancy
- Gary Trauner, businessman and nominee for U.S. House of Representatives in 2006 and 2008 (ran for U.S. Senate)

=== Endorsements ===
Mary Throne

Federal executive officers

- Julian Castro, former United States Secretary of Housing and Urban Development and former mayor of San Antonio, Texas

State executive officers

- Kathy Karpan, former Wyoming Secretary of State, 1994 Democratic nominee for Governor, and 1996 Democratic nominee for U.S. Senate

State legislators

- Mike Gierau, state representative
- Chris Rothfuss, minority leader of the Wyoming Senate
- Andy Schwartz, state representative

Individuals

- Mickey Babcock, Wyoming activist and founder/director of the Equipoise Fund
- Ryan Greene, author, businessman, and nominee for the U.S. House of Representatives in 2016

Organizations

- Greater Cheyenne Chamber of Commerce
- Wyoming Education Association

Newspapers

- Wyoming Tribune Eagle

=== Results ===
Results by county: Throne—80–90% Throne—70–80% Throne—60–70% Throne—50–60%

Democratic primary results
Party	Candidate	Votes	%
Democratic	Mary Throne	12,948	66.5
Democratic	Michael Green	2,391	12.3
n/a	Under votes	1,385	7.1
Democratic	Kenneth Casner	1,213	6.2
Democratic	Rex Wilde	1,201	6.2
Democratic	Write-ins	323	1.7
n/a	Over votes	13	0.0
Total votes		19,474	100.0

== Independents and third parties ==
=== Candidates ===
==== Declared ====
- Rex Rammell, veterinarian and perennial candidate (Constitution)

== General election ==
=== Debates ===
- Complete video of debate, October 6, 2018
- Complete video of debate, October 18, 2018

=== Predictions ===
Source	Ranking	As of
The Cook Political Report	Safe R	October 26, 2018
The Washington Post	Safe R	November 5, 2018
FiveThirtyEight	Safe R	November 5, 2018
Rothenberg Political Report	Safe R	November 1, 2018
Sabato's Crystal Ball	Safe R	November 5, 2018
RealClearPolitics	Safe R	November 4, 2018
Daily Kos	Safe R	November 5, 2018
Fox News (Note: The Fox News Midterm Power Rankings uniquely does not contain a category for Safe/Solid races)	Likely R	November 5, 2018
Politico	Safe R	November 5, 2018
Governing	Safe R	November 5, 2018

=== Polling ===
Poll source	Date(s) administered	Sample size	Margin of error	Mark Gordon (R)	Mary Throne (D)	Rex Rammell (C)	Lawrence Struempf (L)	Undecided
Change Research	November 2–4, 2018	858	–	61%	27%	6%	4%	–

=== Results ===
State senate results

2018 Wyoming gubernatorial election
Party	Candidate	Votes	%	±%
Republican	Mark Gordon	136,412	67.12%	+7.73%
Democratic	Mary Throne	55,965	27.54%	+0.29%
Constitution	Rex Rammell	6,751	3.32%	N/A
Libertarian	Lawrence Struempf	3,010	1.48%	−0.93%
Write-in		1,100	0.54%	-4.52%
Total votes		203,238	100.00%	N/A
Republican hold				

==== By county ====
Vote breakdown by county
	Mark Gordon Republican		Mary Throne Democrat		All Others	
County	Votes	%	Votes	%	Votes	%
Albany	6,494	45.1%	7,137	49.5%	780	5.4%
Big Horn	3,391	78.6%	608	14.1%	315	7.3%
Campbell	10,398	79.9%	1,856	14.3%	756	5.8%
Carbon	3,560	68.9%	1,314	25.4%	292	5.7%
Converse	3,872	78.4%	757	15.3%	310	6.2%
Crook	2,575	83.4%	358	11.6%	155	5.0%
Fremont	9,251	64.4%	4,299	29.9%	808	5.6%
Goshen	3,568	74.3%	957	19.9%	280	5.8%
Hot Springs	1,682	74.7%	443	19.7%	126	5.6%
Johnson	3,245	83.6%	478	12.3%	158	4.1%
Laramie	20,052	61.3%	11,196	34.2%	1,454	4.4%
Lincoln	5,511	76.8%	1,155	16.1%	506	7.1%
Natrona	16,866	68.9%	6,352	25.9%	1,262	5.2%
Niobrara	918	79.1%	153	13.2%	89	7.8%
Park	8,815	74.6%	2,277	19.3%	717	6.1%
Platte	2,644	70.0%	845	22.4%	287	7.7%
Sheridan	8,727	73.9%	2,667	22.6%	420	3.6%
Sublette	2,664	78.3%	602	17.7%	136	4.0%
Sweetwater	8,375	64.8%	3,758	29.1%	800	6.2%
Teton	4,736	40.5%	6,541	56.0%	411	3.6%
Uinta	4,547	72.6%	1,296	20.7%	420	6.7%
Washakie	2,396	77.0%	568	18.3%	148	4.8%
Weston	2,125	78.6%	348	12.9%	231	8.6%

Counties that flipped from Republican to Democratic

- Teton (largest city: Jackson)
