= 2018 United States Senate election in Wyoming =

- November 6, 2018
- Turnout: 77.43% ▲
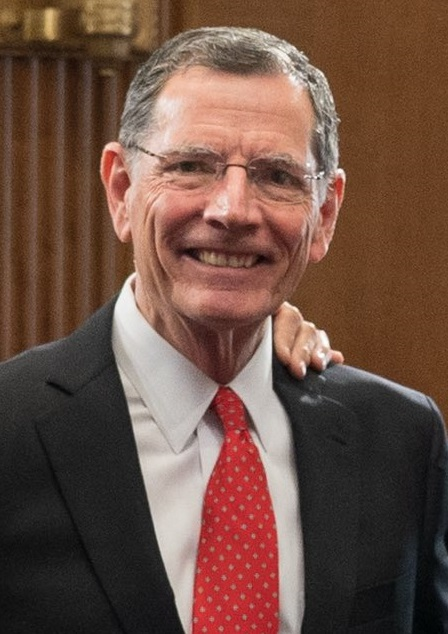

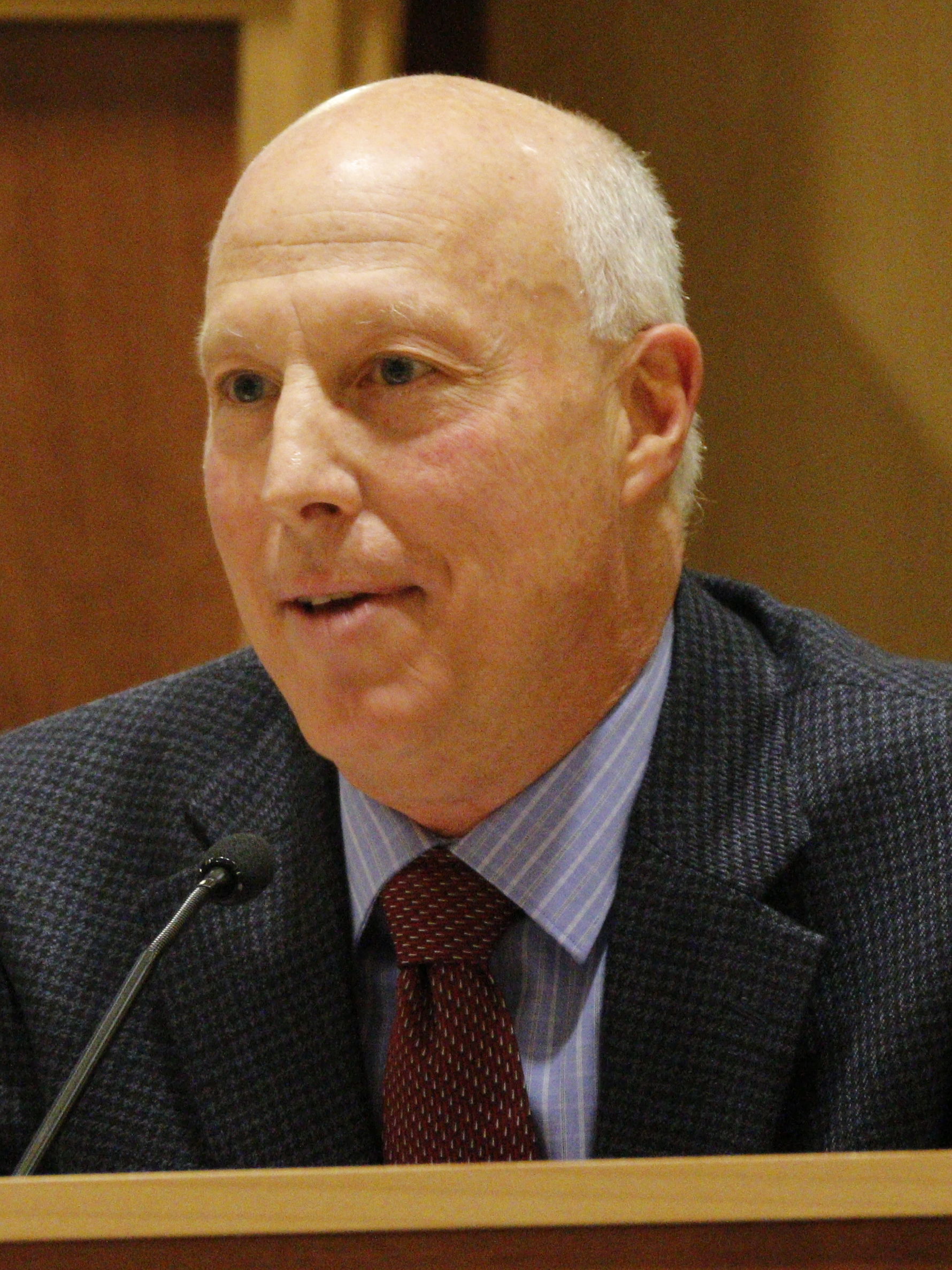
Nominee	John Barrasso	Gary Trauner
Party	Republican	Democratic
Popular vote	136,210	61,227
Percentage	66.96%	30.10%
- Barrasso: 40–50% 50–60% 60–70% 70–80% 80–90% >90% Trauner: 40–50% 50–60% 60–70% 70–80% No votes
U.S. senator before election
John Barrasso
Republican
Elected U.S. Senator
John Barrasso
Republican

The 2018 United States Senate election in Wyoming took place on November 6, 2018, to elect a member of the United States Senate to represent the State of Wyoming. The primary election took place on August 21, 2018. Republican John Barrasso won re-election with 67% percent of the vote, the lowest percentage of his four U.S. Senate campaigns and the closest time since 1996 where a Democrat has come to winning a Senate seat in the state until 2026. It was the first time since that election in which Democrats managed to even win counties in the state, those being Teton and Albany, and also the first time that the Democratic candidate won any counties for this seat since 1994. Trauner was the first Democrat to win Teton County in a Senate contest since 1940 and the first-ever losing Democrat to do so.

== Background ==
In 2012, incumbent Republican John Barrasso was re-elected with 76% of the vote. Heavily rural, Wyoming has the smallest population of any state and is considered the most Republican state in the nation. It had not elected a Democratic Senate candidate since 1970. In 2008, Republican presidential nominee John McCain carried the state with 64% of the vote. Republican Mitt Romney won it in 2012 with 68% of the vote, and Republican Donald Trump won it in 2016 with 67% of the vote.

== Republican primary ==
=== Candidates ===
==== Nominated ====
- John Barrasso, incumbent U.S. senator

==== Declared ====
- Rocky De La Fuente, perennial candidate, and candidate for president of the United States in 2016
- Dave Dodson, businessman
- John Holtz, attorney
- Anthony Van Risseghem

==== Declined ====
- Foster Friess, businessman (running for governor of Wyoming)
- Erik Prince, founder of Academi

==== Withdrawn ====
- Charlie Hardy, Democratic nominee for U.S. Senate in 2014 and candidate for U.S. House of Representatives in 2016 (endorsed Dave Dodson)

=== Results ===
Results by county: Barrasso: 50–60%; 60–70%; 70–80%; Dodson: 50–60%

Republican primary results
Party	Candidate	Votes	%
Republican	John Barrasso (incumbent)	74,292	64.76%
Republican	Dave Dodson	32,647	28.46%
Republican	John Holtz	2,981	2.60%
Republican	Charlie Hardy (withdrawn)	2,377	2.07%
Republican	Roque "Rocky" De La Fuente	1,280	1.16%
Republican	Anthony Van Risseghem	870	0.7%
Write-in		267	0.23%
Total votes		114,714	100%

== Democratic primary ==
=== Candidates ===
==== Nominated ====
- Gary Trauner, businessman and nominee for the U.S. House of Representatives in 2006 and 2008

==== Declined ====
- Mary Throne, former Minority Leader of the Wyoming House of Representatives (running for governor)

=== Results ===
Results by county: Trauner: 90–100%

Democratic primary results
Party	Candidate	Votes	%
Democratic	Gary Trauner	17,562	98.90%
Write-in		195	1.10%
Total votes		17,757	100%

== Independents ==
=== Candidates ===
==== Withdrew ====
- Dave Dodson, businessman (running as a Republican)

== General election ==
=== Predictions ===
Source	Ranking	As of
The Cook Political Report	Safe R	October 26, 2018
Inside Elections	Safe R	November 1, 2018
Sabato's Crystal Ball	Safe R	November 5, 2018
Fox News (Note: The Fox News Midterm Power Rankings uniquely does not contain a category for Safe/Solid races)	Likely R	November 5, 2018
CNN	Safe R	November 5, 2018
RealClearPolitics	Safe R	November 5, 2018

=== Polling ===
Poll source	Date(s) administered	Sample size	Margin of error	John Barrasso (R)	Gary Trauner (D)	Joseph Porambo (L)	Undecided
Change Research	November 2–4, 2018	858	–	60%	31%	6%	–

=== Endorsements ===
John Barrasso (R)

Executive branch officials

- Donald Trump, 45th president of the United States
Gary Trauner (D)

Organizations

- End Citizens United

=== Results ===
2018 United States Senate election in Wyoming
Party	Candidate	Votes	%	±%
Republican	John Barrasso (incumbent)	136,210	66.96%	−8.70%
Democratic	Gary Trauner	61,227	30.10%	+8.45%
Libertarian	Joseph Porambo	5,658	2.78%	N/A
Write-in		325	0.16%	-0.01%
Total votes		203,420	100%	N/A
Republican hold				

==== By county ====
Vote breakdown by county
	John Barrasso Republican		Gary Trauner Democrat		Joseph Porambo Libertarian		Write-ins		Total
County	Votes	%	Votes	%	Votes	%	Votes	%	Votes
Albany	6,366	44.15%	7,576	52.54%	442	3.07%	35	0.24%	14,419
Big Horn	3,564	82.56%	639	14.80%	102	2.36%	12	0.28%	4,317
Campbell	11,020	84.44%	1,628	12.47%	387	2.97%	16	0.12%	13,051
Carbon	3,673	70.72%	1,359	26.16%	156	3.00%	6	0.12%	5,194
Converse	3,959	79.87%	834	16.82%	153	3.09%	11	0.22%	4,957
Crook	2,642	85.56%	335	10.84%	110	3.56%	1	0.03%	3,089
Fremont	9,262	64.34%	4,734	32.89%	380	2.64%	19	0.13%	14,395
Goshen	3,658	76.24%	1,020	21.26%	115	2.40%	5	0.10%	4,798
Hot Springs	1,742	77.15%	455	20.15%	58	2.57%	3	0.13%	2,258
Johnson	3,085	79.33%	722	18.57%	79	2.03%	3	0.08%	3,889
Laramie	19,473	59.72%	12,167	37.31%	907	2.78%	61	0.19%	32,608
Lincoln	5,846	81.23%	1,152	16.01%	187	2.60%	12	0.16%	7,197
Natrona	16,359	66.87%	7,285	29.78%	778	3.18%	42	0.17%	24,464
Niobrara	980	84.56%	144	12.42%	32	2.76%	3	0.26%	1,159
Park	8,938	75.57%	2,589	21.89%	276	2.33%	24	0.20%	11,827
Platte	2,850	75.30%	801	21.16%	131	3.46%	3	0.08%	3,785
Sheridan	8,318	70.46%	3,205	27.15%	261	2.21%	21	0.18%	11,805
Sublette	2,653	77.87%	668	19.61%	84	2.47%	2	0.06%	3,407
Sweetwater	8,577	66.11%	3,943	30.39%	430	3.31%	23	0.18%	12,973
Teton	3,833	32.62%	7,691	65.46%	220	1.87%	6	0.05%	11,750
Uinta	4,713	75.05%	1,371	21.83%	188	2.99%	8	0.13%	6,280
Washakie	2,423	77.91%	588	18.91%	93	2.99%	6	0.19%	3,110
Weston	2,275	84.64%	321	11.94%	89	3.31%	3	0.11%	2,688

Counties that flipped from Republican to Democratic

- Albany (largest municipality: Laramie)
- Teton (largest municipality: Jackson)
