= Mark Gordon =

Governor of Wyoming since 2019

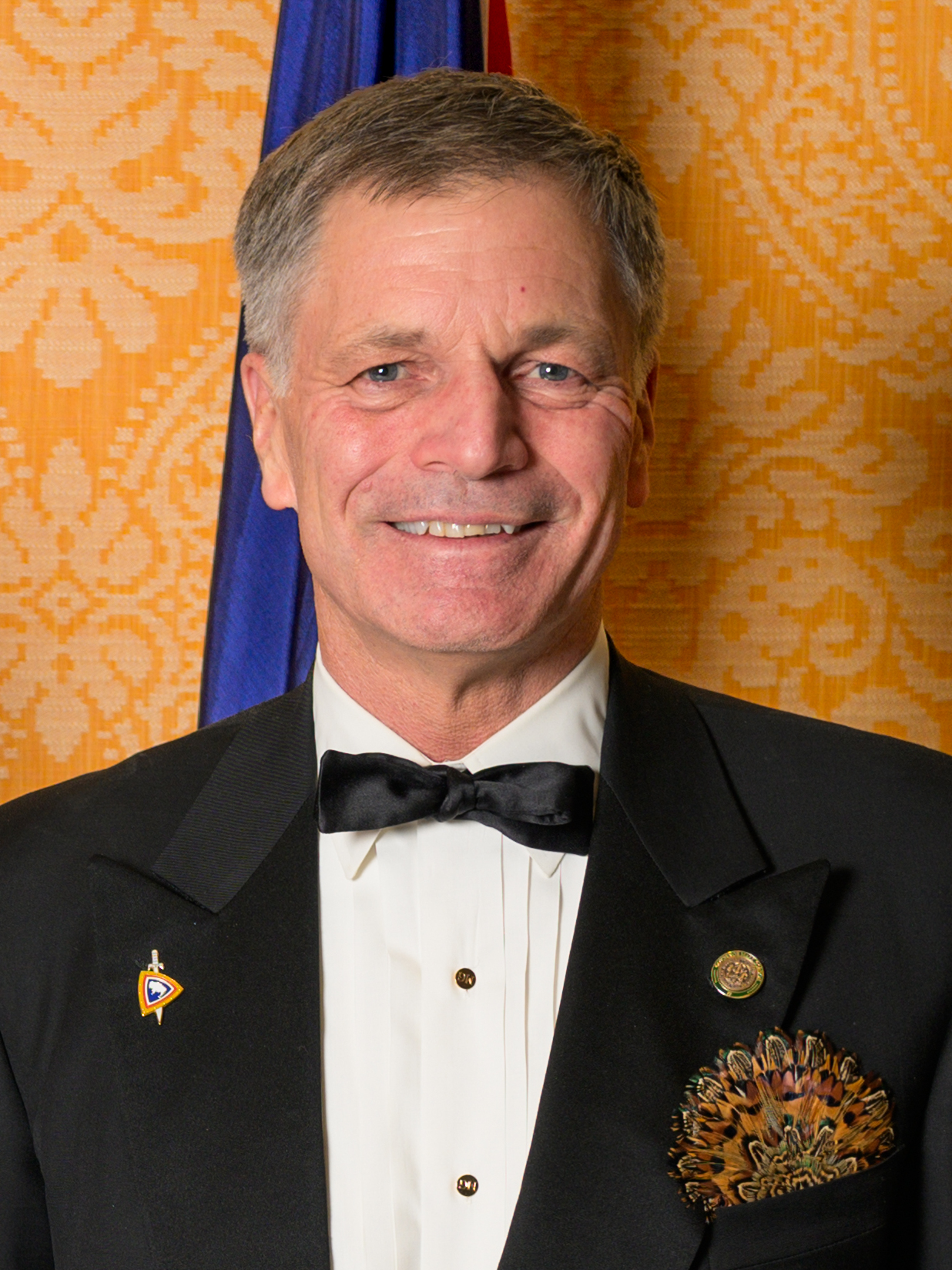
- Gordon in 2025

33rd Governor of Wyoming
- Incumbent
- Assumed office January 7, 2019
- Preceded by: Matt Mead

29th Treasurer of Wyoming
- In office November 1, 2012 – January 7, 2019
- Governor: Matt Mead
- Preceded by: Joseph Meyer
- Succeeded by: Curt Meier

Personal details
- Born: March 14, 1957 (age 69) New York City, U.S.
- Party: Republican
- Spouses: Sarah Hildreth Gilmore (m. 1981; died 1993); Jennie Muir (m. 2000)
- Children: 4
- Relatives: Jean Gordon (aunt); George S. Patton (great-uncle); George Patton IV (first cousin once removed)
- Education: Middlebury College (BA)
- Website: Office website Campaign website
- Gordon's voice Gordon signing proclamations to honor health care professionals during the COVID-19 pandemic. Recorded December 14, 2020

Mark Gordon (born March 14, 1957) is an American politician and rancher serving as the 33rd governor of Wyoming since January 7, 2019. A member of the Republican Party, he previously served as state treasurer; then-governor Matt Mead appointed him to that position on October 26, 2012, to fill the vacancy created by the death of Joseph Meyer.

== Early life and education ==
Gordon was born in New York City, the son of Catherine (née Andrews) and Crawford Gordon. Gordon's father grew up on Drumlin Farm, in Lincoln, Massachusetts. His parents married on October 27, 1945, at the First Unitarian Church of Kennebunk, Maine, before settling at their ranch in Kaycee, Wyoming, in 1947.

Gordon's paternal grandmother was the philanthropist Louise Ayer Hatheway. His paternal great-grandfather was the industrialist and mill magnate Frederick Ayer, founder of the American Woolen Company, and younger brother of the patent medicine tycoon James Cook Ayer, both of Lowell, Massachusetts.

He is a nephew of the socialite Jean Gordon. Gordon is also a great-nephew by marriage of General George S. Patton, and a first cousin once removed of General George Patton IV. He was raised on his family's ranch in Johnson County, Wyoming. He earned a Bachelor of Arts degree in history from Middlebury College in 1979.

== Career ==
=== 2008 congressional run ===
In 2008, Gordon was an unsuccessful candidate in the Republican primary for the United States House of Representatives for Wyoming's at-large congressional district seat held by Barbara Cubin, who was retiring. His main opponent was Cynthia Lummis, also a former state treasurer and the wife of a Democratic former state representative, Alvin Wiederspahn. Former U.S. senator Alan K. Simpson of Cody, considered a moderate Republican, defended Gordon's candidacy but stopped short of an outright endorsement because he was also friendly with Lummis. Former U.S. senator Malcolm Wallop endorsed Gordon, as did Joseph B. Meyer, who was serving as state treasurer at the time.

In the primary, Gordon garnered the endorsements of Wyoming's two most prominent statewide newspapers, The Casper Star-Tribune and the Wyoming Tribune Eagle. Though polls and the financial advantage rested with Gordon in the primary campaign, he lost the nomination to Lummis.

=== Treasurer of Wyoming ===
Gordon was Treasurer of Wyoming from 2012 to 2019. He was sworn in as treasurer on November 1, 2012, by Wyoming Supreme Court Justice William Hill, after being selected by Governor Matt Mead.

Gordon was elected to a full term as treasurer in 2014.

=== Governor of Wyoming ===
==== 2018 election ====
Gordon declined to run for Cynthia Lummis's seat in the U.S. House of Representatives in 2016, the one he ran for in 2008, and instead ran for governor of Wyoming in 2018. He won the Republican primary on August 21 and the general election on November 6, defeating Democratic state representative Mary Throne. Gordon was inaugurated on January 7, 2019.

==== 2022 election ====
Gordon was reelected to a second term against Democratic nominee Theresa Livingston in the general election.

==== Tenure ====
Gordon was sworn in on January 7, 2019.

Amid a November 2020 spike in coronavirus cases, Gordon imposed some restrictions on indoor and outdoor public gatherings. He did not implement curfews, temporarily close any businesses or initially impose a statewide mask mandate. Gordon and his wife, Jennie Gordon, contracted COVID-19 later in the month. In December 2020, Gordon imposed a statewide mask mandate. In February 2021, he extended that order until the end of the month. On March 8, 2021, he announced that he would lift the mask mandate on March 16. On March 16, the mask mandate was lifted.

In November 2020, Gordon proposed $500 million in cuts to the Wyoming budget to account for declining revenue from the fossil fuel industry (particularly coal mining), which is crucial to Wyoming's economy. On April 2, 2021, he signed a budget passed by the Wyoming legislature that cut $430 million instead of the $500 million Gordon proposed, due to improved budget forecasts for the year of 2021 and supplemental money from the American Rescue Plan Act signed by President Biden. The budget Gordon signed decreases the amount cut to the University of Wyoming and the Wyoming Department of Health.

In 2021, a New York Times investigation revealed that Gordon had been targeted by hard-right conservatives, such as Susan Gore, the heiress to the Gore-Tex fortune. Gore funded secret operatives who targeted Gordon. Part of this is due to Gordon's investment in renewable energy and policy on climate change, which led to a vote of no confidence by the state party. Gordon has embraced wind energy as a part of Wyoming's economic exports, such as the developing Chokecherry and Sierra Madre Wind Energy Project.

As of 2022, Gordon often polls as one of the nation's most popular governors.

On March 7, 2024, Gordon banned Delta 8 hemp in Wyoming.

==== Relations with the Wyoming Legislature ====
===== Freedom Caucus and the 2025 session =====
Gordon's relationship with the Wyoming Legislature became increasingly contentious after the Wyoming Freedom Caucus gained control of the Wyoming House of Representatives following the 2024 elections. WyoFile has described the caucus and its allies as far-right Republican lawmakers and described its national sponsor, the State Freedom Caucus Network, as a national right-wing political organization seeking to establish hard-line majorities in state legislatures.

Before the 2025 session, Gordon said that he would work with the Legislature's new leadership but described Freedom Caucus lawmakers as politically aggressive and focused on finding faults in his administration. During the session, he questioned whether caucus members were voting according to their constituents' interests or according to instructions from outside the chamber. He said that their legislative record would give Wyoming voters an opportunity to determine whether the caucus had represented them.

===== Freedom Caucus voting coordination =====
The Freedom Caucus received legislative research and voting recommendations from Jessie Rubino, the Wyoming state director of the Washington, D.C.-based State Freedom Caucus Network. The national network paid Rubino's salary as part of its partnership with the Wyoming caucus. Rubino, a graduate of the University of Wyoming College of Law and founder of the university's Turning Point USA chapter, researched bills and supplied voting recommendations to caucus members and allied lawmakers, sometimes by text message while votes were taking place.

Then-caucus chairman John Bear confirmed that text messages summarized Rubino's and the caucus's positions on bills and amendments. Bear said that lawmakers were not required to follow every recommendation, although the organization maintained undisclosed voting-adherence thresholds for membership. He said the caucus was pleased with how consistently its members voted together. Other Republican legislators criticized the practice. Clark Stith said members voted in lockstep according to text-message instructions, while Steve Harshman called the practice a departure from Wyoming's citizen legislators' traditional independence.

===== 2026 primary results =====
In the August 2026 Republican primaries, the Freedom Caucus lost the House majority it had gained two years earlier. Thirteen incumbent caucus members lost their House seats, six caucus-aligned lawmakers lost campaigns for Senate seats, and the organization gained no new House seats. WyoFile called the result a "stunning upset" and projected that the caucus would be reduced from a House majority to about 10 reliable votes. The losses also deprived the caucus of enough votes to obstruct the two-thirds introductory threshold used during legislative budget sessions.

Responding to the results, Gordon said that Wyoming voters had rejected national political talking points and had instead considered the state's future. He also criticized the Wyoming Republican Party for endorsing candidates aligned with Freedom Caucus priorities and said the party should allow Republican voters to choose candidates for themselves. Rubino directed reporters to a Freedom Caucus statement declaring that the organization was "not going anywhere" and defending its record on taxes, school policy, voting restrictions and legislation about transgender people.

===== Local authority and gun-free zones =====
Several disputes between Gordon and the Freedom Caucus concerned whether authority should remain with local governments and public institutions or be transferred to the Legislature. In February 2025, Gordon allowed House Bill 172, which repealed certain gun-free zones, to become law without his signature. The legislation permitted concealed firearms in public schools, the University of Wyoming, community colleges, state-owned facilities, and government meetings. It removed much of the authority those institutions had previously exercised over concealed firearms in their facilities.

Although Gordon supported expanded firearm-carrying rights, he called the measure a "legislative power grab". He wrote that gun-free zones had not actually been eliminated but were instead "determined exclusively by the legislature". Gordon called the legislation a "political bomb" produced by the election that put the Freedom Caucus and its allies in the House majority.

===== Medication-abortion ultrasound requirement =====
Gordon also vetoed House Bill 64, which required a patient seeking a medication abortion to undergo an ultrasound at least 48 hours before receiving abortion medication. During early pregnancy, the examination would generally have required a transvaginal ultrasound, in which an ultrasound probe is inserted into the vagina. The legislation had no exceptions for pregnancies resulting from rape or incest.

Although Gordon described himself as opposed to abortion, he said that requiring the procedure constituted excessive government intrusion into a private medical decision. He called the mandated examination an "intimate, personally invasive, and often medically unnecessary procedure" and said that imposing it on victims of rape could be cruel and could discourage victims from reporting sexual assaults. The Legislature overrode his veto, with the House voting 45 to 16 and the Senate voting 22 to 9.

===== Radiant nuclear project =====
In October 2025, Gordon blamed the Freedom Caucus for contributing to Radiant Industries' decision to abandon plans for a nuclear-microreactor manufacturing facility near Bar Nunn, Wyoming, and instead locate the project in Oak Ridge, Tennessee. Gordon accused the caucus of employing "Club No" tactics and said that its members objected to the proposal without discussing possible solutions. He told Wyoming Public Media that the caucus was interested in "fearmongering".

Freedom Caucus member Bill Allemand was a leading legislative opponent of the proposed facility. Allemand supported manufacturing the reactors but opposed allowing the company to store spent nuclear fuel at the site. After Radiant withdrew its Wyoming proposal, Allemand said he was "elated". Radiant's senior director of operations said the company selected Tennessee because of the greater regulatory certainty available there.

Gordon contrasted Wyoming's response with Tennessee's willingness to pursue nuclear manufacturing and provide regulatory certainty. He warned that Wyoming could either participate in emerging industries or "gently coast into oblivion". Gordon said Wyoming should be a state to which companies turned for regulatory clarity, infrastructure, and partnership rather than one governed by fear and automatic opposition.

===== 2026 budget dispute =====
The conflict continued during preparation of Wyoming's 2026 biennial budget. The Joint Appropriations Committee of the Wyoming Legislature, chaired by former Freedom Caucus chairman John Bear and containing a majority of Freedom Caucus members and endorsees in its House delegation, proposed sweeping reductions to Gordon's budget. Wyoming Public Media reported that the caucus led much of the committee's work and that its proposals were frequently supported by a majority of the committee's senators.

The committee proposed reductions affecting the University of Wyoming, the Wyoming departments of Health and Family Services, state employee compensation, and the Wyoming Business Council. Freedom Caucus member Ken Pendergraft successfully proposed reducing the university's block grant by $40 million. The committee also voted to eliminate funding for Wyoming Public Media, reduce funding for university athletics and other programs, and dismantle the Wyoming Business Council. Freedom Caucus member Ann Lucas defended the reductions as requiring government to tighten its belt, while Pendergraft questioned whether the Business Council was compatible with free-market principles.

Gordon attributed the proposal to "Freedom Caucus, aka Club No, members" on the committee and called it a "demolition budget". He accused its supporters of importing "cut everything" rhetoric for political theater and said Wyoming did not have structural debt or runaway spending. Gordon urged the full legislature to restore funding for core institutions and warned that the reductions could cause lasting damage to education, healthcare, economic development and rural communities.

The Freedom Caucus ultimately agreed to restore most of the funding to the levels Gordon recommended. At the conclusion of the budget session, Gordon thanked lawmakers for their work and acknowledged that the relationship had been difficult at times. He said that the executive and legislative branches did not always agree but needed to continue working together for Wyoming.

== Political positions ==
=== Abortion ===
On March 18, 2023, Gordon signed SF0109 into law, which banned abortion pills in Wyoming.

=== Transgender students in sports ===
Gordon has not taken a formal stance on HB0063, saying he prefers "local districts to address issues individually".

=== Energy policy ===
Gordon advocates balancing federal carbon capture investments with traditional energy sectors, calling it a "pragmatic transition".

== Personal life ==
Gordon met his first wife, the former Sarah Hildreth Gilmore, at Middlebury College. They married on March 7, 1981. In 1993, she died in an automobile accident. They had two daughters.

In 1998 Gordon met his current wife, the former Jennie Muir Young, and they married in 2000. Together they own the Merlin Ranch east of Buffalo in Johnson County, Wyoming. In 2009, their ranch received the Society for Range Management Wyoming Section "Excellence in Rangeland Stewardship" award.

On November 25, 2020, during the COVID-19 pandemic, Gordon tested positive for the virus on the same day his office was to be reopened, after an employee of his had tested positive earlier. Gordon's office remained closed temporarily for deep-cleaning after his diagnosis.

== Electoral history ==
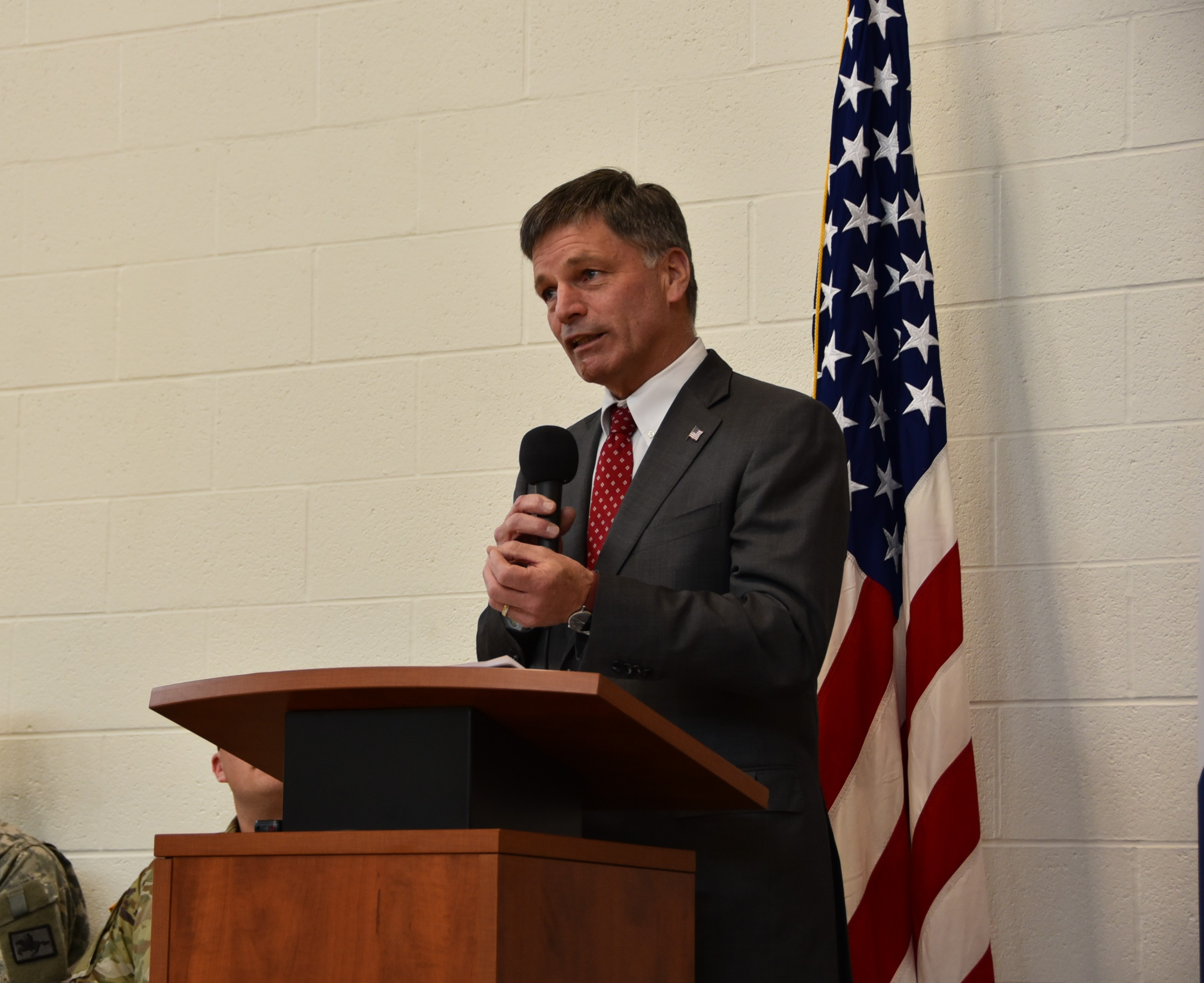
Gordon in 2019

2008 United States House of Representatives election in Wyoming - Republican primary
Party	Candidate	Votes	%
Republican	Cynthia Lummis	33,149	44.0
Republican	Mark Gordon	26,827	35.7
Republican	Bill Winney	8,537	11.4
Republican	Michael Holland	3,171	4.2
n/a	Under Votes	2,838	3.8
n/a	Over Votes	509	0.7
Republican	Write-ins	139	0.2
Total votes		75,170	100.0

2014 Wyoming Treasurer - Republican primary
Party	Candidate	Votes	%
Republican	Mark Gordon (incumbent)	72,095	72.6
n/a	Under Votes	17,060	17.2
Republican	Ron Redo	9,945	10.0
Republican	Write-ins	206	0.2
n/a	Over Votes	6	0.0
Total votes		99,312	100.0

2014 Wyoming Treasurer - General Election
Party	Candidate	Votes	%
Republican	Mark Gordon (incumbent)	138,831	81.1
n/a	Under Votes	31,044	18.1
Republican	Write-ins	1,262	0.7
n/a	Over Votes	16	0.0
Total votes		171,153	100.0

2018 Wyoming gubernatorial election - Republican primary
Party	Candidate	Votes	%
Republican	Mark Gordon	38,951	33.0
Republican	Foster Friess	29,842	25.3
Republican	Harriet Hageman	25,052	21.2
Republican	Sam Galeotos	14,554	12.3
Republican	Taylor Haynes	6,511	5.5
Republican	Bill Dahlin	1,763	1.5
n/a	Under Votes	1,269	1.1
Republican	Write-ins	113	0.1
n/a	Over Votes	46	0.0
Total votes		118,101	100.0

2018 Wyoming gubernatorial election - General election
Party	Candidate	Votes	%
Republican	Mark Gordon	136,412	66.5
Democratic	Mary Throne	55,965	27.3
Constitution	Rex Rammell	6,751	3.3
Libertarian	Lawrence Struempf	3,010	1.5
n/a	Under Votes	1,966	1.0
n/a	Write-ins	1,100	0.5
n/a	Over Votes	71	0.0
Total votes		205,275	100.0

2022 Wyoming gubernatorial election - Republican primary
Party	Candidate	Votes	%
Republican	Mark Gordon (incumbent)	101,140	58.8
Republican	Brent Bien	48,572	28.2
Republican	Rex Rammell	9,378	5.5
n/a	Under Votes	7,626	4.4
Republican	James Scott Quick	4,728	2.7
Republican	Write-ins	533	0.3
n/a	Over Votes	70	
Total votes		172,047	100.0

2022 Wyoming gubernatorial election - General election
Party	Candidate	Votes	%
Republican	Mark Gordon (incumbent)	143,696	72.5
Democratic	Theresa Livingston	30,686	15.5
n/a	Write-ins	11,461	5.8
Libertarian	Jared Baldes	8,157	4.1
n/a	Under Votes	4,107	2.1
n/a	Over Votes	91	0.0
Total votes		198,198	100.0

Political offices
Preceded by Joseph Meyer	Treasurer of Wyoming; 2012–2019	Succeeded by Curt Meier
Preceded by Matt Mead	Governor of Wyoming; 2019–present	Incumbent
Party political offices
Preceded by Matt Mead	Republican nominee for Governor of Wyoming; 2018, 2022	Succeeded by Eric Barlow
U.S. order of precedence (ceremonial)
Preceded by JD Vance as Vice President	Order of precedence of the United States; Within Wyoming	Succeeded by Mayor of city in which event is held
Preceded by JD Vance as Vice President	Order of precedence of the United States; Within Wyoming	Succeeded by Otherwise Mike Johnson as Speaker of the House
Preceded by Brad Little as Governor of Idaho	Order of precedence of the United States; Outside Wyoming	Succeeded by Spencer Cox as Governor of Utah
