= 2000 United States House of Representatives election in Wyoming =

2000 United States House of Representatives election in Wyoming's at-large district
- November 7, 2000
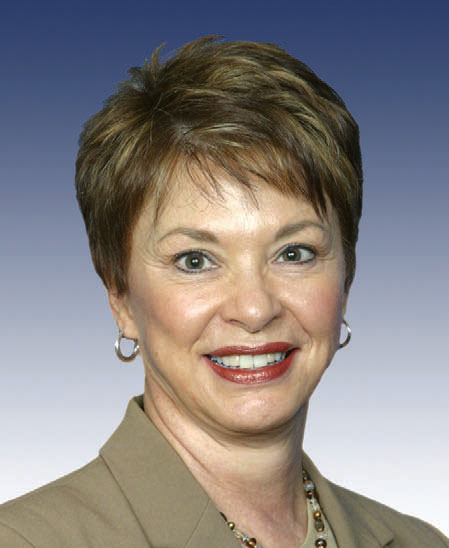

Nominee	Barbara Cubin	Michael Allen Green
Party	Republican	Democratic
Popular vote	141,848	60,638
Percentage	66.81%	28.56%
- County results Cubin: 40–50% 50–60% 60–70% 70–80% 80–90%
U.S. Representative before election
Barbara Cubin
Republican
Elected U.S. Representative
Barbara Cubin
Republican

The 2000 United States House of Representatives election in Wyoming was held on November 7, 2000. Incumbent Republican Congresswoman Barbara Cubin ran for re-election to her fourth term. After winning the Republican primary, Cubin faced Michael Allen Green, an office clerk and the Democratic nominee. In the strongest performance of her congressional tenure, Cubin overwhelmingly defeated Green, winning re-election with 66.81 percent of the vote.

== Democratic primary ==
=== Candidates ===
- Michael Allen Green, office clerk
- Leonard Munker, former state public defender

=== Results ===
Democratic primary results
Party	Candidate	Votes	%
Democratic	Michael Allen Green	14,219	53.11%
Democratic	Leonard Munker	12,555	46.89%
Total votes		26,774	100.00%

== Republican primary ==
=== Candidates ===
- Barbara Cubin, incumbent U.S. representative
- Larry Jay Herdt, truck driver
- Dino Wenino, massage therapist

=== Results ===
Republican primary results
Party	Candidate	Votes	%
Republican	Barbara Cubin (inc.)	54,946	77.82%
Republican	Larry Jay Herdt	10,148	14.37%
Republican	Dino Wenino	5,515	7.81%
Total votes		70,609	100.00%

== General election ==
=== Results ===
2000 Wyoming's at-large congressional district general election results
Party	Candidate	Votes	%
Republican	Barbara Cubin (inc.)	141,848	66.81%
Democratic	Michael Allen Green	60,638	28.56%
Libertarian	Lewis Stock	6,411	3.02%
Libertarian	Victor Raymond	3,415	1.61%
Total votes		212,312	100.00%
Republican hold			

Counties that flipped from Democratic to Republican

- Sweetwater (largest city: Rock Springs)
