= 2008 United States House of Representatives election in Wyoming =

2008 United States House of Representatives election in Wyoming's at-large district
- November 4, 2008
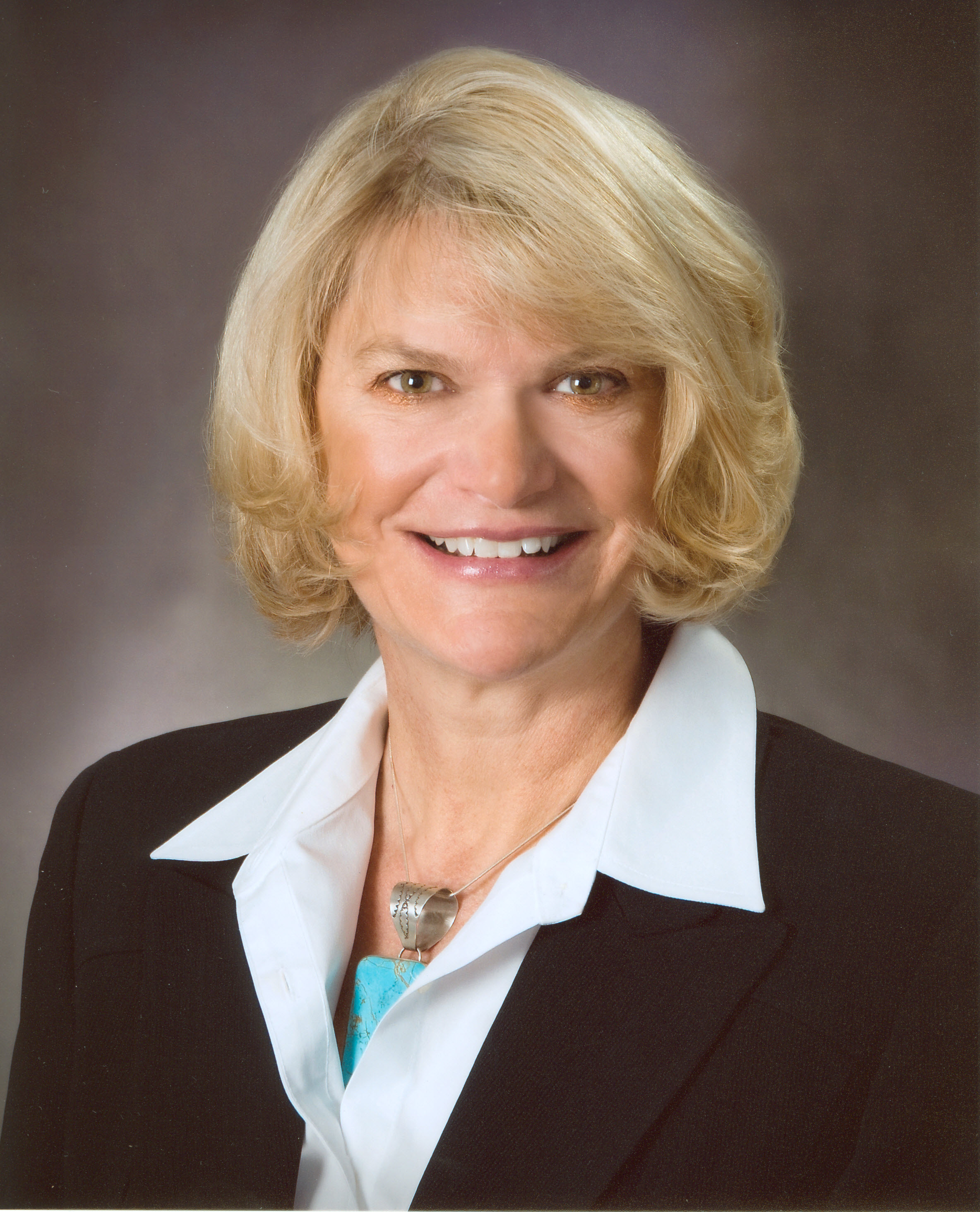

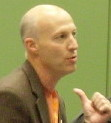
Nominee	Cynthia Lummis	Gary Trauner
Party	Republican	Democratic
Popular vote	131,244	106,758
Percentage	52.70%	42.87%
- County results Lummis: 50–60% 60–70% 70–80% Trauner: 40–50% 50–60% 60–70%
U.S. Representative before election
Barbara Cubin
Republican
Elected U.S. Representative
Cynthia Lummis
Republican

The 2008 United States House of Representatives election in Wyoming took place on November 4, 2008. Incumbent Republican Congresswoman Barbara Cubin declined to seek re-election. Former State Treasurer Cynthia Lummis won the Republican primary to succeed Cubin, and advanced to the general election, where she was opposed by businessman Gary Trauner, the Democratic nominee, who had previously run for the seat in 2006. Lummis defeated Trauner by a wide margin, improving significantly from Cubin's narrow victory over him two years prior.

== Democratic primary ==
=== Candidates ===
- Gary Trauner, businessman, 2006 Democratic nominee for the U.S. House

=== Results ===
Democratic primary results
Party	Candidate	Votes	%
Democratic	Gary Trauner	24,741	100.00%
Total votes		24,741	100.00%

== Republican primary ==
=== Candidates ===
- Cynthia Lummis, former State Treasurer
- Mark Gordon, rancher, former Chairman of the Wyoming Environmental Qualify Council
- Bill Winney, retired U.S. Navy captain, 2006 Republican candidate for the U.S. House
- Michael S. Holland, Green River physician

==== Declined to run ====
- Roy Cohee, Speaker of the Wyoming House of Representatives
- Matt Mead, former U.S. Attorney for the District of Wyoming
- Swede Nelson, Cheyenne inspirational speaker
- Tom Sansonetti, former United States Assistant Attorney General for the Environment and Natural Resources Division
- Colin M. Simpson, State Representative
- Dan Zwonitzer, State Representative

=== Polling ===
Poll source	Date(s) administered	Sample size	Margin of error	Cynthia Lummis	Tom Sansonetti	Dan Zwonitzer	Roy Cohee	Matt Mead	Swede Nelson	Bill Winney	Undecided
Mason-Dixon Polling & Strategy	January 18-21, 2008	325	4%	31%	9%	5%	4%	3%	2%	1%	45%

=== Results ===
Republican primary results
Party	Candidate	Votes	%
Republican	Cynthia Lummis	33,149	46.24%
Republican	Mark Gordon	26,827	37.42%
Republican	Bill Winney	8,537	11.91%
Republican	Michael S. Holland	3,171	4.42%
Total votes		71,684	100.00%

== Libertarian primary ==
=== Candidates ===
- W. David Herbert, Riverton podiatrist

=== Results ===
Libertarian primary results
Party	Candidate	Votes	%
Libertarian	W. David Herbert	187	100.00%
Total votes		187	100.00%

== General election ==
=== Predictions ===
Source	Ranking	As of
The Cook Political Report	Lean R	November 6, 2008
Rothenberg	Lean R	November 2, 2008
Sabato's Crystal Ball	Lean R	November 6, 2008
Real Clear Politics	Lean R	November 7, 2008
CQ Politics	Tossup	November 6, 2008

=== Polling ===
Poll source	Date(s) administered	Sample size	Margin of error	Trauner (D)	Lummis (R)	Herbert (L)	Undecided
Mason-Dixon Polling & Strategy	January 18-21, 2008	625	4%	41%	40%	—	19%
Mason-Dixon Polling & Strategy	October 13-14, 2008	625	4%	44%	43%	4%	9%

=== Results ===
2008 Wyoming's at-large congressional district general election results
Party	Candidate	Votes	%
Republican	Cynthia Lummis	131,244	52.62%
Democratic	Gary Trauner	106,758	42.81%
Libertarian	W. David Herbert	11,030	4.42%
Write-in		363	0.15%
Total votes		249,395	100.00%
Republican hold			

==== Counties that flipped from Democratic to Republican ====
- Fremont (Largest city: Riverton)
- Natrona (Largest city: Casper)
- Carbon (Largest city: Rawlins)
