= Foster Friess =

American investment banker and political donor (1940–2021)

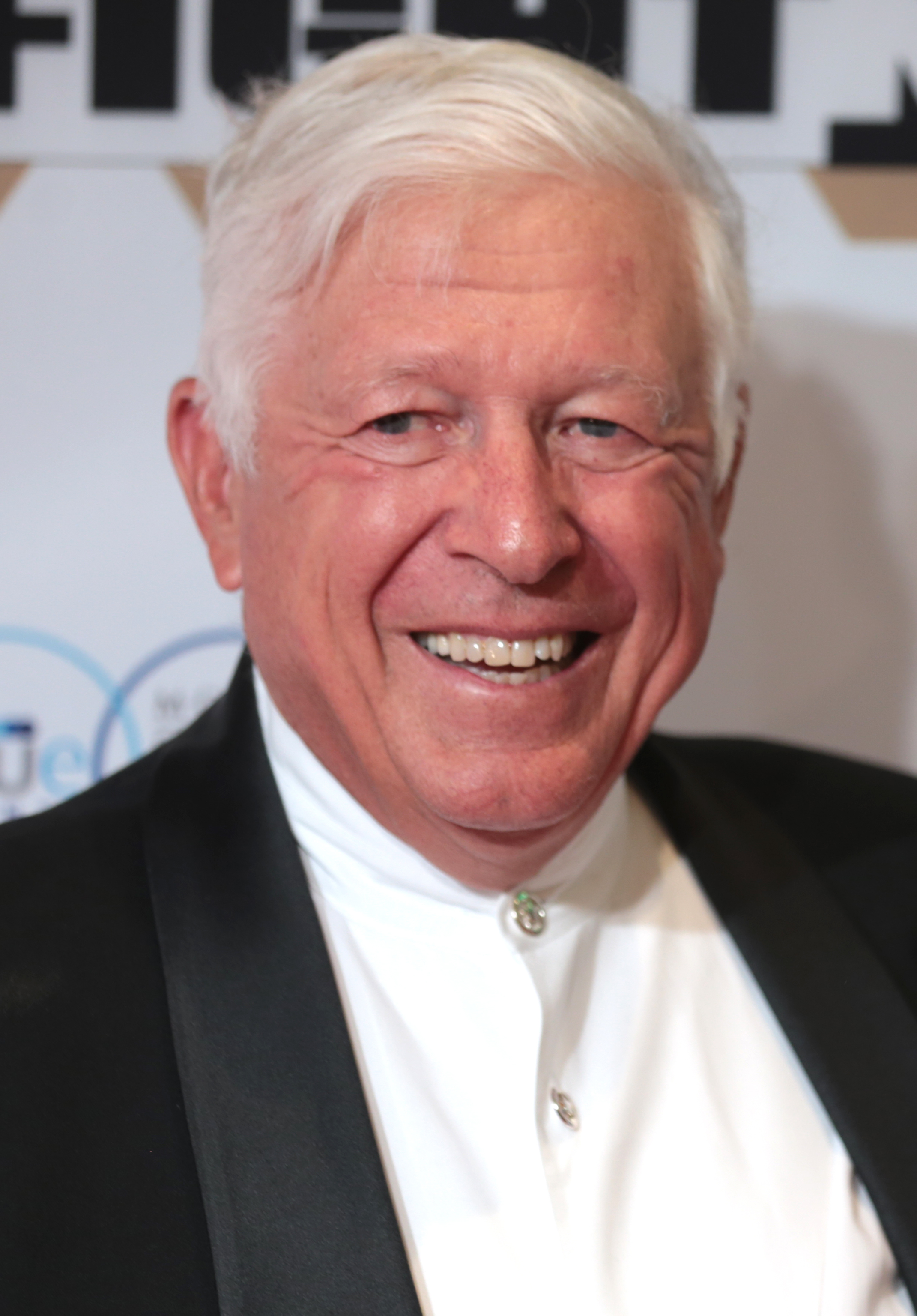
- Friess in March 2017
- Born: Foster Stephen Friess; April 2, 1940; Rice Lake, Wisconsin, US
- Died: May 27, 2021 (aged 81); Scottsdale, Arizona, U.S.
- Education: University of Wisconsin–Madison (BA)
- Occupations: Businessman; politician; philanthropist; political donor
- Political party: Republican
- Spouse: Lynnette Estes (m. 1962)
- Children: 4
- Military career
- Branch: United States Army
- Service years: 1960–1965
- Rank: Captain

Foster Stephen Friess (April 2, 1940 – May 27, 2021) was an American investment manager and prominent donor to the Republican Party and to Christian right causes. He unsuccessfully sought the Republican nomination for governor of Wyoming in the 2018 election, losing in the primary to state treasurer Mark Gordon. In 1999, CNBC dubbed Friess one of the "century's great investors". In a 2001 article, BusinessWeek suggested Friess "may be the longest-surviving successful growth-stock picker, having navigated markets for 36 years, in his own firm since 1974."

== Early life and education ==
Friess was born on April 2, 1940 in Rice Lake, Wisconsin, the son of Ethel (Foster) and Albert Friess. His father was a cattle rancher and he grew up on the farm. As a student at Rice Lake High School in Rice Lake, Friess was valedictorian of his class and a member of the basketball and track teams.

A first-generation college graduate, Friess attended the University of Wisconsin (now University of Wisconsin–Madison), where he earned a degree in business administration. As a student, he served as president of Chi Phi fraternity, enrolled in the Reserve Officers' Training Corps, and was named one of the "ten most outstanding senior men." In 1962, he married fellow student Lynnette Estes, with whom he had four children. Friess was a born-again Christian.

== Career ==
After graduating from college, Friess trained to be an infantry platoon leader and served as the intelligence officer for the 1st Guided Missile Brigade at Fort Bliss, Texas. In 1965, he began his investment career, joining the Brittingham family-controlled NYSE member firm in Wilmington, Delaware, where he eventually rose to the position of director of research.

In 1974, Friess and his wife launched their own investment management firm, Friess Associates, LLC. Although success came slowly in its early years, the firm grew to over $15.7 billion in assets managed. Forbes named the Brandywine Fund, a Friess Associates flagship that boasted an average of 20% annual gains in the decade ending in 1990, as one of the decade's top performers.

In 2001, Friess Associates partnered with Affiliated Managers Group (AMG), an asset-management firm, to facilitate succession planning and to spread ownership among its partners. AMG acquired a majority interest in Friess Associates in October 2001 and held a 70% interest as of September 2011. A broad group of Friess partners, including senior management and researchers, held 20% equity ownership, while the Friess family retained 10%. The company was purchased by its employees in 2013.

== Political activism ==
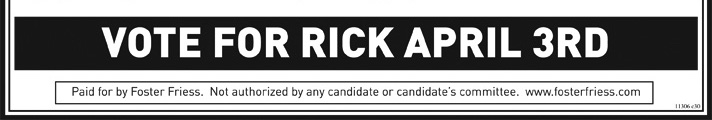
Excerpt from a pro-Santorum newspaper advertisement funded by Friess ahead of the 2012 Wisconsin primary

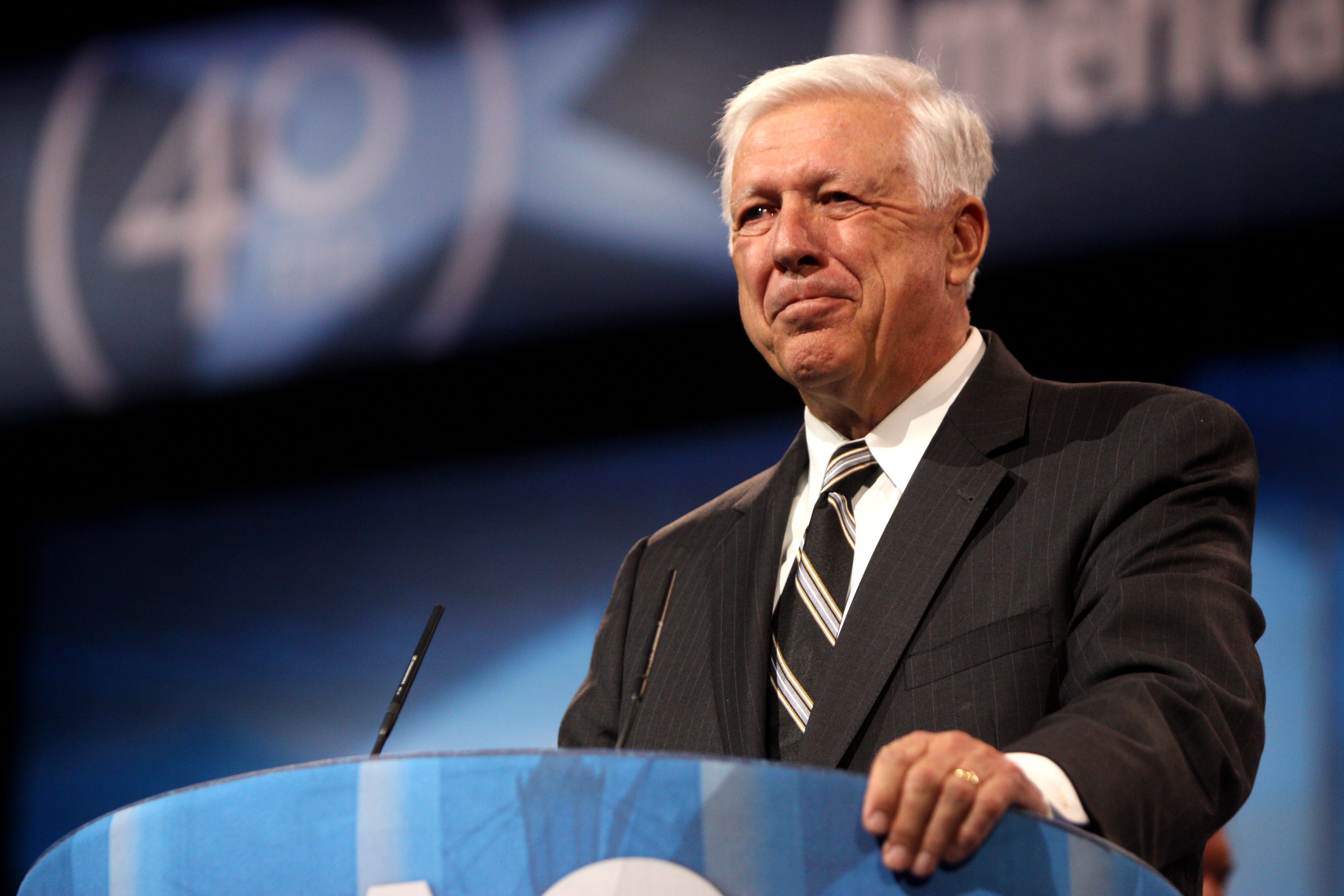
Friess speaking at CPAC 2013

Friess was a longtime Republican Party mega-donor, giving millions of dollars to Republican and conservative causes, especially on the Christian right.

Friess donated $250,000 to Rick Santorum's re-election campaign in 2006, and at least the same amount to the Republican Governors' Association. Friess largely funded Santorum's unsuccessful campaign for the 2012 Republican presidential nomination. Friess was instrumental in keeping Santorum's flagging campaign alive by financing a super PAC, the Red, White and Blue Fund, which ran television advertisements on behalf of Santorum, who was unable to run a television campaign with his own funds. According to campaign filings with the Federal Election Commission, Friess' contributions to the Red, White and Blue Fund were more than 40% of its total assets, or $331,000 as of December 31, 2011.

In the wake of the 2012 New Hampshire Republican primary, and before the South Carolina primary, Friess told Politico that he was "putting together a challenge grant to encourage other wealthy donors to give to the Red, White and Blue Fund, ... he said [the fund] received a $1 million check" the day after the New Hampshire vote. The million-dollar donation was conveyed in four checks between November 2011 and January 2012.

In addition to Santorum's faith, opposition to abortion, and hawkish foreign policy leanings, the possibility of defeating incumbent President Barack Obama was a major component of Friess's decision to back Santorum's campaign. Friess reportedly considered major contributions to American Crossroads, the super PAC founded by Republican National Committee chair Ed Gillespie and Karl Rove, a former White House strategist for President George W. Bush .

Friess also donated $100,000 to Wisconsin Governor Scott Walker to help defeat the Democrats' recall effort in 2011. He reportedly invested more than $3 million in conservative commentator Tucker Carlson's The Daily Caller website. At one of the semi-annual, private seminars held by the Koch brothers in June 2011, Friess was recognized for his donation exceeding $1 million to the Kochs' political activities.

While being interviewed by NBC correspondent Andrea Mitchell regarding contraception, Friess said, "... this contraceptive thing, my gosh, it's so–it's such–inexpensive, you know, back in my days, they used Bayer Aspirin for contraception. The gals put it between their knees and it wasn't that costly." Friess later apologized for the comment.

Friess was also an advisor to Turning Point USA, a conservative youth organization to which he donated seed money. In October 2017, he said that he was exploring a possible candidacy for the Senate challenging Wyoming Senator John Barrasso for the Republican nomination, at the request of Steve Bannon. However, in April 2018, he instead decided to enter the crowded Republican field to replace term-limited Governor Matt Mead. Friess was defeated in the primary, coming in second to State Treasurer Mark Gordon by 38,951 votes (33%) to 29,842 (25.3%).

== Philanthropy ==
Friess and his wife ran the Friess Family Foundation, which declares its activities as including the support of Christian mobile medical services, sponsoring Water Mission's work to provide clean water in Malawi, and donating to relief and recovery efforts following natural disasters such as Hurricane Katrina, the 2004 Indonesian tsunami, and the 2010 Haiti earthquake.

Friess sponsored a matching grant program to raise $2 million for relief efforts for the 2004 Indonesian tsunami and traveled to the areas most affected by the earthquake and tsunami in order to speak with local church and organization leaders to identify the best efforts to support. He sponsored another matching grant for Hurricane Katrina relief efforts, raising more than $4 million.

Friess supported Community Options, a national nonprofit which develops housing and employment for people with disabilities. He supported a YMCA development in Maryvale, Arizona, along with several local mentoring and ministry programs. He was the principal donor behind the Friess Family Community Campus, a $3.7 million complex equipped with football, baseball, softball fields, and a track at Rice Lake High School in his hometown.

Friess gained fame when news of his 70th birthday party spread. At the lavish event he announced that he would give one charity nominated by his guests $70,000. He surprised his guests by giving each of their favorite charities $70,000, totaling over $7 million. In addition he was the primary donor to a Classical Christian school, Jackson Hole Classical Academy in Jackson, Wyoming.

Friess won many awards for his religious work including the 2012 Horatio Alger Award from the Horatio Alger Association of Distinguished Americans, the Canterbury Medal from the Becket Fund for Religious Liberty, the Adam Smith Award from Hillsdale College, the Albert Schweitzer Leadership Award from the Hugh O'Brian Youth Leadership Foundation, the David R. Jones Award for Leadership in Philanthropy, and a Medal of Distinction from the University of Delaware in Newark.

According to his website, Friess in 2016 began supporting Rachel's Challenge, a non-profit organization started in the name of Rachel Scott, the first victim of the Columbine High School massacre, by matching all donations up to $100,000. Following the 2018 Parkland shooting, in a USA Today op-ed, Friess issued a $2.5 million challenge grant to groups like Sandy Hook Promise and Rachel's Challenge.

Friess often joked about his wealth in public appearances, while at the same time drawing attention to his financial status. In early 2020, he said on his website that his business was worth $15 billion, although in 2012 he had told a reporter that he was not a billionaire. Estimates at that time placed his wealth in the hundreds of millions.

== Personal life ==
At an event to celebrate Friess' 70th birthday, he gave $7.7 million to the guests' favorite charities. He typically wore a cowboy hat in public. He embraced the Western image as part of moving to Jackson Hole, Wyoming, in 1992. He said he made the move because Wyoming's lack of an income tax helped him avoid "increasingly onerous" taxes in Pennsylvania. Progressive website ThinkProgress reported Friess was funding Islamophobic campaigns, while he also made statements for moderate gay rights, citing them as an issue of religious liberty. During a media interview, when asked a question about birth control, he said women should simply put an aspirin between their knees rather than take birth control.

== Later life and death ==
Friess was diagnosed with myelodysplasia, a bone marrow cancer, in September 2020. He died on May 27, 2021 in Scottsdale, Arizona, at the age of 81.

== Electoral history ==
2018 Wyoming gubernatorial Republican primary
| Party | Candidate | Votes | % |
|---|---|---|---|
| Republican | Mark Gordon | 38,951 | 33.0 |
| Republican | Foster Friess | 29,842 | 25.3 |
| Republican | Harriet Hageman | 25,052 | 21.2 |
| Republican | Sam Galeotos | 14,554 | 12.3 |
| Republican | Taylor Haynes | 6,511 | 5.5 |
| Republican | Bill Dahlin | 1,763 | 1.5 |
| n/a | Under votes | 1,269 | 1.1 |
| Republican | Write-ins | 113 | 0.0 |
| n/a | Over votes | 46 | 0.0 |
| Total votes | | 118,101 | 100.0 |
