= Community Options =

American nonprofit organization

- Formation: 1989; 37 years ago
- Founder: Robert Stack
- Type: 501(c)(3) non-profit
- Purpose: Disability services
- Location: Princeton, New Jersey
- Region served: United States
- Key people: Robert Stack; Dr. Colleen Wieck; Frank Zak; Paul Hritz; Elizabeth Pendler
- Website: www.comop.org

Community Options, Inc. is a 501(c)(3) national nonprofit organization that provides housing and employment supports to people with intellectual disabilities, developmental disabilities and traumatic brain injury. The organization's headquarters are located in Princeton, New Jersey, and it has offices in 12 states, supporting more than 5,000 people with disabilities. Community Options was founded by Robert Stack in 1989.

== History ==
The organization was founded in February 1989 by Robert Stack, the president and CEO, along with a small group of disability advocates, including Dr. Colleen Wieck, Frank Zak, Paul Hritz and Elizabeth Pendler, to create residential and employment supports for individuals with disabilities. As of 2008, the organization supported over 1,400 people with disabilities. Community Options also advocates for the deinstitutionalization movement. The organization states that all people with disabilities should live in community-based settings and be released from state-run institutions and large congregate settings.

In 1992, Community Options opened their first four group homes in New Jersey. From 1995 to 2011, group homes were opened in Pennsylvania, Texas, New York, South Carolina, Kentucky and Tennessee.

The United States House of Representatives honored Community Options for 25 years of service on February 10, 2014. On May 8, 2014, the organization gave Thomas Kean, the 48th governor of New Jersey, its Betty Pendler Award for his years of service dedicated to people with disabilities.

As of 2021, Community Options supports over 4,500 people with disabilities. With approximately 5,000 employees, it is one of the largest nonprofit organizations in New Jersey. Community Options operates over 550 group homes in the country, including 150 in New Jersey and 120 in Pennsylvania.

In 2022, Community Options entered Iowa to transition people from Glenwood Resource Center into the community.

== Cupid's Chase 5K ==
Cupid's Chase 5K is an annual fundraising race presented by Community Options. It takes place every year on the Saturday of Valentine's Day weekend. Cupid's Chase 5K began in Princeton University's Jadwin Gymnasium in 2009. In 2014, Cupid's Chase took place in 24 cities across the country.

In 2020, Under Armour signed a multiyear sponsorship of the race. In 2020, the race took place in 31 cities in the U.S. In 2021, Cupid's Chase is scheduled to take place in 34 cities and will include virtual attendance options, due to ongoing concerns from the COVID-19 pandemic.

== Services ==
Community Options operates several businesses in the United States that employ people with disabilities. Community Options opened Vaseful, a nonprofit flower shop, in 1999. A second shop opened in Princeton in 2019. Employees are responsible for credit card processing, phone orders, shipping, distribution, inventory management and floral arranging.

In 2008, Community Options opened Presents of Mind, a nonprofit gift store. Employees' duties include retail management, point-of-sale software, customer relations skills and store layout. The Daily Plan It is an office and conference space for local businesses. Employees are responsible for customer service and facilities maintenance. The first Daily Plan It opened in Princeton, New Jersey, in 1997 and there are additional Daily Plan It facilities in Morristown, New Jersey, and Wayne, New Jersey. Community Options and the Parents Group opened The Red Ribbon Academy in 2013. The Red Ribbon Academy medical day program provides medical, therapeutic and recreational supports to people with severe developmental disabilities.

== Annual Conference ==
Community Options hosts an annual national conference to discuss services to people with developmental disabilities and traumatic brain injury. In 2024, the conference was held in Santa Fe, NM.

== Betty Pendler Award ==
Starting in 1991, Community Options annually selects a distinguished person who exemplifies the mission of Community Options as the Betty Pendler Award recipient. Pendler was a member of the board of directors for AHRC New York City. Pendler, who died in 2001, was known for her work for people with disabilities as well as raising a daughter with a developmental disability.
