= Gary Trauner =

American politician and businessman

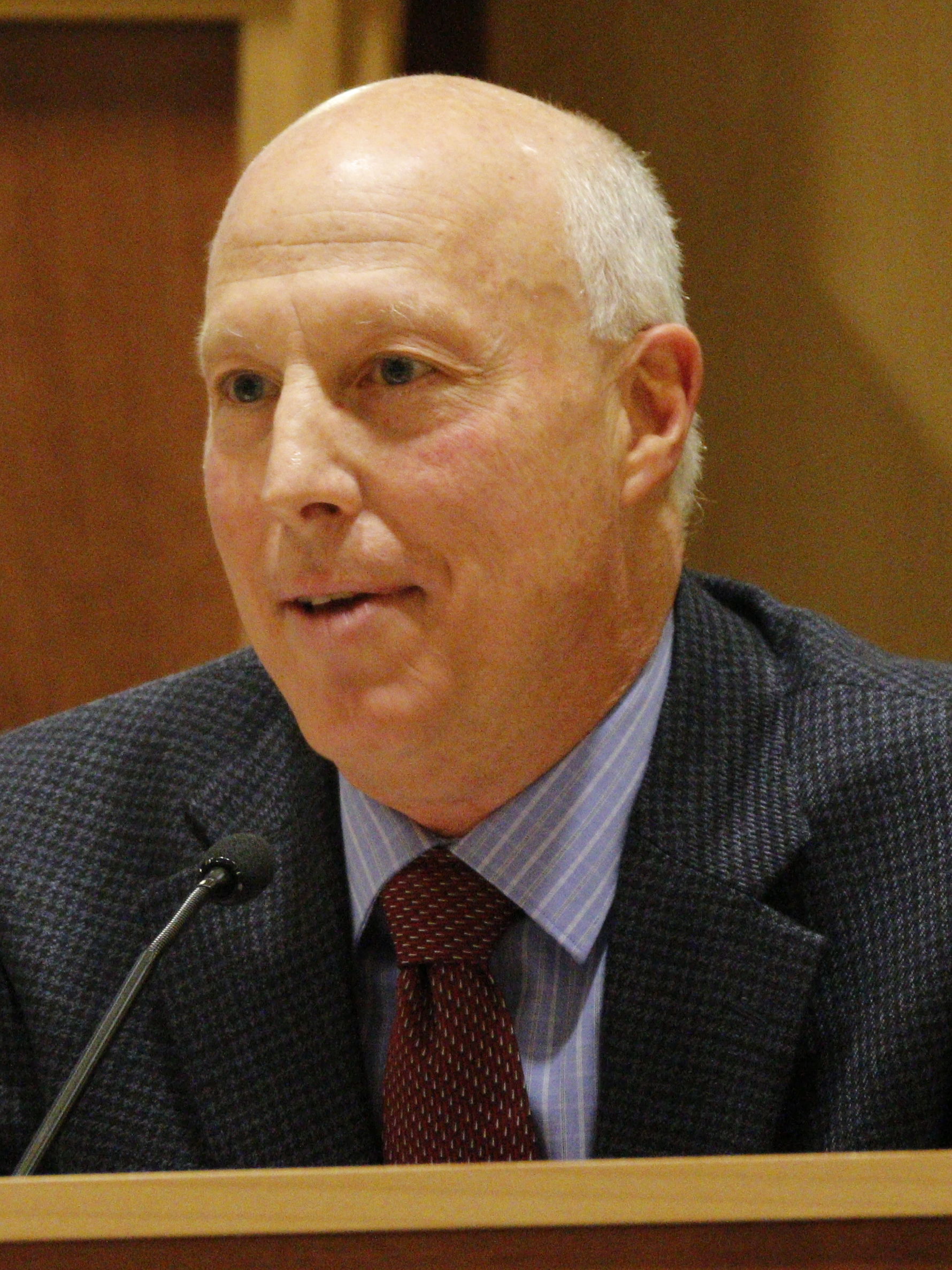
- Trauner in 2018

Personal details
- Born: December 15, 1958 (age 67) Scarsdale, New York, U.S.
- Party: Democratic
- Spouse: Terry Trauner
- Education: Colgate University (BA); New York University (MBA)

Gary S. Trauner (born December 15, 1958) is an American businessman and politician from Wyoming. He was nominated by the Democratic Party in the state's United States House of Representatives elections in 2006 and 2008, as well as in its 2018 U.S. Senate election. He previously chaired the Teton County School District Number 1 Board of Trustees (2006–2008).

== Background ==
Trauner was born and raised in Scarsdale, New York and was raised in a Reform Jewish family. He received a bachelor's degree from Colgate University in Hamilton, New York, and an MBA from the Stern School of Business at New York University in New York City. He first visited Wyoming when he was 13 and permanently moved to the state in 1990. He co-founded and served as Chief Financial Officer of OneWest.net, a regional internet service provider, and later served as the Chief Operating Officer for St. John’s Medical Center in Jackson and as Executive Director of Jackson Hole Lacrosse. He previously served as Vice President of the Teton Trust money management company and founded a dog food company. His dog food company, Mulligan Stew Pet Food, received an honorable mention from Fortune Small Business's business plan competition in 2007.

Trauner lives in Wilson, Wyoming with his wife Terry, who is Catholic. He is the father of two sons.

== Politics ==
=== Teton County politics ===
Trauner served on the Teton County School District Number 1 Board of Trustees from 2002 to 2006, eventually rising to Chair of the Board. Trauner was credited with replacing the district's unpopular Superintendent with Pam Shea under whose leadership saw student test scores rise and teacher salaries go up. Trauner was the Chair of the Aspens Pines Water and Sewer District and his term ended in November 2018. In 2017, Aspens Pines Water and Sewer District won the Gold Award from the 18th Annual Great American Water Taste Test for best-tasting water in the nation. In 2013, Trauner received the Silver Award for Best Politician That Does Not Hold an Office in Planet Jackson Hole Newspaper's annual awards as voted by the local community. Additionally, Trauner also serves as Chair of the Charture Institute, a Jackson-based conservation think-tank founded in 2002. He is the former Vice Chair of the Teton County Pathways Task Force, a nine-member citizen advisory committee appointed by the Town and County, and is a member of the Jackson Hole Land Trust.

=== House elections ===
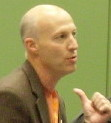
Trauner as a 2008 congressional candidate, attending a session on rural politics during the 2007 Netroots Nation gathering

Trauner ran as the Democratic nominee in the 2006 United States House of Representatives election in Wyoming, and raised nearly as much money in the first quarter of 2006 as the incumbent Representative Barbara Cubin. In the second quarter he raised more money than Cubin and had more cash on hand at the time. By May 2006, a poll had put Trauner within the margin of error. In mid-August, Congressional Quarterly changed their rating of this race from "Republican Favored" to the more competitive "Leans Republican". Trauner narrowly lost 47.8% to Barbara Cubin's 48.3%. Trauner ran for the seat again during the 2008 United States House of Representatives election in Wyoming and was endorsed by Wyoming Governor Dave Freudenthal. He lost in 2008 with 43% of the vote to Cynthia Lummis' 53%.

=== 2018 U.S. Senate election ===
Trauner won the Democratic primary unopposed to run against incumbent United States Senator John Barrasso in the 2018 election.

His goals included "getting big money out of politics," and had pledged not to accept corporate campaign funding from any political action committee. For this reason he was endorsed by End Citizens United. He also criticized Senator Barrasso for his vote to repeal the Patient Protection and Affordable Care Act to "take health care away from 20 million people." He considers "opportunity and inequality" to be the biggest issues facing the nation, and has advocated for the diversification of Wyoming's economy.

In the November election, he lost in a landslide of approximately 37%.

Party political offices
Preceded by Tim Chesnut	Democratic nominee for U.S. Senator from Wyoming (Class 1); 2018	Succeeded by Scott Morrow
