= 2006 United States House of Representatives election in Wyoming =

2006 United States House of Representatives election in Wyoming, At-large district
- November 7, 2006
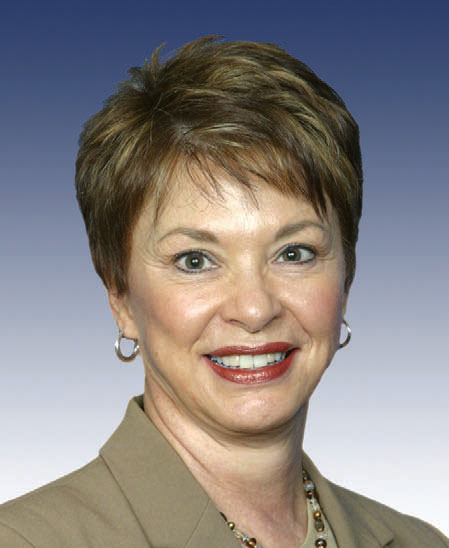

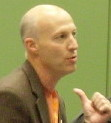
Nominee	Barbara Cubin	Gary Trauner
Party	Republican	Democratic
Popular vote	93,336	92,324
Percentage	48.33%	47.80%
- County results Cubin: 40–50% 50–60% 60–70% 70–80% Trauner: 40–50% 50–60% 60–70%
U.S. Representative before election
Barbara Cubin
Republican
Elected U.S. Representative
Barbara Cubin
Republican

The 2006 United States House of Representatives election in Wyoming was held on November 7, 2006. Incumbent Republican Congresswoman Barbara Cubin ran for re-election. Despite Wyoming's historic tendency to favor Republican candidates, Cubin faced a difficult challenge from businessman Gary Trauner, the Democratic nominee. Cubin ultimately won re-election by a 0.5 percent margin, defeating Trauner by just 1,012 votes.

== Democratic primary ==
=== Candidates ===
- Gary Trauner, businessman

=== Results ===
Democratic primary results
Party	Candidate	Votes	%
Democratic	Gary Trauner	25,914	100.00%
Total votes		25,914	100.00%

== Republican primary ==
=== Candidates ===
- Barbara Cubin, incumbent U.S. representative
- Bill Winney, retired U.S. Navy captain

=== Results ===
Republican primary results
Party	Candidate	Votes	%
Republican	Barbara Cubin (inc.)	50,004	60.04%
Republican	Bill Winney	33,287	39.96%
Total votes		83,291	100.00%

== General election ==
=== Predictions ===
Source	Ranking	As of
The Cook Political Report	Tossup	November 6, 2006
Rothenberg	Likely R	November 6, 2006
Sabato's Crystal Ball	Tilt R	November 6, 2006
Real Clear Politics	Safe R	November 7, 2006
CQ Politics	Tossup	November 7, 2006

=== Results ===
2006 Wyoming's at-large congressional district general election results
Party	Candidate	Votes	%
Republican	Barbara Cubin (inc.)	93,336	48.33%
Democratic	Gary Trauner	92,324	47.80%
Libertarian	Thomas R. Rankin	7,481	3.87%
Total votes		193,141	100.00%
Republican hold			

==== Counties that flipped from Republican to Democratic ====
- Fremont (largest city: Riverton)
- Natrona (largest city: Casper)
- Carbon (largest city: Rawlins)
- Sweetwater (largest city: Rock Springs)
