= Barbara Cubin =

American politician (born 1946)

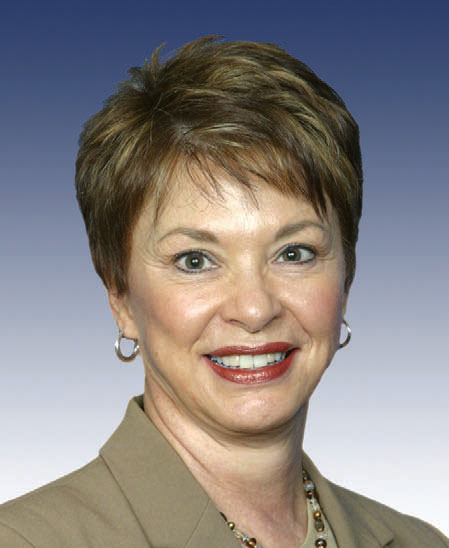
- Official portrait, c. 2005

Secretary of the House Republican Conference
- In office January 3, 2001 – January 3, 2003
- Leader: Dennis Hastert
- Preceded by: Deborah Pryce
- Succeeded by: John Doolittle

Member of the U.S. House of Representatives from Wyoming's at-large district
- In office January 3, 1995 – January 3, 2009
- Preceded by: Craig Thomas
- Succeeded by: Cynthia Lummis

Personal details
- Born: Barbara Lynn Turner; November 30, 1946 (age 79) Salinas, California, U.S.
- Party: Republican
- Spouse: Fritz Cubin (m. 1975; end 2010)
- Children: 2
- Education: Creighton University (BS)

Barbara Lynn Cubin (née Turner; born November 30, 1946) is an American politician who was a Republican member of the United States House of Representatives, Wyoming's sole member of that body. She was the first woman elected to Congress from Wyoming.

== Early life, education ==
Cubin was born in Salinas, California. She grew up in Casper, Wyoming, and graduated from high school there. She received a Bachelor of Science degree in chemistry from Creighton University in Omaha, Nebraska.

Cubin worked as a substitute science and math teacher, and was employed full-time as a social worker for senior citizens and disabled adults. She later worked for the state Labor Department and Ironworkers' Union to train minorities and Vietnam War veterans to become iron workers.

In 1974, Cubin joined the Wyoming Machinery Company as a chemist, and in 1975, began managing the office of her husband, Fritz Cubin, a physician.

== Personal ==
Cubin and her husband Fritz married in 1975 and had two children. Fritz Cubin, who was a doctor, died in 2010 after a decade of serious health problems.

In past elections, Cubin fended off attacks on missed floor votes, which she attributed to her husband's severe health problems. Cubin also has had health issues of her own. In 1993 and 1995, she had surgeries related to her gall bladder. In July 2005, she suffered a mild heart attack and underwent surgery to place a stent in an artery that was 70 percent blocked.

Cubin is an Episcopalian.

== Early political career ==
Cubin began her political career in November 1986, when she was elected to the Wyoming House of Representatives from Natrona County, Wyoming. She served there for from 1987 to 1993. During the 1992 session, she was the primary sponsor of legislation that put on the ballot an initiative that would create the sentence of life without parole.

In November 1992, Cubin was elected to the Wyoming Senate, representing part of Casper, Wyoming in the 29th district. She served there from 1993 to 1995 before being elected to the U.S. House and was succeeded by Bill Hawks.

== U.S. House of Representatives ==
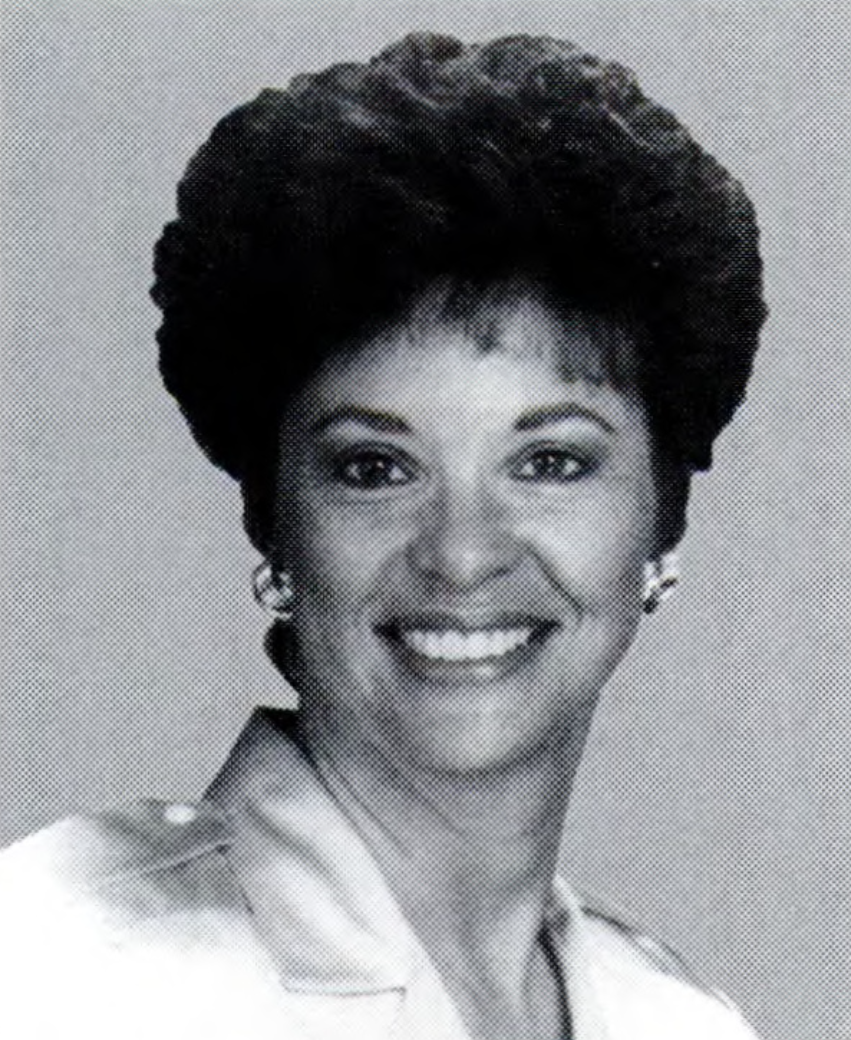
Cubin during the 104th Congress

=== 1994 election ===
In November 1994, Cubin ran for Wyoming's U.S. House seat, to succeed Republican Craig Thomas, who was running for (and would be elected to) the United States Senate. Cubin defeated eight other Republicans in the primary, then won the general election against Bob Schuster, a wealthy Jackson attorney and then-partner of prominent trial attorney Gerry Spence.

Cubin's first race was very close by Wyoming standards (Wyoming is one of the most Republican states in the nation), with Cubin getting 53% of the vote. It was also the most expensive campaign in state history.

Cubin became the first woman to win an election for federal office in the state of Wyoming.

=== Subsequent elections ===
In 1996, Cubin was re-elected with 55 percent. Subsequent races were less close, until 2004, when she again won with 55% of the vote. By contrast, George W. Bush won the state with 69 percent of the vote. In 2006, Cubin won her seat again, but barely, registering 48 percent of the vote to her Democratic opponent Gary Trauner's 48 percent.

=== Committees ===
Early in her House tenure, she served on the House Science Committee. In her last terms in office, she was a member of the House Resources Committee and the House Energy and Commerce Committee. In the wake of the Democratic takeover of Congress in the 2006 elections, Cubin served only on the House Energy and Commerce Committee, as a Member of both the Health and Telecommunications Subcommittees.

=== Political positions ===
Cubin's voting record is conservative: the American Conservative Union gave her 2005 voting record a rating of 96 points out of 100.

An opponent of abortion in any form, Cubin consistently voted for restrictions on abortion and against funding of family planning groups that provide abortion services, counseling or advocacy.

In 2006, Cubin was listed as cosponsoring legislation that would sell off some federal land to help pay for Hurricane Katrina and other disaster relief. Cubin maintains she never signed on to the legislation, saying there must have been a clerical error. About 42 percent of Wyoming's land is owned by the federal government, including Yellowstone and Grand Teton national parks.

Relatedly, she focused much of her attention on the mining and land use issues important to Wyoming. She cofounded the Congressional Mining Caucus and introduced legislation to allow mining companies operating on federal lands to pay taxes in minerals rather than dollars.

With regard to global warming, Cubin has stated that "there still exists broad disagreement within the scientific community on the extent to which humans actually contribute to the Earth's temperature changes."

The League of Conservation Voters, a nonpartisan PAC, gave Cubin a lifetime rating of 3 on a scale of 0 to 100. In 2006, she scored a 0.

In 2000, she was appointed to be a member of the National Rifle Association of America Board of Directors.

During her time in the House, Cubin rose into the ranks of Republican leadership, holding the posts of Deputy Majority Whip, Conference Secretary, and member of the Steering Committee.

Cubin was a supporter of impeaching President Bill Clinton. In November 1997, Cubin was one of eighteen House Republicans to co-sponsor a resolution by Bob Barr that sought to launch an impeachment inquiry against President Clinton. The resolution did not specify any charges or allegations. This was an early effort to impeach Clinton, predating the eruption of the Clinton–Lewinsky scandal. The eruption of that scandal would ultimately lead to a more serious effort to impeach Clinton in 1998. On October 8, 1998, Cubin voted in favor of legislation that was passed to open an impeachment inquiry. On December 19, 1998, Cubin voted in favor of all four proposed articles of impeachment against Clinton (only two of which received the majority of votes needed to be adopted).

== Controversies ==
=== Racial comment ===
On April 9, 2003, Cubin said on the House floor, "My sons are 25 and 30. They are blond-haired and blue-eyed. One amendment today said we could not sell guns to anybody under drug treatment. So does that mean if you go into a black community, you cannot sell a gun to any black person, or does that mean because my …" Representative Melvin Watt, (D-N.C.), who is black, interrupted and demanded that Cubin retract the statement. Cubin said that she did not mean to offend her "neighbors" on the Democratic side, and maintained that her comment was within House rules.

On the motion from Watt to strike Cubin's words, the motion was defeated along mostly party lines of 227 to 195, with 4 Democrats voting with the Republicans.

=== Slap ===
On October 22, 2006, after a televised debate with Democratic candidate Gary Trauner and Libertarian candidate Thomas Rankin, Cubin approached Rankin, who has multiple sclerosis and is a wheelchair user. Rankin states that Cubin said, "If you weren't sitting in that chair, I'd slap you across the face." Rankin called her comment an inappropriate slur to the disabled. Rankin maintains he said nothing to Cubin before her remark.

=== ARMPAC ===
The Wyoming Democratic Party has repeatedly called for Cubin to return the $22,520 she received from Tom DeLay's Americans for a Republican Majority political action committee (ARMPAC).

On July 23, 2006 the Casper Star-Tribune reported Cubin "will keep the money she received from former Rep. Tom DeLay's fundraising committee even though the organization has been fined for campaign finance violations and is shutting down." ARMPAC agreed to pay a fine to the Federal Election Commission for "misstatements of financial activity, failure to report debts and obligations and failure to properly allocate expenses between federal and non-federal accounts."" Later in 2006, Cubin said she would return the money if DeLay was convicted. DeLay was convicted, though his conviction was reversed on appeal in 2013 by Texas Republican judges.

== 2008 retirement ==
Cubin announced in 2008 that she would not be a candidate for re-election that year. Former Wyoming State Treasurer Cynthia Lummis became the Republican nominee for Wyoming's At-Large U.S. House District. After her victory in the general election, Lummis succeeded Cubin in the U.S. House of Representatives.

== Electoral history ==
Wyoming’s at-large congressional district election – 1994
Party	Candidate	Votes	%
Republican	Barbara Cubin	104,426	53.23
Democratic	Bob Schuster	81,022	41.30
Libertarian	Dave Dawson	10,749	5.48

Wyoming’s at-large congressional district election – 1996
Party	Candidate	Votes	%
Republican	Barbara Cubin (incumbent)	116,004	55.24
Democratic	Pete Maxfield	85,724	40.82
Libertarian	Dave Dawson	8,255	3.93

Wyoming’s at-large congressional district election – 1998
Party	Candidate	Votes	%
Republican	Barbara Cubin (incumbent)	100,687	57.79
Democratic	Scott Farris	67,399	38.69
Libertarian	Steve Richardson	6,133	3.52

Wyoming’s at-large congressional district election – 2000
Party	Candidate	Votes	%
Republican	Barbara Cubin (incumbent)	141,848	66.81
Democratic	Michael Allen Green	60,638	28.56
Libertarian	Lewis Stock	6,411	3.02
Natural Law	Victor Raymond	3,415	1.61

Wyoming’s at-large congressional district election – 2002
Party	Candidate	Votes	%
Republican	Barbara Cubin (incumbent)	110,229	60.52
Democratic	Ron Akin	65,961	36.21
Libertarian	Lewis Stock	5,962	3.27

Wyoming’s at-large congressional district election – 2004
Party	Candidate	Votes	%
Republican	Barbara Cubin (incumbent)	131,682	55.28
Democratic	Ted Ladd	99,982	41.97
Libertarian	Lewis Stock	6,553	2.75

Wyoming’s at-large congressional district election – 2006
Party	Candidate	Votes	%
Republican	Barbara Cubin (incumbent)	93,336	48.33
Democratic	Gary Trauner	92,324	47.80
Libertarian	Thom Rankin	7,481	3.87

== See also ==
- Women in the United States House of Representatives

U.S. House of Representatives
Preceded by Craig Thomas	Member of the U.S. House of Representatives from Wyoming's at-large congressional district 1995–2009	Succeeded by Cynthia Lummis
Party political offices
Preceded by Deborah Pryce	Secretary of the House Republican Conference; 2001–2003	Succeeded by John Doolittle
U.S. order of precedence (ceremonial)
Preceded by Dave Reichert as Former U.S. Representative	Order of precedence of the United States as Former U.S. Representative	Succeeded by Jim Matheson as Former U.S. Representative
