= 2026 Wyoming Superintendent of Public Instruction election =

- November 3, 2026
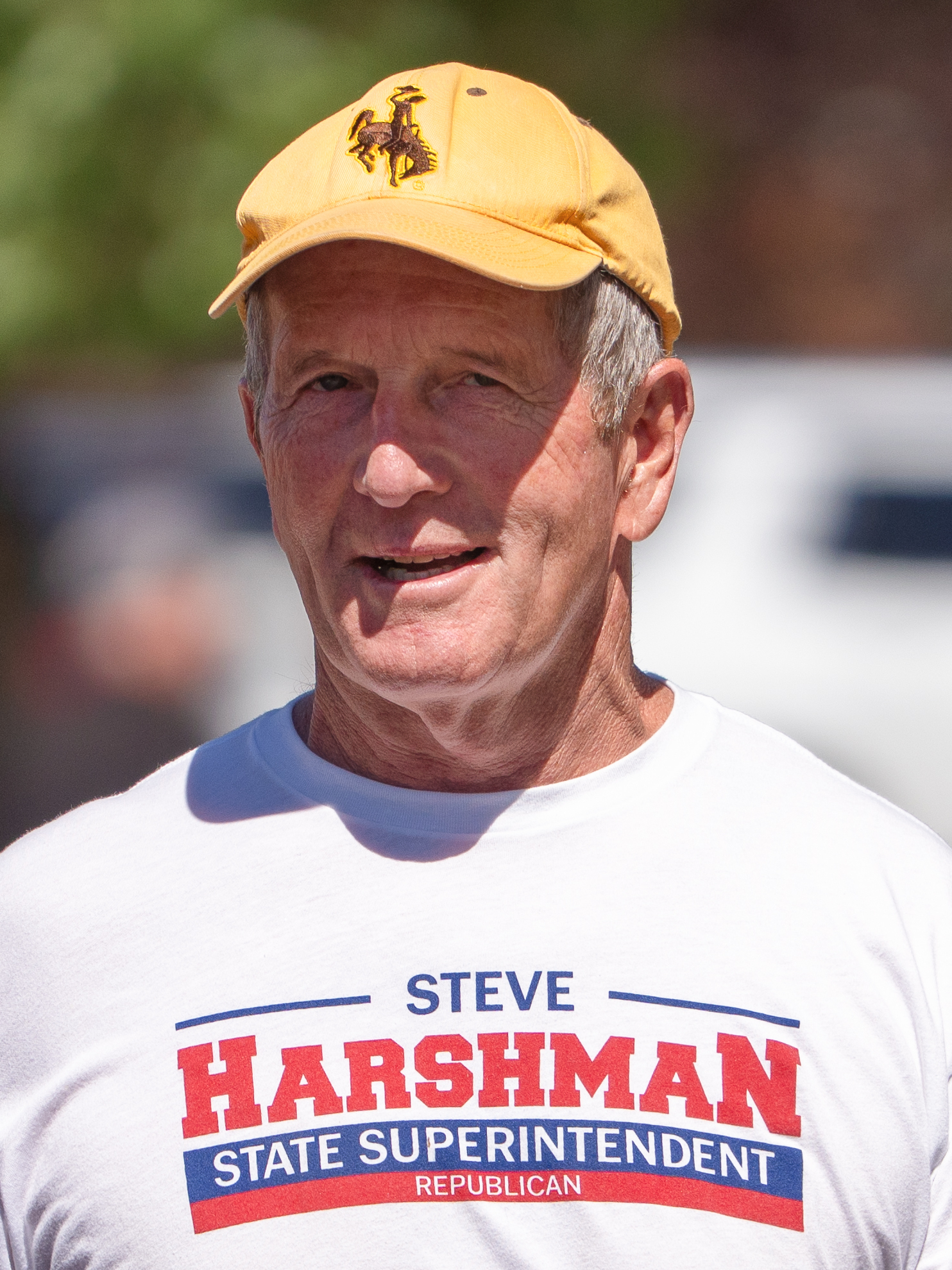

Nominee	Steve Harshman	Ana Cordova
Party	Republican	Democratic
Popular vote	136,744	45,318
Percentage	75.1%	24.9%
Superintendent of Public Instruction before election
Megan Degenfelder
Republican
Elected Superintendent of Public Instruction
Steve Harshman
Republican

The 2026 Wyoming State Superintendent of Public Instruction election was held on November 3, 2026, to elect the Superintendent of Public Instruction, concurrently with elections to the United States Senate, U.S. House of Representatives, governor, and other state and local elections. Primary elections were held on August 18, 2026. Incumbent Republican superintendent Megan Degenfelder chose to not seek election to a second term, instead running in that year's governor race.

In the general election, Republican nominee Steve Harshman defeated Democratic nominee Ana Cordova.

Primary elections were contested, with Harshman facing challenges in the Republican primary from fellow state representative Tom Kelly and political advisor Chad Auer; while Cordova in the Democratic primary was challenged by Wind River education director Sergio Maldonado.

== Republican primary ==
=== Candidates ===
==== Nominee ====
- Steve Harshman, former Speaker of the Wyoming House of Representatives (2017–2021) from the 37th district (2003–present)

==== Eliminated in primary ====
- Chad Auer, former policy advisor to Mark Gordon and former mayor of Firestone, Colorado
- Tom Kelly, state representative from the 30th district (2025–present) and candidate for superintendent in 2022

==== Declined ====
- Megan Degenfelder, incumbent superintendent (ran for governor)

=== Endorsements ===
Steve Harshman

Labor unions

- Wyoming Education Association Political Action Committee for Education
Tom Kelly

State legislators

- Mark Jennings, former state representative from the 30th district (2015–2025)

Political parties

- Wyoming Republican Party

=== Results ===
Primary results by county: Harshman: 50–60%; 60–70%

Republican primary results
Party	Candidate	Votes	%
Republican	Steve Harshman	67,784	57.9
Republican	Tom Kelly	36,624	31.3
Republican	Chad Auer	12,636	10.8
Total votes		117,044	100.0

== Democratic primary ==
=== Candidates ===
==== Nominee ====
- Ana Cordova, nonprofit leader

==== Eliminated in primary ====
- Sergio Maldonado, Northern Arapaho tribal education director, nominee for Wyoming's 25th State Senate district in 2014 and 2018, nominee for Wyoming's 33rd House of Representatives district in 2016, and nominee for superintendent in 2022

=== Results ===
Primary results by county: Cordova: 50–60%; 60–70%; 70–80%; Maldonado: 50–60%; 60–70%

Democratic primary results
Party	Candidate	Votes	%
Democratic	Ana Cordova	7,300	62.9
Democratic	Sergio Maldonado	4,314	37.1
Total votes		11,614	100.0
