= 2026 in Wyoming =

- Decades: 2000s; 2010s; 2020s
- See also: History of Wyoming; Historical outline of Wyoming; List of years in Wyoming; 2026 in the United States

The following is a list of events of the year 2026 in Wyoming.

== Incumbents ==
=== State government ===
- Governor: Mark Gordon (R)

== Events ==
- January 6 – The State Supreme Court strikes down a law that banned abortion pills in Wyoming, ruling that the law violates the state constitution.
- March 4 – The Nuclear Regulatory Commission approves a construction for a commercial nuclear reactor set to be built by TerraPower near Kemmerer. It is the first commercial nuclear reactor permit approved by the NRC in eight years.
- March 9 – Governor Gordon signs a law that bans all abortions after embryotic cardiac activity can be detected.
- July 10 – A bison charges into a man at a Yellowstone National Park campground, injuring him.
- August 18 – Monitors from the Department of Justice visit six polling sites in Cheyenne, asking to interview voters and inspect machines, though they are denied access. Governor Gordon later expresses concern over the DoJ's inspections.
- September 13 – A Sikh truck driver is stabbed at a rest stop in rural Sweetwater County. The suspect, another truck driver, is arrested the same day.
- September 26 – A baseball game is proposed by the Major League Baseball to be held in Grand Teton National Park.
- October 12 – The Laramie County permit request for the Laramie Range Wind Project is paused to allow more time to meet requirements of the Wyoming Industrial Siting Council.
- November 3: 2026 Wyoming elections:
  - 2026 United States Senate election in Wyoming: Harriet Hageman wins the election.
  - 2026 Wyoming House of Representatives election
  - 2026 Wyoming local elections
  - 2026 Wyoming Senate election
  - 2026 Wyoming gubernatorial election: Eric Barlow wins the election.
  - 2026 United States House of Representatives election in Wyoming: Chuck Gray wins the election.

== See also ==
- 2026 in the United States
