= James W. Byrd =

American politician (born 1954)

James Byrd
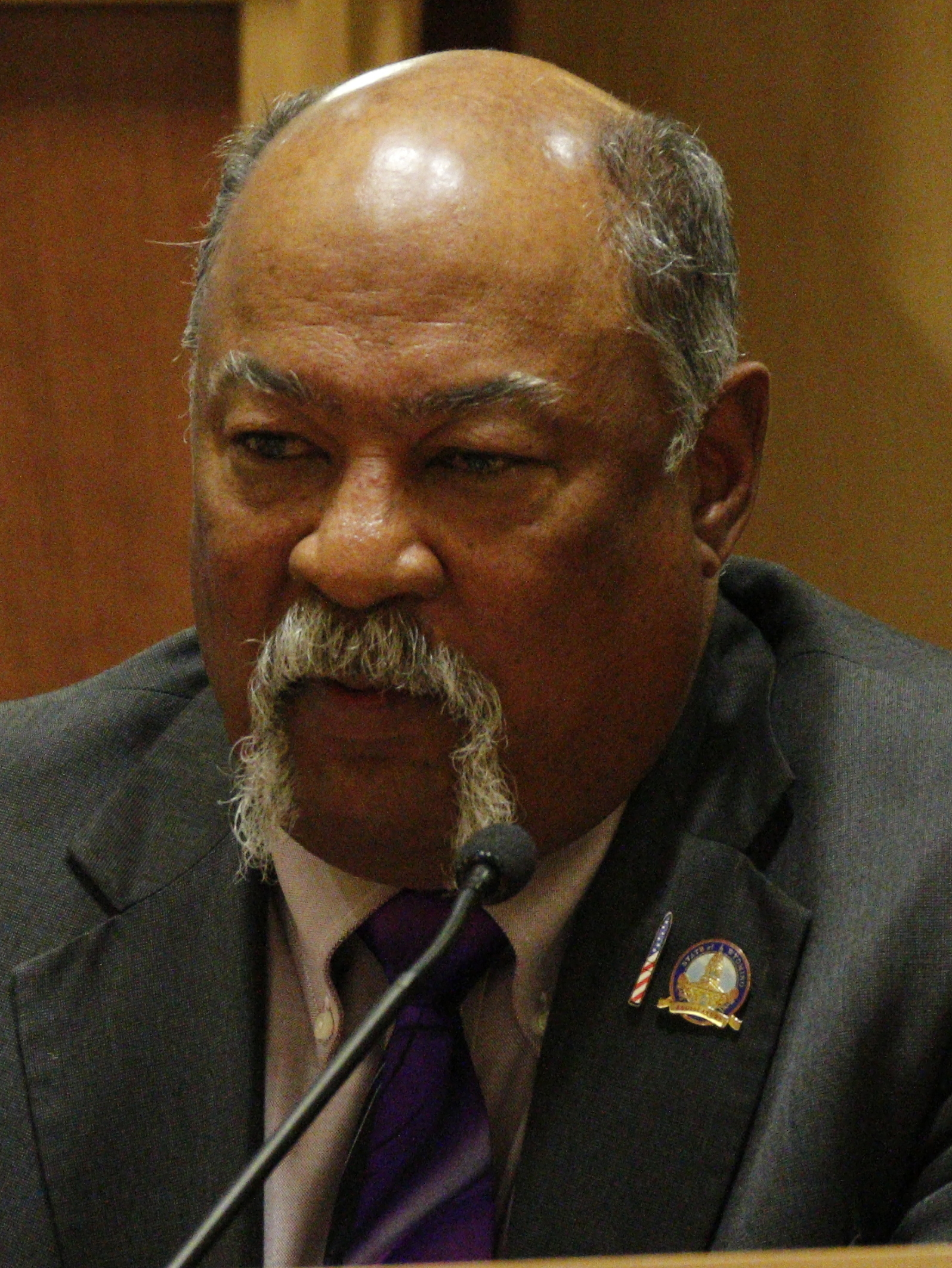
- Byrd in 2018

Member of the Wyoming House of Representatives from the 44th district
- In office January 13, 2009 – January 7, 2019
- Preceded by: Floyd Esquibel
- Succeeded by: Sara Burlingame

Personal details
- Born: March 14, 1954 (age 72) Cheyenne, Wyoming, U.S.
- Party: Democratic
- Parent: Liz Byrd (mother)
- Education: Laramie County Community College (attended); University of Wyoming (BA)
- Website: Campaign website

James W. Byrd II (born March 14, 1954) is an American politician and former Democratic member of the Wyoming House of Representatives, representing the 44th district from 2009 to 2019. Byrd retired from his House of Representatives seat to run for Wyoming Secretary of State shortly after Republican incumbent Ed Murray resigned, but lost the November 2018 election to Murray's successor Edward Buchanan.

In February 2026, he announced his candidacy for the 2026 United States Senate election in Wyoming. He won the Democratic nomination on August 18, but ultimately lost in the general election to Republican nominee Harriet Hageman.

Byrd's father, also called James (1925–2005), was born in Newark, New Jersey, and moved to Wyoming after being posted to Warren Air Force Base after World War II. He joined Cheyenne's police force in 1949 and became its first black chief in 1966. His mother, Harriet Elizabeth Byrd (1926–2015), was a longtime teacher who held the 44th district's seat (the same one which Byrd held) from 1980 to 1988, and was the first African-American to serve in the Wyoming State Legislature.

Byrd graduated from Cheyenne Central High School in 1972, and studied at Laramie County Community College and the University of Wyoming. He began his career as a geophysicist technician in the 1980s before transitioning into the cybersecurity sector, where he worked as an analyst. Since 2012, he has served as president of the Southeast Wyoming Economic Development District.

== Political position ==
In an 2026 interview in Jackson Hole News&Guide, Byrd presented the following healthcare policies:

1. Federal lawmakers should protect and stabilize our rural healthcare system by safeguarding support programs and critical access designations. Ensuring small, rural facilities have flexible federal funding prevents closures that create healthcare deserts on Main Street.
2. Congress can lower out-of-pocket expenses by pushing for transparent medical pricing, capping soaring prescription drug costs, and protecting consumer-friendly provisions in federal health insurance markets to relieve the strain on family budgets.
3. Expand local care options by increasing federal investments in broadband infrastructure and making telehealth reimbursements permanent, allowing rural residents to access specialists without driving hundreds of miles.

Party political offices
Preceded by Merav Ben-David	Democratic nominee for U.S. Senator from Wyoming (Class 2); 2026	Most recent
