= Britney Tennant =

American politician

Member-elect of the Wyoming House of Representatives from the 11th district
- Assuming office January 2027
- Succeeding: Jacob Wasserburger

Personal details
- Party: Democratic
- Education: University of Wyoming; Regis University

Britney Tennant is an American politician and businesswoman. A Democrat, she is a member-elect of the Wyoming House of Representatives from the 11th district. She is also the chief executive officer of Cheyenne Animal Shelter, an animal shelter based in Cheyenne, Wyoming.

== Career ==
In 2008, Tennant founded Black Dog Animal Rescue. She became CEO of Cheyenne Animal Shelter in 2021.

In 2020, she unsuccessfully ran for Wyoming's 6th State Senate district.

In 2026, Tennant won election to the Wyoming House of Representatives, defeating Republican Dan McIntosh and Libertarian Ryan Schollenberger to succeed retiring Republican incumbent Jacob Wasserburger in the 11th district.

== Education ==
Tennant graduated from Cheyenne Central High School. She studied animal science and zoology at the University of Wyoming, and has a Master's degree in nonprofit management from Regis University.
