= John Romero-Martinez =

American politician

Member of the Wyoming House of Representatives from the 44th district
- In office January 4, 2021 – January 2, 2023
- Preceded by: Sara Burlingame
- Succeeded by: Tamara Trujillo

Personal details
- Born: John Benedict Romero-Martinez Cheyenne, Wyoming, U.S.
- Party: Republican
- Education: Laramie County Community College (AA)

John Benedict Romero-Martinez is an American politician who served as a member of the Wyoming House of Representatives for the 44th district from 2021 to 2023, the 66th Session of the Wyoming House of Representatives. Representative John B. Romero-Martinez was elected as a representatives for the newly drawn 44th district serving from 2023 to 2025.

== Background ==
Romero-Martinez was born and raised in Cheyenne, Wyoming. He earned an associate of arts degree in sociology from the University of Wyoming.
