= Steve Harshman =

American politician

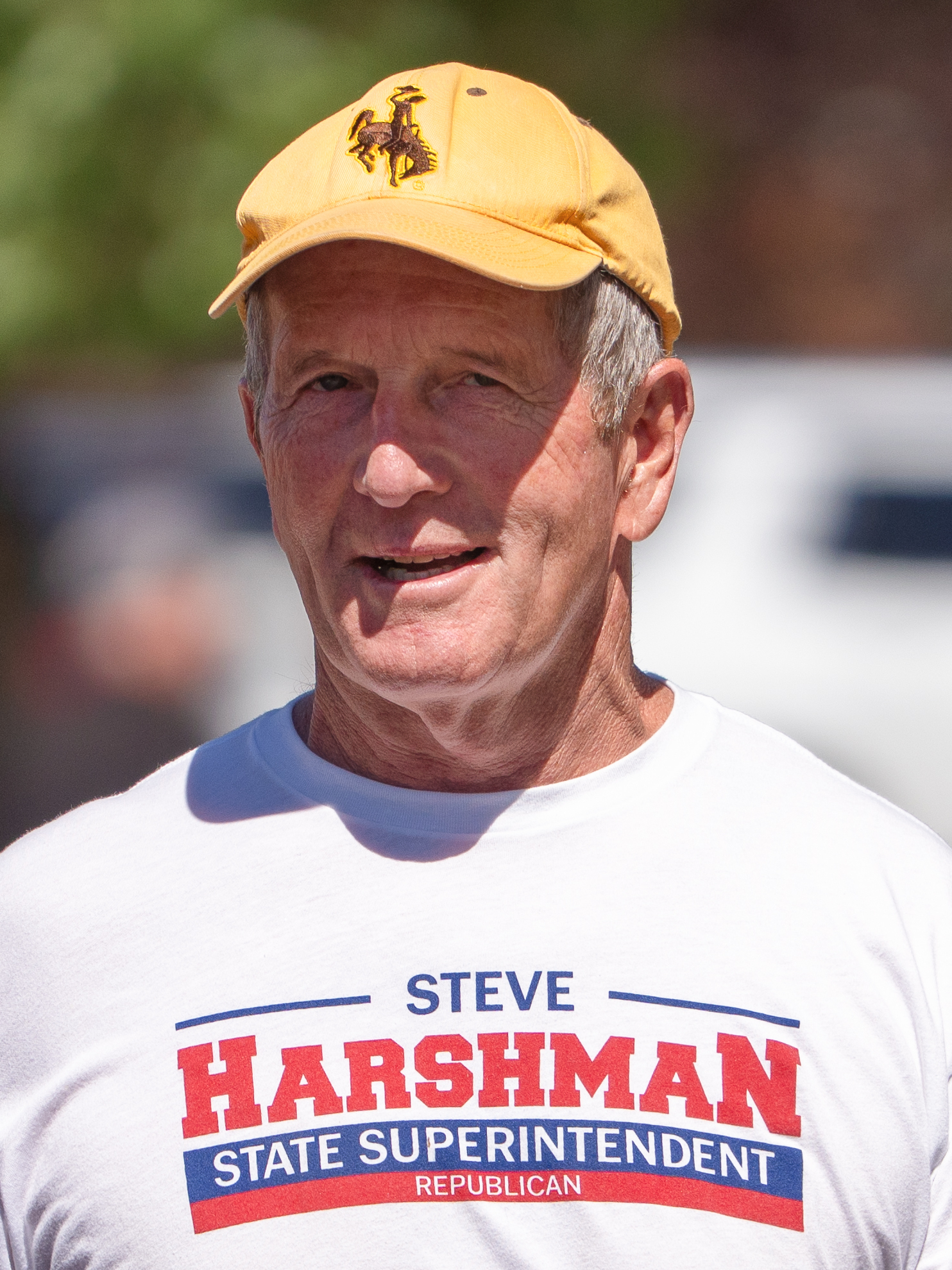
- Harshman in 2026

Wyoming State Superintendent of Public Instruction-elect
- Assuming office January 4, 2027
- Succeeding: Megan Degenfelder

64th Speaker of the Wyoming House of Representatives
- In office January 10, 2017 – January 12, 2021
- Preceded by: Kermit Brown
- Succeeded by: Eric Barlow

Member of the Wyoming House of Representatives from the 37th district
- Incumbent
- Assumed office January 14, 2003
- Preceded by: Rick Tempest
- Succeeded by: Brian Costello (elect)

Personal details
- Born: 1963 or 1964 (age 62–63) Casper, Wyoming, U.S.
- Party: Republican
- Spouse: Becky Harshman
- Children: 4
- Education: Black Hills State University (BS); Oregon State University (MEd)
- Harshman's voice Harshman at a House Revenue Committee meeting. Recorded February 23, 2023

Steve Harshman (born 1963/1964) is an American politician who is the Wyoming State Superintendent of Public Instruction-elect. He is also a Republican member of the Wyoming House of Representatives representing District 37 since January 14, 2003. Harshman served as the Speaker of the Wyoming House from January 2017 to January 2021. He is the most senior member of the state house.

== Education ==
Harshman earned his Bachelor of Science in education from Black Hills State University and his Master of Education from Oregon State University.

== Elections ==
- 2002 - When incumbent Republican Speaker of the House Rick Tempest was term-limited (since repealed), Harshman won the Republican primary with 47.6% of the vote. Harshman defeated Democratic nominee Jo Koch with 62.2% of the vote.
- 2004 - Harshman defeated Kathy Martin in the Republican primary with 69.4% of the vote. He defeated Democratic nominee Scott Koenekamp with 70% of the vote.
- 2006 - Harshman defeated Nick Mandis in the Republican primary with 82.0% of the vote. He defeated 2004 Democratic nominee Scott Koenekamp in the general election with 70.2% of the vote.
- 2008 - Harshman ran unopposed in both the Republican primary and general election.
- 2010 - Harshman ran unopposed in both the Republican primary and general election.
- 2012 - Harshman defeated Steve Bray in the Republican primary with 68.5% of the vote and ran unopposed in the general election.
- 2014 - Harshman defeated Greg Flesvig in the Republican primary with 70% of the vote. He then defeated independent candidate Anthony Allen in the general election with 73% of the vote.
- 2016 - Harshman defeated Greg Flesvig with 74% of the vote in a rematch of the 2014 Republican primary. Harshman defeated Democrat Deirdre Stoelzle in the general election with 80% of the vote. In November 2016, the Wyoming House Republican Caucus nominated Harshman to be Speaker of the Wyoming House of Representatives. Harshman will succeed Kermit Brown, who is retiring.

Political offices
Preceded by Kermit Brown	Speaker of the Wyoming House of Representatives; 2017–2021	Succeeded by Eric Barlow
