= 2026 United States Senate election in Wyoming =

- November 3, 2026
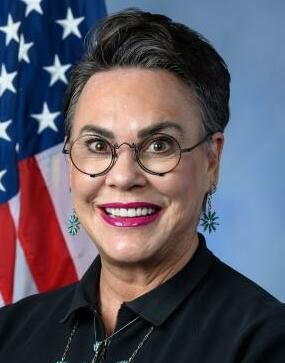

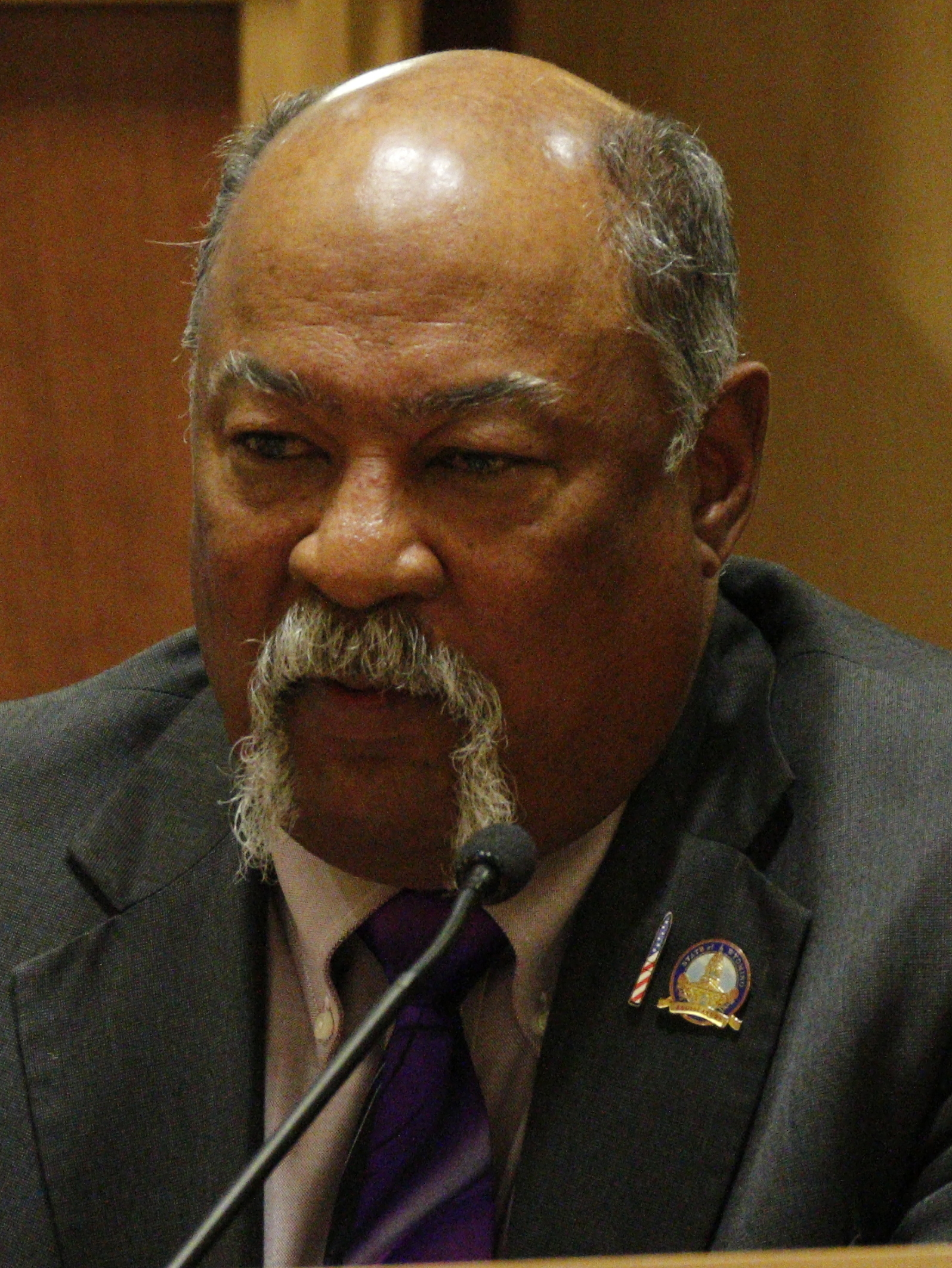
Nominee	Harriet Hageman	James W. Byrd
Party	Republican	Democratic
Popular vote	122,174	65,105
Percentage	64.88%	34.57%
- County results Hageman: 50–60% 60–70% 70–80% 80–90% Byrd: 50–60% 70–80%
U.S. senator before election
Cynthia Lummis
Republican
Elected U.S. senator
Harriet Hageman
Republican

The 2026 United States Senate election in Wyoming was held on November 3, 2026, to elect a member of the United States Senate to represent the state of Wyoming. Republican representative Harriet Hageman defeated Democratic former state representative James W. Byrd. Republican incumbent Cynthia Lummis did not seek a second term.

Primary elections were held on August 18. In the Republican primary, Hageman won the nomination with 64.9% of the vote against former Kirby mayor Sam Mead. Byrd won the Democratic nomination with 79.3% of the vote, facing minimal opposition.

Despite Hageman's convincing victory, Byrd's 34.57% share of the vote represents the best Democratic performance in a US Senate election in the state since 1996, surpassing the previous 30.10% share posted by Gary Trauner in 2018. Byrd also flipped Albany County to the Democrats for the first time since 2018.

== Republican primary ==
=== Candidates ===
==== Nominee ====
- Harriet Hageman, U.S. representative from Wyoming's at-large congressional district (2023–present)

==== Eliminated in primary ====
- Jill M. Edwards, massage therapist
- John A. Holtz, retired circuit court judge and candidate for U.S. Senate in 2018, 2020 and 2024
- Sam Mead, former mayor of Kirby, nephew of former governor of Wyoming Matt Mead, and great-grandson of former U.S. senator Clifford Hansen
- Jimmy Skovgard, Wyoming Army National Guard veteran

==== Declined ====
- Cynthia Lummis, incumbent U.S. senator (2021–present) (endorsed Hageman)
- Mark Gordon, governor of Wyoming

=== Endorsements ===
Harriet Hageman

Executive branch officials

- Donald Trump, president of the United States (2017–2021, 2025–present) (previously endorsed Lummis)

U.S. senators

- John Barrasso, Wyoming (2007–present)
- Cynthia Lummis, Wyoming (2021–present)

U.S. representatives

- David McIntosh, former IN-2 (1995–2001)

Statewide officials

- Megan Degenfelder, Wyoming superintendent of public instruction (2023–present)
- Chuck Gray, Wyoming secretary of state (2023–present)

State legislators

- Chip Neiman, speaker of the Wyoming House of Representatives (2025–present) from HD-01 (2021–present)

Organizations

- AIPAC (previously endorsed Lummis)
- American Conservation Coalition
- Club for Growth PAC
- Maggie's List
- Senate Conservatives Fund (previously endorsed Lummis)
- Turning Point Action
- U.S. Chamber of Commerce

State Parties

- Wyoming Republican Party
Cynthia Lummis (declined)

Executive branch officials

- ~~Donald Trump, 45th and 47th president of the United States (2017–2021, 2025–present)~~ (switched endorsement to Hageman)

U.S. senators

- Ted Cruz, Texas (2013–present)
- Mike Lee, Utah (2011–present)
- Bernie Moreno, Ohio (2025–present)
- Rick Scott, Florida (2019–present)
- Eric Schmitt, Missouri (2023–present)
- Roger Marshall, Kansas (2021–present)

Organizations

- ~~AIPAC~~ (switched endorsement to Hageman)
- ~~Senate Conservatives Fund~~ (switched endorsement to Hageman)

=== Fundraising ===
Italics indicate a declined candidate.

Campaign finance reports as of June 30, 2026
Candidate	Raised	Spent	Cash on hand
Harriet Hageman (R)	$2,023,907	$1,943,028	$963,842
Source: Federal Election Commission

=== Debate ===
2026 United States Senate election in Wyoming Republican primary debate
No.	Date	Host	Moderator	Link	Republican	Republican	Republican	Republican	Republican
Key: P Participant A Absent N Not invited I Invited W Withdrawn									
Key: P Participant A Absent N Not invited I Invited W Withdrawn					Jill Edwards	Harriet Hageman	John Holtz	Sam Mead	Jimmy Skovgard
1	Aug. 13, 2026	Central Wyoming College; Cowboy State Daily; Wyoming PBS; Wyoming Public Media	Steve Peck	YouTube	A	P	P	P	P

=== Results ===
Primary results by county: Hageman: 40–50%; 60–70%; 70–80%; 80–90%; Mead: 70–80%

Republican primary results
Party	Candidate	Votes	%
Republican	Harriet Hageman	83,807	64.9
Republican	Sam Mead	35,879	27.8
Republican	Jimmy Skovgard	3,527	2.7
Republican	Jill M. Edwards	3,431	2.7
Republican	John A. Holtz	2,539	2.0
Total votes		129,183	100.0

== Democratic primary ==
=== Candidates ===
==== Nominee ====
- James Byrd, former state representative from the 44th district (2009–2019) and nominee for secretary of state in 2018

==== Eliminated in primary ====
- Billy Benavidez, landscaper

=== Fundraising ===
Campaign finance reports as of June 30, 2026
Candidate	Raised	Spent	Cash on hand
James Byrd (D)	$19,575	$18,376	$1,689
Source: Federal Election Commission

=== Debate ===
2026 United States Senate election in Wyoming Democratic primary debate
No.	Date	Host	Moderator	Link	Democratic	Democratic
Key: P Participant A Absent N Not invited I Invited W Withdrawn						
Key: P Participant A Absent N Not invited I Invited W Withdrawn					Billy Benavidez	James Byrd
1	Aug. 13, 2026	Central Wyoming College; Cowboy State Daily; Wyoming PBS; Wyoming Public Media	Steve Peck	YouTube	P	P

=== Results ===
Primary results by county: Byrd: 60–70%; 70–80%; 80–90%; >90%

Democratic primary results
Party	Candidate	Votes	%
Democratic	James Byrd	9,591	79.3
Democratic	Billy Benavidez	2,499	20.7
Total votes		12,090	100.0

== General election ==
=== Predictions ===
Source	Ranking	As of
The Cook Political Report	Solid R	November 2, 2026
Decision Desk HQ	Safe R	November 3, 2026
The Economist (Note: The Economist's prediction model uses unconventional terminology. For the purpose of equivalency, their "Very Likely" ratings are formatted as a "Likely" rating while "Likely" ratings are formatted as a "Lean" rating.)	Safe R	November 3, 2026
FiftyPlusOne	Safe R	November 3, 2026
Fox News	Solid R	November 1, 2026
Inside Elections	Solid R	October 29, 2026
MS NOW	Safe R	October 29, 2026
NBC News	Solid R	November 3, 2026
RealClearPolitics	Solid R	November 2, 2026
Sabato's Crystal Ball	Safe R	November 2, 2026
Silver Bulletin	Solid R	November 3, 2026
Split Ticket	Safe R	November 2, 2026

=== Fundraising ===
Campaign finance reports as of October 14, 2026
Candidate	Raised	Spent	Cash on hand
Harriet Hageman (R)	$2,810,754	$3,254,295	$439,422
James W. Byrd (D)	$53,560	$46,561	$7,927
Source: Federal Election Commission

=== Results ===
2026 United States Senate election in Wyoming
Party	Candidate	Votes	%	±%
Republican	Harriet Hageman	122,174	64.88	−7.97
Democratic	James Byrd	65,105	34.57	+7.81
Write-in		1,039	0.55	+0.16
Total votes		188,318	100.0	
Republican hold				

County that flipped from Republican to Democratic

- Albany (largest municipality: Laramie)
