= 2026 Wyoming gubernatorial election =

- November 3, 2026

| Nominee | Eric Barlow | Rebecca Bextel | Kenneth Casner |
| Party | Republican | Constitution | Democratic |
| Popular vote | 128,496 | 31,444 | 27,472 |
| Percentage | 68.12% | 16.67% | 14.56% |
- Barlow: 40–50% 50–60% 60–70% 70–80% 80–90% Bextel: 40–50% Casner: 40–50% 50–60% Tie: 40–50% 50% No data
Governor before election
Mark Gordon
Republican
Elected Governor
Eric Barlow
Republican

The 2026 Wyoming gubernatorial election was held on November 3, 2026, to elect the governor of Wyoming. Republican state senator Eric Barlow defeated Constitution nominee Rebecca Bextel and Democratic perennial candidate Kenneth Casner with 68.1% of the vote. Republican incumbent Mark Gordon was term-limited and thus ineligible to seek a third consecutive term.

Primary elections took place on August 18, 2026. Barlow defeated state superintendent Megan Degenfelder in the Republican primary with 45.1% of the vote. Casner secured the Democratic nomination unopposed.

Democrats have not won a statewide election in Wyoming since 2006. As a result of the Constitution Party getting more than 10% in this race, it will become a major party in the state. This is the first time a Democratic gubernatorial candidate has not finished in the top two since Wyoming gained statehood.

== Republican primary ==
=== Candidates ===
==== Nominee ====
- Eric Barlow, state senator from the 23rd district (2023–present)

==== Eliminated in primary ====
- Brent Bien, retired U.S. Marine Corps colonel and candidate for governor in 2022
- Megan Degenfelder, Wyoming Superintendent of Public Instruction (2023–present)
- Curt Blake, rodeo-production professional

==== Disqualified ====
- Ozzie Knezovich, former Spokane County, Washington Sheriff (2006–2022) (ineligible due to residency requirements)

==== Declined ====
- Chuck Gray, Wyoming Secretary of State (2023–present) (ran for U.S. house)
- Harriet Hageman, U.S. representative for Wyoming's at-large congressional district (2023–present) and candidate for governor in 2018 (ran for U.S. senate; endorsed Degenfelder)
- Curt Meier, Wyoming State Treasurer (2019–present) (ran for re-election)
- Kristi Racines, Wyoming State Auditor (2019–present) (ran for re-election)
- Reid Rasner, financial executive and candidate for U.S. Senate in 2024 (ran for U.S. house)

=== Endorsements ===
Eric Barlow

State legislators

- Tony Ross, former president of the Wyoming Senate (2013–2014) from SD-04 (2005–2017)

Organizations

- Associated General Contractors of Wyoming
Brent Bien

State legislators

- Ken Pendergraft, HD-29 (2023–present)

Political parties

- Wyoming Republican Party
Megan Degenfelder

Executive branch officials

- Donald Trump, president of the United States (2017–2021, 2025–present)

U.S. representatives

- Harriet Hageman, WY-AL (2023–present)

State legislators

- Ocean Andrew, HD-46 (2021–present)
- Eli Bebout, former president of the Wyoming Senate (2017–2019) from SD-26 (2007–2021)
- Jeremy Haroldson, house speaker pro tempore (2025–present) from HD-04 (2021–present)
- Scott Heiner, house majority leader (2025–present) from HD-18 (2021–present)
- Bruce Hinchey, SD-27 (1999–2002)
- Diemer True, former president of the Wyoming Senate (1991–1993) from SD-18 (1977–1993)

Organizations

- Wyoming Right to Life
Mark Gordon (term-limited)

State legislators

- Cale Case, SD-25 (1999–present)

=== Polling ===
| Poll source | Date(s) administered | Sample size (Note: Key: A – all adults RV – registered voters LV – likely voters V – unclear) | Margin of error | Brent Bien | Eric Barlow | Megan Degenfelder | Other | Undecided |
|---|---|---|---|---|---|---|---|---|
| Pulse Decision Science (R) (Note: Poll sponsored by Barlow's campaign.) | Jul 18–20, 2026 | 400 (LV) | – | 14% | 42% | 19% | – | 22% |

=== Debate ===
2026 Wyoming gubernatorial election Republican primary debate
| No. | Date | Host | Moderator | Link | Republican | Republican | Republican | Republican |
| Key: P Participant A Absent N Not invited I Invited W Withdrawn | | | | | | | | |
| Key: P Participant A Absent N Not invited I Invited W Withdrawn | | | | | Brent Bien | Eric Barlow | Megan Degenfelder | Curt Blake |
|---|---|---|---|---|---|---|---|---|
| 1 | Jun. 1, 2026 | Campbell County Republican Party | | YouTube | P | A | P | N |
| 2 | Jun. 18, 2026 | Wyoming Republican Party | | YouTube | P | P | P | N |
| 3 | Aug. 13, 2026 | Central Wyoming College; Cowboy State Daily; Wyoming PBS; Wyoming Public Media | Steve Peck | YouTube | P | P | P | N |

=== Results ===
Primary results by county: Barlow: 30–40%; 40–50%; 50–60%; 70–80%

Republican primary results
| Party | Candidate | Votes | % |
|---|---|---|---|
| Republican | Eric Barlow | 58,820 | 45.1 |
| Republican | Megan Degenfelder | 38,739 | 29.7 |
| Republican | Brent Bien | 30,843 | 23.6 |
| Republican | Curt Blake | 2,161 | 1.7 |
| Total votes | | 130,563 | 100.0 |

== Democratic primary ==
=== Candidates ===
==== Nominee ====
- Kenneth Casner, candidate for governor in 2002 and 2018

=== Results ===
Democratic primary results
| Party | Candidate | Votes | % |
|---|---|---|---|
| Democratic | Kenneth Casner | 10,706 | 100.0 |
| Total votes | | 10,706 | 100.0 |

== Independents and third parties ==
=== Candidates ===
==== Declared ====
- Rebecca Bextel, business owner (Constitution Party)

==== Withdrawn ====
- Joseph Kibler, web designer (Independent; previously ran as Republican)

== General election ==
=== Predictions ===
| Source | Ranking | As of |
|---|---|---|
| The Cook Political Report | Solid R | October 29, 2026 |
| Decision Desk HQ | Safe R | November 3, 2026 |
| Fox News | Solid R | November 1, 2026 |
| Inside Elections | Solid R | October 29, 2026 |
| NBC News | Solid R | November 3, 2026 |
| RealClearPolitics | Solid R | November 1, 2026 |
| Sabato's Crystal Ball | Safe R | November 2, 2026 |
| Silver Bulletin | Solid R | November 3, 2026 |

=== Post-primary endorsements ===
Eric Barlow (R)

Statewide officials

- Mark Gordon, governor of Wyoming (2019–present)

=== Results ===
2026 Wyoming gubernatorial election
| Party | Candidate | Votes | % |
|---|---|---|---|
| Republican | Eric Barlow | 128,496 | 68.12 |
| Constitution | Rebecca Bextel | 31,444 | 16.67 |
| Democratic | Kenneth Casner | 27,472 | 14.56 |
| Write-in | | 1,212 | 0.64 |
| Total votes | | 188,624 | 100.00 |
| Republican hold | | | |

== See also ==
- 2026 United States gubernatorial elections

== Notes ==
Partisan clients
