= Mary Throne =

American politician (born 1960)

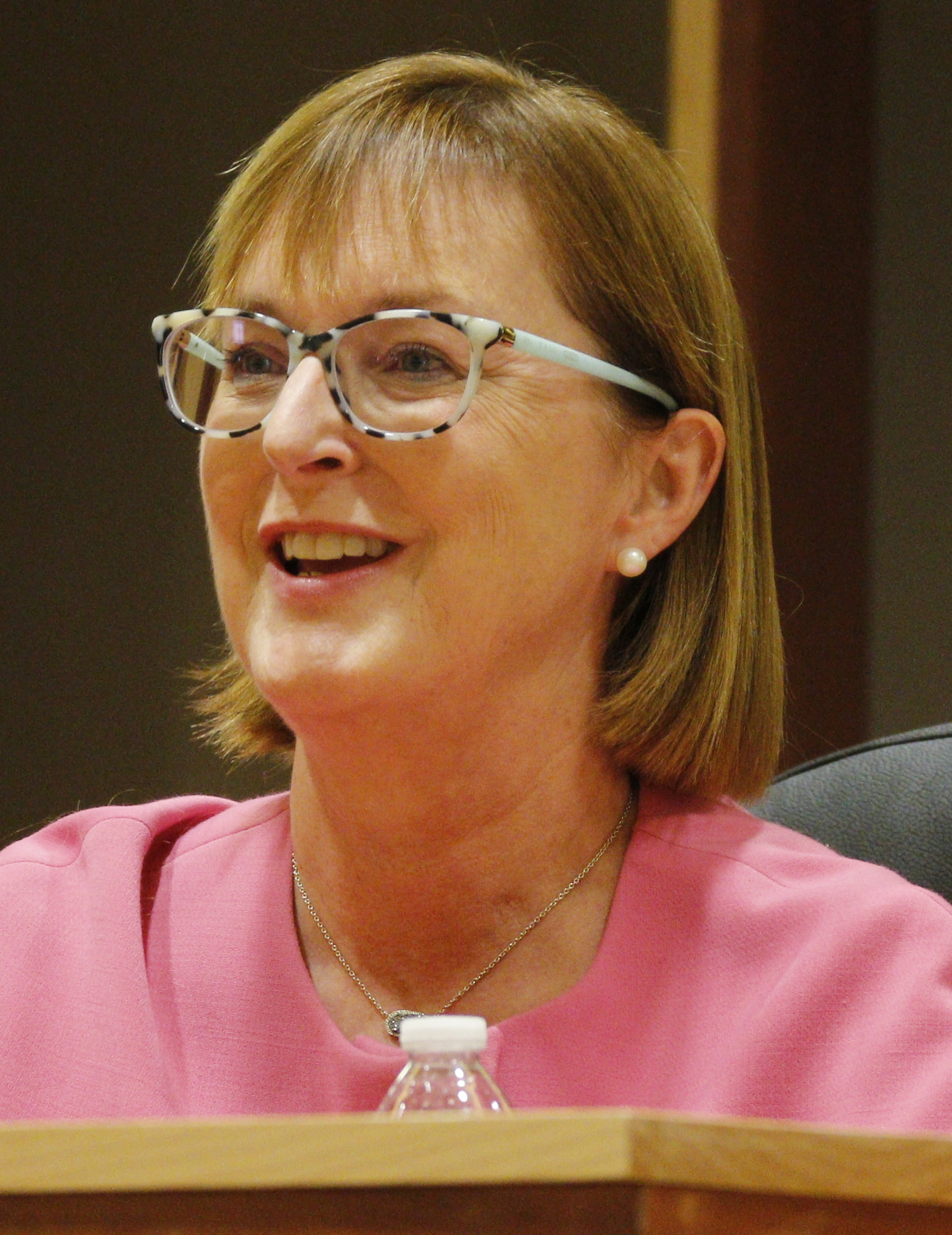

Minority Leader of the Wyoming House of Representatives
- In office January 7, 2013 – January 10, 2017
- Preceded by: Patrick Goggles
- Succeeded by: Cathy Connolly

Member of the Wyoming House of Representatives from the 11th district
- In office January 9, 2007 – January 10, 2017
- Preceded by: Wayne Reese
- Succeeded by: Jared Olsen

Personal details
- Born: 1960 (age 65–66) Gillette, Wyoming, U.S.
- Party: Democratic
- Spouse: Kevin Boyce
- Education: Princeton University (AB); Columbia University (JD)

Mary Ann Throne (born c. 1960) is a Democratic former member of the Wyoming House of Representatives, representing the 11th district from 2007 until 2017. In August 2017, Throne announced her candidacy for Governor of Wyoming in the 2018 election. She easily won the Democratic primary on August 21, 2018. On November 6, 2018, she was defeated in the general election by Republican State Treasurer Mark Gordon in a landslide.

== Biography ==
Throne was born and raised in Campbell County, Wyoming on a ranch on Wild Horse Creek. She graduated with an A.B. in history from Princeton University in 1982 after completing a senior thesis titled "Wyoming Water Laws, 1888-1910: Public Ownership of Water for Irrigation Use." She then received a Juris Doctor degree from Columbia Law School. After college she spent two years volunteering in Thailand, and then moved back to Wyoming to work as an Assistant Wyoming Attorney General in the state, serving in that role from 1992 to 1999.

Throne was elected to the Wyoming House of Representatives in 2006 and was defeated for reelection by Jared Olsen in 2016. She ran for Governor of Wyoming in the 2018 election, but was defeated by then-State Treasurer Mark Gordon. In 2019, Gordon named Throne to a vacancy on the Wyoming Public Service Commission.

Wyoming House of Representatives
Preceded by Patrick Goggles	Minority Leader of the Wyoming House of Representatives; 2013–2017	Succeeded by Cathy Connolly
Party political offices
Preceded by Pete Gosar	Democratic nominee for Governor of Wyoming; 2018	Succeeded by Terry Livingston
