= Abby Angelos =

American politician

Member of the Wyoming House of Representatives from the 3rd district
- Incumbent
- Assumed office January 10, 2023
- Preceded by: Eric Barlow
- Succeeded by: Earl Collier (elect)

Personal details
- Party: Republican
- Profession: Ministry director

Abby Angelos is an American politician and a Republican member of the Wyoming House of Representatives representing the 3rd district since January 10, 2023.

== Political career ==
After the incumbent Republican representative and Speaker of the House Eric Barlow retired to run for the state senate, Angelos declared her candidacy. She ran in the Republican primary on August 16, 2022, and defeated Rusty Bell with 61% of the vote. She then won the general election on November 8, 2022, unopposed.
