= 2021 in Wyoming =

- Decades: 2000s; 2010s; 2020s
- See also: History of Wyoming; Historical outline of Wyoming; List of years in Wyoming; 2021 in the United States

The following is a list of events of the year 2021 in Wyoming.

== Incumbents ==
=== State government ===
- Governor: Mark Gordon (R)

== Events ==
- January 16 – Wyoming reports their first case of the UK variant of SARS-CoV-2 in a man from Teton County with no known travel history.
- September 19 – Killing of Gabby Petito: Petito's remains were found in the Bridger–Teton National Forest.
- October: A number of radio stations cease operations, including KTYN, KRBR and KWRR.

== See also ==
- 2021 in the United States
