= 2024 United States House of Representatives election in Wyoming =

2024 United States House of Representatives election in Wyoming’s at-large district
- November 5, 2024
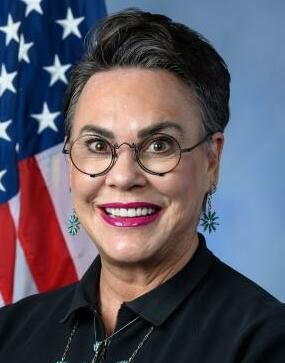

Nominee	Harriet Hageman	Kyle Cameron
Party	Republican	Democratic
Popular vote	184,680	60,778
Percentage	70.61%	23.24%
- Hageman: 40–50% 50–60% 60–70% 70–80% 80–90% >90% Cameron: 40–50% 50–60% 60–70% 70–80% Tie: 50% No data
U.S. Representative before election
Harriet Hageman
Republican
Elected U.S. Representative
Harriet Hageman
Republican

The 2024 United States House of Representatives election in Wyoming was held on November 5, 2024, to elect the U.S. representative for Wyoming's at-large congressional district. The election coincided with other elections to the House of Representatives, elections to the United States Senate, and various state and local elections. The primary elections took place on August 20, 2024.

== Republican primary ==
=== Candidates ===
==== Nominee ====
- Harriet Hageman, incumbent U.S. representative

==== Eliminated in primary ====
- Steven Helling, attorney and Democratic candidate for U.S. House in 2022

=== Endorsements ===
Harriet Hageman

Organizations

- AIPAC

=== Results ===
Results by county: Hageman: 50–60%; 70–80%; 80–90%; >90%

Republican primary results
Party	Candidate	Votes	%
Republican	Harriet Hageman (incumbent)	82,783	80.7
Republican	Steven Helling	19,743	19.3
Total votes		102,526	100.0

== Democratic primary ==
=== Candidates ===
==== Nominee ====
- Kyle Cameron, program manager at the Wyoming Department of Health

=== Results ===
Democratic primary results
Party	Candidate	Votes	%
Democratic	Kyle Cameron	10,047	100.0
Total votes		10,047	100.0

== General election ==
=== Predictions ===
Source	Ranking	As of
The Cook Political Report	Solid R	May 24, 2024
Inside Elections	Solid R	May 9, 2024
Sabato's Crystal Ball	Safe R	May 3, 2024
Elections Daily	Solid R	March 22, 2024
CNalysis	Safe R	March 27, 2024

=== Debate ===
2024 United States House of Representatives election in Wyoming debate
No.	Date	Host	Moderator	Link	Republican	Democratic	Libertarian	Constitution
Key: P Participant A Absent N Not invited I Invited W Withdrawn								
Key: P Participant A Absent N Not invited I Invited W Withdrawn					Harriet Hageman	Kyle Cameron	Richard Brubaker	Jeffrey Haggit
1	Oct. 17, 2024	Central Wyoming College; Wyoming PBS	Steve Peck	YouTube	A	P	P	P

=== Results ===
2024 Wyoming's at-large congressional district election
Party	Candidate	Votes	%	±%
Republican	Harriet Hageman (incumbent)	184,680	70.61%	+2.43
Democratic	Kyle Cameron	60,778	23.24%	−1.13
Libertarian	Richard Brubaker	9,223	3.53%	+0.73
Constitution	Jeffrey Haggit	5,362	2.05%	−0.27
Write-in		1,505	0.58%	–1.75
Total votes		261,548	100.00%	N/A
Republican hold				

==== By county ====
County	Harriet Hageman Republican		Kyle Cameron Democratic		Various candidates Other parties		Margin		Total votes cast
County	#	%	#	%	#	%	#	%	Total votes cast
Albany	8,559	49.35%	7,674	44.25%	1,109	6.39%	885	5.10%	17,342
Big Horn	4,644	82.49%	647	11.49%	339	6.02%	3,997	70.99%	5,630
Campbell	15,058	85.28%	1,700	9.63%	900	5.10%	13,358	75.65%	17,658
Carbon	4,703	75.85%	1,088	17.55%	409	6.60%	3,615	58.31%	6,200
Converse	5,436	82.90%	691	10.54%	430	6.56%	4,745	72.37%	6,557
Crook	3,689	86.98%	357	8.42%	195	4.60%	3,332	78.57%	4,241
Fremont	11,258	67.56%	4,369	26.22%	1,037	6.22%	6,889	41.34%	16,664
Goshen	4,876	80.13%	938	15.41%	271	4.45%	3,938	64.72%	6,085
Hot Springs	2,022	78.95%	400	15.62%	139	5.43%	1,622	63.33%	2,561
Johnson	3,835	80.10%	714	14.91%	239	4.99%	3,121	65.18%	4,788
Laramie	27,090	63.14%	12,893	30.05%	2,924	6.81%	14,197	33.09%	42,907
Lincoln	8,712	82.20%	1,365	12.88%	522	4.92%	7,347	69.32%	10,599
Natrona	23,396	71.66%	7,090	21.72%	2,164	6.63%	16,306	49.94%	32,650
Niobrara	1,080	89.18%	79	6.52%	52	4.29%	1,001	82.66%	1,211
Park	12,620	78.03%	2,677	16.55%	877	5.42%	9,943	61.48%	16,174
Platte	3,783	80.66%	682	14.54%	225	4.80%	3,101	66.12%	4,690
Sheridan	11,647	73.00%	3,380	21.18%	928	5.82%	8,267	51.81%	15,955
Sublette	3,770	78.56%	748	15.59%	281	5.86%	3,022	62.97%	4,799
Sweetwater	11,588	72.08%	3,196	19.88%	1,292	8.04%	8,392	52.20%	16,076
Teton	4,148	32.42%	7,919	61.90%	727	5.68%	-3,771	-29.47%	12,794
Uinta	6,811	77.76%	1,314	15.00%	634	7.24%	5,497	62.76%	8,759
Washakie	3,047	80.12%	548	14.41%	208	5.47%	2,499	65.71%	3,803
Weston	2,908	85.40%	309	9.07%	188	5.52%	2,599	76.33%	3,405
Totals	184,680	70.61%	60,778	23.24%	16,090	6.15%	123,902	47.37%	261,548

==== Counties that flipped from Democratic to Republican ====
- Albany (largest municipality: Laramie)
