= 2022 Wyoming elections =

- November 8, 2022

The 2022 Wyoming elections took place on November 8, 2022. The statewide direct primary election was held on August 16, 2022. Wyoming voters elected Wyoming's seat to the United States House of Representatives, all of the seats of the Wyoming House of Representatives, all even-numbered seats of the Wyoming Senate, governor of Wyoming, and various statewide offices.

== United States Congress ==
=== House of Representatives ===
Incumbent Liz Cheney was criticized by former president Donald Trump and his supporters mainly for her vote to impeach him, as well as refusing to object to the certification of the electoral college results in the 2020 presidential election. Shortly after her impeachment vote, Trump and allies stated that they would work together to back and endorse a primary challenger to Cheney before the 2022 election.

== Statewide constitutional offices ==
=== Governor ===
Incumbent Republican governor Mark Gordon ran for re-election, and won.

=== Secretary of state ===
Incumbent Republican Wyoming Secretary of State Edward Buchanan initially run for re-election, but later chose not to seek a second term.

=== Treasurer ===
Results by county Buchanan: 90–100%

Incumbent Republican Curt Meier won re-election.

=== Auditor ===
Results by county Racines: 90–100%

Incumbent Republican Wyoming State Auditor Kristi Racines won re-election without opposition.

=== Superintendent of Public Instruction ===
2022 Wyoming Superintendent of Public Instruction election
- November 8, 2022
Nominee	Megan Degenfelder	Sergio Maldonado
Party	Republican	Democratic
Popular vote	142,544	43,260
Percentage	75.04%	22.77%
- Degenfelder: 50–60% 70–80% 80–90% Maldonado: 60–70%
Superintendent of Public Instruction before election
Brian Schroeder
Republican
Elected Superintendent of Public Instruction
Megan Degenfelder
Republican

Megan Degenfelder defeated appointee Brian Schroeder in the Republican primary. Schroeder had been appointed following the resignation of incumbent Jillian Balow, who resigned to become the Virginia Superintendent of Public Instruction after being appointed by Virginia governor Glenn Youngkin. Degenfelder won the general election against Democrat Sergio Maldanodo.

==== Republican primary ====
===== Candidates =====
- Megan Degenfelder, former Chief Policy Officer under superintendent Jillian Balow
- Thomas Kelly (withdrawn), chair of the political and military science department at the American Military University
- Brian Schroeder, incumbent Superintendent of Public Instruction
- Robert J. White III, trona miner
- Jennifer Zerba, cosmetologist

===== Candidate forum =====
2022 Wyoming Superintendent of Public Instruction Republican primary candidate forum
No.	Date	Host	Moderator	Link	Republican	Republican	Republican	Republican	Republican
Key: P Participant A Absent N Not invited I Invited W Withdrawn									
Key: P Participant A Absent N Not invited I Invited W Withdrawn					Brian Schroeder	Megan Degenfelder	Thomas Kelly	Robert J. White III	Jennifer Zerba
1	June 23, 2022	Boys & Girls Club of Central Wyoming	Craig Blumenshine; Steve Peck	YouTube	P	P	P	N	P

===== Results =====
2022 Wyoming Superintendent of Public Instruction Republican primary election
Party	Candidate	Votes	%
Republican	Megan Degenfelder	59,334	40.58%
Republican	Brian Schroeder	55,769	38.14%
Republican	Jennifer Zerba	13,662	9.34%
Republican	Thomas Kelly (withdrawn)	12,347	8.44%
Republican	Robert J. White III	4,396	3.01%
Write-in		721	0.49%
Total votes		146,229	100%

==== Results ====
2022 Wyoming Superintendent of Public Instruction election
Party	Candidate	Votes	%
Republican	Megan Degenfelder	142,544	75.04
Democratic	Sergio Maldonado	43,260	22.77
Write-in		4,156	2.19
Total votes		189,960	100.00
Republican hold			

== State legislature ==
=== Wyoming Senate ===
Of the 30 seats in the Wyoming Senate, 15 were up for election in 2022.

=== Wyoming House of Representatives ===
All 60 seats in the Wyoming House of Representatives were up for election in 2022, plus two additional seats added in redistricting.
