= Earl Collier =

American politician

Member of the Wyoming House of Representatives from the 3rd district
- member-elect
- Assumed office January 4, 2027
- Preceded by: Abby Angelos

Personal details
- Party: Republican
- Website: Campaign website

Earl Collier is an American politician. He earned a bachelor's degree in geography from the University of Wyoming. A member of the Republican Party, he is the member-elect of the Wyoming House of Representatives for the 3rd district. He was elected at the 2026 election. He is a land surveyor.
