= Jim Eliopulos =

American gridiron football player (born 1959)

No. 57, 52
- Position: Linebacker

Personal information
- Born: April 18, 1959 (age 67); Dearborn, Michigan, U.S.
- Listed height: 6 ft 2 in (1.88 m)
- Listed weight: 229 lb (104 kg)

Career information
- High school: Cheyenne Central (WY)
- College: Wyoming
- NFL draft: 1982: 3rd round, 81st overall pick

Career history
- Dallas Cowboys (1982)*; St. Louis Cardinals (1983); New York Jets (1983-1985); Toronto Argonauts (1987)
- * Offseason or practice squad member only

Awards and highlights
- All-WAC (1981)

Career NFL statistics
- Fumble recoveries: 1
- Stats at Pro Football Reference

James A. Eliopulos (born April 18, 1959) is an American former professional football player who was a linebacker in the National Football League (NFL) for the Dallas Cowboys, St. Louis Cardinals and New York Jets. He played college football at the University of Wyoming.

== Early life ==
Eliopulos attended Cheyenne Central High School, where he lettered in football, basketball, baseball and track. He was named Wyoming's high school athlete of the year as a senior.

He enrolled at Westminster College, before transferring to the University of Wyoming after his sophomore season.

As a junior, he started at linebacker after having played different positions (including tight end) in previous years, finishing with 83 tackles, 2 interceptions, 2 forced fumbles and 4 sacks.

In 1981, he posted 84 tackles (led the team), 2 interceptions, 3 fumble recoveries and a then school record 10 sacks. His best game was against Colorado State University when he made 10 tackles, 6 sacks for 54 yards in losses and one interception, earning him WAC player of the week honors.

== Professional career ==
=== Dallas Cowboys ===
Eliopulos was selected in the third round (81st overall) of the 1982 NFL draft by the Dallas Cowboys, who liked his potential as an athlete. He injured his knee during the first week of training camp and was placed on the injured reserve list on September 6. He was released on August 22, 1983.

=== St. Louis Cardinals ===
On August 25, 1983, he was claimed off waivers by the St. Louis Cardinals, but was released after playing in 4 games.

=== New York Jets ===
In 1983, he signed with the New York Jets as a free agent. He spent 3 seasons as a backup, playing mainly on special teams. In 1985, he was cut on 3 occasions.

=== Toronto Argonauts (CFL) ===
In 1987, he was signed by the Toronto Argonauts of the Canadian Football League. He was released on June 3.
