= 2026 Wyoming local elections =

- November 3, 2026
- Mayoral elections

59 mayors (8 city, 51 town)
- Cities with mayoral elections
- Council elections

196 councilors (59 city, 137 town)
- Cities with council elections

Local elections are scheduled to be held throughout Wyoming's towns, cities, and counties on November 3, 2026, with nonpartisan primaries taking place on August 4. As of 2022, there are 99 municipalities throughout the state, of which 19 are cities. By default under Wyoming law, each town and city has one mayor and four councilors, all elected. As 2026 is a midterm election, sheriff elections will be held in every county. These elections will be held concurrently with other elections in the state.

== Mayoral elections ==
Eight of the nineteen cities in Wyoming are scheduled to hold mayoral elections in 2026.

- Buffalo: The incumbent mayor is Shane J. Schrader, serving since 2019.
- Evanston: The incumbent mayor is Kent Williams, serving since 2019.
- Gillette: The incumbent mayor is Shay Lundvall, serving since 2023.
- Green River: The incumbent mayor is Pete Rust, serving since 2015.
- Lander: The incumbent mayor is Monte Richardson, serving since 2019.
- Riverton: The incumbent mayor is Tim Hancock, serving since 2023.
- Rock Springs: The incumbent mayor is Max Mickelson, serving since 2023.
- Torrington: The incumbent mayor is Herb Doby, serving since 2023.

== Council elections ==
All nineteen cities in Wyoming are scheduled to hold city council elections in 2026.

- Buffalo: 2 of 4 seats.
- Casper: 4 of 9 seats.
- Cheyenne: 3 of 9 seats.
- Cody: 3 of 6 seats.
- Douglas: 1 of 4 seats.
- Evanston: 3 of 6 seats.
- Gillette: 3 of 6 seats.
- Green River: 3 of 6 seats.
- Kemmerer: 3 of 6 seats.
- Lander: 3 of 6 seats.
- Laramie: 4 of 9 seats.
- Newcastle: 3 of 6 seats.
- Powell: 3 of 6 seats.
- Rawlins: 4 of 7 seats.
- Riverton: 3 of 6 seats.
- Rock Springs: 4 of 8 seats.
- Sheridan: 3 of 6 seats.
- Torrington: 2 of 4 seats.
- Worland: 5 of 9 seats.
