= Deborah Alden =

American politician

Member of the Wyoming House of Representatives from the 3rd district
- In office 2003–2008
- Preceded by: Bill Stafford
- Succeeded by: Frank Peasley

Deborah Alden is an American Republican politician from Wheatland, Wyoming. She represented the 3rd district in the Wyoming House of Representatives from 2003 to 2008.
