= 2022 in Wyoming =

- Decades: 2000s; 2010s; 2020s
- See also: History of Wyoming; Historical outline of Wyoming; List of years in Wyoming; 2022 in the United States

The following is a list of events of the year 2022 in Wyoming.

== Incumbents ==
=== State government ===
- Governor: Mark Gordon (R)

== Events ==
- August 22 – Wyoming reports its first case of Monkeypox in a person from Laramie County, with the state being the 50th U/S state to report a case of the disease.
- November 8 –
  - 2022 Wyoming House of Representatives election
  - 2022 Wyoming gubernatorial election
  - 2022 United States House of Representatives election in Wyoming

== See also ==
- 2022 in the United States
