= Russ Donley =

American politician

Member of the Wyoming House of Representatives
- In office 1969–1984

Speaker of the Wyoming House of Representatives
- In office 1983–1984
- Preceded by: Bob Burnett
- Succeeded by: Jack Sidi

Personal details
- Born: February 3, 1939 (age 87) Salt Lake City, Utah, U.S.
- Party: Republican
- Spouse: Karen Kocherhans (m. 1960)
- Children: 3
- Education: University of Wyoming; University of Florida

Russ Donley (born February 3, 1939) is an American politician. He served as a Republican member of the Wyoming House of Representatives.

== Life and career ==
Donley was born in Salt Lake City, Utah. He attended the University of Wyoming and the University of Florida.

Donley was an engineer.

Donley served in the Wyoming House of Representatives from 1969 to 1984.
