= Wyoming's 3rd House of Representatives district =

American legislative district

Wyoming's 3rd State House of Representatives district
- Wyoming's 3rd House of Representatives district as of 2022
Representative
Abby Angelos; R–Gillette
- Demographics: 88% White; 1% Black; 7% Hispanic; 4% Multiracial
- Population (2022): 8,530

Wyoming's 3rd House of Representatives district is one of 62 districts in the Wyoming House of Representatives. The district encompasses part of Campbell County. It is represented by Republican Representative Abby Angelos of Gillette.

In 1992, the state of Wyoming switched from electing state legislators by county to a district-based system.

== List of members representing the district ==
Representative	Party	Term	Note
Bill Stafford	Republican	1993 – 2003	Elected in 1992. Re-elected in 1994. Re-elected in 1996. Re-elected in 1998. Re-elected in 2000.
Deborah Alden	Republican	2003 – 2009	Elected in 2002. Re-elected in 2004. Re-elected in 2006.
Frank Peasley	Republican	2009 – 2013	Elected in 2008. Re-elected in 2010.
Eric Barlow	Republican	2013 – 2023	Elected in 2012. Re-elected in 2014. Re-elected in 2016. Re-elected in 2018. Re-elected in 2020.
Abby Angelos	Republican	2023 – present	Elected in 2022. Re-elected in 2024.
Earl Collier	Republican	2027 – member-elect	Elected in 2026.

== Recent election results ==
=== 2014 ===
House district 3 general election
Party	Candidate	Votes	%
Republican	Eric Barlow (Incumbent)	2,222	98.27%
Write-ins		39	1.72%
Total votes		2,261	100.0%
Invalid or blank votes		488	
Republican hold			

=== 2016 ===
House district 3 general election
Party	Candidate	Votes	%
Republican	Eric Barlow (Incumbent)	3,822	98.45%
Write-ins		60	1.54%
Total votes		3,882	100.0%
Invalid or blank votes		539	
Republican hold			

=== 2018 ===
House district 3 general election
Party	Candidate	Votes	%
Republican	Eric Barlow (Incumbent)	2,811	99.18%
Write-ins		23	0.81%
Total votes		2,834	100.0%
Invalid or blank votes		365	
Republican hold			

=== 2020 ===
House district 3 general election
Party	Candidate	Votes	%
Republican	Eric Barlow (Incumbent)	4,016	97.68%
Write-ins		95	2.31%
Total votes		4,111	100.0%
Invalid or blank votes		505	
Republican hold			

=== 2022 ===
House district 3 general election
Party	Candidate	Votes	%
Republican	Abby Angelos	2,619	96.49%
Write-ins		95	3.50%
Total votes		2,714	100.0%
Invalid or blank votes		262	
Republican hold			

=== 2024 ===
House district 3 general election
Party	Candidate	Votes	%
Republican	Abby Angelos (Incumbent)	3,753	99.04%
Write-ins		36	0.95%
Total votes		3,789	100.0%
Invalid or blank votes		418	
Republican hold			

== Historical district boundaries ==
Map	Description	Apportionment Plan	Notes
	Goshen County (part); Platte County (part)	1992 Apportionment Plan	
	Converse County (part); Platte County (part)	2002 Apportionment Plan	
	Campbell County (part); Converse County (part)	2012 Apportionment Plan	
