= Eric Barlow =

Governor-elect of Wyoming (born 1966)

- Barlow in 2026

Governor-elect of Wyoming
- Assuming office January 4, 2027
- Succeeding: Mark Gordon

Member of the Wyoming Senate from the 23rd district
- Incumbent
- Assumed office January 10, 2023
- Preceded by: Jeff Wasserburger

65th Speaker of the Wyoming House of Representatives
- In office January 12, 2021 – January 10, 2023
- Preceded by: Steve Harshman
- Succeeded by: Albert Sommers

Majority Leader of the Wyoming House of Representatives
- In office January 8, 2019 – January 12, 2021
- Preceded by: David Miller
- Succeeded by: Albert Sommers

Member of the Wyoming House of Representatives from the 3rd district
- In office January 8, 2013 – January 10, 2023
- Preceded by: Frank Peasley
- Succeeded by: Abby Angelos

Personal details
- Born: May 8, 1966 (age 60) Gillette, Wyoming, U.S.
- Party: Republican
- Spouse: Kelly Barlow
- Children: 2
- Education: Colorado State University, Fort Collins (DVM)
- Website: State Senate website; Campaign website

Eric Barlow (born May 8, 1966) is an American veterinarian and politician who is the governor-elect of Wyoming. He was a Republican member of the Wyoming Senate since 2023, and before that he was the speaker of the Wyoming House of Representatives from 2021 to 2023, and a member of the chamber representing District 3 from 2013 to 2023.

Barlow won the 2026 Wyoming gubernatorial election to succeed Mark Gordon.

== Education ==
Barlow earned his DVM from Colorado State University.

== Elections ==
- 2012: When Republican Representative Frank Peasley retired and left the District 3 seat open, Barlow won the August 21, 2012 Republican Primary and defeated Douglas Gerard with 802 votes (49.8%), and was unopposed for the November 6, 2012 General election, winning with 3,670 votes.
- 2014: Barlow again defeated Douglas Gerard in the August 19, 2014 Republican Primary with 959 votes (53.0%), and was unopposed in the November 4, 2014 General Election, winning with 2,222 votes.
- 2016: Barlow defeated Frank Eathorne in the August 16, 2016 Republican Primary, winning with 1,207 votes (60.23%). Barlow was then unopposed in the November 8, 2016 General Election, winning with 3,822 votes.
- 2018: Barlow was unopposed in both the August 21, 2018 Republican Primary and the November 6, 2018 General Election, winning with 1,746 and 2,811 votes respectively.
- 2020: Barlow won the August 18, 2020 Republican Primary against Martin E. Phillips with 1,545 votes (70.3%), and was unopposed for the November 3, 2020 General Election, winning with 4,016 votes.
- 2026: Barlow won the August 18, 2026 Republican Primary against Megan Degenfelder with 58,825 votes (45.0%). Barlow then went on to win the November 3, 2026 General Election against Constitution Party nominee Rebecca Bextel and Democratic Party nominee Kenneth Casner, winning with 128,496 votes (68.1%).

Wyoming House of Representatives
Preceded by David Miller	Majority Leader of the Wyoming House of Representatives; 2019–2021	Succeeded by Albert Sommers
Preceded by Steve Harshman	Speaker of the Wyoming House of Representatives; 2021–2023	Succeeded by Albert Sommers
Party political offices
Preceded by Mark Gordon	Republican nominee for Governor of Wyoming; 2026	Most recent
Political offices
Preceded by Mark Gordon	Governor of Wyoming; Taking office 2027	Elect
