= Wyoming's 11th House of Representatives district =

American legislative district

Wyoming's 11th State House of Representatives district
- Wyoming's 11th House of Representatives district as of 2022
Representative
Jacob Wasserburger; R–Cheyenne
- Demographics: 82% White; 2% Black; 10% Hispanic; 1% Asian; 1% Native American; 4% Multiracial
- Population (2022): 9,293

Wyoming's 11th House of Representatives district is one of 62 districts in the Wyoming House of Representatives. The district encompasses part of Laramie County. It is represented by Republican Representative Jacob Wasserburger of Cheyenne.

In 1992, the state of Wyoming switched from electing state legislators by county to a district-based system.

== List of members representing the district ==
Representative	Party	Term	Note
Don Sullivan	Democratic	1993 – 1995	Elected in 1992.
Pam Taylor-Horton	Democratic	1995 – 1997	Elected in 1994.
Wayne Reese	Democratic	1997 – 2007	Elected in 1996. Re-elected in 1998. Re-elected in 2000. Re-elected in 2002. Re-elected in 2004.
Mary Throne	Democratic	2007 – 2017	Elected in 2006. Re-elected in 2008. Re-elected in 2010. Re-elected in 2012. Re-elected in 2014.
Jared Olsen	Republican	2017 – 2025	Elected in 2016. Re-elected in 2018. Re-elected in 2020. Re-elected in 2022.
Jacob Wasserburger	Republican	2025 – present	Elected in 2024.

== Recent election results ==
=== 2014 ===
House district 11 general election
Party	Candidate	Votes	%
Democratic	Mary Throne (Incumbent)	1,093	55.76%
Republican	Phil Regeski	863	44.03%
Write-ins		4	0.20%
Total votes		1,960	100.0%
Invalid or blank votes		76	
Democratic hold			

=== 2016 ===
House district 11 general election
Party	Candidate	Votes	%
Republican	Jared Olsen	1,549	50.93%
Democratic	Mary Throne (Incumbent)	1,487	48.89%
Write-ins		5	0.16%
Total votes		3,041	100.0%
Invalid or blank votes		156	
Republican gain from Democratic			

=== 2018 ===
House district 11 general election
Party	Candidate	Votes	%
Republican	Jared Olsen (Incumbent)	1,275	53.61%
Democratic	Calob Taylor	1,098	46.17%
Write-ins		5	0.21%
Total votes		2,378	100.0%
Invalid or blank votes		73	
Republican hold			

=== 2020 ===
House district 11 general election
Party	Candidate	Votes	%
Republican	Jared Olsen (Incumbent)	1,807	54.95%
Democratic	Amy Spieker	1,470	44.70%
Write-ins		11	0.33%
Total votes		3,288	100.0%
Invalid or blank votes		59	
Republican hold			

=== 2022 ===
House district 11 general election
Party	Candidate	Votes	%
Republican	Jared Olsen (Incumbent)	1,145	52.64%
Democratic	Marguerite Herman	1,013	46.57%
Write-ins		17	0.78%
Total votes		2,175	100.0%
Invalid or blank votes		38	
Republican hold			

=== 2024 ===
House district 11 general election
Party	Candidate	Votes	%
Republican	Jacob Wasserburger	1,774	54.26%
Democratic	Sara Burlingame	1,482	45.33%
Write-ins		13	0.39%
Total votes		3,269	100.0%
Invalid or blank votes		76	
Republican hold			

== Historical district boundaries ==
Map	Description	Apportionment Plan	Notes
	Laramie County (part)	1992 Apportionment Plan	
	Laramie County (part)	2002 Apportionment Plan	
	Laramie County (part)	2012 Apportionment Plan	
