= Sara Burlingame =

American politician

Member of the Wyoming House of Representatives from the 44th district
- In office January 7, 2019 – January 4, 2021
- Preceded by: James W. Byrd
- Succeeded by: John Romero-Martinez

Personal details
- Born: c. 1976
- Party: Democratic
- Spouse: Jason Thomas

Sara Burlingame (born c. 1976) is an American politician and former Wyoming state legislator. A member of the Democratic Party, Burlingame represented the 44th district in the Wyoming House of Representatives from 2019 to 2021.

== Career ==
On November 6, 2018, Burlingame was elected to the Wyoming House of Representatives where she represents the 44th district. She won with 51.6% of the vote. She was sworn in on January 7, 2019. Burlingame is a Democrat. On August 12, 2019, Burlingame expressed an interest in stricter gun control legislation in the United States. Burlingame is the executive director of Wyoming Equality.

She was defeated in the 2020 election by Republican John Romero-Martinez. She was a candidate in the 2024 Wyoming House of Representatives election but was defeated by Jacob Wasserburger.

== Personal life ==
Burlingame's home town is Cheyenne, Wyoming. Burlingame is married to Jason Thomas. Burlingame is Unitarian Universalist.
