= 1890 in Wyoming =

- Decades: 1890s; 1900s; 1910s
- See also: History of Wyoming; Historical outline of Wyoming; List of years in Wyoming; 1890 in the United States

The following is a list of events of the year 1890 in Wyoming.

== Incumbents ==
=== State government ===
- Governor: Francis E. Warren (R) (October 11-November 24), Amos W. Barber (R) (starting November 24)

== Events ==
- July 10 – The Wyoming Territory is admitted to the union of the United States as the 44th U.S state.
- October 11 – Francis E. Warren is elected as the first governor of the state of Wyoming.
- Fort Bridger closes.

== See also ==
- 1890 in the United States
