= Jared Olsen =

American politician

Member of the Wyoming Senate from the 8th district
- Incumbent
- Assumed office January 6, 2025
- Preceded by: Affie Ellis

Member of the Wyoming House of Representatives from the 11th district
- In office January 10, 2017 – January 6, 2025
- Preceded by: Mary Throne
- Succeeded by: Jacob Wasserburger

Personal details
- Born: October 10, 1987 (age 39) Evanston, Wyoming, U.S.
- Party: Republican
- Spouse: Dani Olsen
- Children: 3
- Education: Weber State University; University of Wyoming
- Profession: Lawyer
- Website: Olsen for Wyoming House District 11

Jared Olsen (born October 10, 1987) is an American politician. He is a Republican member of the Wyoming Senate. He was previously a member of the Wyoming House of Representatives representing District 11 since January 10, 2017.

== Career ==
Prior to his election to the state legislature, Olsen was chairman of the Laramie County Republican Party. He is also an attorney in Cheyenne. After the 2020 election, Olsen was also elected to be the Majority Whip of the house.

== Elections ==
=== 2016 ===
Olsen challenged incumbent Democratic Representative and House Minority Leader Mary Throne for the seat. He ran unopposed in the Republican primary and defeated Throne in the general election with 51% of the vote.

=== 2018 ===
Olsen ran unopposed in the August 21, 2018 Republican Primary and defeated Calob Taylor, a Democrat, in the November 6, 2018 General Election with 1,275 votes (53.6%).

=== 2020 ===
Olsen ran unopposed in the August 18, 2020 Republican Primary and defeated Amy Spieker, a Democrat, in the November 3, 2020 General Election with 1,807 votes (55.0%).
