= Tamara Trujillo =

American politician

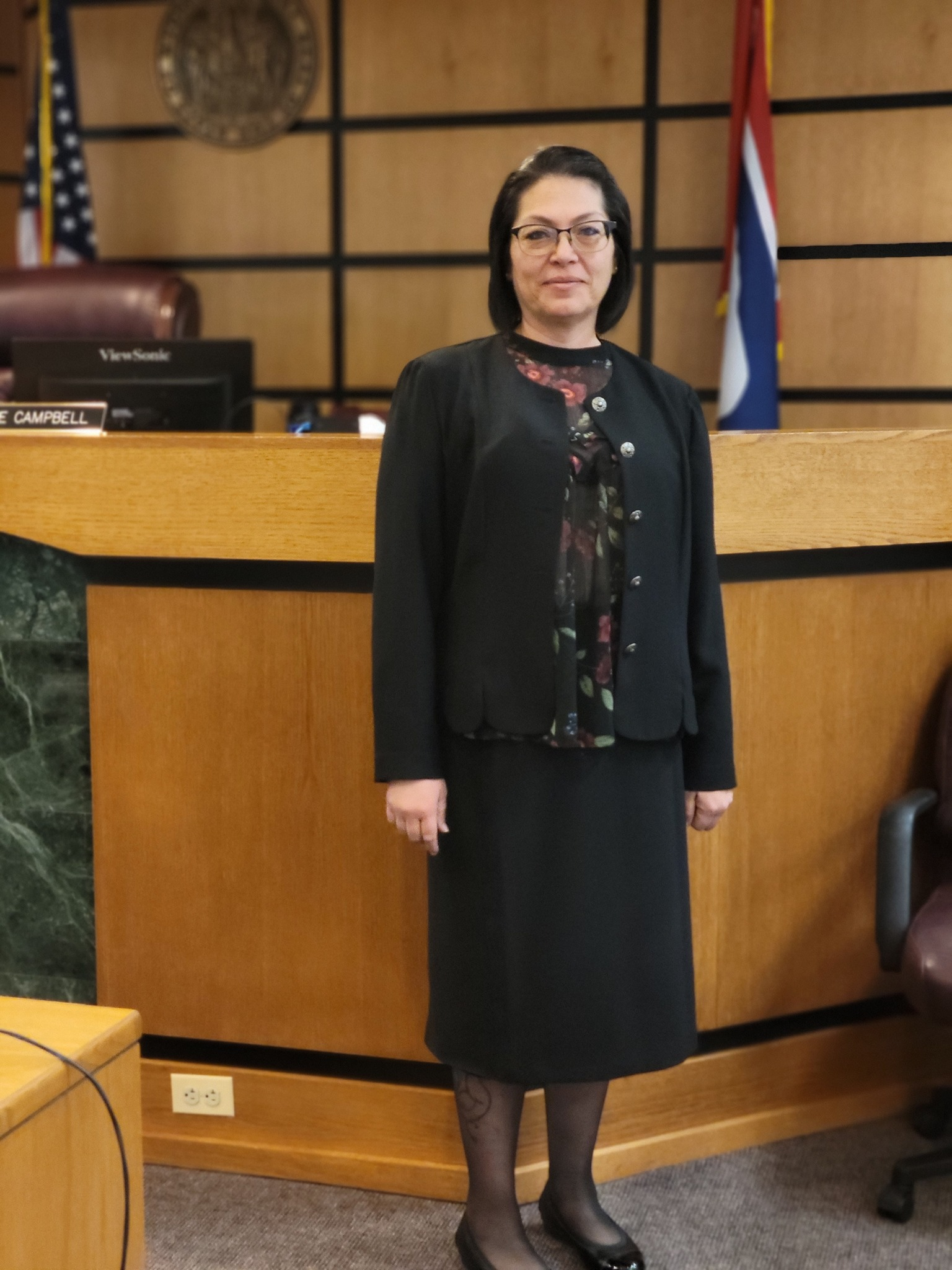

Member of the Wyoming House of Representatives from the 44th district
- In office January 2, 2023 – January 14, 2025
- Preceded by: John Romero-Martinez
- Succeeded by: Lee Filer

Personal details
- Party: Constitution (2026–present)
- Other political affiliations: Republican (until 2026)
- Relations: John Romero-Martinez (cousin)
- Children: 3

Tamara N. Trujillo is a former American politician who served as a member of the Wyoming House of Representatives for the 44th district. Elected in November 2022, she assumed office on January 2, 2023. She lost the 2024 district 44 primary election and was succeeded by Lee Filer.

She is the Constitution Party nominee in the 2026 election for the Wyoming Secretary of State.

== Career ==
Prior to entering politics, Trujillo worked for HF Sinclair and two trucking companies. She was elected to the Wyoming House of Representatives in November 2022, defeating her cousin, John Romero-Martinez. She assumed office on January 2, 2023.
