= Ryan Koltiska =

American politician

Member of the Wyoming House of Representatives from the 30th district
- member-elect
- Assumed office January 4, 2027
- Preceded by: Tom Kelly

Personal details
- Party: Republican
- Website: Campaign website

Ryan Koltiska is an American politician. A member of the Republican Party, he is the member-elect of the Wyoming House of Representatives for the 30th district. He was elected at the 2026 election. Kolitska grew up on a ranch in Sheridan, Wyoming. He is Director of Development at The Hub on Smith.
