= Cheyenne Central High School =

Location
- 5500 Education Drive; Cheyenne, Wyoming 82009; United States; 41.170966°N 104.835759°W

Information
- School type: Public, high school
- Opened: 1904
- School district: Laramie County SD #1
- Superintendent: Margaret Crespo
- CEEB code: 510063
- Principal: Karen Delbridge
- Teaching staff: 91.22 (FTE)
- Grades: 9–12
- Gender: Coed
- Enrollment: 1,284 (2023-2024)
- Average class size: ~20
- Student to teacher ratio: 14.08
- Colors: Cardinal Red and black
- Song: School Song
- Mascot: Indian
- Team name: Indians
- Newspaper: CHS Lariat
- Yearbook: Pow-wow
- Website: central.laramie1.org

Map of Cheyenne, Wyoming

Cheyenne Central High School is a public secondary school (grades 9-12) located in Cheyenne, Wyoming, United States. It serves Laramie County School District #1. The high school serves students who attended McCormick JHS, Clawson ES, Coyote Ridge Elementary School, Davis ES, Deming/Miller ES, Freedom ES, Gilchrist ES, Hobbs ES, Jessup ES, Pioneer Park ES in Cheyenne, and Willadsen ES in Granite. The current principals are Karen Delbridge, Nicholas Lamp.

== History ==
Cheyenne High School, the predecessor of Cheyenne Central High School, was the first high school in Wyoming, founded in 1869. The school is a charter member of the North Central Association of Colleges and Secondary Schools. Cheyenne Central High School was first accredited in 1904 and continues to be accredited by that organization and by the Wyoming Department of Education.

== Academics ==
Cheyenne Central offers 21 Advanced Placement programs. For the 2012-2013 school year, Cheyenne Central made "Adequate Yearly Progress" in accordance with the Federal No Child Left Behind Act.

=== JROTC ===
The program was started in 1903, originally offering the class at Cheyenne High School (now called Cheyenne Central High School). It was initially run as a cooperative effort between the Wyoming National Guard and the Laramie County School Board. Since 1916, the program has been a cooperative effort between the school district and the U.S. Army. This unit is currently, as of October 14, 2022, an Honor Unit with Distinction (top 10% in the nation).

=== Athletics ===
The school offers competitive sports including men's basketball, women's basketball, cheerleading, cross country, dance, football, golf, men's soccer, women's soccer, men's swimming & diving, women's swimming & diving, tennis, track (indoor and outdoor), volleyball, and wrestling.

== Notable alumni ==
- Harriet Elizabeth Byrd (Class of 1944), first African-American member of the Wyoming legislature
- Boyd Dowler (Class of 1955), former NFL player with the Green Bay Packers; 1959 rookie of the year and five NFL titles
- Jim Eliopulos (Class of 1977), former NFL player
- John Godina (Class of 1990), an American shot putter, whose record includes three World Championship wins and two Olympic medals
- Chris LeDoux (Class of 1969), country music singer and rodeoer
- Lawson Lovering (class of 2021), NBA basketball player
- Bryce Meredith (Class of 2013), amateur wrestler: two-time NCAA Division I finalist
- Monte Olsen, ski instructor and member of the Wyoming House of Representatives
- Leslie Osterman (Class of 1966), member of the Kansas House of Representatives and retired health systems analyst from Wichita, Kansas
- Britney Tennant, businesswoman and member of the Wyoming House of Representatives
- Thomas M. Watlington (Class of 1922), US Army major general
- Don Westbrook (Class of 1972), former NFL player
- Alvin Wiederspahn, former member of the Wyoming Senate and Wyoming House of Representatives, husband of Cynthia Lummis
