= 2024 in Wyoming =

- Decades: 2000s; 2010s; 2020s
- See also: History of Wyoming; Historical outline of Wyoming; List of years in Wyoming; 2024 in the United States

The following is a list of events of the year 2024 in Wyoming.

== Incumbents ==
=== State government ===
- Governor: Mark Gordon (R)

== Events ==
- Ongoing: 2024 Wyoming wildfires
- April 13 –
  - 2024 Wyoming Democratic presidential caucuses
  - 2024 Wyoming Republican presidential caucuses
- July 4 – A white supremacist attempts to commit a mass shooting at an employee dining hall in Yellowstone National Park. National Park Rangers, who were already looking for the gunman after he held a woman hostage the previous day, kill the gunman in a shoot-out.
- July 26 – 2024 Gillette Pilatus PC-12 crash: A plane crashes in Campbell County, just north of Gillette, starting a wildfire and killing all seven people on board, including three members of the gospel group The Nelons.
- November 5 – 2024 United States presidential election in Wyoming

== See also ==
- 2024 in the United States
