= Brian Costello (politician) =

American politician

Member of the Wyoming House of Representatives from the 37th district
- member-elect
- Assumed office January 4, 2027
- Preceded by: Steve Harshman

Personal details
- Party: Republican
- Website: Campaign website

Brian Costello is an American politician. A member of the Republican Party, he is the member-elect of the Wyoming House of Representatives for the 37th district. He was elected at the 2026 election, succeeding Steve Harshman. He is a Natrona County High School teacher and coach.
