= 2025 in Wyoming =

- Decades: 2000s; 2010s; 2020s
- See also: History of Wyoming; Historical outline of Wyoming; List of years in Wyoming; 2025 in the United States

The following is a list of events of the year 2025 in Wyoming.

== Incumbents ==
=== State government ===
- Governor: Mark Gordon (R)

== Events ==
- February 24 – Students from the University of Wyoming stage a 'die-in' inside the Wyoming State Capitol to protest the passing of House Bill 172, which repealed gun-free zones.
- July 11 – The United States opens its first rare earth mine in 70 years near Ranchester.
- September 21 – A natural gas pipeline ruptures west of Cheyenne, charring a freight train and sending a large flame into the sky.

== See also ==
- 2025 in the United States
