= Wild Horse Creek (Wyoming) =

Coordinates: 43.8961°N 105.5856°W

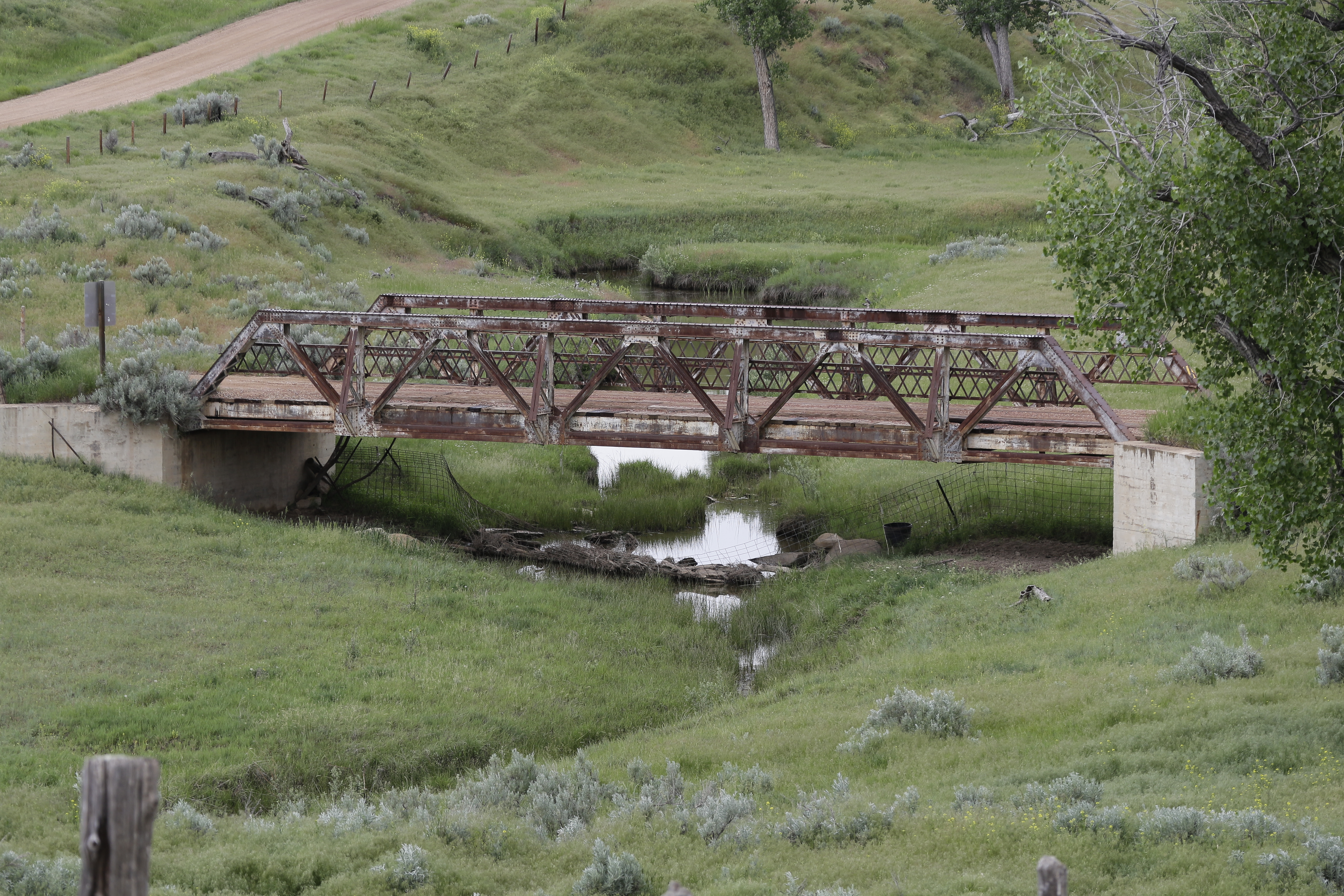
- Bridge across Wild Horse Creek near Arvada, Wyoming on Arvada-Gillette Road

Location
- Country: United States
- State: Wyoming

Wild Horse Creek is a tributary of the Powder River in Wyoming. The USGS has a station on the creek, near Arvada.
