= Mark Jennings (politician) =

Member of the Wyoming House of Representatives

Member of the Wyoming House of Representatives from the 30th district
- In office January 5, 2015 – January 6, 2025
- Preceded by: Kathy Coleman
- Succeeded by: Tom Kelly

Personal details
- Born: May 1, 1961 (age 65) Larned, Kansas, U.S.
- Party: Republican
- Spouse: Dana Jennings
- Children: 3
- Education: Cowley County Community College
- Profession: Small business owner (handyman)

Mark Jennings (born May 1, 1961) is an American politician who was a Republican member of the Wyoming House of Representatives representing District 30 from January 5, 2015 to January 6, 2025.

== Elections ==
=== 2014 ===
Jennings challenged incumbent Republican Representative Kathy Coleman in the August 19 Republican primary. He defeated Coleman, 66% to 34%. Jennings won the general election unopposed.

=== 2016 ===
Jennings defeated Gail Symons in the Republican primary with 60% of the vote, and defeated Democrat Val Burgess in the general election with 67.8% of the vote.
