= Wyoming's 30th House of Representatives district =

American legislative district

Wyoming's 30th State House of Representatives district
- Wyoming's 30th House of Representatives district as of 2022
Representative
Tom Kelly; R–Sheridan
- Demographics: 92% White; 4% Hispanic; 2% Native American; 2% Multiracial
- Population (2022): 9,611

Wyoming's 30th House of Representatives district is one of 62 districts in the Wyoming House of Representatives. The district encompasses part of Sheridan County. It is represented by Republican Representative Tom Kelly of Sheridan.

In 1992, the state of Wyoming switched from electing state legislators by county to a district-based system.

== List of members representing the district ==
Representative	Party	Term	Note
Bill Bensel	Democratic	1993 – 1999	Elected in 1992. Re-elected in 1994. Re-elected in 1996.
Jack Landon Jr.	Republican	1999 – 2011	Elected in 1998. Re-elected in 2000. Re-elected in 2002. Re-elected in 2004. Re-elected in 2006. Re-elected in 2008.
Jon Botten	Republican	2011 – 2012	Elected in 2010. Resigned in 2012.
Kathy Coleman	Republican	2012 – 2015	Appointed in 2012. Re-elected in 2012.
Mark Jennings	Republican	2015 – 2025	Elected in 2014. Re-elected in 2016. Re-elected in 2018. Re-elected in 2020. Re-elected in 2022.
Tom Kelly	Republican	2025 – present	Elected in 2024.
Ryan Koltiska	Republican	2027 – member-elect	Elected in 2026.

== Recent election results ==
=== 2014 ===
House district 30 general election
Party	Candidate	Votes	%
Republican	Mark Jennings	2,068	79.17%
Write-ins		544	20.82%
Total votes		2,612	100.0%
Invalid or blank votes		295	
Republican hold			

=== 2016 ===
House district 30 general election
Party	Candidate	Votes	%
Republican	Mark Jennings (Incumbent)	2,953	67.66%
Democratic	Val Burgess	1,402	32.12%
Write-ins		9	0.20%
Total votes		4,364	100.0%
Invalid or blank votes		142	
Republican hold			

=== 2018 ===
House district 30 general election
Party	Candidate	Votes	%
Republican	Mark Jennings (Incumbent)	2,870	96.30%
Write-ins		110	3.69%
Total votes		2,980	100.0%
Invalid or blank votes		571	
Republican hold			

=== 2020 ===
House district 30 general election
Party	Candidate	Votes	%
Republican	Mark Jennings (Incumbent)	3,985	95.40%
Write-ins		192	4.59%
Total votes		4,177	100.0%
Invalid or blank votes		879	
Republican hold			

=== 2022 ===
House district 30 general election
Party	Candidate	Votes	%
Republican	Mark Jennings (Incumbent)	2,912	95.41%
Write-ins		140	4.58%
Total votes		3,052	100.0%
Invalid or blank votes		568	
Republican hold			

=== 2024 ===
House district 30 general election
Party	Candidate	Votes	%
Republican	Tom Kelly	3,944	96.50%
Write-ins		143	3.49%
Total votes		4,087	100.0%
Invalid or blank votes		831	
Republican hold			

== Historical district boundaries ==
Map	Description	Apportionment Plan	Notes
	Sheridan County (part)	1992 Apportionment Plan	
	Sheridan County (part)	2002 Apportionment Plan	
	Sheridan County (part)	2012 Apportionment Plan	
