= 2023 in Wyoming =

- Decades: 2000s; 2010s; 2020s
- See also: History of Wyoming; Historical outline of Wyoming; List of years in Wyoming; 2023 in the United States

The following is a list of events of the year 2023 in Wyoming.

== Incumbents ==
=== State government ===
- Governor: Mark Gordon (R)

== Events ==
- June 23 – Eight people are injured after a tornado hits the North Antelope Rochelle Mine in Campbell County.
- October 29 – November 4: 2023 Mountain West Conference women's soccer tournament

== See also ==
- 2023 in the United States
