= Tom Kelly (Wyoming politician) =

American politician

Member of the Wyoming House of Representatives from the 30th district
- Incumbent
- Assumed office January 6, 2025
- Preceded by: Mark Jennings
- Succeeded by: Ryan Koltiska (elect)

Personal details
- Born: Elk Grove Village, Illinois
- Party: Republican
- Education: Northern Illinois University; Loyola University Chicago; University of Illinois Chicago
- Website: kellyfor30.com

Thomas (Tom) Kelly is an American politician. He serves as a Republican member for the 30th district in the Wyoming House of Representatives since 2025.

He is a professor and department chair at American Military University. In 2022 and 2026, he ran for Wyoming Superintendent of Public Instruction; however was defeated in the Republican primary in both attempts.
