= Frank Peasley =

Lawyer and state legislator in Wyoming

Member of the Wyoming House of Representatives
- In office 2009–2012

Personal details
- Born: Frank Daemon Peasley; December 16, 1943 Cheyenne, Wyoming, U.S.
- Died: January 3, 2025 (aged 81) Douglas, Wyoming, U.S.
- Party: Republican

Frank Daemon Peasley (December 16, 1943 – January 3, 2025) was a lawyer and state legislator in Wyoming.

He was born in Cheyenne, Wyoming. A Republican, he served two terms in the Wyoming House of Representatives. He represented Converse County and Platte County. After his death in 2025, Governor Mark Gordon ordered flags to fly at half-staff in his honor.
