= Wyoming's 37th House of Representatives district =

American legislative district

Wyoming's 37th State House of Representatives district
- Wyoming's 37th House of Representatives district as of 2022
Representative
Steve Harshman; R–Casper
- Demographics: 89% White; 1% Black; 7% Hispanic; 1% Asian; 3% Multiracial
- Population (2022): 10,528

Wyoming's 37th House of Representatives district is one of 62 districts in the Wyoming House of Representatives. The district encompasses part of Natrona County. It is represented by Republican Representative Steve Harshman of Casper.

In 1992, the state of Wyoming switched from electing state legislators by county to a district-based system.

== List of members representing the district ==
Representative	Party	Term	Note
Rick Tempest	Republican	1993 – 2003	Elected in 1992. Re-elected in 1994. Re-elected in 1996. Re-elected in 1998. Re-elected in 2000.
Steve Harshman	Republican	2003 – present	Elected in 2002. Re-elected in 2004. Re-elected in 2006. Re-elected in 2008. Re-elected in 2010. Re-elected in 2012. Re-elected in 2014. Re-elected in 2016. Re-elected in 2018. Re-elected in 2020. Re-elected in 2022. Re-elected in 2024.
Brian Costello	Republican	2027 – member-elect	Elected in 2026.

== Recent election results ==
=== 2014 ===
House district 37 general election
Party	Candidate	Votes	%
Republican	Steve Harshman (Incumbent)	2,477	72.85%
Independent	Anthony "Edis" Allen	907	26.67%
Write-ins		16	0.47%
Total votes		3,400	100.0%
Invalid or blank votes		307	
Republican hold			

=== 2016 ===
House district 37 general election
Party	Candidate	Votes	%
Republican	Steve Harshman (Incumbent)	3,885	79.38%
Democratic	Deirdre Stoelzle	975	19.92%
Write-ins		34	0.69%
Total votes		4,894	100.0%
Invalid or blank votes		235	
Republican hold			

=== 2018 ===
House district 37 general election
Party	Candidate	Votes	%
Republican	Steve Harshman (Incumbent)	3,215	96.69%
Write-ins		110	3.30%
Total votes		3,325	100.0%
Invalid or blank votes		733	
Republican hold			

=== 2020 ===
House district 37 general election
Party	Candidate	Votes	%
Republican	Steve Harshman (Incumbent)	4,335	96.65%
Write-ins		150	3.34%
Total votes		4,485	100.0%
Invalid or blank votes		767	
Republican hold			

=== 2022 ===
House district 37 general election
Party	Candidate	Votes	%
Republican	Steve Harshman (Incumbent)	2,799	93.76%
Write-ins		186	6.23%
Total votes		2,985	100.0%
Invalid or blank votes		787	
Republican hold			

=== 2024 ===
House district 37 general election
Party	Candidate	Votes	%
Republican	Steve Harshman (Incumbent)	4,004	95.60%
Write-ins		184	4.393%
Total votes		4,188	100.0%
Invalid or blank votes		961	
Republican hold			

== Historical district boundaries ==
Map	Description	Apportionment Plan	Notes
	Natrona County (part)	1992 Apportionment Plan	
	Natrona County (part)	2002 Apportionment Plan	
	Natrona County (part)	2012 Apportionment Plan	
