= Rory Cross =

American politician

Member of the Wyoming House of Representatives
- In office 1974–1992

Personal details
- Born: May 23, 1936 (age 90) Douglas, Wyoming, U.S.
- Party: Republican
- Occupation: rancher

William A. "Rory" Cross (born May 23, 1936) was an American politician in the state of Wyoming. He served in the Wyoming House of Representatives as a member of the Republican Party.

He served as Speaker of the Wyoming House of Representatives from 1991 to 1993. He attended Yale University and is a rancher.
