= Wyoming's 44th House of Representatives district =

American legislative district

Wyoming's 44th State House of Representatives district
- Wyoming's 44th House of Representatives district as of 2022
Representative
Lee Filer; R–Cheyenne
- Demographics: 60% White; 2% Black; 30% Hispanic; 2% Asian; 1% Native American; 3% Multiracial
- Population (2022): 9,661

Wyoming's 44th House of Representatives district is one of 62 districts in the Wyoming House of Representatives. The district encompasses part of Laramie County. It is represented by Republican Representative Lee Filer of Cheyenne.

In 1992, the state of Wyoming switched from electing state legislators by county to a district-based system.

== List of members representing the district ==
Representative	Party	Term	Note
E. Jayne Mockler	Democratic	1993 – 1997	Elected in 1992. Re-elected in 1994.
Floyd Esquibel	Democratic	1997 – 2009	Elected in 1996. Re-elected in 1998. Re-elected in 2000. Re-elected in 2002. Re-elected in 2004. Re-elected in 2006.
James W. Byrd	Democratic	2009 – 2019	Elected in 2008. Re-elected in 2010. Re-elected in 2012. Re-elected in 2014. Re-elected in 2016.
Sara Burlingame	Democratic	2019 – 2021	Elected in 2018.
John Romero-Martinez	Republican	2021 – 2023	Elected in 2020.
Tamara Trujillo	Republican	2023 – 2025	Elected in 2022.
Lee Filer	Republican	2025 – present	Elected in 2024.

== Recent election results ==
=== 2014 ===
House district 44 general election
Party	Candidate	Votes	%
Democratic	James W. Byrd (incumbent)	1,113	96.44%
Write-ins		41	3.55%
Total votes		1,154	100.0%
Invalid or blank votes		337	
Democratic hold			

=== 2016 ===
House district 44 general election
Party	Candidate	Votes	%
Democratic	James W. Byrd (incumbent)	1,412	53.74%
Republican	John Romero-Martinez	1,206	45.90%
Write-ins		9	0.34%
Total votes		2,627	100.0%
Invalid or blank votes		176	
Democratic hold			

=== 2018 ===
House district 44 general election
Party	Candidate	Votes	%
Democratic	Sara Burlingame	1,058	51.60%
Republican	Paul E. Johnson	989	48.24%
Write-ins		3	0.14%
Total votes		2,050	100.0%
Invalid or blank votes		49	
Democratic hold			

=== 2020 ===
House district 44 general election
Party	Candidate	Votes	%
Republican	John Romero-Martinez	1,552	50.42%
Democratic	Sara Burlingame	1,504	48.86%
Write-ins		22	0.71%
Total votes		3,078	100.0%
Invalid or blank votes		53	
Republican gain from Democratic			

=== 2022 ===
House district 44 general election
Party	Candidate	Votes	%
Republican	Tamara Trujillo	937	59.94%
Democratic	Sara Burlingame	616	39.41%
Write-ins		10	0.63%
Total votes		1,563	100.0%
Invalid or blank votes		18	
Republican hold			

=== 2024 ===
House district 44 general election
Party	Candidate	Votes	%
Republican	Lee Filer	2,265	93.59%
Write-ins		155	6.40%
Total votes		2,420	100.0%
Invalid or blank votes		298	
Republican hold			

== Historical district boundaries ==
Map	Description	Apportionment Plan	Notes
	Laramie County (part)	1992 Apportionment Plan	
	Laramie County (part)	2002 Apportionment Plan	
	Laramie County (part)	2012 Apportionment Plan	
