= KWRR (Wyoming) =

- Ethete, Wyoming; United States
- Frequency: 89.5 (MHz)

Programming
- Format: Public radio
- Affiliations: National Public Radio; Native Voice One

Ownership
- Owner: Business Council of the Northern Arapaho Tribe

History
- First air date: July 5, 1999
- Last air date: June 2018
- Call sign meaning: Wind River Reservation

Technical information
- Facility ID: 54539
- Class: C
- ERP: 85,000 watts
- HAAT: 555 meters (1,821 ft)
- Transmitter coordinates: 43°27′29.8″N 108°11′41.3″W

Links
- Webcast: Listen live
- Website: www.nv1.org/kwrr.html

KWRR (89.5 FM) was a public radio station in Ethete, Wyoming, serving residents of the Wind River Indian Reservation. Programming on KWRR consisted of local programming (including country music), plus programs from National Public Radio and Native Voice One.

After members of the Northern Arapaho Tribe voted in favor to starting a radio station, it was permitted in 1996. Construction was under way by 1997, but it missed a January 1998 start date due to difficulties bringing an electrical supply to the transmitter site. The station began broadcasting by July 5, 1999.

As of June 2018 the station was off the air. The Federal Communications Commission cancelled KWRR's license on October 4, 2021, due to the station failing to file an application to renew its license.

The Business Council of the Northern Arapaho Tribe holds a construction permit for KWRI (99.9 FM) at Ethete.
