= Jacob Wasserburger =

American politician

Member of the Wyoming House of Representatives from the 11th district
- Incumbent
- Assumed office January 6, 2025
- Preceded by: Jared Olsen

Personal details
- Party: Republican
- Website: jacob4wyoming.com

Jacob Wasserburger is an American politician. He serves as a Republican member for the 11th district in the Wyoming House of Representatives since 2025.
