= Speaker of the Wyoming House of Representatives =

American politician

The Speaker of the Wyoming House of Representatives is the presiding officer of the Wyoming House of Representatives. The Speaker has historically been a member of the majority party who is the de facto leader of their party. The current House Speaker is Chip Neiman of Hullet.

== Speakers of the Wyoming House of Representatives ==
Speakers of the Wyoming House of Representatives
Number	Name	Term	Party	Residence	Notes
1	Oliver P. Kellogg	1890-1893	Republican	Sundance	
2	L. C. Tidball	1893-1895	Populist	Sheridan	Elected Speaker with Democratic support
3	Jay L. Torrey	1895-1897	Republican	Big Piney	
4	Albert D. Kelley	1897-1899	Republican	Buffalo	
5	Levi R. Davis	1899-1901	Republican	Newcastle	
6	Jerome S. Atherly	1901-1905	Republican	Worland	Served two consecutive terms as Speaker
7	Lyman B. Cooper	1905-1907	Republican	Riverton	
8	Scott K. Snively	1907-1909	Republican	Sheridan	
9	Charles E. Hayden	1909-1911	Republican	Casper	
10	Levi R. Davis	1911-1913	Republican	Newcastle	Previously served as Speaker (1899–1901)
11	Martin L. Pratt	1913-1915	Republican	Powell	
12	James M. Graham	1915-1917	Republican	Lander	
13	W. K. Jones	1917-1919	Republican	Powell	
14	E. J. Sullivan	1919-1921	Republican	Casper	
15	Lewis R. Ewart	1921-1923	Republican	Cody	
16	J. D. Noblitt	1923-1925	Republican	Cokeville	
17	J. C. Underwood	1925-1927	Republican	Gillette	
18	A. W. McCollough	1927-1929	Republican	Laramie	
19	Marvin L. Bishop Jr.	1929-1931	Republican	Casper	
20	Charles B. Mann	1931-1933	Republican	Cowley	
21	William M. Jack	1933-1935	Democratic	Casper	Later served as State Auditor and Secretary of State; Nominee for governor in 1954
22	Henry Watenpaugh	1935-1937	Democratic	Sheridan	
23	Herman F. Krueger	1937-1939	Democratic	Powell	
24	Herbert Fowler	1939-1941	Republican	Newcastle	
25	Carl Robinson	1941-1943	Democratic	Afton	Later served as State Auditor
26	Richard J. Luman	1943-1945	Republican	Pinedale	Later served as State Treasurer
27	Walter W. Hudson	1945-1947	Republican	Veteran	
28	Homer Oxley	1947-1949	Republican	Lingle	
29	Herman Mayland	1949-1951	Republican	Lovell	
30	Frank C. Mockler	1951-1953	Republican	Dubois	
31	David Foote	1953-1955	Republican	Casper	
32	T. C. Daniels	1955-1957	Republican	Douglas	
33	Lee E. Keith	1957-1959	Republican	Kaycee	
34	Jay House	1959-1961	Democratic	Rawlins	
35	Joseph L. Budd	1961-1963	Republican	Big Piney	
36	Marlin Kurtz	1963-1965	Republican	Cody	
37	Walter Phelan	1965-1966	Democratic	Cheyenne	Died
38	Edness Kimball Wilkins	1966-1967	Democratic	Casper	First female Speaker of the House
39	William Swanton	1967-1969	Republican	Casper	
40	Verda James	1969-1971	Republican	Casper	First Republican female Speaker of the House
41	Ward Myers	1971-1973	Republican	Lovell	
42	Cliff Davis	1973-1975	Republican	Gillette	
43	Harold Hellbaum	1975-1977	Republican	Chugwater	
44	Nels J. Smith	1977-1979	Republican	Sundance	
45	Warren A. Morton	1979-1981	Republican	Casper	
46	Bob Burnett	1981-1983	Republican	Laramie	
47	Russell Donley III	1983-1985	Republican	Casper	
48	Jack Sidi	1985-1987	Republican	Casper	Later served as State Auditor
49	Patrick Meenan	1987-1989	Republican	Casper	
50	Bill McIlvain	1989-1991	Republican	Cheyenne	
51	William Cross	1991-1993	Republican	Douglas	
52	Douglas Chamberlain	1993-1995	Republican	LaGrange	
53	John Marton	1995-1997	Republican	Buffalo	
54	Bruce Hinchey	1997-1999	Republican	Casper	
55	Eli Bebout	1999-2001	Republican	Riverton	Nominee for governor in 2002; Later elected to the Wyoming Senate
56	Rick Tempest	2001-2003	Republican	Casper	
57	Fred Parady	2003-2005	Republican	Rock Springs	
58	Randall Luthi	2005-2007	Republican	Freedom	
59	Roy Cohee	2007-2009	Republican	Casper	
60	Colin Simpson	2009-2011	Republican	Cody	Candidate for governor in 2010
61	Edward Buchanan	2011-2013	Republican	Torrington	Former Wyoming Secretary of State (2018–2022)
62	Tom Lubnau	2013-2015	Republican	Gillette	
63	Kermit Brown	2015-2017	Republican	Laramie	
64	Steve Harshman	2017–2021	Republican	Casper	
65	Eric Barlow	2021–2023	Republican	Gillette	
66	Albert Sommers	2023–2025	Republican	Pinedale	
67	Chip Neiman	2025–present	Republican	Hulett	

== See also ==
- Wyoming House of Representatives
- Wyoming Legislature
