= Megan Degenfelder =

American politician

Wyoming Superintendent of Public Instruction
- Incumbent
- Assumed office January 2, 2023
- Governor: Mark Gordon
- Preceded by: Brian Schroeder (acting)

Personal details
- Born: November 15, 1988 (age 37) Casper, Wyoming, U.S.
- Party: Republican
- Spouse: Bryan Dugas
- Education: University of Wyoming (BA); University of International Business and Economics (MA)
- Website: Campaign website

Megan Marie Degenfelder (born November 15, 1988) is an American politician and businesswoman who has been the Wyoming Superintendent of Public Instruction since 2023. She is a member of the Republican Party. She ran to be the Republican Party nominee for governor of Wyoming in the 2026 election but lost to state senator Eric Barlow in the primary.

Degenfelder previously served as a Republican Precinct Committeewoman in Cheyenne and worked for then-U.S. Representative Cynthia Lummis. Prior to entering politics, Degenfelder worked in several fossil fuel companies throughout Wyoming.

== Early life ==
Degenfelder was born to Steve Degenfelder and Cheryl Lee Bressler in Casper, Wyoming on November 15, 1988. She spent most of her childhood in Casper. At age 21, she was diagnosed with thyroid cancer, which was successfully treated. She attempted to enlist for the Wyoming Air National Guard, however was rejected due to her cancer diagnosis.

Degenfelder attended Natrona County High School before studying at the University of Wyoming on a Hathaway Scholarship, where she earned a Bachelor of Science in economics and a Bachelor of Arts in political science. At the University of Wyoming, she played rugby and served as student council president. She later earned a Master of Arts in economics from the University of International Business and Economics.

After receiving her graduate degree, Degenfelder spent three years as a lobbyist working for Cloud Peak Energy, leasing coal, oil, and gas assets in Campbell, Converse and Sheridan counties in Wyoming. She also worked for three years as a lobbyist for a Texas-based natural resource producer in Carbon and Sweetwater counties.

== Political career ==
Degenfelder began her political career as the Republican Precinct Committeewoman in Cheyenne, Wyoming. She also previously worked with Cynthia Lummis when Lummis was a member of the U.S. House of Representatives. She also advocated against President Barack Obama's regulations on the fossil fuel industry.

Throughout her career, she has aligned herself with the MAGA movement and has been a vocal supporter of President Donald Trump.

=== Superintendent of Public Instruction ===
Degenfelder ran for Wyoming Superintendent of Public Instruction in the 2022 election. During the campaign, Degenfelder highlighted that as Public Instruction Superintendent, she would endorse school choice, create industrial partnerships in schools, improve K-3 literacy rates, reduce bureaucracy in education by limiting government involvement in teaching and promote a pro-American agenda. She narrowly won the Republican nomination, taking 40% of the vote, defeating incumbent superintendent Brian Schroeder. She would go on to win the general election in November, defeating Democratic nominee Sergio Maldonado.

During her tenure as superintendent, Degenfelder worked with a group of stakeholders to establish a guide in creating policies to provide or restrict books in schools. She also supported legislation to authorize charter schools and a voucher program to make public funds available for private tuition. She has further supported limiting transgender students’ participation in school sports and bathroom accessibility, accusing "[c]oastal elites" of seeking to "redefine genders, threatening our young women."

In 2024, she partnered worked alongside Governor Mark Gordon and State Attorney General Bridget Hill to challenge the Biden administration's Title IX rules that prohibited blanket bans on transgender athletes competing with and against members of their preferred gender. That same year, she openly criticized the proposed sale of the Kelly parcel to Grand Teton National Park, stating she would rather have oil and gas development companies purchase the Kelly parcel. She criticized Governor Gordon of the decision and accused him of "making a backroom deal" with the National Park Service.

In 2025, Degenfelder openly expressed her support of the second Trump administration's steps in reducing the staff and capacity of the Department of Education. She stated that the move would allow local communities and parents to have greater control in education decisions. That same year, she released her legislative agenda which aimed to cement school choice, increase awareness of student mental health, allow concealed carry on school grounds, reduce DEI practices, and ban transgender athletes in schools.

=== 2026 gubernatorial campaign ===
In January 2026, Degenfelder announced her candidacy for governor of Wyoming in the 2026 election. Days before she announced her campaign, President Donald Trump said he would endorse her campaign and nicknamed her "MAGA Megan". In March 2026, her campaign was endorsed by Speaker pro tempore of the State House Jeremy Haroldson, State House Majority Leader Scott Heiner and U.S. Representative Harriet Hageman.

Eric Barlow defeated Degenfelder by a wide margin in the August 18, 2026 Republican primary for governor.

== Personal life ==
Degenfelder is married to WWAMI graduate and anesthesiologist Bryan Dugas; the couple lives in Laramie, Wyoming.

She also coaches the University of Wyoming women's rugby team. An avid hunter, she was part of the first all-women’s team at the One Shot Antelope Hunt in Cheyenne.

== Electoral history ==
2022 Wyoming Superintendent of Public Instruction Republican primary election
| Party | Candidate | Votes | % |
|---|---|---|---|
| Republican | Megan Degenfelder | 59,334 | 40.58% |
| Republican | Brian Schroeder (incumbent) | 55,769 | 38.14% |
| Republican | Jennifer Zerba | 13,662 | 9.34% |
| Republican | Thomas Kelly (withdrawn) | 12,347 | 8.44% |
| Republican | Robert J. White III | 4,396 | 3.01% |
| Write-in | | 721 | 0.49% |
| Total votes | | 146,229 | 100% |

2022 Wyoming Superintendent of Public Instruction election
| Party | Candidate | Votes | % |
|---|---|---|---|
| Republican | Megan Degenfelder | 142,524 | 76.72% |
| Democratic | Sergio Maldonado | 43,251 | 23.28% |
| Total votes | | 185,775 | 100.0 |
| Republican hold | | | |

Political offices
| Preceded by Brian Schroeder; Acting | Wyoming Superintendent of Public Instruction; 2023–present | Incumbent |
