= Laramie County Community College =

Public college in Cheyenne, Wyoming, US

- Other name: LCCC
- Type: Public community college
- Established: 1968; 58 years ago
- Endowment: $2.1 million
- Budget: $70,844,840
- President: Joe Schaffer
- Academic staff: 121 full-time, 157 part-time
- Total staff: 359 Full-time employees (including faculty)
- Students: 5,389 (fall 2022)
- Location: Cheyenne, Wyoming, United States
- Campus: 271 acres (110 ha)
- Colors: Yellow and Blue
- Nickname: Golden Eagles
- Sporting affiliations: NJCAA
- Mascot: Talon the Golden Eagle
- Website: www.lccc.wy.edu

Laramie County Community College (LCCC) is a public community college in Cheyenne, Laramie County, Wyoming, with an additional outreach campus in Laramie, in Albany County. The college also houses an outreach center in Pine Bluffs. In fall 2022, it enrolled 5,389 students, including 1,373 full-time students.

LCCC is the second-largest higher education institution in the state of Wyoming, behind the University of Wyoming. It is accredited by the Higher Learning Commission. The college offers 2 bachelor's degree programs, 44 associate degree programs, and 30 certificates.

== History ==
LCCC was founded in 1968, with campus construction commencing on 168 acres of pasture donated by Dorian Lummis and the Arp family. In its initial stages, the institution operated with a modest staff of 25 full-time employees and offered 18 programs.

On September 17, 2026 the LCCC Board of Trustees voted to adopt President Joe Schaffer’s recommendation to change the college’s name to Wyoming State College. The name change will take effect July 1, 2027.

== Academics ==
LCCC awarded 783 degrees and certificates during the 2022-2023 academic year.

- 85 Associate of Arts degree
- 14 Bachelor of Applied Science degrees
- 157 Associate of Science degrees
- 154 Associate of Applied Science degrees
- 104 Certificates of Completion
- 48 Associate Degrees in Nursing
- 221 Credit Diploma

Laramie County Community College currently offers classes at a range of levels, from remedial, high-school level (non-college credit) courses up to 2000-level courses.

The college has articulation agreements with about 20 universities, including the University of Wyoming in Laramie, to make sure that most class credits will transfer. LCCC offers teleconference courses as well as online courses. It also serves as a video-conference site for Outreach Credit Programs from the University of Wyoming.

In addition to college credit courses, LCCC offers noncredit courses through the Workforce & Community Development division, which aims to build a stronger workforce and community through partnerships, outreach, professional and workforce training, career services, facility rentals, academic refreshers, and life enrichment classes.

== Student services ==
LCCC's Cheyenne campus offers a variety of student services, including but not limited to free counseling and advising, on-campus residence halls, dining, free tutoring, free online paper reviews, free access to the Physical Education facilities, and an on-site bookstore. There are also low-cost services available to the community, including equipment rental and use of the site's facilities for conferences and meetings. All student services offered through the main campus in Cheyenne are available to Albany County Campus students in Laramie. Numerous services are available directly on the Albany County Campus.

== Athletics ==
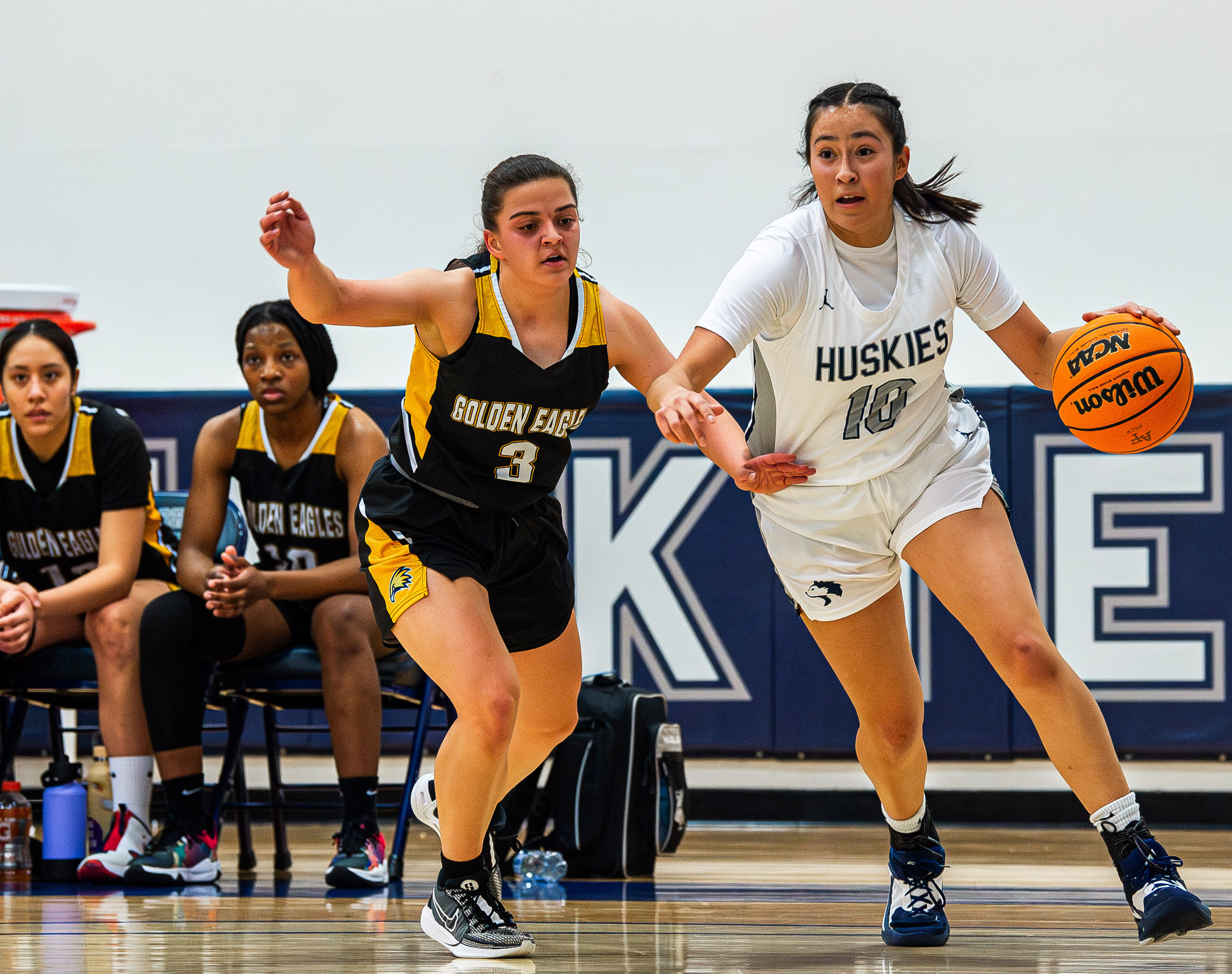
A Golden Eagles women's basketball game against the United States Air Force Academy Preparatory School in December 2023

A member of the National Junior College Athletic Association, LCCC competes in men's basketball, women's volleyball, and men's and women's soccer in Region IX and has 32 total clubs and teams. The college has a rodeo team and is a member of the National Intercollegiate Rodeo Association.

The Recreation and Athletics Center hosts basketball games and volleyball matches.

== Publications ==
LCCC's students publish a newspaper titled Wingspan, as well as a yearly literary and art magazine, High Plains Register. Publishing classes may be taken for college credit. The LCCC Public Relations Department produces a magazine,The Talon, as well as numerous other publications and multimedia products.

== Fine arts ==
The college has its own art display, the Esther and John Clay Fine Arts Gallery. The gallery is open Monday-Friday and admission is free. Traveling collections are often displayed, as well as artwork by LCCC students.
