= 2026 Wyoming elections =

- August 19 (primary); November 3 (general)

The 2026 Wyoming elections were held in large part on November 3, 2026, to elect members of the federal, state, and local governments.

== Election schedule ==
- August 18, 2026: State, federal, and local primaries.
- November 3, 2026: General election.
