= Harriet Hageman =

American politician (born 1962)

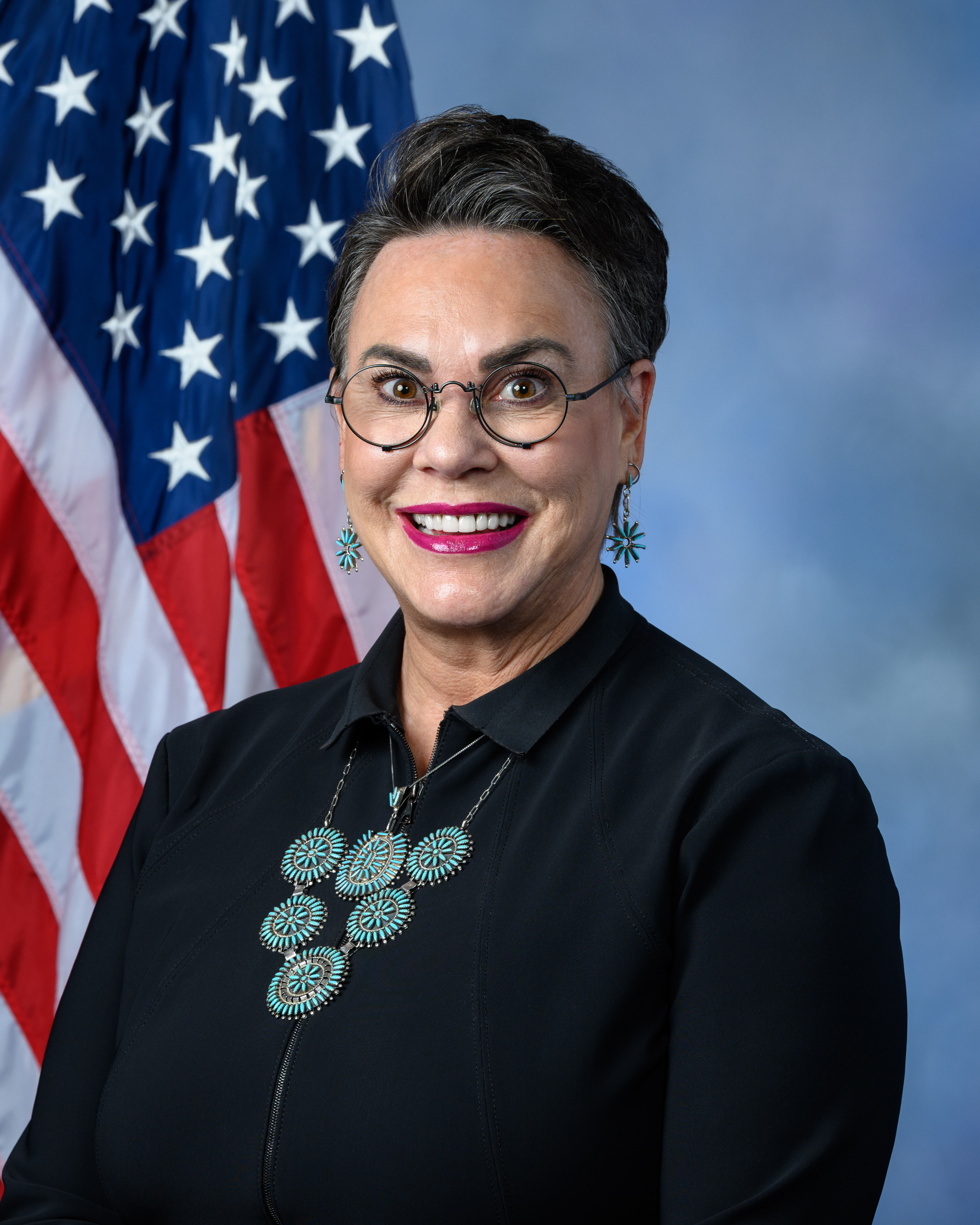
- Official portrait, 2023

United States Senator-elect from Wyoming
- Assuming office January 3, 2027
- Succeeding: Cynthia Lummis

Member of the U.S. House of Representatives from Wyoming's at-large district
- Incumbent
- Assumed office January 3, 2023
- Preceded by: Liz Cheney

Personal details
- Born: Harriet Maxine Hageman; October 18, 1962 (age 64) Douglas, Wyoming, U.S.
- Party: Republican
- Spouse: John Sundahl
- Parent: James Hageman (father)
- Education: Casper College (attended); University of Wyoming (BS, JD)
- Website: House website Campaign website
- Hageman's voice Hageman supporting the grizzly bear's removal from the Endangered and Threatened Wildlife List. Recorded March 23, 2023

Harriet Maxine Hageman (born October 18, 1962) is an American politician and attorney who is a United States senator-elect from Wyoming. Since 2023, she has served as the U.S. representative for Wyoming's at-large congressional district.

Born in Douglas, Wyoming, and raised on a ranch outside of Fort Laramie, Wyoming, Hageman holds degrees from the University of Wyoming and has spent her career as a trial attorney. She unsuccessfully ran for the Republican nomination for governor of Wyoming in 2018 and later served as a member of the Republican National Committee. With the endorsement of President Donald Trump, Hageman later defeated incumbent representative Liz Cheney, a Trump critic and vice chair of the House January 6 Committee, by a landslide in the 2022 Republican primary election, garnering over twice as many votes as Cheney while spending less than a quarter of Cheney's campaign expenditures.

Hageman was sworn into Congress on January 3, 2023, and she won re-election in 2024. In 2026, she ran for that year's Wyoming Senate election, defeating Democrat James W. Byrd. She is expected to take office on January 3, 2027, and succeed incumbent Republican senator Cynthia Lummis.

== Early life and education ==
Harriet Maxine Hageman was born in Douglas, Wyoming, on October 18, 1962, and grew up on a ranch outside of Fort Laramie, Wyoming, near the Nebraska border. Her father, James Hageman, served as a longtime member of the Wyoming House of Representatives until his death in 2006. She is a fourth-generation Wyomingite; her great-grandfather, James Clay Shaw, moved to the then-Wyoming Territory from Texas in 1878.

After graduating from Lingle/Fort Laramie High School, Hageman earned a Bachelor of Science degree in business administration from the University of Wyoming and a Juris Doctor from the University of Wyoming College of Law.

== Legal career ==
Hageman served as a law clerk for Judge James E. Barrett of the United States Court of Appeals for the Tenth Circuit. She has since worked as a trial attorney. In 1997, Hageman represented Wyoming in Nebraska v. Wyoming, a dispute over management of the North Platte River. In the case, she advocated against the United States Forest Service's roadless rule and lost. In the 2016 Republican Party presidential primaries, Hageman supported U.S. senator Ted Cruz and criticized Donald Trump.

Hageman was a candidate in the 2018 Wyoming gubernatorial election, placing third after investment manager Foster Friess and the eventual winner, state treasurer Mark Gordon. Hageman was the Republican National committeewoman for Wyoming in 2020 and 2021.

== United States Representative ==
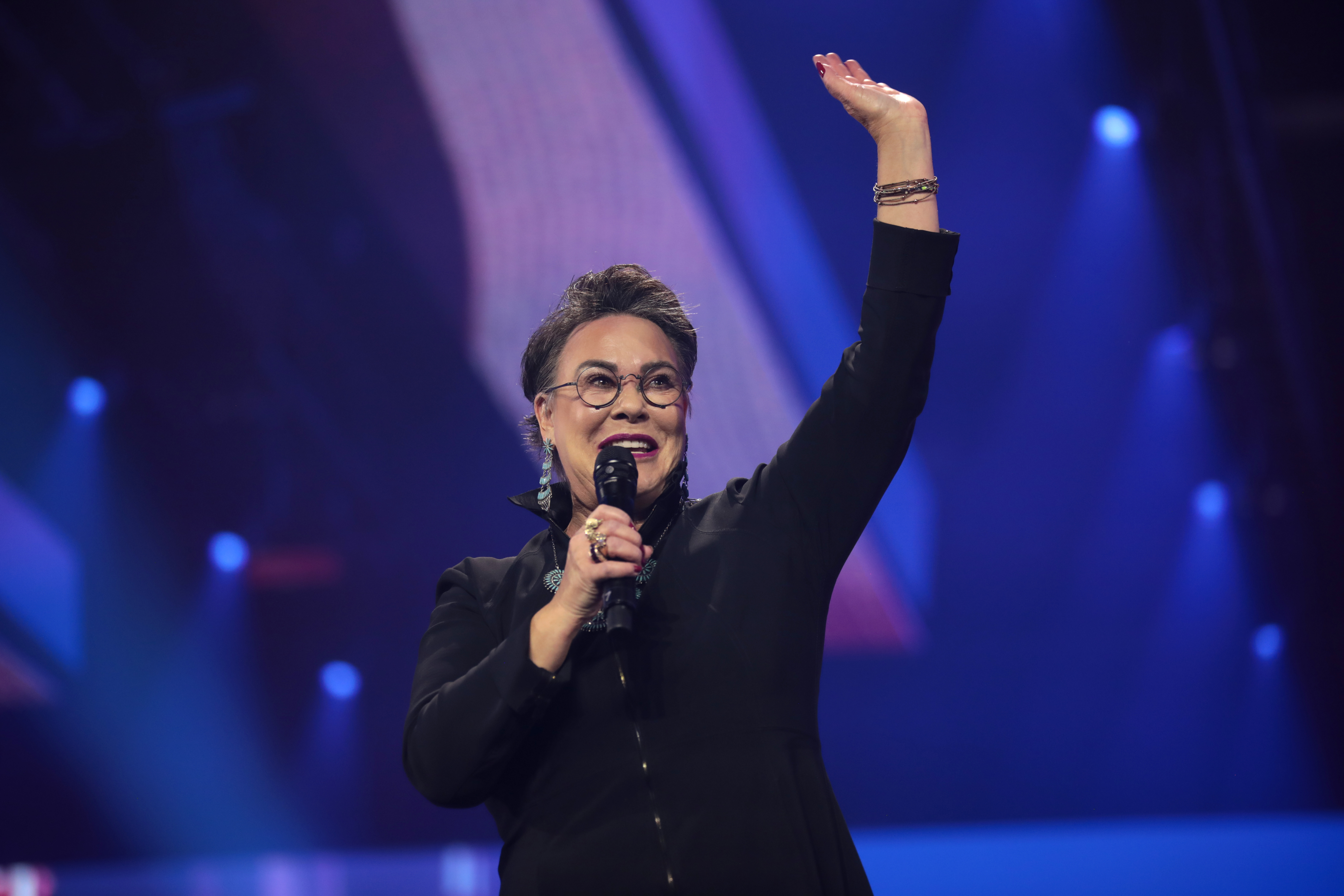
Hageman at AmericaFest in 2022.

=== Elections ===
==== 2022 ====
On September 9, 2021, Hageman announced her candidacy for Wyoming's at-large congressional district, challenging three-term incumbent Liz Cheney for the Republican nomination in the 2022 election. In her campaign announcement, Hageman claimed that Cheney no longer represented the people of Wyoming due to her opposition to Trump's efforts to overturn the 2020 election and her vote to impeach him during Trump's second impeachment. Noting that Trump had carried Wyoming by landslide majorities in both of his campaigns, Hageman said that by opposing Trump, Cheney "betrayed Wyoming, she betrayed this country, and she betrayed me". She formally launched her campaign at a Cheyenne hotel later that day, saying that Wyoming needed someone in Congress "who represents Wyoming's conservative values" and had "Wyoming's best interests at heart". She also claimed that Cheney's drive to "destroy President Trump" made her ineffective in Washington. Two other primary challengers dropped out and endorsed Hageman. She was quickly endorsed by Trump, who had personally interviewed several prospective primary challengers to Cheney.

Hageman and Cheney had been close political allies for several years. Hageman was an adviser to Cheney's brief 2014 Senate campaign, and introduced Cheney at a rally during Cheney's first congressional bid in 2016. According to Hageman, the relationship cooled when Cheney criticized Trump for not acting on claims that Russia put bounties on American troops in Afghanistan and chilled even further when Cheney called for Trump to acknowledge that he had lost the 2020 election. Hageman claimed that when Cheney called her to say that any claims about irregularities in the 2020 election were untrue, "that was probably the end of our relationship". She added that had she known that Cheney would have voted to impeach Trump, she "never would have answered [Cheney's] first phone call" in 2016. Hageman later claimed that Cheney and others had deceived her into opposing Trump but dismissed her previous opposition to Trump as "ancient history". In a statement to The New York Times, she called Trump "the greatest president of my lifetime."

Besides Trump, Hageman was endorsed by many other prominent Republicans, including House Minority Leader Kevin McCarthy. She also received campaign support from several Trump administration staffers, including Bill Stepien, Justin R. Clark, and Tim Murtaugh. In January 2022, it was reported that Hageman's campaign had raised $1 million, to Cheney's $4.5 million.

Hageman raced out to a large lead in opinion polling. A University of Wyoming poll taken a week before the election showed Hageman with a 29-point lead over Cheney. She defeated Cheney in the Republican primary in a landslide, winning 66.3% of the vote to Cheney's 28.9%. Hageman carried all but two counties in the state, Cheney's home county of Teton County, and Albany County, home to the University of Wyoming.

In the general election, Hageman faced Democratic nominee and Native American activist Lynnette Grey Bull, who was Cheney's opponent in 2020. Hageman was overwhelmingly favored. Republicans had a nearly 7-to-1 advantage in registration over Democrats, and Trump won the state in 2020 with almost 70% of the vote, his strongest state-level performance in the nation.

Hageman won the 2022 election handily, defeating Grey Bull, 67% to 24%. Upon taking office in 2023, she became the fourth consecutive Republican woman to represent Wyoming in the House, after Barbara Cubin, Cynthia Lummis, and Cheney.

=== Tenure ===
In the contested 2023 Speaker of the United States House of Representatives election, though many of Hageman's colleagues in the Freedom Caucus refused to support Kevin McCarthy, Hageman backed him on every ballot.

Hageman in March 2025 attended a town hall meeting with hundreds in the audience in Albany County, Wyoming, where she received a negative audience response when discussing multiple issues, including the downsizing of the federal government initiated by Elon Musk's Department of Government Efficiency. Hageman told the audience: "It's so bizarre to me how obsessed you are with federal government … I'm sorry, your hysteria is just really over the top"; amid the hostile response, Hageman ended the event 15 minutes early.

=== Committee assignments ===
- Committee on the Judiciary
  - Subcommittee on the Administrative State, Regulatory Reform, and Antitrust
  - Subcommittee on the Constitution and Limited Government
- Committee on Natural Resources
  - Subcommittee on Energy and Mineral Resources
  - Subcommittee on Water, Wildlife and Fisheries (Chair)
- Previous
  - House Judiciary Select Subcommittee on the Weaponization of the Federal Government
  - House Natural Resources Subcommittee on Indian and Insular Affairs (Chair)

=== Caucus memberships ===
- Congressional Western Caucus
- Republican Study Committee
- Freedom Caucus (left caucus)

== Political positions ==
Hageman calls herself an "unyielding conservative". During her gubernatorial campaign, she claimed that government was too pervasive in American lives, to the point that it was replacing "community, the organizations you belong to, and family support." Along similar lines, during her congressional campaign, she highlighted her past work in "defending our great state against the excess of government". She argued that as part of her plan to "protect Wyoming", her priorities would be "energy independence, regulatory reform, restor[ing] power to the states, protection of our southern border and enforcement of our immigration laws." She added that while in Congress, she would "focus on what is in the best interest of the United States, and, specifically, what is in the best interest of Wyoming." She believes the framers of the Constitution intended for "the Legislative Branch—and only the Legislative Branch" to make law.

=== Public lands sale proposal ===
In 2025, Senator Mike Lee (R–Utah) introduced a provision in the Senate Republicans' budget reconciliation bill, the One Big Beautiful Bill Act to mandate the sale of 0.5 percent to 0.75 percent of BLM and U.S. Forest Service lands in 11 Western states, including Wyoming. Hageman supported the measure, describing it as narrow and community-focused, targeting small, underutilized parcels near towns

However, groups such as the Wilderness Society argued the bill’s language allowed up to 250 million acres to be sold, warning of privatization risks. The Outdoor Recreation Roundtable and other stakeholders criticized the plan as harmful to rural economies and public access.

Widespread opposition culminated in a bipartisan rally at the Wyoming State Capitol with over 500 attendees. Critics argued that even "less iconic" public lands are vital for local recreation and that the bill bypassed traditional oversight. Lee withdrew the proposal on June 28, 2025, citing the inability to block foreign and corporate land purchases.

=== Other positions ===
Hageman is a vocal supporter of the fossil fuel industry, saying at an August 2022 campaign event that coal is an "affordable, clean, acceptable resource that we all should be using".

Speaking about presumptive Democratic presidential candidate Kamala Harris in July 2024, Hageman called Harris "a DEI hire" (a reference to diversity, equity, and inclusion initiatives) who is "intellectually, just really kind of the bottom of the barrel".

== Personal life ==
Hageman is married to Cheyenne-based medical malpractice defense attorney John Sundahl. She is a Protestant.

== Electoral history ==
2018 Wyoming gubernatorial election - Republican primary
Party	Candidate	Votes	%
Republican	Mark Gordon	38,951	33.0
Republican	Foster Friess	29,842	25.3
Republican	Harriet Hageman	25,052	21.2
Republican	Sam Galeotos	14,554	12.3
Republican	Taylor Haynes	6,511	5.5
Republican	Bill Dahlin	1,763	1.5
n/a	Under votes	1,269	1.1
Republican	Write-ins	113	0.0
n/a	Over votes	46	0.0
Total votes		118,101	100.0

2022 United States House of Representatives election in Wyoming - Republican primary
Party	Candidate	Votes	%
Republican	Harriet Hageman	113,025	66.3
Republican	Liz Cheney (incumbent)	49,316	28.9
Republican	Anthony Bouchard	4,505	2.6
Republican	Denton Knapp	2,258	1.3
Republican	Robyn Belinskey	1,305	0.8
Total votes		170,409	100.0

2022 Wyoming's at-large congressional district election
Party	Candidate	Votes	%	±%
Republican	Harriet Hageman	132,206	68.18%	−0.37
Democratic	Lynnette Grey Bull	47,250	24.37%	−0.22
Libertarian	Richard Brubaker	5,420	2.80%	−0.95
Write-in		4,521	2.33%	+1.14
Constitution	Marissa Selvig	4,505	2.32%	−0.60
Total votes		193,902	100.00%	N/A
Republican hold				

2024 Wyoming's at-large congressional district election
Party	Candidate	Votes	%	±%
Republican	Harriet Hageman (incumbent)	184,680	70.61%	+2.43
Democratic	Kyle Cameron	60,778	23.24%	−1.13
Libertarian	Richard Brubaker	9,223	3.53%	+0.73
Constitution	Jeffrey Haggit	5,362	2.05%	−0.27
Write-in		1,505	0.58%	-1.75
Total votes		261,548	100.00%	N/A
Republican hold				

== See also ==
- Women in the United States House of Representatives

U.S. House of Representatives
Preceded by Liz Cheney	Member of the U.S. House of Representatives from Wyoming's at-large congressional district 2023–present	Incumbent
Party political offices
Preceded by Cynthia Lummis	Republican nominee for U.S. Senator from Wyoming (Class 2); 2026	Most recent
U.S. Senate
Preceded by Cynthia Lummis	U.S. Senator (Class 2) from Wyoming; Taking office 2027; Served alongside: John Barrasso	Elect
U.S. order of precedence (ceremonial)
Preceded by Dan Goldman	United States representatives by seniority 313th	Succeeded by Erin Houchin
