= Wyoming Department of Education =

State education agency of Wyoming

Agency overview
- Website: edu.wyoming.gov

The Wyoming Department of Education (WDE) is the state education agency of Wyoming. It was headquartered on the second floor of the Hathaway Building in Cheyenne. In Spring 2018, WDE moved to the 2nd Floor of the Herschler Building. The agency has offices in Laramie and Riverton.

The Department is under the leadership of the Superintendent of Public Instruction Megan Degenfelder as of January 2023.

The department manages the Wyoming Community College Commission, a network of public community colleges.

== See also ==
- List of colleges and universities in Wyoming
