= List of appointed members of the Wyoming Legislature =

When a vacancy occurs in the Wyoming Legislature, new members are appointed to fill the resultant vacancy. As per Wyoming law, in the case of a legislative vacancy, the political party which the previous incumbent identified with upon assuming office is contacted. The party is to produce a list of three candidates. The board or boards of county commissioners of the legislative district then vote to appoint a member to fill the vacancy from the list. If the previous incumbent identified with no party, any qualified individual in the district is able to apply to seek appointment. The appointee serves the remainder of the previous incumbent's term, until the next general election.

== List of appointed members of the Wyoming House of Representatives ==
Year	Dist.	Incumbent	Party	Appointee	Party	Cause	Ref.
1995	12th	Sherri L. Wooldridge	Dem.	Leo Garcia	Dem.	Resigned	
1995	7th	Ace Baty	Rep.	Tony Ross	Rep.	Death	
1996	25th	John DeWitt	Rep.	Denny Smith	Rep.	Death	
1997	19th	Wayne Morrow	Dem.	Peggy L. Rounds	Dem.	Resigned	
1999	49th	Virginia Casady	Dem.	C. Elaine Phillips	Dem.	Resigned	
1999	25th	Denny Smith	Rep.	Alan C. Jones	Rep.	Death	
1999	59th	Nancy Berry	Dem.	Dick Sadler	Dem.	Resigned	
2000	13th	Jim Rose	Dem.	Jane Warren	Dem.	Resigned	
2002	15th	Tony Rose	Rep.	Dave Rader	Rep.	Resigned	
2002	53rd	Nick Deegan	Dem.	Don Warfield	Dem.	Resigned	
2003	39th	Christopher Boswell	Dem.	John Hastert	Dem.	Resigned	
2004	33rd	Harry B. Tipton	Rep.	Jim Allen	Rep.	Death	
2004	31st	Jene Jansen	Rep.	Tom Lubnau	Rep.	Resigned	
2005	53rd	Frank W. Latta	Rep.	Erin E. Mercer	Rep.	Resigned	
2006	9th	Bryan Pedersen	Rep.	David Zwonitzer	Rep.	Resigned	
2006	5th	James Hageman	Rep.	Matt Teeters	Rep.	Death	
2007	36th	Liz Gentile	Dem.	Mary Hales	Dem.	Resigned	
2008	56th	Tom Walsh	Rep.	Tim Stubson	Rep.	Resigned	
2008	48th	Marty Martin	Dem.	Joseph M. Barbuto (Note: The candidate was elected in the general election to the seat prior to their appointment.)	Dem.	Resigned	
2009	49th	Saundra Meyer	Dem.	Terry Kimble	Dem.	Resigned	
2009	53rd	Erin E. Mercer	Rep.	Gregg Blikre	Rep.	Resigned	
2011	58th	Lisa Shepperson	Rep.	Tom Reeder	Rep.	Resigned	
2012	30th	Jon Botten	Rep.	Kathy Coleman	Rep.	Resigned	
2014	52nd	Sue Wallis	Rep.	Troy Mader	Rep.	Death	
2015	29th	John Patton	Rep.	Mark Kinner	Rep.	Death	
2016	12th	Harlan Edmonds	Rep.	Lars Lone	Rep.	Resigned	
2017	35th	Kendell Kroeker	Rep.	Joe MacGuire	Rep.	Resigned	
2017	48th	Mark Baker	Rep.	Clark Stith	Rep.	Resigned	
2017	21st	Robert McKim	Rep.	Evan Simpson	Rep.	Resigned	
2018	12th	Lars Lone	Rep.	Clarence Styvar	Rep.	Resigned	
2020	53rd	Roy Edwards	Rep.	Chris Knapp	Rep.	Death	
2020	59th	Bunky Loucks	Rep.	Kevin O'Hearn	Rep.	Resigned	
2021	2nd	Hans Hunt	Rep.	J. D. Williams	Rep.	Resigned	
2025	10th	John Eklund Jr.	Rep.	Justin Fornstrom	Rep.	Death	

== List of appointed Wyoming state senators ==
Year	Dist.	Incumbent	Party	Appointee	Party	Cause	Ref.
1993	20th	John Rankine	Rep.	Gerald Geis	Rep.	Resigned	
1993	22nd	Robert H. Trent	Rep.	John Schiffer	Rep.	Resigned	
1993	28th	Susan Anderson	Rep.	Mary C. MacGuire	Rep.	Resigned	
2002	14th	Mark O. Harris	Dem.	Larry Caller	Dem.	Resigned	
2003	1st	Billie L. Barton	Rep.	Charles Townsend	Rep.	Resigned	
2004	6th	Rich Cathcart	Dem.	Jana H. Ginter	Dem.	Resigned	
2005	19th	Laness Northrup	Rep.	R. Ray Peterson	Rep.	Death	
2007	26th	Bob Peck	Rep.	Eli Bebout	Rep.	Death	
2007	27th	John Barrasso	Rep.	Bill Landen	Rep.	Resigned	
2008	12th	Rae Lynn Job	Dem.	Marty Martin	Dem.	Resigned	
2009	5th	Bob Fecht	Rep.	Rick Hunnicutt	Rep.	Resigned	
2009	11th	Bill Vasey	Dem.	James Elliott	Dem.	Resigned	
2009	15th	Ken Decaria	Dem.	Saundra Meyer	Dem.	Resigned	
2014	22nd	John Schiffer	Rep.	Dave Kinskey	Rep.	Death	
2015	2nd	Jim Anderson	Rep.	Brian Boner	Rep.	Resigned	
2022	29th	Drew Perkins	Rep.	Bob Ide	Rep.	Resigned	
2025	6th	Darin Smith	Rep.	Taft Love	Rep.	Resigned	

== See also ==
- List of special elections to the Wyoming Legislature
