= Donald Scott =

Donald Scott may refer to:

== Sportspeople ==
- Donald Scott (middle-distance runner) (1894–1980), American middle-distance runner and modern pentathlete
- Donald Scott (triple jumper) (born 1992), American triple jumper
- Don Scott (American football) (died 1943), American footballer for Ohio State University
- Don Scott (boxer) (1928–2013), British Olympic boxer
- Don Scott (Canadian football) (1927–2005), played for Toronto Argonauts
- Donald Scott (cricketer) (1898–1981), played first-class cricket for Somerset
- Don Scott (footballer, born 1929), Australian rules footballer for West Perth, South Melbourne, Swan Districts and Waverley
- Don Scott (footballer, born 1930) (1930–2002), Australian rules footballer for Geelong
- Don Scott (footballer, born 1947), Australian rules footballer for Hawthorn
- Donald Scott (rugby union) (born 1928), Scotland rugby union player
- Donnie Scott (born 1961), American baseball catcher and manager

== Other people ==
- Donald P. Scott, killed during a police raid in 1992
- Donald Scott (politician) (1901–1974), British politician
- Don Scott (Alberta politician) (born 1966), Canadian politician from Alberta
- Don Scott (Manitoba politician) (born 1948), Canadian politician from Manitoba
- Don Scott (Ontario author) (1924–2011), Canadian author and politician
- Don Scott (Virginia politician), American politician from Virginia
- Don Scott (Wyoming politician), American politician from Wyoming

== Other uses ==
- Ohio State University Airport, nicknamed OSU Don Scott Airport
