= 2026 Wyoming State Treasurer election =

- November 3, 2026
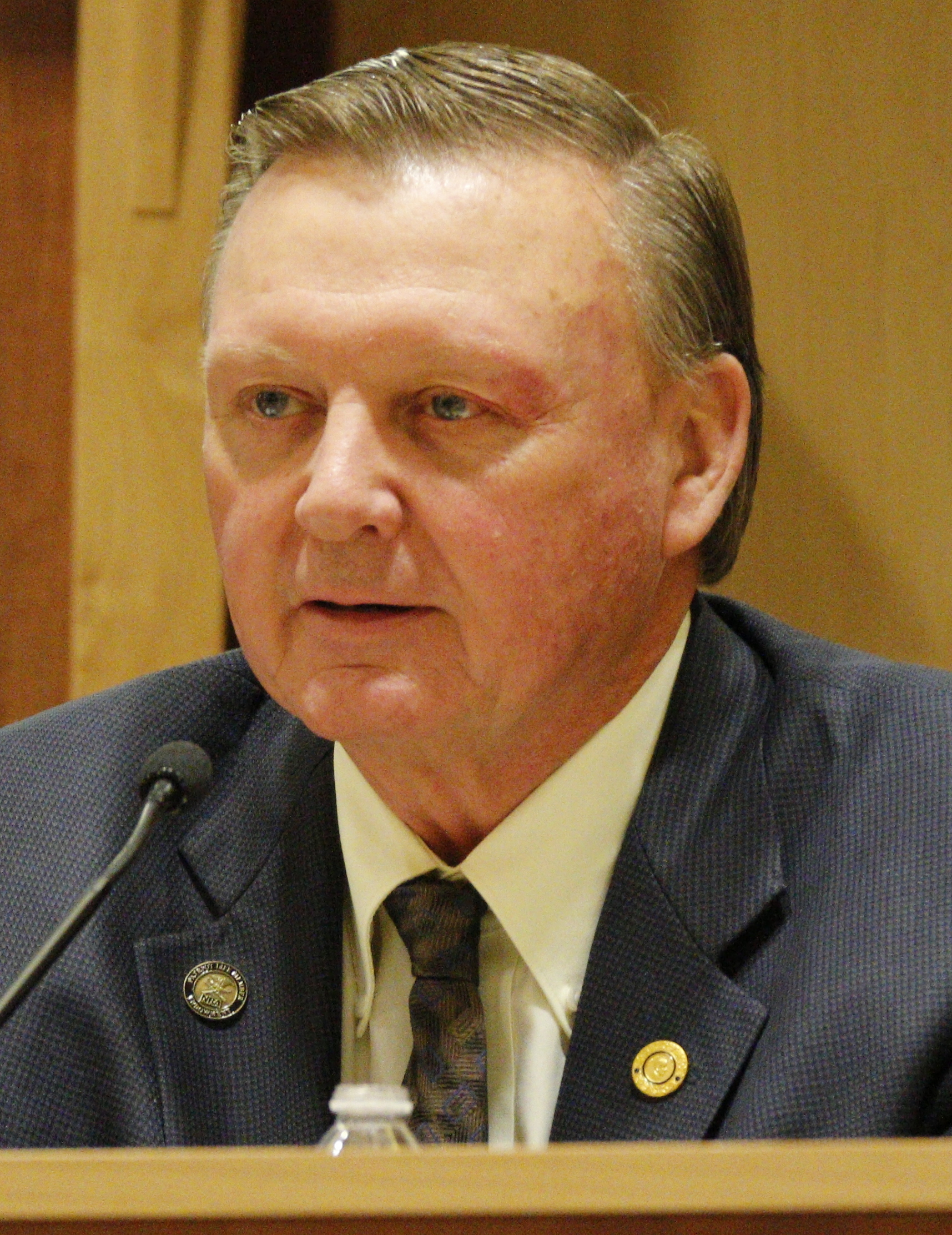
Nominee	Curt Meier
Party	Republican
Popular vote	155,028
Percentage	98.0%
State Treasurer before election
Curt Meier
Republican
Elected State Treasurer
Curt Meier
Republican

The 2026 Wyoming State Treasurer election was held on November 3, 2026, to elect the Treasurer of Wyoming, concurrently with elections to the United States Senate, U.S. House of Representatives, governor, and other state and local elections. Primary elections were held on August 18, 2026. Incumbent treasurer Curt Meier was re-elected automatically to a third-term after the primary; as there were no other candidates in the general election.

Meier faced opposition in the Republican primary; but ultimately defeated Scott Smith for the nomination.

== Republican primary ==
=== Candidates ===
==== Nominee ====
- Curt Meier, incumbent state treasurer

==== Eliminated in primary ====
- Scott Smith, state representative from the 5th district (2023–present)

=== Endorsements ===
Scott Smith

Political parties

- Wyoming Republican Party

=== Results ===
Primary results by county: Meier: 50–60%; 60–70%; 70–80%

Republican primary results
Party	Candidate	Votes	%
Republican	Curt Meier (incumbent)	78,702	68.2
Republican	Scott Smith	36,613	31.8
Total votes		115,315	100.0
