= Nimi McConigley =

American politician

Member of the Wyoming House of Representatives from the 59th district
- In office January 1995 – January 1997
- Preceded by: Dick Sadler
- Succeeded by: Nancy Berry

Personal details
- Born: Nirmala Swamidoss; 12 December 1939 (age 86) Madras, Madras Presidency, British India (present-day Chennai, Tamil Nadu, India)
- Party: Republican
- Spouse: Patrick McConigley
- Children: 2, including Nina
- Education: Queen Mary's College; Madras Law College; Columbia University

Nirmala McConigley (née Swamidoss; born 12 December 1939) is an Indian-born American politician and journalist. A Republican, McConigley served in the Wyoming House of Representatives from 1994 until 1996, where she represented the 59th House district. McConigley, who was born in Madras, was the first Indian-born person and the first Indian American woman to serve in any state legislature.

== Early life and education ==
Nirmala Swamidoss was born on 12 December 1939 in Madras (now Chennai), British India in a Tamil family. She did her schooling in Doveton Corrie School in Vepery. She went on to receive a bachelor's degree in Arts from Queen Mary's College and her law degree from the Madras Law College. During the premiership of Indira Gandhi, Nirmala worked in national news. She went on to study journalism at Columbia University in the 1960s.

== Career ==
After graduating from Columbia University, McConigley went into journalism. She and her family moved to Casper, Wyoming in the 1970s. She became one of only two Asian American news directors when she took that role at CBS affiliate KGWC.

=== Political career ===
McConigley served as the campaign manager for state senator Charles Scott, who was running for Governor of Wyoming in the 1994 election. She decided to run for represent the 59th House district in the Wyoming House of Representatives in 1994, where she was elected. McConigley stated that she received private criticism from colleagues after wearing a sari to speak at a high school in Cheyenne. During her tenure in the legislature, she sponsored legislation to make English the state's official language.

Rather than run for reelection, McConigley chose to run for United States Senate in the 1996 election. In a field of nine candidates in the Republican primary, she finished 4th, coming behind Michael Enzi, John Barrasso, and Curt Meier. She ran for the State House in 1998, but lost the general election to Nancy Berry.

== Personal life ==
She married Patrick McConigley and has two daughters, Lila and Nina. She met her husband, a geologist, while working at All India Radio in Madras. In an interview, she recalled choosing to move to Wyoming, initially intended to be temporary before her husband would move to Europe for work, because she was impressed by Jackson Hole. Her daughter Nina went on to become a writer, whose short story collection Cowboys and East Indians won the PEN Open Book Award in 2015.

== See also ==
- Asian American Journalists Association
- List of Indian Americans
