= List of special elections to the Wyoming Legislature =

Under Wyoming law, state legislative vacancies are not filled by special election, but rather by county commission appointments from a list provided by political party leadership. However, if a general or primary election in the state is voided, whether due to deliberate voter fraud or human error, a re-vote may be held no later than the third Tuesday after the disputed election.

== 1992 SD 23 Precinct 1-8 special election ==
The general election for Wyoming's 23rd Senate District in 1992 showed a close race between Republican candidate Larry Gilbertz and Democratic candidate Sandy Daly, with Gilbertz having a 29-vote lead. However, human error resulted in multiple voters in Precinct 1–8, a precinct split between two state senate districts, receiving ballots for the incorrect race. Due to the close margin, a special election in the precinct was called for November 24, with Democratic governor Mike Sullivan and Republican U.S. Representative Craig L. Thomas sending personal letters to all 222 registered voters in the precinct to request their support. The resulting special election reaffirmed Gilbertz's victory and expanded his margin to 68 votes. This race gave Republicans a veto-proof majority in the state senate.

Candidates	Precinct 1–8				Total
Candidates	General		Special		General		Special
Candidates	Vote	%	Vote	%	Vote	%	Vote	%
Larry Gilbertz	35	43.75	87	58.78	2,598	50.28	2,655	50.65
Sandy Daly	45	56.25	61	41.22	2,569	49.72	2,587	49.35
Total	80	100.00	148	100.00	5,167	100.00	5,242	100.00
Majority					+29	+0.56	+68	+1.30

== 2002 HD 36 special election ==
In the general election for Wyoming's 36th House District in 2002, Democrat Liz Gentile appeared to win the seat by the slimmest possible margin, one vote out of nearly three thousand cast. A recount expanded Gentile's margin to three votes, a tenth of a percentage point. The election was voided after it was found that thirteen voters from House Districts 56 and 57 may have voted in this race. The special election held on November 26 affirmed Gentile's victory.

Candidates	General				Special
Candidates	Initial count		Recount		Special
Candidates	Vote	%	Vote	%	Vote	%
Liz Gentile	1,461	50.02	1,466	50.05	1,168	58.02
Bob Tanner	1,460	49.98	1,463	49.95	845	41.98
Total	2,921	100.00	2,929	100.00	2,013	100.00
Majority	+1	+0.04	+3	+0.10	+323	+16.04

== 2008 HD 22 special election ==
In the general election for Wyoming's 22nd House District in 2008, a re-vote was called after it was discovered that 11 people had voted incorrectly in the district, much larger than disputed winner Jim Roscoe's 4-vote margin. In the resulting special election, Roscoe won once again, this time with a more convincing 119-vote majority.

Candidates	General		Special
Candidates	Vote	%	Vote	%
Jim Roscoe	2,891	49.96	2,849	50.99
Charles Stough	2,887	49.89	2,730	48.86
Write-ins	9	0.16	8	0.14
Total	5,787	100.00	5,587	100.00
Majority	+4	+0.07	+119	+2.13

== 2016 HD 18 Republican primary Precinct 4-5 special election ==
In the Republican primary election for Wyoming's 18th House District in 2016, some voters in Sweetwater County's Precinct 4-5 received the incorrect ballot. The election, held August 16, was voided on August 24, and the new election for Precinct 4-5 was scheduled for August 31.

Candidates	Precinct 4–5				Total
Candidates	General		Special		General		Special
Candidates	Vote	%	Vote	%	Vote	%	Vote	%
Thomas Crank	14	11.11	8	8.70	477	31.65	471	31.25
Scott Heiner	64	50.79	72	78.26	435	28.87	443	29.40
Lyle Williams	14	11.11	3	3.26	274	18.18	263	17.45
Zem Hopkins	7	5.56	4	4.35	162	10.75	159	10.55
Kevin Simpson	27	21.43	4	4.35	157	10.42	134	8.89
Write-ins	0	0.00	1	1.09	2	0.13	3	0.20
Total	126	100.00	92	100.00	1,507	100.00	1,473	100.00
Majority					+42	+2.78	+28	+1.85

== See also ==
- List of appointed members of the Wyoming Legislature
