= Senator Patton (disambiguation) =

John Patton Jr. (1850–1907) was a U.S. Senator from Michigan from 1894 to 1895. Senator Patton may also refer to:

- B. R. Patton (1920–1999), Louisiana State Senate
- E. Earl Patton (1927–2011), Georgia State Senate
- John Patton (Wyoming politician) (1930–2015), Wyoming State Senate
- Nat Patton (1881–1957), Texas State Senate
- Robert M. Patton (1809–1885), Alabama State Senate
- Tom Patton (born 1953), Ohio State Senate

== See also ==
- Bernard M. Patten, New York State Senate
