= Roy Edwards =

Roy Edwards may refer to:

- Roy Edwards (ice hockey)
- Roy Edwards (politician)
