= Mary Meyer Gilmore =

American politician

Member of the Wyoming House of Representatives from the 59th district
- In office 2003–2009
- Preceded by: Dick Sadler
- Succeeded by: Mike Gilmore

Personal details
- Born: November 20, 1947 (age 78) Casper, Wyoming, U.S.
- Party: Democratic
- Spouse: Michael

Mary Meyer Gilmore (born November 20, 1947) is a Democratic former member of the Wyoming House of Representatives, representing the 59th district from 2003 until 2009.
