= Diercks =

Diercks is a surname. Notable people with the surname include:

- Carsten Diercks (1921–2009), German documentary filmmaker
- Friedrich Diercks (1796–1848), German-born American settler
- Grete Diercks (1890–1978), German actress
- John Diercks (1927–2020), American composer
- Justin Diercks (born 1980), American stock car racing driver
- Ross Diercks (born 1957), American politician
