= Allen Slagle =

American politician

Member of the Wyoming House of Representatives from the 2nd district
- In office January 10, 2023 – January 2025
- Preceded by: J. D. Williams
- Succeeded by: J. D. Williams

Personal details
- Party: Republican
- Education: University of Wyoming
- Profession: Rancher

Allen Slagle is an American politician and a Republican former member of the Wyoming House of Representatives who represented the 2nd district from January 10, 2023 to January 2025.

== Political career ==
After incumbent Republican representative Hans Hunt resigned his seat to join the staff of U.S. Senator Cynthia Lummis, county commissioners within the 2nd district's boundaries appointed J. D. Williams to the seat. Slagle ran in the Republican primary on August 16, 2022, and defeated Williams by 12 votes, and then won the general election on November 8, 2022, unopposed.
