= Shelly Duncan =

American politician

Member of the Wyoming House of Representatives from the 5th district
- In office January 8, 2019 – January 10, 2023
- Preceded by: Cheri Steinmetz
- Succeeded by: Scott Smith

Personal details
- Born: Beaumont, Texas
- Party: Republican
- Spouse: Eric Duncan
- Children: 3
- Profession: Realtor, politician

Shelly Duncan is an American politician and a Republican former member of the Wyoming House of Representatives, representing District 5 from January 8, 2019, until January 10, 2023.

== Elections ==
=== 2018 ===
When incumbent Republican Representative Cheri Steinmetz retired to run for the State Senate seat held by Curt Meier, Duncan announced her candidacy. She won the Republican primary with 42.3% of the vote and defeated Democratic candidate Joan Brinkley with 76.7% of the vote in the general election.

=== 2020 ===
Duncan was unopposed in the August 18, 2020, Republican Primary, winning with 1,917 votes. She was also unopposed for the November 3, 2020, general election and won with 4,122 votes.
