= Art Washut =

American politician

Member of the Wyoming House of Representatives from the 36th district
- Incumbent
- Assumed office January 8, 2019
- Preceded by: Debbie Bovee

Personal details
- Party: Republican
- Education: Chadron State College; University of Wyoming

Art Washut is a Republican member of the Wyoming House of Representatives representing District 36 since January 8, 2019. Washut is a Roman Catholic.

== Elections ==
=== 2018 ===
Washut challenged incumbent Democratic Representative Debbie Bovee and ran unopposed in the Republican primary election. He defeated Bovee in the general election with 56% of the vote.
