= Thomas Lockhart =

American politician (1935–2018)

Member of the Wyoming House of Representatives from the 57th district
- In office January 9, 2001 – January 10, 2017
- Preceded by: Bob Tanner
- Succeeded by: Chuck Gray

Personal details
- Born: September 29, 1935 Casper, Wyoming, U.S.
- Died: February 19, 2018 (aged 82)
- Party: Republican
- Education: University of Wyoming; Portland State University

Thomas A. Lockhart (September 29, 1935 – February 19, 2018) was an American politician and a former Republican member of the Wyoming House of Representatives representing District 57.

== Education ==
Lockhart earned his BS in electrical engineering from the University of Wyoming and his MBA from Portland State University.

== Elections ==
- 2012 Lockhart was unopposed for both the August 21, 2012 Republican Primary, winning with 852 votes, and the November 6, 2012 General election with 2,866 votes.
- 2000 When Republican Representative Bob Tanner left the Legislature and left the District 57 seat open, Lockhart was unopposed for the August 22, 2000 Republican Primary, winning with 826 votes, and won the November 7, 2000 General election with 1,815 votes (55.0%) against Democratic nominee Linda Stoval.
- 2002 Lockhart won the August 20, 2002 Republican Primary with 846 votes (84.7%), and won the November 5, 2002 General election with 1,240 votes (54.2%) against Democratic nominee Dorothy Bullard.
- 2004 Lockhart was unopposed for the August 17, 2004 Republican Primary, winning with 885 votes, and won the three-way November 2, 2004 General election with 2,321 votes (54.6%) against Democratic nominee Margo Miller and Libertarian candidate Hubert Townsend.
- 2006 Lockhart was unopposed for the August 22, 2006 Republican Primary, winning with 720 votes, and won the November 7, 2006 General election with 1,996 votes (78.8%) against Libertarian candidate Timothy Delany, who had lost the Libertarian nomination to Townsend in 2004.
- 2008 Lockhart and Delany were both unopposed for their August 19, 2008 primaries, setting up a rematch, and joined by Democratic nominee Jane Ifland. Lockhart won the three-way November 4, 2008 General election with 2,130 votes (57.6%) against Ifland and Delany.
- 2010 Lockhart was unopposed for both the August 17, 2010 Republican Primary, winning with 909 votes, and the November 2, 2010 General election, winning with 1,891 votes.
