= J.R. Riggins =

American politician

Member of the Wyoming House of Representatives from the 59th district
- Incumbent
- Assumed office January 6, 2025
- Preceded by: Kevin O'Hearn

Personal details
- Born: 1959 or 1960 Kadoka, South Dakota
- Party: Republican

Justin Ray Riggins (born 1959 or 1960) is an American politician.

== Biography ==
J.R. Riggins was born either 1959 or 1960 in Kadoka, South Dakota. He graduated from Kadoka Highschool in 1978. In 1981, he married Leslie Ann Engel. Riggins has two children and five grandchildren.

Riggins works for Tallgrass Energy.

Riggins was elected as a Republican in 2024 to represent the 59th district in the Wyoming House of Representatives. He was a political newcomer who ran unopposed in both the primary and general election after incumbent Representative Kevin O'Hearn chose not to run for re-election. Riggins was appointed to the following committees: Minerals, Business and Economic Development as well as Revenue.

Soon after the beginning of his first session of the state House, a doctor's appointment on January 20, 2025, found a blockage in Riggins's heart which required triple bypass surgery. Riggins was absent from the legislature due to the surgery and it's recovery period. Riggins returned to the legislature on February 27.
