= How to Commit a Postcolonial Murder =

2026 novel by Nina McConigley

- 2026 book jacket
- Author: Nina McConigley
- Audio read by: Reena Dutt
- Subject: Postcolonialism, Abuse
- Genre: Literary fiction
- Set in: Wyoming, United States
- Publisher: Pantheon Books
- Publication date: January 20, 2026
- Publication place: United States
- Media type: Print, E-book, Audio
- Pages: 224
- ISBN: 9780593702246 9798217007035
- OCLC: 1482188541
- Website: Official website

How to Commit a Postcolonial Murder is a novel by American author Nina McConigley, published by Pantheon Books on January 20, 2026.

== Plot summary ==
In 1980s Wyoming, two sisters, Georgie age 12 and Agatha age 13, have to deal with growing up as children of Indian immigrants in a small rural American town. Their lives are changed when their uncle, Vinny, his wife and his son, move in from India. After Vinny brutally abuses them, the sisters decide he must die. They collaborate and plan to kill him by adding small amounts of antifreeze to his drinks. As the murder plot unfolds, Georgie continues her daily life such as attending summer camp or watching the Wedding of Prince Charles and Lady Diana Spencer (1981).

At the same time, she is dealing with the effects of her trauma, the damage done to her identity, and the heavy legacy of British colonialism. Following their uncle's death, Georgie and Agatha admit their involvement to the reader, but whoever has the most culpability remains unclear. Agatha attributes the root cause to British influence. McConigley utilizes directly addressing the reader in alternating chapters written in the second person. This narrative technique pulls the reader into the text more closely to the subsequent events that describe the sisters' experiences over several months.

However, the story is initially told through Georgie's first-person perspective that is noted for contrasting stylized writing with dark humor. Also, teen magazine-style quizzes are part of the narrative. For example, "Is He Bad for You?" and "Do You Have What It Takes to Kill?" which reflects Georgie's plot progressions during the story. The book narrates the experience of being of an ethnic minority in rural America, and the closeness that develops between the sisters as they protect themselves when the adults fail to do so.

== Reception ==
According to Ian MacAllen of the Chicago Review of Books, "... the book succeeds at capturing complex emotions. [The novel] will resonate strongly with a specific type of reader who wants to explore the intimacies of sisterhood, particularly through the lens of otherness. McConigley has captured a unique narrative experience and shared it with an equally unique voice.
