= Floyd Pease =

American politician

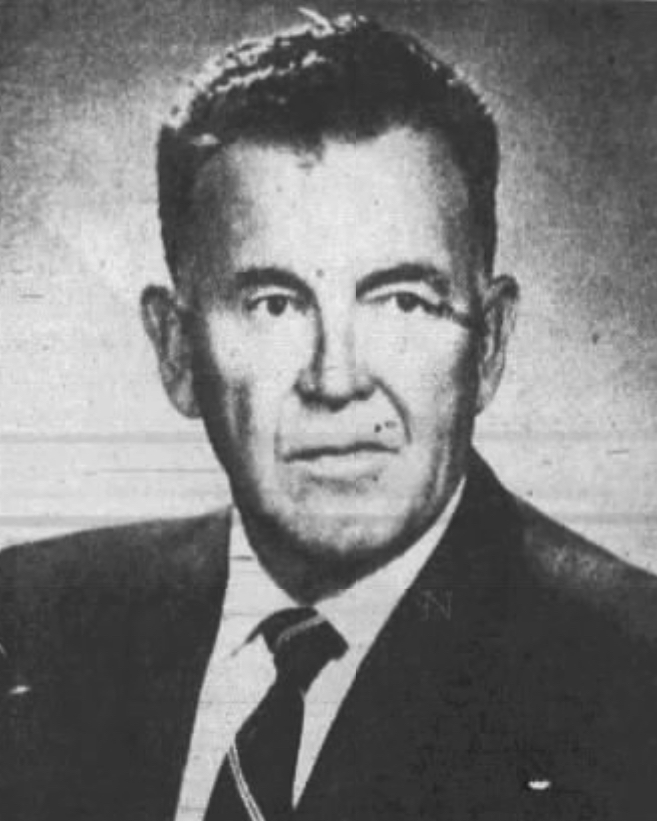
- Portrait, c. 1971

Member of the Wyoming House of Representatives from Goshen County
- In office January 9, 1967 – January 9, 1973
- Preceded by: Jack Van Mark
- Succeeded by: Don Scott

Personal details
- Born: Floyd Hugh Pease; June 27, 1898 Garfield, Nebraska, U.S.
- Died: November 11, 1983 (aged 85) Torrington, Wyoming, U.S.
- Party: Republican
- Spouse(s): Huldah Johnson (m. 1927; died 1958) Lois Rentz (m. 1973)
- Children: 2
- Education: Nebraska State Normal School at Kearney

Military service
- Branch/service: United States Army
- Battles/wars: World War I

Floyd Hugh Pease (June 27, 1898 – November 11, 1983) was an American schoolteacher, farmer, and politician who served in the Wyoming House of Representatives from 1967 to 1973. He was previously Goshen County treasurer for 24 years.

Pease was married twice: first to Huldah Johnson on June 3, 1927 and second to Lois Rentz Persson on April 14, 1973. He had two children by his first wife.
