= Myca Sturtevant =

American politician

Member of the Wyoming House of Representatives from the 29th district
- member-elect
- Assumed office January 4, 2027
- Preceded by: Ken Pendergraft

Personal details
- Party: Republican
- Website: Campaign website

Myca Sturtevant is an American politician. A member of the Republican Party, she is the member-elect of the Wyoming House of Representatives for the 29th district. She was elected in the 2026 election. She is a florist in Sheridan, Wyoming.
