= Wyoming's 57th House of Representatives district =

American legislative district

Wyoming's 57th State House of Representatives district
- Wyoming's 57th House of Representatives district as of 2022
Representative
Julie Jarvis; R–Casper
- Demographics: 79% White; 15% Hispanic; 1% Asian; 1% Other; 3% Multiracial
- Population (2022): 9,919

Wyoming's 57th House of Representatives district is one of 62 districts in the Wyoming House of Representatives. The district encompasses part of Natrona County. It is represented by Republican Representative Julie Jarvis of Casper.

In 1992, the state of Wyoming switched from electing state legislators by county to a district-based system.

== List of members representing the district ==
Representative	Party	Term	Note
Les Bowron	Republican	1993 – 1997	Elected in 1992. Re-elected in 1994.
Bob Tanner	Republican	1997 – 2001	Elected in 1996. Re-elected in 1998.
Thomas Lockhart	Republican	2001 – 2017	Elected in 2000. Re-elected in 2002. Re-elected in 2004. Re-elected in 2006. Re-elected in 2008. Re-elected in 2010. Re-elected in 2012. Re-elected in 2014.
Chuck Gray	Republican	2017 – 2023	Elected in 2016. Re-elected in 2018. Re-elected in 2020.
Jeanette Ward	Republican	2023 – 2025	Elected in 2022.
Julie Jarvis	Republican	2025 – present	Elected in 2024.

== Recent election results ==
=== 2014 ===
House district 57 general election
Party	Candidate	Votes	%
Republican	Thomas Lockhart (incumbent)	1,733	96.81%
Write-ins		57	3.18%
Total votes		1,790	100.0%
Invalid or blank votes		482	
Republican hold			

=== 2016 ===
House district 57 general election
Party	Candidate	Votes	%
Republican	Chuck Gray	2,261	63.99%
Democratic	Audrey M. Cotherman	1,252	35.43%
Write-ins		20	0.56%
Total votes		3,533	100.0%
Invalid or blank votes		202	
Republican hold			

=== 2018 ===
House district 57 general election
Party	Candidate	Votes	%
Republican	Chuck Gray (incumbent)	1,542	60.63%
Democratic	Jane Ifland	989	38.89%
Write-ins		12	0.47%
Total votes		2,543	100.0%
Invalid or blank votes		95	
Republican hold			

=== 2020 ===
House district 57 general election
Party	Candidate	Votes	%
Republican	Chuck Gray (incumbent)	2,504	68.88%
Democratic	Jane Ifland	1,120	30.81%
Write-ins		11	0.30%
Total votes		3,635	100.0%
Invalid or blank votes		186	
Republican hold			

=== 2022 ===
House district 57 general election
Party	Candidate	Votes	%
Republican	Jeanette Ward	1,323	69.63%
Democratic	Robert Johnson	563	29.63%
Write-ins		14	0.73%
Total votes		1,900	100.0%
Invalid or blank votes		86	
Republican hold			

=== 2024 ===
House district 57 general election
Party	Candidate	Votes	%
Republican	Julie Jarvis	2,405	92.32%
Write-ins		200	7.67%
Total votes		2,605	100.0%
Invalid or blank votes		624	
Republican hold			

== Historical district boundaries ==
Map	Description	Apportionment Plan	Notes
	Natrona County (part)	1992 Apportionment Plan	
	Natrona County (part)	2002 Apportionment Plan	
	Natrona County (part)	2012 Apportionment Plan	
