= Debbie Bovee =

American politician

Member of the Wyoming House of Representatives from the 36th district
- In office January 10, 2017 – January 8, 2019
- Preceded by: Gerald Gay
- Succeeded by: Art Washut

Personal details
- Born: February 26, 1954 (age 72) Laramie, Wyoming, U.S.
- Party: Democratic
- Spouse: Harold Bovee (deceased)
- Children: 2
- Profession: Teacher (retired)

Debbie Bovee (born February 26, 1954) is an American politician and a Democratic member of the Wyoming House of Representatives for District 36.

== Elections ==
=== 2016 ===
Incumbent Republican Representative Gerald Gay initially ran unopposed for a fourth consecutive term. However, Bovee ran as a write-in candidate during the Democratic primary, and received enough votes to qualify for the general election. Bovee defeated Gay with 53% of the vote.
