= Gerald Gay =

American politician (born 1956)

Member of the Wyoming House of Representatives from the 36th district
- In office January 11, 2011 – January 10, 2017
- Preceded by: Mary Hales
- Succeeded by: Debbie Bovee
- In office January 2005 – January 2007
- Preceded by: Liz Gentile
- Succeeded by: Liz Gentile
- In office January 2001 – January 2003
- Preceded by: Deborah Fleming
- Succeeded by: Liz Gentile

Personal details
- Born: July 22, 1956 (age 70) Casper, Wyoming, U.S.
- Party: Republican
- Education: Casper College; University of Wyoming

Gerald Gay (born July 22, 1956) is an American politician and a former Republican member of the Wyoming House of Representatives representing District 36. Gay previously served non-consecutively from 2001 until 2003 and from 2005 until 2007. He served three consecutive terms between 2011 and 2017. Based on an interview given to the organization Better Wyoming, Gay does not believe the gender wage gap exists.

== Early life ==
Gay was born in Casper, Wyoming. He earned his AS in physical science from Casper College and his BS in chemical engineering from the University of Wyoming.

== Elections ==
- 2012 Gay was unopposed for both the August 21, 2012 Republican Primary, winning with 734 votes, and the November 6, 2012 General election, winning with 2,802 votes.
- 2000 When Democratic Representative Deborah Fleming left the Legislature and left the District 36 seat open, Gay was unopposed for the August 22, 2000 Republican Primary, winning with 845 votes, and won the November 7, 2000 General election with 1,798 votes (51.8%) against Democratic nominee Liz Gentile.
- 2002 Gay was challenged in the August 20, 2002 Republican Primary and lost to former Representative Bob Tanner; Tanner lost the November 5, 2002 General election to Democratic nominee Liz Gentile by a single vote, following a recount.
- 2004 Gay and Representative Gentile were both unopposed for their August 17, 2004 primaries, setting up the rematch which had been averted by Gay's 2002 primary loss; Gay won the November 2, 2004 General election with 1,992 votes (52.2%) against Representative Gentile.
- 2006 Gay and Gentile were both unopposed for the August 22, 2006 primaries, setting up their third contest; Gay lost the November 7, 2006 General election to Gentile, who left the Legislature after the term.
- 2010 To challenge incumbent Democratic Representative Mary Hales, Gay won the August 17, 2010 Republican Primary with 742 votes (58.8%), and won the November 2, 2010 General election with 1,500 votes (56.8%) against Representative Hales.
