= Wyoming's 59th House of Representatives district =

American legislative district

Wyoming's 59th State House of Representatives district
- Wyoming's 59th House of Representatives district as of 2022
Representative
J.R. Riggins; R–Casper
- Demographics: 79% White; 1% Black; 13% Hispanic; 1% Other; 6% Multiracial
- Population (2022): 9,414

Wyoming's 59th House of Representatives district is one of 62 districts in the Wyoming House of Representatives. The district encompasses part of Natrona County. It is represented by Republican Representative J.R. Riggins of Casper.

In 1992, the state of Wyoming switched from electing state legislators by county to a district-based system.

== List of members representing the district ==
Representative	Party	Term	Note
Dick Sadler	Democratic	1993 – 1995	Elected in 1992.
Nimi McConigley	Republican	1995 – 1997	Elected in 1994.
Nancy Berry	Democratic	1997 – 1999	Elected in 1996. Re-elected in 1998. Resigned in 1999.
Dick Sadler	Democratic	1999 – 2003	Appointed 1999. Elected in 2000.
Mary Meyer Gilmore	Democratic	2003 – 2009	Elected in 2002. Re-elected in 2004. Re-elected in 2006.
Mike A. Gilmore	Democratic	2009 – 2011	Elected in 2008.
Bunky Loucks	Republican	2011 – 2020	Elected in 2010. Re-elected in 2012. Re-elected in 2014. Re-elected in 2016. Re-elected in 2018. Resigned in 2020.
Kevin O'Hearn	Republican	2020 – 2023	Appointed in 2020. Re-elected in 2020. Re-elected in 2022.
J.R. Riggins	Republican	2025 – present	Elected in 2024.

== Recent election results ==
=== 2014 ===
House district 59 general election
Party	Candidate	Votes	%
Republican	Bunky Loucks (incumbent)	1,325	63.30%
Democratic	Laurie Longtine	762	36.40%
Write-ins		6	0.28%
Total votes		2,093	100.0%
Invalid or blank votes		114	
Republican hold			

=== 2016 ===
House district 59 general election
Party	Candidate	Votes	%
Republican	Bunky Loucks (incumbent)	2,462	69.07%
Democratic	Laurie Longtine	1,082	30.35%
Write-ins		20	0.56%
Total votes		3,564	100.0%
Invalid or blank votes		182	
Republican hold			

=== 2018 ===
House district 59 general election
Party	Candidate	Votes	%
Republican	Bunky Loucks (incumbent)	1,700	66.64%
Democratic	Laurie L. Longtine	843	33.04%
Write-ins		8	0.31%
Total votes		2,551	100.0%
Invalid or blank votes		78	
Republican hold			

=== 2020 ===
House district 59 general election
Party	Candidate	Votes	%
Republican	Kevin O'Hearn (incumbent)	2,658	70.16%
Democratic	Mike A. Gilmore	1,104	29.14%
Write-ins		26	0.68%
Total votes		3,788	100.0%
Invalid or blank votes		146	
Republican hold			

=== 2022 ===
House district 59 general election
Party	Candidate	Votes	%
Republican	Kevin O'Hearn (incumbent)	1,767	95.66%
Write-ins		80	4.33%
Total votes		1,847	100.0%
Invalid or blank votes		454	
Republican hold			

=== 2024 ===
House district 59 general election
Party	Candidate	Votes	%
Republican	J.R. Riggins	2,740	96.78%
Write-ins		91	3.21%
Total votes		2,831	100.0%
Invalid or blank votes		794	
Republican hold			

== Historical district boundaries ==
Map	Description	Apportionment Plan	Notes
	Natrona County (part)	1992 Apportionment Plan	
	Natrona County (part)	2002 Apportionment Plan	
	Natrona County (part)	2012 Apportionment Plan	
