= Joe Speckner =

American politician

Member of the Wyoming House of Representatives from the 5th district
- member-elect
- Assumed office January 4, 2027
- Preceded by: Scott Smith

Personal details
- Party: Republican
- Website: Campaign website

Joe Speckner is an American politician. A member of the Republican Party, he is the member-elect of the Wyoming House of Representatives for the 5th district. He was elected at the 2026 election. He is a farmer.
