= Cheri Steinmetz =

American politician

Member of the Wyoming Senate from the 3rd district
- Incumbent
- Assumed office January 7, 2019
- Preceded by: Curt Meier

Member of the Wyoming House of Representatives from the 5th district
- In office January 5, 2015 – January 7, 2019
- Preceded by: Matt Teeters
- Succeeded by: Shelly Duncan

Personal details
- Born: Goshen County, Wyoming, U.S.
- Party: Republican
- Spouse: Corey Steinmetz
- Children: 1

Cheri E. Steinmetz is an American politician and a Republican member of the Wyoming Senate representing District 3 since January 7, 2019. She previously served in the Wyoming House of Representatives representing District 5 from 2015 to 2019.

== Wyoming Senate ==
=== 2014 ===
Steinmetz challenged incumbent Republican Representative Matt Teeters, who had previously served as House Majority Whip. Teeters co-authored Senate File 104 in 2013, which removed many constitutional powers provided to the Wyoming Superintendent of Public Instruction. This proved to be unpopular with constituents, and Steinmetz defeated Teeters in the Republican primary, 60% to 40%. She was then unopposed in the general election.

=== 2016 ===
Steinmetz ran unopposed in both the primary and general elections.

=== 2018 ===
When incumbent Republican Senator Curt Meier retired to run for State Treasurer, Steinmetz declared her candidacy for the State Senate. Steinmetz defeated Martin Gubbels in the Republican primary with 71.1% of the vote, and defeated Democratic candidate Marci Shaver with 79.6% of the vote.

=== Tenure ===
In February 2022, Steinmetz wrote a budget amendment to eliminate University of Wyoming Gender Studies program.

In 2025, Steinmetz sponsored a bill to assert "the policy of the state of Wyoming is that CO2 is a foundational nutrient necessary for all life on Earth, and that it shall not be designated or treated as a pollutant or contaminant." It was voted down in committee.
