= Campbell County High School (Wyoming) =

- CCHS, Campbell County
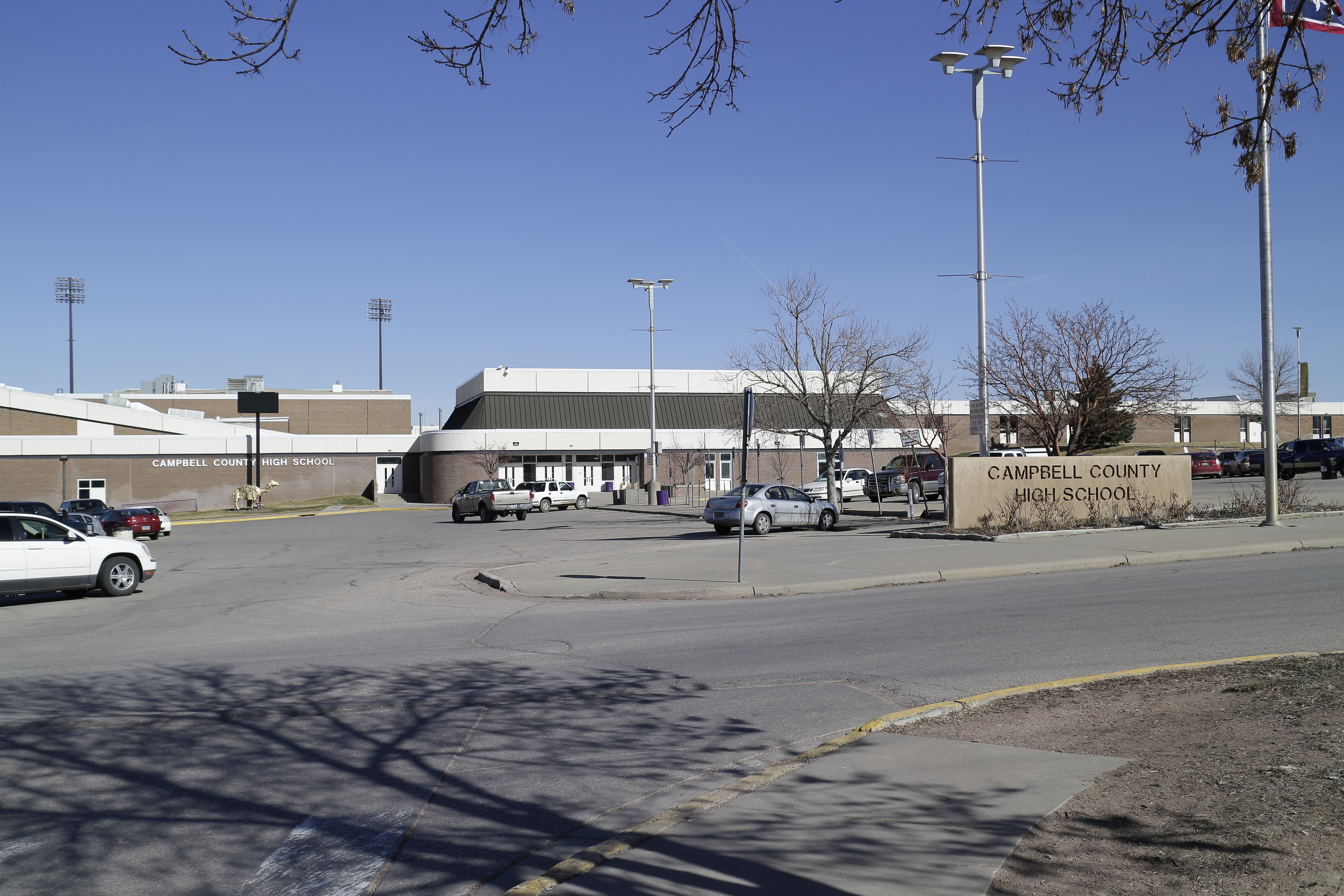

Location
- 1000 Camel Drive; Gillette, Wyoming 82716; United States; 44.2822°N 105.4880°W

Information
- Type: Public secondary
- School district: Campbell County School District #1
- Principal: Chad Bourgeois
- Teaching staff: 75.98 (FTE)
- Grades: 10, 11, 12
- Enrollment: 1,169 (2023–2024)
- Student to teacher ratio: 15.39
- Colors: Purple and gold
- Mascot: Camel
- Website: www-cchs.ccsd.k12.wy.us

Campbell County High School is a public secondary institution (grades 9–12) located in Gillette, Wyoming, United States.

== History ==
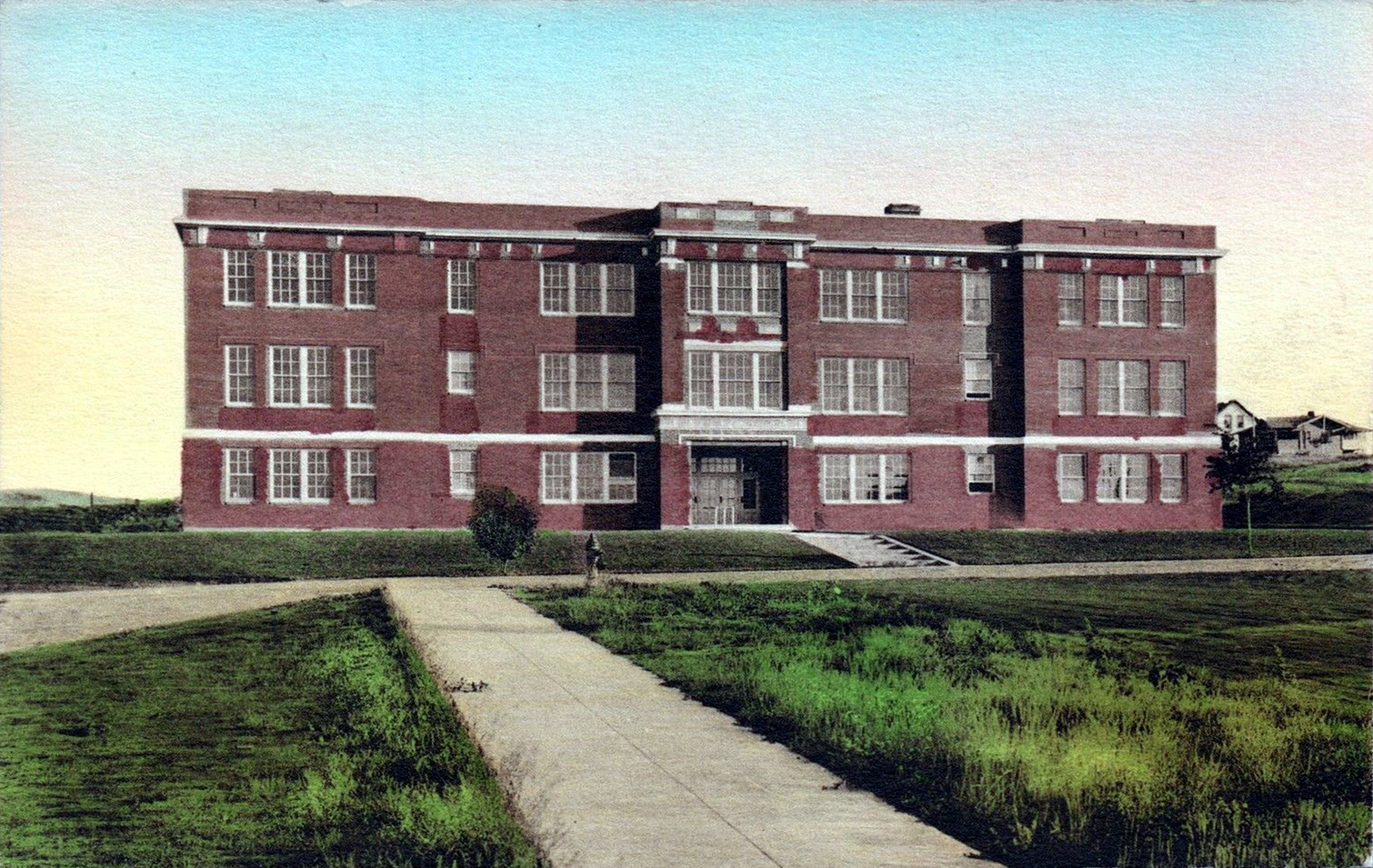
Photo postcard of Campbell County High School circa 1930s

On December 5, 1998, Cheryl Trover, a math teacher at Campbell County High School, kidnapped and tied up her children, shot her husband John Trover with a .22-caliber pistol, and stabbed him to death with a hunting knife. She had stolen the gun from her lover of four years, John Riley, the principal at the same school. She then set fire to her pickup truck and lied to police about who committed her planned crimes. Once police suspected her she killed herself with a .270 rifle at a friend's house. On December 9, 1998, principal John Riley resigned. He had worked at the high school for 15 years with 12 years as a principal. The events, including scenes in the high school, were dramatized in the crime story TV shows Redrum and Murderous Affairs.

== Notable alumni ==
- Ryun Williams, women's basketball head coach, Colorado State University
- Roy Edwards, member of the Wyoming House of Representatives (2015-2020)
