= Clarence Styvar =

American politician

Member of the Wyoming House of Representatives from the 12th district
- Incumbent
- Assumed office September 25, 2018
- Preceded by: Lars Lone

Personal details
- Party: Republican

Clarence Styvar is an American politician and a Republican member of the Wyoming House of Representatives representing District 12 since January 8, 2019.

== Elections ==
=== 2016 ===
When incumbent Republican Representative Harlan Edmonds retired, Styvar announced his candidacy. Styvar was defeated by Lars Lone in the Republican primary.

=== 2018 ===
When incumbent Republican Representative Lars Lone retired, Styvar announced his candidacy. Styvar defeated Connie Czarnecki in the Republican primary with 56% of the vote. After the primary, Lone announced his resignation after moving outside the district, and Laramie County Commissioners appointed Styvar to the seat, having won the primary. He defeated Democratic candidate Ryan Lindsey with 55.9%% of the vote.
