= Amy Edmonds =

American politician (born 1970)

Member of the Wyoming House of Representatives from the 12th district
- In office January 9, 2007 – January 8, 2013
- Preceded by: Layton Morgan
- Succeeded by: Lee Filer

Personal details
- Born: November 9, 1970 (age 55) Burke, South Dakota
- Party: Republican
- Spouse: Harlan Edmonds
- Education: University of Wyoming
- Profession: Lobbyist

Amy Edmonds (born November 9, 1970) is an American politician and a former Republican member of the Wyoming House of Representatives, having represented District 12 from January 9, 2007, until January 8, 2013. She is married to former Representative Harlan Edmonds.

She is a former Communications Director for Congresswoman Liz Cheney.
