= Layton Morgan =

American politician

Member of the Wyoming House of Representatives from the 12th district
- In office January 12, 1999 – January 9, 2007
- Preceded by: Leo Garcia
- Succeeded by: Amy Edmonds

Personal details
- Born: March 6, 1942 (age 84) Maywood, California
- Party: Democratic

Layton Morgan (born March 6, 1942) is an American politician who served in the Wyoming House of Representatives from the 12th district from 1999 to 2007.
