= Lars Lone =

American politician

Member of the Wyoming House of Representatives from the 12th district
- In office August 30, 2016 – August 27, 2018
- Preceded by: Harlan Edmonds
- Succeeded by: Clarence Styvar

Personal details
- Party: Republican
- Spouse: Dahlia Lone
- Education: Maine Maritime Academy

Lars Lone is an American politician and a Republican member of the Wyoming House of Representatives representing District 12 since August 30, 2016.

== Elections ==
=== 2016 ===
When incumbent Republican Representative Harlan Edmonds announced his retirement, Lone declared his candidacy. He defeated Clarence Styvar in the Republican primary. Edmonds then announced he would resign in order to move out of the district. Laramie County Commissioners appointed Lone to fill the remainder of Edmonds' term. He was sworn in August 30, 2016.

Lone faced former Democratic Representative Lee Filer in the general election and defeated Filer with 53.6% of the vote.

=== 2018 ===
Lone declined to run for reelection, and resigned early after having moved outside the district.
