= Nina McConigley =

American author (born 1975)

McConigley 2026 Texas Book Festival

Nina McConigley (born 1975) is an American fiction writer and playwright known for her focus on the American West, particularly the immigrant experience in rural settings. Her short story collection, Cowboys and East Indians, won the 2014 PEN/Open Book Award and the High Plains Book Award.

== Early life and education ==
Nina Swamidoss McConigley was born to an Irish father, Patrick McConigley, and an Indian mother and former Wyoming state legislator, Nimi McConigley, in Singapore. She was raised in Casper, Wyoming, after her family moved there when she was a baby. McConigley holds a BA in English from Saint Olaf College, an MA in English from the University of Wyoming, and an MFA in Creative Writing from the University of Houston.

== Writing career ==
McConigley's work centers on Wyoming and the American West, often exploring the rural immigrant experience. Her writing has been published in The New York Times, Orion, Ploughshares, Alaska Quarterly Review, High Country News, O, The Oprah Magazine, Parents, Virginia Quarterly Review, American Short Fiction, and The Asian American Literary Review.

Her quarterly column Township and Range for High Country News, launched in 2022, was a finalist for the National Magazine Award in 2024.

Her play adaptation of Cowboys and East Indians was commissioned by the Denver Center for the Performing Arts, with a world premiere set for 2026. She has two forthcoming books: How to Commit a Postcolonial Murder (Pantheon, 2026) and an essay collection with Crux: The Georgia Series in Literary Nonfiction (University of Georgia Press).

== Fellowships and awards ==
McConigley has received numerous awards and fellowships for her work, including:

- National Endowment for the Arts (NEA) Creative Writing Fellowship, 2022
- Walter Jackson Bate Fellowship at the Radcliffe Institute for Advanced Study, Harvard University, 2019-2020
- Humanities Research Group Fellowship, Wyoming Institute for Humanities Research, 2021–2022
- Theodore Morrison Fellowship in Fiction, Bread Loaf Writers' Conference, 2014
- Full Fellowship, Vermont Studio Center, 2008
- Barthelme Memorial Fellowship in Nonfiction, 2005
- Inprint Brown Foundation Fellowship, University of Houston, 2003

== Personal life ==
McConigley taught at the University of Wyoming for 13 years and now resides in Fort Collins, Colorado, where she teaches at Colorado State University and in the MFA Program for Writers at Warren Wilson College. She holds dual citizenship in the United States and Ireland.
