= Jeanette Ward =

American politician

Member of the Wyoming House of Representatives from the 57th district
- In office January 2, 2023 – January 6, 2025
- Preceded by: Chuck Gray
- Succeeded by: Julie Jarvis

Personal details
- Party: Republican
- Children: 2
- Education: Pennsylvania State University (BS); University of Nevada, Reno (MS); Northern Illinois University (MBA)

Jeanette Ward is an American politician formerly serving as a member of the Wyoming House of Representatives for the 57th district. Elected in November 2022, she assumed office on January 2, 2023. She left office January 6, 2025.

== Education ==
Ward earned a Bachelor of Science in environmental resources management from Pennsylvania State University, a Master of Science in environmental science and health from the University of Nevada, Reno, and a Master of Business Administration from Northern Illinois University.

== Career ==
From 1997 to 2021, Ward held various positions at DSM, including chemist, account manager, and regulatory affairs manager. Since 2006, Ward has also worked as a coula. In 2021, she became a fiber optic products manager at Covestro. Ward was elected to the board of the Elgin Area School District U46 in 2015 and lost re-election in 2019. She relocated with her family from Elgin, Illinois, to Casper, Wyoming, describing herself as a "political refugee" in a questionnaire. She was elected to the Wyoming House of Representatives in November 2022. Ward ran for re-election in 2024 but was defeated by Julie Jarvas in the Republican Primary.
