= Jack Van Mark =

American politician (1930–2020)

Member of the Wyoming House of Representatives from Goshen County
- In office January 10, 1961 – January 9, 1967
- Preceded by: Oscar Yoder
- Succeeded by: Floyd Pease

Personal details
- Born: Jack Bill Van Mark; July 4, 1930 Torrington, Wyoming, U.S.
- Died: December 23, 2020 (aged 90) Torrington, Wyoming, U.S.
- Party: Republican
- Spouse: Hanna June Benzel (m. 1955)
- Education: University of Wyoming (BS)
- Occupation: rancher
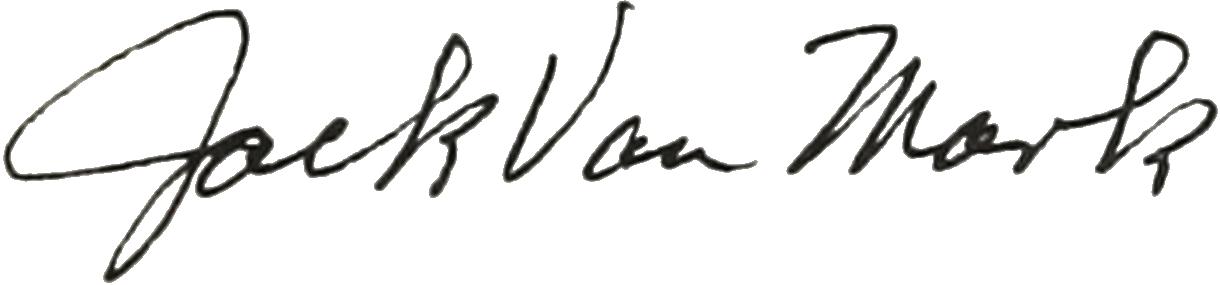
- Signature

Jack Bill Van Mark (July 4, 1930 – December 23, 2020) was an American politician in the state of Wyoming. He served in the Wyoming House of Representatives as a member of the Republican Party. He earned a Bachelor of Science degree from the University of Wyoming in geology.
