= Ken Pendergraft =

American politician

Member of the Wyoming House of Representatives from the 29th district
- Incumbent
- Assumed office January 3, 2023
- Preceded by: Mark Kinner
- Succeeded by: Myca Sturtevant (elect)

Personal details
- Born: Casper, Wyoming, U.S.
- Party: Republican
- Children: 3

Ken Pendergraft is an American Republican politician serving the 29th district in the Wyoming House of Representatives. He won the seat in the 2022 election on November 8, 2022, against Democrat Martha Wright. He assumed office on January 2, 2023. Pendergaft has worked as a contractor/homebuilder. He currently serves on two committees: the committee On Transportation, Highways & Military Affairs, and the Air Transportation Liaison Committee.
