= Chuck Gray (Wyoming politician) =

American politician (born 1990)

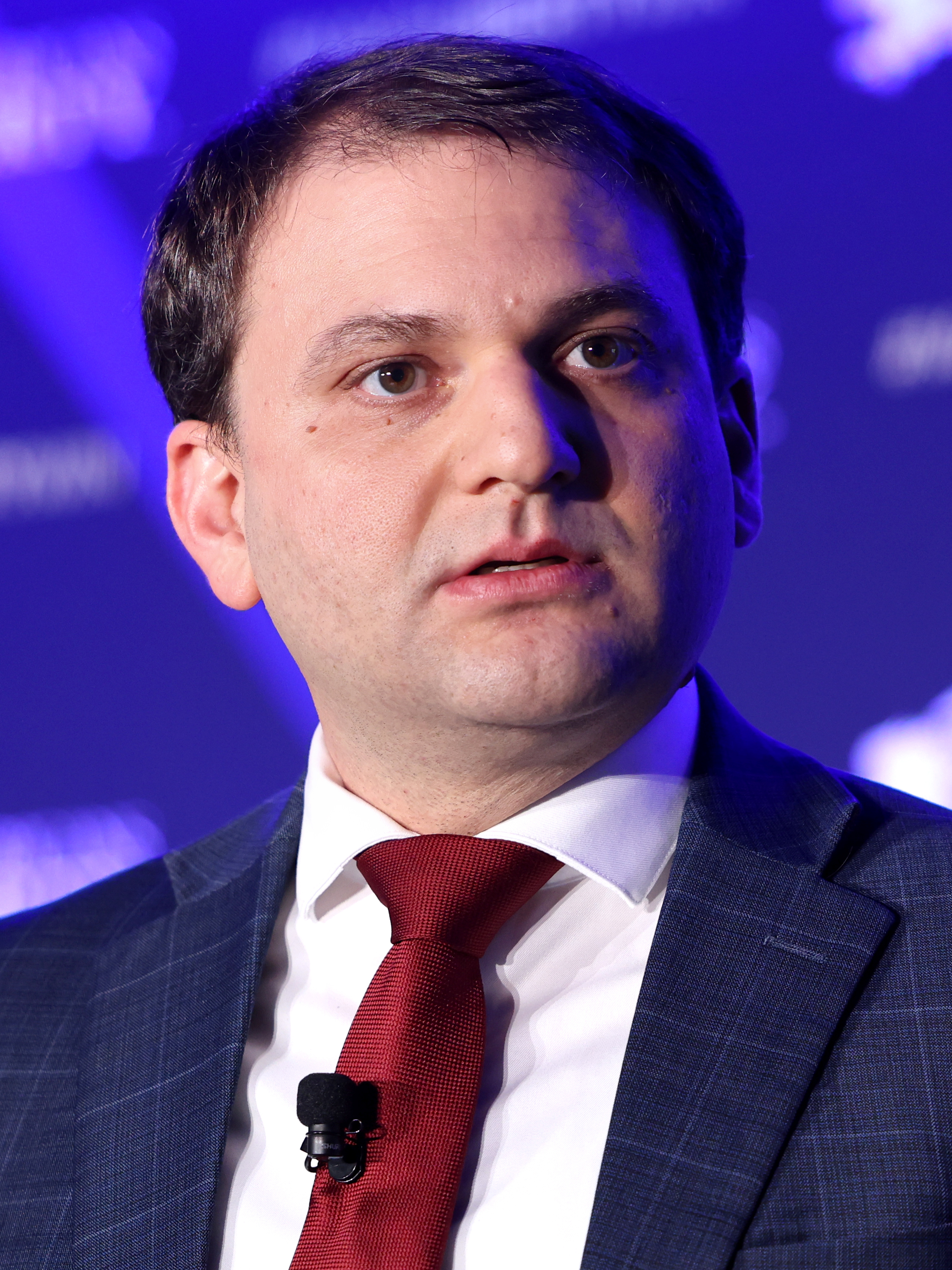
- Gray in 2025

Member-elect of the U.S. House of Representatives from Wyoming's at-large district
- Assuming office January 3, 2027
- Succeeding: Harriet Hageman

24th Secretary of State of Wyoming
- Incumbent
- Assumed office January 2, 2023
- Governor: Mark Gordon
- Preceded by: Karl Allred

Member of the Wyoming House of Representatives from the 57th district
- In office January 10, 2017 – January 2, 2023
- Preceded by: Thomas Lockhart
- Succeeded by: Jeanette Ward

Personal details
- Born: Charles Jan Gray; February 3, 1990 (age 36) La Crescenta-Montrose, California, U.S.
- Party: Republican
- Education: University of Pennsylvania (BS)
- Website: Campaign website

Charles Jan Gray (born February 3, 1990) is an American politician who is the United States representative-elect from Wyoming's at-large congressional district. He has served as the 24th Secretary of State of Wyoming since 2023. A member of the Republican Party, he previously served in the Wyoming House of Representatives from 2017 to 2023, representing the 57th district. After winning the Republican nomination in a contested primary, Gray defeated Democratic nominee Lisa Kinney in the general election. He is expected to take office on January 3, 2027, succeeding incumbent Representative Harriet Hageman.

== Early life and education ==
Gray is from La Crescenta, California, and grew up in the Los Angeles area. As a child, he spent summers in Casper, Wyoming, with his father, Jan Charles Gray, who owned Mount Rushmore Broadcasting.

Gray graduated from high school in 2008 and enrolled at the Wharton School of the University of Pennsylvania, graduating in 2012 with a Bachelor of Science in economics. During his time at Penn, Gray wrote a political column for The Daily Pennsylvanian. He subsequently moved to Wyoming full-time and began hosting a conservative talk radio program on KVOC-AM in Casper, a station owned by his father.

== Career ==
=== Wyoming House of Representatives (2017–2023) ===
Gray first ran for the Wyoming House in 2014 but was defeated in the Republican primary by incumbent Thomas Lockhart. He successfully won the seat in 2016 and was re-elected in 2018 and 2020.

While serving in the Legislature, Gray became a founding member of the Wyoming Freedom Caucus. After the caucus gained control of the Wyoming House in 2025, Gray appeared at a press conference announcing its legislative agenda and said he felt emotional seeing the organization in power because he had been a founding member. He endorsed the caucus's agenda and used the appearance to advocate for additional voter-registration requirements and a ban on ballot drop boxes.

During his first year in the Legislature, Gray supported legislation requiring physicians performing abortions to inform patients that they could view an ultrasound and hear a fetal heartbeat. Gray argued that the requirement would ensure that a patient's decision was informed. He subsequently supported legislation requiring physicians to report information about patients receiving abortions, including their race and marital status. Discussing abortion-related legislation in 2019, Gray said that the broader objective was to reduce the number of abortions performed in Wyoming.

Gray sponsored Wyoming's 2021 voter identification law, arguing that it was necessary to maintain confidence in the state's elections. The legislation advanced despite testimony from the Wyoming Secretary of State's office and county election clerks that voter fraud was not a problem in Wyoming. Gray later echoed disproven claims that the 2020 presidential election had been "rigged" and affected by widespread voter fraud. In 2021, he visited the site of the partisan Maricopa County election audit in Arizona and proposed giving the Wyoming Legislature authority to conduct election audits. The proposal was rejected by lawmakers.

Gray also promoted screenings of 2000 Mules, a film alleging widespread fraud in the 2020 presidential election. WyoFile reported that the film made no allegations concerning Wyoming's election and noted that former U.S. Attorney General William Barr had criticized the evidence presented in the film.

Gray served on the House Revenue, Judiciary, Agriculture and Management Audit committees.

=== 2022 congressional and Secretary of State campaigns ===
In 2021, Gray launched a Republican primary challenge against U.S. Representative Liz Cheney following her vote to impeach President Donald Trump after the January 6 United States Capitol attack. During the campaign, a political action committee supporting Gray received its entire $100,000 in funding from Gray's father, Jan Charles Gray, and spent more than $80,000 promoting his candidacy. Gray withdrew from the race after Trump endorsed Harriet Hageman and called on the other candidates to withdraw.

Gray subsequently ran for Wyoming Secretary of State in 2022. His campaign focused heavily on claims about election fraud and the security of elections. Gray maintained that the 2020 presidential election had been "clearly rigged" against Trump and advocated banning ballot drop boxes. His principal opponent, State Senator Tara Nethercott, rejected claims that the election had been stolen, saying there was no objective evidence supporting them. Gray received Trump's endorsement shortly before the primary and defeated Nethercott with 48.3% of the vote.

Days before the primary, Gray's campaign sent unsolicited text messages to Wyoming voters accusing Nethercott of being sued for "lying and slander", being investigated for campaign-finance violations, and voting to give herself a $30,000 taxpayer-funded raise. WyoFile investigated the three allegations and reported that all were false: Nethercott was not being sued, was not under a campaign-finance investigation, and the legislation she supported would have increased the salaries of Wyoming's five statewide elected officials rather than her own salary. Gray declined to answer WyoFile's questions about the accuracy of the messages, instead accusing Nethercott of distributing false information about him.

Gray ran unopposed in the general election and was elected Secretary of State.

=== 2026 congressional campaign ===
On December 29, 2025, Gray launched his campaign for Congress saying that he would "advance the Trump agenda" while pledging to lower costs for Wyoming families. He entered the race to succeed Harriet Hageman, who instead sought election to the United States Senate. Affordability subsequently became a prominent theme of Gray's campaign. In an August 2026 voter guide, Gray described "the affordability of daily life" as one of Wyoming's biggest challenges and said that lowering the cost of living was "very important", attributing higher costs to government regulation, federal debt and deficit spending, and declining real wages.

Affordability was also a prominent national political theme during the 2026 campaign cycle. Democratic congressional strategists encouraged candidates to campaign on an "affordability agenda", and the Democratic National Committee organized a nationwide series of events focused on affordability and the cost of living. President Donald Trump, whom Gray has strongly supported, had meanwhile dismissed concerns about affordability as a Democratic "hoax".

Gray entered the Republican primary with substantial support from politicians aligned with the Wyoming Freedom Caucus, which he had helped found. In April 2026, the Wyoming Republican Party amended its bylaws to establish a process for vetting and endorsing candidates in contested Republican primaries. In July, the party made its first primary endorsements, selecting Gray for the U.S. House along with several candidates associated with the Freedom Caucus. The endorsements were controversial because Wyoming law prohibited political parties from spending money directly or indirectly to help candidates secure their party's nomination. Republican Party chairman Brian Miller said the party would not spend money promoting its endorsed candidates, while the party challenged the restriction in federal court.

Shortly after the endorsements were announced, a super PAC funded by Gray's father began sending text messages to voters advertising the Wyoming Republican Party's endorsement of Gray. Other Republican candidates criticized the party's endorsement process. U.S. House candidate Kevin Christensen described it as a "purity test" that created the appearance of "pay-to-play", while gubernatorial candidate Eric Barlow declined to participate in the process and said that in a contested Republican primary "the voters should decide."

Despite Gray's emphasis on advancing Trump's agenda and Trump's endorsement of Gray during his 2022 Secretary of State campaign, Trump did not endorse a candidate in the 2026 Republican primary for Wyoming's U.S. House seat.

Gray won the nine-candidate Republican primary with 31,222 votes, or 25.4% of votes cast, becoming the Republican nominee for Wyoming's at-large congressional district. Steve Friess finished second with 25,054 votes (20.4%), followed by Kevin Christensen with 21,632 votes (17.6%). The same primary produced widespread losses for the Wyoming Freedom Caucus: numerous incumbent caucus members were defeated, threatening the group's majority in the state House, while caucus-aligned candidates also lost races for the state Senate and statewide offices.

On November 3, 2026, Gray defeated Democrat Lisa Kinney.

== Secretary of State of Wyoming ==
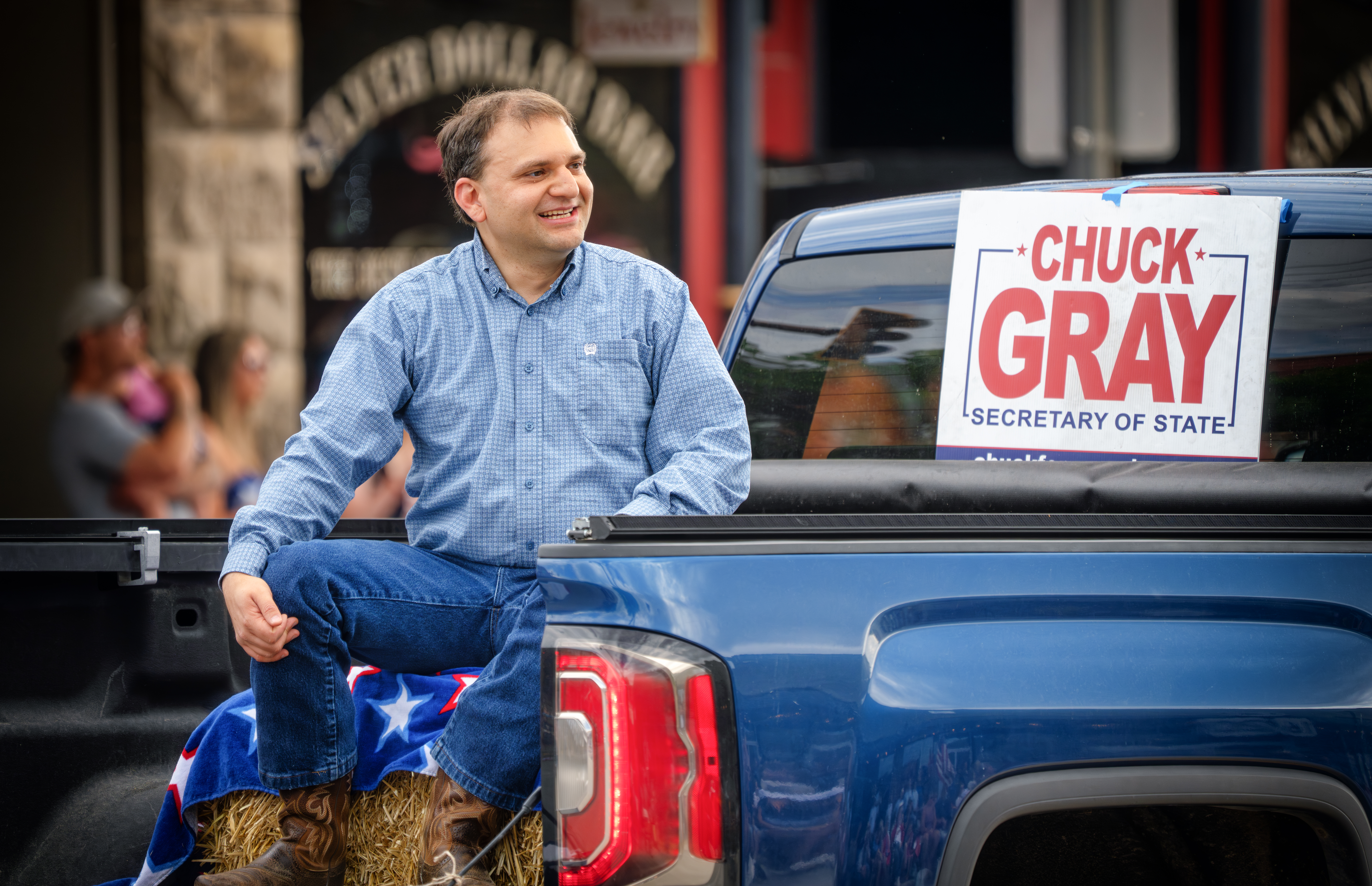
Gray in a 2025 parade in Cody, Wyoming

As Secretary of State, Gray made restrictions on voter registration and voting procedures a major focus of his administration. He sought to require prospective voters to provide documentary proof of Wyoming residency when registering to vote and advocated requiring voters to have resided in the state for at least 30 days before an election. Gray pursued some of the changes through administrative rulemaking. Governor Mark Gordon twice rejected election rules proposed by Gray, concluding that they exceeded the Secretary of State's statutory authority. In April 2024, Gordon rejected Gray's proposed proof-of-residency rules following recommendations from legislative staff and the Legislature's Management Council that the rules went beyond the authority granted to his office.

Gray also sought to end the use of unattended ballot drop boxes in Wyoming. In June 2024, he rescinded directives issued by his predecessor that had authorized their use and told county clerks that drop boxes should not be used in the 2024 election or thereafter, arguing that they were not a safe, secure or statutorily authorized method of absentee voting. Later that year, Gray thanked Park and Sheridan counties for discontinuing ballot drop boxes and said he would work with the Legislature to ban their use statewide.

In 2025, the Wyoming Legislature enacted requirements that voters provide proof of United States citizenship and Wyoming residency when registering and that voters be bona fide Wyoming residents for at least 30 days before an election. The law also authorized Gray's office to specify acceptable proof of residency. Under the resulting rules, registrants without a valid Wyoming driver's license may be required to provide identification, proof of citizenship and proof of residency; registration by mail additionally requires the application to be notarized for most voters. Gray's office also entered into an agreement with the U.S. Department of Homeland Security to use the federal Systematic Alien Verification for Entitlements (SAVE) system to check voter-registration information against federal immigration records.

The 2025 voter-registration requirements were challenged in federal court by the Equality State Policy Center, a Wyoming voting-rights and government-transparency organization. The lawsuit, Equality State Policy Center v. Gray, challenged the documentary proof-of-citizenship and residency requirements and argued that they imposed unconstitutional burdens on eligible voters. Governor Mark Gordon had allowed the legislation to become law without his signature, expressing legal concerns about the measure and warning that its residency provisions could disenfranchise lawful voters.

Gray defended the requirements and asked the federal court to dismiss the lawsuit, arguing that the plaintiffs had not demonstrated that the law would harm potential voters. The United States Department of Justice intervened in support of Wyoming's documentary proof-of-citizenship requirement, arguing that states have a legitimate interest in preventing voter fraud and verifying voter eligibility. In July 2025, U.S. District Judge Scott W. Skavdahl dismissed the lawsuit for lack of standing, concluding that the plaintiff had not established the injury necessary to bring the challenge; the dismissal therefore did not resolve the constitutionality of the voter-registration requirements on their merits.

Gray continued to advocate publicly for conservative political causes while serving as Secretary of State and appeared alongside members of the Wyoming Freedom Caucus in support of election legislation. During the 2025 legislative session, Gray championed the proof-of-citizenship and residency legislation that later became law and appeared at a Freedom Caucus press conference promoting the measure.

In addition to overseeing elections, the Secretary of State's office administers business registrations and securities regulation. Gray also serves on the State Loan and Investment Board, State Building Commission and Board of Land Commissioners.

=== Acting Governor of Wyoming ===
Wyoming has no lieutenant governor. Under Article IV, Section 6 of the Wyoming Constitution, the Secretary of State acts as governor whenever the governor is absent from the state.

== Awards ==
Gray received six consecutive awards from the Conservative Political Action Conference (CPAC) for his legislative voting record. He received the Platinum Award, the highest award given by Wyoming Right to Life, for his anti-abortion record. Gray also received the Club for Growth's Defender of Economic Freedom Award and a legislative award from Principles of Liberty for his voting record.

Political offices
Preceded by Karl Allred	Secretary of State of Wyoming; 2023–present	Incumbent
U.S. House of Representatives
Preceded by Harriet Hageman	Member of the U.S. House of Representatives from Wyoming's at-large congressional district Taking office 2027	Elect
