= Wyoming's 3rd State Senate district =

American legislative district

- Wyoming's 3rd State Senate district as of 2022
Senator
Cheri Steinmetz; R–Lingle
- Demographics: 84% White; 8% Hispanic; 2% Native American; 1% Hawaiian/Pacific Islander; 4% Multiracial
- Population (2022) • Voting age: 19,551; 18

Wyoming's 3rd State Senate district is one of 31 districts in the Wyoming Senate. The district encompasses Goshen and Niobrara counties, as well as part of Weston County. It is represented by Republican Senator Cheri Steinmetz.

In 1992, the state of Wyoming switched from electing state legislators by county to a district-based system.

== List of members representing the district ==
Representative	Party	Term	Note
Jim Geringer	Republican	1993 – 1995	Elected in 1992.
Curt Meier	Republican	January 1995 – January 8, 2019	Elected in 1994. Re-elected in 1998. Re-elected in 2002. Re-elected in 2006. Re-elected in 2010. Re-elected in 2014.
Cheri Steinmetz	Republican	January 7, 2019 – present	Elected in 2018. Re-elected in 2022.

== Recent election results ==
=== Federal and statewide results ===
Office	Year	District	Statewide
President	2016	Trump 80.19% – Clinton 13.76%	Donald; Trump
President	2012	Romney 75.62% – Obama 21.96%	Mitt; Romney
Senate	2012	Barrasso 82.52% – Chesnut 14.59%	John; Barrasso
Representative	2012	Lummis 76.29% – Henrichsen 16.70%	Cynthia; Lummis

=== 2006 ===
Senate District 3 general election
Party	Candidate	Votes	%
Republican	Curt Meier (incumbent)	3,609	58.05%
Democratic	Chris Shoults	2,608	41.95%
Total votes		6,217	100.0%
Republican hold			

=== 2010 ===
Senate District 3 general election
Party	Candidate	Votes	%
Republican	Curt Meier (incumbent)	5,496	100.0%
Total votes		5,496	100.0%
Republican hold			

=== 2014 ===
Senate District 3 general election
Party	Candidate	Votes	%
Republican	Curt Meier (incumbent)	5,743	100.0%
Total votes		5,743	100.0%
Republican hold			

=== 2018 ===
Republican Cheri Steinmetz was elected with 80% of the vote, compared to Democrat Marci Shaver, who received 20% of the vote.

Senate District 3 general election
Party	Candidate	Votes	%
Republican	Cheri Steinmetz	5,721	79.62%
Democratic	Marci Shaver	1,449	20.17%
Write-In	Write-ins	15	0.21%
Total votes		7,185	100.00%
Majority		4,272	59.45%
Invalid or blank votes		265	N/A
Republican hold			

== Historical district boundaries ==
Map	Description	Apportionment plan	Notes
	Goshen County (part); Platte County (part)	1992 Apportionment Plan	
	Goshen County (part); Platte County (part)	2002 Apportionment Plan	
	Niobrara County; Goshen County (part); Weston County (part)	2012 Apportionment Plan	
