= Nancy Berry =

American politician

Member of the Wyoming House of Representatives from the 59th district
- In office 1997 – November 1, 1999
- Preceded by: Nimi McConigley
- Succeeded by: Dick Sadler

Personal details
- Born: July 20, 1954 Casper, Wyoming
- Died: April 29, 2019 (aged 64) Casper, Wyoming
- Party: Democratic

Nancy Jane Berry (July 20, 1954 – April 29, 2019) was an American Democratic politician from Casper, Wyoming.

Berry was born in Casper on July 20, 1954.

She represented the 59th district in the Wyoming House of Representatives from 1997 to November 1, 1999, when she resigned due to family problems.

She in Casper on April 29, 2019.
