= Wyoming's 53rd House of Representatives district =

American legislative district

Wyoming's 53rd State House of Representatives district
- Wyoming's 53rd House of Representatives district as of 2022
Representative
Chris Knapp; R–Gillette
- Demographics: 87% White; 8% Hispanic; 1% Asian; 1% Native American; 4% Multiracial
- Population (2022): 8,806

Wyoming's 53rd House of Representatives district is one of 62 districts in the Wyoming House of Representatives. The district encompasses part of Campbell County. It is represented by Republican Representative Chris Knapp of Gillette.

In 1992, the state of Wyoming switched from electing state legislators by county to a district-based system.

== List of members representing the district ==
Representative	Party	Term	Note
Dick Erb	Republican	1992 – 1997	Elected in 1992. Re-elected in 1994.
Nick Deegan	Democratic	1997 – 2002	Elected in 1996. Re-elected in 1998. Re-elected in 2000. Resigned in 2002.
Don Warfield	Democratic	2002 – 2003	Appointed in 2002.
Frank W. Latta	Republican	2003 – 2005	Elected in 2002. Re-elected in 2004. Resigned in 2005.
Erin E. Mercer	Republican	2005 – 2009	Appointed in 2005. Re-elected in 2006. Re-elected in 2008. Resigned in 2009.
Gregg Blikre	Republican	2009 – 2015	Appointed in 2009. Re-elected in 2010. Re-elected in 2012.
Roy Edwards	Republican	2015 – 2020	Elected in 2014. Re-elected in 2016. Re-elected in 2018. Died in 2020. Re-elected in 2020. (Note: Edwards died a day before the 2020 election. His name was still on the ballot and he ran unopposed. He was re-elected posthumously.)
Chris Knapp	Republican	2020 – present	Appointed in 2020. Re-elected in 2022. Re-elected in 2024.

== Recent election results ==
=== 2014 ===
House district 53 general election
Party	Candidate	Votes	%
Republican	Roy Edwards	1,540	98.40%
Write-ins		25	1.59%
Total votes		1,565	100.0%
Invalid or blank votes		351	
Republican hold			

=== 2016 ===
House district 53 general election
Party	Candidate	Votes	%
Republican	Roy Edwards (incumbent)	2,437	98.34%
Write-ins		41	1.65%
Total votes		2,478	100.0%
Invalid or blank votes		598	
Republican hold			

=== 2018 ===
House district 53 general election
Party	Candidate	Votes	%
Republican	Roy Edwards (incumbent)	1,793	97.39%
Write-ins		48	2.60%
Total votes		1,841	100.0%
Invalid or blank votes		358	
Republican hold			

=== 2020 ===
House district 53 general election
Party	Candidate	Votes	%
Republican	Roy Edwards (incumbent)	2,303	95.16%
Write-ins		117	4.83%
Total votes		2,420	100.0%
Invalid or blank votes		791	
Republican hold			

=== 2022 ===
House district 53 general election
Party	Candidate	Votes	%
Republican	Chris Knapp (incumbent)	1,647	84.89%
Constitution	Larry Williamson	279	14.38%
Write-ins		14	0.72%
Total votes		1,940	100.0%
Invalid or blank votes		118	
Republican hold			

=== 2024 ===
House district 53 general election
Party	Candidate	Votes	%
Republican	Chris Knapp (incumbent)	2,466	97.93%
Write-ins		52	2.06%
Total votes		2,518	100.0%
Invalid or blank votes		463	
Republican hold			

== Historical district boundaries ==
Map	Description	Apportionment Plan	Notes
	Campbell County (part)	1992 Apportionment Plan	
	Campbell County (part)	2002 Apportionment Plan	
	Campbell County (part)	2012 Apportionment Plan	
