= Wyoming's 2nd House of Representatives district =

American legislative district

Wyoming's 2nd State House of Representatives district
- Wyoming's 2nd House of Representatives district as of 2022
Representative
| J. D. Williams; R–Lusk |
- Demographics: 86% White; 1% Black; 5% Hispanic; 2% Native American; 1% Hawaiian/Pacific Islander; 5% Multiracial
- Population (2022): 9,353

Wyoming's 2nd House of Representatives district is one of 62 districts in the Wyoming House of Representatives. The district encompasses Niobrara County as well as parts of Goshen and Weston counties. It is represented by Republican Representative J. D. Williams of Lusk.

In 1992, the state of Wyoming switched from electing state legislators by county to a district-based system.

== List of members representing the district ==
| Representative | Party | Term | Note |
|---|---|---|---|
| Ross Diercks | Democratic | 1993 – 2011 | Elected in 1992. Re-elected in 1994. Re-elected in 1996. Re-elected in 1998. Re-elected in 2000. Re-elected in 2002. Re-elected in 2004. Re-elected in 2006. Re-elected in 2008. |
| Hans Hunt | Republican | 2011 – 2021 | Elected in 2010. Re-elected in 2012. Re-elected in 2014. Re-elected in 2016. Re-elected in 2018. Re-elected in 2020. Resigned in 2021. |
| J. D. Williams | Republican | 2021 – 2022 | Appointed in 2021. |
| Allen Slagle | Republican | 2023 – 2025 | Elected in 2022. |
| J. D. Williams | Republican | 2025 – present | Elected in 2024. |

== Recent election results ==
=== 2014 ===
House district 2 general election
| Party | Candidate | Votes | % |
|---|---|---|---|
| Republican | Hans Hunt (Incumbent) | 2,985 | 99.00% |
| Write-ins | | 30 | 0.99% |
| Total votes | | 3,015 | 100.0% |
| Invalid or blank votes | | 413 | |
| Republican hold | | | |

=== 2016 ===
House district 2 general election
| Party | Candidate | Votes | % |
|---|---|---|---|
| Republican | Hans Hunt (Incumbent) | 3,863 | 85.84% |
| Democratic | Harold Eaton | 624 | 13.86% |
| Write-ins | | 13 | 0.28% |
| Total votes | | 4,500 | 100.0% |
| Invalid or blank votes | | 162 | |
| Republican hold | | | |

=== 2018 ===
House district 2 general election
| Party | Candidate | Votes | % |
|---|---|---|---|
| Republican | Hans Hunt (Incumbent) | 3,261 | 98.28% |
| Write-ins | | 57 | 1.71% |
| Total votes | | 3,318 | 100.0% |
| Invalid or blank votes | | 404 | |
| Republican hold | | | |

=== 2020 ===
House district 2 general election
| Party | Candidate | Votes | % |
|---|---|---|---|
| Republican | Hans Hunt (Incumbent) | 4,121 | 98.44% |
| Write-ins | | 65 | 1.55% |
| Total votes | | 4,186 | 100.0% |
| Invalid or blank votes | | 471 | |
| Republican hold | | | |

=== 2022 ===
House district 2 general election
| Party | Candidate | Votes | % |
|---|---|---|---|
| Republican | Allen Slagle | 2,927 | 85.31% |
| Write-ins | | 504 | 14.68% |
| Total votes | | 3,431 | 100.0% |
| Invalid or blank votes | | 371 | |
| Republican hold | | | |

=== 2024 ===
House district 2 general election
| Party | Candidate | Votes | % |
|---|---|---|---|
| Republican | J. D. Williams | 3,834 | 93.92% |
| Write-ins | | 248 | 6.07% |
| Total votes | | 4,082 | 100.0% |
| Invalid or blank votes | | 564 | |
| Republican hold | | | |

== Historical district boundaries ==
| Map | Description | Apportionment Plan | Notes |
|---|---|---|---|
| | Niobrara County; Converse County (part); Goshen County (part); Weston County (part) | 1992 Apportionment Plan | |
| | Niobrara County; Converse County (part); Goshen County (part); Weston County (part) | 2002 Apportionment Plan | |
| | Niobrara County; Goshen County (part); Weston County (part) | 2012 Apportionment Plan | |
