= Don Scott (footballer, born 1930) =

Australian rules footballer

Personal information
- Full name: Don Scott
- Born: 16 August 1930
- Died: 17 March 2002 (aged 71)
- Original team: Geelong West
- Height: 173 cm (5 ft 8 in)
- Weight: 68 kg (150 lb)

Playing career^{1}
Years	Club	Games (Goals)
1951–52	Geelong	12 (4)
- ^{1} Playing statistics correct to the end of 1952.

Don Scott (16 August 1930 – 17 March 2002) was an Australian rules footballer who played with Geelong in the Victorian Football League (VFL).
