= Cowboys and East Indians =

2013 short story collection by Nina McConigley

- First edition
- Author: Nina McConigley
- Language: English
- Genre: Fiction, short story collection
- Publisher: FiveChapters Books
- Publication date: 2013
- Publication place: United States

Cowboys and East Indians: Stories is a 2013 short story collection by Nina McConigley that was the winner of the 2014 PEN Open Book Award.

== Plot ==
Set in India and Wyoming, the stories in Cowboys and East Indians tell the immigrant experience in the American West. From Indian motel owners to a kleptomaniac foreign exchange student, to oil rig workers, to a cross-dressing cowboy, to an adopted cowgirl to a medical tourist in India.

== Critical reception ==
Several mainstream magazines and journals covered the book. A play, adapted by Matthew Spangler and Nina Mcconigley, premiered in 2026 at the Denver Centre for Performing Arts. The play is directed by Chris Coleman and stars a South Asian cast which includes Minita Gandhi, Shawn Jain, and Sadithi De Zilva.

== Awards ==
Year	Award	Category	Result	Ref
2014	High Plains Book Awards	Short Stories	Won	
2014	PEN Open Book Award	—	Won	
