= Sherri L. Wooldridge =

Wyoming politician

Member of the Wyoming House of Representatives from the 12th district
- In office 1993 – May 1995
- Preceded by: Constituency established
- Succeeded by: Leo Garcia

Sherri L. Wooldridge is an American Democratic politician from Cheyenne, Wyoming. She represented the 12th district in the Wyoming House of Representatives from 1993 to her resignation in 1995.
