= Bunky Loucks =

American politician

Member of the Wyoming House of Representatives from the 59th district
- In office January 11, 2011 – July 6, 2020
- Preceded by: Michael Gilmore
- Succeeded by: Kevin O'Hearn

Personal details
- Party: Republican
- Education: University of Wyoming

Carl "Bunky" R. Loucks is an American politician and former Wyoming state legislator. A member of the Republican Party, Loucks represented the 59th district in the Wyoming House of Representatives from January 11, 2011, to July 6, 2020.

== Education ==
Loucks attended the University of Wyoming.

== Elections ==
- 2012 Loucks and former Democratic Representative Gilmore were both unopposed for their August 21, 2012 primaries, setting up a rematch of their 2010 contest; Loucks won the November 6, 2012 General election with 1,885 votes (52.1%) against former Representative Gilmore.
- 2010 Challenging incumbent Democratic Representative Michael Gilmore for the District 59 seat, Loucks was unopposed for the August 17, 2010 Republican Primary, winning with 802 votes, and won the November 2, 2010 General election with 1,218 votes (53.7%) against Representative Gilmore.
