= James Hageman =

American politician (1930–2006)

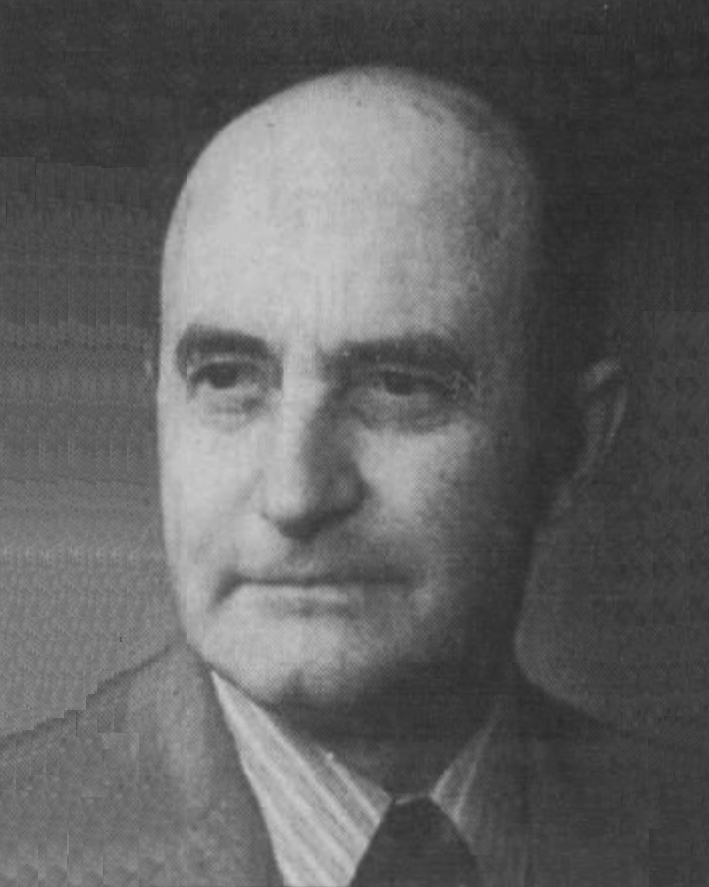

Member of the Wyoming House of Representatives
- In office January 11, 1983 – August 23, 2006
- Preceded by: Don Scott
- Succeeded by: Matt Teeters
- Constituency: Goshen County (1983–1993); 5th district (1993–2006)

Personal details
- Born: James Clay Hageman; March 2, 1930 Douglas, Wyoming, U.S.
- Died: August 23, 2006 (aged 76) Cheyenne, Wyoming, U.S.
- Political party: Republican
- Spouse: Marion Malvin (m. 1956)
- Children: 6, including Harriet
- Education: University of Wyoming

Military service
- Branch/service: United States Army

James Clay Hageman (March 2, 1930 – August 23, 2006) was an American politician, businessman, and rancher who served as a member of the Wyoming House of Representatives from 1983 until his death in 2006.

== Early life and education ==
Hageman was born in Douglas, Wyoming and graduated from Douglas High School in 1948. He attended the University of Wyoming for two years.

== Career ==
Hageman served in the United States Army, where he was stationed in Germany. After returning to Wyoming, Hageman founded a ranch in Fort Laramie, Wyoming. He served as a member of the Wyoming House of Representatives from his election in 1982 until his death in 2006. During his tenure, Hageman served as chair of the House Education Committee for 12 years.

== Personal life ==
Hageman married Marion Malvin on May 19, 1956. They had six children. His daughter, Harriet Hageman, is an attorney and politician who was elected in 2022 to serve as the U.S. representative for Wyoming's at-large congressional district.
