= Don Scott (Canadian football) =

Canadian football player (1927–2005)

Profile
- Position: End

Personal information
- Born: July 30, 1927; Windsor, Ontario, Canada
- Died: November 3, 2005 (aged 78); Toronto, Ontario, Canada
- Listed height: 6 ft 0 in (1.83 m)
- Listed weight: 168 lb (76 kg)

Career history
- 1949–1951: Toronto Argonauts

Awards and highlights
- Grey Cup champion (1950)

Donald Clayton Scott (July 30, 1927 – November 3, 2005) was a Canadian professional football player who played for the Toronto Argonauts. He won the Grey Cup with them in 1950. He previously played football at and attended the University of Western Ontario. After his football career he was president of the Ontario Insurance Commission and CEO of Ernst & Young in Canada. He died of cancer in 2005.
