= Donald Scott (cricketer) =

English cricketer

Personal information
- Full name: Donald Edward Scott
- Born: 5 June 1898; West Ham, Essex, England
- Died: 9 January 1981 (aged 82); Sturminster Newton, Dorset, England

Domestic team information
- Years: Team
- 1936: Somerset

Career statistics
Competition	FC
Matches	1
Runs scored	12
Batting average	12.00
100s/50s	0/0
Top score	11*
Catches/stumpings	0/–
- Source: CricketArchive, 22 December 2015

Donald Edward Scott, born at West Ham, east London, on 5 June 1898 and died at Sturminster Newton, Dorset on 9 January 1981, played one first-class cricket match for Somerset in the 1936 season.

Scott batted in Somerset's middle order in the one match that he played: the game against Sussex at Hove. He scored 1 in Somerset's first innings and then was left at 11 not out as Somerset collapsed from 43 for no wicket to 76 all out to lose the match by 258 runs.

His brief profile at www.cricketarchive.com does not record whether he batted right or left-handed. He did not bowl in his one first-class match.
