= Don Scott (Wyoming politician) =

American politician

Member of the Wyoming House of Representatives from Goshen County
- In office January 9, 1973 – January 11, 1983
- Preceded by: Floyd Pease
- Succeeded by: Jim Hageman

Personal details
- Born: Donald Brown Scott; May 12, 1923 Lingle, Wyoming, U.S.
- Died: October 13, 1990 (aged 67) Torrington, Wyoming, U.S.
- Party: Democratic
- Spouse: Lois Marie Wood (m. 1948)
- Children: 4
- Education: University of Wyoming

Military service
- Branch/service: United States Army
- Battles/wars: World War II

Donald Brown Scott (May 12, 1923 – October 13, 1990) was an American politician who served as a Democratic member of the Wyoming House of Representatives, representing Goshen County from 1973 to 1983. He was the House's minority leader from 1981 until his retirement. As of 2020, he was the last Democrat elected to represent Goshen in the state legislature.

Scott was married to the former Lois Marie Wood on June 20, 1948. They had 4 children.
