= Scott Smith (Wyoming politician) =

American politician

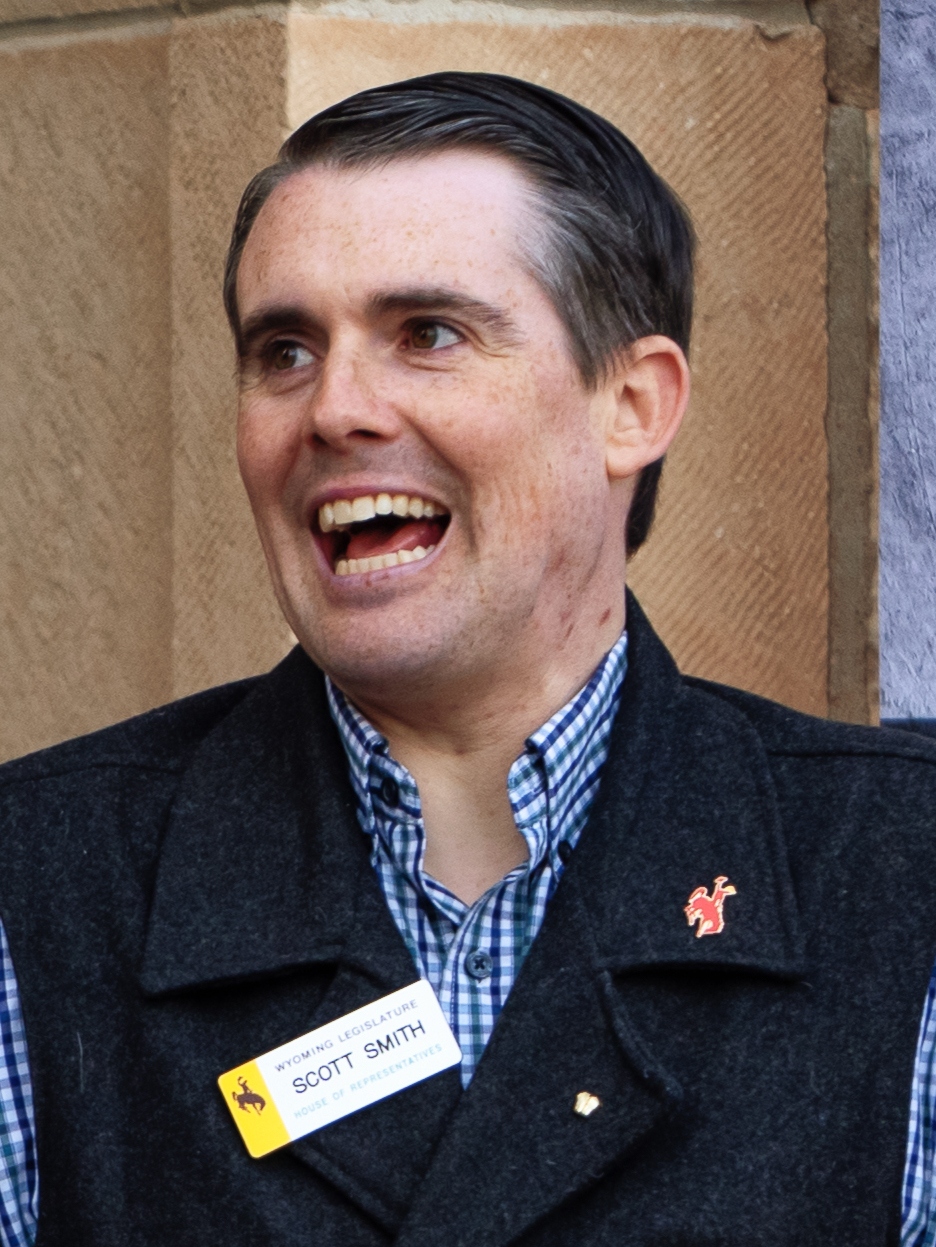

Member of the Wyoming House of Representatives from the 5th district
- Incumbent
- Assumed office January 10, 2023
- Preceded by: Shelly Duncan
- Succeeded by: Joe Speckner (elect)

Personal details
- Born: Fort Wayne, Indiana, U.S.
- Party: Republican
- Spouse: Charissa Smith
- Education: Spring Arbor University
- Profession: Businessman

Scott Smith is an American politician and a Republican member of the Wyoming House of Representatives representing the 5th district since January 10, 2023.

== Political career ==
=== 2025 ===
On January 14, 2025, the 68th Wyoming Legislature convened for the 40-day general session and Representative Smith was appointed to the Wyoming House Appropriations Committee and the Wyoming House Rules and Procedures Committee.

=== 2024 ===
On August 20, 2024, Smith defeated challenger Jackie Van Mark in the Republican primary election with 64% of the vote. On November 5, 2024, Smith was re-elected to a second term in the Wyoming House of Representatives with 93% of the vote.

=== 2023 ===
For the 67th Wyoming State Legislature that convened on January 10, 2023, Representative Smith was appointed to the House Transportation, Highways & Military Affairs Committee.

=== 2022 ===
Smith ran against incumbent Republican representative Shelly Duncan in the Republican primary on August 16, 2022, and defeated Duncan with 54% of the vote. He then won the general election on November 8, 2022, defeating independent candidate Todd Peterson with 58% of the vote.
