= Matt Teeters =

American politician

Member of the Wyoming House of Representatives from the 5th district
- In office September 18, 2006 – January 5, 2015
- Preceded by: Jim Hageman
- Succeeded by: Cheri Steinmetz

Personal details
- Born: February 22, 1983 (age 43)
- Party: Republican
- Spouse: Mandy Teeters
- Education: University of Wyoming (BS)

Matt Teeters (born February 22, 1983) is an American politician and a Republican member of the Wyoming House of Representatives representing District 5 since his appointment in 2006.

== Education ==
Teeters attended Lingle-Fort Laramie High School in Lingle, Wyoming. He earned his BS in political science from the University of Wyoming.

== Elections ==
- 2012 Teeters was unopposed for both the August 21, 2012 Republican Primary, winning with 1,472 votes, and the November 6, 2012 General election, winning with 3,790 votes.
- 2006 Teeters won the three-way August 22, 2006 Republican Primary with 909 votes (52.9%), and was unopposed for the November 7, 2006 General election, winning with 2,774 votes.
- 2008 Teeters was unopposed for the August 19, 2008 Republican Primary, winning with 1,172 votes, and won the November 4, 2008 General election, winning with 2,690 votes (69.8%) against Democratic nominee Russell Johnson.
- 2010 Teeters was unopposed for both the August 17, 2010 Republican Primary, winning with 1,794 votes, and the November 2, 2010 General election, winning with 2,778 votes.
