= Gregg Blikre =

American politician (born 1949)

Member of the Wyoming House of Representatives from the 53rd district
- In office September 1, 2009 – 2015
- Preceded by: Erin E. Mercer
- Succeeded by: Roy Edwards

Personal details
- Born: December 8, 1949 (age 76) Williston, North Dakota, U.S.
- Party: Republican
- Education: Minot State University

Gregg Blikre (born December 8, 1949) is an American politician and was a Republican member of the Wyoming House of Representatives representing District 53 who started on September 1, 2009, when he was appointed by the Campbell County Commission to fill the vacancy caused by the resignation of Representative Erin E. Mercer.

== Education ==
Blikre earned his BA from Minot State University.

== Elections ==
- 2012 Blikre was unopposed for both the August 21, 2012 Republican Primary, winning with 961 votes, and the November 6, 2012 General election, winning with 2,703 votes.
- 2010 Blikre won the August 17, 2010 Republican Primary with 953 votes (64.0%), and won the November 2, 2010 General election with 1,682 votes (82.7%) against Libertarian candidate John Wiltbank.
