= Bob Tanner (politician) =

American politician (1930–2024)

Member of the Wyoming House of Representatives from the 57th district
- In office 1997–2001
- Preceded by: Les Bowron
- Succeeded by: Thomas Lockhart

Personal details
- Born: September 5, 1930 Hot Springs, South Dakota, U.S.
- Died: October 30, 2024 (aged 94) Casper, Wyoming, U.S.
- Party: Republican

Robert Earl Tanner (September 5, 1930 – October 30, 2024) was an American politician from the state of Wyoming. He served as a Republican member of the Wyoming House of Representatives from 1997 to 2001.

== Life and career ==
Tanner was born in Hot Springs, South Dakota, on September 5, 1930, and moved to Wyoming at the age of six. He graduated from high school in Newcastle in 1948 and enlisted in the United States Marine Corps in 1951. He served three years in the Korean War and served twelve years in the Wyoming National Guard. He married Jane Hunter on July 2, 1956, and they had four children. Tanner was a teacher until 1969, having received bachelor's and master's degrees in education from the Black Hills Teachers College and the University of Wyoming, respectively. He then was a real estate agent for the remainder of his career.

He was elected as a Republican to the Wyoming House of Representatives in 1996 to represent the Casper-based 57th district and was re-elected in 1998. He lost election to the 36th district to Liz Gentile in 2002, first by a single vote, then by three votes in the recount, then by a wider margin in the special election held later that month after a new election was ordered. Tanner died in Casper on October 30, 2024, at the age of 94.

== Electoral history ==
=== 1996 ===
==== Primary election ====
Wyoming House of Representatives, District 57, 1996 primary election * denotes incumbent Source:
Party	Candidate	Votes	%
Republican	Bob Tanner	799	58.4
Republican	Michael Burke	569	41.6
Total votes		1,368	100

==== General election ====
Wyoming House of Representatives, District 57, 1996 general election * denotes incumbent Source:
Party	Candidate	Votes	%
Republican	Bob Tanner	1,792	53.0
Democratic	Sharon Long	1,546	47.0
Total votes		3,288	100

=== 1998 ===
==== Primary election ====
Wyoming House of Representatives, District 57, 1998 primary election * denotes incumbent Source:
Party	Candidate	Votes	%
Republican	Bob Tanner*	841	100.0
Total votes		841	100

==== General election ====
Wyoming House of Representatives, District 57, 1996 general election * denotes incumbent Source:
Party	Candidate	Votes	%
Republican	Bob Tanner*	1,460	59.4
Democratic	Steve Wilson	998	40.6
Total votes		2,458	100

=== 2002 ===
==== Primary election ====
Wyoming House of Representatives, District 36, 2002 primary election * denotes incumbent Source:
Party	Candidate	Votes	%
Republican	Bob Tanner	699	58.5
Republican	Gerald Gay*	495	41.5
Total votes		1,194	100

==== General election ====
Wyoming House of Representatives, District 36, 2002 general election (Note: Original count was 1,461–1,460 for Gentile, and a recount yielded a result of 1,466–1,463 for Gentile. The state canvassing board declared the result null and void, ordering a special election.) * denotes incumbent Source:
Party	Candidate	Votes	%
Democratic	Liz Gentile	1,466	50.1
Republican	Bob Tanner	1,463	49.9
Total votes		2,929	100

==== Special election ====
Wyoming House of Representatives, District 36, 2002 special election * denotes incumbent Source:
Party	Candidate	Votes	%
Democratic	Liz Gentile	1,168	58.0
Republican	Bob Tanner	845	42.0
Total votes		2,013	100
