= Chris Knapp (politician) =

American politician

Member of the Wyoming House of Representatives from the 53rd district
- Incumbent
- Assumed office December 4, 2020
- Preceded by: Roy Edwards

Personal details
- Party: Republican

Christopher Knapp is an American politician currently serving as a Republican member of the Wyoming House of Representatives.

== Career ==
Knapp is a business owner. Knapp served as a Campbell County commissioner from 2001 to 2012. In 2014, Knapp unsuccessfully ran in the Republican for the Wyoming House of Representatives seat representing the 53rd district, losing to Roy Edwards. On November 2, 2020, the day before the a general election in which Edwards ran unopposed, he died in office from complications related to COVID-19. On November 23, 2020, Knapp was unanimously appointed by the Campbell County commissioners to fill the vacancy left by Edwards' death. He was sworn into this position on December 4, 2020.
