= Mark Kinner =

American politician (born 1952)

Member of the Wyoming House of Representatives from the 29th district
- In office May 18, 2015 – January 2023
- Preceded by: John Patton
- Succeeded by: Ken Pendergraft

Personal details
- Born: July 23, 1952 (age 74) Danbury, Connecticut, U.S.
- Party: Republican
- Spouse: Tibbie J. Kinner
- Children: 2
- Education: University of Wyoming
- Profession: Banker

Mark Kinner (born 23 July 1952) is an American politician who served as Republican member of the Wyoming House of Representatives representing District 29 from May 18, 2015 to January 2023. He was appointed to the seat after incumbent Representative John Patton died.

== Elections ==
=== 2015 ===
Kinner was selected by the Sheridan County Commission to represent the 29th district after incumbent Republican Representative John Patton died. He took office May 18, 2015.

=== 2016 ===
Kinner faced Steven Cain in the Republican primary and defeated Cain with 64% of the vote. He then faced Democrat Sandra Kingsley in the general election, and defeated Kingsley with 77.6% of the vote.

=== 2022 ===
Kinner did not run for re-election in 2022.
