= J. D. Williams (Wyoming politician) =

American politician

Member of the Wyoming House of Representatives from the 2nd district
- Incumbent
- Assumed office January 2025
- Preceded by: Allen Slagle
- In office October 22, 2021 – January 10, 2023
- Preceded by: Hans Hunt
- Succeeded by: Allen Slagle

Personal details
- Born: Scottsbluff, Nebraska, U.S.
- Party: Republican
- Education: University of Wyoming

J. D. Williams is an American politician and rancher who has served as a member of the Wyoming House of Representatives from the 2nd district since January 2025. He previously served in the position from October 22, 2021 to January 10, 2023.

== Early life and education ==
Williams was born in Scottsbluff, Nebraska. He attended the University of Wyoming and received a Bachelors of Agricultural Economics.

== Career ==
Williams was appointed to the Wyoming House of Representatives in October 2021 after incumbent Hans Hunt resigned. Williams was defeated in the 2022 Wyoming Republican Primary by Allen Slagle. In 2024, Williams was again elected to the state House. He also works as a rancher.
