= Wyoming's 12th House of Representatives district =

American legislative district

Wyoming's 12th State House of Representatives district
- Wyoming's 12th House of Representatives district as of 2022
Representative
Clarence Styvar; R–Cheyenne
- Demographics: 65% White; 1% Black; 28% Hispanic; 1% Native American; 1% Other; 3% Multiracial
- Population (2022): 8,916

Wyoming's 12th House of Representatives district is one of 62 districts in the Wyoming House of Representatives. The district encompasses part of Laramie County. It is represented by Republican Representative Clarence Styvar of Cheyenne.

In 1992, the state of Wyoming switched from electing state legislators by county to a district-based system.

== List of members representing the district ==
Representative	Party	Term	Note
Sherri L. Wooldridge	Democratic	1993 – 1995	Elected in 1992. Re-elected in 1994. Resigned in 1995.
Leo Garcia	Democratic	1995 – 1999	Appointed in 1995. Re-elected in 1996.
Layton Morgan	Democratic	1999 – 2007	Elected in 1998. Re-elected in 2000. Re-elected in 2002. Re-elected in 2004.
Amy Edmonds	Republican	2007 – 2013	Elected in 2006. Re-elected in 2008. Re-elected in 2010.
Lee Filer	Democratic	2013 – 2015	Elected in 2012.
Harlan Edmonds	Republican	2015 – 2016	Elected in 2014. Resigned in 2016.
Lars Lone	Republican	2016 – 2018	Appointed in 2016. Re-elected in 2016. Resigned in 2018.
Clarence Styvar	Republican	2018 – present	Appointed in 2018. Re-elected in 2018. Re-elected in 2020. Re-elected in 2022. Re-elected in 2024.

== Recent election results ==
=== 2014 ===
House district 12 general election
Party	Candidate	Votes	%
Republican	Harlan Edmonds	930	52.45%
Democratic	Lee Filer (Incumbent)	839	47.32%
Write-ins		4	0.22%
Total votes		1,773	100.0%
Invalid or blank votes		61	
Republican gain from Democratic			

=== 2016 ===
House district 12 general election
Party	Candidate	Votes	%
Republican	Lars Lone (Incumbent)	1,756	53.42%
Democratic	Lee Filer	1,519	46.21%
Write-ins		12	0.36%
Total votes		3,287	100.0%
Invalid or blank votes		192	
Republican hold			

=== 2018 ===
House district 12 general election
Party	Candidate	Votes	%
Republican	Clarence Styvar (Incumbent)	1,359	55.94%
Democratic	Ryan Lindsey	1,063	43.76%
Write-ins		7	0.28%
Total votes		2,429	100.0%
Invalid or blank votes		76	
Republican hold			

=== 2020 ===
House district 12 general election
Party	Candidate	Votes	%
Republican	Clarence Styvar (Incumbent)	2,327	61.18%
Democratic	Lee Filer	1,463	38.46%
Write-ins		13	0.34%
Total votes		3,803	100.0%
Invalid or blank votes		79	
Republican hold			

=== 2022 ===
House district 12 general election
Party	Candidate	Votes	%
Republican	Clarence Styvar (Incumbent)	1,377	96.09%
Write-ins		56	3.90%
Total votes		1,433	100.0%
Invalid or blank votes		299	
Republican hold			

=== 2024 ===
House district 12 general election
Party	Candidate	Votes	%
Republican	Clarence Styvar (Incumbent)	2,252	94.18%
Write-ins		139	5.81%
Total votes		2,391	100.0%
Invalid or blank votes		311	
Republican hold			

== Historical district boundaries ==
Map	Description	Apportionment Plan	Notes
	Laramie County (part)	1992 Apportionment Plan	
	Laramie County (part)	2002 Apportionment Plan	
	Laramie County (part)	2012 Apportionment Plan	
