= Kevin O'Hearn =

American politician

Member of the Wyoming House of Representatives from the 59th district
- In office July 30, 2020 – January 2025
- Preceded by: Bunky Loucks
- Succeeded by: J.R. Riggins

Personal details
- Born: c. 1963 (age 62–63)
- Party: Republican
- Education: Montana State University; Excelsior University; University of Wyoming

Military service
- Allegiance: United States
- Branch/service: United States Army
- Years of service: 1980-2012
- Rank: Lieutenant Colonel
- Battles/wars: Iraq War

Kevin O'Hearn (born c. 1963) is a Wyoming politician.

== Early life and education ==
O'Hearn was born around 1963. In 1980, O'Hearn joined the Army National Guard. To advance as a commissioned officer, O'Hearn earned a bachelor's degree in science while studying at Montana State University, Excelsior University, and the University of Wyoming Extension. O'Hearn served two tours in the Iraq War. In 2012, O'Hearn retired from the Army National Guard with the rank of lieutenant colonel.

== Career ==
O'Hearn has owned a small construction and remodeling business for over 30 years. O'Hearn got involved with local politics in Mills, Wyoming, and served as the town's building inspector and assistant town planner. On July 15, 2020, three candidates were a nominated by the Natrona County Commission to fill the vacancy in Wyoming House of Representatives' 59th district left by Bunky Loucks: O'Hearn, Leah Juarez, and David Carpenter. On July 28, 2020, O'Hearn was appointed by the county commission. Many commissioners found the appointment difficult, with each candidate being similarly qualified, but the commission ultimately selected O'Hearn over the two other candidates due to his experience in local government. O'Hearn was sworn in and took office on July 30, 2020.

In the 2020 Republican primary for the 59th district, O'Hearn faced challengers Carpenter and Juarez again. Juarez and O'Hearn shared much of the same conservative political views. On August 18, 2020, O'Hearn won the primary with 45% of the vote. On November 3, 2020, O'Hearn won the general election against Democratic nominee and former state representative, Mike Gilmore.

O'Hearn did not run for re-election in 2024.

== Personal life ==
O'Hearn is married and has six children. O'Hearn is Catholic.
