= Wyoming's 29th House of Representatives district =

American legislative district

Wyoming's 29th State House of Representatives district
- Wyoming's 29th House of Representatives district as of 2022
Representative
Ken Pendergraft; R–Sheridan
- Demographics: 84% White; 1% Black; 8% Hispanic; 3% Asian; 1% Native American; 4% Multiracial
- Population (2022): 10,418

Wyoming's 29th House of Representatives district is one of 62 districts in the Wyoming House of Representatives. The district encompasses part of Sheridan County, Wyoming, United States. It is represented by Republican Representative Ken Pendergraft of Sheridan.

In 1992, the U.S. state of Wyoming switched from electing state legislators by county to a district-based system.

== List of members representing the district ==
Representative	Party	Term	Note
Rick Badgett	Republican	1993 – 2001	Elected in 1992. Re-elected in 1994. Re-elected in 1996. Re-elected in 1998.
Jerry Iekel	Republican	2001 – 2009	Elected in 2000. Re-elected in 2002. Re-elected in 2004. Re-elected in 2006.
John Patton	Republican	2009 – 2015	Elected in 2008. Re-elected in 2010. Re-elected in 2012. Re-elected in 2014. Died in 2015.
Mark Kinner	Republican	2015 – 2023	Appointed in 2015. Re-elected in 2016. Re-elected in 2018. Re-elected in 2020.
Ken Pendergraft	Republican	2023 – present	Elected in 2022. Re-elected in 2024.
Myca Sturtevant	Republican	2027 – member-elect	Elected in 2026.

== Recent election results ==
=== 2014 ===
House district 29 general election
Party	Candidate	Votes	%
Republican	John Patton (Incumbent)	2,012	92.76%
Write-ins		157	7.23%
Total votes		2,169	100.0%
Invalid or blank votes		449	
Republican hold			

=== 2016 ===
House district 29 general election
Party	Candidate	Votes	%
Republican	Mark Kinner (Incumbent)	3,073	77.32%
Democratic	Sandra S. Kingsley	888	22.34%
Write-ins		13	0.32%
Total votes		3,974	100.0%
Invalid or blank votes		134	
Republican hold			

=== 2018 ===
House district 29 general election
Party	Candidate	Votes	%
Republican	Mark Kinner (Incumbent)	2,550	98.34%
Write-ins		43	1.65%
Total votes		2,593	100.0%
Invalid or blank votes		530	
Republican hold			

=== 2020 ===
House district 29 general election
Party	Candidate	Votes	%
Republican	Mark Kinner (Incumbent)	3,766	97.43%
Write-ins		99	2.56%
Total votes		3,865	100.0%
Invalid or blank votes		639	
Republican hold			

=== 2022 ===
House district 29 general election
Party	Candidate	Votes	%
Republican	Ken Pendergraft	2,102	64.71%
Democratic	Martha J. Wright	1,134	34.91%
Write-ins		12	0.36%
Total votes		3,248	100.0%
Invalid or blank votes		90	
Republican hold			

=== 2024 ===
House district 29 general election
Party	Candidate	Votes	%
Republican	Ken Pendergraft (Incumbent)	3,009	69.06%
Democratic	Martha J. Wright	1,325	30.41%
Write-ins		23	0.52%
Total votes		4,357	100.0%
Invalid or blank votes		216	
Republican hold			

== Historical district boundaries ==
Map	Description	Apportionment Plan	Notes
	Sheridan County (part)	1992 Apportionment Plan	
	Sheridan County (part)	2002 Apportionment Plan	
	Sheridan County (part)	2012 Apportionment Plan	
