= Ross Diercks =

American politician

Member of the Wyoming House of Representatives from the 2nd district
- In office 1993 - January 11, 2011
- Preceded by: Constituency established
- Succeeded by: Hans Hunt

Personal details
- Born: May 3, 1957 (age 69) Worland, Wyoming, U.S.
- Party: Democratic
- Spouse: Rebecca
- Profession: Educator

Ross Diercks (born May 3, 1957) was a Democratic member of the Wyoming House of Representatives, representing the 2nd district from 1993 to 2011.
