= Lee Filer =

American politician

Member of the Wyoming House of Representatives from the 44th district
- Incumbent
- Assumed office January 14, 2025
- Preceded by: Tamara Trujillo

Member of the Wyoming House of Representatives from the 12th district
- In office January 8, 2013 – January 5, 2015
- Preceded by: Amy Edmonds
- Succeeded by: Harlan Edmonds

Personal details
- Born: Lee R. Filer; January 14, 1980 (age 46) Cheyenne, Wyoming, U.S.
- Party: Republican (since 2024), Democratic until 2024.

Lee R. Filer (born January 14, 1980, in Cheyenne, Wyoming) is an American politician and former Democratic member of the Wyoming House of Representatives. He is currently representing District 44. He was a former representative representing District 12.

== Career ==
Filer attended the Community College of the Air Force.

In 2024 he joined the Republican Party.

== Elections ==
- 2012 When Republican Representative Amy Edmonds retired and left the District 12 seat open, Filer was unopposed for the August 21, 2012 Democratic Primary, winning with 384 votes, and won the November 6, 2012 General election with 1,578 votes (48.00%) against Republican candidate David Kniseley.
