= Mary Hales =

American politician

Member of the Wyoming House of Representatives from the 36th district
- In office July 23, 2007 – 2010
- Preceded by: Liz Gentile
- Succeeded by: Gerald Gay

Personal details
- Party: Democratic
- Children: 4
- Education: Park University; University of Wyoming
- Occupation: Real estate broker

Mary Hales was a Democratic member of the Wyoming House of Representatives, representing the 36th district from 2007 until 2010. Hales was initially appointed by the Natrona County Commission to the state House seat following the resignation of Liz Gentile. She was sworn in on July 23.

She was an unpledged superdelegate in the 2016 Democratic Presidential primary, and announced her support for Hillary Clinton.

== Family ==
Hales has four children.

== Education ==
Hales obtained her degree in Political Science from Park University and her Secondary Teaching Certificate from the University of Wyoming.

== Professional experience ==
Hales was an Associate Broker for Stratton Real Estate.

== Political experience ==
- Hales was a candidate for the Wyoming House of Representatives, District 36 in 2010.
