= Erin E. Mercer =

Wyoming politician

Member of the Wyoming House of Representatives from the 53rd district
- In office October 2005 – August 12, 2009
- Preceded by: Frank W. Latta
- Succeeded by: Gregg Blikre

Personal details
- Party: Republican

Erin E. Mercer is an American Republican politician from Gillette, Campbell County, Wyoming. She was appointed to fill a vacancy in the 53rd district of the Wyoming House of Representatives in October 2005 after Frank Latta resigned. She won re-election in 2006 and 2008. She resigned on August 12, 2009.
