= Liz Gentile =

Wyoming politician

Member of the Wyoming House of Representatives from the 36th district
- In office 2007 – June 2007
- Preceded by: Gerald Gay
- Succeeded by: Mary Hales
- In office 2003–2005
- Preceded by: Gerald Gay
- Succeeded by: Gerald Gay

Personal details
- Party: Democratic

Liz Gentile is an American Democratic politician from Casper, Wyoming. She represented the 36th district in the Wyoming House of Representatives from 2003 to 2005 and again in 2007. Gentile resigned from office in June 2007.

== Electoral history ==
=== 2000 ===
==== Primary election ====
Wyoming House of Representatives, District 36, 2000 primary election * denotes incumbent Source:
Party	Candidate	Votes	%
Democratic	Liz Gentile	528	100.0
Total votes		528	100

==== General election ====
Wyoming House of Representatives, District 36, 2000 general election * denotes incumbent Source:
Party	Candidate	Votes	%
Republican	Gerald Gay	1,798	51.8
Democratic	Liz Gentile	1,673	48.2
Total votes		3,471	100

=== 2002 ===
==== Primary election ====
Wyoming House of Representatives, District 36, 2002 primary election * denotes incumbent Source:
Party	Candidate	Votes	%
Democratic	Liz Gentile	610	100.0
Total votes		610	100

==== General election ====
Wyoming House of Representatives, District 36, 2002 general election (Note: Original count was 1,461–1,460 for Gentile, and a recount yielded a result of 1,466–1,463 for Gentile. The state canvassing board declared the result null and void, ordering a special election.) * denotes incumbent Source:
Party	Candidate	Votes	%
Democratic	Liz Gentile	1,466	50.1
Republican	Bob Tanner	1,463	49.9
Total votes		2,929	100

==== Special election ====
Wyoming House of Representatives, District 36, 2002 special election * denotes incumbent Source:
Party	Candidate	Votes	%
Democratic	Liz Gentile	1,168	58.0
Republican	Bob Tanner	845	42.0
Total votes		2,013	100

=== 2004 ===
==== Primary election ====
Wyoming House of Representatives, District 36, 2004 primary election * denotes incumbent Source:
Party	Candidate	Votes	%
Democratic	Liz Gentile*	608	100.0
Total votes		608	100

==== General election ====
Wyoming House of Representatives, District 36, 2004 general election * denotes incumbent Source:
Party	Candidate	Votes	%
Republican	Gerald Gay	1,992	52.2
Democratic	Liz Gentile*	1,826	47.8
Total votes		3,818	100

=== 2006 ===
==== Primary election ====
Wyoming House of Representatives, District 36, 2006 primary election * denotes incumbent Source:
Party	Candidate	Votes	%
Democratic	Liz Gentile	428	100.0
Total votes		428	100

==== General election ====
Wyoming House of Representatives, District 36, 2006 general election * denotes incumbent Source:
Party	Candidate	Votes	%
Democratic	Liz Gentile	1,645	55.4
Republican	Gerald Gay*	1,322	45.6
Total votes		2,967	100
