= Roy Edwards (politician) =

American politician (1954–2020)

Member of the Wyoming House of Representatives from the 53rd district
- In office January 5, 2015 – November 2, 2020
- Preceded by: Gregg Blikre
- Succeeded by: Chris Knapp

Personal details
- Born: Roy Harlie Edwards; May 27, 1954 Gillette, Wyoming, U.S.
- Died: November 2, 2020 (aged 66) Casper, Wyoming, U.S.
- Party: Republican
- Spouse: Glenda
- Children: 3
- Education: Campbell County High School

Roy Harlie Edwards (May 27, 1954 – November 2, 2020) was an American politician from Wyoming.

== Early life ==
Edwards was born in Gillette, Wyoming, on May 27, 1954. He graduated from Campbell County High School in 1972.

== Career ==
Edwards was the owner of the Edwards Title Company LLC. He served on the Gillette City Council for 12 years and on the Campbell County Board of Commissioners for 8 years. On November 4, 2014, Edwards was elected to the Wyoming House of Representatives where he represented the 53rd district as a Republican. He assumed office on January 5, 2015.

== Political positions ==
He was considered politically conservative. The American Conservative Union's Center for Legislative Accountability gives him a lifetime rating of 84.14.

== Personal life ==
Edwards was an Independent Baptist. He was married to his wife, Glenda, and had three children and five grandchildren.

Edwards died in office from complications of COVID-19 in Casper, Wyoming, on November 2, 2020, at age 66, during the COVID-19 pandemic in Wyoming. His death occurred the day before the general election that year, in which he was running unopposed.
