= Harlan Edmonds =

American politician

Member of the Wyoming House of Representatives from the 12th district
- In office January 5, 2015 – August 15, 2016
- Preceded by: Lee Filer
- Succeeded by: Lars Lone

Personal details
- Party: Republican
- Spouse: Amy Edmonds
- Education: University of Kansas; University of Missouri
- Profession: Project manager

Harlan Edmonds is an American politician and a Republican member of the Wyoming House of Representatives representing District 12 from January 5, 2015, until his resignation on August 15, 2016. His wife, Amy Edmonds, was a member of the Wyoming House of Representatives for the 12th district from 2007 until 2013.

== Elections ==
=== 2014 ===
Edmonds was offered the Republican nomination after mounting a successful write-in campaign. He then defeated incumbent Democratic Representative Lee Filer 53% to 47%.

=== 2016 ===
Edmonds did not run for re-election. He resigned on August 15, 2016, after having moved out of the district.
