= John Patton (Wyoming politician) =

American politician (1930–2015)

John W. Patton

Member of the Wyoming House of Representatives from the 29th district
- In office January 2009 – April 5, 2015
- Preceded by: Jerry Iekel
- Succeeded by: Mark Kinner

Member of the Wyoming Senate
- In office January 1967 – January 1971

Member of the Wyoming House of Representatives
- In office 1965–1965

Member of the Wyoming House of Representatives
- In office 1961–1961
- Succeeded by: -->

Personal details
- Born: October 16, 1930 Glendive, Montana, U.S.
- Died: April 5, 2015 (aged 84) Sheridan, Wyoming, U.S.
- Party: Republican

John W. Patton (October 16, 1930 – April 5, 2015) was an American politician and a Republican member of the Wyoming House of Representatives representing District 29 since January 2009. Patton previously served non-consecutively in the Wyoming House of Representatives in 1961 and 1965, and in the Wyoming Senate from January 1967 until January 1971. Patton later worked with the Citizens Conference on State Legislatures as Co-Director. Patton became the Head of Intergovernmental Affairs for the Department of Transportation under Sec. Coleman during the Ford Administration. Patton died on April 5, 2015, of respiratory failure. He had suffered a heart attack seven weeks prior to his death during the Legislative Session, and continued to discuss legislation from his hospital bed with the Representatives who came to check on him.

== Elections ==
- 2012 Patton was unopposed for both the August 21, 2012 Republican Primary, winning with 997 votes, and the November 6, 2012 General election, winning with 3,414 votes.
- 1966 Patton was elected to the Wyoming Senate in the November 8, 1966 General election.
- 2008 When Republican Representative Jerry Iekel retired and left the District 29 seat open, Patton won the August 19, 2008 Republican Primary with 827 votes (67.7%), and won the November 4, 2008 General election with 3,239 votes (75.8%) against Libertarian candidate Elmer Kuball, who had run for the seat in 1992, 1996, and 2000.
- 2010 Patton was unopposed for both the August 17, 2010 Republican Primary, winning with 1,111 votes, and the November 2, 2010 General election, winning with 2,228 votes.
