= Hans Hunt =

American politician

Member of the Wyoming House of Representatives from the 2nd district
- In office January 11, 2011 – October 4, 2021
- Preceded by: Ross Diercks
- Succeeded by: J. D. Williams

Personal details
- Party: Republican
- Education: University of Wyoming
- Profession: Rancher

Hans Hunt is an American politician and a former Republican Party member of the Wyoming House of Representatives who represented District 2 from January 11, 2011 to October 4, 2021. He resigned in 2021 to join Wyoming Senator Cynthia Lummis's office as an agriculture and trade policy adviser.

== Elections ==
- 2020: Hunt was unopposed in the August 18, 2020 Republican primary and won with 2,299 votes. He was unopposed in the November 3, 2020 general election and won with 4,121 votes.
- 2018: Hunt was unopposed in the August 21, 2018 Republican primary, winning with 2,607 votes and was unopposed in the November 6, 2018 general election, winning with 3,261 votes.
- 2016: Hunt was unopposed in the August 16, 2016 Republican primary, winning with 2,002 votes and defeated Democrat Harold Eaton in the November 8, 2016 general election with 3,863 votes (86.09%).
- 2014: Hunt was unopposed for the August 19, 2014 Republican primary, winning with 2,352 votes and was unopposed in the November 4, 2014 general election, winning with 2,985 votes.
- 2012 Hunt won the August 21, 2012 Republican primary with 1,924 votes (78.5%), and was unopposed for the November 6, 2012 general election, winning with 3,966 votes.
- 2010: after Democratic Representative Ross Diercks retired and left the district 2 seat open, Hunt won the three-way August 17, 2010 Republican primary with 1,217 votes (44.0%), and was unopposed for the November 2, 2010 general election, winning with 2,905 votes.
