= Wyoming's 36th House of Representatives district =

American legislative district

Wyoming's 36th State House of Representatives district
- Wyoming's 36th House of Representatives district as of 2022
Representative
Art Washut; R–Casper
- Demographics: 85% White; 1% Black; 10% Hispanic; 4% Multiracial
- Population (2022): 9,758

Wyoming's 36th House of Representatives district is one of 62 districts in the Wyoming House of Representatives. The district encompasses part of Natrona County. It is represented by Republican Representative Art Washut of Casper.

In 1992, the state of Wyoming switched from electing state legislators by county to a district-based system.

== List of members representing the district ==
Representative	Party	Term	Note
Bruce Hinchey	Republican	1993 – 1999	Elected in 1992. Re-elected in 1994. Re-elected in 1996.
Deborah Fleming	Democratic	1999 – 2001	Elected in 1998.
Gerald Gay	Republican	2001 – 2003	Elected in 2000.
Liz Gentile	Democratic	2003 – 2005	Elected in 2002.
Gerald Gay	Republican	2005 – 2007	Elected in 2004.
Liz Gentile	Democratic	2007	Elected in 2006. Resigned in 2007.
Mary Hales	Democratic	2007 – 2011	Appointed in 2007. Re-elected in 2008.
Gerald Gay	Republican	2011 – 2017	Elected in 2010. Re-elected in 2012. Re-elected in 2014.
Debbie Bovee	Democratic	2017 – 2019	Elected in 2016.
Art Washut	Republican	2019 – present	Elected in 2018. Re-elected in 2020. Re-elected in 2022. Re-elected in 2024.

== Recent election results ==
=== 2014 ===
House district 36 general election
Party	Candidate	Votes	%
Republican	Gerald Gay (Incumbent)	1,219	53.55%
Democratic	Eric Nelson	1,051	46.17%
Write-ins		6	0.26%
Total votes		2,276	100.0%
Invalid or blank votes		101	
Republican hold			

=== 2016 ===
House district 36 general election
Party	Candidate	Votes	%
Democratic	Debbie Bovee	1,910	52.64%
Republican	Gerald Gay (Incumbent)	1,698	46.80%
Write-ins		20	0.55%
Total votes		3,628	100.0%
Invalid or blank votes		158	
Democratic gain from Republican			

=== 2018 ===
House district 36 general election
Party	Candidate	Votes	%
Republican	Art Washut	1,407	55.94%
Democratic	Debbie Bovee (Incumbent)	1,106	43.97%
Write-ins		2	0.07%
Total votes		2,515	100.0%
Invalid or blank votes		48	
Republican gain from Democratic			

=== 2020 ===
House district 36 general election
Party	Candidate	Votes	%
Republican	Art Washut (Incumbent)	3,041	96.53%
Write-ins		109	3.46%
Total votes		3,150	100.0%
Invalid or blank votes		649	
Republican hold			

=== 2022 ===
House district 36 general election
Party	Candidate	Votes	%
Republican	Art Washut (Incumbent)	1,768	96.61%
Write-ins		62	3.38%
Total votes		1,830	100.0%
Invalid or blank votes		458	
Republican hold			

=== 2024 ===
House district 36 general election
Party	Candidate	Votes	%
Republican	Art Washut (Incumbent)	2,727	97.01%
Write-ins		84	2.98%
Total votes		2,811	100.0%
Invalid or blank votes		709	
Republican hold			

== Historical district boundaries ==
Map	Description	Apportionment Plan	Notes
	Natrona County (part)	1992 Apportionment Plan	
	Natrona County (part)	2002 Apportionment Plan	
	Natrona County (part)	2012 Apportionment Plan	
