= Wyoming's 5th House of Representatives district =

American legislative district

Wyoming's 5th State House of Representatives district
- Wyoming's 5th House of Representatives district as of 2022
Representative
Scott Smith; R–Lingle
- Demographics: 84% White; 1% Black; 11% Hispanic; 1% Native American; 3% Multiracial
- Population (2022): 10,135

Wyoming's 5th House of Representatives district is one of 62 districts in the Wyoming House of Representatives. The district encompasses part of Goshen County. It is represented by Republican Representative Scott Smith of Lingle.

In 1992, the state of Wyoming switched from electing state legislators by county to a district-based system.

== List of members representing the district ==
Representative	Party	Term	Note
James Hageman	Republican	1993 – 2006	Elected in 1992. Re-elected in 1994. Re-elected in 1996. Re-elected in 1998. Re-elected in 2000. Re-elected in 2002. Re-elected in 2004. Died in 2006.
Matt Teeters	Republican	2006 – 2015	Appointed in 2006. Re-elected in 2006. Re-elected in 2008. Re-elected in 2010. Re-elected in 2012.
Cheri Steinmetz	Republican	2015 – 2019	Elected in 2014. Re-elected in 2016.
Shelly Duncan	Republican	2019 – 2023	Elected in 2018. Re-elected in 2020.
Scott Smith	Republican	2023 – present	Elected in 2022. Re-elected in 2024.
Joe Speckner	Republican	2027 – member-elect	Elected in 2026.

== Recent election results ==
=== 2014 ===
House district 5 general election
Party	Candidate	Votes	%
Republican	Cheri Steinmetz	2,776	98.09%
Write-ins		54	1.90%
Total votes		2,830	100.0%
Invalid or blank votes		497	
Republican hold			

=== 2016 ===
House district 5 general election
Party	Candidate	Votes	%
Republican	Cheri Steinmetz (Incumbent)	3,798	98.16%
Write-ins		71	1.83%
Total votes		3,869	100.0%
Invalid or blank votes		587	
Republican hold			

=== 2018 ===
House district 5 general election
Party	Candidate	Votes	%
Republican	Shelly Duncan	2,760	76.68%
Democratic	Joan Brinkley	798	22.17%
Write-ins		41	1.13%
Total votes		3,599	100.0%
Invalid or blank votes		129	
Republican hold			

=== 2020 ===
House district 5 general election
Party	Candidate	Votes	%
Republican	Shelly Duncan (Incumbent)	4,122	96.87%
Write-ins		133	3.12%
Total votes		4,255	100.0%
Invalid or blank votes		556	
Republican hold			

=== 2022 ===
House district 5 general election
Party	Candidate	Votes	%
Republican	Scott Smith	2,195	57.71%
Independent	Todd Peterson	1,603	42.15%
Write-ins		5	0.13%
Total votes		3,803	100.0%
Invalid or blank votes		55	
Republican hold			

=== 2024 ===
House district 5 general election
Party	Candidate	Votes	%
Republican	Scott Smith (Incumbent)	3,893	92.77%
Write-ins		303	7.22%
Total votes		4,196	100.0%
Invalid or blank votes		686	
Republican hold			

== Historical district boundaries ==
Map	Description	Apportionment Plan	Notes
	Converse County (part); Goshen County (part); Platte County (part)	1992 Apportionment Plan	
	Goshen County (part); Platte County (part)	2002 Apportionment Plan	
	Goshen County (part)	2012 Apportionment Plan	
