= Curt Meier =

American politician

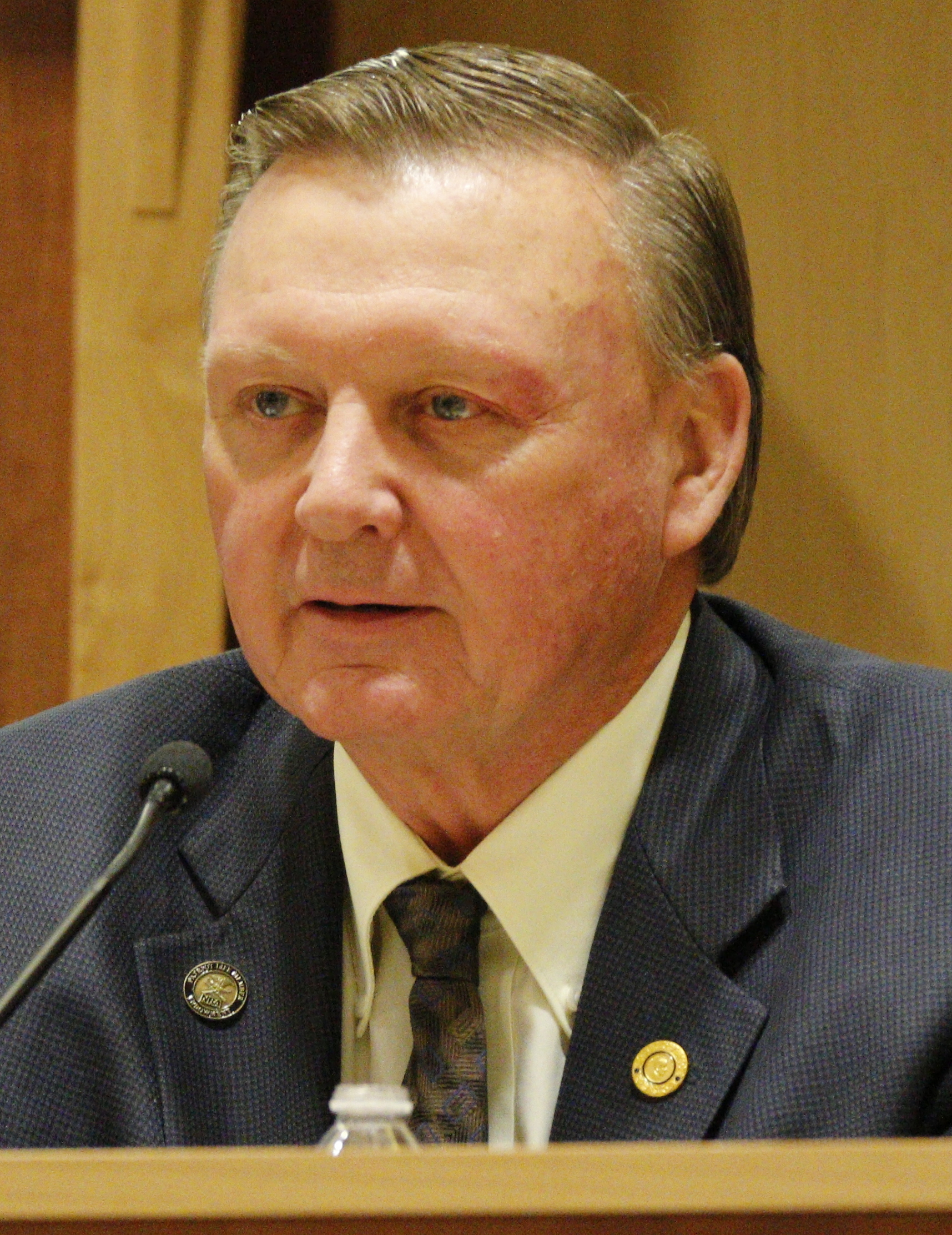

30th Treasurer of Wyoming
- Incumbent
- Assumed office January 7, 2019
- Governor: Mark Gordon
- Preceded by: Mark Gordon

Member of the Wyoming Senate from the 3rd district
- In office January 1995 – January 8, 2019
- Preceded by: Jim Geringer
- Succeeded by: Cheri Steinmetz

Personal details
- Born: Curtis Eugene Meier Jr. January 1, 1953 (age 73) La Grange, Wyoming, U.S.
- Party: Republican
- Spouse: Charlene
- Education: University of Wyoming (BS)

Curtis Eugene Meier Jr. (born January 1, 1953) is an American politician. A Republican, he is currently serving as Wyoming State Treasurer. He was a member of the Wyoming Senate, representing the 3rd district from 1995 through 2019.

Meier was appointed to the Senate in 1995 after then-incumbent Republican Senator Jim Geringer was elected Governor of Wyoming. Meier was elected state treasurer in 2018, and took office on January 7, 2019.

Political offices
Preceded by Mark Gordon	Treasurer of Wyoming; 2019–present	Incumbent
