= Dick Sadler =

American politician (1928–2019)

Member of the Wyoming House of Representatives
- In office 1971–1975

Member of the Wyoming Senate
- In office 1975–1983
- In office 1990s

Personal details
- Born: Richard Sherman Sadler; September 10, 1928 Hawarden, Iowa, U.S.
- Died: May 10, 2019 (aged 90)
- Party: Democratic

Richard Sherman Sadler (September 10, 1928 – May 10, 2019) was an American politician in the state of Wyoming. He served in the Wyoming House of Representatives and Wyoming Senate as a member of the Democratic Party.

He was previously the director of the Wyoming Employment Security Commission.
