= Clark Stith =

American politician (born 1961)

Speaker pro tempore of the Wyoming House of Representatives
- In office January 10, 2023 – January 14, 2025
- Preceded by: Mike Greear
- Succeeded by: Jeremy Haroldson

Member of the Wyoming House of Representatives from the 48th district
- In office June 5, 2017 – January 2025
- Preceded by: Mark Baker
- Succeeded by: Darin McCann

Personal details
- Born: May 19, 1961 (age 65) Atchison, Kansas, U.S.
- Party: Republican
- Children: 2
- Education: University of Kansas (BA); Georgetown University (JD, MS)

Clark Stith (born May 19, 1961) is an American politician and who served as a Republican member of the Wyoming House of Representatives representing District 48 from June 5, 2017 to January 2025.

== Career ==
Prior to his elevation to the Wyoming House of Representatives, Stith was Chairman of the Sweetwater County Republican Party. He was elected to the Rock Springs City Council in 2012 to replace retiring City Councilor Joyce Corcoran and was reelected in 2016. Stith resigned from the City Council after moving out of the ward.

Stith has practiced law in Rock Springs since 1997.

== Elections ==
=== 2000 ===
Stith challenged incumbent Democratic State Senator Rae Lynn Job in the general election, having won the Republican nomination unopposed. Job defeated Stith with 55.6% of the vote.

=== 2002 ===
After incumbent Democratic State Representative Bud Nelson announced his retirement, Stith announced his candidacy for House District 48. Stith won the Republican primary unopposed, and faced former Rock Springs City Councilman Marty Martin in the general election. Martin defeated Stith with 55.1% of the vote.

=== 2008 ===
Stith challenged incumbent Democratic State Representative Bernadine Craft in the general election, having won the Republican nomination for House District 17 unopposed. Craft defeated Stith with 53.8% of the vote.

=== 2012 ===
When incumbent Republican State Treasurer Joe Meyer died, Stith was one of three finalists submitted to Governor Matt Mead as Meyer's replacement. Rancher and former Congressional candidate Mark Gordon was ultimately appointed to the position.

=== 2014 ===
After incumbent Republican Secretary of State Max Maxfield announced his retirement, Stith announced his candidacy, becoming the second Republican to enter the race behind State Representative Dan Zwonitzer who later withdrew. Stith faced former Speaker of the Wyoming House of Representatives Ed Buchanan, former State Representative Pete Illoway, and businessman Ed Murray in the Republican primary. Stith placed last in the primary, having won only 8.6% of the vote.

=== 2017 ===
Stith was appointed by the Sweetwater County Commission to fill the vacancy in House District 48 after incumbent Republican Representative Mark Baker resigned, having moved out of the district.

=== 2024 ===
Stith was defeated in his attempt at re-election in 2024.

=== 2026 ===
Stith was appointed as a District Court Judge in Sweetwater County by Governor Mark Gordon on March 12th, 2026. This appointment filled the vacancy of District Court Judge Richard Lavery and became effective on April 18th, 2026.

Wyoming House of Representatives
Preceded by Mike Greear	Speaker pro tempore of the Wyoming House of Representatives; 2023–2025	Succeeded by Jeremy Haroldson
