= 2014 Wyoming Secretary of State election =

- November 4, 2014
- Turnout: 65.05% ▼3.13%
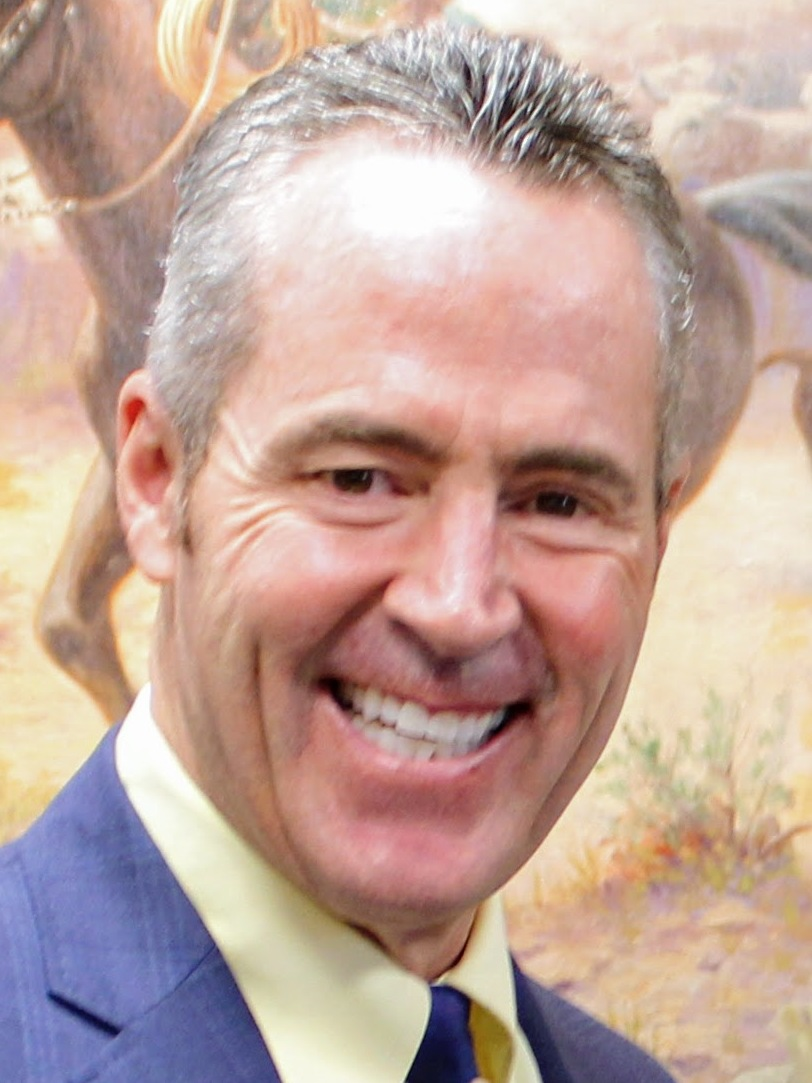

Nominee	Ed Murray	Jennifer Young	Howard "Kit" Carson
Party	Republican	Constitution	Libertarian
Popular vote	119,772	18,918	16,858
Percentage	76.58%	12.10%	10.78%
- County results Murray: 70–80% 80–90%
Secretary of State before election
Max Maxfield
Republican
Elected Secretary of State
Ed Murray
Republican

The Wyoming Secretary of State election of 2014 took place on November 4, 2014. The incumbent Secretary of State, Max Maxfield, chose not to run for reelection. Real estate investor Ed Murray defeated Jennifer Young and Howard "Kit" Carson of the Constitution and Libertarian parties without any opposition from the Wyoming Democratic Party with 69.98% of the vote. However, despite losing the Republican primary Edward Buchanan would later be appointed Secretary of State after Murray's resignation.

== Republican primary ==
=== Candidates ===
==== Declared ====
- Ed Murray, real estate investor
- Edward Buchanan, Speaker of the Wyoming House of Representatives
- Peter S. Illoway, state Representative
- Clark Stith, member of the Rock Springs City Council from Ward 1

==== Withdrew ====
- Dan Zwonitzer, state representative

==== Declined ====
- Max Maxfield, incumbent Secretary of State

==== Fundraising ====
Campaign finance reports
Candidate	Amount raised
Ed Murray	$508,200
Edward Buchanan	$124,816
Peter S. Illoway	$119,017
Clark Stith	$35,557
Source: OpenSecrets

==== Results ====
Republican primary results
Party	Candidate	Votes	%
Republican	Ed Murray	32,944	36.75%
Republican	Edward Buchanan	31,312	34.93%
Republican	Peter S. Illoway	16,596	18.52%
Republican	Clark Stith	8,511	9.50%
Write-In	Write-In	274	0.31%
Total votes		156,407	100%

== Third Parties ==
=== Candidates ===
==== Declared ====
- Jennifer Young (Constitution), Wyoming Constitution Party Chairwoman
- Howard Carson (Libertarian), future President of the Wyoming Libertarian Party

== Fundraising ==
Campaign finance reports
Candidate	Amount raised
Ed Murray	$508,200
Jennifer Young	$10,121
Howard Carson	$0

== Results ==
Wyoming Secretary of State election, 2014
Party	Candidate	Votes	%
Republican	Ed Murray	119,772	76.58%
Constitution	Jennifer Young	18,918	12.10%
Libertarian	Howard Carson	16,858	10.78%
Write-In	Write-In	859	0.55%
Total votes		156,407	100%
