= 2010 Wyoming elections =

A general election was held in the U.S. state of Wyoming on Tuesday, November 2, 2010. All of the state's executive officers—the Governor, Secretary of State, Auditor, Treasurer, and Superintendent of Public Instruction—were up for election.

== Gubernatorial election ==
Incumbent Governor Dave Freudenthal, a Democrat, was ostensibly unable to run for re-election due to term limits. Despite the questionable legality of the state's term limits, Freudenthal did not challenge his inability to seek re-election and declined to seek a third term. Former U.S. Attorney Matt Mead narrowly won the Republican nomination while former Teton County Commissioner Leslie Petersen won the Democratic primary. In the general election, Mead defeated Petersen in a landslide.

Wyoming gubernatorial election, 2010
Party	Candidate	Votes	%	±%
Republican	Matt Mead	123,780	65.68%	+35.67%
Democratic	Leslie Petersen	43,240	22.94%	−47.05%
Independent	Taylor Haynes	13,796	7.32%	
Libertarian	Mike Wheeler	5,362	2.85%	
Write-in		2,285	1.21%	
Majority		80,540	42.74%	+2.75%
Turnout		190,822		
Republican gain from Democratic		Swing		

== Secretary of State ==
Incumbent Secretary of State Max Maxfield, a Republican, ran for re-election to a second term.

=== Democratic primary ===
==== Candidates ====
- Andrew Simons, political activist

==== Results ====
Democratic Party primary results
Party	Candidate	Votes	%
Democratic	Andrew Simons	19,880	99.41
Democratic	Write-ins	117	0.59
Total votes		19,997	100.00

=== Republican primary ===
==== Candidates ====
- Max Maxfield, incumbent Secretary of State

==== Results ====
Republican Primary results
Party	Candidate	Votes	%
Republican	Max Maxfield (inc.)	91,484	99.57
Republican	Write-ins	399	0.43
Total votes		91,883	100.00

=== General election ===
==== Results ====
Results by county Maxfield: 50–60%; 60–70%; 70–80%; 80–90%

2010 Wyoming Secretary of State election
Party	Candidate	Votes	%	±%
Republican	Max Maxfield (inc.)	140,087	76.07%	−5.92%
Democratic	Andrew Simons	35,873	19.48%	+19.48%
Libertarian	Candice De Laat	8,045	4.37%	−13.64%
Write-in		151	0.08%	+0.08%
Majority		104,214	56.59%	−7.39%
Turnout		184,156		
Republican hold		Swing		

== Auditor ==
Incumbent Republican Auditor Rita Meyer opted to run for Governor rather than seek re-election to a second term. In the Republican primary, two accountants—Jim Brown, the former vice-chairman of the Republican Party of Wyoming, who unsuccessfully ran against Meyer in 2006, and Cynthia Cloud—ran to succeed her. During the campaign, Brown attracted widespread support from the Republican establishment and outraised Cloud, but she narrowly defeated him in the primary, which the Casper Star-Tribune called "the biggest upset of the election."

No Democrat filed for the race, but former State Senator and then-Casper City Councilman Keith Goodenough won 31 write-in votes, despite not being a candidate. Under Wyoming law, Goodenough could have accepted the nomination, but ultimately declined to do so, opting to run for re-election to the Casper City Council instead.

=== Democratic primary ===
==== Candidates ====
No Democratic candidates filed.

==== Results ====
Democratic Party primary results
Party	Candidate	Votes	%
Democratic	Write-ins	839	100.00
Total votes		839	100.00

=== Republican primary ===
==== Candidates ====
- Cynthia Cloud, accountant
- Bruce Brown, accountant, former vice-chairman of the Republican Party of Wyoming, 2006 candidate for State Auditor

==== Results ====
Republican Primary results
Party	Candidate	Votes	%
Republican	Cynthia Cloud	47,427	50.76
Republican	Bruce Brown	45,861	49.08
Total votes		93,439	100.00

=== General election ===
==== Results ====
Results by county Cloud: 90–100%

2010 Wyoming Auditor election
Party	Candidate	Votes	%	±%
Republican	Cynthia Cloud	157,848	99.00%	+30.93%
Write-in		1,598	1.00%	
Majority		156,250	98.00%	+61.86%
Turnout		159,446		
Republican hold		Swing		

== Treasurer ==
Incumbent Republican Treasurer Joe Meyer, first elected in 2006, opted to run for re-election. He was unopposed in the Republican primary, and no Democratic candidates filed to run in the primary. Worth Christie, an insurance agent in Casper, despite not being a candidate, received 30 write-in votes in the Democratic primary. However, Christie ultimately declined to accept the nomination, instead opting to run for the Casper College Board of Trustees. With no candidates filed to run against him, Meyer was re-elected unopposed. However, just two years into his term, Meyer would die in office and was replaced by Mark Gordon.

=== Democratic primary ===
==== Candidates ====
No candidates filed.

==== Results ====
Democratic Party primary results
Party	Candidate	Votes	%
Democratic	Write-ins	727	100.00
Total votes		727	100.00

=== Republican primary ===
==== Candidates ====
- Joe Meyer, incumbent Treasurer

==== Results ====
Republican Primary results
Party	Candidate	Votes	%
Republican	Joe Meyer (inc.)	90,528	99.66
Republican	Write-ins	313	0.34
Total votes		90,841	100.00

=== General election ===
==== Results ====
Results by county Meyer: 90–100%

2010 Wyoming Treasurer election
Party	Candidate	Votes	%	±%
Republican	Joe Meyer (inc.)	159,436	99.20%	+26.48%
Write-in		1,282	0.80%	
Majority		158,154	98.40%	+52.96%
Turnout		160,718		
Republican hold		Swing		

== Superintendent of Public Instruction ==
Incumbent Republican Superintendent of Public Instruction Jim McBride ran for re-election to a second term. However, owing to the controversy surrounding the state's standardized testing system, he faced strong competition in the Republican primary from Cindy Hill, a high school assistant principal; Trent Blankenship, the former Superintendent of Public Instruction; and Ted Adams, the Laramie County School District 1 Superintendent. Hill established herself as the leading candidate against McBride, with polling showing her with a double-digit lead on the incumbent while Blankenship was forced to defend his 2005 decision to abruptly resign from office. Ultimately, Hill won the primary by a wide margin, winning 49% of the vote to McBridge's 25%, Blankenship's 15%, and Adams's 11%.

Meanwhile, State Senator Mike Massie, long considered a candidate for statewide office, won the Democratic primary unopposed and emerged as the party's strongest candidate in the statewide races. He campaigned on ditching the state's beleaguered standardized testing regime and attacked Hill for releasing her education plan only weeks before the election. Popular Democratic Governor Dave Freudenthal endorsed Massie as the general election started, and criticized the state's Republican leadership for its inaction in fixing education problems. He also won the endorsement of the Casper Star-Tribune, which praised his "clear handle on what needs to happen at the Department of Education" and argued that he was "the right person at the right time for this very demanding job." The Star-Tribune criticized Hill for the delay in releasing her platform, which it called "more of a philosophical statement than a blueprint to improve education." The Jackson Hole News and Guide also endorsed Massie, praising him as "well-versed in the education issues Wyoming faces" and as a policymaker who "listens and offers pragmatic solutions to the problems facing Wyoming educators today." As the campaign closed out, Massie's fundraising remained strong, allowing him to stay competitive with Hill.

Despite Massie's strength as a candidate, however, he was unable to overcome the state's significant Republican lean, and lost to Hill in a landslide, winning only 39% of the vote to her 61%. However, in so doing, he received the most votes of any statewide Democratic candidate, significantly outpacing Leslie Petersen, the party's gubernatorial nominee.

=== Democratic primary ===
==== Candidates ====
- Mike Massie, State Senator

==== Results ====
Democratic Party primary results
Party	Candidate	Votes	%
Democratic	Mike Massie	20,478	99.20
Democratic	Write-ins	165	0.80
Total votes		20,643	100.00

=== Republican primary ===
==== Candidates ====
- Cindy Hill, assistant high school principal
- Jim McBride, incumbent Superintendent of Public Instruction
- Trent Blankenship, former Superintendent of Public Instruction
- Ted Adams, Laramie County School District 1 Superintendent

==== Results ====
Republican Party primary results
Party	Candidate	Votes	%
Republican	Cindy Hill	47,165	49.20
Republican	Jim McBride (inc.)	24,284	25.33
Republican	Trent Blankenship	13,988	14.59
Republican	Ted Adams	10,227	10.67
Republican	Write-ins	209	0.22
Total votes		95,873	100.00

=== General election ===
==== Results ====
Results by county Hill: 50–60%; 60–70%; 70–80%; 80–90%; Massie: 50–60%; 60–70%

2010 Wyoming Superintendent of Public Instruction election
Party	Candidate	Votes	%	±%
Republican	Cindy Hill	113,026	61.08%	+2.54%
Democratic	Mike Massie	71,772	38.79%	−2.67%
Write-in		250	0.14%	
Turnout		185,048		
Republican hold		Swing		
