= 2022 Wyoming Secretary of State election =

- November 8, 2022
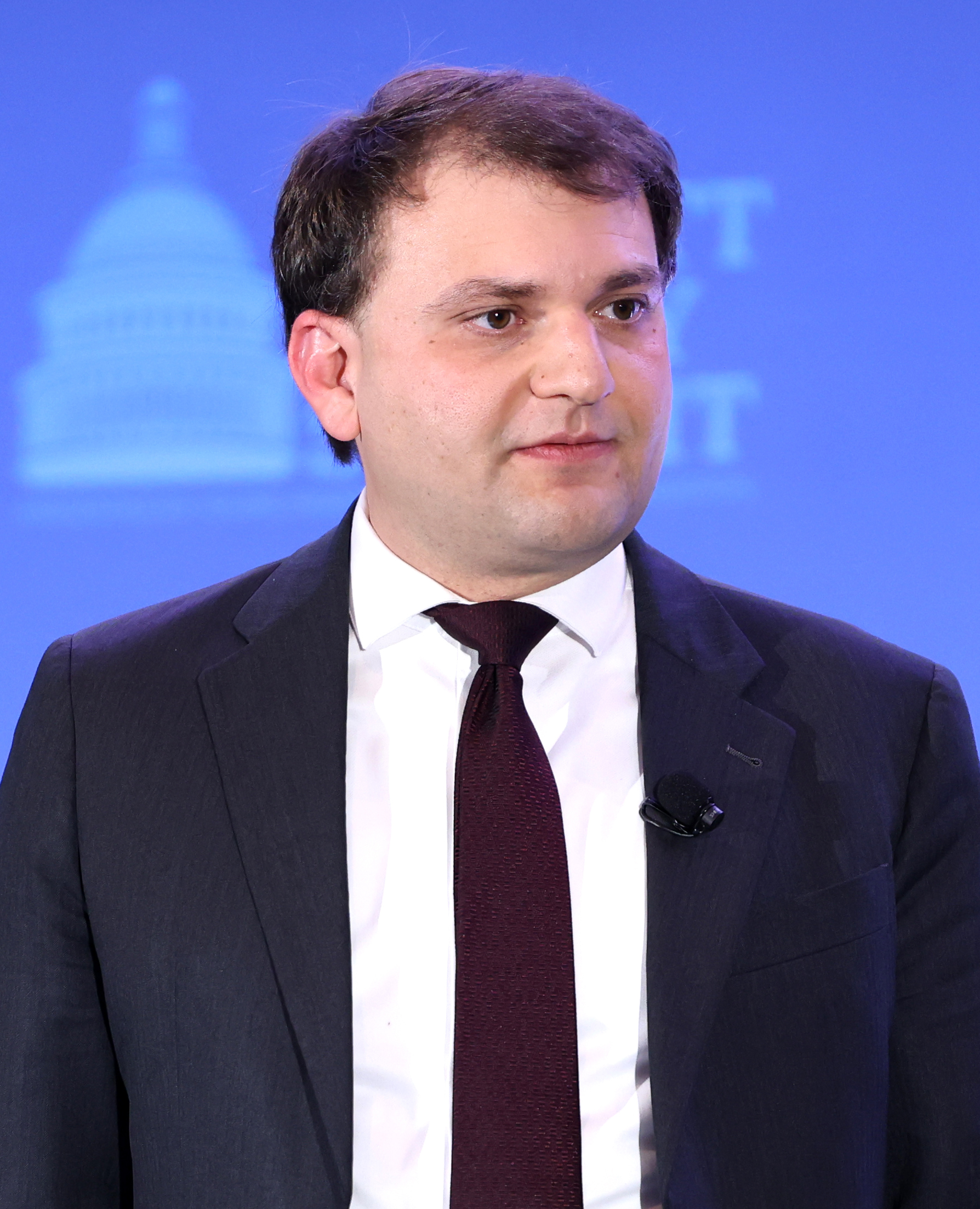
Nominee	Chuck Gray	Write-ins
Party	Republican
Popular vote	147,368	13,574
Percentage	91.57%	8.43%
- County results Gray: 70–80% 80–90% >90%
Secretary of State before election
Karl Allred (acting)
Republican
Elected Secretary of State
Chuck Gray
Republican

The 2022 Wyoming Secretary of State election was held on November 8, 2022, to elect the Secretary of State of Wyoming. On April 18, 2022, incumbent Republican Edward Buchanan announced that he would run for re-election, but on May 17 he reversed this decision, choosing not to seek a second term. State Representative Chuck Gray won the Republican nomination on August 16 with the backing of Donald Trump. He is a supporter of Trump's false claim that he won the 2020 election. Gray was unopposed in the general election.

== Republican primary ==
=== Candidates ===
==== Nominee ====
- Chuck Gray, state representative

==== Eliminated in primary ====
- Mark Armstrong, geologist and candidate for U.S. Senate in 2020
- Tara Nethercott, state senator

==== Withdrew ====
- Edward Buchanan, incumbent secretary of state
- Dan Dockstader (remained on ballot), President of the Wyoming Senate (endorsed Nethercott)

=== Endorsements ===
Chuck Gray

U.S. presidents

- Donald Trump, 45th and 47th President of the United States
Tara Nethercott

Statewide officials

- Max Maxfield, 20th Secretary of State of Wyoming

=== Campaign ===
Both Tara Nethercott and Chuck Gray made "election integrity" a campaign focus, though with competing approaches to the subject.

Chuck Gray was described by the Associated Press as "one of Wyoming's most Trump-like legislators". He briefly entered the 2022 House of Representatives election against Liz Cheney after her vote to impeach Trump over the January 6, 2021, U.S. Capitol attack, but failed to secure Trump's endorsement and withdrew to run for secretary of state. Gray attended the 2021 Maricopa County presidential ballot audit, and has advocated banning ballot drop boxes and instituting mandatory hand-counted election audits. He advocates the false position that the 2020 presidential election was stolen from Trump and has hosted screenings of Dinesh D'Souza's election conspiracy film 2000 Mules across the state. He has accused the media of refusing to cover evidence of electoral fraud. Gray was endorsed by Trump in August.

Tara Nethercott affirmed the 2020 election as secure, saying "there has been no objective evidence to indicate that the 2020 presidential election was stolen," and "continuing allegations to the contrary are undermining our country". Nethercott served on the 2017 Plan for Aging Voting Equipment Task Force, and her approach to election integrity involved shifting to machines without internet connectivity and streamlining the processing of absentee ballots. In 2022, she voted for a law that gave clerks the option to process absentee ballots received before election day. Gray voted against the bill, calling it an "awful piece of legislation".

Days before the August 16 primary election, Chuck Gray's campaign sent text messages to primary voters claiming Tara Nethercott was being sued for slander, was being investigated for violations of campaign finance law, and voted for a $30,000 pay raise for herself. In a fact check, WyoFile determined all three allegations to be untrue. Nethercott had previously sent mailers to voters criticizing Gray for personally loaning $300,000 to one of his previous campaigns. Given Gray's reported annual income of $11,000, the source of the funds was unclear. Former secretary of state Max Maxfield, who endorsed Nethercott, filed a federal complaint against Gray alleging the money had come from a political action committee rather than his finances. Gray countered that the money was an inheritance from his grandfather. When reached for comment by WyoFile about the anti-Nethercott texts, Gray declined to comment on the texts and instead accused Nethercott of lying in her mailer.

=== Results ===
Results by county: Gray: 40–50%; 50–60%; 60–70%; Nethercott: 40–50%; 50–60%; 70–80%

Republican primary results
Party	Candidate	Votes	%
Republican	Chuck Gray	75,972	48.3
Republican	Tara Nethercott	63,069	40.1
Republican	Mark Armstrong	14,304	9.1
Republican	Dan Dockstader (withdrawn)	3,698	2.3
Write-in		410	0.3
Total votes		157,453	100%

== General election ==
=== Predictions ===
Source	Ranking	As of
Sabato's Crystal Ball	Safe R	December 1, 2021
Elections Daily	Safe R	November 7, 2022

=== Results ===
2022 Wyoming Secretary of State election
Party	Candidate	Votes	%
Republican	Chuck Gray	147,402	91.57
Write-in		13,573	8.43
Total votes		160,975	100.0
Republican hold			

County Flips: Republican Hold Flip

==== By county ====
Vote breakdown by county
	Chuck Gray Republican		All Others	
County	Votes	%	Votes	%
Albany	7,574	82.6%	1,591	17.4%
Big Horn	3,743	97.2%	108	2.8%
Campbell	10,763	97.1%	329	2.9%
Carbon	3,894	95.0%	206	5.0%
Converse	4,171	95.1%	216	4.9%
Crook	2,884	97.5%	74	2.5%
Fremont	9,795	91.2%	943	8.8%
Goshen	4,144	95.8%	180	4.2%
Hot Springs	1,758	94.7%	98	5.3%
Johnson	3,168	94.9%	169	5.1%
Laramie	20,756	84.5%	3,800	15.5%
Lincoln	6,399	96.7%	215	3.3%
Natrona	16,105	88.4%	2,109	11.6%
Niobrara	928	96.3%	36	3.7%
Park	10,311	95.0%	539	5.0%
Platte	3,382	96.2%	132	3.8%
Sheridan	9,477	92.4%	784	7.6%
Sublette	2,934	94.7%	164	5.3%
Sweetwater	9,703	96.4%	365	3.6%
Teton	4,826	80.0%	1,207	20.0%
Uinta	5,586	97.0%	172	3.0%
Washakie	2,630	97.0%	82	3.0%
Weston	2,471	97.9%	54	2.1%

Counties that flipped from Democratic to Republican

- Teton (largest municipality: Jackson)
