= 2002 Wyoming state elections =

A general election was held in the U.S. state of Wyoming on Tuesday, November 5, 2002. All of the state's executive officers—the Governor, Secretary of State, Auditor, Treasurer, and Superintendent of Public Instruction—were up for election.

== Gubernatorial election ==
Republican Governor Jim Geringer could not seek re-election due to term limits. Following a competitive primary, former State House Speaker Eli Bebout emerged as the Republican nominee. He faced Democrat Dave Freudenthal, the former U.S. Attorney. Despite the state's strong Republican lean, Freudenthal narrowly defeated Bebout, winning 50% of the vote to his 48%.

2002 Wyoming gubernatorial election
Party	Candidate	Votes	%	±%
Democratic	Dave Freudenthal	92,662	49.96%	+9.51%
Republican	Eli Bebout	88,873	47.92%	−7.68%
Libertarian	Dave Dawson	3,924	2.12%	−1.83%
Majority		3,789	2.04%	−13.10%
Turnout		185,459		
Democratic gain from Republican				

== Secretary of State ==
2002 Wyoming Secretary of State election
- November 5, 2002
Nominee	Joseph Meyer	Dennis Brossman
Party	Republican	Libertarian
Popular vote	139,721	29,751
Percentage	82.4%	17.6%
- Meyer: 50–60% 60–70% 70–80% 80–90% >90% Brossman: 50–60%
Secretary of State before election
Joseph Meyer
Republican
Elected Secretary of State
Joseph Meyer
Republican

Republican Joe Meyer, the incumbent Secretary of State, ran for re-election to a second term. He won the Republican primary unopposed and was originally challenged by retired attorney Jim Fagan, the Democratic nominee. However, shortly after winning the Democratic nomination, Fagan dropped out of the race, citing his lack of endurance for the contest. After Fagan's withdrawal, Meyer's only opponent was Libertarian Dennis Brossman, whom he handily defeated with 82% of the vote.

=== Democratic primary ===
==== Candidates ====
- Jim Fagan, retired attorney

==== Results ====
Democratic Party primary results
Party	Candidate	Votes	%
Democratic	Jim Fagan	30,918	100.00
Total votes		30,918	100.00

=== Republican primary ===
==== Candidates ====
- Joe Meyer, incumbent Secretary of State

==== Results ====
Republican Primary results
Party	Candidate	Votes	%
Republican	Joe Meyer (inc.)	81,476	100.00
Total votes		81,476	100.00

=== General election ===
==== Results ====
2002 Wyoming Secretary of State election
Party	Candidate	Votes	%	±%
Republican	Joe Meyer (inc.)	139,721	82.44%	+22.24%
Libertarian	Dennis Brossman	29,751	17.56%	+17.56%
Majority		109,970	64.89%	+44.48%
Turnout		169,472		
Republican hold				

== Auditor ==
Incumbent State Auditor Max Maxfield, a Republican, ran for re-election to a second term. He faced State Senator Mark O. Harris, the Democratic nominee, in the general election. Harris launched a vigorous campaign against Maxfield, attacking the incumbent for a data breach in the Auditor's office and for delivering a no-bid contract to a Virginia-based security company. In a boost to his chances with the conservative electorate, Harris was endorsed by the NRA Political Victory Fund, which gave him an A+ rating and had previously awarded him the Defender of Freedom Award. Maxfield ultimately ended up winning re-election over Harris in a landslide, winning 67% of the vote to Harris's 33%.

=== Democratic primary ===
==== Candidates ====
- Mark O. Harris, State Senator from Sweetwater County

==== Results ====
Democratic Party primary results
Party	Candidate	Votes	%
Democratic	Mark O. Harris	31,104	100.00
Total votes		31,104	100.00

=== Republican primary ===
==== Candidates ====
- Max Maxfield, incumbent State Auditor

==== Results ====
Republican Primary results
Party	Candidate	Votes	%
Republican	Joe Meyer (inc.)	80,829	100.00
Total votes		80,829	100.00

=== General election ===
==== Results ====
2002 Wyoming Auditor election
Party	Candidate	Votes	%	±%
Republican	Max Maxfield (inc.)	119,857	66.76%	−33.24%
Democratic	Mark O. Harris	59,668	33.24%	+33.24%
Majority		60,189	33.53%	−66.47%
Turnout		179,525		
Republican hold				

Results by county Maxfield: 50–60%; 60–70%; 70–80%; 80–90%; Harris: 50–60%

== Treasurer ==
Incumbent Republican State Treasurer Cynthia Lummis ran for re-election to a second term. No candidate filed to oppose her, and she won re-election entirely unopposed.

=== Republican primary ===
==== Candidates ====
- Cynthia Lummis, incumbent State Treasurer

==== Results ====
Republican Primary results
Party	Candidate	Votes	%
Republican	Cynthia Lummis (inc.)	79,557	100.00
Total votes		79,557	100.00

=== General election ===
==== Results ====
2002 Wyoming Treasurer election
Party	Candidate	Votes	%
Republican	Cynthia Lummis (inc.)	152,583	100.00%
Total votes		152,583	
Republican hold			

Results by county Lummis: 90–100%

== Superintendent of Public Instruction ==
2002 Wyoming Superintendent of Public Instruction election
- November 5, 2002
Nominee	Trent Blankenship	Kathy Emmons
Party	Republican	Democratic
Popular vote	95,672	84,056
Percentage	53.23%	46.77%
- Blankenship: 50–60% 60–70% 70–80% Emmons: 50–60% 60–70%
Superintendent of Public Instruction before election
Judy Catchpole
Republican
Elected Superintendent of Public Instruction
Trent Blankenship
Republican

Incumbent Superintendent of Public Instruction Judy Catchpole, a Republican, could not seek re-election due to term limits. Competitive primaries developed on both sides. In the Republican primary, Trent Blankenship, the Superintendent of the Carbon County School District 1, and Jim Twiford, the former President of the State Senate emerged as early frontrunners. High school teacher Neil Waring and retired university professor John Mingle were also candidates. The Wyoming Education Association endorsed Waring in the Republican primary. The WEA criticized Twiford's legislative record, specifically pointing to millions of dollars in cuts to the education budget under his leadership.

From there, the Republican primary heated up, with Blankenship and Twiford attacking each other's records. Blankenship accused Twiford of misrepresenting his credentials and for his record in the legislature. Twiford, meanwhile, argued that Blankenship's school district "is flat broke under his leadership," with the district hemorrhaging administrators. In the end, Blankenship narrowly edged out Twiford, receiving 37% of the vote while Twiford won 33%, Waring won 20%, and Mingle won 10%.

In the Democratic primary, Kathy Emmons, the Director of the Wyoming Children's Action Alliance, emerged as the early frontrunner, earning the endorsement of the WEA. The candidates largely agreed on the issues, with all of the Democrats opposing charter schools, and with Emmons and Shoults favoring increased audits of mining companies. Hoffman ended up decisively winning the primary, winning 52% of the vote to Wiederspahn's 31% and Shoults's 17%.

In the general election, Blankenship argued that Emmons had no roots in Wyoming and had no experience in the state's public school system. Emmons disputed Blankenship's characterization, pointing out that she had worked for the Wyoming Department of Health and had run pre-school programs for developmentally disabled students throughout the state. The ideological contrasts between the candidates were not significant, however, with both Blankenship and Emmons agreeing on the need to raise teacher pay and to maintain the usage of individualized education plans, though they disagreed on the philosophy of leasing school trust lands.

Blankenship ended up narrowly beating Emmons, winning 53% of the vote to her 47%. Despite losing, she was the second-strongest performing Democrat in the 2002 elections behind Freudenthal, and managed to win in ancestrally Democratic and higher-populated areas throughout the state.

=== Democratic primary ===
==== Candidates ====
- Kathy Emmons, Director of the Wyoming Children's Action Alliance
- Richard Wiederspahn, Dildine Elementary School principal
- Christopher Shoults, high school language arts teacher

==== Results ====
Democratic Party primary results
Party	Candidate	Votes	%
Democratic	Kathy Emmons	17,312	51.77
Democratic	Richard Wiederspahn	10,393	31.08
Democratic	Christopher Shoults	5,734	17.15
Total votes		33,439	100.00

=== Republican primary ===
==== Candidates ====
- Trent Blankenship, Superintendent of the Carbon County School District 1
- Jim Twilford, former State Senate President
- Neil Waring, Glenrock High School teacher
- John Mingle, retired university professor

==== Results ====
Republican Party primary results
Party	Candidate	Votes	%
Republican	Trent Blankenship	28,162	36.50
Republican	Jim Twiford	25,629	33.22
Republican	Neil Waring	15,623	20.25
Republican	John Mingle	7,742	10.03
Total votes		77,156	100.00

=== General election ===
==== Results ====
2002 Wyoming Superintendent of Public Instruction election
Party	Candidate	Votes	%	±%
Republican	Trent Blankenship	95,672	53.23%	−4.02%
Democratic	Kathy Emmons	84,056	46.77%	+4.02%
Turnout		179,728		
Republican hold				
