= 2006 Wyoming elections =

A general election was held in the U.S. state of Wyoming on Tuesday, November 7, 2006. All of the state's executive officers—the Governor, Secretary of State, Auditor, Treasurer, and Superintendent of Public Instruction—were up for election.

== Governor ==
Incumbent Democratic Governor Dave Freudenthal sought re-election to a second term. Despite the state's strong Republican lean, Freudenthal entered the race as a heavy favorite against the Republican nominee, Ray Hunkins. Ultimately, Freudenthal won re-election in a landslide, winning 69% of the vote to Hunkins's 30%.

Wyoming gubernatorial election, 2006
Party	Candidate	Votes	%	±%
Democratic	Dave Freudenthal (incumbent)	135,516	69.99%	+20.03%
Republican	Ray Hunkins	58,100	30.01%	−17.91%
Total votes		193,616	100.00%	+37.94%
Democratic hold				

== Secretary of State ==
2006 Wyoming Secretary of State election
- November 7, 2006
Nominee	Max Maxfield	Dennis Brossman
Party	Republican	Libertarian
Popular vote	148,210	32,551
Percentage	82.0%	18.0%
- Maxfield: 50–60% 60–70% 70–80% 80–90% >90%
Secretary of State before election
Joseph Meyer
Republican
Elected Secretary of State
Max Maxfield
Republican

Incumbent Secretary of State Joe Meyer was barred from seeking a third term as Secretary of State, and instead opted to run for Treasurer. Max Maxfield, meanwhile, was term-limited from seeking a third term as Auditor and ran to succeed Meyer. He faced longtime Natrona County Clerk Mary Ann Collins in the Republican primary. The campaign between Maxfield and Collins was largely civil, with both of them touting their respective experience and Maxfield pushing back on the idea that he was playing "musical chairs" with different statewide positions. The Casper Star-Tribune endorsed Collins over Maxfield, praising her as a "capable administrator" who "will bring a valuable, fresh perspective to the secretary of state's office." It praised Maxfield for his "strong experience in management," but ultimately concluded that "Collins's specialized expertise gives her the edge in this race."

Maxfield ultimately won the Republican primary over Collins by a slim margin, winning 54% of the vote to Collins's 46%. While Collins won her home county of Natrona by 4,400 votes, along with a handful of other counties, Maxfield countered with modest wins in most of the counties in the state, enabling him to narrowly defeat her. While no Democratic candidate filed for the race, had a Democrat received at least 25 write-in votes, they could have accepted the nomination regardless. However, Collins was the only person to receive more than 25 write-in votes in the Democratic primary, and as a registered Republican who had previously run for the office, was barred from accepting the Democratic nomination. Accordingly, no Democratic candidate was listed in the race. Maxfield only faced Libertarian candidate Dennis Brossman, who had previously sought the office, in the general election.

=== Democratic primary ===
==== Candidates ====
No Democratic candidates filed.

=== Republican primary ===
==== Candidates ====
- Max Maxfield, State Auditor
- Mary Ann Collins, Natrona County Clerk

==== Results ====
Republican Primary results
Party	Candidate	Votes	%
Republican	Max Maxfield	43,531	53.81
Republican	Mary Ann Collins	37,360	46.19
Total votes		80,891	100.00

=== General election ===
==== Results ====
2006 Wyoming Secretary of State election
Party	Candidate	Votes	%	±%
Republican	Max Maxfield	148,210	81.99%	−0.45%
Libertarian	Dennis Brossman	32,551	18.01%	+0.45%
Majority		115,659	63.98%	−0.91%
Turnout		180,761		
Republican hold				

== Auditor ==
Results by county Meyer: 50–60%; 60–70%; 70–80%; 80–90%

Incumbent State Auditor Max Maxfield, unable to seek re-election to a third term, instead successfully ran for Secretary of State. In the Republican primary, Rita Meyer, a colonel in the Wyoming Air National Guard and former Governor Jim Geringer's Chief of Staff, ran against accountant Bruce Brown. Both Meyer and Brown campaigned on their financial experience, but did not significantly differ on the issues. The Casper Star-Tribune endorsed Meyer over Brown, praising her as "exceptionally qualified" and for "speak[ing] with authority about the technical details of the auditor's office," noting that she "clearly has done her homework." Meyer defeated Brown in a landslide, winning 60% of the vote to his 40%.

In the general election, Meyer was opposed by Democrat Bill Eikenberry, the former associate state director of the Bureau of Land Management. Eikenberry called for significant reform in the Auditor's office, arguing that several state programs failed to meet federal requirement, potentially endangering the funding. He initially charged that the state "has suffered serious losses due to fraudulent spending," but ultimately backed away from that assertion. The Star-Tribune once again endorsed Meyer, calling her "one of the most impressive candidates we've interviewed for any office this year" and noting that she "has had a distinguished career in public service." It suggested that Eikenberry "seems to have confused some of the duties of the state auditor with the entirely separate state Department of Audit," pointing out that the issue Eikenberry called out with federal program compliance was outside the Auditor's purview.

Meyer defeated Eikenberry in a landslide, winning 68% of the vote to Eikenberry's 32%, losing every county in the state.

=== Democratic primary ===
==== Candidates ====
- Bill Eikenberry, former Associate State Director of the Bureau of Land Management

==== Results ====
Democratic Party primary results
Party	Candidate	Votes	%
Democratic	Bill Eikenberry	24,525	100.00
Total votes		24,525	100.00

=== Republican primary ===
==== Candidates ====
- Rita Meyer, Wyoming Air National Guard Colonel, former Chief of Staff to Governor Jim Geringer
- Bruce Brown, accountant

==== Results ====
Republican Primary results
Party	Candidate	Votes	%
Republican	Rita Meyer	46,567	60.34
Republican	Bruce Brown	30,601	39.66
Total votes		77,168	100.00

=== General election ===
==== Results ====
2006 Wyoming Auditor election
Party	Candidate	Votes	%	±%
Republican	Rita Meyer	126,900	68.07%	+1.30%
Democratic	Bill Eikenberry	59,534	31.93%	−1.30%
Majority		67,366	36.13%	+2.61%
Turnout		186,434		
Republican hold				

== Treasurer ==
Results by county Meyer: 50–60%; 60–70%; 70–80%; 80–90%

Incumbent Republican Secretary of State Cynthia Lummis was barred from seeking a third term due to term limits. Accordingly, term-limited Secretary of State Joe Meyer and former State House Speaker Fred Parady ran to succeed Lummis in the Republican primary. The campaign between Meyer and Parady was largely civil, though they disagreed on the need for a state investment board, which Meyer supported and Parady opposed. In the closing days of the campaign, Meyer was endorsed by Vice-president Dick Cheney, an old friend and former roommate of his, and by the Casper Star-Tribune. The Star-Tribune praised Meyer's "practical approach to solving problems" and "common-sense approach that seeks what's best for Wyoming." Though it praised Parady's ideas and expressed optimism that "he'll run for another state office" in the future, "the state needs Meyer's experience and leadership."

Meyer defeated Parady by a wide margin, winning 63% of the vote to Parady's 37%, winning in every county of the state except for Sweetwater County, which Parady represented in the legislature. In the general election, Meyer faced Democratic nominee Ron Redo, a former state employee who had previously run as the Democratic nominee for Treasurer in 1990. Redo attacked Meyer for voting to invest state funds in private equity, which he argued was risky, and campaigned on increasing mineral taxes. The Star-Tribune once again endorsed Meyer, praising him as "eminently qualified" and for his "innovative idea[s]." It noted that Redo was "sincere in his desire to protect the state's funds, and has raised some legitimate concerns about the standards used by the state to evaluate the performance of its investment managers," but "Meyer inspires more confidence in his ability to manage the office effectively." Ultimately, Meyer overwhelmingly defeated Redo, receiving 73% of the vote to Redo's 27%, winning every county in the state and receiving the highest vote total of any Republican candidate.

=== Democratic primary ===
==== Candidates ====
- Ron Redo, former state worker, 1990 Democratic nominee for Treasurer

==== Results ====
Democratic Party primary results
Party	Candidate	Votes	%
Democratic	Ron Redo	23,766	100.00
Total votes		23,766	100.00

=== Republican primary ===
==== Candidates ====
- Joe Meyer, Secretary of State
- Fred Parady, former Speaker of the Wyoming House of Representatives

==== Results ====
Republican Primary results
Party	Candidate	Votes	%
Republican	Joe Meyer	49,300	63.24
Republican	Fred Parady	28,654	36.76
Total votes		77,954	100.00

=== General election ===
==== Results ====
2006 Wyoming Treasurer election
Party	Candidate	Votes	%	±%
Republican	Joe Meyer	134,822	72.72%	−27.28%
Democratic	Ron Redo	50,575	27.28%	+27.28%
Majority		84,247	45.44%	−54.56%
Turnout		185,397		
Republican hold				

== Superintendent of Public Instruction ==
Results by county McBride: 50–60%; 60–70%; 70–80%; Hoffman: 50–60%; 60–70%

Two years into his four-year term, State Superintendent Trent Blankenship resigned from office to accept an appointment as the superintendent of schools in Barrow, Alaska. The Republican Party, pursuant to state law, nominated three candidates as Blankenship's replacement, and Governor Dave Freudenthal appointed Jim McBride, the former president the Community College of the Air Force and the technology director for the state department of education. In 2006, McBride opted to run for re-election. He won the Republican primary unopposed and was opposed by Michelle Hoffman, the Superintendent of the Fremont County School District 14, who won the Democratic primary unopposed.

In the general election, Hoffman, a special education teacher, argued that McBride "does not understand special education issues," pointing to cuts that he allegedly made in the state's special education office in Riverton. She was unable to make the attack land, however, with a poll the week before the election showing her losing to McBride, 45-26%. The Casper Star-Tribune also endorsed McBride for re-election, arguing that he "deserves to be elected to a full term to continue the work he has begun." It argued that he "brought stability to the department and put the employees on the same page." And while the Star-Tribune praised Hoffman's teaching experience as "a plus, as it gives her an understanding of problems teachers encounter and ideas about solutions," it criticized her opposition to merit pay for teachers and for paying students for higher test scores.

Ultimately, McBride won a full term over Hoffman by a solid margin, winning 59% of the vote to her 41%. However, Hoffman delivered the strongest performance by a statewide Democratic candidate other than Governor Freudenthal, winning Albany County, Fremont County, Sweetwater County, and Teton County, which no Democratic candidate other than Freudenthal and Hoffman won.

=== Democratic primary ===
==== Candidates ====
- Michelle Hoffman, Superintendent of the Fremont County School District 14

==== Results ====
Democratic Party primary results
Party	Candidate	Votes	%
Democratic	Michelle Hoffman	24,930	100.00
Total votes		24,930	100.00

=== Republican primary ===
==== Candidates ====
- Jim McBride, incumbent Superintendent of Public Instruction

==== Results ====
Republican Party primary results
Party	Candidate	Votes	%
Republican	Jim McBride (inc.)	70,230	100.00
Total votes		70,230	100.00

=== General election ===
==== Results ====
2006 Wyoming Superintendent of Public Instruction election
Party	Candidate	Votes	%	±%
Republican	Jim McBride (inc.)	108,705	58.54%	+5.31%
Democratic	Michelle L. Hoffman	76,978	41.46%	−5.31%
Turnout		185,683		
Republican hold				
