= Douglas Moore (disambiguation) =

Douglas Moore (1893–1969) was an American composer, educator, and author.

Douglas Moore may also refer to:

- Doug Moore (1939–2016), Canadian politician
- Douglas Moore (American politician)
- Douglas E. Moore (1928–2019), American minister and civil rights activist
- Douglas Moore (1948–1969), U.S. Army soldier killed in the Vietnam War, the namesake of Moore Army Airfield
- Douglas Moore (football manager), English former manager of the Singapore national football team
- Douglas R. Moore, 9th president of Minnesota State University, Mankato
