= Jene =

Jene is a given name. Notable people with the name include:

- Bobbi Jene Smith
- Jene Golovchenko
- Jene Jansen
- Jene Newsome
- Jené Morris
- Jene Vickrey

== See also ==
- Jane (disambiguation)
- Gene
- Jena
- Jene, trade name for Ethinylestradiol/cyproterone acetate
