= Karen Wheeler (politician) =

American politician

Secretary of State of Wyoming Acting
- In office February 9, 2018 – March 1, 2018
- Governor: Matt Mead
- Preceded by: Ed Murray
- Succeeded by: Edward Buchanan

Personal details
- Political party: Republican
- Education: University of Wyoming (BA)

Karen Wheeler (born in Cheyenne, Wyoming) is Wyoming politician who served as Acting Secretary of State of Wyoming between February 9, 2018, and March 1, 2018. She is a member of Republican Party.

== About ==
She was born in Cheyenne and graduated from University of Wyoming. She has worked in the Secretary of State's Office for 31 years, including 7 years as Director of the Compliance Division. She became deputy director in 2015, responsible for planning, budget, personnel, staff development and oversight of service to the public. After the resignation of secretary Ed Murray amid scandal, she became his successor in 2018.

She is married and has children.
