= Wyoming's 60th House of Representatives district =

American legislative district

Wyoming's 60th State House of Representatives district
- Wyoming's 60th House of Representatives district as of 2022
Representative
Marlene Brady; R–Green River
- Demographics: 84% White; 14% Hispanic; 1% Asian; 1% Other; 1% Multiracial
- Population (2022): 8,537

Wyoming's 60th House of Representatives district is one of 62 districts in the Wyoming House of Representatives. The district encompasses part of Sweetwater County. It is represented by Republican Representative Marlene Brady of Green River.

In 1992, the state of Wyoming switched from electing state legislators by county to a district-based system.

== List of members representing the district ==
Representative	Party	Term	Note
Louise Ryckman	Democratic	1993–2001	Elected in 1992. Re-elected in 1994. Re-elected in 1996. Re-elected in 1998.
Bill Thompson	Democratic	2001–2011	Elected in 2000. Re-elected in 2002. Re-elected in 2004. Re-elected in 2006. Re-elected in 2008.
John Freeman	Democratic	2011–2021	Elected in 2010. Re-elected in 2012. Re-elected in 2014. Re-elected in 2016. Re-elected in 2018.
Mark Baker	Republican	2021–2023	Elected in 2020.
Tony Niemiec	Republican	2023–2025	Elected in 2022.
Marlene Brady	Republican	2025 – present	Elected in 2024.

== Recent election results ==
=== 2014 ===
House district 60 general election
Party	Candidate	Votes	%
Democratic	John Freeman (incumbent)	1,518	55.26%
Republican	Bill Hooley	1,229	44.73%
Total votes		2,747	100.0%
Invalid or blank votes		76	
Democratic hold			

=== 2016 ===
House district 60 general election
Party	Candidate	Votes	%
Democratic	John Freeman (incumbent)	3,088	96.37%
Write-ins		116	3.62%
Total votes		3,204	100.0%
Invalid or blank votes		938	
Democratic hold			

=== 2018 ===
House district 60 general election
Party	Candidate	Votes	%
Democratic	John Freeman (incumbent)	2,208	95.50%
Write-ins		104	4.49%
Total votes		2,312	100.0%
Invalid or blank votes		777	
Democratic hold			

=== 2020 ===
House district 60 general election
Party	Candidate	Votes	%
Republican	Mark Baker	2,793	68.79%
Democratic	Lindsey Travis	1,260	31.03%
Write-ins		7	0.17%
Total votes		4,060	100.0%
Invalid or blank votes		124	
Republican gain from Democratic			

=== 2022 ===
House district 60 general election
Party	Candidate	Votes	%
Republican	Tony Niemiec	2,178	98.19%
Write-ins		40	1.80%
Total votes		2,218	100.0%
Invalid or blank votes		465	
Republican hold			

=== 2024 ===
House district 60 general election
Party	Candidate	Votes	%
Republican	Marlene Brady	2,484	71.37%
Democratic	Carmen Whitehead	951	27.32%
Write-ins		45	1.29%
Total votes		3,480	100.0%
Invalid or blank votes		204	
Republican hold			

== Historical district boundaries ==
Map	Description	Apportionment Plan	Notes
	Sweetwater County (part)	1992 Apportionment Plan	
	Sweetwater County (part)	2002 Apportionment Plan	
	Sweetwater County (part)	2012 Apportionment Plan	
