= Cindy Hill =

Cindy Hill may refer to:

- Cindy Hill (golfer)
- Cindy Hill (politician)
