= Samuel Shannon =

Samuel Shannon may refer to:

- Samuel D. Shannon (1834–1896), American soldier and politician in the Wyoming Territory
- Samuel Leonard Shannon (1816–1895), lawyer, judge and political figure in Nova Scotia, Canada
