= Jeremy Haroldson =

American politician and pastor

Speaker pro tempore of the Wyoming House of Representatives
- Incumbent
- Assumed office January 14, 2025
- Preceded by: Clark Stith

Member of the Wyoming House of Representatives from the 4th district
- Incumbent
- Assumed office January 12, 2021
- Preceded by: Dan Kirkbride

Personal details
- Party: Republican
- Education: Bismarck State College (attended); Global University (attended)
- Website: Campaign website

Jeremy Haroldson is an American politician and Republican member of the Wyoming House of Representatives, representing the 4th district since January 12, 2021.

== Career ==
Haroldson serves as lead pastor for Impact Ministries, an Assemblies of God affiliated Pentecostal church. Haroldson serves as chairman of the Platte County Chamber of Commerce. On August 18, 2020, Haroldson defeated incumbent state representative, Dan Kirkbride, in the Republican primary for the Wyoming House of Representatives seat representing the 4th district. On November 3, 2020, Haroldson was elected to this position, unopposed. Haroldson is set to be sworn in on January 4, 2021.

== Personal life ==
Haroldson lives in Wheatland, Wyoming.

Wyoming House of Representatives
Preceded by Clark Stith	Speaker pro tempore of the Wyoming House of Representatives; 2025–present	Incumbent
