= Wyoming's 31st House of Representatives district =

American legislative district

Wyoming's 31st State House of Representatives district
- Wyoming's 31st House of Representatives district as of 2022
Representative
John Bear; R–Gillette
- Demographics: 77% White; 15% Hispanic; 7% Multiracial
- Population (2022): 9,432

Wyoming's 31st House of Representatives district is one of 62 districts in the Wyoming House of Representatives. The district encompasses part of Campbell County. It is represented by Republican Representative John Bear of Gillette.

In 1992, the state of Wyoming switched from electing state legislators by county to a district-based system.

== List of members representing the district ==
Representative	Party	Term	Note
John Hines	Republican	1993 – 2003	Elected in 1992. Re-elected in 1994. Re-elected in 1996. Re-elected in 1998. Re-elected in 2000.
Jene Jansen	Republican	2003 – 2004	Elected in 2002. Resigned in 2004.
Tom Lubnau	Republican	2004 – 2015	Appointed in 2004. Re-elected in 2004. Re-elected in 2006. Re-elected in 2008. Re-elected in 2010. Re-elected in 2012.
Scott Clem	Republican	2015 – 2021	Elected in 2014. Re-elected in 2016. Re-elected in 2018.
John Bear	Republican	2021 – present	Elected in 2020. Re-elected in 2022. Re-elected in 2024.
Douglas Moore	Republican	2027 – member-elect	Elected in 2026.

== Recent election results ==
=== 2014 ===
House district 31 general election
Party	Candidate	Votes	%
Republican	Scott Clem	1,577	78.65%
Democratic	Billy Montgomery	425	21.19%
Write-ins		3	0.14%
Total votes		2,005	100.0%
Invalid or blank votes		112	
Republican hold			

=== 2016 ===
House district 31 general election
Party	Candidate	Votes	%
Republican	Scott Clem (Incumbent)	3,315	88.21%
Democratic	Dylan Czarnecki	431	11.46%
Write-ins		12	0.31%
Total votes		3,758	100.0%
Invalid or blank votes		225	
Republican hold			

=== 2018 ===
House district 31 general election
Party	Candidate	Votes	%
Republican	Scott Clem (Incumbent)	1,826	68.98%
Independent	Dave Hardesty	814	30.75%
Write-ins		7	0.26%
Total votes		2,647	100.0%
Invalid or blank votes		86	
Republican hold			

=== 2020 ===
House district 31 general election
Party	Candidate	Votes	%
Republican	John Bear	3,866	97.40%
Write-ins		103	2.59%
Total votes		3,969	100.0%
Invalid or blank votes		400	
Republican hold			

=== 2022 ===
House district 31 general election
Party	Candidate	Votes	%
Republican	John Bear (Incumbent)	1,831	97.39%
Write-ins		49	2.60%
Total votes		1,880	100.0%
Invalid or blank votes		284	
Republican hold			

=== 2024 ===
House district 31 general election
Party	Candidate	Votes	%
Republican	John Bear (Incumbent)	2,726	95.91%
Write-ins		116	4.08%
Total votes		2,842	100.0%
Invalid or blank votes		538	
Republican hold			

== Historical district boundaries ==
Map	Description	Apportionment Plan	Notes
	Campbell County (part)	1992 Apportionment Plan	
	Campbell County (part)	2002 Apportionment Plan	
	Campbell County (part)	2012 Apportionment Plan	
