= Tom Lubnau =

American politician and lawyer

Thomas E. Lubnau II

Member of the Wyoming House of Representatives from the 31st district
- In office August 2004 – January 5, 2015
- Preceded by: Jene Jansen
- Succeeded by: Scott Clem

62nd Speaker of the Wyoming House of Representatives
- In office January 8, 2013 – January 13, 2015
- Preceded by: Edward Buchanan
- Succeeded by: Kermit Brown

Majority Leader of the Wyoming House of Representatives
- In office January 2011 – December 2012
- Preceded by: Edward Buchanan
- Succeeded by: Kermit Brown

Personal details
- Born: December 12, 1958 Laramie, Wyoming, U.S.
- Party: Republican
- Spouse: Rita Lubnau
- Children: 2
- Occupation: Attorney

Thomas E. Lubnau II (born December 12, 1958) is an American politician and lawyer who served as Speaker of the Wyoming House of Representatives from 2013 to 2015. He served District 31 as a representative in the House from 2004 to 2015 as a member of the Republican Party.

== Early career ==
Lubnau served as president of the Wyoming State Bar in 2002 – 2003. Prior to that, he was president-elect (2001–2002), vice-president (2000–2001) and bar commissioner (1997–2000).

== Tenure in the Wyoming House ==
Initially, Lubnau was appointed to the Wyoming House by the Campbell County Commission in August 2004, following Jene Jansen's resignation.

Prior to his speakership, Lubnau was the House Speaker Pro Tempore in 2007 and 2008 and the House Majority Leader in 2011 and 2012. He is a graduate of the University of Wyoming in his native Laramie, with both a bachelor's and a Juris Doctor degrees in 1981 and 1984, respectively. He is affiliated with Rotary International. Lubnau and his wife, Rita, have two children. He is Episcopalian.

Lubnau is the first House Speaker from Campbell County since Republican Cliff H. Davis, who served in 1973 and 1974.

=== Leadership of the impeachment inquiry ===
In the summer of 2013, Lubnau called for a still pending investigation into allegations that Cindy Hill, a fellow Republican, but with Tea Party movement support, had misused her office as state superintendent of public instruction and created a "pillow fort." The investigating committee could recommend that the full House launch impeachment proceedings against Hill. Were impeachment approved, Hill would, if convicted in an impeachment trial in the Wyoming Senate, be required to vacate her position. No deadline has been set for the committee to complete its work.

| Preceded by Jene Jansen | Wyoming State Representative from Campbell County; 2004–2015 | Succeeded by Scott Clem |
| Preceded by Edward Buchanan | Wyoming House Majority Leader; 2011–2012 | Succeeded by Kermit Brown |
| Preceded by Edward Buchanan | Speaker of the Wyoming House of Representatives; 2013–2015 | Succeeded by Kermit Brown |
