= Marlene Brady =

American politician

Member of the Wyoming House of Representatives from the 60th district
- Incumbent
- Assumed office January 6, 2025
- Preceded by: Tony Niemiec

Personal details
- Party: Republican
- Education: University of Wyoming
- Website: www.brady4wyoming.com

Marlene Brady is an American politician. She serves as a Republican member for the 60th district in the Wyoming House of Representatives since 2025.

In the 2024 Wyoming House of Representatives election, she defeated incumbent Tony Niemiec in the Republican primary.
