= Bill Thompson (Wyoming politician) =

American politician

Member of the Wyoming House of Representatives from the 60th district
- In office January 9, 2001 – January 11, 2001
- Preceded by: Louise Ryckman
- Succeeded by: John Freeman

Personal details
- Born: William Leigh Thompson; August 11, 1937 Casper, Wyoming, U.S.
- Died: June 21, 2018 (aged 80) Green River, Wyoming, U.S.
- Party: Democratic
- Spouse: Rita Gottman Thompson
- Profession: Educator

William Leigh Thompson (August 11, 1937 – June 21, 2018) was a Democratic member of the Wyoming House of Representatives, representing the 60th district from 2001 until his retirement in 2011.

== Background ==
Thompson was born in Casper, Wyoming and went to Wyoming Midwest High School. He received his associated degree from Casper College. Thompson also received his bachelor's degree from the University of Wyoming and his master's degree from Utah State University. Thompson was a teacher at the Green River High School, the Sweetwater County School District Number 2, from 1961 until 1996.

== Political career ==
When incumbent Democratic Representative Louise Ryckman announced her retirement, Thompson ran unopposed in the Democratic primary and was elected with 62.9% of the vote. Thompson served as House Minority Whip between 2003 and 2007. He was reelected four more times before announcing his retirement in 2011, and was succeeded by fellow educator and Democrat John Freeman.

== Death ==
Thompson died on June 21, 2018, in Green River, Wyoming at the age of 80.
