= Mark O. Harris =

American politician

Member of the Wyoming Senate from the 14th district
- In office January 4, 1993 – December 11, 2002
- Preceded by: District created
- Succeeded by: Larry Caller

Member of the Wyoming House of Representatives from the Sweetwater County district
- In office January 2, 1989 – January 4, 1993

Personal details
- Born: November 26, 1950 (age 75)
- Party: Democratic
- Education: Albuquerque Technical Vocational Institute; University of Albuquerque (B.A.)
- Profession: Electrician

Mark O. Harris (born November 26, 1950) is a Democratic politician from the state of Wyoming who served in the Wyoming Legislature from 1989 to 2002. From 1989 to 1993, Harris represented Sweetwater County in the State House, and from 1993 until his resignation in 2002, he represented the 14th District in the State Senate. Harris was the 2002 Democratic nominee for State Auditor, losing to Republican incumbent Max Maxfield.

== Background ==
Harris attended the Albuquerque Technical Vocational Institute, receiving a technical degree, and the University of Albuquerque, where he graduated with a bachelor's degree in university studies. Harris worked as an electrician prior to the start of his political career; he worked as an underground electrician at General Chemical Green River Soda Ash Operations. In 1986, Harris ran for Clerk of the Sweetwater County District Court, but lost to incumbent Clerk Donald Brown in the Democratic primary.

== House of Representatives ==
In 1988, Harris announced that he would run for one of Sweetwater County's five seats in the State House, arguing that the Republican majority in the state legislature had priorities inconsistent with the needs of the working class. "When they can spend a quarter of a million dollars to dig an irrigation ditch on one ranch and then turn around and cut funding educational programs that help provide reading materials to visually-handicapped students, something is wrong." Harris, along with the other four Democratic candidates, ended up winning the election unopposed, as no Republicans filed to run for State House in the county. He ran for re-election in 1990, arguing that "the average working person needs a voice in the Legislature." Only one Republican, Jay Lyon, challenged the county's five Democratic state legislators. Owing to the reliably Democratic voting behavior of Sweetwater County, Harris and the county's other Democratic legislators were all re-elected.

In the legislature, Harris had a mostly liberal voting record. During his first term in the House, Harris strongly supported efforts to create a state holiday to honor Martin Luther King Jr. The Republican majority in the legislature voted down the proposed holiday, even after Harris and others backed a compromise to renamed the proposed holiday "Equality Day." He repeatedly pushed to legalize video gambling in the state, and successfully moved to enact new liability protections for hunters. On several occasions, however, Harris differed from the Democratic line; though he was pro-choice, he supported an effort to require parental consent if minors sought abortions, strongly supported gun rights, and opposed a Democratic effort to reform the election code.

== State Senate ==
Following a successful legal challenge to Wyoming's method of electing state legislators in multi-member county-based districts, the state redrew its legislative districts in advance of the 1992 election. Harris wound up in House District 39, based in Green River and other communities in southwestern Sweetwater County. Relatedly, Democratic State Senators Bob Reese and John Fanos were drawn into Senate District 14, which included western Sweetwater County and Bridger Valley in northeastern Uinta County. After both Fanos and Reese declined to run for re-election, Harris opted to run for the State Senate instead of seeking a third term in the House. Harris faced no opposition in his campaign and won his first term in the State Senate unopposed. He was re-elected to his second term in 1996 and to his third term in 2000 without opposition.

== 2002 State Auditor campaign ==
In 2002, Harris announced that he would run for State Auditor, challenging Republican State Auditor Max Maxfield for re-election. In launching his campaign, he also announced that he would be retiring from his State Senate seat two years before the end of his term. He attacked Maxfield for mismanaging the office, drawing attention to a data breach and the subsequent awarding of a no-bid security contract to a Virginia-based company. He also won the endorsement of the NRA Political Victory Fund, which gave him an A+ rating as a candidate for his long history of gun rights advocacy. However, despite Harris's aggressive campaign, and the favorable environment for Democrats with the strong performance of gubernatorial nominee Dave Freudenthal, Harris lost to Maxfield in a landslide, winning just 33% of the vote to Maxfield's 67%.

Harris resigned from his State Senate seat, in order to run for Auditor and was replaced by State Senator Larry Caller.
