= Karl Allred =

American politician

23rd Secretary of State of Wyoming
- In office October 3, 2022 – January 2, 2023
- Governor: Mark Gordon
- Preceded by: Edward Buchanan
- Succeeded by: Chuck Gray

Personal details
- Political party: Republican

Karl Allred is an American politician who served as the Secretary of State of Wyoming. He was appointed by Wyoming governor Mark Gordon in September 2022 to replace Edward Buchanan, who resigned on September 15 to become a Goshen County district court judge. He is a member of the Republican Party.

== Political career ==
Allred has unsuccessfully run for the Wyoming Legislature in 2010, 2014, and 2022. He was a member of the electoral college from Wyoming in 2016 and 2020.

After the resignation on September 15, 2022, of Wyoming Secretary of State Edward Buchanan, governor Mark Gordon was required to choose from three candidates nominated by the Wyoming Republican Party's Central Committee. The committee nominated Allred along with Marti Halverson, president of Right to Life of Wyoming, and Bryan Miller, the chairman of the Sheridan County Republican Party. Gordon selected Allred after interviewing the three candidates.

== Personal life ==
Allred lives in Uinta County.

== Electoral history ==
2020 Wyoming's 19th House of Representatives district Republican primary election
Party	Candidate	Votes	%
Republican	Danny Eyre	1,219	60.14%
Republican	Karl Allred	802	39.57%
Write-in		6	0.29%
Total votes		2,027	100%

2022 Wyoming's 19th House of Representatives district Republican primary election
Party	Candidate	Votes	%
Republican	Jon Conrad	1,078	43.54%
Republican	Karl Allred	752	30.37%
Republican	Andy Stocks	638	25.77%
Write-in		8	0.32%
Total votes		2,476	100%

Political offices
Preceded by Edward Buchanan	Secretary of State of Wyoming; Acting; 2022–2023	Succeeded by Chuck Gray
