= Wyoming's 4th House of Representatives district =

American legislative district

Wyoming's 4th State House of Representatives district
- Wyoming's 4th House of Representatives district as of 2022
Representative
Jeremy Haroldson; R–Wheatland
- Demographics: 86% White; 8% Hispanic; 5% Multiracial
- Population (2022): 8,726

Wyoming's 4th House of Representatives district is one of 62 districts in the Wyoming House of Representatives. The district encompasses Platte County and part of Laramie County. It is represented by Republican Representative Jeremy Haroldson of Wheatland.

In 1992, the state of Wyoming switched from electing state legislators by county to a district-based system.

== List of members representing the district ==
Representative	Party	Term	Note
Doug Chamberlain	Republican	1993 – 1995	Elected in 1992.
Roger Huckfeldt	Republican	1995 – 2003	Elected in 1994. Re-elected in 1996. Re-elected in 1998. Re-elected in 2000.
Edward Buchanan	Republican	2003 – 2013	Elected in 2002. Re-elected in 2004. Re-elected in 2006. Re-elected in 2008. Re-elected in 2010.
Dan Kirkbride	Republican	2013 – 2021	Elected in 2012. Re-elected in 2014. Re-elected in 2016. Re-elected in 2018.
Jeremy Haroldson	Republican	2021 – present	Elected in 2020. Re-elected in 2022. Re-elected in 2024.

== Recent election results ==
=== 2014 ===
House district 4 general election
Party	Candidate	Votes	%
Republican	Dan Kirkbride (Incumbent)	3,326	98.54%
Write-ins		49	1.45%
Total votes		3,375	100.0%
Invalid or blank votes		648	
Republican hold			

=== 2016 ===
House district 4 general election
Party	Candidate	Votes	%
Republican	Dan Kirkbride (Incumbent)	3,652	74.91%
Constitution	Joe Michaels	1,185	24.30%
Write-ins		38	0.77%
Total votes		4,875	100.0%
Invalid or blank votes		308	
Republican hold			

=== 2018 ===
House district 4 general election
Party	Candidate	Votes	%
Republican	Dan Kirkbride (Incumbent)	3,645	97.98%
Write-ins		75	2.01%
Total votes		3,720	100.0%
Invalid or blank votes		582	
Republican hold			

=== 2020 ===
House district 4 general election
Party	Candidate	Votes	%
Republican	Jeremy Haroldson	4,227	85.89%
Write-ins		694	14.10%
Total votes		4,921	100.0%
Invalid or blank votes		697	
Republican hold			

=== 2022 ===
House district 4 general election
Party	Candidate	Votes	%
Republican	Jeremy Haroldson (Incumbent)	2,539	63.30%
Independent	Dan Brecht	1,436	35.80%
Write-ins		36	0.89%
Total votes		4,011	100.0%
Invalid or blank votes		90	
Republican hold			

=== 2024 ===
House district 4 general election
Party	Candidate	Votes	%
Republican	Jeremy Haroldson (Incumbent)	3,516	76.26%
Democratic	Charles Randolph	1,014	21.99%
Write-ins		80	1.73%
Total votes		4,610	100.0%
Invalid or blank votes		286	
Republican hold			

== Historical district boundaries ==
Map	Description	Apportionment Plan	Notes
	Goshen County (part)	1992 Apportionment Plan	
	Goshen County (part)	2002 Apportionment Plan	
	Platte County; Converse County (part)	2012 Apportionment Plan	
