= Roger Huckfeldt =

American politician

Member of the Wyoming House of Representatives from the 4th district
- In office January 10, 1995 – January 14, 2003
- Preceded by: Doug Chamberlain
- Succeeded by: Edward Buchanan

Personal details
- Born: August 22, 1958 (age 67) Torrington, Wyoming
- Party: Republican

Roger Huckfeldt (born August 22, 1958) is an American politician who served in the Wyoming House of Representatives from the 4th district from 1995 to 2003.
