= Marty Martin (Wyoming politician) =

American politician

Member of the Wyoming Senate from the 12th district
- In office January 5, 2009 – January 7, 2013
- Preceded by: Rae Lynn Job
- Succeeded by: Bernadine Craft

Member of the Wyoming House of Representatives from the 48th district
- In office January 6, 2003 – January 5, 2009
- Preceded by: Bud Nelson
- Succeeded by: Joseph M. Barbuto

Member of the Rock Springs City Council from Ward 3
- In office January 7, 1997 – June 9, 1999
- Preceded by: Rudy Magagna
- Succeeded by: Kathy Gilbert

Personal details
- Born: August 5, 1951 (age 74) Truth or Consequences, New Mexico, U.S.
- Party: Democratic
- Spouse: Nema
- Profession: Production Foreman

Marty Martin (born August 5, 1951) is a former Democratic member of the Wyoming Senate, representing the 12th district from 2009 until 2013. He previously served in the Wyoming House of Representatives representing the 48th district from 2003 to 2009, including a stint as Minority Leader.

== Career ==
Prior to serving in the state legislature, Martin was a Rock Springs City Councilman. He succeeded retiring City Councilman Rudy Magagna, and served until his resignation in June 1999.

== Elections ==
=== 2002 ===
After incumbent Democratic Representative Bud Nelson announced his retirement, Martin declared his candidacy. He ran unopposed in the Democratic primary and defeated Republican attorney Clark Stith with 55% of the vote.

=== 2004 ===
Martin ran unopposed in both the primary and general elections.

=== 2006 ===
Martin ran unopposed in both the primary and general elections.

=== 2008 ===
After incumbent Democratic Senator Rae Lynn Job announced her retirement, Martin declared his candidacy for the seat. Martin ran unopposed in both the primary and general elections. Job then resigned early and Martin was appointed to fill the remainder of Job's unexpired term, though he was sworn in on the same date as other state legislators.

=== 2012 ===
Martin declined to seek reelection, and was succeeded by Democratic State Representative Bernadine Craft.
