= John Bear (politician) =

American politician and businessman

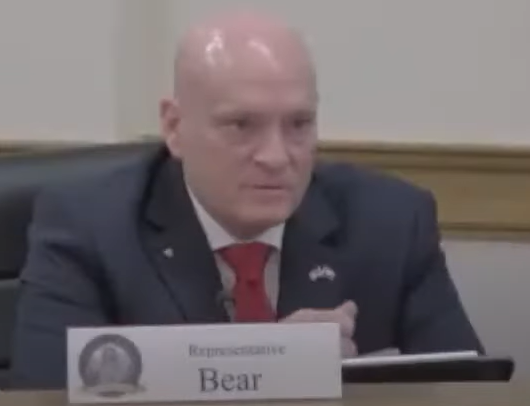
- Bear in 2023

Member of the Wyoming House of Representatives from the 31st district
- Incumbent
- Assumed office January 4, 2021
- Preceded by: Scott Clem
- Succeeded by: Douglas Moore (elect)

Personal details
- Born: Trenton, Missouri, U.S.
- Party: Republican
- Education: University of Colorado, Boulder (BA)

Military service
- Allegiance: United States
- Branch/service: United States Navy
- Bear's voice Bear during a House Revenue Committee session. Recorded February 23, 2023

John W. Bear is an American politician and businessman serving as a Republican member of the Wyoming House of Representatives from the 31st district. Elected in November 2020, he took office on January 4, 2021.

== Biography ==
Bear was born in Trenton, Missouri. In 1988, he graduated from the University of Colorado Boulder with a Bachelor of Arts in economics and participated in the Naval Reserve Officers Training Corps. Upon graduation, he became an officer in the United States Navy and served in the Pacific Fleet. While in the U.S. Navy, he was an electrical and auxiliaries officer and a gunnery officer.

Since 2007, he has been the owner of Bear's Dry Cleaners. In early-2020, state representative Scott Clem announced that he would be retiring from the legislature. Bear then announced his candidacy and was endorsed by Clem. He defeated Micky Shober in the Republican primary for District 31 on August 18, 2020, and won the general election on November 3, 2020. Bear took office on January 4, 2021. He serves on the House Minerals, Business and Economic Development Committee.
