= John Freeman (Wyoming politician) =

American politician (born 1954)

Member of the Wyoming House of Representatives from the 60th district
- In office January 11, 2011 – January 4, 2021
- Preceded by: Bill Thompson
- Succeeded by: Mark Baker

Personal details
- Born: September 10, 1954 (age 72)
- Party: Democratic
- Education: Western Wyoming Community College; University of Wyoming

John L. Freeman (born September 10, 1954) is an American politician and former Wyoming state legislator. A member of the Democratic Party, Freeman represented the 60th district in the Wyoming House of Representatives from 2011 to 2021.

== Early life and education ==
John L. Freeman was born on September 10, 1954. In 1972, he graduated from Rock Springs High School. In 1975, he graduated from Western Wyoming Community College with an associates of arts degree and graduated from University of Wyoming with a Bachelor of Arts in history in 1978. He married Theresa Collins, with whom he had three children.

== Wyoming House of Representatives ==
In 2010, Freeman won the Democratic nomination for a seat in the Wyoming House of Representatives from the 60th district without opposition and defeated Republican nominee Ted York in the general election to succeed Bill Thompson. He won reelection in 2012, 2014, 2016, and 2018. Freeman announced that he would not seek reelection in 2020.

In 2010, Freeman was selected to serve on the education committee in the Wyoming House of Representatives. Freeman has served as chairman of the Wyoming House of Representatives Minority Caucus since 2017. During the 2020 presidential election Freeman endorsed Joe Biden for the Democratic presidential nomination.

== Electoral history ==
John Freeman electoral history

2010 Wyoming House of Representatives 60th district election
Primary election
Party	Candidate	Votes	%
Democratic	John Freeman	737	99.73%
Write-in		2	0.27%
Total votes		739	100.00%
	Undervote	131	
General election
Democratic	John Freeman	1,636	60.39%
Republican	Ted York	1,070	39.50%
Write-in		3	0.11%
Total votes		2,709	100.00%
	Undervote	91	

2012 Wyoming House of Representatives 60th district election
Primary election
Party	Candidate	Votes	%
Democratic	John Freeman (incumbent)	566	98.95%
Write-in		6	1.05%
Total votes		572	100.00%
	Undervote	45	
General election
Democratic	John Freeman (incumbent)	3,199	97.44%
Write-in		84	2.56%
Total votes		3,283	100.00%
	Undervote	826	

2014 Wyoming House of Representatives 60th district election
Primary election
Party	Candidate	Votes	%
Democratic	John Freeman (incumbent)	614	99.51%
Write-in		3	0.49%
Total votes		617	100.00%
	Undervote	66	
General election
Democratic	John Freeman (incumbent)	1,518	55.26%
Republican	Bill Hooley	1,229	44.74%
Total votes		2,747	100.00%
	Undervote	72	
	Overvote	4	

2016 Wyoming House of Representatives 60th district election
Primary election
Party	Candidate	Votes	%
Democratic	John Freeman (incumbent)	647	99.23%
Write-in		5	0.77%
Total votes		652	100.00%
	Undervote	45	
General election
Democratic	John Freeman (incumbent)	3,088	96.38%
Write-in		116	3.62%
Total votes		3,204	100.00%
	Undervote	938	

2018 Wyoming House of Representatives 60th district election
Primary election
Party	Candidate	Votes	%
Democratic	John Freeman (incumbent)	550	99.82%
Write-in		1	0.18%
Total votes		551	100.00%
	Undervote	50	
General election
Democratic	John Freeman (incumbent)	2,208	95.50%
Write-in		104	4.50%
Total votes		2,312	100.00%
	Undervote	777	
