= Scott Clem =

Member of the Wyoming House of Representatives

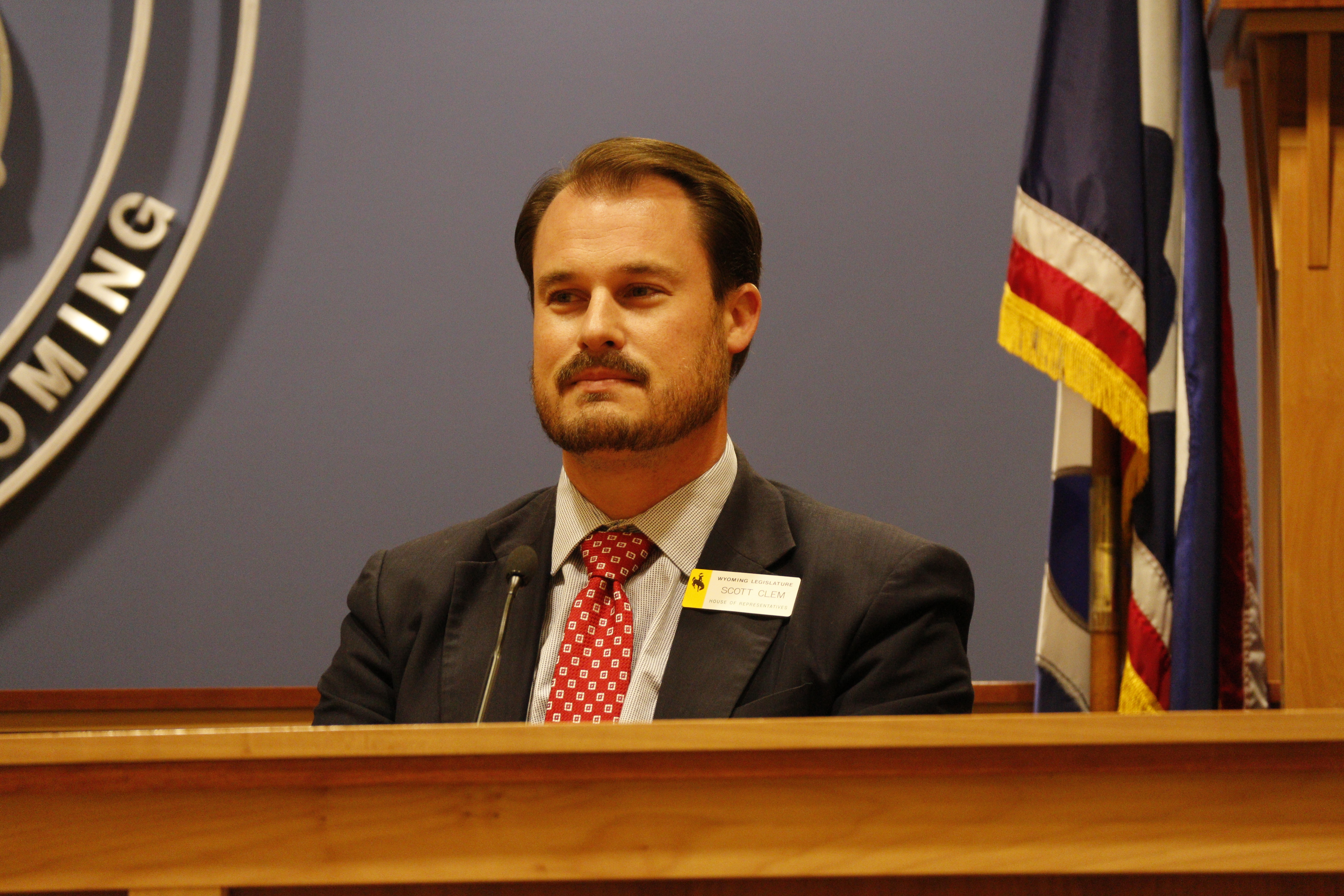
- Scott Clem at Campbell County League of Women Voters' General Election Candidates' Forum in Gillette, Wyoming

Member of the Wyoming House of Representatives from the 31st district
- In office January 5, 2015 – January 4, 2021
- Preceded by: Tom Lubnau
- Succeeded by: John Bear

Personal details
- Born: April 6, 1984 (age 42)
- Party: Republican
- Spouse: Chelsie Clem
- Children: 4
- Education: Sheridan College
- Profession: Case Manager

Scott Clem (born April 6, 1984) is an American politician who served as a Republican member of the Wyoming House of Representatives from the 31st district from 2015 to 2021.

== Elections ==
=== 2014 ===
After incumbent Republican Representative and Speaker of the House Tom Lubnau announced his retirement, Clem announced his candidacy. He defeated Brenda Schladweiler in the Republican primary and then defeated Democratic candidate Billy Montgomery in the general election, 79% to 21%.

=== 2016 ===
Clem ran unopposed in the Republican primary, and defeated Democrat Dylan Czarnecki in the general election with 89% of the vote.

== Personal life ==
Clem is the former pastor at Central Baptist Church in Gillette. Clem has been paralyzed from the waist down since the age 19 due to injuries sustained in a skiing incident at Deer Mountain in the Black Hills.
