= Joseph M. Barbuto =

American politician and current Chair of the Wyoming Democratic Party

Joe Barbuto

Chair of the Wyoming Democratic Party
- In office April 8, 2017 – June 1, 2025
- Preceded by: Ana Cuprill
- Succeeded by: Lucas Fralick

Member of the Wyoming House of Representatives from the 48th district
- In office December 10, 2008 – January 8, 2013
- Preceded by: Marty Martin
- Succeeded by: Mark Baker

Personal details
- Born: August 15, 1983 (age 43) Rock Springs, Wyoming, U.S.
- Party: Democratic
- Education: Northwest College (attended); University of Wyoming (attended)

Joseph Montague "Joe" Barbuto (born August 15, 1983 in Rock Springs, Wyoming) is a former Sweetwater County Treasurer, Chair of the Wyoming Democratic Party, and a Democratic former member of the Wyoming State Legislature, representing House District 48 in the 59th through 61st Wyoming Legislatures.

Barbuto first ran for house district 48 in 2008, defeating opponent Tony Herrera. Barbuto went on to win the general election unopposed. Upon the resignation of then Representative Marty Martin, who was appointed to fill the unexpired term of state Senator Rae Lynn Job, Barbuto was appointed early, sworn in December 10, to his position and served briefly in the 59th Wyoming State Legislature. His elected term in the 60th Wyoming Legislature began in January 2009. In 2010, Barbuto ran for reelection unopposed. During the 61st legislature, he was elected to serve as the House Minority Caucus Chairman.

Barbuto was named legislator of the year in 2010 and 2011 by the Wyoming Highway Patrol Association.

In 2017, Barbuto was elected as Chair of the Wyoming Democratic Party. He was unanimously reelected in 2019 and 2021. Per changes to state party bylaws, starting in 2021, the term of the state chair will be four years.

In July 2021, Barbuto was selected by the Sweetwater County Board of Commissioners to fill the unexpired term of County Treasurer Robb Slaughter. Barbuto was sworn in and began serving in this position on July 21, 2021.

In December of 2024, Barbuto announced that he would be a candidate for Vice Chair of the Democratic National Committee.

Barbuto and his wife, Erin, live in Rock Springs, Wyoming, where she works as an educator and social worker.

Party political offices
Preceded by Ana Cuprill	Chair of the Wyoming Democratic Party; 2017–2025	Succeeded by Lucas Fralick
