= Louise Ryckman =

Wyoming politician

Member of the Wyoming House of Representatives
- In office 1985–2000
- Succeeded by: Bill Thompson
- Constituency: Sweetwater County (1985-1992); 60th district (1993-2000)

Personal details
- Party: Democratic

Louise Ryckman is an American Democratic politician from Green River, Wyoming. She represented the Sweetwater/H60 district in the Wyoming House of Representatives from 1985 to 2000.
