= Wyoming's 48th House of Representatives district =

American legislative district

Wyoming's 48th State House of Representatives district
- Wyoming's 48th House of Representatives district as of 2022
Representative
Darin McCann; R–Rock Springs
- Demographics: 72% White; 2% Black; 20% Hispanic; 2% Asian; 2% Other; 2% Multiracial
- Population (2022): 8,638

Wyoming's 48th House of Representatives district is one of 62 districts in the Wyoming House of Representatives. The district encompasses part of Sweetwater County. It is represented by Republican Representative Darin McCann of Rock Springs.

In 1992, the state of Wyoming switched from electing state legislators by county to a district-based system.

== List of members representing the district ==
Representative	Party	Term	Note
Bud Nelson	Democratic	1993 – 1997	Elected in 1992. Re-elected in 1994.
Jack Steinbrech	Republican	1997 – 1999	Elected in 1996.
Bud Nelson	Democratic	1999 – 2003	Elected in 1998. Re-elected in 2000.
Marty Martin	Democratic	2003 – 2008	Elected in 2002. Re-elected in 2004. Re-elected in 2006. Resigned in 2008.
Joseph M. Barbuto	Democratic	2008 – 2013	Elected in 2008. Appointed in 2008. Re-elected in 2010.
Mark Baker	Republican	2013 – 2017	Elected in 2012. Re-elected in 2014. Re-elected in 2016. Resigned in 2017.
Clark Stith	Republican	2017 – 2025	Appointed in 2017. Re-elected in 2018. Re-elected in 2020. Re-elected in 2022.
Darin McCann	Republican	2025 – present	Elected in 2024.
James Wamsley	Republican	2027 – member-elect	Elected in 2026.

== Recent election results ==
=== 2014 ===
House district 48 general election
Party	Candidate	Votes	%
Republican	Mark Baker (incumbent)	1,149	50.48%
Democratic	Joseph M. Barbuto	1,122	49.29%
Write-ins		5	0.21%
Total votes		2,276	100.0%
Invalid or blank votes		49	
Republican hold			

=== 2016 ===
House district 48 general election
Party	Candidate	Votes	%
Republican	Mark Baker (incumbent)	1,957	58.29%
Democratic	Jackie Freeze	1,394	41.52%
Write-ins		6	0.17%
Total votes		3,357	100.0%
Invalid or blank votes		161	
Republican hold			

=== 2018 ===
House district 48 general election
Party	Candidate	Votes	%
Republican	Clark Stith (incumbent)	1,882	96.61%
Write-ins		66	3.38%
Total votes		1,948	100.0%
Invalid or blank votes		712	
Republican hold			

=== 2020 ===
House district 48 general election
Party	Candidate	Votes	%
Republican	Clark Stith (incumbent)	2,573	96.65%
Write-ins		89	3.34%
Total votes		2,662	100.0%
Invalid or blank votes		568	
Republican hold			

=== 2022 ===
House district 48 general election
Party	Candidate	Votes	%
Republican	Clark Stith (incumbent)	1,530	66.87%
Libertarian	Misty Morris	743	32.47%
Write-ins		15	0.65%
Total votes		2,288	100.0%
Invalid or blank votes		114	
Republican hold			

=== 2024 ===
House district 48 general election
Party	Candidate	Votes	%
Republican	Darin McCann	2,715	96.48%
Write-ins		99	3.51%
Total votes		2,814	100.0%
Invalid or blank votes		515	
Republican hold			

== Historical district boundaries ==
Map	Description	Apportionment Plan	Notes
	Sweetwater County (part)	1992 Apportionment Plan	
	Fremont County (part); Sweetwater County (part)	2002 Apportionment Plan	
	Sweetwater County (part)	2012 Apportionment Plan	
