= Dan Kirkbride =

American politician (born 1952)

Member of the Wyoming House of Representatives from the 4th district
- In office January 8, 2013 – January 12, 2021
- Preceded by: Edward Buchanan
- Succeeded by: Jeremy Haroldson

Personal details
- Born: October 7, 1952 (age 73) Cheyenne, Wyoming, U.S.
- Party: Republican
- Spouse: Lynn Kirkbride
- Children: 5
- Education: University of Wyoming
- Profession: Cattle rancher, Politician

Dan R. Kirkbride (born October 7, 1952) is an American politician and former Wyoming state legislator. A member of the Republican Party, Kirkbride represented the 4th district in the Wyoming House of Representatives from 2013 to 2021.

In the August 2020 Republican primary, Kirkbride was defeated by Jeremy Haroldson.

== Education ==
Kirkbride graduated from the University of Wyoming in 1975 with a bachelor's degree in journalism.

== Elections ==
- 2012: When Republican Representative Edward Buchanan retired and left the District 4 seat open, Kirkbride won the three-way August 21, 2012 Republican Primary with 940 votes (37.1%), and won the November 6, 2012 General election with 3,626 votes (70.5%) against Constitution Party candidate Bill Motley.
- 2014: Kirkbride was unopposed in the August 19, 2014 Republican Primary and won with 2,307 votes. Kirkbride was also unchallenged in the November 4, 2014 General Election, winning with 3,326 votes.
- 2016: Kirkbride defeated Tyler Shockley in the August 16, 2016 Republican Primary, winning with 1,286 votes (59.43%). Subsequently, Kirkbride defeated Joe Michaels of the Constitution Party in the November 8, 2016 General Election, winning with 3,652 votes (75.50%).
- 2018: Kirkbride was unopposed in both the August 21, 2018 Republican Primary and the November 6, 2018 General Election, winning with 2,225 and 3,645 votes respectively.
- 2020: Kirkbride lost the August 18, 2020 Republican Primary to Jeremy Haroldson with 1,391 votes (46.0%), and is thus ineligible for reelection in the upcoming general election and will leave office in 2021.
