= Mark Baker (Wyoming politician) =

American politician

Member of the Wyoming House of Representatives
- In office January 12, 2021 – January 2023
- Preceded by: John Freeman
- Succeeded by: Tony Niemiec
- Constituency: 60th district
- In office January 8, 2013 – May 15, 2017
- Preceded by: Joseph M. Barbuto
- Succeeded by: Clark Stith
- Constituency: 48th district

Personal details
- Party: Republican
- Children: 1

Mark Baker is an American politician who served as Republican member of the Wyoming House of Representatives, representing the 60th district from January 4, 2021 to January 2023. Baker previously served as a representative from the 48th district from January 8, 2013, until his resignation on May 15, 2017.

== Elections ==
=== 2012 ===
Challenging incumbent Democratic Representative Joseph M. Barbuto for the District 48 seat, Baker was unopposed for the August 21, 2012 Republican Primary, winning with 374 votes, and won the November 6, 2012 General election with 1,723 votes (49.5%) against Barbuto.

=== 2014 ===
Baker faced a rematch against former Democratic Representative Joseph M. Barbuto. Baker ran unopposed in the Republican primary and defeated Barbuto by 27 votes, taking 50.4% of the vote.

=== 2016 ===
Baker ran unopposed in the Republican primary, and defeated Democratic Western Wyoming Community College administrator Jackie Freeze with 58.3% of the vote.

Baker did not run for re-election in 2022.
