= Jim McBride (Wyoming politician) =

American politician

Wyoming Superintendent of Public Instruction
- In office August 18, 2005 – January 3, 2011
- Governor: Dave Freudenthal
- Preceded by: Trent Blankenship
- Succeeded by: Cindy Hill

Personal details
- Born: October 14, 1948 (age 77) Sunbury, Pennsylvania, United States
- Party: Republican
- Spouse: Sandi
- Children: Monique and Jim
- Education: Bloomsburg University of Pennsylvania (BS); Pennsylvania State University (MA); Louisiana Tech University (MBA); University of North Carolina (PhD)

Jim McBride (born October 14, 1948) is a Republican politician who served as the Wyoming Superintendent of Public Instruction from 2005 to 2011. McBride was appointed by Governor Dave Freudenthal to the office in 2005 and he was re-elected in 2006 before losing re-election to Cindy Hill in 2010.

== Background ==
McBride was born in Sunbury, Pennsylvania, and graduated from Shamokin Area High School in 1966. He then attended Bloomsburg University of Pennsylvania, graduating with a bachelor's degree in earth and space science in 1970, and Pennsylvania State University, where he graduated with a master's degree in education in 1971. He then taught junior high school science in Dover, Delaware, from 1971 to 1975, when he joined the United States Air Force. He became the President of the Community College of the Air Force in 1996, and served until 2001. McBride then relocated to Bennett, Colorado, where he became superintendent of the local school district. He moved to Wyoming in 2003, when he accepted a position as a technology administrator for the state department of education.

== Superintendent ==
In 2005, incumbent Superintendent Trent Blankenship resigned as Superintendent, following conflict with Governor Freudenthal, to become superintendent of schools in Barrow, Alaska. Under state law, to fill the vacancy, the Republican Party of Wyoming would nominate three candidates, one of whom would be selected by the Governor. After a public selection process, the state party nominated McBride; Annette Bohling, an administrator within the state department; and Donald Bryngelson, the director of the state school facilities commission. After interviewing the candidates, Freudenthal appointed McBride as Blankenship's replacement.

McBride ran for re-election in 2006 and won the Republican primary unopposed. In the general election, he faced Michelle Hoffman, the Democratic nominee and the Superintendent of Fremont County School District No. 14. Hoffman attacked McBride for cuts that he had allegedly made to special education programs, though McBride's office contested the accuracy of her attacks. The Casper Star-Tribune endorsed McBride for re-election, arguing that he "deserves to be elected to a full term to continue the work he has begun" and that he "brought stability to the department and put the employees on the same page." Ultimately, McBride defeated Hoffman by a wide margin, winning 59% of the vote to her 41%.

In 2010, McBride ran for a second full term, but faced significant opposition in the Republican primary. He was challenged by his predecessor, Trent Blankenship, along with assistant high school principal Cindy Hill and Ted Adams, the Laramie County School District No. 1 Superintendent. During the campaign, McBride was attacked over the administration of the state's standardized testing system. He lost the Republican primary to Hill by a wide margin, winning just 25% of the vote to her 49%, while Blankenship won 15% and Adams won 11%.

Political offices
Preceded by Trent Blankenship	Wyoming Superintendent of Public Instruction; August 18, 2005 – January 3, 2011	Succeeded by Cindy Hill
