= Edward Buchanan =

American politician

Ed Buchanan
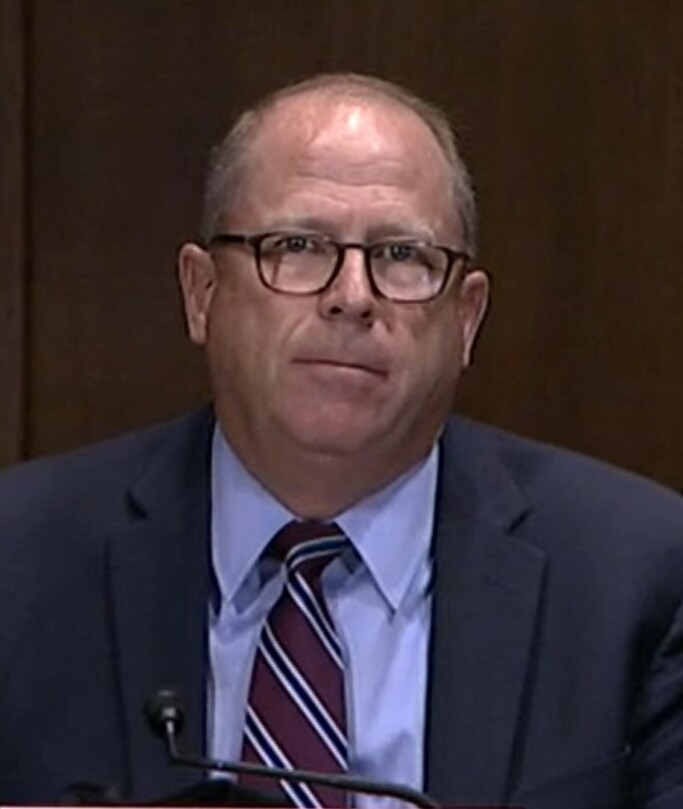
- Buchanan in 2021

22nd Secretary of State of Wyoming
- In office March 1, 2018 – September 17, 2022
- Governor: Matt Mead; Mark Gordon
- Preceded by: Karen Wheeler (Acting)
- Succeeded by: Karl Allred (Acting)

61st Speaker of the Wyoming House of Representatives
- In office January 11, 2011 – January 7, 2013
- Preceded by: Colin M. Simpson
- Succeeded by: Tom Lubnau

Member of the Wyoming House of Representatives from the 4th district
- In office January 14, 2003 – January 7, 2013
- Preceded by: Roger Huckfeldt
- Succeeded by: Dan Kirkbride

Personal details
- Born: Edward Allen Buchanan; October 19, 1967 (age 58) Fort Lauderdale, Florida, U.S.
- Party: Republican
- Spouse: Amber
- Children: 4
- Education: University of Wyoming (BA, JD); University of Colorado Colorado Springs (MPA)

Military service
- Allegiance: United States
- Branch/service: United States Air Force
- Years of service: 1990 – 1994

Edward Allen Buchanan (born October 19, 1967) is an American politician, attorney, and military veteran, who served as the Wyoming Secretary of State from 2018 to 2022. Prior to being Secretary of State, Buchanan was a member and past Speaker of the Wyoming House of Representatives.

== Political career ==
A Republican, Buchanan represented House District 4 from 2003 until 2013, first in Goshen County and then from Platte and Converse counties. Buchanan was Majority Leader of the Wyoming House of Representatives from 2009 until 2011, and was elected Speaker of the Wyoming House of Representatives in 2011. He served until his retirement in 2013, and was succeeded as Speaker by Tom Lubnau of Gillette in Campbell County.

Buchanan ran for Wyoming Secretary of State in the 2014 elections, narrowly losing the contest in a four-way race. After Secretary of State Ed Murray resigned, Governor Matt Mead appointed Buchanan to serve the remaining 10 months of Murray's term. He was subsequently elected to a full term in the 2018 election defeating James W. Byrd. In 2021, Buchanan was considered by early polling to be the leading potential candidate to take on Rep. Liz Cheney in 2022. Ultimately, Buchanan chose to remain in his role as Secretary of State. He initially ran for re-election in 2022, but withdrew to become a district court judge.

On July 30, Governor Mark Gordon appointed Buchanan to be District Judge of the Eighth Judicial District. Buchanan announced he would resign early from the secretary of state position, and did so on September 17. Karl Allred was subsequently appointed acting secretary and sworn in on October 3, 2022.

== Personal life ==
Buchanan moved to Wyoming with his family at age 3 and grew up farming and ranching on the Bar KW ranch in Goshen County. Buchanan received a bachelor's in 1990 and a juris doctor degree in 1994 from the University of Wyoming at Laramie. He also received a master's degree in public administration from the University of Colorado Colorado Springs in 1994, while serving in the United States Air Force. He served in the air force from 1990 to 1994 and was an officer. He and his wife Amber have two girls and two boys.

Political offices
Preceded by Colin Simpson	Speaker of the Wyoming House of Representatives; 2011–2013	Succeeded by Tom Lubnau
Preceded by Karen Wheeler; Acting	Secretary of State of Wyoming; 2018–2022	Succeeded by Karl Allred; Acting
