= Jene Jansen =

American politician (born 1948)

Jene A. Jansen (born June 17, 1948) is an American former politician who served on the Wyoming House of Representatives from 2003 to 2004.

== Early life and career ==
Jansen was born on June 17, 1948, in Redfield, South Dakota. He completed an associate's degree in law enforcement and bachelor's degree in political science, both at the University of South Dakota. He served in the United States Marine Corps as a captain.

== In Wyoming ==
Jansen served as an officer of the Wyoming Pupil Transportation Association from 1992 to 1999, as treasurer of the association from 1994. He was transportation director for the Campbell County School District, and maintained the post throughout his tenure as a member of the Wyoming House of Representatives. By June 2002, Jensen had registered to contest the seat in house district 31 vacated by John Hines, and faced fellow Republican candidate Marion Scott. After winning the election in November 2002, Jansen was promptly appointed to the state house committee on corporations, elections and political subdivisions, as well as the committee on transportation and highways. Jansen planned to run for reelection in 2004, and was the only candidate in his district to file by the May deadline. However, on July 30, 2004, Jansen resigned his legislative seat to accept a job at a school in California. The Wyoming Republican Party nominated Tom Lubnau following a write-in vote, who ran unopposed for Jensen's seat.
