= Tony Niemiec =

American politician

Member of the Wyoming House of Representatives from the 60th district
- In office January 2, 2023 – January 2025
- Preceded by: Mark Baker
- Succeeded by: Marlene Brady

Personal details
- Party: Republican

Tony Niemiec is an American politician. He served as a Republican member for the 60th district of the Wyoming House of Representatives.

In the 2024 Wyoming House of Representatives election, he was defeated in the Republican primary by Marlene Brady.
