= Jene Newsome =

United States Air Force sergeant

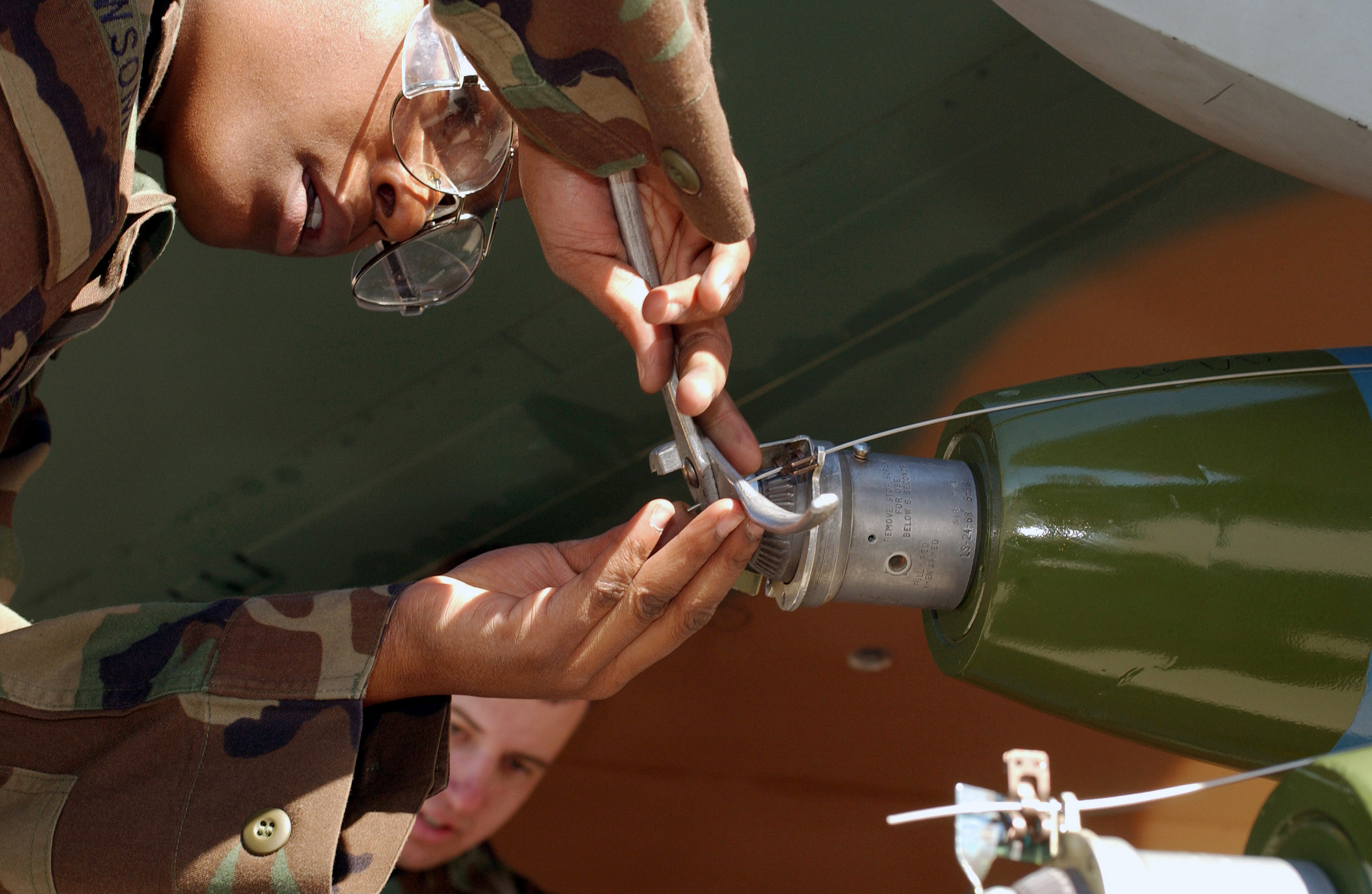
- Jene Newsome working on a missile, 2001
- Born: Swatara Township, Pennsylvania
- Spouse: Cheryl Hutson (m. 2009)
- Military career
- Allegiance: United States
- Branch: United States Air Force
- Service years: 2001-2010
- Rank: Sergeant
- Unit: Aircraft Armament Systems craftsman
- Commands: Ellsworth Air Force Base

Jene Newsome was a United States Air Force sergeant who was honorably discharged after 9 years of service under the "Don't ask, don't tell" policy. She was outed by the Rapid City Police Department on November 24, 2009, after they saw an Iowa marriage license on her kitchen table. This raised questions about third party outings under the military's "Don't Ask, Don't Tell" policy.

== Background ==
Jene Newsome is a native of Swatara Township, Pennsylvania and attended Central Dauphin East High School. She has a brother, 5 years her junior, Michael Newsome. She legally married Cheryl Hutson in October 2009 in Iowa.

== History ==
Jene Newsome was serving as an aircraft armament system craftsman when the Rapid City Police Department called her at Ellsworth Air Force Base seeking to determine the whereabouts of her wife, who was wanted on theft charges in Fairbanks, Alaska. Newsome refused to leave work immediately to help the officers in their search, and they saw her Iowa marriage license in her home. Whether the officers entered the home or looked through a window and saw the license sitting on the kitchen table is unclear. After several phone calls from the officers, Newsome arrived home to find officer Jeremy Stauffacher, detective Tom Garinger, and her wife inside her home. Four days after Hutson's arrest, the police reported the marriage license to the Air Force via a fax headed "FYI." Newsome's wife was later reported released on bail and facing one felony and three misdemeanor theft charges.

== Discharge ==
Newsome's discharge came at a time when the Pentagon was conducting an extensive internal review of the "Don't Ask, Don't Tell" policy, ordered by Defense Secretary Robert Gates and Joint Chiefs Chairman Michael Mullen. As part of the review, the Pentagon was expected to suggest ways to minimize third-party outings, especially those suspected to be a result of vindictiveness, by relaxing enforcement of the policy. Gates hinted to senators that, in advance of the anticipated repeal of the policy, the Pentagon could enforce the policy more fairly by avoiding discharges on the basis of such third-party outings. Representative Joe Sestak, a former Navy admiral, cited Newsome's case as an example of why President Barack Obama should stop dismissals of gay and lesbian service members while Congress was working towards ending the policy. Newsome initially filed a complaint with the help of the American Civil Liberties Union (ACLU), claiming that the police violated her privacy since her sexual orientation had nothing to do with the police investigation. With help from her lawyers at the ACLU, she sought $800,000 from Rapid City Mayor Alan Hanks and the city council to compensate for her financial losses, which include loss of the chance to qualify for a retirement plan worth $500,000 or more. She also asked for an apology and a new police policy barring the department from releasing information about someone's sexual orientation. Rapid City Police Department police chief Steve Allender said that the marriage license was relevant to the investigation because it revealed both the relationship between the two women and their residency. They also insisted that they always notify the military if a service person is involved in an investigation, and later said that Newsome was suspected of harboring a fugitive.

Following the incident, a Facebook group entitled "Justice for Jene" was created. In addition to the requests Newsome has made, it also demands that the officers involved in the incident be reprimanded.

Newsome planned to re-enlist in October 2011, following the end of the Don't Ask, Don't Tell policy.

== See also ==
- Sexual orientation and the United States military
