= Douglas Moore (football manager) =

New Zealand football manager

Personal information
- Date of birth: 19 July 1944 (age 82)
- Place of birth: Newcastle upon Tyne, England

Youth career
- Years: Team
- 1956–1960: Aston Villa
- 1960–1963: Wolverhampton Wanderers
- 1963–1966: Sheffield United
- 1966–1968: Walsall

Managerial career
- 1986–1989: Al-Jahra
- 1989–1990: Al-Salmiya
- 1994–1995: Singapore
- 1997–1998: Geylang United
- 1999–2000: New Zealand Women
- 2001: Lock Haven Bald Eagles Women
- 2002–2015: Lock Haven Bald Eagles Men

Douglas Moore is an English former football manager.

== Early and personal life ==
Born in Newcastle upon Tyne, England, Moore began his footballing career in the academy of Aston Villa, going on to also play for Wolverhampton Wanderers, Sheffield United and Walsall – though he does not appear to have ever played professionally. He graduated from the University of Sheffield with a degree in Geography.

While in New Zealand, Moore met New Zealand international softball player and football goalkeeper Leslie King, whom he would later go on to marry. He had a daughter and son, Lindsey and Stewart, respectively, from a previous marriage.

== Managerial career ==
Having started as a youth coach at Birmingham City, Moore was a coach at the New Zealand men's national football team between 1978 and 1986, including their qualification to the 1982 FIFA World Cup. He managed Al-Jahra in Kuwait, helping the club earn promotion from the Kuwaiti Division Two, which he followed by winning the 1987–88 Kuwaiti Division One. He also managed Al-Salmiya between 1989 and 1990.

In January 1994 he moved to Singapore, and was appointed technical soccer director at the recommendation of Peter Velappan, who was then-secretary of the Asian Football Confederation. Initially hired to assist Ken Worden, he was named as manager of the under-16, under-19 and under-23 squads of Singapore. However, after the shock resignation of Worden, Moore was named as manager of the men's first team in March 1994. In May 1995, having won the 1994 Liga Perdana and the 1994 Malaysia Cup, Moore was named as Chief Executive Officer of the S-League, relinquishing his position as manager of the Singapore National Team.

Having stepped down from his position as Chief Executive Officer in May 1997, he reportedly drew the interest of Redhill Rangers and Marine Castle, two newcomers to the S-League. However, he was appointed 'manager-coach' of Geylang United in October of the same year, reportedly turning down an offer from the Moldova national football team in the process.

Following the impact of the 1997 Asian financial crisis, Moore left his role at Geylang United in November 1998. He returned to New Zealand, in part to support his wife, Leslie King, in her position as captain of the New Zealand women's national softball team. He was linked with a return to Singapore with Woodlands Wellington in October 1999, but instead remained in New Zealand to manage the New Zealand women's national football team. He relocated to Pennsylvania, United States, where he was appointed head of the women's soccer programme at the Commonwealth University-Lock Haven in 2001, before moving to coach the men's team the following year – a position he held until the end of the 2015 season.

== Managerial statistics ==
Managerial record by team and tenure
Team	From	To	Record								PPM
Team	From	To	P	W	D	L	GF	GA	GD	Win %	PPM
New Zealand Women	1999	2000	5	0	0	5	2	19	−17	0.00	0.00
Total			5	0	0	5	2	19	−17	0.00	
