= Samuel D. Shannon =

American politician

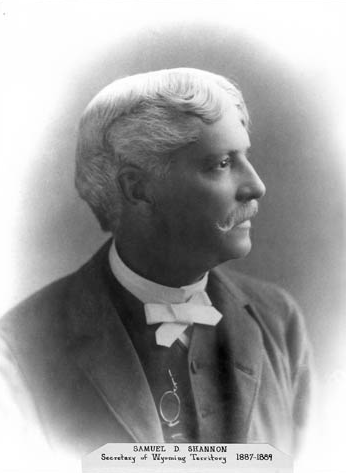

7th Secretary of the Wyoming Territory
- In office April 9, 1887 – July 1, 1889
- Preceded by: Elliott S. N. Morgan
- Succeeded by: John W. Meldrum

Personal details
- Born: Samuel Davis Shannon; May 3, 1834 Camden, South Carolina, U.S.
- Died: September 9, 1896 (aged 62) Pikesville, Maryland, U.S.
- Resting place: Loudon Park Cemetery, Baltimore, Maryland, U.S.
- Party: Democratic
- Spouse: Elizabeth Peton Giles

Military service
- Allegiance: Confederate States of America
- Branch/service: Confederate States Army
- Years of service: 1860-1865
- Battles/wars: American Civil War

Samuel Davis Shannon (May 3, 1833 – September 9, 1896) was an American soldier and politician who served as the 7th Secretary of the Wyoming Territory as a Democrat.

== Life ==
Samuel Davis Shannon was born on May 3, 1833, in South Carolina and during the Civil War married Elizabeth Peton Giles. In December 1860 in joined the Confederate Army and was given the rank of captain and during the American Civil War he served on the staff of Major General Richard H. Anderson.

Following the Civil War he became a journalist, but later moved to Denver, Colorado due to poor health and then to Cheyenne, Wyoming. On April 9, 1887, he was appointed by President Grover Cleveland as Secretary of the Wyoming Territory and served until July 1, 1889. Following his tenure he returned to the eastern United States and was later placed into a Soldier's Home in Pikesville, Maryland, where he died from Bright's disease on September 9, 1896.
