= Douglas Moore (American politician) =

American politician

Member of the Wyoming House of Representatives from the 31st district
- member-elect
- Assumed office January 4, 2027
- Preceded by: John Bear

Personal details
- Party: Republican
- Website: Campaign website

Douglas Moore is an American politician. A member of the Republican Party, he is the member-elect of the Wyoming House of Representatives for the 31st district. He was elected at the 2026 election. He is a veteran energy industry manager. He is based in Campbell County, Wyoming.
