= Cindy Hill (politician) =

American politician

Cindy Jo Hill
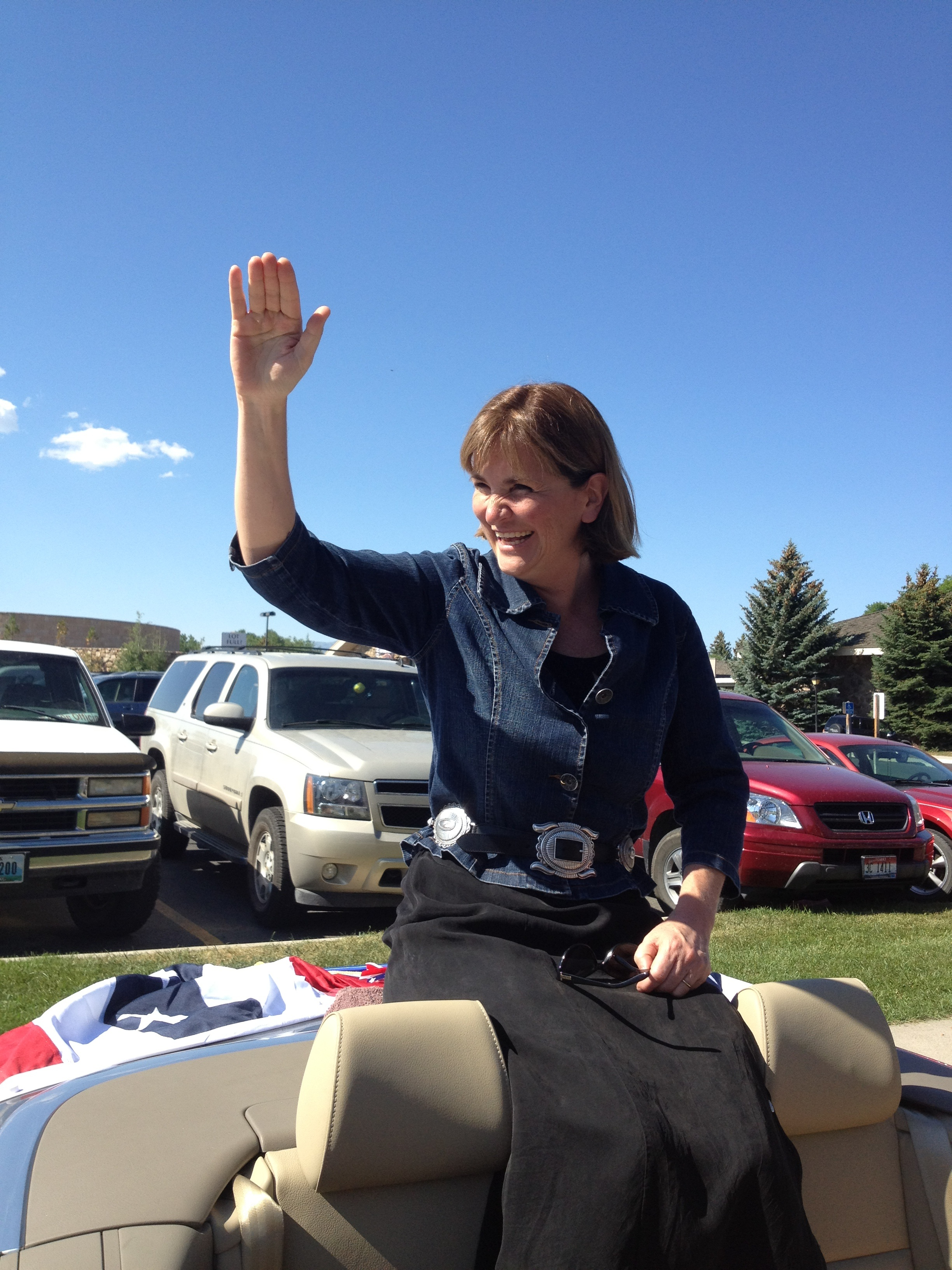
- Cindy Hill 2012

Wyoming Superintendent of Public Instruction
- In office January 3, 2011 – January 15, 2022
- Preceded by: Jim McBride
- Succeeded by: Jillian Balow

Personal details
- Political party: Republican
- Spouse: Drake Hill

Cindy Jo Hill is a former Wyoming Superintendent of Public Instruction serving from 2015-2022. In 2013, Governor Matt Mead signed legislation transferring Hill's powers to a newly created director position. Hill sued, and in 2014, the Wyoming Supreme Court ruled removing Hill was unconstitutional and she served the remainder of her term.

== Superindendent of Public Instruction ==
=== Election ===
Hill ran for Wyoming Superintendent of Public Instruction in 2010 against incumbent Jim McBride and two other challengers, Trent Blankenship, the former Superintendent of Public Instruction and Ted Adams, the Laramie County School District 1 Superintendent. Hill won the primary by a wide margin, winning 49% of the vote to McBridge's 25%, Blankenship's 15%, and Adams's 11%.

Hill ran against State Senator Mike Massie in the general election, who attacked Hill for releasing her education plan weeks, which was simplistic and vague, weeks before the election. Before the polls opened, Hill's former boss Ted Adams, whom she defeated in the primary, claimed that he fired her from her previous job as assistant principal of Cheyenne junior high school and that she was unfit for the position. It was later revealed that Hill resigned after being told she was not recommended for rehiring.

In the November general election, Hill defeated Massie, 61% to 39%.

=== Tenure ===
in late 2012, the Republican-controlled legislature released a scathing report stating that Hill and her office failed to carry out actions outlined in the Wyoming Accountability in Education Act. The legislature then passed a bipartisan bill, and signed by Governor Mead, which transferred Hill's duties to the newly created director position, turning her position into ceremonial role. Hill criticized the report and would sue to repeal the law.

The Wyoming Supreme Court ruled in March 2014 that the law was unconstitutional, and Hill returned to running the education department in April. When she returned to office, many Wyoming Department of Education employees resigned from their positions and were speaking to legislative investigators about Hill's tenure. In July 2014, the legislature released another critical report on Hill, stating that she failed to follow legislative budget directives and intentionally violated the law by having permanent employees certify that she could fire them.

Hill declined reelection and decided to run for Governor against Governor Mead. In the August primary, she came in third with 13% of the vote. Hill was succeeded by Jillian Balow, who backed Mead in the primary.

== Personal life ==
Hill is married to attorney Drake Hill.
