= Ed Murray (Wyoming politician) =

American politician

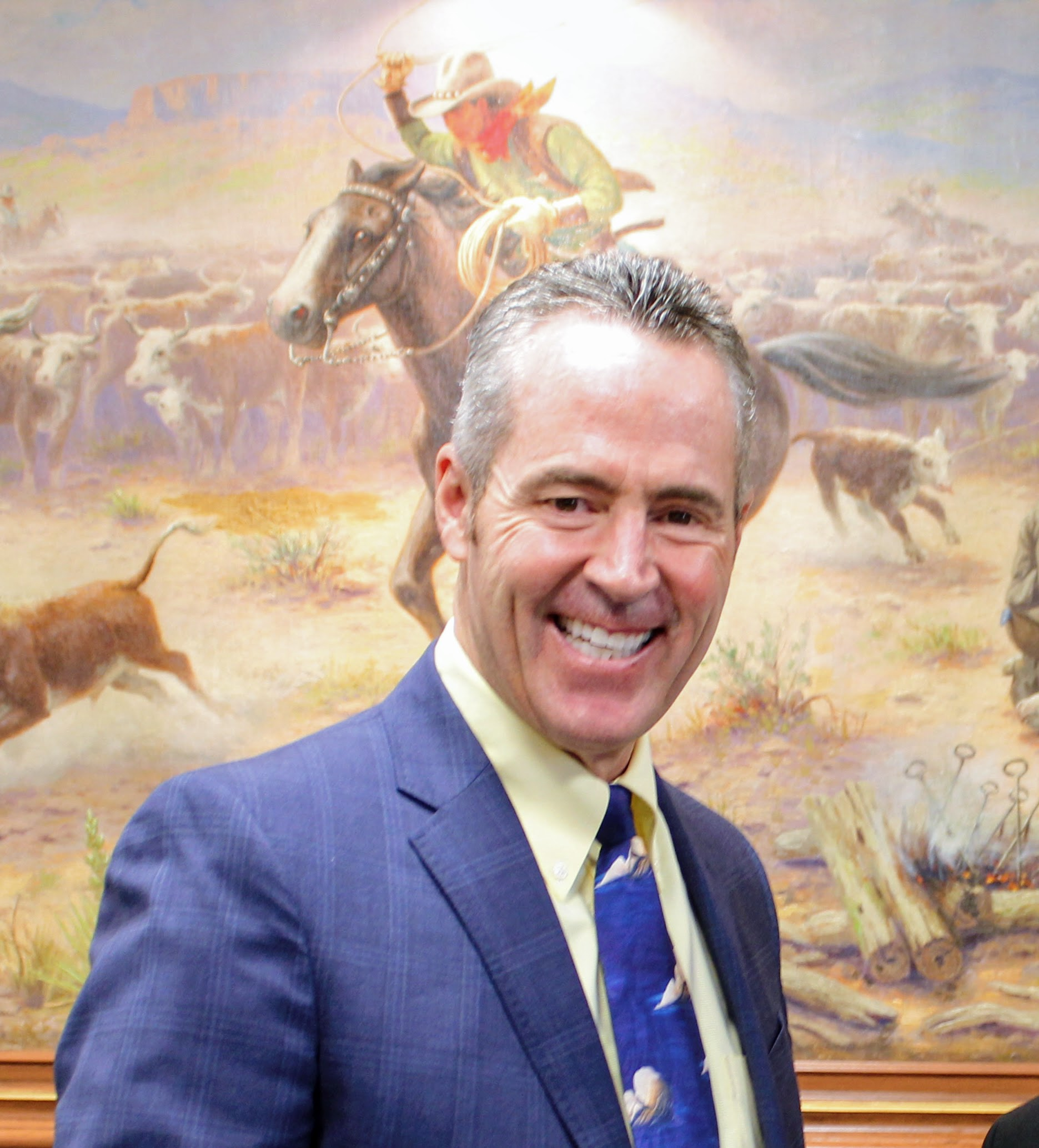
- Murray in 2017

21st Secretary of State of Wyoming
- In office January 5, 2015 – February 9, 2018
- Governor: Matt Mead
- Preceded by: Max Maxfield
- Succeeded by: Ed Buchanan

Personal details
- Born: March 28, 1958 (age 67) Laramie County, Wyoming, U.S.
- Party: Republican
- Spouse: Caren Murray
- Children: 4
- Education: University of Arizona (BA); University of Wyoming (JD)

Ed Murray (born March 28, 1958) is a former Secretary of State of Wyoming. He is a member of the Republican Party.

Murray was widely seen as a probable candidate for governor of Wyoming in the 2018 Election, but on January 23, 2018, Murray announced he would not seek reelection or run for higher office in 2018, stating he was putting family above politics, following a number of misconduct allegations.

== Early life and education ==
One of eight children, Murray was born and raised in Laramie County in a family in the Cheyenne community. He graduated from Central High School in 1976 and received an undergraduate degree in business administration with dual majors in finance and real estate from the University of Arizona. Murray graduated from the University of Wyoming College of Law.

== Career ==
Murray is a real estate investor and developer. He owns Murray Investment and Development which contained 16 business entities as of 2014. Murray is an advocate of economic development in Wyoming, in 2016 arguing against an increase in state businesses' annual filing fee.

== 2014 Wyoming Secretary of State election ==
In March 2014, Secretary of State Max Maxfield announced that he would not seek reelection. Murray declared his candidacy for the Republican Party nomination in April. Murray, who had never run for political office, won the Republican Primary by defeating five other candidates. Murray ultimately gained 37% of the vote, winning by only 1,632 votes over state Representative Edward Buchanan, the former Speaker of the Wyoming House of Representatives. Murray went on to defeat Libertarian Party nominee Howard "Kit" Carson and Constitution Party nominee Jennifer Young in the general election, receiving 77% of the vote in a state widely known to support Republican candidates.

== Wyoming Secretary of State ==
In his official capacity as Secretary of State Murray was Wyoming's Chief Business Registrar, Chief Elections Officer, Securities Commissioner, and Notaries Public Commissioner. Secretary Murray chaired the State Canvassing Board and served with four other statewide elected officials on the State Loan and Investment Board, the Board of Land Commissioners and the State Building Commission. Because Wyoming has no lieutenant governor, the secretary of state serves as acting governor if the governor is absent from the state or becomes incapable of serving.

In the summer of 2016, the Secretary of State's Office announced the launch of a business service which allows for the electronic filing of official documents and retrieval of records that were previously available only upon request. As a result, the time to process a business filing decreased from five days to as low as thirty minutes.

Murray, a Republican, opposed the formation of President Donald Trump's Presidential Advisory Commission on Election Integrity because of federal overreach into state sovereignty and was pleased when it was officially dissolved in 2018.

Murray categorically refuted any claims of rigging or interference in the Wyoming elections that he oversaw.

== #MeToo Allegations ==
Murray was one of 25 political figures whose bids for higher office ended as a result of the #MeToo movement in 2018. Beginning in December 2017, a woman accused Murray of sexually assaulting her in 1982, when she was an intern at the same law firm where Murray was an attorney. The woman claimed to have been inspired to tell her story as part of the #Metoo movement. Murray denied the allegation. Murray was one of 11 political figures accused of sexual misconduct as part of the #MeToo movement in December 2017. In January 2018 another woman accused him of a forced kiss on New Year's Eve 1988; saying in a statement that Murray said to her: "Everyone should have a kiss on New Year’s Eve." Murray said in a statement that he did not remember that incident. In the same statement, he said he would not run for governor or seek higher office.

Murray resigned on February 9, 2018. In his statement of resignation, Murray stated: "After deep and profound contemplation, I am announcing my resignation as secretary of state, effective today. I step aside with peace and serenity in order that I may fully focus on what is most important in my life: my marriage, my family and my health."

== Personal life ==
Murray and his wife Catherine ("Caren") are the parents of four adult daughters. Murray is Catholic.

In December 2019, Murray was arrested for driving under the influence of alcohol. He was later placed on probation.

== Electoral history ==
Wyoming Secretary of State Republican Primary Election, 2014
Party	Candidate	Votes	%
Republican	Ed Murray	32,944	36.86
Republican	Ed Buchanan	31,312	34.93
Republican	Pete Illoway	16,596	18.51
Republican	Clark Stith	8,511	9.49
Republican	Write-ins	274	0.31

Wyoming Secretary of State Election, 2014
Party	Candidate	Votes	%
Republican	Ed Murray	119,772	76.58
Constitution	Jennifer Young	18,918	12.10
Libertarian	Kit Carson	16,858	10.78
Write-ins	Write-ins	859	0.55

Political offices
Preceded by Max Maxfield	Secretary of State of Wyoming; 2015–2018	Succeeded by Karen Wheeler; Acting
