= Joseph Meyer (Wyoming politician) =

American politician

28th Treasurer of Wyoming
- In office January 9, 2007 – October 6, 2012
- Governor: Dave Freudenthal; Matt Mead
- Preceded by: Cynthia Lummis
- Succeeded by: Mark Gordon

19th Secretary of State of Wyoming
- In office January 3, 1999 – January 3, 2007
- Governor: Jim Geringer; Dave Freudenthal
- Preceded by: Diana J. Ohman
- Succeeded by: Max Maxfield

30th Attorney General of Wyoming
- In office January 5, 1987 – January 2, 1995
- Governor: Mike Sullivan
- Preceded by: Arch McClintock
- Succeeded by: William U. Hill

Personal details
- Born: Joseph Brown Meyer; April 22, 1941; Casper, Wyoming, U.S.
- Died: October 6, 2012 (aged 71); Cheyenne, Wyoming, U.S.
- Political party: Republican
- Spouse: Mary Orr (m. 1966)
- Children: 2
- Education: University of Wyoming (BA, JD)
- Profession: Lawyer

Joseph Brown Meyer (April 22, 1941 – October 6, 2012) was an American politician from the U.S. state of Wyoming.

== Background ==
Meyer was born in 1941 in Casper, Wyoming. He graduated from Natrona County High School and was educated at the University of Wyoming in Laramie, from which he earned his undergraduate degree and then his J.D. He began his career as the Fremont County attorney before going into the private practice of law.

== Political career ==
In 1971, Meyer returned to public service when he was selected to serve as the first assistant director of the Legislative Service Office in Cheyenne during the administration of Governor Stanley K. Hathaway. Meyer worked with lawmakers to prepare hundreds of bills, many of which became and remain state law. Meyer remained with the legislative office until he was appointed attorney general in 1987 by Democratic governor Mike Sullivan. Sullivan expressed apprehension when he approached the Republican Meyer to be his attorney general: "I didn't know if he'd be willing to risk a promising political future by signing on to an untested Democratic governor. But he was willing to take on that risk, and I think that reflects his courage."

In Wyoming, the attorney general is chosen by the governor and not elected. Attorney General Meyer forged an agreement with ExxonMobil over the determination of the value of the company's natural gas processing and transportation facilities in Sublette and Lincoln counties. When production began in the two counties began in 1986, gas price were low, and the method of valuation brought no taxable value to the state. Meyer hence worked to procure dividends to the state in mineral revenues. After his tenure as attorney general ended, Meyer subsequently served as a special assistant for governmental relations and communications to the president of the University of Wyoming.

In 1998, Meyer was elected Secretary of State. He was reelected in 2002 and served in that position from 1999 until 2007. The Wyoming secretary of state is also the acting lieutenant governor. He pushed for statewide voter registration so that the voting histories of Wyoming residents follow them whenever they move. In 2006, he was elected state Treasurer. He was re-elected in 2010, having served from 2007 until his death in 2012.

Wyoming's state treasurer manages the state's $14 billion portfolio and is, ex officio, a member of the Wyoming Retirement Board, the State Loan and Investment Board, the State Board of Land Commissioners, and the State Canvassing Board. Meyer was succeeded as treasurer by Mark Gordon, a former candidate for the sole seat that Wyoming holds in the United States House of Representatives appointed to the post by Governor Matt Mead.

== Personal life and death ==
Meyer and his wife, the former Mary Orr, wed on September 3, 1966. The couple had two sons, Vince and Warren Meyer, and two grandsons, Ethan and Devin Meyer, all of Cheyenne.

Meyer was diagnosed with lung cancer in 2009. In January 2012, he missed several weeks of work for successful brain surgery to extract cancer deposits. However, he died from lung cancer on October 6, 2012, aged 71, at the Davis Hospice Center in Cheyenne.

== Legacy ==
Governor Mead termed Meyer's death a "tremendous loss" for the state and ordered that U.S. and Wyoming flags be flown at half-staff, sunrise to sunset, for two weeks in Meyer's honor. Mead said that Meyer "cared deeply about his this state and its people and always put Wyoming first. His legacy of service is unmatched. He will be remembered for his wisdom and his wit."

Former vice president of the United States Dick Cheney, who attended Natrona County High School and the University of Wyoming with Meyer, recalled that the two had also shared a small one-bedroom apartment in Laramie. After Cheney was elected in 1978 to the U.S. House, he offered Meyer the chief of staff position, but Meyer told him, "Dick, I'll never leave Wyoming.... I wanted to be involved in public life and public service, but ... my future lies in Wyoming, and I want to be here for the state and the people of Wyoming."

Former governor Dave Freudenthal, a Democrat who preceded Matt Mead, said that Meyer "had the greatest public service record in recent history. He was a lifetime friend of Nancy and me and a lifelong friend of Wyoming." Mike Sullivan called him "a true son of Wyoming. As my attorney general, he provided me with support, friendship and representation as he did for the people of the state with extraordinary confidence and judgment. During his entire career he and his wife Mary served the people of Wyoming with common sense, good judgment, and good humor."

A service was held in the state capitol rotunda in Cheyenne six days later on October 18, 2012, after which time Meyer lay in state until 6 pm. A memorial service followed the next day at Cheyenne Hills Church, a Baptist congregation founded in 1992 and since located at 7505 U.S. Highway 30, followed by a reception in Meyer's memory. After the body lay in state, it was cremated prior to the memorial service. At the memorial service, Governor Mead described Meyer's life as "a Wyoming story: a cowboy riding to his last day because it's not just what he does, it is who he is. He works to bring every stray cow to a better place. And in Joe's case, it was giving your beloved state your every effort and your every breath to bring Wyoming to a better place."

Legal offices
Preceded by A.G. McClintock	Attorney General of Wyoming; 1987 – 1995	Succeeded by William U. Hill
Political offices
Preceded by Diana J. Ohman	Secretary of State of Wyoming; 1999–2007	Succeeded by Max Maxfield
Preceded by Cynthia Lummis	Wyoming State Treasurer; 2007–2012	Succeeded by Mark Gordon
