= Secretary of State of Wyoming =

State secretary of state of the U.S. state of Wyoming

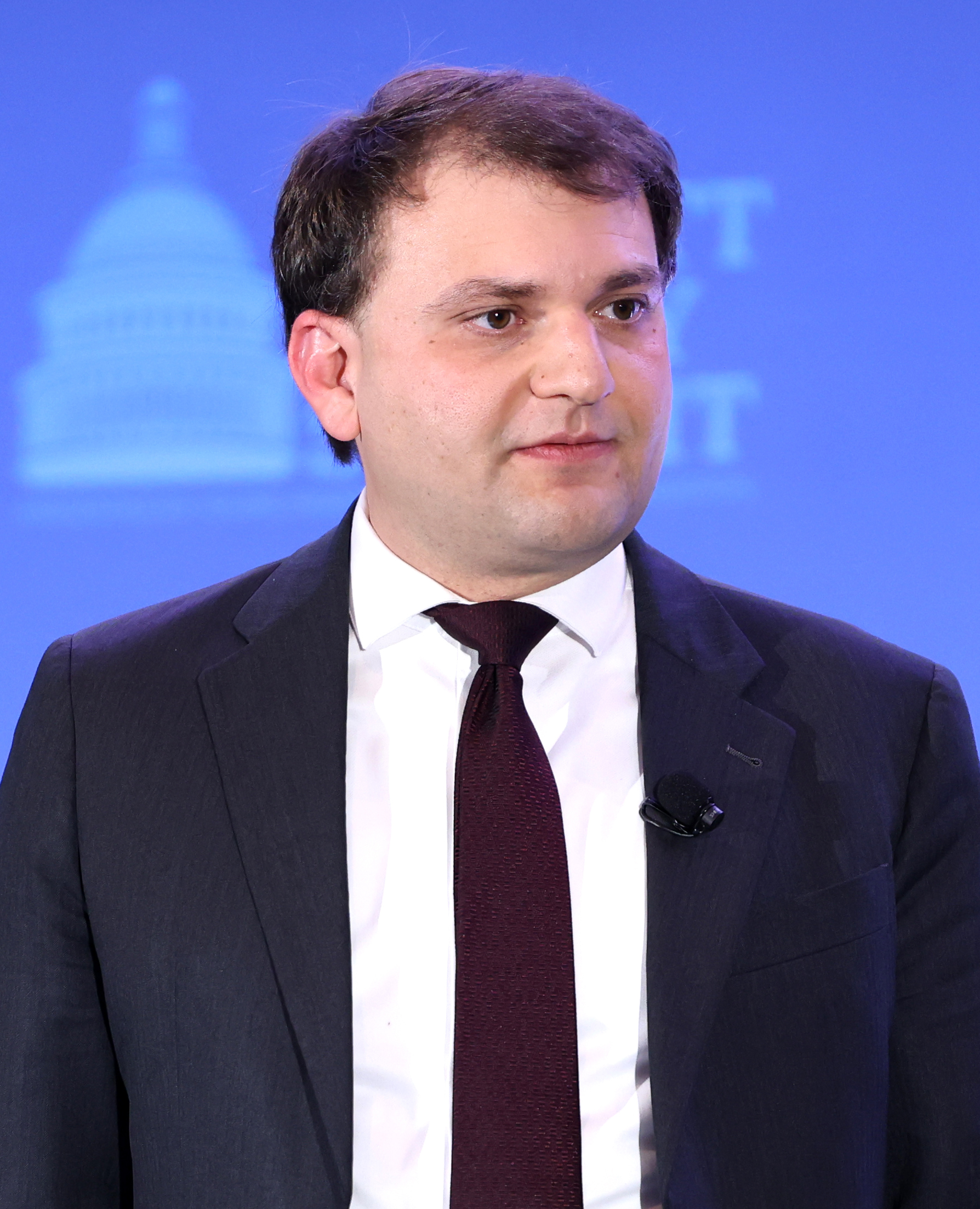
- Incumbent; Chuck Gray since January 2, 2023
- Type: Secretary of State
- Constituting instrument: Constitution of Wyoming
- Formation: 1890
- First holder: Amos W. Barber
- Website: Official website

The secretary of state of Wyoming is the state secretary of state of the U.S. state of Wyoming. It is a constitutional office, established under the state constitution. Wyoming has no lieutenant governor, so the Secretary of State stands first in the line of succession to the governorship in case of a vacancy. The secretary of state is the keeper of the Great Seal of Wyoming and the state's official record-keeper. When the governor is traveling out-of-state, the secretary of state serves as acting governor. Karen Wheeler served as acting secretary of state following the vacancy of Ed Murray, until the appointment of Edward Buchanan in March, 2018, who himself resigned September 17, 2022.

The secretary of state's office is divided into five divisions:

- The Administrative Services Division keeps track of the money for the other parts of the office. This division is also responsible for the registration of notaries public, apostilles and document authentication, and is the official registrar for all state regulations.
- The Business Division files information about businesses, including charters of corporations and other business entities, and liens made pursuant to the Uniform Commercial Code. This division also registers trademarks and trade names, and is responsible for licensing Wyoming's official trademark, the Bucking Horse and Rider.
- The Compliance Division oversees the securities industry in the state, investigates violations of securities laws, and provides financial education to the public.
- The Elections Division administers elections. This task includes recording voting results for statewide elections and ensuring compliance with campaign finance laws and state and federal election laws. This division is also responsible for the registration of lobbyists.
- The Technology Division maintains the secretary of state's employees' computer equipment and programs, and maintains the secretary's website.

== Officeholders ==
Amos W. Barber became the first Wyoming secretary of state on November 8, 1890. Prior officeholders were known as Wyoming secretaries of the territory.

=== Wyoming secretaries of the territory ===
#	Image	Name	Term	Party
1		Edward Merwin Lee	1869–1870	Republican
2		Herman Glafcke	1870–1873	Republican
3		Jason B. Brown	1873–1875	Democratic
4		George W. French	1875–1879	Republican
5		Albertis Worth Spates	1879–1880	Republican
6		Elliot S. N. Morgan	1880–1887	Republican
7		Samuel D. Shannon	1887–1889	Democratic
8		John W. Meldrum	1889–1890	Republican

=== Wyoming secretaries of state ===
#	Image	Name	Term	Party
1		Amos W. Barber	1890–1895	Republican
2		Charles W. Burdick	1895–1899	Republican
3		Fenimore Chatterton	1899–1907	Republican
4		William Schnitger	1907–1911	Republican
5		Frank L. Houx	1911–1919	Democratic
6		William E. Chaplin	1919–1923	Republican
7		Frank Lucas	1923–1927	Republican
8		Alonzo M. Clark	1927–1935	Republican
9		Lester C. Hunt	1935–1943	Democratic
10		Mart T. Christensen	1943–1944	Republican
11		William M. Jack	1944–1947	Democratic
12		Arthur G. Crane	1947–1951	Republican
13		C.J. "Doc" Rogers	1951–1955	Republican
14		Everett T. Copenhaver	1955–1959	Republican
15		Jack R. Gage	1959–1963	Democratic
16		Thyra Thomson	1963–1987	Republican
17		Kathy Karpan	1987–1995	Democratic
18		Diana Ohman	1995–1999	Republican
19		Joseph Meyer	1999–2007	Republican
20		Max Maxfield	2007–2015	Republican
21		Ed Murray	2015–2018	Republican
Acting		Karen Wheeler	2018	Republican
22		Edward Buchanan	2018–2022	Republican
23		Karl Allred	2022–2023	Republican
24		Chuck Gray (Note: Gray was elected as United States representative-elect from Wyoming's at-large congressional district on November 3, 2026.)	2023–2026	Republican

== See also ==
- List of company registers
