= Max Maxfield =

American politician

20th Secretary of State of Wyoming
- In office January 3, 2007 – January 5, 2015
- Governor: Dave Freudenthal; Matt Mead
- Preceded by: Joseph B. Meyer
- Succeeded by: Ed Murray

25th Wyoming State Auditor
- In office January 3, 1999 – January 3, 2007
- Governor: Dave Freudenthal; Jim Geringer
- Preceded by: Dave Ferrari
- Succeeded by: Rita Meyer

Personal details
- Born: February 17, 1945 (age 81) Beloit, Wisconsin, U.S.
- Party: Republican
- Spouse(s): (1) Missing (2) Gayla Maxfield
- Children: 4
- Education: Janesville High School; University of Wisconsin-Whitewater
- Occupation: Administrator of non-profit associations

Max Maxfield (born February 17, 1945) is an American politician who served as the 20th Secretary of State for the U.S. state of Wyoming. He assumed the position in January 2007 and was handily reelected in November 2010. He was not a candidate for a third term in the August 2014 Republican primary election.

From 1999 to 2007, he was the 18th state auditor of Wyoming. Because Wyoming has no position of lieutenant governor, under the terms of the state's constitution, the secretary of state is first in the line of succession to be governor.

== Early life and career ==
Maxfield was born in Beloit, Wisconsin, to Ralph and Vera Maxfield. He graduated in 1963 from Joseph A. Craig High School in Janesville, Wisconsin. He first studied at the University of Wisconsin-Stevens Point before transferring to the University of Wisconsin-Whitewater, where he remained until 1966. From 1968 to 1972, he worked and resided in Wisconsin and then Michigan before he relocated to Wyoming. For twenty-three years, Maxfield served as an executive director for the YMCA and for more than a year, he was the head of the Wyoming branch of the Make-A-Wish Foundation. In addition, Maxfield led the Wyoming Recreation Commission from 1987 to 1989, and the Wyoming Department of Commerce from 1989 to 1994.

== Political career ==
Four years later he won election to state auditor and held the post until 2007, winning re-election in 2002, defeating State Senator Mark O. Harris. While he was auditor, Maxfield developed a scheme which would reimburse state employees called to active military duty for lost income and benefits. The plan was implemented in November 2001 as an executive order of then Governor Jim Geringer. With his term in office coming to a close, Maxfield sought and won election in 2006 to become Secretary of State - beating Libertarian candidate Dennis Brossman 82-18 percent. He assumed the office in January 2007. He won re-election in 2010 against Democrat Andrew Simons 76-20 percent. As Secretary of State, Maxfield is a member of the State Loan and Investment Board, the State Building Commission, and the Board of Land Commissioners, alongside his duties chairing the State Elections Canvassing Board.

Among his actions as secretary, two have received particular attention. Early in his first term Wyoming was described as a 'fraud friendly' state alongside Delaware and Nevada, owing to the ability of companies to register in the state without actually having a physical presence there, which in turn allows them to avoid certain regulations and oversight of their financial activities. While a law was passed under his watch in that first term requiring companies to be present in the state to be registered - reportedly shutting down 4,000 corporations thereafter - Maxfield has been under pressure in his second for not meeting additional recommendations from the federal government: Maxfield has resisted calls for his office to hold detailed records on corporations - instead he argued they should be relied upon to hold their own records until called for by the state. He claims that drastic regulation would affect Wyoming's "business friendly tag". This has led to the threat that federal law enforcement may step in instead, and Maxfield has responded by drafting new rules to improve the effectiveness of state financial oversight.

The second action is his lawsuit, beginning in late September 2011, to overturn the two-term limit on the five executive offices of the Wyoming state government, of which his own position is one. Approved by initiative in 1992, the term limits originally extended to state legislators as well, but in a separate lawsuit in 2004 that particular aspect of the initiative was declared unconstitutional and voided. That lawsuit did not cover the limit on the executive offices, but Maxfield argues the same principle which voided legislative term limits should be applied to the executive. Maxfield filed the motion as a 'private citizen' without consulting the other executive officers, but Governor Matt Mead expressed support for the attempt to resolve the legal uncertainties of the law - though he himself personally supports term limits - while then State Treasurer Joe B. Meyer supported Maxfield's position and opposed term limits. The Wyoming Supreme Court ruled in favor of Maxfield in 2013, when it struck down term limits for the positions of secretary of state, auditor, treasurer, and superintendent of public instruction.

In addition, he has also succeeded in bringing his office into line with federal voting guidelines as well as creating an online campaign reporting system. Maxfield is the chairman of the NASS Securities Committee and serves on its National Task Force on the Formation of Business Entities.

== Personal life ==
Married to clinical social worker Gayla Maxfield since 1988, he has four children (three from a previous marriage) and three grandchildren. He has served as president of the Wyoming Alzheimer’s Association, Laramie County United Way, Crime Stoppers, and Blue Envelope Health Fund, and is a certified lay leader for the First United Methodist Church. He is also on the Board of Directors of the Cheyenne Animal Shelter, a Rotary International Paul Harris Fellow and a hospice board member. He was also a board member of the Wyoming Congressional Youth Awards, Special Olympics, Wyoming Children’s Society, and the High Desert Riders.

Preceded by Joseph B. Meyer	Secretary of State of Wyoming; 2007–2015	Succeeded by Ed Murray
Preceded by Dave Ferrari	Wyoming State Auditor; 1999-2007	Succeeded by Rita Meyer
