= 2026 Wyoming House of Representatives election =

- November 3, 2026

All 62 seats in the Wyoming House of Representatives 32 seats needed for a majority
	Majority party	Minority party
Leader	Chip Neiman (retiring)	Mike Yin
Party	Republican	Democratic
Leader since	January 14, 2025	January 10, 2023
Leader's seat	1st	16th
Last election	83.4%, 56 seats	12.1%, 6 seats
Seats before	56	6
Seats won	55	7
Seat change	▼1	▲1
Speaker before election
Chip Neiman
Republican
Elected Speaker
TBD

The 2026 Wyoming House of Representatives election was held on November 3, 2026, to elect members of the Wyoming Legislature for the 69th Wyoming Legislature. Partisan primaries were held on August 18, 2026. Part of the 2026 United States elections, the election was held alongside races for state senate, U.S. House, and U.S. Senate.

In 2024, the Wyoming Freedom Caucus won enough primaries to gain control of the state house for the first time, and Democrats flipped a single seat in the legislature in the general election.

In 2026, multiple high-profile members of Wyoming Freedom Caucus were defeated in the Republican primary. Those who lost included Majority Leader Scott Heiner. The primary election was reportedly more decisive than the general election in the safe Republican state.

== Summary ==
Summary of the November 3, 2026 Wyoming House election results
Party	Candidates	Votes	%	Seats				
Party	Candidates	Votes	%	Before	Up	Won	After	+/–
Republican	61	134,877	79.38%	56	56	55	55	▼1
Democratic	24	27,680	16.29%	6	6	7	7	▲1
Libertarian	4	1,696	1%	0	0	0	0	Steady
Constitution	2	977	0.58%	0	0	0	0	Steady
Independent	1	358	0.21%	0	0	0	0	Steady
Write-in		4,319	2.54%					
Total		169,907	100%	60				
Source: Secretary of State

== Summary by district ==
† = incumbent who did not seek re-election
Italics = non-incumbent
Bold = district flipped from one party to the other

District	Incumbent	Party	Elected Representative	Party
1st	Chip Neiman	Rep	Troy Claycomb	Rep
2nd	J. D. Williams	Rep	J. D. Williams	Rep
3rd	Abby Angelos	Rep	Earl Collier	Rep
4th	Jeremy Haroldson	Rep	Jeremy Haroldson	Rep
5th	Scott Smith	Rep	Joe Speckner	Rep
6th	Tomi Strock	Rep	Tomi Strock	Rep
7th	Bob Nicholas	Rep	Bob Nicholas	Rep
8th	Steve Johnson	Rep	Luke Reiner	Rep
9th	Landon Brown	Rep	Boyd Wiggam	Rep
10th	Justin Fornstrom	Rep	Justin Fornstrom	Rep
11th	Jacob Wasserburger	Rep	**Britney Tennant**	**Dem**
12th	Clarence Styvar	Rep	Clarence Styvar	Rep
13th	Ken Chestek	Dem	Ken Chestek	Dem
14th	Trey Sherwood	Dem	Trey Sherwood	Dem
15th	Pam Thayer	Rep	Pam Thayer	Rep
16th	Mike Yin	Dem	Mike Yin	Dem
17th	J.T. Larson	Rep	Elizabeth Bingham	Rep
18th	Scott Heiner	Rep	Kenneth Roberts	Rep
19th	Joe Webb	Rep	Chad Stephens	Rep
20th	Mike Schmid	Rep	Albert Sommers	Rep
21st	McKay Erickson	Rep	McKay Erickson	Rep
22nd	Andrew Byron	Rep	Andrew Byron	Rep
23rd	Liz Storer	Dem	Liz Storer	Dem
24th	Nina Webber	Rep	Quin Blair	Rep
25th	Paul Hoeft	Rep	John Wetzel	Rep
26th	Dalton Banks	Rep	Dalton Banks	Rep
27th	Martha Lawley	Rep	Martha Lawley	Rep
28th	John Winter	Rep	Allen Hogg	Rep
29th	Ken Pendergraft	Rep	Myca Sturtevant	Rep
30th	Tom Kelly	Rep	Ryan Koltiska	Rep
31st	John Bear	Rep	Douglas Moore	Rep
32nd	Ken Clouston	Rep	Ken Clouston	Rep
33rd	Ivan Posey	Dem	Ivan Posey	Dem
34th	Pepper Ottman	Rep	Pepper Ottman	Rep
35th	Tony Locke	Rep	Christopher Dresang	Rep
36th	Art Washut	Rep	Art Washut	Rep
37th	Steve Harshman	Rep	Brian Costello	Rep
38th	Jayme Lien	Rep	Robert Hendry	Rep
39th	Cody Wylie	Rep	Cody Wylie	Rep
40th	Marilyn Connolly	Rep	Marilyn Connolly	Rep
41st	Gary Brown	Rep	Erin Edwards	Rep
42nd	Rob Geringer	Rep	Rob Geringer	Rep
43rd	Ann Lucas	Rep	Jessica Crowder	Rep
44th	Lee Filer	Rep	Lee Filer	Rep
45th	Karlee Provenza	Dem	Karlee Provenza	Dem
46th	Ocean Andrew	Rep	Cam Wright	Rep
47th	Bob Davis	Rep	Eamon O'Toole	Rep
48th	Darin McCann	Rep	James Wamsley	Rep
49th	Robert Wharff	Rep	David Walton	Rep
50th	Rachel Rodriguez-Williams	Rep	David Hill	Rep
51st	Laurie Bratten	Rep	Laurie Bratten	Rep
52nd	Reuben Tarver	Rep	Ronda Boller	Rep
53rd	Chris Knapp	Rep	Chris Knapp	Rep
54th	Lloyd Larsen	Rep	Lloyd Larsen	Rep
55th	Joel Guggenmos	Rep	Carl Manning	Rep
56th	Elissa Campbell	Rep	Elissa Campbell	Rep
57th	Julie Jarvis	Rep	Julie Jarvis	Rep
58th	Bill Allemand	Rep	Bill Allemand	Rep
59th	J. R. Riggins	Rep	J. R. Riggins	Rep
60th	Marlene Brady	Rep	Tony Niemiec	Rep
61st	Daniel Singh	Rep	Andrew Server	Rep
62nd	Kevin Campbell	Rep	Kevin Campbell	Rep

== Background ==
Both primary and general elections in the state use a plurality voting system to select candidates. Also known as first-past-the-post, a candidate only needs to win the most votes out of any candidate and does not need to attain an outright majority. Wyoming utilizes closed primaries, in which voters must be registered members of a political party to participate in a primary election. Voters have until 96 days before the primary to do so. Some Republican legislators have introduced a bill to create runoff elections for primaries, but has not succeeded.

== Retirements ==
=== Republicans ===
1. District 1: Chip Neiman is retiring to run for state senate.
2. District 3: Abby Angelos is retiring to run for state senate.
3. District 5: Scott Smith is retiring to run for state treasurer.
4. District 9: Landon Brown is retiring.
5. District 11: Jacob Wasserburger is retiring.
6. District 17: J.T. Larson is retiring.
7. District 20: Mike Schmid is retiring.
8. District 25: Paul Hoeft is retiring to run for state senate.
9. District 28: John Winter is retiring.
10. District 29: Ken Pendergraft is retiring to run for state senate.
11. District 30: Tom Kelly is retiring to run for superintendent of public instruction.
12. District 37: Steve Harshman is retiring to run for superintendent of public instruction.
13. District 47: Bob Davis is retiring to run for state senate.
14. District 30: Rachel Rodriguez-Williams is retiring to run for secretary of state.
15. District 52: Reuben Tarver is retiring.
16. District 55: Joel Guggenmos is retiring.
17. District 61: Daniel Singh is retiring to run for state senate.

== Incumbents defeated ==
=== In primary elections ===
==== Republicans ====
1. District 8: Steve Johnson lost renomination to Luke Reiner.
2. District 18: Scott Heiner lost renomination to Kenneth Roberts.
3. District 19: Joe Webb lost renomination to Chad Stephens.
4. District 24: Nina Webber lost renomination to Quin Blair.
5. District 31: John Bear lost renomination to Douglas Moore.
6. District 35: Tony Locke lost renomination to Christopher Dresang.
7. District 38: Jayme Lien lost renomination to Rob Hendry.
8. District 41: Gary Brown lost renomination to Erin Edwards.
9. District 43: Ann Lucas lost renomination to Jessica Crowder.
10. District 46: Ocean Andrew lost renomination to Cam Wright.
11. District 48: Darin McCann lost renomination to James Wamsley.
12. District 49: Robert Wharff lost renomination to David Walton.
13. District 60: Marlene Brady lost renomination to Tony Niemiec.

== Predictions ==
Source	Ranking	As of
Sabato's Crystal Ball	Safe R	January 22, 2026
State Navigate	Safe R	October 24, 2026

== Detailed results ==
=== District 1 ===
In 2024, Republican Representative Chip Neiman won re-election to a third term.

==== Republican primary ====
===== Candidates =====
====== Declared ======
- Troy Claycomb, small business owner
- Zeta Anderson, Crook County GOP vice chair

====== Declined ======
- Chip Neiman, incumbent representative (2021-present) (running for State Senate)

=== District 2 ===
In 2024, incumbent Republican Representative J. D. Williams won re-election to a second, non-consecutive term.

==== Republican primary ====
===== Candidates =====
====== Declared ======
- J. D. Williams, incumbent Representative

=== District 3 ===
In 2024, incumbent Republican Representative Abby Angelos won re-election to a second term.

==== Republican primary ====
===== Candidates =====
====== Declared ======
- Anne Ziegenhorn, former candidate for Wright town council
- Earl Collier, land surveyor

====== Declined ======
- Abby Angelos, incumbent Representative (running for state senate)

=== District 4 ===
In 2024, incumbent Republican Representative Jeremy Haroldson won re-election to a third term.

==== Republican primary ====
===== Candidates =====
====== Declared ======
- Jeremy Haroldson, incumbent Representative

=== District 5 ===
In 2024, incumbent Republican Representative Scott Smith won re-election to a second term.

==== Republican primary ====
===== Candidates =====
====== Declared ======
- Joe Speckner, lawyer
- Karen Weber

====== Declined ======
- Scott Smith, incumbent Representative

=== District 6 ===
In 2024, Republican Representative Tomi Strock won re-election to a twelfth term.

==== Republican primary ====
===== Candidates =====
====== Declared ======
- Jim Willox, Converse County commissioner (2007-present)
- Tomi Strock, incumbent Representative

=== District 7 ===
In 2024, incumbent Republican Representative Bob Nicholas won re-election to an eighth term.

==== Republican primary ====
===== Candidates =====
====== Declared ======
- Bob Nicholas, incumbent Representative
- Deb Mutter Shamley, member of the Wyoming Public Charter Schools Association

==== Democratic primary ====
===== Candidates =====
====== Declared ======
- Gavin Lobmeyer, director of speakers at Cheyenne Young Professionals

=== District 8 ===
In 2024, Republican Steve Johnson defeated incumbent Republican David Zwonitzer.

==== Republican primary ====
===== Candidates =====
====== Declared ======
- Steve Johnson, incumbent Representative
- Luke Reiner, former director of the Wyoming Department of Transportation (2019-2023)

==== Democratic primary ====
===== Candidates =====
====== Declared ======
- Brenda Lyttle, attorney

=== District 9 ===
In 2024, incumbent Republican Representative Landon Brown won re-election to a fifth term.

==== Republican primary ====
===== Candidates =====
====== Declared ======
- Boyd Wiggam, attorney
- Exie Brown, veteran

====== Declined ======
- Landon Brown, incumbent Representative

==== Democratic primary ====
===== Candidates =====
====== Declared ======
- Stephen Latham, former candidate for Cheyenne city council

=== District 10 ===
In 2024, incumbent Republican Representative John Eklund Jr. won re-election to an eighth term. He died in 2025. He was succeeded by Justin Fornstrom

==== Republican primary ====
===== Candidates =====
====== Declared ======
- Justin Fornstrom, incumbent Representative
- Kelly Bates

=== District 11 ===
In 2024, Republican Jacob Wasserburger won the election.

==== Republican primary ====
===== Candidates =====
====== Declared ======
- Dan McIntosh
- Paul Wing, veteran

====== Declined ======
- Jacob Wasserburger, incumbent Representative

==== Democratic primary ====
===== Candidates =====
====== Declared ======
- Britney Tennant, animal welfare advocate

=== District 12 ===
In 2024, incumbent Republican Representative Clarence Styvar won re-election to a fourth full term.

==== Republican primary ====
===== Candidates =====
====== Declared ======
- Clarence Styvar, incumbent Representative

=== District 13 ===
In 2024, incumbent Democratic Representative Ken Chestek won re-election to a second term.

==== Democratic primary ====
===== Candidates =====
====== Declared ======
- Ken Chestek, incumbent Representative

==== Republican primary ====
===== Candidates =====
====== Declared ======
- Shane Swett, nominee for this district in 2024

=== District 14 ===
In 2024, incumbent Democratic Representative Trey Sherwood won re-election to a third full term.

==== Democratic primary ====
===== Candidates =====
====== Declared ======
- Trey Sherwood, incumbent Representative

==== Republican primary ====
===== Candidates =====
====== Declared ======
- Emily Study, veterans' service officer

=== District 15 ===
In 2024, Republican Pam Thayer won the election.

==== Republican primary ====
===== Candidates =====
====== Declared ======
- Pam Thayer, incumbent Representative

=== District 16 ===
In 2024, incumbent Democratic Representative Mike Yin won re-election to a second full term.

==== Democratic primary ====
===== Candidates =====
====== Declared ======
- Mike Yin, incumbent Representative

=== District 17 ===
In 2024, Republican Representative J.T. Larson won re-election to a second full term.

==== Republican primary ====
===== Candidates =====
====== Declared ======
- Elizabeth Bingham, chair of the Sweetwater County GOP

====== Declined ======
- J.T. Larson, incumbent Representative

==== Democratic primary ====
===== Candidates =====
====== Declared ======
- Rah Reinholz, activist

=== District 18 ===
In 2024, incumbent Republican Representative Scott Heiner won re-election to a third term.

==== Republican primary ====
===== Candidates =====
====== Declared ======
- Scott Heiner, incumbent Representative
- Kenneth Roberts, court clerk and former president of the Wyoming Game and Fish Commission (2022-2023)

=== District 19 ===
In 2024, Republican Joe Webb defeated incumbent Republican Representative Jon Conrad in the primary.

==== Republican primary ====
===== Candidates =====
====== Declared ======
- Chad Stephens
- Joe Webb, incumbent Representative

=== District 20 ===
In 2024, Republican Mike Schmid won the election.

==== Republican primary ====
===== Candidates =====
====== Declared ======
- Albert Sommers, member of the Wyoming House of Representatives (2013-2025)
- Bill Winney, veteran
- Matt McGinnis

====== Declined ======
- Mike Schmid, incumbent Representative

=== District 21 ===
In 2024, Republican McKay Erickson won the election.

==== Republican primary ====
===== Candidates =====
====== Declared ======
- McKay Erickson, incumbent Representative

=== District 22 ===
In 2024, incumbent Republican Representative Andrew Byron won re-election to a second term.

==== Republican primary ====
===== Candidates =====
====== Declared ======
- Andrew Byron, incumbent Representative

=== District 23 ===
In 2024, incumbent Democratic Representative Liz Storer won re-election to a second term.

==== Democratic primary ====
===== Candidates =====
====== Declared ======
- Liz Storer, incumbent Representative

==== Republican primary ====
===== Candidates =====
====== Declared ======
- Shannon Brennan, energy and environmental consultant

=== District 24 ===
In 2024, incumbent Republican Representative Nina Webber won the election.

==== Republican primary ====
===== Candidates =====
====== Declared ======
- Nina Webber, incumbent Representative
- Quintin Blair, businessman

=== District 25 ===
In 2024, incumbent Republican Representative Paul Hoeft defeated incumbent Representative and Speaker David Northrup .

==== Republican primary ====
===== Candidates =====
====== Declared ======
- John Wetzel, mayor of Powell
- Matthew Legler, veteran and policy analyst

====== Declined ======
- Paul Hoeft, incumbent Representative (running for state senate)

=== District 26 ===
In 2024, incumbent Republican Representative Dalton Banks won re-election to a second term.

==== Republican primary ====
===== Candidates =====
====== Declared ======
- Dalton Banks, incumbent Representative
- J. Addison Aagard

=== District 27 ===
In 2024, incumbent Republican Representative Martha Lawley won re-election to a second term.

==== Republican primary ====
===== Candidates =====
====== Declared ======
- Martha Lawley, incumbent Representative

==== Democratic primary ====
===== Candidates =====
====== Declared ======
- Theresa Livingston, candidate for governor of Wyoming in 2022

=== District 28 ===
In 2024, incumbent Republican Representative John Winter won re-election to a fourth term.

==== Republican primary ====
===== Candidates =====
====== Declared ======
- Allen Hogg, rancher
- Carlin Jones, rancher
- Marshall Keller, rancher and veteran
- Roland Luehne, owner of the Star Plunge pool

====== Declined ======
- John Winter, incumbent Representative

=== District 29 ===
In 2024, incumbent Republican Representative Ken Pendergraft won re-election to a third term.

==== Republican primary ====
===== Candidates =====
====== Declared ======
- James Temple, chair of the Sheridan County GOP
- Myca Sturtevant, small business owner
- Noll Roberts, activist

====== Declined ======
- Ken Pendergraft, incumbent Representative (running for state senate)

=== District 30 ===
In 2024, incumbent Republican Representative Tom Kelly won re-election to a second term.

==== Republican primary ====
===== Candidates =====
====== Declared ======
- Mark Jennings, former Representative (2015-2025)
- Ryan Koltiska, business manager

====== Declined ======
- Tom Kelly, incumbent Representative (Running for Superintendent of Public Instruction)

=== District 31 ===
In 2024, incumbent Republican Representative John Bear won re-election to a third term.

==== Republican primary ====
===== Candidates =====
====== Declared ======
- John Bear, incumbent Representative
- Douglas Moore, manager

=== District 32 ===
In 2024, incumbent Republican Representative Ken Clouston won re-election to a second term.

==== Republican primary ====
===== Candidates =====
====== Declared ======
- Ken Clouston, incumbent Representative

=== District 33 ===
In 2024, Democrat Ivan Posey defeated incumbent Republican Sarah Penn.

==== Democratic primary ====
===== Candidates =====
====== Declared ======
- Ivan Posey, incumbent Representative

=== District 34 ===
In 2024, incumbent Republican Representative Pepper Ottman won re-election to a third term.

==== Republican primary ====
===== Candidates =====
====== Declared ======
- Pepper Ottman, incumbent Representative

=== District 35 ===
In 2024, Republican Tony Locke won re-election to a second term.

==== Republican primary ====
===== Candidates =====
====== Declared ======
- Tony Locke, incumbent Representative
- Christopher Dresang, public school administrator

=== District 36 ===
In 2024, incumbent Republican Representative Art Washut won re-election to a fourth term.

==== Republican primary ====
===== Candidates =====
====== Declared ======
- Art Washut, incumbent Representative

==== Democratic primary ====
===== Candidates =====
====== Declared ======
- Stewart McAdoo, operations director

=== District 37 ===
In 2024, incumbent Republican Representative Steve Harshman won re-election to a twelfth term.

==== Republican primary ====
===== Candidates =====
====== Declared ======
- Brian Costello, teacher
- Donna Rice, candidate for US Senate in 2020
- Ross Schriftman, Natrona County GOP committeeman and insurance agent

====== Declined ======
- Steve Harshman, incumbent Representative

==== Democratic primary ====
===== Candidates =====
====== Declared ======
- Betty Erickson, communications worker at WyoUnited

=== District 38 ===
In 2024, Republican Jayme Lien defeated incumbent Republican Representative Tom Walters.

==== Republican primary ====
===== Candidates =====
====== Declared ======
- Jayme Lien, incumbent Representative
- Robert Hendry, candidate for state senate in 2024

==== Democratic primary ====
===== Candidates =====
====== Declared ======
- Catherine McQueen, precinct committeewoman

=== District 39 ===
In 2024, incumbent Republican Representative Cody Wylie won re-election to a second term.

==== Republican primary ====
===== Candidates =====
====== Declared ======
- Cody Wylie, incumbent Representative

=== District 40 ===
In 2024, Republican Marilyn Connolly the election.

==== Democratic primary ====
===== Candidates =====
====== Declared ======
- Marilyn Connolly, incumbent Representative
- Mark Jones, candidate for this district in 2024

=== District 41 ===
In 2024, Republican Gary Brown defeated incumbent Bill Henderson.

==== Republican primary ====
===== Candidates =====
====== Declared ======
- Gary Brown, incumbent Representative
- Erin Edwards, volunteer firefighter

=== District 42 ===
In 2024, Republican Rob Geringer defeated incumbent Ben Hornok.

==== Republican primary ====
===== Candidates =====
====== Declared ======
- Rob Geringer, incumbent Representative

==== Democratic primary ====
===== Candidates =====
====== Declared ======
- Jim VanDyke, financial advisor

=== District 43 ===
In 2024, Republican Ann Lucas defeated incumbent Republican Dan Zwonitzer.

==== Republican primary ====
===== Candidates =====
====== Declared ======
- Ann Lucas, incumbent Representative
- Jessica Crowder, rancher

=== District 44 ===
In 2024, Republican Lee Filer defeated incumbent Republican Tamara Trujillo to win re-election to a second non-consecutive term.

==== Republican primary ====
===== Candidates =====
====== Declared ======
- Lee Filer, incumbent Representative

=== District 45 ===
In 2024, incumbent Democratic Representative Karlee Provenza won re-election to a third term.

==== Democratic primary ====
===== Candidates =====
====== Declared ======
- Karlee Provenza, incumbent Representative

==== Republican primary ====
===== Candidates =====
====== Declared ======
- Ross Davenport

=== District 46 ===
In 2024, incumbent Republican Representative Ocean Andrew won re-election to a third term.

==== Republican primary ====
===== Candidates =====
====== Declared ======
- Ocean Andrew, incumbent Representative
- Cam Wright, veteran, engineer, and educator
- RJ Lennox, candidate for this district in 2022

==== Democratic primary ====
===== Candidates =====
====== Declared ======
- Gary Wilken, law enforcement official

=== District 47 ===
In 2024, incumbent Republican Representative Bob Davis won re-election to a second term.

==== Republican primary ====
===== Candidates =====
====== Declared ======
- Eamon O'Toole, rancher

====== Declined ======
- Bob Davis, incumbent Representative (running for state senate)

=== District 48 ===
In 2024, Republican Darin McCann defeated incumbent Republican Clark Stith.

==== Republican primary ====
===== Candidates =====
====== Declared ======
- Darin McCann, incumbent Representative
- James Wamsley, public servant

=== District 49 ===
In 2024, Republican Robert Wharff defeated incumbent Republican Ryan Berger.

==== Republican primary ====
===== Candidates =====
====== Declared ======
- Robert Wharff, incumbent Representative
- David Walton

=== District 50 ===
In 2024, Republican Representative Rachel Rodriguez-Williams won re-election to a third term.

==== Republican primary ====
===== Candidates =====
====== Declared ======
- David Hill, attorney and president of the Cody Country Chamber of Commerce
- Levi Asay, healthcare practitioner

====== Declined ======
- Rachel Rodriguez-Williams, incumbent Representative (running for Secretary of State)

=== District 51 ===
In 2024, Republican Laurie Bratten won the election.

==== Republican primary ====
===== Candidates =====
====== Declared ======
- Laurie Bratten, incumbent Representative
- Susan Bigelow

=== District 52 ===
In 2024, incumbent Republican Representative Reuben Tarver won re-election to a second term.

==== Republican primary ====
===== Candidates =====
====== Declared ======
- Bill Fortner, former member of the Wyoming House of Representatives (2021-2023)
- Ronda Boller, nurse

====== Declined ======
- Reuben Tarver, incumbent Representative

=== District 53 ===
In 2024, incumbent Republican Representative Chris Knapp won re-election to a third full term.

==== Republican primary ====
===== Candidates =====
====== Declared ======
- Chris Knapp, incumbent Representative
- Greg Schreurs, candidate for Gillette city council in 2024

=== District 54 ===
In 2024, incumbent Republican Representative Lloyd Charles Larsen won re-election to a seventh term.

==== Republican primary ====
===== Candidates =====
====== Declared ======
- Lloyd Charles Larsen, incumbent Representative
- Jeff Martin, candidate for this district in 2022

=== District 55 ===
In 2024, Republican Joel Guggenmos defeated incumbent Republican Ember Oakley.

==== Republican primary ====
===== Candidates =====
====== Declared ======
- Carl Manning, member of Fremont County School District #25 Board of Trustees

====== Declined ======
- Joel Guggenmos, incumbent Representative

=== District 56 ===
In 2024, Republican Elissa Campbell won the election.

==== Republican primary ====
===== Candidates =====
====== Declared ======
- Elissa Campbell, incumbent Representative
- Pete Fox, retiree

=== District 57 ===
In 2024, Republican Julie Jarvis defeated incumbent Republican Jeanette Ward.

==== Republican primary ====
===== Candidates =====
====== Declared ======
- Julie Jarvis, incumbent Representative
- Jeanette Ward, former member of the Wyoming House of Representatives (2023-2025)

==== Democratic primary ====
===== Candidates =====
====== Declared ======
- Luc Colgrove, entrepreneur

=== District 58 ===
In 2024, incumbent Republican Representative Bill Allemand won re-election to a second full term.

==== Republican primary ====
===== Candidates =====
====== Declared ======
- Bill Allemand, incumbent Representative
- Peter Boyter, mayor of Bar Nunn

==== Democratic primary ====
===== Candidates =====
====== Declared ======
- Keenan Morgan

=== District 59 ===
In 2024, Republican J. R. Riggins won the election.

==== Republican primary ====
===== Candidates =====
====== Declared ======
- J. R. Riggins, incumbent Representative
- Neil Jeske, truck drive

==== Democratic primary ====
===== Candidates =====
====== Declared ======
- Laurie Longtine, property owner

=== District 60 ===
In 2024, Republican Marlene Brady defeated incumbent Republican Tony Niemiec.

==== Republican primary ====
===== Candidates =====
====== Declared ======
- Marlene Brady, incumbent Representative
- Tony Niemiec, former member of the Wyoming House of Representatives (2023-2025)

=== District 61 ===
In 2024, incumbent Republican Representative Daniel Singh won re-election to a second term.

==== Republican primary ====
===== Candidates =====
====== Declared ======
- Andrew Sever
- Seth Bard

====== Declined ======
- Daniel Singh, incumbent Representative (running for state senate)

=== District 62 ===
In 2024, Republican Kevin Campbell won the election.

==== Republican primary ====
===== Candidates =====
====== Potential ======
- Kevin Campbell, incumbent Representative
- Edis Allen, veteran

== See also ==
- List of Wyoming legislatures
