= List of Wyoming House of Representatives districts =

The U.S. state of Wyoming has two chambers in its state legislature. Its lower chamber, the Wyoming House of Representatives, has currently 62 single-member districts.

The Wyoming Constitution originally mandated a county-based apportionment scheme. Previously, the state legislature had a mixed system, with both multi-member districts and single-member districts. The state House specifically had 15 multi-member districts and 8 single-member districts in the 1990 apportionment plan. In a 1991 federal legal case, Gorin v. Karpan, the court ruled the 1990 apportionment plan was unconstitutional. The ruling determined the district map "created unconstitutionally excessive percentage deviations from the equal population principle" established by the United States Supreme Court's interpretation of the Equal Protection Clause of the Fourteenth Amendment in the landmark 1964 case Reynolds v. Sims.

On February 21, 1992, in response to the ruling in Gorin, the state legislature enacted a new apportionment plan, with a new district scheme. The plan replaced the mixed system with a purely single-member district based system. The state House had 60 districts, with two state House districts nested in each one of the state Senate districts. The new districts were drawn without respect to county borders.

In the 2022 apportionment plan for the state legislature, there were two more state House districts added to the map.

== List of current legislative districts ==
The following is a list of districts in the Wyoming House of Representatives.

No.	Map	Counties	Party	Member
1st		Crook; Weston	Rep.	Chip Neiman
2nd		Goshen; Niobrara; Weston	Rep.	J. D. Williams
3rd		Campbell	Rep.	Abby Angelos
4th		Laramie; Platte	Rep.	Jeremy Haroldson
5th		Goshen	Rep.	Scott Smith
6th		Converse	Rep.	Tomi Strock
7th		Laramie	Rep.	Bob Nicholas
8th		Laramie	Rep.	Steve Johnson
9th		Laramie	Rep.	Landon Brown
10th		Laramie	Rep.	Justin Fornstrom
11th		Laramie	Rep.	Jacob Wasserburger
12th		Laramie	Rep.	Clarence Styvar
13th		Albany	Dem.	Ken Chestek
14th		Albany	Dem.	Trey Sherwood
15th		Carbon; Sweetwater	Rep.	Pam Thayer
16th		Teton	Dem.	Mike Yin
17th		Sweetwater	Rep.	J.T. Larson
18th		Lincoln; Sweetwater; Uinta	Rep.	Scott Heiner
19th		Uinta	Rep.	Joe Webb
20th		Lincoln; Sublette	Rep.	Mike Schmid
21st		Lincoln	Rep.	McKay Erickson
22nd		Lincoln; Teton	Rep.	Andrew Byron
23rd		Teton	Dem.	Liz Storer
24th		Park	Rep.	Nina Webber
25th		Park	Rep.	Paul Hoeft
26th		Big Horn; Park	Rep.	Dalton Banks
27th		Big Horn; Washakie	Rep.	Martha Lawley
28th		Big Horn; Fremont; Hot Springs; Park	Rep.	John Winter
29th		Sheridan	Rep.	Ken Pendergraft
30th		Sheridan	Rep.	Tom Kelly
31st		Campbell	Rep.	John Bear
32nd		Campbell	Rep.	Ken Clouston
33rd		Fremont	Dem.	Ivan Posey
34th		Fremont	Rep.	Pepper Ottman
35th		Natrona	Rep.	Tony Locke
36th		Natrona	Rep.	Art Washut
37th		Natrona	Rep.	Steve Harshman
38th		Natrona	Rep.	Jayme Lien
39th		Sweetwater	Rep.	Cody Wylie
40th		Johnson; Sheridan	Rep.	Marilyn Connolly
41st		Laramie	Rep.	Gary Brown
42nd		Laramie	Rep.	Rob Geringer
43rd		Laramie	Rep.	Ann Lucas
44th		Laramie	Rep.	Lee Filer
45th		Albany	Dem.	Karlee Provenza
46th		Albany	Rep.	Ocean Andrew
47th		Carbon; Sweetwater	Rep.	Bob Davis
48th		Sweetwater	Rep.	Darin McCann
49th		Uinta	Rep.	Robert Wharff
50th		Park	Rep.	Rachel Rodriguez-Williams
51st		Sheridan	Rep.	Laurie Bratten
52nd		Campbell	Rep.	Reuben Tarver
53rd		Campbell	Rep.	Chris Knapp
54th		Fremont	Rep.	Lloyd Larsen
55th		Fremont	Rep.	Joel Guggenmos
56th		Natrona	Rep.	Elissa Campbell
57th		Natrona	Rep.	Julie Jarvis
58th		Natrona	Rep.	Bill Allemand
59th		Natrona	Rep.	J.R. Riggins
60th		Sweetwater	Rep.	Marlene Brady
61st		Laramie	Rep.	Daniel Singh
62nd		Converse; Natrona	Rep.	Kevin Campbell

== See also ==
- List of Wyoming Senate districts
