= 2024 Wyoming House of Representatives election =

- November 5, 2024

All 62 seats in the Wyoming House of Representatives 32 seats needed for a majority
	Majority party	Minority party
Leader	Albert Sommers (retired)	Mike Yin
Party	Republican	Democratic
Leader since	January 10, 2023	January 10, 2023
Leader's seat	20th	16th
Last election	76.7%, 57 seats	12.7%, 5 seats
Seats before	57	5
Seats won	56	6
Seat change	▼1	▲1
Popular vote	197,212	28,497
Percentage	83.39%	12.05%
- Republican hold Democratic gain Democratic hold
Speaker before election
Albert Sommers
Republican
Elected Speaker
Chip Neiman
Republican

The 2024 Wyoming House of Representatives election was held on November 5, 2024, to elect members of the Wyoming Legislature for its 68th session. Partisan primaries were held on August 20. Part of the 2024 United States elections, the election was held alongside races for state senate, U.S. House, U.S. Senate, and the presidential election.

The Wyoming Freedom Caucus won enough primaries to gain control of the state house for the first time, and Democrats flipped a single seat in the legislature in the general election. Representative Chip Neiman, a member of the Wyoming Freedom Caucus, has declared his intent to run for Speaker of the House, and is unopposed as of November 14.

== Summary ==
Summary of the 2024 Wyoming House of Representatives election results
Party	Candidates	Votes	%	Seats		
Party	Candidates	Votes	%	Before 67th Leg.	Won 68th Leg.	+/–
Republican	60	197,212	83.39	57	56	▼1
Democratic	16	28,497	12.05	5	6	▲1
Independents	1	865	0.37	0	0	Steady
Write-in		9,929	4.20	—		
Valid ballots		236,503	87.23	—		
Blank or invalid ballots		34,620	12.77	—		
Total		271,123	100%	62		Steady

Popular vote
Republican	83.39%
Democratic	12.05%
Independents	0.37%
Write-ins	4.20%

Seats won
Republican	90.32%
Democratic	9.68%

=== Close races ===
District	Winner	Margin
District 11	Republican	9%
District 13	Democratic	6.2%
District 14	Democratic	4%
District 41	Republican	4.8%

== Partisan background ==
This depicts how each of Wyoming's 62 House of Representatives districts voted in the 2020 Presidential Election. Republican Donald Trump received the most votes in 57 districts, and Democrat Joe Biden received the most votes in 5 districts.

Biden 40–50% 50–60% 60-70% 70-80% / Trump 50–60% 60–70% 70–80% 80–90% 90–100%

== Predictions ==
Source	Ranking	As of
CNalysis	Solid R	June 13, 2024

== Retirements ==
Eleven incumbents did not seek re-election.

=== Republicans ===
- District 11: Jared Olsen retired to run for State Senate.
- District 15: Donald Burkhart retired.
- District 20: Albert Sommers retired to run for State Senate.
- District 21: Lane Allred retired.
- District 24: Sandy Newsome retired.
- District 30: Mark Jennings retired to run for State Senate.
- District 40: Barry Crago retired to run for State Senate.
- District 51: Cyrus Western retired.
- District 56: Jerry Obermueller retired.
- District 59: Kevin O'Hearn retired.
- District 62: Forrest Chadwick retired.

== Incumbents defeated ==
=== In primary election ===
Fourteen incumbent representatives, all Republicans, were defeated in the August 20 primary election.

==== Republicans ====
- District 2: Allen Slagle lost renomination to J. D. Williams.
- District 8: David Zwonitzer lost renomination to Steve Johnson.
- District 19: Jon Conrad lost renomination to Joseph Webb.
- District 25: David Northrup lost renomination to Paul Hoeft.
- District 38: Tom Walters lost renomination to Jayme Lien.
- District 41: Bill Henderson lost renomination to Gary Brown.
- District 42: Ben Hornok lost renomination to Rob Geringer.
- District 43: Dan Zwonitzer lost renomination to Ann Lucas.
- District 44: Tamara Trujillo lost renomination to Lee Filer.
- District 48: Clark Stith lost renomination to Darin McCann.
- District 49: Ryan Berger lost renomination to Robert Wharff.
- District 55: Ember Oakley lost renomination to Joel Guggenmos.
- District 57: Jeanette Ward lost renomination to Julie Jarvis.
- District 60: Tony Niemiec lost renomination to Marlene Brady.

=== In general election ===
One incumbent representative was defeated in the November 5 general election.

- District 33: Republican Sarah Penn lost the election to Democrat Ivan Posey.

== Detailed results ==
=== General election ===
To ease sorting, races won by a Republican candidate have a positive margin, while races won by Democratic candidates have negative margins.

District	Republicans			Democrats			Independents			Write-ins		Total
District	Candidate	Vote	%	Candidate	Vote	%	Candidate	Vote	%	Vote	%	Total	Maj.	%
1	Chip Neiman	5,096	97.62	—	—	—	—	—	—	124	2.38	5,220	+4,972	+95.25
2	JD Williams	3,834	93.92	—	—	—	—	—	—	248	6.08	4,082	+3,586	+87.85
3	Abby Angelos	3,753	99.05	—	—	—	—	—	—	36	0.95	3,789	+3,717	+98.10
4	Jeremy Haroldson	3,516	76.27	Charles Randolph	1,014	22.00	—	—	—	80	1.74	4,610	+2,502	+54.27
5	Scott Smith	3,893	92.78	—	—	—	—	—	—	303	7.22	4,196	+3,590	+85.56
6	Tomi Strock	3,742	92.81	—	—	—	—	—	—	290	7.19	4,032	+3,452	+85.62
7	Bob Nicholas	2,791	64.91	Jordan Evans	1,456	33.86	—	—	—	53	1.23	4,300	+1,335	+31.05
8	Steve Johnson	4,229	92.46	—	—	—	—	—	—	345	7.54	4,574	+3,884	+84.91
9	Landon J. Brown	3,453	92.60	—	—	—	—	—	—	276	7.40	3,729	+3,177	+85.20
10	John Eklund	3,963	81.43	—	—	—	Tim Forbis	865	17.77	39	0.80	4,867	+3,098	+63.65
11	Jacob Wasserburger	1,774	54.27	Sara Burlingame	1,482	45.33	—	—	—	13	0.40	3,269	+292	+8.93
12	Clarence Styvar	2,252	94.19	—	—	—	—	—	—	139	5.81	2,391	+2,113	+88.37
13	Shane Swett	1,718	46.88	Ken Chestek	1,941	52.96	—	—	—	6	0.16	3,665	-223	-6.08
14	Joe Giustozzi	2,279	47.89	Trey Sherwood	2,472	51.94	—	—	—	8	0.17	4,759	-193	-4.06
15	Pam Thayer	2,790	96.64	—	—	—	—	—	—	97	3.36	2,887	+2,693	+93.28
16	—	—	—	Mike Yin	3,545	96.70	—	—	—	121	3.30	3,666	-3,424	-93.40
17	J.T. Larson	2,590	95.50	—	—	—	—	—	—	122	4.50	2,712	+2,468	+91.00
18	Scott Heiner	3,781	97.05	—	—	—	—	—	—	115	2.95	3,896	+3,666	+94.10
19	Joe Webb	3,012	76.64	—	—	—	—	—	—	918	23.36	3,930	+2,094	+53.28
20	Mike Schmid	4,354	94.94	—	—	—	—	—	—	232	5.06	4,586	+4,122	+89.88
21	McKay L. Erickson	4,947	99.04	—	—	—	—	—	—	48	0.96	4,995	+4,899	+98.08
22	Andrew P. Byron	4,189	96.77	—	—	—	—	—	—	140	3.23	4,329	+4,049	+93.53
23	—	—	—	Liz Storer	4,434	95.09	—	—	—	229	4.91	4,663	-4,205	-90.18
24	Nina Webber	3,372	81.71	—	—	—	—	—	—	755	18.29	4,127	+2,617	+63.41
25	Paul Hoeft	3,673	93.87	—	—	—	—	—	—	240	6.13	3,913	+3,433	+87.73
26	Dalton Banks	3,942	97.53	—	—	—	—	—	—	100	2.47	4,042	+3,842	+95.05
27	Martha Lawley	3,918	97.39	—	—	—	—	—	—	105	2.61	4,023	+3,813	+94.78
28	John Winter	3,986	82.10	Larry Alwin	857	17.65	—	—	—	12	0.25	4,855	+3,129	+64.45
29	Ken Pendergraft	3,009	69.06	Martha J. Wright	1,325	30.41	—	—	—	23	0.53	4,357	+1,684	+38.65
30	Tom Kelly	3,944	96.50	—	—	—	—	—	—	143	3.50	4,087	+3,801	+93.00
31	John Bear	2,726	95.92	—	—	—	—	—	—	116	4.08	2,842	+2,610	+91.84
32	Ken L. Clouston	3,342	96.81	—	—	—	—	—	—	110	3.19	3,452	+3,232	+93.63
33	Sarah Pen	1,210	41.75	Ivan Posey	1,675	57.80	—	—	—	13	0.45	2,898	-465	-16.05
34	Pepper L. Ottman	4,117	97.26	—	—	—	—	—	—	116	2.74	4,233	+4,001	+94.52
35	Tony Locke	3,409	93.37	—	—	—	—	—	—	242	6.63	3,651	+3,167	+86.74
36	Art Washut	2,727	97.01	—	—	—	—	—	—	84	2.99	2,811	+2,643	+94.02
37	Steve Harshman	4,004	95.61	—	—	—	—	—	—	184	4.39	4,188	+3,820	+91.21
38	Jayme Lein	3,253	95.65	—	—	—	—	—	—	148	4.35	3,401	+3,105	+91.30
39	Cody Wylie	2,966	96.49	—	—	—	—	—	—	108	3.51	3,074	+2,858	+92.97
40	Marilyn Connolly	4,806	95.04	—	—	—	—	—	—	251	4.96	5,057	+4,555	+90.07
41	Gary Brown	2,039	52.19	Jen Solis	1,852	47.40	—	—	—	16	0.41	3,907	+187	+4.79
42	Rob Geringer	3,270	77.69	Bob Ray	853	20.27	—	—	—	86	2.04	4,209	+2,417	+57.42
43	Ann Lucas	3,540	91.85	—	—	—	—	—	—	314	8.15	3,854	+3,226	+83.71
44	Lee Filer	2,265	93.60	—	—	—	—	—	—	155	6.40	2,420	+2,110	+87.19
45	Paul Crouch	1,477	37.07	Karlee Provenza	2,493	62.58	—	—	—	14	0.35	3,984	-1,016	-25.50
46	Ocean Andrew	3,411	69.47	Chris Lowry	1,481	30.16	—	—	—	18	0.37	4,910	+1,930	+39.31
47	Bob Davis	3,488	83.65	James A. Wislon	666	15.97	—	—	—	16	0.38	4,170	+2,822	+67.67
48	Darin M. McCann	2,715	96.48	—	—	—	—	—	—	99	3.52	2,814	+2,616	+92.96
49	Robert Wharff	3,046	89.85	—	—	—	—	—	—	344	10.15	3,390	+2,702	+79.71
50	Rachel Rodriguez-Williams	4,510	94.55	—	—	—	—	—	—	260	5.45	4,770	+4,250	+89.10
51	Laurie Bratten	4,910	95.67	—	—	—	—	—	—	222	4.33	5,132	+4,688	+91.35
52	Reuben Tarver	3,402	98.78	—	—	—	—	—	—	42	1.22	3,444	+3,360	+97.56
53	Christopher R. Knapp	2,466	97.93	—	—	—	—	—	—	52	2.07	2,518	+2,414	+95.87
54	Lloyd Charles Larsen	3,821	91.15	—	—	—	—	—	—	371	8.85	4,192	+3,450	+82.30
55	Joel Guggenmos	2,858	88.73	—	—	—	—	—	—	363	11.27	3,221	+2,495	+77.46
56	Elissa Campbell	2,938	94.84	—	—	—	—	—	—	160	5.16	3,098	+2,778	+89.67
57	Julie Jarvis	2,405	92.32	—	—	—	—	—	—	200	7.68	2,605	+2,205	+84.64
58	Bill Allemand	3,055	96.98	—	—	—	—	—	—	95	3.02	3,150	+2,960	+93.97
59	J.R. Riggins	2,740	96.79	—	—	—	—	—	—	91	3.21	2,831	+2,649	+93.57
60	Marlene Brady	2,484	71.38	Carmen Whitehead	951	27.33	—	—	—	45	1.29	3,480	+1,533	+44.05
61	Daniel J. Singh	2,516	93.74	—	—	—	—	—	—	168	6.26	2,684	+2,348	+87.48
62	Kevin Campbell	3,496	98.15	—	—	—	—	—	—	66	1.85	3,562	+3,430	+96.29

=== Democratic primaries ===
Three candidates won Democratic nominations off the back of write-in votes in races for which no candidate filed. For the sake of brevity, races in which no candidate won the Democratic nomination will not be shown.

District	Winners			Write-ins		Total
District	Candidate	Vote	%	Vote	%	Total	Maj.	%
HD 4	Charles Randolph	162	97.59	4	2.41	166	158	95.18
HD 7	Jordan Evans	304	98.06	6	1.94	310	298	96.13
HD 11	Sarah Burlingame	285	98.96	3	1.04	288	282	97.92
HD 13	Ken Chestek	325	100.00	0	0.00	325	325	100.00
HD 14	Trey Sherwood	392	99.24	3	0.76	395	389	98.48
HD 16	Mike Yin	469	100.00	0	0.00	469	469	100.00
HD 23	Liz Storer	492	98.80	6	1.20	498	486	97.59
HD 28	Larry Alwin (write-in)	27	72.97	10	27.03	37	17	45.95
HD 29	Martha J. Wright (write-in)	54	79.41	14	20.59	68	40	58.82
HD 33	Ivan Posey	239	99.17	2	0.83	241	237	98.34
HD 41	Jen Solis	337	99.41	2	0.59	339	335	98.82
HD 42	Bob Ray	151	97.42	4	2.58	155	147	94.84
HD 45	Karlee Provenza	565	99.47	3	0.53	568	562	98.94
HD 46	Chris Lowry	275	98.57	4	1.43	279	271	97.13
HD 47	James A. Wislon	146	99.32	1	0.68	147	145	98.64
HD 60	Carmen Whitehead (write-in)	26	50.00	26	50.00	52	0	0.00

== District 1 ==
=== Republican primary ===
==== Nominee ====
- Chip Neiman, majority leader since 2023 and incumbent representative since 2021

==== Results ====
2024 Wyoming House of Representatives District 1 Republican primary
Party	Candidate	Votes	%
Republican	Chip Neiman (inc.)	2,255	97.07%
Write-in		68	2.92%
Valid ballots		2,323	89.48%
Invalid or blank votes		273	10.52%
Total votes		2,596	100.00%

=== Democratic primary ===
No candidate qualified for the Democratic primary. 4 write-in votes and 63 blank ballots were cast.

=== General election ===
2024 Wyoming House of Representatives District 1 general election
Party	Candidate	Votes	%
Republican	Chip Neiman (inc.)	5,096	97.62%
Write-in		124	2.38%
Valid ballots		5,220	89.52%
Invalid or blank votes		611	10.48%
Total votes		5,831	100.00%

== District 2 ==
=== Republican primary ===
==== Nominee ====
- J. D. Williams, former representative from this district (2021–2023)

==== Defeated in primary ====
- Allen Slagle, incumbent representative since 2023

==== Results ====
Primary results by precinct Williams: 50–60%; 60–70%; 70–80%; 80–90%; Slagle (inc.): 50–60%; 60–70%

2024 Wyoming House of Representatives District 2 Republican primary
Party	Candidate	Votes	%
Republican	J. D. Williams	1,528	54.67%
Republican	Allen Slagle (inc.)	1,259	45.05%
Write-in		8	0.29%
Valid ballots		2,795	98.38%
Invalid or blank votes		46	1.62%
Total votes		2,841	100.00%

=== Democratic primary ===
No candidate qualified for the Democratic primary. 15 write-in votes and 53 blank ballots were cast.

=== General election ===
2024 Wyoming House of Representatives District 2 general election
Party	Candidate	Votes	%
Republican	J. D. Williams	3,834	93.92%
Write-in		248	6.08%
Valid ballots		4,082	87.86%
Invalid or blank votes		564	12.14%
Total votes		4,646	100.00%

== District 3 ==
=== Republican primary ===
==== Nominee ====
- Abby Angelos, incumbent representative since 2023

==== Results ====
2024 Wyoming House of Representatives District 3 Republican primary
Party	Candidate	Votes	%
Republican	Abby Angelos (inc.)	1,455	98.54%
Write-in		23	1.56%
Valid ballots		1,478	89.96%
Invalid or blank votes		165	10.04%
Total votes		1,643	100.00%

=== Democratic primary ===
No candidate qualified for the Democratic primary. 0 write-in votes and 19 blank ballots were cast.

=== General election ===
2024 Wyoming House of Representatives District 3 general election
Party	Candidate	Votes	%
Republican	Abby Angelos (inc.)	3,753	99.05%
Write-in		36	0.95%
Valid ballots		3,789	90.06%
Invalid or blank votes		418	9.94%
Total votes		4,207	100.00%

== District 39 ==
=== Republican primary ===
Results by precinct Wylie: 40–50% 50–60%; McKee: 40–50% 50–60%; No votes

2024 Wyoming House of Representatives District 39 Republican Primary
Party	Candidate	Votes	%
Republican	Cody Wylie (inc.)	501	47.75%
Republican	Laura McKee	457	43.56%
Republican	Marshall Burt	88	8.38%
Write-in		3	0.28%
Total votes		1,049	100.00%

=== Democratic primary ===
No candidate qualified for the Democratic primary. 28 write-in votes were cast.

== See also ==
- List of Wyoming state legislatures
