= Wyoming Freedom Caucus =

Republican state legislative caucus

- Chair: Rachel Rodriguez-Williams
- Vice Chair: Chris Knapp
- Founded: September 2020; 6 years ago
- Ideology: Paleoconservatism; Trumpism; Factions: Right-libertarianism
- Political position: Right-wing to far-right
- National affiliation: State Freedom Caucus Network
- Seats in the House Republican Conference: 34 / 56
- Seats in the State House: 34 / 62

Website
- Wyoming Freedom Caucus; Wyoming Freedom PAC

The Wyoming Freedom Caucus is a caucus in the Wyoming Legislature. It is generally considered the most conservative bloc in the legislature. It was formed in September 2020 by Wyoming conservatives inspired by the national House Freedom Caucus. Since 2024, the caucus has a majority of seats in the Wyoming House of Representatives.

== History ==
The Wyoming Freedom Caucus was formed in Story, Wyoming in September 2020 by 18 to 20 Republican members of the Wyoming House of Representatives.

Starting in at least 2023, the caucus's members are sent messages from the national State Freedom Caucus Network's Wyoming state director that indicate the caucus's official stance on bills presented to the legislature, a practice known as "logrolling". It has been hypothesized by non-caucus affiliated Republican representatives, including Dan Zwonitzer that the caucus votes as a bloc in forced roll-call votes to appear more conservative than non-caucus Republicans.

During the 2023–2024 legislative session, the caucus supported bills that made it harder for voters to change party affiliation, banned the use of pills for abortion, banned gun-free zones, and defunded the diversity office of the University of Wyoming. The latter two were vetoed by Governor Mark Gordon. They opposed bills that would have made it easier for people without insurance to access care at community mental health centers, created misdemeanor and felony offenses for intimidating election officers, raise fees for nonresident fishing licenses, and 10 other bills crafted in committee.

In the 2024 primaries, the caucus was backed by Virginia-based group Make Liberty Win. In primaries, their supported candidates defeated Speaker Albert Sommers for Wyoming Senate, and the re-election bids of Speaker Pro Tem Clark Stith, Representatives David Zwonitzer, Dan Zwonitzer, Tom Walters, and Ember Oakley.

Since 2024, the caucus has a majority of seats in the Wyoming House of Representatives. Caucus members also hold every leadership position in the House. Speaker Chip Neiman and caucus chairman Rachel Rodriguez-Williams said that in the new legislative session, bills not previously given the chance to be considered will be put on the agenda. The Wyoming Republican Party, controlled by a caucus-aligned leadership, are expected to be invited to have a closer relationship with legislators after multiple years of being shut out of political activity. Following the 2024 senate elections, the caucus' allies hold two of the top three leadership positions.

The caucus has repeatedly sparred with Governor Mark Gordon over his policy, which they deem insufficiently conservative.

In February 2026, the House formed a Special Investigative Committee after Teton County activist Rebecca Bextel distributed checks to caucus-aligned lawmakers on the House floor; the episode featured in campaign mailers targeting caucus candidates during the 2026 primaries.

During the 2026 primaries, the Freedom Caucus lost a significant number of seats to more moderate Republicans, with their bloc in the House projected to shrink from 35 members to 10. Among those who lost their seats were John Bear (House Appropriations Chair) and Scott Heiner (Majority Floor Leader). The New York Times described the election results as "an empathic rebuke of the hard right" and noted that not only did many Freedom Caucus members lose re-election, but many members also lost in their attempts at unseating currently-serving moderates.

== Political positions ==
One of the caucus's major agenda items is the "Five and Dime Plan," which includes immigration measures, ending diversity programs at colleges and universities, cutting taxes, adding election-registration rules, and prohibiting environmental and social factors from being considered for state investments.

Speaker Pro Temp Jeremy Haroldson said further priorities of the caucus include putting up a physical vote scoreboard at the Legislature, banning ballot drop boxes, banning gun-free zones in Wyoming, establishing anti-SLAPP laws, addressing eminent domain laws, requiring age verification to visit pornography websites, extending a ban on transgender participation in female sports to the collegiate level, and establishing universal school choice.

Co-founder of the caucus and former representative Tim Hallinan said that further priorities include preserving the right to life and opposing abortion rights.

== List of caucus leaders ==
- Dan Laursen and Tim Hallinan (2020–2022)
- John Bear (2022–2024)
- Rachel Rodriguez-Williams (2024–present)

== Current members ==
- Jeremy Haroldson (2021–present)
- Scott Heiner (2021–present)
- Pepper Ottman (2021–present)
- John Bear (2021–present)
- Chip Neiman (2021–present)
- Tomi Strock (2023–present)
- Chris Knapp (2020–present)
- Ken Pendergraft (2021–present)
- Scott Smith (2023–present)
- Bill Allemand (2023–present)
- John Winter (2019–present)
- Joe Webb (2025–present)
- Ann Lucas (2025–present)
- Paul Hoeft (2025–present)
