= David Hill (Wyoming politician) =

American politician

Member-elect of the Wyoming House of Representatives from the 50th district
- Assuming office January 2027
- Succeeding: Rachel Rodriguez-Williams

Personal details
- Party: Republican
- Education: University of Wyoming (MBA, JD)

David Hill is an American politician and lawyer. A Republican, he is a member-elect of the Wyoming House of Representatives from the 50th district.

== Biography ==
Hill moved from Utah to Wyoming in 2015. He attended the University of Wyoming, where he received his Master's degree and Juris Doctor. After graduating, he worked as a law clerk and extern in the 5th Judicial District of Wyoming. Currently, Hill works at a local law firm in Cody, Wyoming.

Hill ran for the Wyoming House in 2024, but lost in the Republican primary to Rachel Rodriguez-Williams. He won election in 2026, defeating Libertarian challenger Carrie Satterwhite.
