= Wyoming's 41st House of Representatives district =

American legislative district

Wyoming's 41st State House of Representatives district
- Wyoming's 41st House of Representatives district as of 2022
Representative
| Gary Brown; R–Cheyenne |
- Demographics: 80% White; 2% Black; 14% Hispanic; 1% Asian; 1% Other; 2% Multiracial
- Population (2022): 9,309

Wyoming's 41st House of Representatives district is one of 62 districts in the Wyoming House of Representatives. The district encompasses part of Laramie County. It is represented by Republican Representative Gary Brown of Cheyenne.

In 1992, the state of Wyoming switched from electing state legislators by county to a district-based system.

== List of members representing the district ==
| Representative | Party | Term | Note |
|---|---|---|---|
| Mac McGraw | Democratic | 1993 – 1995 | Elected in 1992. |
| Joseph Selby | Republican | 1995 – 1997 | Elected in 1994. |
| Mac McGraw | Democratic | 1997 – 2003 | Elected in 1996. Re-elected in 1998. Re-elected in 2000. |
| Becket Hinckley | Republican | 2003 – 2007 | Elected in 2002. Re-elected in 2004. |
| Ken Esquibel | Democratic | 2007 – 2017 | Elected in 2006. Re-elected in 2008. Re-elected in 2010. Re-elected in 2012. Re-elected in 2014. |
| Bill Henderson | Republican | 2017 – 2025 | Elected in 2016. Re-elected in 2018. Re-elected in 2020. Re-elected in 2022. |
| Gary Brown | Republican | 2025 – present | Elected in 2024. |
| Erin Edwards | Republican | 2027 – member-elect | Elected in 2026. |

== Recent election results ==
=== 2014 ===
House district 41 general election
| Party | Candidate | Votes | % |
|---|---|---|---|
| Democratic | Ken Esquibel (Incumbent) | 1,479 | 59.87% |
| Republican | Donna Roofe | 987 | 39.95% |
| Write-ins | | 4 | 0.16% |
| Total votes | | 2,470 | 100.0% |
| Invalid or blank votes | | 87 | |
| Democratic hold | | | |

=== 2016 ===
House district 41 general election
| Party | Candidate | Votes | % |
|---|---|---|---|
| Republican | Bill Henderson | 1,976 | 50.66% |
| Democratic | Amy Simpson | 1,913 | 49.05% |
| Write-ins | | 11 | 0.28% |
| Total votes | | 3,900 | 100.0% |
| Invalid or blank votes | | 225 | |
| Republican gain from Democratic | | | |

=== 2018 ===
House district 41 general election
| Party | Candidate | Votes | % |
|---|---|---|---|
| Republican | Bill Henderson (Incumbent) | 1,552 | 50.66% |
| Democratic | Sean Castaneda | 1,507 | 49.20% |
| Write-ins | | 4 | 0.13% |
| Total votes | | 3,063 | 100.0% |
| Invalid or blank votes | | 96 | |
| Republican hold | | | |

=== 2020 ===
House district 41 general election
| Party | Candidate | Votes | % |
|---|---|---|---|
| Republican | Bill Henderson (Incumbent) | 2,497 | 60.32% |
| Democratic | Rebecca Fields | 1,629 | 39.35% |
| Write-ins | | 13 | 0.31% |
| Total votes | | 4,139 | 100.0% |
| Invalid or blank votes | | 113 | |
| Republican hold | | | |

=== 2022 ===
House district 41 general election
| Party | Candidate | Votes | % |
|---|---|---|---|
| Republican | Bill Henderson (Incumbent) | 1,384 | 49.32% |
| Democratic | Jen Solis | 1,163 | 41.44% |
| Constitution | Matt Freeman | 252 | 8.98% |
| Write-ins | | 7 | 0.24% |
| Total votes | | 2,806 | 100.0% |
| Invalid or blank votes | | 79 | |
| Republican hold | | | |

=== 2024 ===
House district 41 general election
| Party | Candidate | Votes | % |
|---|---|---|---|
| Republican | Gary Brown | 2,039 | 52.18% |
| Democratic | Jen Solis | 1,852 | 47.40% |
| Write-ins | | 16 | 0.40% |
| Total votes | | 3,907 | 100.0% |
| Invalid or blank votes | | 64 | |
| Republican hold | | | |

== Historical district boundaries ==
| Map | Description | Apportionment Plan | Notes |
|---|---|---|---|
| | Laramie County (part) | 1992 Apportionment Plan | |
| | Laramie County (part) | 2002 Apportionment Plan | |
| | Laramie County (part) | 2012 Apportionment Plan | |
