= Quin Blair =

American politician

Member-elect of the Wyoming House of Representatives from the 24th district
- Assuming office January 2027
- Succeeding: Nina Webber

Personal details
- Born: Cody, Wyoming, U.S.
- Party: Republican

Quin Blair is an American politician and businessman. A Republican, he is a member-elect of the Wyoming House of Representatives from the 24th district. He was formerly vice-chair of the Wyoming Office of Tourism Board of Directors, and is currently the chair of the Park County Travel Council, as well as the chief marketing officer of Blair Hotels in Cody, Wyoming.

In 2026, Blair ran for district 24 of the Wyoming House of Representatives. He defeated incumbent representative Nina Webber in the Republican primary, and won the general election unopposed.
