= Andi LeBeau =

Wyoming House of Representatives

Member of the Wyoming House of Representatives from the 33rd district
- In office January 8, 2019 – January 10, 2023
- Preceded by: Jim Allen
- Succeeded by: Sarah Penn

Personal details
- Party: Democratic
- Spouse: Donald L. Clifford (divorced)
- Children: 4
- Education: Central Wyoming College; University of Wyoming
- Profession: Consultant

Andrea "Andi" LeBeau (née Clifford) is an American Democratic politician who served in the Wyoming House of Representatives representing District 33 from 2019 to 2023. Prior to her election, Clifford served as a Fremont County Commissioner.

== Elections ==
=== 2014 ===
After incumbent Democratic Representative Patrick Goggles announced his retirement, Clifford ran for the District 33 seat. She won the Democratic primary with 68% of the vote, but narrowly lost the general election to former Republican representative Jim Allen.

=== 2018 ===
Clifford challenged incumbent Republican Representative Jim Allen and ran unopposed in the Democratic primary election. She narrowly defeated Allen in the general election with 51% of the vote.

== See also ==
- List of Native American politicians
- Native American women in politics
