= Troy Claycomb =

American politician

Member of the Wyoming House of Representatives from the 1st district
- member-elect
- Assumed office January 4, 2027
- Preceded by: Chip Neiman

Personal details
- Party: Republican
- Website: Campaign website

Troy Claycomb is an American politician. A member of the Republican Party, he is the member-elect of the Wyoming House of Representatives for the 1st district. He was elected at the 2026 election. He has had a career working in education.
