= Robert Hendry =

American politician

Member of the Wyoming House of Representatives from the 38th district
- member-elect
- Assumed office January 4, 2027
- Preceded by: Jayme Lien

Personal details
- Party: Republican
- Website: Campaign website

Robert (Rob) L. Hendry is an American politician. A member of the Republican Party, he is the member-elect of the Wyoming House of Representatives for the 38th district. He was elected at the 2026 election. He was a candidate for District 30 at the 2024 Wyoming Senate election. He was a Natrona County Commissioner.
