= George Bagby (politician) =

American politician

Member of the Wyoming House of Representatives from the 15th district
- In office 2003–2012
- Preceded by: Dave Rader
- Succeeded by: Donald Burkhart

Personal details
- Born: May 5, 1937 (age 89) Laramie, Wyoming, U.S.
- Party: Democratic
- Spouse: Joan
- Occupation: Retired brakeman/conductor

George Bagby (born May 5, 1937) is a Democratic former member of the Wyoming House of Representatives, representing the 15th district since 2003. Bagby was a Committeeman in the Wyoming National Democratic Committee from the years 2000 to 2004. He lost the 2012 elections to Don Burkhart.

Bagby used to be in the United States Army, from which he was Honorably Discharged in 1957.
