= John Wetzel (Wyoming politician) =

American politician

Member of the Wyoming House of Representatives from the 25th district
- member-elect
- Assumed office January 4, 2027
- Preceded by: Paul Hoeft

Personal details
- Party: Republican
- Website: Campaign website

John Wetzel is an American politician. A member of the Republican Party, he is the member-elect of the Wyoming House of Representatives for the 25th district. He was elected at the 2026 election. He was mayor of Powell, Wyoming.
