= Erin Edwards =

American politician

Member of the Wyoming House of Representatives from the 41st district
- member-elect
- Assumed office January 4, 2027
- Preceded by: Gary Brown

Personal details
- Party: Republican
- Website: Campaign website

Erin Edwards is an American politician. A member of the Republican Party, she is the member-elect of the Wyoming House of Representatives for the 41st district. She was elected at the 2026 election. She is a volunteer firefighter from Laramie County, Wyoming.
