= Ken Esquibel =

American politician

Member of the Wyoming House of Representatives from the 41st district
- In office January 9, 2007 – January 10, 2017
- Preceded by: Becket Hinckley
- Succeeded by: Bill Henderson

Personal details
- Born: June 30, 1959 (age 67) Cheyenne, Wyoming, U.S.
- Party: Democratic
- Spouse: Suzy
- Occupation: Railroad engineer

Ken A. Esquibel (born June 30, 1959) is a former Democratic member of the Wyoming House of Representatives, representing the 41st district from 2007 to 2017.

Esquibel is the brother of Floyd Esquibel, also a former state legislator in Wyoming. He is Hispanic.
