= Forrest Chadwick =

American politician

Member of the Wyoming House of Representatives from the 62nd district
- In office January 2, 2023 – 2025
- Preceded by: Constituency established
- Succeeded by: Kevin Campbell

Personal details
- Party: Republican

Forrest Chadwick is an American politician. He served as a Republican member for the 62nd district of the Wyoming House of Representatives.
