= Sarah Penn =

American politician

Member of the Wyoming House of Representatives from the 33rd district
- In office January 2, 2023 – January 6, 2025
- Preceded by: Andi LeBeau
- Succeeded by: Ivan Posey

Personal details
- Born: Cache County, Utah, U.S.
- Party: Republican
- Children: 3
- Education: Utah State University (ASN); Weber State University (BSN); University of Colorado Denver (MSN)

Sarah Penn is an American politician and nurse practitioner who served as a member of the Wyoming House of Representatives for the 33rd district. Elected in November 2022, she assumed office on January 2, 2023.

== Early life and education ==
A native of Cache County, Utah, Penn graduated from Mountain Crest High School. She earned an Associate of Science in nursing from Utah State University, a Bachelor of Science in nursing from Weber State University, and a Master of Science in nursing from the Anschutz Medical Campus at the University of Colorado Denver.

== Career ==
Penn worked as a family nurse practitioner in Denver before moving to Green River, Wyoming, and later Lander, Wyoming. She was elected to the Wyoming House of Representatives in November 2022.

In the 2024 Wyoming House of Representatives election, she was unseated by Democratic candidate Ivan Posey.

== Personal life ==
Penn and her husband, Nate, have three children.
