= Carl Manning (politician) =

American politician

Member-elect of the Wyoming House of Representatives from the 55th district
- Assuming office January 2027
- Succeeding: Joel Guggenmos

Personal details
- Party: Republican

Carl Manning is an American politician. A member of the Republican Party, he is the member-elect for the 55th district of the Wyoming House of Representatives.
