= Donald Burkhart =

American politician

Speaker pro tempore of the Wyoming House of Representatives
- In office January 10, 2017 – January 8, 2019
- Preceded by: Tim Stubson
- Succeeded by: Albert Sommers

Member of the Wyoming House of Representatives from the 15th district
- In office January 11, 2011 – January 6, 2025
- Preceded by: George Bagby
- Succeeded by: Pam Thayer

Personal details
- Born: September 4, 1948 (age 77)
- Party: Republican
- Education: John Carroll University (BS)
- Website: Campaign website

Donald E. Burkhart Jr. (born September 4, 1948) is an American politician who was a Republican member of the Wyoming House of Representatives representing District 15 from January 11, 2011 to January 6, 2025.

== Education ==
Burkhart earned his BS in physics from John Carroll University.

== Elections ==
- 2012 Burkhart and former Representative George Bagby were both unopposed for their August 21, 2012 primaries, setting up a rematch; Burkhart won the November 6, 2012 general election with 1,717 votes (51.1%) against Representative Bagby.
- 2010 To challenge incumbent Democratic Representative George Bagby for the District 15 seat, Burkhart won the August 17, 2010 Republican Primary with 497 votes (47.7%), and won the November 2, 2010 general election by 11 votes with 1,153 votes (49.4%) against Representative Bagby, who had held the seat since 2003.

Wyoming House of Representatives
| Preceded by Tim Stubson | Speaker pro tempore of the Wyoming House of Representatives; 2017–2019 | Succeeded by Albert Sommers |
