= Ben Hornok =

Wyoming politician

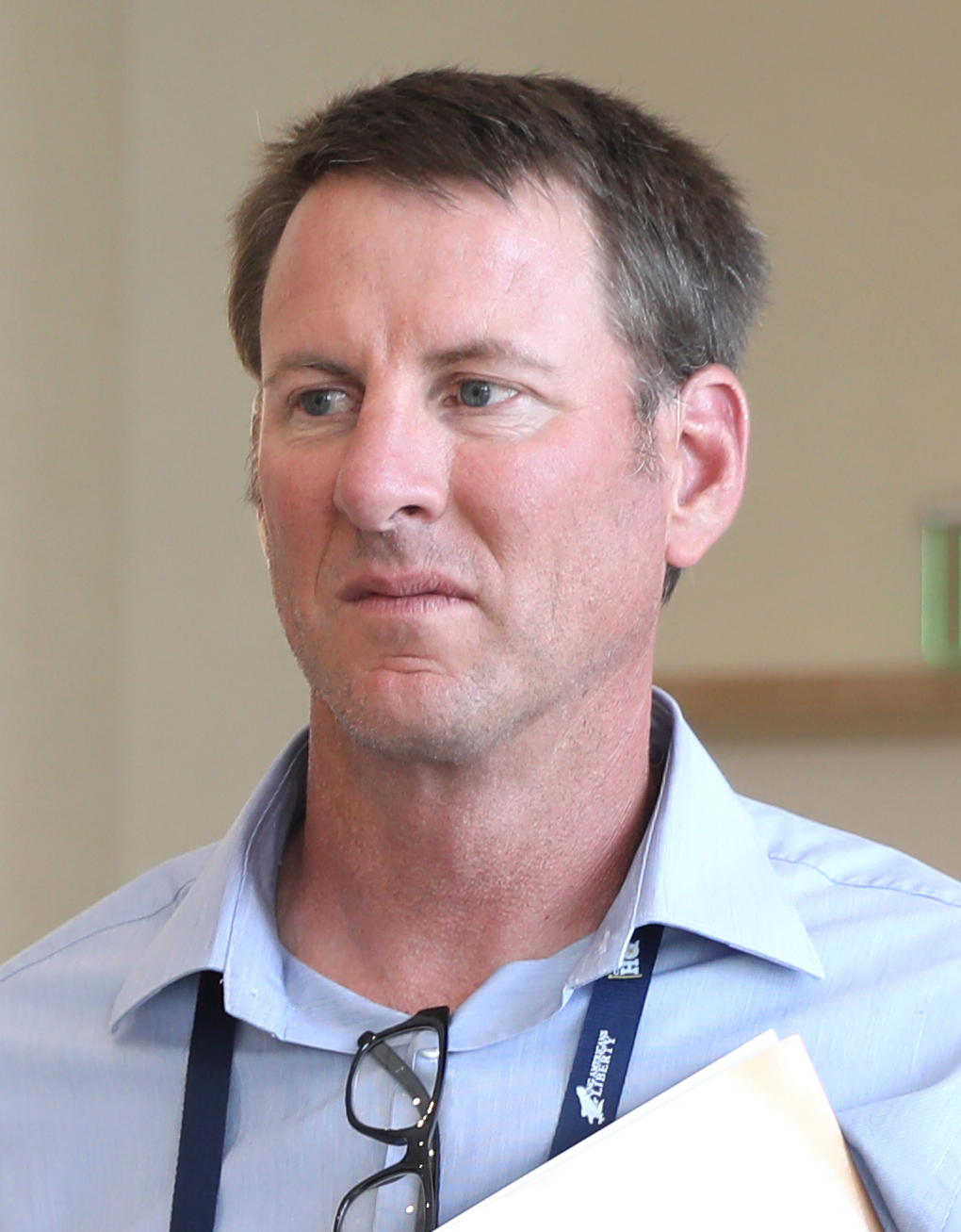

Member of the Wyoming House of Representatives from the 42nd district
- In office January 2, 2023 – January 2025
- Preceded by: Jim Blackburn
- Succeeded by: Rob Geringer

Personal details
- Party: Republican
- Spouse: Married
- Education: Salt Lake Community College, Frontier School of the Bible (BA)
- Occupation: General Contractor

Ben Hornok is an American Republican politician, a Wyoming Freedom Caucus member<https://bwar.vote/freedom-caucus/>, and general contractor who served as a member of the Wyoming House of Representatives from the 42nd district. Elected on November 8, 2022, in the 2022 Wyoming House of Representatives election, he assumed office on January 2, 2023. He was defeated in his attempt at re-election in the 2024 Republican primary.

== Biography ==
Hornok is a Christian, and works as a general contractor outside of politics. He obtained a B.A in Biblical Studies at Frontier School of the Bible in 1997, and studied Construction Management at Salt Lake Community College in 2003. He has five siblings. His father and grandfather were pastors.
