= Wyoming's 62nd House of Representatives district =

American legislative district

Wyoming's 62nd State House of Representatives district
- Wyoming's 62nd House of Representatives district as of 2022
Representative
Kevin Campbell; R–Glenrock
- Demographics: 85% White; 1% Black; 9% Hispanic; 5% Multiracial
- Population (2022): 8,355

Wyoming's 62nd House of Representatives district is one of 62 districts in the Wyoming House of Representatives. The district encompasses parts of Converse and Natrona counties. It is represented by Republican Representative Kevin Campbell of Glenrock.

During the 2020 redistricting cycle, the Wyoming Legislature passed a bill in 2022 solidifying the new legislative district boundaries in the state. These changed districts included adding two new seats, the 61st district and the 62nd district, to the state house, which previously had only 60 seats.

== List of members representing the district ==
Representative	Party	Term	Note
Forrest Chadwick	Republican	2023 – 2025	Elected in 2022.
Kevin Campbell	Republican	2025 – present	Elected in 2024.

== Election results ==
=== 2022 ===
House district 62 general election
Party	Candidate	Votes	%
Republican	Forrest Chadwick	2,518	97.63%
Write-ins		61	2.36%
Total votes		2,579	100.0%
Invalid or blank votes		373	

=== 2024 ===
House district 62 general election
Party	Candidate	Votes	%
Republican	Kevin Campbell	3,496	98.14%
Write-ins		66	1.85%
Total votes		3,562	100.0%
Invalid or blank votes		706	
Republican hold			
