= Wyoming's 42nd House of Representatives district =

American legislative district

Wyoming's 42nd State House of Representatives district
- Wyoming's 42nd House of Representatives district as of 2022
Representative
Rob Geringer; R–Cheyenne
- Demographics: 80% White; 1% Black; 11% Hispanic; 2% Asian; 2% Other; 4% Multiracial
- Population (2022): 9,227

Wyoming's 42nd House of Representatives district is one of 62 districts in the Wyoming House of Representatives. The district encompasses part of Laramie County. It is represented by Republican Representative Rob Geringer of Cheyenne.

In 1992, the state of Wyoming switched from electing state legislators by county to a district-based system.

== List of members representing the district ==
Representative	Party	Term	Note
John G. Hanes	Republican	1993 – 1999	Elected in 1992. Re-elected in 1994. Re-elected in 1996.
Pete Illoway	Republican	1999 – 2013	Elected in 1998. Re-elected in 2000. Re-elected in 2002. Re-elected in 2004. Re-elected in 2006. Re-elected in 2008. Re-elected in 2010.
Lynn Hutchings	Republican	2013 – 2015	Elected in 2012.
Jim Blackburn	Republican	2015 – 2023	Elected in 2014. Re-elected in 2016. Re-elected in 2018. Re-elected in 2020.
Ben Hornok	Republican	2023 – 2025	Elected in 2022.
Rob Geringer	Republican	2025 – present	Elected in 2024.

== Recent election results ==
=== 2014 ===
House district 42 general election
Party	Candidate	Votes	%
Republican	Jim Blackburn	1,800	66.15%
Democratic	Gary L. Datus	909	33.40%
Write-ins		12	0.44%
Total votes		2,721	100.0%
Invalid or blank votes		190	
Republican hold			

=== 2016 ===
House district 42 general election
Party	Candidate	Votes	%
Republican	Jim Blackburn (Incumbent)	2,775	68.09%
Democratic	Juliet M. Daniels	1,290	31.65%
Write-ins		10	0.24%
Total votes		4,075	100.0%
Invalid or blank votes		239	
Republican hold			

=== 2018 ===
House district 42 general election
Party	Candidate	Votes	%
Republican	Jim Blackburn (Incumbent)	2,187	65.83%
Democratic	Juliet Daniels	1,130	34.01%
Write-ins		5	0.15%
Total votes		3,322	100.0%
Invalid or blank votes		161	
Republican hold			

=== 2020 ===
House district 42 general election
Party	Candidate	Votes	%
Republican	Jim Blackburn (Incumbent)	3,918	94.77%
Write-ins		216	5.22%
Total votes		4,134	100.0%
Invalid or blank votes		672	
Republican hold			

=== 2022 ===
House district 42 general election
Party	Candidate	Votes	%
Republican	Ben Hornok	2,414	94.96%
Write-ins		128	5.03%
Total votes		2,542	100.0%
Invalid or blank votes		466	
Republican hold			

=== 2024 ===
House district 42 general election
Party	Candidate	Votes	%
Republican	Rob Geringer	3,270	77.69%
Democratic	Bob Ray	853	20.26%
Write-ins		86	2.04%
Total votes		4,209	100.0%
Invalid or blank votes		79	
Republican hold			

== Historical district boundaries ==
Map	Description	Apportionment Plan	Notes
	Laramie County (part)	1992 Apportionment Plan	
	Laramie County (part)	2002 Apportionment Plan	
	Laramie County (part)	2012 Apportionment Plan	
