= Wyoming's 25th House of Representatives district =

American legislative district

Wyoming's 25th State House of Representatives district
- Wyoming's 25th House of Representatives district as of 2022
Representative
| Paul Hoeft; R–Powell |
- Demographics: 83% White; 10% Hispanic; 1% Asian; 2% Other; 4% Multiracial
- Population (2022): 9,515

Wyoming's 25th House of Representatives district is one of 62 districts in the Wyoming House of Representatives. The district encompasses part of Park County. It is represented by Republican Representative Paul Hoeft of Powell.

In 1992, the state of Wyoming switched from electing state legislators by county to a district-based system.

== List of members representing the district ==
| Representative | Party | Term | Note |
|---|---|---|---|
| John DeWitt | Republican | 1993 – 1996 | Elected in 1992. Re-elected in 1994. Died in 1996. |
| Denny Smith | Republican | 1996 – 1999 | Appointed in 1996. Re-elected in 1996. Re-elected in 1998. Died in 1999. |
| Alan C. Jones | Republican | 1999 – 2009 | Appointed in 1999. Re-elected in 2000. Re-elected in 2002. Re-elected in 2004. Re-elected in 2006. |
| David Bonner | Republican | 2009 – 2013 | Elected in 2008. Re-elected in 2010. |
| David Blevins | Republican | 2013 – 2015 | Elected in 2012. |
| Dan Laursen | Republican | 2015 – 2023 | Elected in 2014. Re-elected in 2016. Re-elected in 2018. Re-elected in 2020. |
| David Northrup | Republican | 2023 – 2025 | Elected in 2022. |
| Paul Hoeft | Republican | 2025 – present | Elected in 2024. |
| John Wetzel | Republican | 2027 – member-elect | Elected in 2026. |

== Recent election results ==
=== 2014 ===
House district 25 general election
| Party | Candidate | Votes | % |
|---|---|---|---|
| Republican | Dan Laursen | 2,114 | 96.75% |
| Write-ins | | 71 | 3.24% |
| Total votes | | 2,185 | 100.0% |
| Invalid or blank votes | | 417 | |
| Republican hold | | | |

=== 2016 ===
House district 25 general election
| Party | Candidate | Votes | % |
|---|---|---|---|
| Republican | Dan Laursen (Incumbent) | 3,135 | 78.55% |
| Democratic | Shane Tillotson | 837 | 20.97% |
| Write-ins | | 19 | 0.47% |
| Total votes | | 3,991 | 100.0% |
| Invalid or blank votes | | 180 | |
| Republican hold | | | |

=== 2018 ===
House district 25 general election
| Party | Candidate | Votes | % |
|---|---|---|---|
| Republican | Dan Laursen (Incumbent) | 2,586 | 96.02% |
| Write-ins | | 107 | 3.97% |
| Total votes | | 2,693 | 100.0% |
| Invalid or blank votes | | 474 | |
| Republican hold | | | |

=== 2020 ===
House district 25 general election
| Party | Candidate | Votes | % |
|---|---|---|---|
| Republican | Dan Laursen (Incumbent) | 3,722 | 90.55% |
| Write-ins | | 388 | 9.44% |
| Total votes | | 4,110 | 100.0% |
| Invalid or blank votes | | 554 | |
| Republican hold | | | |

=== 2022 ===
House district 25 general election
| Party | Candidate | Votes | % |
|---|---|---|---|
| Republican | David Northrup | 2,585 | 88.37% |
| Write-ins | | 340 | 11.62% |
| Total votes | | 2,925 | 100.0% |
| Invalid or blank votes | | 437 | |
| Republican hold | | | |

=== 2024 ===
House district 25 general election
| Party | Candidate | Votes | % |
|---|---|---|---|
| Republican | Paul Hoeft | 3,673 | 93.86% |
| Write-ins | | 240 | 6.13% |
| Total votes | | 3,913 | 100.0% |
| Invalid or blank votes | | 589 | |
| Republican hold | | | |

== Historical district boundaries ==
| Map | Description | Apportionment Plan | Notes |
|---|---|---|---|
| | Big Horn County (part); Park County (part) | 1992 Apportionment Plan | |
| | Park County (part) | 2002 Apportionment Plan | |
| | Park County (part) | 2012 Apportionment Plan | |
