= Karlee Provenza =

American politician

- Provenza in 2026

Member of the Wyoming House of Representatives from the 45th district
- Incumbent
- Assumed office January 4, 2021
- Preceded by: Charles Pelkey

Personal details
- Born: Pueblo, Colorado, U.S.
- Party: Democratic
- Education: University of Northern Colorado (BA); University of Wyoming (MA, PhD)
- Committees: 2025-House Agriculture, State and Public Lands & Water Resources 2025-House Rules & Procedure 2025-House Travel, Recreation, Wildlife & Cultural Resources 2025-Select Committee on School Facilities 2025-Select Natural Resource Funding Committee

Karlee R. Provenza is an American politician serving as a member of the Wyoming House of Representatives from the 45th district. Elected in November 2020, she assumed office on January 4, 2021.

== Early life and education ==
Provenza was born in Pueblo, Colorado. She earned a Bachelor of Arts degree in psychology from the University of Northern Colorado and a Master of Arts in experimental psychology from the University of Wyoming. She earned a PhD in experimental psychology and law from the University of Wyoming.

== Career ==
Provenza has worked as an instructor at the University of Wyoming since 2017. She has previously worked as a waitress, photographer, and private investigator.

=== Albany County for Proper Policing ===
In 2018, Robbie Ramirez was murdered when Derek Colling, Albany County sheriff's deputy, shot him following a traffic stop. In the wake of Ramirez's death, Karlee Provenza with other members of the Laramie community founded the organization Albany County for Proper Policing (ACOPP).

=== Trans Day of Visibility 2023 ===
In response to Trans Day of Visibility, Provenza shared a social media post on her private social media account that said, "Auntie Fa Says Protect Trans Folks Against Fascists & Bigots!" The photo imposed with the words contains an older woman holding a scoped black rifle with an external magazine. A screenshot of Provenza's post was shared by the Wyoming Freedom Caucus on Twitter with the caption, "Not even one week after a radical transgender activist slaughtered 6 Christians, including 3 children, a Wyoming Legislator for HD45 shares a disgusting call for further violence. The Wyoming Legislature's House Minority Whip should be ashamed of herself." Provenza has stated that the accusations ascribed to her posts that she supports terrorism and intended to incite violence are false. She has since issued a statement of apology.

In response to Provenza's support of the Second Amendment in protection of trans people, the Wyoming Republican Party Chairman Frank Eathorne filed a formal complaint against Provenza, asking that the Speaker of the House, Albert Sommers, remove Provenza from her committee assignments. Speaker Sommers made a formal statement in his decision to dismiss the complaints filed against Provenza and she remains on the committees she was originally assigned to.

== Legislation ==
=== 2021 ===
Sponsored

- HB0199 Vehicle insurance-anti stacking prohibition.
- HB0206 Wyoming minimum wage.
- HB0212 Expungement for restoration of rights.
- HB0213 Disclosure of peace officer recordings.
- HB0247 Law enforcement hiring practices.

Co-Sponsored

- HB0103 Journalists-privileged communications.
- HB0160 Election ballot order.
- HB0162 Medical treatment opportunity act.
- HB0167 Youthful offender program access.
- HB0186 Automated traffic law enforcement-prohibition.
- HB0208 Defend the guard act.
- HB0209 Regulation of marijuana.
- HB0215 Cosmetology and barbering practice amendments.
- HB0246 Eliminate fines and fees for juvenile offenders.
- HB1021 COVID-19 community response.
- SF0131 Workplace transparency act-2.

=== 2022 ===
Co-Sponsored

- HB0081 Operation of motorcycles-disabled persons.
- HB0106 Decriminalization of cannabis.
- HB0143 Wyoming medical cannabis.

=== 2023 ===
Sponsored

- HB0147 Unlawful trespass signage-taking of wildlife.
- HB0173 Records available to POST.
- HB0186 Court appointed attorneys-fee prohibition for minors.
- HB0193 Carbon capture energy standards-repeal.
- HB0240 Ballot initiative process amendments.
- HB0245 Court ordered placement-child support.
- HB0273 Game and fish trespass-intent.

Co-Sponsored

- HB0077 School finance-average daily membership.
- HB0091 News source shield law.
- HB0117 Abortion amendments.
- HB0118 Volunteer firefighter pension-funding.
- HB0120 Traffic stops-probable cause.
- HB0169 K-12 post secondary education options.
- HB0176 K-12 education standards and assessments.
- HB0192 Education-K-12 food service program.
- HB0197 Defend the guard act.
- HB0230 Driver license penalties-time limit for imposition.
- HB0241 Prohibiting sexual relations with persons in police custody.
- HB0263 Restoration of voting rights-amendments.
- SF0069 Electronic records retention.
- SF0087 Natural resource funding-large project threshold increase.
- SF0089 Insurance coverage for hearing aids.
- SF0120 Restoration of civil rights.
- SF0175 Hazing.
- SF0180 Corner crossing-trespass exception.

=== 2024 ===
Sponsored

- HB0142 Peace officer standards and training commission-funding.
- HB0180 Freedom from government seizure act.
- HB0204 Decriminalization of cannabis.

Co-Sponsored

- HB0076 Reproductive Freedom Act.
- HB0113 Hathaway scholarship program.
- HB0114 Wyoming teacher shortage loan repayment program.
- HB0195 Defend the guard act.
- HB0209 Possession of alcohol-amendments.
- SF0057 Wyoming adult hearing aid program.
- SF0073 Concealed firearms-permit eligibility.

=== 2025 ===
Sponsored

- HB0099 Access to public lands-corner crossing.
- HB0191 Civil penalties for cannabis.
- HB0195 Credit reporting-medical debt.
- HB0284 Required hospital services.

Co-Sponsored

- HB0122 Senior citizen service districts-authorization and renewal.
- HB0150 Meat processors-composted materials.
- HB0178 Work allowance for voting.
- HB0216 Prohibition on gas chamber euthanasia of animals.
- HB0239 Reproductive Freedom Act.
- HB0253 Construction lien revisions.
- HB0267 Regulation of hemp.
- SF0075 Coroner investigations-disposition of decedent's property.
- SF0113 Braider opportunity act.
- SF0126 Establishment of a K-8 public lab school.
