= Wyoming's 33rd House of Representatives district =

American legislative district

Wyoming's 33rd State House of Representatives district
- Wyoming's 33rd House of Representatives district as of 2022
Representative
| Ivan Posey; D–Fort Washakie |
- Demographics: 37% White; 1% Black; 5% Hispanic; 54% Native American; 3% Multiracial
- Population (2022): 9,757

Wyoming's 33rd House of Representatives district is one of 62 districts in the Wyoming House of Representatives. The district encompasses part of Fremont County. It is represented by Democratic Representative Ivan Posey of Fort Washakie.

In 1992, the state of Wyoming switched from electing state legislators by county to a district-based system.

== List of members representing the district ==
| Representative | Party | Term | Note |
|---|---|---|---|
| Harry B. Tipton | Republican | 1993 – 2004 | Elected in 1992. Re-elected in 1994. Re-elected in 1996. Re-elected in 1998. Re-elected in 2000. Re-elected in 2002. Died in 2004. |
| Jim Allen | Republican | 2004 – 2005 | Appointed in 2004. |
| Patrick Goggles | Democratic | 2005 – 2015 | Elected in 2004. Re-elected in 2006. Re-elected in 2008. Re-elected in 2010. Re-elected in 2012. |
| Jim Allen | Republican | 2015 – 2019 | Elected in 2014. Re-elected in 2016. |
| Andi LeBeau | Democratic | 2019 – 2023 | Elected in 2018. Re-elected in 2020. |
| Sarah Penn | Republican | 2023 – 2025 | Elected in 2022. |
| Ivan Posey | Democratic | 2025 – present | Elected in 2024. |

== Recent election results ==
=== 2014 ===
House district 33 general election
| Party | Candidate | Votes | % |
|---|---|---|---|
| Republican | Jim Allen | 1,149 | 52.85% |
| Democratic | Andi LeBeau | 1,019 | 46.87% |
| Write-ins | | 6 | 0.27% |
| Total votes | | 2,174 | 100.0% |
| Invalid or blank votes | | 83 | |
| Republican gain from Democratic | | | |

=== 2016 ===
House district 33 general election
| Party | Candidate | Votes | % |
|---|---|---|---|
| Republican | Jim Allen (Incumbent) | 1,534 | 50.99% |
| Democratic | Sergio A. Maldonado Sr. | 1,467 | 48.76% |
| Write-ins | | 7 | 0.23% |
| Total votes | | 3,008 | 100.0% |
| Invalid or blank votes | | 77 | |
| Republican hold | | | |

=== 2018 ===
House district 33 general election
| Party | Candidate | Votes | % |
|---|---|---|---|
| Democratic | Andi LeBeau | 1,317 | 51.06% |
| Republican | Jim Allen (Incumbent) | 1,259 | 48.81% |
| Write-ins | | 3 | 0.11% |
| Total votes | | 2,579 | 100.0% |
| Invalid or blank votes | | 101 | |
| Democratic gain from Republican | | | |

=== 2020 ===
House district 33 general election
| Party | Candidate | Votes | % |
|---|---|---|---|
| Democratic | Andi LeBeau (Incumbent) | 1,434 | 45.40% |
| Republican | Valaira Whiteman | 1,338 | 42.36% |
| Independent | Clinton D. Wagon | 375 | 11.87% |
| Write-ins | | 11 | 0.34% |
| Total votes | | 3,158 | 100.0% |
| Invalid or blank votes | | 157 | |
| Democratic hold | | | |

=== 2022 ===
House district 33 general election
| Party | Candidate | Votes | % |
|---|---|---|---|
| Republican | Sarah Penn | 1,077 | 55.20% |
| Democratic | Andi LeBeau (Incumbent) | 867 | 44.43% |
| Write-ins | | 7 | 0.35 |
| Total votes | | 1,951 | 100.0% |
| Invalid or blank votes | | 67 | |
| Republican gain from Democratic | | | |

=== 2024 ===
House district 33 general election
| Party | Candidate | Votes | % |
|---|---|---|---|
| Democratic | Ivan Posey | 1,675 | 57.79% |
| Republican | Sarah Penn (Incumbent) | 1,210 | 41.75% |
| Write-ins | | 13 | 0.44% |
| Total votes | | 2,898 | 100.0% |
| Invalid or blank votes | | 93 | |
| Democratic gain from Republican | | | |

== Historical district boundaries ==
| Map | Description | Apportionment Plan | Notes |
|---|---|---|---|
| | Fremont County (part) | 1992 Apportionment Plan | |
| | Fremont County (part) | 2002 Apportionment Plan | |
| | Fremont County (part) | 2012 Apportionment Plan | |
