= Mike Schmid (politician) =

American politician

Member of the Wyoming House of Representatives from the 20th district
- Incumbent
- Assumed office January 6, 2025
- Preceded by: Albert Sommers

Personal details
- Party: Republican
- Website: www.wyhd20.com

Michael (Mike) Schmid is an American politician. He serves as a Republican member for the 20th district in the Wyoming House of Representatives since 2025.

He previously worked in the oil industry in La Barge and is aligned with the Freedom Caucus. He also worked for the Wyoming Game and Fish Department.
