= Ivan Posey =

American politician

Member of the Wyoming House of Representatives from the 33rd district
- Incumbent
- Assumed office January 6, 2025
- Preceded by: Sarah Penn

Personal details
- Party: Democratic Party

Ivan Posey is an American politician who is a member of the Wyoming House of Representatives from the 33rd district. He defeated incumbent Republican Sarah Penn in the 2024 state house election. A Democrat hailing from the Wind River Reservation, Posey is the only Native American or Indigenous member of the 68th Wyoming Legislature.

Posey was born and raised on the Wind River Indian Reservation in Wyoming, and served as Tribal Education Coordinator at Central Wyoming College when he was elected to the state legislature.

== Electoral history ==
2024 Wyoming House of Representatives District 33 Democratic primary
Party	Candidate	Votes	%
Democratic	Ivan Posey	239	99.17%
Write-in		2	0.83%
Valid ballots		241	97.97%
Invalid or blank votes		5	2.03%
Total votes		246	100.00%

2024 Wyoming House of Representatives District 33 general election
Party	Candidate	Votes	%
Democratic	Ivan Posey	1,675	57.80%
Republican	Sarah Penn (inc.)	1,210	41.75%
Write-in		13	0.45%
Valid ballots		2,898	96.89%
Invalid or blank votes		93	3.11%
Total votes		2,991	100.00%
