= Wyoming's 15th House of Representatives district =

American legislative district

Wyoming's 15th State House of Representatives district
- Wyoming's 15th House of Representatives district as of 2022
Representative
Pam Thayer; R–Rawlins
- Demographics: 71% White; 2% Black; 23% Hispanic; 1% Asian; 1% Native American; 2% Multiracial
- Population (2022): 9,020

Wyoming's 15th House of Representatives district is one of 62 districts in the Wyoming House of Representatives. The district encompasses parts of Carbon and Sweetwater counties. It is represented by Republican Representative Pam Thayer of Rawlins.

In 1992, the state of Wyoming switched from electing state legislators by county to a district-based system.

== List of members representing the district ==
Representative	Party	Term	Note
Bill Vasey	Democratic	1993 – 1995	Elected in 1992.
Tony Rose	Republican	1995 – 2002	Elected in 1994. Re-elected in 1996. Re-elected in 1998. Re-elected in 2000. Resigned in 2002.
Dave Rader	Republican	2002 – 2003	Appointed in 2002.
George Bagby	Democratic	2003 – 2011	Elected in 2002. Re-elected in 2004. Re-elected in 2006. Re-elected in 2008.
Donald Burkhart	Republican	2011 – 2025	Elected in 2010. Re-elected in 2012. Re-elected in 2014. Re-elected in 2016. Re-elected in 2018. Re-elected in 2020. Re-elected in 2022.
Pam Thayer	Republican	2025 – present	Elected in 2024.

== Recent election results ==
=== 2014 ===
House district 15 general election
Party	Candidate	Votes	%
Republican	Donald Burkhart (Incumbent)	1,700	97.92%
Write-ins		36	2.07%
Total votes		1,736	100.0%
Invalid or blank votes		475	
Republican hold			

=== 2016 ===
House district 15 general election
Party	Candidate	Votes	%
Republican	Donald Burkhart (Incumbent)	2,086	66.70%
Democratic	DeBari T. Martinez	1,030	32.93%
Write-ins		11	0.35%
Total votes		3,127	100.0%
Invalid or blank votes		95	
Republican hold			

=== 2018 ===
House district 15 general election
Party	Candidate	Votes	%
Republican	Donald Burkhart (Incumbent)	1,997	97.55%
Write-ins		50	2.44%
Total votes		2,047	100.0%
Invalid or blank votes		488	
Republican hold			

=== 2020 ===
House district 15 general election
Party	Candidate	Votes	%
Republican	Donald Burkhart (Incumbent)	2,052	63.98%
Democratic	Jacquelin Wells	1,144	35.67%
Write-ins		11	0.34%
Total votes		3,207	100.0%
Invalid or blank votes		72	
Republican hold			

=== 2022 ===
House district 15 general election
Party	Candidate	Votes	%
Republican	Donald Burkhart (Incumbent)	1,552	71.29%
Libertarian	Patrick Gonzales	602	27.65%
Write-ins		23	1.05%
Total votes		2,177	100.0%
Invalid or blank votes		116	
Republican hold			

=== 2024 ===
House district 15 general election
Party	Candidate	Votes	%
Republican	Pam Thayer	2,790	96.64%
Write-ins		97	3.35%
Total votes		2,887	100.0%
Invalid or blank votes		428	
Republican hold			

== Historical district boundaries ==
Map	Description	Apportionment Plan	Notes
	Carbon County (part)	1992 Apportionment Plan	
	Carbon County (part)	2002 Apportionment Plan	
	Carbon County (part)	2012 Apportionment Plan	
