= Albert Sommers =

American politician

66th Speaker of the Wyoming House of Representatives
- In office January 10, 2023 – January 14, 2025
- Preceded by: Eric Barlow
- Succeeded by: Chip Neiman

Majority Leader of the Wyoming House of Representatives
- In office January 12, 2021 – January 10, 2023
- Preceded by: Eric Barlow
- Succeeded by: Chip Neiman

Speaker pro tempore of the Wyoming House of Representatives
- In office January 8, 2019 – January 12, 2021
- Preceded by: Donald Burkhart
- Succeeded by: Mike Greear

Member of the Wyoming House of Representatives from the 20th district
- In office January 8, 2013 – January 6, 2025
- Preceded by: Kathy Davison
- Succeeded by: Mike Schmid

Personal details
- Born: May 27, 1959 (age 67) Jackson, Wyoming, U.S.
- Party: Republican
- Education: University of Wyoming (BS)
- Website: Campaign website

Albert P. Sommers III (born May 27, 1959) is an American rancher and Republican politician from Wyoming. He served in the Wyoming House of Representatives for the 20th district from 2013 to 2025, and was the 66th speaker of the House from 2023 to 2025. Identified with the more traditional wing of the state Republican Party, he also held the posts of speaker pro tempore and majority floor leader during his tenure. Sommers left the House after an unsuccessful 2024 campaign for the Wyoming Senate, and in 2026 announced a bid to return to his former House seat. On August 18th, he won the primary with 62% of the vote.

== Early life and education ==
Sommers was born on May 27, 1959, in Jackson, Wyoming. He graduated from the University of Wyoming in 1981 with a Bachelor of Science in electrical engineering, then returned to Sublette County to work on his family's cattle ranch. A lifelong cattle rancher, he owns the Sommers Ranch near Pinedale.

== Elections ==
2012 With Republican Representative Kathy Davison redistricted to District 18, Sommers won the District 20 August 21, 2012 Republican Primary with 1,247 votes (65.8%), and was unopposed for the November 6, 2012 General election, winning with 3,467 votes.

He was re-elected through 2022, representing a district that covers Sublette County and part of eastern Lincoln County.

=== Tenure and leadership ===
Over six terms, Sommers rose through House leadership, serving as majority whip, then as speaker pro tempore from 2019 to 2021 and majority floor leader from 2021 to 2023. In November 2022, House Republicans chose him as speaker for the 67th Legislature over Sheridan representative Mark Jennings, who was aligned with the Freedom Caucus.

His legislative work centered on health care, education, and water policy. He chaired a broadband task force and the Select Committee on School Finance Recalibration, helped direct funding to rural hospitals, and backed the creation of the Wyoming Colorado River Advisory Committee within the State Engineer's Office.

Sommers was associated with the Wyoming Caucus, a bloc of more traditional Republicans, and he became a frequent target of the Wyoming Freedom Caucus and the national State Freedom Caucus Network, which argued he was insufficiently conservative. During the 2023 session, he used the speaker's authority to keep several bills from advancing, including a measure that critics characterized as a "Don't Say Gay" bill. Sommers said the proposal addressed conduct that was not occurring in Wyoming schools and that he believed it was unconstitutional.

=== 2024 Senate campaign ===
After his term as speaker, Sommers did not seek re-election to the House and instead ran for Senate District 14 in 2024, following incumbent Fred Baldwin's decision not to run again. He lost the August 20 Republican primary to Laura Taliaferro Pearson, a Kemmerer-area sheep rancher endorsed by the Freedom Caucus, by about 3.4 percent. Sommers carried Sublette County but trailed in Uinta, Sweetwater, and Lincoln counties. Pearson went on to win the general election, part of a wider shift that gave the Freedom Caucus control of the House.

=== 2026 candidacy ===
In April 2026, after incumbent Mike Schmid said he would not seek re-election, Sommers announced that he would run to reclaim House District 20. He cited concerns about the direction of the Freedom Caucus-controlled House, including budget decisions made during the 2026 session. He easily captured the nomination on August 18th, winning 62.3% of the vote against Matt McGinnis and Bill Winney.

Wyoming House of Representatives
Preceded by Donald Burkhart	Speaker pro tempore of the Wyoming House of Representatives; 2019–2021	Succeeded by Mike Greear
Preceded by Eric Barlow	Majority Leader of the Wyoming House of Representatives; 2021–2023	Succeeded by Chip Neiman
Political offices
Preceded by Eric Barlow	Speaker of the Wyoming House of Representatives; 2023–2025	Succeeded by Chip Neiman
