= Bill Henderson (Wyoming politician) =

American politician

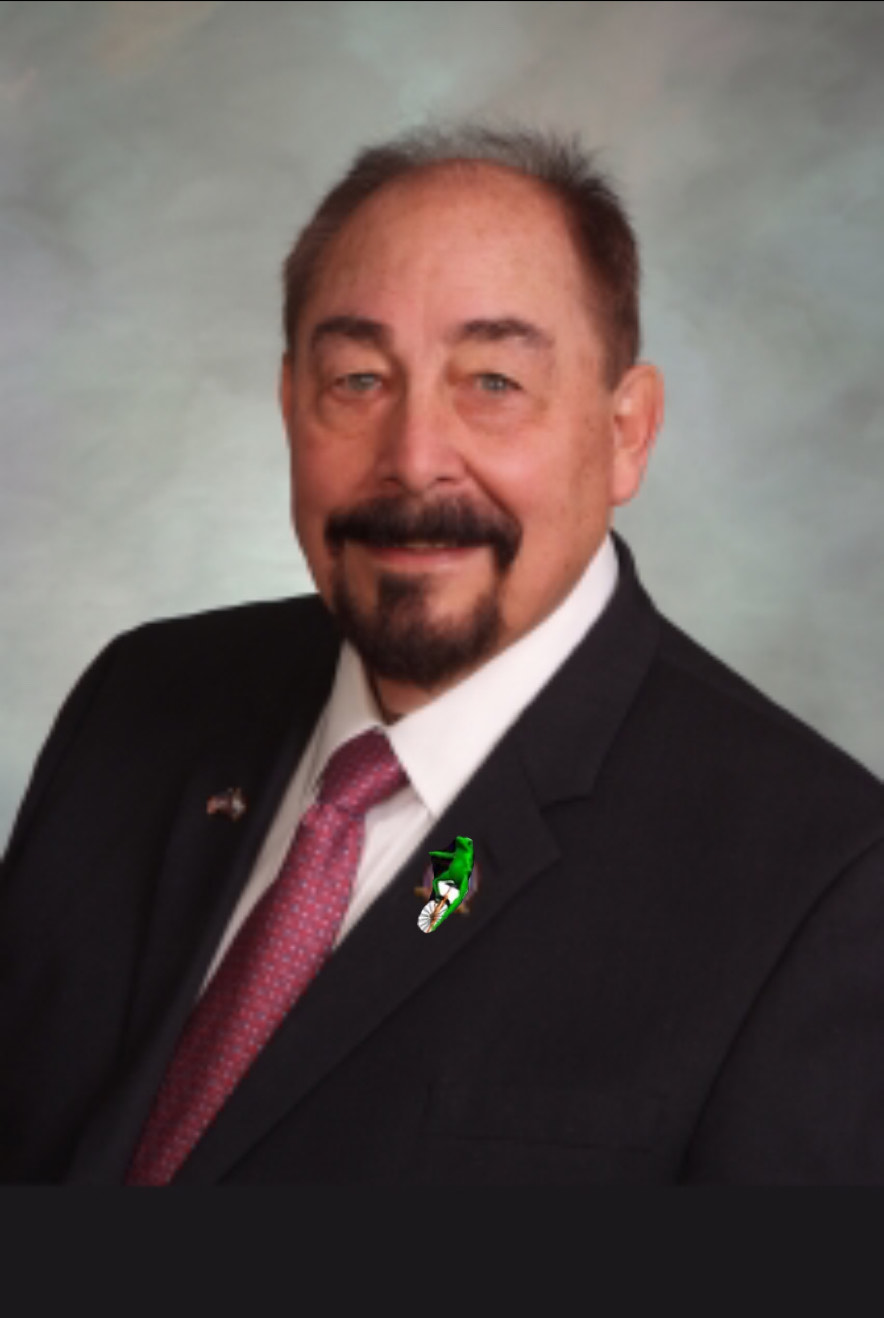

Member of the Wyoming House of Representatives from the 41st district
- In office January 10, 2017 – January 2025
- Preceded by: Ken Esquibel
- Succeeded by: Gary Brown

Personal details
- Party: Republican
- Education: University of Wyoming
- Profession: Banker

Bill Henderson is an American politician who served as a Republican member of the Wyoming House of Representatives representing District 41 from January 10, 2017 to January 2025.

== Elections ==
=== 2014 ===
Henderson challenged incumbent Republican Representative Dan Zwonitzer in the District 43 Republican primary and lost to Zwonitzer. Later that year, Henderson ran for a position on the Laramie County School District #1 Board of Trustees and lost in the general election.

=== 2016 ===
Incumbent Democratic Representative Ken Esquibel retired to run for a seat in the Wyoming Senate being vacated by Tony Ross. Henderson declared his candidacy for the seat, facing Patrick Fitzgerald in the Republican primary. Henderson defeated Fitzgerald by two votes to become the Republican nominee. He faced Democrat Amy Simpson in the general election and defeated her with 51% of the vote.

=== 2024 ===
In his attempt at re-election, Henderson was defeated in the 2024 Republican primary.
