= Martha Lawley =

American politician

Member of the Wyoming House of Representatives from the 27th district
- Incumbent
- Assumed office January 10, 2023
- Preceded by: Mike Greear

Personal details
- Born: Lake Charles, Louisiana, U.S.
- Party: Republican
- Spouse: Roger Lawley
- Children: 3
- Education: Bachelor's degree (Political Science), J.D.
- Alma mater: University of Wyoming, Baylor Law School
- Profession: Retired Attorney
- Website: http://www.marthalawley.com/meet.htm

Martha Lawley is an American Republican politician serving in the Wyoming House of Representatives for the 27th district. She won the seat in the 2022 election on November 8, 2022.

== Committees ==
Lawley currently sits on four committees. The committee of Education, the committee of Minerals, Business and Economic Development, the Department of Family Services Council, and CSG West Education.

== Personal life ==
Lawley grew up in Northern Wyoming and was Baptized at the age of nine. She got a bachelor's degree in political science, moved to Waco, Texas to attend Baylor Law School, and began working as a business litigator in Houston in 1981. She also wrote a book published in November 2005 and republished in February 2015 titled Attending the Bride of Christ: Preparing for His Return, a bible study.
