= McKay Erickson =

American politician

Member of the Wyoming House of Representatives from the 21st district
- Incumbent
- Assumed office January 6, 2025
- Preceded by: Lane Allred

Personal details
- Born: Afton, Wyoming
- Party: Republican
- Website: wyoleg.gov/Legislators/2025/H/2122

McKay Erickson is an American politician. He serves as a Republican member for the 21st district in the Wyoming House of Representatives since 2025.

On August 20, 2024, Erickson defeated T. Deb Wofley in the primary to replace retiring incumbent Lane Allred. On November 5, 2024, Erickson won the general election unopposed.

== Personal life ==
In 1992, Erickson earned a bachelor's degree from Utah State University in social studies. He was an educator for 30 years, and also worked in timber and power-line services.

Erickson has 3 children and 3 grandchildren. He is a member of the Church of Jesus Christ of Latter-Day Saints.
