= Pam Thayer =

American politician

Member of the Wyoming House of Representatives from the 15th district
- Incumbent
- Assumed office January 6, 2025
- Preceded by: Donald Burkhart

Personal details
- Party: Republican

Pamela (Pam) Thayer is an American politician. She serves as a Republican member for the 15th district in the Wyoming House of Representatives since 2025.
