= Paul Hoeft =

American politician

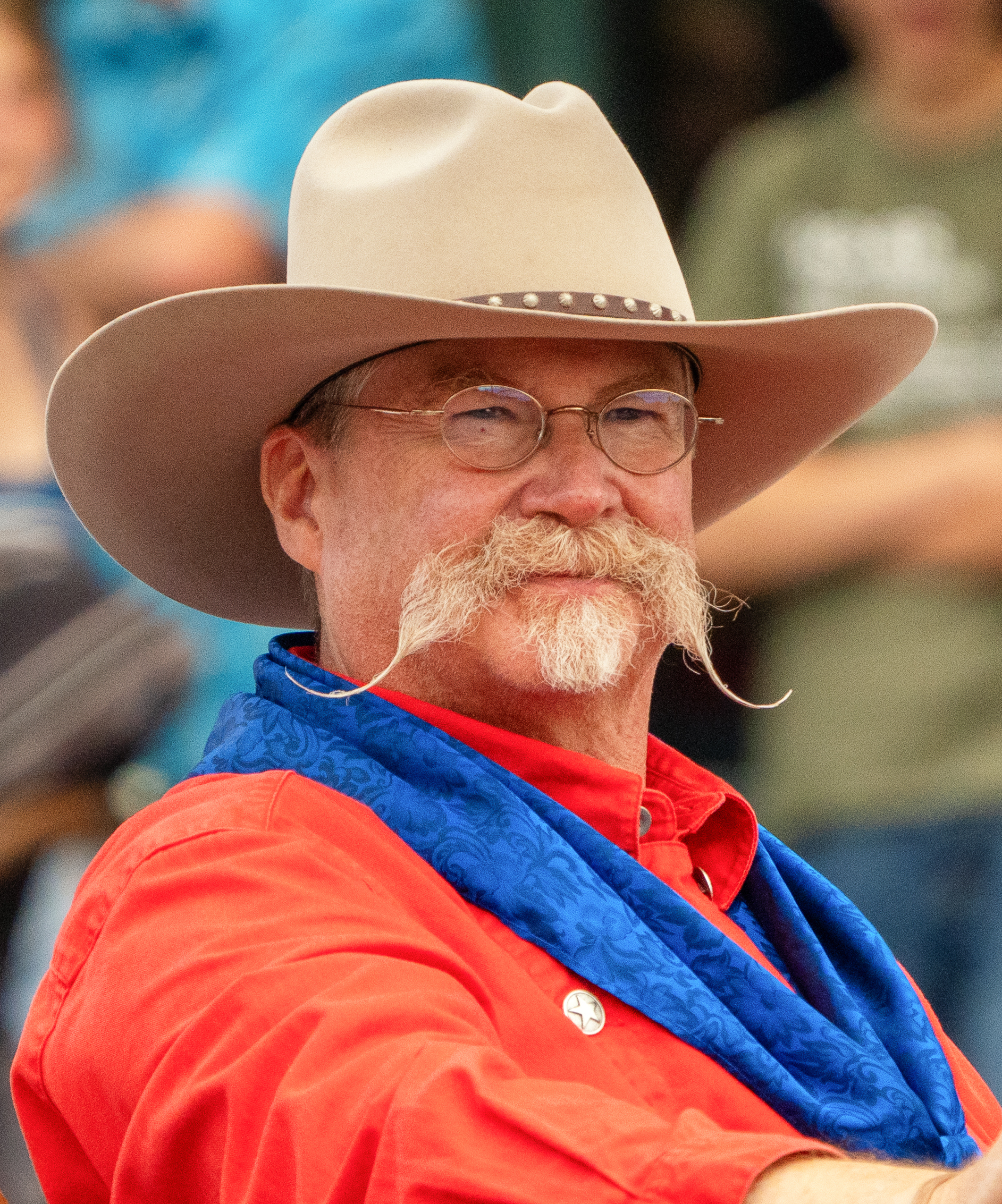
- Hoeft in 2025

Member of the Wyoming House of Representatives from the 25th district
- Incumbent
- Assumed office January 6, 2025
- Preceded by: David Northrup
- Succeeded by: John Wetzel (elect)

Personal details
- Born: Oak Harbor, Washington, U.S.
- Party: Republican
- Spouse: Rosalee Hoeft
- Children: 2

Paul Hoeft is an American politician serving as a Republican member of the Wyoming House of Representatives for the 25th district.

== Biography ==
He is a retired mechanic.

In 2024, he was elected to the Wyoming House of Representatives. In 2026 he ran for election to the Wyoming State Senate but lost the Republican primary on August 18, 2026.

He is a member of the National Rifle Association of America and the Gun Owners of America. Hoeft is also the executive director of Heart Mountain Rod & Gun Club. He is a Christian.
