= Trey Sherwood =

American politician and pastor

Terry Sherwood

Member of the Wyoming House of Representatives from the 14th district
- Incumbent
- Assumed office January 12, 2021
- Preceded by: Dan Furphy

Personal details
- Party: Democratic
- Website: treysherwood.com

Terry Sherwood is a non-profit organizer, American politician, and Democratic member of the Wyoming House of Representatives, representing the 14th district since January 12, 2021.

== Career ==
Sherwood serves as Director for Laramie Main Street, a non-profit organization that strives to preserve historic Downtown Laramie while enhancing its economic and social vitality. She is also affiliated with the Laramie Public Art Coalition. On August 18, 2020, Sherwood defeated Alexander Simon, in the Democratic primary for the Wyoming House of Representatives seat representing the 14th district. On November 3, 2020, she was elected to this position, defeating Republican Matthew Burkhart by under 100 votes. Sherwood was sworn in on January 4, 2021.

== Personal life ==
Sherwood lives in Laramie, Wyoming. She is Lutheran.
