= Ken Chestek =

American politician

Member of the Wyoming House of Representatives from the 13th district
- Incumbent
- Assumed office January 10, 2023
- Preceded by: Cathy Connolly

Personal details
- Born: Cincinnati, Ohio, U.S.
- Party: Democratic
- Education: Penn State University (BA); University of Pittsburgh (JD)
- Profession: Professor

Ken Chestek is an American educator, politician and a Democratic member of the Wyoming House of Representatives representing the 13th district since January 10, 2023. He is also a professor of law emeritus at the University of Wyoming College of Law.

== Political career ==
Chestek first ran for the Wyoming House of Representatives in 2016 when incumbent Republican representative Glenn Moniz of the 46th district retired to run for the state senate. He won the Democratic primary unopposed, but was defeated in the general election by Bill Haley, receiving 42% of the vote.

When incumbent Democrat and House Minority Leader Cathy Connolly declined to run for reelection, Chestek announced his candidacy and won the Democratic primary on August 16, 2022, unopposed. He then won the general election on November 8, 2022, defeating Republican nominee Wayne Pinch with 60% of the vote.

In 2024, Chestek ran for re-election again Republican Shane Swett. He won with 53% of the votes cast in that election.

In January 2026, Wyoming lawmakers voted to cut $40 million from the University of Wyoming. The following month, Chestek proposed an amendment that would restore this funding, arguing that these cuts would weaken the school and discourage potential students from attending. In a 34 to 26 vote, Chestek's proposal failed in the House. However, lawmakers later voted in favor of restoring $6 million for the university's athletics department in a separate proposal.
