= Darin McCann =

American politician

Member of the Wyoming House of Representatives from the 48th district
- Incumbent
- Assumed office January 6, 2025
- Preceded by: Clark Stith
- Succeeded by: James Wamsley (elect)

Personal details
- Born: Ithaca, New York, U.S.
- Party: Republican

Darin McCann is an American politician serving as a Republican member of the Wyoming House of Representatives for the 48th district. He graduated from the United States Army Medical Department Center and School in 2000. He is a physician assistant. McCann is a Christian.
