= Wyoming's 24th House of Representatives district =

American legislative district

Wyoming's 24th State House of Representatives district
- Wyoming's 24th House of Representatives district as of 2022
Representative
Nina Webber; R–Cody
- Demographics: 90% White; 1% Black; 6% Hispanic; 1% Asian; 1% Other; 2% Multiracial
- Population (2022): 9,515

Wyoming's 24th House of Representatives district is one of 62 districts in the Wyoming House of Representatives. The district encompasses part of Park County. It is represented by Republican Representative Nina Webber of Cody.

In 1992, the state of Wyoming switched from electing state legislators by county to a district-based system.

== List of members representing the district ==
Representative	Party	Term	Note
Peg Shreve	Republican	1993 – 1999	Elected in 1992. Re-elected in 1994. Re-elected in 1996.
Colin M. Simpson	Republican	1999 – 2011	Elected in 1998. Re-elected in 2000. Re-elected in 2002. Re-elected in 2004. Re-elected in 2006. Re-elected in 2008.
Sam Krone	Republican	2011 – 2017	Elected in 2010. Re-elected in 2012. Re-elected in 2014.
Scott Court	Republican	2017 – 2019	Elected in 2016.
Sandy Newsome	Republican	2019 – 2025	Elected in 2018. Re-elected in 2020. Re-elected in 2022.
Nina Webber	Republican	2025 – present	Elected in 2024.

== Recent election results ==
=== 2014 ===
House district 24 general election
Party	Candidate	Votes	%
Republican	Sam Krone (Incumbent)	2,581	95.80%
Write-ins		113	4.19%
Total votes		2,694	100.0%
Invalid or blank votes		587	
Republican hold			

=== 2016 ===
House district 24 general election
Party	Candidate	Votes	%
Republican	Scott Court	2,254	46.14%
Independent	Sandy Newsome	1,421	29.08%
Democratic	Paul Fees	1,196	24.48%
Write-ins		14	0.28%
Total votes		4,885	100.0%
Invalid or blank votes		310	
Republican hold			

=== 2018 ===
House district 24 general election
Party	Candidate	Votes	%
Republican	Sandy Newsome	2,759	72.07%
Democratic	Paul Fees	1,047	27.35%
Write-ins		22	0.57%
Total votes		3,828	100.0%
Invalid or blank votes		172	
Republican hold			

=== 2020 ===
House district 24 general election
Party	Candidate	Votes	%
Republican	Sandy Newsome (Incumbent)	4,009	92.95%
Write-ins		304	7.04%
Total votes		4,313	100.0%
Invalid or blank votes		1111	
Republican hold			

=== 2022 ===
House district 24 general election
Party	Candidate	Votes	%
Republican	Sandy Newsome (Incumbent)	2,809	82.52%
Write-ins		595	17.47%
Total votes		3,404	100.0%
Invalid or blank votes		655	
Republican hold			

=== 2024 ===
House district 24 general election
Party	Candidate	Votes	%
Republican	Nina Webber	3,372	81.70%
Write-ins		755	18.29%
Total votes		4,127	100.0%
Invalid or blank votes		1,101	
Republican hold			

== Historical district boundaries ==
Map	Description	Apportionment Plan	Notes
	Park County (part)	1992 Apportionment Plan	
	Park County (part)	2002 Apportionment Plan	
	Park County (part)	2012 Apportionment Plan	
