= Julie Jarvis =

American politician

Member of the Wyoming House of Representatives from the 57th district
- Incumbent
- Assumed office January 6, 2025
- Preceded by: Jeanette Ward

Personal details
- Born: Buffalo, Wyoming, U.S.
- Party: Republican
- Children: 2

Julie Jarvis is an American politician serving as a Republican member of the Wyoming House of Representatives for the 57th district. She graduated from the University of Bridgeport with a bachelor's in 2000, and a master's in 2001. She earned a doctorate from the University of Connecticut in 2018. Jarvis was born in Buffalo, Wyoming, and raised on a farm near there. She is a Christian.
