= Laurie Bratten =

American politician

Member of the Wyoming House of Representatives from the 51st district
- Incumbent
- Assumed office January 6, 2025
- Preceded by: Cyrus Western

Personal details
- Born: Cincinnati, Ohio, U.S.
- Party: Republican
- Spouse: Rich
- Children: 2

Laurie Bratten is an American politician serving as a Republican member of the Wyoming House of Representatives for the 51st district. She graduated from Miami University with a bachelor's in education/biological science in 1983. She is an agricultural business owner. Bratten is a Christian.
