= Mike Yin =

American politician (born 1986)

Minority Leader of the Wyoming House of Representatives
- Incumbent
- Assumed office January 10, 2023
- Preceded by: Cathy Connolly

Member of the Wyoming House of Representatives from the 16th district
- Incumbent
- Assumed office January 7, 2019
- Preceded by: Mike Gierau

Personal details
- Born: March 14, 1986 (age 40) Atlanta, Georgia, U.S.
- Party: Democratic
- Education: Carnegie Mellon University (BS)
- Website: Campaign website

Michael Stephen Yin (Note: Chinese: 尹嘉和; pinyin: Yǐn Jiāhé) (born March 14, 1986) is an American politician, software engineer, and businessman. A Democrat, he has represented District 16 of the Wyoming House of Representatives since 2018. Yin is Wyoming's first Chinese-American legislator.

Since 2023, Yin has served as Minority Leader in the Wyoming House of Representatives. Yin is also the president of OtterSpace, a company that builds electric vehicle charging stations in Wyoming. He is the chamber's most senior Democrat.

== Early life and education ==
Yin was born in Atlanta, Georgia, to immigrant parents. His father, Alfred Somboun Yin, (Note: Chinese: 尹茂達; pinyin: Yǐn Màodá) was from Yunnan, while his mother, Wooiyi Tan Yin, (Note: Chinese: 陳徽儀; pinyin: Chén Huīyí) was Malaysian Chinese. Yin grew up in a Republican-voting household.

Yin graduated from Carnegie Mellon University with a degree in computer science. He has said he moved to Wyoming due to the state's natural beauty.

== Private sector career ==
Yin is a professional software developer and worked in the technology industry for a decade before his election in 2016. In 2021, Yin founded OtterSpace, a Wyoming-based company that constructs charging stations for electric vehicles (EVs). The company opened four charging stations in the state in 2023, solely relying on private funds.

== Political career ==
Before his election to the Wyoming House of Representatives, Yin served as vice chair of the Teton County Democratic Party. He canvassed in support of Bernie Sanders's campaign during the 2016 Democratic primary and for Hillary Clinton in the general election.

=== Wyoming House of Representatives ===
==== 2018 election ====
In 2018, Yin ran to represent district 16 in the Wyoming House of Representatives. The district covers most of the town of Jackson south of Broadway Street. Yin ran unopposed for the Democratic nomination and faced Republican Barbara Allen in the general election. Allen led in a local poll conducted by the Buckrail media outlet.

Analysis from The Casper Star-Tribune in 2018 found that Yin would likely be the second Asian American elected to the body, after Indian-born legislator Nimi McConigley, who served from 1994 to 1996. Yin won the election, 59.6% to 40.3%.

==== Tenure (2018-present) ====
During his first term in office, Yin served on a select committee on Blockchain, Financial Technology and Digital Innovation Technology. He sponsored legislation to raise Wyoming's minimum wage and protect access to contraceptives. In December 2019, he was part of a group of Asian American legislators who traveled to Japan as part of a program created by the U.S.-Japan Council and the Sasakawa Peace Foundation. He was reelected in 2020 without opposition, after which he was selected to serve on the Revenue Committee and the House Judiciary Committee.

In 2021, Yin cosponsored legislation to introduce a 4% state income tax to fund education. In the 2022 election, he defeated Republican Jim McCollum, 73.8% to 25.9%. In November 2022, he was elected by the Democratic caucus in the House of Representatives to serve as Minority Leader.

== Electoral history ==
Wyoming House of Representatives' 16th district election, 2022
Party	Candidate	Votes	%	±%
Democratic	Mike Yin (incumbent)	2,477	73.8	–22.5
Republican	Jim McCollum	869	25.9	N/A
Write-in		9	0.3	–3.4
Total votes		3,355	100%	
Democratic hold				

Wyoming House of Representatives' 16th district election, 2020
Party	Candidate	Votes	%	±%
Democratic	Mike Yin (incumbent)	4,327	96.3%	+36.7
Write-in		168	3.7%	+3.6
Total votes		4,495	100.0%	
Democratic hold				

Wyoming House of Representatives' 16th district election, 2018
Party	Candidate	Votes	%
Democratic	Mike Yin	2,530	59.6
Republican	Barbara Allen	1,712	40.3
Write-in		4	0.1
Total votes		4,246	100%
Democratic hold			

== Notes ==
Wyoming House of Representatives
Preceded by Cathy Connolly	Minority Leader of the Wyoming House of Representatives; 2023–present	Incumbent
