= Elissa Campbell =

American politician

Member of the Wyoming House of Representatives from the 56th district
- Incumbent
- Assumed office January 6, 2025
- Preceded by: Jerry Obermueller

Personal details
- Born: Laramie, Wyoming, U.S.
- Party: Republican
- Children: 2

Elissa Campbell is an American politician serving as a Republican member of the Wyoming House of Representatives for the 56th district. She graduated from the University of Wyoming in 1994 with a bachelor's in philosophy and environmental ethics. She is a business owner.
