= Marilyn Connolly =

American politician

Member of the Wyoming House of Representatives from the 40th district
- Incumbent
- Assumed office January 6, 2025
- Preceded by: Barry Crago

Personal details
- Born: Worland, Wyoming, U.S.
- Party: Republican

Marilyn Connolly is an American politician serving as a Republican member of the Wyoming House of Representatives for the 40th district. She is a former Johnson County Commissioner. She is a Christian.
