= Jayme Lien =

American politician

Member of the Wyoming House of Representatives from the 38th district
- Incumbent
- Assumed office January 6, 2025
- Preceded by: Tom Walters
- Succeeded by: Robert Hendry (elect)

Personal details
- Party: Republican

Jayme Lien is an American politician. She serves as a Republican member for the 38th district of the Wyoming House of Representatives.
