= Joel Guggenmos =

American politician

Member of the Wyoming House of Representatives from the 55th district
- Incumbent
- Assumed office January 6, 2025
- Preceded by: Ember Oakley
- Succeeded by: Carl Manning (elect)

Personal details
- Born: Scottsbluff, Nebraska, U.S.
- Party: Republican

Joel Guggenmos is an American politician serving as a Republican member of the Wyoming House of Representatives for the 55th district. He was born in Scottsbluff, Nebraska, and raised in Riverton, Wyoming. He was homeschooled.
