= Rob Geringer =

American politician

Member of the Wyoming House of Representatives from the 42nd district
- Incumbent
- Assumed office January 6, 2025
- Preceded by: Ben Hornok

Personal details
- Party: Republican
- Spouse: Crystal
- Children: 3

Rob Geringer is an American politician serving as a Republican member of the Wyoming House of Representatives for the 42nd district. He graduated from Wheatland High School in Wheatland, Wyoming, in 1991. He graduated from the University of Wyoming with a bachelor's in civil engineering in 1995, and from the University of Colorado with a master's in engineering in 2000. Geringer is a business owner and a former board member of the Cheyenne Housing Authority. He is a Christian.
