= Ann Lucas =

American politician

Member of the Wyoming House of Representatives from the 43rd district
- Incumbent
- Assumed office January 6, 2025
- Preceded by: Dan Zwonitzer
- Succeeded by: Jessica Crowder (elect)

Personal details
- Born: Chicago, Illinois, U.S.
- Party: Republican
- Spouse: Patrick Lucas
- Children: 4

Ann Lucas is an American politician serving as a Republican member of the Wyoming House of Representatives for the 43rd district. She is a retired banker. She is a Presbyterian.
