= Nina Webber =

American politician

Member of the Wyoming House of Representatives from the 24th district
- Incumbent
- Assumed office January 6, 2025
- Preceded by: Sandy Newsome

Personal details
- Born: Casper, Wyoming
- Party: Republican
- Website: wyoleg.gov/Legislators/2025/H/2123

Nina D. Webber is an American politician. She serves as a Republican member for the 24th district in the Wyoming House of Representatives since 2025.

In 2014, Webber was approached by the Hot Springs County, Wyoming Republican Committee to apply for county clerk. In March 2014, she was appointed to the position to fill the remainder of the unfilled term of the prior clerk. She was elected to a full term on November 4, 2014. She served as county clerk until December 31, 2018.

In 2020, Webber ran for Wyoming House of Representatives in the 24th district against incumbent Sandy Newsome. She ran on a platform of protecting the Second Amendment, promoting firearms business, and shifting the Wyoming Republican Party to be more conservative. In an interview with Cody Enterprise, she called Newsome a "Democrat masquerading as a conservative Republican," claiming that Newsome was insufficiently conservative in her votes. She lost in the primary, garnering 34.5% of the voter to Newsome's 49.3%.

On September 9, 2021, Wyoming RNC Committeewoman Harriet Hageman announced her candidacy for Wyoming's at-large congressional district, challenging three-term incumbent Liz Cheney. Then, at the Wyoming Republican Party meeting that year, Webber was unanimously elected to represent Wyoming at the RNC.

On August 20, 2024, Webber defeated Cody, Wyoming mayor Matt Hall in the primary to replace retiring incumbent Sandy Newsome. Newsome had previously indicated her support for Hall. On November 5, 2024, Webber won the general election unopposed.

== Personal life ==
Webber was born in Casper and spent most of her young life on grandfather's ranches in Farson, Wyoming and Lander, Wyoming. Webber graduated from the University of Wyoming with a bachelor's degree in marketing and human resources. She also has a Master's in Business Administration from the University of Mary. She previously worked as a "Land Man" at GAS Ventures. She attends services at Cody Cowboy Church

She is a member of the Wyoming Republican Women, Riding for the Brand, Wyoming Right to Life, Gun Owners of America, and Wyoming Gun Owners.

On November 30, 2022, Webber was charged with reckless endangerment for unsafe elk hunting. However, the charges were later dropped.
