= Tomi Strock =

American politician

Member of the Wyoming House of Representatives from the 6th district
- Incumbent
- Assumed office January 10, 2023
- Preceded by: Aaron Clausen

Personal details
- Born: Douglas, Wyoming, U.S.
- Party: Republican
- Profession: Rancher

Tomi Strock is an American politician and a Republican member of the Wyoming House of Representatives representing the 6th district since January 10, 2023.

== Political career ==
Strock ran against incumbent Republican representative Aaron Clausen in the Republican primary on August 16, 2022, and narrowly defeated Clausen by 56 votes with 51% of the vote. She then won the general election on November 8, 2022, defeating independent candidate Bruce Jones and Democratic nominee Hank Szramkowski with 64% of the vote.
