= Gary Brown (Wyoming politician) =

American politician

Member of the Wyoming House of Representatives from the 41st district
- Incumbent
- Assumed office January 6, 2025
- Preceded by: Bill Henderson
- Succeeded by: Erin Edwards (elect)

Personal details
- Party: Republican

Gary Brown is an American politician. He serves as a Republican member for the 41st district of the Wyoming House of Representatives.
