= Kevin Campbell (Wyoming politician) =

American politician

Member of the Wyoming House of Representatives from the 62nd district
- Incumbent
- Assumed office January 6, 2025
- Preceded by: Forrest Chadwick

Personal details
- Born: Cheyenne, Wyoming, U.S.
- Party: Republican
- Children: 5

Kevin Campbell is an American politician serving as a Republican member of the Wyoming House of Representatives for the 62nd district. He works in oilfield services. He is a member of Jesse Martin American Legion Post #009, Wyoming Wool Growers, Navajo-Churro Sheep Association, Benevolent and Protective Order of Elks #1353, and the Wyoming Historical Society. Campbell is a Protestant.
