= Chip Neiman =

American politician and pastor

Speaker of the Wyoming House of Representatives
- Incumbent
- Assumed office January 14, 2025
- Preceded by: Albert Sommers

Majority Leader of the Wyoming House of Representatives
- In office January 10, 2023 – January 14, 2025
- Preceded by: Albert Sommers
- Succeeded by: Scott Heiner

Member of the Wyoming House of Representatives from the 1st district
- Incumbent
- Assumed office January 12, 2021
- Preceded by: Tyler Lindholm
- Succeeded by: Troy Claycomb (elect)

Personal details
- Born: Crook County, Wyoming, U.S.
- Party: Republican
- Website: Campaign website

Chip Neiman is an American rancher and politician who has been a member of the Wyoming House of Representatives representing the 1st district since 2021. He has served as speaker of the House since 2025.

== Political career ==
On August 18, 2020, Neiman defeated incumbent state representative, Tyler Lindholm, in the Republican primary for the Wyoming House of Representatives 1st district. Neiman won by fewer than 200 votes. On November 3, 2020, Neiman was elected to this position, unopposed. Neiman was sworn in on January 4, 2021.

Neiman was elected as the Republican nominee for majority floor leader in the state House of Representatives in November 2022. The appointment was seen as representing “the growing power of a more conservative wing of the Republican Party”.

In 2025, he became speaker of the House.

== Personal life ==
Neiman lives in Hulett, Wyoming. He and his wife Joni have two children and four grandchildren. Neiman is Christian and attends Hulett Assemblies of God, a church affiliated with the Assemblies of God. He is also affiliated with Vocations for Orphans and the Greater Hulett Community Center.

Neiman's family have been involved in logging and timber production in northeast Wyoming and the Black Hills since 1936.

Wyoming House of Representatives
Preceded by Albert Sommers	Majority Leader of the Wyoming House of Representatives; 2023–2025	Succeeded by Scott Heiner
Political offices
Preceded by Albert Sommers	Speaker of the Wyoming House of Representatives; 2025–present	Incumbent
