= Rachel Rodriguez-Williams =

Wyoming politician

Rachel Williams

Member of the Wyoming House of Representatives from the 50th district
- Incumbent
- Assumed office January 4, 2021
- Preceded by: David Northrup

Personal details
- Born: February 14, 1978 (age 48)
- Party: Republican
- Education: Sonoma State University (BA); Columbia Southern University (MS)

Rachel Rodriguez-Williams is an American Republican politician and businesswoman serving as a member of the Wyoming House of Representatives from the 50th district. Elected in November 2020, she assumed office on January 4, 2021.

== Early life and education ==
A native of northern California, Rodriguez-Williams earned a Bachelor of Arts degree in criminal justice and law enforcement administration from Sonoma State University and a Master of Science in criminal justice from Columbia Southern University.

== Career ==
Rodriguez-Williams worked as a law enforcement officer in Marin County. She moved to Cody, Wyoming, in 2007. From 2017 to 2023, she was the director of the Serenity Pregnancy Resource Center in Wyoming, and served on the board of a number of local organizations.

== Political career ==
After David Northrup chose not to run again, Rodriguez-Williams and Johnson Bennett ran against each other. Rodriguez-Williams received 4,370 votes (77%), while Bennett only received 1,240 votes (22%). The district encompasses the cities of Ralston, Heart Mountain, Sunlight, Crandall, the Willwood area south of Powell, and the eastern part of the Cody.

Rodriguez-Williams was elected to the Wyoming House of Representatives in November 2020 and assumed office on January 4, 2021.

=== Tenure ===
Rodriguez-Williams sponsored House Bill 175, which would have required school districts to provide suicide awareness and prevention programs to Wyoming students grades six through 12. However, the bill died in the house.

While a state-owned office building was being constructed in Casper, Rodriguez-Williams voted in favor of a bill that would've named the building after former Wyoming representative John S. Wold. However, the bill failed in the house on a vote of 14–46, and the building was instead named after Thyra Thomson, who served as the Secretary of State of Wyoming from 1963 to 1987. The building opened in April 2022.

In 2023, Rodriguez-Williams sponsored H.B. 152, the Life Is a Human Right Act, which would make surgical and medication-assisted abortions illegal. She said that "other states are pushing an extreme abortion agenda, comparable to North Korea's and China's inhumane laws". The new law attempts to circumvent an interpretation of the Wyoming Constitution that protects citizens' "right to make one's own health care decisions", stating that "[i]nstead of being health care, abortion is the intentional termination of the life of an unborn baby."

Rodriguez-Williams is also a member of WYCAN, Wyoming Citizens Against Normalization, a group that is dedicated to the prohibition of cannabis products in Wyoming.
