= Wyoming House of Representatives =

Lower house of Wyoming's state legislature

Coordinates: 41°08′25″N 104°49′13″W

- 68th Wyoming State Legislature

Type
- Type: Lower house
- Term limits: None

History
- New session started: January 14, 2025

Leadership
- Speaker: Chip Neiman (R) since January 14, 2025
- Speaker pro tempore: Jeremy Haroldson (R) since January 14, 2025
- Majority Leader: Scott Heiner (R) since January 14, 2025
- Minority Leader: Mike Yin (D) since January 10, 2023

Structure
- Seats: 62
- Political groups: Majority (56): Republican (56); Minority (6): Democratic (6)
- Length of term: 2 years
- Authority: Article 3, Wyoming Constitution
- Salary: $150/day + per diem

Elections
- Last election: November 5, 2024 (62 seats)
- Next election: November 3, 2026 (62 seats)
- Redistricting: Legislative Control

Meeting place
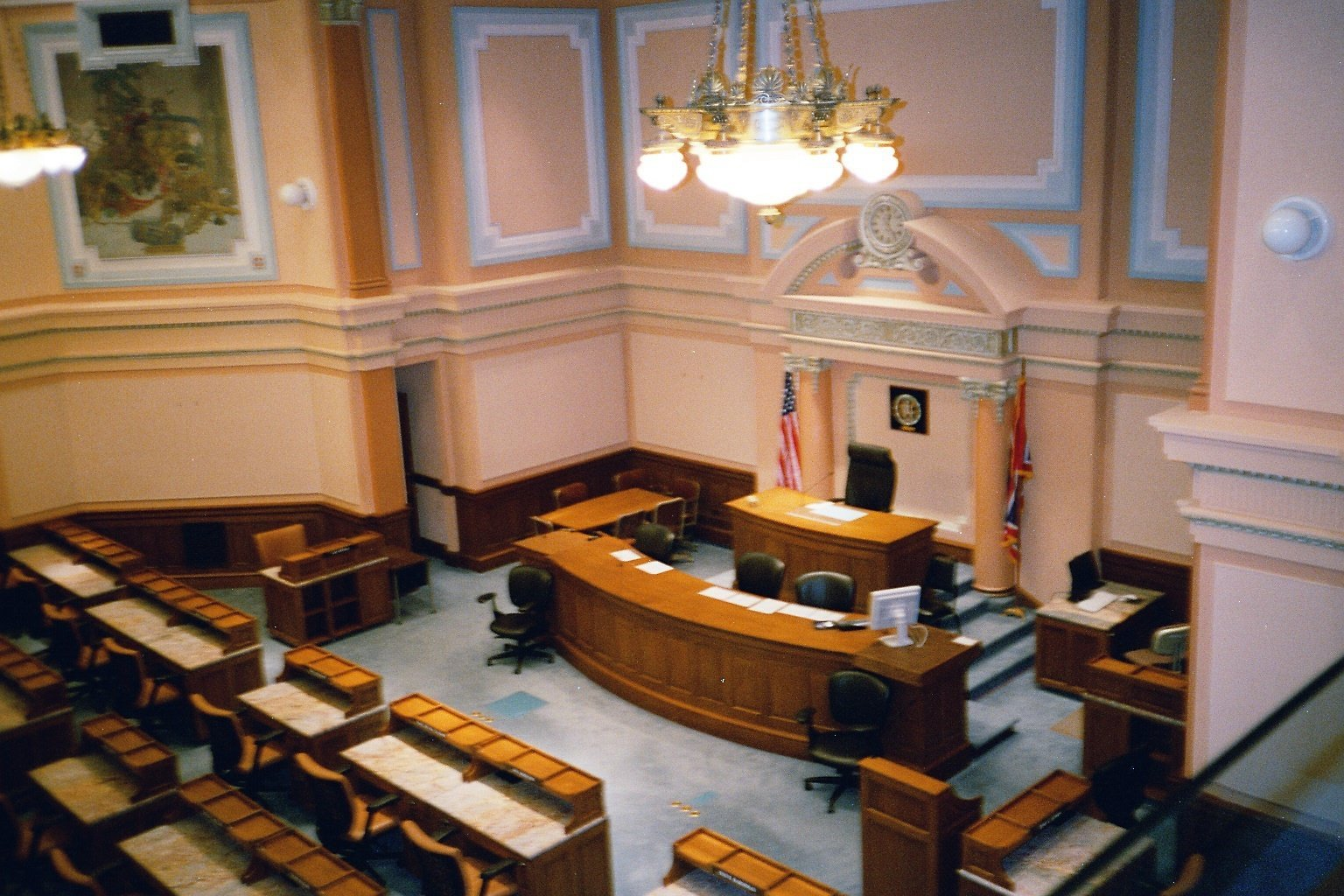
- House of Representatives Chamber; Wyoming State Capitol; Cheyenne, Wyoming

Website
- Wyoming State Legislature

The Wyoming House of Representatives is the lower house of the Wyoming State Legislature. There are 62 representatives in the House, representing an equal number of single-member constituent districts across the state, each with a population of at least 9,000. The House convenes at the Wyoming State Capitol in Cheyenne.

Members of the House serve two year terms without term limits. Term limits were declared unconstitutional by the Wyoming Supreme Court in 2004, overturning a decade-old law that had restricted Representatives to six terms (twelve years).

The current Speaker of the House is Chip Neiman.

== Composition of the House of Representatives ==
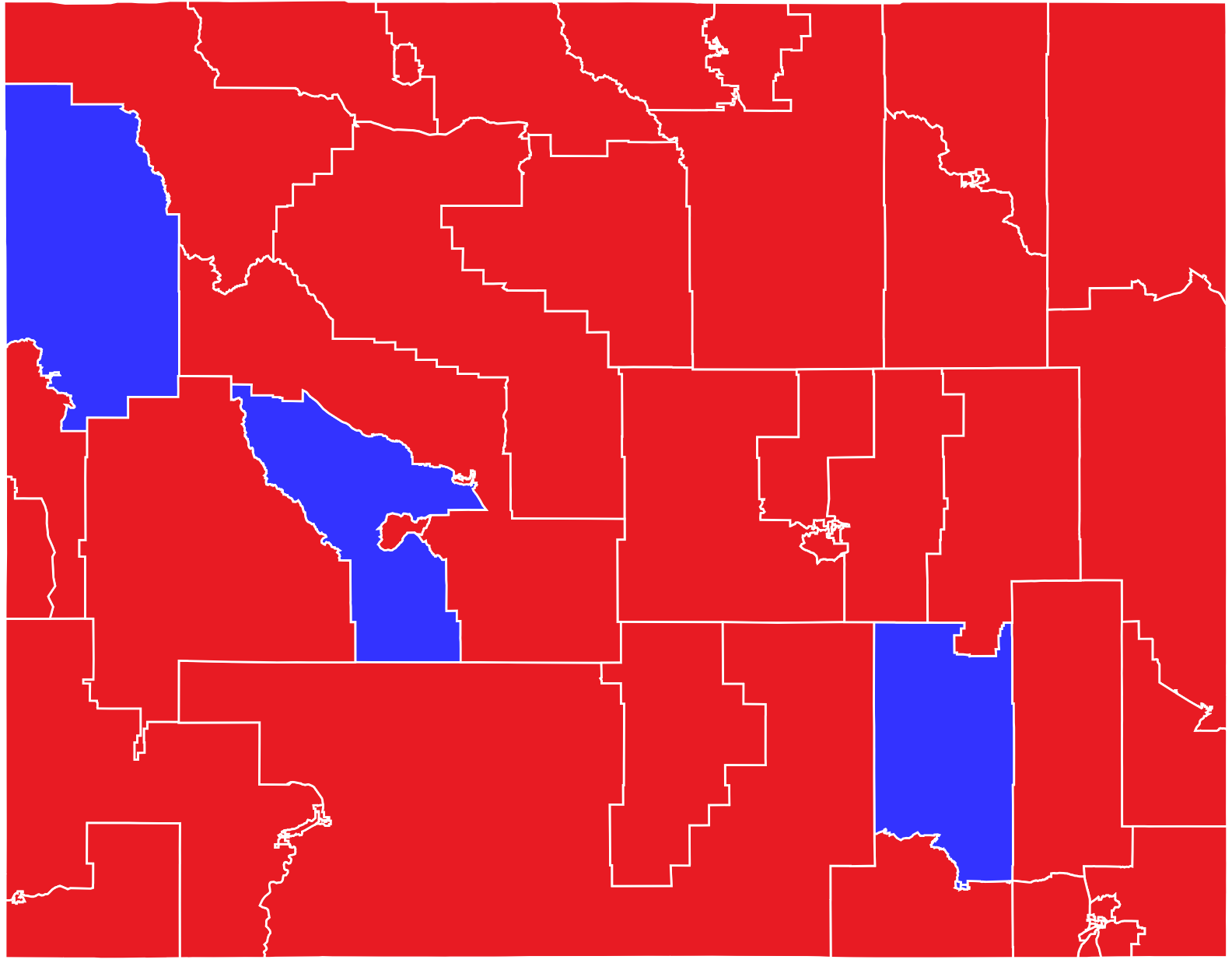
Map of current districts, colored by sitting representative's party Republican Democratic

Affiliation	Party (Shading indicates majority caucus)		Total	Vacant
Affiliation	Republican	Democratic	Total	Vacant
End of the 67th Legislature	57	5	62	0
Beginning of the 68th Legislature	56	6	62	0
Latest voting share	90%	10%	0%	

=== Leadership ===
Position	Name	Party	District
Speaker of the House	Chip Neiman	Republican	1
Majority Leader	Scott Heiner	Republican	18
Speaker pro tempore	Jeremy Haroldson	Republican	4
Majority Whip	Ocean Andrew	Republican	46
Minority Leader	Mike Yin	Democratic	16
Minority Whip	Karlee Provenza	Democratic	45
Minority Caucus Chairman	Trey Sherwood	Democratic	14

=== Members of the Wyoming House of Representatives ===
District	Name	Party	Residence	Counties	Start
1	Chip Neiman	Republican	Hulett	Crook, Weston	2020
2	J. D. Williams	Republican	Lusk	Converse, Goshen, Niobrara, Weston	2024
3	Abby Angelos	Republican	Gillette	Converse, Campbell	2022
4	Jeremy Haroldson	Republican	Wheatland	Platte	2020
5	Scott Smith	Republican	Lingle	Goshen, Platte	2022
6	Tomi Strock	Republican	Douglas	Converse	2022
7	Bob Nicholas	Republican	Cheyenne	Laramie	2010
8	Steve Johnson	Republican	Cheyenne	Laramie	2024
9	Landon Brown	Republican	Cheyenne	Laramie	2016
10	Justin Fornstrom	Republican	Pine Bluffs	Laramie	2025 (Note: Originally appointed.)
11	Jacob Wasserburger	Republican	Cheyenne	Laramie	2024
12	Clarence Styvar	Republican	Cheyenne	Laramie	2018
13	Ken Chestek	Democratic	Laramie	Albany	2022
14	Trey Sherwood	Democratic	Laramie	Albany	2020
15	Pam Thayer	Republican	Rawlins	Carbon	2024
16	Mike Yin	Democratic	Jackson	Teton	2018
17	J. T. Larson	Republican	Rock Springs	Sweetwater	2022
18	Scott Heiner	Republican	Green River	Sweetwater, Uinta	2020
19	Joseph Webb	Republican	Lyman	Uinta	2024
20	Michael Schmid	Republican	La Bargé	Sublette	2024
21	McKay Erickson	Republican	Afton	Lincoln	2024
22	Andrew Byron	Republican	Jackson	Lincoln, Sublette, Teton	2022
23	Liz Storer	Democratic	Jackson	Teton	2022
24	Nina Webber	Republican	Cody	Park	2024
25	Paul Hoeft	Republican	Powell	Park	2024
26	Dalton Banks	Republican	Cowley	Big Horn, Park	2022
27	Martha Lawley	Republican	Worland	Washakie	2022
28	John Winter	Republican	Thermopolis	Big Horn, Hot Springs, Park, Fremont	2018
29	Ken Pendergraft	Republican	Sheridan	Sheridan	2020
30	Tom Kelly	Republican	Sheridan	Sheridan	2024
31	John Bear	Republican	Gillette	Campbell	2020
32	Ken Clouston	Republican	Gillette	Campbell	2022
33	Ivan Posey	Democratic	Fort Washakie	Fremont	2024
34	Pepper Ottman	Republican	Riverton	Fremont	2020
35	Tony Locke	Republican	Casper	Natrona	2022
36	Art Washut	Republican	Casper	Natrona	2018
37	Steve Harshman	Republican	Casper	Natrona	2002
38	Jayme Lien	Republican	Casper	Natrona	2024
39	Cody Wylie	Republican	Rock Springs	Sweetwater	2022
40	Marilyn Connolly	Republican	Buffalo	Johnson, Sheridan	2024
41	Gary Brown	Republican	Cheyenne	Laramie	2024
42	Rob Geringer	Republican	Cheyenne	Laramie	2024
43	Ann Lucas	Republican	Cheyenne	Laramie	2024
44	Lee Filer (Note: Filer previously served in the state house from 2013–2015.)	Republican	Cheyenne	Laramie	2024
45	Karlee Provenza	Democratic	Laramie	Albany	2020
46	Ocean Andrew	Republican	Laramie	Albany	2020
47	Bob Davis	Republican	Baggs	Albany, Carbon, Sweetwater	2022
48	Darin McCann	Republican	Rock Springs	Sweetwater	2024
49	Robert Wharff (Note: Wharff previously served in the state house from 2021–2023.)	Republican	Evanston	Uinta	2024
50	Rachel Rodriguez-Williams	Republican	Cody	Park	2020
51	Laurie Bratten	Republican	Sheridan	Sheridan	2024
52	Reuben Tarver	Republican	Gillette	Campbell	2022
53	Chris Knapp	Republican	Gillette	Campbell	2020
54	Lloyd Larsen	Republican	Lander	Fremont	2012
55	Joel Guggenmos	Republican	Riverton	Fremont	2024
56	Elissa Campbell	Republican	Casper	Natrona	2024
57	Julie Jarvis	Republican	Casper	Natrona	2024
58	Bill Allemand	Republican	Midwest	Natrona	2022
59	J. R. Riggins	Republican	Casper	Natrona	2024
60	Marlene Brady	Republican	Green River	Sweetwater	2024
61	Daniel Singh	Republican	Cheyenne	Laramie	2022
62	Kevin Campbell	Republican	Glenrock	Carbon, Natrona	2024

=== Current committees and members ===
==== Judiciary ====
Chairman

▌Art Washut

Members

▌Marlene Brandy
▌Laurie Bratten
▌Ken Chestek
▌Lee Filer
▌Tom Kelly
▌Jayme Lien
▌Daniel Singh
▌Joseph Webb

==== Appropriations ====
Chairman

▌John Bear

Members

▌Bill Allemand
▌Abby Angelos
▌Jeremy Haroldson
▌Ken Pendergraft
▌Trey Sherwood
▌Scott Smith

==== Revenue ====
Chairman

▌Tony Locke

Members

▌Gary Brown
▌Kevin Campbell
▌Jayme Lien
▌Ann Lucas
▌J.R. Riggins
▌Liz Storer
▌Clarence Styvar
▌Robert Wharff

==== Education ====
Chairman

▌Ocean Andrew

Members

▌Laurie Bratten
▌McKay Erickson
▌Joel Guggenmos
▌Tom Kelly
▌Martha Lawley
▌Daniel Singh
▌Tomi Strock
▌J.D. Williams

==== Agriculture, State and Public Lands & Water Resources ====
Chairman

▌John Winter

Members

▌Dalton Banks
▌Bob Davis
▌Steve Johnson
▌Pepper Ottman
▌Karlee Provenza
▌Mike Schmid
▌Tomi Strock

==== Travel, Recreation, Wildlife & Cultural Resources ====
Chairman

▌Andrew Byron

Members

▌Elissa Campbell
▌Marilyn Connolly
▌Steve Harshman
▌Julie Jarvis
▌Karlee Provenza
▌Liz Storer
▌Pam Thayer
▌Robert Wharff

==== Corporations, Elections & Political Subdivisions ====
Chairman

▌Chris Knapp

Members

▌Gary Brown
▌Paul Hoeft
▌Steve Johnson
▌Tony Locke
▌Ann Lucas
▌Joe Webb
▌Nina Webber
▌Mike Yin

==== Transportation, Highways & Military Affairs ====
Chairman

▌Landon Brown

Members

▌Dalton Banks
▌Rob Geringer
▌Lloyd Larsen
▌Darin McCann
▌Bob Nicholas
▌Ivan Posey
▌Reuben Tarver
▌Cody Wylie

==== Minerals, Business & Economic Development ====
Chairman

▌Scott Heiner

Members

▌Kevin Campbell
▌Christopher Knapp
▌J.T. Larson
▌Martha Lawley
▌J.R. Riggins
▌Mike Schmid
▌Reuben Tarver
▌Nina Webber

==== Labor, Health & Social Services ====
Chairman

▌Rachel Rodriguez-Williams

Members

▌Ken Clouston
▌Joel Guggenmos
▌Paul Hoeft
▌Darin McCann
▌Pepper Ottman
▌Clarence Styvar
▌Jacob Wasserburger
▌Mike Yin

==== Journal ====
Chairman

▌Julie Jarvis

Members

▌Ivan Posey

==== Rules & Procedure ====
Chairman

▌Chip Neiman

Members

▌Bill Allemand
▌Abby Angelos
▌John Bear
▌Ken Chestek
▌Scott Heiner
▌Ken Pendergraft
▌Karlee Provenza
▌Rachel Rodriguez-Williams
▌Scott Smith
▌Mike Yin

== Past composition of the House of Representatives ==
Affiliation	Party (Shading indicates majority caucus)				Total	
Affiliation	Republican	Democratic	Ind	Lib	Total	Vacant
57th Legislature (2003-2004)	45	15	0		60	0
58th Legislature (2005-2006)	46	14	0		60	0
59th Legislature (2007-2008)	43	17	0		60	0
60th Legislature (2009-2010)	41	19	0		60	0
61st Legislature (2011-2012)	50	10	0		60	0
62nd Legislature (2013-2014)	52	8	0		60	0
63rd Legislature (2015-2016)	51	9	0		60	0
64th Legislature (2017-2018)	51	9	0		60	0
65th Legislature (2019-2020)	50	9	1	0	60	0
66th Legislature (2021-2022)	51	7	1	1	60	0
67th Legislature (2023-2024)	57	5	0		62	0

== See also ==
- Wyoming State Capitol
- Wyoming State Legislature
- Wyoming State Senate
- List of Wyoming state legislatures
- List of Wyoming House of Representatives districts
