= 2016 Wyoming elections =

Wyoming's state elections were held on November 8, 2016. All 60 seats of the Wyoming Legislature and 15 seats (half) of the Wyoming Senate were up for election.

== Federal Elections ==
=== Presidential Election ===
U.S. presidential election in Wyoming, 2016
Party	Candidate	Votes	%
Republican	Donald Trump	174,419	68.2
Democratic	Hillary Clinton	55,973	21.9
Libertarian	Gary Johnson	13,287	5.2
Green	Jill Stein	2,515	1.0
Constitution	Darrell Castle	2,042	0.8
Reform	Rocky de la Fuente	709	0.3
Write-in	Other	6,904	2.7
Total votes		251,723	100

=== House at-large District ===
Wyoming's at-large congressional district election, 2016
Party	Candidate	Votes	%
Republican	Liz Cheney	156,141	62.0
Democratic	Ryan Greene	75,449	30.0
Constitution	Daniel Clyde Cummings	10,363	4.1
Libertarian	Lawrence Gerard Struempf	9,031	3.6
Write-in	Other	739	0.3
Total votes		251,723	100

== Wyoming Legislature ==
=== Summary ===
Senate

Affiliation	Candidates	Votes	Vote %	Seats Won	Seats After
Republican	14	85,881	71.04%	14 (▲1)	27
Democratic	11	26,440	21.87%	1 (▼1)	3
Independent	2	8,570	7.09%	0	
Total	27	120,891	100%	15	

House of Representatives

Affiliation	Candidates	Votes	Vote %	Seats Won
Republican	55	163,470	69.31%	51
Democratic	50	68,510	29.05%	9
Constitution	2	2,186	0.93%	0
Independent	2	1,671	0.71%	0
Total	109	235,837	100%	60

=== State Senate ===
District	Party	Incumbent	Status	Party	Candidate	Votes	%
2	Republican	Brian Boner	Won	Republican	Brian Boner	8,187	85.60%
2	Republican	Brian Boner	Won	Democratic	William B. Cullen III	1,377	14.40%
4	Republican	Tony Ross	Retired	Republican	Tara Nethercott	5,867	60.32%
4	Republican	Tony Ross	Retired	Democratic	Ken Esquibel	3,859	39.68%
6	Republican	Wayne Johnson	Retired	Republican	Anthony Bouchard	4,670	51.98%
6	Republican	Wayne Johnson	Retired	Independent	Kym Zwonitzer	4,314	48.02%
8	Democratic	Floyd A. Esquibel	Defeated	Republican	Affie Ellis	3,638	60.80%
8	Democratic	Floyd A. Esquibel	Defeated	Democratic	Floyd A. Esquibel	2,346	39.20%
10	Republican	Phil Nicholas	Retired	Republican	Glenn Moniz	5,133	57.36%
10	Republican	Phil Nicholas	Retired	Democratic	Narina Nunez	3,815	42.64%
12	Democratic	Bernadine Craft	Retired	Democratic	Liisa Anselmi-Dalton	4,660	100.00%
14	Republican	Stan Cooper	Retired	Republican	Fred Baldwin	6,939	84.87%
14	Republican	Stan Cooper	Retired	Democratic	Charlotte Sedey	1,237	15.13%
16	Republican	Dan Dockstader	Won	Republican	Dan Dockstader	7,208	78.37%
16	Republican	Dan Dockstader	Won	Democratic	Richard Kusaba	1,989	21.63%
18	Republican	Hank Coe	Won	Republican	Hank Coe	5,682	57.17%
18	Republican	Hank Coe	Won	Independent	Cindy Baldwin	4,256	42.83%
20	Republican	Gerald Geis	Retired	Republican	Wyatt Agar	6,893	81.68%
20	Republican	Gerald Geis	Retired	Democratic	Mary Jane Norskog	1,546	18.32%
22	Republican	Dave Kinskey	Won	Republican	Dave Kinskey	7,603	100.00%
24	Republican	Michael Von Flatern	Won	Republican	Michael Von Flatern	6,553	100.00%
26	Republican	Eli D. Bebout	Won	Republican	Eli D. Bebout	6,461	76.55%
26	Republican	Eli D. Bebout	Won	Democratic	Chesie Lee	1,979	23.45%
28	Republican	James Anderson	Won	Republican	James Anderson	5,216	71.19%
28	Republican	James Anderson	Won	Democratic	Kimberly Holloway	2,111	28.81%
30	Republican	Charles Scott	Won	Republican	Charles Scott	5,831	79.31%
30	Republican	Charles Scott	Won	Democratic	Robert Ford	1,521	20.69%

=== House of Representatives ===
District	Party	Incumbent	Status	Party	Candidate	Votes	%
1	Republican	Tyler Lindholm	Won	Republican	Tyler Lindholm	4,606	90.03%
1	Republican	Tyler Lindholm	Won	Democratic	Randy Leinen	510	9.97%
2	Republican	Hans Hunt	Won	Republican	Hans Hunt	3,863	86.09%
2	Republican	Hans Hunt	Won	Democratic	Harold Eaton	624	13.91%
3	Republican	Eric Barlow	Won	Republican	Eric Barlow	3,822	100.00%
4	Republican	Dan Kirkbride	Won	Republican	Dan Kirkbride	3,652	75.50%
4	Republican	Dan Kirkbride	Won	Constitution	Joe Michaels	1,185	24.50%
5	Republican	Cheri Steinmetz	Won	Republican	Cheri Steinmetz	3,798	100.00%
6	Republican	Richard Cannady	Retired	Republican	Aaron Clausen	3,996	87.61%
6	Republican	Richard Cannady	Retired	Democratic	Shalyn C. Anderson	565	12.39%
7	Republican	Sue Wilson	Won	Republican	Sue Wilson	4,782	100.00%
8	Republican	Bob Nicholas	Won	Republican	Bob Nicholas	2,570	56.97%
8	Republican	Bob Nicholas	Won	Democratic	Linda Burt	1,941	43.03%
9	Republican	David Zwonitzer	Retired	Republican	Landon Brown	2,299	58.38%
9	Republican	David Zwonitzer	Retired	Democratic	Mike Weiland	1,639	41.62%
10	Republican	John Eklund	Won	Republican	John Eklund	4,187	83.19%
10	Republican	John Eklund	Won	Democratic	Matthew Porras	846	16.81%
11	Democratic	Mary Throne	Defeated	Republican	Jared Olsen	1,549	51.02%
11	Democratic	Mary Throne	Defeated	Democratic	Mary Throne	1,487	48.98%
12	Republican	Lars Lone	Won	Republican	Lars Lone	1,756	53.62%
12	Republican	Lars Lone	Won	Democratic	Lee Filer	1,519	46.38%
13	Democratic	Cathy Connolly	Won	Democratic	Cathy Connolly	2,252	59.01%
13	Democratic	Cathy Connolly	Won	Republican	Joey Correnti IV	1,564	40.99%
14	Republican	Kermit Brown	Retired	Republican	Dan Furphy	2,216	59.81%
14	Republican	Kermit Brown	Retired	Democratic	Erin O'Doherty	1,489	40.19%
15	Republican	Donald Burkhart	Won	Republican	Donald Burkhart	2,086	66.94%
15	Republican	Donald Burkhart	Won	Democratic	DeBari Martinez	1,030	33.06%
16	Republican	Ruth Petroff	Retired	Democratic	Mike Gierau	3,740	100.00%
17	Democratic	JoAnn Dayton	Won	Democratic	JoAnn Dayton	2,177	100.00%
18	Republican	Fred Baldwin	Retired	Republican	Thomas Crank	3,595	80.34%
18	Republican	Fred Baldwin	Retired	Democratic	Michele Irwin	880	19.66%
19	Republican	Allen Jaggi	Retired	Republican	Danny Eyre	3,286	84.73%
19	Republican	Allen Jaggi	Retired	Democratic	Mel McCreary	592	15.27%
20	Republican	Albert Sommers	Won	Republican	Albert Sommers	3,268	86.64%
20	Republican	Albert Sommers	Won	Democratic	Jeanne Brown	504	13.36%
21	Republican	Robert McKim	Won	Republican	Robert McKim	3,832	91.76%
21	Republican	Robert McKim	Won	Democratic	David Fogle	344	8.24%
22	Republican	Marti Halverson	Won	Republican	Marti Halverson	2,942	57.70%
22	Republican	Marti Halverson	Won	Democratic	Marylee White	2,157	42.30%
23	Democratic	Andy Schwartz	Won	Democratic	Andy Schwartz	4,199	100.00%
24	Republican	Sam Krone	Defeated in primary	Republican	Scott Court	2,254	46.27%
24	Republican	Sam Krone	Defeated in primary	Independent	Sandy Newsome	1,421	29.17%
24	Republican	Sam Krone	Defeated in primary	Democratic	Paul Fees	1,196	24.55%
25	Republican	Dan Laursen	Won	Republican	Dan Laursen	3,135	78.93%
25	Republican	Dan Laursen	Won	Democratic	Shane Tillotson	837	21.07%
26	Republican	Elaine Harvey	Retired	Republican	Jamie Flitner	2,665	65.80%
26	Republican	Elaine Harvey	Retired	Constitution	Joyce Collins	1,001	24.72%
26	Republican	Elaine Harvey	Retired	Democratic	Jean Petty	384	9.48%
27	Republican	Mike Greear	Won	Republican	Mike Greear	3,304	85.40%
27	Republican	Mike Greear	Won	Democratic	Robert D. McDonough, Jr.	565	14.60%
28	Republican	Nathan Winters	Won	Republican	Nathan Winters	3,510	78.17%
28	Republican	Nathan Winters	Won	Democratic	Howard Samelson	980	21.83%
29	Republican	Mark Kinner	Won	Republican	Mark Kinner	3,073	77.58%
29	Republican	Mark Kinner	Won	Democratic	Sandra S. Kingsley	888	22.42%
30	Republican	Mark Jennings	Won	Republican	Mark Jennings	2,953	67.81%
30	Republican	Mark Jennings	Won	Democratic	Val Burgess	1,402	32.19%
31	Republican	Scott Clem	Won	Republican	Scott Clem	3,315	88.49%
31	Republican	Scott Clem	Won	Democratic	Dylan Czarnecki	431	11.51%
32	Republican	Norine Kasperik	Retired	Republican	Timothy Hallinan	3,713	100.00%
33	Republican	Jim Allen	Won	Republican	Jim Allen	1,534	51.12%
33	Republican	Jim Allen	Won	Democratic	Sergio Maldonado	1,467	48.88%
34	Republican	Rita Campbell	Retired	Republican	Tim Salazar	3,890	100.00%
35	Republican	Kendell Kroeker	Won	Republican	Kendell Kroeker	3,879	75.10%
35	Republican	Kendell Kroeker	Won	Democratic	Brett Governanti	1,286	24.90%
36	Republican	Gerald Gay	Defeated	Democratic	Debbie Bovee	1,910	52.94%
36	Republican	Gerald Gay	Defeated	Republican	Gerald Gay	1,698	47.06%
37	Republican	Steve Harshman	Won	Republican	Steve Harshman	3,885	79.94%
37	Republican	Steve Harshman	Won	Democratic	Deirdre Stoelzle	975	20.06%
38	Republican	Tom Walters	Won	Republican	Tom Walters	3,528	100.00%
39	Democratic	Stan Blake	Won	Democratic	Stan Blake	2,628	100.00%
40	Republican	Mike Madden	Won	Republican	Mike Madden	3,534	80.91%
40	Republican	Mike Madden	Won	Democratic	Greg Haas	834	19.09%
41	Democratic	Ken Esquibel	Retired	Republican	Bill Henderson	1,976	50.81%
41	Democratic	Ken Esquibel	Retired	Democratic	Amy Simpson	1,913	49.19%
42	Republican	Jim Blackburn	Won	Republican	Jim Blackburn	2,775	68.27%
42	Republican	Jim Blackburn	Won	Democratic	Juliet Daniels	1,290	31.73%
43	Republican	Dan Zwonitzer	Won	Republican	Dan Zwonitzer	2,620	100.00%
44	Democratic	James W. Byrd	Won	Democratic	James W. Byrd	1,412	53.93%
44	Democratic	James W. Byrd	Won	Republican	John Romero-Martinez	1,206	46.07%
45	Democratic	Charles Pelkey	Won	Democratic	Charles Pelkey	1,894	52.29%
45	Democratic	Charles Pelkey	Won	Republican	Tom Schmit	1,728	47.71%
46	Republican	Glenn Moniz	Retired	Republican	Bill Haley	2,935	58.45%
46	Republican	Glenn Moniz	Retired	Democratic	Ken Chestek	2,086	41.55%
47	Republican	Jerry Paxton	Won	Republican	Jerry Paxton	3,309	84.39%
47	Republican	Jerry Paxton	Won	Democratic	Ken Casner	612	15.61%
48	Republican	Mark Baker	Won	Republican	Mark Baker	1,957	58.40%
48	Republican	Mark Baker	Won	Democratic	Jackie Freeze	1,394	41.60%
49	Republican	Garry Piiparinen	Won	Republican	Garry Piiparinen	2,747	76.82%
49	Republican	Garry Piiparinen	Won	Democratic	Larissa Sneider	829	23.18%
50	Republican	David Northrup	Won	Republican	David Northrup	4,077	82.26%
50	Republican	David Northrup	Won	Democratic	Mike Specht	879	17.74%
51	Republican	Rosie Berger	Defeated in primary	Republican	Bo Biteman	3,931	69.15%
51	Republican	Rosie Berger	Defeated in primary	Democratic	Hollis Hackman	1,754	30.85%
52	Republican	William Pownall	Won	Republican	William Pownall	2,696	80.99%
52	Republican	William Pownall	Won	Democratic	Duffy Jenniges	633	19.01%
53	Republican	Roy Edwards	Won	Republican	Roy Edwards	2,437	100.00%
54	Republican	Lloyd Larsen	Won	Republican	Lloyd Larsen	2,780	56.73%
54	Republican	Lloyd Larsen	Won	Democratic	Julia Stuble	2,120	43.27%
55	Republican	David Miller	Won	Republican	David Miller	3,384	100.00%
56	Republican	Tim Stubson	Retired	Republican	Jerry Obermueller	2,243	59.73%
56	Republican	Tim Stubson	Retired	Democratic	Dan Neal	1,512	40.27%
57	Republican	Thomas Lockhart	Retired	Republican	Chuck Gray	2,261	64.36%
57	Republican	Thomas Lockhart	Retired	Democratic	Audrey Cotherman	1,252	35.64%
58	Republican	Tom Reeder	Defeated in primary	Republican	Patrick Sweeney	2,407	76.68%
58	Republican	Tom Reeder	Defeated in primary	Democratic	Michael McDaniel	482	15.36%
58	Republican	Tom Reeder	Defeated in primary	Independent	Joe Porambo	250	7.96%
59	Republican	Bunky Loucks	Won	Republican	Bunky Loucks	2,462	69.47%
59	Republican	Bunky Loucks	Won	Democratic	Laurie Longtine	1,082	30.53%
60	Democratic	John Freeman	Won	Democratic	John Freeman	3,088	100.00%

Source: Wyoming Secretary of State, Ballotpedia
