= 2016 Wyoming House of Representatives election =

- November 8, 2016

All 60 seats in the Wyoming House of Representatives 31 seats needed for a majority

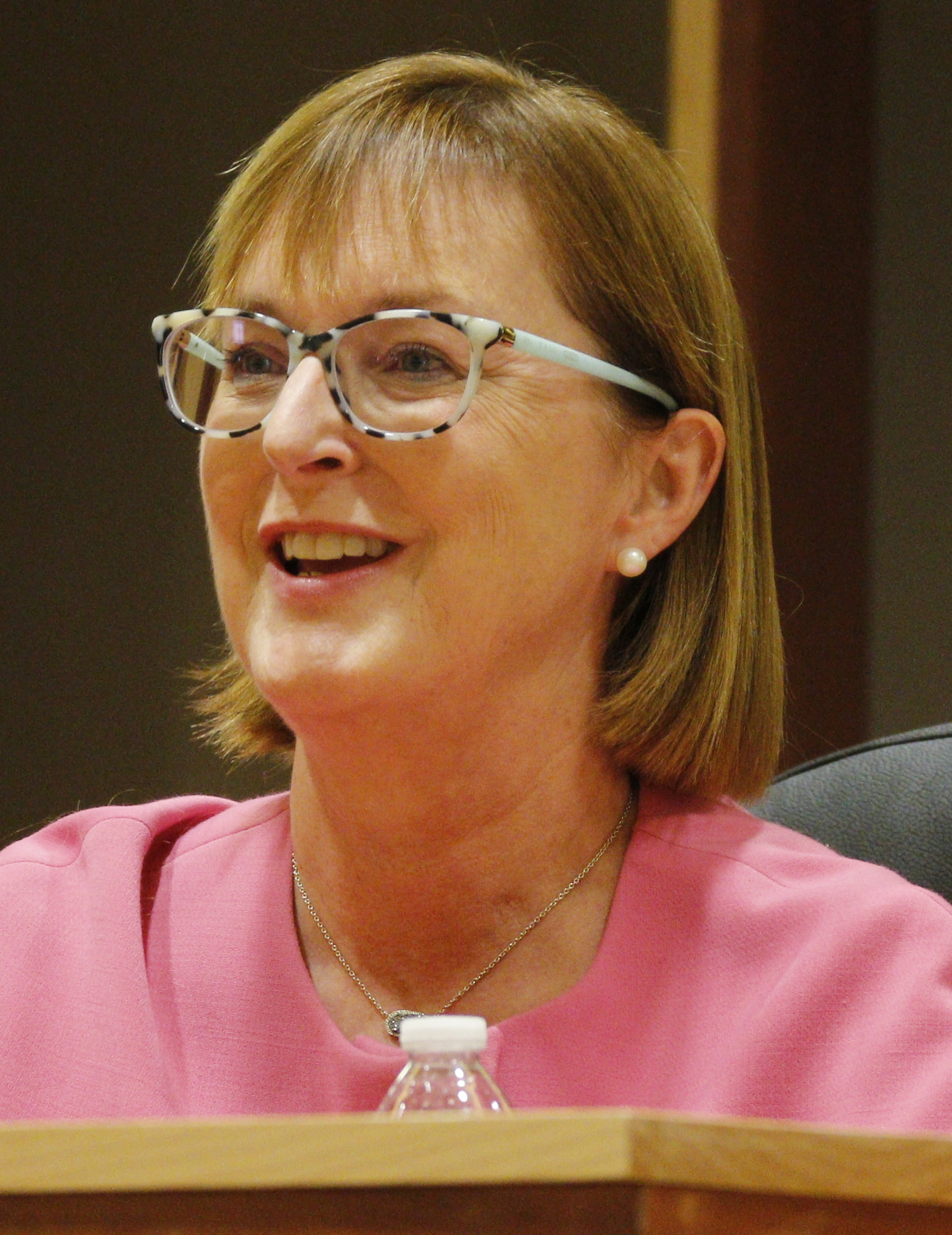
| | Majority party | Minority party |
|---|---|---|
| Leader | Kermit Brown | Mary Throne |
| Party | Republican | Democratic |
| Leader since | January 13, 2015 | January 7, 2013 |
| Leader's seat | 14th | 11th |
| Seats before | 51 | 9 |
| Seats won | 51 | 9 |
| Seat change | Steady | Steady |
| Popular vote | 164,140 | 68,510 |
| Percentage | 68.8% | 28.7% |
- Results: Democratic hold Democratic gain Republican hold Republican gain
Speaker before election
Kermit Brown
Republican
Elected Speaker
Steve Harshman
Republican

All 60 seats in the Wyoming House of Representatives were up for election on November 8, 2016, as part of the 2016 Wyoming elections. Primary elections were held on August 16. This would be the last state house election in which Democrats won over 20% collectively.

== Election summary ==
Summary of the November 8, 2016 Wyoming House election results
| Party | Candidates | Votes | % | Seats | | |
| Party | Candidates | Votes | % | Before | Won | +/– |
|---|---|---|---|---|---|---|
| Republican | 55 | 164,140 | 68.8 | 51 | 51 | Steady |
| Democratic | 50 | 68,510 | 28.7 | 9 | 9 | Steady |
| Constitution | 2 | 2,186 | 0.9 | 0 | 0 | Steady |
| Independent | 2 | 1,671 | 0.7 | 0 | 0 | Steady |
| Write-in | | 1,957 | 0.8 | | | |
| Total | | 238,464 | 100% | 60 | | |

Popular vote
| Republican | 68.8% |
| Democratic | 28.7% |
| Constitution | 0.9% |
| Write-in | 0.8% |
| Independent | 0.7% |

House seats
| Republican | 85.0% |
| Democratic | 15.0% |

== Predictions ==
| Source | Ranking | As of |
|---|---|---|
| Governing | Safe R | October 12, 2016 |

== Detailed results by State House district ==
=== District 1 ===
2016 Wyoming House of Representatives election, District 1
| Party | Candidate | Votes | % |
|---|---|---|---|
| Republican | Tyler Lindholm (incumbent) | 4,606 | 89.8 |
| Democratic | Randy Leinen | 510 | 10.0 |
| Write-in | | 12 | 0.2 |
| Total votes | | 5,128 | 100.0 |
| Republican hold | | | |

=== District 2 ===
2016 Wyoming House of Representatives election, District 2
| Party | Candidate | Votes | % |
|---|---|---|---|
| Republican | Hans Hunt (incumbent) | 3,863 | 85.8 |
| Democratic | Harold Eaton | 624 | 13.9 |
| Write-in | | 13 | 0.3 |
| Total votes | | 4,500 | 100.0 |
| Republican hold | | | |

=== District 3 ===
2016 Wyoming House of Representatives election, District 3
| Party | Candidate | Votes | % |
|---|---|---|---|
| Republican | Eric Barlow (incumbent) | 3,822 | 98.5 |
| Write-in | | 60 | 1.5 |
| Total votes | | 3,882 | 100.0 |
| Republican hold | | | |

=== District 4 ===
2016 Wyoming House of Representatives election, District 4
| Party | Candidate | Votes | % |
|---|---|---|---|
| Republican | Dan Kirkbride (incumbent) | 3,652 | 74.9 |
| Constitution | Harold Eaton | 1,185 | 24.3 |
| Write-in | | 38 | 0.8 |
| Total votes | | 4,875 | 100.0 |
| Republican hold | | | |

=== District 5 ===
2016 Wyoming House of Representatives election, District 5
| Party | Candidate | Votes | % |
|---|---|---|---|
| Republican | Cheri Steinmetz (incumbent) | 3,798 | 98.2 |
| Write-in | | 71 | 1.8 |
| Total votes | | 4,875 | 100.0 |
| Republican hold | | | |

=== District 6 ===
2016 Wyoming House of Representatives election, District 6
| Party | Candidate | Votes | % |
|---|---|---|---|
| Republican | Aaron Clausen | 3,996 | 87.4 |
| Democratic | Shalyn C. Anderson | 565 | 12.4 |
| Write-in | | 10 | 0.2 |
| Total votes | | 4,571 | 100.0 |
| Republican hold | | | |

=== District 7 ===
2016 Wyoming House of Representatives election, District 7
| Party | Candidate | Votes | % |
|---|---|---|---|
| Republican | Sue Wilson (incumbent) | 4,782 | 98.5 |
| Write-in | | 73 | 1.5 |
| Total votes | | 4,855 | 100.0 |
| Republican hold | | | |

=== District 8 ===
2016 Wyoming House of Representatives election, District 8
| Party | Candidate | Votes | % |
|---|---|---|---|
| Republican | Bob Nicholas (incumbent) | 2,570 | 56.8 |
| Democratic | Linda Burt | 1,941 | 42.9 |
| Write-in | | 11 | 0.2 |
| Total votes | | 4,522 | 100.0 |
| Republican hold | | | |

=== District 9 ===
2016 Wyoming House of Representatives election, District 9
| Party | Candidate | Votes | % |
|---|---|---|---|
| Republican | Landon Brown | 2,299 | 58.3 |
| Democratic | Mike Weiland | 1,639 | 41.6 |
| Write-in | | 3 | 0.1 |
| Total votes | | 3,941 | 100.0 |
| Republican hold | | | |

=== District 10 ===
2016 Wyoming House of Representatives election, District 10
| Party | Candidate | Votes | % |
|---|---|---|---|
| Republican | John Eklund (incumbent) | 4,187 | 82.5 |
| Democratic | Gaylan D. Wright, Sr. | 846 | 16.7 |
| Write-in | | 21 | 0.4 |
| Total votes | | 5,054 | 100.0 |
| Republican hold | | | |

=== District 11 ===
2016 Wyoming House of Representatives election, District 11
| Party | Candidate | Votes | % |
|---|---|---|---|
| Republican | Jared Olsen | 1,549 | 50.9 |
| Democratic | Mary Throne (incumbent) | 1,487 | 48.9 |
| Write-in | | 5 | 0.2 |
| Total votes | | 3,041 | 100.0 |
| Republican gain from Democratic | | | |

=== District 12 ===
2016 Wyoming House of Representatives election, District 12
| Party | Candidate | Votes | % |
|---|---|---|---|
| Republican | Lars Lone | 1,756 | 53.4 |
| Democratic | Lee Filler | 1,519 | 46.2 |
| Write-in | | 12 | 0.4 |
| Total votes | | 3,287 | 100.0 |
| Republican hold | | | |

=== District 13 ===
2016 Wyoming House of Representatives election, District 13
| Party | Candidate | Votes | % |
|---|---|---|---|
| Democratic | Cathy Connolly (incumbent) | 2,252 | 58.7 |
| Republican | Joey Correnti | 1,564 | 40.8 |
| Write-in | | 20 | 0.5 |
| Total votes | | 3,836 | 100.0 |
| Democratic hold | | | |

=== District 14 ===
2016 Wyoming House of Representatives election, District 14
| Party | Candidate | Votes | % |
|---|---|---|---|
| Republican | Dan Furphy | 2,216 | 59.7 |
| Democratic | Erin O'Doherty | 1,489 | 40.1 |
| Write-in | | 5 | 0.2 |
| Total votes | | 3,710 | 100.0 |
| Republican hold | | | |

=== District 15 ===
2016 Wyoming House of Representatives election, District 15
| Party | Candidate | Votes | % |
|---|---|---|---|
| Republican | Donald Burkhart (incumbent) | 2,086 | 66.5 |
| Democratic | Erin O'Doherty | 1,030 | 32.9 |
| Write-in | | 11 | 0.6 |
| Total votes | | 3,710 | 100.0 |
| Republican hold | | | |

=== District 16 ===
2016 Wyoming House of Representatives election, District 16
| Party | Candidate | Votes | % |
|---|---|---|---|
| Democratic | Mike Gierau (incumbent) | 3,740 | 97.4 |
| Write-in | | 100 | 2.6 |
| Total votes | | 3,840 | 100.0 |
| Democratic gain from Republican | | | |

=== District 17 ===
2016 Wyoming House of Representatives election, District 17
| Party | Candidate | Votes | % |
|---|---|---|---|
| Democratic | JoAnn Dayton (incumbent) | 2,177 | 95.9 |
| Write-in | | 93 | 4.1 |
| Total votes | | 2,270 | 100.0 |
| Democratic hold | | | |

=== District 18 ===
2016 Wyoming House of Representatives election, District 18
| Party | Candidate | Votes | % |
|---|---|---|---|
| Republican | Thomas Crank | 3,595 | 80.2 |
| Democratic | Michele Irwin | 880 | 19.6 |
| Write-in | | 9 | 0.2 |
| Total votes | | 4,484 | 100.0 |
| Republican hold | | | |

=== District 19 ===
2016 Wyoming House of Representatives election, District 19
| Party | Candidate | Votes | % |
|---|---|---|---|
| Republican | Danny Eyre | 3,286 | 84.5 |
| Democratic | Mel McCreary | 592 | 15.2 |
| Write-in | | 10 | 0.3 |
| Total votes | | 3,888 | 100.0 |
| Republican hold | | | |

=== District 20 ===
2016 Wyoming House of Representatives election, District 20
| Party | Candidate | Votes | % |
|---|---|---|---|
| Republican | Albert Sommers (incumbent) | 3,268 | 86.4 |
| Democratic | Jeanne Brown | 504 | 13.3 |
| Write-in | | 10 | 0.3 |
| Total votes | | 3,782 | 100.0 |
| Republican hold | | | |

=== District 21 ===
2016 Wyoming House of Representatives election, District 21
| Party | Candidate | Votes | % |
|---|---|---|---|
| Republican | Robert McKim (incumbent) | 3,832 | 91.4 |
| Democratic | David Fogle | 344 | 8.2 |
| Write-in | | 18 | 0.4 |
| Total votes | | 4,194 | 100.0 |
| Republican hold | | | |

=== District 22 ===
2016 Wyoming House of Representatives election, District 22
| Party | Candidate | Votes | % |
|---|---|---|---|
| Republican | Marti Halverson (incumbent) | 2,942 | 57.5 |
| Democratic | Marylee White | 2,157 | 42.2 |
| Write-in | | 16 | 0.3 |
| Total votes | | 5,115 | 100.0 |
| Republican hold | | | |

=== District 23 ===
2016 Wyoming House of Representatives election, District 23
| Party | Candidate | Votes | % |
|---|---|---|---|
| Democratic | Andy Schwartz (incumbent) | 4,199 | 95.6 |
| Write-in | | 193 | 4.4 |
| Total votes | | 4,392 | 100.0 |
| Democratic hold | | | |

=== District 24 ===
2016 Wyoming House of Representatives election, District 24
| Party | Candidate | Votes | % |
|---|---|---|---|
| Republican | Scott Court | 2,254 | 46.1 |
| Independent | Sandy Newsome | 1,421 | 29.1 |
| Democratic | Paul Fees | 1,196 | 24.5 |
| Write-in | | 14 | 0.3 |
| Total votes | | 4,885 | 100.0 |
| Republican hold | | | |

=== District 25 ===
2016 Wyoming House of Representatives election, District 25
| Party | Candidate | Votes | % |
|---|---|---|---|
| Republican | Dan Laursen (incumbent) | 3,135 | 78.6 |
| Democratic | Shane Tillotson | 837 | 21.0 |
| Write-in | | 19 | 0.4 |
| Total votes | | 3,991 | 100.0 |
| Republican hold | | | |

=== District 26 ===
2016 Wyoming House of Representatives election, District 26
| Party | Candidate | Votes | % |
|---|---|---|---|
| Republican | Jamie Flitner | 2,665 | 65.8 |
| Constitution | Joyce Collins | 1,001 | 24.7 |
| Democratic | Jean Petty | 384 | 9.4 |
| Write-in | | 6 | 0.1 |
| Total votes | | 4,050 | 100.0 |
| Republican hold | | | |

=== District 27 ===
2016 Wyoming House of Representatives election, District 27
| Party | Candidate | Votes | % |
|---|---|---|---|
| Republican | Mike Greear (incumbent) | 3,304 | 85.1 |
| Democratic | Robert McDonough, Jr. | 565 | 14.6 |
| Write-in | | 15 | 0.3 |
| Total votes | | 4,050 | 100.0 |
| Republican hold | | | |

=== District 28 ===
2016 Wyoming House of Representatives election, District 28
| Party | Candidate | Votes | % |
|---|---|---|---|
| Republican | Nathan Winters (incumbent) | 3,510 | 78.0 |
| Democratic | Howard Samelson | 980 | 21.8 |
| Write-in | | 9 | 0.2 |
| Total votes | | 4,050 | 100.0 |
| Republican hold | | | |

=== District 29 ===
2016 Wyoming House of Representatives election, District 29
| Party | Candidate | Votes | % |
|---|---|---|---|
| Republican | Mark Kinner (incumbent) | 3,073 | 77.3 |
| Democratic | Sandra Kingsley | 888 | 22.4 |
| Write-in | | 13 | 0.3 |
| Total votes | | 3,974 | 100.0 |
| Republican hold | | | |

=== District 30 ===
2016 Wyoming House of Representatives election, District 30
| Party | Candidate | Votes | % |
|---|---|---|---|
| Republican | Mark Jennings (incumbent) | 2,953 | 67.7 |
| Democratic | Val Burgess | 1,402 | 32.1 |
| Write-in | | 9 | 0.2 |
| Total votes | | 4,364 | 100.0 |
| Republican hold | | | |

=== District 31 ===
2016 Wyoming House of Representatives election, District 31
| Party | Candidate | Votes | % |
|---|---|---|---|
| Republican | Scott Clem (incumbent) | 3,315 | 88.2 |
| Democratic | Val Burgess | 431 | 11.5 |
| Write-in | | 12 | 0.3 |
| Total votes | | 3,758 | 100.0 |
| Republican hold | | | |

=== District 32 ===
2016 Wyoming House of Representatives election, District 32
| Party | Candidate | Votes | % |
|---|---|---|---|
| Republican | Timothy Hallinan (incumbent) | 3,713 | 98.5 |
| Write-in | | 51 | 1.5 |
| Total votes | | 3,764 | 100.0 |
| Republican hold | | | |

=== District 33 ===
2016 Wyoming House of Representatives election, District 33
| Party | Candidate | Votes | % |
|---|---|---|---|
| Republican | Jim Allen (incumbent) | 1,534 | 51.0 |
| Democratic | Sergio Maldonado | 1,467 | 48.8 |
| Write-in | | 7 | 0.2 |
| Total votes | | 3,008 | 100.0 |
| Republican hold | | | |

=== District 34 ===
2016 Wyoming House of Representatives election, District 34
| Party | Candidate | Votes | % |
|---|---|---|---|
| Republican | Tim Salazar (incumbent) | 3,890 | 98.7 |
| Write-in | | 53 | 1.3 |
| Total votes | | 3,943 | 100.0 |
| Republican hold | | | |

=== District 35 ===
2016 Wyoming House of Representatives election, District 35
| Party | Candidate | Votes | % |
|---|---|---|---|
| Republican | Kendell Kroeker (incumbent) | 3,879 | 74.8 |
| Democratic | Brett Governanti | 1,286 | 24.8 |
| Write-in | | 20 | 0.4 |
| Total votes | | 5,185 | 100.0 |
| Republican hold | | | |

=== District 36 ===
2016 Wyoming House of Representatives election, District 36
| Party | Candidate | Votes | % |
|---|---|---|---|
| Democratic | Debbie Bovee | 1,910 | 52.7 |
| Republican | Gerald Gay (incumbent) | 1,698 | 46.8 |
| Write-in | | 20 | 0.5 |
| Total votes | | 3,628 | 100.0 |
| Democratic gain from Republican | | | |

=== District 37 ===
2016 Wyoming House of Representatives election, District 37
| Party | Candidate | Votes | % |
|---|---|---|---|
| Republican | Steve Harshman (incumbent) | 3,885 | 79.4 |
| Democratic | Deirdre Stoelzle | 975 | 19.9 |
| Write-in | | 34 | 0.3 |
| Total votes | | 4,894 | 100.0 |
| Republican hold | | | |

=== District 38 ===
2016 Wyoming House of Representatives election, District 38
| Party | Candidate | Votes | % |
|---|---|---|---|
| Republican | Tom Walters (incumbent) | 3,528 | 97.6 |
| Write-in | | 80 | 2.4 |
| Total votes | | 3,338 | 100.0 |
| Republican hold | | | |

=== District 39 ===
2016 Wyoming House of Representatives election, District 39
| Party | Candidate | Votes | % |
|---|---|---|---|
| Democratic | Stan Blake (incumbent) | 2,628 | 95.3 |
| Write-in | | 131 | 4.7 |
| Total votes | | 2,759 | 100.0 |
| Democratic hold | | | |

=== District 40 ===
2016 Wyoming House of Representatives election, District 40
| Party | Candidate | Votes | % |
|---|---|---|---|
| Republican | Michael Madden (incumbent) | 3,534 | 80.1 |
| Democratic | Greg Haas | 834 | 18.9 |
| Write-in | | 46 | 1.0 |
| Total votes | | 4,414 | 100.0 |
| Republican hold | | | |

=== District 41 ===
2016 Wyoming House of Representatives election, District 41
| Party | Candidate | Votes | % |
|---|---|---|---|
| Republican | Bill Henderson | 1,976 | 50.7 |
| Democratic | Amy Simpson | 1,913 | 49.0 |
| Write-in | | 11 | 0.3 |
| Total votes | | 3,900 | 100.0 |
| Republican gain from Democratic | | | |

=== District 42 ===
2016 Wyoming House of Representatives election, District 42
| Party | Candidate | Votes | % |
|---|---|---|---|
| Republican | Jim Blackburn (incumbent) | 2,775 | 68.1 |
| Democratic | Juliet Daniels | 1,290 | 31.7 |
| Write-in | | 10 | 0.2 |
| Total votes | | 4,075 | 100.0 |
| Republican hold | | | |

=== District 43 ===
2016 Wyoming House of Representatives election, District 43
| Party | Candidate | Votes | % |
|---|---|---|---|
| Republican | Dan Zwonitzer (incumbent) | 2,620 | 97.2 |
| Write-in | | 75 | 2.8 |
| Total votes | | 2,695 | 100.0 |
| Republican hold | | | |

=== District 44 ===
2016 Wyoming House of Representatives election, District 44
| Party | Candidate | Votes | % |
|---|---|---|---|
| Democratic | James W. Byrd (incumbent) | 1,412 | 53.8 |
| Republican | John Romero-Martinez | 1,206 | 45.9 |
| Write-in | | 9 | 0.3 |
| Total votes | | 2,627 | 100.0 |
| Democratic hold | | | |

=== District 45 ===
2016 Wyoming House of Representatives election, District 45
| Party | Candidate | Votes | % |
|---|---|---|---|
| Democratic | Charles Pelkey (incumbent) | 1,894 | 52.2 |
| Republican | Tom Schmit | 1,728 | 47.6 |
| Write-in | | 8 | 0.2 |
| Total votes | | 3,630 | 100.0 |
| Democratic hold | | | |

=== District 46 ===
2016 Wyoming House of Representatives election, District 46
| Party | Candidate | Votes | % |
|---|---|---|---|
| Republican | Bill Haley | 2,935 | 58.4 |
| Democratic | Ken Chestek | 2,086 | 41.5 |
| Write-in | | 7 | 0.1 |
| Total votes | | 5,028 | 100.0 |
| Republican hold | | | |

=== District 47 ===
2016 Wyoming House of Representatives election, District 47
| Party | Candidate | Votes | % |
|---|---|---|---|
| Republican | Jerry Paxton (incumbent) | 3,309 | 83.9 |
| Democratic | Ken Casner | 612 | 15.5 |
| Write-in | | 21 | 0.6 |
| Total votes | | 3,942 | 100.0 |
| Republican hold | | | |

=== District 48 ===
2016 Wyoming House of Representatives election, District 48
| Party | Candidate | Votes | % |
|---|---|---|---|
| Republican | Mark Baker (incumbent) | 1,957 | 58.3 |
| Democratic | Jackie Freeze | 1,394 | 41.5 |
| Write-in | | 6 | 0.2 |
| Total votes | | 3,357 | 100.0 |
| Republican hold | | | |

=== District 49 ===
2016 Wyoming House of Representatives election, District 49
| Party | Candidate | Votes | % |
|---|---|---|---|
| Republican | Garry Piiparinen (incumbent) | 2,747 | 76.3 |
| Democratic | Jackie Freeze | 829 | 23.0 |
| Write-in | | 25 | 0.7 |
| Total votes | | 3,601 | 100.0 |
| Republican hold | | | |

=== District 50 ===
2016 Wyoming House of Representatives election, District 50
| Party | Candidate | Votes | % |
|---|---|---|---|
| Republican | David Northrup (incumbent) | 4,077 | 81.7 |
| Democratic | Mike Specht | 879 | 17.6 |
| Write-in | | 29 | 0.7 |
| Total votes | | 4,985 | 100.0 |
| Republican hold | | | |

=== District 51 ===
2016 Wyoming House of Representatives election, District 51
| Party | Candidate | Votes | % |
|---|---|---|---|
| Republican | Bo Biteman | 3,931 | 68.6 |
| Democratic | Hollis Hackman | 1,754 | 30.6 |
| Write-in | | 46 | 0.8 |
| Total votes | | 5,731 | 100.0 |
| Republican hold | | | |

=== District 52 ===
2016 Wyoming House of Representatives election, District 52
| Party | Candidate | Votes | % |
|---|---|---|---|
| Republican | William Pownall (incumbent) | 2,696 | 79.8 |
| Democratic | Duffy Jenniges | 633 | 18.7 |
| Write-in | | 49 | 1.5 |
| Total votes | | 3,378 | 100.0 |
| Republican hold | | | |

=== District 53 ===
2016 Wyoming House of Representatives election, District 53
| Party | Candidate | Votes | % |
|---|---|---|---|
| Republican | Roy Edwards (incumbent) | 2,437 | 98.4 |
| Write-in | | 41 | 1.6 |
| Total votes | | 2,478 | 100.0 |
| Republican hold | | | |

=== District 54 ===
2016 Wyoming House of Representatives election, District 54
| Party | Candidate | Votes | % |
|---|---|---|---|
| Republican | Lloyd Larsen (incumbent) | 2,780 | 56.6 |
| Democratic | Julia Stuble | 2,120 | 43.2 |
| Write-in | | 11 | 0.2 |
| Total votes | | 4,911 | 100.0 |
| Republican hold | | | |

=== District 55 ===
2016 Wyoming House of Representatives election, District 55
| Party | Candidate | Votes | % |
|---|---|---|---|
| Republican | David Miller (incumbent) | 3,384 | 97.8 |
| Write-in | | 76 | 2.2 |
| Total votes | | 3,460 | 100.0 |
| Republican hold | | | |

=== District 56 ===
2016 Wyoming House of Representatives election, District 56
| Party | Candidate | Votes | % |
|---|---|---|---|
| Republican | Jerry Obermueller | 2,243 | 59.7 |
| Democratic | Dan Neal | 1,512 | 40.2 |
| Write-in | | 5 | 0.1 |
| Total votes | | 3,760 | 100.0 |
| Republican hold | | | |

=== District 57 ===
2016 Wyoming House of Representatives election, District 57
| Party | Candidate | Votes | % |
|---|---|---|---|
| Republican | Chuck Gray | 2,261 | 64.0 |
| Democratic | Julia Stuble | 1,252 | 35.4 |
| Write-in | | 20 | 0.6 |
| Total votes | | 3,533 | 100.0 |
| Republican hold | | | |

=== District 58 ===
2016 Wyoming House of Representatives election, District 58
| Party | Candidate | Votes | % |
|---|---|---|---|
| Republican | Pat Sweeney | 2,407 | 76.2 |
| Democratic | Michael McDaniel | 482 | 15.3 |
| Independent | Joe Parambo | 250 | 7.9 |
| Write-in | | 19 | 0.6 |
| Total votes | | 3,158 | 100.0 |
| Republican hold | | | |

=== District 59 ===
2016 Wyoming House of Representatives election, District 59
| Party | Candidate | Votes | % |
|---|---|---|---|
| Republican | Bunky Loucks (incumbent) | 2,462 | 69.1 |
| Democratic | Laurie Longtine | 1,082 | 30.4 |
| Write-in | | 20 | 0.5 |
| Total votes | | 3,564 | 100.0 |
| Republican hold | | | |

=== District 60 ===
2016 Wyoming House of Representatives election, District 60
| Party | Candidate | Votes | % |
|---|---|---|---|
| Democratic | John Freeman (incumbent) | 3,088 | 96.4 |
| Write-in | | 116 | 3.6 |
| Total votes | | 3,204 | 100.0 |
| Democratic hold | | | |
