= Wyoming's 56th House of Representatives district =

American legislative district

Wyoming's 56th State House of Representatives district
- Wyoming's 56th House of Representatives district as of 2022
Representative
Elissa Campbell; R–Casper
- Demographics: 88% White; 6% Hispanic; 1% Asian; 1% Native American; 5% Multiracial
- Population (2022): 8,873

Wyoming's 56th House of Representatives district is one of 62 districts in the Wyoming House of Representatives. The district encompasses part of Natrona County. It is represented by Republican Representative Elissa Campbell of Casper.

In 1992, the state of Wyoming switched from electing state legislators by county to a district-based system.

== List of members representing the district ==
Representative	Party	Term	Note
Patricia J. Nagel	Republican	1993 – 2003	Elected in 1992. Re-elected in 1994. Re-elected in 1996. Re-elected in 1998. Re-elected in 2000.
Tom Walsh	Republican	2003 – 2008	Elected in 2002. Re-elected in 2004. Re-elected in 2006. Resigned in 2008.
Tim Stubson	Republican	2008 – 2017	Appointed in 2008. Re-elected in 2008. Re-elected in 2010. Re-elected in 2012. Re-elected in 2014.
Jerry Obermueller	Republican	2017 – 2023	Elected in 2016. Re-elected in 2018. Re-elected in 2020. Elected in 2022.
Elissa Campbell	Republican	2025 – present	Elected in 2024.

== Recent election results ==
=== 2014 ===
House district 56 general election
Party	Candidate	Votes	%
Republican	Tim Stubson (incumbent)	1,929	97.32%
Write-ins		53	2.67%
Total votes		1,982	100.0%
Invalid or blank votes		556	
Republican hold			

=== 2016 ===
House district 56 general election
Party	Candidate	Votes	%
Republican	Jerry Obermueller	2,243	59.65%
Democratic	Dan Neal	1,512	40.21%
Write-ins		5	0.13%
Total votes		3,760	100.0%
Invalid or blank votes		222	
Republican hold			

=== 2018 ===
House district 56 general election
Party	Candidate	Votes	%
Republican	Jerry Obermueller (incumbent)	2,240	96.17%
Write-ins		89	3.82%
Total votes		2,329	100.0%
Invalid or blank votes		708	
Republican hold			

=== 2020 ===
House district 56 general election
Party	Candidate	Votes	%
Republican	Jerry Obermueller (incumbent)	3,166	96.73%
Write-ins		107	3.26%
Total votes		3,273	100.0%
Invalid or blank votes		918	
Republican hold			

=== 2022 ===
House district 56 general election
Party	Candidate	Votes	%
Republican	Jerry Obermueller (incumbent)	1,982	97.01%
Write-ins		61	2.98%
Total votes		2,043	100.0%
Invalid or blank votes		680	
Republican hold			

=== 2024 ===
House district 56 general election
Party	Candidate	Votes	%
Republican	Elissa Campbell	2,405	93.76%
Write-ins		160	6.23%
Total votes		2,565	100.0%
Invalid or blank votes		917	
Republican hold			

== Historical district boundaries ==
Map	Description	Apportionment Plan	Notes
	Natrona County (part)	1992 Apportionment Plan	
	Natrona County (part)	2002 Apportionment Plan	
	Natrona County (part)	2012 Apportionment Plan	
