= Wyoming's 22nd House of Representatives district =

American legislative district

Wyoming's 22nd State House of Representatives district
- Wyoming's 22nd House of Representatives district as of 2022
Representative
Andrew Byron; R–Jackson
- Demographics: 85% White; 11% Hispanic; 1% Asian; 1% Multiracial
- Population (2022): 8,124

Wyoming's 22nd House of Representatives district is one of 62 districts in the Wyoming House of Representatives. The district encompasses parts of Lincoln and Teton counties. It is represented by Republican Representative Andrew Byron of Jackson.

In 1992, the state of Wyoming switched from electing state legislators by county to a district-based system.

== List of members representing the district ==
Representative	Party	Term	Note
Budd Betts	Republican	1993 – 1999	Elected in 1992. Re-elected in 1994. Re-elected in 1996.
Jim Shivler	Republican	1999 – 2003	Elected in 1998. Re-elected in 2000.
Monte Olsen	Republican	2003 – 2009	Elected in 2002. Re-elected in 2004. Re-elected in 2006.
Jim Roscoe	Democratic	2009 – 2013	Elected in 2008. Re-elected in 2010.
Marti Halverson	Republican	2013 – 2019	Elected in 2012. Re-elected in 2014. Re-elected in 2016.
Jim Roscoe	Independent	2019 – 2023	Elected in 2018. Re-elected in 2020.
Andrew Byron	Republican	2023 – present	Elected in 2022. Re-elected in 2024.

== Recent election results ==
=== 2014 ===
House district 22 general election
Party	Candidate	Votes	%
Republican	Marti Halverson (Incumbent)	1,991	61.73%
Democratic	Natalia Macker	1,224	37.95%
Write-ins		10	0.31%
Total votes		3,225	100.0%
Invalid or blank votes		128	
Republican hold			

=== 2016 ===
House district 22 general election
Party	Candidate	Votes	%
Republican	Marti Halverson (Incumbent)	2,942	57.51%
Democratic	Marylee White	2,157	42.17%
Write-ins		16	0.31%
Total votes		5,115	100.0%
Invalid or blank votes		187	
Republican hold			

=== 2018 ===
House district 22 general election
Party	Candidate	Votes	%
Independent	Jim Roscoe	2,495	55.56%
Republican	Marti Halverson (Incumbent)	1,983	44.16%
Write-ins		12	0.26%
Total votes		4,490	100.0%
Invalid or blank votes		171	
Independent gain from Republican			

=== 2020 ===
House district 22 general election
Party	Candidate	Votes	%
Independent	Jim Roscoe (Incumbent)	3,191	52.47%
Republican	Bill Winney	2,825	46.45%
Write-ins		65	1.06%
Total votes		6,081	100.0%
Invalid or blank votes		338	
Independent hold			

=== 2022 ===
House district 22 general election
Party	Candidate	Votes	%
Republican	Andrew Byron	2,235	56.71%
Independent	Bob Strobel	1,681	42.65%
Write-ins		25	0.63%
Total votes		3,941	100.0%
Invalid or blank votes		248	
Republican gain from Independent			

=== 2024 ===
House district 22 general election
Party	Candidate	Votes	%
Republican	Andrew Byron (Incumbent)	4,189	96.76%
Write-ins		140	3.23%
Total votes		4,329	100.0%
Invalid or blank votes		1,355	
Republican hold			

== Historical district boundaries ==
Map	Description	Apportionment Plan	Notes
	Fremont County (part); Sublette County (part); Teton County (part)	1992 Apportionment Plan	
	Lincoln County (part); Sublette County (part); Teton County (part)	2002 Apportionment Plan	
	Lincoln County (part); Sublette County (part); Teton County (part)	2012 Apportionment Plan	
