= Hessenthaler =

Hessenthaler is a surname. Notable people with the surname include:

- Andy Hessenthaler (born 1965), English footballer
- Charles Hessenthaler (1947–2023), American politician
- Jake Hessenthaler (born 1994), English footballer
- John Hessenthaler (born 1951), English promoter
