= Wyoming's 50th House of Representatives district =

American legislative district

Wyoming's 50th State House of Representatives district
- Wyoming's 50th House of Representatives district as of 2022
Representative
Rachel Rodriguez-Williams; R–Cody
- Demographics: 91% White; 3% Hispanic; 2% Other; 3% Multiracial
- Population (2022): 9,671

Wyoming's 50th House of Representatives district is one of 62 districts in the Wyoming House of Representatives. The district encompasses part of Park County. It is represented by Republican Representative Rachel Rodriguez-Williams of Cody.

In 1992, the state of Wyoming switched from electing state legislators by county to a district-based system.

== List of members representing the district ==
Representative	Party	Term	Note
Joe Reed	Republican	1993 – 1997	Elected in 1992. Re-elected in 1994.
Pat Childers	Republican	1997 – 2013	Elected in 1996. Re-elected in 1998. Re-elected in 2000. Re-elected in 2002. Re-elected in 2004. Re-elected in 2006. Re-elected in 2008. Re-elected in 2010.
David Northrup	Republican	2013 – 2021	Elected in 2012. Re-elected in 2014. Re-elected in 2016. Re-elected in 2018.
Rachel Rodriguez-Williams	Republican	2021 – present	Elected in 2020. Re-elected in 2022. Re-elected in 2024.

== Recent election results ==
=== 2014 ===
House district 50 general election
Party	Candidate	Votes	%
Republican	David Northrup (incumbent)	2,726	97.35%
Write-ins		74	2.64%
Total votes		2,800	100.0%
Invalid or blank votes		518	
Republican hold			

=== 2016 ===
House district 50 general election
Party	Candidate	Votes	%
Republican	David Northrup (incumbent)	4,077	81.78%
Democratic	Mike Specht	879	17.63%
Write-ins		29	0.58%
Total votes		4,985	100.0%
Invalid or blank votes		300	
Republican hold			

=== 2018 ===
House district 50 general election
Party	Candidate	Votes	%
Republican	David Northrup (incumbent)	3,288	80.72%
Democratic	Mike Specht	763	18.73%
Write-ins		22	0.54%
Total votes		4,073	100.0%
Invalid or blank votes		154	
Republican hold			

=== 2020 ===
House district 50 general election
Party	Candidate	Votes	%
Republican	Rachel Rodriguez-Williams	4,373	77.61%
Independent	Cindy Johnson Bennett	1,241	22.02%
Write-ins		20	0.35%
Total votes		5,634	100.0%
Invalid or blank votes		396	
Republican hold			

=== 2022 ===
House district 50 general election
Party	Candidate	Votes	%
Republican	Rachel Rodriguez-Williams (incumbent)	3,412	82.31%
Libertarian	Carrie Satterwhite	702	16.93%
Write-ins		31	0.74%
Total votes		4,145	100.0%
Invalid or blank votes		242	
Republican hold			

=== 2024 ===
House district 50 general election
Party	Candidate	Votes	%
Republican	Rachel Rodriguez-Williams (incumbent)	4,510	94.54%
Write-ins		260	5.45%
Total votes		4,770	100.0%
Invalid or blank votes		931	
Republican hold			

== Historical district boundaries ==
Map	Description	Apportionment Plan	Notes
	Park County (part)	1992 Apportionment Plan	
	Park County (part)	2002 Apportionment Plan	
	Park County (part)	2012 Apportionment Plan	
