= Wyoming's 23rd House of Representatives district =

American legislative district

Wyoming's 23rd State House of Representatives district
- Wyoming's 23rd House of Representatives district as of 2022
Representative
Liz Storer; D–Jackson
- Demographics: 88% White; 6% Hispanic; 1% Asian; 2% Other; 3% Multiracial
- Population (2022): 10,229

Wyoming's 23rd House of Representatives district is one of 62 districts in the Wyoming House of Representatives. The district encompasses part of Teton County. It is represented by Democratic Representative Liz Storer of Jackson.

In 1992, the state of Wyoming switched from electing state legislators by county to a district-based system.

== List of members representing the district ==
Representative	Party	Term	Note
Clarene Law	Republican	1993 – 2005	Elected in 1992. Re-elected in 1994. Re-elected in 1996. Re-elected in 1998. Re-elected in 2000. Re-elected in 2002.
Keith Gingery	Republican	2005 – 2014	Elected in 2004. Re-elected in 2006. Re-elected in 2008. Re-elected in 2010. Re-elected in 2012. Resigned in 2014.
Andy Schwartz	Democratic	2015 – 2023	Elected in 2014. Re-elected in 2016. Re-elected in 2018. Re-elected in 2020.
Liz Storer	Democratic	2023 – present	Elected in 2022. Re-elected in 2024.

== Recent election results ==
=== 2014 ===
House district 23 general election
Party	Candidate	Votes	%
Democratic	Andy Schwartz	2,133	55.57%
Republican	Jim Darwiche	1,697	44.21%
Write-ins		8	0.20%
Total votes		3,838	100.0%
Invalid or blank votes		118	
Democratic gain from Republican			

=== 2016 ===
House district 23 general election
Party	Candidate	Votes	%
Democratic	Andy Schwartz (Incumbent)	4,199	95.60%
Write-ins		193	4.39%
Total votes		4,392	100.0%
Invalid or blank votes		1520	
Democratic hold			

=== 2018 ===
House district 23 general election
Party	Candidate	Votes	%
Democratic	Andy Schwartz (Incumbent)	3,358	62.88%
Republican	Alex Muromcew	1,979	37.05%
Write-ins		3	0.05%
Total votes		5,340	100.0%
Invalid or blank votes		139	
Democratic hold			

=== 2020 ===
House district 23 general election
Party	Candidate	Votes	%
Democratic	Andy Schwartz (Incumbent)	4,885	95.02%
Write-ins		256	4.97%
Total votes		5,141	100.0%
Invalid or blank votes		1796	
Democratic hold			

=== 2022 ===
House district 23 general election
Party	Candidate	Votes	%
Democratic	Liz Storer	2,489	51.51%
Republican	Paul Vogelheim	2,326	48.13%
Write-ins		17	0.35%
Total votes		4,832	100.0%
Invalid or blank votes		93	
Democratic hold			

=== 2024 ===
House district 23 general election
Party	Candidate	Votes	%
Democratic	Liz Storer (Incumbent)	4,434	95.08%
Write-ins		229	4.91%
Total votes		4,663	100.0%
Invalid or blank votes		1718	
Democratic hold			

== Historical district boundaries ==
Map	Description	Apportionment Plan	Notes
	Teton County (part)	1992 Apportionment Plan	
	Fremont County (part); Teton County (part)	2002 Apportionment Plan	
	Teton County (part)	2012 Apportionment Plan	
