= Wyoming's 19th House of Representatives district =

American legislative district

Wyoming's 19th State House of Representatives district
- Wyoming's 19th House of Representatives district as of 2022
Representative
Joe Webb; R–Lyman
- Demographics: 85% White; 12% Hispanic; 3% Multiracial
- Population (2022): 8,163

Wyoming's 19th House of Representatives district is one of 62 districts in the Wyoming House of Representatives. The district encompasses part of Uinta County. It is represented by Republican Representative Joe Webb of Lyman.

In 1992, the state of Wyoming switched from electing state legislators by county to a district-based system.

== List of members representing the district ==
Representative	Party	Term	Note
Wayne Morrow	Democratic	1993 – 1997	Elected in 1992. Re-elected in 1994. Re-elected in 1996. Resigned in 1997.
Peggy L. Rounds	Democratic	1997 – 2001	Appointed in 1997. Re-elected in 1998.
Owen Petersen	Republican	2001 – 2013	Elected in 2000. Re-elected in 2002. Re-elected in 2004. Re-elected in 2006. Re-elected in 2008. Re-elected in 2010.
Allen Jaggi	Republican	2013 – 2017	Elected in 2012. Re-elected in 2014.
Danny Eyre	Republican	2017 – 2023	Elected in 2016. Re-elected in 2018. Re-elected in 2020.
Jon Conrad	Republican	2023 – 2025	Elected in 2022.
Joe Webb	Republican	2025 – present	Elected in 2024.
Chad Stephens	Republican	2027 – member-elect	Elected in 2026.

== Recent election results ==
=== 2014 ===
House district 19 general election
Party	Candidate	Votes	%
Republican	Allen Jaggi (Incumbent)	1,897	69.97%
Democratic	Pete Roitz	806	29.73%
Write-ins		8	0.29%
Total votes		2,711	100.0%
Invalid or blank votes		68	
Republican hold			

=== 2016 ===
House district 19 general election
Party	Candidate	Votes	%
Republican	Danny Eyre	3,286	84.51%
Democratic	Mel McCreary	592	15.22%
Write-ins		10	0.25%
Total votes		3,888	100.0%
Invalid or blank votes		165	
Republican hold			

=== 2018 ===
House district 19 general election
Party	Candidate	Votes	%
Republican	Danny Eyre (Incumbent)	2,617	98.08%
Write-ins		51	1.91%
Total votes		2,668	100.0%
Invalid or blank votes		317	
Republican hold			

=== 2020 ===
House district 19 general election
Party	Candidate	Votes	%
Republican	Danny Eyre (Incumbent)	3,915	97.07%
Write-ins		118	2.92%
Total votes		4,033	100.0%
Invalid or blank votes		504	
Republican hold			

=== 2022 ===
House district 19 general election
Party	Candidate	Votes	%
Republican	Jon Conrad	1,748	57.31%
Democratic	Sarah Butters	374	12.26%
Write-ins		928	30.42%
Total votes		3,050	100.0%
Invalid or blank votes		122	
Republican hold			

=== 2024 ===
House district 19 general election
Party	Candidate	Votes	%
Republican	Joe Webb	3,012	76.64%
Write-ins		918	23.35%
Total votes		3,930	100.0%
Invalid or blank votes		319	
Republican hold			

== Historical district boundaries ==
Map	Description	Apportionment Plan	Notes
	Uinta County (part)	1992 Apportionment Plan	
	Uinta County (part)	2002 Apportionment Plan	
	Uinta County (part)	2012 Apportionment Plan	
