= Wyoming's 46th House of Representatives district =

American legislative district

Wyoming's 46th State House of Representatives district
- Wyoming's 46th House of Representatives district as of 2022
Representative
Ocean Andrew; R–Laramie
- Demographics: 80% White; 14% Hispanic; 1% Asian; 5% Multiracial
- Population (2022): 9,721

Wyoming's 46th House of Representatives district is one of 62 districts in the Wyoming House of Representatives. The district encompasses part of Albany County. It is represented by Republican Representative Ocean Andrew of Laramie.

In 1992, the state of Wyoming switched from electing state legislators by county to a district-based system.

== List of members representing the district ==
Representative	Party	Term	Note
Patti L. MacMillan	Republican	1993 – 1997	Elected in 1992. Re-elected in 1994.
Tom Rardin	Republican	1997 – 2001	Elected in 1996. Re-elected in 1998.
James J. Slater	Republican	2001 – 2009	Elected in 2000. Re-elected in 2002. Re-elected in 2004. Re-elected in 2006.
Glenn Moniz	Republican	2009 – 2017	Elected in 2008. Re-elected in 2010. Re-elected in 2012. Re-elected in 2014.
Bill Haley	Republican	2017 – 2021	Elected in 2016. Re-elected in 2018.
Ocean Andrew	Republican	2021 – present	Elected in 2020. Re-elected in 2022. Re-elected in 2024.
Cam Wright	Republican	2027 – member-elect	Elected in 2026.

== Recent election results ==
=== 2014 ===
House district 46 general election
Party	Candidate	Votes	%
Republican	Glenn Moniz (incumbent)	1,826	53.53%
Democratic	Mike Selmer	1,579	46.29%
Write-ins		6	0.17%
Total votes		3,411	100.0%
Invalid or blank votes		116	
Republican hold			

=== 2016 ===
House district 46 general election
Party	Candidate	Votes	%
Republican	Bill Haley	2,935	58.37%
Democratic	Ken Chestek	2,086	41.48%
Write-ins		7	0.13%
Total votes		5,028	100.0%
Invalid or blank votes		284	
Republican hold			

=== 2018 ===
House district 46 general election
Party	Candidate	Votes	%
Republican	Bill Haley (incumbent)	2,317	54.24%
Democratic	Jackie Grimes	1,944	45.51%
Write-ins		10	0.23%
Total votes		4,271	100.0%
Invalid or blank votes		207	
Republican hold			

=== 2020 ===
House district 46 general election
Party	Candidate	Votes	%
Republican	Ocean Andrew	3,409	59.24%
Democratic	Tim Chesnut	2,323	40.37%
Write-ins		22	0.38%
Total votes		5,754	100.0%
Invalid or blank votes		194	
Republican hold			

=== 2022 ===
House district 46 general election
Party	Candidate	Votes	%
Republican	Ocean Andrew (incumbent)	2,642	68.62%
Democratic	Merav Ben-David	1,201	31.19%
Write-ins		7	0.18%
Total votes		3,850	100.0%
Invalid or blank votes		62	
Republican hold			

=== 2024 ===
House district 46 general election
Party	Candidate	Votes	%
Republican	Ocean Andrew (incumbent)	3,411	69.47%
Democratic	Chris Lowry	1,481	30.16%
Write-ins		18	0.36%
Total votes		4,910	100.0%
Invalid or blank votes		173	
Republican hold			

== Historical district boundaries ==
Map	Description	Apportionment Plan	Notes
	Albany County (part)	1992 Apportionment Plan	
	Albany County (part)	2002 Apportionment Plan	
	Albany County (part)	2012 Apportionment Plan	
