= Carolyn Paseneaux =

Wyoming politician

Member of the Wyoming House of Representatives from the 38th district
- In office 1993–2002
- Preceded by: Constituency established
- Succeeded by: Bob Brechtel

Carolyn Paseneaux is an American Republican politician from Casper, Wyoming. She represented the 38th district in the Wyoming House of Representatives from 1993 to 2002.
