= Wyoming's 26th House of Representatives district =

American legislative district

Wyoming's 26th State House of Representatives district
- Wyoming's 26th House of Representatives district as of 2022
Representative
Dalton Banks; R–Cowley
- Demographics: 85% White; 1% Black; 10% Hispanic; 1% Asian; 3% Multiracial
- Population (2022): 9,515

Wyoming's 26th House of Representatives district is one of 62 districts in the Wyoming House of Representatives. The district encompasses parts of Big Horn and Park counties. It is represented by Republican Representative Dalton Banks of Cowley.

In 1992, the state of Wyoming switched from electing state legislators by county to a district-based system.

== List of members representing the district ==
Representative	Party	Term	Note
Sylvia S. Gams	Republican	1993 – 1997	Elected in 1992. Re-elected in 1994.
Charles Hessenthaler	Republican	1997 – 2003	Elected in 1996. Re-elected in 1998. Re-elected in 2000.
Elaine Harvey	Republican	2003 – 2017	Elected in 2002. Re-elected in 2004. Re-elected in 2006. Re-elected in 2008. Re-elected in 2010. Re-elected in 2012. Re-elected in 2014.
Jamie Flitner	Republican	2017 – 2023	Elected in 2016. Re-elected in 2018. Re-elected in 2020.
Dalton Banks	Republican	2023 – present	Elected in 2022. Re-elected in 2024.

== Recent election results ==
=== 2014 ===
House district 26 general election
Party	Candidate	Votes	%
Republican	Elaine Harvey (Incumbent)	1,907	61.69%
Constitution	Joyce Collins	1,179	38.14%
Write-ins		5	0.16%
Total votes		3,091	100.0%
Invalid or blank votes		152	
Republican hold			

=== 2016 ===
House district 26 general election
Party	Candidate	Votes	%
Republican	Jamie Flitner	2,665	65.70%
Constitution	Joyce Collins	1,001	24.67%
Democratic	Jean Petty	384	9.46%
Write-ins		6	0.14%
Total votes		4,056	100.0%
Invalid or blank votes		76	
Republican hold			

=== 2018 ===
House district 26 general election
Party	Candidate	Votes	%
Republican	Jamie Flitner (Incumbent)	2,832	98.84%
Write-ins		33	1.15%
Total votes		2,865	100.0%
Invalid or blank votes		428	
Republican hold			

=== 2020 ===
House district 26 general election
Party	Candidate	Votes	%
Republican	Jamie Flitner (Incumbent)	3,959	98.45%
Write-ins		62	1.54%
Total votes		4,021	100.0%
Invalid or blank votes		372	
Republican hold			

=== 2022 ===
House district 26 general election
Party	Candidate	Votes	%
Republican	Dalton Banks	2,931	97.60%
Write-ins		72	2.39%
Total votes		3,003	100.0%
Invalid or blank votes		394	
Republican hold			

=== 2024 ===
House district 26 general election
Party	Candidate	Votes	%
Republican	Dalton Banks (Incumbent)	3,942	97.52%
Write-ins		100	2.47%
Total votes		4,042	100.0%
Invalid or blank votes		497	
Republican hold			

== Historical district boundaries ==
Map	Description	Apportionment Plan	Notes
	Big Horn County (part)	1992 Apportionment Plan	
	Big Horn County (part); Park County (part)	2002 Apportionment Plan	
	Big Horn County (part); Park County (part)	2012 Apportionment Plan	
