= Wyoming's 35th House of Representatives district =

American legislative district

Wyoming's 35th State House of Representatives district
- Wyoming's 35th House of Representatives district as of 2022
Representative
Tony Locke; R–Casper
- Demographics: 91% White; 5% Hispanic; 1% Asian; 1% Native American; 1% Multiracial
- Population (2022): 8,200

Wyoming's 35th House of Representatives district is one of 62 districts in the Wyoming House of Representatives. The district encompasses part of Natrona County. It is represented by Republican Representative Tony Locke of Casper.

In 1992, the state of Wyoming switched from electing state legislators by county to a district-based system.

== List of members representing the district ==
Representative	Party	Term	Note
Dorothy A. Perkins	Republican	1993 – 1999	Elected in 1992. Re-elected in 1994. Re-elected in 1996.
Roy Cohee	Republican	1999 – 2011	Elected in 1998. Re-elected in 2000. Re-elected in 2002. Re-elected in 2004. Re-elected in 2006. Re-elected in 2008.
Kendell Kroeker	Republican	2011 – 2016	Elected in 2010. Re-elected in 2012. Re-elected in 2014. Re-elected in 2016. Resigned in 2016.
Joe MacGuire	Republican	2017 – 2023	Appointed in 2017. Re-elected in 2018. Re-elected in 2020.
Tony Locke	Republican	2023 – present	Elected in 2022. Re-elected in 2024.
Christopher Dresang	Republican	2027 – member-elect	Elected in 2026.

== Recent election results ==
=== 2014 ===
House district 35 general election
Party	Candidate	Votes	%
Republican	Kendell Kroeker (Incumbent)	2,519	94.69%
Write-ins		141	5.30%
Total votes		2,660	100.0%
Invalid or blank votes		757	
Republican hold			

=== 2016 ===
House district 35 general election
Party	Candidate	Votes	%
Republican	Kendell Kroeker (Incumbent)	3,879	74.81%
Democratic	Brett Governanti	1,286	24.80%
Write-ins		20	0.38%
Total votes		5,185	100.0%
Invalid or blank votes		387	
Republican hold			

=== 2018 ===
House district 35 general election
Party	Candidate	Votes	%
Republican	Joe MacGuire (Incumbent)	3,411	98.10%
Write-ins		66	1.89%
Total votes		3,477	100.0%
Invalid or blank votes		735	
Republican hold			

=== 2020 ===
House district 35 general election
Party	Candidate	Votes	%
Republican	Joe MacGuire (Incumbent)	5,046	97.71%
Write-ins		118	2.28%
Total votes		5,164	100.0%
Invalid or blank votes		919	
Republican hold			

=== 2022 ===
House district 35 general election
Party	Candidate	Votes	%
Republican	Tony Locke	2,465	94.99%
Write-ins		130	5.00%
Total votes		2,595	100.0%
Invalid or blank votes		677	
Republican hold			

=== 2024 ===
House district 35 general election
Party	Candidate	Votes	%
Republican	Tony Locke (Incumbent)	3,409	93.37%
Write-ins		242	6.62%
Total votes		3,651	100.0%
Invalid or blank votes		919	
Republican hold			

== Historical district boundaries ==
Map	Description	Apportionment Plan	Notes
	Natrona County (part)	1992 Apportionment Plan	
	Natrona County (part)	2002 Apportionment Plan	
	Natrona County (part)	2012 Apportionment Plan	
