= Wyoming's 6th House of Representatives district =

American legislative district

Wyoming's 6th State House of Representatives district
- Wyoming's 6th House of Representatives district as of 2022
Representative
Tomi Strock; R–Douglas
- Demographics: 87% White; 10% Hispanic; 3% Multiracial
- Population (2022): 9,581

Wyoming's 6th House of Representatives district is one of 62 districts in the Wyoming House of Representatives. The district encompasses part of Converse County. It is represented by Republican Representative Tomi Strock of Douglas.

In 1992, the state of Wyoming switched from electing state legislators by county to a district-based system.

== List of members representing the district ==
Representative	Party	Term	Note
Frank N. Moore	Republican	1993 – 1997	Elected in 1992. Re-elected in 1994.
Jim Anderson	Republican	1997 – 2001	Elected in 1996. Re-elected in 1998.
Dave Edwards	Republican	2001 – 2009	Elected in 2000. Re-elected in 2002. Re-elected in 2004. Re-elected in 2006.
Richard Cannady	Republican	2009 – 2017	Elected in 2008. Re-elected in 2010. Re-elected in 2012. Re-elected in 2014.
Aaron Clausen	Republican	2017 – 2023	Elected in 2016. Re-elected in 2018. Re-elected in 2020.
Tomi Strock	Republican	2023 – present	Elected in 2022. Re-elected in 2024.

== Recent election results ==
=== 2014 ===
House district 6 general election
Party	Candidate	Votes	%
Republican	Richard Cannady (Incumbent)	2,341	81.68%
Democratic	Liz Batton	494	17.23%
Write-ins		31	1.08%
Total votes		2,866	100.0%
Invalid or blank votes		197	
Republican hold			

=== 2016 ===
House district 6 general election
Party	Candidate	Votes	%
Republican	Aaron Clausen	3,996	87.42%
Democratic	Shalyn C. Anderson	565	12.36%
Write-ins		10	0.21%
Total votes		4,571	100.0%
Invalid or blank votes		227	
Republican hold			

=== 2018 ===
House district 6 general election
Party	Candidate	Votes	%
Republican	Aaron Clausen (Incumbent)	2,942	99.22%
Write-ins		23	0.77%
Total votes		2,965	100.0%
Invalid or blank votes		609	
Republican hold			

=== 2020 ===
House district 6 general election
Party	Candidate	Votes	%
Republican	Aaron Clausen (Incumbent)	4,296	98.50%
Write-ins		65	1.49%
Total votes		4,361	100.0%
Invalid or blank votes		631	
Republican hold			

=== 2022 ===
House district 6 general election
Party	Candidate	Votes	%
Republican	Tomi Strock	2,266	63.50%
Independent	Bruce Jones	1,079	30.24%
Democratic	Hank Szramkowski	218	6.10%
Write-ins		5	0.14%
Total votes		3,568	100.0%
Invalid or blank votes		74	
Republican hold			

=== 2024 ===
House district 6 general election
Party	Candidate	Votes	%
Republican	Tomi Strock (Incumbent)	3,742	92.80%
Write-ins		290	7.19%
Total votes		4,032	100.0%
Invalid or blank votes		705	
Republican hold			

== Historical district boundaries ==
Map	Description	Apportionment Plan	Notes
	Converse County (part)	1992 Apportionment Plan	
	Converse County (part)	2002 Apportionment Plan	
	Converse County (part)	2012 Apportionment Plan	
