= Wyoming's 38th House of Representatives district =

American legislative district

Wyoming's 38th State House of Representatives district
- Wyoming's 38th House of Representatives district as of 2022
Representative
Jayme Lien; R–Casper
- Demographics: 89% White; 1% Black; 5% Hispanic; 4% Multiracial
- Population (2022): 9,529

Wyoming's 38th House of Representatives district is one of 62 districts in the Wyoming House of Representatives. The district encompasses part of Natrona County. It is represented by Republican Representative Jayme Lien of Casper.

In 1992, the state of Wyoming switched from electing state legislators by county to a district-based system.

== List of members representing the district ==
Representative	Party	Term	Note
Carolyn Paseneaux	Republican	1993 – 2003	Elected in 1992. Re-elected in 1994. Re-elected in 1996. Re-elected in 1998. Re-elected in 2000.
Bob Brechtel	Republican	2003 – 2013	Elected in 2002. Re-elected in 2004. Re-elected in 2006. Re-elected in 2008. Re-elected in 2010.
Tom Walters	Republican	2013 – 2025	Elected in 2012. Re-elected in 2014. Re-elected in 2016. Re-elected in 2018. Re-elected in 2020. Re-elected in 2022.
Jayme Lien	Republican	2025 – present	Elected in 2024.
Robert Hendry	Republican	2027 – member-elect	Elected in 2026.

== Recent election results ==
=== 2014 ===
House district 38 general election
Party	Candidate	Votes	%
Republican	Tom Walters (Incumbent)	2,261	98.17%
Write-ins		42	1.82%
Total votes		2,303	100.0%
Invalid or blank votes		501	
Republican hold			

=== 2016 ===
House district 38 general election
Party	Candidate	Votes	%
Republican	Tom Walters (Incumbent)	3,528	97.78%
Write-ins		80	2.21%
Total votes		3,608	100.0%
Invalid or blank votes		787	
Republican hold			

=== 2018 ===
House district 38 general election
Party	Candidate	Votes	%
Republican	Tom Walters (Incumbent)	2,656	97.68%
Write-ins		63	2.31%
Total votes		2,719	100.0%
Invalid or blank votes		492	
Republican hold			

=== 2020 ===
House district 38 general election
Party	Candidate	Votes	%
Republican	Tom Walters (Incumbent)	3,277	75.09%
Democratic	Shawn Johnson	1,068	24.47%
Write-ins		19	0.43%
Total votes		4,364	100.0%
Invalid or blank votes		313	
Republican hold			

=== 2022 ===
House district 38 general election
Party	Candidate	Votes	%
Republican	Tom Walters (Incumbent)	2,233	96.62%
Write-ins		78	3.37%
Total votes		2,311	100.0%
Invalid or blank votes		452	
Republican hold			

=== 2024 ===
House district 38 general election
Party	Candidate	Votes	%
Republican	Jayme Lien	3,253	95.64%
Write-ins		148	4.35%
Total votes		3,401	100.0%
Invalid or blank votes		736	
Republican hold			

== Historical district boundaries ==
Map	Description	Apportionment Plan	Notes
	Fremont County (part); Natrona County (part)	1992 Apportionment Plan	
	Natrona County (part)	2002 Apportionment Plan	
	Natrona County (part)	2012 Apportionment Plan	
