= Eamon O'Toole =

American politician

Member-elect of the Wyoming House of Representatives from the 47th district
- Assuming office January 2027
- Succeeding: Bob Davis

Personal details
- Party: Republican

Eamon O'Toole is an American politician. A member of the Republican Party, he is the member-elect for the 47th district of the Wyoming House of Representatives.
