= Owen Petersen =

American politician (born 1942)

Owen Peterson

Majority Whip of the Wyoming House of Representatives
- In office 2005–2006

Member of the Wyoming House of Representatives from the 19th district
- In office 2001–2013
- Preceded by: Peggy L. Rounds
- Succeeded by: Allen Jaggi

Personal details
- Born: November 29, 1942 (age 83) Lyman, Wyoming, U.S.
- Party: Republican
- Spouse: Mary Jean
- Children: 3
- Education: University of Wyoming (BS, MS, JD)
- Occupation: Politician

Military service
- Allegiance: United States
- Branch/service: United States Marine Corps; United States Air Force

Owen Petersen (born November 29, 1942) is a former Republican member of the Wyoming State House of Representatives. He represented the 19th district (encompassing Uinta County) from 2001 to 2013.

== Biography ==
Owen Petersen was born on November 19, 1942, in Lyman, Wyoming. He received a B.S. in 1965, an M.S. in 1967, and a J.D. in 1974, all from the University of Wyoming.

He is a retired military officer.

He served as a member of the Wyoming House of Representatives from 2001 to 2013. In 2009, he sponsored HB 74, a bill that would have made marriage contracts from out-of-state valid in Wyoming so long as they involve one man and one woman.

He is a member of the National Rifle Association of America, the American Legion, the Lions Clubs International, Ducks Unlimited, and the AARP. He is a member of the Church of Jesus Christ of Latter-day Saints. He is married with three children and seven grandchildren.
