= Jon Conrad =

American politician

Member of the Wyoming House of Representatives from the 19th district
- In office January 10, 2023 – January 6, 2025
- Preceded by: Danny Eyre
- Succeeded by: Joe Webb

Personal details
- Born: Findlay, Ohio, U.S.
- Party: Republican
- Education: Weber State University (BS); University of Phoenix (MBA)
- Profession: Environmental/governmental affairs manager

Jon Conrad is an American politician who was a Republican member of the Wyoming House of Representatives representing the 19th district from January 10, 2023 to January 6, 2025.

== Political career ==
When incumbent Republican representative Danny Eyre announced his retirement, Conrad declared his candidacy and won the Republican primary on August 16, 2022 with 44% of the vote, defeating future acting Wyoming Secretary of State Karl Allred and candidate Andy Stocks. He then won the general election on November 8, 2022, defeating Democratic nominee Sarah Butters and write-in Republican candidate Joe Webb, who was endorsed by the Uinta County Republican Party with 57% of the vote.
