= Peggy L. Rounds =

Wyoming politician

Member of the Wyoming House of Representatives from the 19th district
- In office 1997–2000
- Preceded by: Wayne Morrow
- Succeeded by: Owen Petersen

Personal details
- Party: Democratic

Peggy L. Rounds (born October 6, 1957) is an American Democratic politician from Evanston, Uinta County, Wyoming. She represented the 19th district in the Wyoming House of Representatives from 1997 to 2000. She was initially appointed to the state House following Wayne Morrow's resignation.
