= Wyoming's 14th House of Representatives district =

American legislative district

Wyoming's 14th State House of Representatives district
- Wyoming's 14th House of Representatives district as of 2022
Representative
| Trey Sherwood; D–Laramie |
- Demographics: 86% White; 1% Black; 5% Hispanic; 5% Asian; 4% Multiracial
- Population (2022): 9,620

Wyoming's 14th House of Representatives district is one of 62 districts in the Wyoming House of Representatives. The district encompasses part of Albany County. It is represented by Democratic Representative Trey Sherwood of Laramie.

In 1992, the state of Wyoming switched from electing state legislators by county to a district-based system.

== List of members representing the district ==
| Representative | Party | Term | Note |
|---|---|---|---|
| Irene Devin | Republican | 1993 – 1997 | Elected in 1992. Re-elected in 1994. |
| Phil Nicholas | Republican | 1997 – 2005 | Elected in 1996. Re-elected in 1998. Re-elected in 2000. Re-elected in 2002. |
| Kermit Brown | Republican | 2005 – 2017 | Elected in 2004. Re-elected in 2006. Re-elected in 2008. Re-elected in 2010. Re-elected in 2012. Re-elected in 2014. |
| Dan Furphy | Republican | 2017 – 2021 | Elected in 2016. Re-elected in 2018. |
| Trey Sherwood | Democratic | 2021 – present | Elected in 2020. Re-elected in 2022. Re-elected in 2024. |

== Recent election results ==
=== 2014 ===
House district 14 general election
| Party | Candidate | Votes | % |
|---|---|---|---|
| Republican | Kermit Brown (Incumbent) | 1,722 | 96.36% |
| Write-ins | | 65 | 3.63% |
| Total votes | | 1,787 | 100.0% |
| Invalid or blank votes | | 611 | |
| Republican hold | | | |

=== 2016 ===
House district 14 general election
| Party | Candidate | Votes | % |
|---|---|---|---|
| Republican | Dan Furphy | 2,216 | 59.73% |
| Democratic | Erin C. O'Doherty | 1,489 | 40.13% |
| Write-ins | | 5 | 0.13% |
| Total votes | | 3,710 | 100.0% |
| Invalid or blank votes | | 308 | |
| Republican hold | | | |

=== 2018 ===
House district 14 general election
| Party | Candidate | Votes | % |
|---|---|---|---|
| Republican | Dan Furphy (Incumbent) | 1,714 | 51.24% |
| Democratic | Lorraine Saulino-Klein | 1,628 | 48.66% |
| Write-ins | | 3 | 0.08% |
| Total votes | | 3,345 | 100.0% |
| Invalid or blank votes | | 178 | |
| Republican hold | | | |

=== 2020 ===
House district 14 general election
| Party | Candidate | Votes | % |
|---|---|---|---|
| Democratic | Trey Sherwood | 2,148 | 50.88% |
| Republican | Matthew Burkhart | 2,063 | 48.87% |
| Write-ins | | 10 | 0.23% |
| Total votes | | 4,221 | 100.0% |
| Invalid or blank votes | | 193 | |
| Democratic gain from Republican | | | |

=== 2022 ===
House district 14 general election
| Party | Candidate | Votes | % |
|---|---|---|---|
| Democratic | Trey Sherwood (Incumbent) | 1,955 | 54.51% |
| Republican | Bryan Shuster | 1,621 | 45.20% |
| Write-ins | | 10 | 0.27% |
| Total votes | | 3,586 | 100.0% |
| Invalid or blank votes | | 60 | |
| Democratic hold | | | |

=== 2024 ===
House district 14 general election
| Party | Candidate | Votes | % |
|---|---|---|---|
| Democratic | Trey Sherwood (Incumbent) | 2,472 | 51.94% |
| Republican | Joe Giustozzi | 2,279 | 47.88% |
| Write-ins | | 8 | 0.16% |
| Total votes | | 4,759 | 100.0% |
| Invalid or blank votes | | 137 | |
| Democratic hold | | | |

== Historical district boundaries ==
| Map | Description | Apportionment Plan | Notes |
|---|---|---|---|
| | Albany County (part) | 1992 Apportionment Plan | |
| | Albany County (part) | 2002 Apportionment Plan | |
| | Albany County (part) | 2012 Apportionment Plan | |
