= Clarene Law =

American politician (born 1933)

Member of the Wyoming House of Representatives
- In office January 8, 1991 – January 11, 2005
- Succeeded by: Keith Gingery
- Constituency: Teton County (1991-1992); 23rd district (1993-2005)

Personal details
- Born: July 22, 1933 Thornton, Idaho
- Died: September 21, 2022 (aged 89)
- Party: Republican

Clarene Law (July 22, 1933 – September 21, 2022) was an American politician who served in the Wyoming House of Representatives from 1991 to 2005. She represented Teton County from 1991 to 1992, and the represented the 23rd district from 1993 to 2005.
