= Tony Locke (politician) =

American politician

Member of the Wyoming House of Representatives from the 35th district
- Incumbent
- Assumed office January 2, 2023
- Preceded by: Joe MacGuire
- Succeeded by: Christopher Dresang (elect)

Personal details
- Party: Republican

Tony Locke is an American politician. He serves as a Republican member for the 35th district of the Wyoming House of Representatives.
