= Frank Crum =

American football player (born 2000)

No. 73 – Denver Broncos
- Position: Offensive tackle
- Roster status: Injured reserve/designated for return

Personal information
- Born: May 14, 2000 (age 26); Laramie, Wyoming, U.S.
- Listed height: 6 ft 7 in (2.01 m)
- Listed weight: 315 lb (143 kg)

Career information
- High school: Laramie
- College: Wyoming (2018–2023)
- NFL draft: 2024: undrafted

Career history
- Denver Broncos (2024–present)

Awards and highlights
- First-team All-Mountain West (2023); Third-team All-Mountain West (2022)

Career NFL statistics as of 2025
- Games played: 17
- Games started: 2
- Stats at Pro Football Reference

Frank Crum (born May 14, 2000) is an American professional football offensive tackle for the Denver Broncos of the National Football League (NFL). He played college football for the Wyoming Cowboys and was signed by the Broncos as an undrafted free agent in 2024.

== Early life ==
Crum's father, Gary Crum, was an all-conference player for the Wyoming Cowboys in the 1980s, while his grandfather, Earl, played for the team in 1940. He grew up in Laramie, Wyoming, and attended Laramie High School, where he played football and basketball and was a first-team all-conference offensive lineman. He was ranked a zero-star recruit and committed to play college football at Wyoming.

== College career ==
Crum redshirted as a true freshman at Wyoming in 2018. After playing in 12 games, mostly as a backup, in 2019, he started all six games in the COVID-19-affected 2020 season. He started all 13 games in 2021 and was chosen honorable mention All-Mountain West Conference (MW). In 2022, he was named third-team All-MW by Pro Football Focus. He returned for a final season in 2023 and was named first-team all-conference. He ended his collegiate career with 55 games played and 48 starts. He played at the 2024 Hula Bowl and was invited to the NFL Scouting Combine, where he had the second-fastest 40-yard dash among offensive linemen.

== Professional career ==
Pre-draft measurables
Height	Weight	Arm length	Hand span	Wingspan	40-yard dash	10-yard split	20-yard split	20-yard shuttle	Three-cone drill	Vertical jump	Broad jump	Bench press
6 ft 8 1/4 in (2.04 m)	313 lb (142 kg)	33 7/8 in (0.86 m)	10 1/2 in (0.27 m)	6 ft 10 in (2.08 m)	4.94 s	1.69 s	2.86 s	4.73 s	7.39 s	31.5 in (0.80 m)	9 ft 6 in (2.90 m)	27 reps
All values from NFL Combine/Pro Day

=== 2024 season ===
After going unselected in the 2024 NFL draft, Crum was signed by the Denver Broncos as an undrafted free agent. He was also selected by the Birmingham Stallions as the eighth overall selection in the 2024 UFL draft on July 17. Crum made the Broncos' final 53-man roster ahead of the 2024 season.

Prior to the Broncos' wild card matchup versus the Buffalo Bills, Crum was placed on the reserve/non-football injury list.

=== 2025 season ===
In Week 11 against the Kansas City Chiefs, Crum blocked an extra point attempt to keep the game within three points.

On January 17, 2026, in the Broncos' Divisional Round game against the Buffalo Bills, Crum caught a seven-yard touchdown pass from Bo Nix to record both the first reception and the first touchdown of his NFL career.

=== 2026 season ===
On August 30, 2026, Crum was placed on injured reserve with a designation to return to start the season after suffering from a leg injury during the preseason.
