= Christopher Dresang =

American politician

Member of the Wyoming House of Representatives from the 35th district
- member-elect
- Assumed office January 4, 2027
- Preceded by: Tony Locke

Personal details
- Born: Casper, Wyoming
- Party: Republican
- Website: Campaign website

Christopher Dresang is an American politician. A member of the Republican Party, he is the member-elect of the Wyoming House of Representatives for the 35th district. He was elected at the 2026 election. He was a candidate in 2024. He is a school administrator from Casper, Wyoming.
