= Pat Childers =

American politician (1941–2020)

Member of the Wyoming House of Representatives from the 50th district
- In office January 6, 1997 – January 7, 2013
- Preceded by: Joe Reed
- Succeeded by: David Northrup

Personal details
- Born: Charles Patrick Childers; October 27, 1941 Muleshoe, Texas, U.S.
- Died: December 26, 2020 (aged 79) Cody, Wyoming, U.S.
- Party: Republican

Pat Childers (October 27, 1941 – December 26, 2020) was an American politician who served in the Wyoming House of Representatives from the 50th district from 1997 to 2013.

He died on December 26, 2020, in Cody, Wyoming, at age 79.
