= Joe MacGuire =

American politician

Member of the Wyoming House of Representatives from the 35th district
- In office January 10, 2017 – January 2023
- Preceded by: Kendell Kroeker
- Succeeded by: Tony Locke

Personal details
- Party: Republican
- Education: University of Wyoming
- Profession: Businessman

Joe MacGuire is an American politician who served as a Republican member of the Wyoming House of Representatives for District 35.

== Elections ==
=== 2016 ===
Incumbent Republican Representative Kendell Kroeker had been elected to a fourth term in the Wyoming House of Representatives, but abruptly announced his resignation before the start of the next legislative session. Natrona County Commissioners met to choose Kroeker's replacement, narrowing the list to MacGuire, former Casper City Councilman Ed Opella, and pastor Bruce Sell. MacGuire was chosen as Kroeker's successor, and was sworn in on the same day as other new state legislators.

=== 2022 ===
MacGuire was defeated in his attempt at re-election in the 2022 Republican primary.
