= Monte Olsen =

American politician and skier

Member of the Wyoming House of Representatives from the 22nd district
- In office 2003–2008
- Preceded by: Jim Shivler
- Succeeded by: Jim Roscoe

Personal details
- Born: August 8, 1956 Cheyenne, Wyoming, U.S.
- Died: April 8, 2014 (aged 57) Jackson Hole, Wyoming, U.S.
- Party: Republican

Monte Olsen (August 8, 1956 – April 8, 2014) was an American politician and professional skier who served as a member of the Wyoming House of Representatives from 2003 to 2008.

== Early life and education ==
Born in Cheyenne, Wyoming, Olsen graduated from Cheyenne Central High School. He attended Northwest College and University of Wyoming.

== Career ==
He was a professional skier and a ski instructor at the Jackson Hole Mountain Resort. Olsen served in the Wyoming House of Representatives from 2003 to 2008 as a Republican and lived in Daniel, Wyoming.

== Death ==
In 2014, Olsen died of a heart attack in a motel room in Jackson Hole, Wyoming.
