= Liz Storer =

American politician

Member of the Wyoming House of Representatives from the 23rd district
- Incumbent
- Assumed office January 10, 2023
- Preceded by: Andy Schwartz

Personal details
- Born: Cleveland, Ohio, U.S.
- Party: Democratic
- Spouse: Luther Propst
- Education: University of Southern California (BA, MFA)

Elizabeth Storer is an American politician and a Democratic member of the Wyoming House of Representatives representing the 23rd district since January 10, 2023.

== Political career ==
When incumbent Democratic representative Andy Schwartz announced his retirement, Storer declared her candidacy and won the Democratic primary on August 16, 2022, defeating fellow candidate Ryan Sedgeley with 76% of the vote. She then won the general election on November 8, 2022, defeating Republican nominee Paul Vogelheim with 52% of the vote.
