= Ocean Andrew =

American businessman and politician

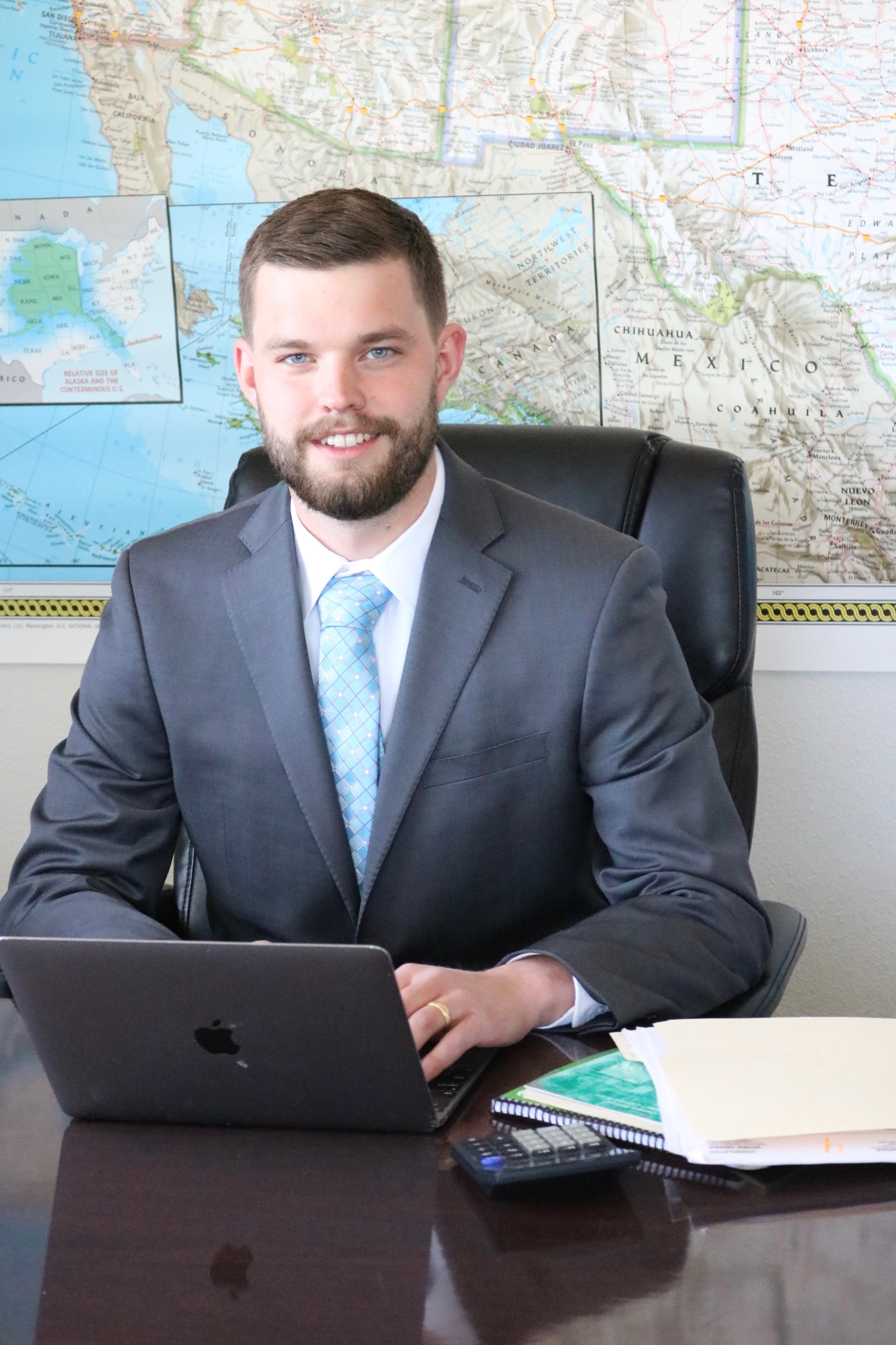
- Andrew in 2025

Member of the Wyoming House of Representatives from the 46th district
- Incumbent
- Assumed office January 4, 2021
- Preceded by: Bill Haley
- Succeeded by: Cam Wright (elect)

Personal details
- Born: Wenatchee, Washington, U.S.
- Party: Republican
- Education: Wenatchee Valley College (AAS); University of Wyoming (BS)
- Occupation: Businessman, Politician

Ocean Andrew is an American businessman and politician serving as a Republican member of the Wyoming House of Representatives from the 46th district. He was first elected in 2020 and serves as House Majority Whip and Chair of the House Education Committee for the 2025–2026 legislative biennium.

== Early life and education ==
Andrew was born in Wenatchee, Washington. He earned an Associate of Arts and Sciences degree from Wenatchee Valley College and a Bachelor of Science degree from the University of Wyoming.

== Business career ==
In 2016, Andrew founded On The Hook Fish and Chips, a mobile restaurant business based in Wyoming. The company began with a single food truck in Laramie and expanded into a multi-state fleet operating in more than 25 states.

On The Hook later established a national franchising program, making it one of the largest restaurant brands originating from Wyoming.

Before starting the business, Andrew worked in commercial fishing in Alaska and held warehouse and equipment jobs in Wyoming, including work as a lift-truck driver at Walmart in Cheyenne.

== Political career ==
=== Wyoming House of Representatives ===
Andrew was elected to the Wyoming House in 2020 and took office on January 4, 2021. His district includes portions of Albany County, and West Laramie.

=== Leadership and committee roles ===
For the 2025–2026 biennium, Andrew serves as:

- House Majority Whip
- Chair of the House Education Committee
- Co-Chair of the Joint Education Committee
- Member, Select Committee on School Finance Recalibration

=== Legislative focus ===
Andrew’s legislative work has focused on:

- School choice programs and expansions of education savings programs
- Charter school governance and flexibility
- Teacher empowerment, including increased classroom autonomy
- Reduction of administrative bureaucracy in K–12 education
- Business regulation simplification, particularly for small and emerging businesses
- Reduction in taxation, including long-term proposals to restructure Wyoming’s property tax system

== Personal life ==
Andrew resides in Laramie, Wyoming, with his wife and children. He is a member of the Lutheran Church–Missouri Synod.

== Electoral history ==
Year	Office	Result
2020	Wyoming House, District 46	Elected
2022	Wyoming House, District 46	Reelected
2024	Wyoming House, District 46	Reelected
