= Joe Webb (politician) =

American politician

Member of the Wyoming House of Representatives from the 19th district
- Incumbent
- Assumed office January 6, 2025
- Preceded by: Jon Conrad
- Succeeded by: Chad Stephens (elect)

Personal details
- Born: Rock Springs, Wyoming
- Party: Republican
- Website: www.joewebbforhd19.com

Joseph (Joe) Webb is an American politician. He serves as a Republican member for the 19th district in the Wyoming House of Representatives since 2025.
