= Sylvia S. Gams =

American politician

Member of the Wyoming House of Representatives
- In office 1989–1996
- Succeeded by: Charles Hessenthaler
- Constituency: Big Horn County (1986-1992); 26th district (1992-1996)

Personal details
- Party: Republican

Sylvia S. Gams is an American Republican politician from Cowley, Wyoming. She served in the Wyoming House of Representatives from 1989 to 1996. From 1989 to 1992, she represented Big Horn County, and from 1993 to 1996, she represented the 26th district.
