= Keith Gingery =

American politician (born 1969)

Member of the Wyoming House of Representatives from the 23rd district
- In office January 2005 – November 2015
- Preceded by: Clarene Law
- Succeeded by: Andy Schwartz

Personal details
- Born: September 13, 1969 (age 56) Frederick, Maryland, U.S.
- Party: Republican
- Education: University of Wyoming (BS); University of Wyoming College of Law (JD)
- Profession: Attorney

Keith Marshall Gingery (born September 13, 1969, in Frederick, Maryland) is an American politician and a Republican member of the Wyoming House of Representatives representing District 23 from January 2005 to his resignation in November 2014.

== Education ==
Gingery earned his BS in political science from the University of Wyoming and his JD from the University of Wyoming College of Law.

== Elections ==
- 2012 Gingery was unopposed for both the August 21, 2012 Republican Primary, winning with 905 votes, and the November 6, 2012 General election, winning with 3,884 votes.
- 2004 When Republican Representative Clarene Law was term limited (since repealed) and left the District 23 seat open, Gingery won the three-way August 17, 2004 Republican Primary by 68 votes with 587 votes (39.1%), and won the November 2, 2004 General election with 2,623 votes against Democratic nominee Mike Gierau.
- 2006 Gingery was unopposed for both the August 22, 2006 Republican Primary, winning with 1,343 votes, and the November 7, 2006 General election, winning with 3,066 votes.
- 2008 Gingery was unopposed for both the August 19, 2008 Republican Primary, winning with 1,182 votes, and the November 4, 2008 General election, winning with 4,131 votes.
- 2010 Gingery was unopposed for both the August 17, 2010 Republican Primary, winning with 1,473 votes, and the November 2, 2010 General election, winning with 3,061 votes.
