= Dorothy A. Perkins =

American politician

Member of the Wyoming House of Representatives
- In office 1983–1998
- Succeeded by: Roy Cohee
- Constituency: Natrona County (1983-1992); 35th district (1993-1998)

Personal details
- Born: August 13, 1926 Weiser, Idaho, U.S.
- Died: December 5, 2010 (aged 84)
- Party: Republican

Dorothy Anderson Perkins (August 13, 1926 – December 5, 2010) was an American politician in the state of Wyoming. She served in the Wyoming House of Representatives as a member of the Republican Party. She represented Natrona County in the legislature from 1983 to 1992 and from 1993 to 1998, she represented the 35th district.
