= Andrew Byron =

American politician

Member of the Wyoming House of Representatives from the 22nd district
- Incumbent
- Assumed office January 10, 2023
- Preceded by: Jim Roscoe

Personal details
- Born: Jackson, Wyoming, U.S.
- Party: Republican
- Education: University of Wyoming (BS)

Andrew Byron is an American politician and a Republican member of the Wyoming House of Representatives representing the 22nd district since January 10, 2023.

== Political career ==
When incumbent independent representative Jim Roscoe announced his retirement, Byron declared his candidacy and won the Republican primary on August 16, 2022 unopposed. He then won the general election on November 8, 2022, defeating independent candidate Bob Strobel with 57% of the vote.
