= Patrick Goggles =

American politician (born 1952)

Member of the Wyoming House of Representatives from the 33rd district
- In office January 2005 – January 5, 2015
- Preceded by: Jim Allen
- Succeeded by: Jim Allen

Personal details
- Born: August 6, 1952 (age 73)
- Party: Democratic
- Spouse: Charlotte
- Children: 4

William Patrick Goggles (born August 6, 1952) is a Democratic former member of the Wyoming House of Representatives. He represented the 33rd district from 2005 until 2015.

== Family ==
Goggles is married to his wife Charlotte and together they have four children. Goggles and his wife currently live in Ethete, Wyoming.

== Religion ==
Goggles is a traditional Native American.

== Education ==
Goggles attended Central Wyoming College in 1986 and later received his BS in political science from the University of Wyoming in 2001.

== Organizations ==
Goggles is currently a member of Leadership Wyoming Alumni and a member of the Northern Arapaho Tribal Housing POW-WOW Committee.
