= Wyoming's 47th House of Representatives district =

American legislative district

Wyoming's 47th State House of Representatives district
- Wyoming's 47th House of Representatives district as of 2022
Representative
Bob Davis; R–Baggs
- Demographics: 81% White; 15% Hispanic; 1% Native American; 3% Multiracial
- Population (2022): 9,572

Wyoming's 47th House of Representatives district is one of 62 districts in the Wyoming House of Representatives. The district encompasses parts of Carbon and Sweetwater counties. It is represented by Republican Representative Bob Davis of Baggs.

In 1992, the state of Wyoming switched from electing state legislators by county to a district-based system.

== List of members representing the district ==
Representative	Party	Term	Note
Teense Willford	Republican	1993 – 2003	Elected in 1992. Re-elected in 1994. Re-elected in 1996. Re-elected in 1998. Re-elected in 2000.
Kurt Bucholz	Republican	2003 – 2006	Elected in 2002. Re-elected in 2004. Died in 2006.
Jeb Steward	Republican	2007 – 2013	Elected in 2006. Re-elected in 2008. Re-elected in 2010.
Jerry Paxton	Republican	2013 – 2023	Elected in 2012. Re-elected in 2014. Re-elected in 2016. Re-elected in 2018. Re-elected in 2020.
Bob Davis	Republican	2023 – present	Elected in 2022. Re-elected in 2024.

== Recent election results ==
=== 2014 ===
House district 47 general election
Party	Candidate	Votes	%
Republican	Jerry Paxton (incumbent)	2,480	98.14%
Write-ins		47	1.85%
Total votes		2,527	100.0%
Invalid or blank votes		533	
Republican hold			

=== 2016 ===
House district 47 general election
Party	Candidate	Votes	%
Republican	Jerry Paxton (incumbent)	3,309	83.94%
Democratic	Ken Casner	612	15.52%
Write-ins		21	0.53%
Total votes		3,942	100.0%
Invalid or blank votes		184	
Republican hold			

=== 2018 ===
House district 47 general election
Party	Candidate	Votes	%
Republican	Jerry Paxton (incumbent)	2,912	98.64%
Write-ins		40	1.35%
Total votes		2,952	100.0%
Invalid or blank votes		459	
Republican hold			

=== 2020 ===
House district 47 general election
Party	Candidate	Votes	%
Republican	Jerry Paxton (incumbent)	3,282	78.16%
Libertarian	Lee Konecny	886	21.10%
Write-ins		31	0.73%
Total votes		4,199	100.0%
Invalid or blank votes		177	
Republican hold			

=== 2022 ===
House district 47 general election
Party	Candidate	Votes	%
Republican	Bob Davis	2,636	79.80%
Democratic	Lee Ann Stephenson	656	19.86%
Write-ins		11	0.33%
Total votes		3,303	100.0%
Invalid or blank votes		90	
Republican hold			

=== 2024 ===
House district 47 general election
Party	Candidate	Votes	%
Republican	Bob Davis (incumbent)	3,488	83.64%
Democratic	James A. Wilson	666	15.97%
Write-ins		16	0.38%
Total votes		4,170	100.0%
Invalid or blank votes		204	
Republican hold			

== Historical district boundaries ==
Map	Description	Apportionment Plan	Notes
	Albany County (part); Carbon County (part)	1992 Apportionment Plan	
	Albany County (part); Carbon County (part)	2002 Apportionment Plan	
	Albany County (part); Carbon County (part); Sweetwater County (part)	2012 Apportionment Plan	
