= Dave Edwards (Wyoming politician) =

American politician

David Richard "Dave" Edwards

Member of the Wyoming House of Representatives from the 6th district
- In office January 1, 2001 – December 31, 2008
- Preceded by: Jim Anderson
- Succeeded by: Richard Cannady

Converse County Commissioner
- In office January 4, 2009 – February 1, 2012

Douglas, Wyoming, City Council member
- In office 1995–2001

Personal details
- Born: January 13, 1938 Cheyenne, Wyoming, U.S.
- Died: January 5, 2013 (aged 74) Douglas, Wyoming, U.S.
- Cause of death: Stroke; Alzheimer's disease
- Resting place: Douglas Park Cemetery in Douglas, Wyoming
- Party: Republican
- Education: Naval Postgraduate School
- Occupation: Retired United States Navy captain; businessman

Military service
- Branch/service: United States Navy
- Battles/wars: Vietnam War, more than 200 combat missions

David Richard Edwards (January 13, 1938 – January 5, 2013) was an American retired United States Navy officer, businessman, and politician.

== Early life ==
Edwards was born in Cheyenne, Wyoming.

== Education ==
Edwards graduated from the Naval Postgraduate School in Monterey, California.

== Career ==
=== Military ===
In the U.S. Navy, Edwards flew more than two hundred combat missions during the Vietnam War. Edwards's military nickname was "Warpaint".

=== Business ===
Edwards bought the LaBonte Hotel, a historical hotel.

=== Politics ===
Edwards moved to Douglas, Wyoming in 1993 and was elected to the city council there. He subsequently served as a commissioner of Converse County. He served in the Wyoming House of Representatives (2001–2008) as the Representative for District 6 as a Republican.

Edwards tendered his letter of resignation on January 6, 2012, to the Converse County Commission after being diagnosed with Alzheimer's disease. He officially stepped down on February 1.

== Personal life ==
On December 26, 2012, Edwards suffered a stroke and died on January 5, 2013, eight days short of his 75th birthday.
