= Cam Wright =

American politician

Member of the Wyoming House of Representatives from the 46th district
- member-elect
- Assumed office January 4, 2027
- Preceded by: Ocean Andrew

Personal details
- Party: Republican
- Website: Campaign website

Cam Wright is an American politician. A member of the Republican Party, he is the member-elect of the Wyoming House of Representatives for the 46th district. He was elected at the 2026 election.
