= Bob Davis (Wyoming politician) =

American politician

Member of the Wyoming House of Representatives from the 47th district
- Incumbent
- Assumed office January 2, 2023
- Preceded by: Jerry Paxton
- Succeeded by: Eamon O'Toole (elect)

Personal details
- Party: Republican

Bob Davis is an American politician. He serves as a Republican member for the 47th district of the Wyoming House of Representatives.
