= Gary Crum =

American politician

Member of the Wyoming Senate from the 10th district
- Incumbent
- Assumed office January 6, 2025
- Preceded by: Dan Furphy

Personal details
- Born: August 12, 1958 (age 68) Rawlins, Wyoming, U.S.
- Party: Republican
- Children: Frank Crum

Gary Crum is an American politician who is member of the Wyoming Senate from the 10th district. A Republican, he was first elected in 2024 to succeed incumbent senator Dan Furphy. Before entering politics, he was a professional gridiron football player and coach, playing for the Wyoming Cowboys and the Miami Dolphins. His son Frank Crum currently plays for the Denver Broncos.

== Electoral history ==
2024 Wyoming Senate District 10 Republican primary
Party	Candidate	Votes	%
Republican	Gary Crum	1,712	59.99%
Republican	Keith Kennedy	1,129	39.56%
Write-in		13	0.46%
Valid ballots		2,854	96.81%
Invalid or blank votes		94	3.19%
Total votes		2,948	100.00%

2024 Wyoming Senate District 10 general election
Party	Candidate	Votes	%
Republican	Gary Crum	6,331	63.44%
Democratic	Mike Selmer	3,405	34.12%
Write-in		30	0.30%
Valid ballots		9,766	97.86%
Invalid or blank votes		213	2.13%
Total votes		9,979	100.00%
