= Patti L. MacMillan =

Wyoming politician

Member of the Wyoming House of Representatives
- In office 1979–1996
- Succeeded by: Tom Rardin
- Constituency: Albany County (1979-1992); 46th district (1993-1996)

Personal details
- Party: Republican.

Patti L. MacMillan is an American politician. She in the Wyoming House of Representatives from 1979 to 1996. Initially, she was elected to represent Albany County, but in 1992, she was elected top represent the 46th district. She was a Republican.
