= Dalton Banks =

American politician

Member of the Wyoming House of Representatives from the 26th district
- Incumbent
- Assumed office January 10, 2023
- Preceded by: Jamie Flitner

Personal details
- Born: Powell, Wyoming, U.S.
- Party: Republican

Dalton Banks is an American politician and a Republican member of the Wyoming House of Representatives representing the 26th district since January 10, 2023.

== Political career ==
When incumbent Republican representative Jamie Flitner announced her retirement, Banks declared his candidacy and won the Republican primary on August 16, 2022, defeating fellow candidates Gary Welch, Timothy Mills, and Tim Beck with 56% of the vote. He then won the general election on November 8, 2022, unopposed.
