= Kurt Bucholz =

American politician

Member of the Wyoming House of Representatives from the 47th district
- In office January 14, 2003 – December 5, 2006
- Preceded by: Teense Willford
- Succeeded by: Jeb Steward

Personal details
- Born: November 5, 1950 Omaha, Nebraska
- Died: December 5, 2006 (aged 56) Saratoga, Wyoming
- Party: Republican

Kurt Bucholz (November 5, 1950 – December 5, 2006) was an American politician who served in the Wyoming House of Representatives from the 47th district from 2003 until his death in 2006.

He died of thymic carcinoma on December 5, 2006, in Saratoga, Wyoming, at age 56.
