= Jim Roscoe =

American politician

Member of the Wyoming House of Representatives from the 22nd district
- In office January 8, 2019 – January 10, 2023
- Preceded by: Marti Halverson
- Succeeded by: Andrew Byron
- In office January 5, 2009 – January 8, 2013
- Preceded by: Monte Olsen
- Succeeded by: Marti Halverson

Personal details
- Born: March 29, 1950 (age 76) Charlotte, North Carolina, U.S.
- Party: Independent
- Other political affiliations: Democratic
- Spouse: Jane Baldwin
- Children: 2

Jim Roscoe (born March 29, 1950) is an American politician and an independent former member of the Wyoming House of Representatives, most recently representing District 22 from January 8, 2019, until January 10, 2023.

== Career ==
Roscoe has served as a general contractor for Roscoe Corporation since 1992. He previously served as a Democratic member of the Wyoming House of Representatives from 2009 until 2013.

== Elections ==
=== 2018 ===
Roscoe challenged incumbent Republican Representative Marti Halverson in the general election, and defeated Halverson with 55.6% of the vote. Roscoe is the first elected Independent member of the Wyoming House of Representatives since 1982.
