= Sandy Newsome =

American politician

Member of the Wyoming House of Representatives from the 24th district
- In office January 8, 2019 – January 2025
- Preceded by: Scott Court
- Succeeded by: Nina Webber

Personal details
- Born: Sterling, Colorado, U.S.
- Party: Republican
- Spouse: Bob
- Children: 1
- Education: Colorado State University
- Profession: Businesswoman

Sandy Newsome is an American politician who served as a Republican member of the Wyoming House of Representatives representing District 24 from January 8, 2019 to January 2025. Prior to her election, Newsome was a member of the Wyoming Board of Tourism from 2011 until 2017.

== Elections ==
=== 2016 ===
After incumbent Republican Representative Sam Krone was charged with embezzlement, Newsome ran for the District 24 seat as an independent, having missed the filing deadline. She placed third in the general election, behind Republican nominee and Representative-elect Scott Court and Democratic nominee Paul Fees.

=== 2018 ===
When incumbent Republican Representative Scott Court declined to run for reelection, Newsome ran as a Republican, and won the primary with 60% of the vote. She defeated Democrat Paul Fees with 72% of the vote.
