= Richard Cannady =

American politician

Member of the Wyoming House of Representatives from the 6th district
- In office January 13, 2009 – January 10, 2017
- Preceded by: Dave Edwards
- Succeeded by: Aaron Clausen

Personal details
- Born: August 18, 1935 Ottawa, Kansas, U.S.
- Died: December 9, 2019 (aged 84)
- Party: Republican

Richard L. Cannady (born August 18, 1935, in Ottawa, Kansas) is an American politician and a former Republican member of the Wyoming House of Representatives representing District 6 from 2009 to 2017.

== Education ==
Cannady graduated from Ottawa High School.

== Elections ==
- 2012 Cannady won the August 21, 2012 Republican Primary with 1,163 votes (61.8%), and was unopposed for the November 6, 2012 General election, winning with 3,458 votes.
- 2008 When Republican Representative Dave Edwards retired and left the District 6 seat open, Cannady won the August 19, 2008 Republican Primary with 881 votes (56.4%), and won the three-way November 4, 2008 General election with 2,091 votes (49.1%) against Democratic nominee Chase Anfinson and Independent candidate Tom Strock.
- 2010 Cannady won the August 17, 2010 Republican Primary with 1,053 votes (46.4%), and was unopposed for the November 2, 2010 General election, winning with 2,774 votes.
