= Scott Court =

American politician

Member of the Wyoming House of Representatives from the 24th district
- In office January 10, 2017 – January 8, 2019
- Preceded by: Sam Krone
- Succeeded by: Sandy Newsome

Personal details
- Born: Scott B. Court
- Party: Republican
- Education: Cody High School; Northwest College; University of Wyoming (BA, MPA); Laramie County Community College
- Profession: Politician, historian

Scott B. Court is an American politician and historian who served in the Wyoming House of Representatives from 2017 to 2019, representing the 24th district as a Republican in the 64th Wyoming Legislature.

== Education ==
Court attended Cody High School, Northwest College, the University of Wyoming, and Laramie County Community College. He received a Bachelor of Arts and a Master of Public Administration from the University of Wyoming.

== Career ==
Prior to serving in the Wyoming Legislature, Court worked for the Buffalo Bill Center of the West and was a precinct committeeman in Cheyenne.

=== 2016 election ===
Court ran for election to the Wyoming House of Representatives in 2016. On August 16, he defeated incumbent Sam Krone in the Republican primary with 72% of the vote after Krone had been charged with felony larceny. On November 8, Court defeated Democrat Paul Fees and independent candidate Sandy Newsome in the general election with 46% of the vote.

Court served in the Wyoming House of Representatives from January 10, 2017 to January 8, 2019. (Note: According to the Wyoming Legislature, Court served from 2017 to 2018.) In 2017, he served on the following committees:

- Transportation, Highways and Military Affairs
- Joint Transportation, Highways and Military Affairs

Court did not seek re-election in 2018.

=== 2020 election ===
In 2020, Court ran for re-election, though was defeated in the August 18 primary by incumbent Sandy Newsome, who had run for the seat as a Republican in 2018 and won. Court received only 16% of the vote to Newsome's 49%.

== Personal life ==
Court currently resides in Cody, Wyoming.

== Electoral history ==
=== 2016 ===
2016 Wyoming House of Representatives District 24 general election
| Party | Candidate | Votes | % |
|---|---|---|---|
| Republican | Scott Court | 2,254 | 46.14 |
| Independent | Sandy Newsome | 1,421 | 29.09 |
| Democratic | Paul Fees | 1,196 | 24.48 |
| Write-in | | 14 | 0.29 |
| Total votes | | 4,885 | 100.0 |
| Republican hold | | | |

Republican primary results
| Party | Candidate | Votes | % |
|---|---|---|---|
| Republican | Scott Court | 1,269 | 67.21 |
| Republican | Sam Krone | 502 | 26.59 |
| Write-in | | 117 | 6.20 |
| Total votes | | 1,888 | 100.0 |

=== 2020 ===
2020 Wyoming House of Representatives District 24 general election
| Party | Candidate | Votes | % |
|---|---|---|---|
| Republican | Sandy Newsome | 4,009 | 92.95 |
| Write-in | | 304 | 7.05 |
| Total votes | | 4,313 | 100.0 |
| Republican hold | | | |

Republican primary results
| Party | Candidate | Votes | % |
|---|---|---|---|
| Republican | Sandy Newsome | 1,239 | 49.30 |
| Republican | Nina Webber | 868 | 34.54 |
| Republican | Scott Court | 404 | 16.08 |
| Write-in | | 2 | 0.08 |
| Total votes | | 2,513 | 100.0 |

== Notes ==
Wyoming House of Representatives
| Preceded by Sam Krone | Member of the Wyoming House of Representatives from the 24th district 2017–2019 | Succeeded by Sandy Newsome |
