= Glenn Moniz =

American politician

Member of the Wyoming Senate from the 10th district
- Incumbent
- Assumed office January 10, 2017
- Preceded by: Phil Nicholas
- Succeeded by: Daniel Furphy

Member of the Wyoming House of Representatives from the 46th district
- In office January 13, 2009 – January 10, 2017
- Preceded by: James Slater
- Succeeded by: Bill Haley

Personal details
- Born: September 8, 1944 (age 81) Laramie, Wyoming, U.S.
- Party: Republican
- Spouse: Sharry Moniz
- Children: 2
- Profession: Businessman

Glenn Moniz (born September 8, 1944) is an American politician and a Republican member of the Wyoming Senate representing District 10 since January 10, 2017.

== Elections ==
=== 2008 ===
When incumbent Republican Representative James Slater retired and left the District 46 seat open, Moniz ran unopposed for the Republican nomination He won the general election with 2,513 votes (48.6%) against Democratic nominee Jim Thompson.

=== 2010 ===
Moniz ran unopposed in both the Republican primary and the general election.

=== 2012 ===
Moniz ran unopposed in the Republican primary, winning with 929 votes. He won the general election with 56% of the vote against Democratic nominee Kennedy Penn-O'Toole.

=== 2014 ===
Moniz ran unopposed in the Republican primary and defeated Democratic candidate Mike Selmer in the general election, winning 54% of the vote.

=== 2016 ===
When incumbent Republican State Senate President Phil Nicholas retired, Moniz ran unopposed in the Republican primary. He defeated Democratic nominee Narina Nunez with 57% of the vote.
