= Patricia J. Nagel =

American politician (1942–2021)

Patricia Jo Nagel (September 24, 1942 – January 30, 2021) was an editor, lawyer, consultant and state legislator in Wyoming. A Republican, she lived in Casper, Wyoming and represented Natrona County in the Wyoming House of Representatives in 1993 and 1995 continuing in office until 2002. She had a husband Bob and two daughters.

She was born in Montana. Her family settled in Casper and she graduated from Natrona County High School and attended the University of Wyoming. Her husband served in the military and she moved with him to Maryland and New Mexico. She graduated from the New Mexico State University in 1965. The Casper Star-Tribune called her a renaissance woman.
