= Tom Walters (American politician) =

American politician

Member of the Wyoming House of Representatives from the 38th district
- In office January 8, 2013 – January 2025
- Preceded by: Bob Brechtel
- Succeeded by: Jayme Lien

Personal details
- Party: Republican
- Spouse: Kade Walters
- Education: University of Wyoming
- Profession: Rancher

Tom Walters is an American politician who served as a Republican member of the Wyoming House of Representatives representing District 38 from January 8, 2013 to January 2025. Walters was a candidate for the Wyoming Senate District 30 seat in 2004 and 2008.

== Education ==
Walters graduated from Kelly Walsh High School in 1994, and earned his BS from the University of Wyoming.

== Elections ==
- 2012 When Republican Representative Bob Brechtel ran for Wyoming Senate and left the House District 38 seat open, Walters won the August 21, 2012 Republican Primary with 958 votes (69.5%), and was unopposed for the November 6, 2012 General election, winning with 3,585 votes.
- 2004 Walters challenged incumbent Senator Charles Scott for the Senate District 30 seat. Walters lost the August 17, 2004 Republican Primary to Scott; Scott won the November 2, 2004 General election.
- 2008 Walters challenged Senator Scott in a rematch in the August 19, 2002 Republican Primary, but again lost to Scott. Scott was unopposed for the November 4, 2008 General election and has held the seat since 1983.

== Personal life ==
Walters is the son of Donald and Betty Walters, he is the oldest of three kids. Walters is married to Kade Walters, he manages a ranch outside of Casper.
