= Charles Hessenthaler =

American politician

Member of the Wyoming House of Representatives from the 26th district
- In office January 14, 1997 – January 14, 2003
- Preceded by: Sylvia S. Gams
- Succeeded by: Elaine Harvey

Personal details
- Born: September 6, 1947 Powell, Wyoming
- Died: June 11, 2023 (aged 75) Billings, Montana
- Party: Republican

Charles Hessenthaler (September 6, 1947 – June 11, 2023) was an American politician who served in the Wyoming House of Representatives from the 26th district from 1997 to 2003.

He died on June 11, 2023, in Billings, Montana, at age 75.
