= Elaine Harvey =

American politician (born 1954)

Member of the Wyoming House of Representatives from the 26th district
- In office January 14, 2003 – January 10, 2017
- Preceded by: Charles Hessenthaler
- Succeeded by: Jamie Flitner

Personal details
- Born: September 18, 1954 (age 72) Lovell, Wyoming, U.S.
- Party: Republican
- Education: Northwest College

Elaine D. Harvey (born September 18, 1954, in Lovell, Wyoming) is an American politician who served as a Republican member of the Wyoming House of Representatives representing District 26 from January 2003 to January 2017.

== Education ==
Harvey graduated from Lovell High School and earned her AS from the Northwest College.

== Elections ==
- 2012 Harvey won the August 21, 2012 Republican Primary with 1,242 votes (62.7%), and was unopposed for the November 6, 2012 General election, winning with 3,446 votes.
- 2002 Harvey challenged incumbent Republican Representative Charles Hessenthaler for the District 26 seat in the August 20, 2002 Republican Primary and won with 1,419 votes (59.7%), and won the November 5, 2002 General election with 2,484 votes (85.6%) against Libertarian candidate Paul Garrison.
- 2004 Harvey was unopposed for both the August 17, 2004 Republican Primary, winning with 1,585 votes, and the November 2, 2004 General election, winning with 3,400 votes.
- 2006 Harvey was unopposed for both the August 22, 2006 Republican Primary, winning with 2,113 votes, and the November 7, 2006 General election, winning with 2,932 votes.
- 2008 Harvey was unopposed for both the August 19, 2008 Republican Primary, winning with 1,545 votes, and the November 4, 2008 General election, winning with 3,425 votes.
- 2010 Harvey was unopposed for both the August 17, 2010 Republican Primary, winning with 2,251 votes, and the November 2, 2010 General election, winning with 2,793 votes.
