= Danny Eyre =

American politician

Member of the Wyoming House of Representatives from the 19th district
- In office January 10, 2017 – January 10, 2023
- Preceded by: Allen Jaggi
- Succeeded by: Jon Conrad

Personal details
- Party: Republican

Danny Eyre is an American politician and a Republican former member of the Wyoming House of Representatives representing District 19 from January 10, 2017 until January 10, 2023.

== Elections ==
=== 2016 ===
When incumbent Republican Representative Allen Jaggi announced his retirement, Eyre declared his candidacy for the seat. Eyre ran unopposed in the Republican primary and defeated Democrat Mel McCreary in the general election with 85% of the vote.

== Personal life ==
Eyre is a member of the Church of Jesus Christ of Latter-day Saints.
