= Phil Nicholas =

American politician (born 1955)

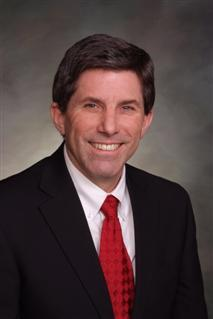

President of the Wyoming Senate
- In office January 13, 2015 – January 10, 2017
- Preceded by: Tony Ross
- Succeeded by: Eli Bebout

Member of the Wyoming Senate from the 10th district
- In office January 2005 – January 2017
- Preceded by: Irene Devin
- Succeeded by: Glenn Moniz

Member of the Wyoming House of Representatives from the 14th district
- In office 1997–2004
- Preceded by: Irene Devin
- Succeeded by: Kermit Brown

Personal details
- Born: March 16, 1955 (age 71) Lander, Wyoming, U.S.
- Party: Republican
- Education: Oregon State University; University of Wyoming

Philip Nicholas (born March 16, 1955) is an American politician who served as a Republican member of the Wyoming Senate for the 10th district, encompassing Albany County.

== Biography ==
Nicholas was born in Lander in Fremont County in central Wyoming. He graduated from Oregon State University in Corvallis, Oregon, with a Bachelor of Science in Microbiology. He received a Juris Doctor from the University of Wyoming College of Law. He works as an attorney for the law firm Nicholas & Tangeman, LLC in Laramie.

He served as a member of the Wyoming House of Representatives from 1997 to 2004 where he represented the 14th district. Since 2005, he has served as a member of the Wyoming Senate. From 2011-2012 he was the Senate Vice President. From 2013-2014, he served as the Senate Majority Floor Leader. From 2015-2016, Senator Nicholas was President of the Senate. Nicholas did not run for re-election to the State Senate in 2016.

He is a member of the Laramie Rotary Club, Co-Chairman of the Laramie Beautification Committee, and an Ex-Officio Member of the Laramie Chamber Business Alliance (formerly the Laramie Economic Development Corporation).

He is married with four children. He is a Roman Catholic.

His younger brother, Bob Nicholas, is a member of the Wyoming House from District 8 in Cheyenne.
