= Tim Stubson =

American politician

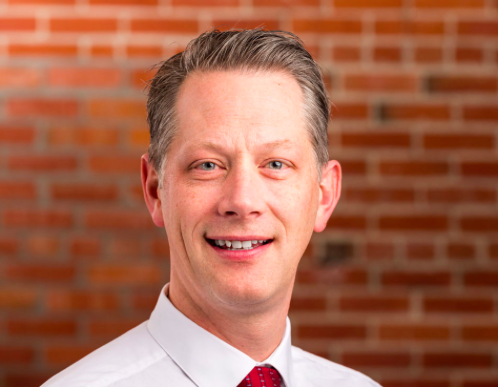

Member of the Wyoming House of Representatives from the 56th district
- In office January 2008 – January 10, 2017
- Preceded by: Tom Walsh
- Succeeded by: Jerry Obermueller

Personal details
- Born: August 9, 1971 (age 55) Casper, Wyoming, U.S.
- Party: Republican
- Spouse: Susan Chapin Stubson
- Children: 2
- Education: University of Wyoming
- Profession: Lawyer
- Website: stubsonforwyoming.com

Tim Stubson (born August 9, 1971, in Casper, Wyoming) is an American politician and a former Republican member of the Wyoming House of Representatives representing District 56 from January 2008, when he was appointed to fill the vacancy caused by the resignation of Representative Tom Walsh, until 2017.

== Education ==
Stubson earned his BA and JD from University of Wyoming.

== Elections ==
- 2012 Stubson was unopposed for both the August 21, 2012 Republican Primary, winning with 908 votes, and the November 6, 2012 General election, winning with 2,796 votes.
- 2008 Stubson was unopposed for both the August 19, 2008 Republican Primary, winning with 782 votes, and the November 4, 2008 General election, winning with 2,883 votes.
- 2010 Stubson was unopposed for the August 17, 2010 Republican Primary, winning with 1,065 votes, and won the November 2, 2010 General election with 1,843 votes (69.0%) against Democratic nominee Pamela Kandt.
