= David Northrup =

American politician (born 1961)

Member of the Wyoming House of Representatives from the 25th district
- In office January 10, 2023 – January 2025
- Preceded by: Dan Laursen
- Succeeded by: Paul Hoeft

Member of the Wyoming House of Representatives from the 50th district
- In office January 8, 2013 – January 4, 2021
- Preceded by: Pat Childers
- Succeeded by: Rachel Rodriguez-Williams

Personal details
- Born: March 6, 1961 (age 65) Laramie, Wyoming, U.S.
- Party: Republican
- Education: Montana Technological University (BS)

David Northrup (born March 6, 1961, in Laramie, Wyoming) is an American politician who served as a Republican Party member of the Wyoming House of Representatives representing the 25th district from January 10, 2023 to January 2025. Northrup represented the 50th district in the Wyoming House of Representatives from 2013 to 2021.

== Education ==
Northrup graduated from Montana Tech of the University of Montana.

== Elections ==
- 2012 Challenging incumbent Republican Representative Pat Childers for the District 50 seat, Northrup won the four-way August 21, 2012 Republican Primary with 613 votes (30.8%) against Childers and two others, and was unopposed for the November 6, 2012 General election.
