= Andy Schwartz =

American politician

Member of the Wyoming House of Representatives from the 23rd district
- In office January 5, 2015 – January 10, 2023
- Preceded by: Keith Gingery
- Succeeded by: Liz Storer

Personal details
- Born: September 26, 1950 (age 76) Washington, D.C., U.S.
- Party: Democratic
- Spouse: Jean Schwartz
- Children: 2
- Education: Oberlin College
- Profession: Small business owner

Andy Schwartz (born September 26, 1950) is an American politician and a Democratic former member of the Wyoming House of Representatives representing District 23 from January 5, 2015 until January 10, 2023.

Schwartz served for 12 years as a Teton County commissioner between 2000 and 2012.

== Elections ==
=== 2014 ===
After incumbent Republican Representative Keith Gingery announced his retirement, Schwartz announced his candidacy and ran unopposed in the Democratic primary. He faced Republican candidate Jim Darwiche in the general election and defeated Darwiche, 56% to 44%. Schwartz's win was one of three Democratic pickups in the state, as Democrats gained seats in the legislature.

=== 2016 ===
Schwartz ran unopposed in both the Democratic primary and the general election.

== Personal life ==
He is Jewish.
