= Dan Furphy =

American politician

- Furphy speaking in 2018

Member of the Wyoming Senate from the 10th district
- In office January 4, 2021 – January 6, 2025
- Preceded by: Glenn Moniz
- Succeeded by: Gary Crum

Member of the Wyoming House of Representatives from the 14th district
- In office January 10, 2017 – January 4, 2021
- Preceded by: Kermit Brown
- Succeeded by: Trey Sherwood

Personal details
- Party: Republican
- Spouse: Kandi Furphy
- Children: 2
- Profession: Businessman (retired)

Dan Furphy is an American politician who served as a member of the Wyoming Senate from the 10th district from 2021 to 2025. A member of the Republican, Furphy previously served as a member of the Wyoming House of Representatives from the 14th district from 2017 to 2021.

One of the most important policies he passed was the creation of a hearing-aid program for low-income Wyoming residents.

== Career ==
Prior to his election to the state legislature, Furphy served as president of the Laramie Chamber Business Alliance. Furphy served on the Laramie City Council from 1999 to 2000.

== Elections ==
=== 2016 ===
When incumbent Republican Speaker of the Wyoming House of Representatives Kermit Brown announced his retirement, Furphy declared his candidacy for the seat. Furphy ran unopposed in the Republican primary and defeated Democrat Erin O'Doherty in the general election with 60% of the vote.
