= Jerry Obermueller =

American politician

Member of the Wyoming House of Representatives from the 56th district
- In office January 10, 2017 – January 2025
- Preceded by: Tim Stubson
- Succeeded by: Elissa Campbell

Personal details
- Born: October 17, 1947 (age 78) Plainview, Texas, U.S.
- Party: Republican
- Spouse: Vickie Obermueller
- Children: 3
- Profession: Certified public accountant

Jerry Obermueller (born October 17, 1947) is an American politician and served as a Republican member of the Wyoming House of Representatives representing District 56 from January 10, 2017 to January 2025.

== Career ==
Prior to his election to the Wyoming House of Representatives, Obermueller was a certified public accountant in Casper.

== Elections ==
=== 2016 ===
When incumbent Republican Representative Tim Stubson retired to run for the U.S. House seat being vacated by Cynthia Lummis, Obermueller announced his candidacy for the seat. He defeated Republicans Donald Bellamy and Ronna Boril in the Republican primary with 51% of the vote, and defeated Democrat Dan Neal in the general election with 60% of the vote.

=== 2018 ===
Obermueller defeated Kris Gaddis in the Republican primary with 75% of the vote.

=== 2024 ===
Obermueller did not run for re-election in 2024.
