= Jim Allen (Wyoming politician) =

American politician (born 1952)

Member of the Wyoming House of Representatives from the 33rd district
- In office January 5, 2015 – January 7, 2019
- Preceded by: Patrick Goggles
- Succeeded by: Andi Clifford
- In office April 2004 – January 11, 2005
- Preceded by: Harry B. Tipton
- Succeeded by: Patrick Goggles

Personal details
- Born: August 1, 1952 (age 74) Lander, Wyoming, U.S.
- Party: Republican
- Spouse: Mary Allen
- Children: 3
- Education: University of Wyoming
- Profession: Rancher

Jim Allen (born August 1, 1952) is an American politician from the state of Wyoming. A Republican, Allen was a member of the Wyoming House of Representatives, representing District 33 from 2015 until 2019, following his defeat in the 2018 state elections.

== Elections ==
=== 2004 ===
Allen was appointed to the Wyoming House of Representatives in April 2004 after incumbent Republican Representative Harry B. Tipton died of leukemia. He then ran for a full term, winning the Republican primary without any opposition. Allen was defeated by Democrat Patrick Goggles in the general election, 56% to 44%.

=== 2012 ===
Allen ran for his former seat, defeating Daniel Cardenas in the Republican primary. He lost to Democratic incumbent Patrick Goggles, 52% to 48%.

=== 2014 ===
After Democratic incumbent Patrick Goggles announced his retirement, Allen announced his candidacy for the seat. He defeated Daniel Cardenas in the Republican primary and defeated Democratic candidate Andrea Clifford in the general election, 53% to 47%.

=== 2016 ===
Allen ran for re-election, and was unopposed in the Republican primary. He faced Democrat Sergio Maldonado in the general election, and defeated Maldonado with 51% of the vote.
