= Jerry Paxton =

American politician

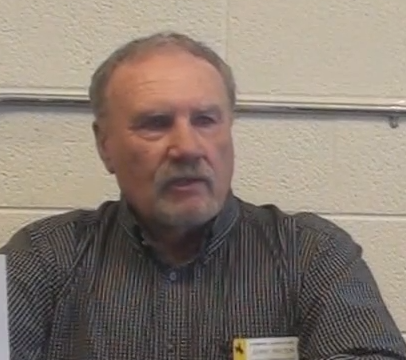
- Paxton in 2018

Member of the Wyoming House of Representatives from the 47th district
- In office January 8, 2013 – January 2023
- Preceded by: Jeb Steward
- Succeeded by: Bob Davis

Personal details
- Party: Republican
- Education: University of Wyoming (BS, MS)
- Website: jerrypaxton.com

Jerry D. Paxton is an American politician who served as a Republican member of the Wyoming House of Representatives representing District 47 from January 8, 2013 to January 2023.

== Education ==
Paxton earned his BS in agricultural education and his MS in vocational education from the University of Wyoming.

== Elections ==
- 2012 When Republican Representative Jeb Steward retired and left the District 47 seat open, Paxton was unopposed for the August 21, 2012 Republican Primary, winning with 1,219 votes, and won the November 6, 2012 General election with 3,019 votes (74.4%) against Libertarian candidate Michael Hendricks.
