= Bob Brechtel =

American politician

Bob Brechtel (born 1949) is an American politician who served as a member of the Wyoming State House of Representatives representing the 38th district. He served in the State House from 2003 to 2012. In 2012, instead of pursuing re-election to the House, Brechtel was defeated in the primary for the Wyoming Senate seat representing the 30th district. He sponsored bills to regulate abortion in the state including one requiring that ultrasounds be performed before an abortion.

Bechtel is a Roman Catholic. He and his wife Leann are the parents of four children.

== Sources ==
- Casper Star-Tribune. 31 January, 2009
- Vote Smart entry on Brechtel
