= Jamie Flitner =

American politician

Member of the Wyoming House of Representatives from the 26th district
- In office January 10, 2017 – January 10, 2023
- Preceded by: Elaine Harvey
- Succeeded by: Dalton Banks

Personal details
- Born: July 10, 1964 (age 62) Buffalo, Wyoming, U.S.
- Party: Republican
- Spouse: Tim Flitner
- Children: 2
- Profession: Rancher

Jamie Flitner (née Moore, born July 10, 1964) is an American politician and a Republican former member of the Wyoming House of Representatives representing District 26 from January 10, 2017 until January 10, 2023.

== Elections ==
=== 2016 ===
When incumbent Republican Representative Elaine Harvey announced her retirement, Flitner declared her candidacy for the seat. Flitner defeated Timothy Mills and Philip Abromats in the Republican primary with 70% of the vote. She defeated Democrat Jean Petty and Constitution Party nominee Joyce Collins in the general election with 66% of the vote.
