= Sam Krone =

American politician

Member of the Wyoming House of Representatives from the 24th district
- In office January 11, 2011 – January 10, 2017
- Preceded by: Colin M. Simpson
- Succeeded by: Scott Court

Personal details
- Born: Cody, Wyoming, U.S.
- Party: Republican
- Education: University of Wyoming (BS, JD)

Samuel P. Krone is an American politician and a former Republican member of the Wyoming House of Representatives. He represented District 24 from January 11, 2011, through January 10, 2017.

Krone was born in Cody, Wyoming.

== Education ==
Krone graduated from Cody High School and earned his BS in finance and JD from the University of Wyoming.

== Elections ==
- 2016 Krone was defeated in the August 16 Republican primary election, losing to Scott Court.
- 2014 Krone defeated Bob Berry in the August 19 Republican primary election, winning with 1,487 votes over Berry's 783 votes. He was unopposed in the general election.
- 2012 Krone was unopposed for both the August 21, 2012 Republican Primary, winning with 1,883 votes, and the November 6, 2012 General election, winning with 4,125 votes.
- 2010 When Republican Representative Colin M. Simpson ran for Governor of Wyoming and left the District 24 seat open, Krone won the three-way August 17, 2010 Republican Primary with 1,459 votes (49.3%), and won the November 2, 2010 General election with 3,227 votes (80.7%) against Libertarian candidate Vernel Gail.

== Texting scandal ==
In December 2015, Krone sent a series of profane and belittling texts to a woman with whom he had a prior relationship, and who was a defendant in a case being prosecuted by the office he worked for. Krone sent the woman several taunting and threatening text messages, admonishing her for supporting a previous political opponent and asking whether she should be tested for sexually transmitted diseases. He told the Cody Enterprise that, though he had been drinking alcohol at the time of the incident, alcohol did not play a role in his texting. Krone told the Enterprise in March 2016: "I'm just not going to drink anymore. Period. I'm just not going to do it."

He confirmed in a March 2016 interview with the Powell Tribune that he was fired as a result of sending the texts, which his boss, Park County Attorney Bryan Skoric, described as "disgusting."

== Criminal theft charges ==
Krone was charged in July 2016 with three felony and four misdemeanor counts of larceny by the Wyoming Attorney General's Office. Charging documents allege that Krone embezzled more than $9,600 from the Park County Bar Association between 2010 and 2013 while he served as treasurer of the organization. During that time, he had sole control and access over the association's bank account, according to the charges filed against him. Krone told the Powell Tribune that he was "innocent until proven guilty."

He made his initial appearance in Park County Circuit Court on August 16, the same day his bond was set at $10,000. Krone, a Republican, suggested that the criminal theft complaint against him by the Republican-appointed Attorney General's Office might be politically motivated, saying the criminal charges were "suspicious," and that "the timing is just completely crazy."

Accused of stealing $9,600 from his local bar association, Krone blamed it on sloppy paperwork. In a plea deal, Krone pled guilty to a reduced one charge of felony larceny and one charge of theft. In what the judge referred to as a very lenient deal, Krone was sentenced to 15 days in jail, 20 days of house arrest and 240 hours of community service. He was later disbarred. (2017)

== Suspension from practicing law ==
The Wyoming Supreme Court on August 24, 2016, issued an order suspending Krone from the practice of law in the state. The order was issued in response to a petition for suspension filed by the Bar Counsel of the Wyoming State Bar, "pursuant to Rule 17 of the Wyoming Rules of Disciplinary Procedure." The opinion did not list a specific reason for the decision, but a statement from the Wyoming State bar noted that Krone's suspension "will remain in place pending the final resolution of formal disciplinary charges against him."

== Reinstatement to the Practice of Law ==
The Wyoming Supreme Court issued an order on January 25, 2023, reinstating Krone's law license. (https://documents.courts.state.wy.us/Opinions/Krone.D-16-0005.Order%20Reinstating%20Attorney%20to%20the%20Practice%20of%20Law.pdf)
