= Kendell Kroeker =

American politician

Member of the Wyoming House of Representatives from the 35th district
- In office January 11, 2011 – December 23, 2016
- Preceded by: Roy Cohee
- Succeeded by: Joe MacGuire

Personal details
- Party: Republican
- Education: University of Colorado Boulder
- Website: kendellkroeker.com

Kendell Kroeker is an American politician and a former Republican member of the Wyoming House of Representatives who represented District 35 from January 11, 2011, until his resignation on December 23, 2016.

== Education ==
Kroeker earned his BS from the University of Colorado Boulder.

== Elections ==
- 2012 Kroeker won the three-way August 21, 2012 Republican Primary, winning by 3 votes with 747 votes (44.0%), and was unopposed for the November 6, 2012 General election, winning with 3,717 votes.
- 2010 When Republican Representative Roy Cohee retired and left the District 35 seat open, Kroeker won the five-way August 17, 2010 Republican Primary with 792 votes (33.2%), and won the November 2, 2010 General election with 2,911 votes (69.4%) against Democratic nominee Jack Walts.
