= Kermit Brown =

American politician

63rd Speaker of the Wyoming House of Representatives
- In office January 13, 2015 – January 10, 2017
- Preceded by: Tom Lubnau
- Succeeded by: Steve Harshman

Member of the Wyoming House of Representatives from the 14th district
- In office January 11, 2005 – January 10, 2017
- Preceded by: Phil Nicholas
- Succeeded by: Dan Furphy

Personal details
- Born: September 21, 1942 (age 83) Denver, Colorado, U.S.
- Party: Republican
- Education: University of Wyoming

Kermit C. Brown (born September 21, 1942) is an American politician and a former Republican member of the Wyoming House of Representatives representing District 14. Brown was the House majority leader from January 7, 2013, to January 13, 2015, and was Speaker of the Wyoming House of Representatives from 2015 to 2017.

== Education ==
Brown earned his BS in animal husbandry and business administration from the University of Wyoming and his JD from the University of Wyoming College of Law.

== Elections ==
- 2012 Brown was unopposed for the August 21, 2012 Republican Primary, winning with 684 votes, and the November 6, 2012 General election, winning with 2,126 votes (56.0%) against Democratic nominee Tim Nyquist.
- 2004 When Republican Representative Phil Nicholas ran for Wyoming Senate and left the District 14 seat open, Brown won the August 17, 2004 Republican Primary with 483 votes (73.6%), and won the November 2, 2004 General election with 2,011 votes (56.6%) against Democratic nominee Joseph Kiovsky.
- 2006 Brown was unopposed for both the August 22, 2006 Republican Primary, winning with 587 votes, and the November 7, 2006 General election, winning with 1,956 votes.
- 2008 Brown was unopposed for the August 19, 2008 Republican Primary, winning with 558 votes, and won the November 4, 2008 General election with 1,966 votes (49.5%) against Democratic nominee Pat Kiovsky.
- 2010 Brown was unopposed for the August 17, 2010 Republican Primary, winning with 855 votes, and won the November 2, 2010 General election with 1,568 (58.5%) votes against Democratic nominee Craig Cook.
