= Aaron Clausen =

American politician

Member of the Wyoming House of Representatives from the 6th district
- In office January 10, 2017 – January 10, 2023
- Preceded by: Richard Cannady
- Succeeded by: Tomi Strock

Personal details
- Born: May 30, 1977 (age 49) Douglas, Wyoming, U.S.
- Party: Republican
- Profession: Rancher

Aaron Clausen (born May 30, 1977) is an American politician and a former Republican member of the Wyoming House of Representatives who represented District 6 from January 10, 2017, to January 2023.

== Elections ==
=== 2016 ===
When incumbent Republican Representative Richard Cannady announced his retirement, Clausen declared his candidacy for the seat. Clausen defeated businessmen Ed Werner and Chris Sorge in the Republican primary with 50% of the vote. Clausen defeated Democrat Shalyn Anderson in the general election with 88% of the vote.

=== 2018 ===
In the August 18, 2020 Republican Primary, Clausen was unopposed and won with 2,044 votes. Clausen was also unopposed for the November 6, 2018 General Election and won with 2,942 votes.

=== 2020 ===
In the August 18, 2020 Republican Primary, Clausen was challenged by Camilla Hicks but defeated her with 1,542 votes (61.8%). Clausen was unopposed for the November 3, 2020 General Election, winning with 4,296 votes.
