= Bill Haley (Wyoming politician) =

American politician

- Haley speaking in 2018

Member of the Wyoming House of Representatives from the 46th district
- In office January 10, 2017 – January 4, 2021
- Preceded by: Glenn Moniz
- Succeeded by: Ocean Andrew

Personal details
- Party: Republican
- Spouse: Vicki Haley
- Education: University of Wyoming
- Profession: Game warden

Bill Haley is a former Wyoming state legislator. A member of the Republican Party, Haley represented the 46th district in the Wyoming House of Representatives from 2017 to 2021.

== Elections ==
=== 2016 ===
When incumbent Republican Representative Glenn Moniz announced his retirement in order to run for the Wyoming Senate, Haley announced his candidacy. Haley ran unopposed in the Republican primary and defeated Democratic candidate Ken Chestek with 58% of the vote.
