= Marti Halverson =

American politician

Member of the Wyoming House of Representatives from the 22nd district
- In office January 8, 2013 – January 8, 2019
- Preceded by: Jim Roscoe
- Succeeded by: Jim Roscoe

Personal details
- Born: 1949 or 1950 (age 75–76) New Britain, Connecticut, U.S.
- Party: Republican
- Education: Bradford College; Northwestern University (BA)

Marti Halverson (born 1959/1960 in New Britain, Connecticut) is an American politician from Etna, Lincoln County, Wyoming, who served as a Republican member of the Wyoming House of Representatives from District 22 from January 8, 2013, until January 8, 2019.

== Elections ==
- 2012: When Democratic Representative Jim Roscoe chose not to seek re-election and left the District 22 seat open, Halverson was unopposed for the August 21, 2012, Republican primary, winning with 925 votes, and won the November 6, 2012, general election with 2,407 votes (49.2%) against Independent candidate Bill Winney, who had sought the seat in 2010.
