= Allen Jaggi =

American politician

Allen Jaggi (born 1944) is an American politician who served as a Republican member of the Wyoming House of Representatives. He represented the 18th district from 2007 to 2013 and the 19th district from 2013 to 2017.

Jaggi was born in Logan, Utah. He earned a bachelor's degree in education and wildlife management at Utah State University in 1968. Prior to entering politics he was a teacher in the Lyman School District.

Jaggi is a member of the Church of Jesus Christ of Latter-day Saints. He and his wife Jane are the parents of four children.

== Sources ==
- Project Vote Smart entry on Jaggi
