= 2022 Wyoming House of Representatives election =

- November 8, 2022

All 62 seats in the Wyoming House of Representatives 32 seats needed for a majority
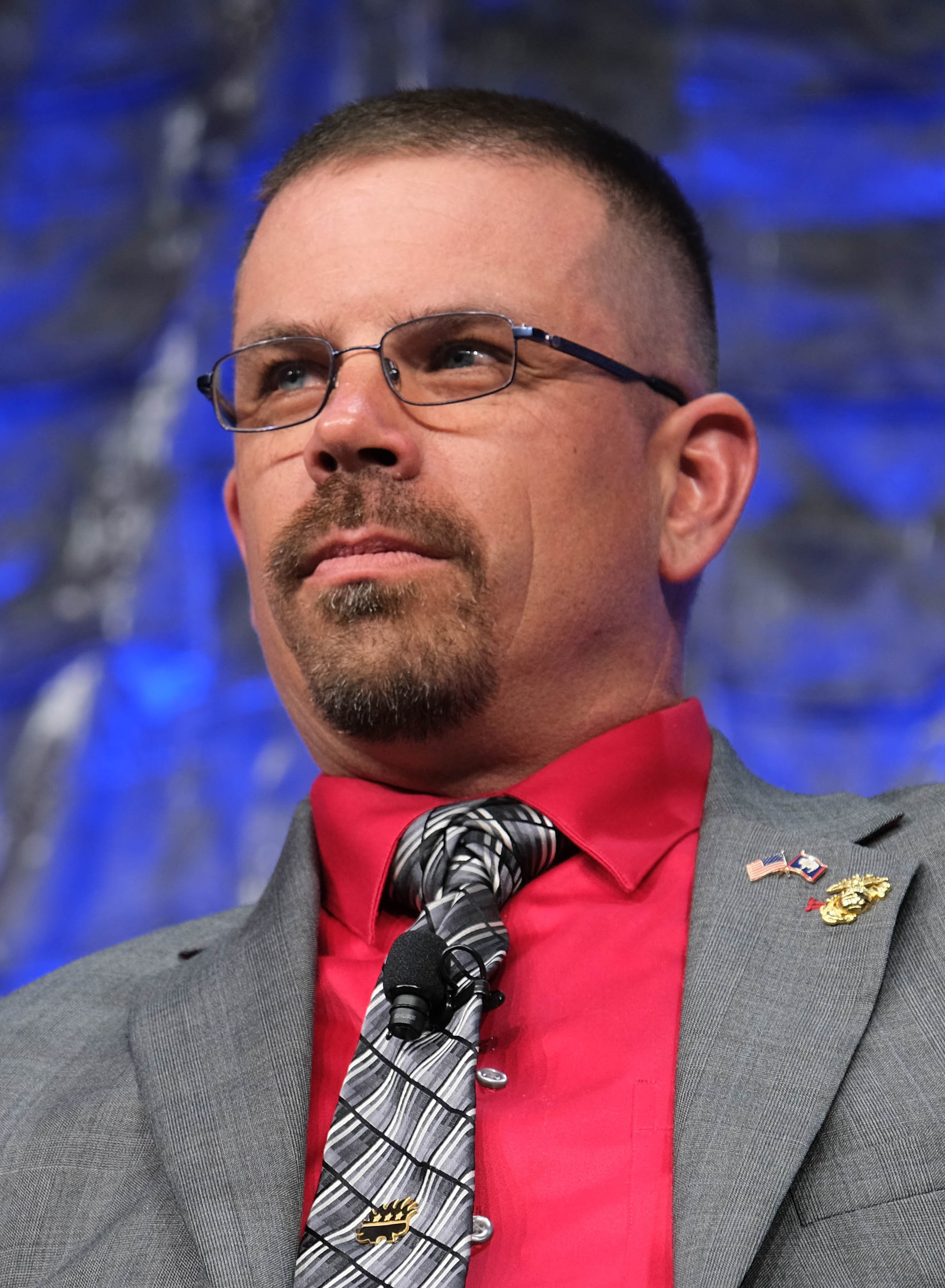

| | Majority party | Minority party |
|---|---|---|
| Leader | Eric Barlow (retired) | Cathy Connolly (retired) |
| Party | Republican | Democratic |
| Leader since | January 12, 2021 | January 10, 2017 |
| Leader's seat | 3rd | 13th |
| Last election | 51 seats, 76.9% | 7 seats, 16.1% |
| Seats before | 51 | 7 |
| Seats won | 57 | 5 |
| Seat change | ▲6 | ▼2 |
| Popular vote | 138,719 | 22,939 |
| Percentage | 76.7% | 12.7% |
| Swing | ▼0.2% | ▼3.4% |
| | Third party | Fourth party |
| Leader | Marshall Burt (defeated) |
| Party | Libertarian | Independent |
| Leader since | February 16, 2022 |
| Leader's seat | 39th |
| Last election | 1 seat, 2.5% | 1 seat, 1.9% |
| Seats before | 1 | 1 |
| Seats won | 0 | 0 |
| Seat change | ▼1 | ▼1 |
| Popular vote | 4,398 | 8,573 |
| Percentage | 2.4% | 4.7% |
| Swing | ▼0.1% | ▲2.8% |
- Results; Republican gain Republican hold Democratic hold
Speaker before election
Eric Barlow
Republican
Elected Speaker
Albert Sommers
Republican

All 62 members of the Wyoming House of Representatives were elected on November 8, 2022, as part of the 2022 Wyoming elections. Primary elections were held on August 16. Republicans expanded their supermajority, gaining six seats.

== Background ==
The election will be the first after redistricting based on the 2020 census. New legislative districts were approved on March 25, 2022. Two seats were added in the redistricting plan enacted by the Wyoming Legislature.

Outgoing composition
| Party | Leader | 2020 % | Seats | | | |
| Party | Leader | 2020 % | 2020 | Now | Up | Needed |
|---|---|---|---|---|---|---|
| Republican | Eric Barlow | 76.9 | 51 | 51 | 51 | Steady |
| Democratic | Cathy Connolly | 16.1 | 7 | 7 | 7 | ▲25 |
| Libertarian | Marshall Burt | 2.5 | 1 | 1 | 1 | ▲31 |
| Independent | —N/a | 1.9 | 1 | 1 | 1 | —N/a |
| Write-in | | 2.6 | | | | |
| Total | | 100% | 60 | | 62 | 32 |

== Predictions ==
| Source | Ranking | As of |
|---|---|---|
| Sabato's Crystal Ball | Safe R | May 19, 2022 |

== Results summary ==
Summary of the November 8, 2022 Wyoming House election results
| Party | Candidates | Votes | % | Seats | | | | |
| Party | Candidates | Votes | % | Before | Up | Won | After | +/– |
|---|---|---|---|---|---|---|---|---|
| Republican | 61 | 138,719 | 76.72% | 51 | 51 | 57 | 57 | ▲6 |
| Democratic | 20 | 22,939 | 12.69% | 7 | 7 | 5 | 5 | ▼2 |
| Independent | 6 | 8,573 | 4.74% | 1 | 1 | 0 | 0 | ▼1 |
| Libertarian | 6 | 4,398 | 2.43% | 1 | 1 | 0 | 0 | ▼1 |
| Constitution | 2 | 531 | 0.29% | 0 | 0 | 0 | 0 | Steady |
| Write-in | | 5,651 | 3.13% | | | | | |
| Total | | 180,811 | 100.00% | 62 | | | | ▲2 |
Source: Wyoming Secretary of State

Popular vote
| Republican | 76.72% |
| Democratic | 12.69% |
| Independent | 4.74% |
| Libertarian | 2.43% |
| Constitution | 0.29% |
| Write-in | 3.13% |

House seats
| Republican | 91.94% |
| Democratic | 8.06% |

=== Close races ===
| District | Winner | Margin |
|---|---|---|
| District 11 | Republican | 6% |
| District 14 | Democratic | 9.3% |
| District 23 | Democratic | 3.4% |
| District 41 | Republican | 7.9% |

=== Incumbents defeated in general ===
==== Democrats ====
- District 17: Chad Banks lost to Republican J. T. Larson.
- District 33: Andi LeBeau lost to Republican Sarah Penn.

==== Libertarian ====
- District 39: Marshall Burt lost to Republican Cody Wylie.

=== Open seats changing parties ===
- District 22: Republican Andrew Byron won the seat held by retiring independent Jim Roscoe.
- District 61: Republican Daniel Singh won the new seat.
- District 62: Republican Forrest Chadwick won the new seat.

== Primary elections ==
Major party (Republican and Democratic) candidates filed for the August 16 primary elections between May 12 and May 27, 2022. Minor parties (Libertarian and Constitution) nominated candidates by convention and submitted their nominations to the secretary of state by August 15. Independents submitted nominating petitions by August 29. The general election candidates list was finalized on September 6; the Democrats made one substitution.

=== Retiring incumbents ===
Seventeen incumbents did not seek re-election.

==== Republicans ====
- District 3: Eric Barlow (speaker; running for state senator)
- District 7: Sue Wilson
- District 19: Danny Eyre
- District 21: Evan Simpson
- District 25: Dan Laursen
- District 26: Jamie Flitner
- District 27: Mike Greear (speaker pro tempore)
- District 29: Mark Kinner
- District 42: Jim Blackburn
- District 47: Jerry Paxton
- District 49: Robert Wharff
- District 52: Bill Fortner
- District 57: Chuck Gray (running for secretary of state)
- District 60: Mark Baker

==== Democrats ====
- District 13: Cathy Connolly (minority leader)
- District 23: Andy Schwartz

==== Independents ====
- District 22: Jim Roscoe

=== Incumbents defeated in primary ===
Seven incumbents were defeated in the primary election.

==== Republicans ====
- District 2: J. D. Williams
- District 5: Shelly Duncan
- District 6: Aaron Clausen
- District 32: Timothy Hallinan
- District 35: Joe MacGuire
- District 44: John Romero-Martinez
- District 58: Pat Sweeney

==== Democrats ====
None of the five Democrats running for re-election faced a primary challenge.

=== Results ===
Percentages may not sum to 100 due to rounding and the inclusion of write-ins.

Republican primary
| District | Candidates | Votes | Percent |
|---|---|---|---|
| 1 | Chip Neiman (inc.) | Unopposed | |
| 2 | Allen Slagle | 1,717 | 50% |
| 2 | J. D. Williams (inc.) | 1,705 | 50% |
| 3 | Abby Angelos | 1,725 | 61% |
| 3 | Rusty Bell | 1,112 | 39% |
| 4 | Jeremy Haroldson (inc.) | Unopposed | |
| 5 | Scott Smith | 1,794 | 54% |
| 5 | Shelly Duncan (inc.) | 1,546 | 46% |
| 6 | Tomi Strock | 1,723 | 51% |
| 6 | Aaron Clausen (inc.) | 1,667 | 49% |
| 7 | Bob Nicholas (inc.) (Note: Redistricted from the 8th district) | 1,514 | 57% |
| 7 | Rick Coppinger | 1,151 | 43% |
| 8 | David Zwonitzer | 1,267 | 35% |
| 8 | Lily Sharpe | 1,021 | 28% |
| 8 | Stephen Johnson | 693 | 19% |
| 8 | Brian Tyrell | 611 | 17% |
| 9 | Landon Brown (inc.) | 1,192 | 53% |
| 9 | Alan Sheldon | 545 | 24% |
| 9 | Dean Petersen | 489 | 22% |
| 10 | John Eklund Jr. (inc.) | 2,134 | 74% |
| 10 | Lars Lone | 743 | 26% |
| 11 | Jared Olsen (inc.) | Unopposed | |
| 12 | Clarence Styvar (inc.) | 831 | 66% |
| 12 | Derek Goldfuss | 412 | 33% |
| 13 | Wayne Pinch | Unopposed | |
| 14 | Bryan Shuster | 1,060 | 52% |
| 14 | Julie McCallister | 936 | 46% |
| 15 | Donald Burkhart (inc.) | Unopposed | |
| 16 | Jim McCollum | Unopposed | |
| 17 | J.T. Larson | Unopposed | |
| 18 | Scott Heiner (inc.) | Unopposed | |
| 19 | Jon Conrad | 1,078 | 44% |
| 19 | Karl Allred | 752 | 30% |
| 19 | Andy Stocks | 638 | 26% |
| 20 | Albert Sommers (inc.) | 2,139 | 58% |
| 20 | Michael Schmid | 1,419 | 38% |
| 20 | Bill Winney | 158 | 4% |
| 21 | Lane Allred | 1,745 | 58% |
| 21 | Jeremiah Hardesty | 1,235 | 41% |
| 22 | Andrew Byron | Unopposed | |
| 23 | Paul Vogelheim | Unopposed | |
| 24 | Sandy Newsome (inc.) | 1,810 | 51% |
| 24 | Nina Webber | 1,727 | 49% |
| 25 | David Northrup | 1,164 | 41% |
| 25 | Chris Good | 663 | 23% |
| 25 | Rex Rich | 536 | 19% |
| 25 | Troy Bray | 470 | 17% |
| 26 | Dalton Banks | 1,178 | 56% |
| 26 | Gary Welch | 510 | 24% |
| 26 | Timothy Mills | 308 | 15% |
| 26 | Tim Beck | 82 | 4% |
| 27 | Martha Lawley | Unopposed | |
| 28 | John Winter (inc.) | Unopposed | |
| 29 | Ken Pendergraft | 1,286 | 50% |
| 29 | Gary Miller | 1,248 | 49% |
| 30 | Mark Jennings (inc.) | Unopposed | |
| 31 | John Bear (inc.) | Unopposed | |
| 32 | Ken Clouston | 1,492 | 58% |
| 32 | Timothy Hallinan (inc.) | 1,079 | 42% |
| 33 | Sarah Penn | 843 | 68% |
| 33 | Valaira Whiteman | 250 | 20% |
| 33 | Wade LeBeau | 138 | 11% |
| 34 | Pepper Ottman (inc.) | Unopposed | |
| 35 | Tony Locke | 1,647 | 57% |
| 35 | Joe MacGuire (inc.) | 1,215 | 42% |
| 36 | Art Washut (inc.) | 1,117 | 60% |
| 36 | Debra Cheatham | 727 | 39% |
| 37 | Steve Harshman (inc.) | 1,780 | 53% |
| 37 | Steve Bray | 1,578 | 47% |
| 38 | Tom Walters (inc.) | Unopposed | |
| 39 | Cody Wylie | Unopposed | |
| 40 | Barry Crago (inc.) | 2,631 | 60% |
| 40 | Richard Tass | 1,721 | 39% |
| 41 | Bill Henderson (inc.) | Unopposed | |
| 42 | Ben Hornok | 1,291 | 54% |
| 42 | Linnaea Sutphin | 1,082 | 45% |
| 43 | Dan Zwonitzer (inc.) | 1,084 | 54% |
| 43 | Clayton Mills | 913 | 45% |
| 44 | Tamara Trujillo | 404 | 41% |
| 44 | John Romero-Martinez (inc.) | 293 | 30% |
| 44 | Michael Reyes | 261 | 27% |
| 45 | No Republican candidates | | |
| 46 | Ocean Andrew (inc.) | 1,816 | 75% |
| 46 | Richard Lennox | 578 | 24% |
| 47 | Bob Davis | 1,447 | 57% |
| 47 | Clyde Johnson | 1,070 | 42% |
| 48 | Clark Stith (inc.) | Unopposed | |
| 49 | Ryan Berger | 1,494 | 66% |
| 49 | Vladimir Allred | 767 | 34% |
| 50 | Rachel Rodriguez-Williams (inc.) | Unopposed | |
| 51 | Cyrus Western (inc.) | 2,010 | 52% |
| 51 | Bryan Miller | 1,874 | 48% |
| 52 | Reuben Tarver | 1,338 | 58% |
| 52 | Ronda Boller | 972 | 42% |
| 53 | Chris Knapp (inc.) | Unopposed | |
| 54 | Lloyd Larsen (inc.) | Unopposed | |
| 55 | Ember Oakley (inc.) | Unopposed | |
| 56 | Jerry Obermueller (inc.) | Unopposed | |
| 57 | Jeanette Ward | 921 | 59% |
| 57 | Thomas Myler | 624 | 40% |
| 58 | Bill Allemand | 1,369 | 63% |
| 58 | Pat Sweeney (inc.) | 806 | 37% |
| 59 | Kevin O'Hearn (inc.) | 1,181 | 65% |
| 59 | John Gudger | 634 | 35% |
| 60 | Tony Niemiec | 1,436 | 75% |
| 60 | Jennifer James | 465 | 24% |
| 61 | Daniel Singh | 618 | 46% |
| 61 | Matthew Malcom | 377 | 28% |
| 61 | Don Odom | 336 | 25% |
| 62 | Forrest Chadwick | 1,312 | 54% |
| 62 | Stan Mitchem | 1,105 | 46% |

Democratic primary
| District | Candidates | Votes | Percent |
|---|---|---|---|
| 1 | No Democratic candidates | | |
| 2 | No Democratic candidates | | |
| 3 | No Democratic candidates | | |
| 4 | No Democratic candidates | | |
| 5 | No Democratic candidates | | |
| 6 | Tania Malone (Note: Malone was substituted by Hank Szramkowski after the primary.) | Unopposed | |
| 7 | Jordan Evans | Unopposed | |
| 8 | No Democratic candidates | | |
| 9 | Stephen Latham | Unopposed | |
| 10 | No Democratic candidates | | |
| 11 | Marguerite Herman | 162 | 64% |
| 11 | James Byrd | 90 | 36% |
| 12 | No Democratic candidates | | |
| 13 | Ken Chestek | Unopposed | |
| 14 | Trey Sherwood (inc.) | Unopposed | |
| 15 | No Democratic candidates | | |
| 16 | Mike Yin (inc.) | Unopposed | |
| 17 | Chad Banks (inc.) | Unopposed | |
| 18 | No Democratic candidates | | |
| 19 | Sarah Butters | Unopposed | |
| 20 | No Democratic candidates | | |
| 21 | No Democratic candidates | | |
| 22 | No Democratic candidates | | |
| 23 | Liz Storer | 168 | 76% |
| 23 | Ryan Sedgeley | 53 | 24% |
| 24 | No Democratic candidates | | |
| 25 | No Democratic candidates | | |
| 26 | No Democratic candidates | | |
| 27 | No Democratic candidates | | |
| 28 | Kimberly Bartlett | Unopposed | |
| 29 | Martha Wright | Unopposed | |
| 30 | No Democratic candidates | | |
| 31 | No Democratic candidates | | |
| 32 | No Democratic candidates | | |
| 33 | Andi LeBeau (inc.) | Unopposed | |
| 34 | No Democratic candidates | | |
| 35 | No Democratic candidates | | |
| 36 | No Democratic candidates | | |
| 37 | No Democratic candidates | | |
| 38 | No Democratic candidates | | |
| 39 | No Democratic candidates | | |
| 40 | No Democratic candidates | | |
| 41 | Jen Solis (write-in) | Unopposed | |
| 42 | No Democratic candidates | | |
| 43 | No Democratic candidates | | |
| 44 | Sara Burlingame | Unopposed | |
| 45 | Karlee Provenza (inc.) | Unopposed | |
| 46 | Merav Ben-David | Unopposed | |
| 47 | Lee Ann Stephenson | Unopposed | |
| 48 | No Democratic candidates | | |
| 49 | Tim Beppler | Unopposed | |
| 50 | No Democratic candidates | | |
| 51 | No Democratic candidates | | |
| 52 | No Democratic candidates | | |
| 53 | No Democratic candidates | | |
| 54 | No Democratic candidates | | |
| 55 | No Democratic candidates | | |
| 56 | No Democratic candidates | | |
| 57 | Robert Johnson | Unopposed | |
| 58 | No Democratic candidates | | |
| 59 | No Democratic candidates | | |
| 60 | No Democratic candidates | | |
| 61 | No Democratic candidates | | |
| 62 | No Democratic candidates | | |

== General election ==
The general election was held on November 8.

=== District 1 ===
2022 Wyoming House of Representatives election, District 1
| Party | Candidate | Votes | % | ±% |
|---|---|---|---|---|
| Republican | Chip Neiman (incumbent) | 3,876 | 97.2 | +6.0 |
| Write-in | | 110 | 2.8 | –6.0 |
| Total votes | | 3,986 | 100% | |
| Republican hold | | | | |

=== District 2 ===
2022 Wyoming House of Representatives election, District 2
| Party | Candidate | Votes | % | ±% |
|---|---|---|---|---|
| Republican | Allen Slagle | 2,927 | 85.3 | –13.1 |
| Write-in | | 504 | 14.7 | +13.1 |
| Total votes | | 3,431 | 100% | |
| Republican hold | | | | |

=== District 3 ===
2022 Wyoming House of Representatives election, District 3
| Party | Candidate | Votes | % | ±% |
|---|---|---|---|---|
| Republican | Abby Angelos | 2,619 | 96.5 | –1.2% |
| Write-in | | 95 | 3.5 | +1.2% |
| Total votes | | 2,714 | 100% | |
| Republican hold | | | | |

=== District 4 ===
Independent Dan Brecht challenged incumbent Republican representative Jeremy Haroldson.

2022 Wyoming House of Representatives election, District 4
| Party | Candidate | Votes | % | ±% |
|---|---|---|---|---|
| Republican | Jeremy Haroldson (incumbent) | 2,539 | 63.3 | –22.6 |
| Independent | Dan Brecht | 1,436 | 35.8 | N/A |
| Write-in | | 36 | 0.9 | –13.2 |
| Total votes | | 4,011 | 100% | |
| Republican hold | | | | |

=== District 5 ===
Republican Scott Smith and independent Todd Peterson ran.

2022 Wyoming House of Representatives election, District 5
| Party | Candidate | Votes | % | ±% |
|---|---|---|---|---|
| Republican | Scott Smith | 2,195 | 57.7 | –39.2 |
| Independent | Todd Peterson | 1,603 | 42.2 | N/A |
| Write-in | | 5 | 0.1 | –3.0 |
| Total votes | | 3,803 | 100% | |
| Republican hold | | | | |

=== District 6 ===
Republican Tomi Strock, Democrat Hank Szramkowski (who was substituted for primary winner Tania Malone), and independent Bruce Jones ran.

2022 Wyoming House of Representatives election, District 6
| Party | Candidate | Votes | % | ±% |
|---|---|---|---|---|
| Republican | Tomi Strock | 2,266 | 63.2 | –35.3 |
| Independent | Bruce Jones | 1,079 | 30.2 | N/A |
| Democratic | Hank Szramkowski | 218 | 6.1 | N/A |
| Write-in | | 5 | 0.1 | –1.4 |
| Total votes | | 3,586 | 100% | |
| Republican hold | | | | |

=== District 7 ===
2022 Wyoming House of Representatives election, District 7
| Party | Candidate | Votes | % | ±% |
|---|---|---|---|---|
| Republican | Bob Nicholas (incumbent) | 2,043 | 60.9 | –36.7 |
| Democratic | Jordan Evans | 1,282 | 38.2 | N/A |
| Write-in | | 31 | 0.9 | –1.5 |
| Total votes | | 3,356 | 100% | |
| Republican hold | | | | |

=== District 8 ===
Independent LCCC Board of Trustees member Brenda Lyttle challenged former Republican representative David Zwonitzer of District 9.

2022 Wyoming House of Representatives election, District 8
| Party | Candidate | Votes | % | ±% |
|---|---|---|---|---|
| Republican | David Zwonitzer | 2,717 | 68.4 | +15.5 |
| Independent | Brenda Lyttle | 1,214 | 30.6 | N/A |
| Write-in | | 42 | 1.1 | +0.8 |
| Total votes | | 3,973 | 100% | |
| Republican hold | | | | |

=== District 9 ===
2022 Wyoming House of Representatives election, District 9
| Party | Candidate | Votes | % | ±% |
|---|---|---|---|---|
| Republican | Landon Brown (incumbent) | 2,014 | 71.2 | –24.8 |
| Democratic | Stephen Latham | 775 | 27.4 | N/A |
| Write-in | | 38 | 1.3 | –2.7 |
| Total votes | | 2,827 | 100% | |
| Republican hold | | | | |

=== District 10 ===
2022 Wyoming House of Representatives election, District 10
| Party | Candidate | Votes | % | ±% |
|---|---|---|---|---|
| Republican | John Eklund Jr. (incumbent) | 3,197 | 97.4 | –0.2 |
| Write-in | | 84 | 2.6 | +0.2 |
| Total votes | | 3,281 | 100% | |
| Republican hold | | | | |

=== District 11 ===
2022 Wyoming House of Representatives election, District 11
| Party | Candidate | Votes | % | ±% |
|---|---|---|---|---|
| Republican | Jared Olsen (incumbent) | 1,145 | 52.6 | –2.4 |
| Democratic | Marguerite Herman | 1,013 | 46.6 | +1.9 |
| Write-in | | 17 | 0.8 | +0.5 |
| Total votes | | 2,175 | 100% | |
| Republican hold | | | | |

=== District 12 ===
2022 Wyoming House of Representatives election, District 12
| Party | Candidate | Votes | % | ±% |
|---|---|---|---|---|
| Republican | Clarence Styvar (incumbent) | 1,377 | 96.1 | +34.9 |
| Write-in | | 56 | 3.9 | +3.6 |
| Total votes | | 1,433 | 100% | |
| Republican hold | | | | |

=== District 13 ===
2022 Wyoming House of Representatives election, District 13
| Party | Candidate | Votes | % | ±% |
|---|---|---|---|---|
| Democratic | Ken Chestek | 1,397 | 59.8 | –32.7 |
| Republican | Wayne Pinch | 933 | 39.9 | N/A |
| Write-in | | 8 | 0.3 | –7.2 |
| Total votes | | 2,338 | 100% | |
| Democratic hold | | | | |

=== District 14 ===
2022 Wyoming House of Representatives election, District 14
| Party | Candidate | Votes | % | ±% |
|---|---|---|---|---|
| Democratic | Trey Sherwood (incumbent) | 1,955 | 54.5 | +3.6 |
| Republican | Bryan Shuster | 1,621 | 45.2 | –3.7 |
| Write-in | | 10 | 0.3 | +0.1 |
| Total votes | | 3,586 | 100% | |
| Democratic hold | | | | |

=== District 15 ===
Libertarian Patrick Gonzales challenged incumbent Republican representative Donald Burkhart.

2022 Wyoming House of Representatives election, District 15
| Party | Candidate | Votes | % | ±% |
|---|---|---|---|---|
| Republican | Donald Burkhart (incumbent) | 1,552 | 71.3 | +7.3 |
| Libertarian | Patrick Gonzales | 602 | 27.7 | N/A |
| Write-in | | 23 | 1.1 | +0.8 |
| Total votes | | 2,177 | 100% | |
| Republican hold | | | | |

=== District 16 ===
2022 Wyoming House of Representatives election, District 16
| Party | Candidate | Votes | % | ±% |
|---|---|---|---|---|
| Democratic | Mike Yin (incumbent) | 2,477 | 73.8 | –22.5 |
| Republican | Jim McCollum | 869 | 25.9 | N/A |
| Write-in | | 9 | 0.3 | –3.4 |
| Total votes | | 3,355 | 100% | |
| Democratic hold | | | | |

=== District 17 ===
2022 Wyoming House of Representatives election, District 17
| Party | Candidate | Votes | % | ±% |
|---|---|---|---|---|
| Republican | J.T. Larson | 1,389 | 60.8 | N/A |
| Democratic | Chad Banks (incumbent) | 895 | 39.2 | –53.3 |
| Write-in | | 2 | 0.1 | –7.4 |
| Total votes | | 2,286 | 100% | |
| Republican gain from Democratic | | | | |

=== District 18 ===
Libertarian Dennis Laughlin challenged incumbent Republican representative Scott Heiner.

2022 Wyoming House of Representatives election, District 18
| Party | Candidate | Votes | % | ±% |
|---|---|---|---|---|
| Republican | Scott Heiner (incumbent) | 2,689 | 81.7 | –14.6 |
| Libertarian | Dennis Laughlin | 590 | 17.9 | N/A |
| Write-in | | 12 | 0.4 | –3.3 |
| Total votes | | 3,291 | 100% | |
| Republican hold | | | | |

=== District 19 ===
2022 Wyoming House of Representatives election, District 19
| Party | Candidate | Votes | % | ±% |
|---|---|---|---|---|
| Republican | Jon Conrad | 1,748 | 57.3 | –39.8 |
| Write-in | | 928 | 30.4 | +27.5 |
| Democratic | Sarah Butters | 374 | 12.3 | N/A |
| Total votes | | 3,050 | 100% | |
| Republican hold | | | | |

=== District 20 ===
2022 Wyoming House of Representatives election, District 20
| Party | Candidate | Votes | % | ±% |
|---|---|---|---|---|
| Republican | Albert Sommers (incumbent) | 3,273 | 92.0 | –6.4 |
| Write-in | | 286 | 8.0 | +6.4 |
| Total votes | | 3,559 | 100% | |
| Republican hold | | | | |

=== District 21 ===
2022 Wyoming House of Representatives election, District 21
| Party | Candidate | Votes | % | ±% |
|---|---|---|---|---|
| Republican | Lane Allred | 3,066 | 96.8 | –1.8 |
| Write-in | | 100 | 3.2 | +1.8 |
| Total votes | | 3,166 | 100% | |
| Republican hold | | | | |

=== District 22 ===
Independent Bob Strobel and Republican Andrew Byron ran to succeed retiring independent Jim Roscoe, who endorsed Strobel.

2022 Wyoming House of Representatives election, District 22
| Party | Candidate | Votes | % | ±% |
|---|---|---|---|---|
| Republican | Andrew Byron | 2,235 | 56.7 | +10.2 |
| Independent | Bob Strobel | 1,681 | 42.7 | –9.8 |
| Write-in | | 25 | 0.6 | –0.5 |
| Total votes | | 3,941 | 100% | |
| Republican gain from Independent | | | | |

=== District 23 ===
2022 Wyoming House of Representatives election, District 23
| Party | Candidate | Votes | % | ±% |
|---|---|---|---|---|
| Democratic | Liz Storer | 2,489 | 51.5 | –43.5 |
| Republican | Paul Vogelheim | 2,326 | 48.1 | N/A |
| Write-in | | 17 | 0.4 | –4.6 |
| Total votes | | 4,832 | 100% | |
| Democratic hold | | | | |

=== District 24 ===
2022 Wyoming House of Representatives election, District 24
| Party | Candidate | Votes | % | ±% |
|---|---|---|---|---|
| Republican | Sandy Newsome (incumbent) | 2,809 | 82.5 | –10.5 |
| Write-in | | 595 | 17.5 | +10.5 |
| Total votes | | 3,404 | 100% | |
| Republican hold | | | | |

=== District 25 ===
2022 Wyoming House of Representatives election, District 25
| Party | Candidate | Votes | % | ±% |
|---|---|---|---|---|
| Republican | David Northrup | 2,585 | 88.4 | –2.2 |
| Write-in | | 340 | 11.6 | +2.2 |
| Total votes | | 2,925 | 100% | |
| Republican hold | | | | |

=== District 26 ===
2022 Wyoming House of Representatives election, District 26
| Party | Candidate | Votes | % | ±% |
|---|---|---|---|---|
| Republican | Dalton Banks | 2,931 | 97.6 | –0.9 |
| Write-in | | 72 | 2.4 | +0.9 |
| Total votes | | 3,003 | 100% | |
| Republican hold | | | | |

=== District 27 ===
2022 Wyoming House of Representatives election, District 27
| Party | Candidate | Votes | % | ±% |
|---|---|---|---|---|
| Republican | Martha Lawley | 3,143 | 99.1 | +0.8 |
| Write-in | | 29 | 0.9 | –0.8 |
| Total votes | | 3,172 | 100% | |
| Republican hold | | | | |

=== District 28 ===
2022 Wyoming House of Representatives election, District 28
| Party | Candidate | Votes | % | ±% |
|---|---|---|---|---|
| Republican | John Winter (incumbent) | 3,139 | 78.3 | –3.3 |
| Democratic | Kimberly Bartlett | 855 | 21.3 | +3.6 |
| Write-in | | 13 | 0.3 | –0.4 |
| Total votes | | 4,007 | 100% | |
| Republican hold | | | | |

=== District 29 ===
2022 Wyoming House of Representatives election, District 29
| Party | Candidate | Votes | % | ±% |
|---|---|---|---|---|
| Republican | Ken Pendergraft | 2,102 | 64.7 | –32.7 |
| Democratic | Martha Wright | 1,134 | 34.9 | N/A |
| Write-in | | 12 | 0.4 | –2.2 |
| Total votes | | 3,248 | 100% | |
| Republican hold | | | | |

=== District 30 ===
2022 Wyoming House of Representatives election, District 30
| Party | Candidate | Votes | % | ±% |
|---|---|---|---|---|
| Republican | Mark Jennings (incumbent) | 2,912 | 95.4 | ±0.0 |
| Write-in | | 140 | 4.6 | +0.1 |
| Total votes | | 3,052 | 100% | |
| Republican hold | | | | |

=== District 31 ===
2022 Wyoming House of Representatives election, District 31
| Party | Candidate | Votes | % | ±% |
|---|---|---|---|---|
| Republican | John Bear (incumbent) | 1,831 | 97.4 | ±0.0 |
| Write-in | | 49 | 2.6 | ±0.0 |
| Total votes | | 1,880 | 100% | |
| Republican hold | | | | |

=== District 32 ===
2022 Wyoming House of Representatives election, District 32
| Party | Candidate | Votes | % | ±% |
|---|---|---|---|---|
| Republican | Ken Clouston | 2,543 | 98.5 | +12.6 |
| Write-in | | 38 | 1.5 | +1.1 |
| Total votes | | 2,581 | 100% | |
| Republican hold | | | | |

=== District 33 ===
2022 Wyoming House of Representatives election, District 33
| Party | Candidate | Votes | % | ±% |
|---|---|---|---|---|
| Republican | Sarah Penn | 1,077 | 55.2 | +12.8 |
| Democratic | Andi LeBeau (incumbent) | 867 | 44.4 | –1.0 |
| Write-in | | 7 | 0.4 | +0.1 |
| Total votes | | 1,951 | 100% | |
| Republican gain from Democratic | | | | |

=== District 34 ===
2022 Wyoming House of Representatives election, District 34
| Party | Candidate | Votes | % | ±% |
|---|---|---|---|---|
| Republican | Pepper Ottman (incumbent) | 3,407 | 98.8 | +0.1 |
| Write-in | | 40 | 1.2 | –0.1 |
| Total votes | | 3,447 | 100% | |
| Republican hold | | | | |

=== District 35 ===
2022 Wyoming House of Representatives election, District 35
| Party | Candidate | Votes | % | ±% |
|---|---|---|---|---|
| Republican | Tony Locke | 2,465 | 95.0 | –2.7 |
| Write-in | | 130 | 5.0 | +2.7 |
| Total votes | | 2,595 | 100% | |
| Republican hold | | | | |

=== District 36 ===
2022 Wyoming House of Representatives election, District 36
| Party | Candidate | Votes | % | ±% |
|---|---|---|---|---|
| Republican | Art Washut (incumbent) | 1,768 | 96.6 | +0.1 |
| Write-in | | 62 | 3.4 | –0.1 |
| Total votes | | 1,830 | 100% | |
| Republican hold | | | | |

=== District 37 ===
2022 Wyoming House of Representatives election, District 37
| Party | Candidate | Votes | % | ±% |
|---|---|---|---|---|
| Republican | Steve Harshman (incumbent) | 2,799 | 93.8 | –2.9 |
| Write-in | | 186 | 6.2 | +2.9 |
| Total votes | | 2,985 | 100% | |
| Republican hold | | | | |

=== District 38 ===
2022 Wyoming House of Representatives election, District 38
| Party | Candidate | Votes | % | ±% |
|---|---|---|---|---|
| Republican | Tom Walters (incumbent) | 2,233 | 96.6 | +21.5 |
| Write-in | | 78 | 3.4 | +3.0 |
| Total votes | | 2,311 | 100% | |
| Republican hold | | | | |

=== District 39 ===
Incumbent Libertarian representative Marshall Burt sought re-election.

2022 Wyoming House of Representatives election, District 39
| Party | Candidate | Votes | % | ±% |
|---|---|---|---|---|
| Republican | Cody Wylie | 1,763 | 74.4 | N/A |
| Libertarian | Marshall Burt (incumbent) | 586 | 24.7 | –28.9 |
| Write-in | | 20 | 0.8 | –0.7 |
| Total votes | | 2,369 | 100% | |
| Republican gain from Libertarian | | | | |

=== District 40 ===
2022 Wyoming House of Representatives election, District 40
| Party | Candidate | Votes | % | ±% |
|---|---|---|---|---|
| Republican | Barry Crago (incumbent) | 4,007 | 96.4 | –1.7 |
| Write-in | | 151 | 3.6 | +1.7 |
| Total votes | | 4,158 | 100% | |
| Republican hold | | | | |

=== District 41 ===
Democrat Jen Solis and Constitution nominee Matt Freeman challenged incumbent Republican representative Bill Henderson.

2022 Wyoming House of Representatives election, District 41
| Party | Candidate | Votes | % | ±% |
|---|---|---|---|---|
| Republican | Bill Henderson (incumbent) | 1,384 | 49.3 | –11.0 |
| Democratic | Jen Solis | 1,163 | 41.4 | +2.0 |
| Constitution | Matt Freeman | 252 | 9.0 | N/A |
| Write-in | | 7 | 0.2 | –0.1 |
| Total votes | | 2,806 | 100% | |
| Republican hold | | | | |

=== District 42 ===
2022 Wyoming House of Representatives election, District 42
| Party | Candidate | Votes | % | ±% |
|---|---|---|---|---|
| Republican | Ben Hornok | 2,414 | 95.0 | +0.2 |
| Write-in | | 128 | 5.0 | –0.2 |
| Total votes | | 2,542 | 100% | |
| Republican hold | | | | |

=== District 43 ===
2022 Wyoming House of Representatives election, District 43
| Party | Candidate | Votes | % | ±% |
|---|---|---|---|---|
| Republican | Dan Zwonitzer (incumbent) | 2,193 | 94.6 | +0.6 |
| Write-in | | 126 | 5.4 | –0.6 |
| Total votes | | 2,319 | 100% | |
| Republican hold | | | | |

=== District 44 ===
2022 Wyoming House of Representatives election, District 44
| Party | Candidate | Votes | % | ±% |
|---|---|---|---|---|
| Republican | Tamara Trujillo | 937 | 59.9 | +9.5 |
| Democratic | Sara Burlingame | 616 | 39.4 | –9.5 |
| Write-in | | 10 | 0.6 | –0.1 |
| Total votes | | 1,563 | 100% | |
| Republican hold | | | | |

=== District 45 ===
2022 Wyoming House of Representatives election, District 45
| Party | Candidate | Votes | % | ±% |
|---|---|---|---|---|
| Democratic | Karlee Provenza (incumbent) | 2,151 | 93.9 | +42.0 |
| Write-in | | 139 | 6.1 | +5.8 |
| Total votes | | 2,290 | 100% | |
| Democratic hold | | | | |

=== District 46 ===
2022 Wyoming House of Representatives election, District 46
| Party | Candidate | Votes | % | ±% |
|---|---|---|---|---|
| Republican | Ocean Andrew (incumbent) | 2,642 | 68.6 | +9.4 |
| Democratic | Merav Ben-David | 1,201 | 31.2 | –9.2 |
| Write-in | | 7 | 0.2 | –0.2 |
| Total votes | | 3,850 | 100% | |
| Republican hold | | | | |

=== District 47 ===
2022 Wyoming House of Representatives election, District 47
| Party | Candidate | Votes | % | ±% |
|---|---|---|---|---|
| Republican | Bob Davis | 2,636 | 79.8 | +1.6 |
| Democratic | Lee Ann Stephenson | 656 | 19.9 | N/A |
| Write-in | | 11 | 0.3 | –0.4 |
| Total votes | | 3,303 | 100% | |
| Republican hold | | | | |

=== District 48 ===
Libertarian Misty Morris challenged incumbent Republican representative Clark Stith.

2022 Wyoming House of Representatives election, District 48
| Party | Candidate | Votes | % | ±% |
|---|---|---|---|---|
| Republican | Clark Stith (incumbent) | 1,530 | 66.9 | –29.8 |
| Libertarian | Misty Morris | 743 | 32.5 | N/A |
| Write-in | | 15 | 0.7 | –2.6 |
| Total votes | | 2,288 | 100% | |
| Republican hold | | | | |

=== District 49 ===
2022 Wyoming House of Representatives election, District 49
| Party | Candidate | Votes | % | ±% |
|---|---|---|---|---|
| Republican | Ryan Berger | 2,060 | 69.9 | –24.9 |
| Democratic | Tim Beppler | 858 | 29.1 | N/A |
| Write-in | | 27 | 0.9 | –4.3 |
| Total votes | | 2,945 | 100% | |
| Republican hold | | | | |

=== District 50 ===
Libertarian Carrie Satterwhite challenged incumbent Republican representative Rachel Rodriguez-Williams.

2022 Wyoming House of Representatives election, District 50
| Party | Candidate | Votes | % | ±% |
|---|---|---|---|---|
| Republican | Rachel Rodriguez-Williams (incumbent) | 3,412 | 82.3 | +4.7 |
| Libertarian | Carrie Satterwhite | 702 | 16.9 | N/A |
| Write-in | | 31 | 0.7 | +0.3 |
| Total votes | | 4,145 | 100% | |
| Republican hold | | | | |

=== District 51 ===
2022 Wyoming House of Representatives election, District 51
| Party | Candidate | Votes | % | ±% |
|---|---|---|---|---|
| Republican | Cyrus Western (incumbent) | 3,631 | 93.1 | –3.8 |
| Write-in | | 269 | 6.9 | +3.8 |
| Total votes | | 3,900 | 100% | |
| Republican hold | | | | |

=== District 52 ===
2022 Wyoming House of Representatives election, District 52
| Party | Candidate | Votes | % | ±% |
|---|---|---|---|---|
| Republican | Reuben Tarver | 2,307 | 98.4 | +1.1 |
| Write-in | | 37 | 1.6 | –1.1 |
| Total votes | | 2,344 | 100% | |
| Republican hold | | | | |

=== District 53 ===
Constitution nominee Larry Williamson challenged incumbent Republican representative Chris Knapp.

2022 Wyoming House of Representatives election, District 53
| Party | Candidate | Votes | % | ±% |
|---|---|---|---|---|
| Republican | Chris Knapp (incumbent) | 1,647 | 84.9 | –10.3 |
| Constitution | Larry Williamson | 279 | 14.4 | N/A |
| Write-in | | 14 | 0.7 | –4.1 |
| Total votes | | 1,940 | 100% | |
| Republican hold | | | | |

=== District 54 ===
Independent candidate Jeff Martin challenged incumbent Republican representative Lloyd Larsen.

2022 Wyoming House of Representatives election, District 54
| Party | Candidate | Votes | % | ±% |
|---|---|---|---|---|
| Republican | Lloyd Larsen (incumbent) | 2,645 | 62.6 | +4.2 |
| Independent | Jeff Martin | 1,560 | 36.9 | N/A |
| Write-in | | 20 | 0.5 | +0.4 |
| Total votes | | 4,225 | 100% | |
| Republican hold | | | | |

=== District 55 ===
Libertarian Bethany Baldes challenged incumbent Republican representative Ember Oakley.

2022 Wyoming House of Representatives election, District 55
| Party | Candidate | Votes | % | ±% |
|---|---|---|---|---|
| Republican | Ember Oakley (incumbent) | 1,798 | 60.2 | +10.0 |
| Libertarian | Bethany Baldes | 1,175 | 39.3 | –10.1 |
| Write-in | | 16 | 0.5 | +0.2 |
| Total votes | | 2,989 | 100% | |
| Republican hold | | | | |

=== District 56 ===
2022 Wyoming House of Representatives election, District 56
| Party | Candidate | Votes | % | ±% |
|---|---|---|---|---|
| Republican | Jerry Obermueller (incumbent) | 1,982 | 97.0 | +0.3 |
| Write-in | | 61 | 3.0 | –0.3 |
| Total votes | | 2,043 | 100% | |
| Republican hold | | | | |

=== District 57 ===
2022 Wyoming House of Representatives election, District 57
| Party | Candidate | Votes | % | ±% |
|---|---|---|---|---|
| Republican | Jeanette Ward | 1,323 | 69.6 | +0.7 |
| Democratic | Robert Johnson | 563 | 29.6 | –1.2 |
| Write-in | | 14 | 0.7 | +0.3 |
| Total votes | | 1,900 | 100% | |
| Republican hold | | | | |

=== District 58 ===
2022 Wyoming House of Representatives election, District 58
| Party | Candidate | Votes | % | ±% |
|---|---|---|---|---|
| Republican | Bill Allemand | 2,024 | 96.9 | +16.6 |
| Write-in | | 64 | 3.1 | +2.5 |
| Total votes | | 2,088 | 100% | |
| Republican hold | | | | |

=== District 59 ===
2022 Wyoming House of Representatives election, District 59
| Party | Candidate | Votes | % | ±% |
|---|---|---|---|---|
| Republican | Kevin O'Hearn (incumbent) | 1,767 | 95.7 | +25.5 |
| Write-in | | 80 | 4.3 | +3.6 |
| Total votes | | 1,847 | 100% | |
| Republican hold | | | | |

=== District 60 ===
2022 Wyoming House of Representatives election, District 60
| Party | Candidate | Votes | % | ±% |
|---|---|---|---|---|
| Republican | Tony Niemiec | 2,178 | 98.2 | +29.4 |
| Write-in | | 40 | 1.8 | +1.6 |
| Total votes | | 2,218 | 100% | |
| Republican hold | | | | |

=== District 61 ===
2022 Wyoming House of Representatives election, District 61
| Party | Candidate | Votes | % |
|---|---|---|---|
| Republican | Daniel Singh | 1,561 | 95.8 |
| Write-in | | 69 | 4.2 |
| Total votes | | 1,630 | 100% |
| Republican win (new seat) | | | |

=== District 62 ===
2022 Wyoming House of Representatives election, District 62
| Party | Candidate | Votes | % |
|---|---|---|---|
| Republican | Forrest Chadwick | 2,518 | 97.6 |
| Write-in | | 61 | 2.4 |
| Total votes | | 2,579 | 100% |
| Republican win (new seat) | | | |
