= 2020 Wyoming House of Representatives election =

- November 3, 2020

All 60 seats in the Wyoming House of Representatives 31 seats needed for a majority
| | Majority party | Minority party |
|---|---|---|
| Leader | Steve Harshman | Cathy Connolly |
| Party | Republican | Democratic |
| Leader since | January 10, 2017 | January 10, 2017 |
| Leader's seat | 37th | 13th |
| Last election | 50 seats, 75.2% | 9 seats, 19.4% |
| Seats before | 50 | 9 |
| Seats won | 51 | 7 |
| Seat change | ▲1 | ▼2 |
| Popular vote | 191,197 | 39,962 |
| Percentage | 76.9% | 16.1% |
| Swing | ▲1.7% | ▼3.3% |
| | Third party | Fourth party |
| Party | Libertarian | Independent |
| Last election | 0 seats, 0.9% | 1 seat, 3.3% |
| Seats before | 0 | 1 |
| Seats won | 1 | 1 |
| Seat change | ▲1 | Steady |
| Popular vote | 6,322 | 4,807 |
| Percentage | 2.5% | 1.9% |
| Swing | ▲1.6% | ▼1.4% |
- Results of the election: Republican gain Republican hold Democratic gain Democratic hold Libertarian gain Independent hold
Speaker before election
Steve Harshman
Republican
Elected Speaker
Eric Barlow
Republican

Members of the Wyoming House of Representatives were elected on November 3, 2020, as part of the 2020 Wyoming elections.

Primary elections were held on August 18, 2020. This election featured the first Libertarian state legislator elected anywhere in the United States since 2000, District 39 Representative Marshall Burt.

== Retirements ==
Eleven incumbents did not run for re-election in 2020. Those incumbents are:

=== Republicans ===
1. District 14: Dan Furphy: Retiring
2. District 31: Scott Clem: Retiring
3. District 34: Tim Salazar: Retiring
4. District 46: Bill Haley: Retiring
5. District 49: Garry Piiparinen: Retiring
6. District 50: David Northrup: Retiring
7. District 55: David Miller: Retiring
8. District 59: Bunky Loucks: Retiring

=== Democrats ===
1. District 17: JoAnn Dayton-Selman: Retiring
2. District 45: Charles Pelkey: Retiring
3. District 60: John Freeman: Retiring

== Incumbents defeated ==
=== In primary elections ===
==== Republicans ====
Five Republicans lost renomination.

1. District 1: Tyler Lindholm lost renomination to Chip Neiman.
2. District 4: Dan Kirkbride lost renomination to Jeremy Haroldson.
3. District 18: Thomas Crank lost renomination to Scott Heiner.
4. District 40: Richard Tass lost renomination to Barry Crago.
5. District 52: William Pownall lost renomination to Bill Fortner.

=== In the general election ===
==== Democrats ====
1. District 39: Stan Blake lost to Marshall Burt.
2. District 44: Sara Burlingame lost to John Romero-Martinez.

== Predictions ==
| Source | Ranking | As of |
|---|---|---|
| The Cook Political Report | Safe R | October 21, 2020 |

== Results summary ==
Summary of the November 3, 2020 Wyoming House election results
| Party | Candidates | Votes | % | Seats | | | | |
| Party | Candidates | Votes | % | Before | Up | Won | After | +/– |
|---|---|---|---|---|---|---|---|---|
| Republican | 55 | 191,197 | 76.85% | 50 | 50 | 51 | 51 | ▲1 |
| Democratic | 21 | 39,962 | 16.06% | 9 | 9 | 7 | 7 | ▼2 |
| Libertarian | 5 | 6,322 | 2.54% | 0 | 0 | 1 | 1 | ▲1 |
| Independent | 3 | 4,807 | 1.93% | 1 | 1 | 1 | 1 | Steady |
| Write-in | | 6,514 | 2.62% | | | | | |
| Total | | 248,802 | 100.00% | 60 | | | | |
Source: Wyoming Elections Results, Secretary of State

Popular vote
| Republican | 76.85% |
| Democratic | 16.06% |
| Libertarian | 2.54% |
| Independent | 1.93% |
| Write-in | 2.62% |

House seats
| Republican | 85.00% |
| Democratic | 11.67% |
| Libertarian | 1.67% |
| Independent | 1.67% |

== Close races ==
| District | Winner | Margin |
|---|---|---|
| District 55 | Republican | 0.8% |
| District 44 | Republican (flip) | 1.5% |
| District 14 | Democratic (flip) | 2.0% |
| District 33 | Democratic | 3.0% |
| District 45 | Democratic | 4.1% |
| District 8 | Republican | 6.0% |
| District 22 | Independent | 7.01% |
| District 39 | Libertarian (flip) | 8.7% |
| District 11 | Republican | 10.3% |
| District 54 | Republican | 16.8% |
| District 60 | Republican (flip) | 37.8% |

== Summary of results by State House District ==
| District | Democratic | | Republican | | Others | | Write-in | | Total | | Result |
| District | Votes | % | Votes | % | Votes | % | Votes | % | Votes | % | Result |
|---|---|---|---|---|---|---|---|---|---|---|---|
| District 1 | – | – | 4,706 | 91.20% | – | – | 454 | 8.80% | 5,160 | 100.00% | Republican Hold |
| District 2 | – | – | 4,121 | 98.45% | – | – | 65 | 1.55% | 4,186 | 100.00% | Republican Hold |
| District 3 | – | – | 4,016 | 97.69% | – | – | 95 | 2.31% | 4,111 | 100.00% | Republican Hold |
| District 4 | – | – | 4,227 | 85.90% | – | – | 694 | 14.10% | 4,921 | 100.00% | Republican Hold |
| District 5 | – | – | 4,122 | 96.87% | – | – | 133 | 3.13% | 4,255 | 100.00% | Republican Hold |
| District 6 | – | – | 4,296 | 98.51% | – | – | 65 | 1.49% | 4,361 | 100.00% | Republican Hold |
| District 7 | – | – | 5,804 | 97.58% | – | – | 144 | 2.42% | 5,948 | 100.00% | Republican Hold |
| District 8 | 2,259 | 46.88% | 2,547 | 52.85% | – | – | 13 | 0.27% | 4,819 | 100.00% | Republican Hold |
| District 9 | – | – | 3,798 | 95.98% | – | – | 159 | 4.02% | 3,957 | 100.00% | Republican Hold |
| District 10 | – | – | 5,565 | 97.65% | – | – | 134 | 2.35% | 5,699 | 100.00% | Republican Hold |
| District 11 | 1,470 | 44.71% | 1,807 | 54.96% | – | – | 11 | 0.33% | 3,288 | 100.00% | Republican Hold |
| District 12 | 1,463 | 38.47% | 2,327 | 61.19% | – | – | 13 | 0.34% | 3,803 | 100.00% | Republican Hold |
| District 13 | 3,004 | 92.46% | – | – | – | – | 245 | 7.54% | 3,249 | 100.00% | Democratic Hold |
| District 14 | 2,148 | 50.89% | 2,063 | 48.87% | – | – | 10 | 0.24% | 4,221 | 100.00% | Democratic GAIN |
| District 15 | 1,144 | 35.67% | 2,052 | 63.99% | – | – | 11 | 0.34% | 3,207 | 100.00% | Republican Hold |
| District 16 | 4,237 | 96.19% | – | – | – | – | 168 | 3.81% | 4,405 | 100.00% | Democratic Hold |
| District 17 | 1,822 | 92.49% | – | – | – | – | 148 | 7.51% | 1,970 | 100.00% | Democratic Hold |
| District 18 | – | – | 3,981 | 96.28% | – | – | 154 | 3.72% | 4,135 | 100.00% | Republican Hold |
| District 19 | – | – | 3,915 | 97.07% | – | – | 118 | 2.93% | 4,033 | 100.00% | Republican Hold |
| District 20 | – | – | 3,939 | 98.38% | – | – | 65 | 1.62% | 4,004 | 100.00% | Republican Hold |
| District 21 | – | – | 4,705 | 98.64% | – | – | 65 | 1.36% | 4,770 | 100.00% | Republican Hold |
| District 22 | – | – | 2,825 | 46.46% | 3,191 | 52.47% | 65 | 1.07% | 6,081 | 100.00% | Independent Hold |
| District 23 | 4,885 | 95.02% | – | – | – | – | 256 | 4.98% | 5,141 | 100.00% | Democratic Hold |
| District 24 | – | – | 4,009 | 92.95% | – | – | 304 | 7.05% | 4,313 | 100.00% | Republican Hold |
| District 25 | – | – | 3,722 | 90.56% | – | – | 388 | 9.44% | 4,110 | 100.00% | Republican Hold |
| District 26 | – | – | 3,959 | 98.46% | – | – | 62 | 1.54% | 4,021 | 100.00% | Republican Hold |
| District 27 | – | – | 3,763 | 98.25% | – | – | 67 | 1.75% | 3,830 | 100.00% | Republican Hold |
| District 28 | 816 | 17.67% | 3,769 | 81.60% | – | – | 34 | 0.74% | 4,619 | 100.00% | Republican Hold |
| District 29 | – | – | 3,766 | 97.44% | – | – | 99 | 2.56% | 3,865 | 100.00% | Republican Hold |
| District 30 | – | – | 3,985 | 95.40% | – | – | 192 | 4.60% | 4,177 | 100.00% | Republican Hold |
| District 31 | – | – | 3,866 | 97.40% | – | – | 103 | 2.60% | 3,969 | 100.00% | Republican Hold |
| District 32 | 632 | 13.64% | 3,980 | 85.92% | – | – | 20 | 0.43% | 4,632 | 100.00% | Republican Hold |
| District 33 | 1,434 | 45.41% | 1,338 | 42.37% | 375 | 11.87% | 11 | 0.35% | 3,158 | 100.00% | Democratic Hold |
| District 34 | – | – | 4,070 | 98.71% | – | – | 53 | 1.29% | 4,123 | 100.00% | Republican Hold |
| District 35 | – | – | 5,046 | 97.71% | – | – | 118 | 2.29% | 5,164 | 100.00% | Republican Hold |
| District 36 | – | – | 3,041 | 96.54% | – | – | 109 | 3.46% | 3,150 | 100.00% | Republican Hold |
| District 37 | – | – | 4,335 | 96.66% | – | – | 150 | 3.34% | 4,485 | 100.00% | Republican Hold |
| District 38 | – | – | 3,277 | 75.09% | 1,068 | 24.47% | 19 | 0.44% | 4,364 | 100.00% | Republican Hold |
| District 39 | 1,421 | 44.91% | – | – | 1,696 | 53.60% | 47 | 1.49% | 3,164 | 100.00% | Libertarian GAIN |
| District 40 | – | – | 4,489 | 98.14% | – | – | 85 | 1.86% | 4,574 | 100.00% | Republican Hold |
| District 41 | 1,629 | 39.36% | 2,497 | 60.33% | – | – | 13 | 0.31% | 4,139 | 100.00% | Republican Hold |
| District 42 | – | – | 3,918 | 94.78% | – | – | 216 | 5.22% | 4,134 | 100.00% | Republican Hold |
| District 43 | – | – | 2,918 | 94.04% | – | – | 185 | 5.96% | 3,103 | 100.00% | Republican Hold |
| District 44 | 1,504 | 48.86% | 1,552 | 50.42% | – | – | 22 | 0.71% | 3,078 | 100.00% | Republican GAIN |
| District 45 | 2,043 | 51.87% | 1,883 | 47.80% | – | – | 13 | 0.33% | 3,939 | 100.00% | Democratic Hold |
| District 46 | 2,323 | 40.37% | 3,409 | 59.25% | – | – | 22 | 0.38% | 5,754 | 100.00% | Republican Hold |
| District 47 | – | – | 3,282 | 78.16% | 886 | 21.10% | 31 | 0.74% | 4,199 | 100.00% | Republican Hold |
| District 48 | – | – | 2,573 | 96.66% | – | – | 89 | 3.34% | 2,662 | 100.00% | Republican Hold |
| District 49 | – | – | 3,269 | 94.84% | – | – | 178 | 5.16% | 3,447 | 100.00% | Republican Hold |
| District 50 | – | – | 4,373 | 77.62% | 1,241 | 22.03% | 20 | 0.35% | 5,634 | 100.00% | Republican Hold |
| District 51 | – | – | 5,619 | 96.88% | – | – | 181 | 3.12% | 5,800 | 100.00% | Republican Hold |
| District 52 | – | – | 3,368 | 97.34% | – | – | 92 | 2.66% | 3,460 | 100.00% | Republican Hold |
| District 53 | – | – | 2,303 | 95.17% | – | – | 117 | 4.83% | 2,420 | 100.00% | Republican Hold |
| District 54 | 2,244 | 41.59% | 3,148 | 58.35% | – | – | 3 | 0.06% | 5,395 | 100.00% | Republican Hold |
| District 55 | – | – | 2,058 | 50.22% | 2,026 | 49.44% | 14 | 0.34% | 4,098 | 100.00% | Republican Hold |
| District 56 | – | – | 3,116 | 96.68% | – | – | 107 | 3.32% | 3,223 | 100.00% | Republican Hold |
| District 57 | 1,120 | 30.81% | 2,504 | 68.89% | – | – | 11 | 0.30% | 3,635 | 100.00% | Republican Hold |
| District 58 | – | – | 2,725 | 80.34% | 646 | 19.04% | 21 | 0.62% | 3,392 | 100.00% | Republican Hold |
| District 59 | 1,104 | 29.14% | 2,658 | 70.17% | – | – | 26 | 0.69% | 3,788 | 100.00% | Republican Hold |
| District 60 | 1,260 | 31.03% | 2,793 | 68.79% | – | – | 7 | 0.17% | 4,060 | 100.00% | Republican GAIN |
| Total | 39,962 | 16.06% | 191,197 | 76.85% | 11,129 | 4.47% | 6,514 | 2.62% | 248,802 | 100.00% | |

== Elected members ==
| State House District | Incumbent | Party | Elected | Party |
|---|---|---|---|---|
| 1 | Tyler Lindholm* | Rep | Chip Neiman | Rep |
| 2 | Hans Hunt | Rep | Hans Hunt | Rep |
| 3 | Eric Barlow | Rep | Eric Barlow | Rep |
| 4 | Dan Kirkbride* | Rep | Jeremy Haroldson | Rep |
| 5 | Shelly Duncan | Rep | Shelly Duncan | Rep |
| 6 | Aaron Clausen | Rep | Aaron Clausen | Rep |
| 7 | Sue Wilson | Rep | Sue Wilson | Rep |
| 8 | Bob Nicholas | Rep | Bob Nicholas | Rep |
| 9 | Landon Brown | Rep | Landon Brown | Rep |
| 10 | John Eklund Jr. | Rep | John Eklund Jr. | Rep |
| 11 | Jared Olsen | Rep | Jared Olsen | Rep |
| 12 | Clarence Styvar | Rep | Clarence Styvar | Rep |
| 13 | Cathy Connolly | Dem | Cathy Connolly | Dem |
| 14 | Dan Furphy | Rep | Trey Sherwood | Dem |
| 15 | Donald Burkhart | Rep | Donald Burkhart | Rep |
| 16 | Mike Yin | Dem | Mike Yin | Dem |
| 17 | JoAnn Dayton-Selman | Dem | Chad Banks | Dem |
| 18 | Thomas Crank* | Rep | Scott Heiner | Rep |
| 19 | Danny Eyre | Rep | Danny Eyre | Rep |
| 20 | Albert Sommers | Rep | Albert Sommers | Rep |
| 21 | Evan Simpson | Rep | Evan Simpson | Rep |
| 22 | Jim Roscoe | Ind | Jim Roscoe | Ind |
| 23 | Andy Schwartz | Dem | Andy Schwartz | Dem |
| 24 | Sandy Newsome | Rep | Sandy Newsome | Rep |
| 25 | Dan Laursen | Rep | Dan Laursen | Rep |
| 26 | Jamie Flitner | Rep | Jamie Flitner | Rep |
| 27 | Mike Greear | Rep | Mike Greear | Rep |
| 28 | John Winter | Rep | John Winter | Rep |
| 29 | Mark Kinner | Rep | Mark Kinner | Rep |
| 30 | Mark Jennings | Rep | Mark Jennings | Rep |
| 31 | Scott Clem | Rep | John Bear | Rep |
| 32 | Timothy Hallinan | Rep | Timothy Hallinan | Rep |
| 33 | Andi Clifford | Dem | Andi Clifford | Dem |
| 34 | Tim Salazar | Rep | Pepper Ottman | Rep |
| 35 | Joe MacGuire | Rep | Joe MacGuire | Rep |
| 36 | Art Washut | Rep | Art Washut | Rep |
| 37 | Steve Harshman | Rep | Steve Harshman | Rep |
| 38 | Tom Walters | Rep | Tom Walters | Rep |
| 39 | Stan Blake | Dem | Marshall Burt | Lib |
| 40 | Richard Tass* | Rep | Barry Crago | Rep |
| 41 | Bill Henderson | Rep | Bill Henderson | Rep |
| 42 | Jim Blackburn | Rep | Jim Blackburn | Rep |
| 43 | Dan Zwonitzer | Rep | Dan Zwonitzer | Rep |
| 44 | Sara Burlingame | Dem | John Romero-Martinez | Rep |
| 45 | Charles Pelkey | Dem | Karlee Provenza | Dem |
| 46 | Bill Haley | Rep | Ocean Andrew | Rep |
| 47 | Jerry Paxton | Rep | Jerry Paxton | Rep |
| 48 | Clark Stith | Rep | Clark Stith | Rep |
| 49 | Garry Piiparinen | Rep | Robert Wharff | Rep |
| 50 | David Northrup | Rep | Rachel Rodriguez-Williams | Rep |
| 51 | Cyrus Western | Rep | Cyrus Western | Rep |
| 52 | William Pownall* | Rep | Bill Fortner | Rep |
| 53 | Roy Edwards | Rep | Roy Edwards (Note: Edwards died on November 2, 2020, a day before the general election. Chris Knapp was appointed to fill the vacancy left by Edwards' death.) | Rep |
| 54 | Lloyd Larsen | Rep | Lloyd Larsen | Rep |
| 55 | David Miller | Rep | Ember Oakley | Rep |
| 56 | Jerry Obermueller | Rep | Jerry Obermueller | Rep |
| 57 | Chuck Gray | Rep | Chuck Gray | Rep |
| 58 | Pat Sweeney | Rep | Pat Sweeney | Rep |
| 59 | Bunky Loucks | Rep | Kevin O'Hearn | Rep |
| 60 | John Freeman | Dem | Mark Baker | Rep |

== Detailed results by State House District ==
=== District 1 ===
Wyoming's 1st State House District General Election, 2020
| Party | Candidate | Votes | % | ±% |
|---|---|---|---|---|
| Republican | Chip Neiman | 4,706 | 91.2% | –7.1 |
| Write-in | | 454 | 8.8% | +7.1 |
| Total votes | | 5,160 | 100.0% | |
| Republican hold | | | | |

=== District 2 ===
Wyoming's 2nd State House District General Election, 2020
| Party | Candidate | Votes | % | ±% |
|---|---|---|---|---|
| Republican | Hans Hunt (incumbent) | 4,121 | 98.4% | +0.1 |
| Write-in | | 65 | 1.6% | –0.1 |
| Total votes | | 4,186 | 100.0% | |
| Republican hold | | | | |

=== District 3 ===
Wyoming's 3rd State House District General Election, 2020
| Party | Candidate | Votes | % | ±% |
|---|---|---|---|---|
| Republican | Eric Barlow (incumbent) | 4,016 | 97.7% | –1.5 |
| Write-in | | 95 | 2.3% | +1.5 |
| Total votes | | 4,111 | 100.0% | |
| Republican hold | | | | |

=== District 4 ===
Wyoming's 4th State House District General Election, 2020
| Party | Candidate | Votes | % | ±% |
|---|---|---|---|---|
| Republican | Jeremy Haroldson | 4,227 | 85.9% | –12.1 |
| Write-in | | 694 | 14.1% | +12.1 |
| Total votes | | 4,921 | 100.0% | |
| Republican hold | | | | |

=== District 5 ===
Wyoming's 5th State House District General Election, 2020
| Party | Candidate | Votes | % | ±% |
|---|---|---|---|---|
| Republican | Shelly Duncan (incumbent) | 4,122 | 96.9% | +20.2 |
| Write-in | | 133 | 3.1% | +2.0 |
| Total votes | | 4,255 | 100.0% | |
| Republican hold | | | | |

=== District 6 ===
Wyoming's 6th State House District General Election, 2020
| Party | Candidate | Votes | % | ±% |
|---|---|---|---|---|
| Republican | Aaron Clausen (incumbent) | 4,296 | 98.5% | –0.7 |
| Write-in | | 65 | 1.5% | +0.7 |
| Total votes | | 4,361 | 100.0% | |
| Republican hold | | | | |

=== District 7 ===
Wyoming's 7th State House District General Election, 2020
| Party | Candidate | Votes | % | ±% |
|---|---|---|---|---|
| Republican | Sue Wilson (incumbent) | 5,804 | 97.6% | –0.9 |
| Write-in | | 144 | 2.4% | +0.9 |
| Total votes | | 5,948 | 100.0% | |
| Republican hold | | | | |

=== District 8 ===
Wyoming's 8th State House District General Election, 2020
| Party | Candidate | Votes | % | ±% |
|---|---|---|---|---|
| Republican | Bob Nicholas (incumbent) | 2,547 | 52.9% | –4.8 |
| Democratic | Marcie Kindred | 2,259 | 46.9% | +4.9 |
| Write-in | | 13 | 0.3% | ±0.0 |
| Total votes | | 4,819 | 100.0% | |
| Republican hold | | | | |

=== District 9 ===
Wyoming's 9th State House District General Election, 2020
| Party | Candidate | Votes | % | ±% |
|---|---|---|---|---|
| Republican | Landon Brown (incumbent) | 3,798 | 96.0% | –2.7 |
| Write-in | | 159 | 4.0% | +2.7 |
| Total votes | | 3,957 | 100.0% | |
| Republican hold | | | | |

=== District 10 ===
Wyoming's 10th State House District General Election, 2020
| Party | Candidate | Votes | % | ±% |
|---|---|---|---|---|
| Republican | John Eklund Jr. (incumbent) | 5,565 | 97.6% | +16.7 |
| Write-in | | 134 | 2.4% | +2.1 |
| Total votes | | 5,699 | 100.0% | |
| Republican hold | | | | |

=== District 11 ===
Wyoming's 11th State House District General Election, 2020
| Party | Candidate | Votes | % | ±% |
|---|---|---|---|---|
| Republican | Jared Olsen (incumbent) | 1,807 | 55.0% | +1.4 |
| Democratic | Amy Spieker | 1,470 | 44.7% | –1.5 |
| Write-in | | 11 | 0.3% | +0.1 |
| Total votes | | 3,288 | 100.0% | |
| Republican hold | | | | |

=== District 12 ===
Wyoming's 12th State House District General Election, 2020
| Party | Candidate | Votes | % | ±% |
|---|---|---|---|---|
| Republican | Clarence Styvar (incumbent) | 2,327 | 61.2% | +5.3 |
| Democratic | Lee Filer | 1,463 | 38.5% | –5.3 |
| Write-in | | 13 | 0.3% | ±0.0 |
| Total votes | | 3,803 | 100.0% | |
| Republican hold | | | | |

=== District 13 ===
Wyoming's 13th State House District General Election, 2020
| Party | Candidate | Votes | % | ±% |
|---|---|---|---|---|
| Democratic | Cathy Connolly (incumbent) | 3,004 | 92.5% | –3.7 |
| Write-in | | 245 | 7.5% | +3.7 |
| Total votes | | 3,249 | 100.0% | |
| Democratic hold | | | | |

=== District 14 ===
Wyoming's 14th State House District General Election, 2020
| Party | Candidate | Votes | % | ±% |
|---|---|---|---|---|
| Democratic | Trey Sherwood | 2,148 | 50.9% | +2.2 |
| Republican | Matthew Burkhart | 2,063 | 48.9% | –2.3 |
| Write-in | | 10 | 0.2% | +0.1 |
| Total votes | | 4,221 | 100.0% | |
| Democratic gain from Republican | | | | |

=== District 15 ===
Wyoming's 15th State House District General Election, 2020
| Party | Candidate | Votes | % | ±% |
|---|---|---|---|---|
| Republican | Donald Burkhart (incumbent) | 2,052 | 64.0% | –33.6 |
| Democratic | Jacquelin Wells | 1,144 | 35.7% | N/A |
| Write-in | | 11 | 0.3% | –2.1 |
| Total votes | | 3,207 | 100.0% | |
| Republican hold | | | | |

=== District 16 ===
Wyoming's 16th State House District General Election, 2020
| Party | Candidate | Votes | % | ±% |
|---|---|---|---|---|
| Democratic | Mike Yin (incumbent) | 4,327 | 96.3% | +36.7 |
| Write-in | | 168 | 3.7% | +3.6 |
| Total votes | | 4,495 | 100.0% | |
| Democratic hold | | | | |

=== District 17 ===
Wyoming's 17th State House District General Election, 2020
| Party | Candidate | Votes | % | ±% |
|---|---|---|---|---|
| Democratic | Chad Banks | 1,822 | 92.5% | +32.2 |
| Write-in | | 148 | 7.5% | +7.0 |
| Total votes | | 1,970 | 100.0% | |
| Democratic hold | | | | |

=== District 18 ===
Wyoming's 18th State House District General Election, 2020
| Party | Candidate | Votes | % | ±% |
|---|---|---|---|---|
| Republican | Scott Heiner | 3,981 | 96.3% | –2.0 |
| Write-in | | 154 | 3.7% | +2.0 |
| Total votes | | 4,135 | 100.0% | |
| Republican hold | | | | |

=== District 19 ===
Wyoming's 19th State House District General Election, 2020
| Party | Candidate | Votes | % | ±% |
|---|---|---|---|---|
| Republican | Danny Eyre (incumbent) | 3,915 | 97.1% | –1.0 |
| Write-in | | 118 | 2.9% | +1.0 |
| Total votes | | 4,033 | 100.0% | |
| Republican hold | | | | |

=== District 20 ===
Wyoming's 20th State House District General Election, 2020
| Party | Candidate | Votes | % | ±% |
|---|---|---|---|---|
| Republican | Albert Sommers (incumbent) | 3,939 | 98.4% | –0.6 |
| Write-in | | 65 | 1.6% | +0.6 |
| Total votes | | 4,004 | 100.0% | |
| Republican hold | | | | |

=== District 21 ===
Wyoming's 21st State House District General Election, 2020
| Party | Candidate | Votes | % | ±% |
|---|---|---|---|---|
| Republican | Evan Simpson (incumbent) | 4,705 | 98.6% | –0.9 |
| Write-in | | 65 | 1.4% | +0.9 |
| Total votes | | 4,770 | 100.0% | |
| Republican hold | | | | |

=== District 22 ===
Wyoming's 22nd State House District General Election, 2020
| Party | Candidate | Votes | % | ±% |
|---|---|---|---|---|
| Independent | Jim Roscoe (incumbent) | 3,191 | 52.47% | −3.1 |
| Republican | Bill Winney | 2,825 | 45.46% | +1.3 |
| Total votes | | 6,081 | 100.0% | |
| Independent hold | | | | |

=== District 23 ===
Wyoming's 23rd State House District General Election, 2020
| Party | Candidate | Votes | % | ±% |
|---|---|---|---|---|
| Democratic | Andy Schwartz (incumbent) | 4,885 | 95.0% | +32.1 |
| Write-in | | 256 | 5.0% | +4.9 |
| Total votes | | 5,141 | 100.0% | |
| Democratic hold | | | | |

=== District 24 ===
Wyoming's 24th State House District General Election, 2020
| Party | Candidate | Votes | % | ±% |
|---|---|---|---|---|
| Republican | Sandy Newsome (incumbent) | 4,009 | 93.0% | +20.9 |
| Write-in | | 304 | 7.0% | +6.4 |
| Total votes | | 4,313 | 100.0% | |
| Republican hold | | | | |

=== District 25 ===
Wyoming's 25th State House District General Election, 2020
| Party | Candidate | Votes | % | ±% |
|---|---|---|---|---|
| Republican | Dan Laursen (incumbent) | 3,722 | 90.6% | –5.4 |
| Write-in | | 388 | 9.4% | +5.4 |
| Total votes | | 4,110 | 100.0% | |
| Republican hold | | | | |

=== District 26 ===
Wyoming's 26th State House District General Election, 2020
| Party | Candidate | Votes | % | ±% |
|---|---|---|---|---|
| Republican | Jamie Flitner (incumbent) | 3,959 | 98.5% | –0.3 |
| Write-in | | 62 | 1.5% | +0.3 |
| Total votes | | 4,021 | 100.0% | |
| Republican hold | | | | |

=== District 27 ===
Wyoming's 27th State House District General Election, 2020
| Party | Candidate | Votes | % | ±% |
|---|---|---|---|---|
| Republican | Mike Greear (incumbent) | 3,763 | 98.3% | ±0.0 |
| Write-in | | 67 | 1.7% | ±0.0 |
| Total votes | | 3,830 | 100.0% | |
| Republican hold | | | | |

=== District 28 ===
Wyoming's 28th State House District General Election, 2020
| Party | Candidate | Votes | % | ±% |
|---|---|---|---|---|
| Republican | John Winter (incumbent) | 3,769 | 81.6% | +6.5 |
| Democratic | Levi Shinkle | 816 | 17.7% | –6.7 |
| Write-in | | 34 | 0.7% | +0.4 |
| Total votes | | 4,619 | 100.0% | |
| Republican hold | | | | |

=== District 29 ===
Wyoming's 29th State House District General Election, 2020
| Party | Candidate | Votes | % | ±% |
|---|---|---|---|---|
| Republican | Mark Kinner (incumbent) | 3,766 | 97.4% | –0.9 |
| Write-in | | 99 | 2.6% | +0.9 |
| Total votes | | 3,865 | 100.0% | |
| Republican hold | | | | |

=== District 30 ===
Wyoming's 30th State House District General Election, 2020
| Party | Candidate | Votes | % | ±% |
|---|---|---|---|---|
| Republican | Mark Jennings (incumbent) | 3,985 | 95.4% | –0.9 |
| Write-in | | 192 | 4.5% | +0.8 |
| Total votes | | 4,177 | 100.0% | |
| Republican hold | | | | |

=== District 31 ===
Wyoming's 31st State House District General Election, 2020
| Party | Candidate | Votes | % | ±% |
|---|---|---|---|---|
| Republican | John Bear | 3,866 | 97.4% | +28.4 |
| Write-in | | 103 | 2.6% | +2.3 |
| Total votes | | 3,969 | 100.0% | |
| Republican hold | | | | |

=== District 32 ===
Wyoming's 32nd State House District General Election, 2020
| Party | Candidate | Votes | % | ±% |
|---|---|---|---|---|
| Republican | Timothy Hallinan (incumbent) | 3,980 | 85.9% | +18.5 |
| Democratic | Lynne Huskinson | 632 | 13.6% | N/A |
| Write-in | | 20 | 0.4% | +0.2 |
| Total votes | | 4,632 | 100.0% | |
| Republican hold | | | | |

=== District 33 ===
Wyoming's 33rd State House District General Election, 2020
| Party | Candidate | Votes | % | ±% |
|---|---|---|---|---|
| Democratic | Andi Clifford (incumbent) | 1,434 | 45.4% | −5.7 |
| Republican | Valaira Whiteman | 1,338 | 42.4% | −6.4 |
| Independent | Clinton D. Wagon | 375 | 11.9% | N/A |
| Write-in | | 11 | 0.3% | +0.2 |
| Total votes | | 3,158 | 100.0% | |
| Democratic hold | | | | |

=== District 34 ===
Wyoming's 34th State House District General Election, 2020
| Party | Candidate | Votes | % | ±% |
|---|---|---|---|---|
| Republican | Pepper L. Ottman | 4,070 | 98.7% | −0.1 |
| Write-in | | 53 | 1.3% | +0.1 |
| Total votes | | 4,123 | 100.0% | |
| Republican hold | | | | |

=== District 35 ===
Wyoming's 35th State House District General Election, 2020
| Party | Candidate | Votes | % | ±% |
|---|---|---|---|---|
| Republican | Joe MacGuire (incumbent) | 5,046 | 97.7% | −0.4 |
| Write-in | | 118 | 2.3% | +0.4 |
| Total votes | | 5,164 | 100.0% | |
| Republican hold | | | | |

=== District 36 ===
Wyoming's 36th State House District General Election, 2020
| Party | Candidate | Votes | % | ±% |
|---|---|---|---|---|
| Republican | Art Washut (incumbent) | 3,041 | 96.5% | +40.6 |
| Write-in | | 109 | 3.5% | +3.4 |
| Total votes | | 3,150 | 100.0% | |
| Republican hold | | | | |

=== District 37 ===
Speaker of House Steve Harshman won the Republican primary. He ran unopposed.

Wyoming's 37th State House District General Election, 2020
| Party | Candidate | Votes | % | ±% |
|---|---|---|---|---|
| Republican | Steve Harshman (incumbent) | 4,335 | 96.7% | ±0.0 |
| Write-in | | 150 | 3.3% | ±0.0 |
| Total votes | | 4,485 | 100.0% | |
| Republican hold | | | | |

=== District 38 ===
Wyoming's 38th State House District General Election, 2020
| Party | Candidate | Votes | % | ±% |
|---|---|---|---|---|
| Republican | Tom Walters (incumbent) | 3,277 | 75.1% | –22.6 |
| Libertarian | Shawn Johnson | 1,068 | 24.5% | N/A |
| Write-in | | 19 | 0.4% | –1.9 |
| Total votes | | 4,364 | 100.0% | |
| Republican hold | | | | |

=== District 39 ===
2020 Wyoming House of Representatives election, District 39
| Party | Candidate | Votes | % | ±% |
|---|---|---|---|---|
| Libertarian | Marshall Burt | 1,696 | 53.6% | N/A |
| Democratic | Stan Blake (incumbent) | 1,421 | 44.9% | –50.2 |
| Write-in | | 47 | 1.5% | –3.4 |
| Total votes | | 3,164 | 100% | +65.0 |
| Libertarian gain from Democratic | | | | |

=== District 40 ===
Wyoming's 40th State House District General Election, 2020
| Party | Candidate | Votes | % | ±% |
|---|---|---|---|---|
| Republican | Barry Crago | 4,489 | 98.1% | +38.0 |
| Write-in | | 85 | 1.9% | +1.7 |
| Total votes | | 4,574 | 100.0% | |
| Republican hold | | | | |

=== District 41 ===
Wyoming's 41st State House District General Election, 2020
| Party | Candidate | Votes | % | ±% |
|---|---|---|---|---|
| Republican | Bill Henderson (incumbent) | 2,497 | 60.3% | +9.6 |
| Democratic | Rebecca Fields | 1,629 | 39.4% | −9.8 |
| Write-in | | 13 | 0.3% | +0.2 |
| Total votes | | 4,139 | 100.0% | |
| Republican hold | | | | |

=== District 42 ===
Wyoming's 42nd State House District General Election, 2020
| Party | Candidate | Votes | % | ±% |
|---|---|---|---|---|
| Republican | Jim Blackburn (incumbent) | 3,918 | 94.8% | +29.0 |
| Write-in | | 216 | 5.2% | +5.0 |
| Total votes | | 4,134 | 100.0% | |
| Republican hold | | | | |

=== District 43 ===
Wyoming's 43rd State House District General Election, 2020
| Party | Candidate | Votes | % | ±% |
|---|---|---|---|---|
| Republican | Dan Zwonitzer (incumbent) | 2,918 | 94.0% | −3.1 |
| Write-in | | 185 | 6.0% | +3.1 |
| Total votes | | 3,103 | 100.0% | |
| Republican hold | | | | |

=== District 44 ===
Wyoming's 44th State House District General Election, 2020
| Party | Candidate | Votes | % | ±% |
|---|---|---|---|---|
| Republican | John Romero-Martinez | 1,552 | 50.4% | +2.2 |
| Democratic | Sara Burlingame (incumbent) | 1,504 | 48.9% | −2.7 |
| Write-in | | 22 | 0.7% | +0.6 |
| Total votes | | 3,078 | 100.0% | |
| Republican gain from Democratic | | | | |

=== District 45 ===
Wyoming's 45th State House District General Election, 2020
| Party | Candidate | Votes | % | ±% |
|---|---|---|---|---|
| Democratic | Karlee Provenza | 2,043 | 51.9% | −8.1 |
| Republican | Roxie Hensley | 1,883 | 47.8% | +8.0 |
| Write-in | | 13 | 0.3% | +0.1 |
| Total votes | | 3,939 | 100.0% | |
| Republican hold | | | | |

=== District 46 ===
Wyoming's 46th State House District General Election, 2020
| Party | Candidate | Votes | % | ±% |
|---|---|---|---|---|
| Republican | Ocean Andrew | 3,409 | 59.2% | +5.0 |
| Democratic | Tim Chestnut | 2,323 | 40.4% | −5.1 |
| Write-in | | 22 | 0.4% | +0.2 |
| Total votes | | 5,754 | 100.0% | |
| Republican hold | | | | |

=== District 47 ===
Wyoming's 47th State House District General Election, 2020
| Party | Candidate | Votes | % | ±% |
|---|---|---|---|---|
| Republican | Jerry Paxton (incumbent) | 3,282 | 78.2% | –20.4 |
| Libertarian | Lela Konecny | 886 | 21.1% | N/A |
| Write-in | | 31 | 0.7% | –0.7 |
| Total votes | | 4,199 | 100.0% | |
| Republican hold | | | | |

=== District 48 ===
Wyoming's 48th State House District General Election, 2020
| Party | Candidate | Votes | % | ±% |
|---|---|---|---|---|
| Republican | Clark Stith (incumbent) | 2,573 | 96.7% | +0.1 |
| Write-in | | 89 | 3.3% | -0.1 |
| Total votes | | 2,662 | 100.0% | |
| Republican hold | | | | |

=== District 49 ===
Wyoming's 49th State House District General Election, 2020
| Party | Candidate | Votes | % | ±% |
|---|---|---|---|---|
| Republican | Robert Wharff | 3,269 | 94.8% | −1.8 |
| Write-in | | 178 | 5.2% | +1.8 |
| Total votes | | 3,447 | 100.0% | |
| Republican hold | | | | |

=== District 50 ===
Wyoming's 32nd State House District General Election, 2020
| Party | Candidate | Votes | % | ±% |
|---|---|---|---|---|
| Republican | Rachel Rodriguez-Williams | 4,373 | 77.6% | −3.1 |
| Independent | Cindy Johnson Bennett | 1,241 | 22.0% | N/A |
| Write-in | | 20 | 0.4% | -0.1 |
| Total votes | | 5,634 | 100.0% | |
| Republican hold | | | | |

=== District 51 ===
Wyoming's 51st State House District General Election, 2020
| Party | Candidate | Votes | % | ±% |
|---|---|---|---|---|
| Republican | Cyrus Western (incumbent) | 5,619 | 96.9% | −1.3 |
| Write-in | | 181 | 3.1% | +1.3 |
| Total votes | | 5,800 | 100.0% | |
| Republican hold | | | | |

=== District 52 ===
Wyoming's 52nd State House District General Election, 2020
| Party | Candidate | Votes | % | ±% |
|---|---|---|---|---|
| Republican | Bill Fortner | 3,368 | 97.3% | +1.3 |
| Write-in | | 92 | 2.7% | -1.3 |
| Total votes | | 3,460 | 100.0% | |
| Republican hold | | | | |

=== District 53 ===
Wyoming's 53rd State House District General Election, 2020
| Party | Candidate | Votes | % | ±% |
|---|---|---|---|---|
| Republican | Roy Edwards (incumbent) | 2,303 | 95.2% | −2.2 |
| Write-in | | 117 | 4.8% | +2.2 |
| Total votes | | 2,420 | 100.0% | |
| Republican hold | | | | |

=== District 54 ===
Wyoming's 54th State House District General Election, 2020
| Party | Candidate | Votes | % | ±% |
|---|---|---|---|---|
| Republican | Lloyd Larsen (incumbent) | 3,148 | 58.4% | +5.8 |
| Democratic | Kevin Wilson | 2,244 | 41.6% | −5.7 |
| Write-in | | 3 | 0.1% | ±0.0 |
| Total votes | | 5,395 | 100.0% | |
| Republican hold | | | | |

=== District 55 ===
Wyoming's 55th State House District General Election, 2020
| Party | Candidate | Votes | % | ±% |
|---|---|---|---|---|
| Republican | Ember Oakley | 2,058 | 50.2% | –0.4 |
| Libertarian | Bethany Baldes | 2,026 | 49.4% | +0.4 |
| Write-in | | 14 | 0.3% | ±0.0 |
| Total votes | | 4,098 | 100.0% | |
| Republican hold | | | | |

=== District 56 ===
Wyoming's 56th State House District General Election, 2020
| Party | Candidate | Votes | % | ±% |
|---|---|---|---|---|
| Republican | Jerry Obermueller (incumbent) | 3,166 | 96.7% | +0.5 |
| Write-in | | 107 | 3.3% | -0.5 |
| Total votes | | 3,273 | 100.0% | |
| Republican hold | | | | |

=== District 57 ===
Wyoming's 57th State House District General Election, 2020
| Party | Candidate | Votes | % | ±% |
|---|---|---|---|---|
| Republican | Chuck Gray (incumbent) | 2,504 | 68.9% | +8.3 |
| Democratic | Jane Ifland | 1,120 | 30.8% | −8.1 |
| Write-in | | 11 | 0.3% | -0.2 |
| Total votes | | 3,625 | 100.0% | |
| Republican hold | | | | |

=== District 58 ===
Wyoming's 58th State House District General Election, 2020
| Party | Candidate | Votes | % | ±% |
|---|---|---|---|---|
| Republican | Pat Sweeney (incumbent) | 2,725 | 80.3% | –15.9 |
| Libertarian | Joseph Porambo | 646 | 19.0% | N/A |
| Write-in | | 21 | 0.6% | –3.2 |
| Total votes | | 3,392 | 100.0% | |
| Republican hold | | | | |

=== District 59 ===
Wyoming's 59th State House District General Election, 2020
| Party | Candidate | Votes | % | ±% |
|---|---|---|---|---|
| Republican | Kevin O'Hearn | 2,658 | 70.2% | +3.6 |
| Democratic | Mike Gilmore | 1,104 | 29.1% | −3.9 |
| Write-in | | 26 | 0.7% | +0.4 |
| Total votes | | 3,788 | 100.0% | |
| Republican hold | | | | |

=== District 60 ===
Wyoming's 60th State House District General Election, 2020
| Party | Candidate | Votes | % | ±% |
|---|---|---|---|---|
| Republican | Mark Baker | 2,793 | 68.8% | N/A |
| Democratic | Lindsey Travis | 1,260 | 31.0% | −64.5 |
| Write-in | | 7 | 0.2% | -4.3 |
| Total votes | | 4,060 | 100.0% | |
| Republican gain from Democratic | | | | |
