= Wyoming's 39th House of Representatives district =

American legislative district

Wyoming's 39th State House of Representatives district
- Wyoming's 39th House of Representatives district as of 2022
Representative
Cody Wylie; R–Rock Springs
- Demographics: 75% White; 1% Black; 17% Hispanic; 2% Native American; 4% Multiracial
- Population (2022): 9,093

Wyoming's 39th House of Representatives district in the United States is one of 62 legislative districts included in the lower house of the Wyoming Legislature. It covers part of Sweetwater County, which compromises the Rock Springs—Green River—Wyoming Micropolitan Statistical Area.

In 1992, the state of Wyoming switched from electing state legislators by county to a district-based system.

== Towns represented ==
- Rock Springs
- Green River (county seat)

== List of members representing the district ==
Representative	Party	Dates	Electoral history
Christopher Boswell (Green River)	Democratic	January 4, 1993 – March 2003	Elected in 1992. Re-elected in 1994. Re-elected in 1996. Re-elected in 1998. Re-elected in 2000. Re-elected in 2002. Resigned in 2003.
John Hastert (Green River)	Democratic	March 2003 – January 1, 2007	Appointed in 2003. Re-elected in 2004. Retired in 2006.
Stan Blake (Green River)	Democratic	January 1, 2007 – January 12, 2021	Elected in 2006. Re-elected in 2008. Re-elected in 2010. Re-elected in 2012. Re-elected in 2014. Re-elected in 2016. Re-elected in 2018. Lost re-election.
Marshall Burt (Green River)	Libertarian	January 12, 2021 – January 10, 2023	Elected in 2020. Lost re-election.
Cody Wylie (Rock Springs)	Republican	January 10, 2023 – present	Elected in 2022. Re-elected in 2024.

== Recent election results ==
- 1996
- 1998
- 2000
- 2002
- 2004
- 2006
- 2008
- 2010
- 2012
- 2014
- 2016
- 2018
- 2020
- 2022
- 2024

=== 2024 ===
2024 Wyoming House of Representatives General Election
Party	Candidate	Votes	%
Republican	Cody Wylie	2,966	96.48%
Write-in		108	3.51%
Total votes		3,074	100.0%
Republican hold			

=== 2022 ===
2022 Wyoming House of Representatives General Election
Party	Candidate	Votes	%
Republican	Cody Wylie	1,763	74.41%
Libertarian	Marshall Burt (incumbent)	586	24.73%
Write-in		20	0.84%
Total votes		2,369	100.0%
Republican gain from Libertarian			

=== 2020 ===
2020 Wyoming House of Representatives General Election
Party	Candidate	Votes	%
Libertarian	Marshall Burt	1,696	53.6%
Democratic	Stan Blake (incumbent)	1,421	44.9%
Write-in		47	1.5%
Total votes		3,164	100.0%
Libertarian gain from Democratic			

2020 Wyoming House of Representatives Democratic Primary election
Candidate	Votes	%
Stan Blake (incumbent)	428	98.8%
Write-in	5	1.2%
Total votes	433	100%

=== 2018 ===
2018 Wyoming House of Representatives Democratic Primary election
Party	Candidate	Votes	%
Democratic	Stan Blake (incumbent)	454	100.0%
Total votes		454	100.0%

2018 Wyoming House of Representatives General election
Party	Candidate	Votes	%
Democratic	Stan Blake (incumbent)	1,823	95.1%
Write-in		94	4.9%
Total votes		1,917	100.0%
Democratic hold			

=== 2016 ===
2016 Wyoming House of Representatives Democratic Primary election
Party	Candidate	Votes	%
Democratic	Stan Blake (incumbent)	491	100.0%
Total votes		491	100.0%

2016 Wyoming House of Representatives General election
Party	Candidate	Votes	%
Democratic	Stan Blake (incumbent)	2,628	100.0%
Total votes		2,628	100.0%
Democratic hold			

=== 2014 ===
2014 Wyoming House of Representatives Democratic Primary election
Party	Candidate	Votes	%
Democratic	Stan Blake (incumbent)	473	100.0%
Total votes		473	100.0%

2014 Wyoming House of Representatives General election
Party	Candidate	Votes	%
Democratic	Stan Blake (incumbent)	1,644	100.0%
Total votes		1,644	100.0%
Democratic hold			

=== 2012 ===
2012 Wyoming House of Representatives Democratic Primary election
Party	Candidate	Votes	%
Democratic	Stan Blake (incumbent)	410	100.0%
Total votes		410	100.0%

2012 Wyoming House of Representatives General election
Party	Candidate	Votes	%
Democratic	Stan Blake (incumbent)	2,727	100.0%
Total votes		2,727	100.0%
Democratic hold			

=== 2010 ===
2010 Wyoming House of Representatives Democratic Primary election
Party	Candidate	Votes	%
Democratic	Stan Blake (incumbent)	724	100.0%
Total votes		724	100.0%

2010 Wyoming House of Representatives General election
Party	Candidate	Votes	%
Democratic	Stan Blake (incumbent)	1,899	100.0%
Total votes		1,899	100.0%
Democratic hold			

=== 2008 ===
2008 Wyoming House of Representatives Democratic Primary election
Party	Candidate	Votes	%
Democratic	Stan Blake (incumbent)	639	100.0%
Total votes		639	100.0%

2008 Wyoming House of Representatives General election
Party	Candidate	Votes	%
Democratic	Stan Blake (incumbent)	2,714	100.0%
Total votes		2,714	100.0%
Democratic hold			

=== 2006 ===
2006 Wyoming House of Representatives Democratic Primary election
Party	Candidate	Votes	%
Democratic	Stan Blake	932	100.0%
Total votes		932	100.0%

2006 Wyoming House of Representatives General election
Party	Candidate	Votes	%
Democratic	Stan Blake	2,173	100.0%
Total votes		2,173	100.0%
Democratic hold			

=== 2004 ===
2004 Wyoming House of Representatives Democratic Primary election
Party	Candidate	Votes	%
Democratic	John Hastert (incumbent)	982	100.0%
Total votes		982	100.0%

2004 Wyoming House of Representatives General election
Party	Candidate	Votes	%
Democratic	John Hastert (incumbent)	2,800	100.0%
Total votes		2,800	100.0%
Democratic hold			

=== 2002 ===
2002 Wyoming House of Representatives Democratic Primary election
Party	Candidate	Votes	%
Democratic	Christopher Boswell (incumbent)	1,180	100.0%
Total votes		1,180	100.0%

2002 Wyoming House of Representatives General election
Party	Candidate	Votes	%
Democratic	Christopher Boswell (incumbent)	2,176	100.0%
Total votes		2,176	100.0%
Democratic hold			

=== 2000 ===
2000 Wyoming House of Representatives Democratic Primary election
Party	Candidate	Votes	%
Democratic	Christopher Boswell (incumbent)	1,014	100.0%
Total votes		1,014	100.0%

2000 Wyoming House of Representatives General election
Party	Candidate	Votes	%
Democratic	Christopher Boswell (incumbent)	2,321	100.0%
Total votes		2,321	100.0%
Democratic hold			

=== 1998 ===
1998 Wyoming House of Representatives Democratic Primary election
Party	Candidate	Votes	%
Democratic	Christopher Boswell (incumbent)	1,031	100.0%
Total votes		1,031	100.0%

1998 Wyoming House of Representatives General election
Party	Candidate	Votes	%
Democratic	Christopher Boswell (incumbent)	1,958	100.0%
Total votes		1,958	100.0%
Democratic hold			

=== 1996 ===
1996 Wyoming House of Representatives Democratic Primary election
Party	Candidate	Votes	%
Democratic	Christopher Boswell (incumbent)	756	100.0%
Total votes		756	100.0%

1996 Wyoming House of Representatives General election
Party	Candidate	Votes	%
Democratic	Christopher Boswell (incumbent)	2,149	100.0%
Total votes		2,149	100.0%
Democratic hold			

== Historical district boundaries ==
Map	Description	Apportionment Plan	Notes
	Sweetwater County (part)	1992 Apportionment Plan	
	Sweetwater County (part)	2002 Apportionment Plan	
	Sweetwater County (part)	2012 Apportionment Plan	

== See also ==
- Wyoming Legislature
- Wyoming House of Representatives
- Wyoming Senate
