= Libertarian Party of Wyoming =

State affiliate of the Libertarian Party

- Abbreviation: LPWY
- Chairperson: Shawn Johnson
- Headquarters: 2201 Davis Lane; Riverton, Wyoming 82501
- Membership (2021): ▲2,891
- Ideology: Libertarianism
- National affiliation: Libertarian Party
- Colors: Gold-yellow
- Statewide executive offices: 0 / 5
- Seats in the Wyoming Senate: 0 / 30
- Seats in the Wyoming House: 0 / 60
- WY seats in the U.S. Senate: 0 / 2
- WY seats in the U.S. House: 0 / 1
- Other elected officials: 0 (June 2024)

Website
- lpwy.org

The Libertarian Party of Wyoming (LPWY) is the affiliate of the US Libertarian Party (LP) in Wyoming, headquartered in Riverton. As of 2021 it was the third-largest political party in Wyoming by voter registration (approaching 1%), with a share of votes cast that has exceeded 5%.

== History ==
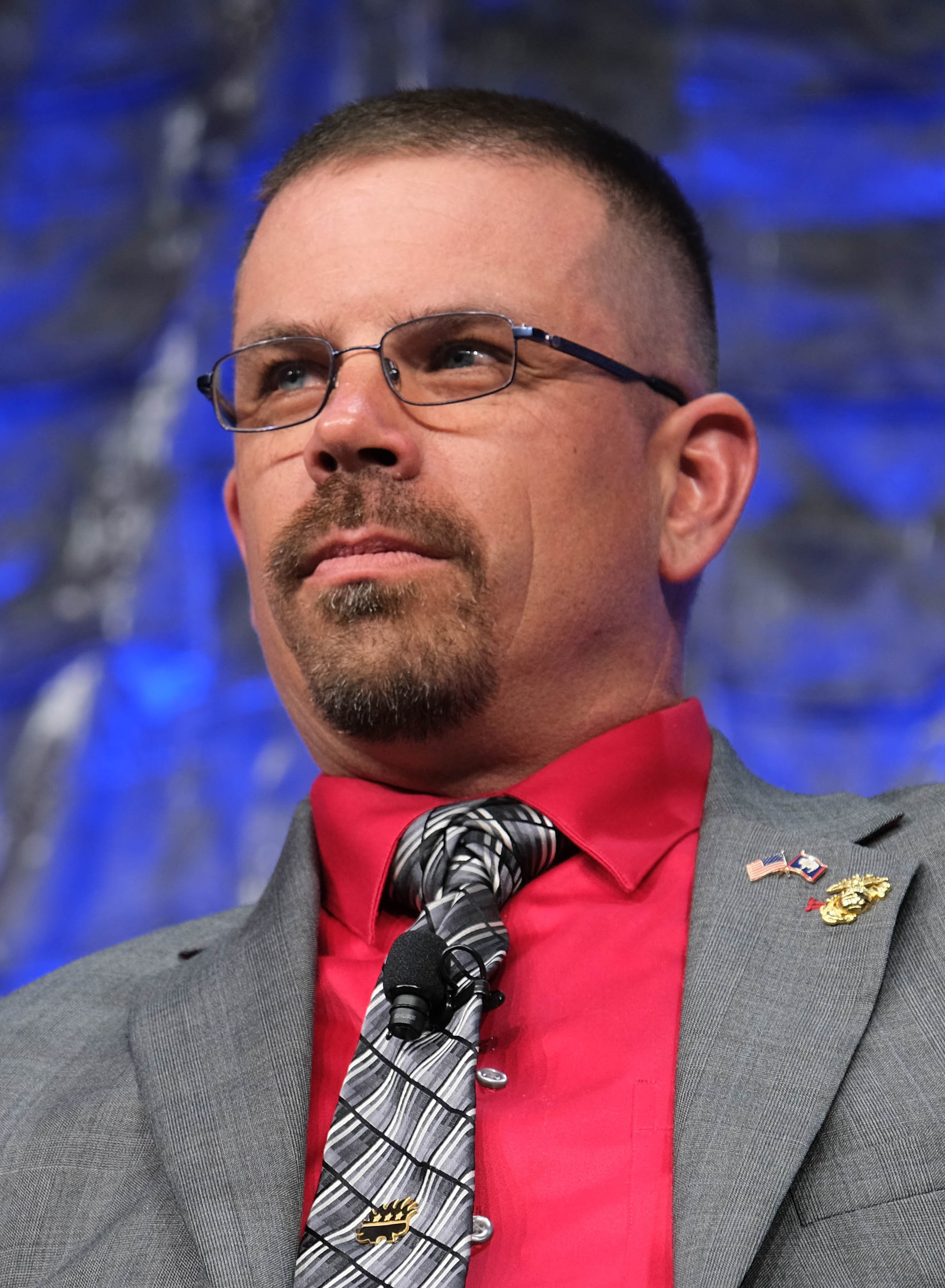
Marshall Burt was elected to the Wyoming House of Representatives in the 2020 election

=== 1970s ===
On July 26, 1976, the Libertarians started a petition drive so that their presidential candidate, Roger MacBride, could appear on the ballot. They were unsuccessful in gathering at least 6,300 signatures by September 28, but MacBride received 89 write-in votes (0.1%) in the general election.

=== 1980s ===
On August 11, 1980, the Libertarians started a petition drive so that their presidential candidate, Ed Clark, could appear on the ballot. Around 11,000 signatures were collected and on September 18, the Secretary of State certified 6,522 of the signatures, which was more than the 6,469 required, allowing Clark to appear on the ballot as an independent candidate. Clark campaigned in Casper, Wyoming, and received 4,514 votes (2.6%) in the general election.

In 1984, four members of the Libertarian Party filed a lawsuit in the U.S. District Court in Cheyenne, Wyoming, to have eleven sections of Wyoming's election codes declared unconstitutional. Judge C. A. Brimmer ruled in favor of the Libertarians, but allowed Secretary of State Thyra Thomson to enforce the election code during the 1984 elections.

On February 8, 1986, the Libertarian and American parties of Wyoming merged to form the Wyoming American-Libertarian Party. However, on May 3, the party was dissolved after gathering 3,000 signatures, less than the 8,000 required to run candidates.

During the 1988 presidential election both Ron Paul, the Libertarian presidential nominee, and Andre Marrou, the party's vice-presidential nominee, campaigned in Sheridan, Wyoming. They received 2,026 votes (1.2%) in the general election.

=== 2010s ===
In the 2002, 2006, and 2014 Wyoming Secretary of State elections the Libertarian nominees received over 10% of the popular vote giving the Libertarian Party major party status in Wyoming. Major party status allowed the party to nominate via primary unlike how minor parties nominate via convention.

In the 2018 election Bethany Baldes ran for a seat in the Wyoming House of Representatives from the 55th district. She was narrowly defeated by incumbent Representative David Miller by 53 votes.

=== 2020s ===
During the 2020 elections Marshall Burt was elected to the Wyoming House of Representatives from the 39th district, becoming the fifth Libertarian elected to a state legislature and the first since 2002. He formed the Libertarian Caucus on February 16, 2022. Burt lost re-election to Republican Cody Wylie in 2022.

== Voter registration ==
Year	RV.	%	Change
1982	~50	N/A	Steady
1984	54	(0.02%)	▲
1988	75	(0.03%)	▲0.01%
1992	78	(0.03%)	▲0.00%
1994	53	(0.02%)	▼0.01%
1996	181	(0.08%)	▲0.06%
1998	229	(0.10%)	▲0.02%
2000	246	(0.11%)	▲0.01%
2002	281	(0.12%)	▲0.01%
2004	328	(0.14%)	▲0.02%
2006	452	(0.17%)	▲0.03%
2008	1,312	(0.48%)	▲0.31%
2009	1,312	(0.50%)	▲0.02%
2010	1,439	(0.52%)	▲0.02%
2011	1,432	(0.52%)	0.00%
2012	833	(0.39%)	▼0.13%
2013	2,055	(0.74%)	▲0.35%
2014	1,908	(0.74%)	0.00%
2015	1,989	(0.74%)	0.00%
2016	1,004	(0.50%)	▼0.24%
2017	2,655	(0.93%)	▲0.43%
2018	2,407	(0.92%)	▼0.01%
2019	2,443	(0.86%)	▼0.06%
2020	1,396	(0.63%)	▼0.23%
2021	2,891	(0.95%)	▲0.32%
2022	2,615	(0.93%)	▼0.02%
2023	2,392	(0.79%)	▼0.14%
2024	1,028	(0.47%)	▼0.32%

== Electoral performance ==
=== Presidential ===
Election year	Vote percentage	±%	Votes	Presidential candidate	Vice presidential candidate	Result	Reference
1976	0.1%	N/A	89	Roger MacBride (Note: Not on the ballot. Votes counted were write-ins.)	David Bergland	5th	
1980	2.6%	▲2.5	4,514	Ed Clark (Note: Placed on the ballot as an independent due to a lack of ballot access for the Libertarian Party.)	David Koch	4th	
1984	1.3%	▼1.3	2,357	David Bergland	James A. Lewis	3rd	
1988	1.2%	▼0.1	2,026	Ron Paul	Andre Marrou	3rd	
1992	0.4%	▼0.7	844	Andre Marrou	Nancy Lord	4th	
1996	0.8%	▲0.4	1,739	Harry Browne	Jo Jorgensen	4th	
2000	0.7%	▼0.2	1,443	Harry Browne	Art Olivier	5th	
2004	0.5%	▼0.2	1,171	Michael Badnarik	Richard Campagna	4th	
2008	0.6%	▲0.2	1,594	Bob Barr	Wayne Allyn Root	4th	
2012	2.1%	▲1.5	5,326	Gary Johnson	Jim Gray	3rd	
2016	5.2%	▲3.1	13,287	Gary Johnson	Bill Weld	3rd	
2020	2.1%	▼3.1	5,768	Jo Jorgensen	Spike Cohen	3rd	
2024	1.6%	▼0.5	4,193	Chase Oliver	Mike ter Maat	3rd	

=== State legislative ===
2018 Wyoming House of Representatives election, District 55
Party	Candidate	Votes	%
Republican	David Miller (incumbent)	1,645	50.6
Libertarian	Bethany Baldes	1,592	49.0
Write-in		11	0.3
Total votes		3,248	100%
Republican hold			

2020 Wyoming House of Representatives election, District 39
Party	Candidate	Votes	%	±%
Libertarian	Marshall Burt	1,696	53.6	N/A
Democratic	Stan Blake (incumbent)	1,421	44.9	–50.2
Write-in		47	1.5	–3.4
Total votes		3,164	100%	+65.0
Libertarian gain from Democratic				

2022 Wyoming House of Representatives election, District 39
Party	Candidate	Votes	%	±%
Republican	Cody Wylie	1,763	74.4	N/A
Libertarian	Marshall Burt (incumbent)	586	24.7	–28.9
Write-in		20	0.8	–0.7
Total votes		2,369	100%	
Republican gain from Libertarian				
