= 2018 Wyoming House of Representatives election =

- November 6, 2018

All 60 seats in the Wyoming House of Representatives 31 seats needed for a majority
	Majority party	Minority party
Leader	Steve Harshman	Cathy Connolly
Party	Republican	Democratic
Leader since	January 10, 2017	January 10, 2017
Leader's seat	37th	13th
Seats before	51	9
Seats won	50	9
Seat change	▼1	Steady
Popular vote	136,565	35,228
Percentage	75.2%	19.4%
	Third party
Party	Independent
Seats before	0
Seats won	1
Seat change	▲1
Popular vote	5,931
Percentage	3.3%
- Results of the election: Republican gain Republican hold Democratic gain Democratic hold Independent gain
Speaker before election
Steve Harshman
Republican
Elected Speaker
Steve Harshman
Republican

All 60 seats in the Wyoming House of Representatives were up for election on November 6, 2018, as part of the 2018 Wyoming elections. Primary elections were held on August 21.

== Results summary ==
Summary of the November 6, 2018 Wyoming House election results
Party	Candidates	Votes	%	Seats				
Party	Candidates	Votes	%	Before	Up	Won	After	+/–
Republican	57	136,565	75.2	51	51	50	50	▼1
Democratic	25	35,228	19.4	9	9	9	9	Steady
Independent	4	5,931	3.3	0	0	1	1	▲1
Libertarian	1	1,592	0.9	0	0	0	0	Steady
Write-in		2,328	1.3					
Total		181,644	100%	60				

Popular vote
Republican	75.2%
Democratic	19.4%
Independent	3.3%
Libertarian	0.9%
Write-in	1.3%

House seats
Republican	83.3%
Democratic	15.0%
Independent	1.7%

== Predictions ==
Source	Ranking	As of
Governing	Safe R	October 8, 2018

== Detailed results by State House district ==
=== District 1 ===
2018 Wyoming House of Representatives election, District 1
Party	Candidate	Votes	%
Republican	Tyler Lindholm (incumbent)	3,688	98.3
Write-in		65	1.7
Total votes		3,753	100%
Republican hold			

=== District 2 ===
2018 Wyoming House of Representatives election, District 2
Party	Candidate	Votes	%
Republican	Hans Hunt (incumbent)	3,261	98.3
Write-in		57	1.7
Total votes		3,318	100%
Republican hold			

=== District 3 ===
2018 Wyoming House of Representatives election, District 3
Party	Candidate	Votes	%
Republican	Eric Barlow (incumbent)	2,811	99.2
Write-in		23	0.8
Total votes		2,834	100%
Republican hold			

=== District 4 ===
2018 Wyoming House of Representatives election, District 4
Party	Candidate	Votes	%
Republican	Dan Kirkbride (incumbent)	3,645	98.0
Write-in		75	2.0
Total votes		3,720	100%
Republican hold			

=== District 5 ===
2018 Wyoming House of Representatives election, District 5
Party	Candidate	Votes	%
Republican	Shelly Duncan	2,760	76.7
Democratic	Joan Brinkley	798	22.2
Write-in		41	1.1
Total votes		3,599	100%
Republican hold			

=== District 6 ===
2018 Wyoming House of Representatives election, District 6
Party	Candidate	Votes	%
Republican	Aaron Clausen (incumbent)	2,942	99.2
Write-in		23	0.8
Total votes		2,965	100%
Republican hold			

=== District 7 ===
2018 Wyoming House of Representatives election, District 7
Party	Candidate	Votes	%
Republican	Sue Wilson (incumbent)	4,283	98.5
Write-in		67	1.5
Total votes		4,350	100%
Republican hold			

=== District 8 ===
2018 Wyoming House of Representatives election, District 8
Party	Candidate	Votes	%
Republican	Bob Nicholas (incumbent)	2,212	57.7
Democratic	Mitch Guthrie	1,609	42.0
Write-in		10	0.3
Total votes		3,831	100%
Republican hold			

=== District 9 ===
2018 Wyoming House of Representatives election, District 9
Party	Candidate	Votes	%
Republican	Landon Brown (incumbent)	2,594	98.7
Write-in		34	1.3
Total votes		2,628	100%
Republican hold			

=== District 10 ===
2018 Wyoming House of Representatives election, District 10
Party	Candidate	Votes	%
Republican	John Eklund Jr. (incumbent)	3,332	79.9
Democratic	Jenefer Pasqua	825	19.8
Write-in		14	0.3
Total votes		4,171	100%
Republican hold			

=== District 11 ===
2018 Wyoming House of Representatives election, District 11
Party	Candidate	Votes	%
Republican	Jared Olsen (incumbent)	1,275	53.6
Democratic	Calob Taylor	1,098	46.2
Write-in		5	0.2
Total votes		2,378	100%
Republican hold			

=== District 12 ===
2018 Wyoming House of Representatives election, District 12
Party	Candidate	Votes	%
Republican	Clarence Styvar	1,359	55.9
Democratic	Ryan Lindsey	1,063	43.8
Write-in		7	0.3
Total votes		2,429	100%
Republican hold			

=== District 13 ===
2018 Wyoming House of Representatives election, District 13
Party	Candidate	Votes	%
Democratic	Cathy Connolly (incumbent)	2,477	96.2
Write-in		99	3.8
Total votes		2,576	100%
Democratic hold			

=== District 14 ===
2018 Wyoming House of Representatives election, District 14
Party	Candidate	Votes	%
Republican	Dan Furphy (incumbent)	1,714	51.2
Democratic	Lorraine Saulino-Klein	1,628	48.7
Write-in		3	0.1
Total votes		3,345	100%
Republican hold			

=== District 15 ===
2018 Wyoming House of Representatives election, District 15
Party	Candidate	Votes	%
Republican	Donald Burkhart (incumbent)	1,997	97.6
Write-in		50	2.4
Total votes		2,047	100%
Republican hold			

=== District 16 ===
2018 Wyoming House of Representatives election, District 16
Party	Candidate	Votes	%
Democratic	Mike Yin	2,530	59.6
Republican	Barbara Allen	1,712	40.3
Write-in		4	0.1
Total votes		4,246	100%
Democratic hold			

=== District 17 ===
2018 Wyoming House of Representatives election, District 17
Party	Candidate	Votes	%
Democratic	JoAnn Dayton-Selman (incumbent)	1,240	59.3
Republican	Traci Ciepiela (withdrawn)	841	40.2
Write-in		11	0.5
Total votes		2,092	100%
Democratic hold			

=== District 18 ===
2018 Wyoming House of Representatives election, District 18
Party	Candidate	Votes	%
Republican	Thomas Crank (incumbent)	3,088	98.3
Write-in		52	1.7
Total votes		3,140	100%
Republican hold			

=== District 19 ===
2018 Wyoming House of Representatives election, District 19
Party	Candidate	Votes	%
Republican	Danny Eyre (incumbent)	2,617	98.1
Write-in		51	1.9
Total votes		2,668	100%
Republican hold			

=== District 20 ===
2018 Wyoming House of Representatives election, District 20
Party	Candidate	Votes	%
Republican	Albert Sommers (incumbent)	2,749	99.0
Write-in		29	1.0
Total votes		2,778	100%
Republican hold			

=== District 21 ===
2018 Wyoming House of Representatives election, District 21
Party	Candidate	Votes	%
Republican	Evan Simpson (incumbent)	3,184	99.5
Write-in		17	0.5
Total votes		3,201	100%
Republican hold			

=== District 22 ===
2018 Wyoming House of Representatives election, District 22
Party	Candidate	Votes	%
Independent	Jim Roscoe	2,495	55.6
Republican	Marti Halverson (incumbent)	1,983	44.2
Write-in		12	0.3
Total votes		4,490	100%
Independent gain from Republican			

=== District 23 ===
2018 Wyoming House of Representatives election, District 23
Party	Candidate	Votes	%
Democratic	Andy Schwartz (incumbent)	3,358	62.9
Republican	Alex Muromcew	1,979	37.1
Write-in		3	0.1
Total votes		5,340	100%
Democratic hold			

=== District 24 ===
2018 Wyoming House of Representatives election, District 24
Party	Candidate	Votes	%
Republican	Sandy Newsome	2,759	72.1
Democratic	Paul Fees	1,047	27.4
Write-in		22	0.6
Total votes		3,828	100%
Republican hold			

=== District 25 ===
2018 Wyoming House of Representatives election, District 25
Party	Candidate	Votes	%
Republican	Dan Laursen (incumbent)	2,586	96.0
Write-in		107	4.0
Total votes		2,693	100%
Republican hold			

=== District 26 ===
2018 Wyoming House of Representatives election, District 26
Party	Candidate	Votes	%
Republican	Jamie Flitner (incumbent)	2,832	98.8
Write-in		33	1.2
Total votes		2,865	100%
Republican hold			

=== District 27 ===
2018 Wyoming House of Representatives election, District 27
Party	Candidate	Votes	%
Republican	Mike Greear (incumbent)	2,892	98.3
Write-in		49	1.7
Total votes		2,941	100%
Republican hold			

=== District 28 ===
2018 Wyoming House of Representatives election, District 28
Party	Candidate	Votes	%
Republican	John Winter	2,906	75.1
Democratic	Howie Samelson	954	24.7
Write-in		10	0.3
Total votes		3,870	100%
Republican hold			

=== District 29 ===
2018 Wyoming House of Representatives election, District 29
Party	Candidate	Votes	%
Republican	Mark Kinner (incumbent)	2,550	98.3
Write-in		43	1.7
Total votes		2,593	100%
Republican hold			

=== District 30 ===
2018 Wyoming House of Representatives election, District 30
Party	Candidate	Votes	%
Republican	Mark Jennings (incumbent)	2,870	96.3
Write-in		110	3.7
Total votes		2,980	100%
Republican hold			

=== District 31 ===
2018 Wyoming House of Representatives election, District 31
Party	Candidate	Votes	%
Republican	Scott Clem (incumbent)	1,826	69.0
Independent	Dave Hardesty	814	30.8
Write-in		7	0.3
Total votes		2,647	100%
Republican hold			

=== District 32 ===
2018 Wyoming House of Representatives election, District 32
Party	Candidate	Votes	%
Republican	Timothy Hallinan (incumbent)	2,223	67.4
Independent	Chad Trebby	1,070	32.4
Write-in		7	0.2
Total votes		3,300	100%
Republican hold			

=== District 33 ===
2018 Wyoming House of Representatives election, District 33
Party	Candidate	Votes	%
Democratic	Andi Clifford	1,317	51.1
Republican	Jim Allen (incumbent)	1,259	48.8
Write-in		3	0.1
Total votes		2,579	100%
Democratic gain from Republican			

=== District 34 ===
2018 Wyoming House of Representatives election, District 34
Party	Candidate	Votes	%
Republican	Tim Salazar (incumbent)	3,105	98.8
Write-in		38	1.2
Total votes		3,143	100%
Republican hold			

=== District 35 ===
2018 Wyoming House of Representatives election, District 35
Party	Candidate	Votes	%
Republican	Joe MacGuire (incumbent)	3,411	98.1
Write-in		66	1.9
Total votes		3,477	100%
Republican hold			

=== District 36 ===
2018 Wyoming House of Representatives election, District 36
Party	Candidate	Votes	%
Republican	Art Washut	1,407	55.9
Democratic	Debbie Bovee (incumbent)	1,106	44.0
Write-in		2	0.1
Total votes		2,515	100%
Republican gain from Democratic			

=== District 37 ===
2018 Wyoming House of Representatives election, District 37
Party	Candidate	Votes	%
Republican	Steve Harshman (incumbent)	3,215	96.7
Write-in		110	3.3
Total votes		3,325	100%
Republican hold			

=== District 38 ===
2018 Wyoming House of Representatives election, District 38
Party	Candidate	Votes	%
Republican	Tom Walters (incumbent)	2,656	97.7
Write-in		63	2.3
Total votes		2,719	100%
Republican hold			

=== District 39 ===
2018 Wyoming House of Representatives election, District 39
Party	Candidate	Votes	%
Democratic	Stan Blake (incumbent)	1,823	95.1
Write-in		94	4.9
Total votes		1,917	100%
Democratic hold			

=== District 40 ===
2018 Wyoming House of Representatives election, District 32
Party	Candidate	Votes	%
Republican	Richard Tass	2,355	60.1
Independent	Chris Schock	1,552	39.6
Write-in		9	0.2
Total votes		3,916	100%
Republican hold			

=== District 41 ===
2018 Wyoming House of Representatives election, District 41
Party	Candidate	Votes	%
Republican	Bill Henderson (incumbent)	1,552	50.7
Democratic	Sean Castaneda	1,507	49.2
Write-in		4	0.1
Total votes		3,063	100%
Republican hold			

=== District 42 ===
2018 Wyoming House of Representatives election, District 42
Party	Candidate	Votes	%
Republican	Jim Blackburn (incumbent)	2,187	65.8
Democratic	Juliet Daniels	1,130	34.0
Write-in		5	0.2
Total votes		3,322	100%
Republican hold			

=== District 43 ===
2018 Wyoming House of Representatives election, District 43
Party	Candidate	Votes	%
Republican	Dan Zwonitzer (incumbent)	1,901	97.1
Write-in		56	2.9
Total votes		1,957	100%
Republican hold			

=== District 44 ===
2018 Wyoming House of Representatives election, District 44
Party	Candidate	Votes	%
Democratic	Sara Burlingame	1,058	51.6
Republican	Paul Johnson	989	48.2
Write-in		3	0.1
Total votes		2,050	100%
Democratic hold			

=== District 45 ===
2018 Wyoming House of Representatives election, District 45
Party	Candidate	Votes	%
Democratic	Charles Pelkey (incumbent)	1,784	60.0
Republican	Roxie Jackson Hensley	1,185	39.8
Write-in		6	0.2
Total votes		2,975	100%
Democratic hold			

=== District 46 ===
2018 Wyoming House of Representatives election, District 46
Party	Candidate	Votes	%
Republican	Bill Haley (incumbent)	2,317	54.2
Democratic	Jackie Grimes	1,944	45.5
Write-in		10	0.2
Total votes		4,271	100%
Republican hold			

=== District 47 ===
2018 Wyoming House of Representatives election, District 47
Party	Candidate	Votes	%
Republican	Jerry Paxton (incumbent)	2,912	98.6
Write-in		40	1.4
Total votes		2,952	100%
Republican hold			

=== District 48 ===
2018 Wyoming House of Representatives election, District 48
Party	Candidate	Votes	%
Republican	Clark Stith (incumbent)	1,882	96.6
Write-in		66	3.4
Total votes		1,948	100%
Republican hold			

=== District 49 ===
2018 Wyoming House of Representatives election, District 49
Party	Candidate	Votes	%
Republican	Garry Piiparinen (incumbent)	2,166	96.6
Write-in		77	3.4
Total votes		2,243	100%
Republican hold			

=== District 50 ===
2018 Wyoming House of Representatives election, District 50
Party	Candidate	Votes	%
Republican	David Northrup (incumbent)	3,288	80.7
Democratic	Mike Specht	763	18.7
Write-in		22	0.5
Total votes		4,073	100%
Republican hold			

=== District 51 ===
2018 Wyoming House of Representatives election, District 51
Party	Candidate	Votes	%
Republican	Cyrus Western	4,140	98.2
Write-in		76	1.8
Total votes		4,216	100%
Republican hold			

=== District 52 ===
2018 Wyoming House of Representatives election, District 52
Party	Candidate	Votes	%
Republican	William Pownall (incumbent)	2,060	96.0
Write-in		86	4.0
Total votes		2,146	100%
Republican hold			

=== District 53 ===
2018 Wyoming House of Representatives election, District 53
Party	Candidate	Votes	%
Republican	Roy Edwards (incumbent)	1,793	97.4
Write-in		48	2.6
Total votes		1,841	100%
Republican hold			

=== District 54 ===
2018 Wyoming House of Representatives election, District 54
Party	Candidate	Votes	%
Republican	Lloyd Larsen (incumbent)	2,305	52.6
Democratic	Mark Calhoun	2,073	47.3
Write-in		5	0.1
Total votes		4,383	100%
Republican hold			

=== District 55 ===
2018 Wyoming House of Representatives election, District 55
Party	Candidate	Votes	%
Republican	David Miller (incumbent)	1,645	50.6
Libertarian	Bethany Baldes	1,592	49.0
Write-in		11	0.3
Total votes		3,248	100%
Republican hold			

=== District 56 ===
2018 Wyoming House of Representatives election, District 56
Party	Candidate	Votes	%
Republican	Jerry Obermueller (incumbent)	2,240	96.2
Write-in		89	3.8
Total votes		2,329	100%
Republican hold			

=== District 57 ===
2018 Wyoming House of Representatives election, District 57
Party	Candidate	Votes	%
Republican	Chuck Gray (incumbent)	1,542	60.6
Democratic	Jane Ifland	989	38.9
Write-in		12	0.5
Total votes		2,543	100%
Republican hold			

=== District 58 ===
2018 Wyoming House of Representatives election, District 58
Party	Candidate	Votes	%
Republican	Pat Sweeney (incumbent)	1,883	96.2
Write-in		75	3.8
Total votes		1,958	100%
Republican hold			

=== District 59 ===
2018 Wyoming House of Representatives election, District 59
Party	Candidate	Votes	%
Republican	Bunky Loucks (incumbent)	1,700	66.6
Democratic	Laurie Longtine	843	33.0
Write-in		8	0.3
Total votes		2,551	100%
Republican hold			

=== District 60 ===
2018 Wyoming House of Representatives election, District 60
Party	Candidate	Votes	%
Democratic	John Freeman (incumbent)	2,208	95.5
Write-in		104	4.5
Total votes		2,312	100%
Democratic hold			
