= Wyoming's 27th House of Representatives district =

American legislative district

Wyoming's 27th State House of Representatives district
- Wyoming's 27th House of Representatives district as of 2022
Representative
Martha Lawley; R–Worland
- Demographics: 82% White; 13% Hispanic; 4% Multiracial
- Population (2022): 9,085

Wyoming's 27th House of Representatives district is one of 62 districts in the Wyoming House of Representatives. The district encompasses Washakie County as well as parts of Big Horn counties. It is represented by Republican Representative Martha Lawley of Worland.

In 1992, the state of Wyoming switched from electing state legislators by county to a district-based system.

== List of members representing the district ==
Representative	Party	Term	Note
Ray Harrison	Republican	1993 – 1999	Elected in 1992. Re-elected in 1994. Re-elected in 1996.
N. Jane Wostenberg	Republican	1999 – 2005	Elected in 1998. Re-elected in 2000. Re-elected in 2002.
Debbie Hammons	Democratic	2005 – 2011	Elected in 2004. Re-elected in 2006. Re-elected in 2008.
Mike Greear	Republican	2011 – 2023	Elected in 2010. Re-elected in 2012. Re-elected in 2014. Re-elected in 2016. Re-elected in 2018. Re-elected in 2020.
Martha Lawley	Republican	2023 – present	Elected in 2022. Re-elected in 2024.

== Recent election results ==
=== 2014 ===
House district 27 general election
Party	Candidate	Votes	%
Republican	Mike Greear (Incumbent)	2,650	98.58%
Write-ins		38	1.41%
Total votes		2,688	100.0%
Invalid or blank votes		403	
Republican hold			

=== 2016 ===
House district 27 general election
Party	Candidate	Votes	%
Republican	Mike Greear (Incumbent)	3,304	85.06%
Democratic	Robert D. McDonough Jr.	565	14.54%
Write-ins		15	0.38%
Total votes		3,884	100.0%
Invalid or blank votes		240	
Republican hold			

=== 2018 ===
House district 27 general election
Party	Candidate	Votes	%
Republican	Mike Greear (Incumbent)	2,892	98.33%
Write-ins		49	1.66%
Total votes		2,941	100.0%
Invalid or blank votes		405	
Republican hold			

=== 2020 ===
House district 27 general election
Party	Candidate	Votes	%
Republican	Mike Greear (Incumbent)	3,763	98.25%
Write-ins		67	1.74%
Total votes		3,830	100.0%
Invalid or blank votes		497	
Republican hold			

=== 2022 ===
House district 27 general election
Party	Candidate	Votes	%
Republican	Martha Lawley	3,143	99.08%
Write-ins		29	0.91%
Total votes		3,172	100.0%
Invalid or blank votes		455	
Republican hold			

=== 2024 ===
House district 27 general election
Party	Candidate	Votes	%
Republican	Martha Lawley (Incumbent)	3,918	97.39%
Write-ins		105	2.60%
Total votes		4,023	100.0%
Invalid or blank votes		531	
Republican hold			

== Historical district boundaries ==
Map	Description	Apportionment Plan	Notes
	Washakie County (part)	1992 Apportionment Plan	
	Washakie County	2002 Apportionment Plan	
	Washakie County; Big Horn County (part)	2012 Apportionment Plan	
