= Debbie Hammons =

American politician

Deborah Healy Hammons

Member of the Wyoming House of Representatives from the 27th district
- In office 2005–2011
- Preceded by: N. Jane Wostenberg
- Succeeded by: Mike Greear

Personal details
- Born: November 27, 1950 (age 75) Worland, Wyoming, U.S.
- Party: Democratic
- Spouse: Greg
- Children: 2
- Profession: TV producer, writer

Debbie Healy Hammons (born November 27, 1950) is a former Democratic member of the Wyoming House of Representatives, representing the 27th district from 2005 to 2011.
