= Wyoming Public Service Commission =

Government agency in Wyoming, United States

Agency overview
- Formed: 1915
- Jurisdiction: Wyoming
- Headquarters: Cheyenne, Wyoming
- Agency executives: Mike Robinson, Chairman; Chris Petrie, Deputy Chairman
- Website: psc.wyo.gov/home

The Wyoming Public Service Commission was created by the Wyoming Legislature in 1915 to oversee public utilities. It has jurisdiction over the certification of utility service areas, adjudication of consumer complaints against utility companies, approval of the securities issued or assumed by utilities, and approval of significant utility operations, including construction projects and corporate reorganization. The Commission consists of three members appointed by the Governor and confirmed by the Senate to staggered six-year terms, with no more than two commissioners belonging to the same political party.

== History ==
In 1915, the state legislature established the Commission, which consisted of the Governor, Auditor, and Treasurer. In 1919, the legislature reorganized it, and deputized the State Board of Equalization to serve ex officio as members of the Commission.

At Governor Stanley K. Hathaway's recommendation, the legislature split the Commission in 1967, separating it from the Board of Equalization and establishing it as a separate entity in its current form. The first gubernatorial appointees to the newly established Commission were Republicans Walter Hudson and Richard J. Luman and Democrat Zan Lewis.

== Membership ==
Public Service Commissioners
Commissioner	Appointed by	Assumed office	Term expires
Mike Robinson, Chairman	Mark Gordon	March 1, 2019	March 1, 2029
Chris Petrie, Deputy Chairman	Mark Gordon	February 1, 2021	March 1, 2031
Christopher Boswell	Mark Gordon	October 1, 2025	March 1, 2027
