= N. Jane Wostenberg =

Wyoming politician

Member of the Wyoming House of Representatives from the 27th district
- In office 1999–2004
- Preceded by: Ray Harrison
- Succeeded by: Debbie Hammons

Personal details
- Party: Republican

N. Jane Wostenberg is an American Republican politician from Worland, Washakie County, Wyoming. She represented the 27th district in the Wyoming House of Representatives from 1999 to 2004.
