= Christopher Boswell =

American politician

Wyoming Public Service Commissioner
- Incumbent
- Assumed office October 1, 2025
- Preceded by: Mary Throne

Minority Leader of the Wyoming House of Representatives
- In office January 9, 2001 – March 13, 2003
- Preceded by: Louise Ryckman
- Succeeded by: Wayne Reese

Member of the Wyoming House of Representatives from the 39th district
- In office January 4, 1993 – March 13, 2003
- Preceded by: District created
- Succeeded by: John Hastert

Personal details
- Born: 1956 or 1957 (age 68–69)
- Party: Democratic
- Spouse: Kathryn
- Education: University of Wyoming (B.A., M.A.)
- Occupation: Tavernkeeper

Christopher Boswell (born 1957) is an American Democratic politician from the state of Wyoming who currently serves as a member of the Wyoming Public Service Commission. Boswell previously served as a member of the Wyoming House of Representatives from 1993 to 2003, and as Minority Leader from 2001 to 2003.

== Early career ==
Boswell attended the University of Wyoming, receiving his bachelor's degree in journalism in 1980. He was the news director for KUGR and subsequently returned to the university, receiving his master's degree in 1989. He owned and operated the Embassy Tavern in Green River.

In 1988, Boswell ran for the Green River City Council against incumbent Councilman John Anastos, and lost the election by a single vote. Following the election, Boswell challenged the outcome, arguing that the result was in question because an unregistered voter had unlawfully cast a ballot. Several voters filed a petition to seek a special election, but the petition was dismissed several weeks later.

== Wyoming House of Representatives ==
In 1992, after elections for the Wyoming House of Representatives were converted from county-level representation to districts, Boswell announced that he would run in the 39th district, based in southwestern Sweetwater County. He was elected unopposed in the primary and general election.

Boswell was re-elected without opposition in 1994, and was elected caucus chairman following the election. He was re-elected unopposed in 1996, 1998, and 2000. After the 2000 election, Boswell was elected Minority Leader, succeeding retiring State Representative Louise Ryckman. He was re-elected without opposition in 2002.

== Post-legislative career ==
In 2003, Boswell resigned from the state House, and was appointed as chief of staff to Governor Dave Freudenthal. Boswell served until 2011, following the election of Republican Matt Mead as governor in 2010. He was appointed by Mead to serve as the director of the Wyoming Department of Administration and Information in 2011.

In 2012, Boswell was appointed the vice president for governmental and community affairs of the University of Wyoming, and retired in 2018. He was one of the three finalists for the interim presidency of the university following Laurie Nichols's departure in 2019, but Neil Theobald was ultimately selected. Boswell temporarily resumed his role as vice president in 2019, returning "to help as the board of trustees convene a search for a permanent president."

In 2025, upon the resignation of Mary Throne from the Wyoming Public Service Commission, Governor Mark Gordon appointed Boswell to the commission.
