= Marshall Burt =

Wyoming state representative

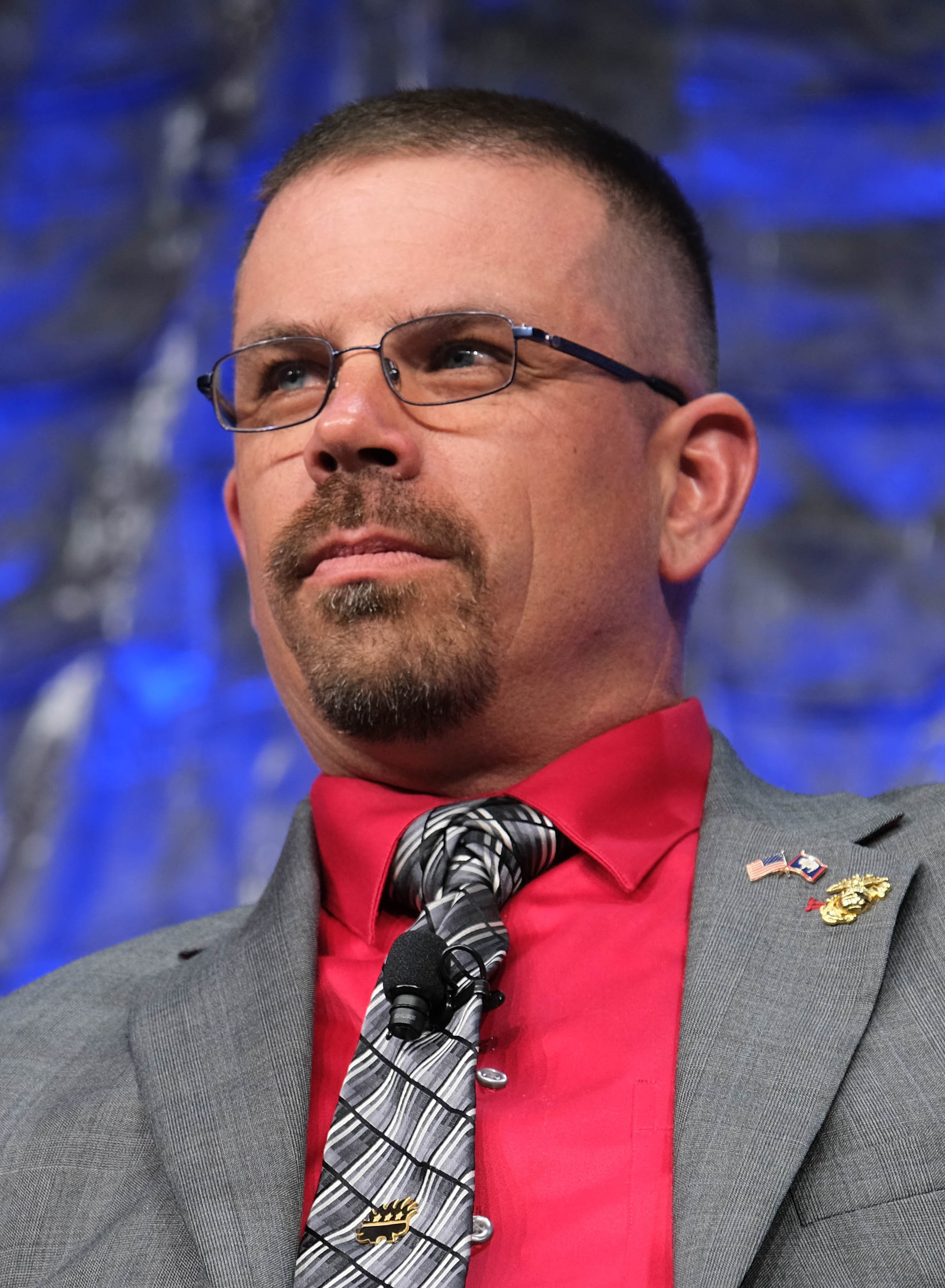
- Burt in 2021

Member of the Wyoming House of Representatives from the 39th district
- In office January 12, 2021 – January 10, 2023
- Preceded by: Stan Blake
- Succeeded by: Cody Wylie

Personal details
- Born: Marshall A. Burt; May 6, 1976 (age 50) Rochester, Minnesota, U.S.
- Party: Republican (2024–present)
- Other political affiliations: Libertarian (before 2024)
- Spouse: Theresa (divorced)
- Children: 2
- Occupation: Railroad inspector, politician
- Website: House website

Military service
- Allegiance: United States
- Branch/service: United States Marine Corps
- Service years: 1998–2007
- Rank: Staff sergeant
- Battles/wars: Iraq War; Operation Iraqi Freedom

Marshall A. Burt (born May 6, 1976) is an American politician who served in the Wyoming House of Representatives. A member of the Republican Party, Burt previously was a Libertarian while he represented the 39th district from 2021 to 2023. Burt was the first third-party candidate elected to the Wyoming Legislature in over 100 years.

== Early life and career ==
Marshall A. Burt was born in Rochester, Minnesota. He is a U.S. Marine Corps veteran, having served nine years in Okinawa, Japan, and in the Iraq War. He is employed by the Union Pacific Railroad as a track inspector.

== Wyoming House of Representatives ==
=== Elections ===
==== 2020 ====
In the 2020 Wyoming House of Representatives election, Burt was one of six Wyoming Libertarian candidates running in competitive districts. Burt ran in the 39th district. In a two-way race, Burt defeated his Democratic opponent, longtime incumbent Stan Blake, receiving 53.6% of the vote to Blake's 44.9%. Burt was the first Libertarian candidate to be elected to a state legislature since Steve Vaillancourt in 2000, and the first third-party candidate elected in Wyoming in over a century.

==== 2022 ====
Burt ran for re-election in the 2022 Wyoming House of Representatives election against Republican Cody Wylie. Burt was defeated by Wylie, receiving 25% of the vote to Wylie's 75%.

==== 2024 ====
In May 2024, Burt announced he would be running for his old seat as a Republican, after he left the Libertarian Party.

=== Tenure ===
In March 2021, Burt alongside a bipartisan group of house members, co–sponsored legislation that legalizes the sale, purchase, possession, and cultivation of cannabis, for any Wyoming citizen over the age of 21. The bill missed its deadline to be considered by the house after a committee voted to approve it, and subsequently died on the house floor. A bill identical to the March 2021 bill that would legalize cannabis was reintroduced in February 2022. Burt, once again, alongside a bipartisan group of house members, co–sponsored this legislation.

During that same month, Burt introduced legislation to help persons with disabilities extend their access to motorcycles. The bill was passed unanimously through both the Wyoming House and Senate, and was signed into law by Governor Mark Gordon. Speaker Eric Barlow also recognized the Libertarian Party as a minority party in the House, and Burt became the chairman of the Libertarian caucus.

=== Committee assignments ===
- Wyoming House Committee on Transportation, Highways and Military Affairs
  - Joint Subcommittee on Interstate Compact on Students of Military Families
- Wyoming House Committee on Corporations, Elections & Political Subdivisions

== Political positions ==
=== Gun policy ===
Burt is a gun-rights supporter and opposes expanding gun control regulations. He opposes all gun registration and instant background checks, and calls for "no permit or residency required for either open or concealed carry [in the state of Wyoming]".

=== Healthcare ===
Burt opposes federal and state vaccine mandates, calling them "unconstitutional".

== Personal life ==
Burt lives in Green River, Wyoming and has two children. He divorced his wife Theresa after leaving office. He is a Lutheran.

== Electoral history ==
2020 Wyoming House of Representatives election, District 39
Party	Candidate	Votes	%
Libertarian	Marshall Burt	1,696	53.6
Democratic	Stan Blake (incumbent)	1,421	44.9
Write-in		47	1.5
Total votes		3,164	100%
Libertarian gain from Democratic			

2022 Wyoming House of Representatives election, District 39
Party	Candidate	Votes	%	±%
Republican	Cody Wylie	1,763	74.4%	+74.4
Libertarian	Marshall Burt (incumbent)	586	24.7%	–28.9
Write-in		20	0.8%	–0.7
Total votes		2,369	100%	
Republican gain from Libertarian				

Wyoming House of Representatives
Preceded by Stan Blake	Member of the Wyoming House of Representatives from the 39th district 2021–2023	Succeeded by Cody Wylie
