= Cody Wylie =

American politician

Member of the Wyoming House of Representatives from the 39th district
- Incumbent
- Assumed office January 10, 2023
- Preceded by: Marshall Burt

Personal details
- Party: Republican
- Spouse: Marie Wiley
- Children: 1
- Education: Western Wyoming Community College; University of Wyoming (BS)
- Website: wylie4wyofromwyo.com

Cody Wylie is an American businessman and politician. He was elected to the Wyoming House of Representatives in the 2022 Wyoming House of Representatives General Election to the 39th district.

== Early life ==
Wylie was born in Rock Springs, Wyoming and graduated from the Western Wyoming Community College with a degree in Political Science in 2008. He would go on to graduate from the University of Wyoming earning a B.S. in Political Science in 2011. He would work as vice president for his father's construction company until 2020. He describes himself as a Christian.

== Career ==
In 2020 Wylie served on the Rock Springs Planning and Zoning Commission before running for the Wyoming House of Representatives for the 39th district. He ran against the incumbent Marshall Burt (L). Wylie ran on a campaign promoting conservative values as well as economic diversification and protecting Sweetwater County's standard of living.

He would go on to win with 75.1% of the vote. As representative, Wylie is a member of the House Corporations, Elections & Political Subdivisions committee and the House Transportation, Highways & Military Affairs committee. He has sponsored HB0153 which failed to pass, but would have increased Wyoming's Worker's compensation to be competitive with national levels.

== Electoral history ==
2022 Wyoming House of Representatives General Election
Party	Candidate	Votes	%
Republican	Cody Wylie	1,763	75.1%
Libertarian	Marshall Burt (incumbent)	586	24.9%
Total votes		2,349	100.0%
Republican gain from Libertarian			

== Personal life ==
Wiley is married to his wife, Marie, and has one child.
