= John Hastert =

American politician

Minority Leader of the Wyoming Senate
- In office 2011–2012
- Preceded by: Kathryn Sessions
- Succeeded by: Chris Rothfuss

Member of the Wyoming Senate from the 13th district
- In office January 9, 2007 – January 8, 2019
- Preceded by: Tex Boggs
- Succeeded by: Tom James

Member of the Wyoming House of Representatives from the 39th district
- In office March 2003 – January 9, 2007
- Preceded by: Christopher Boswell
- Succeeded by: Stan Blake

Personal details
- Born: John M. Hastert; November 20, 1958 (age 67) Euclid, Ohio
- Party: Democratic
- Children: Three
- Education: Western Wyoming Community College; Denver Automotive and Diesel College
- Profession: Mechanic

John M. Hastert (born November 20, 1958) is a former Democratic member of the Wyoming Senate, he represented the 13th district from 2007 to 2019. The 13th is located in Sweetwater County and includes Green River, Purple Sage, Clearview Acres and portions of Rock Springs. He served as the Senate Minority Caucus Chairman from 2013 until his promotion to Senate Minority Whip in 2017.

Prior to his service in the Senate, he served 1.5 terms in the Wyoming House of Representatives from 2003 through January 2007. Hastert was originally appointed by the Sweetwater County Commission in March 2003 to fill the vacant seat left by former majority leader Democrat Christopher Boswell, who left office to become newly elected Governor Dave Freudenthal's chief-of-staff.

== Wyoming Senate ==
Hastert was a member of several committees including the committees for Budgets and Revenue, Health and Human Services, Select Water, Labor & Economic Development and Senate Rules and Procedures as well as the Management Council, Task Force on State Penal Facilities and State Retirement Board Liaison.

== Sex trafficking and arrest ==
=== Sting ===
The Sweetwater County Sheriff's Office, Wyoming Division of Criminal Investigation and Homeland Security conducted an investigation into human trafficking at the Rock Springs Clarion Hotel, located at 2518 Foothill Boulevard. A homeland security investigator posed as a female prostitute on Skipthegames.com and was contacted by a person using a VoIP phone number. They began a conversation that started on April 28, 2021.

Hastert asked about the pricing and explained what specific acts he was interested in. Hastert was told to meet at 4:00 PM at the Rock Springs Clarion Hotel. Investigators arrived at the hotel and saw him wearing a blue shirt and blue jeans.

=== Arrest and trial ===
Investigators and officers were secretly inside the room. Hastert opened the door, and lieutenant Joseph Tomich grabbed Hastert by the shirt collar in an attempt to bring him into the room. Hastert resisted and attempted to fight the officer before being restrained to the wall.

Hastert was arrested on charges related to human trafficking and sex trafficking. He was charged with solicitation of prostitution, along with interference with a police officer. He entered not guilty pleas to the charges. He initially refused to identify himself but later verbally identified his name and date of birth.

== Electoral history ==
Wyoming's 13th Senate District election, 2006
Primary election
Party	Candidate	Votes	%
Democratic	John M. Hastert	1,531	66.9
Democratic	Ted L. Barney	756	33.1

Since Hastert's victory in the 2006 primary, he has run unopposed in three general elections ('06, '10, '14) and two primaries ('10, '14).

He also ran unopposed for his seat in the 39th district of the Wyoming House of Representatives in 2004 in both the primary and general elections.
