= Mike Greear =

American politician

Speaker pro tempore of the Wyoming House of Representatives
- In office January 12, 2021 – January 10, 2023
- Preceded by: Albert Sommers
- Succeeded by: Clark Stith

Member of the Wyoming House of Representatives from the 27th district
- In office January 11, 2011 – January 10, 2023
- Preceded by: Debbie Hammons
- Succeeded by: Martha Lawley

Personal details
- Born: March 1, 1967 (age 59) Sturgis, South Dakota, U.S.
- Party: Republican
- Education: Sheridan College; University of Wyoming (BS, JD)

Michael D. "Mike" Greear is an American politician who served as a Republican member of the Wyoming House of Representatives representing District 27 since January 11, 2011 to January 2023.

== Elections ==
- 2012 Greear was unopposed for both the August 21, 2012 Republican Primary, winning with 1,582 votes, and the November 6, 2012 General election, winning with 3,627 votes.
- 2010 When Democratic Representative Debbie Hammons retired and left the District 27 seat open, Greear was unopposed for both the August 17, 2010 Republican Primary, winning with 1,699 votes, and the November 2, 2010 General election, winning with 2,890 votes.
- Greear did not run for re-election in 2022.

Wyoming House of Representatives
Preceded by Albert Sommers	Speaker pro tempore of the Wyoming House of Representatives; 2021–2023	Succeeded by Clark Stith
