= Jim Blackburn (politician) =

American politician

Member of the Wyoming House of Representatives from the 42nd district
- In office January 5, 2015 – January 2, 2023
- Preceded by: Lynn Hutchings
- Succeeded by: Ben Hornok

Personal details
- Born: July 2, 1943 (age 83) Francis E. Warren Air Force Base, Cheyenne, Wyoming
- Party: Republican
- Spouse: Judy Blackburn
- Children: 3

Theodore "Jim" Blackburn (born 2 July 1943) is an American politician who served as a Republican member of the Wyoming House of Representatives representing District 42 from January 5, 2015 to January 2, 2023.

== Elections ==
=== 2010 ===
Blackburn challenged incumbent Republican Representative Pete Illoway in the Republican primary and lost, 58% to 42%.

=== 2014 ===
After incumbent Republican Representative Lynn Hutchings retired to run for the Wyoming Senate, Blackburn announced his candidacy. He defeated Tom Jones in the Republican primary with 55% of the vote. Blackburn defeated Democrat Gary Datus in the general election, 66% to 34%.

=== 2016 ===
Blackburn ran unopposed for the Republican nomination, and defeated Democrat Juliet Daniels in the general election with 68.3% of the vote.
