= Stan Blake =

American politician

Member of the Wyoming House of Representatives from the 39th district
- In office January 9, 2007 – January 12, 2021
- Preceded by: John Hastert
- Succeeded by: Marshall Burt

Personal details
- Born: November 8, 1954 (age 72) Canon City, Colorado, U.S.
- Party: Democratic
- Profession: Railroad Conductor

Stan Blake (born November 8, 1954) is an American railroad conductor and politician, and a former Wyoming state legislator. A member of the Democratic Party, Blake represented the 39th district in the Wyoming House of Representatives from 2007 to 2021. In 2020, he was defeated by fellow Union Pacific employee and Green River resident Marshall Burt, a Libertarian.

Blake is employed by the Union Pacific Railroad and lives in Green River, Wyoming, with his wife, Terri June Blake.
