= 64th Wyoming State Legislature =

Term of state legislature in Wyoming, US

←	63rd State Legislature	65th State Legislature	→
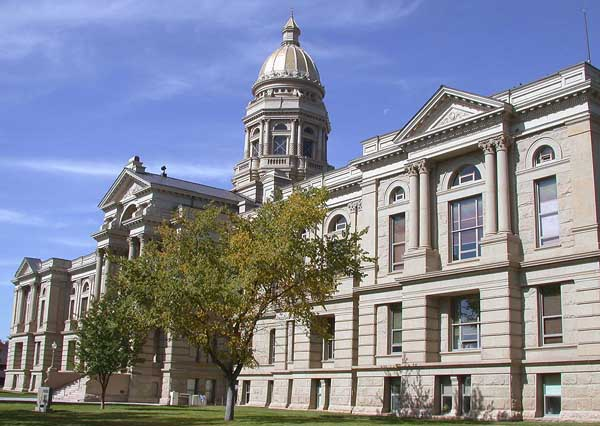
- Wyoming State Capitol

Overview
- Legislative body: Wyoming Legislature
- Jurisdiction: Wyoming, United States
- Meeting place: Wyoming State Capitol
- Term: 2017–2019

Wyoming Senate
- Members: 30 Senators
- Senate President: Eli Bebout (R)
- Majority Leader: Drew Perkins (R)
- Minority Leader: Chris Rothfuss (D)
- Party control: Republican

Wyoming House of Representatives
- Members: 60 Representatives
- Speaker of the House: Steve Harshman (R)
- Majority Leader: David Miller (R)
- Minority Leader: Cathy Connolly (D)
- Party control: Republican

The 64th Wyoming State Legislature was a former meeting of the Wyoming Legislature lasting from January 10, 2017 to January 10, 2019.

The Republican Party held a supermajority in the legislature, which began meeting in 2013; 51 of the 60 seats in the House and 26 of the 30 seats in the Senate are held by Republicans.

== Senate ==
Affiliation	Party (Shading indicates majority caucus)		Total	
Affiliation	Republican	Democratic	Total	Vacant
End of 59th Legislature	23	7	30	0
End of 60th Legislature	23	7	30	0
End of 61st Legislature	26	4	30	0
End of 62nd Legislature	26	4	30	0
End of 63rd Legislature	26	4	30	0
Beginning of 64th Legislature	27	3	30	0
Latest voting share	90%	10%		

Position	Name	Party
President of the Senate	Eli Bebout	Republican
Majority Leader	Drew Perkins	Republican
Senate Vice President	Michael Von Flatern	Republican
Minority Leader	Chris Rothfuss	Democratic
Minority Whip	John Hastert	Democratic

=== Members of the Wyoming Senate ===
District	Representative	Party	Residence	Counties represented
1	Ogden Driskill	Republican	Devils Tower	Converse, Crook, Goshen, Niobrara, Weston
2	Brian Boner	Republican	Douglas	Converse, Platte
3	Curt Meier	Republican	LaGrange	Goshen, Platte
4	Tara Nethercott	Republican	Cheyenne	Laramie
5	Fred Emerich	Republican	Cheyenne	Laramie
6	Anthony Bouchard	Republican	Carpenter	Laramie
7	Stephan Pappas	Republican	Cheyenne	Laramie
8	Affie Ellis	Republican	Cheyenne	Laramie
9	Chris Rothfuss	Democratic	Laramie	Albany
10	Glenn Moniz	Republican	Laramie	Albany
11	Larry S. Hicks	Republican	Baggs	Albany, Carbon
12	Liisa Anselmi-Dalton	Democratic	Rock Springs	Fremont, Sweetwater
13	John Hastert	Democratic	Green River	Sweetwater
14	Fred Baldwin	Republican	Kemmerer	Lincoln, Sublette, Sweetwater, Uinta
15	Paul Barnard	Republican	Evanston	Uinta
16	Dan Dockstader	Republican	Afton	Lincoln, Sublette, Teton
17	Leland Christensen	Republican	Alta	Fremont, Teton
18	Hank Coe	Republican	Cody	Park
19	R. Ray Peterson	Republican	Cowley	Big Horn, Park
20	Wyatt Agar	Republican	Thermopolis	Big Horn, Hot Springs, Park, Washakie
21	Bruce Burns	Republican	Sheridan	Sheridan
22	Dave Kinskey	Republican	Sheridan	Sheridan, Johnson
23	Jeff Wasserburger	Republican	Gillette	Campbell
24	Michael Von Flatern	Republican	Gillette	Campbell
25	Cale Case	Republican	Lander	Fremont
26	Eli Bebout	Republican	Riverton	Fremont
27	Bill Landen	Republican	Casper	Natrona
28	James Lee Anderson	Republican	Casper	Natrona
29	Drew Perkins	Republican	Casper	Natrona
30	Charles Scott	Republican	Casper	Natrona

== House ==
Affiliation	Party (Shading indicates majority caucus)		Total	
Affiliation	Republican	Democratic	Total	Vacant
End of the 59th Legislature	43	17	60	0
End of the 60th Legislature	41	19	60	0
End of the 61st Legislature	50	10	60	0
End of the 62nd Legislature	52	8	60	0
End of the 63rd Legislature	51	9	60	0
December 23, 2016	50	9	60	1
January 4, 2017	51	9	60	0
Beginning of the 64th Legislature	51	9	60	0
May 15, 2017	50	9	60	1
June 5, 2017	51	9	60	0
September 14, 2017	50	9	60	1
October 13, 2017	51	9	60	0
Latest voting share	85%	15%		

=== Leadership ===
Position	Name	Party	District
Speaker of the House	Steve Harshman	Rep	37
Majority Leader	David Miller	Rep	55
Speaker pro tempore	Donald Burkhart	Rep	15
Majority Whip	Albert Sommers	Rep	20
Minority Leader	Cathy Connolly	Dem	13
Minority Whip	Charles Pelkey	Dem	45
Minority Caucus Chairman	John Freeman	Dem	60

=== Members of the Wyoming House of Representatives ===
District	Representative	Party	Residence	Counties represented
1	Tyler Lindholm	Rep	Sundance	Crook, Weston
2	Hans Hunt	Rep	Newcastle	Converse, Goshen, Niobrara, Weston
3	Eric Barlow	Rep	Gillette	Converse, Campbell
4	Dan Kirkbride	Rep	Chugwater	Goshen
5	Cheri Steinmetz	Rep	Lingle	Goshen, Platte
6	Aaron Clausen	Rep	Douglas	Converse
7	Sue Wilson	Rep	Cheyenne	Laramie
8	Bob Nicholas	Rep	Cheyenne	Laramie
9	Landon Brown	Rep	Cheyenne	Laramie
10	John Eklund, Jr.	Rep	Cheyenne	Laramie
11	Jared Olsen	Rep	Cheyenne	Laramie
12	Lars Lone	Rep	Cheyenne	Laramie
13	Cathy Connolly	Dem	Laramie	Albany
14	Dan Furphy	Rep	Laramie	Albany
15	Donald Burkhart	Rep	Rawlins	Carbon
16	Mike Gierau	Dem	Jackson	Teton
17	JoAnn Dayton	Dem	Rock Springs	Sweetwater
18	Thomas Crank	Rep	Kemmerer	Sweetwater, Uinta
19	Danny Eyre	Rep	Lyman	Uinta
20	Albert Sommers	Rep	Pinedale	Sublette
21	Evan Simpson	Rep	Afton	Lincoln
22	Marti Halverson	Rep	Etna	Lincoln, Sublette, Teton
23	Andy Schwartz	Dem	Jackson	Fremont, Teton
24	Scott Court	Rep	Cody	Park
25	Dan Laursen	Rep	Powell	Park
26	Jamie Flitner	Rep	Greybull	Big Horn, Park
27	Mike Greear	Rep	Worland	Washakie
28	Nathan Winters	Rep	Thermopolis	Big Horn, Hot Springs, Park, Fremont
29	Mark Kinner	Rep	Sheridan	Sheridan
30	Mark Jennings	Rep	Sheridan	Sheridan
31	Scott Clem	Rep	Gillette	Campbell
32	Timothy Hallinan	Rep	Gillette	Campbell
33	Jim Allen	Rep	Lander	Fremont
34	Tim Salazar	Rep	Dubois	Fremont
35	Joe MacGuire	Rep	Casper	Natrona
36	Debbie Bovee	Dem	Casper	Natrona
37	Steve Harshman	Rep	Casper	Natrona
38	Tom Walters	Rep	Casper	Natrona
39	Stan Blake	Dem	Green River	Sweetwater
40	Mike Madden	Rep	Buffalo	Johnson, Sheridan
41	Bill Henderson	Rep	Cheyenne	Laramie
42	Jim Blackburn	Rep	Cheyenne	Laramie
43	Dan Zwonitzer	Rep	Cheyenne	Laramie
44	James W. Byrd	Dem	Cheyenne	Laramie
45	Charles Pelkey	Dem	Laramie	Albany
46	Bill Haley	Rep	Centennial	Albany
47	Jerry Paxton	Rep	Encampment	Albany, Carbon, Sweetwater
48	Clark Stith	Rep	Rock Springs	Sweetwater
49	Garry Piiparinen	Rep	Evanston	Uinta
50	David Northrup	Rep	Powell	Park
51	Bo Biteman	Rep	Ranchester	Sheridan
52	William Pownall	Rep	Gillette	Campbell
53	Roy Edwards	Rep	Gillette	Campbell
54	Lloyd Larsen	Rep	Lander	Fremont
55	David Miller	Rep	Riverton	Fremont
56	Jerry Obermueller	Rep	Casper	Natrona
57	Chuck Gray	Rep	Casper	Natrona
58	Pat Sweeney	Rep	Casper	Natrona
59	Bunky Loucks	Rep	Casper	Natrona
60	John Freeman	Dem	Green River	Sweetwater
