= List of Wyoming state legislatures =

The legislature of the U.S. state of Wyoming has convened many times since statehood became effective on July 10, 1890.

== Legislatures ==
| Number | Start date | End date | Last election |
|---|---|---|---|
| 1st Wyoming State Legislature | 1890 | | |
| 2nd Wyoming State Legislature | 1893 | | |
| 3rd Wyoming State Legislature | 1895 | | |
| 4th Wyoming State Legislature | 1897 | | |
| 5th Wyoming State Legislature | 1899 | | |
| 6th Wyoming State Legislature | 1901 | | |
| 7th Wyoming State Legislature | 1903 | | |
| 8th Wyoming State Legislature | 1905 | | |
| 9th Wyoming State Legislature | 1907 | | |
| 10th Wyoming State Legislature | 1909 | | |
| 11th Wyoming State Legislature | 1911 | | |
| 12th Wyoming State Legislature | 1913 | | |
| 13th Wyoming State Legislature | 1915 | | |
| 14th Wyoming State Legislature | 1917 | | |
| 15th Wyoming State Legislature | 1919 | | |
| 16th Wyoming State Legislature | 1921 | | |
| 17th Wyoming State Legislature | 1923 | | |
| 18th Wyoming State Legislature | 1925 | | |
| 19th Wyoming State Legislature | 1927 | | |
| 20th Wyoming State Legislature | 1929 | | |
| 21st Wyoming State Legislature | 1931 | | |
| 22nd Wyoming State Legislature | 1933 | | |
| 23rd Wyoming State Legislature | 1935 | | |
| 24th Wyoming State Legislature | 1937 | | |
| 25th Wyoming State Legislature | 1939 | | |
| 26th Wyoming State Legislature | 1941 | | |
| 27th Wyoming State Legislature | 1942 | | |
| 28th Wyoming State Legislature | January 9, 1945 | | |
| 29th Wyoming State Legislature | January 14, 1947 | | |
| 30th Wyoming State Legislature | January 11, 1949 | | |
| 31st Wyoming State Legislature | 1951 | | |
| 32nd Wyoming State Legislature | 1953 | | |
| 33rd Wyoming State Legislature | 1955 | | |
| 34th Wyoming State Legislature | 1957 | | |
| 35th Wyoming State Legislature | 1959 | | |
| 36th Wyoming State Legislature | 1961 | | |
| 37th Wyoming State Legislature | 1963 | | |
| 38th Wyoming State Legislature | 1965 | | |
| 39th Wyoming State Legislature | 1967 | | |
| 40th Wyoming State Legislature | 1969 | | |
| 41st Wyoming State Legislature | 1971 | | |
| 42nd Wyoming State Legislature | January 9, 1973 | | |
| 43rd Wyoming State Legislature | 1975 | | |
| 44th Wyoming State Legislature | 1977 | | |
| 45th Wyoming State Legislature | 1979 | | |
| 46th Wyoming State Legislature | 1981 | | |
| 47th Wyoming State Legislature | 1983 | | |
| 48th Wyoming State Legislature | 1985 | | |
| 49th Wyoming State Legislature | 1987 | | |
| 50th Wyoming State Legislature | 1989 | | |
| 51st Wyoming State Legislature | 1991 | | |
| 52nd Wyoming State Legislature | 1993 | | |
| 53rd Wyoming State Legislature | 1995 | | |
| 54th Wyoming State Legislature | 1997 | | |
| 55th Wyoming State Legislature | 1999 | | |
| 56th Wyoming State Legislature | 2001 | | |
| 57th Wyoming State Legislature | 2003 | | |
| 58th Wyoming State Legislature | 2005 | | |
| 59th Wyoming State Legislature | January 9, 2007 | | |
| 60th Wyoming State Legislature | January 13, 2009 | | |
| 61st Wyoming State Legislature | January 11, 2011 | | |
| 62nd Wyoming State Legislature | 2013 | | |
| 63rd Wyoming State Legislature | 2015 | | |
| 64th Wyoming State Legislature | 2017 | | November 2016: House, Senate |
| 65th Wyoming State Legislature | 2019 | | November 2018: House, Senate |
| 66th Wyoming State Legislature | 2021 | | November 2020: House, Senate |
| 67th Wyoming State Legislature | 2023 | | November 2022: House, Senate |
| 68th Wyoming Legislature | 2025 | | November 5, 2024: House, Senate |

== See also ==
- List of governors of Wyoming
- Constitution of Wyoming
- Politics of Wyoming
- Elections in Wyoming
- Wyoming State Capitol
- Lists of United States state legislative sessions
