= Robert McKim (Wyoming politician) =

American politician (1946–2018)

Member of the Wyoming House of Representatives from the 21st district
- In office January 13, 2009 – September 14, 2017
- Preceded by: Dan Dockstader
- Succeeded by: Evan Simpson

Personal details
- Born: January 18, 1946 Laramie, Wyoming, U.S.
- Died: February 19, 2018 (aged 72)
- Party: Republican
- Education: Brigham Young University

Robert M. McKim (January 18, 1946 – February 19, 2018) was an American politician and a Republican former member of the Wyoming House of Representatives representing District 21 from January 2009 until his resignation on September 14, 2017, for health reasons. He died on February 19, 2018, at the age of 72.

== Education ==
McKim earned his Bachelor of Science from Brigham Young University.

== Elections ==
- 2012 McKim was unopposed for both the August 21, 2012 Republican Primary, winning with 1,327 votes, and the November 6, 2012 General election, winning with 3,814 votes.
- 2006 When Republican Representative and Speaker of the Wyoming House of Representatives Randall Luthi retired and left the District 21 seat open, McKim sought the seat in the August 22, 2006 Republican Primary, but lost to Dan Dockstader, who was unopposed for the November 7, 2006 General election.
- 2008 With Representative Dockstader running for Wyoming Senate, McKim was unopposed for both the August 19, 2008 Republican Primary, winning with 1,481 votes, and the November 4, 2008 General election, winning with 4,467 votes.
- 2010 McKim was unopposed for both the August 17, 2010 Republican Primary, winning with 2,475 votes, and the November 2, 2010 General election, winning with 3,473 votes.
