= Wyoming's 58th House of Representatives district =

American legislative district

Wyoming's 58th State House of Representatives district
- Wyoming's 58th House of Representatives district as of 2022
Representative
Bill Allemand; R–Midwest
- Demographics: 85% White; 11% Hispanic; 1% Other; 3% Multiracial
- Population (2022): 9,919

Wyoming's 58th House of Representatives district is one of 62 districts in the Wyoming House of Representatives. The district encompasses part of Natrona County. It is represented by Republican Representative Bill Allemand of Midwest.

In 1992, the state of Wyoming switched from electing state legislators by county to a district-based system.

== List of members representing the district ==
Representative	Party	Term	Note
Glenda F. Stark	Republican	1993 – 1997	Elected in 1992. Re-elected in 1994.
Ann Robinson	Democratic	1997 – 2007	Elected in 1996. Re-elected in 1998. Re-elected in 2000. Re-elected in 2002. Re-elected in 2004.
Lisa Shepperson	Republican	2007 – 2011	Elected in 2006. Re-elected in 2008. Re-elected in 2010. Resigned in 2011.
Tom Reeder	Republican	2011 – 2017	Appointed in 2011. Re-elected in 2012. Re-elected in 2014.
Pat Sweeney	Republican	2017 – 2023	Elected in 2016. Re-elected in 2018. Re-elected in 2020.
Bill Allemand	Republican	2023 – present	Elected in 2022. Elected in 2024.

== Recent election results ==
=== 2014 ===
House district 58 general election
Party	Candidate	Votes	%
Republican	Tom Reeder (incumbent)	1,585	98.14%
Write-ins		30	1.85%
Total votes		1,615	100.0%
Invalid or blank votes		413	
Republican hold			

=== 2016 ===
House district 58 general election
Party	Candidate	Votes	%
Republican	Pat Sweeney	2,407	76.21%
Democratic	Michael Wade McDaniel Jr.	482	15.26%
Independent	Joe Porambo	250	7.91%
Write-ins		19	0.60%
Total votes		3,158	100.0%
Invalid or blank votes		214	
Republican hold			

=== 2018 ===
House district 58 general election
Party	Candidate	Votes	%
Republican	Pat Sweeney (incumbent)	1,883	96.16%
Write-ins		75	3.83%
Total votes		1,958	100.0%
Invalid or blank votes		356	
Republican hold			

=== 2020 ===
House district 58 general election
Party	Candidate	Votes	%
Republican	Pat Sweeney (incumbent)	2,725	80.33%
Libertarian	Joseph S. Porambo	646	19.04%
Write-ins		21	0.61%
Total votes		3,392	100.0%
Invalid or blank votes		242	
Republican hold			

=== 2022 ===
House district 58 general election
Party	Candidate	Votes	%
Republican	Bill Allemand	2,024	96.93%
Write-ins		64	3.06%
Total votes		2,088	100.0%
Invalid or blank votes		321	
Republican hold			

=== 2024 ===
House district 58 general election
Party	Candidate	Votes	%
Republican	Bill Allemand (incumbent)	3,055	96.98%
Write-ins		95	3.01%
Total votes		3,150	100.0%
Invalid or blank votes		586	
Republican hold			

== Historical district boundaries ==
Map	Description	Apportionment Plan	Notes
	Natrona County (part)	1992 Apportionment Plan	
	Natrona County (part)	2002 Apportionment Plan	
	Natrona County (part)	2012 Apportionment Plan	
