= Marlene Simons =

American politician

Marlene J. Simons

Member of the Wyoming House of Representatives
- In office 1979–2003
- Preceded by: Unknown
- Succeeded by: Mark Semlek
- Constituency: Crook County (1979-1992); 1st district (1993-2003)

Personal details
- Born: July 1, 1935 Deadwood, South Dakota, U.S.
- Died: March 13, 2006 (aged 70) Wyoming, U.S.
- Party: Republican
- Spouse: Franklin E. Simons
- Children: 2 biological, 1 step-child
- Education: University of Wyoming
- Profession: businesswoman, rancher

Marlene Juanita Simons (née Mills; July 1, 1935 – March 13, 2006) was an American Republican politician and a former member of the Wyoming House of Representatives. She served from 1979 until 2003. From 1979 to 1992, she represented Crook County. In 1992, the Wyoming Legislature switched from a county-based system to a numbered district-based system. From 1993 to 2003, she represented the 1st district.
