= Wyoming's 21st House of Representatives district =

American legislative district

Wyoming's 21st State House of Representatives district
- Wyoming's 21st House of Representatives district as of 2022
Representative
McKay Erickson; R–Afton
- Demographics: 92% White; 5% Hispanic; 3% Multiracial
- Population (2022): 9,918

Wyoming's 21st House of Representatives district is one of 62 districts in the Wyoming House of Representatives. The district encompasses part of Lincoln County. It is represented by Republican Representative McKay Erickson of Afton.

In 1992, the state of Wyoming switched from electing state legislators by county to a district-based system.

== List of members representing the district ==
Representative	Party	Term	Note
Clyde Wolfley	Republican	1993 – 1995	Elected in 1992.
Randall Luthi	Republican	1995 – 2007	Elected in 1994. Re-elected in 1996. Re-elected in 1998. Re-elected in 2000. Re-elected in 2002. Re-elected in 2004.
Dan Dockstader	Republican	2007 – 2009	Elected in 2006.
Robert McKim	Republican	2009 – 2017	Elected in 2008. Re-elected in 2010. Re-elected in 2012. Re-elected in 2014. Re-elected in 2016. Resigned in 2017.
Evan Simpson	Republican	2017 – 2023	Appointed in 2017. Re-elected in 2018. Re-elected in 2020.
Lane Allred	Republican	2023 – 2025	Elected in 2022.
McKay Erickson	Republican	2025 – present	Elected in 2024.

== Recent election results ==
=== 2014 ===
House district 21 general election
Party	Candidate	Votes	%
Republican	Robert McKim (Incumbent)	2,606	99.38%
Write-ins		16	0.61%
Total votes		2,622	100.0%
Invalid or blank votes		255	
Republican hold			

=== 2016 ===
House district 21 general election
Party	Candidate	Votes	%
Republican	Robert McKim (Incumbent)	3,832	91.36%
Democratic	David Fogle	344	8.20%
Write-ins		18	0.42%
Total votes		4,194	100.0%
Invalid or blank votes		123	
Republican hold			

=== 2018 ===
House district 21 general election
Party	Candidate	Votes	%
Republican	Evan Simpson (Incumbent)	3,184	99.46%
Write-ins		17	0.53%
Total votes		3,201	100.0%
Invalid or blank votes		267	
Republican hold			

=== 2020 ===
House district 21 general election
Party	Candidate	Votes	%
Republican	Evan Simpson (Incumbent)	4,705	98.63%
Write-ins		65	1.36%
Total votes		4,770	100.0%
Invalid or blank votes		331	
Republican hold			

=== 2022 ===
House district 21 general election
Party	Candidate	Votes	%
Republican	Lane Allred	3,066	96.84%
Write-ins		100	3.15%
Total votes		3,166	100.0%
Invalid or blank votes		290	
Republican hold			

=== 2024 ===
House district 21 general election
Party	Candidate	Votes	%
Republican	McKay Erickson	4,947	99.03%
Write-ins		48	0.96%
Total votes		4,995	100.0%
Invalid or blank votes		340	
Republican hold			

== Historical district boundaries ==
Map	Description	Apportionment Plan	Notes
	Lincoln County (part)	1992 Apportionment Plan	
	Lincoln County (part)	2002 Apportionment Plan	
	Lincoln County (part)	2012 Apportionment Plan	
