= Mark Semlek =

American politician (born 1951)

Member of the Wyoming House of Representatives from the 1st district
- In office January 2003 – January 2015
- Preceded by: Marlene Simons
- Succeeded by: Tyler Lindholm

Personal details
- Born: April 17, 1951 (age 75) Gillette, Wyoming, U.S.
- Party: Republican
- Education: University of Wyoming (BS, MS)

Mark A. Semlek (born April 17, 1951) is an American politician and a former Republican member of the Wyoming House of Representatives representing District 1. He served from 2003 until 2015.

== Education ==
Semlek earned his BS and MS from the University of Wyoming.

== Elections ==
- 2012 Semlek was unopposed for both the August 21, 2012 Republican Primary, winning with 1,973 votes, and the November 6, 2012 General election, winning with 4,455 votes.
- 2002 When Republican Representative Marlene Simons was term limited (since repealed) and left the District 1 seat open, Semlek won the three-way August 20, 2002 Republican Primary with 1,316 votes (45.1%), and was unopposed for the November 5, 2002 General election, winning with 3,486 votes.
- 2004 Semlek won the August 17, 2004 Republican Primary with 1,867 votes (75.4%) against Ogden Driskill, and was unopposed for the November 2, 2004 General election, winning with 4,222 votes; Driskill later served in the Wyoming Senate.
- 2006 Semlek was unopposed for both the August 22, 2006 Republican Primary, winning with 2,214 votes, and the November 7, 2006 General election, winning with 3,525 votes.
- 2008 Semlek was unopposed for both the August 19, 2008 Republican Primary, winning with 1,956 votes, and the November 4, 2008 General election, winning with 4,395 votes.
- 2010 Semlek was unopposed for the August 17, 2010 Republican Primary, winning with 2,463 votes, and won the November 2, 2010 General election with 3,595 (82.7%) votes against Democratic nominee Stan Dodson, who had run for the seat in 2000.
- 2014, Mark Semlek announced he would not run for re-election. Tyler Lindholm, Bruce Brown, and Ted Davis all filed to run for the Republican nomination. The primary was won by Tyler Lindholm, who went on to be unopposed in the general election.
