= Wyoming's 54th House of Representatives district =

American legislative district

Wyoming's 54th State House of Representatives district
- Wyoming's 54th House of Representatives district as of 2022
Representative
Lloyd Larsen; R–Lander
- Demographics: 83% White; 1% Black; 5% Hispanic; 6% Native American; 4% Multiracial
- Population (2022): 9,490

Wyoming's 54th House of Representatives district is one of 62 districts in the Wyoming House of Representatives. The district encompasses part of Fremont County. It is represented by Republican Representative Lloyd Larsen of Lander.

In 1992, the state of Wyoming switched from electing state legislators by county to a district-based system.

== List of members representing the district ==
Representative	Party	Term	Note
Cale Case	Republican	1992 – 1999	Elected in 1992. Re-elected in 1994. Re-elected in 1996.
Del McOmie	Republican	1999 – 2013	Elected in 1998. Re-elected in 2000. Re-elected in 2002. Re-elected in 2004. Re-elected in 2006. Re-elected in 2008. Re-elected in 2010.
Lloyd Larsen	Republican	2013 – present	Elected in 2012. Re-elected in 2014. Re-elected in 2016. Re-elected in 2018. Re-elected in 2020. Re-elected in 2022. Re-elected in 2024.

== Recent election results ==
=== 2014 ===
House district 54 general election
Party	Candidate	Votes	%
Republican	Lloyd Larsen (incumbent)	2,778	98.16%
Write-ins		52	1.83%
Total votes		2,830	100.0%
Invalid or blank votes		972	
Republican hold			

=== 2016 ===
House district 54 general election
Party	Candidate	Votes	%
Republican	Lloyd Larsen (incumbent)	2,780	56.60%
Democratic	Julia Stuble	2,120	43.16%
Write-ins		11	0.22%
Total votes		4,911	100.0%
Invalid or blank votes		138	
Republican hold			

=== 2018 ===
House district 54 general election
Party	Candidate	Votes	%
Republican	Lloyd Larsen (incumbent)	2,305	52.58%
Democratic	Mark Calhoun	2,073	47.29%
Write-ins		5	0.11%
Total votes		4,383	100.0%
Invalid or blank votes		122	
Republican hold			

=== 2020 ===
House district 54 general election
Party	Candidate	Votes	%
Republican	Lloyd Larsen (incumbent)	3,148	58.35%
Democratic	Kevin Wilson	2,244	41.59%
Write-ins		3	0.05%
Total votes		5,395	100.0%
Invalid or blank votes		119	
Republican hold			

=== 2022 ===
House district 54 general election
Party	Candidate	Votes	%
Republican	Lloyd Larsen (incumbent)	2,645	62.60%
Independent	Jeff Martin	1,560	36.92%
Write-ins		20	0.47%
Total votes		4,225	100.0%
Invalid or blank votes		212	
Republican hold			

=== 2024 ===
House district 54 general election
Party	Candidate	Votes	%
Republican	Lloyd Larsen (incumbent)	3,821	91.14%
Write-ins		371	8.85%
Total votes		4,192	100.0%
Invalid or blank votes		1073	
Republican hold			

== Historical district boundaries ==
Map	Description	Apportionment Plan	Notes
	Fremont County (part)	1992 Apportionment Plan	
	Fremont County (part)	2002 Apportionment Plan	
	Fremont County (part)	2012 Apportionment Plan	
