= Tom Reeder =

American politician (born 1949)

Member of the Wyoming House of Representatives from the 58th district
- In office September 27, 2011 – January 10, 2017
- Preceded by: Lisa Shepperson
- Succeeded by: Pat Sweeney

Personal details
- Born: December 31, 1949 (age 76) Miami, Florida, U.S.
- Party: Republican
- Education: Metropolitan State College; Miami Dade Junior College; Florida Institute of Technology; Embry–Riddle Aeronautical University
- Website: treederhd58.com

Tom Reeder, Jr. (born December 31, 1949, in Miami, Florida) is an American politician and a Republican member of the Wyoming House of Representatives representing District 58 since September 27, 2011, when he was appointed by the Natrona County Commission to fill the vacancy caused by the resignation of Representative Lisa Shepperson.

== Education ==
Reeder attended Metropolitan State College, Miami Dade Junior College, the Florida Institute of Technology, and Embry–Riddle Aeronautical University.

== Elections ==
- 2012 Reeder was unopposed for both the August 21, 2012 Republican Primary, winning with 735 votes, and the November 6, 2012 General election, winning with 2,439 votes.
