= Wyoming's 1st House of Representatives district =

American legislative district

Wyoming's 1st State House of Representatives district
- Wyoming's 1st House of Representatives district as of 2022
Representative
Chip Neiman; R–Hulett
- Demographics: 92% White; 2% Hispanic; 1% Asian; 4% Multiracial
- Population (2023) • Citizens of voting age: 9,688; 7,593

Wyoming's 1st House of Representatives district is one of 62 districts in the Wyoming House of Representatives. It has been represented by Republican Chip Neiman since 2021, who has served as Speaker of the Wyoming House of Representatives since 2025.

== History ==
Numbered legislative districts did not exist in Wyoming prior to 1992, as all House districts were apportioned among the 23 counties of Wyoming, with each county electing between one and nine representatives using plurality block voting. The apportionment being strictly based on counties led to the state house map having a representational deviation of over 83 percent, violating the principle of one man, one vote. This setup was struck down by the courts in Gorin v. Karpan, and Wyoming has used a single-member district plan ever since.

== Geography ==
House District 1 currently contains two counties in northeastern Wyoming:

- Crook
- Weston (partial)

House District 1, along with House District 52, is nested into Senate District 1.

== List of members ==
Representative	Party	Term	Note
Marlene Simons	Republican	1993 – 2003	Elected in 1992. Re-elected in 1994. Re-elected in 1996. Re-elected in 1998. Re-elected in 2000.
Mark Semlek	Republican	2003 – 2015	Elected in 2002. Re-elected in 2004. Re-elected in 2006. Re-elected in 2008. Re-elected in 2010. Re-elected in 2012.
Tyler Lindholm	Republican	2015 – 2021	Elected in 2014. Re-elected in 2016. Re-elected in 2018.
Chip Neiman	Republican	2021 – present	Elected in 2020. Re-elected in 2022. Re-elected in 2024.
Troy Claycomb	Republican	2027 – member-elect	Elected in 2026.

== General election results ==
=== 2022–present ===
2024 Wyoming House of Representatives District 1 general election
Party	Candidate	Votes	%	±%
Republican	Chip Neiman (inc.)	5,096	97.62%	+0.38%
Write-in		124	2.38%	−0.38%
Total votes		5,220	100.00%	
Republican hold				

2022 Wyoming House of Representatives District 1 general election
Party	Candidate	Votes	%	±%
Republican	Chip Neiman (inc.)	3,876	97.24%	+6.04%
Write-in		110	2.76%	−6.04%
Total votes		3,986	100.00%	
Republican hold				

=== 2012–2022 ===
2020 Wyoming House of Representatives District 1 general election
Party	Candidate	Votes	%	±%
Republican	Chip Neiman	4,706	91.20%	−7.07%
Write-in		454	8.80%	+7.07%
Total votes		5,160	100.00%	
Republican hold				

2018 Wyoming House of Representatives District 1 general election
Party	Candidate	Votes	%	±%
Republican	Tyler Lindholm (inc.)	3,688	98.27%	+8.45%
Write-in		65	1.73%	+1.50%
Total votes		3,753	100.00%	
Republican hold				

2016 Wyoming House of Representatives District 1 general election
Party	Candidate	Votes	%	±%
Republican	Tyler Lindholm (inc.)	4,606	89.82%	−8.41%
Democratic	Randy Leinen	510	9.95%	New
Write-in		12	0.23%	−1.54%
Total votes		5,128	100.00%	
Republican hold				

2014 Wyoming House of Representatives District 1 general election
Party	Candidate	Votes	%	±%
Republican	Tyler Lindholm	3,173	98.23%	−0.75%
Write-in		57	1.77%	+0.75%
Total votes		3,230	100.00%	
Republican hold				

2012 Wyoming House of Representatives District 1 general election
Party	Candidate	Votes	%	±%
Republican	Mark Semlek (inc.)	4,455	98.98%	
Write-in		46	1.02%	
Total votes		4,501	100.00%	
Republican hold				

== Historical district boundaries ==
Map	Description	Apportionment Plan	Notes
	Crook County; Weston County (part)	1992 Apportionment Plan	
	Crook County; Weston County (part)	2002 Apportionment Plan	
	Crook County; Weston County (part)	2012 Apportionment Plan	
