= Lisa Shepperson =

American politician

Member of the Wyoming House of Representatives from the 58th district
- In office 2007–2011
- Preceded by: Ann Robinson
- Succeeded by: Tom Reeder

Personal details
- Born: September 1, 1975 (age 51) Casper, Wyoming, U.S.
- Party: Republican
- Education: University of Wyoming
- Profession: Rancher

Lisa Shepperson (born September 1, 1975) is a Republican member of the Wyoming House of Representatives, representing the 58th district since 2007. Her district covers northern Casper, Wyoming. She is a member of the House Judiciary Committee.

Shepperson was elected in November 2006, 61%-39%, and considers herself a conservative.
