= Del McOmie =

American politician

Member of the Wyoming House of Representatives from the 54th district
- In office January 12, 1999 – January 8, 2013
- Preceded by: Cale Case
- Succeeded by: Lloyd Larsen

Personal details
- Born: October 26, 1935 (age 90) Lander, Wyoming
- Party: Republican

Del McOmie (born October 26, 1935) is an American politician who served in the Wyoming House of Representatives from the 54th district from 1999 to 2013.
