= Lane Allred =

American politician

Member of the Wyoming House of Representatives from the 21st district
- In office January 10, 2023 – January 2025
- Preceded by: Evan Simpson
- Succeeded by: McKay Erickson

Personal details
- Born: Afton, Wyoming, U.S.
- Party: Republican
- Education: Brigham Young University; University of Phoenix

Lane Allred is an American politician who served as a Republican member of the Wyoming House of Representatives representing the 21st district from January 10, 2023 to January 2025.

== Political career ==
When incumbent Republican representative Evan Simpson announced his retirement, Allred declared his candidacy and won the Republican primary on August 16, 2022 with 59% of the vote, defeating fellow Republican candidate Jeremiah Hardesty. He then won the general election on November 8, 2022 unopposed.
