= Troy McKeown =

American politician

Member of the Wyoming Senate from the 24th district
- Incumbent
- Assumed office January 4, 2021
- Preceded by: Michael Von Flatern

Personal details
- Born: Cheyenne, Wyoming, U.S.
- Party: Republican
- Spouse: Catherine McKeown
- Children: 3
- Education: University of Wyoming (BS); Webster University (MBA)
- Profession: Self employed

Troy McKeown is an American politician and a Republican member of the Wyoming Senate, representing District 24 since January 4, 2021.

== Career ==
Troy McKeown graduated from the University of Wyoming in 1987. Before entering politics, McKeown served 27 years in the United States Army as an artillery officer and retired as a lieutenant colonel. He was also a business owner. He is a member of both the Senate Labor, Health & Social Services Committee and the Senate Transportation, Highways & Military Affairs Committee.

== Political viewpoints ==
Troy McKeown advocates for equal access to education for all from kindergarten to 12th grade.

== Elections ==
=== 2020 ===
Troy McKeown won the Republican Primary against former incumbent Michael Von Flatern, winning 63.4% of the vote.
