= Glenda F. Stark =

Wyoming politician

Member of the Wyoming House of Representatives from the 58th district
- In office 1993–1996
- Preceded by: Constituency established
- Succeeded by: Ann Robinson

Personal details
- Party: Republican

Glenda F. Stark is an American Republican politician from Casper, Wyoming. She represented the 58th district in the Wyoming House of Representatives from 1993 to 1996.
