= COVID-19 pandemic in Wyoming =

- Disease: COVID-19
- Pathogen: SARS-CoV-2
- Location: Wyoming, U.S.
- First outbreak: California, U.S.
- Index case: Sheridan County
- Arrival date: March 11, 2020
- Confirmed cases: 196,515 (through July 9, 2024)
- Deaths: 2,129 (through July 9, 2024)

Government website
- covid19.wyo.gov

The COVID-19 pandemic was confirmed to have reached the U.S. state of Wyoming in March 2020. On April 13, 2020, Wyoming became the last state in the U.S. to report its first death from COVID-19.

== Timeline ==
=== 2020 ===
==== March ====
- March 11: The first case of COVID-19 in Wyoming, a woman in Sheridan County who had recently travelled domestically, was reported.
- March 15: Governor Mark Gordon recommended closing all public schools. On March 24, Yellowstone National Park closed to visitors.

==== April ====
- April 17: The Democratic Party of Wyoming announced they would conduct their caucus through the mail.
- April 20: Approximately 100 protesters confronted Governor Gordon in Cheyenne, calling for the state to be reopened.

==== May ====
- May 4: Working groups announced to plan the reopening of the University of Wyoming campus.
- May 13: A new statewide order was issued, allowing K-12 schools to have in-person instruction.
- May 14: 688 new cases are confirmed with 7 deaths. The University of Wyoming announced the school was moving towards on-campus instruction for the fall semester. It requested $46 million of federal stimulus money to assist with the re-opening on campus.
- May 15: Restaurants and bars reopened with employees required to wear face coverings.
- May 18: Yellowstone National Park reopened to tourism. The East entrance in Wyoming opened while the West entrance in Montana remained closed. Cars lined up as early as 5:30 a.m. to enter the park. In addition, two more deaths were reported that day.
- May 19: Four nurses at the Wyoming Medical Center, the largest hospital in the state, tested positive for COVID-19. Although health officers warned of an increase in cases, there were no new state restrictions announced
- May 20: A child care center in Casper closed after one child tested positive for COVID-19.
- May 26: Wyoming health workers announced they were concerned to see there was a 42% drop in immunizations in the state throughout the month of April.
- May 27: A major rodeo, Cheyenne Frontier Days, was canceled for the first time since 1897.

==== June ====
- Throughout the month of June, the Alzheimer Association offered free webinars on COVID-19 and caregiving.
- June 8: 17 deaths have been reported.

==== July ====
- July 19: 25 deaths have been reported.
- July 22: 10 cases are confirmed at the Wyoming State Penitentiary in Rawlins after staff members conducted 876 tests of COVID-19.

==== August ====
- August 26: Nine people who tested positive reported attending the Sturgis Motorcycle Rally.

==== October ====
- October 26: By late October, with 3300 cases statewide, up from 500 in July, Wyoming had one of the highest infection rates per capita in the United States. An epidemiologist with the Wyoming Department of Health said "cases are growing far too quickly". Casper mayor Steve Freel said the city would not make wearing masks mandatory.

==== December ====
- Igor Shepherd, a state health official, resigns after the Casper Star-Tribune reveals that Shepherd referred to the "so-called pandemic" and said it was a Russian-Chinese plot to spread communism. Wyoming has reported 37,000 cases and 200 deaths, and a statewide mask mandate began on December 7.

=== 2021 ===
==== February ====
- February 25: All restrictions on personal care businesses, such as in nail salons, barber shops, massage parlors, and others imposed by public health orders will be lifted.

==== March ====
- March 8: A COVID-19 strain from South Africa, named the Beta variant, is found in Teton County, Wyoming. On the same day, Governor Gordon also announced that the state would be fully reopened on March 16, ending the mask mandate.

==== June ====
- As Wyoming was one of five U.S. states with less than 35% of its population vaccinated, Dr. Scott Gottlieb, former commissioner of the U.S. Food and Drug Administration, predicted the state was at risk for outbreaks of the Delta variant.

=== 2022 ===
==== January ====
- January 28: Covid-19 numbers skyrocketed. From 116.3 cases per 100,000 people to 1,664.6 per 100,000 people.

== Governor's Task Force and Wyoming Hunger Initiative ==
On March 17, 2020, Wyoming Governor Mark Gordon "announced the creation of five task forces designed to tackle the effects of the spreading coronavirus", and condemned hoarding in the state.

First Lady Jennie Gordon spearheaded the Wyoming Hunger Initiative to give much needed resources to nonprofits throughout the state. In May 2020 $40,000 was contributed to this fund to organizations such as the Wyoming Food Bank as well as to mobile food banks throughout the state.

== Impact on the Wyoming business community ==
Industries have had varying responses, with energy companies in the state trying to balance safety with continued productivity by imposing quarantine and travel restrictions. In 2020, the Wyoming Business Council hosted a series of webinars for business owners to help them transition to re-opening their businesses.

On May 27, 2020, it was reported that the state of Wyoming would lose $1.5 billion in revenue due to COVID-19. Since Wyoming is one of seven states with no income tax multiple proposals were shared to address this revenue shortage such as spending cuts.

== Impact on colleges ==
As a result of COVID-19, the University of Wyoming decided to offer their courses for the summer of 2020 online. In mid-May the university announced they were working towards re-opening the campus for the fall 2020 semester. Community colleges announced a variety of closures, including a move to distance learning at Casper College, Central Wyoming College and Northwest College.

Eastern Wyoming College was granted approval from Goshen County Public Health to re-open on May 18. Employees from this university worked 50% remotely and 50% on campus.

== Impact on Northern Arapaho tribe ==
It was announced on April 21, 2020, that four members of the Northern Arapaho tribe had died from COVID-19. All four had lived in Fremont County. Tribe Chairman Lee Spoonhunter was quoted as saying, "These tribal members were our family members who were dearly loved." Advocacy groups raised concerns COVID-19 could be having a disproportionate impact on Native American tribes as a result of higher rates of preexisting conditions such as diabetes. Some tribal members noted the crisis has also given community members the opportunity to share more oral stories. Similar to the national trend throughout the United States, people of color in the state of Wyoming were disproportionally impacted by COVID-19. As of May 18, 2020, 2.7 percent of COVID-19 cases were American Indian/Alaska Native. Six tribe members had died of COVID-19 as of May 20. Representative Andi Clifford, a citizen of the Northern Arapaho tribe, made an announcement about the 6th death on Facebook.

COVID-19 also had a major impact on the economy of the Northern Arapaho tribe as the casino on the Wind River Indian Reservation was converted into a location for quarantine run by Dr. Paul Ebbert.

== Impact on sports ==
In college sports, the National Collegiate Athletic Association cancelled all winter and spring tournaments, most notably the Division I men's and women's basketball tournaments, affecting colleges and universities statewide. On March 16, the National Junior College Athletic Association also canceled the remainder of the winter seasons as well as the spring seasons. High school sports were also cancelled. The 3A / 4A high school tournament played 2 games with no fans and then cancelled the tournament before most teams even played. Student athletes at the University of Wyoming were scheduled to return to the Laramie campus on June 1, 2020. A two-week quarantine was required.

== COVID-19 in Yellowstone ==
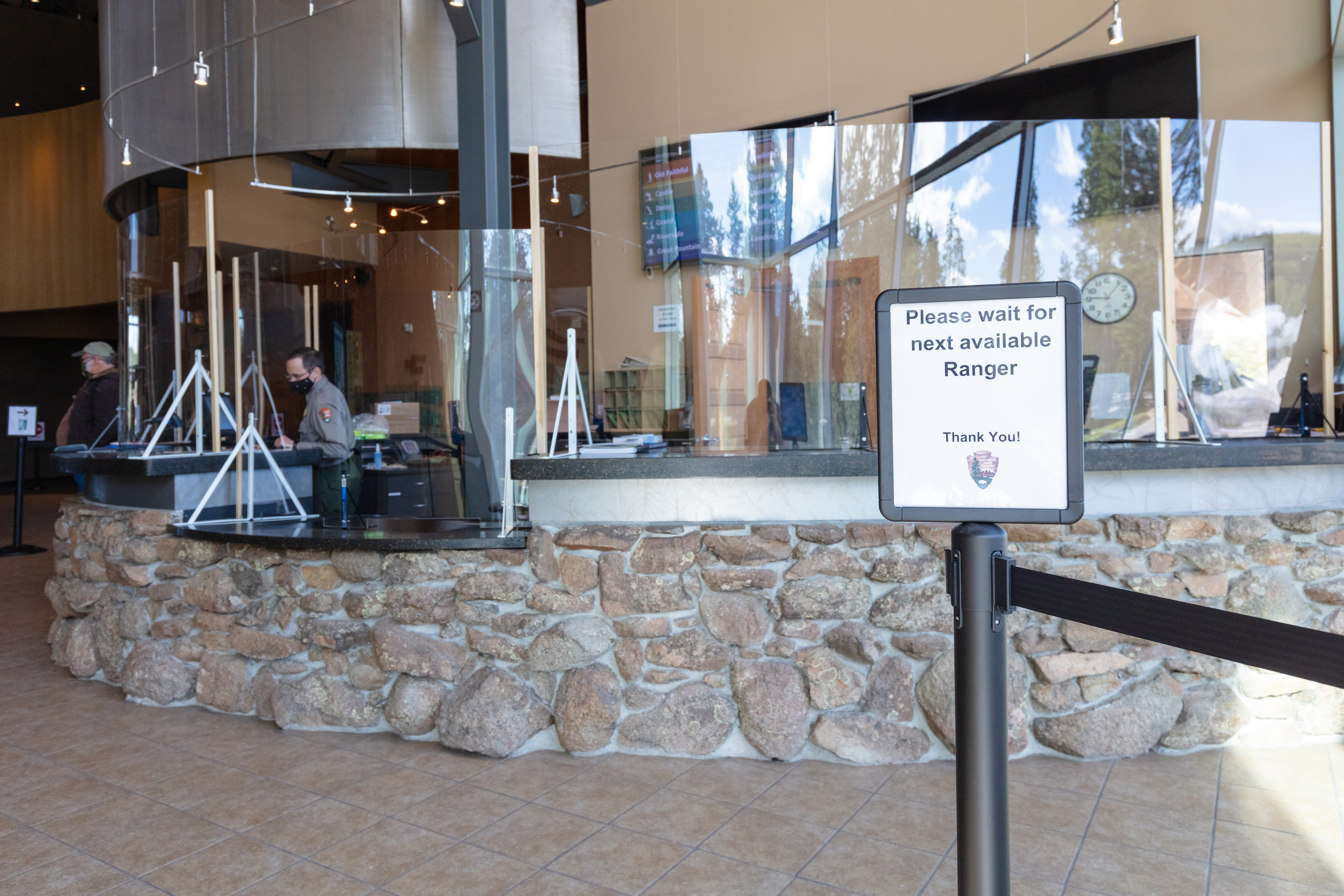
Plexiglass barriers at Old Faithful Visitor Education Center in Yellowstone protect visitors and staff from the spread of coronavirus, June 2020

The National Park Service has issued regular updates to closures in Yellowstone National Park based on CDC guidance. The Thermus aquaticus bacteria found in the thermal lakes in Yellowstone has been reported to be useful in testing for COVID-19. Controlling COVID-19 in Yellowstone has been logistically complicated as the national park spans three different states. Yellowstone reopened to the public with a long line of cars at the east entrance on May 18, 2020, after being closed for seven weeks. Within two hours of opening 200 cars entered the park. The Wyoming entrance opened first to control the flow of tourism into the park. The park did not allow lodging, food service or any tour buses, and many visitors did not wear masks.

== Protests ==
Throughout April and May 2020, there were several protests in Wyoming against the government's orders closing the state. One small protest took place in April in Casper.

== Statistics ==
COVID-19 pandemic medical cases in Wyoming by county
County (Note: County where individuals with a positive case reside. Location of diagnosis and treatment may vary.)	Confirmed Cases (Note: Reported confirmed and probable cases. Actual case numbers are probably higher.)	Probable Cases	Total Cases	Deaths	Vaccine (Note: Includes 121 nonresidents or persons from unknown counties.)	Population (Note: July 2019 population estimate from "U.S. Census Bureau Quick Facts: Wyoming". United States Census Bureau.)	Confirmed Cases / 100k	Total Cases / 100k
23 / 23	152,112	44,403	196,515	2,129	275,806	578,759	26,282.4	33,954.5
Albany	9,932	1,898	11,830	58	22,766	38,880	25,545.3	30,427.0
Big Horn	2,626	788	3,414	73	4,544	11,790	22,273.1	28,956.7
Campbell	13,718	1,284	15,002	173	13,963	46,341	29,602.3	32,373.1
Carbon	4,563	801	5,364	56	6,529	14,800	30,831.1	36,243.2
Converse	1,427	2,543	3,970	59	4,946	13,822	10,324.1	28,722.3
Crook	1,240	490	1,730	35	2,073	7,584	16,350.2	22,811.2
Fremont	14,926	2,870	17,796	216	20,970	39,261	38,017.4	45,327.4
Goshen	4,154	657	4,811	71	5,038	13,211	31,443.5	36,416.6
Hot Springs	1,031	622	1,653	23	2,334	4,413	23,362.8	37,457.5
Johnson	1,629	943	2,572	25	3,695	8,445	19,289.5	30,455.9
Laramie	24,364	9,730	34,094	346	48,737	99,500	24,486.4	34,265.3
Lincoln	4,014	1,035	5,049	39	8,390	19,830	20,242.1	25,461.4
Natrona	16,621	10,579	27,200	329	37,875	79,858	20,813.2	34,060.5
Niobrara	508	403	911	12	749	2,356	21,562.0	38,667.2
Park	7,159	1,237	8,396	157	13,521	29,194	24,522.2	28,759.3
Platte	1,712	771	2,483	48	3,508	8,393	20,398.0	29,584.2
Sheridan	7,966	2,705	10,671	99	15,397	30,485	26,130.9	35,004.1
Sublette	1,700	753	2,453	28	3,666	9,831	17,292.2	24,951.7
Sweetwater	11,798	1,297	13,095	145	19,293	42,343	27,862.9	30,926.0
Teton	11,916	582	12,498	16	21,907	23,464	50,784.2	53,264.6
Uinta	5,591	1,078	6,669	43	9,494	20,226	27,642.6	32,972.4
Washakie	1,907	897	2,804	51	3,563	7,805	24,433.1	35,925.7
Weston	1,610	440	2,050	27	2,727	6,927	23,242.4	29,594.3
Final update July 9, 2024; Vaccinations final update September 20, 2022; Data is publicly reported by Wyoming Department of Health

=== Hospitalizations ===
View source data.

Source: Wyoming Department of Health

== See also ==
- Timeline of the COVID-19 pandemic in the United States
- Yellowstone National Park
- COVID-19 pandemic in the United States – for impact on the country
- COVID-19 pandemic – for impact on other countries
