= Cale Case =

American politician

Member of the Wyoming Senate from the 25th district
- Incumbent
- Assumed office January 4, 1999
- Preceded by: John Vinich

Member of the Wyoming House of Representatives from the 54th district
- In office 1993 – January 4, 1999
- Preceded by: Constituency established
- Succeeded by: Del McOmie

Personal details
- Born: June 2, 1958 (age 68)
- Party: Republican
- Education: University of Wyoming
- Profession: Economist

Cale Case (born June 2, 1958) is an American economist, businessman, and politician from Wyoming. A Republican, Case has been a member of the Wyoming State Senate since 1999. From 1994 to 1998, he was a member of the Wyoming House of Representatives.

== Education and consulting career ==
Case holds a B.A. in economics and a Ph.D. in economics, both from the University of Wyoming at Laramie. He is a consultant.

== Political career ==
=== Tenure in the legislature ===
Case was a member of the Wyoming House of Representatives representing the 54th district from 1993 through 1998. He has been a member of the Wyoming Senate since 1999. Case has been a longtime chairman of the Senate Corporations, Elections, and Political Subdivisions Committee. In the state Senate, Case represents Fremont County District 25. The district includes an area along the Wind River Front, including Eastern Shoshone and Northern Arapaho constituencies.

Case is known for his contrarian and libertarian views. He endorsed Ron Paul in the 2008 Republican presidential primaries. In 2013, Case spoke in opposition to two nominees to the Wyoming Public Service Commission selected by Governor Matt Mead, and the two appointments were rejected by the Senate, a rare step. Case said that the nominees were unqualified and called for the governor to consider more economist nominees to the commission.

Case voted against legislation approved by the Wyoming Senate which would have forbidden the state from recognizing same-sex marriages legally made in other states or countries. Case said that Wyoming has been damaged in the eyes of the nation by the murder of Matthew Shepard, and said that he was "a religious man" but he believed that "there has to be a separation between the laws of this state and what religious people believe." Case supported 2021 legislation to abolish capital punishment in Wyoming (Wyoming last executed an inmate in 1992).

Although usually a strong opponent of tax increases, Case supported a 2019 bill that would have created a corporate income tax targeted mostly at big-box stores. (The legislation did not pass). Case has also been a longtime leading proponent of higher taxes on wind energy.

In 2012, Case supported a resolution urging Congress to grant federal funding to remediate uranium contamination at the Riverton Uranium Mill Tailings, an abandoned uranium mill at the Wind River Indian Reservation. Case noted that the tribes lacked the resources to clean up the site without federal aid. In 2019, Case supported legislation to end net metering in Wyoming, which allowed small-scale solar power users to sell their surplus electricity to the utility company, saving money. Case described net metering as a "subsidy" that put a strain on the utility and on customers who did not use solar power.

In 2019, as co-chairman of the Joint Revenue Committee, Case supported legislation for Wyoming to accept the Medicaid expansion, extending health insurance coverage to an estimated 19,000 Wyomingites saying: "I'd like to hang tough, I suppose, and say people ought to find their own insurance that the health care markets work, but I think the health care markets are really screwed up, I really do. And I think without insurance you are at a real disadvantage to get care, especially if you have a chronic disease." In 2021, Case supported a bill to create tolls for Interstate 80 in Wyoming, one of the state's largest highways; the bill narrowly passed the Senate.

In 2021, during the COVID-19 pandemic in Wyoming, Case opposed the federal mandates requiring certain employers with more than 100 employees to require employees to be vaccinated against COVID-19 or be tested regularly. However, Case opposed the calling of a special session of the state legislature to pass anti-vaccine mandate legislation. During the session, Case opposed legislation that would ban insurance companies and private businesses from denying services to customers who are not vaccinated against COVID-19, citing the rights of private enterprise.

=== Unsuccessful bids for U.S. House and U.S. Senate ===
Case unsuccessfully launched a campaign for Congress in the 2004 election, challenging U.S. Representative Barbara Cubin (elected from Wyoming's at-large congressional district) in the Republican primary. Case criticized Cubin over missed votes and contended that she was too aligned with "pork-barrel politics." In the August 2004 Republican primary, Case came in third place: Cubin took 54%, Cheyenne attorney Bruce Asay 26%, and Case 15%.

In 2007, Case was one of 31 candidates to fill the U.S. Senate vacancy created by the death of Craig L. Thomas; the Wyoming Republican Party Central Committee did not select Case as a finalist, choosing John Barrasso, Cynthia Lummis, and Tom Sansonetti instead.

== Personal life ==
Case lives in Lander in Fremont County.
