= Pat Sweeney =

American politician

Member of the Wyoming House of Representatives from the 58th district
- In office January 10, 2017 – January 2023
- Preceded by: Tom Reeder
- Succeeded by: Bill Allemand

Personal details
- Born: June 16, 1954 (age 72) Jamestown, New York, U.S.
- Party: Republican
- Education: Pennsylvania State University
- Profession: Businessman

Patrick Sweeney (born June 16, 1954) is an American politician who serve as a Republican member of the Wyoming House of Representatives representing District 58 from January 10, 2017 to January 2023.

== Elections ==
=== 2016 ===
Sweeney and Charles Schoenwolf challenged incumbent Representative Tom Reeder in the Republican primary. Sweeney defeated Reeder by 13 votes, winning 44% of the vote. He defeated Democrat Michael McDaniel Jr. and independent candidate Joe Porambo in the general election with 77% of the vote.

=== 2022 ===
Sweeney was defeated in the Republican primary in his attempt at re-election.
