= Randall Luthi =

American politician

Randall B. Luthi
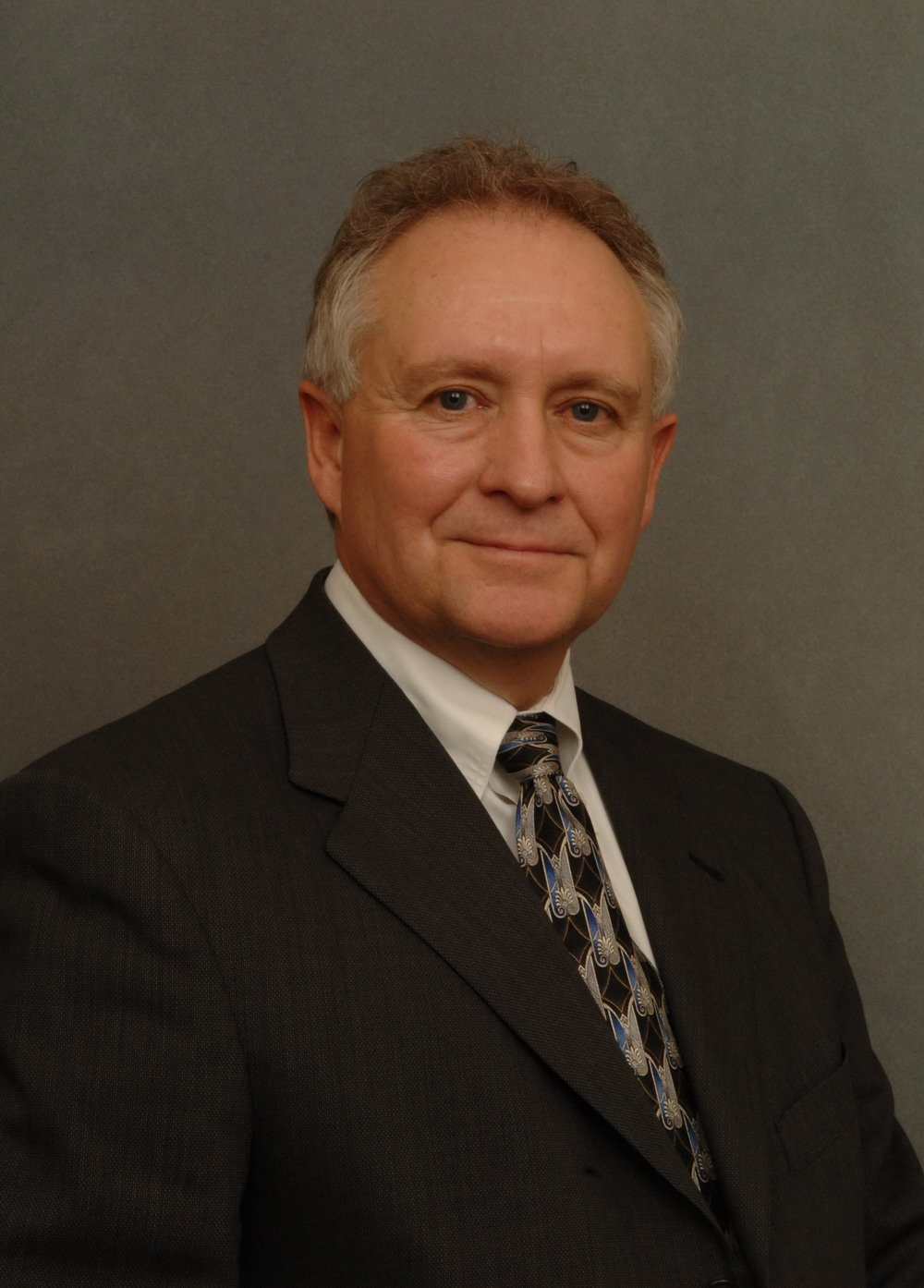
- Randall Luthi in official U.S. government portrait

Member of the Wyoming House of Representatives from the 21st district
- In office 1995–2007
- Preceded by: Clyde Wolfley
- Succeeded by: Dan Dockstader

58th Speaker of the Wyoming House of Representatives
- In office January 1, 2005 – December 31, 2006
- Preceded by: Fred Parady
- Succeeded by: Roy Cohee

Director of the Minerals Management Service
- In office July 23, 2007 – January 2009
- Preceded by: Johnnie Burton
- Succeeded by: Walter Cruickshank

Personal details
- Born: 1955 (age 70–71)
- Party: Republican
- Occupation: Attorney; Rancher; Lobbyist

Randall B. Luthi (born 1955) is an attorney and rancher from Freedom, who served as a Republican in the Wyoming House of Representatives from 1995 to 2007. He was the Speaker for his last two-year term, 2005 to 2007. Prior to 2005, he had been the House Majority Leader. Previously, he had been an intern in the Congressional office of Wyoming Congressman Dick Cheney.

From 2007 to 2009, he was the director of the Department of Interior's Minerals Management Service.

On March 1, 2010, Luthi became president of the National Ocean Industries Association (NOIA), a Washington, D.C.–based political action committee representing "the companies that develop the nation’s valuable offshore energy resources.". As NOIA president, Luthi wrote to the acting director of the Minerals Management Service on June 7, 2010, advocating rapid clarification of offshore drilling rules because "it is not a time for a lengthy and undefined ban or suspension on all drilling."

In June 2007, upon the death of U.S. Senator Craig Thomas, Luthi was among thirty applicants for appointment to fill the vacancy until a special election is held on November 4, 2008. Luthi was not chosen by the Republican State Central Committee as one of the three finalists to be considered for appointment by the state's governor, Democrat Dave Freudenthal. Luthi tied for fifth place on the second ballot and lost a tie-breaking vote.

| Preceded by Fred Parady | Speaker of the Wyoming House of Representatives; 2005—2006 | Succeeded by Roy Cohee |
