= Tyler Lindholm =

American politician and former Wyoming state legislator (born 1983)

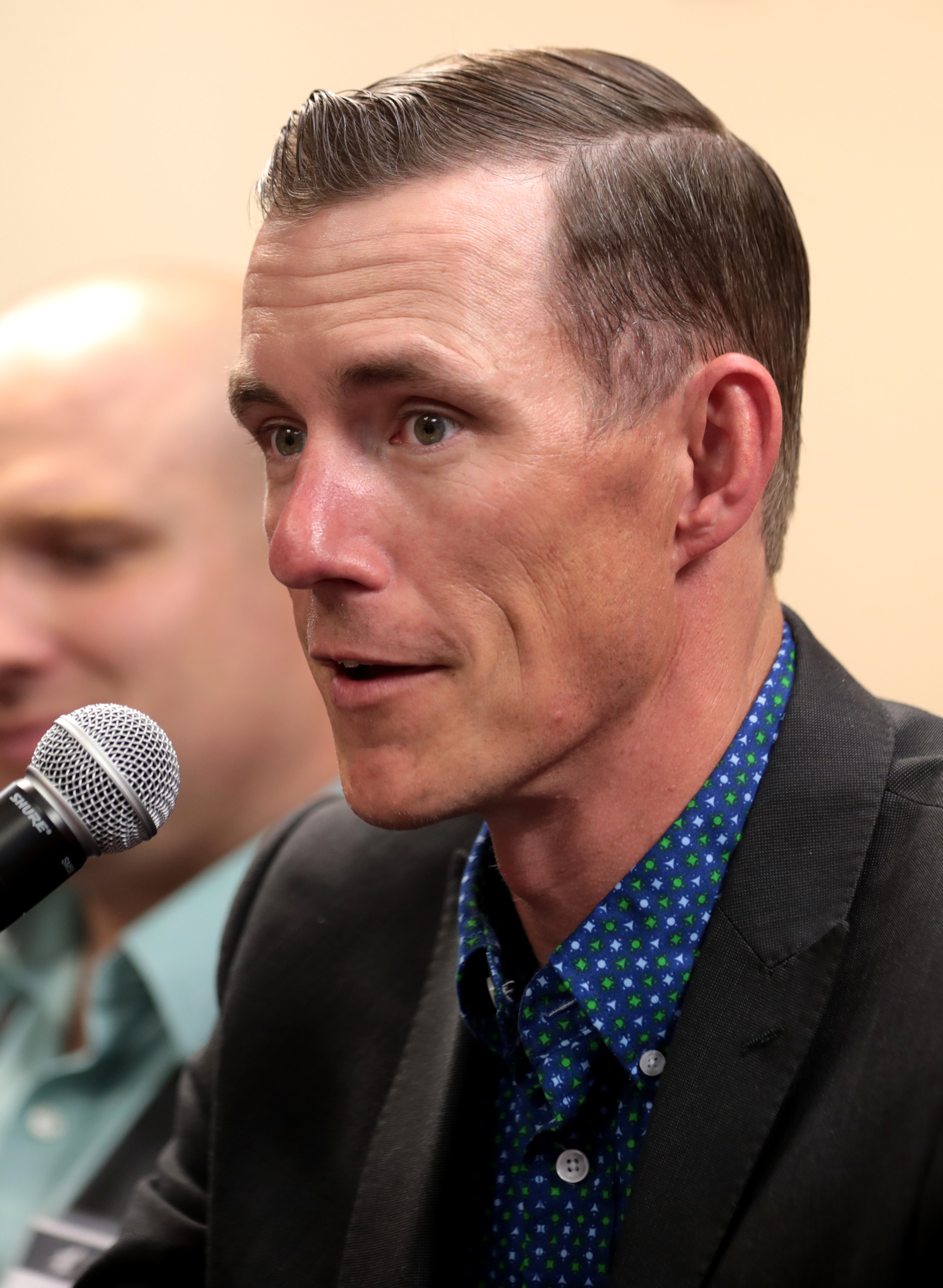

Member of the Wyoming House of Representatives from the 1st district
- In office January 5, 2015 – January 4, 2021
- Preceded by: Mark Semlek
- Succeeded by: Chip Neiman

Personal details
- Born: May 18, 1983 (age 43)
- Party: Republican
- Spouse: Charity Lindholm
- Children: 4
- Profession: Rancher

Tyler Lindholm (born May 18, 1983) is an American politician and former state legislator for Wyoming. A member of the Republican Party, Lindholm represented the 1st district in the Wyoming House of Representatives from 2015 to 2020.

Lindholm helped craft legislation in Wyoming designed to attract cryptocurrency start-ups and diversify the economy. A company he helped start was BeefChain, a tracking system for cattle and beef which used the Cardano blockchain. Members included Rob Jennings, the former WPVI-TV anchor and a co-founder of the Wyoming Blockchain Coalition (which has since been disbanded); Avanti Financial Group and Custodia Bank founder Caitlin Long (who would later challenge the U.S. Fed over its policy); and Wyoming state senator Ogden Driskill.

Following his 2021 election defeat, Lindholm became state policy director for Senator Cynthia Lummis. In 2023, he left Lummis’ office to open a Wyoming chapter of Americans for Prosperity, a libertarian conservative political advocacy group.

== Elections ==
In 2014, Lindholm announced his candidacy for the 1st district of the Wyoming House of Representatives after incumbent Republican representative Mark Semlek announced his retirement. He defeated Bruce Brown and Ted Davis in the Republican primary with 43% of the vote. Lindholm was subsequently elected unopposed in the general election.

Lindholm defeated challenger Ted Davis in the Republican primary on August 16, 2016. He went on to win the general election against Democrat Randy Leinen.

In 2018, Lindholm ran unopposed in both the Republican primary and the general election.

Lindholm was defeated in the 2020 Republican primary by Chip Neiman who went on to win the general election and took office the following January.
