= Evan Simpson =

American politician

Member of the Wyoming House of Representatives from the 21st district
- In office October 13, 2017 – January 10, 2023
- Preceded by: Robert McKim
- Succeeded by: Lane Allred

Personal details
- Born: February 11, 1957 (age 69) Afton, Wyoming, U.S.
- Party: Republican
- Spouse: Bev Simpson
- Children: 6
- Profession: Consulting civil engineer

Evan Simpson (born February 11, 1957) is an American politician and a Republican former member of the Wyoming House of Representatives representing District 21 from his appointment on October 13, 2017 until January 10, 2023.

== Elections ==
=== 2017 ===
Incumbent Republican Representative Robert McKim resigned on September 14, 2017, for health reasons. Lincoln County Commissioners appointed Simpson to replace McKim and took office on October 13, 2017.

== Personal life ==
Simpson is a member of the Church of Jesus Christ of Latter-day Saints.
