= Lloyd Larsen =

American politician

Member of the Wyoming House of Representatives from the 54th district
- Incumbent
- Assumed office January 8, 2013
- Preceded by: Del McOmie

Personal details
- Born: Lloyd Charles Larsen Monticello, Utah, U.S.
- Party: Republican

Lloyd Charles Larsen (born in Monticello, Utah) is an American politician and a Republican member of the Wyoming House of Representatives representing District 54 since January 8, 2013.

== Elections ==
- 2012 When Republican Representative Del McOmie retired and left the District 54 seat open, Larsen won the three-way August 21, 2012 Republican Primary with 978 votes (51.5%), and won the three-way November 6, 2012 General election with 2,787 votes (55.3%) against Democratic nominee Bruce Palmer and Libertarian candidate Ryan Jones, who had sought the seat in 2010 as a Republican.
