= Michael Von Flatern =

American politician

Vice President of the Wyoming Senate
- In office 2017–2019
- Preceded by: Drew Perkins
- Succeeded by: Ogden Driskill

Member of the Wyoming Senate from the 24th district
- In office January 3, 2005 – 2021
- Preceded by: Dick Erb
- Succeeded by: Troy McKeown

Personal details
- Born: October 19, 1954 (age 71) New London, Connecticut, U.S.
- Party: Republican
- Occupation: Pilot

Michael Von Flatern (born October 19, 1954) is an American politician. He was a Republican member of the Wyoming Senate, representing the 24th district from 2005 to 2021. The 24th district represents Campbell County, Wyoming.

== Education ==
Von Flatern received his diploma from Saint Bernard's High School, 1972

== Political experience ==
His political experience is Senator, Wyoming State Senate, 2005–2021.

== Legislative Committees ==
Michael Von Flatern has been a member of the following committees:

- Air Transportation Liaison Committee, Member
- Appropriations, Member
- Medicaid Cost Study - Oversight Legislative Advisory Committee, Chair
- Select Committee on Legislative Facilities, Member

== Caucuses/Non-Legislative Committees ==
Michael Von Flatern has been a member of the following committees:

- Member, Community College Planning Task Force
- Chair, Drug Court Steering Committee
- Member, Energy Council
- Member, State Office Building Exterior Design Oversight Committee
- Member, Workforce Development Council

== Professional Experience ==
Michael Von Flatern has had the following professional experience:

- Owner/President, Von's Welding, Incorporated, 1979–1997
- Owner/President, Innovative Mining and Equipment, Limited Liability Company
- Pilot
