= Drew Perkins =

American politician (born 1956)

President of the Wyoming Senate
- In office January 8, 2019 – January 12, 2021
- Preceded by: Eli Bebout
- Succeeded by: Dan Dockstader

Majority Leader of the Wyoming Senate
- In office 2017–2019
- Preceded by: Phil Nicholas
- Succeeded by: Dan Dockstader

Member of the Wyoming Senate from the 29th district
- In office January 3, 2007 – November 10, 2022
- Preceded by: Bill Hawks
- Succeeded by: Bob Ide

Member of the Natrona County Commission
- In office September 29, 2003 – 2006
- Preceded by: Mike Haigler

Personal details
- Born: March 21, 1956 (age 70) Boise, Idaho, U.S.
- Party: Republican
- Spouse: Kristie Marie Dittburner
- Children: 2
- Education: Brigham Young University (BS); Southeastern University (MS); University of Wyoming (JD)

Drew A. Perkins (born March 21, 1956) is an American politician who served in the Wyoming Senate from the 29th district as a member of the Republican Party. He served as President of the Senate from 2019 to 2021.

Perkins was born in Boise, Idaho, and educated at Brigham Young University, Southeastern University, and the University of Wyoming. He entered politics in the 2000s with unsuccessful campaigns for a seat on the Natrona County Commission, but was appointed to the commission in 2003. He served on the commission until his election to the Wyoming Senate. In the state senate he rose from Vice President to Majority Leader and then to President of the Senate.

== Early life ==
Drew A. Perkins was born on March 21, 1956, in Boise, Idaho. He graduated from Kelly Walsh High School. From 1977 to 1980, he attended Brigham Young University and graduated with a Bachelor of Science in accounting. From 1981 to 1983, he attended Southeastern University and graduated with a Master of Science in taxation. From 1989 to 1992, he attended the University of Wyoming and graduated with a Juris Doctor. During his time at the University of Wyoming he was on the Dean's List.

On August 5, 1986, he married Kristie Marie Dittburner inside the Salt Lake Temple in Salt Lake City, Utah. He would later have two children with her.

== Career ==
=== Local politics ===
In 2000, Ron Ketchum died leaving a vacancy on the Natrona County Commission. Perkins was one of the possible candidates to be nominated by the Natrona County Republican Party, but Ed Opella, Art Volk, and Dick Lindsey were the three selected. Lindsey was later selected by the Natron County Commission to fill the vacancy on June 16.

In 2002, Perkins ran in the Republican primary for the nomination for a seat on the three-member Natrona County Commission, but placed fifth in the primary.

On August 29, 2003, Mike Haigler left the Natrona County Commission to become the Natrona County Road and Bridge Department supervisor. The Natrona County Republican Party selected Perkins, Tom Zimmerman, and Doug Cooper as possible nominees on September 16, and the Natrona County Commission selected Perkins on September 24. On September 29, Perkins was inaugurated as a member of the commission. In 2004, he ran in the Republican primary, where he placed first, and defeated the Democratic nominee Dick Sadler in a separate county commissioner special election for a two-year term.

=== Wyoming Senate ===
==== Elections ====
In 2006, Perkins ran with the Republican nomination for a seat in the Wyoming Senate from the 29th district and defeated former Cheyenne mayor and state representative Larry R. Clapp in the general election. During the campaign he was endorsed by incumbent Senator Bill Hawks. In May 2010, Perkins filed to run for reelection and won without opposition in the general election.

In 2014, Perkins stated that he would not run in the Secretary of State election. He ran for reelection, defeated Bob Ide in the Republican primary after spending $12,270.15, and won reelection without opposition in the general election. In 2018, Perkins faced no opposition in the primary or general elections. He was defeated in his attempt at re-election in the 2022 Republican primary.

==== Tenure ====
In 2010, Perkins endorsed Cindy Hill for Wyoming Superintendent of Public Instruction.

From 2011 to 2012, he served as chairman of the Judiciary committee and the Select Committee on Capital Finance and Investments.

On November 15, 2014, Perkins was selected by the Republican caucus to serve as Vice President of the Senate. He served as Vice President of the Senate from 2015 to 2017. On November 19, 2016, the Republican caucus selected Perkins to serve as the Senate Majority Leader and replaced him with Michael Von Flatern as Vice President of the Senate. He served as Majority Leader of the Senate from 2017 to 2019. On November 16, 2018, Perkins was selected by the Republican caucus to serve as President of the Senate and took office on January 8, 2019.

After losing the 2022 primary for re-election, Perkins resigned from the Senate on November 10 to become Governor Mark Gordon's chief of staff.

== Political positions ==
In 2016, the Wyoming Senate voted down a $268 million Medicaid expansion, with Perkins against.

=== Crime ===
In 2009, Perkins introduced legislation, which was approved by the Wyoming Senate, that would require ignition interlock devices in the cars of drivers who had been convicted for drunk driving twice or with a blood alcohol content of .15%. He opposed prohibiting cell phone usage while driving, not wanting to give criminal records to young people whose behavior he thought would not change.

In 2012, Perkins was named as legislator of the year by the Wyoming Association of Sheriff and Chiefs of Police.

== Electoral history ==
Drew Perkins electoral history

2006 Wyoming Senate 29th district election
Primary election
Party	Candidate	Votes	%
Republican	Drew Perkins	1,983	100.00%
Total votes		1,983	100.00%
General election
Republican	Drew Perkins	3,335	51.06%
Democratic	Larry D. Clapp	3,196	48.94%
Total votes		6,531	100.00%

2010 Wyoming Senate 29th district election
Primary election
Party	Candidate	Votes	%
Republican	Drew Perkins (incumbent)	2,586	99.27%
Write-in		19	0.73%
Total votes		2,605	100.00%
Undervote	Invalid votes	497	
General election
Republican	Drew Perkins (incumbent)	4,685	98.53%
Write-in		70	1.47%
Total votes		4,755	100.00%
Overvote	Invalid votes	1	
Undervote	Invalid votes	1,186	

2014 Wyoming Senate 29th district election
Primary election
Party	Candidate	Votes	%
Republican	Drew Perkins (incumbent)	1,480	50.56%
Republican	Bob Ide	1,441	49.23%
Write-in		6	0.20%
Total votes		2,927	100.00%
Undervote	Invalid votes	132	
General election
Republican	Drew Perkins (incumbent)	4,613	97.65%
Write-in		111	2.35%
Total votes		4,724	100.00%
Undervote	Invalid votes	1,190	

2018 Wyoming Senate 29th district election
Primary election
Party	Candidate	Votes	%
Republican	Drew Perkins (incumbent)	3,169	98.51%
Write-in		48	1.49%
Total votes		3,217	100.00%
Overvote	Invalid votes	1	
Undervote	Invalid votes	876	
General election
Republican	Drew Perkins (incumbent)	5,282	97.62%
Write-in		129	2.38%
Total votes		5,411	100.00%
Undervote	Invalid votes	1,276	

Wyoming Senate
Preceded by Phil Nicholas	Majority Leader of the Wyoming Senate; 2017–2019	Succeeded by Dan Dockstader
Political offices
Preceded by Eli Bebout	President of the Wyoming Senate; 2019–2021	Succeeded by Dan Dockstader
