= Bill Allemand =

American politician and rancher

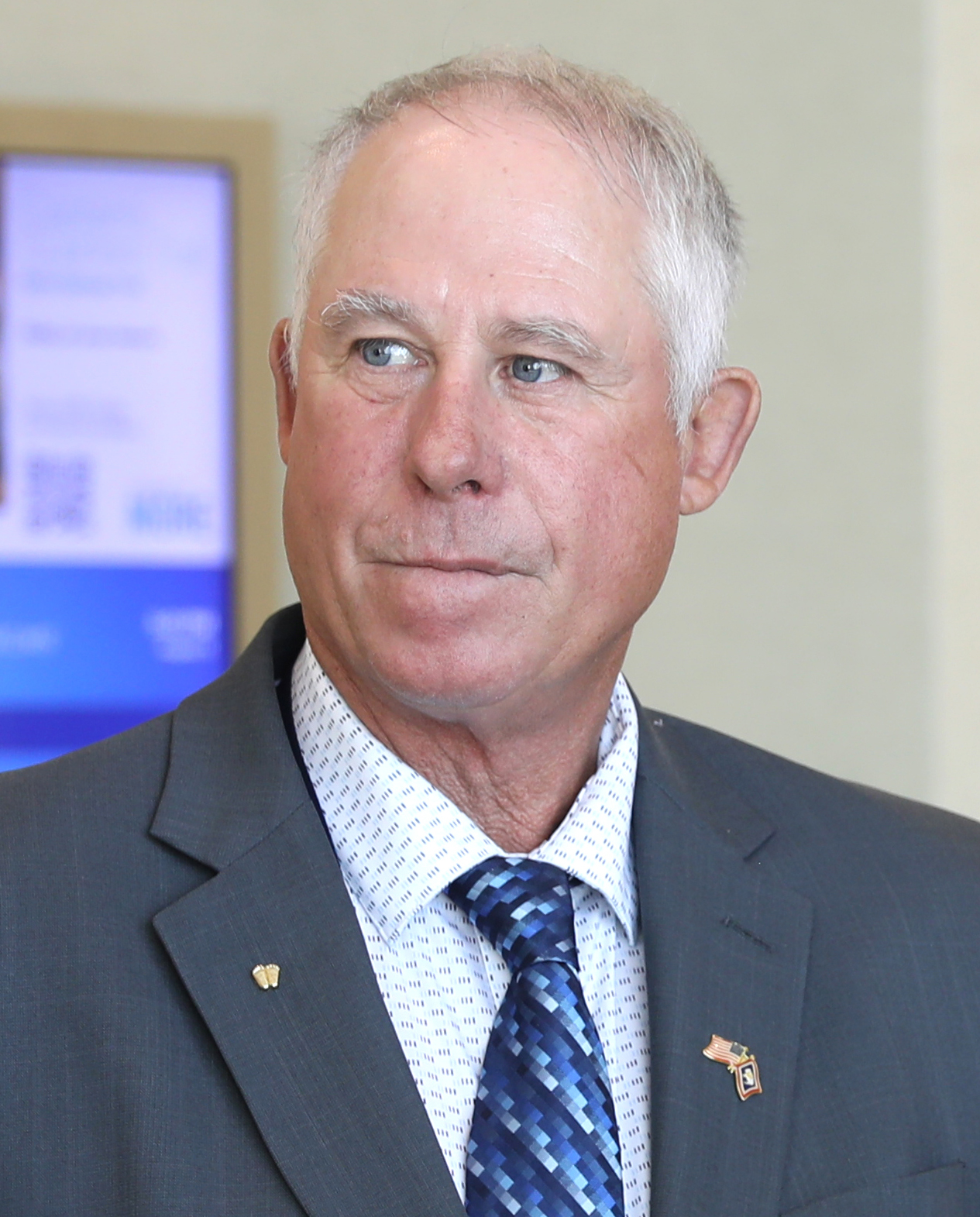

Member of the Wyoming House of Representatives from the 58th district
- Incumbent
- Assumed office January 2, 2023
- Preceded by: Pat Sweeney

Personal details
- Born: 1959 (age 66–67) Casper, Wyoming, U.S.
- Party: Republican
- Occupation: Rancher, business owner

Bill Allemand (born 1959) is an American rancher, trucking-company owner and Republican politician who has represented the 58th district in the Wyoming House of Representatives since January 2023. A member of the Wyoming Freedom Caucus, he has served on the House Appropriations Committee. His legislative work has included bills concerning shooting predatory animals from vehicles, foreign ownership of land, and federal land management. In 2025, he became a leading opponent of a proposed nuclear-microreactor manufacturing plant near Bar Nunn, Wyoming. The developer subsequently selected Tennessee for the project, a decision Governor Mark Gordon attributed in part to opposition and fearmongering by the Freedom Caucus.

Allemand was arrested on suspicion of driving under the influence in December 2025 and spent two days in jail following the arrest. A state test later reported a blood-alcohol concentration of 0.24 percent, three times Wyoming's general legal limit of 0.08 percent. In July 2026, he pleaded guilty to driving under the influence, received a suspended jail sentence and was placed on unsupervised probation. Court reporting about the case also disclosed earlier Kansas proceedings involving a dismissed domestic-battery charge and a no-contest plea to violating a protection order.

== Early life and career ==
Allemand was born in Casper, Wyoming, in 1959. He grew up on his family's ranch near Naval Petroleum Reserve No. 3 in northeastern Natrona County, outside Midwest and Edgerton. He graduated from Midwest High School in 1977 and attended Colby Community College in Colby, Kansas, from 1980 to 1982.

Allemand later lived in Kansas before returning to Wyoming. He owns and operates a small trucking company that transports water for oil and gas operations in the Salt Creek Oil Field around Midwest and Edgerton. He has four children and six grandchildren.

== Political career ==
=== Elections ===
Allemand ran for Wyoming House District 58 in 2022. He defeated Patrick Sweeney in the Republican primary with 1,369 votes, or approximately 62.8 percent, and was unopposed in the general election apart from write-in votes. He took office in January 2023.

In 2024, Allemand defeated Republican primary challenger Tom Jones with 1,017 votes, or approximately 70.3 percent, and again faced no listed general-election opponent. Allemand therefore ran unopposed in both the 2022 and 2024 general elections, facing only write-in votes after winning each Republican primary.

Allemand sought a third term in 2026 and narrowly defeated Bar Nunn mayor Peter Boyer in the Republican primary. Unofficial county results gave Allemand 800 votes, or approximately 50.3 percent, and Boyer 773 votes, or approximately 48.6 percent.

Campaign Contributions:

Allemand $3,000 Carleen and Daniel Brophy $3,000 Peri Wheeler $1,500 Shannon Wheeler $1,500 Bill Owens $1,000 Curtis E Meier $1,000 John Allemand $1,000 Mary Owens $1,000 Niki Allemand $1,000 Robert Deitz $1,000

Of note is Carleen and Daniel Brophy, Daniel being a former commodities trader in Chicago. It is noted that "Brophy was Wyoming’s biggest single donor in the primary elections in August. He was a one-man version of a political action committee in a state where even donations under the $1,500 cap for primary contributions can go a long way. Almost all donations by Daniel Brophy are matched by his wife Carleen. That means most beneficiaries of his wealth receive up to $3,000 for their primary elections, which in many cases becomes the bulk of their spending money. As one candidate put it, that’s a mailing to every registered voter in his district.

=== Wyoming Freedom Caucus ===
Allemand is identified by the Wyoming Freedom Caucus as one of its members. The caucus is affiliated with the State Freedom Caucus Network, which WyoFile described as a national right-wing political organization seeking to establish hard-line majorities in state legislatures. Modeled on the congressional House Freedom Caucus, the network supplies affiliated caucuses with staff, legislative research, communications assistance and political strategy.

During Allemand's tenure, Jessie Rubino served as the salaried Wyoming state director of the State Freedom Caucus Network. WyoFile reported that Rubino researched legislation and transmitted the caucus's voting recommendations to members and allied legislators by text message, sometimes while votes were underway. Then-chairman John Bear confirmed that the messages summarized Rubino's and the caucus's preferences, and the caucus frequently voted as a unified bloc.

After release of the body-camera footage from Allemand's DUI arrest, he said that Freedom Caucus leaders had discussed the case with him and indicated that the organization continued to support him. The caucus continued to list Allemand as a member after his guilty plea and after reporting disclosed his Kansas criminal proceedings.

== Legislative activity ==
=== Shooting predatory animals from vehicles ===
In 2025, Allemand sponsored House Bill 211, which permitted a person on private property to shoot prairie dogs, predators and specified agricultural pests from a stationary motor vehicle. The measure did not authorize shooting from or across a public road. Allemand said ranchers had long used vehicles as shooting platforms and argued that the previous restriction unnecessarily exposed them to criminal penalties.

The bill drew questions about firearm safety and whether officers and members of the public could readily distinguish lawful shooting on private property from prohibited shooting from a public road. Public reporting on the measure did not identify a statewide count of prosecutions under the former law or a specific case in which a rancher had been unfairly prosecuted. The Legislature nevertheless passed the bill, making it Allemand's first successful individually sponsored measure.

=== Foreign ownership of land ===
In 2023, Allemand sponsored House Bill 116, which would have prohibited governments, companies and citizens associated with China, Russia and countries designated by the federal government as state sponsors of terrorism from acquiring more than one acre of Wyoming land. Covered owners would have been required to divest within two years. The measure also created enforcement and civil liability provisions.

During debate, Allemand connected the proposal to the Chinese surveillance balloon that crossed the United States in early 2023. He argued that foreign ownership near military installations, infrastructure and mineral resources presented a security concern. Critics questioned whether the bill's definitions were sufficiently precise and warned that it could affect lawful residents and commercial transactions without a demonstrated connection to espionage.

Opponents compared the proposal with Wyoming's former alien land laws, which were enacted to prevent Japanese immigrants from owning property and settling in the state. Representative Mike Yin referred to the internment of Japanese Americans at the Heart Mountain Relocation Center during World War II and Wyoming's subsequent efforts to prevent them from remaining in the state. "I don't want us to repeat history," Yin said. Other legislators warned that the bill discriminated according to national origin, conflicted with a provision of the Wyoming Constitution guaranteeing resident aliens the same rights as citizens in the possession and enjoyment of property, and could force existing owners to sell under financial duress. Representative Clark Stith said buyers would know that affected owners had to divest within two years and could acquire the property at a significant discount. The House rejected the bill by a vote of 39 to 23.

=== Rock Springs land-management dispute ===
In 2023, Allemand opposed a draft resource management plan prepared by the Bureau of Land Management's Rock Springs field office for approximately 3.6 million acres of federal land in southwestern Wyoming. The agency's preferred alternative proposed additional conservation protections for portions of the Red Desert, including designation of approximately 1.6 million acres as areas of critical environmental concern. It would have closed substantial acreage to new oil and gas leasing, hard-rock mining claims and renewable-energy development while leaving 99.8 percent of the planning area available for livestock grazing and about 1.4 million acres open to oil and gas development.

For public recreation, the preferred alternative would have prohibited off-road vehicle use on 225,537 acres while retaining designated motorized routes on approximately 3.37 million acres. It did not propose closing the entire planning area to recreation or public access. Supporters said the proposal better balanced development with wildlife habitat, tribal cultural resources and long-term protection of public lands. Jason Baldes, an Eastern Shoshone tribal member and vice president of the InterTribal Buffalo Council, said the plan would help protect traditional homelands from exploitation. Energy companies, ranching interests and several Wyoming elected officials opposed the preferred alternative, arguing that its restrictions would harm existing industries and depart from the Bureau of Land Management's multiple-use mandate.

Allemand called the proposal "probably the biggest disaster in the United States, affecting more people than the Civil War, Pearl Harbor or the September 11 attacks combined" and urged residents to stop what he called a "state-killing" plan. High Country News characterized his comparison as hyperbolic. The publication reported that the broader campaign against the plan included incendiary rhetoric, misinformation and threats directed at federal land managers. It also noted that claims that the plan would eliminate access and use across the area omitted the extensive grazing, mineral development and recreation that the preferred alternative would continue to allow.

== Radiant nuclear project controversy ==
=== Proposed Bar Nunn facility ===
In 2025, California-based Radiant Nuclear proposed building a manufacturing campus outside Bar Nunn for its portable, one-megawatt Kaleidos nuclear microreactors. The company intended to manufacture and fuel reactors in Wyoming and ship them to customers, including the United States military and users in remote locations. The reactors were designed to operate for years without refueling and then return to the factory for servicing.

Radiant subsequently entered an agreement with the Defense Innovation Unit and the United States Air Force to deliver a Kaleidos reactor to a military installation. The federal Advanced Nuclear Power for Installations program was established to provide military bases with independent, continuous power, including during disruptions to the civilian electric grid. Reuters described the Department of Defense as accelerating microreactor development to obtain off-grid, 24-hour power for bases and military operations.

Radiant planned to remove the used fuel at the factory and store it in dry casks until the federal government established a permanent repository. The company described the spent fuel from each unit as having a volume roughly equal to two propane cylinders. The proposed site was more than one mile from the nearest home and, according to the company, satisfied Nuclear Regulatory Commission distance requirements. The Nuclear Regulatory Commission states that properly designed dry-cask systems provide sealed containment, radiation shielding and passive cooling and are considered a safe method of storing spent nuclear fuel. Opponents emphasized that the United States still lacks a permanent repository and argued that nominally temporary storage could therefore continue indefinitely.

Radiant projected that the facility could create up to 10 construction jobs in 2026, 75 jobs by 2028 and 250 jobs by 2035. The company proposed investing more than $150 million, while Natrona County supported an application for a $25 million state infrastructure grant for water, sewer and related improvements. Bar Nunn had approximately 3,000 residents and about 1,070 households. Its 2024 median household income was approximately $98,800. The company's long-term forecast was equivalent to more than eight jobs for every 100 town residents, although employees could have commuted from the wider Casper and Natrona County labor market.

=== Allemand's opposition ===
Allemand supported the manufacturing component but opposed changing Wyoming law to allow Radiant to keep spent fuel at the facility. At a July 2025 town hall attended by about 200 people, he said, "Bar Nunn does not want nuclear waste. We want manufacturing. We would love for Radiant to come here and manufacture and put the waste somewhere else."

Allemand said polling he conducted showed that approximately 70 percent of respondents opposed storage near Bar Nunn. WyoFile reported the claimed result but did not identify the poll's sample size, response rate, question wording, sampling method or margin of error. The audience's applause at the town hall was described as lending support to his account, but no independently conducted public-opinion survey was reported.

Allemand called the spent fuel the "deadliest of deadly" and disputed Radiant's economic projections. He estimated that the operation would employ closer to 100 people, compared with the company's forecast of 250 jobs by 2035. Allemand also argued that Radiant's projected average compensation of approximately $70,000 would not attract experienced Wyoming welders and pipefitters, whom he asserted would require approximately $120,000. His comparison placed the company's projected average compensation across its workforce against his estimate for particular skilled trades rather than disclosed wages for the proposed welding and pipefitting positions. After Radiant selected Tennessee, that state announced 175 positions and described them as "high-quality jobs", although it did not publish position-specific wages.

=== Dispute with Peter Boyer ===
The project divided Allemand from Peter Boyer, the mayor of Bar Nunn and a former political ally. Boyer moved his family to Bar Nunn in 2016, was appointed to the town council in 2018, served as a council member through 2022 and was subsequently elected mayor. An Iraq War veteran who served two tours and worked transporting crude oil, Boyer supported continuing negotiations with Radiant and later challenged Allemand in the 2026 Republican primary. Boyer argued that the town should evaluate the proposal on its merits rather than reject it before regulatory and economic details were completed.

At the July town hall, Boyer responded to a community rumor that Radiant had paid him for his support. The reporting did not identify a named source for the allegation. Boyer said, "I've never taken money. I wouldn't ever take money. I didn't go to Iraq, serve my country for eight years, bleed, watch my friends die so I can be accused of bribery." He described the allegation and the hostility surrounding the project as unacceptable.

Bar Nunn town council member Dan Sabrosky wrote after the meeting that some residents were tired of "controlled Townhalls" and being given false information intended to frighten them. He said residents who independently studied the nuclear industry had reached different conclusions about its safety. Boyer later attributed most of the vitriol surrounding the proposal to state legislators and said they should have studied the subject more carefully before attempting to influence the town.

=== Radiant's withdrawal ===
In October 2025, Radiant announced that it would locate the factory in Oak Ridge, Tennessee, rather than Natrona County. Senior director of operations Matt Wilson said the decision came down to regulatory certainty. Wyoming law allowed spent fuel to be stored only at an operating reactor site, and lawmakers had not enacted the exception the manufacturing plan required.

Tennessee officials announced that Radiant would invest $280 million and create 175 jobs in Roane County. The state supported the development through its Nuclear Energy Fund, and Radiant became the sixth company to locate in Tennessee using that program. The planned Tennessee investment was substantially larger than the more than $150 million proposal discussed in Wyoming, although the two project descriptions were issued at different stages of development.

Tennessee officials welcomed the project as an economic and technological gain. Governor Bill Lee said Tennessee was emerging as a national leader in clean and reliable energy and that Radiant would play a "vital role" globally by producing the first mass-manufactured nuclear microreactor in Oak Ridge. State Economic and Community Development Commissioner Stuart McWhorter called the company's $280 million investment and 175 planned jobs "a critical win" for Tennessee's nuclear sector. Roane County Executive Wade Creswell described the county as "the most nuclear-friendly community in the country" and told Radiant, "We are proud to welcome you home." Oak Ridge Mayor Warren Gooch said Radiant represented the kind of advanced nuclear company the city's economic-development organization had been established to attract. State Senator Ken Yager called the project "a tremendous win" that would benefit the region's workforce and economy.

Governor Mark Gordon blamed the project's loss on the Freedom Caucus and accused it of "Club No" tactics and fearmongering. He said the caucus had focused on objections rather than discussing ways to solve the project's unresolved issues. Gordon contrasted Wyoming's response with Tennessee's willingness to pursue nuclear manufacturing under the federal government's energy policy and warned that Wyoming could either participate in emerging industries or "gently coast into oblivion." He said Wyoming should be a state to which companies turned for regulatory clarity, infrastructure and partnership.

Allemand said he was "elated" that Radiant had abandoned its Wyoming proposal and described the outcome as a fight he had pursued on behalf of his constituents. He dismissed the projected economic loss, again questioning the jobs and wages. Boyer called the withdrawal a major lost opportunity and said lawmakers bore most of the responsibility for the hostility surrounding the project.

== Criminal history ==
=== 2001 domestic-battery case ===
In 2001, while living in Kansas, Allemand was charged with misdemeanor domestic battery. According to court records reviewed by WyoFile, prosecutors alleged that he intentionally made physical contact with another person in a rude, insulting or angry manner.

Allemand entered a 12-month pretrial diversion agreement. Diversion suspended prosecution while requiring him to obey the law, abstain from alcohol and illegal drugs and complete domestic-violence education. The charge was dismissed after he completed the agreement. A diversion and subsequent dismissal do not constitute a criminal conviction, but the documented agreement required Allemand to comply with those conditions for a year.

When WyoFile asked about the case in 2026, Allemand said, "It never happened. It was dismissed because it didn't happen." The publication contrasted that response with the court record showing that he entered and completed the diversion agreement. The available reporting did not establish that a court adjudicated the underlying allegation.

=== 2009 protection-order violation ===
In December 2009, Kansas authorities charged Allemand with violating a protection order, criminal trespass and telephone harassment. Prosecutors alleged that he went to an address from which the order prohibited him and called the protected person 27 times in one day.

Allemand pleaded no contest to violating the protection order. The trespass and harassment charges were dropped. The court imposed a six-month jail sentence and a $200 fine, suspended the jail term, and placed him on 12 months of nonreporting probation. Conditions included no contact with the protected person and completion of a domestic-violence assessment and any recommendations resulting from it.

When WyoFile asked about the proceeding in 2026, Allemand said, "I know nothing about that." The publication cited the Kansas court docket, plea and sentence in reporting the case.

=== 2025 arrest for driving under the influence ===
On December 28, 2025, a citizen made a REDDI, or Report Every Drunk Driver Immediately, report identifying Allemand's vehicle as a possible intoxicated driver on Interstate 90 near Buffalo, Wyoming. A Johnson County sheriff's deputy located the vehicle and observed Allemand begin moving through an intersection before stopping abruptly just short of an approaching vehicle. The deputy followed him to Miller's Travel Center, at 74 East U.S. Highway 16 in Buffalo, and initiated a traffic stop.

The deputy reported finding an open beer can and four unopened cans in the vehicle, along with a loaded handgun. Allemand said he had consumed two beers. The state later reported that a blood test showed a blood-alcohol concentration of 0.24 percent, three times Wyoming's general legal limit of 0.08 percent. Allemand and his attorney disputed the accuracy and admissibility of the result. Mothers Against Drunk Driving identifies alcohol-impaired driving as a major preventable cause of traffic death.

Allemand was jailed following the arrest and was released after serving two days.

=== Anxiety explanation and body-camera footage ===
Body-camera footage showed Allemand telling the deputy that interstate driving caused him anxiety and that drinking beer made the experience easier. He said, "I have a little bit of a problem ... anxieties of driving down interstates. Two-lane do not bother me, but interstates bother me." He added that although he knew drinking while driving was illegal, beer made his anxiety "so much better."

The National Institute on Alcohol Abuse and Alcoholism states that alcohol may temporarily reduce anxiety symptoms but that repeated or heavy use can worsen anxiety and reinforce maladaptive drinking. The National Institute of Mental Health identifies psychotherapy, medication or a combination of the two, selected with a healthcare professional, as established approaches to treating anxiety disorders.

After the footage was released, Allemand argued that the traffic stop was unjustified and told WyoFile that it "shows that I was not drunk" but instead showed how law enforcement had treated him. WyoFile reported that the recording showed him speaking slowly and repeatedly questioning the reason for the stop. The stop followed the independent REDDI report and the deputy's observation of Allemand stopping just short of a passing vehicle. Magistrate Judge Jeremy Kisling later ruled that the report and perceived traffic violation provided reasonable suspicion and probable cause for the stop and that indications of intoxication justified extending the investigation.

Kisling excluded statements made after Allemand had been handcuffed and questioned without first receiving a Miranda warning. The ruling concerned whether the statements could be used at trial, not whether the earlier traffic stop was lawful. Reporting on the footage said Allemand made additional remarks at the detention center, including telling a male officer, "If you were a woman, I would like this," and calling attention to a belt buckle associated with Honor Wyoming.

Honor Wyoming is a political advocacy organization that produces the Wyoming Political Integrity Index, a legislative scorecard. The organization says it evaluates votes against provisions of the Constitution of the United States, the Wyoming Constitution and each legislator's political-party platform. It classifies legislators as "Top Hands", "Fence Sitters" or "Clowns" according to its scoring system.

While the case was pending, the court required Allemand to undergo random alcohol testing. He asked that testing be suspended while he attended the 2026 legislative budget session in Cheyenne, Wyoming. The court denied the request, leaving the testing condition in effect while he performed his legislative duties.

Former Wyoming Freedom Caucus chairman John Bear said that if Allemand had a problem, he hoped Allemand would obtain help. Rob Hendry, a former Natrona County Republican Party chairman and legislative candidate, said it was "sad" that a state legislator and Appropriations Committee member had been drinking and driving. Boyer called the footage "damning", said it was obvious to him that Allemand had a drinking problem and said he hoped Allemand entered treatment. Allemand said he had stopped drinking, had never been a heavy drinker and had experienced no side effects from quitting.

=== Guilty plea and sentence ===
On July 15, 2026, Allemand pleaded guilty to driving under the influence. The court imposed a 90-day jail sentence, credited the two days he had already served and suspended the remaining 88 days in favor of one year of unsupervised probation. He was ordered to pay a $500 fine and $270 in fees.

The probation conditions required Allemand to practice abstinence from alcohol and controlled substances without a prescription, avoid bars and liquor stores, complete a substance-abuse evaluation and follow treatment recommendations. For the first six months, he was subject to one or two random chemical tests per month. The order permitted blood, breath or urine testing based on reasonable articulable suspicion.

Two days after entering the plea, Allemand said, "I do apologize for drinking while driving on a public road." He acknowledged that his conduct could have produced more serious consequences, said he began counseling after the legislative session and reported that he had abstained from alcohol since the arrest. He continued to dispute the state's reported test result but said he pleaded guilty because drinking and driving had been wrong.

== 2026 campaign ==
Allemand sought a third term in 2026 against Boyer. Their campaign centered in part on the collapse of the Radiant proposal, with Boyer describing it as a lost economic opportunity and Allemand defending his opposition to spent-fuel storage.

The DUI case also became a campaign issue. Allemand's July guilty plea confirmed that he had driven after drinking, resulted in a suspended jail sentence and probation, and generated renewed reporting on two Kansas cases. In the 2001 case, a domestic-battery charge was dismissed after Allemand completed a year-long diversion agreement. In the 2009 case, he pleaded no contest to violating a protection order and received a suspended jail sentence and probation.

Boyer criticized Allemand's handling of both the nuclear project and the DUI case. Allemand narrowly retained the Republican nomination, receiving 800 votes to Boyer's 773 in unofficial results.
