= Dan Dockstader =

American politician

President of the Wyoming Senate
- In office January 12, 2021 – January 10, 2023
- Preceded by: Drew Perkins
- Succeeded by: Ogden Driskill

Majority Leader of the Wyoming Senate
- In office January 9, 2019 – January 12, 2021
- Preceded by: Drew Perkins
- Succeeded by: Ogden Driskill

Member of the Wyoming Senate from the 16th district
- Incumbent
- Assumed office January 5, 2009
- Preceded by: Pat Aullman

Member of the Wyoming House of Representatives from the 21st district
- In office January 3, 2007 – January 5, 2009
- Preceded by: Randall Luthi
- Succeeded by: Robert McKim

Personal details
- Born: February 13, 1958 (age 68) Idaho Falls, Idaho, U.S.
- Party: Republican
- Spouse: Kim
- Children: 4
- Education: Brigham Young University (BA)

Dan Dockstader (born February 13, 1958) is a Republican member of the Wyoming Senate, representing the 16th district since 2009. Previously he served in the House from 2007 to 2008. He also served as the President of the Wyoming State Senate.

Don Dockstader is adamantly against decriminalizing marijuana. In 2021, he said, "I don't care if 90% of my constituents want it, I'm voting against it, it'll never come to the senate."

== Personal life ==
Dockstader was born in the town of Idaho Falls on 13 February 1958. He has four children and one grandchild. Dockstader is a member of The Church of Jesus Christ of Latter-day Saints.

Wyoming Senate
Preceded by Drew Perkins	Majority Leader of the Wyoming Senate; 2019–2021	Succeeded by Ogden Driskill
Political offices
Preceded by Drew Perkins	President of the Wyoming Senate; 2021–2023	Succeeded by Ogden Driskill
