= Wyoming State Capitol =

State capitol building of the U.S. state of Wyoming

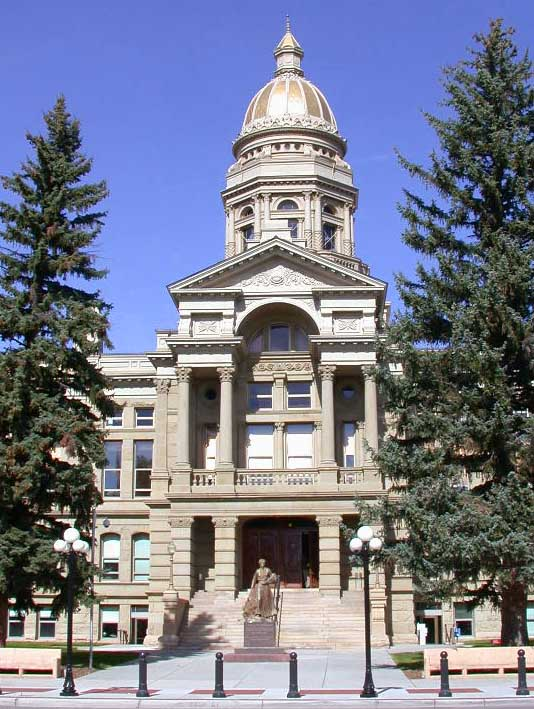
- Wyoming State Capitol, seen from rear.
- Interactive map of the Wyoming State Capitol area

General information
- Architectural style: Renaissance Revival
- Location: 200 W. 24th St., Cheyenne, Wyoming, United States
- Coordinates: 41°8′25″N 104°49′11″W
- Construction started: 1886; 140 years ago
- Completed: 1890; 136 years ago
- Cost: $150,000
- Client: State of Wyoming

Design and construction
- Architects: David Williams Gibbs and William DuBois
- Engineer: Adam Feick & Bro.; Moses B. Keefe; John W. Howard
- Wyoming State Capitol and Grounds
- U.S. National Register of Historic Places
- U.S. National Historic Landmark
- Area: 4 acres (1.6 ha)
- NRHP reference No.: 73001935

Significant dates
- Added to NRHP: January 29, 1973
- Designated NHL: May 4, 1987

The Wyoming State Capitol is located in the city of Cheyenne. Cheyenne is the seat of government for the U.S. state of Wyoming, also hosting the workspace for the governor, Mark Gordon, and his staff. Built between 1886 and 1890, the capitol is located in Cheyenne and contains the chambers of the Wyoming State Legislature as well as the office of the Governor of Wyoming. It was designated a U.S. National Historic Landmark in 1987. The Capitol underwent an extensive three-year renovation and reopened to the public on July 10, 2019.

== History ==
The construction of the capitol began prior to Wyoming gaining statehood. Cheyenne was born in 1867 in the path of the transcontinental railroad, when the Union Pacific crews arrived to lay tracks westward. Cheyenne soon laid claim to a higher status than older Wyoming settlements such as those at Fort Laramie, Fort Bridger, and the mining town of South Pass City, changing Cheyenne from a village to a city in a matter of months. The seat of the new Territorial government was established in Cheyenne in 1869.

In 1886, the Ninth Territorial Legislative Assembly authorized construction of the State Capitol. A five-member commission, appointed by Governor Francis E. Warren, was charged with the selection and purchase of the site, selection of an architect and accepting the lowest bids for construction of the building. The commission chose the firm of David W. Gibbs & Company, Architects, to draw plans and specifications. These were accepted in July 1886 and a contract issued to the lowest bidder, Adam Feick & Brother, who broke ground on September 9, 1886.

The Tenth Territorial Legislative Assembly convened in the unfinished building. The two small wings on the east and west were completed in 1890. Crowded conditions persisted with the growth of the state and in 1915 the Thirteenth legislature approved the construction of the House and Senate Chambers, which were completed in March 1917.

The 42nd Legislature in 1974 appropriated funds for the first phase of renovation of the capitol and the project was completed in 1980. Work included stripping and staining all woodwork, painting walls in the original designs and colors, replacing wooden floor beams with steel, concrete and modernizing the wiring, heating, plumbing and air conditioning.

In 2013, the Wyoming State Legislature created a task force to examine potential renovations to the building. The Legislature authorized the renovation project in 2014 with work on the Capitol, the Herschler Building, the utility plant and the tunnels to be completed as a unified project with a budget of $299 million. The project was completed in 2019.

The building was designated a National Historic Landmark in 1987, for its role in Wyoming's history, including specifically the role it played in hosting conventions that ensured woman's suffrage in the state constitution.

== Description ==
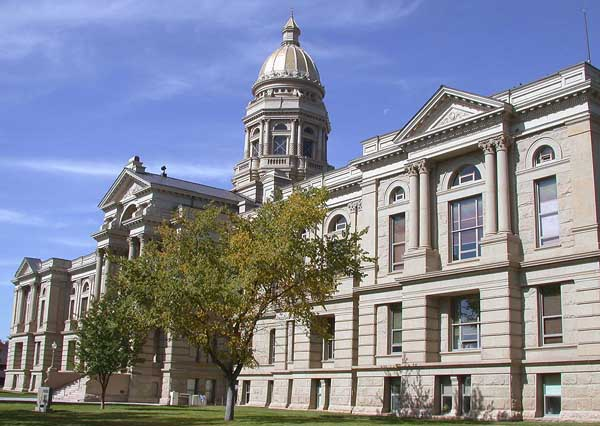
The facade as it was extended during 1915 with the House and Senate chambers in the end pavilions

The capitol is located north of downtown Cheyenne. The exterior approach to the front steps of the capitol features the State Seal in granite.

The architecture of the building is Renaissance Revival, reminiscent of the United States Capitol in Washington, D.C. The sandstone for the building came from quarries in Rawlins, Wyoming, and Fort Collins, Colorado. The building's cornerstone was laid on May 18, 1887, with maps, a roster of territorial officers, and other papers inside. During the Centennial of the Capitol in 1987; the cornerstone was removed, these documents were replaced and the cornerstone reset.

While standing in the center of the rotunda, looking up at the base of the dome directly overhead you see the stained glass, imported from England. From underneath it sparkles with blue, purple, and green hues, but the upper side glistens with red, yellow, and orange. The peak of the dome is 146 feet high, and the base is 50 feet in diameter.

The first-floor rotunda is designed with checkerboard marble floors, columns, and a staircase made of cherry wood brought from Ohio.

The Governor is the only elected official with offices in the capitol building. The four other elected officials have ceremonial offices only.

The Senate chamber is in the west wing of the second-floor building; the House chamber is in the east wing of the second floor. Each chamber contains four large murals by Allen Tupper True, who painted them in August 1917 for a cost of $500 each. The murals depict various aspects of the culture, history, and industry of Wyoming. The murals in the Senate chamber are entitled Indian Chief Cheyenne, Frontier Cavalry Officer, Pony Express Rider, and Railroad Builders/Surveyors. The House murals are entitled Cattlemen, Trappers, Homesteaders, and Stagecoach. The ceilings of both chambers are inlaid with stained glass from the Midland Paint and Glass Company of Omaha, NE, with the Wyoming State Seal displayed in the center. Both chambers are accessible to visitors by balconies on the third floor. The House has two oil paintings by William Gollings. The wood in both chambers is oak.

== Renovation ==
The Wyoming State Capitol went through a major restoration between 2016 and 2019. Many improvements were made during this time. Some of the improvements included: the addition of stairs, elevators, and restrooms; the restoration of decorative paintings and moldings; and the improvement of the electrical and HVAC systems. During the restoration phase, there were several discoveries of paintings, decorated architectural elements, and woodwork that were all carefully restored. Another major part of the restoration project was to gain back some of the visibility of the dome on the building. To be able to view the dome from North Capitol Avenue, a large atrium on an adjacent building was demolished.

=== The Dome ===
The dome is one of the key architectural features of the Capitol building. It stands out above the skyline, representing Wyoming's values. The Dome of the capitol is copper and it tarnished so badly in 1900 they began using gold leaf on the exterior of the dome. The 24-carat gold leaf dome is visible from all roads entering the city. It has been gilded five times, the first in 1900. Only ten out of the fifty United States have gold leaf covered domes on their state capitol buildings. In 2009, the dome was re-covered in gold for $1.3 million. During the restoration process that took place between 2016 and 2019, scaffolding was used to cover the dome until the work on it was complete. The interior dome structure is covered in the signatures of the workers who built the dome. Others have added their signatures over the years up to the present day. Thanks to this restoration work, the dome's life expectancy went from a mere 15 years to 90 years.

=== The Vaults ===
On the Garden Level of the Capitol, there sit six vaults that were covered in layers of paint. During the restoration, this paint was carefully removed, to reveal unique paintings hiding beneath, one for each vault door. These vaults were found to have been made by Mosler Safe and Lock Company, which was a well-distinguished safe company at the time. This company was originally called Mosler, Bahmann and Company and was located in Cincinnati, Ohio. Mosler's sons would later take over the business and move it to Hamilton, Ohio, where it would be run under the name Mosler Safe and Lock Company.

== Gallery ==
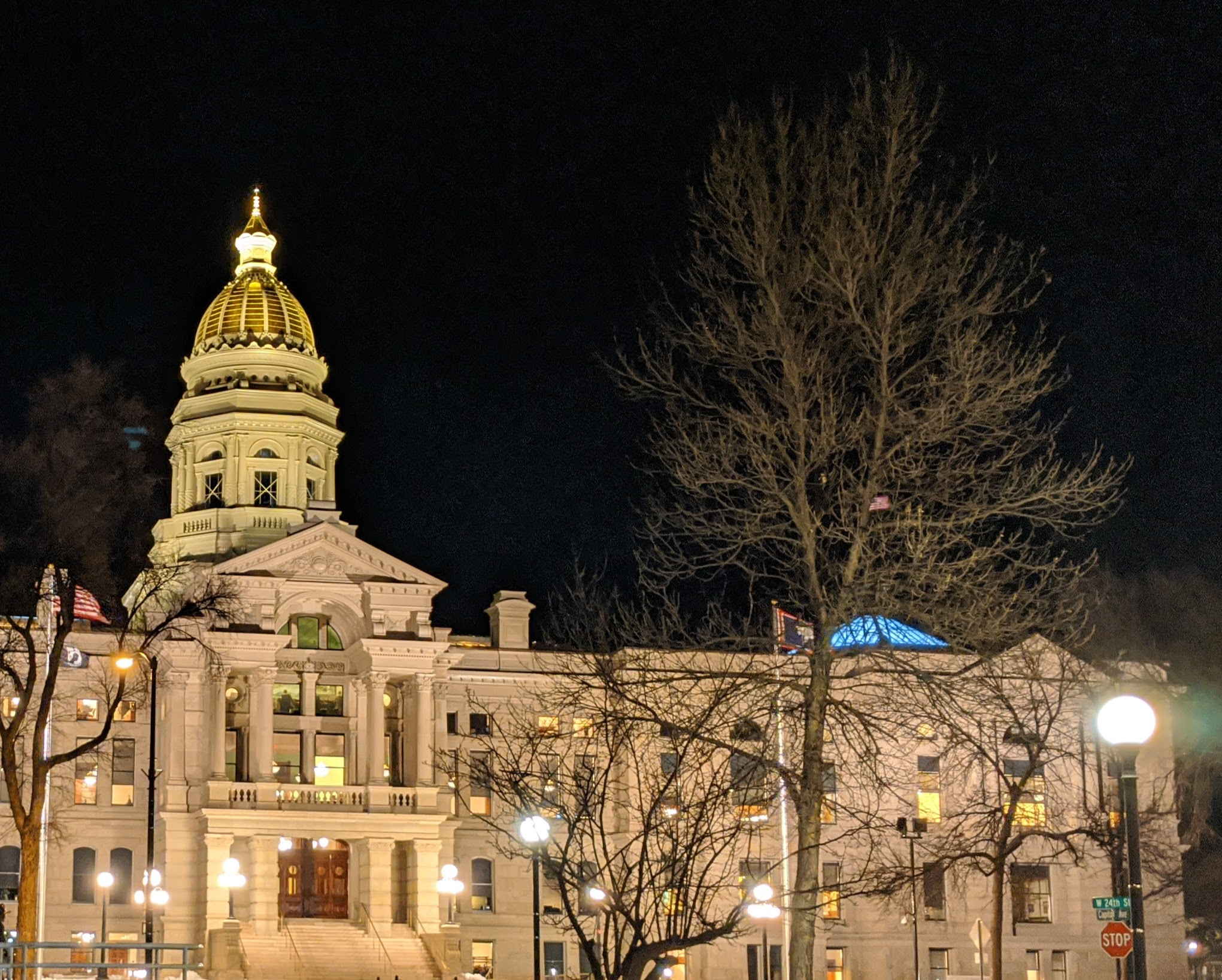
Front of the Capitol

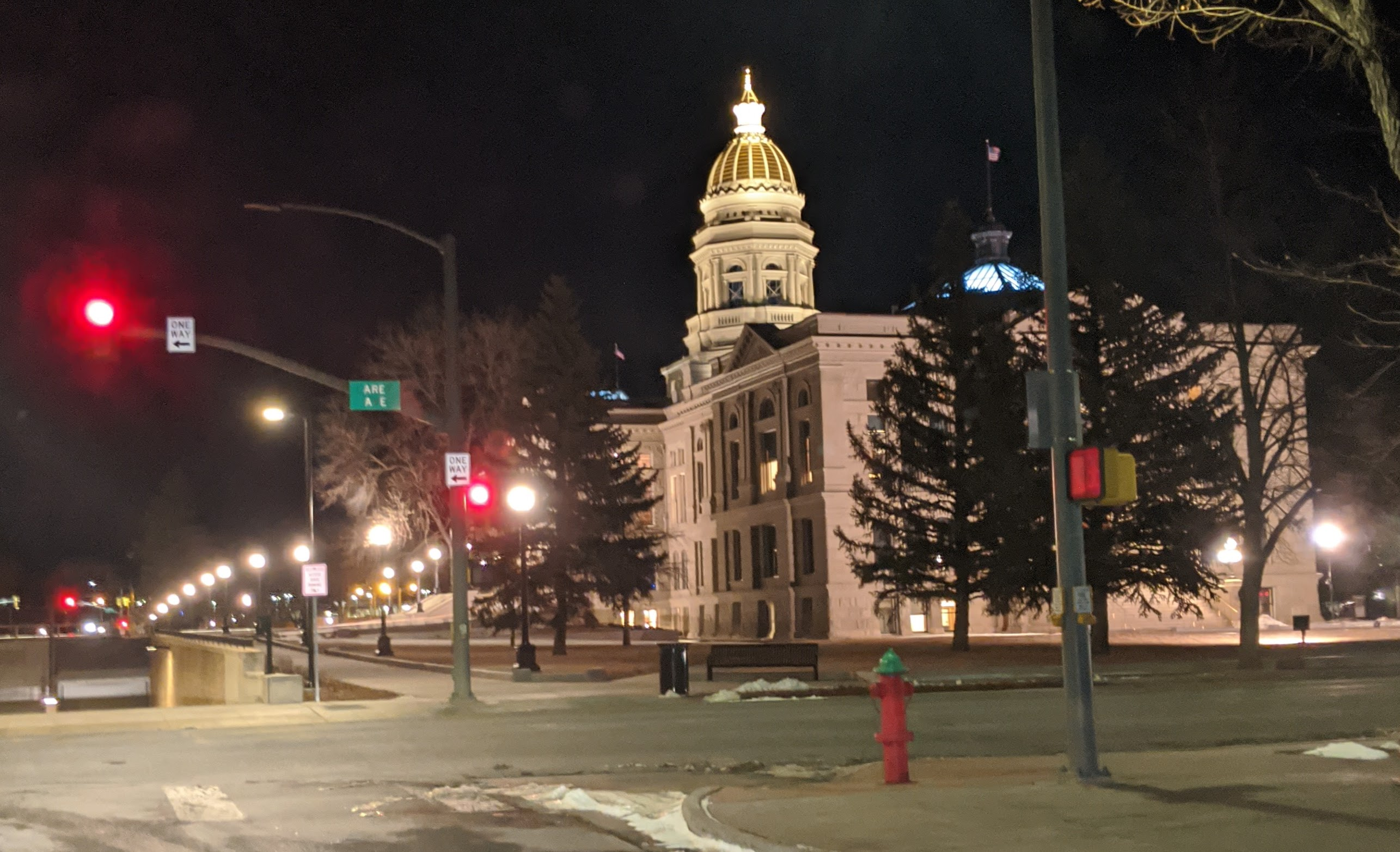
Rear/west side of the Capitol

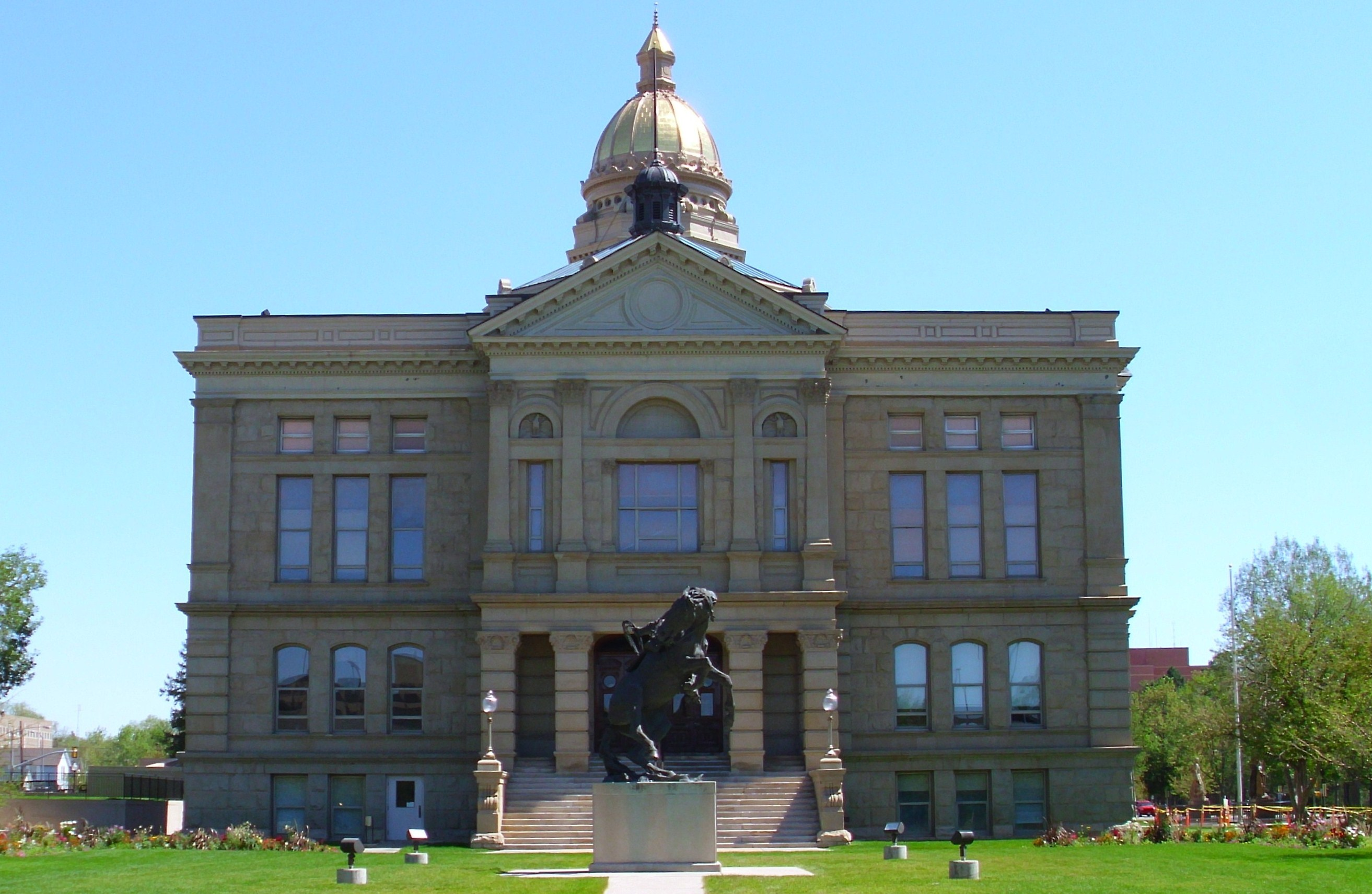
West entrance of the Capitol

House Chambers

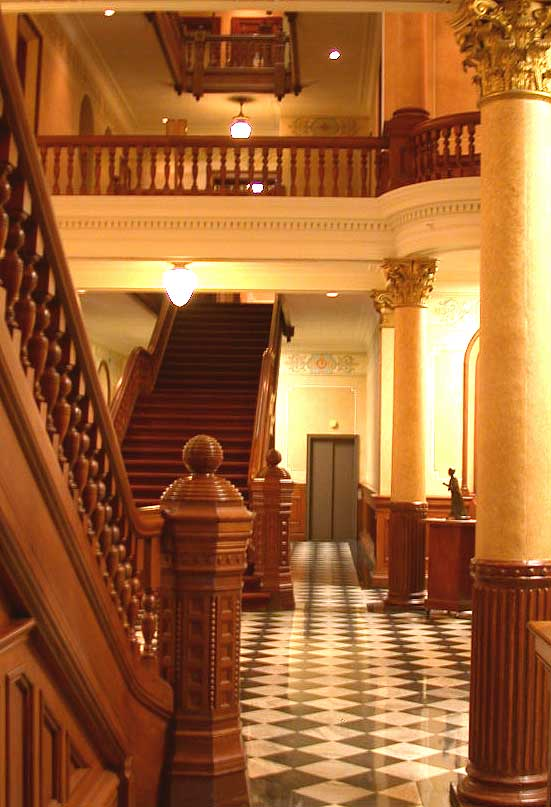
View of the first floor, showing Corinthian design in column.

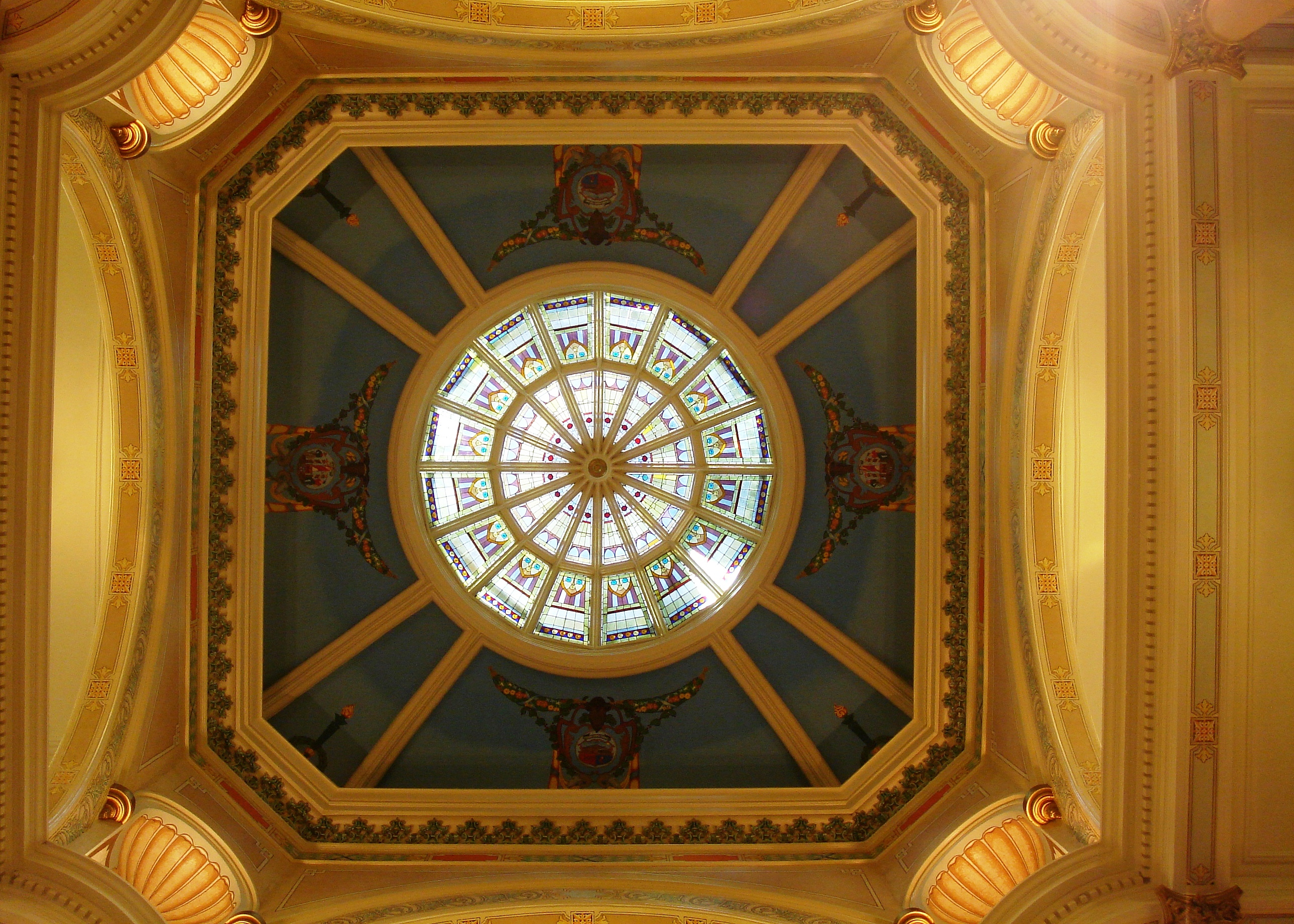
Interior Dome

== See also ==
- List of Wyoming state legislatures
- List of state and territorial capitols in the United States
- List of National Historic Landmarks in Wyoming
- National Register of Historic Places listings in Laramie County, Wyoming
