= 1992 Wyoming Senate election =

- November 3, 1992

30 seats in the Wyoming Senate
	Majority party	Minority party
Leader	Diemer True (retiring)	Frank Prevedel
Party	Republican	Democratic
Leader's seat	Natrona	Sweetwater
Seats before	20	10
Seats after	20	10
Seat change	Steady	Steady
Popular vote	101,942	79,892
Percentage	55.56%	43.55%
- Results by margin
Senate President before election
Diemer True
Republican
Elected Senate President
Jerry B. Dixon
Republican

The 1992 Wyoming Senate election was held on November 3, 1992, to elect members to the Wyoming Senate for its 52nd session as part of the 1992 United States elections. Partisan primaries were held on August 18. This was the first state senate election held after the state's county-based apportionment plan was struck down by the courts in Gorin v. Karpan in favor of a single-member district plan. As a result, every senator was up for re-election.

The election was held concurrently with elections for the state house, U.S. representative, and U.S. president.

== Summary ==
Original county-based apportionment of the Wyoming Senate before the Gorin v. Karpan ruling

Party	Candidates			Seats
Party	Num.	Vote	%	Up	Won	+/–
Republicans	27	101,942	55.56%	20	20	Steady
Democrats	23	79,892	43.55%	10	10	Steady
Libertarians	3	1,633	0.89%	0	0	Steady
Totals	53	183,467	100.00%	30

County	Incumbent		Notes	District	Elected
County	Party	Senator	Notes	District	Party	Senator
Albany	Rep.	Terry Guice	Incumbent defeated in the general election for SD 10.	SD 1	Rep.	Jerry Dixon
Albany	Dem.	Lisa Kinney	Incumbent elected to SD 9.	SD 2	Rep.	Jim Twiford
Big Horn	Rep.	Allan Howard	Incumbent defeated in the Republican primary for SD 19.	SD 3	Rep.	Jim Geringer
Carbon	Rep.	Bob Grieve	Incumbent elected to SD 11.	SD 4	Rep.	April Brimmer-Kunz
Converse	Rep.	Jim Twiford	Incumbent elected to SD 2.	SD 5	Rep.	Cynthia Lummis
Fremont	Rep.	Frank Dusl	Incumbent did not stand for re-election.	SD 6	Dem.	Rich Cathcart
Fremont	Dem.	John Vinich	Incumbent elected to SD 25.	SD 7	Dem.	Guy Cameron
Hot Springs—Washakie	Rep.	Mike Healy	Incumbent did not stand for re-election.	SD 8	Dem.	James L. Applegate
Johnson—Campbell	Rep.	Mike Enzi	Incumbent elected to SD 24.	SD 9	Dem.	Lisa Kinney
Johnson—Campbell	Rep.	John R. Perry	Incumbent did not stand for re-election.	SD 10	Dem.	Pete Maxfield
Laramie	Dem.	James L. Applegate	Incumbent elected to SD 8.	SD 11	Rep.	Bob Grieve
Laramie	Dem.	Liz Byrd	Incumbent defeated in the general election for SD 5.	SD 12	Dem.	Frank Pevedel
Laramie	Dem.	Guy Cameron	Incumbent elected to SD 7.	SD 13	Dem.	Carl Maldonado
Laramie	Rep.	Gary Yordy	Incumbent did not stand for re-election.	SD 14	Dem.	Mark O. Harris
Lincoln	Rep.	Boyd Eddins	Incumbent elected to SD 16.	SD 15	Dem.	Gregory Phillips
Natrona	Rep.	Mike Burke	Incumbent defeated in the Republican primary for SD 28.	SD 16	Rep.	Boyd Eddins
Natrona	Rep.	Charles K. Scott	Incumbent elected to SD 30.	SD 17	Rep.	Bob LaLonde
Natrona	Rep.	Diemer True	Incumbent did not stand for re-election.	SD 18	Rep.	Hank Coe
Natrona	Rep.	Gail Zimmerman	Incumbent elected to SD 27.	SD 19	Rep.	Carroll Miller
Niobrara—Goshen	Rep.	Russell Zimmer	Incumbent did not stand for re-election.	SD 20	Rep.	John Rankine
Park	Rep.	Hank Coe	Incumbent elected to SD 18.	SD 21	Rep.	Tom Kinnison
Platte	Rep.	Jim Geringer	Incumbent elected to SD 3.	SD 22	Rep.	Robert Trent
Sheridan	Dem.	Della Herbst	Incumbent did not stand for re-election.	SD 23	Rep.	Larry Gilbertz
Sheridan	Rep.	Tom Kinnison	Incumbent elected to SD 21.	SD 24	Rep.	Mike Enzi
Sweetwater	Dem.	Carl Maldonado	Incumbent elected to SD 13.	SD 25	Dem.	John Vinich
Sweetwater	Dem.	Frank Prevedel	Incumbent elected to SD 12.	SD 26	Rep.	Bob Peck
Sweetwater	Dem.	Robert Reese	Incumbent did not stand for re-election.	SD 27	Rep.	Gail Zimmerman
Teton—Sublette	Rep.	Bob LaLonde	Incumbent elected to SD 17.	SD 28	Rep.	Susan Anderson
Uinta	Dem.	John Fanos	Incumbent did not stand for re-election.	SD 29	Rep.	Barbara Cubin
Weston—Crook	Rep.	Jerry Dixon	Incumbent elected to SD 1.	SD 30	Rep.	Charles K. Scott

== Detailed election results ==
=== General election ===
To ease sorting, races won by a Republican candidate have a positive margin, while races won by Democratic candidates have negative margins.

District	Republicans			Democrats			Libertarians			Total
District	Candidate	Vote	%	Candidate	Vote	%	Candidate	Vote	%	Total	Maj.	%
SD 1	Jerry Dixon	4,418	63.44	Francie Hiday	2,546	36.56	—	—	—	6,964	+1,872	+26.88
SD 2	Jim Twiford	3,787	56.02	Cisco R. Valdez	2,973	43.98	—	—	—	6,760	+814	+12.04
SD 3	Jim Geringer	6,097	100.00	—	—	—	—	—	—	6,760	+6,097	+100.00
SD 4	April Brimmer-Kunz	3,917	53.82	Pat Hacker	3,361	46.18	—	—	—	7,278	+556	+7.64
SD 5	Cynthia Lummis	3,434	52.86	Liz Byrd	3,062	47.14	—	—	—	6,496	+372	+5.73
SD 6	Richard Larson	2,300	37.18	Rich Cathcart	3,886	62.82	—	—	—	6,186	-1,586	-25.64
SD 7	Carl LeJambre III	1,570	26.80	Guy Cameron	4,289	73.20	—	—	—	5,859	-2,719	-46.41
SD 8	Sheldon Campbell	1,471	30.27	James L. Applegate	3,389	69.73	—	—	—	4,860	-1,918	-39.47
SD 9	Roger Britton	1,901	31.45	Lisa Kinney	4,143	68.55	—	—	—	6,044	-2,242	-37.09
SD 10	Terry L. Guice	2,840	44.87	Pete Maxfield	3,489	55.13	—	—	—	6,329	-649	-10.25
SD 11	Bob Grieve	4,725	100.00	—	—	—	—	—	—	4,725	+4,725	+100.00
SD 12	—	—	—	Frank Prevedel	4,723	100.00	—	—	—	4,723	-4,723	-100.00
SD 13	—	—	—	Charley Maldonado	4,675	100.00	—	—	—	4,675	-4,675	-100.00
SD 14	—	—	—	Mark O. Harris	3,984	100.00	—	—	—	3,984	-3,984	-100.00
SD 15	Janice Bodine	2,267	40.88	Greg Philips	3,278	59.12	—	—	—	5,545	-1,011	-18.23
SD 16	Boyd Eddins	5,609	100.00	—	—	—	—	—	—	5,609	+5,609	+100.00
SD 17	Bob LaLonde	5,761	55.93	Mike Gierau	4,539	44.07	—	—	—	10,300	+1,222	+11.86
SD 18	Hank Coe	5,882	100.00	—	—	—	—	—	—	5,882	+5,882	+100.00
SD 19	Carroll Miller	5,041	82.65	—	—	—	Frank Hart	1,058	17.35	6,099	+3,983	+65.31
SD 20	John Rankine	3,895	56.14	Mike Hanify	3,043	43.86	—	—	—	6,938	+852	+12.28
SD 21	Tom Kinnison	4,274	61.28	Don Finzer	2,700	38.72	—	—	—	6,974	+1,574	+22.57
SD 22	Robert Trent	3,698	51.71	Peggy Sanders	3,453	48.29	—	—	—	7,151	+245	+3.43
SD 23	Larry Gilbertz	2,598	50.28	Sandy Daly	2,569	49.72	—	—	—	5,167	+29	+0.56
SD 24	Mike Enzi	4,733	100.00	—	—	—	—	—	—	4,733	+4,733	+100.00
SD 25	Clint Dunning	2,437	38.77	John Vinich	3,849	61.23	—	—	—	6,286	-1,412	-22.46
SD 26	Bob Peck	4,922	100.00	—	—	—	—	—	—	4,922	+4,922	+100.00
SD 27	Gail Zimmerman	3,661	51.77	Robert Penney	3,151	44.56	Dick Sunderman	260	3.68	7,072	+510	+7.21
SD 28	Susan Anderson	3,374	50.27	Keith Goodenough	3,338	49.73	—	—	—	6,712	+36	+0.54
SD 29	Barbara Cubin	4,275	58.08	Ruth Komma	2,771	37.64	Margaret Dawson	315	4.28	7,361	+1,504	+20.43
SD 30	Charles K. Scott	3,055	53.26	Michael Rogers	2,681	46.74	—	—	—	5,736	+374	+6.52

SD 23's results were voided for Precinct 1-8 due to voters receiving incorrect ballots, and a new election was called for November 24.

==== SD 23 special election ====
Candidates	Precinct 1-8				Total
Candidates	General		Special		General		Special
Candidates	Vote	%	Vote	%	Vote	%	Vote	%
Larry Gilbertz	35	43.75	87	58.78	2,598	50.28	2,655	50.65
Sandy Daly	45	56.25	61	41.22	2,569	49.72	2,587	49.35
Total	80	100.00	148	100.00	5,167	100.00	5,242	100.00
Majority					+29	+0.56	+68	+1.30

==== Close races ====
The following races were decided by fewer than 5 points (3 races, all won by Republicans):

1. SD 28, 0.54% (36 votes) – Susan Anderson (Rep.)
2. SD 23, 0.56% (29 votes) – Larry Gilbertz (Rep.) (PARTIALLY VOIDED)
3. SD 23, 1.30% (68 votes) – Larry Gilbertz (Rep.) (RE-VOTE)
4. SD 22, 3.43% (245 votes) – Robert Trent (Rep.)

The following races were decided by fewer than 15 points (8 races, 7 won by Republicans, 1 won by a Democrat):

1. SD 5, 5.73% (372 votes) – Cynthia Lummis (Rep.)
2. SD 30, 6.52% (374 votes) – Charles K. Scott (Rep.)
3. SD 27, 7.21% (510 votes) – Gail Zimmerman (Rep.)
4. SD 4, 7.64% (556 votes) – April Brimmer-Kunz (Rep.)
5. SD 10, 10.25% (649 votes) – Pete Maxfield (Dem.)
6. SD 17, 11.86% (1,222 votes) – Bob LaLonde (Rep.)
7. SD 2, 12.04% (814 votes) – Jim Twiford (Rep.)
8. SD 2, 12.28% (852 votes) – John Rankine (Rep.)

=== Republican primaries ===
For the sake of brevity, races in which no candidates filed will not be shown.

District	Winners			Runners-up									Total
District	Candidate	Vote	%	Candidate	Vote	%	Candidate	Vote	%	Candidate	Vote	%	Total	Maj.	%
SD 1	Jerry Dixon	2,551	100.00	—	—	—	—	—	—	—	—	—	2,551	2,551	100.00
SD 2	Jim Twiford	2,603	100.00	—	—	—	—	—	—	—	—	—	2,603	2,603	100.00
SD 3	Jim Geringer	1,650	50.47	Richard Campbell	768	23.49	Lois Van Mark	548	16.76	Robert Quade	303	9.27	3,269	882	26.98
SD 4	April Brimmer-Kunz	2,183	100.00	—	—	—	—	—	—	—	—	—	2,183	2,183	100.00
SD 5	Cynthia Lummis	1,720	75.64	Norman P. Feagler	554	24.36	—	—	—	—	—	—	2,274	1,166	51.28
SD 6	Richard Larson	1,240	63.33	Leonard O. Mosher	482	24.62	Donn Edmunds	236	12.05	—	—	—	1,958	758	38.71
SD 7	Carl LeJambre III	1,397	100.00	—	—	—	—	—	—	—	—	—	1,397	1,397	100.00
SD 8	Sheldon Campbell	482	52.45	Larry J. Harmon	437	47.55	—	—	—	—	—	—	919	45	4.90
SD 9	Roger G. Britton	593	66.93	J. O. Mingle	293	33.07	—	—	—	—	—	—	886	300	33.86
SD 10	Terry Guice	1,180	100.00	—	—	—	—	—	—	—	—	—	1,180	1,180	100.00
SD 11	Bob Grieve	1,336	100.00	—	—	—	—	—	—	—	—	—	1,336	1,336	100.00
SD 15	Janice Bodine	825	51.95	Ken Robison	763	48.05	—	—	—	—	—	—	1,588	62	3.90
SD 16	Boyd Eddins	2,414	100.00	—	—	—	—	—	—	—	—	—	2,414	2,414	100.00
SD 17	Bob LaLonde	2,829	100.00	—	—	—	—	—	—	—	—	—	2,829	2,829	100.00
SD 18	Hank Coe	3,461	100.00	—	—	—	—	—	—	—	—	—	3,461	3,461	100.00
SD 19	Carroll Miller	2,076	57.51	Allan Howard	1,534	42.49	—	—	—	—	—	—	3,610	542	15.01
SD 20	John Rankine	1,938	61.17	Thomas Chaffer	1,230	38.83	—	—	—	—	—	—	3,168	708	22.35
SD 21	Tim Kinnison	1,647	73.72	Ed Miller	587	26.28	—	—	—	—	—	—	2,234	1,060	47.45
SD 22	Robert Trent	1,631	51.52	Don Odegard	1,535	48.48	—	—	—	—	—	—	3,166	96	3.03
SD 23	Larry Gilbertz	1,869	100.00	—	—	—	—	—	—	—	—	—	1,869	1,869	100.00
SD 24	Mike Enzi	2,409	100.00	—	—	—	—	—	—	—	—	—	2,409	2,409	100.00
SD 25	Clint Dunning	1,534	100.00	—	—	—	—	—	—	—	—	—	1,534	1,534	100.00
SD 26	Bob Peck	1,937	100.00	—	—	—	—	—	—	—	—	—	1,937	1,937	100.00
SD 27	Gail Zimmerman	1,816	73.20	Philip McCauley	665	26.80	—	—	—	—	—	—	2,481	1,151	46.39
SD 28	Susan Anderson	1,390	57.80	Mike Burke	1,015	42.20	—	—	—	—	—	—	2,405	375	15.59
SD 29	Barbara Cubin	1,760	58.80	Rod Robinder	1,233	41.20	—	—	—	—	—	—	2,993	527	17.61
SD 30	Charles K. Scott	1,626	100.00	—	—	—	—	—	—	—	—	—	1,626	1,626	100.00

=== Democratic primaries ===
Only three races saw more than one candidate stand in the Democratic primary. For the sake of brevity, races in which no candidates filed will not be shown.

District	Winners			Runners-up			Total
District	Candidate	Vote	%	Candidate	Vote	%	Total	Maj.	%
SD 2	Cisco Valdez	1,396	100.00	—	—	—	1,396	1,396	100.00
SD 4	Pat Hacker	2,187	100.00	—	—	—	2,187	2,187	100.00
SD 5	Liz Byrd	1,504	100.00	—	—	—	1,504	1,504	100.00
SD 6	Rich Cathcart	1,197	65.88	Carrol Orrison	620	34.12	1,817	577	31.76
SD 5	Guy Cameron	2,098	100.00	—	—	—	2,098	2,098	100.00
SD 8	James L. Applegate	1,878	100.00	—	—	—	1,878	1,878	100.00
SD 9	Lisa Kinney	1,569	100.00	—	—	—	1,569	1,569	100.00
SD 10	Pete Maxfield	1,200	100.00	—	—	—	1,200	1,200	100.00
SD 12	Frank Prevedel	2,489	100.00	—	—	—	2,489	2,489	100.00
SD 13	Carl Maldonado	2,119	100.00	—	—	—	2,119	2,119	100.00
SD 14	Mark O. Harris	1,448	100.00	—	—	—	1,448	1,448	100.00
SD 15	Greg Philips	1,033	75.79	Joe Loftin	330	24.21	1,363	703	51.58
SD 17	Mike Gierau	1,190	100.00	—	—	—	1,190	1,190	100.00
SD 20	Mike Hanify	1,089	100.00	—	—	—	1,089	1,089	100.00
SD 21	Don Finzer	1,270	100.00	—	—	—	1,270	1,270	100.00
SD 22	Peggy Sanders	1,065	100.00	—	—	—	1,065	1,065	100.00
SD 23	Sandy Daly	479	100.00	—	—	—	479	479	100.00
SD 25	John Vinich	1,992	100.00	—	—	—	1,992	1,992	100.00
SD 27	Robert Penney	1,441	100.00	—	—	—	1,441	1,441	100.00
SD 28	Keith Goodenough	1,326	76.38	P.J. Rose	410	23.62	1,736	916	52.76
SD 29	Barbara Reese	1,365	100.00	—	—	—	1,365	1,365	100.00
SD 30	Michael Rogers	1,319	100.00	—	—	—	1,319	1,319	100.00

Barbara Reese withdrew from the race after the Democratic primary.
