= 1994 Wyoming Senate election =

- November 8, 1994

18 of 30 seats in the Wyoming Senate Odd-numbered seats, 20, 22, and 28 up
| | Majority party | Minority party |
|---|---|---|
| Leader | Jerry B. Dixon (retiring) | Lisa Kinney (retiring) |
| Party | Republican | Democratic |
| Leader's seat | 1st district | 9th district |
| Seats before | 20 | 10 |
| Seats after | 20 | 10 |
| Seat change | Steady | Steady |
| Popular vote | 73,362 | 37,299 |
| Percentage | 65.56% | 33.33% |
Senate President before election
Jerry B. Dixon
Republican
Elected Senate President
Boyd L. Eddins
Republican

The 1994 Wyoming Senate election was held on November 8, 1994, to elect members to the Wyoming Senate for its 53rd session as part of the 1994 United States elections. Partisan primaries were held on August 16. All odd-numbered seats were up for election, as well as districts 20, 22, and 28. Both Republicans and Democrats flipped one seat.

The election was held concurrently with elections for the state house, U.S. Representative, U.S. Senate, and governor.

== Summary ==
| Party | Candidates | | | Seats |
| Party | Num. | Vote | % | Before | Up | Won | After | +/– |
|---|---|---|---|---|---|---|---|---|
| Republicans | 16 | 73,362 | 65.56% | 20 | 13 | 13 | 20 | Steady |
| Democrats | 11 | 37,299 | 33.33% | 10 | 5 | 5 | 10 | Steady |
| Libertarians | 2 | 1,245 | 1.11% | 0 | 0 | 0 | 0 | Steady |
| Totals | 29 | 111,906 | 100.00% | 30 | 18 | | 30 |

| District | Incumbent | | Elected | | Result | Notes |
| District | Party | Senator | Party | Senator | | Notes |
|---|---|---|---|---|---|---|
| SD 1 | Rep. | Jerry B. Dixon | Rep. | Bill Barton | Rep. hold. | Incumbent did not stand for re-election. |
| SD 3 | Rep. | Jim Geringer | Rep. | Curt Meier | Rep hold. | Incumbent elected governor. |
| SD 5 | Rep. | Cynthia Lummis | Rep. | Donald Lawler | Rep hold. | Incumbent did not stand for re-election. |
| SD 7 | Dem. | Guy Cameron | Dem. | Guy Cameron | Dem hold. |
| SD 9 | Dem. | Lisa Kinney | Rep. | Vincent Picard | Rep gain. | Incumbent did not stand for re-election. |
| SD 11 | Rep. | Bob Grieve | Rep. | Bob Grieve | Rep hold. |
| SD 13 | Dem. | Carl Maldonado | Dem. | Ray Sarcletti | Dem hold. | Incumbent did not stand for re-election. |
| SD 15 | Dem. | Gregory Phillips | Dem. | Gregory Phillips | Dem hold. |
| SD 17 | Rep. | Bob LaLonde | Rep. | Grant Larson | Rep hold. | Incumbent did not stand for re-election. |
| SD 19 | Rep. | Carroll Miller | Rep. | Carroll Miller | Rep hold. |
| SD 20* | Rep. | Gerald Geis | Rep. | Gerald Geis | Rep hold. | Incumbent appointed in 1993 after the resignation of John Rankine. |
| SD 21 | Rep. | Tom Kinnison | Rep. | Tom Kinnison | Rep hold. |
| SD 22* | Rep. | John Schiffer | Rep. | John Schiffer | Rep hold. | Incumbent appointed in 1993 after the resignation of Robert H. Trent. |
| SD 23 | Rep. | Larry Gilbertz | Rep. | Larry Gilbertz | Rep hold. |
| SD 25 | Dem. | John Vinich | Dem. | John Vinich | Dem hold. |
| SD 27 | Rep. | Gail Zimmerman | Rep. | Gail Zimmerman | Rep hold. |
| SD 28* | Rep. | Mary C. MacGuire | Dem. | Keith Goodenough | Dem gain. | Incumbent appointed in 1993 after the resignation of Susan Anderson and lost re-election. |
| SD 29 | Rep. | Barbara Cubin | Rep. | Bill Hawks | Rep hold. | Incumbent elected to the U.S. House. |

An asterisk (*) denotes an early election for an unexpired term.

== Detailed election results ==
=== General election ===
To ease sorting, races won by a Republican candidate have a positive margin, while races won by Democratic candidates have negative margins.

| District | Republicans | | | Democrats | | | Libertarians | | | Total |
| District | Candidate | Vote | % | Candidate | Vote | % | Candidate | Vote | % | Total | Maj. | % |
|---|---|---|---|---|---|---|---|---|---|---|---|---|
| SD 1 | Bill Barton | 4,996 | 71.72 | Bob Norlin | 1,970 | 28.28 | — | — | — | 6,966 | +3,026 | +43.44 |
| SD 3 | Curt Meier | 4,351 | 59.37 | Harold Bovee | 2,978 | 40.63 | — | — | — | 7,329 | +1,373 | +18.73 |
| SD 5 | Donald Lawler | 3,612 | 58.02 | Steve Freudenthal | 2,613 | 41.98 | — | — | — | 6,225 | +999 | +16.05 |
| SD 7 | Byron Hirst | 2,065 | 37.18 | Guy Cameron | 3,489 | 62.82 | — | — | — | 5,554 | -1,424 | -25.64 |
| SD 9 | Vincent Picard | 2,752 | 49.30 | Amber Travsky | 2,569 | 46.02 | Rod Heil | 261 | 4.68 | 5,582 | +183 | +3.28 |
| SD 11 | Bob Grieve | 5,447 | 100.00 | — | — | — | — | — | — | 5,447 | +5,447 | +100.00 |
| SD 13 | — | — | — | Ray Sarcletti | 4,956 | 100.00 | — | — | — | 4,956 | +4,956 | +100.00 |
| SD 15 | Herb Weston | 2,338 | 38.33 | Gregory Phillips | 3,762 | 61.67 | — | — | — | 6,100 | -1,424 | -23.34 |
| SD 17 | Grant Larson | 5,934 | 57.97 | Steve Thomas | 4,302 | 42.03 | — | — | — | 10,236 | +1,632 | +15.94 |
| SD 19 | Carroll Miller | 5,900 | 100.00 | — | — | — | — | — | — | 5,900 | +5,900 | +100.00 |
| SD 20* | Gerald Geis | 6,196 | 100.00 | — | — | — | — | — | — | 6,196 | +6,196 | +100.00 |
| SD 21 | Tom Kinnison | 5,238 | 100.00 | — | — | — | — | — | — | 5,238 | +5,238 | +100.00 |
| SD 22* | John Schiffer | 5,703 | 85.28 | — | — | — | Larry Gray | 984 | 14.72 | 6,687 | +4719 | +70.57 |
| SD 23 | Larry Gilbertz | 4,708 | 100.00 | — | — | — | — | — | — | 4,708 | +4,708 | +100.00 |
| SD 25 | — | — | — | John Vinich | 5,005 | 100.00 | — | — | — | 5,005 | -5,005 | -100.00 |
| SD 27 | Gail Zimmerman | 6,066 | 100.00 | — | — | — | — | — | — | 6,066 | +6,066 | +100.00 |
| SD 28* | Mary C. MacGuire | 3,272 | 49.47 | Keith Goodenough | 3342 | 50.53 | — | — | — | 6614 | -70 | -1.06 |
| SD 29 | Bill Hawks | 4784 | 67.41 | Worth Christie | 2313 | 32.59 | — | — | — | 7097 | +2471 | +34.82 |

An asterisk (*) denotes an early election for an unexpired term.

=== Republican primaries ===
For the sake of brevity, races in which no candidates filed will not be shown.

| District | Winners | | | Runners-up | | | | | | Total |
| District | Candidate | Vote | % | Candidate | Vote | % | Candidate | Vote | % | Total | Maj. | % |
|---|---|---|---|---|---|---|---|---|---|---|---|---|
| SD 1 | Bill Barton | 4,004 | 100.00 | — | — | — | — | — | — | 4,004 | 4,004 | 100.00 |
| SD 3 | Curt Meier | 3,498 | 100.00 | — | — | — | — | — | — | 3,498 | 3,498 | 100.00 |
| SD 5 | Donald Lawler | 1,322 | 55.41 | Ronald Pretty | 1,064 | 44.59 | — | — | — | 2,386 | 258 | 10.81 |
| SD 7 | Byron Hirst | 1,454 | 100.00 | — | — | — | — | — | — | 1,454 | 1,454 | 100.00 |
| SD 9 | Vincent Picard | 699 | 57.91 | Roger Brittom | 508 | 42.09 | — | — | — | 1,207 | 191 | 15.82 |
| SD 11 | Bob Grieve | 1,846 | 100.00 | — | — | — | — | — | — | 1,846 | 1,846 | 100.00 |
| SD 15 | Herb Weston | 1,389 | 100.00 | — | — | — | — | — | — | 1,389 | 1,389 | 100.00 |
| SD 17 | Grant Larson | 2,767 | 63.49 | Bob Morris | 8,28 | 19.00 | Maria Sue Gordon | 763 | 17.51 | 4,358 | 1,939 | 44.49 |
| SD 19 | Carroll Miller | 2,771 | 69.64 | Kent Bailey | 1,208 | 30.36 | — | — | — | 3979 | 1,563 | 39.28 |
| SD 20* | Gerald Geis | 4,359 | 100.00 | — | — | — | — | — | — | 4,359 | 4,359 | 100.00 |
| SD 21 | Tom Kinnison | 2,590 | 100.00 | — | — | — | — | — | — | 2,590 | 2,590 | 100.00 |
| SD 22* | John Schiffer | 3,705 | 100.00 | — | — | — | — | — | — | 3,705 | 3,705 | 100.00 |
| SD 23 | Larry Gilbertz | 3,131 | 100.00 | — | — | — | — | — | — | 3,131 | 3,131 | 100.00 |
| SD 27 | Gail Zimmerman | 2,356 | 76.44 | Phil McCauley | 726 | 23.56 | — | — | — | 3,082 | 1,630 | 52.89 |
| SD 28* | Mary C. MacGuire | 1,398 | 51.91 | Rick Bonander | 1,295 | 48.09 | — | — | — | 2,693 | 103 | 3.82 |
| SD 29 | Bill Hawks | 2,057 | 61.96 | Mike Hentrich | 1,263 | 38.04 | — | — | — | 3,320 | 794 | 23.92 |

An asterisk (*) denotes an early election for an unexpired term.

=== Democratic primaries ===
Only one race, District 9, saw more than one candidate stand in the Democratic primary. For the sake of brevity, races in which no candidates filed will not be shown.

| District | Winners | | | Runners-up | | | Total |
| District | Candidate | Vote | % | Candidate | Vote | % | Total | Maj. | % |
|---|---|---|---|---|---|---|---|---|---|
| SD 1 | Bob Norlin | 673 | 100.00 | — | — | — | 673 | 673 | 100.00 |
| SD 3 | Harold Bovee | 1,443 | 100.00 | — | — | — | 1,443 | 1,443 | 100.00 |
| SD 5 | Steve Freudenthal | 1,160 | 100.00 | — | — | — | 1,160 | 1,160 | 100.00 |
| SD 7 | Guy Cameron | 1,495 | 100.00 | — | — | — | 1,495 | 1,495 | 100.00 |
| SD 9 | Amber Travsky | 896 | 57.40 | Warren Lauer | 665 | 42.60 | 1,561 | 231 | 14.80 |
| SD 13 | Ray Sarcletti | 2,904 | 100.00 | — | — | — | 2,904 | 2,904 | 100.00 |
| SD 15 | Gregory Phillips | 2,208 | 100.00 | — | — | — | 2,208 | 2,208 | 100.00 |
| SD 17 | Steve Thomas | 1,095 | 100.00 | — | — | — | 1,095 | 1,095 | 100.00 |
| SD 25 | John Vinich | 1,612 | 100.00 | — | — | — | 1,612 | 1,612 | 100.00 |
| SD 28* | Keith Goodenough | 1,249 | 100.00 | — | — | — | 1,249 | 1,249 | 100.00 |
| SD 29 | Worth Christie | 1,142 | 100.00 | — | — | — | 1,142 | 1,142 | 100.00 |

An asterisk (*) denotes an early election for an unexpired term.
