= Bill Guffey =

American politician (born 1943)

Member of the Wyoming House of Representatives from the Laramie County district
- In office January 11, 1977 – January 9, 1979 Serving with Arthur L. Buck, Jack Crews, Ellen Crowley-Suyematsu, William C. Edwards, Gus Fleischli (1977–1978), Richard R. Larson (1978–1979), Bill McIlvain, Carrol Orrison, Elizabeth Phelan, Dean T. Prosser, Walter Urbigkit

Personal details
- Born: January 21, 1943 (age 83) Twin Falls, Idaho, U.S.
- Party: Democratic
- Spouse: Jan
- Children: 2
- Education: George Washington University
- Profession: Politician

Bill Guffey (born January 21, 1943) is an American politician from Cheyenne, Wyoming who served in the Wyoming House of Representatives from 1977 to 1979, representing Laramie County as a Democrat in the 44th Wyoming Legislature.

== Early life and education ==
Guffey was born in Twin Falls, Idaho, on January 21, 1943. He attended George Washington University.

== Career ==
In 1977, Guffey was elected to the Wyoming House of Representatives to represent Laramie County as a Democrat until 1979. (Note: According to the Wyoming Legislature, Guffey served from 1977 to 1978.) During his time in office, Guffey served on the standing committee of Corporations, Elections and Political Subdivisions.

Guffey also served on the Planning Committee on Criminal Administration, as well as the Governor's Planning Committee on Criminal Administration.

== Personal life ==
Guffey is married and has two children.

== Notes ==
Wyoming House of Representatives
| Preceded by — | Member of the Wyoming House of Representatives from the Laramie County district 1977–1979; Served alongside: Arthur L. Buck, Jack Crews, Ellen Crowley, William C. Edwards, Gus Fleischli (1977–1978), Richard R. Larson (1978–1979), Bill McIlvain, Carrol Orrison, Elizabeth Phelan, Dean T. Prosser, Walter Urbigkit | Succeeded by — |
