= 1990 Wyoming Senate election =

- November 6, 1990

15 of 30 seats in the Wyoming Senate
| | Majority party | Minority party |
|---|---|---|
| Leader | Russell Zimmer | John Vinich |
| Party | Republican | Democratic |
| Leader's seat | Goshen | Fremont |
| Seats before | 19 | 11 |
| Seats after | 20 | 10 |
| Seat change | ▲1 | ▼1 |
| Popular vote | 91,436 | 71,549 |
| Percentage | 56.10% | 43.90% |
- Republican gain Republican hold Democratic hold Best-performing candidate by county Republicans: 40–50% 50–60% 60–70% >90% Democrats: 30–40% 40–50% 50–60% 60–70%
Senate President before election
Russell Zimmer
Republican
Elected Senate President
Diemer True
Republican

The 1990 Wyoming Senate election was held on November 6, 1990, to elect 15 members of the Wyoming Senate. This was the last election held before Gorin v. Karpan struck down Wyoming's county-based legislative apportionment plan in favor of single-member districts in 1992.

== Summary ==
| Party | Candidates | | | Seats |
| Party | Num. | Vote | % | Before | Up | Won | After | +/– |
|---|---|---|---|---|---|---|---|---|
| Republicans | 14 | 91,436 | 56.10% | 19 | 9 | 10 | 20 | ▲1 |
| Democrats | 10 | 71,549 | 43.90% | 11 | 6 | 5 | 10 | ▼1 |
| Total | 24 | 162,985 | 100.00% | 30 | 15 | 15 | 30 |

| District | Seats | Incumbents | | Elected | | Result | Notes |
| District | Seats | Party | Senator | Party | Senator | | Notes |
|---|---|---|---|---|---|---|---|
| Albany | 1 of 2 | Rep. | Bob Burnett | Rep. | Terry Guice | Rep hold. | Incumbent did not stand for re-election. |
| Carbon | 1 of 1 | Rep. | Bob Grieve | Rep. | Bob Grieve | Rep hold. |
| Converse | 1 of 1 | Rep. | Jim Twiford | Rep. | Jim Twiford | Rep hold. |
| Crook–Weston | 1 of 1 | Rep. | Jerry Dixon | Rep. | Jerry Dixon | Rep hold. |
| Fremont | 1 of 2 | Dem. | John Vinich | Dem. | John Vinich | Dem hold. |
| Hot Springs–Washakie | 1 of 1 | Rep. | Mike Healy | Rep. | Mike Healy | Rep hold. |
| Laramie | 2 of 4 | Dem. | Guy Cameron | Dem. | Guy Cameron | Dem hold. |
| Laramie | 2 of 4 | Dem. | Win Hickey | Rep. | Gary Yordy | Rep gain. | Incumbent did not stand for re-election. |
| Lincoln | 1 of 1 | Rep. | Boyd L. Eddins | Rep. | Boyd L. Eddins | Rep hold. |
| Natrona | 2 of 4 | Rep. | Charles Scott | Rep. | Charles Scott | Rep hold. |
| Natrona | 2 of 4 | Rep. | Gail D. Zimmerman | Rep. | Gail D. Zimmerman | Rep hold. |
| Sheridan | 1 of 2 | Dem. | Della Herbst | Dem. | Della Herbst | Dem hold. |
| Sublette–Teton | 1 of 1 | Rep. | Bob LaLonde | Rep. | Bob LaLonde | Rep hold. |
| Sweetwater | 2 of 3 | Dem. | Frank Prevedel | Dem. | Frank Prevedel | Dem hold. |
| Sweetwater | 2 of 3 | Dem. | Robert Reese | Dem. | Robert Reese | Dem hold. |

== Detailed results ==
For the sake of brevity, races in which no candidates filed are excluded.

=== General election ===
To ease sorting, races won by a Republican candidate have a positive margin, while races won by Democratic candidates have negative margins.

==== Single-winner ====
| District | Republicans | | | Democrats | | | Total |
| District | Candidate | Vote | % | Candidate | Vote | % | Total | Maj. | % |
|---|---|---|---|---|---|---|---|---|---|
| Albany | Terry Guice | 4,680 | 50.61 | Amber Travsky | 4,568 | 49.39 | 9,248 | +112 | +1.21 |
| Carbon | Bob Grieve | 3,762 | 63.35 | Tom McGuire | 2,176 | 36.65 | 5,938 | +1,586 | +26.71 |
| Converse | Jim Twiford | 3,241 | 100.00 | — | — | — | 3,241 | +3,241 | +100.00 |
| Crook–Weston | Jerry Dixon | 4,101 | 100.00 | — | — | — | 4,101 | +4,101 | +100.00 |
| Fremont | Sky Phifer | 5,091 | 44.25 | John Vinich | 6,415 | 55.75 | 11,506 | -1,324 | -11.51 |
| Hot Springs–Washakie | Mike Healy | 4,312 | 100.00 | — | — | — | 4,312 | +4,312 | +100.00 |
| Lincoln | Boyd Eddins | 3,872 | 100.00 | — | — | — | 3,872 | +3,872 | +100.00 |
| Sheridan | George A. Meredith | 3,717 | 39.30 | Della Herbst | 5,740 | 60.70 | 9,457 | -2,023 | -21.39 |
| Sublette–Teton | Bob LaLonde | 3,983 | 50.97 | H.L. Jensen | 3,832 | 49.03 | 7,815 | +151 | +1.93 |

==== Multi-winner ====
| District | Republicans | | | Democrats | | | Total |
| District | Candidate | Vote | % | Candidate | Vote | % | Total |
|---|---|---|---|---|---|---|---|
| Laramie | Gary Yordy | 12,958 | 29.20 | Guy Cameron | 15,175 | 34.20 | 44,370 |
| Laramie | Derrell Norman | 7,635 | 17.21 | Pamela Taylor | 8,602 | 19.39 | 44,370 |
| Natrona | Charles Scott | 15,510 | 40.72 | Barbara Reese | 9,254 | 24.30 | 38,090 |
| Natrona | Gail D. Zimmerman | 13,326 | 34.99 | — | — | — | 38,090 |
| Sweetwater | Bill Taliaferro | 5,248 | 24.95 | Frank Prevedel | 8,611 | 40.94 | 21,035 |
| Sweetwater | — | — | — | Robert Reese | 7,176 | 34.11 | 21,035 |

=== Republican primary elections ===
==== Single-winner ====
| District | Winners |
| District | Candidate | Vote |
|---|---|---|
| Albany | Terry Guice | 2,636 |
| Carbon | Bob Grieve | 1,811 |
| Converse | Jim Twiford | 2,429 |
| Fremont | Sky Phifer | 372 |
| Lincoln | Boyd L. Eddins | 2,711 |
| Sheridan | George Meredith | 3,397 |
| Hot Springs–Washakie | Mike Healy | 3,235 |
| Sublette–Teton | Bob LaLonde | 3,669 |
| Crook–Weston | Jerry Dixon | 3,148 |

==== Multi-winner ====
| District | Winners | | | | | | Total |
| District | Candidate | Vote | % | Candidate | Vote | % | Total |
|---|---|---|---|---|---|---|---|
| Laramie | Gary Yordy | 6,897 | 58.85 | Derrell Norman | 4,823 | 41.15 | 11,720 |
| Natrona | Gail Zimmerman | 7,839 | 51.35 | Charles Scott | 7,428 | 48.65 | 15,267 |

=== Democratic primary elections ===
==== Single-winner ====
| District | Winners | | | Runners-up | | | Total |
| District | Candidate | Vote | % | Candidate | Vote | % | Total | Maj. | % |
|---|---|---|---|---|---|---|---|---|---|
| Albany | Amber Travsky | 1,737 | 58.86 | Marguerite Nelson | 1,214 | 41.14 | 2,951 | +523 | +17.72 |
| Carbon | Tom McGuire | 1,888 | 100.00 | — | — | — | 1,888 | +1,888 | +100.00 |
| Fremont | John Vinich | 3,982 | 100.00 | — | — | — | 3,982 | +3,982 | +100.00 |
| Sheridan | Della Herbst | 1,853 | 100.00 | — | — | — | 1,853 | +1,853 | +100.00 |
| Sublette–Teton | H. L. Jensen | 1,048 | 100.00 | — | — | — | 1,048 | +1,048 | +100.00 |

==== Multi-winner ====
| District | Winners | | | | | | Runners-up | | | Total |
| District | Candidate | Vote | % | Candidate | Vote | % | Candidate | Vote | % | Total |
|---|---|---|---|---|---|---|---|---|---|---|
| Laramie | Guy Cameron | 6,407 | 51.34 | Pamela Taylor | 3,408 | 27.31 | E. Eugene Morris | 2,665 | 21.35 | 12,480 |
| Natrona | Barbara Reese | 4,690 | 100.00 | — | — | — | — | — | — | 4,690 |
| Sweetwater | Frank Prevedel | 6,201 | 53.94 | Robert J. Reese | 5,296 | 46.06 | — | — | — | 11,497 |
