= 1988 Wyoming Senate election =

- November 8, 1988

15 out of 30 seats in the Wyoming Senate 16 seats needed for a majority

	Majority party	Minority party
Leader	John F. Turner	Win Hickey
Party	Republican	Democratic
Leader's seat	Sublette–Teton	Laramie
Last election	19	11
Seats after	19	11
Seat change	Steady	Steady
Popular vote	98,442	92,772
Percentage	51.48%	48.52%
President before election
John F. Turner
Republican
Elected President
Russell Zimmer
Republican

The 1988 Wyoming Senate election was held on November 8, 1988, to determine which party would control the Wyoming Senate for the following two years in the 50th Wyoming State Legislature. Fifteen of the 30 seats in the Wyoming Senate were up for election. Prior to the election, 19 seats were held by Republicans and 11 seats were held by Democrats. The general election saw neither party gain nor lose any seats, thereby meaning that Republicans retained their majority in the State Senate.

== Retirements ==
=== Democrats ===
1. Big Horn: Frank T. Hinckley retired.
2. Sweetwater: John R. Schmidt retired.

=== Republicans ===
1. Laramie: Richard R. Larson retired.
2. Park: Robert W. Frisby retired.
3. Platte: Donald R. Cundall retired.
4. Sheridan: Carleton F. Perry retired.

== Incumbents defeated ==
=== In primary ===
==== Democrats ====
1. Laramie: Alvin Wiederspahn lost renomination to James L. Applegate and Liz Byrd.

== Closest races ==
Seats where the margin of victory was under 10%:

1. Sheridan, 4.54%

== Results ==
=== Albany ===
Albany election, 1988
Party	Candidate	Votes	%
Democratic	Lisa Kinney (incumbent)	7,239	63.07%
Republican	Ted Gertsch	4,238	36.93%
Total votes		11,477	100.0%
Democratic hold			

=== Big Horn ===
Big Horn election, 1988
Party	Candidate	Votes	%
Republican	Allan Howard	2,632	57.38%
Democratic	Francis Hecker	1,955	42.62%
Total votes		4,587	100.0%
Republican gain from Democratic			

=== Campbell–Johnson ===
Campbell–Johnson election, 1988
Party	Candidate	Votes	%
Republican	John Perry (incumbent)	8,873	39.69%
Republican	Kelly Mader (incumbent)	7,079	31.67%
Democratic	Lawrence J. Hunter	3,277	14.66%
Democratic	Ruth Slater	3,124	13.98%
Total votes		22,353	100.0%
Republican hold			
Republican hold			

=== Fremont ===
Fremont election, 1988
Party	Candidate	Votes	%
Democratic	Frank Dusl (incumbent)	8,341	100.0%
Total votes		8,341	100.0%
Democratic hold			

=== Goshen–Niobrara ===
Goshen–Niobrara election, 1988
Party	Candidate	Votes	%
Republican	Russell W. Zimmer	3,724	58.29%
Democratic	Anne Gardetto	2,665	41.71%
Total votes		6,389	100.0%
Republican hold			

=== Laramie ===
Laramie election, 1988
Party	Candidate	Votes	%
Democratic	Liz Byrd	15,122	28.69%
Democratic	James L. Applegate	13,878	26.33%
Republican	John Clay	12,881	24.44%
Republican	Richard M. Baker	10,821	20.53%
Total votes		52,702	100.0%
Democratic gain from Republican			
Democratic hold			

=== Natrona ===
Natrona election, 1988
Party	Candidate	Votes	%
Republican	Dan Sullivan (incumbent)	16,339	35.88%
Republican	Diemer True (incumbent)	15,904	34.92%
Democratic	Linda Burkhart	7,642	16.78%
Democratic	Lowell Stephens	5,657	12.42%
Total votes		52,702	100.0%
Republican hold			
Republican hold			

=== Park ===
Park election, 1988
Party	Candidate	Votes	%
Republican	Hank Coe	6,244	64.34%
Democratic	Felix Bessler	3,460	35.66%
Total votes		9,704	100.0%
Republican hold			

=== Platte ===
Platte election, 1988
Party	Candidate	Votes	%
Republican	Jim Geringer	2,614	65.48%
Democratic	A. Edward Kendig	1,378	34.52%
Total votes		3,992	100.0%
Republican hold			

=== Sheridan ===
Sheridan election, 1988
Party	Candidate	Votes	%
Republican	Tom Kinnison	5,557	52.29%
Democratic	James Bankes	5,070	47.71%
Total votes		10,627	100.0%
Republican hold			

=== Sweetwater ===
Sweetwater election, 1988
Party	Candidate	Votes	%
Democratic	Carl Maldonado	9,756	100.0%
Total votes		9,756	100.0%
Democratic hold			

=== Uinta ===
Uinta election, 1988
Party	Candidate	Votes	%
Democratic	John Fanos (incumbent)	4,208	73.26%
Republican	Ken Near	1,536	26.74%
Total votes		5,744	100.0%
Democratic hold			
