= Orrison =

Orrison is a surname. Notable people with the surname include:

- Bob Orrison (1928–2011), American film and television stunt performer
- Carrol Orrison (born 1929), American politician
- Katherine Orrison (born 1948), American set decorator, producer, costumer, and author

== See also ==
- Orison (disambiguation)
