= Senator Jennings =

Senator Jennings may refer to:

- David V. Jennings (1887–1970), Wisconsin State Senate
- David Jennings (congressman) (1787–1834), Ohio State Senate
- J. B. Jennings (born 1974), Maryland State Senate
- Kit Jennings (born 1952), Wyoming State Senate
- Timothy Jennings (born 1950), New Mexico State Senate
- Toni Jennings (born 1949), Florida State Senate
