= Senator Zimmer =

Senator Zimmer may refer to:

- Dick Zimmer (born 1944), New Jersey State Senate
- Mike Zimmer (politician) (born 1963/64), Iowa State Senate
- Russell Zimmer (1926–2024), Wyoming State Senate
