= Dan Zwonitzer =

American politician

Member of the Wyoming House of Representatives from the 43rd district
- In office 2005 – January 2025
- Preceded by: Edward Prosser
- Succeeded by: Ann Lucas

Personal details
- Born: October 30, 1979 (age 47) Cheyenne, Wyoming, U.S.
- Party: Republican
- Education: Georgetown University

Dan Zwonitzer (born October 30, 1979) is an American politician who served as a Republican Party member of the Wyoming House of Representatives from District 43, which comprises south-central Laramie County and includes southeastern portion of the capital city of Cheyenne.

Zwonitzer is a Rockefeller Republican, known for his support for gay rights in a traditionally conservative state. He is the longest serving legislator in Laramie County, and was third in seniority in the Wyoming House. He served as chairman of the House Revenue Committee, after four years as chairman of House Corporations, Elections, and Political Subdivisions.

He was defeated in his attempt at re-election in the 2024 Republican primary.

== Personal life ==
Zwonitzer is a native and fifth-generation resident of Cheyenne.

He graduated from Cheyenne East High School and attended Georgetown University in Washington, D.C., receiving degrees in Government and Classical History. He returned to Cheyenne after college and has worked for the Wyoming Department of Agriculture and as a natural resources policy analyst in the office of Democratic governor Dave Freudenthal. He is a third-generation auctioneer in Cheyenne as well as a full-time instructor at Laramie County Community College. He has two children, Ezekiel and Nick.

As of 2019, Zwonitzer openly identifies himself as gay, and lists his spouse, Justin, on his official state legislative biography page.

== Wyoming Legislature ==
Zwonitzer was elected to the state House in 2004 after incumbent Edward R. Prosser lost the party nomination in the Republican primary. He then polled 60 percent of the general election vote.

Prosser, the son of the late representative Dean T. Prosser, was unsuccessful in unseating Zwonitzer in the 2006 primary.

Zwonitzer was reelected in 2008 by a 2–1 margin over Democratic challenger Kevin Lumsden. He faced no challenger in 2010, 2012, or 2018. In 2016, he defeated Bill Henderson who subsequently moved and won the House District 41 legislative seat in 2018.

Since Zwonitzer's first election, no other candidate has been able to defeat an incumbent Wyoming state representative as a primary challenger. Upon election, Zwonitzer became the youngest serving Wyoming legislator since former Wyoming state treasurer and fellow Republican Cynthia Lummis was elected to the Wyoming House in 1978. Zwonitzer is now the senior elected official in Laramie County having served for eight terms and is 2nd in seniority out of the 60 member Wyoming House of Representatives.

Dan and his father, David Zwonitzer, were the first father-and-son team in Wyoming history to simultaneously serve in the state legislature. David Zwonitzer was appointed to the legislature to represent District 9 (northeastern Cheyenne) in May 2006 after the previous representative moved to another district. He was thereafter elected to his first of five full terms. They served together for 10 years until his father's retirement from the legislature in 2016.

Zwonitzer was defeated in his attempt at re-election in the 2024 Republican primary.

== Committees ==
Zwonitzer served as Chairman of the Revenue Committee, previously serving as Chairman of Corporations, Elections & Political Subdivisions Committee, Vice-Chairman of Agriculture, Public Lands & Water Resources Committee, State Building Commission Liaison, State Workforce Investment Board, and is the Wyoming delegate for the NCSL - Communications, Financial Services and Interstate Commerce.

== Equality ==
Dan Zwonitzer, who is openly gay, was hailed by gay rights activists nationwide when, on February 22, 2007, he spoke against a bill that would have Wyoming prohibited from recognizing same-sex marriages performed in other jurisdictions. Zwonitzer testified to the House Rules Committee that his opposition – even if it cost him his seat – was the right thing to do, that gay rights were the civil rights struggle of his generation. "I will tell my children that when this debate went on, I stood up for basic rights for people," he said.

Committee member Tom Lubnau, a Republican from Gillette, sided with Zwonitzer. "Maybe the right thing to do is stand up for tolerance," Lubnau said. The committee voted 7–6 to kill the bill, with Republican Speaker Roy Cohee of Casper casting the tie-breaking vote.

Zwonitzer later discussed his speech on a radio program hosted by Joe Solmonese, president of the Human Rights Campaign and was picked up quickly by several bloggers, including Michael Petrelis, who posted the entire text of Zwonitzer's speech to the House Rules Committee on his blog.

On May 6, 2007, Zwonitzer was awarded the "Uncommon Courage Award" by the Log Cabin Republicans, an organization lobbying for gays within the Republican Party, at its annual national convention in Denver. The award, which applauds Republican elected officials for displaying "leadership in fighting for basic fairness for gay and lesbian families," was also presented to Michigan state representative Lorence Wenke and New York Assemblywoman Teresa Sayward.
