= Richard Larson =

Richard Larson may refer to:

- Richard Larson (academic) (born 1943), American professor of operations research
- Richard R. Larson (Wyoming politician) (1928–2016), American politician in the state of Wyoming
- Richard R. Larson (Illinois politician) (1907–1985), American politician in the state of Illinois

== See also ==
- Richard Larsen (disambiguation)
