= Lauren Schoenfeld =

American politician

Member-elect of the Wyoming Senate from the 5th district
- Assuming office January 2027
- Succeeding: Lynn Hutchings

Personal details
- Party: Republican

Lauren Schoenfeld is an American politician. A member of the Republican Party, she is the member-elect for the 5th district of the Wyoming Senate.
