= Jessica Crowder =

American politician

Member-elect of the Wyoming House of Representatives from the 43rd district
- Assuming office January 2027
- Succeeding: Ann Lucas

Personal details
- Party: Republican

Jessica Crowder is an American politician. A member of the Republican Party, she is the member-elect for the 43rd district of the Wyoming House of Representatives.
