= Wyoming's 20th State Senate district =

American legislative district

- Wyoming's 20th State Senate district as of 2022
Senator
Ed Cooper; R–Ten Sleep
- Demographics: 86% White; 9% Hispanic; 1% Native American; 3% Multiracial
- Population (2022): 18,011

Wyoming's 20th State Senate district is one of 31 districts in the Wyoming Senate. The district encompasses Hot Springs and Washakie counties as well as parts of Big Horn, Fremont and Park counties. It is represented by Republican Senator Ed Cooper of Ten Sleep.

In 1992, the state of Wyoming switched from electing state legislators by county to a district-based system.

== List of members representing the district ==
Representative	Party	Term	Note
John Rankine	Republican	1993	Elected in 1992. Resigned in 1993.
Gerald Geis	Republican	1993 – 2017	Appointed in 1993. Elected in 1994. Re-elected in 1996. Re-elected in 2000. Re-elected in 2004. Re-elected in 2008. Re-elected in 2012.
Wyatt Agar	Republican	2017 – 2021	Elected in 2016.
Ed Cooper	Republican	2021 – present	Elected in 2020. Re-elected in 2024.

== Recent election results ==
=== 2008 ===
Senate district 20 general election
Party	Candidate	Votes	%
Republican	Gerald Geis (incumbent)	7,057	98.67%
Write-ins		95	1.32%
Total votes		7,152	100.0%
Invalid or blank votes		995	
Republican hold			

=== 2012 ===
Senate district 20 general election
Party	Candidate	Votes	%
Republican	Gerald Geis (incumbent)	7,592	98.57%
Write-ins		110	1.42%
Total votes		7,702	100.0%
Invalid or blank votes		1,113	
Republican hold			

=== 2016 ===
Senate district 20 general election
Party	Candidate	Votes	%
Republican	Wyatt Agar	6,893	81.39%
Democratic	Mary Jane Norskog	1,546	18.25%
Write-ins		30	0.35%
Total votes		8,469	100.0%
Invalid or blank votes		325	
Republican hold			

=== 2020 ===
Senate district 20 general election
Party	Candidate	Votes	%
Republican	Ed Cooper	7,497	85.03%
Democratic	Theresa Livingston	1,293	14.66%
Write-ins		26	0.29%
Total votes		8,816	100.0%
Invalid or blank votes		275	
Republican hold			

=== 2024 ===
Senate district 20 general election
Party	Candidate	Votes	%
Republican	Ed Cooper (incumbent)	8,236	97.16%
Write-ins		240	2.83%
Total votes		8,476	100.0%
Invalid or blank votes		1,119	
Republican hold			

== Historical district boundaries ==
Map	Description	Apportionment Plan	Notes
	Hot Springs County; Washakie County; Big Horn County (part)	1992 Apportionment Plan	
	Hot Springs County; Washakie County; Big Horn County (part); Park County (part)	2002 Apportionment Plan	
	Hot Springs County; Washakie County; Big Horn County (part); Fremont County (part); Park County (part)	2012 Apportionment Plan	
