= Susan Anderson (politician) =

American politician (1945–2025)

Member of the Wyoming Senate from the 28th district
- In office 1993
- Preceded by: Constituency established
- Succeeded by: Mary C. MacGuire

Member of the Wyoming House of Representatives from the Natrona County district
- In office 1991–1992

Personal details
- Born: October 22, 1945 Pittsburgh, Pennsylvania
- Died: November 10, 2025 (aged 80)
- Party: Republican

Susan Carol Anderson (October 22, 1945 – November 10, 2025) was an American Republican politician from Natrona County, Wyoming.

Anderson was born in Pittsburgh, Pennsylvania on October 22, 1945.

She represented Natrona County in the Wyoming House of Representatives from 1991 to 1992 and represented the 28th district in the Wyoming Senate from 1993 to her resignation later that year.

She died of ovarian cancer on November 10, 2025.
