= Senator Trent =

Senator Trent may refer to:

- Curtis Trent (born 1983), Missouri State Senate
- Robert H. Trent (1936–2012), Wyoming State Senate

== See also ==
- Trent Lott (born 1941), U.S. Senator from Mississippi from 1989 to 2007
