= Wyoming's 22nd State Senate district =

American legislative district

- Wyoming's 22nd State Senate district as of 2022
Senator
Barry Crago; R–Buffalo
- Demographics: 89% White; 5% Hispanic; 2% Asian; 2% Native American; 2% Multiracial
- Population (2022): 20,232

Wyoming's 22nd State Senate district is one of 31 districts in the Wyoming Senate. The district encompasses Johnson County as well as part of Sheridan County. It is represented by Republican Senator Barry Crago of Buffalo.

In 1992, the state of Wyoming switched from electing state legislators by county to a district-based system.

== List of members representing the district ==
Representative	Party	Term	Note
Robert H. Trent	Republican	1993	Elected in 1992. Resigned in 1993.
John Schiffer	Republican	1993 – 2014	Appointed in 1993. Elected in 1994. Re-elected in 1996. Re-elected in 2000. Re-elected in 2004. Re-elected in 2008. Re-elected in 2012. Died in 2014.
Dave Kinskey	Republican	2014 – 2025	Appointed in 2014. Elected in 2016. Re-elected in 2020.
Barry Crago	Republican	2025 – present	Elected in 2024.

== Recent election results ==
=== 2008 ===
Senate district 22 general election
Party	Candidate	Votes	%
Republican	John Schiffer (incumbent)	8,322	98.54%
Write-ins		123	1.45%
Total votes		8,445	100.0%
Invalid or blank votes		1,410	
Republican hold			

=== 2012 ===
Senate district 22 general election
Party	Candidate	Votes	%
Republican	John Schiffer (incumbent)	7,658	98.00%
Write-ins		156	1.99%
Total votes		7,814	100.0%
Invalid or blank votes		1,161	
Republican hold			

=== 2016 ===
Senate district 22 general election
Party	Candidate	Votes	%
Republican	Dave Kinskey	7,603	96.85%
Write-ins		247	3.14%
Total votes		7,850	100.0%
Invalid or blank votes		1,344	
Republican hold			

=== 2020 ===
Senate district 22 general election
Party	Candidate	Votes	%
Republican	Dave Kinskey (incumbent)	8,516	97.34%
Write-ins		232	2.65%
Total votes		8,748	100.0%
Invalid or blank votes		1,493	
Republican hold			

=== 2024 ===
Senate district 22 general election
Party	Candidate	Votes	%
Republican	Barry Crago	8,599	93.94%
Write-ins		554	6.05%
Total votes		9,153	100.0%
Invalid or blank votes		1,485	
Republican hold			

== Historical district boundaries ==
Map	Description	Apportionment Plan	Notes
	Johnson County; Sheridan County (part)	1992 Apportionment Plan	
	Johnson County; Sheridan County (part)	2002 Apportionment Plan	
	Johnson County; Sheridan County (part)	2012 Apportionment Plan	
