= Wyoming's 25th State Senate district =

American legislative district

- Wyoming's 25th State Senate district as of 2022
Senator
Cale Case; R–Lander
- Demographics: 59% White; 1% Black; 7% Hispanic; 31% Native American; 3% Multiracial
- Population (2022): 19,174

Wyoming's 25th State Senate district is one of 31 districts in the Wyoming Senate. The district encompasses part of Fremont County. It is represented by Republican Senator Cale Case of Lander.

In 1992, the state of Wyoming switched from electing state legislators by county to a district-based system.

== List of members representing the district ==
Representative	Party	Term	Note
John Vinich	Democratic	1993 – 1999	Elected in 1992. Re-elected in 1994.
Cale Case	Republican	1999 – present	Elected in 1998. Re-elected in 2002. Re-elected in 2006. Re-elected in 2010. Re-elected in 2014. Re-elected in 2018. Re-elected in 2022.

== Recent election results ==
=== 2006 ===
Senate district 25 general election
Party	Candidate	Votes	%
Republican	Cale Case (incumbent)	3,849	60.95%
Democratic	Travis C. Brockie	2,466	39.04%
Total votes		6,315	100.0%
Republican hold			

=== 2010 ===
Senate district 25 general election
Party	Candidate	Votes	%
Republican	Cale Case (incumbent)	3,400	58.32%
Democratic	Clarence V. Thomas	2,408	41.31%
Write-ins		21	0.36%
Total votes		5,829	100.0%
Invalid or blank votes		355	
Republican hold			

=== 2014 ===
Senate district 25 general election
Party	Candidate	Votes	%
Republican	Cale Case (incumbent)	3,390	58.90%
Democratic	Sergio A. Maldonado Sr.	2,330	40.48%
Write-ins		35	0.60%
Total votes		5,755	100.0%
Invalid or blank votes		304	
Republican hold			

=== 2018 ===
Senate district 25 general election
Party	Candidate	Votes	%
Republican	Cale Case (incumbent)	4,012	58.08%
Democratic	Sergio A. Maldonado Sr.	2,872	41.58%
Write-ins		23	0.33%
Total votes		6,907	100.0%
Invalid or blank votes		278	
Republican hold			

=== 2022 ===
Senate district 25 general election
Party	Candidate	Votes	%
Republican	Cale Case (incumbent)	4,365	89.00%
Write-ins		539	10.99%
Total votes		4,904	100.0%
Invalid or blank votes		1,551	
Republican hold			

== Historical district boundaries ==
Map	Description	Apportionment Plan	Notes
	Fremont County (part)	1992 Apportionment Plan	
	Fremont County (part)	2002 Apportionment Plan	
	Fremont County (part)	2012 Apportionment Plan	
