= Barry Crago =

American politician

Member of the Wyoming Senate from the 22nd district
- Incumbent
- Assumed office January 6, 2025
- Preceded by: Dave Kinskey

Member of the Wyoming House of Representatives from the 40th district
- In office January 12, 2021 – January 2025
- Preceded by: Richard Tass
- Succeeded by: Marilyn Connolly

Personal details
- Party: Republican

Barry Crago is an American attorney, rancher, and politician serving as a Republican member of the Wyoming Senate, representing District 22 since 2025. He previously served as a member of the Wyoming House of Representatives for District 40 from 2021 to 2024.

== Career ==
Crago served as Civil Deputy County Attorney for Johnson County from 2008 to 2011, and then regained the position in 2013, an office he has held ever since. In 2017, Crago received the Wyoming State Bar's Community Service Award. On August 18, 2020, Crago defeated incumbent Richard Tass in the Republican primary for District 40, and won an uncontested race on November 3, 2020. On January 4, 2021, Crago was sworn into this position, and was re-elected to a second term in 2022.

In 2024, Crago was elected to represent the 22nd district in the Wyoming State Senate.

== Electoral history ==
=== 2020 ===
Wyoming's 40th House of Representatives district elections, 2020
Primary election
Party	Candidate	Votes	%
Republican	Barry Crago	1,677	57.9%
Republican	Richard Tass	1,154	39.8%
n/a	Under Votes	60	2.1%
Write-in		4	0.1%
n/a	Over Votes	2	0.1%
Total votes		2,897	100.0%
General election
Republican	Barry Crago	4,489	86.6%
n/a	Under Votes	611	11.8%
Write-in		85	1.6%
Total votes		5,185	100.0%

=== 2022 ===
Wyoming's 40th House of Representatives district elections, 2022
Primary election
Party	Candidate	Votes	%
Republican	Barry Crago	2,631	57.6%
Republican	Richard Tass	1,721	37.7%
n/a	Under Votes	189	4.1%
Write-in		20	0.4%
n/a	Over Votes	3	0.1%
Total votes		4,564	100.0%
General election
Republican	Barry Crago	4,007	86.6%
n/a	Under Votes	560	11.8%
Write-in		151	1.6%
Total votes		4,718	100.0%

=== 2024 ===
Wyoming's 22nd State Senate district elections, 2024
Primary election
Party	Candidate	Votes	%
Republican	Barry Crago	3,107	54.1%
Republican	Mark Jennings	2,500	43.6%
n/a	Under Votes	113	2.0%
Write-in		17	0.3%
n/a	Over Votes	1	nil
Total votes		5,738	100.0%
General election
Republican	Barry Crago	8,599	80.8%
n/a	Under Votes	1,481	13.9%
Write-in		554	5.2%
n/a	Over Votes	4	nil
Total votes		10,638	100.0%
