= Wyoming's 28th State Senate district =

American legislative district

- Wyoming's 28th State Senate district as of 2022
Senator
| James Lee Anderson; R–Casper |
- Demographics: 83% White; 11% Hispanic; 1% Asian; 3% Native American; 3% Multiracial
- Population (2022): 18,225

Wyoming's 28th State Senate district is one of 31 districts in the Wyoming Senate. The district encompasses part of Natrona County. It is represented by Republican Senator James Lee Anderson of Casper.

In 1992, the state of Wyoming switched from electing state legislators by county to a district-based system.

== List of members representing the district ==
| Representative | Party | Term | Note |
|---|---|---|---|
| Susan Anderson | Republican | 1993 | Elected in 1992. Resigned in 1993. |
| Mary C. MacGuire | Republican | 1993 – 1995 | Appointed in 1993. |
| Keith Goodenough | Democratic | 1995 – 2005 | Elected in 1994. Re-elected in 1996. Re-elected in 2000. |
| Kit Jennings | Republican | 2005 – 2013 | Elected in 2004. Re-elected in 2008. |
| James Lee Anderson | Republican | 2013 – present | Elected in 2012. Re-elected in 2016. Re-elected in 2020. Re-elected in 2024. |

== Recent election results ==
=== 2008 ===
Senate district 28 general election
| Party | Candidate | Votes | % |
|---|---|---|---|
| Republican | Kit Jennings (incumbent) | 4,219 | 58.63% |
| Democratic | Erich Frankland | 2,961 | 41.15% |
| Write-ins | | 15 | 0.20% |
| Total votes | | 7,195 | 100.0% |
| Invalid or blank votes | | 517 | |
| Republican hold | | | |

=== 2012 ===
Senate district 28 general election
| Party | Candidate | Votes | % |
|---|---|---|---|
| Republican | James Lee Anderson | 4,560 | 64.64% |
| Democratic | Kim Holloway | 2,463 | 34.91% |
| Write-ins | | 31 | 0.43% |
| Total votes | | 7,054 | 100.0% |
| Invalid or blank votes | | 482 | |
| Republican hold | | | |

=== 2016 ===
Senate district 28 general election
| Party | Candidate | Votes | % |
|---|---|---|---|
| Republican | James Lee Anderson (incumbent) | 5,216 | 70.97% |
| Democratic | Kimberly Holloway | 2,111 | 28.72% |
| Write-ins | | 22 | 0.29% |
| Total votes | | 7,349 | 100.0% |
| Invalid or blank votes | | 368 | |
| Republican hold | | | |

=== 2020 ===
Senate district 28 general election
| Party | Candidate | Votes | % |
|---|---|---|---|
| Republican | James Lee Anderson (incumbent) | 6,132 | 95.58% |
| Write-ins | | 283 | 4.41% |
| Total votes | | 6,415 | 100.0% |
| Invalid or blank votes | | 1,597 | |
| Republican hold | | | |

=== 2024 ===
Senate district 28 general election
| Party | Candidate | Votes | % |
|---|---|---|---|
| Republican | James Lee Anderson (incumbent) | 5,354 | 94.49% |
| Write-ins | | 312 | 5.50% |
| Total votes | | 5,666 | 100.0% |
| Invalid or blank votes | | 1,578 | |
| Republican hold | | | |

== Historical district boundaries ==
| Map | Description | Apportionment Plan | Notes |
|---|---|---|---|
| | Natrona County (part) | 1992 Apportionment Plan | |
| | Natrona County (part) | 2002 Apportionment Plan | |
| | Natrona County (part) | 2012 Apportionment Plan | |
