= Floyd Esquibel =

American politician (born 1938)

Member of the Wyoming Senate from the 8th district
- In office January 13, 2009 – January 10, 2017
- Preceded by: E. Jayne Mockler
- Succeeded by: Affie Ellis

Member of the Wyoming House of Representatives from the 44th district
- In office January 14, 1997 – January 13, 2009
- Preceded by: E. Jayne Mockler
- Succeeded by: James W. Byrd

Personal details
- Born: August 27, 1938 (age 88) Mora, New Mexico, U.S.
- Party: Democratic
- Spouse: Jacqueline
- Children: 3
- Education: University of Wyoming (BS); University of Denver (MSW); Sturm College of Law (JD)
- Profession: Attorney; Social worker

Floyd A. Esquibel (born August 27, 1938) is an American politician. He is a former Democratic member of the Wyoming Senate, representing the 8th district.

== Biography ==
Esquibel was born in Mora, New Mexico, and attended St Mary's High School. He earned a BS from the University of Wyoming in 1966, and a MSW from the University of Denver in 1972. In 1975 he earned a JD from the University of Denver. He was Supervisor in Social Work from 1989 to 1996, and from 1989 to 1992 he served as Compliance Officer for the State of Wyoming. Esquibel was Supervisor for the State of Nebraska in 1989, and Hearing Officer for the State of Wyoming from 1982 to 1986.

Esquibel was elected to the Wyoming House of Representatives, serving from 1997 through 2009. He served in the Wyoming Senate from 2009 until 2017, and was the Wyoming Senate Minority Caucus Chairman from 2011 to 2012.

Esquibel and his wife Jacqueline have three children, Stephanie Esquibel, Martin Esquibel and Jacqueline Esquibel. They have three grandchildren and reside in Cheyenne, Wyoming. Esquibel is the brother of Ken Esquibel, also a former state legislator in Wyoming. He is Hispanic.
