= Wyoming's 40th House of Representatives district =

American legislative district

Wyoming's 40th State House of Representatives district
- Wyoming's 40th House of Representatives district as of 2022
Representative
Marilyn Connolly; R–Buffalo
- Demographics: 92% White; 4% Hispanic; 1% Native American; 2% Multiracial
- Population (2022): 10,443

Wyoming's 40th House of Representatives district is one of 62 districts in the Wyoming House of Representatives. The district encompasses Johnson County and part of Sheridan County. It is represented by Republican Representative Marilyn Connolly of Buffalo.

In 1992, the state of Wyoming switched from electing state legislators by county to a district-based system.

== List of members representing the district ==
Representative	Party	Term	Note
John P. Marton	Republican	1993 – 1997	Elected in 1992. Re-elected in 1994.
Doug Osborn	Republican	1997 – 2007	Elected in 1996. Re-elected in 1998. Re-elected in 2000. Re-elected in 2002. Re-elected in 2004.
Mike Madden	Republican	2007 – 2019	Elected in 2006. Re-elected in 2008. Re-elected in 2010. Re-elected in 2012. Re-elected in 2014. Re-elected in 2016.
Richard Tass	Republican	2019 – 2021	Elected in 2018.
Barry Crago	Republican	2021 – 2025	Elected in 2020. Re-elected in 2022.
Marilyn Connolly	Republican	2025 – present	Elected in 2024.

== Recent election results ==
=== 2014 ===
House district 40 general election
Party	Candidate	Votes	%
Republican	Mike Madden (Incumbent)	2,827	97.14%
Write-ins		83	2.85%
Total votes		2,910	100.0%
Invalid or blank votes		586	
Republican hold			

=== 2016 ===
House district 40 general election
Party	Candidate	Votes	%
Republican	Mike Madden (Incumbent)	3,534	80.06%
Democratic	Greg Haas	834	18.89%
Write-ins		46	1.042%
Total votes		4,414	100.0%
Invalid or blank votes		274	
Republican hold			

=== 2018 ===
House district 40 general election
Party	Candidate	Votes	%
Republican	Richard Tass	2,355	60.13%
Independent	Chris Schock	1,552	39.63%
Write-ins		9	0.22%
Total votes		3,916	100.0%
Invalid or blank votes		198	
Republican hold			

=== 2020 ===
House district 40 general election
Party	Candidate	Votes	%
Republican	Barry Crago	4,489	98.14%
Write-ins		85	1.85%
Total votes		4,574	100.0%
Invalid or blank votes		611	
Republican hold			

=== 2022 ===
House district 40 general election
Party	Candidate	Votes	%
Republican	Barry Crago (Incumbent)	4,007	96.36%
Write-ins		151	3.63%
Total votes		4,158	100.0%
Invalid or blank votes		560	
Republican hold			

=== 2024 ===
House district 40 general election
Party	Candidate	Votes	%
Republican	Marilyn Connolly	4,806	95.03%
Write-ins		251	4.96%
Total votes		5,057	100.0%
Invalid or blank votes		805	
Republican hold			

== Historical district boundaries ==
Map	Description	Apportionment Plan	Notes
	Johnson County; Sheridan County (part)	1992 Apportionment Plan	
	Johnson County; Sheridan County (part)	2002 Apportionment Plan	
	Johnson County; Sheridan County (part)	2012 Apportionment Plan	
