= Keith Goodenough =

American politician

Member of the Wyoming Senate from the 28th district
- In office January 2, 1995 – January 3, 2005
- Preceded by: Mary MacGuire
- Succeeded by: Kit Jennings

Member of the Wyoming House of Representatives from the Natrona County district
- In office January 2, 1989 – January 4, 1993

Personal details
- Born: July 22, 1956 (age 70) Winsted, Connecticut, U.S.
- Party: Democratic (before 2012); Independent (2012–2016); Republican (2016–present)
- Education: Casper College; University of Montana (BS)

Keith B. Goodenough (born July 22, 1956) is an American politician who served as a member of the Casper, Wyoming, City Council from 2006 to 2014. He previously served as a Democrat in the Wyoming Senate from 1995 to 2005 and in the Wyoming House of Representatives from 1989 to 1993. In 2008, he ran for the U.S. Senate, but lost in the Democratic primary. Since then, he launched two unsuccessful campaigns for the Natrona County Commission as an independent candidate in 2012 and 2014.

== Background ==
Goodenough graduated from Kelly Walsh High School in Casper, Wyoming, in 1974. After graduation, he attended Casper College, and transferred to the University of Montana, where he graduated with a bachelor's degree in forestry in 1978. After graduating from college, he served in the Peace Corps in Guatemala, where he was stationed in San Juan Chamelco. Goodenough's service in Guatemala overlapped with the contentious 1982 presidential election, and Peace Corps volunteers were given the opportunity to leave the country prior to the election. After returning to Casper, he began working as a self-employed woodcutter and timber management specialist at Casper Mountain.

== Early campaigns ==
Shortly after returning from the Peace Corps, Goodenough announced that he would seek the Democratic Party's nomination to oppose incumbent Republican Congressman Dick Cheney in the 1984 election. He faced Laramie attorney Hugh McFadden in the Democratic primary. Goodenough raised very little money, and in announcing his campaign, said "he would finance the campaign by collecting and recycling aluminum cans." McFadden received support from the Wyoming Democratic Party, including some of its more prominent candidates, like former state senator Rodger McDaniel, the Democratic nominee in the 1982 U.S. Senate election. He was able to significantly outraise and outspend Goodenough. Ultimately, McFadden defeated Goodenough by a wide margin, and advanced to the general election, where lost handily to Cheney.

On July 22, 1985, Goodenough announced that he would run for Governor of Wyoming in the 1986 gubernatorial election. He barely met the age requirement, turning 30 several weeks before the primary in 1986. Goodenough was joined in the race by perennial candidate Al Hamburg, rancher Pat McGuire, and attorney Mike Sullivan.

Despite Sullivan's status as the frontrunner, however, Goodenough attracted attention for his campaign platform. He called for the decriminalization of marijuana, diversification of the economy, comprehensive sex education, banning employer drug testing, and raising speed limit to 75 miles per hour. He argued that American society was "schizophrenic" toward sex, as it was promoted and encouraged on television but children were not adequately educated about sex. Toward the end of the campaign, Goodenough unveiled an agricultural plan in which he called for the state to purchase foreclosed land and establish cooperatives for disadvantaged farmers, providing them with "alternative-type housing," like "packed earth and solar homes."

Goodenough also attracted media attention for the unusual nature of his campaign. At the beginning of the campaign, when his only opponent was Hamburg, he held a press conference and declared himself the frontrunner. Goodenough frequently announced his campaign proposals at informal press conferences where he drank beer while speaking. His messaging was similarly informal; he referred to Wyoming as a "Third World state," and announced that if he won the election, he would host a monthlong party at the governor's mansion. To generate publicity for his gubernatorial campaign, Goodenough placed classified ads reading: "Single male gubernatorial candidate would like to meet women (any size, shape, age, color, religion) who are interested in dancing or talking or politics."

But despite Goodenough's unorthodox campaign, he was overwhelmingly defeated by Sullivan, who won 71% of the vote to McGuire's 13%, Goodenough's 10%, and Hamburg's 6%. Sullivan would go on to win the general election by a wide margin.

== Wyoming House of Representatives ==
As Goodenough was losing the 1986 Democratic primary for Governor, he also received enough write-in votes to run as one of the Democratic nominees for the Wyoming House of Representatives in Natrona County. He accepted the nomination and continued his campaign as one of nine Democratic candidates for nine multimember seats in the state house. However, Republicans ended up winning all nine seats in the county.

Goodenough announced that he would run again for the state house in 1988. He argued for the creation of a Wyoming Conservation Corps to create jobs and to improve the quality of public lands. Goodenough was part of a concerted effort by the state party to claw back some of its legislative seats in Natrona County, and ultimately ended up narrowly winning one of the nine seats from the county—the only Democrat to do so.

During his first term in the legislature, Goodenough was outspoken. He spoke out against a proposal to make the state Superintendent of Public Instruction appointive, rather than elective, noting, "I think the idea of having a decentralized form of government is so if you get a total idiot as governor, he can't screw up the total system." He continued his push to relax drug laws, successfully killing a proposed piece of legislation that would have imposed harsher sentences for marijuana possession. In early 1990, Goodenough traveled to Guatemala, where he called the human rights situation "atrocious" and criticized the Wyoming National Guard for conducting training there.

Goodenough announced his re-election campaign in June 1990, arguing that he was a defender of liberty in the state legislature: "I vote against raising taxes. I vote against lowering taxes. I vote against anything that limits individual liberties, and for anything that will give people a vote or a say." Perhaps owing to his high profile as a freshman legislator, Goodenough was re-elected, once again as the only Democrat representing Natrona County—but this time, he placed second out of all the candidates running for the nine available seats.

In his second term, Goodenough continued his advocacy. He staked out a strong position against a proposed reorganization of state government, strongly opposed anti-abortion legislation, and was one of a few dissenting votes against drug-free school zones.

== Wyoming State Senate ==
Rather than seeking a third term in the state house, Goodenough instead announced that he would run for the Wyoming State Senate from the 28th District, which was located in central Casper. Goodenough beat political newcomer P.J. Rose in the Democratic primary by a wide margin and advanced to the general election, where he faced fellow State Representative Susan Anderson, who defeated incumbent state senator Michael Burke in the Republican primary. In the general election, Anderson attacked Goodenough for his opposition to tough-on-crime legislation, arguing that "he favor[ed] the rights of criminals over victims." In turn, Goodenough argued that he votes reflected his genuine opposition to the proposals on the merits—and argued that the Republican-dominated legislature sidelined minority voices like his. The Casper Star-Tribune endorsed Anderson over Goodenough, but noted that it was a "close call" and that they "fear losing Goodenough, because we feel his is a lone voice for the powerless, too valuable, and too rare, to be almost entirely gone from the Legislature as it will be if he is defeated." Ultimately, Anderson narrowly defeated Goodenough, winning 50.3% of the vote to his 49.7%, a margin of just 36 votes.

In 1994, Goodenough announced that he would run for the State Senate again. Just a year into her term, Anderson resigned from the Senate. She was replaced by the state party with Mary MacGuire, and a special election was triggered for 1994 for the remaining two years of Anderson's term. MacGuire ran for re-election, winning a contested Republican primary. Goodenough won the primary unopposed, advancing to the general election against MacGuire. He campaigned on his support for democratic reforms, like allowing recall of state officials and adding a "none of the above" option to state ballots, and criminal justice reform.

Just like the 1992 race, the 1994 election was close—the initial results showed Goodenough defeating MacGuire by just 69 votes. A contentious recount ensued; MacGuire was initially denied a recount by the Natrona County Attorney's office, but this decision was overridden by Wyoming Secretary of State Kathy Karpan. The recount ultimately affirmed Goodenough's victory, increasing his margin of victory to 72 votes. After the recount, MacGuire refused to concede, instead informing Goodenough that she intended to file a formal challenge with the Wyoming State Senate. She argued that enough illegal votes were cast to call the result of the question into doubt. Goodenough harshly criticized MacGuire's actions as "harmful to democracy" and argued that she was trying to steal the election. Shortly thereafter, however, MacGuire informed Goodenough that she was withdrawing her challenge, conceding that "the voters involved made honest mistakes."

Goodenough ran for re-election in 1996, and was opposed by oil executive Rick Bonander. Bonander praised Goodenough as "really good on the social issues," but argued that Goodenough was ineffective in the legislature. Goodenough defended his record in the legislature as protective of the U.S. and Wyoming constitutions. He and Bonander were joined in the race by write-in candidate Bruce Sell, a minister at a Baptist church. Ultimately, Goodenough won re-election by a fairly wide margin, winning 54% of the vote to Bonander's 43% and Sells's 3%.

== 1998 Wyoming gubernatorial election ==
In the leadup to the 1998 Wyoming gubernatorial election, Goodenough was frequently mentioned as a potential candidate to challenge incumbent Republican governor Jim Geringer, who was seeking a second term. In May 1998, Goodenough announced his campaign, and said that he "would focus on education finance, public lands, domestic violence, campaign finance reform, economic development and the Bill of Rights." He pledged to not accept PAC contributions or individual contributions over $100, and launched a statewide tour, in which he planned to drive around the state in his truck, distributing hand-painted campaign signs to voters. In the Democratic primary, Goodenough faced fellow State Senator John Vinich and University of Wyoming history professor Phil Roberts. Goodenough proclaimed himself a "populist," and attacked Vinich as a "creature of Big Money" because of his willingness to accept PAC contributions.

Despite Goodenough's unorthodox statewide profile, he lost the primary to Vinich by a wide margin, winning just 26% of the vote to Vinich's 54% and Robert's 20%, even falling short in Natrona County, which he represented in the legislature. In the general election, Vinich would ultimately lose by a wide margin to Geringer.

== Return to the Wyoming Senate ==
After losing the 1998 Democratic primary to Vinich, Goodenough continued his service in the Wyoming State Senate. He ran for re-election in 2000 and was opposed by Republican Tom Walsh, the mayor of Casper. Goodenough and Walsh reached a "gentlemen's agreement" to focus the race on the issues, as opposed to personal attacks, leading to a largely positive campaign. This agreement notwithstanding, however, one of the biggest controversies in the race occurred when local veterans expressed offense that Walsh had falsely presented himself as a veteran of the Vietnam War. Ultimately, Goodenough once again won a narrow victory, defeating Walsh by just 90 votes.

In 2004, Goodenough ran for re-election and faced a strong challenge from Republican Kit Jennings, a businessman who worked in the energy and construction industries. Both Goodenough and Jennings won their primaries unopposed and advanced to the general election. Despite the tough opposition he faced, Goodenough campaigned as a maverick and articulated some controversial opinions. The candidates took opposite positions on Amendment C, a tort-reform proposal put on the ballot by the legislature that aimed to allow the legislature to put caps on damages in medical malpractice lawsuits. Jennings strongly supported the Amendment and received support from the local medical community. But Goodenough argued that there was no evidence that frivolous lawsuits were occurring and that "[t]he rate increases for medical malpractice are driven by out-of-state factors"; he instead favored a self-insurance pool for doctors.

The candidates also strongly disagreed on social issues. Goodenough had long been a supporter of drug decriminalization efforts and opposed more punitive sentences for drug possession and use. In the legislature, Goodenough voted against legislation that would have increased criminal penalties for adults who possessed methamphetamine in the presence of children. He argued that "it targeted the wrong group of people; people who have custody of kinds are usually women." But Goodenough's opposition to the legislation proved controversial. One of the bill's co-sponsors, Republican state senator John Barrasso, wrote a letter urging Goodenough's defeat, arguing that "Keith Goodenough puts his concern for drug dealers over the concerns of Wyoming's children." In response, Goodenough challenged Barrasso to a debate on the issue, which Barrasso declined. Jennings and Goodenough also disagreed on the issue of physician-assisted suicide. In the 2004 legislative session, Goodenough introduced legislation that would have allowed adults to obtain medication to end their lives, which Jennings strongly opposed.

Otherwise, the candidates were largely in sync on the issues. Both candidates were in favor of gun rights and had received favorable ratings from the NRA Political Victory Fund, which endorsed Goodenough for re-election. Both also identified as fiscal conservatives and supported depositing the state's budget surplus in the state's Permanent Mineral Trust Fund as a "rainy day" fund.

Ultimately, Goodenough narrowly lost re-election to Jennings, receiving 49% of the vote to Jenning's 51%. However, Goodenough significantly outperformed Democratic presidential nominee John Kerry's performance in his district. Kerry lost Natrona County in a landslide and received less than 40% of the vote in the 28th District.

== Casper City Council ==
In 2006, Goodenough announced that he would run for a seat on the Casper City Council in Ward I, based in central and downtown Casper, challenging Mayor Renee Burgess for re-election. He also faced former Wall Street trader Keith Rolland and Terry Morris-Rittenour. He emphasized his support for domestic violence and child abuse prevention and said that he "would like to see a dedicated response unit to domestic violence, as well as have the city provide legal aid to victims in the form of divorce fees and help with child custody." Goodenough also argued for more aggressive oversight by the city council, noting that there was a lack of accountability on the council's part, and that adding an "iconoclast" like him "would increase the interest level" of the residents.

In the primary election, the Casper Star-Tribune endorsed Burgess and Rolland. It praised Burgess for her "experience" and "solid grasp of what issues matter most to Casper's future" and Rolland for his "passion and fearlessness," which it hoped "could kick-start some productive discussions about Casper's future." The Star-Tribune described Goodenough as an "honorable gadfly" during his tenure in the legislature, and argued that "his maverick style . . . might impede the nonpartisan, workaday business of hometown leadership."

Ultimately, in the August 22 primary election, Burgess and Goodenough won first and second place, advancing to the general election. Burgess won a narrow plurality, with 42% of the vote, while Goodenough won a narrow second place with 39% of the vote; Rolland won 13% and Rittenour won 6%.

In the general election, Goodenough and Burgess both agreed on the need to improve Casper's downtown area, but disagreed as to how to do so. Burgess argued that the city needed to encourage mixed-use development, while Goodenough argued for increasing the density of downtown Casper to reduce the cost of government services. They staked out sharp disagreements elsewhere, with the issue of drug-testing government employees and candidates for office emerging as a top issue. Goodenough argued that widespread drug testing violated city employees' rights and that the city should emphasize treatment options over criminal punishments. The Star-Tribune once again endorsed Burgess over Goodenough, concluding that Goodenough's focus on domestic violence "is more suited for the Legislature than the position he is seeking" and that his identification as an "iconoclast" was poorly suited to the collegial city council. Goodenough ultimately unseated Burgess, winning his first term on the council.

== 2008 U.S. Senate campaign ==
In February 2008, Goodenough announced that he would challenge Republican U.S. Senator John Barrasso in that year's special U.S. Senate election. In announcing his campaign, he noted that he would base his campaign on "giving honest opinions with regard to the root causes of the economic and social problems that face our country, as well as advancing long-range solutions to those problems." Goodenough noted that he would not accept contributions from political action committees and would limit himself to a maximum of $100 per individual donor. Goodenough was opposed in the Democratic primary by Nick Carter, a criminal defense attorney from Gillette.

The campaign between Goodenough and Carter was largely positive, with the two candidates agreeing on many issues. However, Goodenough argued that Carter was not a true Democrat, noting that he had only been registered with the Party for the "last 17 monthsout of the past 16 years." Carter was able to significantly outraise and outspend Goodenough, raising $110,000 for the primary and airing several television advertisements, while Goodenough raised only a few thousand and primarily relied on his name recognition.

In the end, Carter narrowly won the primary over Goodenough, 51-49%, by a margin of just 332 votes. The race remained uncalled on election night, but Goodenough conceded the following day. He declined to seek a recount, noting that recounts "do not change things from more than a couple of votes." Carter would ultimately lose in a landslide to Barrasso, winning just 27% of the vote to Barrasso's 73%.

== Subsequent campaigns ==
=== Casper City Council ===
Goodenough ran for re-election to the Casper City Council in 2010 and faced four candidates: Tim Stirrett, a high school teacher; Bob Hopkins, a member of the Public Utilities Advisory Board; Dan O'Hara, an electrician; and David Potter, a paramedic. The Casper Star-Tribune endorsed Stirrett and Hopkins over Goodenough; it noted that it had "no particular complaints about" his work on the city council, but that he declined to meet with them. Goodenough placed first in the field, winning 37% of the vote and advancing to the general election. He was joined by Stirrett, who won 21%, and narrowly beat out Hopkins, who won 20%.

After advancing to the general election, Goodenough was recruited by the state Democratic Party to run as its nominee for state auditor. Goodenough received 31 write-in votes in the August 2010 primary, entitling him to accept the Party's nomination. However, he ultimately declined to do so, noting that while he wasn't afraid of running in a tough race, the Party hadn't presented a vision for rebuilding the Party in the absence of Democratic governor Dave Freudenthal.

In the general election campaign against Stirrett, Goodenough emphasized his conservative views, noting his support for both property rights and the establishment of a social safety net. He and Stirrett disagreed over the proposed creation of the Old Yellowstone District, which sought to redevelop the industrial parts of Casper into mixed-use development. Goodenough argued that the District's requirements were onerous for property owners and offered the property owner "less ability to use their property commercially." Stirrett, meanwhile, supported the District's creation, noting that he "like[d] the concept of improving your community, not just on the outskirts, but within."

On election night, the race was tight, with Stirrett initially leading Goodenough. However, when all the votes were tallied, Goodenough was narrowly ahead of Stirrett by just 11 votes. Stirrett requested a recount, which ultimately affirmed Goodenough's 11-vote lead.

=== Campaigns for the Natrona County Commission ===
In 2012, Goodenough announced that he would run for a seat on the Natrona County Commission as an independent candidate. In the general election, he faced incumbent Republican County Commissioner Matt Keating; local Republican Party official Forrest Chadwick; Democrat Gino Cerullo, a member of the county Planning and Zoning Commission; and Constitution Party nominees Troy Bray and Linda Bergeron. The Casper Star-Tribune praised Goodenough as an "independent alternative" and noted that "his longtime experience in the Legislature could certainly be an advantage when it comes to building bridges between Natrona County and the lawmakers in Cheyenne," but ultimately endorsed Chadwick and Cerullo. Ultimately, Goodenough narrowly lost to Chadwick and Keating, winning 16% of the vote to Chadwick's and Keating's 22%, while coming ahead of Cerullo, who won 12%, and Bergeron and Bray, who won 5% and 4%.

Goodenough opted to run for the County Commission again in 2014 as an independent, rather than seeking re-election to the Casper City Council. He described his platform as "one third Republican, one third Democratic and one third Libertarian," and campaigned on transparency and improving public access to commission meetings.

In the general election, Goodenough faced incumbent County Commissioners Robert Hendry (a Republican) and Terry Wingerter (a Democrat), along with several other challengers: Republican John Lawson, a member of the Casper Utilities Advisory Board; Republican Stephen Schlager, a retired Casper police lieutenant; Democrat Mike Gilmore, a former state representative; and Constitution Party nominee Linda Bergeron. Goodenough lost by a narrower margin than in 2012, winning 13% of the vote to Lawson's 16%, Hendry's 16%, and Schlager's 14%, and falling just a few hundred votes of winning a seat.
