= Mike Madden (politician) =

American politician (born 1943)

Member of the Wyoming House of Representatives from the 40th district
- In office January 9, 2007 – January 8, 2019
- Preceded by: Doug Osborn
- Succeeded by: Richard Tass

Personal details
- Born: September 13, 1943 (age 83) Estherville, Iowa, U.S.
- Party: Republican
- Education: South Dakota State University (BS); Iowa State University (PhD)

Michael K. Madden (born September 13, 1943, in Estherville, Iowa) is an American politician and a Republican member of the Wyoming House of Representatives representing District 40 since January 2007.

== Education ==
Madden earned his BS from South Dakota State University and his PhD from Iowa State University.

== Elections ==
- 2012 Madden was unopposed for both the August 21, 2012 Republican Primary, winning with 2,076 votes, and the November 6, 2012 General election, winning with 3,806 votes.
- 2006 When Republican Representative Doug Osborn retired and left the District 40 seat open, Madden was unopposed for the August 22, 2006 Republican Primary, winning with 1,776 votes, and won the November 7, 2006 General election with 2,210 votes (56.6%) against Independent candidate Richard Tass.
- 2008 Madden was unopposed for both the August 19, 2008 Republican Primary, winning with 1,989 votes, and the November 4, 2008 General election, winning with 4,305 votes.
- 2010 Madden won the three-way August 17, 2010 Republican Primary with 2,205 votes (61.0%), setting up a rematch with his 2006 Independent opponent, Richard Tass; Madden won the November 2, 2010 General election with 2,811 votes (62.4%) against Tass.
