= Richard Larsen =

Richard Larsen may refer to:

- Richard F. Larsen (born 1936), former Lieutenant Governor of North Dakota
- Rick Larsen (born 1965), U.S. Representative from Washington

== See also ==
- Richard Larson (disambiguation)
