= Wyoming's 9th State Senate district =

American legislative district

- Wyoming's 9th State Senate district as of 2022
Senator
Chris Rothfuss; D–Laramie
- Demographics: 80% White; 1% Black; 10% Hispanic; 5% Asian; 1% Native American; 3% Multiracial
- Population (2022) • Voting age: 18,295; 18

Wyoming's 9th State Senate district is one of 31 districts in the Wyoming Senate. The district encompasses part of Albany County. It has been represented by Democratic Senator Chris Rothfuss, the Senate minority leader, since 2013.

In 1992, the state of Wyoming switched from electing state legislators by county to a district-based system.

== List of members representing the district ==
Representative	Party	Term	Note
Lisa F. Kinney	Democratic	1993 – 1995	Elected in 1992.
Vincent Picard	Republican	1995 – 1999	Elected in 1994.
Mike Massie	Democratic	1999 – January 11, 2011	Elected in 1998. Re-elected in 2002. Re-elected in 2006.
Chris Rothfuss	Democratic	January 11, 2011 – Present	Elected in 2010. Re-elected in 2014. Re-elected in 2018. Re-elected in 2022.

== Recent election results ==
=== Federal and statewide results ===
Office	Year	District	Statewide
President	2016	Trump 40.25% – Clinton 46.37%	Donald; Trump
President	2012	Romney 42.49% – Obama 52.10%	Mitt; Romney
Senate	2012	Barrasso 51.73% – Chesnut 45.79%	John; Barrasso
Representative	2012	Lummis 45.86% – Henrichsen 44.61%	Cynthia; Lummis

=== 2006 ===
Senate District 9 general election
Party	Candidate	Votes	%
Democratic	Mike Massie (incumbent)	4,370	100.0%
Total votes		4,370	100.0%
Democratic hold			

=== 2010 ===
Senate District 9 general election
Party	Candidate	Votes	%
Democratic	Chris Rothfuss	3,572	100.0%
Total votes		3,572	100.0%
Democratic hold			

=== 2014 ===
Senate District 9 general election
Party	Candidate	Votes	%
Democratic	Chris Rothfuss (incumbent)	3,182	100.0%
Total votes		3,182	100.0%
Democratic hold			

=== 2018 ===
Democratic incumbent Chris Rothfuss won the election with no challengers.

Senate District 9 general election
Party	Candidate	Votes	%
Democratic	Chris Rothfuss (incumbent)	4,668	96.59%
Write-In	Write-ins	165	3.41%
Total votes		4,833	100.00%
Invalid or blank votes		1,562	N/A
Democratic hold			

=== 2022 ===
Senate District 9 General Election
Party	Candidate	Votes	%
Democratic	Chris Rothfuss (incumbent)	3,221	62.9
Republican	Diana Seabeck	1894	37.0
Write-in		9	0.2
Total votes		5,124	100%

== Historical district boundaries ==
Map	Description	Apportionment plan	Notes
	Albany County (part)	1992 Apportionment Plan	
	Albany County (part)	2002 Apportionment Plan	
	Albany County (part)	2012 Apportionment Plan	
