= James Lee Anderson =

American politician (born 1948)

Member of the Wyoming Senate from the 28th district
- Incumbent
- Assumed office January 7, 2013
- Preceded by: Kit Jennings

Personal details
- Born: July 24, 1948 (age 78) Sheridan, Wyoming, U.S.
- Party: Republican
- Education: Casper College

Military service
- Branch/service: United States Army
- Years of service: 1969–1970

James Lee Anderson (born July 24, 1948) is an American politician and a Republican member of the Wyoming Senate representing District 28 since January 7, 2013.

During the 2012 presidential election he and Eli Bebout served as co-chairs of Mitt Romney's presidential campaign in Wyoming.

== Education ==
Anderson graduated from Kaycee High School in 1966 and earned his AS from Casper College.

== Elections ==
- 2012 Anderson challenged incumbent Republican Senator Kit Jennings in the three-way August 21, 2012 Republican Primary, winning with 928 votes (51.2%), and won the November 6, 2012 General election with 4,560 votes (60.5%) against Democratic nominee Kim Holloway.
