= Fred Emerich =

American politician

Member of the Wyoming Senate from the 5th district
- In office January 11, 2011 – January 8. 2019
- Preceded by: Rick Hunnicutt
- Succeeded by: Lynn Hutchings

Personal details
- Born: 1945 or 1946 (age 80–81)
- Party: Republican
- Education: University of Wyoming; Colorado State University

Fred Emerich is an American politician and a Republican member of the Wyoming Senate representing District 5 since January 11, 2011.

== Education ==
Emerich earned his BS in microbiology from the University of Wyoming and his DMV from Colorado State University.

== Elections ==
- 2010 When Republican Senator Bob Fecht left the Legislature and left the District 5 seat open, Emerich was unopposed for the August 17, 2010 Republican Primary, winning with 2,707 votes (51.2%), and won the November 2, 2010 General election with 3,002 votes (49.6%) against Democratic nominee Lori Millin.
- 2014: Emerich was unopposed in the general election on November 4, 2014, and won a second 4-year term.
