= Affie Ellis =

American politician

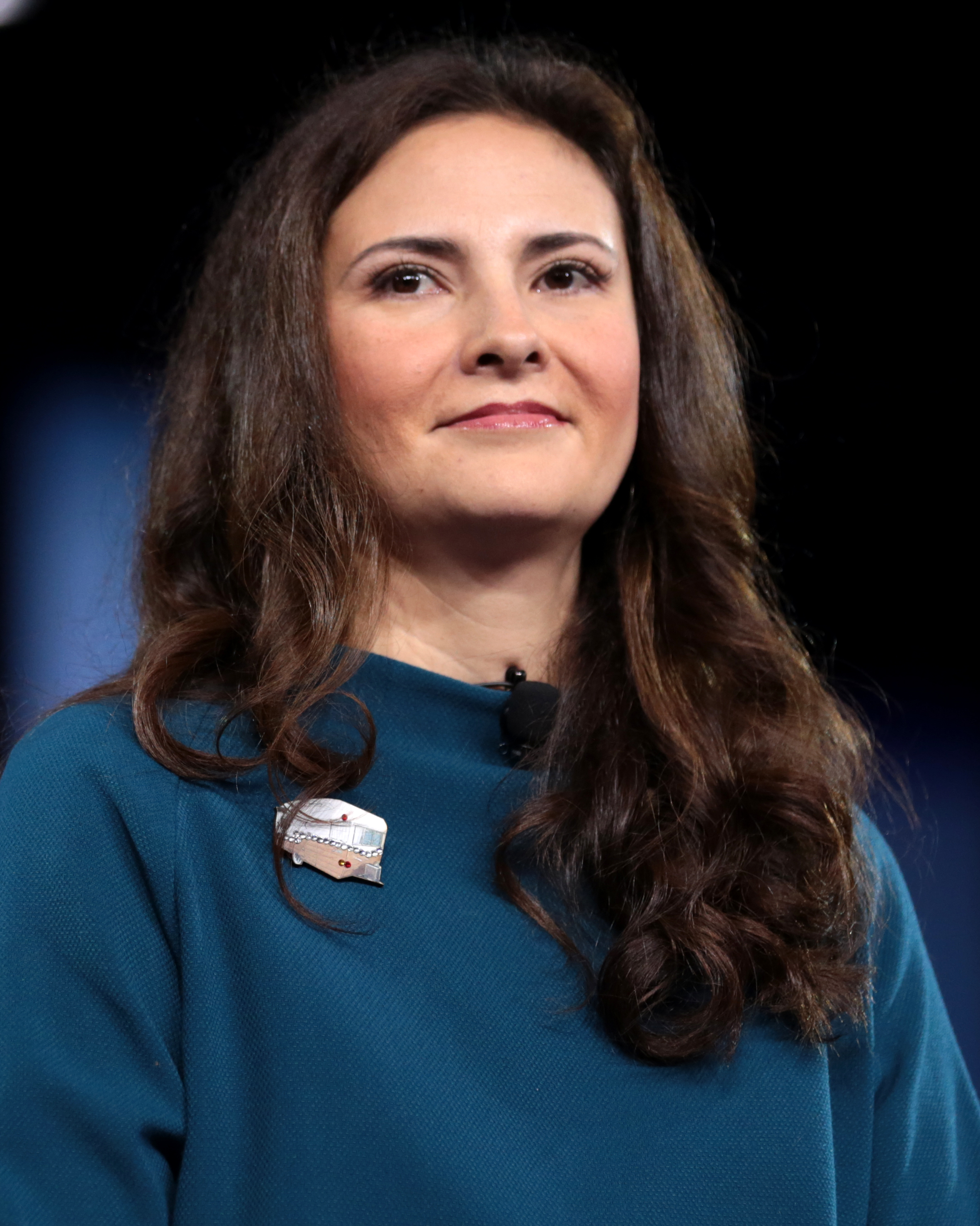

Member of the Wyoming Senate from the 8th district
- In office January 10, 2017 – January 6, 2025
- Preceded by: Floyd Esquibel
- Succeeded by: Jared Olsen

Personal details
- Born: 1979/1980 Jackson Hole, Wyoming, U.S.
- Party: Republican
- Spouse: Dennis Ellis
- Children: 3
- Education: University of Wyoming (BS); University of Colorado Law School (JD)

Affie Ellis (née Burnside; born c. 1979/1980) is an American politician who served in the Wyoming Senate from the 8th district as a member of the Republican Party from 2017-2025. She is a member of the Navajo Nation and is the first Native American to serve in the Wyoming Senate.

== Early life ==
Affie Burnside was born to Jim and Lenoa Burnside, both of whom were born on the Navajo Reservation. She married Dennis Ellis, with whom she had three children.

She graduated from Jackson Hole High School. From 1996 to 2000, Ellis attended the University of Wyoming and graduated with a Bachelor of Science in political science and American Indian studies. From 2004 to 2007, she attended the University of Colorado Law School and graduated with a Juris Doctor.

== Career ==
From 2000 to 2004, Ellis worked as a legislative aid to Senator Craig L. Thomas and was in charge of Indian, public lands, and housing issues. On January 6, 2004, Ellis was appointed to serve as Director of Congressional and Public Affairs for the National Indian Gaming Commission. In 2010, she was appointed by Senate Majority Leader Mitch McConnell to serve on the Tribal Law and Order Commission after being recommended by Senator John Barrasso.

=== Wyoming Senate ===
In 2016, she ran with the Republican nomination for the Wyoming Senate in the 8th district and defeated incumbent Democratic Senator Floyd Esquibel. She is the first Native American and member of the Navajo Nation to serve in the Wyoming Senate.

During Ellis' tenure in the Wyoming Senate she served on the Revenue committee. During the 2018 Wyoming gubernatorial election she endorsed Sam Galeotos during the Republican primary.

== Electoral history ==
2016 Wyoming Senate 8th district election
Primary election
Party	Candidate	Votes	%
Republican	Affie Ellis	1,052	97.77%
Write-in		24	2.23%
Total votes		1,076	100.00%
Undervote	Invalid votes	269	
General election
Republican	Affie Ellis	3,638	60.66%
Democratic	Floyd Esquibel (incumbent)	2,346	39.12%
Write-in		13	0.22%
Total votes		5,997	100.00%
Undervote	Invalid votes	285	

2020 Wyoming Senate 8th district election
Primary election
Party	Candidate	Votes	%
Republican	Affie Ellis (incumbent)	1,120	64.11%
Republican	Dan Young	623	35.66%
Write-in		4	0.23%
Total votes		1,747	100.00%
Undervote/Overvote	Invalid votes	34	
General election
Republican	Affie Ellis (incumbent)	4,231	61.31%
Democratic	James Byrd	2,623	38.01%
Write-in		47	0.68%
Total votes		6,901	100.00%
Undervote/Overvote	Invalid votes	112	

== See also ==
- List of Native American politicians
- Native American women in politics
