= Lynn Hutchings =

American politician (born 1960)

Member of the Wyoming Senate from the 5th district
- Incumbent
- Assumed office January 7, 2019
- Preceded by: Fred Emerich
- Succeeded by: Lauren Schoenfeld (elect)

Member of the Wyoming House of Representatives from the 42nd district
- In office January 8, 2013 – January 5, 2015
- Preceded by: Pete Illoway
- Succeeded by: Jim Blackburn

Personal details
- Born: September 6, 1960 (age 66) Cheyenne, Wyoming, U.S.
- Party: Republican
- Education: University of Wyoming
- Website: hutchingsforhouse.com

Military service
- Branch/service: Air National Guard for Wyoming, Colorado, & Alaska
- Years of service: 1978–1984, 1984–1991, & 1991–2000
- Rank: Master Sergeant

Lynn Hutchings (born September 6, 1960, in Cheyenne, Wyoming) is an American politician and member of the Wyoming State Senate representing Cheyenne. She previously represented District 42 in the Wyoming House of Representatives from January 2013 until January 2015.

== Education ==
Hutchings graduated from Cheyenne East High School and attended the University of Wyoming.

== Military ==
Hutchings served in the Wyoming Air National Guard, Colorado Air National Guard and the Alaska Air National Guard. She retired as a master sergeant after 22 years. She was an Information Technology Specialist/System Analyst.

== Elections ==
- 2012 - When Republican Representative Pete Illoway retired and left the District 42 seat open, Hutchings won the five-way August 21, 2012 Republican Primary with 679 votes (36.7%), and won the November 6, 2012 General election with 2,833 votes (68.0%) against Democratic Party candidate Gary Datus.
- 2010 - Hutchings initially challenged District 7 incumbent Republican Representative Bryan Pedersen, in the August 17, 2010 Republican Primary, but lost to Pedersen, who was unopposed for the November 2, 2010 General election, and held the seat until 2013.

== Controversial comments ==
=== Comments on homosexuality ===
Hutchings generated controversy in February 2019 when the group Wyoming Equality reported Hutchings compared homosexuality to bestiality/pedophilia to a group of young people she was meeting with. The group was composed of 14- and 15-year-old students who were members of their school's gay-straight alliance. The students were visiting the legislature on Feb. 1 to lobby support for House Bill 230, legislation which sought to protect LGBTQ people from job and hiring discrimination. The bill died when it failed to meet a deadline in the Wyoming House of Representatives. The complaint claims Hutchings made the following statement to the students: "If my sexual orientation was to have sex with all of the men in there and I had sex with all of the women in there and then they brought their children and I had sex with all of them and then brought their dogs in and I had sex with them, should I be protected for my sexual orientation?"

=== Comments on death penalty ===
Hutchings argued that without the death penalty, Jesus Christ would not have been able to die to absolve the sins of mankind, and therefore capital punishment should be maintained. She stated, "The greatest man who ever lived died via the death penalty for you and me. I'm grateful to him for our future hope because of this. Governments were instituted to execute justice. If it wasn't for Jesus dying via the death penalty, we would all have no hope." Her comments were featured on an episode about lethal injection on Last Week Tonight with John Oliver.
