= Richard Tass =

American politician

Member of the Wyoming House of Representatives from the 40th district
- In office January 7, 2019 – January 12, 2021
- Preceded by: Mike Madden
- Succeeded by: Barry Crago

Personal details
- Born: Buffalo, Wyoming, U.S.
- Party: Republican
- Children: 2
- Education: Casper College
- Website: Richard Tass

Military service
- Allegiance: United States

Richard Tass is an American politician and former Wyoming state legislator. A member of the Republican Party, Tass represented the 40th district in the Wyoming House of Representatives from 2019 to 2021.

== Early life ==
Tass was born in Buffalo, Wyoming.

== Education ==
Tass earned an associate degree from Casper College in 1966.

== Military career ==
Tass served in the United States Army during the Vietnam War.

== Professional career ==
On November 6, 2018, Tass was elected to the Wyoming House of Representatives where he represents the 40th district. He won with 60.1% of the vote. Tass assumed office on January 7, 2019. On August 18, 2020, when Tass, sought re-election, he was defeated by Barry Crago in the Republican primary. Tass's term expired on January 4, 2021.

== Personal life ==
Tass is Catholic. Tass has two children and four grandchildren. Tass is a member of the National Rifle Association of America.
