= Wyoming's 43rd House of Representatives district =

American legislative district

Wyoming's 43rd State House of Representatives district
- Wyoming's 43rd House of Representatives district as of 2022
Representative
Ann Lucas; R–Cheyenne
- Demographics: 66% White; 8% Black; 19% Hispanic; 1% Asian; 1% Other; 5% Multiracial
- Population (2022): 9,892

Wyoming's 43rd House of Representatives district is one of 62 districts in the Wyoming House of Representatives. The district encompasses part of Laramie County. It is represented by Republican Representative Ann Lucas of Cheyenne.

In 1992, the state of Wyoming switched from electing state legislators by county to a district-based system.

== List of members representing the district ==
Representative	Party	Term	Note
Kathryn Sessions	Democratic	1993 – 1999	Elected in 1992. Re-elected in 1994. Re-elected in 1996.
Doug Samuelson	Republican	1999 – 2003	Elected in 1998. Re-elected in 2000.
Ed Prosser	Republican	2003 – 2005	Elected in 2002.
Dan Zwonitzer	Republican	2005 – 2025	Elected in 2004. Re-elected in 2006. Re-elected in 2008. Re-elected in 2010. Re-elected in 2012. Re-elected in 2014. Re-elected in 2016. Re-elected in 2018. Re-elected in 2020. Re-elected in 2022.
Ann Lucas	Republican	2025 – present	Elected in 2024.

== Recent election results ==
=== 2014 ===
House district 43 general election
Party	Candidate	Votes	%
Republican	Dan Zwonitzer (Incumbent)	1,474	96.71%
Write-ins		50	3.28%
Total votes		1,524	100.0%
Invalid or blank votes		424	
Republican hold			

=== 2016 ===
House district 43 general election
Party	Candidate	Votes	%
Republican	Dan Zwonitzer (Incumbent)	2,620	97.21%
Write-ins		75	2.78%
Total votes		2,695	100.0%
Invalid or blank votes		611	
Republican hold			

=== 2018 ===
House district 43 general election
Party	Candidate	Votes	%
Republican	Dan Zwonitzer (Incumbent)	1,901	97.13%
Write-ins		56	2.86%
Total votes		1,957	100.0%
Invalid or blank votes		470	
Republican hold			

=== 2020 ===
House district 43 general election
Party	Candidate	Votes	%
Republican	Dan Zwonitzer (Incumbent)	2,918	94.03%
Write-ins		185	5.96%
Total votes		3,103	100.0%
Invalid or blank votes		398	
Republican hold			

=== 2022 ===
House district 43 general election
Party	Candidate	Votes	%
Republican	Dan Zwonitzer (Incumbent)	2,193	94.56%
Write-ins		126	5.43%
Total votes		2,319	100.0%
Invalid or blank votes		357	
Republican hold			

=== 2024 ===
House district 43 general election
Party	Candidate	Votes	%
Republican	Ann Lucas	3,540	91.85%
Write-ins		314	8.14%
Total votes		3,854	100.0%
Invalid or blank votes		473	
Republican hold			

== Historical district boundaries ==
Map	Description	Apportionment Plan	Notes
	Laramie County (part)	1992 Apportionment Plan	
	Laramie County (part)	2002 Apportionment Plan	
	Laramie County (part)	2012 Apportionment Plan	
