= Orison =

Orison may refer to:

- An archaic word for prayer
- Orison Rudolph Aggrey (1926-2016), United States Ambassador to Senegal, Gambia and Romania
- Orison Whipple Hungerford, Jr., birth name of American actor Ty Hardin (born 1930)
- Orison Swett Marden (1850-1924), American writer
- Orison S. Marden (lawyer) (1896-1975), American lawyer, president of the American Bar Association
- "Orison" (The X-Files), an episode of The X-Files
- A futuristic recording device in the novel Cloud Atlas by David Mitchell

== See also ==
- Orissus or Orisson, third-century BC king of the Oretani people in Iberia
