= H. L. Jensen =

American politician (1928–2020)

Member of the Wyoming House of Representatives
- In office 1975–1991

Personal details
- Born: December 26, 1928 Salt Lake City, Utah, U.S.
- Died: December 22, 2020 (aged 91) Des Moines, Iowa, U.S.
- Party: Democratic
- Occupation: retailer

H. L. Jensen (December 26, 1928 – December 22, 2020) was an American politician in the state of Wyoming. He served in the Wyoming House of Representatives as a member of the Democratic Party. He attended the University of Utah and was a liquor retailer.
