= Jack Crews =

American politician

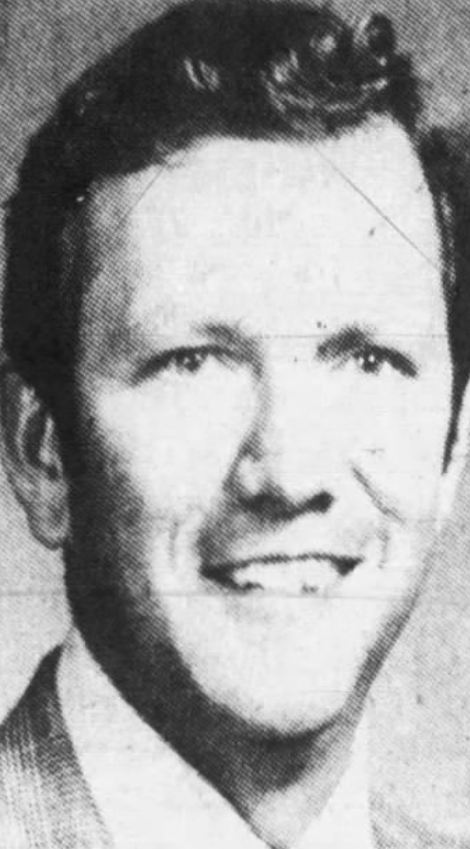
- Crews in 1974

Member of the Wyoming House of Representatives
- In office 1975–1978

Personal details
- Born: April 21, 1940 (age 86) Cheyenne, Wyoming, U.S.
- Party: Democratic
- Children: 2
- Education: University of Wyoming; University of Arizona

Jack Crews (born April 21, 1940) is an American politician. He served as a Democratic member of the Wyoming House of Representatives.

== Life and career ==
Crews was born in Cheyenne, Wyoming. He attended the University of Wyoming and the University of Arizona.

Crews served in the Wyoming House of Representatives from 1975 to 1978.
