= Wyoming's 5th State Senate district =

American legislative district

- Wyoming's 5th State Senate district as of 2022
Senator
Lynn Hutchings; R–Cheyenne
- Demographics: 75% White; 2% Black; 17% Hispanic; 2% Asian; 1% Native American; 1% Other; 3% Multiracial
- Population (2022): 17,726

Wyoming's 5th State Senate district is one of 31 districts in the Wyoming Senate. The district encompasses part of Laramie County. It is represented by Republican Senator Lynn Hutchings of Cheyenne.

In 1992, the state of Wyoming switched from electing state legislators by county to a district-based system.

== List of members representing the district ==
Representative	Party	Term	Note
Cynthia Lummis	Republican	1993 – 1995	Elected in 1992.
Donald Lawler	Republican	1995 – 1999	Elected in 1994.
John Hanes	Republican	1999 – 2007	Elected in 1998. Re-elected in 2002.
Bob Fecht	Republican	2007 – 2008	Elected in 2006. Resigned in 2008.
Rick Hunnicutt	Republican	2009 – 2011	Appointed in 2009.
Fred Emerich	Republican	2011 – 2019	Elected in 2010. Re-elected in 2014.
Lynn Hutchings	Republican	2019 – present	Elected in 2018. Re-elected in 2022.

== Recent election results ==
=== 2006 ===
Senate district 5 general election
Party	Candidate	Votes	%
Republican	Bob Hecht	3,793	61.78%
Democratic	Randall M. Lane	2,346	38.21%
Total votes		6,139	100.0%
Republican hold			

=== 2010 ===
Senate district 5 general election
Party	Candidate	Votes	%
Republican	Fred Emerich	3,002	50.80%
Democratic	Lori A. Millin	2,896	49.00%
Write-ins		11	0.18%
Total votes		5,909	100.0%
Invalid or blank votes		140	
Republican hold			

=== 2014 ===
Senate district 5 general election
Party	Candidate	Votes	%
Republican	Fred Emerich (incumbent)	5,026	97.59%
Write-ins		124	2.40%
Total votes		5,150	100.0%
Invalid or blank votes		1,225	
Republican hold			

=== 2018 ===
Senate district 5 general election
Party	Candidate	Votes	%
Republican	Lynn Hutchings	5,382	94.65%
Write-ins		304	5.34%
Total votes		5,686	100.0%
Invalid or blank votes		1,776	
Republican hold			

=== 2022 ===
Senate district 5 general election
Party	Candidate	Votes	%
Republican	Lynn Hutchings (incumbent)	3,284	70.57%
Democratic	Ted Hanlon	1,354	29.09%
Write-ins		15	0.32%
Total votes		4,653	100.0%
Invalid or blank votes		87	
Republican hold			

== Historical district boundaries ==
Map	Description	Apportionment Plan	Notes
	Laramie County (part)	1992 Apportionment Plan	
	Laramie County (part)	2002 Apportionment Plan	
	Laramie County (part)	2012 Apportionment Plan	
