= Arthur L. Buck =

American politician

Member of the Wyoming House of Representatives
- In office 1957–1971
- In office 1974–1978

Personal details
- Born: October 31, 1906 Wichita, Kansas, U.S.
- Died: April 27, 1980 (aged 73)
- Party: Democratic
- Education: Carleton College; University of Wyoming; Northwestern University

Arthur L. Buck (October 31, 1906 – April 27, 1980) was an American politician. He served as a Democratic member of the Wyoming House of Representatives.

== Life and career ==
Buck was born in Wichita, Kansas. He attended Carleton College, the University of Wyoming and Northwestern University.

Buck served in the Wyoming House of Representatives from 1957 to 1971 and again from 1974 to 1978.

Buck died on April 27, 1980, at the age of 73.
