= William C. Edwards (Wyoming politician) =

American politician (born 1934)

Member of the Wyoming House of Representatives
- In office 1975–1984

Personal details
- Born: May 17, 1934 (age 92) Waukegan, Illinois, U.S.
- Party: Democratic
- Education: Carlton College; University of Wyoming; University of Nebraska

William C. Edwards (born May 17, 1934) is an American politician. He served as a Democratic member of the Wyoming House of Representatives.

== Life and career ==
Edwards was born in Waukegan, Illinois. He attended Carlton College, the University of Wyoming and the University of Nebraska.

Edwards was a biology instructor at Laramie County Community College.

Edwards served in the Wyoming House of Representatives from 1975 to 1984.
