= Kit Jennings =

American politician (born 1952)

Member of the Wyoming Senate from the 28th district
- In office January 3, 2005 – January 3, 2013
- Preceded by: Keith Goodenough
- Succeeded by: James Lee Anderson

Personal details
- Born: December 7, 1952 (age 73) Glasgow, Montana, U.S.
- Party: Republican
- Occupation: Energy Exposition www.energyexposition.com

Kit Jennings (born December 7, 1952) is a Republican member of the Wyoming Senate, representing the 28th district from 2005 to 2013.
