= Donald Lawler =

Irish footballer

Personal information
- Date of birth: 18 April 1922
- Place of birth: Dublin, Ireland
- Date of death: 20 March 1988 (aged 65)
- Place of death: Dallas, Texas, United States

International career
Years	Team	Apps	(Gls)
1948	Ireland	1	(0)

Donald Joseph Lawler (18 April 1922 – 20 March 1988) was an Irish footballer. He competed in the men's tournament at the 1948 Summer Olympics.
