= 1992 United States House of Representatives election in Wyoming =

- November 3, 1992
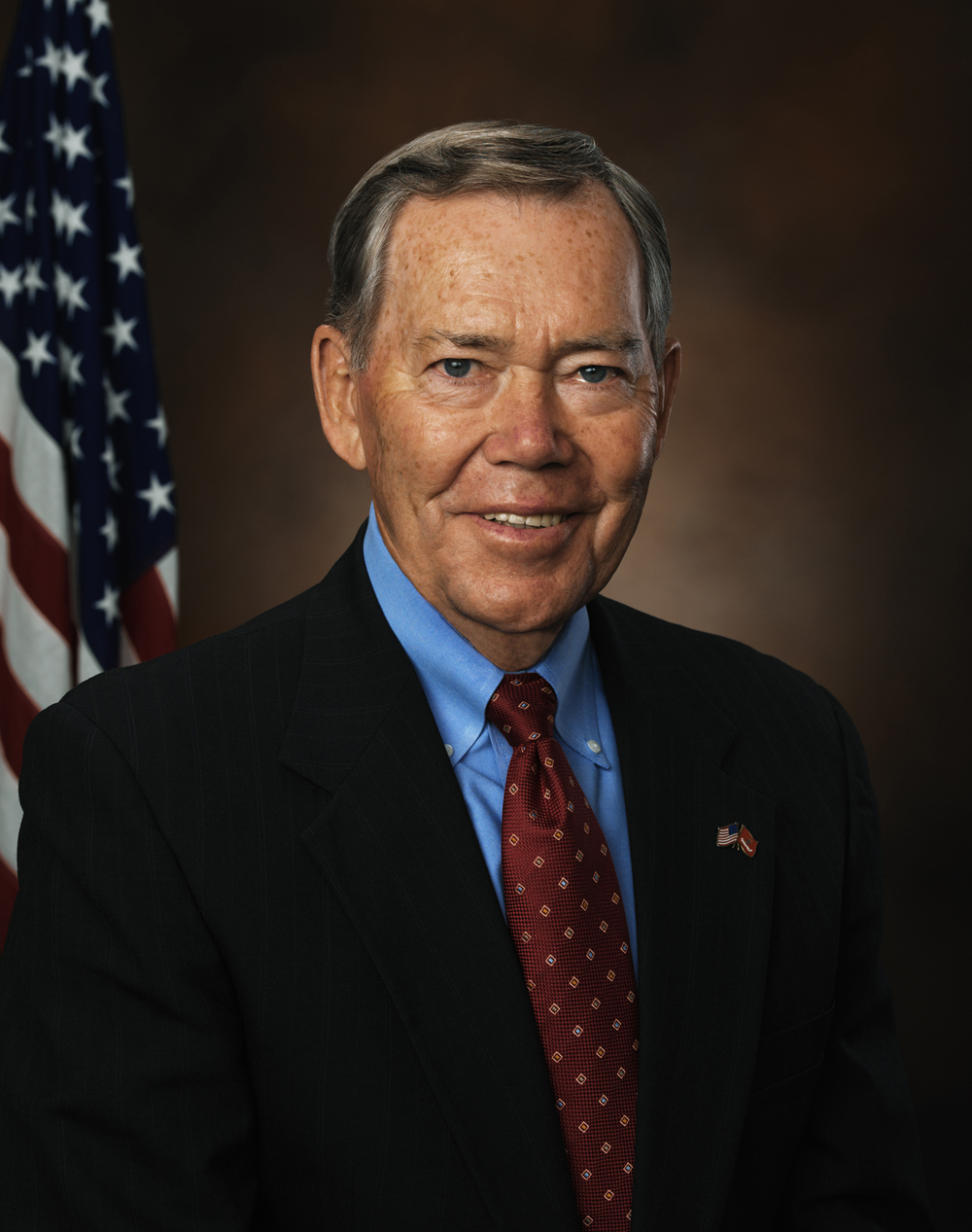

Nominee	Craig L. Thomas	Jon Herschler
Party	Republican	Democratic
Popular vote	113,882	77,418
Percentage	57.81%	39.30%
U.S. Representative before election
Craig L. Thomas
Republican
Elected U.S. Representative
Craig L. Thomas
Republican

The 1992 United States House of Representatives election in Wyoming were held on November 3, 1992, to determine who would represent the state of Wyoming in the United States House of Representatives. Wyoming has one, at large district in the House, apportioned according to the 1990 United States census, due to its low population. Representatives are elected for two-year terms.

As of 2026, this is the last time a man was elected to the House of Representatives from Wyoming's only congressional district.

== Major candidates ==
=== Democratic ===
- Jon Herschler

=== Republican ===
- Craig L. Thomas, incumbent U.S. congressman

== Results ==
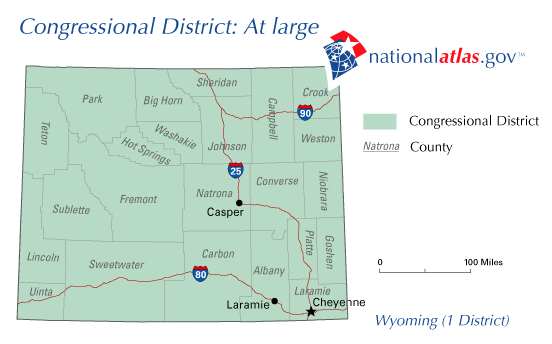

Wyoming's at-large congressional district election, 1992
Party	Candidate	Votes	%
Republican	Craig L. Thomas (inc.)	113,882	57.81
Democratic	Jon Herschler	77,418	39.30
Libertarian	Craig Alan McCune	5,677	2.88
Total votes		196,977	100.00
Republican hold			
