= 1984 United States House of Representatives election in Wyoming =

- November 6, 1984
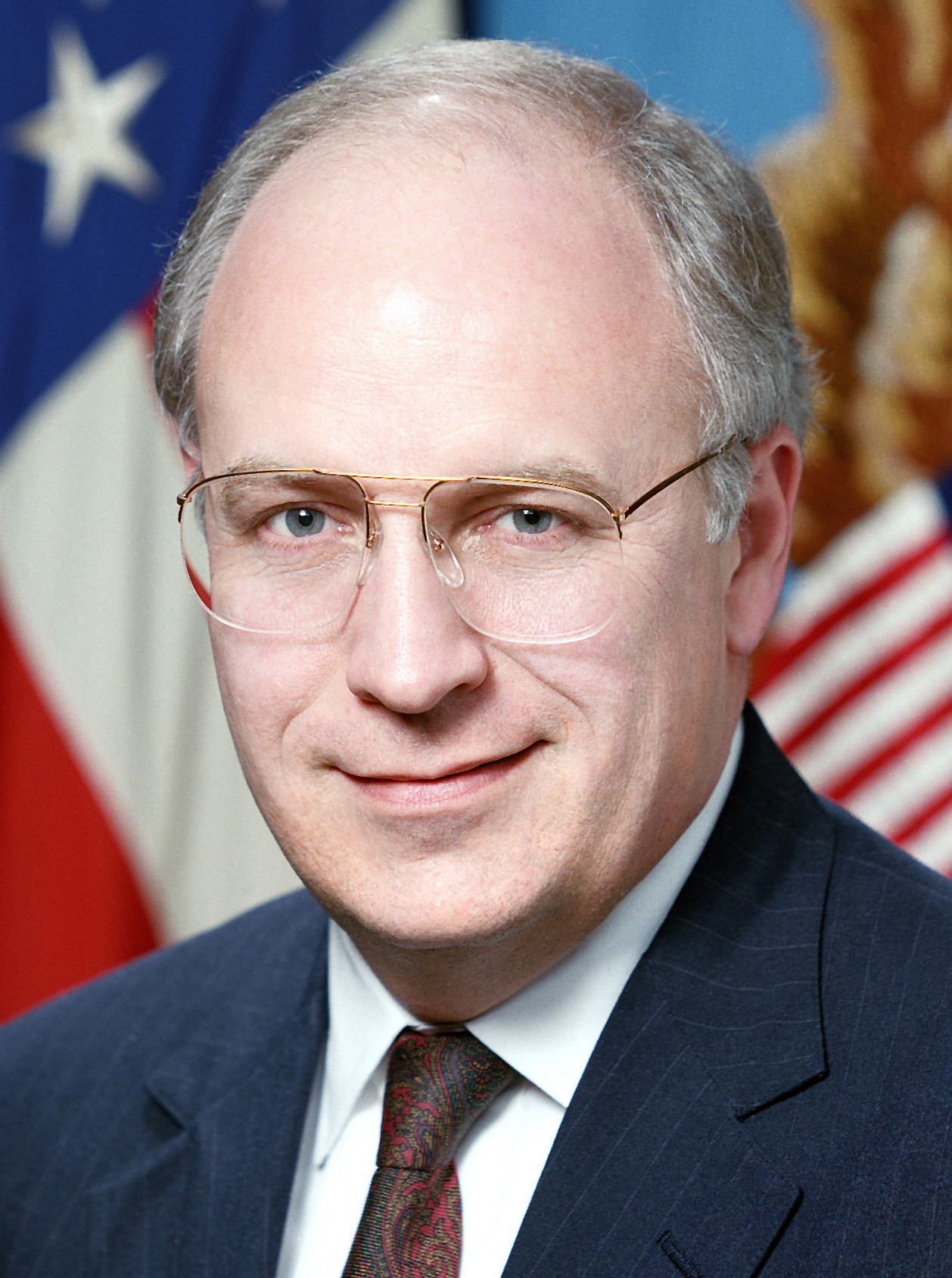

Nominee	Dick Cheney	Hugh B. McFadden, Jr.
Party	Republican	Democratic
Popular vote	138,234	45,857
Percentage	73.57%	24.40%
- County results Cheney: 50–60% 60–70% 70–80% 80–90%
U.S. Representative before election
Dick Cheney
Republican
Elected U.S. Representative
Dick Cheney
Republican

The 1984 United States House of Representatives election in Wyoming was held on November 6, 1984. Incumbent Representative Dick Cheney defeated Hugh B. McFadden, Jr. with 73.57% of the vote.

== Democratic primary ==
United States House of Representatives Democratic primary in Wyoming, 1984
Party	Candidate	Votes	%
Democratic	Hugh B. McFadden, Jr.	29,361	73.21%
Democratic	Keith Goodenough	10,742	26.79%
Total votes		40,103	100%

== Results ==
United States House of Representatives election in Wyoming, 1984
Party	Candidate	Votes	%
Republican	Dick Cheney (incumbent)	138,234	73.57%
Democratic	Hugh B. McFadden, Jr.	45,857	24.40%
Libertarian	Craig Alan McCune	3,813	2.03%
Total votes		187,904	100%
