= 1994 United States House of Representatives election in Wyoming =

1994 United States House of Representatives election in Wyoming, At-large district
- November 8, 1994
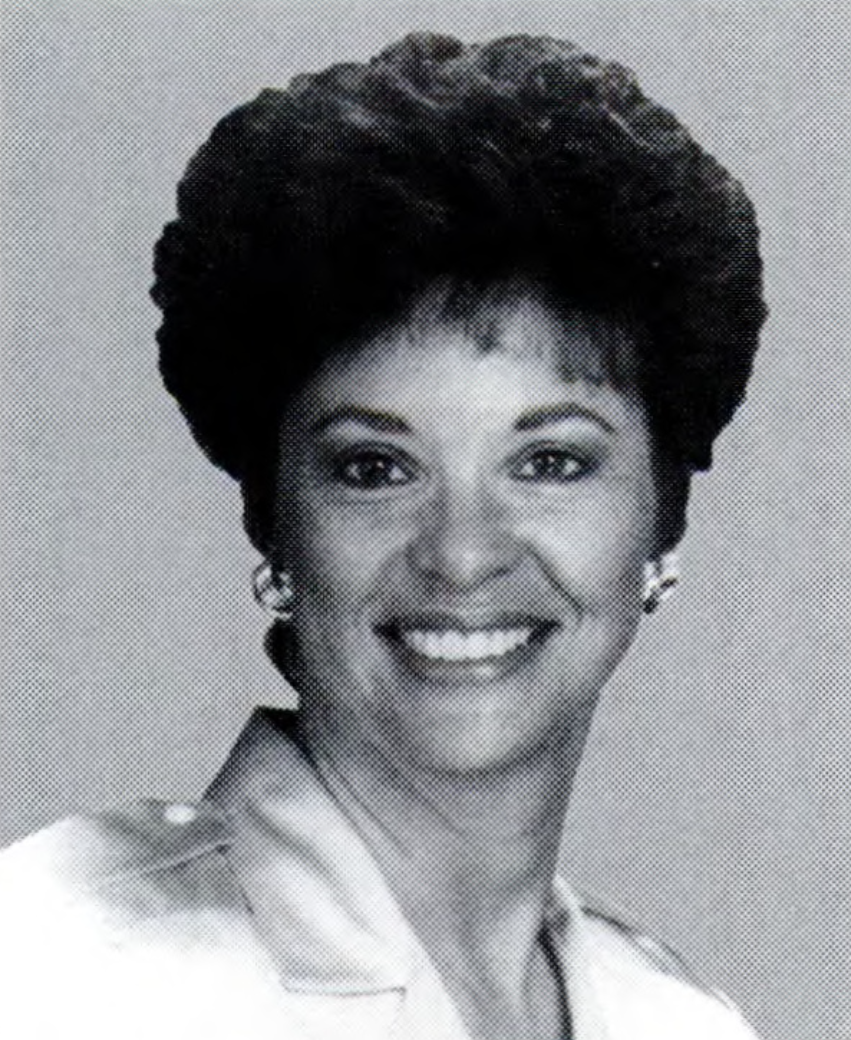

Nominee	Barbara Cubin	Bob Schuster	Dave Dawson
Party	Republican	Democratic	Libertarian
Popular vote	104,426	81,022	10,749
Percentage	53.23%	41.30%	5.48%
U.S. Representative before election
Craig L. Thomas
Republican
Elected U.S. Representative
Craig L. Thomas
Republican

The 1994 United States House of Representatives election in Wyoming were held on November 8, 1994, to determine who would represent the state of Wyoming in the United States House of Representatives. Wyoming has one, at-large district in the House, apportioned according to the 1990 United States census, due to its low population. Representatives are elected for two-year terms. This election was for an open seat because incumbent Craig L. Thomas retired to run for U.S. senator for Wyoming.

== Major candidates ==
=== Democratic ===
- Bob Schuster

=== Republican ===
- Barbara Cubin

== Results ==
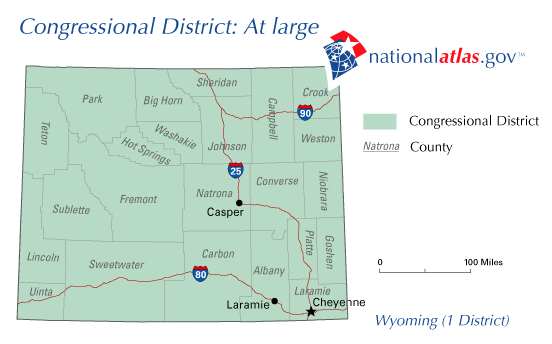

Wyoming's at-large congressional district election, 1994
Party	Candidate	Votes	%
Republican	Barbara Cubin	104,426	53.23
Democratic	Bob Schuster	81,022	41.30
Libertarian	Dave Dawson	10,749	5.48
Total votes		196,197	100.00
Republican hold			
