= Lisa Kinney =

Wyoming politician

Minority Leader of the Wyoming Senate
- In office January 1993 – January 1995
- Preceded by: Frank Prevedel
- Succeeded by: James L. Applegate

Member of the Wyoming Senate
- In office January 1985 – January 1995
- Succeeded by: Vincent Picard
- Constituency: Albany County (1985–1993); 9th district (1993–1995)

Personal details
- Born: 1950 or 1951 (age 75–76) Laramie, Wyoming, U.S.
- Party: Democratic
- Education: University of Wyoming (BA, JD); University of Oregon (MLIS)

Lisa Frances Kinney (born 1950/1951) is an American politician and attorney. She represented the 9th district and the Albany County district in the Wyoming Senate from 1985 to 1995 and served as minority leader from 1992 to 1994. Kinney was the Democratic nominee for Wyoming's at-large congressional district in 2026.

== Early life and career ==
Kinney was born in Laramie, Wyoming. After graduating from the University of Wyoming with a Bachelor of Arts in Spanish in 1973, Kinney received a master’s degree in library science (MLIS) from the University of Oregon and worked as director of the Albany County Library in 1977. She then earned a Juris Doctor from the University of Wyoming College of Law in 1986 and worked as an attorney at the Corthell and King law firm in Laramie.

== Political career ==
Kinney was elected to the Wyoming Senate in 1984 and served as the body's minority leader from 1992 to 1994.

In April 2026, Kinney announced her candidacy for Wyoming's at-large congressional district in the 2026 United States House of Representatives election in Wyoming.

== Political viewpoints ==
=== Healthcare ===
In an interview with Wyofile's 2026 Voter Guide, Kinney addressed healthcare policy with the following ideas:

- ACA subsdies were cut in the Big Beautiful Bill (BBB) so 11,000 people in Wyoming lost their healthcare and others saw an increase of thousands of dollars per month. 10% of Wyomingites do not have any health insurance. We must analyze and amend the BBB to reduce the pain for Wyoming.
- We need to bring the ACA subsidies back for 3 years and work with the Senate to develop a plan for the U.S. which provides affordable health care, reduced cost of prescription drugs, and accessibility for all.
- A reason health care is expensive is because our insurance pool is small. We need to get a group of Western states together and form a bigger pool to reduce costs. I will work with both parties to increase our pool and decrease the cost of health care premiums for Wyoming.

=== Immigration ===
In a 2026 article about Kinney by the Cowboy State Daily titled Democrat Lisa Kinney Enters House Race, Says Protect Public Lands, Kinney's views on the federal immigration policies at that time are described with the following by the article:

If elected, Kinney said she’d like to investigate whether ICE officers run on a bounty system, adding that she’d also like to implement a truly worst-of-the-worst deportation policy. She correctly noted that many people taken into deportation proceedings committed misdemeanors or less.

Wyoming Senate
Preceded by Frank Prevedel	Minority Leader of the Wyoming Senate; 1993–1995	Succeeded by James L. Applegate
