= Larry Gilbertz =

American politician (1929–2011)

Lawrence Eugene Gilbertz (February 3, 1929 – November 26, 2011) was an American politician who served in the Wyoming Senate from 1993 to 1998.

== Early life and family ==
Larry Gilbertz's ancestors immigrated to Nezperce, Idaho in 1905 from Luxembourg. His father Jacob moved near Savageton, Wyoming, after the passage of the Stock-Raising Homestead Act in 1916. After arriving in Wyoming, Jacob enlisted in the United States Army. While traveling to Europe by ship, he fell ill with the flu, and spent the rest of World War I recuperating in a New York City hospital. Jacob Gilbertz returned to Wyoming in 1919. In 1928, he married Lena Schlautmann DeCourcey, whose first husband had died the previous year. Larry Gilbertz was born to Jacob and Lena on February 3, 1929. He had had one biological sibling, a younger sister named Dorothy, and was raised in a blended family. Gilbertz graduated from Campbell County High School.

After serving with the United States military in Allied-occupied Germany, Larry Gilbertz met and married Verna Ann Howell in September 1955. Gilbertz worked for a uranium company based in Douglas, but left the industry to maintain the family ranch. The couple retired from ranching in 1986, nine years after the discovery of oil on the property.

== Public service career ==
Larry Gilbertz was a member of the District 9 school board, the Court Reform Committee, the farmers' cooperative, and served on the board of two banks in his hometown of Gillette. He ran unopposed in the 1992 Republican Party primary for the newly established Wyoming Senate district 23, and faced Democratic Party candidate Sandy Daly in the general election. Due in part to his wife's diagnosis of ovarian cancer in 1996, Gilbertz chose to retire from the state senate upon the completion of his second term in office. He was succeeded by Steven Youngbauer. Gilbertz died at home in Gillette on November 26, 2011, aged 82. Governor Matt Mead ordered the Wyoming state flag to be flown at half-staff on November 30, 2011, to commemorate Gilbertz.
