= Dean T. Prosser =

American politician

Member of the Wyoming House of Representatives
- In office 1971–1982

Personal details
- Born: May 10, 1917 Cheyenne, Wyoming, U.S.
- Died: September 24, 2007 (aged 90)
- Party: Republican
- Education: University of Colorado Boulder

Dean T. Prosser (May 10, 1917 – September 24, 2007) was an American politician. He served as a Republican member of the Wyoming House of Representatives.

== Life and career ==
Prosser was born in Cheyenne, Wyoming to Dean and Dorothy Prosser. He attended Cheyenne Central High School and the University of Colorado Boulder where he graduated with a Business Administration degree in 1939. He married Harriot Ann McSween in 1940 and together they had three children.

Prosser served in the Wyoming House of Representatives from 1971 to 1982. He served on a number of committees including Agriculture, Public Lands and Water Resources, Mines, Minerals and Industrial Development, Transportation and Highways, and Rules and Procedures He stood for re-election in 1982 but lost due to a Democratic sweep with only one Republican in the nine elected and with Prosser coming 14th.

Prosser died on September 24, 2007, at the age of 90.
