= Gail D. Zimmerman =

American politician (1933–2025)

Member of the Wyoming Senate
- In office October 20, 1989 – 1999 Serving with Charles Scott, Daniel B. Sullivan, Diemer True
- Preceded by: Thomas F. Stroock
- Constituency: Natrona County (1989-1992); 27th district (1993-1999)

Member of the Wyoming House of Representatives from the Natrona County district
- In office January 8, 1985 – October 20, 1989

Personal details
- Born: February 9, 1933 Dodge City, Kansas, U.S.
- Died: July 30, 2025 (aged 92)
- Party: Republican
- Spouse(s): Lois (died 1975) Anne Templeton (m. 1980; died 2004)
- Children: 4
- Education: Wauneta High School; Nebraska State College; University of Wyoming (BA, PhD); University of Montana (MA)
- Profession: Politician, academic

Military service
- Allegiance: United States
- Branch/service: United States Army

Gail D. Zimmerman (February 9, 1933 – July 30, 2025) was an American politician and academic from Casper, Wyoming, who served in both chambers of the Wyoming Legislature, representing Natrona County as a Republican in the Wyoming House of Representatives from 1985 to 1989 and the Wyoming Senate from 1989 to 1999.

== Early life and education ==
Zimmerman was born in Dodge City, Kansas, on February 9, 1933. After finishing high school, he served in the United States Army during the Korean War, though did not finish his training prior to the cease-fire.

Zimmerman received his undergraduate while living in Nebraska, obtaining a Bachelor of Arts from the University of Wyoming. After returning home from the army, he attended the University of Montana and obtained a Master of Arts before returning to the University of Wyoming for a PhD in physiology and microbiology. Zimmerman also obtained degrees from Wauneta High School and Nebraska State College.

After teaching for many years, Zimmerman obtained an education in brokering.

== Career ==
Zimmerman represented Natrona County as a Republican in both chambers of the Wyoming Legislature. He served in the Wyoming House of Representatives from 1985 to 1989 and the Wyoming Senate from 1989 to 1999. (Note: According to the Wyoming Legislature, Zimmerman served in the Wyoming House of Representatives from 1985 to 1988 and the Wyoming Senate from 1989 to 1998.)

On October 20, 1989, Zimmerman resigned from his seat in the Wyoming House of Representatives after being appointed to replace Thomas F. Stroock in the 50th Wyoming Legislature, following Stroock being named the United States ambassador to Guatemala.

After the state legislature switched from a county-based apportionment system to a district based apportionment system, in 1992, Zimmerman was elected to represent the 27th senate district.

During his time in office, Zimmerman served on the standing committee of Revenue, in addition to the following committees.

- House Education Committee (1985–1988)
- House Corporations, Elections and Political Subdivisions Committee (1985–1988)
- Senate Appropriations Committee (1989–1992)
- Senate Corporations, Elections and Political Subdivisions Committee (1993–1996)

Outside of politics, Zimmerman was the director of the Werner Wildlife Museum and Wyoming State Wastewater Training Center, chairman and CEO of the Wyoming Employee Resource Capital & Service, and trustee of the John Templeton Foundation as well as the Zimmerman Family Foundation.

== Personal life and death ==
After retiring from politics, Zimmerman worked in philanthropy and civic organizations in Wyoming that promote marksmanship, hunting, and conservation.

Zimmerman met his future wife, Lois, while in the service. They had four children together. Following Lois's death in 1975, Zimmerman married Anne Templeton, a surgeon. Anne died in 2004.

Zimmerman died on July 30, 2025, at the age of 92.

== Honors and awards ==
In 2019, Zimmerman was honored by St. Anthony Tri-Parish Catholic School for his contributions and work in the community.

== Notes ==
Wyoming House of Representatives
| Preceded by — | Member of the Wyoming House of Representatives from the Natrona County district 1985–1989 | Succeeded by — |
Wyoming Senate
| Preceded by Thomas F. Stroock | Member of the Wyoming Senate from the 27th district 1989–1999; Served alongside: Charles Scott, Daniel B. Sullivan, Diemer True | Succeeded by — |
