= Robert J. Reese =

American politician (1947–2020)

Member of the Wyoming Senate from the Sweetwater County district
- In office 1985–1993

Personal details
- Born: Robert Jenkins Reese; June 2, 1947 Lovell, Wyoming
- Died: February 7, 2020 (aged 72) Rock Springs, Wyoming
- Party: Democratic
- Education: Harvard College (BA); University of Wyoming (JD)
- Occupation: Attorney

Robert J. Reese (June 2, 1947 – February 7, 2020) was American politician and lawyer in the state of Wyoming. He served in the Wyoming Senate from 1985 to 1993. He was a member of the Democratic Party.
