= Mary C. MacGuire =

Wyoming politician

Member of the Wyoming Senate from the 28th district
- In office 1993–1994

Personal details
- Party: Republican

Mary C. MacGuire is an American Republican politician from Natrona County, Wyoming. She represented the 28th district in the Wyoming Senate from 1993 to 1994.
