= Bob LaLonde =

American politician

Bob Lalonde

Member of the Wyoming Senate
- In office 1989–1994

Personal details
- Born: December 1, 1922 Bay City, Michigan, U.S.
- Died: November 11, 2015 (aged 92) Jackson, Wyoming, U.S.
- Party: Republican
- Spouse: Betty LaLonde (m. 1943–2015)
- Occupation: Airport manager

Robert F. "Bob" LaLonde (December 1, 1922 – November 11, 2015) was a Republican Party member of the Wyoming State Senate. He attended the University of Oregon and was an airport manager, former United States Air Force officer, and a Wyoming county commissioner. He and his wife, Betty, celebrated their 74th wedding anniversary on August 2, 2015.
