= Diemer True =

American politician

Member of the Wyoming House of Representatives
- In office 1973–1977

Member of the Wyoming Senate
- In office 1977–1993

Personal details
- Born: February 12, 1946 (age 80) Cody, Wyoming, U.S.
- Party: Republican
- Spouse: Susie True
- Children: 4
- Education: Northwestern University

Diemer True (born February 12, 1946) is an American politician in the state of Wyoming. He served in the Wyoming House of Representatives and Wyoming Senate as a member of the Republican Party.

He attended Northwestern University. True served as President of the Wyoming Senate from 1991 to 1993.

True also served in a variety of roles in the Wyoming State Republican Party, including state chairman and national committeeman. He was chairman of the Independent Petroleum Association of America (IPAA) from 2001 to 2003, and was recognized with the annual Chief Roughneck award for career contribution to the domestic energy industry in 2008.
