= John Rankine (Wyoming politician) =

American politician

Member of the Wyoming House of Representatives
- In office 1987–1992

Member of the Wyoming Senate
- In office ???–1993

Personal details
- Born: September 27, 1923 Thermopolis, Wyoming, U.S.
- Died: July 25, 1996 (aged 72)
- Party: Republican
- Spouse(s): Elaine Moore (m. 1948, divorced) Clara Fox (m. 1963)

John Rankine (September 27, 1923 – July 25, 1996) was an American politician. He served as a Republican member of the Wyoming House of Representatives and the Wyoming Senate.

== Life and career ==
Rankine was born in Thermopolis, Wyoming, the son of Jeannie Anderson and Robert Rankine. He attended Washakie County High School.

In 1987, Rankine was elected to the Wyoming House of Representatives, serving until 1992. He was also elected to the Wyoming Senate, resigning in 1993.

Rankine died in July 1996, at the age of 72.
