= James L. Applegate =

American politician (1931–2016)

Minority Leader of the Wyoming Senate
- In office 1995–1996

Member of the Wyoming Senate from the 8th district
- In office January 10, 1989 – 1997
- Succeeded by: E. Jayne Mockler

Personal details
- Born: June 9, 1931 Torrington, Wyoming, U.S.
- Died: October 5, 2016 (aged 85) Cheyenne, Wyoming, U.S.
- Party: Democratic
- Spouse: Lynn
- Children: 2
- Education: Torrington High School; University of Notre Dame; University of Wyoming College of Law (LLB)
- Profession: Politician, lawyer

Military service
- Allegiance: United States
- Branch/service: United States Marine Corps
- Years of service: 1953–1955
- Rank: Second lieutenant

James L. Applegate (June 9, 1931 – October 5, 2016) was an American politician and lawyer who served in the Wyoming Senate from 1989 to 1997, representing the 8th district as a Democrat in the 50th, 51st, 52nd, and 53rd Wyoming Legislatures. He served as Senate Minority Leader from 1995 to 1996.

== Early life and education ==
Applegate was born in Torrington, Wyoming, on June 9, 1931, to L.G. "Red" Applegate and Lucille Applegate. He graduated from Torrington High School in 1949. He attended the University of Notre Dame, graduating in 1953 with a degree. Applegate then attended the University of Wyoming College of Law, graduating with a Bachelor of Laws degree in 1958.

== Career ==
Applegate was a United States Marine Corps veteran, serving on active duty as second lieutenant from 1953 to 1955.

Applegate was Assistant City Attorney for Cheyenne from 1959 to 1962. He also served on positions for various other organizations, including the Board of Public Utilities, the Cheyenne Symphony Foundation, the State Board of Law Examiners, the Urban Renewal Advisory Committee, and the Wyoming Retirement State Board.

Applegate was a founder of the law firm Hirst & Applegate.

Applegate served two terms in the Wyoming Senate, representing the 8th district of Wyoming as a Democrat from 1989 to 1997. (Note: According to the Wyoming Legislature, Applegate served from 1989 to 1996.) He served as Senate Minority Leader from 1995 to 1996.

During his time in office, Applegate served on the Community Development Authority and the Board of Law Examiners. He also served on the Management Council and the Select Water Committee from 1993 to 1996. Additionally, Applegate served on the following standing committees:

- Agriculture, Public Lands and Water Resources (1989–1992)
- Journal (1989–1990)
- Labor and Federal Relations (1989–1990)
- Corporations, Elections and Political Subdivisions (1991–1996)
- Revenue (1993–1996)
- Rules and Procedures (1995–1996)

== Awards and honors ==
Applegate was named Person of the Year by the Greater Cheyenne Chamber of Commerce in 1988. He received the Community Spirit Award from the Wyoming Tribune Eagle in 2011.

== Personal life and death ==
Applegate had a wife and two children.

Throughout the course of his life, Applegate volunteered for United Way, Meals on Wheels, and Habitat for Humanity.

Applegate died at the age of 85 in Cheyenne, Wyoming, on October 5, 2016.

== Notes ==
Wyoming Senate
Preceded by —	Member of the Wyoming Senate from the 8th district 1989–1997	Succeeded by —
Wyoming Senate
Preceded by —	Minority Leader of the Wyoming Senate; 1995–1996	Succeeded by —
