= Richard R. Larson (Wyoming politician) =

American politician

Member of the Wyoming House of Representatives
- In office 1978–1979

Member of the Wyoming Senate
- In office 1981–1989

Personal details
- Born: Richard Randall Larson; July 6, 1928 Albin, Wyoming, U.S.
- Died: October 2, 2016 (aged 88) Cheyenne, Wyoming, U.S.
- Party: Republican
- Occupation: Farmer

Richard Randall Larson (July 6, 1928 – October 2, 2016) was an American politician in the state of Wyoming. He served in the Wyoming House of Representatives and Wyoming Senate as a member of the Republican. He attended Ottawa University and was a farmer.
