= Carrol Orrison =

American politician

Member of the Wyoming House of Representatives
- In office 1975–1981

Personal details
- Born: May 19, 1929 Sapulpa, Oklahoma, U.S.
- Died: December 25, 2016 (aged 87) Sapulpa, Oklahoma, U.S.
- Party: Democratic
- Occupation: Wholesale distributor

Carrol P. Orrison (May 19, 1929 – December 25, 2016) was an American politician in the state of Wyoming. He served in the Wyoming House of Representatives as a member of the Democratic Party. He attended the University of Wyoming and Allen University, and was a brewery owner and wholesale distributor. He owned Casper Beverage in Casper and Orrison Distributing. He died on December 25, 2016.
