= Russell Zimmer =

American politician (1926–2024)

Russell William Zimmer

Member of the Wyoming State Senate
- In office 1977–1992

Member of the Wyoming House of Representatives
- In office 1973–1977

Personal details
- Born: February 27, 1926 Minatare, Nebraska, U.S.
- Died: July 12, 2024 (aged 98) Torrington, Wyoming, U.S.
- Party: Republican
- Occupation: Businessman

Russell William Zimmer (February 27, 1926 – July 12, 2024) was an American politician in the state of Wyoming. He served in the Wyoming State Senate and Wyoming House of Representatives as a member of the Republican Party.

Zimmer served as President of the Wyoming Senate from 1989 to 1991. He worked in the grain and livestock business.

Zimmer died at his home on July 12, 2024, at the age of 98.
