= Robert H. Trent =

American politician

Robert H. Trent (May 22, 1936 – April 5, 2012) was an American politician and mining engineer.

Born in Pittsburg, Kansas, Trent received his bachelor's and master's degrees in mining engineering from University of Utah and his doctorate degree in mining economics from Colorado School of Mines. He was involved in the mining industry and taught at several universities including University of Alaska Fairbanks where he was the dean of the school of mining engineering. In 1993, Trent served briefly in the Wyoming State Senate as a Republican. He died of cancer in Scottsdale, Arizona.
