= 68th Wyoming Legislature =

Term of state legislature in Wyoming, US

←	67th	69th (future)	→

Overview
- Legislative body: Wyoming Legislature
- Jurisdiction: Wyoming, United States
- Meeting place: Wyoming State Capitol
- Term: January 14, 2025–January 11, 2026

Wyoming Senate
- Members: 31 senators
- Senate President: Bo Biteman
- Majority Leader: Tara Nethercott
- Minority Leader: Mike Gierau
- Party control: Republican

Wyoming House of Representatives
- Members: 62 representatives
- Speaker of the House: Chip Neiman
- Majority Leader: Scott Heiner
- Minority Leader: Mike Yin
- Party control: Republican
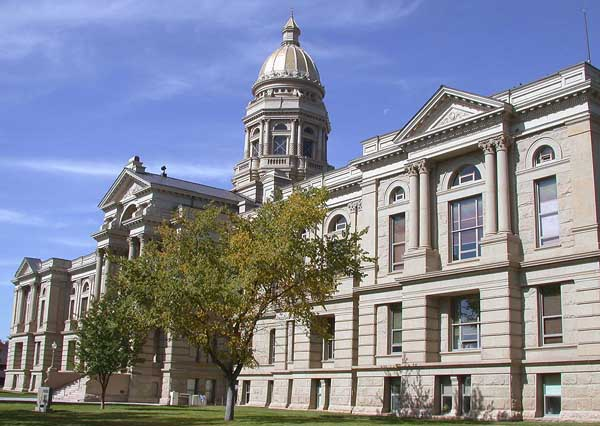

The 68th Wyoming Legislature is the current meeting of the Wyoming Legislature which first convened on January 14, 2025. Republicans currently have supermajorities in both chambers.

== Major legislation ==
=== Enacted ===
- March 18, 2025: Sanctuary Cities, Counties and State – Prohibition, HB 133
- March 14, 2025: What is a Woman Act, HB 32 (Enacted without signature)
- March 4, 2025: Steamboat Legacy Scholarship Act, HB 199
- February 28 2025: Driver's Licenses – Unauthorized Alien Restrictions, HB 116
- February 27, 2025: Repeal Gun Free Zones and Preemption Amendments, HB 172 (Enacted without signature)
- February 27, 2025: Regulation of Surgical Abortions, HB 42

=== Not enacted ===
==== Passed by both chambers ====
- March 4, 2025: Chemical Abortions – Ultrasound Requirement HB 64 (Vetoed)

==== Passed by one chamber ====
- March 3, 2025: Homeowner Tax Exemption – 2025 and 2026, HB 169 (Died in Senate Appropriations Committee)

==== Have not passed ====
- March 4, 2025: Runoff Elections, HB 249
- March 3, 2025: Make Carbon Dioxide Great Again – No Net Zero, SF 92 (Died in Senate Minerals Committee)
- March 3, 2025: Individual Right to Privacy – Constitutional Amendment, SJ 9 (Died in Senate Judiciary Committee)
- March 3, 2025: Prohibition on Electronic Voting Equipment, HB 215 (Died in House Corporations Committee)

== Composition ==
The below members, unless otherwise noted, were elected in the 2022 and 2024 general elections. Members in gray took office in January 2025.

=== Senate ===
==== Leadership ====
Position	Name	Party	District
President of the Senate	Bo Biteman	Rep	SD 21
Majority Leader	Tara Nethercott	Rep	SD 4
Senate Vice President	Tim Salazar	Rep	SD 26
Minority Leader	Mike Gierau	Dem	SD 17
Minority Whip	Chris Rothfuss	Dem	SD 9
Source...

==== List of members ====
District	Party	Senator	Residence	First elected
SD 1	Republican	Ogden Driskill	Devils Tower	2010
SD 2	Republican	Brian Boner	Douglas	2015 (appt.); 2016
SD 3	Republican	Cheri Steinmetz	Lingle	2018
SD 4	Republican	Tara Nethercott	Cheyenne	2016
SD 5	Republican	Lynn Hutchings	Cheyenne	2018
SD 6	Republican	Darin Smith	Cheyenne	2024
SD 7	Republican	Stephan Pappas	Cheyenne	2014
SD 8	Republican	Jared Olsen	Cheyenne	2024
SD 9	Democratic	Chris Rothfuss	Laramie	2010
SD 10	Republican	Gary Crum	Laramie	2024
SD 11	Republican	Larry S. Hicks	Baggs	2010
SD 12	Republican	John Kolb	Rock Springs	2020
SD 13	Republican	Stacy Jones	Rock Springs	2022
SD 14	Republican	Laura Taliaferro Pearson	Kemmerer	2024
SD 15	Republican	Wendy Davis Schuler	Evanston	2018
SD 16	Republican	Dan Dockstader	Afton	2008
SD 17	Democratic	Mike Gierau	Jackson	2018
SD 18	Republican	Tim French	Powell	2020
SD 19	Republican	Dan Laursen	Powell	2022
SD 20	Republican	Ed Cooper	Ten Sleep	2020
SD 21	Republican	Bo Biteman	Ranchester	2018
SD 22	Republican	Barry Crago	Buffalo	2024
SD 23	Republican	Eric Barlow	Gillette	2022
SD 24	Republican	Troy McKeown	Gillette	2020
SD 25	Republican	Cale Case	Lander	1998
SD 26	Republican	Tim Salazar	Riverton	2020
SD 27	Republican	Bill Landen	Casper	2006
SD 28	Republican	James Lee Anderson	Casper	2012
SD 29	Republican	Bob Ide	Casper	2022
SD 30	Republican	Charles Scott	Casper	1982
SD 31	Republican	Evie Brennan	Cheyenne	2022

==== Committees ====
Committee chairmen are listed first and in boldface.

Wyoming Senate committees
Committee	Majority	Minority
Judiciary	**Jared Olsen, SD 8** Barry Crago, SD 22; Gary Crum, SD 10; Larry S. Hicks, SD 11; John Kolb, SD 12	
Appropriations	**Tim Salazar, SD 26**; Ogden Driskill, SD 1 Dan Laursen, SD 19; Darin Smith, SD 6	Mike Gierau, SD 17
Revenue	**Troy McKeown, SD 24**; Cale Case, SD 25; Tim French, SD 18; Bob Ide, SD 29; Stephan Pappas, SD 7	
Education	**Wendy Davis Schuler, SD 15**; Evie Brennan, SD 31; Bill Landen, SD 27; Jared Olsen, SD 8 Charlie Scott, SD 30	
Agriculture	**Tim French, SD 18**; Barry Crago, SD 22; Bob Ide, SD 29; Troy McKeown, SD 24; Laura Taliaferro Pearson, SD 14	
Travel, Recreation, Wildlife & Cultural; Resources	**Bill Landen, SD 27**; Brian Boner, SD 2 Larry S. Hicks, SD 11; Stacy Jones, SD 13; Wendy Davis Schuler, SD 15	
Corporations, Elections, & Political; Subdivisions	**Cale Case, SD 25**; Brian Boner, SD 2 Dan Dockstader, SD 16; Cheri Steinmetz, SD 3	Chris Rothfuss, SD 9
Transportation, Highways, & Military; Affairs	**Stephan Pappas, SD 7** James Lee Anderson, SD 1 Evie Brennan, SD 31; Ed Cooper, SD 20; John Kolb, SD 12	
Minerals, Business, & Economic; Development	**James Lee Anderson, SD 1** Ed Cooper, SD 20; Stacy Jones, SD 13; Tara Nethercott, SD 4	Chris Rothfuss, SD 9
Labor, Health, & Social; Services	**Eric Barlow, SD 23**; Gary Crum, SD 10; Lynn Hutchings, SD 5 Charlie Scott, SD 30; Cheri Steinmetz, SD 3	

Bo Biteman from SD 21 was not placed on any Senate committee, he was instead elected as Senate President.

=== House of Representatives ===
==== Leadership ====
Position	Name	Party	District
Speaker of the House	Chip Neiman	Rep	HD 1
Majority Leader	Scott Heiner	Rep	HD 18
Speaker pro tempore	Jeremy Haroldson	Rep	HD 4
Majority Whip	Ocean Andrew	Rep	HD 46
Minority Leader	Mike Yin	Dem	HD 16
Minority Whip	Karlee Provenza	Dem	HD 45
Minority Caucus Chairman	Trey Sherwood	Dem	HD 14
Source...

==== List of members ====
District	Party	Representative	Residence	First elected
HD 1	Republican	Chip Neiman	Hulett	2020
HD 2	Republican	J. D. Williams	Lusk	2021 (appt.); 2024
HD 3	Republican	Abby Angelos	Gillette	2022
HD 4	Republican	Jeremy Haroldson	Wheatland	2020
HD 5	Republican	Scott Smith	Lingle	2022
HD 6	Republican	Tomi Strock	Douglas	2022
HD 7	Republican	Bob Nicholas	Cheyenne	2010
HD 8	Republican	Steve Johnson	Cheyenne	2024
HD 9	Republican	Landon Brown	Cheyenne	2016
HD 10	Republican	John Eklund Jr.	Cheyenne	2010
HD 11	Republican	Jacob Wasserburger	Cheyenne	2024
HD 12	Republican	Clarence Styvar	Cheyenne	2018
HD 13	Democratic	Ken Chestek	Laramie	2022
HD 14	Democratic	Trey Sherwood	Laramie	2020
HD 15	Republican	Pam Thayer	Rawlins	2024
HD 16	Democratic	Mike Yin	Jackson	2018
HD 17	Republican	J.T. Larson	Rock Springs	2022
HD 18	Republican	Scott Heiner	Green River	2020
HD 19	Republican	Joe Webb	Lyman	2024
HD 20	Republican	Mike Schmid	La Bargé	2024
HD 21	Republican	McKay Erickson	Afton	2024
HD 22	Republican	Andrew Byron	Jackson	2022
HD 23	Democratic	Liz Storer	Jackson	2022
HD 24	Republican	Nina Webber	Cody	2024
HD 25	Republican	Paul Hoeft	Powell	2024
HD 26	Republican	Dalton Banks	Cowley	2022
HD 27	Republican	Martha Lawley	Worland	2022
HD 28	Republican	John Winter	Thermopolis	2018
HD 29	Republican	Ken Pendergraft	Sheridan	2022
HD 30	Republican	Tom Kelly	Sheridan	2024
HD 31	Republican	John Bear	Gillette	2020
HD 32	Republican	Ken Clouston	Gillette	2022
HD 33	Democratic	Ivan Posey	Fort Washakie	2024
HD 34	Republican	Pepper Ottman	Riverton	2020
HD 35	Republican	Tony Locke	Casper	2022
HD 36	Republican	Art Washut	Casper	2018
HD 37	Republican	Steve Harshman	Casper	2002
HD 38	Republican	Jayme Lien	Casper	2024
HD 39	Republican	Cody Wylie	Rock Springs	2022
HD 40	Republican	Marilyn Connolly	Buffalo	2024
HD 41	Republican	Gary Brown	Cheyenne	2024
HD 42	Republican	Rob Geringer	Cheyenne	2024
HD 43	Republican	Ann Lucas	Cheyenne	2024
HD 44	Republican	Lee Filer	Cheyenne	2012; 2024
HD 45	Democratic	Karlee Provenza	Laramie	2020
HD 46	Republican	Ocean Andrew	Laramie	2020
HD 47	Republican	Bob Davis	Baggs	2022
HD 48	Republican	Darin McCann	Rock Springs	2024
HD 49	Republican	Robert Wharff	Evanston	2020; 2024
HD 50	Republican	Rachel Rodriguez-Williams	Cody	2020
HD 51	Republican	Laurie Bratten	Sheridan	2024
HD 52	Republican	Reuben Tarver	Gillette	2022
HD 53	Republican	Chris Knapp	Gillette	2020 (appt.); 2022
HD 54	Republican	Lloyd Larsen	Lander	2012
HD 55	Republican	Joel Guggenmos	Riverton	2024
HD 56	Republican	Elissa Campbell	Casper	2024
HD 57	Republican	Julie Jarvis	Casper	2024
HD 58	Republican	Bill Allemand	Midwest	2022
HD 59	Republican	J.R. Riggins	Casper	2024
HD 60	Republican	Marlene Brady	Green River	2024
HD 61	Republican	Daniel Singh	Cheyenne	2022
HD 62	Republican	Kevin Campbell	Glenrock	2024

==== Committees ====
Committee chairmen are listed first and in boldface.

Wyoming House of Representatives committees
Committee	Majority	Minority
Judiciary	**Art Washut, HD 36**; Marlene Brady, HD 60; Laurie Bratten, HD 51; Lee Filer, HD 44; Tom Kelly, HD 30; Jayme Lien, HD 38; Daniel Singh, HD 61; Joe Webb, HD 19	Ken Chestek, HD 13
Appropriations	**John Bear, HD 31**; Bill Allemand, HD 58; Abby Angelos, HD 3 Jeremy Haroldson, HD 4 Ken Pendergraft, HD 29; Scott Smith, HD 5	Trey Sherwood, HD 14
Revenue	**Tony Locke, HD 35**; Gary Brown, HD 41; Kevin Campbell, HD 62; Jayme Lien, HD 38; Ann Lucas, HD 43; J.R. Riggins, HD 59; Clarence Styvar, HD 12; Robert Wharff, HD 49	Liz Storer, HD 23
Education	**Ocean Andrew, HD 46**; Laurie Bratten, HD 51; McKay Erickson, HD 21; Joel Guggenmos, HD 55; Tom Kelly, HD 30; Martha Lawley, HD 27; Daniel Singh, HD 61; Tomi Strock, HD 6 JD Williams, HD 2	
Agriculture, State & Public; Lands & Water; Resources	**John Winter, HD 28**; Dalton Banks, HD 26; Bob Davis, HD 47; John Eklund Jr., HD 10; Steve Johnson, HD 8 Pepper Ottman, HD 34; Mike Schmid, HD 20; Tomi Strock, HD 6	Karlee Provenza, HD 45
Travel, Recreation, Wildlife & Cultural; Resources	**Andrew Byron, HD 22**; Elissa Campbell, HD 56; Marilyn Connolly, HD 40; Steve Harshman, HD 37; Julie Jarvis, HD 57; Pam Thayer, HD 15; Robert Wharff, HD 49	Karlee Provenza, HD 45; Liz Storer, HD 23
Corporations, Elections & Political; Subdivisions	**Christopher Knapp, HD 53**; Gary Brown, HD 41; Paul Hoeft, HD 25; Steve Johnson, HD 8 Tony Locke, HD 35; Ann Lucas, HD 43; Joe Webb, HD 19; Nina Webber, HD 24	Mike Yin, HD 16
Transportation, Highways & Military; Affairs	**Landon Brown, HD 9** Dalton Banks, HD 26; Rob Geringer, HD 42; Lloyd Larsen, HD 54; Darin McCann, HD 48; Bob Nicholas, HD 7 Reuben Tarver, HD 52; Cody Wylie, HD 39	Ivan Posey, HD 33
Minerals, Business & Economic; Development	**Scott Heiner, HD 18**; Kevin Campbell, HD 62; Christopher Knapp, HD 53; J.T. Larson, HD 17; Martha Lawley, HD 27; J.R. Riggins, HD 59; Mike Schmid, HD 20; Reuben Tarver, HD 52; Nina Webber, HD 24	
Labor, Health & Social; Services	**Rachel Rodriguez-Williams, HD 50**; Ken Clouston, HD 32; Joel Guggenmos, HD 55; Paul Hoeft, HD 25; Darin McCann, HD 48; Pepper Ottman, HD 34; Clarence Styvar, HD 12; Jacob Wasserburger, HD 11	Mike Yin, HD 16

Chip Neiman from HD 21 was not placed on any House committee, he was instead elected as Speaker of the House.

== Freedom Caucus takeover ==
Map of caucus membership in the 68th House. Map is an approximation based on primary endorsements, as the Freedom Caucus does not release membership lists. Freedom Caucus endorsees Freedom Caucus ally Other Republicans Democrats

Caucus membership in the 68th House.
1. Freedom Caucus, 34 (55.0%)
2. Other Republicans, 22 (35.0%)
3. Democrats, 6 (10.0%)

The 2024 Wyoming House of Representatives election saw victories in primaries for hard-right Republican members of the Wyoming Freedom Caucus, increasing their seat share from twenty-eight to thirty-four, a simple majority in the sixty-two seat chamber, in what was the first takeover of any legislature by a state Freedom Caucus. Members there were assigned a large majority of committee chairs for the 68th Legislature. In the Wyoming Senate, however, the caucus's influence is much less pronounced, and more traditional Republicans hold a majority. The caucus condemned the lack of Freedom Caucus chairmen in the Senate, stating "We are troubled by the committee assignments in the Senate, where an overwhelming majority of committees are controlled by Liz Cheney Republicans."

== See also ==
- List of Wyoming state legislatures
