= 2026 Wyoming Senate election =

2026 Wyoming State Senate election
- November 3, 2026

17 of the 31 seats in the Wyoming Senate (odd-numbered seats and one special election) 16 seats needed for a majority
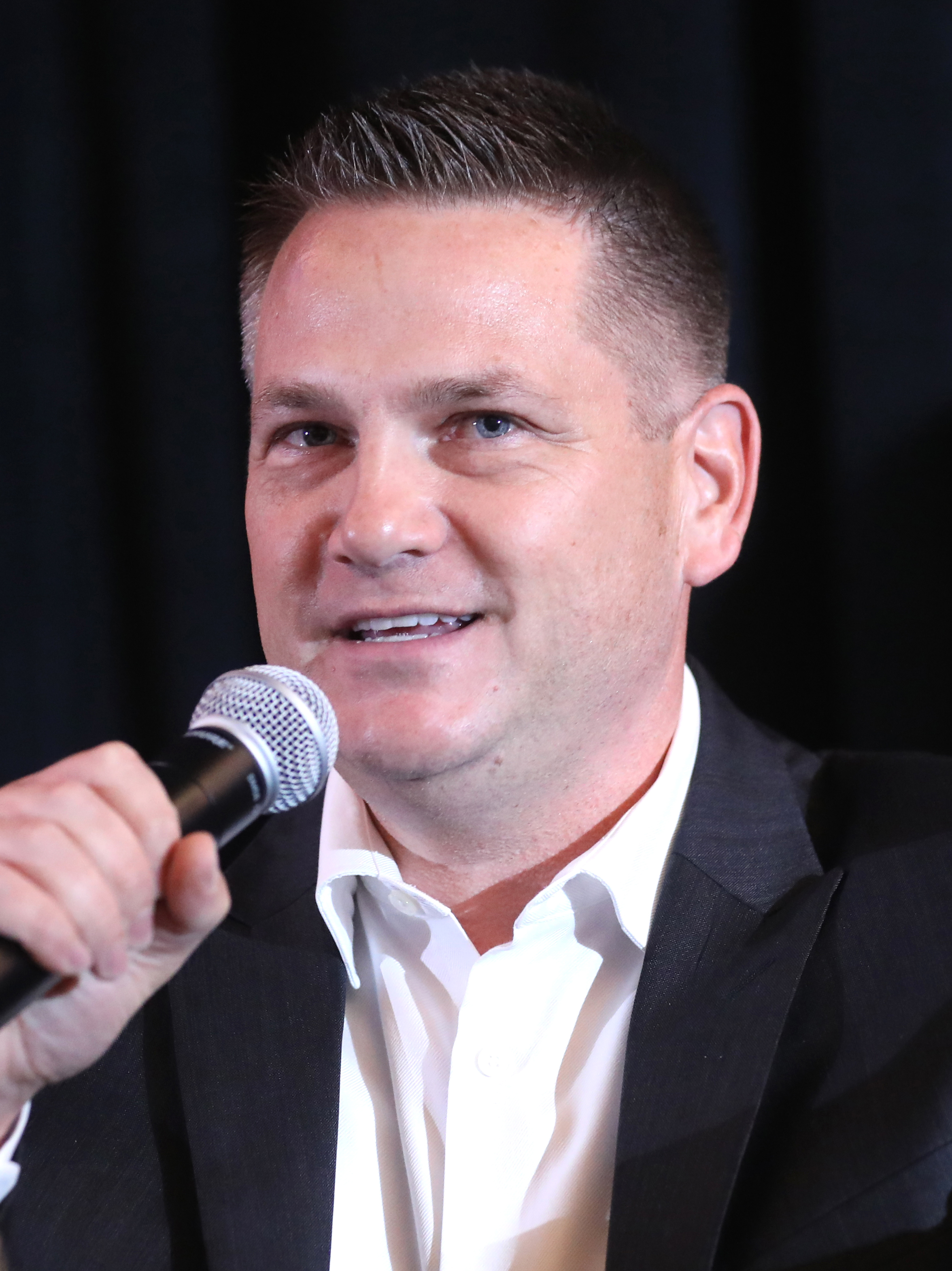

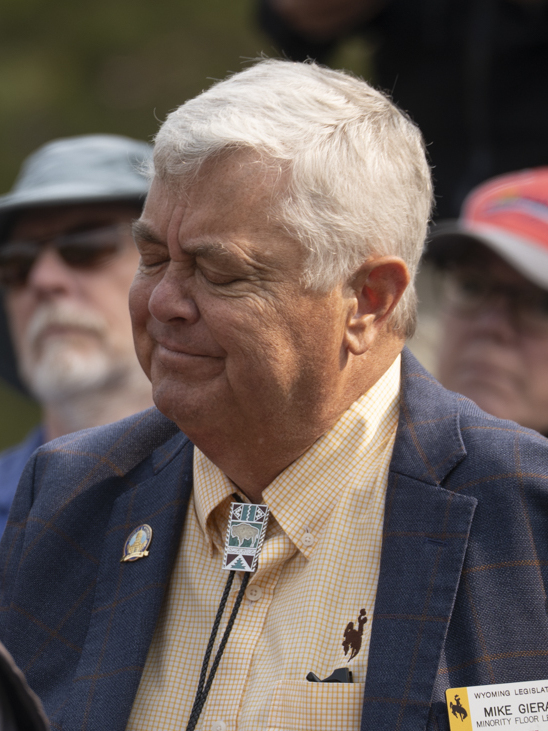
	Majority party	Minority party
Leader	Bo Biteman (retiring)	Mike Gierau
Party	Republican	Democratic
Leader since	January 14, 2025	January 14, 2025
Leader's seat	21st–Ranchester	17th–Jackson
Last election	15 seats, 89.78%	0 seats, 6.61%
Seats before	29	2
2022 gen.	14 seats, 75.31%	2 seats, 17.28%
Seats up	15	2
- Republican incumbent Republican incumbent retiring Democratic incumbent No election
President of the Senate before election
Bo Biteman
Republican
Elected President of the Senate
Bo Biteman
Republican

The 2026 Wyoming Senate election was held on November 3, 2026, to elect members of the Wyoming Legislature for the 69th Wyoming Legislature. Partisan primaries were held on August 18, 2026. Part of the 2026 United States elections, the election was held alongside races for state house of representatives, U.S. House, and U.S. Senate.

== Background ==
Both primary and general elections in the state use a plurality voting system to select candidates. Also known as first-past-the-post, a candidate only needs to win the most votes out of any candidate and does not need to attain an outright majority. Wyoming utilizes closed primaries, in which voters must be registered members of a political party to participate in a primary election. Voters have until 96 days before the primary to do so. Some Republican legislators have introduced a bill to create runoff elections for primaries, but has not succeeded.

== Retirements ==
=== Republicans ===
1. District 5: Lynn Hutchings is retiring
2. District 7: Stephan Pappas is retiring
3. District 11: Larry S. Hicks is retiring
4. District 19: Dan Laursen is retiring
5. District 21: Bo Biteman is retiring to run for Congress.
6. District 23: Eric Barlow is retiring to run for governor.
7. District 27: Bill Landen is retiring

== Incumbents defeated ==
=== In primary elections ===
==== Republicans ====
1. District 29: Bob Ide lost renomination to Lisa Engebretsen.

== Predictions ==
Source	Ranking	As of
Sabato's Crystal Ball	Safe R	January 22, 2026
State Navigate	Safe R	October 24, 2026

== Summary by district ==
† = incumbent who did not seek re-election
Italics = non-incumbent
Bold = district flipped from one party to the other

District	Incumbent	Party	Elected Senator	Party
1st	Ogden Driskill	Rep	Ogden Driskill	Rep
3rd	Cheri Steinmetz	Rep	Cheri Steinmetz	Rep
5th	Lynn Hutchings†	Rep	Lauren Schoenfeld	Rep
6th sp	Taft Love (Note: Replacing Darin Smith, who was elected in 2024 and resigned on August 11, 2025)	Rep	Taft Love	Rep
7th	Stephan Pappas†	Rep	Mark Rinne	Rep
9th	Chris Rothfuss	Dem	Chris Rothfuss	Dem
11th	Larry S. Hicks†	Rep	Bob Davis	Rep
13th	Stacy Jones	Rep	Stacy Jones	Rep
15th	Wendy Davis Schuler	Rep	Wendy Davis Schuler	Rep
17th	Mike Gierau	Dem	Mike Gierau	Dem
19th	Dan Laursen†	Rep	R. J. Kost	Rep
21st	Bo Biteman†	Rep	Melissa Butcher	Rep
23rd	Eric Barlow†	Rep	Abby Angelos	Rep
25th	Cale Case	Rep	Cale Case	Rep
27th	Bill Landen†	Rep	Kevin Helling	Rep
29th	Bob Ide	Rep	Lisa Engebretsen	Rep
31st	Evie Brennan	Rep	Evie Brennan	Rep

== By district ==
=== District 1 ===
Wyoming Senate District 1 is located in the northeastern corner of Wyoming, representing the entirety of Crook County and portions of Campbell and Weston counties. House Districts 1 and 52 are nested within SD 1. It has been represented by Republican Ogden Driskill since his election in 2010. He won re-election in the 2022 general election with 75.18% of the vote with significant write-in opposition, he only won renomination in the Republican primary with a plurality of 39.82% against two opponents.

==== Republican primary ====
===== Candidates =====
====== Declared ======
- Ogden Driskill, incumbent Senator (2011-present)
- Chip Neiman, Speaker of the Wyoming House of Representatives (2025-present)

===== Results =====
Republican primary results
Party	Candidate	Votes	%
Republican	Ogden Driskill (incumbent)	2,923	51.80
Republican	Chip Neiman	2,705	47.93
Write-in		15	0.27
Total votes		5,643	100.00

=== District 3 ===
Wyoming Senate District 3 is located on the western edge of Wyoming, representing the entirety of Goshen and Niobrara counties and a portion of Weston County. House Districts 2 and 5 are nested within SD 3. It has been represented by Republican Cheri Steinmetz since her election in 2018. She won re-election in the 2022 general election unopposed with 96.56% of the vote, winning renomination in the Republican primary with 63.64% of the vote.

==== Republican primary ====
===== Candidates =====
====== Declared ======
- Cheri Steinmetz, incumbent Senator (2019-present)

===== Results =====
Republican primary results
Party	Candidate	Votes	%
Republican	Cheri Steinmetz (incumbent)	4,438	96.88
Write-in		143	3.12
Total votes		4,581	100.00

=== District 5 ===
Wyoming Senate District 5 is located in southeastern Wyoming in the Cheyenne area, representing a portion of Laramie County. House Districts 12 and 42 are nested within SD 5. It has been represented by Republican Lynn Hutchings since her election in 2018. She won re-election in the 2022 general election with 70.58% of the vote against a Democratic opponent, winning renomination in the Republican primary unopposed with 95.99% of the vote.

==== Republican primary ====
===== Candidates =====
====== Declared ======
- Ben Hornok, former member of the Wyoming House of Representatives (2023-2025)
- Lauren Schoenfeld, former Sweetwater County commissioner
- Meagan Harrington
- Ronald McCleary

====== Declined ======
- Lynn Hutchings, incumbent Senator (2019-present)

===== Results =====
Republican primary results
Party	Candidate	Votes	%
Republican	Lauren Schoenfeld	1,252	42.43
Republican	Ben Hornok	1,185	40.16
Republican	Meagan Herrington	373	12.64
Republican	Ronald McCleary	120	4.07
Write-in		21	0.71
Total votes		2,951	100.00

==== Democratic primary ====
===== Candidates =====
====== Declared ======
- Ted Hanlon, solar and wind energy installer

===== Results =====
Democratic primary results
Party	Candidate	Votes	%
Democratic	Ted Hanlon	341	97.71
Write-in		8	2.29
Total votes		349	100.00

=== District 6 ===
Wyoming Senate District 6 is located in southeastern Wyoming, representing Platte County and a portion of Laramie County. House Districts 4 and 10 are nested within SD 6. It has been represented by Republican Taft Love since his appointment in August 2025. Love replaced Senator Darin Smith, who was elected in the 2024 general election unopposed with 95.48% of the vote, winning nomination in the open Republican primary with 37.60% of the vote against five opponents. Smith was appointed United States Attorney for the District of Wyoming on August 11, 2025, and Love, who came in third in the 2024 Republican primary, was appointed to take his place. Ordinarily this seat would be up for election in 2028, but Love's appointment necessitates a special election to take place in 2026. Love has declared his intention to run for re-election.

==== Republican primary ====
===== Candidates =====
====== Declared ======
- Taft Love, incumbent Senator (2025-present)
- Roy Birt, retired postal worker

===== Results =====
Special Republican primary results
Party	Candidate	Votes	%
Republican	Taft Love (incumbent)	2,684	52.52
Republican	Roy Birt	2,394	46.85
Write-in		32	0.63
Total votes		5,110	100.00

=== District 7 ===
Wyoming Senate District 7 is located in southeastern Wyoming in the Cheyenne area, representing a portion of Laramie County. House Districts 9 and 41 are nested within SD 7. It has been represented by Republican Stephan Pappas since his election in 2014. He won re-election in the 2022 general election with 56.82% of the vote against a Democratic opponent, winning renomination in the Republican primary with 51.90% of the vote against two opponents.

==== Republican primary ====
===== Candidates =====
====== Declared ======
- Mark Rinne, Cheyenne city councilor

====== Declined ======
- Stephan Pappas, incumbent Senator (2015-present)

===== Results =====
Republican primary results
Party	Candidate	Votes	%
Republican	Mark Rinne	2,801	93.59
Write-in		192	6.41
Total votes		2,993	100.00

==== Democratic primary ====
===== Candidates =====
====== Declared ======
- Jim Lee

===== Results =====
Democratic primary results
Party	Candidate	Votes	%
Democratic	Jim Lee	613	97.77
Write-in		14	2.23
Total votes		627	100.00

=== District 9 ===
Wyoming Senate District 9 is located in southeastern Wyoming in the city of Laramie, representing a portion of Albany County. House Districts 13 and 45 are nested within SD 9. It has been represented by Democrat Chris Rothfuss since his election in 2010. He won re-election in the 2022 general election with 62.80% of the vote against a Republican opponent, winning renomination in the Democratic primary unopposed with 99.48% of the vote.

==== Democratic primary ====
===== Candidates =====
====== Declared ======
- Chris Rothfuss, incumbent Senator (2011-present)

===== Results =====
Democratic primary results
Party	Candidate	Votes	%
Democratic	Chris Rothfuss (incumbent)	801	99.75
Write-in		2	0.25
Total votes		803	100.00

=== District 11 ===
Wyoming Senate District 11 is located in southern Wyoming, representing the entirety of Carbon County and a portion of Sweetwater County. House Districts 15 and 47 are nested within SD 11. It has been represented by Republican Larry S. Hicks since his election in 2010. He won re-election in the 2022 general election with 78.36% of the vote against a Constitution Party opponent, winning renomination in the Republican primary unopposed with 96.90% of the vote.

==== Republican primary ====
===== Candidates =====
====== Declared ======
- Bob Davis, member of the Wyoming House of Representatives (2023-present)

====== Declined ======
- Larry S. Hicks, incumbent Senator (2011-present)

===== Results =====
Republican primary results
Party	Candidate	Votes	%
Republican	Bob Davis	2,728	98.45
Write-in		43	1.55
Total votes		2,771	100.00

==== Democratic primary ====
===== Candidates =====
====== Declared ======
- Jim Wilson, electrical control operator

===== Results =====
Democratic primary results
Party	Candidate	Votes	%
Democratic	Jim Wilson	297	97.38
Write-in		8	2.62
Total votes		305	100.00

=== District 13 ===
Wyoming Senate District 13 is located in southeastern Wyoming in the Green River–Rock Springs area, representing a portion of Sweetwater County. House Districts 39 and 60 are nested within SD 13. It has been represented by Republican Stacy Jones since the 2022 general election where she defeated a Democratic opponent with 75.76% of the vote. She defeated incumbent senator Tom James in the Republican primary with 67.67% of the vote.

==== Republican primary ====
===== Candidates =====
====== Declared ======
- Stacy Jones, incumbent Senator (2023-present)

===== Results =====
Republican primary results
Party	Candidate	Votes	%
Republican	Stacy Jones (incumbent)	2,489	98.69
Write-in		33	1.31
Total votes		2,522	100.00

=== District 15 ===
Wyoming Senate District 15 is located in southeastern Wyoming, representing a portion of Uinta County. House Districts 19 and 49 are nested within SD 15. It has been represented by Republican Wendy Davis Schuler since her election in 2018. She won re-election in the 2022 general election with 96.45% of the vote, winning renomination in the Republican primary with 61.40% of the vote.

==== Republican Primary ====
===== Candidates =====
====== Declared ======
- Wendy Davis Schuler, incumbent Senator (2019-present)
- Chris Katzl, educator and writer
- Jen Hegeman, Evanston city council member
- Tina Johnson

===== Results =====
Republican primary results
Party	Candidate	Votes	%
Republican	Wendy Davis Schuler (incumbent)	2,551	61.75
Republican	Tina Johnson	1,041	25.20
Republican	Jen Hegeman	350	8.47
Republican	Chris Katzl	184	4.45
Write-in		5	0.12
Total votes		4,131	100.00

=== District 17 ===
Wyoming Senate District 17 is located in northeastern Wyoming, representing a portion of Teton County, the only county that voted for Democratic nominee Kamala Harris in the 2024 presidential election. House Districts 16 and 23 are nested within SD 17. It has been represented by Democrat Mike Gierau since his election in 2018. He won re-election in the 2022 general election with 62.80% against Republican and Libertarian opponents, winning renomination in the Democratic primary unopposed with 97.92% of the vote.

==== Democratic primary ====
===== Candidates =====
====== Declared ======
- Mike Gierau, incumbent Senator (2015-present)

===== Results =====
Democratic primary results
Party	Candidate	Votes	%
Democratic	Mike Gierau (incumbent)	1,200	99.67
Write-in		4	0.33
Total votes		1,204	100.00

=== District 19 ===
Wyoming Senate District 19 is located in northern Wyoming, representing portions of Big Horn and Park counties. House Districts 25 and 26 are nested within SD 19. It has been represented by Republican Dan Laursen since the 2022 general election where he won unopposed with 93.85% of the vote. He defeated incumbent senator R. J. Kost and another opponent in the Republican primary with a plurality of 42.91%.

==== Republican primary ====
===== Candidates =====
====== Declared ======
- Paul Hoeft, member of the Wyoming House of Representatives (2025-present)
- R. J. Kost, former member of the Wyoming Senate (2019-2023)

====== Declined ======
- Dan Laursen, incumbent Senator (2023-present)

===== Results =====
Republican primary results
Party	Candidate	Votes	%
Republican	R. J. Kost	2,752	53.32
Republican	Paul Hoeft	2,395	46.41
Write-in		14	0.27
Total votes		5,161	100.00

=== District 21 ===
Wyoming Senate District 21 is located in northern Wyoming, representing a portion of Sheridan County. SD 21 and 22 are not subject to House District nesting. It has been represented by Republican Bo Biteman since his election in 2018. He won re-election in the 2022 general election with 73.18% of the vote against a Democratic opponent, winning renomination in the Republican primary unopposed with 95.22% of the vote.

==== Republican primary ====
===== Candidates =====
====== Declared ======
- Ken Pendergraft, member of the Wyoming House of Representatives (2023-present)
- Melissa Butcher, small business owner

====== Declined ======
- Bo Biteman, incumbent Senator (2019-present)

===== Results =====
Republican primary results
Party	Candidate	Votes	%
Republican	Melissa Butcher	3,361	58.18
Republican	Ken Pendergraft	2,391	41.39
Write-in		25	0.43
Total votes		5,777	100.00

=== District 23 ===
Wyoming Senate District 23 is located in northeastern Wyoming, representing a portion of Campbell County. House Districts 3 and 31 are nested within SD 23. It has been represented by Republican Eric Barlow since the 2022 general election where he won 72.35% of the vote against an independent opponent. He won the Republican primary with 80.47% of the vote with significant write-in opposition after incumbent senator Jeff Wasserburger did not stand for re-election.

==== Republican primary ====
===== Candidates =====
====== Declared ======
- Abby Angelos, member of the Wyoming House of Representatives (2023-present)
- Dwayne Dillinger, executive director of the Campbell County Parks & Recreation department

====== Declined ======
- Eric Barlow, incumbent Senator (2023-present) (running for governor)
- John Bear, member of the Wyoming House of Representatives (2021-present)

===== Results =====
Republican primary results
Party	Candidate	Votes	%
Republican	Abby Angelos	2,054	55.19
Republican	Dwayne Dillinger	1,657	44.52
Write-in		11	0.30
Total votes		3,722	100.00

=== District 25 ===
Wyoming Senate District 25 is located in central Wyoming, representing a portion of Fremont County. House Districts 33 and 54 are nested within SD 25. It has been represented by Republican Cale Case since his election in 1998. He won re-election in the 2022 general election with 89.01% of the vote with some write-in opposition, winning renomination in the Republican primary with 54.89% of the vote.

==== Republican primary ====
===== Candidates =====
====== Declared ======
- Cale Case, incumbent Senator (1999-present)
- Lisa Wilson

===== Results =====
Republican primary results
Party	Candidate	Votes	%
Republican	Cale Case (incumbent)	2,604	62.78
Republican	Lisa Wilson	1,536	37.03
Write-in		8	0.19
Total votes		4,148	100.00

=== District 27 ===
Wyoming Senate District 27 is located in central Wyoming in the Casper area, representing a portion of Natrona County. House Districts 35 and 36 are nested within SD 27. It has been represented by Republican Bill Landen since his election in 2006. He won re-election in the 2022 general election unopposed with 97.50% of the vote, winning renomination in the Republican primary unopposed with 98.07% of the vote.

==== Republican primary ====
===== Candidates =====
====== Declared ======
- Jim Corkery
- Kevin Helling, surgeon
- Marcia Neumiller, Natrona County Wyoming Republican Party state committeewoman

====== Declined ======
- Bill Landen, incumbent Senator (2007-present)

===== Results =====
Republican primary results
Party	Candidate	Votes	%
Republican	Kevin Helling	1,928	52.97
Republican	Marcia Neumiller	1,093	30.02
Republican	Jim Corkery	612	16.81
Write-in		7	0.19
Total votes		3,640	100.00

=== District 29 ===
Wyoming Senate District 29 is located in central Wyoming in the Casper area, representing a portion of Natrona County. House Districts 37 and 39 are nested within SD 29. It has been represented by Republican Bob Ide since the 2022 general election where he was elected unopposed with 91.44% of the vote with some write-in opposition. He defeated incumbent senator Drew Perkins in the Republican primary with 52.65% of the vote.

==== Republican primary ====
===== Candidates =====
====== Declared ======
- Bob Ide, incumbent Senator (2022-present)
- Lisa Engebretsen, former Casper city councilor

===== Results =====
Republican primary results
Party	Candidate	Votes	%
Republican	Lisa Engebretsen	2,153	52.27
Republican	Bob Ide (incumbent)	1,954	47.44
Write-in		12	0.29
Total votes		4,119	100.00

=== District 31 ===
Wyoming Senate District 31 is located in southeastern Wyoming in the Cheyenne area, representing a portion of Laramie County. House Districts 43 and 61 are nested within SD 31. SD 31 was added after the 2020 redistricting cycle, with Republican Evie Brennan representing the district since its creation. She was first elected in the 2022 general election unopposed with 96.21% of the vote, winning the Republican primary with 56.44% of the vote.

==== Republican primary ====
===== Candidates =====
====== Declared ======
- Evie Brennan, incumbent Senator (2023-present)
- Daniel Singh, member of the Wyoming House of Representatives (2023-present)

===== Results =====
Republican primary results
Party	Candidate	Votes	%
Republican	Evie Brennan (incumbent)	1,753	65.36
Republican	Daniel Singh	894	33.33
Write-in		35	1.30
Total votes		2,682	100.00

==== Democratic primary ====
===== Candidates =====
====== Declared ======
- Shifa Hamid

===== Results =====
Democratic primary results
Party	Candidate	Votes	%
Democratic	Shifa Hamid	381	97.19
Write-in		11	2.81
Total votes		392	100.00

== See also ==
- List of Wyoming legislatures
