= List of Wyoming Senate districts =

The U.S. state of Wyoming has two chambers in its state legislature. Its upper chamber, the Wyoming Senate, has currently 31 single-member districts.

The Wyoming Constitution originally mandated a county-based apportionment scheme. Previously, the state legislature had a mixed system, with both multi-member districts and single-member districts. The state Senate specifically had 9 multi-member districts and 8 single-member districts in the 1990 apportionment plan. In a 1991 federal legal case, Gorin v. Karpan, the court ruled the 1990 apportionment plan was unconstitutional. The ruling determined the district map "created unconstitutionally excessive percentage deviations from the equal population principle" established by the United States Supreme Court's interpretation of the Equal Protection Clause of the Fourteenth Amendment in the landmark 1964 case Reynolds v. Sims.

On February 21, 1992, in response to the ruling in Gorin, the state legislature enacted a new apportionment plan, with a new district scheme. The plan replaced the mixed system with a purely single-member district based system. The state Senate had 30 districts, with two state House districts nested in each one of the state Senate districts. The new districts were drawn without respect to county borders.

In the 2022 apportionment plan for the state legislature, there was an additional state Senate district added to the map.

== List of current legislative districts ==
The following is a list of districts in the Wyoming Senate.

No.	Map	Counties	Party	Senator
1st		Campbell; Crook; Weston	Rep.	Ogden Driskill
2nd		Converse; Natrona	Rep.	Brian Boner
3rd		Goshen; Niobrara; Weston	Rep.	Cheri Steinmetz
4th		Laramie	Rep.	Tara Nethercott
5th		Laramie	Rep.	Lynn Hutchings
6th		Laramie; Platte	Rep.	Taft Love
7th		Laramie	Rep.	Stephan Pappas
8th		Laramie	Rep.	Jared Olsen
9th		Albany	Dem.	Chris Rothfuss
10th		Albany	Rep.	Gary Crum
11th		Carbon; Sweetwater	Rep.	Larry S. Hicks
12th		Sweetwater	Rep.	John Kolb
13th		Sweetwater	Rep.	Stacy Jones
14th		Lincoln; Sublette; Sweetwater; Uinta	Rep.	Laura Pearson
15th		Uinta	Rep.	Wendy Schuler
16th		Lincoln; Teton	Rep.	Dan Dockstader
17th		Teton	Dem.	Mike Gierau
18th		Park	Rep.	Tim French
19th		Big Horn; Park	Rep.	Dan Laursen
20th		Big Horn; Fremont; Hot Springs; Park; Washakie	Rep.	Ed Cooper
21st		Sheridan	Rep.	Bo Biteman
22nd		Johnson; Sheridan	Rep.	Barry Crago
23rd		Campbell	Rep.	Eric Barlow
24th		Campbell	Rep.	Troy McKeown
25th		Fremont	Rep.	Cale Case
26th		Fremont	Rep.	Tim Salazar
27th		Natrona	Rep.	Bill Landen
28th		Natrona	Rep.	James Lee Anderson
29th		Natrona	Rep.	Bob Ide
30th		Natrona	Rep.	Charles Scott
31st		Laramie	Rep.	Evie Brennan

== See also ==
- List of Wyoming House of Representatives districts
