= 67th Wyoming State Legislature =

Term of state legislature in Wyoming, US

←	66th State Legislature	68th State Legislature	→
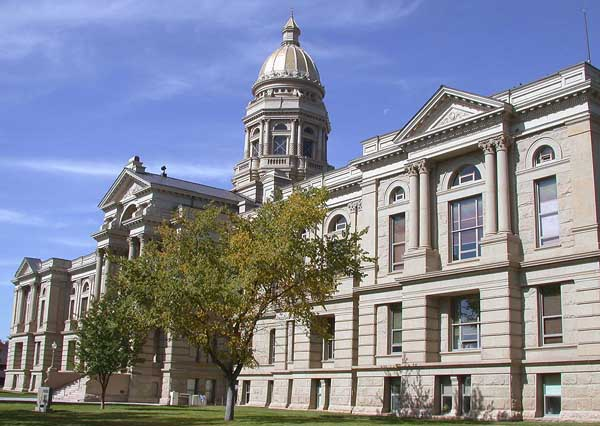
- Wyoming State Capitol

Overview
- Legislative body: Wyoming Legislature
- Jurisdiction: Wyoming, United States
- Meeting place: Wyoming State Capitol
- Term: 2023

Wyoming Senate
- Members: 31 Senators
- Senate President: Ogden Driskill (R)
- Majority Leader: Larry S. Hicks (R)
- Minority Leader: Chris Rothfuss (D)
- Party control: Republican

Wyoming House of Representatives
- Members: 62 Representatives
- Speaker of the House: Albert Sommers (R)
- Majority Leader: Chip Neiman (R)
- Minority Leader: Mike Yin (D)
- Party control: Republican

The 67th Wyoming State Legislature was a meeting of the Wyoming Legislature which convened on January 10, 2023 and adjourned on March 3, 2023. The Wyoming Republican Party achieved a veto-proof supermajority in the 2022 elections for the House and Senate. This was the first legislature convened after the 2020 United States redistricting cycle redrew district boundaries and added two new House districts and a Senate district. The House had 57 Republicans and 5 Democrats; the Senate had 29 Republicans and 2 Democrats.

== Senate ==
=== Members of the Wyoming Senate ===
District	Representative	Party
1	Ogden Driskill	Republican
2	Brian Boner	Republican
3	Cheri Steinmetz	Republican
4	Tara Nethercott	Republican
5	Lynn Hutchings	Republican
6	Anthony Bouchard	Republican
7	Stephan Pappas	Republican
8	Affie Ellis	Republican
9	Chris Rothfuss	Democratic
10	Dan Furphy	Republican
11	Larry S. Hicks	Republican
12	John Kolb	Democratic
13	Stacy Jones	Republican
14	Fred Baldwin	Republican
15	Wendy Davis Schuler	Republican
16	Dan Dockstader	Republican
17	Mike Gierau	Democratic
18	Tim French	Republican
19	Dan Laursen	Republican
20	Edward Cooper	Republican
21	Bo Biteman	Republican
22	Dave Kinskey	Republican
23	Eric Barlow	Republican
24	Troy McKeown	Republican
25	Cale Case	Republican
26	Tim Salazar	Republican
27	Bill Landen	Republican
28	James Lee Anderson	Republican
29	Bob Ide	Republican
30	Charles Scott	Republican
31	Evie Brennan	Republican

== House of Representatives ==
=== Members of the Wyoming House of Representatives ===
District	Representative	Party
1	Chip Neiman	Rep
2	Allen Slagle	Rep
3	Abby Angelos	Rep
4	Jeremy Haroldson	Rep
5	Scott Smith	Rep
6	Tomi Strock	Rep
7	Bob Nicholas	Rep
8	David Zwonitzer	Rep
9	Landon Brown	Rep
10	John Eklund, Jr.	Rep
11	Jared Olsen	Rep
12	Clarence Styvar	Rep
13	Ken Chestek	Dem
14	Trey Sherwood	Dem
15	Donald Burkhart	Rep
16	Mike Yin	Dem
17	J.T. Larson	Rep
18	Scott Heiner	Rep
19	Jon Conrad	Rep
20	Albert Sommers	Rep
21	Lane Allred	Rep
22	Andrew Byron	Rep
23	Liz Storer	Dem
24	Sandy Newsome	Rep
25	David Northrup	Rep
26	Dalton Banks	Rep
27	Martha Lawley	Rep
28	John Winter	Rep
29	Ken Pendergraft	Rep
30	Mark Jennings	Rep
31	John Bear	Rep
32	Ken Clouston	Rep
33	Sarah Penn	Rep
34	Pepper Ottman	Rep
35	Tony Locke	Rep
36	Art Washut	Rep
37	Steve Harshman	Rep
38	Tom Walters	Rep
39	Cody Wylie	Rep
40	Barry Crago	Rep
41	Bill Henderson	Rep
42	Ben Hornok	Rep
43	Dan Zwonitzer	Rep
44	Tamara Trujillo	Rep
45	Karlee Provenza	Dem
46	Ocean Andrew	Rep
47	Bob Davis	Rep
48	Clark Stith	Rep
49	Ryan Berger	Rep
50	Rachel Rodriguez-Williams	Rep
51	Cyrus Western	Rep
52	Reuben Tarver	Rep
53	Chris Knapp	Rep
54	Lloyd Larsen	Rep
55	Ember Oakley	Rep
56	Jerry Obermueller	Rep
57	Jeanette Ward	Rep
58	Bill Allemand	Rep
59	Kevin O'Hearn	Rep
60	Tony Niemiec	Rep
61	Daniel Singh	Rep
62	Forrest Chadwick	Rep
