= 2022 Wyoming Senate election =

- November 8, 2022

16 of the 31 seats in the Wyoming Senate 16 seats needed for a majority

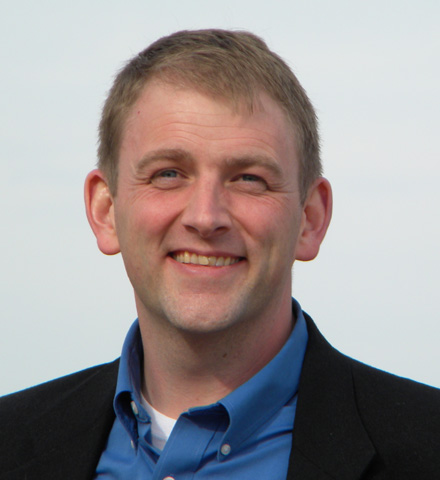
	Majority party	Minority party
Leader	Dan Dockstader	Chris Rothfuss
Party	Republican	Democratic
Leader since	January 12, 2021	January 7, 2013
Leader's seat	16th - Afton	9th - Laramie
Last election	28 seats, 86.86%	2 seats, 11.57%
Seats before	28	2
Seats after	29 (Note: Following the 2020 redistricting cycle, the Wyoming Senate added a new 31st district.)	2
Seat change	▲1	Steady
Popular vote	67,440	15,477
Percentage	75.31%	17.28%
Swing	▼11.55%	▲5.71%
- Results: Republican gain Democratic hold Republican hold No election
President of the Senate before election
Dan Dockstader
Republican
Elected President of the Senate
Ogden Driskill
Republican

The 2022 Wyoming Senate election took place on Tuesday, November 8, 2022, with the primary election held on Tuesday, August 16, 2022. Wyoming voters selected state senators in the 16 odd-numbered districts of the Senate to serve four-year terms.

The election coincided with United States national elections and Wyoming state elections, including U.S. House, Governor, and Wyoming House.

Following the previous election in 2020, Republicans held a 28-to-2-seat supermajority over Democrats. These were the first elections in the odd-numbered Wyoming Senate districts following the 2020 United States redistricting cycle, which resulted in redrawn legislative district boundaries and the creation of a new 31st district. Republicans expanded their supermajority to 29-to-2 over Democrats by gaining a seat in the new 31st district in 2022.

== Predictions ==
Source	Ranking	As of
Sabato's Crystal Ball	Safe R	May 19, 2022

== Overview ==
Summary of the November 8, 2022 Wyoming Senate election results
Party	Candidates	Votes		Seats				
Party	Candidates	No.	%	Before	Up	Won	After	+/–
Republican	15	67,440	75.31%	28	13	13	29	▲1
Democratic	6	15,477	17.28%	2	2	2	2	Steady
Independent	1	1,369	1.53%	0	0	0	0	Steady
Constitution	1	1,104	1.23%	0	0	0	0	Steady
Libertarian	1	421	0.47%	0	0	0	0	Steady
Write-in		3,735	4.17%	0	0	0	0	Steady
Total		89,546	100.00%	30	15	15	31	Steady
Source: Wyoming Elections Results

Popular vote
Republican	75.31%
Democratic	17.28%
Other	7.41%

Senate seats
Republican	93.55%
Democratic	6.45%

== Summary of results by Senate district ==
Italics denote an open seat held by the incumbent party; bold text denotes a gain for a party.

Senate District	Incumbent	Party	Elected Senator	Party
1st	Ogden Driskill	Rep	Ogden Driskill	Rep
3rd	Cheri Steinmetz	Rep	Cheri Steinmetz	Rep
5th	Lynn Hutchings	Rep	Lynn Hutchings	Rep
7th	Stephan Pappas	Rep	Stephan Pappas	Rep
9th	Chris Rothfuss	Dem	Chris Rothfuss	Dem
11th	Larry S. Hicks	Rep	Larry S. Hicks	Rep
13th	Tom James	Rep	Stacy Jones	Rep
15th	Wendy Davis Schuler	Rep	Wendy Davis Schuler	Rep
17th	Mike Gierau	Dem	Mike Gierau	Dem
19th	R. J. Kost	Rep	Dan Laursen	Rep
21st	Bo Biteman	Rep	Bo Biteman	Rep
23rd	Jeff Wasserburger	Rep	Eric Barlow	Rep
25th	Cale Case	Rep	Cale Case	Rep
27th	Bill Landen	Rep	Bill Landen	Rep
29th	Drew Perkins	Rep	Bob Ide	Rep
31st	New District		**Evie Brennan**	**Rep**

== Detailed Results by Senate District ==
Sources for election results:

=== District 1 ===
Primary Election Results
Party	Candidate	Votes	%
Republican Party Primary Results
Republican	Ogden Driskill (incumbent)	2,547	39.82%
Republican	Roger Connett	2,105	32.91%
Republican	Bill Fortner	1,736	27.14%
Write-in		9	0.14%
Total votes		6,397	100.00%

General Election Results
Party	Candidate	Votes	%
Republican	Ogden Driskill (incumbent)	4,785	75.18%
Write-in		1,580	24.82%
Total votes		6,365	100.00%
Republican hold			

=== District 3 ===
Primary Election Results
Party	Candidate	Votes	%
Republican Party Primary Results
Republican	Cheri Steinmetz (incumbent)	4,269	63.64%
Republican	Marty Ertman	2,426	36.17%
Write-in		13	0.19%
Total votes		6,708	100.00%

General Election Results
Party	Candidate	Votes	%
Republican	Cheri Steinmetz (incumbent)	6,352	96.56%
Write-in		226	3.44%
Total votes		6,578	100.00%
Republican hold			

=== District 5 ===
Primary Election Results
Party	Candidate	Votes	%
Republican Party Primary Results
Republican	Lynn Hutchings (incumbent)	3,353	95.99%
Write-in		140	4.01%
Total votes		3,493	100.00%
Democratic Party Primary Results
Democratic	Ted Hanlon	178	94.68%
Write-in		10	5.32%
Total votes		188	100.00%

General Election Results
Party	Candidate	Votes	%
Republican	Lynn Hutchings (incumbent)	3,284	70.58%
Democratic	Ted Hanlon	1,354	29.10%
Write-in		15	0.32%
Total votes		4,653	100.00%
Republican hold			

=== District 7 ===
Primary Election Results
Party	Candidate	Votes	%
Republican Party Primary Results
Republican	Stephan Pappas (incumbent)	2,199	51.90%
Republican	Rachel Bennett	1,283	30.28%
Republican	JC Manalo	717	16.92%
Write-in		38	0.90%
Total votes		4,237	100.00%
Democratic Party Primary Results
Democratic	Marcie Kindred	364	97.85%
Write-in		8	2.15%
Total votes		372	100.00%

General Election Results
Party	Candidate	Votes	%
Republican	Stephan Pappas (incumbent)	3,238	56.82%
Democratic	Marcie Kindred	2,437	42.76%
Write-in		24	0.42%
Total votes		5,699	100.00%
Republican hold			

=== District 9 ===
Primary Election Results
Party	Candidate	Votes	%
Democratic Party Primary Results
Democratic	Chris Rothfuss (incumbent)	570	99.48%
Write-in		3	0.52%
Total votes		573	100.00%
Republican Party Primary Results
Republican	Diana Seabeck	1,191	94.45%
Write-in		70	5.55%
Total votes		1,261	100.00%

General Election Results
Party	Candidate	Votes	%
Democratic	Chris Rothfuss (incumbent)	3,223	62.80%
Republican	Diana Seabeck	1,900	37.02%
Write-in		9	0.18%
Total votes		5,132	100.00%
Democratic hold			

=== District 11 ===
Primary Election Results
Party	Candidate	Votes	%
Republican Party Primary Results
Republican	Larry Hicks (incumbent)	3,694	96.90%
Write-in		118	3.10%
Total votes		3,812	100.00%

General Election Results
Party	Candidate	Votes	%
Republican	Larry Hicks (incumbent)	4,153	78.36%
Constitution	Michael Ray Williams	1,104	20.83%
Write-in		43	0.81%
Total votes		5,300	100.00%
Republican hold			

=== District 13 ===
Primary Election Results
Party	Candidate	Votes	%
Republican Party Primary Results
Republican	Stacy Jones	2,562	67.67%
Republican	Tom James (incumbent)	1,212	32.01%
Write-in		12	0.32%
Total votes		3,786	100.00%
Democratic Party Primary Results
Democratic	Leesa Kuhlmann	385	99.74%
Write-in		1	0.26%
Total votes		386	100.00%

General Election Results
Party	Candidate	Votes	%
Republican	Stacy Jones	3,859	75.76%
Democratic	Leesa Kuhlmann	1,220	23.95%
Write-in		15	0.29%
Total votes		5,094	100.00%
Republican hold			

=== District 15 ===
Primary Election Results
Party	Candidate	Votes	%
Republican Party Primary Results
Republican	Wendy Davis Schuler (incumbent)	2,997	61.40%
Republican	Robert (Bob) Wharff	1,873	38.37%
Write-in		11	0.23%
Total votes		4,881	100.00%

General Election Results
Party	Candidate	Votes	%
Republican	Wendy Davis Schuler (incumbent)	5,243	96.45%
Write-in		193	3.55%
Total votes		5,436	100.00%
Republican hold			

=== District 17 ===
Primary Election Results
Party	Candidate	Votes	%
Democratic Party Primary Results
Democratic	Michael F. "Mike" Gierau (incumbent)	330	97.92%
Write-in		7	2.08%
Total votes		337	100.00%
Republican Party Primary Results
Republican	Steve Duerr	3,313	97.21%
Write-in		95	2.79%
Total votes		3,408	100.00%

General Election Results
Party	Candidate	Votes	%
Democratic	Michael F. "Mike" Gierau (incumbent)	5,142	62.80%
Republican	Steve Duerr	2,615	31.94%
Libertarian	Amanda Padilla	421	5.14%
Write-in		10	0.12%
Total votes		8,188	100.00%
Democratic hold			

=== District 19 ===
Primary Election Results
Party	Candidate	Votes	%
Republican Party Primary Results
Republican	Dan Laursen	2,580	42.91%
Republican	R. J. Kost (incumbent)	1,866	31.03%
Republican	R. Ray Peterson	1,557	25.89%
Write-in		10	0.17%
Total votes		6,013	100.00%

General Election Results
Party	Candidate	Votes	%
Republican	Dan Laursen	5,538	93.85%
Write-in		363	6.15%
Total votes		5,901	100.00%
Republican hold			

=== District 21 ===
Primary Election Results
Party	Candidate	Votes	%
Republican Party Primary Results
Republican	Bo Biteman (incumbent)	5,262	95.22%
Write-in		264	4.78%
Total votes		5,526	100.00%
Democratic Party Primary Results
Democratic	Mark Hansen	276	98.22%
Write-in		5	1.78%
Total votes		281	100.00%

General Election Results
Party	Candidate	Votes	%
Republican	Bo Biteman (incumbent)	5,815	73.18%
Democratic	Mark Hansen	2,101	26.44%
Write-in		30	0.38%
Total votes		7,946	100.00%
Republican hold			

=== District 23 ===
Primary Election Results
Party	Candidate	Votes	%
Republican Party Primary Results
Republican	Eric Barlow	3,355	80.47%
Write-in		814	19.53%
Total votes		4,169	100.00%

General Election Results
Party	Candidate	Votes	%
Republican	Eric Barlow	3,611	72.35%
Independent	Patricia Junek	1,369	27.43%
Write-in		11	0.22%
Total votes		4,991	100.00%
Republican hold			

=== District 25 ===
Primary Election Results
Party	Candidate	Votes	%
Republican Party Primary Results
Republican	Cale Case (incumbent)	2,633	54.89%
Republican	Shawn J. Olmstead	2,152	44.86%
Write-in		12	0.25%
Total votes		4,797	100.00%

General Election Results
Party	Candidate	Votes	%
Republican	Cale Case (incumbent)	4,365	89.01%
Write-in		539	10.99%
Total votes		4,904	100.00%
Republican hold			

=== District 27 ===
Primary Election Results
Party	Candidate	Votes	%
Republican Party Primary Results
Republican	Bill Landen (incumbent)	4,059	98.07%
Write-in		80	1.93%
Total votes		4,139	100.00%

General Election Results
Party	Candidate	Votes	%
Republican	Bill Landen (incumbent)	4,477	97.50%
Write-in		115	2.50%
Total votes		4,592	100.00%
Republican hold			

=== District 29 ===
Primary Election Results
Party	Candidate	Votes	%
Republican Party Primary Results
Republican	Bob Ide	2,834	52.65%
Republican	Drew Perkins (incumbent)	2,531	47.02%
Write-in		18	0.33%
Total votes		5,383	100.00%

General Election Results
Party	Candidate	Votes	%
Republican	Bob Ide	4,402	91.44%
Write-in		412	8.56%
Total votes		4,814	100.00%
Republican hold			

=== District 31 ===
Primary Election Results
Party	Candidate	Votes	%
Republican Party Primary Results
Republican	Evie Brennan	1,871	56.44%
Republican	Janet Marschner	1,418	42.78%
Write-in		26	0.78%
Total votes		3,315	100.00%

General Election Results
Party	Candidate	Votes	%
Republican	Evie Brennan	3,807	96.21%
Write-in		150	3.79%
Total votes		3,957	100.00%
Republican win (new seat)			

== See also ==
- 2022 United States elections
- 2022 United States House of Representatives election in Wyoming
- 2022 Wyoming elections
- 2022 Wyoming gubernatorial election
- 2022 Wyoming Secretary of State election
- 2022 Wyoming House of Representatives election
- Wyoming State Legislature
- Wyoming Senate
