= Lisa Engebretsen =

American politician from Wyoming

Member-elect of the Wyoming Senate from the 29th district
- Assuming office TBD
- Succeeding: Bob Ide

Member of the Casper City Council for Ward 2
- In office 2020 – January 2025

Personal details
- Party: Republican
- Education: Casper College (A?)

Lisa Engebretsen is an American politician and real estate broker who is the member-elect of the Wyoming Senate from the 29th district. She previously served on the Casper City Council for Ward 2. Engebretsen is the owner and broker of Forefront Real Estate.

Engebretsen graduated from Casper College with an associate degree in 1988.

Engebretsen defeated incumbent state senator Bob Ide in the Republican primary election in 2026. During the campaign, she was skeptical of the Wyoming Freedom Caucus-supported plan to eliminate the state's property taxes and instead raise the state's sales tax.
