= Mark Rinne =

American politician

Member-elect of the Wyoming Senate from the 7th district
- Assuming office January 2027
- Succeeding: Stephan Pappas

Personal details
- Party: Republican

Mark Rinne is an American politician. A member of the Republican Party, he is the member-elect for the 7th district of the Wyoming Senate. Rinne has served on the Cheyenne City Council since 2007.
