= 2018 Wyoming Senate election =

2018 Wyoming State Senate election
- November 6, 2018

15 seats from odd-numbered districts
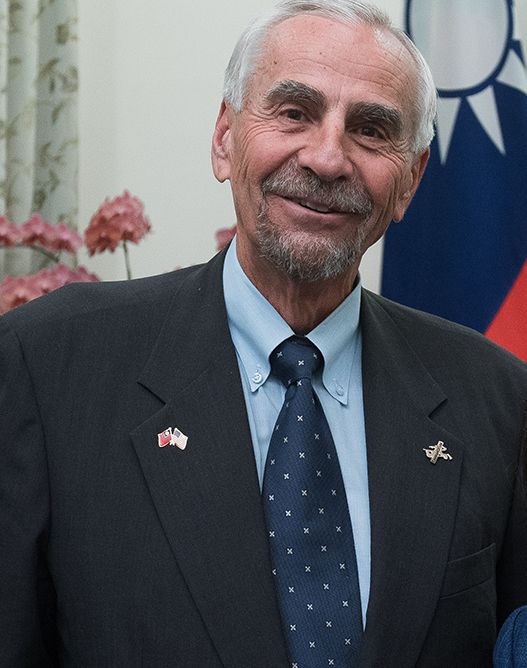

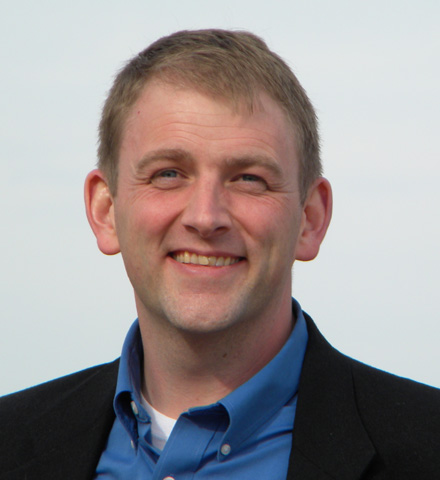
	Majority party	Minority party
Leader	Eli Bebout	Chris Rothfuss
Party	Republican	Democratic
Leader's seat	26th district	9th district
Seats before	27	3
Seats after	27	3
Seat change	Steady	Steady
Popular vote	62,128	21,854
Percentage	63.37%	22.29%
Swing	▼1.33%	▲0.66%
- Results: Democratic gain Republican gain Democratic hold Republican hold No election
President of the Senate before election
Eli Bebout
Republican
Elected President of the Senate
Eli Bebout
Republican

The 2018 Wyoming Senate election was held on Tuesday, November 6, 2018, with the primary election held on August 21, 2018. Voters in the 15 odd-numbered districts of the Wyoming State Senate elected their representatives. The elections coincided with the elections for other offices, including U.S. Senate, U.S. House, governor, and the State House.

== Predictions ==
Source	Ranking	As of
Governing	Safe R	October 8, 2018

== Primary election ==
=== Overview ===
Wyoming State Senate election, 2018 Primary election — August 21, 2018
Party	Votes	Percentage	Candidates	Advancing to general	Seats contesting
Republican	47,861	89.16%	27	14	6
Democratic	5,820	10.84%	7	7	6
Totals	53,681	100.00%	34	21	6

Popular vote
Republican	89.16%
Democratic	10.84%

=== Results ===
==== District 1 ====
Senate District 1 Republican primary
Party	Candidate	Votes	%
Republican	Ogden Driskill (incumbent)	2,069	43.23%
Republican	Judy McCullough	1,574	32.89%
Republican	Lenard D. Seeley	1,138	23.78%
Republican	Write-ins	5	0.10%
Majority		495	10.34%
Total votes		4,786	100.00%

==== District 3 ====
Senate District 3 Republican primary
Party	Candidate	Votes	%
Republican	Cheri Steinmetz	3,785	70.87%
Republican	Martin Gubbels	1,537	28.78%
Republican	Write-ins	19	0.36%
Majority		2,248	42.09%
Total votes		5,341	100.00%

Senate District 3 Democratic primary
Party	Candidate	Votes	%
Democratic	Marci Shaver	418	99.05%
Democratic	Write-ins	4	0.95%
Total votes		422	100.00%

==== District 5 ====
Senate District 5 Republican primary
Party	Candidate	Votes	%
Republican	Lynn Hutchings	1,861	43.90%
Republican	Fred Emerich (incumbent)	1,712	40.39%
Republican	Ryan Wright	658	15.52%
Republican	Write-ins	8	0.19%
Majority		149	3.51%
Total votes		4,239	100.00%

==== District 7 ====
Senate District 7 Republican primary
Party	Candidate	Votes	%
Republican	Stephan Pappas (incumbent)	1,803	98.79%
Republican	Write-ins	22	1.21%
Total votes		1,825	100.00%

==== District 9 ====
Senate District 9 Democratic primary
Party	Candidate	Votes	%
Democratic	Chris Rothfuss (incumbent)	1,032	99.71%
Democratic	Write-ins	3	0.29%
Total votes		1,035	100.00%

==== District 11 ====
Senate District 11 Republican primary
Party	Candidate	Votes	%
Republican	Larry S. Hicks (incumbent)	2,506	97.36%
Republican	Write-ins	68	2.64%
Total votes		2,574	100.00%

Senate District 11 Democratic primary
Party	Candidate	Votes	%
Democratic	Lee Ann Stephenson	570	100.00%
Total votes		570	100.00%

==== District 13 ====
Senate District 13 Republican primary
Party	Candidate	Votes	%
Republican	Tom James	1,537	98.72%
Republican	Write-ins	20	1.28%
Total votes		1,557	100.00%

Senate District 13 Democratic primary
Party	Candidate	Votes	%
Democratic	John Hastert (incumbent)	953	98.96%
Democratic	Write-ins	10	1.04%
Total votes		963	100.00%

==== District 15 ====
Senate District 15 Republican primary
Party	Candidate	Votes	%
Republican	Wendy Davis Schuler	1,245	35.15%
Republican	Shaun Sims	886	25.01%
Republican	Paul Robert Barnard (incumbent)	642	18.13%
Republican	Eugene Joyce	404	11.41%
Republican	Jaraun Dennis	362	10.22%
Republican	Write-ins	3	0.08%
Majority		359	10.14%
Total votes		3,542	100.00%

==== District 17 ====
Senate District 17 Republican primary
Party	Candidate	Votes	%
Republican	Kate Mead	2,375	97.94%
Republican	Write-ins	50	2.06%
Total votes		2,425	100.00%

Senate District 17 Democratic primary
Party	Candidate	Votes	%
Democratic	Mike Gierau	1,284	99.23%
Democratic	Write-ins	10	0.77%
Total votes		1,294	100.00%

==== District 19 ====
Senate District 19 Republican primary
Party	Candidate	Votes	%
Republican	R. J. Kost	2,246	53.80%
Republican	R. Ray Peterson (incumbent)	1,921	46.01%
Republican	Write-ins	8	0.19%
Majority		325	7.79%
Total votes		4,175	100.00%

==== District 21 ====
Senate District 21 Republican primary
Party	Candidate	Votes	%
Republican	Bo Biteman	2,667	55.37%
Republican	Dave Clarendon	1,842	38.24%
Republican	Dustin Looper	299	6.21%
Republican	Write-ins	9	0.19%
Majority		825	17.13%
Total votes		4,817	100.00%

Senate District 21 Democratic primary
Party	Candidate	Votes	%
Democratic	Hollis Hackman	600	99.50%
Democratic	Write-ins	3	0.50%
Total votes		603	100.00%

==== District 23 ====
Senate District 23 Republican primary
Party	Candidate	Votes	%
Republican	Jeff Wasserburger (incumbent)	2,043	58.93%
Republican	Jeff Raney	1,419	40.93%
Republican	Write-ins	5	0.14%
Majority		624	18.00%
Total votes		3,467	100.00%

==== District 25 ====
Senate District 25 Republican primary
Party	Candidate	Votes	%
Republican	Cale Case (incumbent)	2,608	96.49%
Republican	Write-ins	95	3.51%
Total votes		2,703	100.00%

Senate District 25 Democratic primary
Party	Candidate	Votes	%
Democratic	Sergio A. Maldonado, Sr	923	98.51%
Democratic	Write-ins	14	1.49%
Total votes		937	100.00%

==== District 27 ====
Senate District 27 Republican primary
Party	Candidate	Votes	%
Republican	Bill Landen (incumbent)	3,154	98.78%
Republican	Write-ins	39	1.22%
Total votes		3,193	100.00%

==== District 29 ====
Senate District 27 Republican primary
Party	Candidate	Votes	%
Republican	Drew Perkins (incumbent)	3,169	98.51%
Republican	Write-ins	48	1.49%
Total votes		3,217	100.00%

== General election ==
=== Overview ===
Wyoming State Senate elections, 2018 General election — November 6, 2018
Party	Votes	Percentage	Not up	Contested	Before	After	+/–
Republican	62,128	63.37%	14	14	27	27	Steady
Democratic	21,854	22.29%	1	7	3	3	Steady
Under or Over Votes	11,728	11.96%	-	-	-	-	-
Write-ins	1,437	1.47%	-	-	-	-	-
Independent	889	0.91%	0	1	0	0	Steady
Totals	98,036	100.00%	15	15	30	30	N/A

Popular vote
Republican	63.37%
Democratic	22.29%
Other	11.96%

Senate seats
Republican	90.00%
Democratic	10.00%

=== Results ===
==== District 1 ====
Republican incumbent Ogden Driskill was re-elected with no challenger.

Senate District 1 general election
Party	Candidate	Votes	%
Republican	Ogden Driskill (incumbent)	5,557	96.74%
Write-In	Write-ins	187	3.26%
Total votes		5,744	100.00%
Invalid or blank votes		1,115	N/A
Republican hold			

==== District 3 ====
Republican Cheri Steinmetz was elected with 80% of the vote, compared to Democrat Marci Shaver, who received 20% of the vote.

Senate District 3 general election
Party	Candidate	Votes	%
Republican	Cheri Steinmetz	5,721	79.62%
Democratic	Marci Shaver	1,449	20.17%
Write-In	Write-ins	15	0.21%
Total votes		7,185	100.00%
Majority		4,272	59.45%
Invalid or blank votes		265	N/A
Republican hold			

==== District 5 ====
Republican Lynn Hutchings won the election with no challengers.

Senate District 5 general election
Party	Candidate	Votes	%
Republican	Lynn Hutchings	5,382	94.65%
Write-In	Write-ins	304	5.35%
Total votes		5,686	100.00%
Invalid or blank votes		1,776	N/A
Republican hold			

==== District 7 ====
Republican incumbent Stephan Pappas won the election with no challengers.

Senate District 7 general election
Party	Candidate	Votes	%
Republican	Stephan Pappas (incumbent)	3,723	97.74%
Write-In	Write-ins	86	2.26%
Total votes		3,809	100.00%
Invalid or blank votes		1,069	N/A
Republican hold			

==== District 9 ====
Democratic incumbent Chris Rothfuss won the election with no challengers.

Senate District 9 general election
Party	Candidate	Votes	%
Democratic	Chris Rothfuss (incumbent)	4,668	96.59%
Write-In	Write-ins	165	3.41%
Total votes		4,833	100.00%
Invalid or blank votes		1,562	N/A
Democratic hold			

==== District 11 ====
Republican incumbent Larry S. Hicks was re-elected with 66% of the vote, compared to Democrat Lee Ann Stephenson, who received 34% of the vote.

Senate District 11 general election
Party	Candidate	Votes	%
Republican	Larry S. Hicks (incumbent)	3,757	65.83%
Democratic	Lee Ann Stephenson	1,939	33.98%
Write-In	Write-ins	11	0.19%
Total votes		5,707	100.00%
Majority		1,818	31.85%
Invalid or blank votes		239	N/A
Republican hold			

==== District 13 ====
Republican Tom James defeated incumbent Democrat John Hastert with 47% of the vote to Hastert's 37%. Independent candidate Ted L. Barney won 16% of the vote.

Senate District 13 general election
Party	Candidate	Votes	%
Republican	Tom James	2,625	46.63%
Democratic	John Hastert (incumbent)	2,108	37.46%
Independent	Ted L. Barney	889	15.80%
Write-In	Write-ins	6	0.11%
Total votes		5,628	100.00%
Majority		520	9.17%
Invalid or blank votes		261	N/A
Republican gain from Democratic			

==== District 15 ====
Republican Wendy Davis Schuler won the election with no challengers.

Senate District 15 general election
Party	Candidate	Votes	%
Republican	Wendy Davis Schuler	4,900	97.65%
Write-In	Write-ins	118	2.35%
Total votes		5,018	100.00%
Invalid or blank votes		754	N/A
Republican hold			

==== District 17 ====
Democratic candidate Mike Gierau won the election with 62% of the vote against Republican Kate Mead, who received 38% of the vote.

Senate District 17 general election
Party	Candidate	Votes	%
Democratic	Mike Gierau	6,008	62.27%
Republican	Kate Mead	3,631	37.67%
Write-In	Write-ins	9	0.09%
Total votes		9,648	100.00%
Majority		2,377	24.63%
Invalid or blank votes		205	N/A
Democratic gain from Republican			

==== District 19 ====
Republican R J Kost won the election with no challengers.

Senate District 19 general election
Party	Candidate	Votes	%
Republican	R. J. Kost	5,569	97.38%
Write-In	Write-ins	150	2.62%
Total votes		5,719	100.00%
Invalid or blank votes		741	N/A
Republican hold			

==== District 21 ====
Republican Bo Biteman was elected with 64% of the vote, compared to Democrat Hollis Hackman, who received 35% of the vote.

Senate District 21 general election
Party	Candidate	Votes	%
Republican	Bo Biteman	5,125	64.46%
Democratic	Hollis Hackman	2,810	35.34%
Write-In	Write-ins	16	0.20%
Total votes		7,951	100.00%
Majority		2,315	29.12%
Invalid or blank votes		265	N/A
Republican hold			

==== District 23 ====
Republican incumbent Jeff Wasserburger won the election with no challengers.

Senate District 19 general election
Party	Candidate	Votes	%
Republican	Jeff Wasserburger (incumbent)	5,116	98.21%
Write-In	Write-ins	93	1.84%
Total votes		5,209	100.00%
Invalid or blank votes		723	N/A
Republican hold			

==== District 25 ====
Republican incumbent Cale Case was elected with 58% of the vote, compared to Democrat Sergio A. Maldonado Sr., who received 42% of the vote.

Senate District 21 general election
Party	Candidate	Votes	%
Republican	Cale Case (incumbent)	4,012	58.09%
Democratic	Sergio A. Maldonado, Sr.	2,872	41.58%
Write-In	Write-ins	23	0.33%
Total votes		6,907	100.00%
Majority		1,140	16.51%
Invalid or blank votes		278	N/A
Republican hold			

==== District 27 ====
Republican incumbent Bill Landen won the election with no challengers.

Senate District 27 general election
Party	Candidate	Votes	%
Republican	Bill Landen (incumbent)	5,451	97.76%
Write-In	Write-ins	125	2.24%
Total votes		5,576	100.00%
Invalid or blank votes		1,199	N/A
Republican hold			

==== District 29 ====
Republican incumbent Drew Perkins won the election with no challengers.

Senate District 29 general election
Party	Candidate	Votes	%
Republican	Drew Perkins (incumbent)	5,282	97.62%
Write-In	Write-ins	129	2.38%
Total votes		5,411	100.00%
Invalid or blank votes		1,276	N/A
Republican hold			
