= Senator Nutting =

Senator Nutting may refer to:

- John Nutting (politician) (born 1949), Maine State Senate
- Leslie Nutting (born 1945), Wyoming State Senate
