= Kevin Helling =

American politician

Member-elect of the Wyoming Senate from the 27th district
- Assuming office January 2027
- Succeeding: Bill Landen

Personal details
- Party: Republican

Kevin Helling is an American politician. A member of the Republican Party, he is the member-elect for the 27th district of the Wyoming Senate.
