= Senator Ide =

Senator Ide may refer to:

- Bob Ide (fl. 2020s), Wyoming State Senate
- Henry Clay Ide (1844–1921), Vermont State Senate
