= Loraine Rollins =

American politician

Member of the Wyoming House of Representatives
- In office 1927–1929
- In office 1917–1921

Personal details
- Party: Democratic
- Occupation: Politician

Loraine Rollins was an American politician who served in the Wyoming House of Representatives from 1917 to 1921 and from 1927 to 1929 (Note: According to the Wyoming Legislature, Rollins served from 1917 to 1919 and in 1927.) in the 14th, 15th, and 19th Wyoming Legislatures. He represented the counties of Uinta and Uinta-Lincoln as a Democrat.

== Notes ==
Wyoming House of Representatives
Preceded by —	Member of the Wyoming House of Representatives; 1917–1921, 1927–1929	Succeeded by —
