= 2024 Wyoming elections =

- Turnout: Of voting-age population: 27.00% (primary) ▼13.82 pp 59.65% (general) ▲15.25 pp

10–20%
20–30%
30–40%
40–50%
50–60%
60–70%
70–80%

The 2024 Wyoming elections were held in large part on November 5, 2024, to elect members of the federal, state, and local governments.

== Election schedule ==
- April 13, 2024: Democratic presidential caucuses.
- April 20, 2024: Republican presidential caucuses.
- August 20, 2024: State, federal, and local primaries.
- November 5, 2024: General election.

== President of the United States ==
2024 United States presidential election in Wyoming
Party	Candidate	Votes	%	±%
Republican	Donald Trump; JD Vance	192,633	71.60%	+1.64%
Democratic	Kamala Harris; Tim Walz	69,527	25.84%	−0.71%
Libertarian	Chase Oliver; Mike ter Maat	4,193	1.56%	−0.49%
Write-in		2,695	1.00%	+0.37%
Total votes		269,048	100.00%	
Republican win				

== United States Senate ==
2024 United States Senate election in Wyoming
Party	Candidate	Votes	%	±%
Republican	John Barrasso (incumbent)	198,418	75.11%	+8.15%
Democratic	Scott Morrow	63,727	24.12%	−5.98%
Write-in		2,017	0.76%	+0.60%
Total votes		264,162	100.00%	N/A
Republican hold				

== United States House of Representatives ==
2024 Wyoming's at-large congressional district election
Party	Candidate	Votes	%	±%
Republican	Harriet Hageman (incumbent)	184,680	70.61%	+2.43
Democratic	Kyle Cameron	60,778	23.24%	−1.13
Libertarian	Richard Brubaker	9,223	3.53%	+0.73
Constitution	Jeffrey Haggit	5,362	2.05%	−0.27
Write-in		1,505	0.58%	-1.75
Total votes		261,548	100.00%	N/A
Republican hold				

== State legislature ==
=== Wyoming Senate ===
Summary of the 2024 Wyoming Senate election results
Party	Candidates	Votes	%	Seats				
Party	Candidates	Votes	%	Before 67th Leg.	Up	Won	After 68th Leg.	+/–
Republican	15	105,174	89.78	29	15	15	29	Steady
Democratic	3	7,742	6.61	2	0	0	2	Steady
Write-in		4,227	3.61	—				
Valid ballots		117,143	87.24	—				
Blank or invalid ballots		17,139	12.76	—				
Total		134,282	100%	31	15		31	Steady

=== Wyoming House of Representatives ===
Summary of the 2024 Wyoming House of Representatives election results
Party	Candidates	Votes	%	Seats		
Party	Candidates	Votes	%	Before 67th Leg.	Won 68th Leg.	+/–
Republican	60	197,212	83.39	57	56	▼1
Democratic	16	28,497	12.05	5	6	▲1
Independents	1	865	0.37	0	0	Steady
Write-in		9,929	4.20	—		
Valid ballots		236,503	87.23	—		
Blank or invalid ballots		34,620	12.77	—		
Total		271,123	100%	62		Steady

== Constitutional Amendment A ==
2024 Wyoming Constitutional Amendment A
- November 5, 2024
- An act relating to ad valorem taxation; specifying the property tax assessment ratio for the residential property for owner occupied primary residences class; providing an appropriation; and providing for a delayed and contingent effective date.

Results
Choice	Votes	%
Yes	146,336	59.31%
No	100,392	40.69%
Valid votes	246,728	91.00%
Invalid or blank votes	24,395	9.00%
Total votes	271,123	100.00%

Yes
90–100%
80–90%
70–80%
60–70%
50–60%
No
90–100%
80–90%
70–80%
60–70%
50–60%
Other
No data

2024 Wyoming Constitutional Amendment A would "separate residential real property into its own class of property for purposes of property tax assessments. The amendment would authorize the legislature to create a subclass of owner occupied primary residences."

2024 Wyoming Constitutional Amendment A
Choice	Votes	%
Yes	146,336	59.31%
No	100,392	40.69%
Valid votes	246,728	91.00%
Invalid or blank votes	24,395	9.00%
Total votes	271,123	100.00%

== Judicial elections ==
Thirty judges were stood for retention election on November 5, including two Supreme Court justices for 8-year terms, fourteen circuit court judges for 4-year terms, and fourteen district court judges for 6-year terms.

Justice John G. Fenn retention election
Choice	Votes	%
Yes	175,991	77.74%
No	50,382	22.26%
Valid votes	226,373	83.49%
Invalid or blank votes	44,750	16.51%
Total votes	271,123	100.00%

Chief Justice Kate M. Fox retention election
Choice	Votes	%
Yes	177,803	78.64%
No	48,638	21.36%
Valid votes	226,441	83.52%
Invalid or blank votes	44,682	16.48%
Total votes	271,123	100.00%
