= June Boyle =

Wyoming politician

Member of the Wyoming Senate from the Albany district
- In office 1962–1972

Member of the Wyoming House of Representatives from the Albany district
- In office 1972–1984

June Boyle is an American Democratic politician from Laramie, Wyoming. She represented the Albany district in the Wyoming Senate from 1972 to 1984 and the Wyoming House of Representatives from 1962 to 1972.
