= Wyoming's 27th State Senate district =

American legislative district

- Wyoming's 27th State Senate district as of 2022
Senator
Bill Landen; R–Casper
- Demographics: 88% White; 1% Black; 7% Hispanic; 1% Asian; 3% Multiracial
- Population (2022): 17,831

Wyoming's 27th State Senate district is one of 31 districts in the Wyoming Senate. The district encompasses part of Natrona County. It is represented by Republican Senator Bill Landen of Casper.

In 1992, the state of Wyoming switched from electing state legislators by county to a district-based system.

== List of members representing the district ==
Representative	Party	Term	Note
Gail D. Zimmerman	Republican	1993 – 1999	Elected in 1992. Re-elected in 1994.
Bruce A. Hinchey	Republican	1999 – 2003	Elected in 1998.
John Barrasso	Republican	2003 – 2007	Elected in 2002. Re-elected in 2006. Resigned in 2007.
Bill Landen	Republican	2007 – present	Appointed in 2007. Elected in 2008. Re-elected in 2010. Re-elected in 2014. Re-elected in 2018. Re-elected in 2022.

== Recent election results ==
=== 2006 ===
Senate district 27 general election
Party	Candidate	Votes	%
Republican	John Barrasso (incumbent)	5,812	100.0%
Total votes		5,812	100.0%
Republican hold			

=== 2008 ===
Senate district 27 general election
Party	Candidate	Votes	%
Republican	Bill Landen (incumbent)	5,563	61.13%
Democratic	Bert Toews	3,523	38.71%
Write-ins		13	0.14%
Total votes		9,099	100.0%
Invalid or blank votes		387	
Republican hold			

=== 2010 ===
Senate district 27 general election
Party	Candidate	Votes	%
Republican	Bill Landen (incumbent)	5,569	99.09%
Write-ins		51	0.90%
Total votes			100.0%
Invalid or blank votes		1,216	
Republican hold			

=== 2014 ===
Senate district 27 general election
Party	Candidate	Votes	%
Republican	Bill Landen (incumbent)	4,670	98.41%
Write-ins		75	1.58%
Total votes		4,745	100.0%
Invalid or blank votes		1,049	
Republican hold			

=== 2018 ===
Senate district 27 general election
Party	Candidate	Votes	%
Republican	Bill Landen (incumbent)	5,451	97.75%
Write-ins		125	2.24%
Total votes		5,576	100.0%
Invalid or blank votes		1,199	
Republican hold			

=== 2022 ===
Senate district 27 general election
Party	Candidate	Votes	%
Republican	Bill Landen (incumbent)	4,477	97.49%
Write-ins		115	2.50%
Total votes		4,592	100.0%
Invalid or blank votes		968	
Republican hold			

== Historical district boundaries ==
Map	Description	Apportionment Plan	Notes
	Natrona County (part)	1992 Apportionment Plan	
	Natrona County (part)	2002 Apportionment Plan	
	Natrona County (part)	2012 Apportionment Plan	
