= Kathryn Sessions =

American politician (1942–2026)

Minority Leader of the Wyoming Senate
- In office 2009–2010
- Preceded by: Ken Decaria
- Succeeded by: John Hastert

Member of the Wyoming Senate from the 7th district
- In office January 1999 – January 11, 2011
- Preceded by: Guy E. Cameron
- Succeeded by: Leslie Nutting

Member of the Wyoming House of Representatives from the 43rd district
- In office 1993–1998
- Preceded by: Constituency established
- Succeeded by: Doug Samuelson

Personal details
- Born: February 13, 1942 Jackson, Wyoming, U.S.
- Died: May 25, 2026 (aged 84)
- Party: Democratic
- Spouse: Widowed
- Profession: Educator

Kathryn L. Sessions (February 13, 1942 – May 25, 2026) was an American politician who was a Democratic member of the Wyoming Senate, representing the 7th district from 1999 until 2011. She previously served in the Wyoming House of Representatives, representing the 43rd district from 1993 through 1998.

Sessions was a Latter-day Saint. She died on May 25, 2026, at the age of 84.
