= Leslie Nutting =

American politician (born 1945)

Leslie J. Nutting

Member of the Wyoming Senate from the 7th district
- In office January 11, 2011 – January 5, 2015
- Preceded by: Kathryn Sessions
- Succeeded by: Stephan Pappas

Personal details
- Born: July 4, 1945 (age 81) Rifle, Colorado, U.S.
- Party: Republican
- Education: University of Colorado Boulder
- Occupation: Nurse practitioner

Military service
- Allegiance: United States
- Branch/service: United States Army
- Years of service: 1990-1995
- Rank: Major

Leslie J. Nutting (born July 4, 1945) is an American politician. A Republican member of the Wyoming Senate, she represented the 7th district from 2011 until 2015. Senate District 7 encompasses Laramie County, which includes the city of Cheyenne. From 2011 until 2013, she was the only woman in the Wyoming Senate. Nutting was joined by Democrat Bernadine Craft in January 2013.

== Elections ==
=== 2010 ===
Nutting ran a write-in campaign against incumbent Democratic State Senator Kathryn Sessions. She won the Republican primary unopposed and defeated Sessions, 54% to 46%.

=== 2014 ===
Nutting declined to run for a second term, and was succeeded by Republican Stephan Pappas.

== Personal life ==
Nutting attended Castle High School in New Castle, Colorado. She received a B.S.N. at Loretto Heights College in 1978 and an M.S.N. from the University of Colorado Boulder in 1980.
