= Wyoming's 29th State Senate district =

American legislative district

- Wyoming's 29th State Senate district as of 2022
Senator
Bob Ide; R–Casper
- Demographics: 85% White; 9% Hispanic; 1% Other; 4% Multiracial
- Population (2022) • Voting age: 19,885; 18

Wyoming's 29th State Senate district is one of 31 districts in the Wyoming Senate. The district encompasses part of Natrona County. It is represented by Republican Senator Bob Ide.

In 1992, the state of Wyoming switched from electing state legislators by county to a district-based system.

== List of members representing the district ==
Representative	Party	Term	Note
Barbara Cubin	Republican	1993 – 1995	Elected in 1992.
Bill Hawks	Republican	1995 – 2007	Elected in 1994. Re-elected in 1998. Re-elected in 2002.
Drew Perkins	Republican	2007 – 2022	Elected in 2006. Re-elected in 2010. Re-elected in 2014. Re-elected in 2018. Resigned in 2022.
Bob Ide	Republican	2022 – present	Elected in 2022. Appointed in 2022.

== Recent election results ==
=== Federal and statewide results ===
Office	Year	District	Statewide
President	2016	Trump 71.34% – Clinton 21.20%	Donald; Trump
President	2012	Romney 67.91% – Obama 29.11%	Mitt; Romney
Senate	2012	Barrasso 75.67% – Chesnut 21.75%	John; Barrasso
Representative	2012	Lummis 66.32% – Henrichsen 26.01%	Cynthia; Lummis

=== 2006 ===
Senate District 29 general election
Party	Candidate	Votes	%
Republican	Drew Perkins	3,335	51.06%
Democratic	Larry Clapp	3,196	48.94%
Total votes		6,531	100.0%
Republican hold			

=== 2010 ===
Senate District 29 general election
Party	Candidate	Votes	%
Republican	Drew Perkins (incumbent)	4,685	100.0%
Total votes		4,685	100.0%
Republican hold			

=== 2014 ===
Senate District 29 general election
Party	Candidate	Votes	%
Republican	Drew Perkins (incumbent)	4,613	100.0%
Total votes		4,613	100.0%
Republican hold			

=== 2018 ===
Republican Incumbent Drew Perkins won the election with no challengers.

Senate District 29 general election
Party	Candidate	Votes	%
Republican	Drew Perkins (incumbent)	5,282	97.62%
Write-In	Write-ins	129	2.38%
Total votes		5,411	100.00%
Invalid or blank votes		1,276	N/A
Republican hold			

=== 2022 ===
See: 2022 Wyoming Senate election

== Historical district boundaries ==
Map	Description	Apportionment plan	Notes
	Natrona County (part)	1992 Apportionment Plan	
	Natrona County (part)	2002 Apportionment Plan	
	Natrona County (part)	2012 Apportionment Plan	
