= Wyoming's 31st State Senate district =

American legislative district

- Wyoming's 31st State Senate district as of 2022
Senator
Evie Brennan; R–Cheyenne
- Demographics: 73% White; 4% Black; 18% Hispanic; 1% Other; 4% Multiracial
- Population (2022): 19,590

Wyoming's 31st State Senate district is one of 31 districts in the Wyoming Senate. The district encompasses part of Laramie County. It is represented by Republican Senator Evie Brennan of Cheyenne.

During the 2020 redistricting cycle, the Wyoming Legislature passed a bill in 2022 solidifying the new legislative district boundaries in the state. These changed districts included adding a new seat, the 31st district, to the state senate, which previously had only 30 seats.

== List of members representing the district ==
Representative	Party	Term	Note
Evie Brennan	Republican	2023 – present	Elected in 2022.

== Election results ==
=== 2022 ===
Senate district 31 general election
Party	Candidate	Votes	%
Republican	Evie Brennan	3,807	96.20%
Write-ins		150	3.79%
Total votes		3,957	100.0%
Invalid or blank votes		691	
