= 2010 Wyoming Senate election =

- November 2, 2010

15 of 30 seats in the Wyoming Senate (odd-numbered seats up)
	Majority party	Minority party
Leader	John Hines	Kathryn Sessions (defeated)
Party	Republican	Democratic
Leader's seat	23rd district	7th district
Seats before	23	7
Seats after	26	4
Seat change	▲3	▼3
Popular vote	89,939	10,686
Percentage	82.12%	9.76%
- Results by district
Senate President before election
John Hines
Republican
Elected Senate President
Jim Anderson
Republican

The 2010 Wyoming Senate election was held on November 2, 2010, to elect members to the Wyoming Senate for its 61st session as part of the 2010 United States elections. Partisan primaries were held on August 17. Republicans gained three seats in the Senate in a cycle that was characterized as a "red wave".

== Predictions ==
Source	Ranking	As of
Governing	Safe R	November 1, 2010

== Overview ==
General election summary
Party	Candidates	Votes	%	Seats				
Party	Candidates	Votes	%	Before 60th Leg.	Up	Won	After 61st Leg.	+/–
Republican	13	57,997	71.05	23	10	13	26	▲3
Democratic	8	22,230	27.23	7	5	2	4	▼3
Independents	1	534	0.65	0	0	0	0	Steady
Write-in		870	1.07	—				
Valid ballots		81,631	88.24	—				
Blank or invalid ballots		10,882	11.76	—				
Total		92,513	100%	30	15		30	Steady

Popular vote
Republican	71.05%
Democratic	27.23%
Independents	0.65%
Write-ins	1.07%

Seats won
Republican	86.67%
Democratic	13.33%

Total senate seats
Republican	86.67%
Democratic	13.33%
