= Wyoming's 7th State Senate district =

American legislative district

- Wyoming's 7th State Senate district as of 2022
Senator
Stephan Pappas; R–Cheyenne
- Demographics: 76% White; 3% Black; 16% Hispanic; 1% Asian; 2% Other; 2% Multiracial
- Population (2022): 19,833

Wyoming's 7th State Senate district is one of 31 districts in the Wyoming Senate. The district encompasses part of Laramie County. It is represented by Republican Senator Stephan Pappas of Cheyenne.

In 1992, the state of Wyoming switched from electing state legislators by county to a district-based system.

== List of members representing the district ==
Representative	Party	Term	Note
Guy E. Cameron	Democratic	1993 – 1999	Elected in 1992. Re-elected in 1994.
Kathryn Sessions	Democratic	1999 – 2011	Elected in 1998. Re-elected in 2002. Re-elected in 2006.
Leslie Nutting	Republican	2011 – 2015	Elected in 2010.
Stephan Pappas	Republican	2015 – present	Elected in 2014. Re-elected in 2018. Re-elected in 2022.

== Recent election results ==
=== 2006 ===
Senate district 7 general election
Party	Candidate	Votes	%
Democratic	Kathryn Sessions (incumbent)	4,157	100.0%
Total votes		4,157	100.0%
Democratic hold			

=== 2010 ===
Senate district 7 general election
Party	Candidate	Votes	%
Republican	Leslie Nutting	2,421	54.30%
Democratic	Kathryn Sessions (incumbent)	2,029	45.51%
Write-ins		8	0.17%
Total votes		4,458	100.0%
Invalid or blank votes		182	
Republican gain from Democratic			

=== 2014 ===
Senate district 7 general election
Party	Candidate	Votes	%
Republican	Stephan Pappas	2,258	59.00%
Democratic	Dameione S. Cameron	1,563	40.84%
Write-ins		6	0.15%
Total votes		3,827	100.0%
Invalid or blank votes		157	
Republican hold			

=== 2018 ===
Senate district 7 general election
Party	Candidate	Votes	%
Republican	Stephan Pappas (incumbent)	3,723	97.74%
Write-ins		86	2.25%
Total votes		3,809	100.0%
Invalid or blank votes		1,069	
Republican hold			

=== 2022 ===
Senate district 7 general election
Party	Candidate	Votes	%
Republican	Stephan Pappas (incumbent)	3,238	56.81%
Democratic	Marcie Kindred	2,437	42.76%
Write-ins		24	0.42%
Total votes		5,699	100.0%
Invalid or blank votes		111	
Republican hold			

== Historical district boundaries ==
Map	Description	Apportionment Plan	Notes
	Laramie County (part)	1992 Apportionment Plan	
	Laramie County (part)	2002 Apportionment Plan	
	Laramie County (part)	2012 Apportionment Plan	
