= Tom James (Wyoming politician) =

American politician

Member of the Wyoming Senate from the 13th district
- In office January 7, 2019 – January 2, 2023
- Preceded by: John Hastert
- Succeeded by: Stacy Jones

Personal details
- Party: Republican

Military service
- Branch/service: Oregon National Guard

Tom James is an American politician and surface miner who served as a member of the Wyoming Senate from the 13th district, which includes Sweetwater County.

== Career ==
Prior to entering politics, James worked as a surface miner for Ciner Wyoming and a switchman for the Union Pacific Railroad. From 2012 to 2018, James served as a welder and machinist in the Oregon Army National Guard. James took office on January 7, 2019, after defeating Democratic incumbent John Hastert in the 2018 general election.
