= Evie Brennan =

American politician from Wyoming

Member of the Wyoming Senate from the 31st district
- Incumbent
- Assumed office January 2, 2023
- Preceded by: Constituency established

Personal details
- Born: Cheyenne, Wyoming
- Party: Republican
- Education: University of Wyoming

Evie Brennan is an American politician. She has served as the first member of the Wyoming Senate from the 31st district since the 2022 Wyoming Senate election. She is running for re-election in the 2026 Wyoming Senate election.

== Biography ==
Brennan attended the University of Wyoming and studied for a Bachelors of Science in Nursing.

Brennan was elected in the 2022 Wyoming Senate election. She has been interested in healthcare and education in the legislature. She introduced legislation to public-school facilities remain are accessible for public use. She voted against killed a proposed constitutional amendment on abortion. She has supported affordable housing initiatives. She was endorsed by AFP-WY in 2026.

Brennan and her husband have four children. She has been a home schooler.
