= Wyoming Constitution =

American state constitution

The Constitution of the State of Wyoming is the supreme governing document of the U.S. state of Wyoming. Wyoming held a constitutional convention in 1889. The constitution was approved by a statewide vote of 6,272 to 1,923 on November 5, 1889. It was last amended in 2024.

It was the first constitution in the United States which explicitly gave women the right to vote (though an earlier New Jersey constitution gave women who owned property the right to vote because of an ambiguity in its text). The Wyoming state legislature also approved this with minor changes in 1896.
