= 2014 Wyoming Senate election =

- November 4, 2014

15 seats in the Wyoming Senate (odd-numbered seats up)

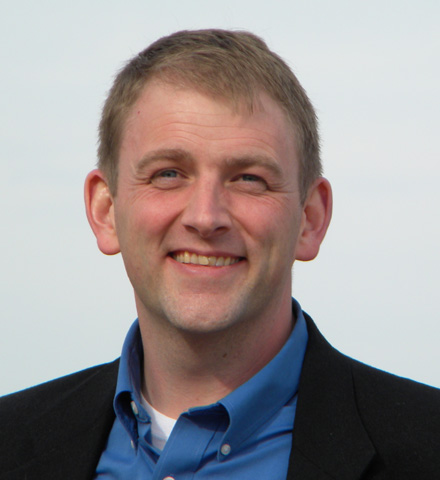
	Majority party	Minority party
Leader	Tony Ross	Chris Rothfuss
Party	Republican	Democratic
Leader's seat	4th district	9th district
Seats before	26	4
Seats after	26	4
Seat change	Steady	Steady
Popular vote	56,142	14,276
Percentage	78.37%	19.93%
- Results by district
Senate President before election
Tony Ross
Republican
Elected Senate President
Phil Nicholas
Republican

The 2014 Wyoming Senate election was held on November 4, 2014, to elect members to the Wyoming Senate for its 63rd session as part of the 2014 United States elections. Partisan primaries were held on August 19. While 2014 was widely characterized as a "red wave" election, Republicans made no gains in the state senate, as no Democratic-held seat faced any opposition candidates in the general election. Of the fifteen seats up for election, only four saw competition between Republicans and Democrats, with Republicans winning all four.

== Summary ==
General election summary
Party	Candidates	Votes	%	Seats				
Party	Candidates	Votes	%	Before 62nd Leg.	Up	Won	After 63rd Leg.	+/–
Republican	13	56,142	78.37	26	13	13	26	Steady
Democratic	6	14,276	19.93	4	2	2	4	Steady
Write-in		1,217	1.70	—				
Valid ballots		71,635	84.21	—				
Blank or invalid ballots		13,428	15.79	—				
Total		85,063	100%	30	15		30	Steady

Popular vote
Republican	78.37%
Democratic	19.93%
Write-ins	1.70%

Seats won
Republican	86.67%
Democratic	13.33%

Total senate seats
Republican	86.67%
Democratic	13.33%

== Predictions ==
Source	Ranking	As of
Governing	Safe R	October 20, 2014
