= Ed Cooper (politician) =

American politician

Member of the Wyoming Senate from the 20th district
- Incumbent
- Assumed office January 4, 2021
- Preceded by: Wyatt Agar

Personal details
- Party: Republican

Ed Cooper is currently a Republican member of the Wyoming Senate representing District 20 since January 4, 2021.

== Career ==
Cooper is a self-employed oil and gas consultant. On November 3, 2020, Cooper defeated Democrat Theresa Livingston for the Wyoming Senate seat representing the 20th district. Cooper was sworn in as State Senator on January 4, 2021.
