= Wyoming Legislature =

Legislative branch of the state government of Wyoming

Wyoming State Legislature
- 68th Wyoming Legislature

Type
- Type: Bicameral
- Houses: Senate; House of Representatives

Leadership
- Senate President: Bo Biteman (R) since January 14, 2025
- House Speaker: Chip Neiman (R) since January 14, 2025

Structure
- Seats: 93 voting members: 31 Senators; 62 Representatives
- Senate political groups: Majority (29): Republican (29); Minority (2): Democratic (2)
- House political groups: Majority (56): Republican (56); Minority (6): Democratic (6)
- Authority: Article III, Wyoming Constitution
- Salary: $150/day + per diem

Elections
- Last Senate election: November 5, 2024
- Last House election: November 5, 2024
- Next Senate election: November 3, 2026
- Next House election: November 3, 2026

Meeting place
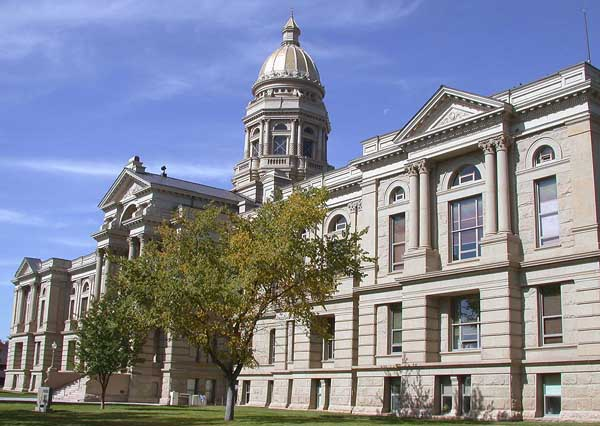
- Wyoming State Capitol; Cheyenne

Website
- https://wyoleg.gov

The Wyoming State Legislature is the legislative branch of the U.S. state of Wyoming. It is a bicameral state legislature, consisting of a 62-member Wyoming House of Representatives, and a 31-member Wyoming Senate. The legislature meets at the Wyoming State Capitol in Cheyenne. There are no term limits for either chamber.

The Republican Party holds a supermajority in the current legislature. 56 of the 62 seats in the House and 29 of the 31 seats in the Senate are held by Republicans.

== History ==
The Wyoming State Legislature began like other Western states as a territorial legislature, with nearly (though with not all) the parliamentary regulations that guide other fully-fledged state legislatures.

=== Women's Suffrage ===
During its territorial era, the Wyoming Legislature played a crucial role in the Suffragette Movement in the United States. In 1869, only four years following the American Civil War, and another 35 years before women's suffrage became a highly visible political issue in both the U.S., Britain, and elsewhere, the Wyoming Legislature granted all women above the age of 21 the right to vote. The legislature's move made Wyoming the first territory of the United States where women were explicitly granted the voting franchise. News spread quickly to other neighboring territories and states. In 1870, the Utah Territorial Legislature followed suit and granted the voting franchise to women.

The move by the legislature was motivated by a number of factors, including bringing Eastern women to the territory to increase its population (it has consistently been among the least-populated states in America), to publicize the new territory, to bring more voters into the fold (both for existing political elites and again due to its small population), and by genuine concerns that women should be allowed the vote.

Due to the territory's change of voting laws in 1869, the U.S. Congress was hostile to Wyoming and its legislature. During proceedings to make Wyoming a U.S. state in 1889 and 1890 in writing a new constitution that would continue female suffrage, Congress threatened to withhold statehood unless women's suffrage were abolished.

After the Wyoming Legislature and territorial government sent a telegram back to Washington with the ultimatum that Wyoming would remain a territory rather than become a state without women's suffrage, Congress withdrew its threat, and on July 10, 1890, President Benjamin Harrison signed into law Wyoming becoming the 44th U.S. state.

Wyoming's early entry into female politics continued into the 20th century. In 1925, Democrat Nellie Tayloe Ross became the first elected female governor of a U.S. state.

== See also ==
- Wyoming State Capitol
- Wyoming House of Representatives
- Wyoming Senate
- List of appointed members of the Wyoming Legislature
- List of Wyoming state legislatures
