= Stacy Jones (Wyoming politician) =

American politician from Wyoming

Member of the Wyoming Senate from the 13th district
- Incumbent
- Assumed office January 2, 2023
- Preceded by: Tom James

Personal details
- Born: Laramie, Wyoming
- Party: Republican
- Education: University of Wyoming

Stacy Jones is an American politician and realtor, currently serving as a member of the Wyoming Senate from the 13th district.
