= Wendy Davis Schuler =

American politician and educator

Member of the Wyoming Senate from the 15th district
- Incumbent
- Assumed office January 7, 2019
- Preceded by: Paul Barnard

Personal details
- Born: Wendy Davis Evanston, Wyoming, U.S.
- Party: Republican
- Education: University of Wyoming (BS)

Wendy Davis Schuler is an American politician and educator, currently serving as a member of the Wyoming Senate from the 15th district, which includes Uinta County.

== Early life and education ==
Schuler was born Wendy Davis in Evanston, Wyoming. She earned a Bachelor of Science degree in Education from the University of Wyoming.

== Career ==
Prior to entering politics, Schuler was a teacher in the Uinta County School District Number 1. Schuler defeated incumbent Paul Barnard in the 2018 Republican primary, and took office on January 7, 2019.
