= Wyoming Senate =

Upper house of the Wyoming state legislature

Coordinates: 41°08′25″N 104°49′13″W

Wyoming State Senate
- 68th Wyoming State Legislature

Type
- Type: Upper house
- Term limits: None

History
- New session started: January 14, 2025

Leadership
- President: Bo Biteman (R) since January 14, 2025
- Vice President: Tim Salazar (R) since January 14, 2025
- Majority Leader: Tara Nethercott (R) since January 14, 2025
- Minority Leader: Mike Gierau (D) since January 14, 2025

Structure
- Seats: 31
- Political groups: Majority: Republican (29); Minority: Democratic (2)
- Length of term: 4 years
- Authority: Article 3, Wyoming Constitution
- Salary: $150/day + per diem

Elections
- Last election: November 5, 2024 (15 seats)
- Next election: November 3, 2026 (16 seats)
- Redistricting: Legislative Control

Meeting place
- State Senate Chamber; Wyoming State Capitol; Cheyenne, Wyoming

Website
- Wyoming State Legislature

The Wyoming Senate is the upper house of the Wyoming State Legislature. There are 31 Senators in the Senate, representing an equal number of constituencies across Wyoming, each with a population of at least 17,000. The Senate meets at the Wyoming State Capitol in Cheyenne.

Members of the Senate serve four-year terms without term limits. Term limits were declared unconstitutional by the Wyoming Supreme Court in 2004, overturning a decade-old law that had restricted Senators to three terms (twelve years).

Like other upper houses of state and territorial legislatures and the federal U.S. Senate, the Wyoming Senate can confirm or reject gubernatorial appointments to the state cabinet, commissions, boards, or justices to the Wyoming Supreme Court.

== Composition of the Senate ==
Affiliation	Party (Shading indicates majority caucus)		Total	Vacant
Affiliation	Republican	Democratic	Total	Vacant
End of 67th Legislature	29	2	31 (Note: A 31st district was created during redistricting.)	0
Beginning of 68th Legislature	29	2	31	0
Latest voting share	94%	6%		

=== Leadership ===
Wyoming, along with Maine, New Hampshire, and Oregon, is one of the four U.S. states without the Office of the Lieutenant Governor, a position which for most upper houses of state legislatures and indeed for the U.S. Congress (with the Vice President) is at least the nominal head of the legislative body. Instead, a separate position of Senate President is in place, removed from the Wyoming executive branch.

The current Senate President is Republican Bo Biteman of District 21 (Ranchester).

Position	Name	Party	District
President of the Senate	Bo Biteman	Republican	21
Senate Vice President	Tim Salazar	Republican	26
Majority Leader	Tara Nethercott	Republican	4
Minority Leader	Mike Gierau	Democratic	17
Minority Whip	Chris Rothfuss	Democratic	9

=== Members of the Wyoming Senate ===
District	Name	Party	Residence	Counties	Nested House Districts	Start	Next Election
1	Ogden Driskill	Republican	Devils Tower	Campbell, Crook, Weston	HD 1, HD 52	2010	2026
2	Brian Boner	Republican	Douglas	Converse, Platte	HD 6, HD 62	2015 (Note: Originally appointed.)	2028
3	Cheri Steinmetz	Republican	Lingle	Goshen, Niobrara, Weston	HD 2, HD 5	2018	2026
4	Tara Nethercott	Republican	Cheyenne	Laramie	HD 7, HD 8	2016	2028
5	Lynn Hutchings	Republican	Cheyenne	Laramie	HD 12, HD 42	2018	2026
6	Taft Love	Republican	Cheyenne	Laramie	HD 4, HD 10	2025	2026 (special)
7	Stephan Pappas	Republican	Cheyenne	Laramie	HD 9, HD 41	2014	2026
8	Jared Olsen	Republican	Cheyenne	Laramie	HD 11, HD 44	2024	2028
9	Chris Rothfuss	Democratic	Laramie	Albany	HD 13, HD 45	2010	2026
10	Gary Crum	Republican	Laramie	Albany	HD 14, HD 46	2024	2028
11	Larry S. Hicks	Republican	Baggs	Albany, Carbon	HD 13, HD 45	2010	2026
12	John Kolb	Republican	Rock Springs	Fremont, Sweetwater	HD 17, HD 48	2020	2028
13	Stacy Jones	Republican	Rock Springs	Sweetwater	HD 39, HD 60	2022	2026
14	Laura Taliaferro Pearson	Republican	Kemmerer	Lincoln, Sublette, Sweetwater, Uinta	HD 18, HD 20	2024	2028
15	Wendy Davis Schuler	Republican	Evanston	Uinta	HD 19, HD 49	2018	2026
16	Dan Dockstader	Republican	Afton	Lincoln, Sublette, Teton	HD 21, HD 22	2008	2028
17	Mike Gierau	Democratic	Jackson Hole	Teton	HD 16, HD 23	2018	2026
18	Tim French	Republican	Powell	Park	HD 24, HD 50	2020	2028
19	Dan Laursen	Republican	Powell	Big Horn, Park	HD 25, HD 26	2014	2026
20	Ed Cooper	Republican	Ten Sleep	Big Horn, Hot Springs, Park, Washakie	HD 27, HD 28	2020	2028
21	Bo Biteman	Republican	Ranchester	Sheridan	HD 29, HD 30, HD 40, HD 51 (Note: Only two senate districts not nested.)	2018	2026
22	Barry Crago	Republican	Buffalo	Sheridan, Johnson	HD 29, HD 30, HD 40, HD 51	2024	2028
23	Eric Barlow	Republican	Gillette	Campbell	HD 3, HD 31	2022	2026
24	Troy McKeown	Republican	Gillette	Campbell	HD 32, HD 53	2020	2028
25	Cale Case	Republican	Lander	Fremont	HD 33, HD 54	1998	2026
26	Tim Salazar	Republican	Riverton	Fremont	HD 34, HD 55	2020	2028
27	Bill Landen	Republican	Casper	Natrona	HD 35, HD 36	2007	2026
28	James Anderson	Republican	Casper	Natrona	HD 56, HD 57	2012	2028
29	Bob Ide	Republican	Casper	Natrona	HD 37, HD 59	2022	2026
30	Charles Scott	Republican	Casper	Natrona	HD 38, HD 58	1982	2028
31	Evie Brennan	Republican	Cheyenne	Laramie	HD 43, HD 61	2022	2026

=== Current committees and members ===
==== Judiciary ====
Chairman

▌Jared Olsen

Members

▌Barry Crago
▌Gary Crum
▌Larry Hicks
▌John Kolb

==== Appropriations ====
Chairman

▌Tim Salazar

Members

▌Ogden Driskill
▌Mike Gierau
▌Dan Laursen
▌Darin Smith

==== Revenue ====
Chairman

▌Troy McKeown

Members

▌Cale Case
▌Tim French
▌Bob Ide
▌Stephan Pappas

==== Education ====
Chairman

▌Wendy Schuler

Members

▌Evie Brennan
▌Jared Olsen
▌Chris Rothfuss
▌Charles Scott

==== Agriculture, State and Public Lands & Water Resources ====
Chairman

▌Tim French

Members

▌Barry Crago
▌Bob Ide
▌Troy McKeown
▌Laura Pearson

==== Travel, Recreation, Wildlife & Cultural Resources ====
Chairman

▌Bill Landen

Members

▌Brian Boner
▌Larry Hicks
▌Stacy Jones
▌Wendy Schuler

==== Corporations, Elections & Political Subdivisions ====
Chairman

▌Cale Case

Members

▌Brian Boner
▌Dan Dockstader
▌Bill Landen
▌Cheri Steinmetz

==== Transportation, Highways & Military Affairs ====
Chairman

▌Stephan Pappas

Members

▌Jim Anderson
▌Evie Brennan
▌Ed Cooper
▌John Kolb

==== Minerals, Business & Economic Development ====
Chairman

▌Jim Anderson

Members

▌Ed Cooper
▌Stacy Jones
▌Tara Nethercott
▌Chris Rothfuss

==== Labor, Health & Social Services ====
Chairman

▌Eric Barlow

Members

▌Gary Crum
▌Lynn Hutchings
▌Charles Scott
▌Cheri Steinmetz

==== Journal ====
Chairman

▌Gary Crum

Members

▌Mike Gierau

==== Rules & Procedure ====
Chairman

▌Bo Biteman

Members

▌Mike Gierau
▌Tara Nethercott
▌Chris Rothfuss
▌Tim Salazar

== History ==
=== Women in the Senate ===
Senator	Party	Residence	Senate Term	Notes
Dora McGrath	Republican	Thermopolis	1931–1933	First woman in the Wyoming Senate
Willa Wales Corbitt	Democratic	Riverton	1965-1969	
Edness Kimball Wilkins	Democratic	Casper	1967-1973	First woman to serve as Speaker of the Wyoming House of Representatives
June Boyle	Democratic	Laramie	1973–1985	
Catherine Parks	Republican	Gillette	1979–1985	
Win Hickey	Democratic	Cheyenne	1981–1991	
Lisa F. Kinney	Democratic	Laramie	1985–1995	
Della Herbst	Democratic	Sheridan	1987–1993	
Harriet Elizabeth Byrd	Democratic	Cheyenne	1989–1993	First African-American to serve in the State Legislature
Susan C. Anderson	Democratic	Casper	1993–1995	
April Brimmer-Kunz	Republican	Cheyenne	1993–2005	First female President of the Senate
Barbara Cubin	Republican	Casper	1993–1995	Resigned to become U.S. Representative
Cynthia Lummis	Republican	Cheyenne	1993–1995	Later served as State Treasurer, U.S. Representative, and U.S. Senator
Mary MacGuire	Republican	Casper	1993–1995	Son Joe MacGuire currently serves in the Wyoming House of Representatives
Irene Devin	Republican	Laramie	1997–2005	
Rae Lynn Job	Democratic	Rock Springs	1997–2009	
E. Jayne Mockler	Democratic	Cheyenne	1997–2009	
Kathryn Sessions	Democratic	Cheyenne	1999–2011	
Jana H. Ginter	Democratic	Cheyenne	2004–2005	
Patricia Aullman	Republican	Thayne	2005–2009	
Saundra Meyer	Democratic	Evanston	2009–2011	
Leslie Nutting	Republican	Cheyenne	2011–2015	
Bernadine Craft	Democratic	Rock Springs	2013–2017	
Liisa Anselmi-Dalton	Democratic	Rock Springs	2017–2021	
Affie Ellis	Republican	Cheyenne	2017–2025	Member of the Navajo Nation, first Native American to serve in the Wyoming Senate.
Tara Nethercott	Republican	Cheyenne	2017–present	
Wendy Davis Schuler	Republican	Evanston	2019–present	
Lynn Hutchings	Republican	Cheyenne	2019–present	
Cheri Steinmetz	Republican	Lingle	2019–present	
Evie Brennan	Republican	Cheyenne	2023–present	
Stacy Jones	Republican	Rock Springs	2023–present	
Laura Taliaferro Pearson	Republican	Kemmerer	2025–present	

== Past composition of the Senate ==
=== Recent composition ===
Affiliation	Party (Shading indicates majority caucus)		Total	
Affiliation	Republican	Democratic	Total	Vacant
57th Legislature (2003–2004)	20	10	30	0
58th Legislature (2005–2006)	23	7	30	0
59th Legislature (2007–2008)	23	7	30	0
60th Legislature (2009–2010)	23	7	30	0
61st Legislature (2011–2012)	26	4	30	0
62nd Legislature (2013–2014)	26	4	30	0
63rd Legislature (2015–2016)	26	4	30	0
64th Legislature (2017–2018)	27	3	30	0
65th Legislature (2019–2020)	27	3	30	0
66th Legislature (2021–2022)	28	2	30	0
67th Legislature (2023–2024)	29	2	31 (Note: A 31st district was created during redistricting.)	0

=== Historical composition ===
Wyoming Territorial Council, 1869–1890

Dem. / Pop. / Rep.			Total
1st	1869	9	9
2nd	1871	1 / 5 / 3	9
3rd	1873	4 / 5	9
4th	1875	11 / 2	13
5th	1877	9 / 4	13
6th	1879	8 / 5	13
7th	1882	8 / 4	12
8th	1884	8 / 4	12
9th	1886	4 / 8	12
10th	1888	1 / 3 / 8	12
11th	1890	7 / 5	12

Wyoming Senate, 1890–present

Dem. / Pop. / Rep. / Slv. Dem.			Total
1st	1890	3 / 13	16
2nd	1892	5 / 11	16
3rd	1894	4 / 14	18
4th	1896	4 / 1 / 14	19
5th	1898	6 / 13	19
6th	1900	1 / 2 / 16	19
7th	1902	2 / 21	23
8th	1904	3 / 29	23
9th	1906	2 / 21	23
10th	1908	3 / 24	27
11th	1910	6 / 21	27
12th	1912	8 / 19	27
13th	1914	8 / 19	27
14th	1916	11 / 16	27
15th	1918	10 / 17	27
16th	1920	3 / 22	25
17th	1922	5 / 20	25
18th	1924	11 / 16	27
19th	1926	12 / 15	27
20th	1928	10 / 17	27
21st	1930	6 / 21	27
22nd	1932	12 / 15	27
23rd	1934	14 / 13	27
24th	1936	16 / 11	27
25th	1938	11 / 16	27
26th	1940	11 / 16	27
27th	1942	10 / 17	27
28th	1944	6 / 21	27
29th	1946	8 / 19	27
30th	1948	9 / 18	27
31st	1950	10 / 17	27
32nd	1952	6 / 21	27
33rd	1954	8 / 19	27
34th	1956	11 / 16	27
35th	1958	11 / 16	27
36th	1960	10 / 17	27
37th	1962	11 / 16	27
38th	1964	12 / 13	25
39th	1966	12 / 18	30
40th	1968	12 / 18	30
41st	1970	11 / 19	30
42nd	1972	13 / 17	30
43rd	1974	15* / 15	30
44th	1976	12 / 18	30
45th	1978	11 / 19	30
46th	1980	11 / 19	30
47th	1982	11 / 19	30
48th	1984	11 / 19	30
49th	1986	11 / 19	30
50th	1988	11 / 19	30
51st	1990	10 / 20	30
52nd	1992	10 / 20	30
53rd	1994	10 / 20	30
54th	1996	9 / 21	30
55th	1998	10 / 20	30
56th	2000	10 / 20	30
57th	2002	10 / 20	30
58th	2004	7 / 23	30
59th	2006	7 / 23	30
60th	2008	7 / 23	30
61st	2010	4 / 26	30
62nd	2012	4 / 26	30
63rd	2014	4 / 26	30
64th	2016	3 / 27	30
65th	2018	3 / 27	30
66th	2020	2 / 28	30
67th	2022	2 / 29	31
68th	2024	2 / 29	31

== See also ==
- Wyoming State Capitol
- Wyoming State Legislature
- Wyoming House of Representatives
- List of Wyoming state legislatures
- List of Wyoming Senate districts
