= Bill Landen =

American politician

Member of the Wyoming Senate from the 27th district
- Incumbent
- Assumed office 2007
- Preceded by: John Barrasso
- Succeeded by: Kevin Helling (elect)

Personal details
- Born: February 21, 1956 (age 70)
- Party: Republican

Bill Landen (born February 21, 1956) is a Republican member of the Wyoming Senate, representing the 27th district since 2007. The 27th district represents Natrona County, Wyoming. He currently serves as a member of the Senate Natural Resources and Infrastructure Committee, Multistate Highway Transportation Agreement Cooperating Committee, Select Committee on School Facilities, and Travel, Recreation, Wildlife & Cultural Committee, He is a chairman in the Capitol Interpretive Exhibits and Way-finding Subcommittee, the Air Transportation Liaison Committee, and the Transportation, Highways, & Military Affairs Committee. Landen has attended Casper College, which he received an associate degree from, University of Wyoming for his Bachelors of Science, and Colorado State where he attended graduate school.
