= Larry S. Hicks =

American politician

Larry Hicks

Majority Leader of the Wyoming Senate
- In office January 10, 2023 – January 14, 2025
- Preceded by: Ogden Driskill
- Succeeded by: Tara Nethercott

Vice President of the Wyoming Senate
- In office January 12, 2021 – January 10, 2023
- Preceded by: Ogden Driskill
- Succeeded by: Dave Kinskey

Member of the Wyoming Senate from the 11th district
- Incumbent
- Assumed office January 2011
- Preceded by: James Elliott

Personal details
- Born: December 30, 1958 (age 67) Powell, Wyoming, U.S.
- Party: Republican
- Education: Northwest College; University of Wyoming (BS, PhD); Montana State University (MS)

Larry Hicks (born 1958) is an American politician who is a Republican member of the Wyoming Senate, representing the 11th district since 2011. The 11th district includes Albany and Carbon Counties.

In 2025, he sponsored a bill to implement a five-year moratorium on wind and solar energy projects in the state of Wyoming. The bill was voted down in committee.

Hicks describes himself as a "free-market capitalist".

Wyoming Senate
Preceded by Ogden Driskill	Vice President of the Wyoming Senate; 2021–2023	Succeeded by Dave Kinskey
Preceded by Ogden Driskill	Majority Leader of the Wyoming Senate; 2023–2025	Succeeded by Tara Nethercott
