= Ogden Driskill =

American politician (born 1959)

President of the Wyoming Senate
- In office January 10, 2023 – January 14, 2025
- Preceded by: Dan Dockstader
- Succeeded by: Bo Biteman

Majority Leader of the Wyoming Senate
- In office January 12, 2021 – January 10, 2023
- Preceded by: Dan Dockstader
- Succeeded by: Larry Hicks

Vice President of the Wyoming Senate
- In office January 7, 2019 – January 12, 2021
- Preceded by: Michael Von Flatern
- Succeeded by: Larry Hicks

Member of the Wyoming Senate from the 1st district
- Incumbent
- Assumed office January 11, 2011
- Preceded by: Charles Townsend

Personal details
- Born: July 24, 1959 (age 67) Belle Fourche, South Dakota, U.S.
- Party: Republican
- Spouse: Rosanne
- Children: 3
- Education: Casper College; University of Wyoming

Ogden Driskill (born July 24, 1959) is a Republican member of the Wyoming Senate, representing the 1st district since 2011. Senate District 1 is the largest in Wyoming in geographic terms. He is a member of the Wyoming Senate Wyoming Wildlife Taskforce, Wyoming Gaming Commission, State Building Commission Liaison, Energy Council, Select Water Committee, Select Committee on Capitol Financing & Investments, Senate Rules & Procedure, and Management Council. He is also the Chair of the Senate Corporations, Elections, & Political Subdivisions Committee.

Wyoming Senate
Preceded by Michael Von Flatern	Vice President of the Wyoming Senate; 2019–2021	Succeeded by Larry Hicks
Preceded by Dan Dockstader	Majority Leader of the Wyoming Senate; 2021–2023	Succeeded by Larry Hicks
Preceded by Dan Dockstader	President of the Wyoming Senate; 2023–2025	Succeeded by Bo Biteman
