= Bob Ide =

American politician from Wyoming

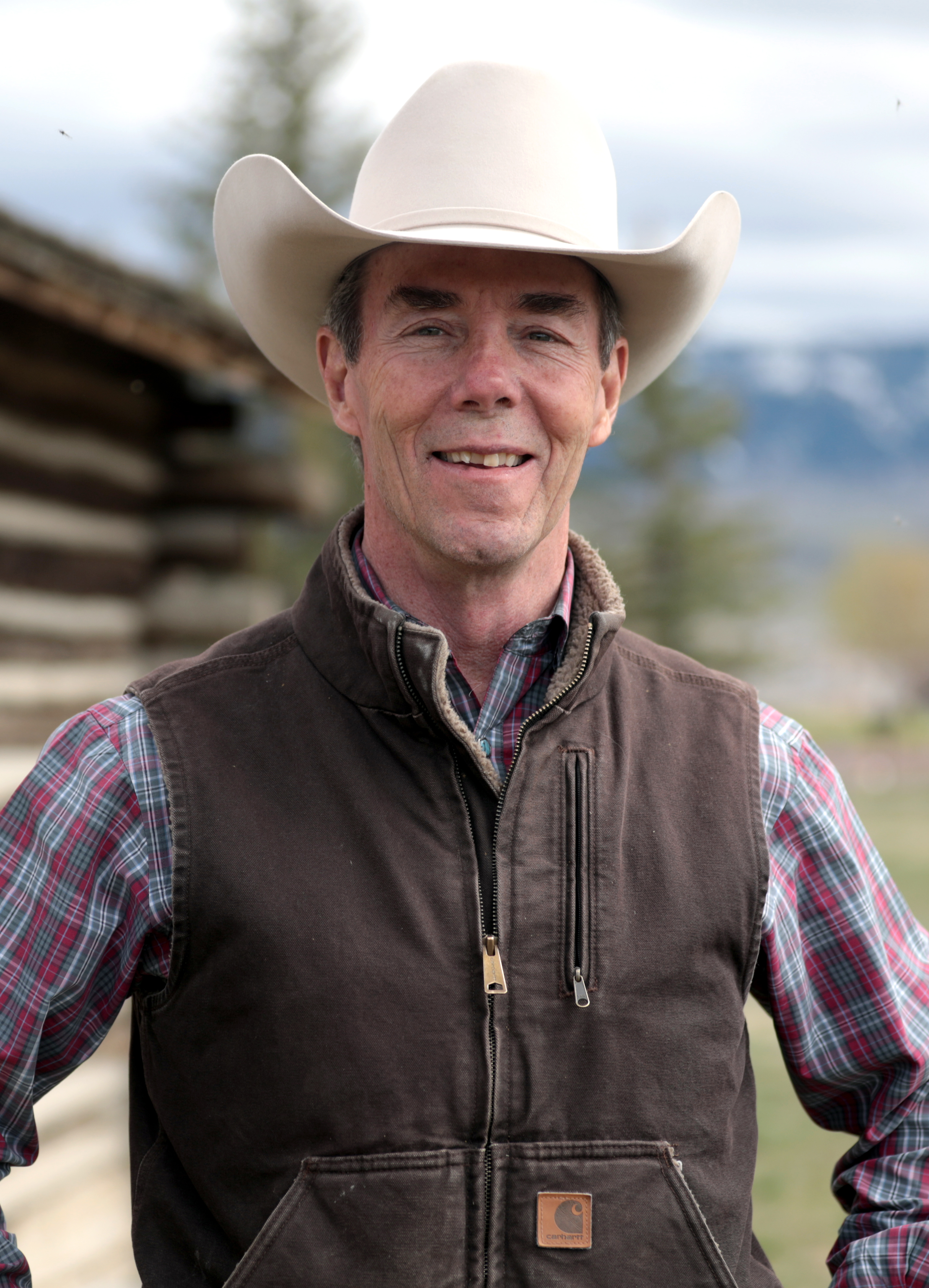

Member of the Wyoming Senate from the 29th district
- Incumbent
- Assumed office December 6, 2022
- Preceded by: Drew Perkins
- Succeeded by: Lisa Engebretsen (elect)

Personal details
- Born: Boulder, Colorado
- Party: Republican
- Education: University of Wyoming

Robert "Bob" Ide is an American politician and commercial real estate developer who has served as a member of the Wyoming Senate from the 29th district since his appointment by Natrona County Commission on December 6, 2022.

== Career ==
Ide is a businessperson in the real estate industry. In 2022, he defeated incumbent Republican Drew Perkins in the primary election. His candidacy was endorsed by former congressman Ron Paul. Following primary defeat, Perkins resigned from office. Following Ide's victory in the general election, he was appointed by the county commission to serve Perkins' unexpired term.
