= Stephan Pappas =

American politician

Member of the Wyoming Senate from the 7th district
- Incumbent
- Assumed office January 5, 2015
- Preceded by: Leslie J. Nutting
- Succeeded by: Mark Rinne (elect)

Personal details
- Born: December 14, 1950 (age 75) Cheyenne, Wyoming, U.S.
- Party: Republican
- Spouse: Kay Pappas
- Children: 3
- Education: University of New Mexico; Arizona State University
- Profession: Architect; Brigadier General, USAF (Retired)

Stephan Pappas (born December 14, 1950) is an American politician and a Republican member of the Wyoming State Senate, representing the 7th district since January 5, 2015.

== Elections ==
=== 2014 ===
Incumbent Republican State Senator Leslie Nutting retired after serving one term. Pappas ran unopposed in the Republican primary, and defeated Democratic nominee Dameione Cameron, 59% to 41%. He took office on January 5, 2015.

== Early life and education ==
Pappas was born in Cheyenne, Wyoming, in 1950, the son of Theoni B; (Harrison) and Andrew S. Pappas. He is of Greek descent. He graduated from East High School in Cheyenne, WY in 1969. He then attended the University of New Mexico where he obtained a bachelor's degree in fine arts in 1973. He continued his education at the University of Arizona obtaining a Bachelors of Architecture degree in 1978.
