= Wyoming Republican Party =

Wyoming affiliate of the Republican Party

- Chairperson: W. Frank Eathorne
- Governor of Wyoming: Mark Gordon
- Secretary of State of Wyoming: Chuck Gray
- Headquarters: 1714 Capitol Avenue, Cheyenne, Wyoming 82001
- Membership (August 27, 2025): 256,308
- Ideology: Conservatism
- Political position: Right-wing
- National affiliation: Republican Party
- Colors: Red
- Wyoming Senate: 29 / 31
- Wyoming House of Representatives: 56 / 62
- United States Senate: 2 / 2
- United States House of Representatives: 1 / 1
- Statewide Executive Offices: 5 / 5

Election symbol

Website
- www.wyoming.gop

The Wyoming Republican Party is the affiliate of the Republican Party in Wyoming. It is currently the dominant party in the state, and is one of the strongest affiliates of the national Republican Party. The party currently controls Wyoming's at-large U.S. House seat, both U.S. Senate seats, the governorship, and has nearly unanimous positions in both houses of the state legislature.

In 2021, the Wyoming Republican Party voted to stop recognizing Liz Cheney as a Republican. Cheney had criticized former president Donald Trump for attempting to overturn the 2020 election results after he lost the election and inciting a pro-Trump mob to assault the U.S. Capitol. In 2022, the Wyoming Republican Party supported a primary challenger (Harriet Hageman) against Cheney.

== Members of Congress ==
=== U.S. Senate ===
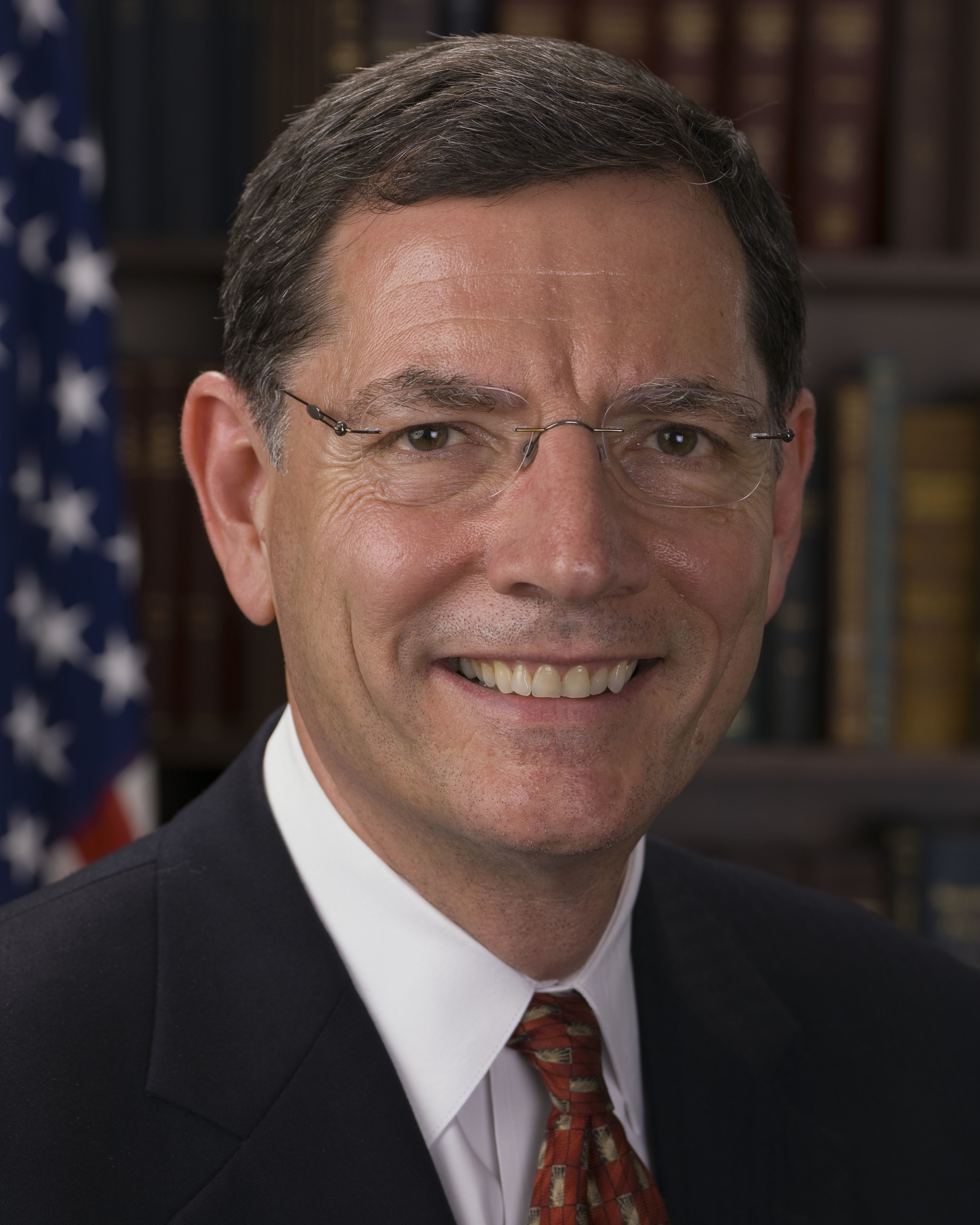
Senior U.S. Senator John Barrasso

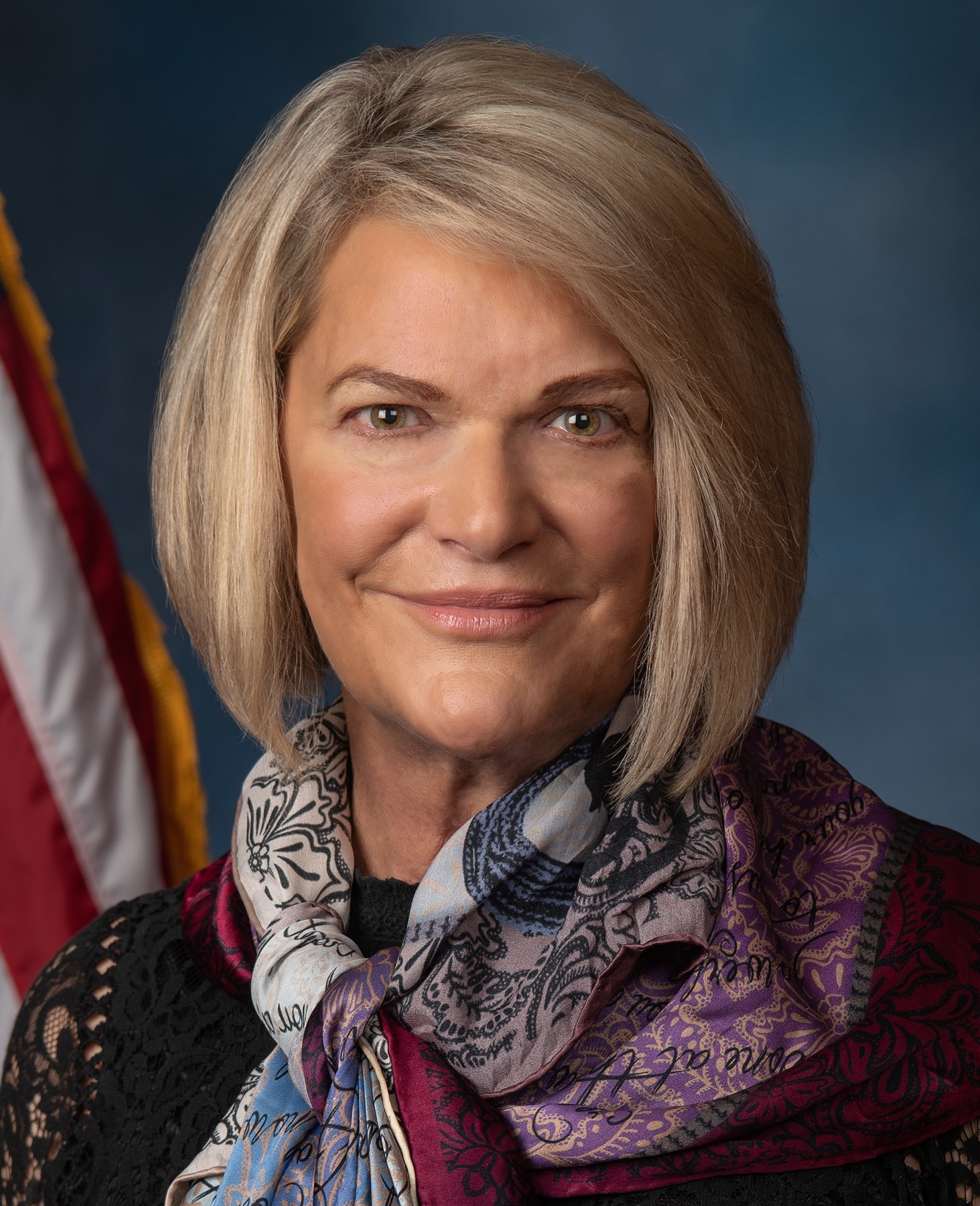
Junior U.S. Senator Cynthia Lummis

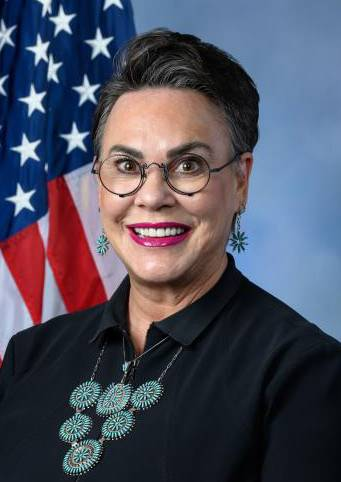
Pre-junior U.S. Senator-elect Harriet Hageman

=== U.S. House of Representatives ===
District	Member	Photo
At-large	Harriet Hageman	
At-large	Chuck Gray (elect)	

== Statewide offices ==
- Governor: Mark Gordon → Eric Barlow (elect)
- Secretary of State: Chuck Gray → Robert Short (elect)
- State Auditor: Kristi Racines
- State Treasurer: Curt Meier
- Superintendent of Public Instruction: Megan Degenfelder

== Legislative leaders ==
- President of the Senate: Drew Perkins
  - Senate Majority Leader: Dan Dockstader
- Speaker of the House: Steve Harshman
  - House Majority Leader: David Miller

== Election results ==
=== Presidential ===
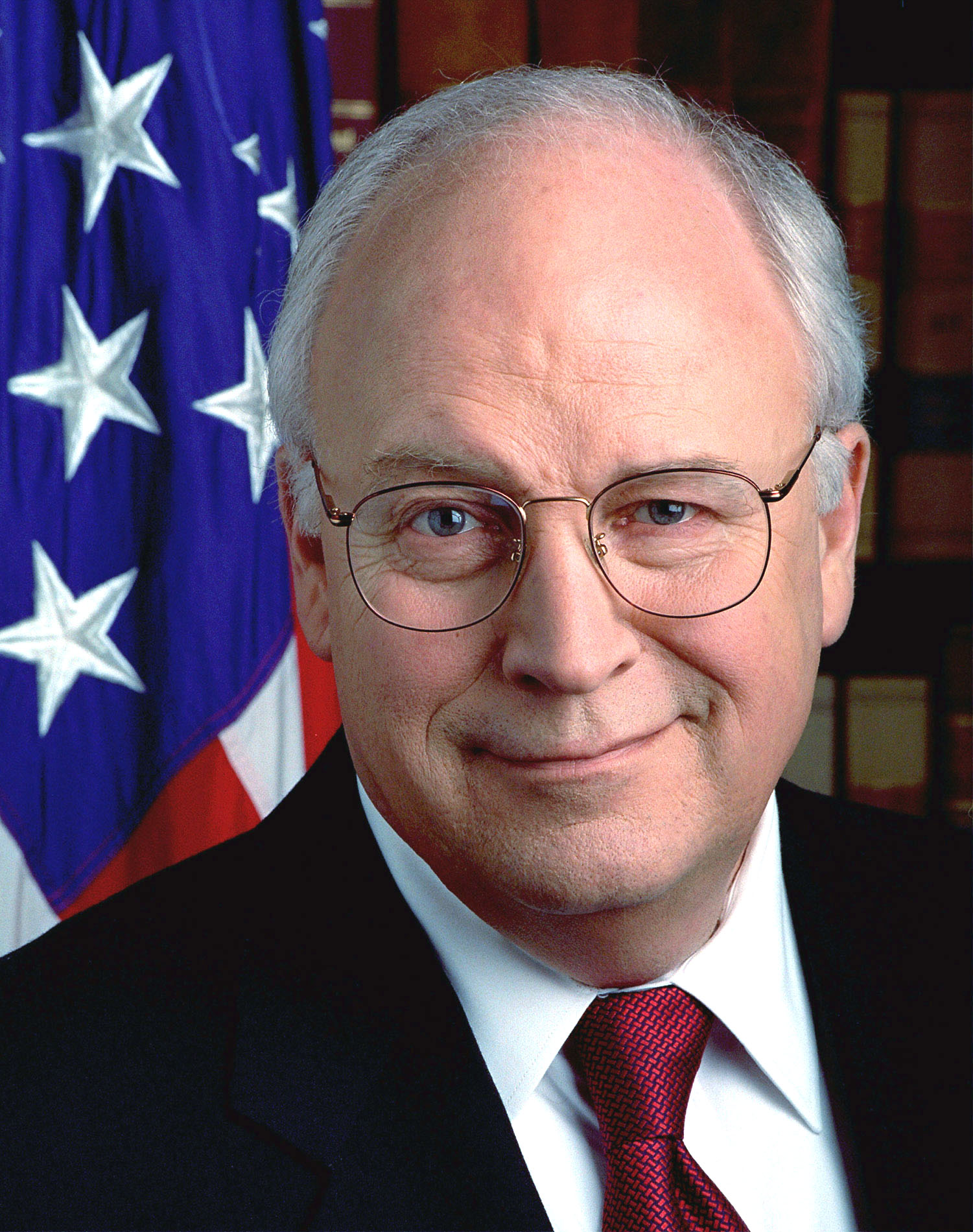
Former Vice President Dick Cheney of Wyoming

Wyoming Republican Party presidential election results
Election	Presidential Ticket	Votes	Vote %	Electoral votes	Result
1892	Benjamin Harrison/Whitelaw Reid	8,454	50.52%	3 / 3	Lost
1896	William McKinley/Garret Hobart	10,072	47.75%	0 / 3	Won
1900	William McKinley/Theodore Roosevelt	14,482	58.66%	3 / 3	Won
1904	Theodore Roosevelt/Charles W. Fairbanks	20,846	66.72%	3 / 3	Won
1908	William Howard Taft/James S. Sherman	20,846	55.43%	3 / 3	Won
1912	William Howard Taft/Nicholas M. Butler	14,560	34.42%	0 / 3	Lost
1916	Charles E. Hughes/Charles W. Fairbanks	21,698	41.86%	0 / 3	Lost
1920	Warren G. Harding/Calvin Coolidge	35,091	64.15%	3 / 3	Won
1924	Calvin Coolidge/Charles G. Dawes	41,858	52.39%	3 / 3	Won
1928	Herbert Hoover/Charles Curtis	52,748	63.68%	3 / 3	Won
1932	Herbert Hoover/Charles Curtis	39,583	40.82%	0 / 3	Lost
1936	Alf Landon/Frank Knox	38,739	37.47%	0 / 3	Lost
1940	Wendell Willkie/Charles L. McNary	52,633	46.89%	0 / 3	Lost
1944	Thomas E. Dewey/John W. Bricker	51,921	51.23%	3 / 3	Lost
1948	Thomas E. Dewey/Earl Warren	47,947	47.27%	0 / 3	Lost
1952	Dwight D. Eisenhower/Richard Nixon	81,049	62.71%	3 / 3	Won
1956	Dwight D. Eisenhower/Richard Nixon	74,573	60.08%	3 / 3	Won
1960	Richard Nixon/Henry Cabot Lodge Jr.	77,451	55.01%	3 / 3	Lost
1964	Barry Goldwater/William E. Miller	61,998	43.44%	0 / 3	Lost
1968	Richard Nixon/Spiro Agnew	70,927	55.76%	3 / 3	Won
1972	Richard Nixon/Spiro Agnew	100,464	69.01%	3 / 3	Won
1976	Gerald Ford/Bob Dole	92,717	59.30%	3 / 3	Lost
1980	Ronald Reagan/George H. W. Bush	110,700	62.64%	3 / 3	Won
1984	Ronald Reagan/George H. W. Bush	133,241	70.51%	3 / 3	Won
1988	George H. W. Bush/Dan Quayle	106,867	60.53%	3 / 3	Won
1992	George H. W. Bush/Dan Quayle	79,347	39.70%	3 / 3	Lost
1996	Bob Dole/Jack Kemp	105,388	49.81%	3 / 3	Lost
2000	George W. Bush/Dick Cheney	147,947	67.76%	3 / 3	Won
2004	George W. Bush/Dick Cheney	167,629	68.86%	3 / 3	Won
2008	John McCain/Sarah Palin	164,958	64.78%	3 / 3	Lost
2012	Mitt Romney/Paul Ryan	170,962	68.64%	3 / 3	Lost
2016	Donald Trump/Mike Pence	174,419	68.17%	3 / 3	Won
2020	Donald Trump/Mike Pence	193,559	69.94%	3 / 3	Lost
2024	Donald Trump/JD Vance	192,633	71.60%	3 / 3	Won

=== Gubernatorial ===
Wyoming Republican Party gubernatorial election results
Election	Gubernatorial candidate	Votes	Vote %	Result
1890	Francis E. Warren	8,879	55.38%	Won ✓
1892 (special)	Edward Ivinson	7,509	43.52%	Lost ✗
1894	William A. Richards	10,149	52.61%	Won ✓
1898	DeForest Richards	10,383	52.43%	Won ✓
1902	DeForest Richards	14,483	57.81%	Won ✓
1904 (special)	Bryant B. Brooks	17,765	57.48%	Won ✓
1906	Bryant B. Brooks	16,317	60.20%	Won ✓
1910	William E. Mullen	15,235	40.17%	Lost ✗
1914	Hilliard S. Ridgely	19,174	44.20%	Lost ✗
1918	Robert D. Carey	23,825	56.11%	Won ✓
1922	John W. Hay	30,387	49.41%	Lost ✗
1924 (special)	E. J. Sullivan	35,275	44.88%	Lost ✗
1926	Frank Emerson	35,651	50.90%	Won ✓
1930	Frank Emerson	38,058	50.58%	Won ✓
1932 (special)	Harry R. Weston	44,692	47.22%	Lost ✗
1934	Alonzo M. Clark	38,792	41.36%	Lost ✗
1938	Nels H. Smith	57,288	59.81%	Won ✓
1942	Nels H. Smith	37,568	48.68%	Lost ✗
1946	Earl Wright	38,333	47.12%	Lost ✗
1950	Frank A. Barrett	54,441	56.15%	Won ✓
1954	Milward Simpson	56,275	50.50%	Won ✓
1958	Milward Simpson	52,488	46.64%	Lost ✗
1962	Clifford Hansen	64,970	54.47%	Won ✓
1966	Stanley Hathaway	65,624	54.29%	Won ✓
1970	Stanley Hathaway	74,249	62.79%	Won ✓
1974	Dick Jones	56,645	44.12%	Lost ✗
1978	John Ostlund	67,595	49.14%	Lost ✗
1982	Warren A. Morton	62,128	36.86%	Lost ✗
1986	Pete Simpson	75,841	46.04%	Lost ✗
1990	Mary Mead	55,471	34.65%	Lost ✗
1994	Jim Geringer	104,638	58.72%	Won ✓
1998	Jim Geringer	97,235	55.60%	Won ✓
2002	Eli Bebout	88,873	47.92%	Lost ✗
2006	Ray Hunkins	58,100	30.01%	Lost ✗
2010	Matt Mead	123,780	65.68%	Won ✓
2014	Matt Mead	99,700	59.39%	Won ✓
2018	Mark Gordon	136,412	67.12%	Won ✓
2022	Mark Gordon	143,696	74.07%	Won ✓

== See also ==
- List of state parties of the Republican Party (United States)
- Political party strength in Wyoming
- Wyoming Democratic Party
- Libertarian Party of Wyoming
