= 2002 Wyoming Senate election =

- November 5, 2002

15 of 30 seats in the Wyoming Senate Odd-numbered seats up
	Majority party	Minority party
Leader	Hank Coe	Rich Cathcart
Party	Republican	Democratic
Leader's seat	18th district	6th district
Seats before	20	10
Seats after	20	10
Seat change	Steady	Steady
Popular vote	57,403	21,245
Percentage	72.99%	27.01%
- Results by district
Senate President before election
Hank Coe
Republican
Elected Senate President
April Brimmer-Kunz
Republican

The 2002 Wyoming Senate election was held on November 5, 2002, to elect members to the Wyoming Senate for its 57th session as part of the 2002 United States elections. Partisan primaries were held on August 20. All odd-numbered seats were up for election. Neither party made any gains in the chamber. Of the fifteen seats up for election, only four saw Republicans and Democrats compete.

== Predictions ==
Source	Ranking	As of
The Cook; Political Report	Safe R	October 4, 2002

== Overview ==
General election summary
Party	Candidates	Votes	%	Seats				
Party	Candidates	Votes	%	Before 56th Leg.	Up	Won	After 57th Leg.	+/–
Republican	13	57,403	72.99	20	10	10	20	Steady
Democratic	6	21,245	27.01	10	5	5	10	Steady
Total		78,648	100%	30	15		30	Steady

†: Incumbent did not run for reelection.

District	Incumbent	Party	Elected Senator	Party
1st	Bill Barton	Rep	Bill Barton	Rep
3rd	Curt Meier	Rep	Curt Meier	Rep
5th	John G. Hanes	Rep	John G. Hanes	Rep
7th	Kathryn Sessions	Dem	Kathryn Sessions	Dem
9th	Mike Massie	Dem	Mike Massie	Dem
11th	Bill Vasey	Dem	Bill Vasey	Dem
13th	Tex Boggs	Dem	Tex Boggs	Dem
15th	Ken Decaria	Dem	Ken Decaria	Dem
17th	Grant Larson	Rep	Grant Larson	Rep
19th	Carroll S. Miller †	Rep	Laness Northrup	Rep
21st	Tom Kinnison †	Rep	Bruce Burns	Rep
23rd	Steven Youngbauer †	Rep	John Hines	Rep
25th	Cale Case	Rep	Cale Case	Rep
27th	Bruce A. Hinchey	Rep	John Barrasso	Rep
29th	Bill Hawks	Rep	Bill Hawks	Rep
