= 1998 Wyoming Senate election =

- November 3, 1998

15 of 30 seats in the Wyoming Senate Odd-numbered seats up
	Majority party	Minority party
Leader	Bob Grieve (retiring)	Guy Cameron (retiring)
Party	Republican	Democratic
Leader's seat	11th district	7th district
Seats before	21	9
Seats after	20	10
Seat change	▼1	▲1
Popular vote	61,035	17,096
Percentage	78.12%	21.88%
Senate President before election
Bob Grieve
Republican
Elected Senate President
Jim Twiford
Republican

The 1998 Wyoming Senate election was held on November 3, 1998, to elect members to the Wyoming Senate for its 55th session as part of the 1998 United States elections. Partisan primaries were held on August 18. All odd-numbered seats were up for election. Republicans flipped one Democratic seat and Democrats flipped two Republican seats, leading to one net seat gained for the Democrats.

The election was held concurrently with elections for the state house, U.S. Representative, governor along with every other statewide executive offices.

== Results ==
=== Summary ===
Party	Candidates			Seats
Party	Num.	Vote	%	Before	Up	Won	After	+/–
Republicans	15	61,035	78.12	21	11	10	20	▼1
Democrats	6	17,096	21.88	9	4	5	10	▲1

District	Incumbent		Elected		Result	Notes
District	Party	Senator	Party	Senator		Notes
SD 1	Rep.	Bill Barton	Rep.	Bill Barton	Rep hold.
SD 3	Rep.	Curt Meier	Rep.	Curt Meier	Rep hold.
SD 5	Rep.	Donald Lawler	Rep.	John Hanes	Rep hold.
SD 7	Dem.	Guy Cameron	Dem.	Kathryn Sessions	Dem hold.
SD 9	Rep.	Vincent Picard	Dem.	Mike Massie	Dem gain.	Incumbent defeated in general election.
SD 11	Rep.	Bob Grieve	Dem.	Bill Vasey	Dem gain.	Incumbent retired to run for auditor.
SD 13	Dem.	Raymond Sarcletti	Dem.	Tex Boggs	Dem hold.
SD 15	Dem.	Gregory Phillips	Dem.	Ken Decaria	Dem hold.
SD 17	Rep.	Grant Larson	Rep.	Grant Larson	Rep hold.
SD 19	Rep.	Carroll Miller	Rep.	Carroll Miller	Rep hold.
SD 21	Rep.	Tom Kinnison	Rep.	Tom Kinnison	Rep hold.
SD 23	Rep.	Larry Gilbertz	Rep.	Steven Youngbauer	Rep hold.
SD 25	Dem.	John Vinich	Rep.	Cale Case	Rep gain.	Incumbent retired to run for governor.
SD 27	Rep.	Gail Zimmerman	Rep.	Bruce Hinchey	Rep hold.
SD 29	Rep.	Bill Hawks	Rep.	Bill Hawks	Rep hold.

== Detailed results ==
=== General election ===
In most districts, the general election was not very competitive, as only six out of fifteen were contested, and only two were decided by a margin of fewer than fifteen points.

District	Republicans			Democrats			Total
District	Candidate	Vote	%	Candidate	Vote	%	Total	Maj.	%
SD 1	Bill Barton	4,112	63.93	Dana Mann-Tavegla	2,320	36.07	6,432	+1,792	+27.86
SD 3	Curt Meier	5,760	100.00	—	—	—	5,760	+5,760	+100.00
SD 5	John Hanes	4,496	100.00	—	—	—	4,496	+4,496	+100.00
SD 7	Ed Prosser	2,203	45.16	Kathryn Sessions	2,675	54.84	4,878	-472	-9.68
SD 9	Vincent Picard	1,771	38.33	Mike Massie	2,850	61.67	4,621	-1,079	-23.34
SD 11	Gary Graalman	2,482	43.87	Bill Vasey	3,176	56.13	5,658	-694	-12.26
SD 13	Linda Taliaferro	1,846	37.80	Tex Boggs	3,038	62.20	4,884	-1,192	-24.41
SD 15	Gordon Park	2,037	40.15	Ken Decaria	3,037	59.85	5,074	-1,000	-19.71
SD 17	Grant Larson	7,604	100.00	—	—	—	7,604	+7,604	+100.00
SD 19	Carroll Miller	5,093	100.00	—	—	—	5,093	+5,093	+100.00
SD 21	Tom Kinnison	4,983	100.00	—	—	—	4,983	+4,983	+100.00
SD 23	Steve Youngbauer	3,881	100.00	—	—	—	3,881	+3,881	+100.00
SD 25	Cale Case	5,472	100.00	—	—	—	5,472	+5,472	+100.00
SD 27	Bruce Hinchey	4,614	100.00	—	—	—	4,614	+4,614	+100.00
SD 29	Bill Hawks	4,681	100.00	—	—	—	4,681	+4,681	+100.00

=== Republican primaries ===
Races in which no candidates filed will not be shown.

District	Winners			Runners-up						Total
District	Candidate	Vote	%	Candidate	Vote	%	Candidate	Vote	%	Total	Maj.	%
SD 1	Bill Barton	3,857	99.13	Write-ins	34	0.87	—	—	—	3,891	3,823	98.25
SD 3	Curt Meier	2,304	61.37	Chuck Brown	1,450	38.63	—	—	—	3,754	854	22.75
SD 5	John Hanes	1,620	68.59	Russ Brown	742	31.41	—	—	—	2,362	+878	+37.17
SD 7	Ed Prosser	1,408	100.00	—	—	—	—	—	—	1,408	1,408	100.00
SD 9	Vincent Picard	792	100.00	—	—	—	—	—	—	792	792	100.00
SD 11	Gary Graalman	1,576	100.00	—	—	—	—	—	—	1,576	1,576	100.00
SD 13	Linda Taliaferro	918	100.00	—	—	—	—	—	—	918	918	100.00
SD 15	Gordon Park	1,972	97.43	Write-ins	52	2.57	—	—	—	2,024	1,920	94.86
SD 17	Grant Larson	1,311	99.92	Write-ins	1	0.08	—	—	—	1,312	1,310	99.85
SD 19	Carroll Miller	2,047	52.66	Kent Bailey	1,181	30.38	Lynn Garrett	659	16.95	3,887	866	22.28
SD 21	Tom Kinnison	1,659	52.72	Jerry Saunders	1,488	47.28	—	—	—	3,147	171	5.43
SD 23	Steve Youngbauer	1,923	64.75	Daly	1,047	35.25	—	—	—	2,970	876	29.49
SD 25	Cale Case	2,689	99.48	Write-ins	14	0.52	—	—	—	2,703	2,675	98.96
SD 27	Bruce Hinchey	2,282	99.52	Write-ins	11	0.48	—	—	—	2,293	2,271	99.04
SD 29	Bill Hawks	2,433	99.55	Write-ins	11	0.45	—	—	—	2,444	2,422	99.10

=== Democratic primaries ===
Races in which no candidates filed will not be shown.

District	Winners			Runners-up						Total
District	Candidate	Vote	%	Candidate	Vote	%	Candidate	Vote	%	Total	Maj.	%
SD 1	Dana Mann-Tavegla	678	100.00	—	—	—	—	—	—	678	678	100.00
SD 7	Kathryn Sessions	1,157	100.00	—	—	—	—	—	—	1,157	1,157	100.00
SD 9	Mike Massie	1,080	100.00	—	—	—	—	—	—	1,080	1,080	100.00
SD 11	Bill Vasey	1,526	100.00	—	—	—	—	—	—	1,526	1,526	100.00
SD 13	Tex Boggs	1,065	43.10	Marv Tyler	945	38.24	John Hastert	461	18.66	2,471	120	4.86
SD 15	Ken Decaria	1,192	99.58	Write-ins	5	0.42	—	—	—	1,197	1,187	99.16
