= Senator Boggs (disambiguation) =

J. Caleb Boggs (1909–1993) was a U.S. Senator from Delaware from 1961 to 1973. Senator Boggs may also refer to:

- Larry Boggs (born 1946), Oklahoma State Senate
- Lilburn Boggs (1796–1860), Missouri State Senate
- Tex Boggs (born 1938), Wyoming State Senate
- William Benton Boggs (1854–1922), Louisiana State Senate
