= Melissa Butcher =

American politician

Member-elect of the Wyoming Senate from the 21st district
- Assuming office January 2027
- Succeeding: Bo Biteman

Personal details
- Party: Republican

Melissa Butcher is an American politician. A member of the Republican Party, she is the member-elect for the 21st district of the Wyoming Senate.
