= Wyoming's 19th State Senate district =

American legislative district

- Wyoming's 19th State Senate district as of 2022
Senator
Dan Laursen; R–Powell
- Demographics: 85% White; 10% Hispanic; 1% Asian; 1% Other; 3% Multiracial
- Population (2022): 18,095

Wyoming's 19th State Senate district is one of 31 districts in the Wyoming Senate. The district encompasses parts of Big Horn and Park counties. It is represented by Republican Senator Dan Laursen of Powell.

In 1992, the state of Wyoming switched from electing state legislators by county to a district-based system.

== List of members representing the district ==
Representative	Party	Term	Note
Carroll S. Miller	Republican	1993 – 2003	Elected in 1992. Re-elected in 1994. Re-elected in 1998.
Laness Northrup	Republican	2003 – 2005	Elected in 2002. Died in 2005.
R. Ray Peterson	Republican	2005 – 2019	Appointed in 2005. Elected in 2006. Re-elected in 2010. Re-elected in 2014.
R. J. Kost	Republican	2019 – 2023	Elected in 2018.
Dan Laursen	Republican	2023-present	Elected in 2022.

== Recent election results ==
=== 2006 ===
Senate district 19 general election
Party	Candidate	Votes	%
Republican	R. Ray Peterson (incumbent)	5,985	100.0%
Total votes		5,985	100.0%
Republican hold			

=== 2010 ===
Senate district 19 general election
Party	Candidate	Votes	%
Republican	R. Ray Peterson (incumbent)	5,678	99.12%
Write-ins		50	0.87%
Total votes		5,728	100.0%
Invalid or blank votes		865	
Republican hold			

=== 2014 ===
Senate district 19 general election
Party	Candidate	Votes	%
Republican	R. Ray Peterson (incumbent)	4,847	98.83%
Write-ins		57	1.16%
Total votes		4,904	100.0%
Invalid or blank votes		941	
Republican hold			

=== 2018 ===
Senate district 19 general election
Party	Candidate	Votes	%
Republican	R. J. Kost	5,569	97.37%
Write-ins		150	2.62%
Total votes		5,719	100.0%
Invalid or blank votes		741	
Republican hold			

=== 2022 ===
Senate district 19 general election
Party	Candidate	Votes	%
Republican	Dan Laursen	5,538	93.84%
Write-ins		363	6.15%
Total votes		5,901	100.0%
Invalid or blank votes		859	
Republican hold			

== Historical district boundaries ==
Map	Description	Apportionment Plan	Notes
	Big Horn County (part); Park County (part)	1992 Apportionment Plan	
	Big Horn County (part); Park County (part)	2002 Apportionment Plan	
	Big Horn County (part); Park County (part)	2012 Apportionment Plan	
