= Robert Wharff =

Wyoming politician

Member of the Wyoming House of Representatives from the 49th district
- Incumbent
- Assumed office January 2025
- Preceded by: Ryan Berger
- Succeeded by: David Walton (elect)
- In office January 4, 2021 – January 2023
- Preceded by: Garry Piiparinen
- Succeeded by: Ryan Berger

Personal details
- Born: Salt Lake City, Utah, U.S.
- Education: Utah State University (BS)

Robert Wharff is an American politician serving as a member of the Wyoming House of Representatives from the 49th district. Elected in November 2024, he assumed office in January 2025.

== Background ==
Wharff was born and raised in Salt Lake City. He earned a Bachelor of Science degree in wildlife management from Utah State University. Since 2002, Wharff has worked as the executive director of Wyoming Sportsmen for Fish & Wildlife. Wharff was elected to the Wyoming House of Representatives in November 2020 and assumed office on January 4, 2021.

Instead of seeking re-election to the state house, in 2022, Wharff ran in the Republican primary for the Wyoming Senate seat representing the 15th district. He was defeated in the primary.

In 2024, Wharff was once again elected to the state house.
