= Wyoming's 11th State Senate district =

American legislative district

- Wyoming's 11th State Senate district as of 2022
Senator
Larry S. Hicks; R–Baggs
- Demographics: 77% White; 1% Black; 18% Hispanic; 1% Native American; 2% Multiracial
- Population (2022): 18,301

Wyoming's 11th State Senate district is one of 31 districts in the Wyoming Senate. The district encompasses Carbon County as well as part of Sweetwater County. It is represented by Republican Senator Larry S. Hicks of Baggs.

In 1992, the state of Wyoming switched from electing state legislators by county to a district-based system.

== List of members representing the district ==
Representative	Party	Term	Note
Bob Grieve	Republican	1993 – 1999	Elected in 1992. Re-elected in 1994.
Bill Vasey	Democratic	1999 – 2009	Elected in 1998. Re-elected in 2002. Re-elected in 2006. Resigned in 2009.
James Elliott	Democratic	2009 – 2011	Appointed in 2009.
Larry S. Hicks	Republican	2011 – present	Elected in 2010. Re-elected in 2014. Re-elected in 2018. Re-elected in 2022.

== Recent election results ==
=== 2006 ===
Senate district 11 general election
Party	Candidate	Votes	%
Democratic	Bill Vasey (incumbent)	3,394	59.26%
Republican	Harry Lovato	1,789	31.23%
Independents	Kenneth R. Casner	544	9.49%
Total votes		5,727	100.0%
Democratic hold			

=== 2010 ===
Senate district 11 general election
Party	Candidate	Votes	%
Republican	Larry S. Hicks	2,903	55.35%
Democratic	Jim Elliott (incumbent)	1,798	34.28%
Independents	Ken Casner	534	10.18%
Write-ins		9	0.17%
Total votes		5,244	100.0%
Invalid or blank votes		122	
Republican gain from Democratic			

=== 2014 ===
Senate district 11 general election
Party	Candidate	Votes	%
Republican	Larry S. Hicks (incumbent)	3,167	62.72%
Democratic	Linda Fleming	1,873	37.09%
Write-ins		9	0.17%
Total votes		5,049	100.0%
Invalid or blank votes		222	
Republican hold			

=== 2018 ===
Senate district 11 general election
Party	Candidate	Votes	%
Republican	Larry S. Hicks (incumbent)	3,757	65.83%
Democratic	Lee Ann Stephenson	1,939	33.97%
Write-ins		11	0.19%
Total votes		5,707	100.0%
Invalid or blank votes		239	
Republican hold			

=== 2022 ===
Senate district 11 general election
Party	Candidate	Votes	%
Republican	Larry S. Hicks (incumbent)	4,153	78.35%
Constitution	Michael Ray Williams	1,104	20.83%
Write-ins		43	0.81%
Total votes		5,300	100.0%
Invalid or blank votes		386	
Republican hold			

== Historical district boundaries ==
Map	Description	Apportionment Plan	Notes
	Albany County (part); Carbon County (part)	1992 Apportionment Plan	
	Carbon County; Albany County (part)	2002 Apportionment Plan	
	Carbon County; Albany County (part); Sweetwater County (part)	2012 Apportionment Plan	
