= Wyoming's 17th State Senate district =

American legislative district

- Wyoming's 17th State Senate district as of 2022
Senator
| Mike Gierau; D–Jackson |
- Demographics: 80% White; 1% Black; 15% Hispanic; 1% Asian; 1% Other; 3% Multiracial
- Population (2022): 19,737

Wyoming's 17th State Senate district is one of 31 districts in the Wyoming Senate. The district encompasses part of Teton County. It is represented by Democratic Senator Mike Gierau of Jackson.

In 1992, the state of Wyoming switched from electing state legislators by county to a district-based system.

== List of members representing the district ==
| Representative | Party | Term | Note |
|---|---|---|---|
| Bob LaLonde | Republican | 1993 – 1995 | Elected in 1992. |
| Grant Larson | Republican | 1995 – 2011 | Elected in 1994. Re-elected in 1998. Re-elected in 2002. Re-elected in 2006. |
| Leland Christensen | Republican | 2011 – 2019 | Elected in 2010. Re-elected in 2014. |
| Mike Gierau | Democratic | 2019 – present | Elected in 2018. Re-elected in 2022. |

== Recent election results ==
=== 2006 ===
Senate district 17 general election
| Party | Candidate | Votes | % |
|---|---|---|---|
| Republican | Grant Larson (incumbent) | 4,349 | 52.52% |
| Democratic | Chuck Herz | 3,931 | 47.47% |
| Total votes | | 8,280 | 100.0% |
| Republican hold | | | |

=== 2010 ===
Senate district 17 general election
| Party | Candidate | Votes | % |
|---|---|---|---|
| Republican | Leland Christensen | 4,361 | 55.10% |
| Democratic | Tom Frisbie | 3,547 | 44.81% |
| Write-ins | | 6 | 0.07% |
| Total votes | | 7,914 | 100.0% |
| Invalid or blank votes | | 203 | |
| Republican hold | | | |

=== 2014 ===
Senate district 17 general election
| Party | Candidate | Votes | % |
|---|---|---|---|
| Republican | Leland Christensen (incumbent) | 4,926 | 98.24% |
| Write-ins | | 88 | 1.75% |
| Total votes | | 5,014 | 100.0% |
| Invalid or blank votes | | 1708 | |
| Republican hold | | | |

=== 2018 ===
Senate district 17 general election
| Party | Candidate | Votes | % |
|---|---|---|---|
| Democratic | Mike Gierau | 6,008 | 62.27% |
| Republican | Kate Mead | 3,631 | 37.63% |
| Write-ins | | 9 | 0.09% |
| Total votes | | 9,648 | 100.0% |
| Invalid or blank votes | | 205 | |
| Democratic gain from Republican | | | |

=== 2022 ===
Senate district 17 general election
| Party | Candidate | Votes | % |
|---|---|---|---|
| Democratic | Mike Gierau (incumbent) | 5,142 | 62.79% |
| Republican | Steve Duerr | 2,615 | 31.93% |
| Libertarian | Amanda Padilla | 421 | 5.14% |
| Write-ins | | 10 | 0.12% |
| Total votes | | 8,188 | 100.0% |
| Invalid or blank votes | | 180 | |
| Democratic hold | | | |

== Historical district boundaries ==
| Map | Description | Apportionment Plan | Notes |
|---|---|---|---|
| | Teton County; Fremont County (part); Sublette County (part) | 1992 Apportionment Plan | |
| | Fremont County (part); Teton County (part) | 2002 Apportionment Plan | |
| | Teton County (part) | 2012 Apportionment Plan | |
