= Senator Barnard =

Senator Barnard may refer to:

- George Henry Barnard (1868–1954), Senate of Canada from 1945 to 1954
- Isaac D. Barnard (1791–1834), U.S. Senator for Pennsylvania from 1827 to 1831
- Paul Barnard (politician), Wyoming State Senate
