= David Bonner =

David or Dave Bonner may refer to:

- David M. Bonner (1916–1964), American biochemical geneticist
- David Bonner, British television writer and creator of The Lampies
- Dave Bonner (politician) (born 1940), member of the Wyoming House of Representatives
