= Wyoming's 1st State Senate district =

American legislative district

- Wyoming's 1st State Senate district as of 2022
Senator
Ogden Driskill; R–Devils Tower
- Demographics: 88% White; 8% Hispanic; 1% Native American; 3% Multiracial
- Population (2022) • Voting age: 20,292; 18

Wyoming's 1st State Senate district is one of 31 districts in the Wyoming Senate. The district encompasses Crook County, as well as parts of Campbell and Weston counties. It has been represented by Republican Senator Ogden Driskill since 2011.

In 1992, the state of Wyoming switched from electing state legislators by county to a district-based system.

== List of members representing the district ==
Representative	Party	Term	Note
Jerry B. Dixon	Republican	1993 – 1995	Elected in 1992.
Billie L. Barton	Republican	1995 – 2003	Elected in 1994. Re-elected in 1998. Re-elected in 2002. Resigned in 2003.
Charles Townsend	Republican	2003 – 2011	Appointed in 2003. Elected in 2004. Re-elected in 2006.
Ogden Driskill	Republican	2011 – Present	Elected in 2010. Re-elected in 2014. Re-elected in 2018. Re-elected in 2022.

== Recent election results ==
=== Federal and statewide results ===
Office	Year	District	Statewide
President	2016	Trump 89.3% – Clinton 6.7%	Donald; Trump
President	2012	Romney 86.2% – Obama 10.9%	Mitt; Romney
Senate	2012	Barrasso 87.3% – Chesnut 9.1%	John; Barrasso
Representative	2012	Lummis 82.8% – Henrichsen 9.9%	Cynthia; Lummis

=== 2006 ===
Senate District 1 general election
Party	Candidate	Votes	%
Republican	Charles Townsend (incumbent)	6,266	100.0%
Total votes		6,266	100.0%
Republican hold			

=== 2010 ===
Senate District 1 general election
Party	Candidate	Votes	%
Republican	Ogden Driskill	6,225	100.0%
Total votes		6,225	100.0%
Republican hold			

=== 2014 ===
Senate District 1 general election
Party	Candidate	Votes	%
Republican	Ogden Driskill (incumbent)	4,611	100.0%
Total votes		4,611	100.0%
Republican hold			

=== 2018 ===
Republican incumbent Ogden Driskill was re-elected with no challenger.

Senate District 1 general election
Party	Candidate	Votes	%
Republican	Ogden Driskill (incumbent)	5,557	96.74%
Write-In	Write-ins	187	3.26%
Total votes		5,744	100.0%
Invalid or blank votes		1,115	N/A
Republican hold			

== Historical district boundaries ==
Map	Description	Apportionment plan	Notes
	Crook County; Niobrara County; Weston County; Converse County (part); Goshen County (part)	1992 Apportionment Plan	
	Crook County; Niobrara County; Weston County; Converse County (part); Goshen County (part)	2002 Apportionment Plan	
	Crook County; Campbell County (part); Weston County (part)	2012 Apportionment Plan	
