= Virginia L. Wright =

Wyoming politician

Member of the Wyoming House of Representatives
- In office 1989–1994
- Succeeded by: Bruce Burns
- Constituency: Sheridan County (1989-1993); 51st district (1993-1994)

Personal details
- Party: Republican

Virginia L. Wright is an American Republican politician from Sheridan, Wyoming. She represented the Sheridan County in the Wyoming House of Representatives from 1989 to 1993. When Wyoming changed the state legislature from a county-based to system to a district-based system in 1992, she was elected to represent the 51st district. Wright announced she would not run for re-election in December 1993.
