= Norine Kasperik =

American politician

Member of the Wyoming House of Representatives from the 32nd district
- In office January 11, 2011 – January 10, 2017
- Preceded by: Timothy Hallinan
- Succeeded by: Timothy Hallinan

Personal details
- Party: Republican
- Education: UPMC Shadyside School of Nursing; Regis University; University of Mary

Norine A. Kasperik is an American politician and a former Republican member of the Wyoming House of Representatives representing District 32.

== Education ==
Kasperik earned her diploma from the UPMC Shadyside School of Nursing, her BSN from Regis University, and her MS in nursing administration from the University of Mary.

== Elections ==
- 2012 Kasperik was unopposed for both the August 21, 2012 Republican Primary, winning with 1,175 votes, and the November 6, 2012 General election, winning with 3,741 votes.
- 2010 When Republican Representative Timothy Hallinan retired and left the District 32 seat open, Kasperik won the August 17, 2010 Republican Primary with 1,232 votes (58.5%), and won the November 2, 2010 General election with 2,391 votes (83.2%) against Democratic nominee Duffy Jenniges, a perennial candidate who sought the seat in 1998, 2000, 2002, 2004, 2006, and 2008.
