= Wyoming's 13th State Senate district =

American legislative district

- Wyoming's 13th State Senate district as of 2022
Senator
Stacy Jones; R–Rock Springs
- Demographics: 76% White; 1% Black; 19% Hispanic; 1% Asian; 2% Native American; 2% Multiracial
- Population (2022): 17,444

Wyoming's 13th State Senate district is one of 31 districts in the Wyoming Senate. The district encompasses part of Sweetwater County. It is represented by Republican Senator Stacy Jones of Rock Springs.

In 1992, the state of Wyoming switched from electing state legislators by county to a district-based system.

== List of members representing the district ==
Representative	Party	Term	Note
Charley Maldonado	Democratic	1993 – 1995	Elected in 1992.
Ray Sarcletti	Republican	1995 – 1999	Elected in 1994.
Tex Boggs	Democratic	1999 – 2007	Elected in 1998. Re-elected in 2002.
John Hastert	Democratic	2007 – 2019	Elected in 2006. Re-elected in 2010. Re-elected in 2014.
Tom James	Republican	2019 – 2023	Elected in 2018.
Stacy Jones	Republican	2023 – present	Elected in 2022.

== Recent election results ==
=== 2006 ===
Senate district 13 general election
Party	Candidate	Votes	%
Democratic	John Hastert	4,616	100.0%
Total votes		4,616	100.0%
Democratic hold			

=== 2010 ===
Senate district 13 general election
Party	Candidate	Votes	%
Democratic	John Hastert (incumbent)	3,919	96.47%
Write-ins		143	3.52%
Total votes		4,062	100.0%
Invalid or blank votes		1,539	
Democratic hold			

=== 2014 ===
Senate district 13 general election
Party	Candidate	Votes	%
Democratic	John Hastert (incumbent)	3,626	95.90%
Write-ins		155	4.09%
Total votes		3,781	100.0%
Invalid or blank votes		1,396	
Democratic hold			

=== 2018 ===
Senate district 13 general election
Party	Candidate	Votes	%
Republican	Tom James	2,625	46.64%
Democratic	John Hastert (incumbent)	2,108	37.45%
Independents	Ted L. Barney	889	15.79%
Write-ins		6	0.10%
Total votes		5,628	100.0%
Invalid or blank votes		261	
Republican gain from Democratic			

=== 2022 ===
Senate district 13 general election
Party	Candidate	Votes	%
Republican	Stacy Jones	3,859	75.75%
Democratic	Leesa Kuhlmann	1,220	23.94%
Write-ins		15	0.29%
Total votes		5,094	100.0%
Invalid or blank votes		158	
Republican hold			

== Historical district boundaries ==
Map	Description	Apportionment Plan	Notes
	Sweetwater County (part)	1992 Apportionment Plan	
	Sweetwater County (part)	2002 Apportionment Plan	
	Sweetwater County (part)	2012 Apportionment Plan	
