= R. J. Kost =

American politician

Reynolds J. Kost

Member of the Wyoming Senate from the 19th district
- In office January 7, 2019 – 2023
- Preceded by: R. Ray Peterson
- Succeeded by: Dan Laursen

Personal details
- Born: Greybull, Wyoming
- Party: Republican
- Spouse: Caroline S. Kost
- Children: 2
- Education: Rocky Mountain College; University of Wyoming

R.J. Kost is an American politician who served in the Wyoming Senate representing the 19th district as a member of the Republican Party from 2019 to 2023.

== Career ==
In 2018, Kost defeated incumbent Senator R. Ray Peterson with 53.80% of the vote. He served on the Agriculture, State and Public Lands & Water Resources, Judiciary, School Facilities, and Interstate Compact for Adult Offender Supervision committees.

== Electoral history ==
=== 2018 ===
Senate District 19 Republican primary
Party	Candidate	Votes	%
Republican	R. J. Kost	2,246	53.80%
Republican	R. Ray Peterson (incumbent)	1,921	46.01%
Republican	Write-ins	8	0.19%
Majority		325	7.79%
Total votes		4,175	100.00%

Senate District 19 general election
Party	Candidate	Votes	%
Republican	R. J. Kost	5,569	97.38%
Write-In	Write-ins	150	2.62%
Total votes		5,719	100.00%
Invalid or blank votes		741	N/A
Republican hold			
