= R. Ray Peterson =

American politician

Member of the Wyoming Senate from the 19th district
- In office May 2005 – January 7, 2019
- Preceded by: Laness Northrup
- Succeeded by: R.J. Kost

Personal details
- Born: May 3, 1959 (age 67) Lovell, Wyoming, U.S.
- Party: Republican
- Spouse: Cresta
- Children: 3

R. Ray Peterson (born May 3, 1959) is a former Republican member of the Wyoming Senate, representing the 19th district from 2005 to 2019. The 19th district includes Big Horn County and eastern Park County. He was first appointed in May 2005, following the death of Laness Northrup.
