= Motor Square Garden =

- East Liberty Market
- U.S. National Register of Historic Places
- Pittsburgh Landmark – PHLF
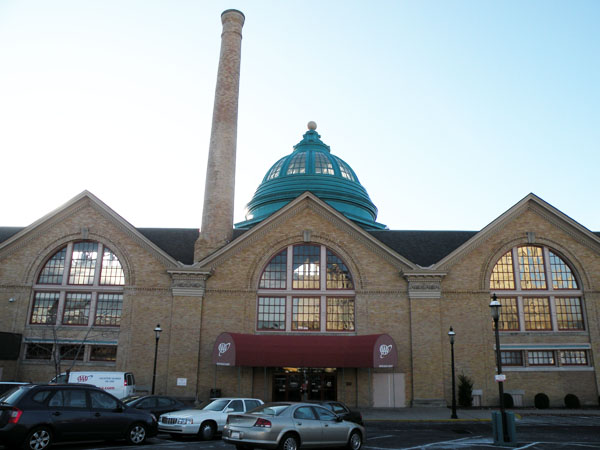

- Location within Pittsburgh Location within Pennsylvania Location within the United States
- Location: 5900 Baum Boulevard, East Liberty, Pittsburgh, Pennsylvania
- Coordinates: 40°27′35.2″N 79°55′38.14″W
- Built: 1898-1900
- Architect: Peabody & Stearns
- Architectural style: Beaux-Arts
- NRHP reference No.: 77001121

Significant dates
- Added to NRHP: December 12, 1977
- Designated PHLF: 1975 and 1988

Motor Square Garden, also known as East Liberty Market, is a building in Pittsburgh, Pennsylvania, United States, that is listed on the National Register of Historic Places.

Located at 5900 Baum Boulevard in the East Liberty neighborhood, it today serves as the headquarters of the Pittsburgh branch of the American Automobile Association, which owns the property. The exterior of the building features a large tin-clad, steel-framed blue dome and a yellow brick facade. The industrial interior has a large atrium with exposed steel girders and skylights above.

== History ==
Financed by the Mellon family of Pittsburgh, the building was built from 1898 to 1900 as a city market—after one of their real estate subdivisions failed to sell enough houses—calling it East Liberty Market House. The Boston, Massachusetts architectural firm of Peabody and Stearns designed the building. Motor Square Garden soon failed as a retail space, but in 1915 the new Pittsburgh Automobile Association bought it as a site for its auto shows. In the 1920s, it came into use as a sports venue, especially for boxing, and was used intermittently as the home court of the University of Pittsburgh's basketball team until the opening of Pitt Pavilion inside Pitt Stadium in 1925.

During the early 1930s, Motor Square Garden gained regional attention as the site of several Great Depression-era dance marathons. These grueling endurance contests drew dozens of couples and large audiences to the venue in East Liberty. One of the most notable events took place in 1932–1933, when over 130 contestants participated in a marathon that lasted 838 continuous hours (approximately 35 days). The winners, Florence “Flo” Franchina and Eddie Bonach, took home a $1,000 prize after weeks of nearly nonstop movement, brief rest breaks, and public spectacle. The contest drew nightly crowds and became a notable Depression-era entertainment event in Pittsburgh. These marathons, common across the U.S. during the era, provided food, shelter, and the hope of financial relief for struggling participants.

By the 1940s it was used as a new car dealership.

In 1988, AAA bought the property. Landmarks Design Associates of Pittsburgh redesigned it as an upscale shopping mall. The retail mall failed, but AAA expanded to occupy the building, along with a tenant, the UPMC Shadyside School of Nursing.

== Gallery ==
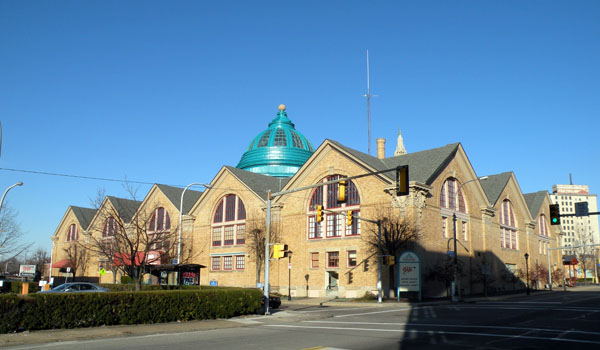
East Liberty Market

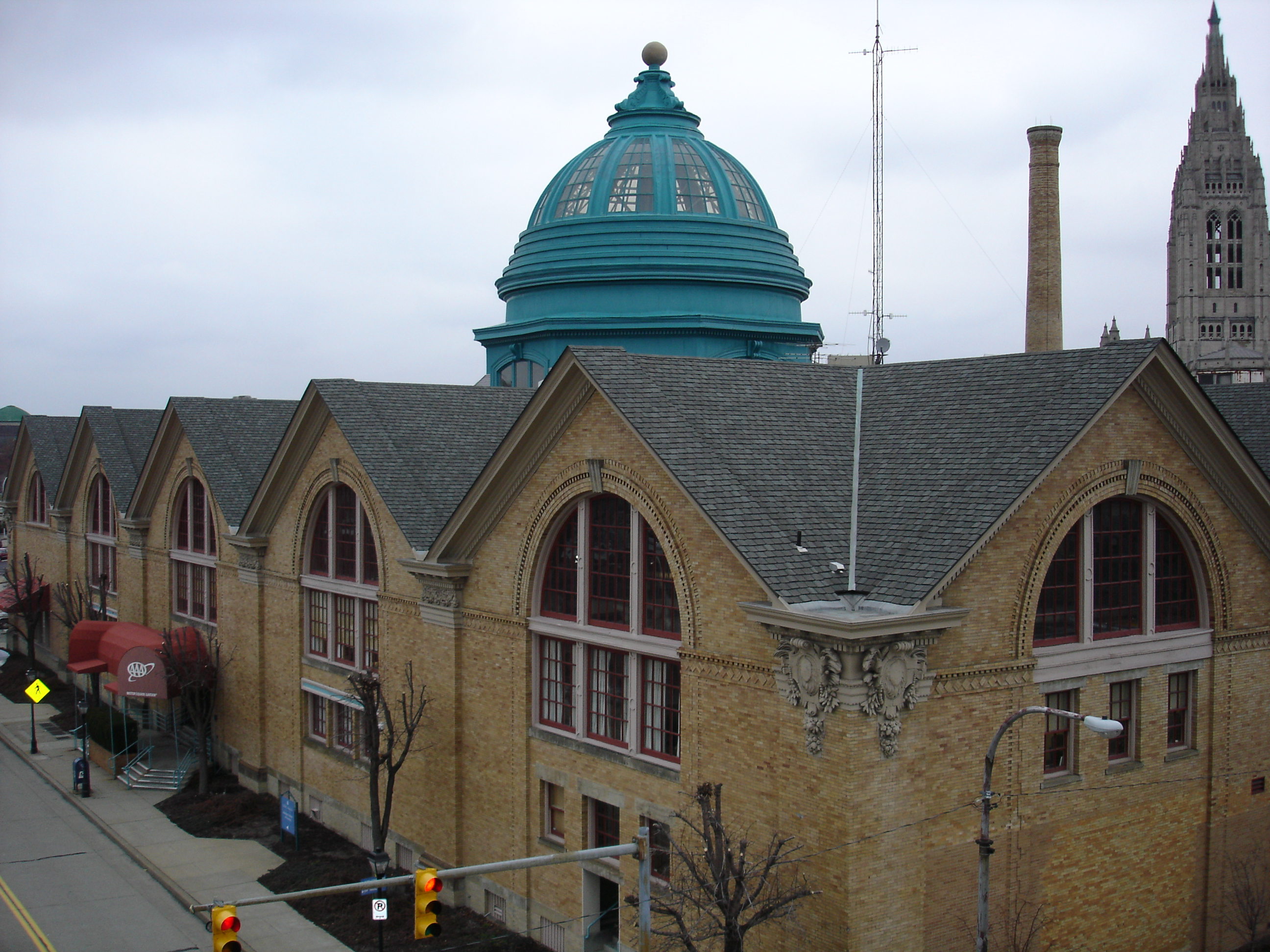
Motor Square Garden

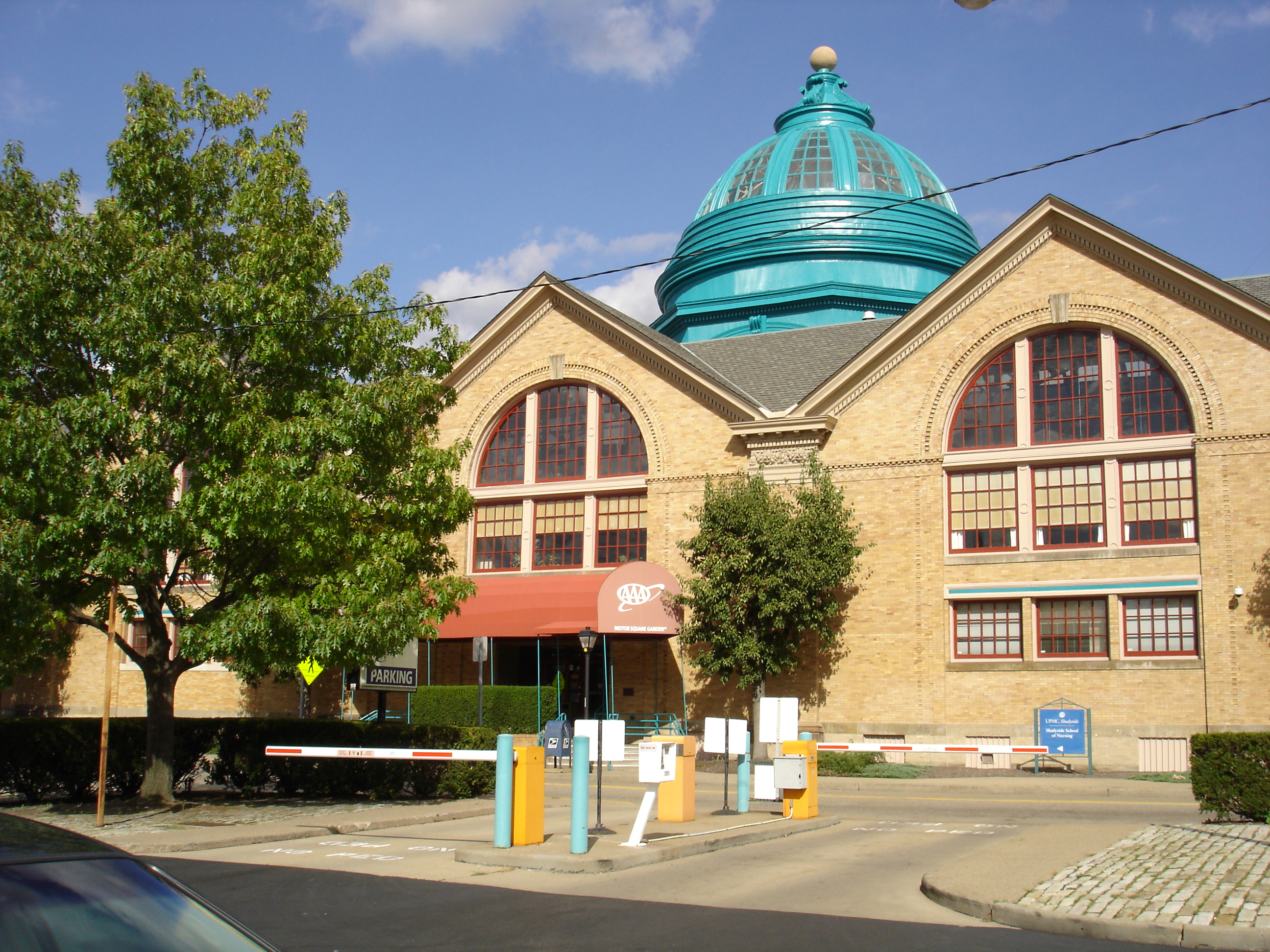
Motor Square Garden is currently the home of AAA East Central and the UPMC Shadyside School of Nursing.

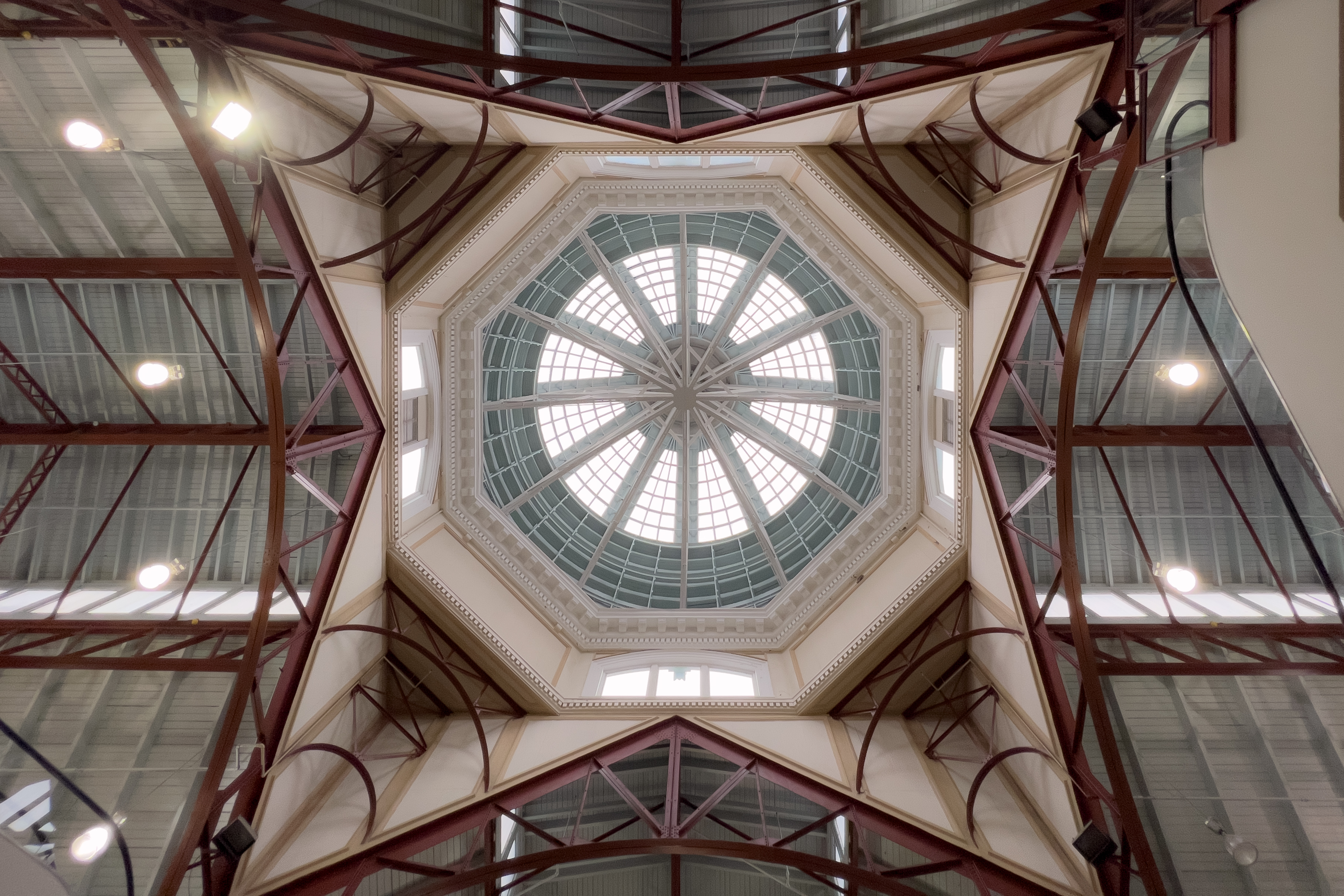
Interior Atrium and Skylights
