= Leland Christensen =

American politician (1959–2022)

Member of the Wyoming Senate from the 17th district
- In office January 11, 2011 – January 7, 2019
- Preceded by: Grant Larson
- Succeeded by: Mike Gierau

Personal details
- Born: April 30, 1959 Alta, Wyoming, U.S.
- Died: February 4, 2022 (aged 62) Idaho Falls, Idaho, U.S.
- Party: Republican
- Spouse: Anita Christensen
- Children: 5
- Profession: Politician, auctioneer

Leland G. Christensen (April 30, 1959 – February 4, 2022) was an American politician who was a Republican member of the Wyoming Senate, representing the 17th district from 2011 until 2019.

== Life and career ==
Christensen was born in Alta, Wyoming, and lived in Jackson, Wyoming. He worked as a law enforcement officer and an auctioneer. He served for fifteen years in the Wyoming National Guard and with the 19th Special Forces Group in the U.S. Army.

He died from complications of COVID-19 in Idaho Falls on February 4, 2022, at the age of 62, amidst the COVID-19 pandemic in Idaho. At the time of his death, Christensen was receiving chemotherapy for non-Hodgkin lymphoma.

== Electoral history ==
=== 2010 ===
After incumbent Republican Senator Grant Larson announced his retirement, Christensen - then a Teton County Commissioner - announced his candidacy. He defeated Sam Harrell in the Republican primary and defeated Democratic candidate Tom Frisbie in the general election, 52% to 48%.

=== 2014 ===
Christensen was re-elected to the State Senate unopposed in both the primary and general elections.

=== 2016 ===
Christensen ran for the U.S. House seat held by Cynthia Lummis after Lummis announced her retirement, but lost in the primary to Liz Cheney on August 16, 2016.

He ran for state treasurer but lost in the primary to Curt Meier, and did not seek reelection in the State Senate.
