= Bo Biteman =

American politician (born 1978)

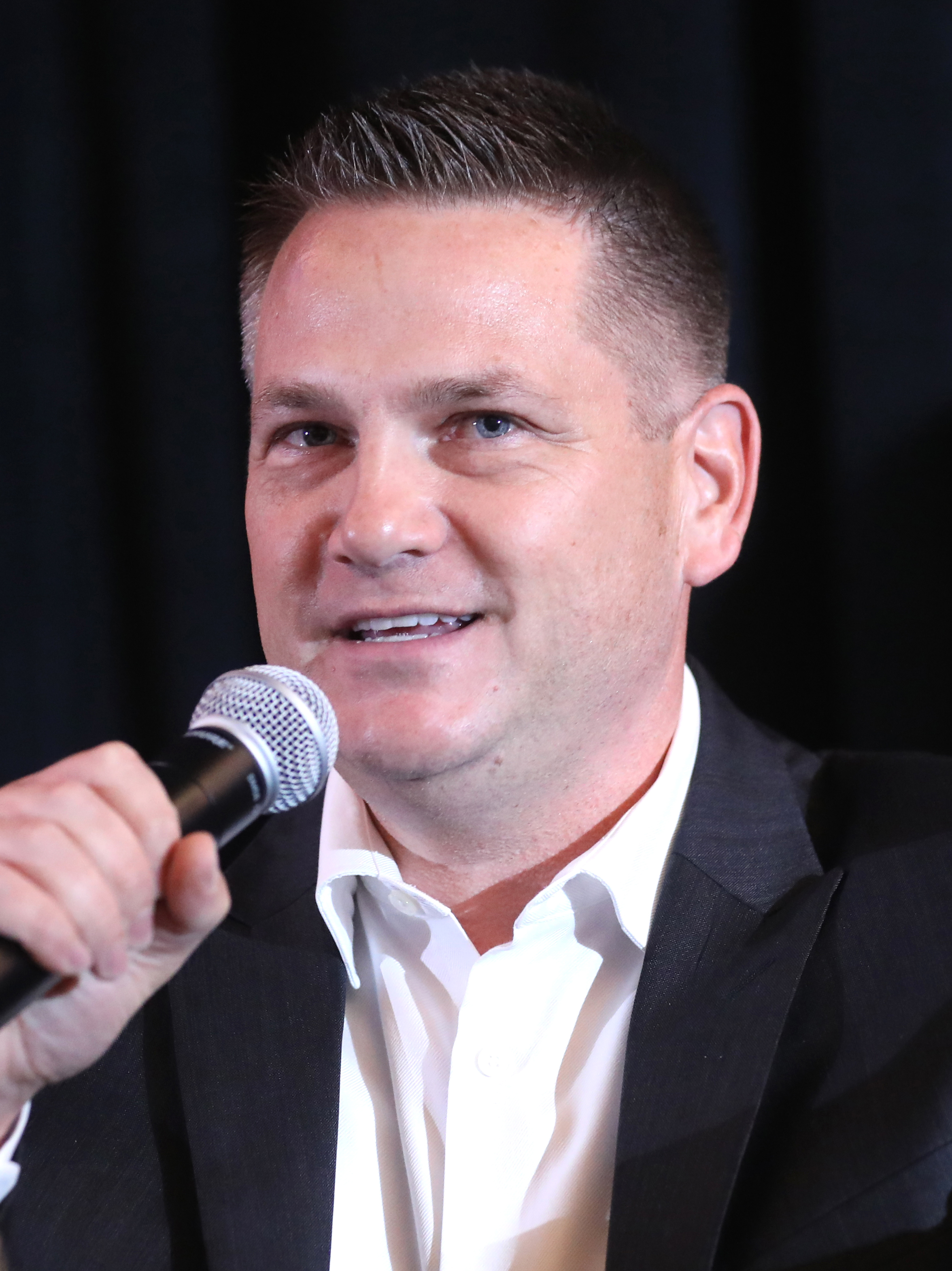

President of the Wyoming Senate
- Incumbent
- Assumed office January 14, 2025
- Preceded by: Ogden Driskill

Member of the Wyoming Senate from the 21st district
- Incumbent
- Assumed office January 7, 2019
- Preceded by: Bruce Burns
- Succeeded by: Melissa Butcher (elect)

Member of the Wyoming House of Representatives from the 51st district
- In office January 10, 2017 – January 7, 2019
- Preceded by: Rosie Berger
- Succeeded by: Cyrus Western

Personal details
- Born: Dennis Dean Biteman; October 23, 1978 (age 48) Midland, Michigan, U.S.
- Party: Republican
- Spouse: Mercedes
- Children: 2
- Education: Central Michigan University (attended); West Shore Community College (attended); Grand Valley State University (BBA)

Dennis Dean "Bo" Biteman (born October 23, 1978) is an American politician who serves as President of the Wyoming State Senate and as a Republican member of the Wyoming Senate, representing District 21 since January 7, 2019. He previously served in the Wyoming House of Representatives, representing District 51 from 2017 to 2019, and is a candidate for the United States House of Representatives.

== Life and education ==
Bo Biteman attended Central Michigan University and West Shore Community College before earning a Bachelor of Business Administration from Grand Valley State University, after college he began working in the energy sector as a landman in Wyoming.

Biteman lives just outside Sheridan in Parkman. He is married to his wife, Mercedes, and they have two children.

== Political career ==
=== Elections ===
Biteman challenged incumbent state Senate Majority Leader Rosie Berger in the Republican primary and defeated Berger with 56% of the vote. Biteman defeated Democrat Hollis Hackman in the general election with 69% of the vote.

=== Political positions ===
Biteman has been described as a pro-energy and pro-agriculture legislator, with a focus on economic issues and job creation in Wyoming. He has emphasized a results-driven conservative record during his tenure in the state legislature.

Biteman has supported tax policy changes described by supporters as among the largest tax cuts in Wyoming history.

He was a leading supporter and Senate sponsor of school choice legislation, including the Wyoming Freedom Scholarship Act, which expanded education savings accounts statewide. The legislation drew national attention and praise from President Donald Trump in his role in advancing the legislation, calling Biteman a “patriot” and stating that the effort would be an “incredible victory for Wyoming students and families.”

Biteman has sponsored and supported multiple pieces of legislation aimed at expanding Wyoming’s energy sector. In 2026, he co-sponsored legislation establishing the Wyoming Energy Dominance Fund, a program designed to support fossil fuel and mineral development projects through grants and loans.

On social issues, Biteman opposes abortion and has supported pro-life legislation. In 2020, he introduced a fetal heartbeat bill that would restrict abortion access in Wyoming.

Biteman has received a 100% rating from the American Conservative Union’s CPAC scorecard and a 100% rating from the Club for Growth, reflecting his conservative legislative record.

=== Political future ===
In 2023, then former President Donald Trump publicly encouraged Biteman to run for higher office, specifically Governor, stating on a radio interview "Bo is a good man… I would like to see him run… I would have endorsed him".

In 2026, Biteman announced his candidacy for Wyoming's at-large district in the U.S. House of Representatives, which is being vacated by Representative Harriet Hageman as she runs for the U.S. Senate.

Wyoming Senate
Preceded by Ogden Driskill	President of the Wyoming Senate; 2025–present	Incumbent
