= David Blevins =

American politician

Member of the Wyoming House of Representatives from the 25th district
- In office January 8, 2013 – January 5, 2015
- Preceded by: Dave Bonner
- Succeeded by: Dan Laursen

Personal details
- Born: July 23, 1949 (age 77) Powell, Wyoming, U.S.
- Party: Republican
- Education: University of Wyoming (BS)

Military service
- Allegiance: United States
- Branch/service: United States Navy
- Rank: Captain

David H. Blevins (born July 23, 1949, in Powell, Wyoming) is an American politician and a Republican member of the Wyoming House of Representatives representing District 25 since January 8, 2013.

== Education ==
Blevins earned his BS from the University of Wyoming.

== Elections ==
- 2012 When Republican Representative Dave Bonner retired and left the District 25 seat open, Blevins won the four-way August 21, 2012 Republican Primary with 765 votes (44.3%), and was unopposed for the November 6, 2012 General election, winning with 3,456 votes.
