= Jeff Wasserburger =

American politician

Member of the Wyoming Senate from the 23rd district
- In office January 5, 2015 – January 10, 2023
- Preceded by: John Hines
- Succeeded by: Eric Barlow

Member of the Wyoming House of Representatives from the 32nd district
- In office January 1995 – January 2007
- Preceded by: James J. Wyatt
- Succeeded by: Timothy Hallinan

Personal details
- Born: January 8, 1961 (age 65) Lusk, Wyoming
- Party: Republican
- Spouse: Tracy Wasserburger
- Children: 3
- Education: Chadron State College; University of Wyoming
- Profession: Public relations executive

Jeff Wasserburger (born January 8, 1961) is an American politician and a former Republican member of the Wyoming State Senate, representing the 23rd district from 2015 to 2023. Wasserburger previously served in the Wyoming House of Representatives between 1995 and 2007.

== Political career ==
Wasserburger first ran for the Wyoming House of Representatives in 1994. He served six terms before retiring due to self-imposed term limits.

== Elections ==
=== 2014 ===
Incumbent Republican State Senator John Hines retired, leaving the District 23 Senate seat open. Wasserburger defeated John Raney in the Republican primary, and then won the general election unopposed.

== Personal life ==
Simpson is a member of the United Methodist Church.
