= Wyoming's 21st State Senate district =

American legislative district

- Wyoming's 21st State Senate district as of 2022
Senator
Bo Biteman; R–Ranchester
- Demographics: 91% White; 5% Hispanic; 1% Native American; 2% Multiracial
- Population (2022): 19,480

Wyoming's 21st State Senate district is one of 31 districts in the Wyoming Senate. The district encompasses part of Sheridan County. It is represented by Republican Senator Bo Biteman of Ranchester.

In 1992, the state of Wyoming switched from electing state legislators by county to a district-based system.

== List of members representing the district ==
Representative	Party	Term	Note
Tom Kinnison	Republican	1993 – 2003	Elected in 1992. Re-elected in 1994. Re-elected in 1998.
Bruce Burns	Republican	2003 – 2019	Elected in 2002. Re-elected in 2006. Re-elected in 2010. Re-elected in 2014.
Bo Biteman	Republican	2019 – present	Elected in 2018. Re-elected in 2022.

== Recent election results ==
=== 2006 ===
Senate district 21 general election
Party	Candidate	Votes	%
Republican	Bruce Burns (incumbent)	6,300	100.0%
Total votes		6,300	100.0%
Republican hold			

=== 2010 ===
Senate district 21 general election
Party	Candidate	Votes	%
Republican	Bruce Burns (incumbent)	5,825	98.41%
Write-ins		94	1.58%
Total votes		5,919	100.0%
Invalid or blank votes		1,027	
Republican hold			

=== 2014 ===
Senate district 21 general election
Party	Candidate	Votes	%
Republican	Bruce Burns (incumbent)	5,452	97.98%
Write-ins		112	2.01%
Total votes		5,564	100.0%
Invalid or blank votes		1,031	
Republican hold			

=== 2018 ===
Senate district 21 general election
Party	Candidate	Votes	%
Republican	Bo Biteman	5,125	64.45%
Democratic	Hollis Hackman	2,810	35.34%
Write-ins		16	0.20%
Total votes		7,951	100.0%
Invalid or blank votes		219	
Republican hold			

=== 2022 ===
Senate district 21 general election
Party	Candidate	Votes	%
Republican	Bo Biteman (incumbent)	5,815	73.18%
Democratic	Mark Hansen	2,101	26.44%
Write-ins		30	0.37%
Total votes		7,946	100.0%
Invalid or blank votes		232	
Republican hold			

== Historical district boundaries ==
Map	Description	Apportionment Plan	Notes
	Sheridan County (part)	1992 Apportionment Plan	
	Sheridan County (part)	2002 Apportionment Plan	
	Sheridan County (part)	2012 Apportionment Plan	
