= Saundra Meyer =

American politician

Member of the Wyoming Senate from the 15th district
- In office 2009–2011
- Preceded by: Ken Decaria
- Succeeded by: Paul Barnard

Member of the Wyoming House of Representatives from the 49th district
- In office 2007–2009
- Preceded by: Bruce R. Barnard
- Succeeded by: Terry Kimble
- In office 2001–2005
- Preceded by: C. Elaine Phillips
- Succeeded by: Bruce R. Barnard

Personal details
- Born: Lansing, Michigan, U.S.
- Party: Democratic
- Education: University of Wyoming, University of Utah
- Profession: speech pathologist

Saundra Meyer was a Democratic member of the Wyoming House of Representatives, representing the 49th district between 2007 and 2009. She previously served from 2001 through 2004.

Meyer also represented the 15th district in the Wyoming Senate between 2009 and 2011. She was first appointed to state senate in 2009, following Ken Decaria's resignation. She resigned from the House to take her position in the state senate.
