= Jane Warren =

American politician (born 1950)

Member of the Wyoming House of Representatives from the 13th district
- In office 2000–2008
- Preceded by: Jim Rose
- Succeeded by: Cathy Connolly

Personal details
- Born: September 8, 1950 (age 75) Torrington, Wyoming, U.S.
- Party: Democratic
- Children: 2
- Education: University of Wyoming (BA, MA, PhD)
- Profession: Politician, educator

Jane A. Warren (born September 8, 1950) is an American politician and educator who served in the Wyoming House of Representatives from 2000 to 2008, representing the 13th district of as a Democrat.

== Early life and education ==
Warren was born in Torrington, Wyoming, on September 8, 1950. She obtained a Bachelor of Arts, a Master of Arts, and a Doctor of Philosophy from the University of Wyoming in 1974, 1980, and 1987 respectively.

== Career ==
Prior to serving in the Wyoming Legislature, Warren served as a child family therapist from 1985 to 1990. She also worked as a mental health and substance abuse therapist and an adjunct professor for the University of Wyoming.

Warren served as a board member of the Senior Citizen Board in 1998. She served as president of the Community Services Block Grant Board from 2000 to 2003.

Warren served in the Wyoming House of Representatives from 2000 to 2008. (Note: According to the Wyoming Legislature, Warren served from 2001 to 2008.) She represented the 13th district as a Democrat.

During her time in office, Warren served on the following committees:

- Labor, Health and Social Services (2001–2002)
- Appropriations (2003–2008)

Warren also served on the Management Audit Committee from 2001 to 2022. Additionally, she served on the Select Committee on Capital Financing and Investments from 2003 to 2004 and the Select Committee on Mental Health and Substance Abuse from 2005 to 2008.

Since leaving office, Warren has worked as an Assistant Professor in the University of Wyoming's Department of Professional Studies with research interests in addiction and ethics education.

== Political positions ==
Warren received a 100% rating from NARAL Pro-Choice Wyoming in 2003. She received a D rating from the NRA Political Victory Fund in 2006. Warren received a rating of 100 from Wyoming Conservation Voters in 2007.

== Personal life ==
Warren currently resides in Laramie, Wyoming. She has two children.

Warren is a Buddhist.

== Notes ==
Wyoming House of Representatives
Preceded by Jim Rose	Member of the Wyoming House of Representatives from the 13th district 2000–2008	Succeeded by Cathy Connolly
