= Garry Piiparinen =

American politician

Garry C. Piiparinen

Member of the Wyoming House of Representatives from the 49th district
- In office January 8, 2013 – January 4, 2021
- Preceded by: Clarence Vranish
- Succeeded by: Robert Wharff

Personal details
- Party: Republican
- Education: Wayne State University; University of Wyoming; Michigan State University; Brigham Young University (BS); Western New Mexico University (MA)

Garry C. Piiparinen is an American politician and former Wyoming state legislator. A member of the Republican Party, Piiparinen represented the 49th district in the Wyoming House of Representatives from 2013 to 2021.

== Education ==
Piiparinen attended Wayne State University, the University of Wyoming, Michigan State University, and earned his BS in elementary education from Brigham Young University, and his MA in educational administration from Western New Mexico University.

== Elections ==
- 2012 Challenging incumbent Representative Clarence Vranish for the House District 49 seat, Piiparinen won the August 21, 2012 Republican Primary with 704 votes (56.3%) against Vranish, and was unopposed for the November 6, 2012 General election, winning with 2,881 votes.

== Personal life ==
Piiparinen is a member of the Church of Jesus Christ of Latter-day Saints.
