= Wyoming's 15th State Senate district =

American legislative district

- Wyoming's 15th State Senate district as of 2022
Senator
| Wendy Davis Schuler; R–Evanston |
- Demographics: 86% White; 10% Hispanic; 3% Multiracial
- Population (2022): 18,254

Wyoming's 15th State Senate district is one of 31 districts in the Wyoming Senate. The district encompasses part of Uinta County. It is represented by Republican Senator Wendy Davis Schuler of Evanston.

In 1992, the state of Wyoming switched from electing state legislators by county to a district-based system.

== List of members representing the district ==
| Representative | Party | Term | Note |
|---|---|---|---|
| Gregory A. Phillips | Democratic | 1993 – 1999 | Elected in 1992. Re-elected in 1994. |
| Ken Decaria | Democratic | 1999 – 2009 | Elected in 1998. Re-elected in 2002. Re-elected in 2006. Resigned in 2009. |
| Saundra Meyer | Democratic | 2009 – 2011 | Appointed in 2009. |
| Paul Barnard | Republican | 2011 – 2019 | Elected in 2010. Re-elected in 2014. |
| Wendy Davis Schuler | Republican | 2019 – present | Elected in 2018. Re-elected in 2022. |

== Recent election results ==
=== 2006 ===
Senate district 15 general election
| Party | Candidate | Votes | % |
|---|---|---|---|
| Democratic | Ken Decaria (incumbent) | 4,038 | 100.0% |
| Total votes | | 4,038 | 100.0% |
| Democratic hold | | | |

=== 2010 ===
Senate district 15 general election
| Party | Candidate | Votes | % |
|---|---|---|---|
| Republican | Paul Barnard | 2,550 | 55.13% |
| Democratic | Saundra Meyer (incumbent) | 2,061 | 44.56% |
| Write-ins | | 14 | 0.30% |
| Total votes | | 4,625 | 100.0% |
| Invalid or blank votes | | 105 | |
| Republican gain from Democratic | | | |

=== 2014 ===
Senate district 15 general election
| Party | Candidate | Votes | % |
|---|---|---|---|
| Republican | Paul Barnard (incumbent) | 3,329 | 65.69% |
| Democratic | Bret McCoy | 1,702 | 33.58% |
| Write-ins | | 36 | 0.71% |
| Total votes | | 5,067 | 100.0% |
| Invalid or blank votes | | 241 | |
| Republican hold | | | |

=== 2018 ===
Senate district 15 general election
| Party | Candidate | Votes | % |
|---|---|---|---|
| Republican | Wendy Davis Schuler | 4,903 | 97.64% |
| Write-ins | | 118 | 2.35% |
| Total votes | | 5,021 | 100.0% |
| Invalid or blank votes | | 755 | |
| Republican hold | | | |

=== 2022 ===
Senate district 15 general election
| Party | Candidate | Votes | % |
|---|---|---|---|
| Republican | Wendy Davis Schuler (incumbent) | 5,243 | 96.44% |
| Write-ins | | 193 | 3.55% |
| Total votes | | 5,436 | 100.0% |
| Invalid or blank votes | | 771 | |
| Republican hold | | | |

== Historical district boundaries ==
| Map | Description | Apportionment Plan | Notes |
|---|---|---|---|
| | Uinta County (part) | 1992 Apportionment Plan | |
| | Uinta County (part) | 2002 Apportionment Plan | |
| | Uinta County (part) | 2012 Apportionment Plan | |
