= Cyrus Western =

American politician

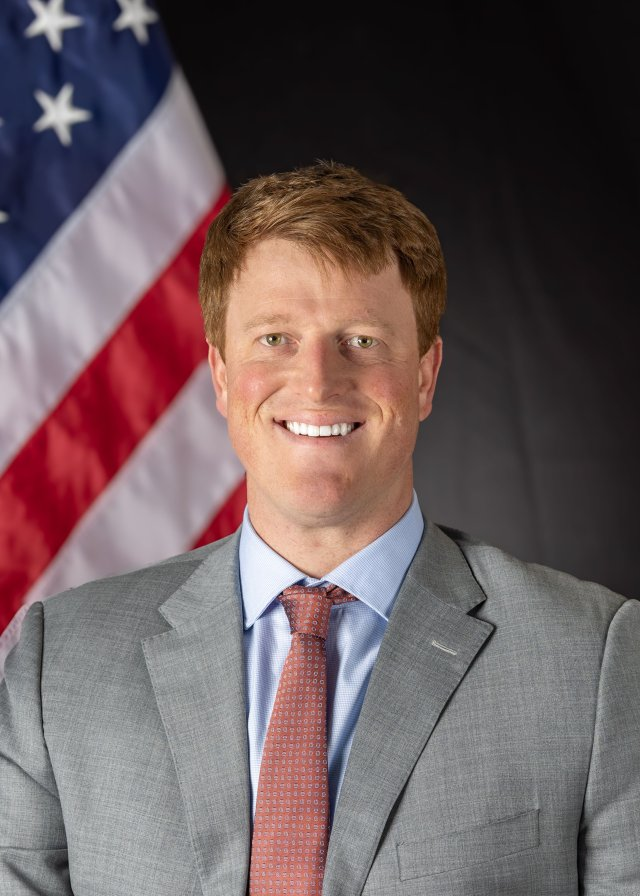
- Official headshot

Member of the Wyoming House of Representatives from the 51st district
- In office January 7, 2019 – January 6, 2025
- Preceded by: Bo Biteman
- Succeeded by: Laurie Bratten

Personal details
- Party: Republican
- Education: Washington and Jefferson College (BS); Harvard University (MA)
- Website: Campaign website

Cyrus Western is an Environmental Protection Agency (EPA) Regional Administrator for the Mountains and Plain regions and a former Wyoming politician.

== Education ==
Western earned a Bachelor's degree in environmental science from Washington & Jefferson College in 2012 and a Master of Arts in Liberal Studies in environmental science from Harvard University in 2016.

== Career ==
=== State House ===
On November 6, 2018, Western was elected to the Wyoming House of Representatives where he represents the 51st district. He ran unopposed in the general election.

On December 14, 2020, on Twitter, Western replied to an article about the appointment of the first African-American sheriff in Wyoming, Aaron Appelhans, with a GIF from the film Blazing Saddles of Cleavon Little's character saying "Where the white women at?" The film scene drew on stereotypes of African-American men. After receiving notable criticism for the tweet, Western deleted the tweet, and called Sheriff Appelhans to apologize. Western also publicly apologized. While Western claimed while he meant to draw on the anti-racist themes of the film in the tweet, he acknowledged that the tweet was insensitive and "dumb." Four months later, in May 2021, the Pikes Peak Southern Christian Leadership Conference called for the resignation of Representative Western over the insensitive tweet, taking into account the apology. Western said that he would not be resigning.

Western sponsors House Bill 84, also known as the Naomi Hunting Age Exemption Act. The bill is named after a Make-A-Wish kid who wanted to go big game hunting, but was ultimately prevented from doing so by Wyoming's big game hunting age requirements. State law requires big game hunters to be at least 12 years old. Western's bill seeks to waive Wyoming Game and Fish Commission age requirements for children with terminal illness. The bill has been introduced to the House Travel, Recreation, Wildlife and Cultural Resources Committee.

Western did not run for re-election in the 2024 state house election.

== Environmental Protection Agency ==
On March 17, 2025, Western was appointed EPA Regional Administrator for the Mountains and Plains region. In this role, he oversees EPA operations in the states of Colorado, Montana, North Dakota, South Dakota, and Wyoming and 28 tribal nations. He said he plans to "balancing environmental protection with affordability and jobs."

== Personal life ==
Western resides in Big Horn, Wyoming. Western is Christian.
