= Wyoming's 32nd House of Representatives district =

American legislative district

Wyoming's 32nd State House of Representatives district
- Wyoming's 32nd House of Representatives district as of 2022
Representative
Ken Clouston; R–Gillette
- Demographics: 89% White; 7% Hispanic; 1% Native American; 2% Multiracial
- Population (2022): 9,446

Wyoming's 32nd House of Representatives district is one of 62 districts in the Wyoming House of Representatives. The district encompasses part of Campbell County. It is represented by Republican Representative Ken Clouston of Gillette.

In 1992, the state of Wyoming switched from electing state legislators by county to a district-based system.

== List of members representing the district ==
Representative	Party	Term	Note
James J. Wyatt	Republican	1993 – 1995	Elected in 1992.
Jeff Wasserburger	Republican	1995 – 2007	Elected in 1994. Re-elected in 1996. Re-elected in 1998. Re-elected in 2000. Re-elected in 2002. Re-elected in 2004.
Timothy Hallinan	Republican	2007 – 2011	Elected in 2006. Re-elected in 2008.
Norine Kasperik	Republican	2011 – 2017	Elected in 2010. Re-elected in 2012. Re-elected in 2014.
Timothy Hallinan	Republican	2017 – 2023	Elected in 2016. Re-elected in 2018. Re-elected in 2020.
Ken Clouston	Republican	2023 – present	Elected in 2022. Re-elected in 2024.

== Recent election results ==
=== 2014 ===
House district 32 general election
Party	Candidate	Votes	%
Republican	Norine Kasperik (Incumbent)	2,405	99.46%
Write-ins		13	0.53%
Total votes		2,418	100.0%
Invalid or blank votes		388	
Republican hold			

=== 2016 ===
House district 32 general election
Party	Candidate	Votes	%
Republican	Timothy Hallinan	3,713	98.64%
Write-ins		51	1.35%
Total votes		3,764	100.0%
Invalid or blank votes		785	
Republican hold			

=== 2018 ===
House district 32 general election
Party	Candidate	Votes	%
Republican	Timothy Hallinan (Incumbent)	2,223	67.36%
Democratic	Chad M. Trebby	1,070	32.42%
Write-ins		7	0.21%
Total votes		3,300	100.0%
Invalid or blank votes		130	
Republican hold			

=== 2020 ===
House district 32 general election
Party	Candidate	Votes	%
Republican	Timothy Hallinan (Incumbent)	3,980	85.92%
Democratic	Lynne Huskinson	632	13.64%
Write-ins		20	0.43%
Total votes		4,632	100.0%
Invalid or blank votes		371	
Republican hold			

=== 2022 ===
House district 32 general election
Party	Candidate	Votes	%
Republican	Ken Clouston	2,543	98.52%
Write-ins		38	1.47%
Total votes		2,581	100.0%
Invalid or blank votes		323	
Republican hold			

=== 2024 ===
House district 32 general election
Party	Candidate	Votes	%
Republican	Ken Clouston (Incumbent)	3,342	96.81%
Write-ins		110	3.18%
Total votes		3,452	100.0%
Invalid or blank votes		594	
Republican hold			

== Historical district boundaries ==
Map	Description	Apportionment Plan	Notes
	Campbell County (part)	1992 Apportionment Plan	
	Campbell County (part)	2002 Apportionment Plan	
	Campbell County (part)	2012 Apportionment Plan	
