= Matilda Hansen =

American politician (1929–2019)

Member of the Wyoming House of Representatives
- In office 1975–1995
- Succeeded by: Mike Massie
- Constituency: Albany County (1975-1992); 13th district (1993-1995)

Personal details
- Born: September 4, 1929 near Paullina, Iowa, U.S.
- Died: August 19, 2019 (aged 89) Laramie, Wyoming, U.S.
- Party: Democratic
- Education: University of Colorado Boulder; University of Wyoming
- Occupation: teacher

Matilda Hansen (September 4, 1929 – August 19, 2019) was an American politician in the state of Wyoming. She served in the Wyoming House of Representatives as a member of the Democratic Party.

She received a bachelor's degree in 1963 from the University of Colorado Boulder and a master's degree in geography in 1970 from the University of Wyoming. She was a High School Teacher from 1963–1965 in Colorado.

She represented Albany County in the legislature from 1975 to 1992, when the Wyoming Legislature switched from a county-based system to a numbered district-based system. Then, she represented the 13th district from 1993 to 1995.
