= Wyoming's 49th House of Representatives district =

American legislative district

Wyoming's 49th State House of Representatives district
- Wyoming's 49th House of Representatives district as of 2022
Representative
Robert Wharff; R–Evanston
- Demographics: 86% White; 10% Hispanic; 3% Multiracial
- Population (2022): 10,061

Wyoming's 49th House of Representatives district is one of 62 districts in the Wyoming House of Representatives. The district encompasses part of Uinta County. It is represented by Republican Representative Robert Wharff of Evanston.

In 1992, the state of Wyoming switched from electing state legislators by county to a district-based system.

== List of members representing the district ==
Representative	Party	Term	Note
Gordon L. Park	Republican	1993 – 1997	Elected in 1992. Re-elected in 1994.
Ken Decaria	Democratic	1997 – 1999	Elected in 1996.
Virginia Casady	Democratic	1999	Elected in 1998. Resigned in 1999.
C. Elaine Phillips	Democratic	1999 – 2001	Appointed in 1999.
Saundra Meyer	Democratic	2001 – 2005	Elected in 2000. Re-elected in 2002.
Bruce R. Barnard	Republican	2005 – 2007	Elected in 2004.
Saundra Meyer	Democratic	2007 – 2009	Elected in 2006. Re-elected in 2008. Resigned in 2009.
Terry Kimble	Democratic	2009 – 2011	Appointed in 2009.
Clarence J. Vranish	Republican	2011 – 2013	Elected in 2010.
Garry Piiparinen	Republican	2013 – 2021	Elected in 2012. Re-elected in 2014. Re-elected in 2016. Re-elected in 2018.
Robert Wharff	Republican	2021 – 2023	Elected in 2020.
Ryan Berger	Republican	2023 – 2025	Elected in 2022.
Robert Wharff	Republican	2025 – present	Elected in 2024.
David Walton	Republican	2027 – member-elect	Elected in 2026.

== Recent election results ==
=== 2014 ===
House district 49 general election
Party	Candidate	Votes	%
Republican	Garry Piiparinen (incumbent)	1,333	53.79%
Independent	Clarence Vranish	724	29.21%
Democratic	Larissa Sneider	417	16.82%
Write-ins		4	0.16%
Total votes		2,478	100.0%
Invalid or blank votes		51	
Republican hold			

=== 2016 ===
House district 49 general election
Party	Candidate	Votes	%
Republican	Garry Piiparinen (incumbent)	2,747	76.28%
Democratic	Larissa Sneider	829	23.02%
Write-ins		25	0.69%
Total votes		3,601	100.0%
Invalid or blank votes		164	
Republican hold			

=== 2018 ===
House district 49 general election
Party	Candidate	Votes	%
Republican	Garry Piiparinen (incumbent)	2,166	96.56%
Write-ins		77	3.43%
Total votes		2,243	100.0%
Invalid or blank votes		548	
Republican hold			

=== 2020 ===
House district 49 general election
Party	Candidate	Votes	%
Republican	Robert Wharff	3,269	94.83%
Write-ins		178	5.16%
Total votes		3,447	100.0%
Invalid or blank votes		661	
Republican hold			

=== 2022 ===
House district 49 general election
Party	Candidate	Votes	%
Republican	Ryan Berger	2,060	69.94%
Democratic	Tim Beppler	858	29.13%
Write-ins		27	0.91%
Total votes		2,945	100.0%
Invalid or blank votes		90	
Republican hold			

=== 2024 ===
House district 49 general election
Party	Candidate	Votes	%
Republican	Robert Wharff	3,046	89.85%
Write-ins		344	10.14%
Total votes		3,390	100.0%
Invalid or blank votes		828	
Republican hold			

== Historical district boundaries ==
Map	Description	Apportionment Plan	Notes
	Uinta County (part)	1992 Apportionment Plan	
	Uinta County (part)	2002 Apportionment Plan	
	Uinta County (part)	2012 Apportionment Plan	
