= Ken Clouston =

American politician

Member of the Wyoming House of Representatives from the 32nd district
- Incumbent
- Assumed office January 2, 2023
- Preceded by: Timothy Hallinan

Personal details
- Born: Bismarck, North Dakota
- Party: Republican
- Spouse(s): Christine S. Clouston, née Eixenberger
- Children: Cordell Clouston
- Education: B.S. in physical therapy, doctorate of physical therapy
- Alma mater: University of North Dakota
- Profession: Physical therapist

Ken Clouston is an American politician and businessman serving as a Republican member of the Wyoming House of Representatives from the 32nd district. He was elected unopposed in the 2022 Wyoming House of Representatives election on November 8, 2022.

== Biography ==
Clouston was born in Bismarck, North Dakota, and went to University of North Dakota to get both of his degrees, a Bachelors of Science in Physical Therapy in 1992, and a Doctorate of Physical Therapy in 2005. He is a Catholic. He is a member of the American Physical Therapy Association, the Wyoming Physical Therapy Association, and the North American Sports Medicine Institute. He lives in Gillette, Wyoming with his wife, Christine S. Clouston, née Eixenberger, who he married in June 1993. He graduated from Mandan High School in 1988.
