= Virginia Casady =

Wyoming politician

Member of the Wyoming House of Representatives from the 49th district
- In office 1999–1999
- Preceded by: Ken Decaria
- Succeeded by: C. Elaine Phillips

Personal details
- Party: Democratic

Virginia Casady is an American Democratic politician from Evanston, Wyoming. She was elected to the Wyoming House of Representatives in 1998 to represent the 49th district as a Democrat. She resigned in 1999 due to serious illness.
