= Timothy Hallinan (politician) =

American politician (born 1945)

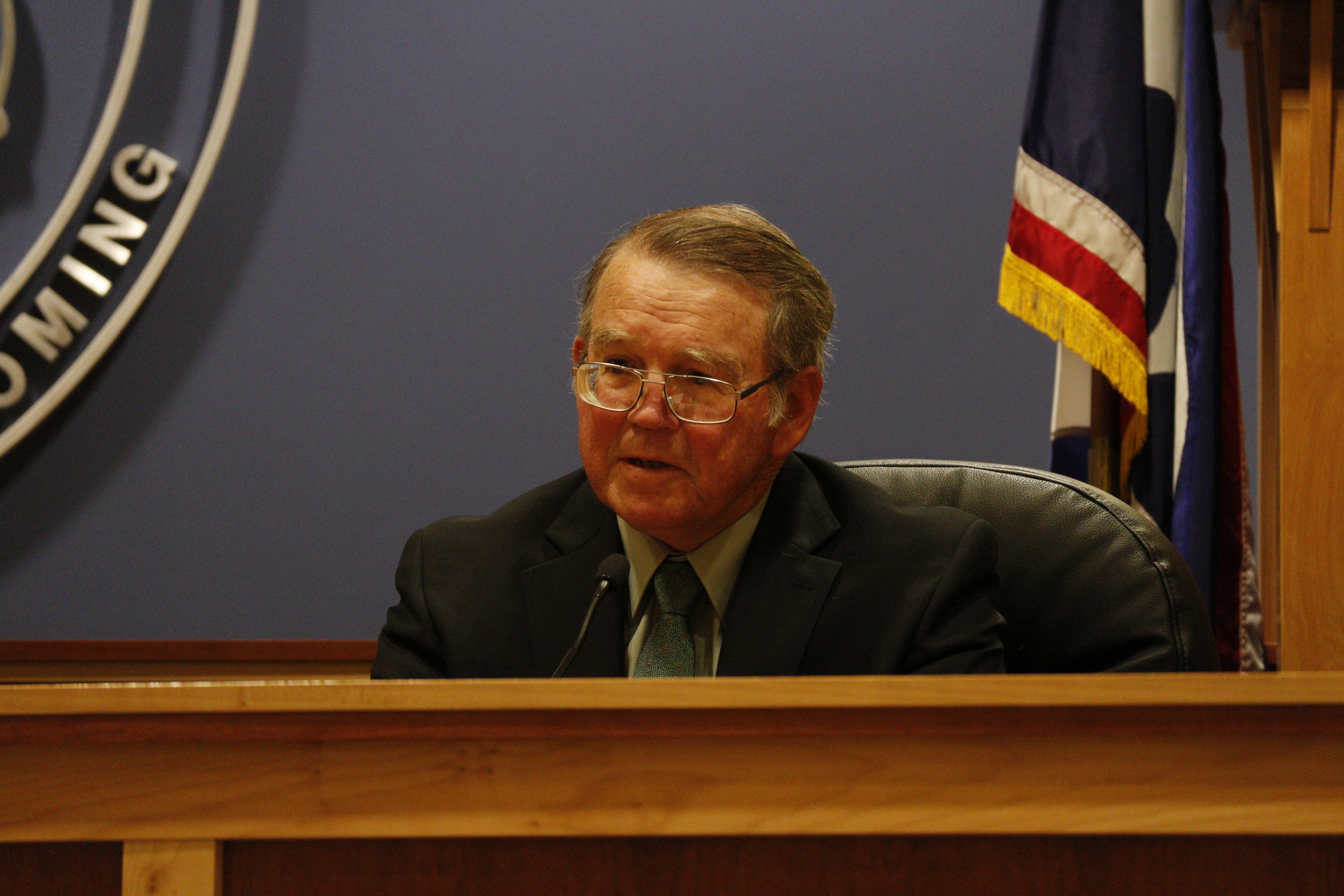
- Timothy Hallinan at Campbell County League of Women Voters' General Election Candidates' Forum in Gillette, Wyoming

Member of the Wyoming House of Representatives from the 32nd district
- In office January 10, 2017 – January 2023
- Preceded by: Norine Kasperik
- Succeeded by: Ken Clouston
- In office January 9, 2007 – January 11, 2011
- Preceded by: Jeff Wasserburger
- Succeeded by: Norine Kasperik

Personal details
- Born: April 28, 1945 (age 81) Pasadena, California, U.S.
- Party: Republican
- Spouse: Nancy Hallinan
- Children: 3
- Education: Stanford University; University of Utah
- Profession: Physician

Timothy Hallinan (born April 28, 1945) is an American politician who served as a Republican member of the Wyoming House of Representatives for District 32 from January 10, 2017 to January 2023.

== Career ==
Hallinan is a retired physician who previously served in the Wyoming House of Representatives from 2007 until 2011.

== Elections ==
=== 2016 ===
After incumbent Republican Representative Norine Kasperik announced her retirement, Hallinan declared his candidacy for the seat. He faced Republicans Don Dihle, Jarik Dudley, and Grant Lindblom in the primary. Hallinan won the primary with 42% of the vote. He ran unopposed in the general election.
