= Dan Laursen =

American politician

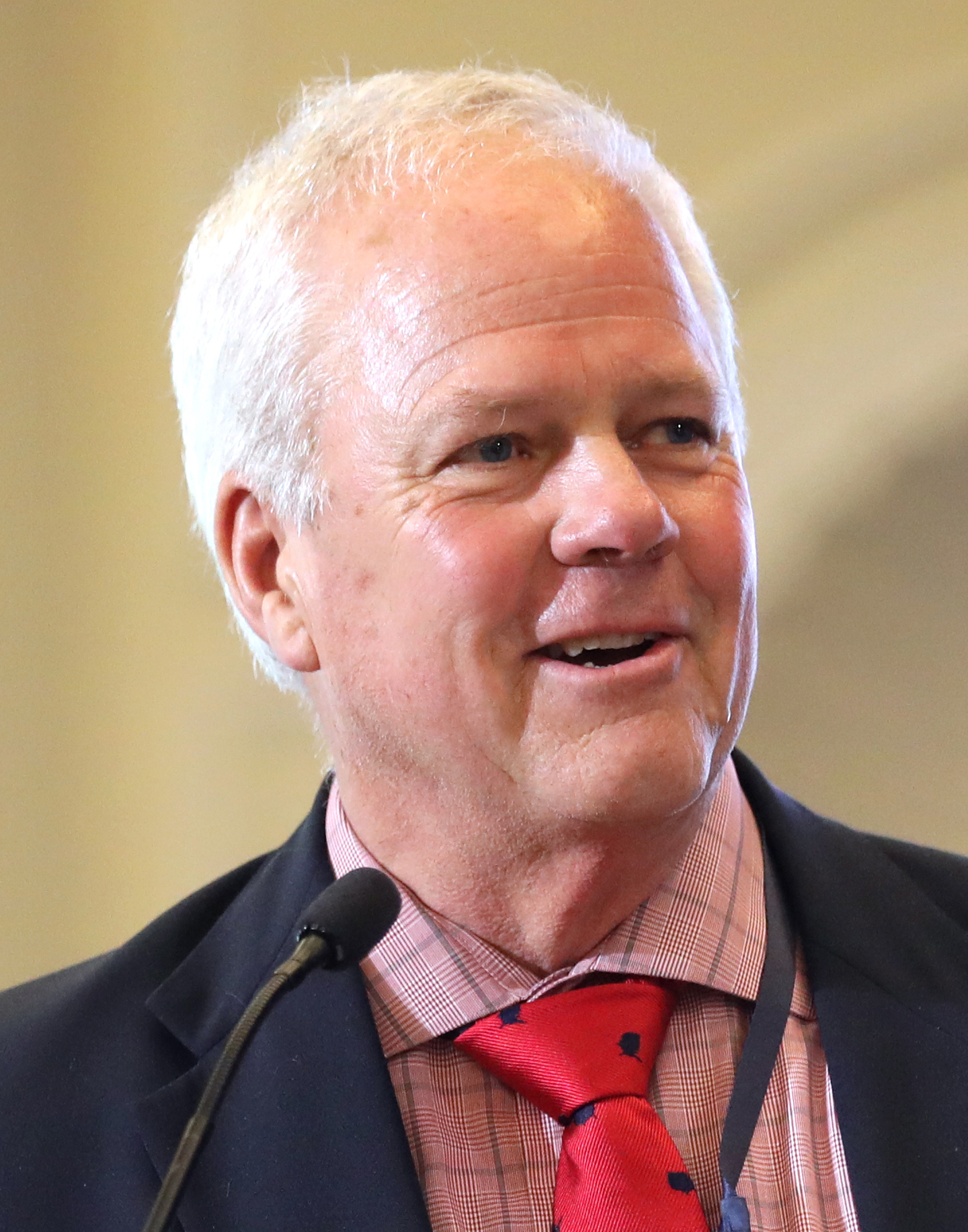

Member of the Wyoming Senate from the 19th district
- Incumbent
- Assumed office 2023
- Preceded by: R. J. Kost

Member of the Wyoming House of Representatives from the 25th district
- In office January 5, 2015 – 2023
- Preceded by: David Blevins
- Succeeded by: David Northrup

Personal details
- Born: March 9, 1960 (age 66) Laramie, Wyoming, U.S.
- Party: Republican
- Spouse: Denise Laursen
- Children: 2
- Education: Northwest College; University of Wyoming

Dan Laursen (born March 9, 1960) is an American politician and a Republican member of the Wyoming Senate representing District 19 since 2023. Laursen served as a member of the Wyoming House of Representatives representing District 25 from January 5, 2015 to 2023.

== Elections ==
=== 2014 ===
Laursen challenged one-term incumbent David Blevins in the Republican primary. He defeated Blevins, 55% to 45%. Laursen was then elected unopposed in the general election.

=== 2016 ===
Laursen was challenged by former Representative David Blevins in the Republican primary. Laursen defeated Blevins with 58% of the vote. He faced Democrat Shane Tillotson in the general election and defeated Tillotson with 78.9% of the vote.
