= Rosie Berger =

American politician

Member of the Wyoming House of Representatives from the 51st district
- In office January 14, 2003 – January 10, 2017
- Preceded by: Bruce Burns
- Succeeded by: Bo Biteman

Personal details
- Born: January 7, 1955 (age 71) Monroe, Wisconsin, U.S.
- Party: Republican
- Education: University of Wisconsin–Madison; Sheridan College; Regis University

Rosie M. Berger (born January 7, 1955, in Monroe, Wisconsin) is an American politician who was a member of the Wyoming House of Representatives representing District 51 from 14 January 2003 to 10 January 2017. Berger became the Wyoming House of Representatives speaker pro tempore on January 7, 2013. Berger is a member of the Republican Party.

== Education ==
Berger attended the University of Wisconsin–Madison and Sheridan College, and earned her BS in business administration from Regis University.

== Community service ==
Berger served for a time as the head of the Big Horn Chamber of Commerce. She was the chair of the Wyoming House Appropriations Committee, Speaker Pro Tempore, and Majority Leader. She was also chair of the Council of State Governments-West, and on the executive board of the National Conference of State Legislatures.

== Elections ==
- 2012 Berger was unopposed for both the August 21, 2012 Republican Primary, winning with 1,521 votes, and the November 6, 2012 General election, winning with 4,768 votes.
- 2002 When Republican Representative Bruce Burns ran for Wyoming Senate and left the District 51 seat open, Berger won the three-way August 20, 2002 Republican Primary by 25 votes with 778 votes (42.2%), and won the November 5, 2002 General election with 2,628 votes (63.9%) against Democratic nominee Gary Bare.
- 2004 Berger won the August 17, 2004 Republican Primary with 1,389 votes (64.7%), and the November 2, 2004 General election, winning with 3,532 votes (72.9%) against Democratic nominee Susan Cannon.
- 2006 Berger was unopposed for both the August 22, 2006 Republican Primary, winning with 1,581 votes, and the November 7, 2006 General election, winning with 3,656 votes.
- 2008 Berger was unopposed for both the August 19, 2008 Republican Primary, winning with 1,743 votes, and the November 4, 2008 General election, winning with 4,471 votes.
- 2010 Berger won the August 17, 2010 Republican Primary with 1,504 votes (63.7%), and was unopposed for the November 2, 2010 General election, winning with 3,437 votes.
