= Wyoming's 51st House of Representatives district =

American legislative district

Wyoming's 51st State House of Representatives district
- Wyoming's 51st House of Representatives district as of 2022
Representative
| Laurie Bratten; R–Sheridan |
- Demographics: 92% White; 1% Black; 3% Hispanic; 1% Native American; 1% Other; 2% Multiracial
- Population (2022): 9,715

Wyoming's 51st House of Representatives district is one of 62 districts in the Wyoming House of Representatives. The district encompasses part of Sheridan County. It is represented by Republican Representative Laurie Bratten of Sheridan.

In 1992, the state of Wyoming switched from electing state legislators by county to a district-based system.

== List of members representing the district ==
| Representative | Party | Term | Note |
|---|---|---|---|
| Virginia L. Wright | Republican | 1993 – 1995 | Elected in 1992. |
| Bruce Burns | Republican | 1995 – 2003 | Elected in 1994. Re-elected in 1996. Re-elected in 1998. Re-elected in 2000. |
| Rosie Berger | Republican | 2003 – 2017 | Elected in 2002. Re-elected in 2004. Re-elected in 2006. Re-elected in 2008. Re-elected in 2010. Re-elected in 2012. Re-elected in 2014. |
| Bo Biteman | Republican | 2017 – 2019 | Elected in 2016. |
| Cyrus Western | Republican | 2019 – 2025 | Elected in 2018. Re-elected in 2020. Re-elected in 2022. |
| Laurie Bratten | Republican | 2025 – present | Elected in 2024. |

== Recent election results ==
=== 2014 ===
House district 51 general election
| Party | Candidate | Votes | % |
|---|---|---|---|
| Republican | Rosie Berger (incumbent) | 3,233 | 97.55% |
| Write-ins | | 81 | 2.44% |
| Total votes | | 3,314 | 100.0% |
| Invalid or blank votes | | 663 | |
| Republican hold | | | |

=== 2016 ===
House district 51 general election
| Party | Candidate | Votes | % |
|---|---|---|---|
| Republican | Bo Biteman | 3,931 | 68.59% |
| Democratic | Hollis Hackman | 1,754 | 30.60% |
| Write-ins | | 46 | 0.80% |
| Total votes | | 5,731 | 100.0% |
| Invalid or blank votes | | 140 | |
| Republican hold | | | |

=== 2018 ===
House district 51 general election
| Party | Candidate | Votes | % |
|---|---|---|---|
| Republican | Cyrus Western | 4,140 | 98.19% |
| Write-ins | | 76 | 1.80% |
| Total votes | | 4,216 | 100.0% |
| Invalid or blank votes | | 831 | |
| Republican hold | | | |

=== 2020 ===
House district 51 general election
| Party | Candidate | Votes | % |
|---|---|---|---|
| Republican | Cyrus Western (incumbent) | 5,619 | 96.87% |
| Write-ins | | 181 | 3.12% |
| Total votes | | 5,800 | 100.0% |
| Invalid or blank votes | | 953 | |
| Republican hold | | | |

=== 2022 ===
House district 51 general election
| Party | Candidate | Votes | % |
|---|---|---|---|
| Republican | Cyrus Western (incumbent) | 3,631 | 93.10% |
| Write-ins | | 269 | 6.89% |
| Total votes | | 3,900 | 100.0% |
| Invalid or blank votes | | 825 | |
| Republican hold | | | |

=== 2024 ===
House district 51 general election
| Party | Candidate | Votes | % |
|---|---|---|---|
| Republican | Laurie Bratten | 4,910 | 95.67% |
| Write-ins | | 222 | 4.32% |
| Total votes | | 5,132 | 100.0% |
| Invalid or blank votes | | 1047 | |
| Republican hold | | | |

== Historical district boundaries ==
| Map | Description | Apportionment Plan | Notes |
|---|---|---|---|
| | Sheridan County (part) | 1992 Apportionment Plan | |
| | Sheridan County (part) | 2002 Apportionment Plan | |
| | Sheridan County (part) | 2012 Apportionment Plan | |
