= Ryan Berger =

American politician

Member of the Wyoming House of Representatives from the 49th district
- In office January 2, 2023 – January 2025
- Preceded by: Robert Wharff
- Succeeded by: Robert Wharff

Personal details
- Party: Republican

Ryan Berger is an American politician. He served as a Republican member for the 49th district of the Wyoming House of Representatives from 2023 to 2025.
