= Wyoming's 23rd State Senate district =

American legislative district

- Wyoming's 23rd State Senate district as of 2022
Senator
Eric Barlow; R–Gillette
- Demographics: 86% White; 1% Black; 8% Hispanic; 5% Multiracial
- Population (2022): 17,966

Wyoming's 23rd State Senate district is one of 31 districts in the Wyoming Senate. The district encompasses part of Campbell County. It is represented by Republican Senator Eric Barlow of Gillette.

In 1992, the state of Wyoming switched from electing state legislators by county to a district-based system.

== List of members representing the district ==
Representative	Party	Term	Note
Larry Gilbertz	Republican	1993 – 1999	Elected in 1992. Re-elected in 1994.
Steve Youngbauer	Republican	1999 – 2003	Elected in 1998.
John Hines	Republican	2003 – 2015	Elected in 2002. Re-elected in 2006. Re-elected in 2010.
Jeff Wasserburger	Republican	2015 – 2023	Elected in 2014. Re-elected in 2018.
Eric Barlow	Republican	2023 – present	Elected in 2022.

== Recent election results ==
=== 2006 ===
Senate district 23 general election
Party	Candidate	Votes	%
Republican	John Hines (incumbent)	4,125	72.45%
Democratic	L. J. Turner	1,568	27.54%
Total votes		5,693	100.0%
Republican hold			

=== 2010 ===
Senate district 23 general election
Party	Candidate	Votes	%
Republican	John Hines (incumbent)	5,882	99.39%
Write-ins		36	0.60%
Total votes		5,918	100.0%
Invalid or blank votes		637	
Republican hold			

=== 2014 ===
Senate district 23 general election
Party	Candidate	Votes	%
Republican	Jeff Wasserburger	4,110	98.53%
Write-ins		61	1.46%
Total votes		4,171	100.0%
Invalid or blank votes		695	
Republican hold			

=== 2018 ===
Senate district 23 general election
Party	Candidate	Votes	%
Republican	Jeff Wasserburger (incumbent)	5,116	98.21%
Write-ins		93	1.78%
Total votes		5,209	100.0%
Invalid or blank votes		723	
Republican hold			

=== 2022 ===
Senate district 23 general election
Party	Candidate	Votes	%
Republican	Eric Barlow	3,611	72.35%
Independent	Patricia Junek	1,369	27.42%
Write-ins		11	0.22%
Total votes		4,991	100.0%
Invalid or blank votes		149	
Republican hold			

== Historical district boundaries ==
Map	Description	Apportionment Plan	Notes
	Campbell County (part)	1992 Apportionment Plan	
	Campbell County (part)	2002 Apportionment Plan	
	Campbell County (part); Converse County (part)	2012 Apportionment Plan	
