= David Walton (politician) =

American politician

Member of the Wyoming House of Representatives from the 49th district
- member-elect
- Assumed office January 4, 2027
- Preceded by: Robert Wharff

Personal details
- Party: Republican
- Website: Campaign website

David Walton is an American politician. A member of the Republican Party, he is the member-elect of the Wyoming House of Representatives for the 49th district. He was elected at the 2026 election.
