= Wyoming's 13th House of Representatives district =

American legislative district

Wyoming's 13th State House of Representatives district
- Wyoming's 13th House of Representatives district as of 2022
Representative
Ken Chestek; D–Laramie
- Demographics: 79% White; 3% Black; 9% Hispanic; 5% Asian; 4% Multiracial
- Population (2022): 8,770

Wyoming's 13th House of Representatives district is one of 62 districts in the Wyoming House of Representatives. The district encompasses part of Albany County. It is represented by Democratic Representative Ken Chestek of Laramie.

In 1992, the state of Wyoming switched from electing state legislators by county to a district-based system.

== List of members representing the district ==
Representative	Party	Term	Note
Matilda Hansen	Democratic	1993 – 1995	Elected in 1992.
Mike Massie	Democratic	1995 – 1999	Elected in 1994. Re-elected in 1996.
Jim Rose	Democratic	1999 – 2000	Elected in 1998. Resigned in 2000.
Jane Warren	Democratic	2000 – 2009	Appointed in 2000. Re-elected in 2000. Re-elected in 2002. Re-elected in 2004. Re-elected in 2006.
Cathy Connolly	Democratic	2009 – 2023	Elected in 2008. Re-elected in 2010. Re-elected in 2012. Re-elected in 2014. Re-elected in 2016. Re-elected in 2018. Re-elected in 2020.
Ken Chestek	Democratic	2023 – present	Elected in 2022. Re-elected in 2024.

== Recent election results ==
=== 2014 ===
House district 13 general election
Party	Candidate	Votes	%
Democratic	Cathy Connolly (Incumbent)	1,571	95.09%
Write-ins		81	4.90%
Total votes		1,652	100.0%
Invalid or blank votes		550	
Democratic hold			

=== 2016 ===
House district 13 general election
Party	Candidate	Votes	%
Democratic	Cathy Connolly (Incumbent)	2,252	58.70%
Republican	Joey Correnti IV	1,564	40.77%
Write-ins		20	0.52%
Total votes		3,836	100.0%
Invalid or blank votes		182	
Democratic hold			

=== 2018 ===
House district 13 general election
Party	Candidate	Votes	%
Democratic	Cathy Connolly (Incumbent)	2,477	96.15%
Write-ins		99	3.84%
Total votes		2,576	100.0%
Invalid or blank votes		690	
Democratic hold			

=== 2020 ===
House district 13 general election
Party	Candidate	Votes	%
Democratic	Cathy Connolly (Incumbent)	3,004	92.45%
Write-ins		245	7.54%
Total votes		3,249	100.0%
Invalid or blank votes		928	
Democratic hold			

=== 2022 ===
House district 13 general election
Party	Candidate	Votes	%
Democratic	Ken Chestek	1,397	59.75%
Republican	Wayne B. Pinch	933	39.90%
Write-ins		8	0.34%
Total votes		2,338	100.0%
Invalid or blank votes		83	
Democratic hold			

=== 2024 ===
House district 13 general election
Party	Candidate	Votes	%
Democratic	Ken Chestek (Incumbent)	1,941	52.96%
Republican	Shane Swett	1,718	46.87%
Write-ins		6	0.16%
Total votes		3,665	100.0%
Invalid or blank votes		207	
Democratic hold			

== Historical district boundaries ==
Map	Description	Apportionment Plan	Notes
	Albany County (part)	1992 Apportionment Plan	
	Albany County (part)	2002 Apportionment Plan	
	Albany County (part)	2012 Apportionment Plan	
