= Cathy Connolly =

American politician (born 1956)

Minority Leader of the Wyoming House of Representatives
- In office January 10, 2017 – January 10, 2023
- Preceded by: Mary Throne
- Succeeded by: Mike Yin

Member of the Wyoming House of Representatives from the 13th district
- In office January 13, 2009 – January 10, 2023
- Preceded by: Jane Warren
- Succeeded by: Ken Chestek

Personal details
- Born: September 15, 1956 (age 70) Troy, New York, U.S.
- Party: Democratic
- Children: 1
- Education: Buffalo State College (BA); University at Buffalo (MA, JD, PhD)
- Website: Campaign website

Cathy Connolly (born September 15, 1956) is an American professor and politician from Wyoming. A Democrat, she is a former member of the Wyoming House of Representatives who represented the 13th district in Albany County. She is also a tenured professor at the University of Wyoming in Laramie.

== Early life and education ==
A native of Troy, New York, Connolly earned her B.S. from Buffalo State College. She then received three postgraduate degrees from the State University of New York at Buffalo: a Master of Arts (1989), a Juris Doctor (1991) and a PhD (1992). In 2009, Connolly completed Harvard University's John F. Kennedy School of Government program for Senior Executives in State and Local Government as a David Bohnett LGBTQ Victory Institute Leadership Fellow.

She moved to Laramie, Wyoming in 1992 when she accepted a faculty position at the University of Wyoming. Until 2000, she served as an adjunct professor in the Women's Studies Program in the College of Arts and Sciences. In 2000, she became director of the program, a post she held until 2006. Since 2006, she has been a professor, following six years as an associate professor in the sociology department.

A lesbian, she has a son, Lucas. She is the first ever openly gay member of the Wyoming State Legislature. She has authored a number of articles on sexuality including Out in the cowboy state: a look at lesbian and gay lives in Wyoming, published in the Journal of Gay and Lesbian Social Services in 2007. Connolly represents Laramie, the city in which Matthew Shepard was murdered in 1998 in what was believed to be an anti-gay hate crime. She is featured as a character in the play based on those events, The Laramie Project.

== Political career ==
The district Connolly represented is the 13th district (map), which fell entirely within the city of Laramie and contained a central portion of the city. Connolly was first elected to the legislature in 2008, winning the primary election unopposed. A Republican, Ember Oakley, filed to run against her in the general election but withdrew on August 29. She was therefore elected without opposition. She succeeded Democrat Jane Warren and took office in January 2009. In the 2009 legislature, she was appointed to the House Education Committee, to the House Travel, Recreation, Wildlife and Cultural Resources Committee and to the Select Committee on Legislative Facilities. She faced no opposition in 2010 and ran unopposed for re-election in 2012 and 2014.

Prior to becoming the representative from district 13, Connolly volunteered with the Wyoming Council for the Humanities. Connolly also served on the board of directors of Albany County SAFE Project and United Gays and Lesbians of Wyoming (now Wyoming Equality). She spent several years as a grant reviewer for the State Division of Victim Services and currently serves as a member of the State Department of Workforce Services' wage gap policy group. She is also a former chair of the parent board at Laramie's Whiting High School.

== Electoral record ==
2018 Wyoming House of Representatives election, District 13
Party	Candidate	Votes	%
Democratic	Cathy Connolly	2,252	59.01
Republican	Joey Correnti IV	1,564	40.98
Total votes		3,816	100%
Democratic hold			

2018 Wyoming House of Representatives election, District 13
Party	Candidate	Votes	%
Democratic	Cathy Connolly (incumbent)	2,477	96.2
Write-in		99	3.8
Total votes		2,576	100%
Democratic hold			

Wyoming's 13th State House District General Election, 2020
Party	Candidate	Votes	%	±%
Democratic	Cathy Connolly (incumbent)	3,004	92.5%	–3.7
Write-in		245	7.5%	+3.7
Total votes		3,249	100.0%	
Democratic hold				

Wyoming House of Representatives
Preceded by Mary Throne	Minority Leader of the Wyoming House of Representatives; 2017–2023	Succeeded by Mike Yin
