= Paul Barnard (politician) =

Republican member of the Wyoming Senate

Member of the Wyoming Senate from the 15th district
- In office January 11, 2011 – January 7, 2019
- Preceded by: Saundra Meyer
- Succeeded by: Wendy Davis Schuler

Personal details
- Born: 1947 or 1948 (age 78–79)
- Party: Republican
- Occupation: Optometrist

Paul Barnard is an American politician who served as a Republican member of the Wyoming Senate, representing the 15th district from 2011 until 2019. The 15th District encompasses Uinta County. Barnard was succeeded in office by Wendy Davis Schuler.
