= John Hines (Wyoming politician) =

American politician (1936–2024)

Member of the Wyoming Senate from the 23rd district
- In office 2003–2015
- Preceded by: Steven Youngbauer
- Succeeded by: Jeff Wasserburger

Member of the Wyoming House of Representatives
- In office 1985–2002
- Succeeded by: Jene Jansen
- Constituency: Campbell County (1985-1992); 31st district (1993-2002)

Personal details
- Born: March 3, 1936 Gillette, Wyoming, U.S.
- Died: January 26, 2024 (aged 87)
- Party: Republican
- Occupation: Rancher

John J. Hines (March 3, 1936 – January 26, 2024) was an American rancher and politician. He served in the Wyoming Senate from 2003 to 2015, representing the 23rd district. Hines previously served in the Wyoming House of Representatives from 1985 to 2002. Initially, Hines represented Campbell County in the Wyoming House, but after 1992, he was elected to represent the 31st district.

== Personal life ==
John J. Hines was of Irish descent. His grandfather, also John Hines, was born in Louisville, Kentucky, and raised in a Pennsylvania orphanage. John Hines settled in Wyoming in 1900, and died in 1930. Hines's only son, John Dwight Hines, operated the family ranch and married Annie McKenzie two years after his father's death. The couple raised four children, including John J. John Dwight died in 1952, and his wife ran the ranch until 1960, when John J. acquired it. John J. Hines raised sheep, and since 2009, cattle, on his ranch.

Hines died on January 26, 2024, at the age of 87.
