= 1998 United States House of Representatives election in Wyoming =

1998 United States House of Representatives election in Wyoming's at-large district
- November 3, 1998
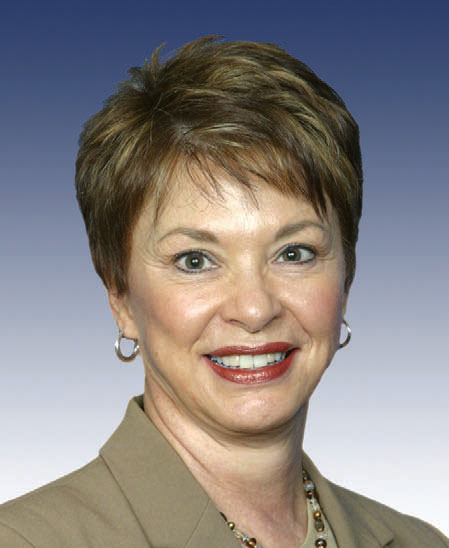

Nominee	Barbara Cubin	Scott Farris
Party	Republican	Democratic
Popular vote	100,687	67,399
Percentage	57.79%	38.69%
- County results Cubin: 40–50% 50–60% 60–70% 70–80% Farris: 40–50%
U.S. Representative before election
Barbara Cubin
Republican
Elected U.S. Representative
Barbara Cubin
Republican

The 1998 United States House of Representatives election in Wyoming was held on November 3, 1998. Incumbent Republican Congresswoman Barbara Cubin, first elected in 1994, ran for re-election to her third term. Scott Farris, a former aide to Governor Mike Sullivan, won the Democratic primary and faced Cubin in the general election. Cubin defeated Farris in a landslide, winning 58 percent of the vote to Farris's 39 percent.

== Democratic primary ==
=== Candidates ===
- Scott Farris, editor of the Wyoming Catholic Register and former aide to Governor Mike Sullivan
- John O'Steen, Casper physician
- Mickey Kalinay, 1996 Democratic candidate for the U.S. Senate

=== Results ===
Democratic primary results
Party	Candidate	Votes	%
Democratic	Scott Farris	19,706	64.33%
Democratic	John O'Steen	6,131	20.02%
Democratic	Mickey Kalinay	4,795	15.65%
Total votes		30,632	100.00%

== Republican primary ==
=== Candidates ===
- Barbara Cubin, incumbent U.S. Representative

=== Results ===
Republican primary results
Party	Candidate	Votes	%
Republican	Barbara Cubin (inc.)	73,201	100.00%
Total votes		73,201	100.00%

== General election ==
=== Results ===
1998 Wyoming's at-large congressional district general election results
Party	Candidate	Votes	%
Republican	Barbara Cubin (inc.)	100,687	57.79%
Democratic	Scott Farris	67,399	38.69%
Libertarian	Steve Richardson	6,133	3.52%
Total votes		174,219	100.00%
Republican hold			
