= UPMC Shadyside School of Nursing =

Public nursing school in Pittsburgh, Pennsylvania

Coordinates: 40.459778°N 79.927261°W

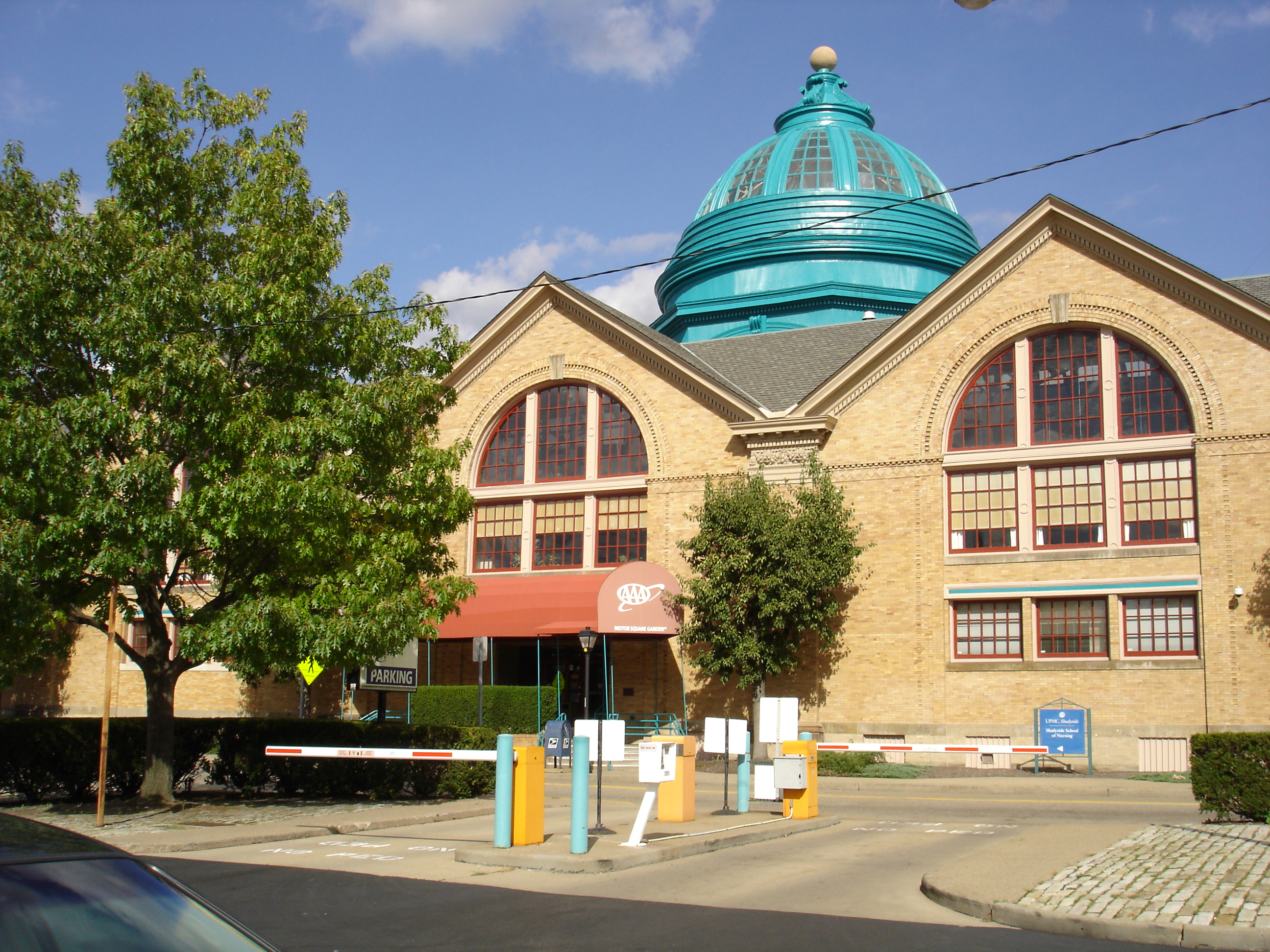
- Type: Private nursing school
- Established: 1884
- Students: 488
- Location: Pittsburgh, Pennsylvania, United States
- Campus: Urban
- Website: www.upmc.com/shyson

The UPMC Shadyside School of Nursing is a public nursing school in Pittsburgh, Pennsylvania. It was established in 1884 and is affiliated with UPMC (University of Pittsburgh Medical Center) Shadyside Hospital. It is located in the East Liberty neighborhood of Pittsburgh, Pennsylvania. The school is currently housed at 5900 Baum Blvd in the AAA Motor Square Garden building.

== History ==
Originally named the Pittsburgh Training School for Nurses, the school was founded in 1884 by three physicians from Pittsburgh Homeopathic Hospital: Dr. James H. McClelland, Dr. Lewis H. Willard and Dr. Charles F. Bingaman. They developed the idea for the school after a meeting with Florence Nightingale three years prior. The school was the first nursing school in Western Pennsylvania. In 1942 the school was renamed to Shadyside School of Nursing, four years after the hospital changed its name to Shadyside Hospital.

In December 2009, the UPMC Shadyside School of Nursing received an endowment of $900,000, the largest donation in the school's history, from 1939 alumnae Jane Pesci.

== Academics ==
The UPMC Shadyside School of Nursing offers a diploma in nursing. The school has an 18-month, full-time daylight program and 3-year, part-time evening/weekend program. The school is accredited by the National League for Nursing Accrediting Commission (NLNAC) and approved by the State Board of Nursing Commonwealth of Pennsylvania. The school also received the Center of Excellence designation for 2009–2012 by the National League for Nursing.

== Notable alumni ==
- Mary Roberts Rinehart
