= Dave Bonner (politician) =

American politician

Member of the Wyoming House of Representatives from the 25th district
- In office 2009–2013
- Succeeded by: David Blevins

Personal details
- Born: March 20, 1940 (age 86)
- Party: Republican
- Education: University of Wyoming

Dave Bonner (born March 20, 1940) is an American politician who was a member of the Wyoming House of Representatives. Bonner served on the Powell City Council.
