= Tom Kinnison =

American politician

Member of the Wyoming Senate
- In office January 11, 1983 – January 14, 2003
- Succeeded by: Bruce Burns
- Constituency: Sheridan County (1983–1992); 21st district (1993–2003)

Member of the Wyoming House of Representatives from the Sheridan County district
- In office January 9, 1979 – January 11, 1983

Personal details
- Born: August 30, 1947 Buffalo, Wyoming
- Died: July 1, 2018 (aged 70) Sheridan, Wyoming
- Party: Republican

Tom Kinnison (August 30, 1947 – July 1, 2018) was an American politician. He served in the Wyoming House of Representatives from 1979 to 1983. From 1983 to 1992, Kinnison represented Sheridan County in the Wyoming Senate. From 1993 to 2003, he represented the 21st state Senate district.

He died of cancer on July 1, 2018, in Sheridan, Wyoming, at age 70.
