= 1998 Wyoming state elections =

A general election was held in the U.S. state of Wyoming on Tuesday, November 3, 1998. All of the state's executive officers—the Governor, Secretary of State, Auditor, Treasurer, and Superintendent of Public Instruction—were up for election. In addition, seats in both houses of the Wyoming Legislature were up, as well as the state's sole seat in the U.S. House of Representatives.

== Governor ==
Incumbent Republican Governor Jim Geringer ran for re-election to a second term. He won the Republican primary in a landslide, and then faced State Senator John Vinich, who won a contested Democratic primary, in the general election. Owing in part to the state's Republican lean, Geringer defeated Vinich by a wide margin, winning 56% of the vote to Vinich's 41%.

Wyoming gubernatorial election, 1998
Party	Candidate	Votes	%	±%
Republican	Jim Geringer (inc.)	97,235	55.60	−3.12%
Democratic	John Vinich	70,754	40.46	+0.28%
Libertarian	Dave Dawson	6,899	3.94	+2.83%
Total votes		174,888	100.00	
Republican hold				

== Secretary of State ==
First-term Secretary of State Diana Ohman, a Republican, opted against seeking re-election to a second term, creating an open seat. Former state attorney general Joe Meyer; Johnnie Burton, the former director of the state department of revenue and a former state representative; and Lorraine Quarberg, the former chair of the Republican Party of Wyoming, all ran in the Republican primary to succeed Ohman. Former State Representative Steve Cranfill initially ran in the Republican primary, as well, but dropped out of the race shortly after joining. Shortly after the race started, Burton was in a near-fatal automobile accident, prompting Meyer to suspend his campaign while she recovered. Several weeks later, Burton was cleared to return to the campaign trail, but acknowledged that the limitations on her mobility could affect her ability to connect with voters.

Meyer staked out a position as the frontrunner in the race, earning endorsements from the state's most prominent Republicans, including former U.S. Senator Alan Simpson and former Secretary of Defense Dick Cheney, and from the Wyoming Education Association. He was ultimately able to win the primary by a wide margin, receiving 45% of the vote to Burton's 29% and Quarberg's 26%.

In the general election, Meyer faced E. Jayne Mockler, a State Senator from Cheyenne, who won the Democratic primary unopposed. The campaign grew acrimonious quickly, with Mockler accusing Meyer of telling a group of county officials that he met with Governor Jim Geringer "to discuss what his duties would be as lieutenant governor." She argued that he was "demonstrating the same kind of arrogance and behind-the-door behavior that Jim Geringer has displayed during the past four years." Meyer admitted the meeting, but Geringer's press secretary denied it, noting that "the only 'meeting' that occurred basin Jayne's head" and suggesting that she was "hallucinating." The candidates also sparred on the issue of public lands, with Mockler accusing Meyer of being out of touch with the needs of the state's hunters, and with Meyer accusing her of "dirty politics" and for taking his words out of context.

In the end, Meyer defeated Mockler by a wide margin to win his first term as Secretary of State, receiving 60% of the vote to her 40%. He won a wide victory throughout the state, losing only Sweetwater County to Mockler.

=== Democratic primary ===
==== Candidates ====
- E. Jayne Mockler, State Senator

==== Results ====
Democratic Party primary results
Party	Candidate	Votes	%
Democratic	E. Jayne Mockler	30,288	100.00
Total votes		30,288	100.00

=== Republican primary ===
==== Candidates ====
- Joe Meyer, former Attorney General of Wyoming
- Johnnie Burton, former Director of the Wyoming Department of Revenue, former State Representative
- Lorraine Quarberg, former Chairwoman of the Republican Party of Wyoming

==== Results ====
Republican Primary results
Party	Candidate	Votes	%
Republican	Joe Meyer	35,858	45.02
Republican	Johnnie Burton	22,822	28.65
Republican	Lorraine Quarberg	20,973	26.33
Total votes		79,653	100.00

=== General election ===
==== Results ====
2002 Wyoming Secretary of State election
Party	Candidate	Votes	%	±%
Republican	Joe Meyer	102,145	60.21%	−6.21%
Democratic	E. Jayne Mockler	67,511	39.79%	+6.21%
Majority		34,634	20.41%	−12.41%
Turnout		169,656		
Republican hold				

Results by county Meyer: 50–60%; 60–70%; 70–80%; Mockler: 50–60%

== Auditor ==
Incumbent State Auditor Dave Ferrari, a Republican, opted against seeking a third term. Max Maxfield, the former director of the state department of commerce, and Bob Grieve, the President of the State Senate, ran in the Republican primary to succeed him. Grieve entered the race as the heavy frontrunner, and significantly outraised and outspent Maxfield. However, Maxfield found success in attacking Grieve over the conflict of interest he would face as State Auditor in sitting on the State Land Board while holding state leases. Grieve denied that he directly held any state leases, but instead held stock in companies that themselves held leases. In the end, Maxfield narrowly defeated Grieve, winning 52% of the vote to Grieve's 48%, perhaps in large part due to his ability to weaponize Grieve's financial holdings.

No Democratic candidates filed to run for Auditor. However, Deputy State Auditor Jan Washburn received 350 write-in votes in the Democratic primary, entitling her to the party's nomination. She declined to accept it, leaving the party without a nominee. Accordingly, Maxfield was elected unopposed.

=== Democratic primary ===
No Democratic candidates filed.

=== Republican primary ===
==== Candidates ====
- Max Maxfield, former Director of the Wyoming Department of Commerce
- Robert Grieve, President of the State Senate

==== Results ====
Republican Primary results
Party	Candidate	Votes	%
Republican	Max Maxfield	41,731	51.68
Republican	Robert Grieve	39,024	48.32
Total votes		80,755	100.00

=== General election ===
==== Results ====
1998 Wyoming Auditor election
Party	Candidate	Votes	%
Republican	Max Maxfield	139,441	100.00%
Total votes		139,441	
Republican hold			

Results by county Maxfield: 90–100%

== Treasurer ==
Incumbent State Treasurer Stan Smith, a Republican, declined to seek re-election. Cynthia Lummis, Governor Jim Geringer's general counsel and a former state senator, won the Republican primary unopposed. In the general election, she faced Butch Loveridge, the Democratic nominee, and James Blomquist, the Libertarian nominee. The ensuing campaign was largely non-controversial. Lummis campaigned on bringing innovative solutions to making state investments, like bringing local investment managers into the decision-making process. Lummis ultimately won the general election in a landslide, winning 63% of the vote to Loveridge's 31% and Blomquist's 6%.

1998 Wyoming Treasurer election
Party	Candidate	Votes	%	±%
Republican	Cynthia Lummis	105,332	62.69%	−2.51%
Democratic	Butch Loveridge	52,655	31.34%	−3.46%
Libertarian	Blomquist	10,024	5.97%	+5.97%
Majority		52,677	31.35%	+0.95%
Turnout		168,011		
Republican hold				

Results by county Lummis: 50–60%; 60–70%; 70–80%; Loveridge: 50–60%

== Superintendent of Public Instruction ==
Incumbent Superintendent of Public Instruction Judy Catchpole, a Republican, ran for re-election to a second term. She was opposed by Gene Lane, the Democratic nominee and the head of an alternative junior high school in Sweetwater County School District 1, and both won their primaries unopposed. In the general election, Lane won the endorsement of the Wyoming Education Association and the Wyoming Public Employees Association. Catchpole ended up easily defeating Lane to win a second term, though the race was closer than most other statewide elections.

=== Democratic primary ===
==== Candidates ====
- Gene Lane, head of alternative public junior high school

==== Results ====
Democratic Party primary results
Party	Candidate	Votes	%
Democratic	Gene Lane	28,956	100.00
Total votes		28,956	100.00

=== Republican primary ===
==== Candidates ====
- Judy Catchpole, incumbent Superintendent of Public Instruction

==== Results ====
Republican Party primary results
Party	Candidate	Votes	%
Republican	Judy Catchpole (inc.)	72,064	100.00
Total votes		72,064	100.00

=== General election ===
==== Results ====
2006 Wyoming Superintendent of Public Instruction election
Party	Candidate	Votes	%	±%
Republican	Judy Catchpole (inc.)	98,289	57.25%	−0.44%
Democratic	Gene Lane	73,393	42.75%	+0.44%
Turnout		171,682		
Republican hold				

Results by county Catchpole: 50–60%; 60–70%; 70–80%; Lane: 50–60%; 60–70%

== US Representative ==
1998 Wyoming's at-large congressional district general election results
Party	Candidate	Votes	%
Republican	Barbara Cubin (inc.)	100,687	57.79%
Democratic	Scott Farris	67,399	38.69%
Libertarian	Steve Richardson	6,133	3.52%
Total votes		174,219	100.00%
Republican hold			
