= Mike Massie =

American politician

Member of the Wyoming Senate from the 9th district
- In office 1999–2010
- Preceded by: Vincent Picard
- Succeeded by: Chris Rothfuss

Member of the Wyoming House of Representatives from the 13th district
- In office 1995–1998
- Preceded by: Matilda Hansen
- Succeeded by: Jim Rose

Personal details
- Born: January 8, 1954 (age 72) Akron, Ohio, U.S.
- Party: Democratic
- Spouse: Ruth Massie
- Education: University of Akron; University of Wyoming

Mike Massie (born January 8, 1954) is an American politician. A Democratic former member of the Wyoming Senate, Massie represented the 9th district from 1999 to 2010. He previously served in the Wyoming House of Representatives, representing the 13th district, from 1995 through 1998.

After considering a run for governor in 2010, he instead sought the position of State Superintendent of Public Instruction. He was defeated in the general election by the Republican Cindy Hill of Cheyenne, 113,026 votes (59.2 percent) to 71,772 (37.6 percent). Hill had unseated incumbent Jim McBride in the Republican primary.
