= Steven Youngbauer =

American lawyer and politician

Steven Youngbauer (born February 25, 1950) is an American lawyer and retired politician.

== Life and career ==
A native of Alma, Wisconsin, born on February 25, 1950, Youngbauer attended Winona State College and completed his legal studies at the University of Wyoming College of Law in 1982. At the time of his 1998 campaign to succeed Larry Gilbertz in Wyoming Senate district 23, Youngbauer was the manager of ranching operations for Amax Land Company. Youngbauer left office at the end of his four-year term, and was succeeded by John Hines.
