= Bruce Burns =

American politician

Member of the Wyoming Senate from the 21st district
- In office January 3, 2003 – January 7, 2019
- Preceded by: Tom Kinnison
- Succeeded by: Bo Biteman

Member of the Wyoming House of Representatives from the 51st district
- In office January 3, 2001 – January 3, 2003
- Preceded by: Virginia Wright
- Succeeded by: Rosie Berger

Personal details
- Born: June 30, 1952 (age 74)
- Party: Republican

Bruce Burns (born June 30, 1952) is a Republican member of the Wyoming Senate, representing the 21st district since 2003. He previously served in the House from 1995 to 2002.
