= Bill Vasey =

American politician

Member of the Wyoming Senate from the 11th district
- In office 1999 – 2009
- Preceded by: Bob Grieve
- Succeeded by: James E. Elliott, Jr.

Member of the Wyoming House of Representatives
- In office 1984–1994
- Succeeded by: Tony Rose
- Constituency: Carbon County (1984-1992); 15th district (1992-1994)

Personal details
- Born: January 13, 1939 (age 87) Saratoga, Wyoming, U.S.
- Party: Democratic
- Spouse: Judith
- Education: Valley City State Teachers College; University of Wyoming
- Profession: Educator

Bill Vasey (born January 13, 1939) is an American politician who served as a Democratic member of the Wyoming Senate, representing the 11th district from 1999 to 2009.

Before serving in the state senate, Vasey served in the Wyoming House of Representatives from 1984 to 1994. Initially, he represented Carbon County. In 1992, the Wyoming Legislature switched from a county-based system to a numbered district based system. For his final term, Vasey was elected to represent the 15th House district.
