= Ken Decaria =

American politician (born 1953)

Minority Leader of the Wyoming Senate
- In office 2007–2008
- Preceded by: Rae Lynn Job
- Succeeded by: Kathryn Sessions

Member of the Wyoming Senate from the 15th district
- In office 1999–2009
- Preceded by: Gregory A. Phillips
- Succeeded by: Saundra Meyer

Member of the Wyoming House of Representatives from the 49th district
- In office 1997–1998
- Preceded by: Gordon L. Park
- Succeeded by: Virginia Casady

Personal details
- Born: November 5, 1953 (age 72) Ogden, Utah, U.S.
- Party: Democratic
- Spouse: Peggy
- Profession: educator

Ken Decaria (born November 5, 1953) is an American politician who served as a Democratic member of the Wyoming Senate, representing the 15th district from 1999 to 2009. He resigned in 2009 to take a position with the Wyoming Education Association. Decaria previously served in the Wyoming House of Representatives, representing the 49th district, from 1997 through 1998.
