= Grant Larson =

American politician (1933–2020)

Member of the Wyoming Senate from the 17th district
- In office January 10, 1995 – January 11, 2011
- Preceded by: Bob LaLonde
- Succeeded by: Leland Christensen

Personal details
- Born: June 2, 1933 Provo, Utah, U.S.
- Died: September 11, 2020 (aged 87) Jackson, Wyoming, U.S.
- Party: Republican

Grant Larson (June 2, 1933 – September 11, 2020) was an American politician who served in the Wyoming Senate from the 17th district from 1995 to 2011.

Larson was born in Provo, Utah and went to the University of Utah. Larson served in the United States Air Force. He was a business owner in Jackson, Wyoming. Larson served on the Teton County Commission. He died on September 11, 2020, in Jackson, Wyoming at age 87.
