= Tex Boggs =

American academic and retired politician

Member of the Wyoming Senate from the 13th district
- In office 1999–2006
- Succeeded by: John Hastert

Personal details
- Born: May 13, 1938 (age 88) Washington County, Tennessee
- Party: Democratic
- Profession: academic

Tex Lee Boggs (born May 13, 1938) is an American academic and retired politician who was a state senator in the Wyoming Senate from 1999 to 2006. He was president of Western Wyoming Community College and provost of Antioch University Los Angeles.

== Career ==
Tex Boggs was elected as a state senator for Senate District 13 in the Wyoming Senate in 1998.

Boggs was president of Western Wyoming Community College for 20 years, and left in 2008.

Dr. Tex Boggs was appointed Interim president and Provost of University of Maine at Fort Kent in 2019.
