= 2006 Wyoming Senate election =

- November 7, 2006

15 of 30 seats in the Wyoming Senate
	Majority party	Minority party
Leader	Grant Larson	Rae Lynn Job
Party	Republican	Democratic
Leader's seat	23rd district	12th district
Seats before	23	7
Seats after	23	7
Seat change	Steady	Steady
Popular vote	49,212	36,690
Percentage	56.93%	42.44%
- Results by district
Senate President before election
Grant Larson
Republican
Elected Senate President
John Schiffer
Republican

The 2006 Wyoming Senate election was held on November 7, 2006, to elect members to the Wyoming Senate for its 59th session as part of the 2006 United States elections. Partisan primaries were held on August 22. Neither party gained any seats in the legislature.

== Predictions ==
Source	Ranking	As of
Rothenberg	Safe R	November 4, 2006

== Results ==
General election summary
Party	Candidates	Votes	%	Seats				
Party	Candidates	Votes	%	Before 58th Leg.	Up	Won	After 59th Leg.	+/–
Republican	14	49,212	56.93	23	10	10	23	Steady
Democratic	7	36,690	42.44	7	5	5	7	Steady
Independents	1	544	0.63	0	0	0	0	Steady
Total		86,446	100%	30	15		30	Steady

Popular vote
Republican	56.93%
Democratic	42.44%
Independents	0.63%

Seats won
Republican	66.67%
Democratic	33.33%

Total senate seats
Republican	86.67%
Democratic	13.33%
