= Kathy Karpan =

American politician (1942–2025)

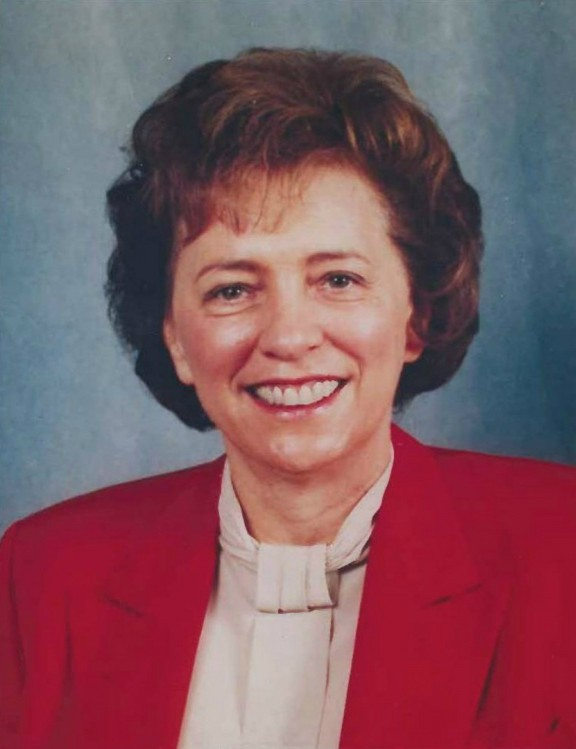

Director of the Office of Surface Mining Reclamation and Enforcement
- In office August 4, 1997 – April 10, 2000
- President: Bill Clinton
- Preceded by: Kay Henry
- Succeeded by: Kay Henry

17th Secretary of State of Wyoming
- In office January 5, 1987 – January 2, 1995
- Governor: Mike Sullivan
- Preceded by: Thyra Thomson
- Succeeded by: Diana Ohman

Personal details
- Born: September 1, 1942 Rock Springs, Wyoming, U.S.
- Died: October 24, 2025 (aged 83) Cheyenne, Wyoming, U.S.
- Party: Democratic
- Education: University of Wyoming (BA, MA); University of Oregon (JD)
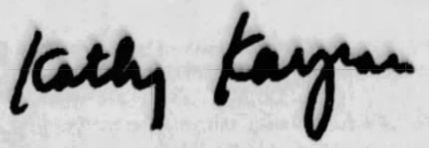
- Signature

Kathleen Marie Karpan (September 1, 1942 – October 24, 2025) was an American politician who served as Secretary of State of Wyoming from 1987 to 1995, and as the director of the federal Office of Surface Mining Reclamation and Enforcement from 1997 to 2000. A member of the Democratic Party, she unsuccessfully ran for Wyoming's governor and United States senator as the Democratic nominee in 1994 and 1996, respectively. She is the most recent Democrat to serve as Wyoming Secretary of State or any other statewide office aside from Dave Freudenthal's service as governor from 2003 to 2011.

Karpan was born in Rock Springs, Wyoming, and grew up in both Rock Springs and Rawlins. She received bachelor's and master's degrees from the University of Wyoming and a Juris Doctor degree from the University of Oregon School of Law. In the 1960s and early 1970s, Karpan worked for Representative Teno Roncalio as his staff assistant and press secretary. From 1979 to 1986, Karpan worked in the United States Department of Commerce and the office of the Wyoming Attorney General, and served as director of the Wyoming Department of Health and Social Services. She also served as a campaign manager for Rodger McDaniel during the 1982 United States Senate election in Wyoming. Karpan was the Democratic nominee in the 1994 gubernatorial and 1996 Senate elections, but lost both elections to Republicans Jim Geringer and Mike Enzi, respectively.

In 1997, Karpan was appointed by President Bill Clinton, whose presidential campaigns she supported, to serve as the first female director of the Office of Surface Mining Reclamation and Enforcement. In early 2000, she stepped down and took another position in the interior department, while applying for another job that raised concerns about potential conflicts of interest. Upon the end of the Clinton administration in 2001, Karpan returned to her law practice in Cheyenne.

== Early life ==
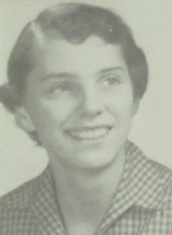
Kathy Karpan in 1960

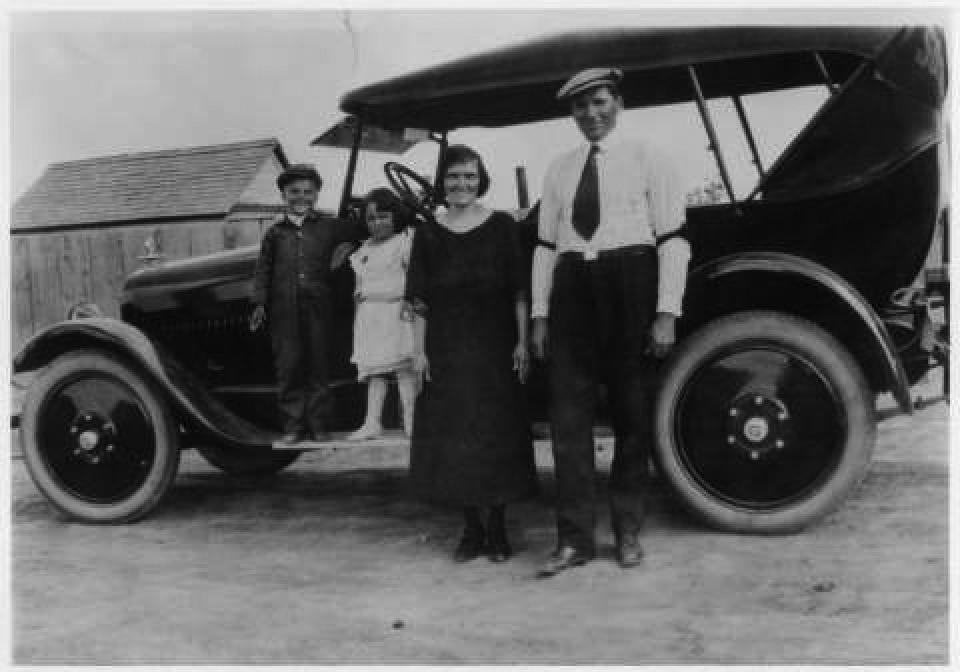
Kathy Karpan's mother and her family in the 1920s

Kathleen Marie Karpan was born in Rock Springs, Wyoming, on September 1, 1942, to Thomas and Pauline Karpan. She was the family's first child, with two younger siblings named Judy and Frank. The family lived in a heavily Democratic, unionized coal mining community. As an elementary school student, she displayed a bumper sticker supporting Adlai Stevenson II, the Democratic presidential candidate, on her bicycle. Thomas, a coal miner, worked for the Union Pacific Railroad on a rail line servicing coal mines from Rock Springs to Superior. In 1952, the railroad closed its coal mines and transferred Thomas, prompting the family to move around 100 miles from Rock Springs to Rawlins.

Pauline's health was declining, and she died in December 1954, at the age of 37. The family moved back to Rock Springs, where relatives could help take care of the children. The family considered sending the children to St. Joseph’s Children’s Home in Torrington, but Kathy, then aged 12, committed to help care for her siblings to avoid going to the orphanage. The family then moved back to Rawlins.

In 1960, Karpan graduated from Rawlins High School, and was offered a scholarship to the University of Wyoming College of Commerce and Industry. An honors student, she chose to major in journalism and served as editor of the student newspaper, The Branding Iron, from spring 1963 through spring 1964. As editor, she attended a speech by President John F. Kennedy at the school in September 1963. In summer 1964, she worked a brief stint as society editor for the Rawlins Daily Times. During Wyoming's 1964 House of Representatives election, Karpan served as an officer of the Wyoming Students for Teno Roncalio for Congress, a public relations committee supporting Roncalio's campaign. She earned her bachelor's degree in journalism in 1964.

== Early career ==
Karpan's first journalism job was at the Cody Enterprise. After Roncalio was elected, he hired Karpan as his staff assistant and press secretary. Roncalio later lost his campaign for the Senate in 1966. After a few short-term jobs, Karpan returned to the University of Wyoming to pursue a master’s degree in American studies. She protested against the dismissal of the Black 14 from the school's football team in October 1969. One month later, she protested the Vietnam War at a march in Washington, D.C., and wrote about her experience in an unofficial student publication, Free Lunch. She finished her coursework, but could not select a topic for her thesis. Karpan then worked in Canberra for several months, converting political stories from print media to broadcasting at the Australian capital.

In 1970, Roncalio regained his seat in the House of Representatives, and hired Karpan to be his chief of staff. Karpan returned to the University of Wyoming in January 1975 to finish her master's thesis on Jack R. Gage, former secretary of state and governor of Wyoming. In 1978, Karpan graduated with a Juris Doctor degree from the University of Oregon School of Law. From 1979 to 1981, Karpan worked as an attorney in the Economic Development Administration of the United States Department of Commerce. She first served as deputy director for congressional relations, then as the acting deputy legal counsel after passing the bar exam.

During the 1982 Senate election, Karpan served as campaign manager for Rodger McDaniel, but McDaniel was defeated by the incumbent Republican, Malcolm Wallop. She then served as an assistant attorney general in the office of the Wyoming Attorney General from 1983 to 1984, under Archie G. McClintock. Her duties included representing the state's boards and commissions. In her role as counsel for the Wyoming Board of Medicine, Karpan helped the board investigate allegations of sexual misconduct concerning John Story, a physician from Lovell. The board revoked Story's license.

Karpan supported Senator Gary Hart during the 1984 Democratic presidential primaries, and served as a delegate for Hart to the Democratic National Convention. Governor Edgar Herschler appointed her as director of the Wyoming Department of Health and Social Services, and she took office in December 1984. She reorganized the department's budget, and in response to a legislative budget reduction, eliminated 10 administrative positions to prioritize client-facing positions at the agency's county offices. She resigned on June 5, 1986, to run for secretary of state. She was succeeded by Lawrence Cohen.

== Wyoming Secretary of State ==
Karpan announced that she would seek the Democratic nomination for secretary of state of Wyoming in 1986, and selected H. L. Jensen and Roncalio's wife to serve as the co-chairs of her campaign. She won the Democratic nomination without opposition after spending $13,832. In the general election Karpan defeated Republican nominee K. C. Thomson, who was the son of incumbent secretary of state Thyra Thomson. She coordinated the 1989 congressional special election, the first statewide special election in Wyoming's history, after Dick Cheney resigned to serve as US secretary of defense. She was also the defendant in Gorin v. Karpan, a reapportionment case that required the state's legislators to be elected from districts of equal population, rather than by county. Following the court's decision, Karpan helped county clerks implement the new districts and redraw precinct boundaries. During her tenure, her office also transitioned from paper to electronic recordkeeping.

On April 25, 1990, Karpan announced that she was seeking a second term as secretary of state. She faced no opposition in the Democratic primary and defeated Republican nominee Tom Zollinger after spending $56,441 against Zollinger's $24,745. Karpan won in every county.

During the 1988 Democratic presidential primaries, Karpan endorsed Tennessee Senator Al Gore for the party's nomination after initially supporting Governor Bruce Babbitt, and during the 1992 Democratic presidential primaries, she endorsed Arkansas Governor Bill Clinton. On November 1, 1992, Governor Mike Sullivan and Karpan published a letter calling for Wyoming voters to support Clinton. They criticized President George H. W. Bush for his negative campaign tactics, such as the Willie Horton ad during the 1988 presidential election. Clinton won the election, and offered Karpan a high-level role in his administration. However, she declined the offer so that she could finish her term as Secretary of State.

Karpan did not seek re-election in 1994, instead opting to run for governor. On January 2, 1995, Karpan was succeeded as secretary of state by Republican Diana Ohman.

== Gubernatorial and senatorial campaigns ==
In 1994, Karpan met with representatives of the Democratic Senatorial Campaign Committee to consider running in that year's Senate election. Sullivan was also considering running for the same seat, and Karpan indicated that she would not commit to running for any office until Sullivan made his own decision. Sullivan ultimately ran for the Senate seat, and on April 18, Karpan announced that she would run for governor. She faced no opposition in the Democratic primary. During the general election campaign, Karpan accused staffers for her Republican opponent, Jim Geringer, of spreading rumors that she is a closeted lesbian. Karpan denied being a lesbian, calling the rumors a scare tactic, but caused controversy when she said, "Now I have to prove I'm a normal human being... and I am... I know I'm a decent, normal, moral person." Karpan apologized for the remarks, indicating that she respects the gay community. She lost in the general election to Geringer. By then, Wyoming's voting patterns trended towards favoring Republicans, due to an increase in straight-ticket voting and opposition to Clinton's presidency.

Following her defeat, she practiced law with Margy White, Karpan's former deputy secretary of state. In 1995, Karpan was appointed to serve as interim Laramie County attorney to replace Roberta Coates, who resigned. In the same year, she also taught a course on state government at Laramie County Community College, and in spring 1996, she taught political science classes at the University of Wyoming as the Milward Simpson fellow.

In 1996, a poll paid for by the Democratic Senatorial Campaign Committee showed Karpan leading John Barrasso, Dan Sullivan, and Eli Bebout in that year's United States Senate election. The poll also showed that she had name recognition among 92 percent of people and was viewed by 81 percent of people as an effective public servant. On April 3, Karpan informally announced that she would seek the Democratic nomination for the Senate seat held by retiring Republican Senator Alan Simpson. She formally announced her campaign on June 24. During the campaign, Senate Minority Leader Tom Daschle and Senator Bob Kerrey campaigned for Karpan. She won the Democratic nomination against Mickey Kalinay. During the general election, The New York Times remarked that Karpan was "running a surprisingly strong race", despite the state's Republican-leaning electorate. She espoused conservative positions, including fiscal responsibility and a smaller role for the federal government. She and her opponent, Republican Mike Enzi, both received an A rating from the NRA Political Victory Fund (NRA-PVF), indicating a strong record of supporting gun rights and the Second Amendment. Karpan found the NRA's endorsement to be "very heartening". She battled Republican efforts to label her as a "national Democrat" or "Clinton Democrat", instead referring to herself as a "Wyoming Democrat". However, she supported abortion rights, a liberal position. Karpan ultimately lost to Enzi, who successfully associated Karpan with Clinton and gained votes from supporters of Bob Dole during that year's presidential election. Karpan raised $927,949 in contributions and ended the campaign with a balance of $24,919. Enzi had raised $911,153 and ended his campaign with a balance of $121,587 in cash and $29,000 in debt.

== United States Department of the Interior ==
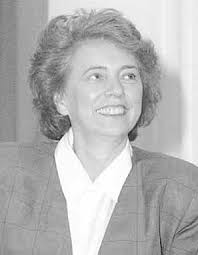
Kathy Karpan in 1998

On May 6, 1997, Clinton, who had won reelection, selected Karpan to serve as director of the Office of Surface Mining Reclamation and Enforcement. The United States Senate confirmed her by a unanimous vote on July 31. Karpan took office on August 4, 1997, becoming the first woman to hold that position. In this role, Karpan considered regulations on mountaintop removal mining in eastern US coal mines, and continued a "Clean Streams Program" in abandoned mine lands. Her office's work on mine reclamation brought her full circle to her first job with Roncalio, who had sponsored the legislation that authorized the office to fund reclamation efforts from taxes on current coal production.

Environmentalists accused Karpan of being too close to the mining industry. On March 15, 2000, Karpan recused herself as director and took several weeks of vacation time, while she applied to a job as head of the National Mining Association, a lobbying group for the mining industry. As her office regulated mining, environmentalists and journalists raised ethical concerns about a potential conflict of interest. On April 10, 2000, unsure of whether she would actually get the job, Karpan stepped down as director and became acting principal deputy assistant secretary for land and minerals management. In her new role, she oversaw non-mining issues that involved the Bureau of Land Management and the Minerals Management Service.

== Later life and death ==
As Clinton's presidency came to an end, Karpan considered applying for jobs in private business or non-governmental organizations. She indicated that she did not plan to return to political life. After the inauguration of George W. Bush as president in January 2001, Karpan returned to her law practice in Cheyenne. The law office opened as Bagley, Karpan, Rose and White in November 2001. In 2007, the law firm dissolved under its former name and became Karpan and White, P.C.

During the 2002 Wyoming gubernatorial election, Karpan endorsed Paul Hickey for the Democratic nomination. She supported Hillary Clinton during the 2008 Wyoming Democratic presidential caucuses and served as a Clinton delegate at the party's national convention. During the 2010 Wyoming gubernatorial election, Karpan served as co-chair of Leslie Peterson's gubernatorial campaign alongside Joe Evans. She again supported Clinton during the 2016 Democratic presidential primaries. In the same year, Karpan served as the state chair of Ryan Greene's House of Representatives campaign.

Karpan died in Cheyenne on October 24, 2025, at the age of 83 after having cancer for months.

== Electoral history ==
1986 Wyoming Secretary of State election
Party	Candidate	Votes	%
Democratic	Kathy Karpan	86,449	53.59%
Republican	K. C. Thomson	74,880	46.41%
Total votes		161,329	100.00%

1990 Wyoming Secretary of State election
Party	Candidate	Votes	%
Democratic	Kathy Karpan (incumbent)	100,676	64.30%
Republican	Tom Zollinger	55,893	35.70%
Total votes		156,569	100.00%

1994 Wyoming gubernatorial election
Party	Candidate	Votes	%
Republican	Jim Geringer	118,016	58.72%
Democratic	Kathy Karpan	80,747	40.17%
Libertarian	Seaghan Uibreaslain	2,227	1.11%
Total votes		200,990	100.00%

1996 Wyoming United States Senate election
Primary election
Party	Candidate	Votes	%
Democratic	Kathy Karpan	32,419	86.07%
Democratic	Mickey Kalinay	5,245	13.93%
Total votes		37,664	100.00%
General election
Republican	Mike Enzi	114,116	54.06%
Democratic	Kathy Karpan	89,103	42.21%
Libertarian	David Herbert	5,289	2.51%
Natural Law	Lloyd Marsden	2,569	1.22%
Total votes		211,077	100.00%

Political offices
Preceded by Thyra Thomson	Secretary of State of Wyoming; 1987–1995	Succeeded by Diana Ohman
Party political offices
Preceded by Mike Sullivan	Democratic nominee for Governor of Wyoming; 1994	Succeeded by John Vinich
Preceded by Kathy Helling	Democratic nominee for U.S. Senator from Wyoming (Class 2); 1996	Succeeded by Joyce Corcoran
