= Eli Bebout =

American politician (born 1946)

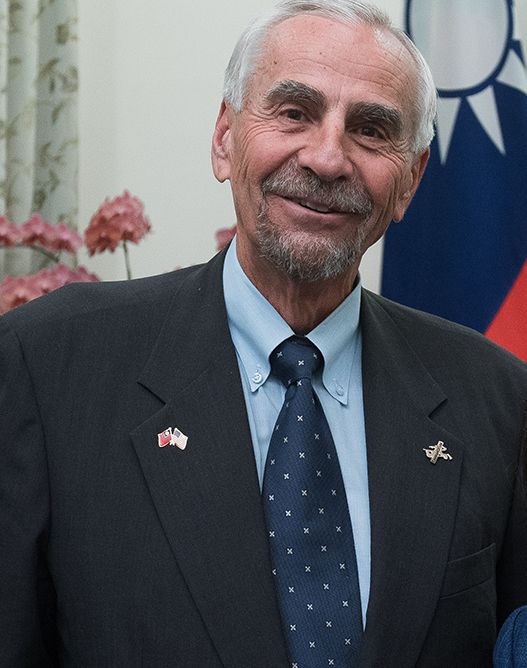

President of the Wyoming Senate
- In office January 10, 2017 – January 9, 2019
- Preceded by: Phil Nicholas
- Succeeded by: Drew Perkins

Majority Leader of the Wyoming Senate
- In office 2015–2017

Member of the Wyoming Senate from the 26th district
- In office April 17, 2007 – January 12, 2021
- Preceded by: Bob Peck
- Succeeded by: Tim Salazar

55th Speaker of the Wyoming House of Representatives
- In office 1999–2001
- Preceded by: Bruce A. Hinchey
- Succeeded by: Rick Tempest

Majority Leader of the Wyoming House of Representatives
- In office 1997–1999

Member of the Wyoming House of Representatives
- In office 1987–2001
- Preceded by: Multi-member district (Fremont County)
- Succeeded by: District abolished (Fremont County); David Miller (55th district)
- Constituency: Fremont County (1986–1993); 55th district (1993–2001)

Personal details
- Born: October 14, 1946 (age 79) Rawlins, Wyoming, U.S.
- Party: Democratic (Before 1994); Republican (1994–present)
- Spouse: Lorraine Tavares Bebout
- Children: 4
- Education: United States Air Force Academy (attended); University of Wyoming (BS)

Military service
- Allegiance: United States
- Branch/service: United States Air Force
- Unit: Air Force Reserve Command

Eli Daniel Bebout (born October 14, 1946) is an American athlete and politician who served in the Wyoming House of Representatives from a multi-member district in Fremont County and the 55th district from 1987 to 2001, and later served in the Wyoming Senate from the 26th district 2007 to 2021, as a member of the Democratic and Republican parties. He was the first person to serve as both Speaker of the Wyoming House of Representatives and President of the Wyoming Senate.

Bebout was born in Rawlins, Wyoming, and educated at Shoshoni High School, the United States Air Force Academy, and the University of Wyoming. He was honorably discharged from the United States Air Force Academy stating that he believed he had violated the honor code. Bebout became involved in the energy and pharmaceutical industries and gained a net worth of around $6 million.

Bebout entered politics with his successful write-in candidacy to the state house and was a member of the Democratic Party. During his tenure in the state house as a Democrat he was considered a possible candidate in multiple statewide elections, was selected to serve as Minority Whip, unsuccessfully sought the vice-chair position of the Wyoming Democratic Party, and his proposed redistricting plan was adopted. He switched to the Republican Party in 1994, and was given the position of Majority Leader and then Speaker.

Bebout left the state house in the 2000 election and unsuccessfully ran in the 2002 Wyoming gubernatorial election with the Republican nomination against Democratic nominee Dave Freudenthal. He was selected to replace Bob Peck in the state senate following Peck's death. During his tenure in the state senate he served as Vice President, Majority Leader, and President.

== Early life and education ==
Eli Daniel Bebout was born in Rawlins, Wyoming, on October 14, 1946, to Hubert Bebout, a former member of the Wyoming House of Representatives and mayor of Shoshoni, Wyoming. He graduated from Shoshoni High School and started attending the United States Air Force Academy after receiving an appointment in 1963. He was named to the Prep All-American Basketball team after a poll was conducted of coaches and sportswriters in the United States. He played at the 1969 Western Athletic Conference Championship for the University of Wyoming.

Bebout did not graduate from the United States Air Force Academy which he had attended from June 29, 1964 to February 28, 1967, but did graduate from the University of Wyoming. He was honorably discharged from the United States Air Force Academy and Bebout stated that he had voluntarily left the academy in 1967, due to him believing that he had violated the honor code after not reporting other cadets who had committed infractions. He served in the reserves until 1970, but did not serve in active duty.

In 1977, Bebout married Lorraine Tavares Bebout, with whom he had four children. Lorraine later convinced Bebout to join the Republican Party which she had been a member of. He and his wife later reported being worth around $6 million in the 2000s.

Bebout served as president of the Nuclear Power & Energy Company which performed explorations for uranium. He also founded Smith-Collins Pharmaceutical Incorporated in 1983. He was one of the organizers of the Yellowstone State Bank of Lander in 1979.

== Career ==
=== Wyoming House of Representatives ===
==== Elections ====
During the 1986 election Bebout was one of four people to file as a write-in candidate for one of five seats in the Wyoming House of Representatives from Fremont County. He placed fourth out of ten candidates after spending $7,138 during the campaign causing incumbent Republican Representative Bob Baker to not win reelection while the other four incumbents retained their seats. Bebout served as a member of the Democratic Party in the state house.

Representative Scott Ratliff wanted either Bebout or Republican Representative Mary Odde to run in the 1988 state senate election to succeed Senator Frank Dusl, but Bebout chose to run for reelection. During the campaign he was endorsed by the AFL–CIO and placed first out of seven candidates.

Chuck Graves, the chair of the Wyoming Democratic Party, talked to Bebout about running for a seat in the United States Senate in the 1990 election against incumbent Republican Senator Alan Simpson, but Bebout announced on May 8, 1990, that he would not run in the election and would instead run for reelection to the state house. He won reelection in the 1990 election.

Graves listed Bebout as a possible candidate, alongside Secretary of State Kathy Karpan, for a seat in the United States House of Representatives in the 1992 election against incumbent Republican Representative Craig L. Thomas. Following the 1992 reapportionment of districts he was moved into the single-member 55th district with two other incumbent members of the state house. Bebout stated that he had considered joining the Republican Party, but that he would remain in the Democratic Party. Bebout filed to run for reelection as a Democrat and won in the general election after defeating Republican nominee Marlene Brodrick, who had been appointed to fill the remainder of Representative Odde's term.

On April 26, 1994, Bebout announced that he had changed his political party affiliation from the Democratic Party to the Republican Party, but stated that he would not run in a statewide election in 1994. Edward Lee, the chair of the Fremont County Democratic Party stated that resigning would be "the ethical thing for Mr. Bebout to do". He defeated Libertarian nominee Jim Blomquist in the 1994 election.

Bebout considered running to succeed Simpson in the United States Senate in the 1996 election, but chose not to and a poll conducted by the Democratic Senatorial Campaign Committee showed him losing to Karpan, a Democrat. He was reelected without opposition in the 1996 and 1998 elections. Bebout announced on April 28, 2000, that he would not run for reelection to the state house. Republican nominee David Miller defeated Democratic nominee Linda Bebout, who was no relation to Bebout, to succeed him in the state house.

==== Tenure ====
During Bebout's tenure in the state legislature he served on the Corporations, Revenue, and the Mines and Minerals committees. In 1992, Bebout was selected to serve as Minority Whip without opposition after representatives Don Sullivan and Bill Vasey, who instead became chair of the Democratic caucus, declined their nominations for the position.

After Bebout became a Republican he lost his position on the Appropriations committee to Representative Bill Bensell and his position as Minority Whip to Representative Wayne Morrow, but Speaker Doug Chamberlain, a Republican, appointed Bebout to serve on the Judiciary and Travel, Recreation and Wildlife committees. Bebout was selected by the Republican caucus to serve as Majority Leader in 1996. During the 1998 election Speaker Bruce Hinchey left the state house to run for a seat in the state senate. Bebout defeated representatives Harry Tipton and Carroll Miller to become Speaker while Rick Tempest was selected to serve as Majority Leader.

During the 1989 United States House of Representatives special election Roger McDaniel and Bebout served as Democratic nominee John Vinich's campaign coordinators. He attempted to become the vice-chair of the Wyoming Democratic Party in 1989, but was eliminated from contention after a man was selected to serve as chair due to party rules requiring the chair and vice-chair to be members of the opposite sex. Bebout served as a delegate to the Wyoming Republican Party's state conventions in 1998, 2000, and 2002.

Bebout was selected in 1997, to replace Larry Dickerson, a member of the Oklahoma Senate, as chair of The Energy Council becoming the first Wyoming legislator to serve as chair of the organization.

=== Gubernatorial campaign ===
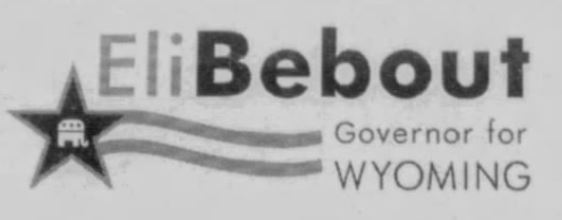
Bebout's gubernatorial campaign logo

Bebout stated that he was interested in running for governor in the 2002 election in 2000. An exploratory committee in support of a Bebout gubernatorial campaign was filed papers with the secretary of state on May 15, 2001, with Senator Bob Peck as the committee's chair. On January 8, 2002, Bebout announced that he had raised $102,000 to run for governor with $42,000 being from him, he would organize a campaign in twenty-three counties, and that Gale Geringer would be his campaign manager, but did not yet announce his campaign. He formally announced his gubernatorial campaign on April 9.

Bill Sniffin, one of Bebout's opponents, regarded Bebout as the leading candidate for the Republican nomination. Bebout raised more in the Republican primary than all three of his opponents combined. Representative Barbara Cubin denied having influenced the National Rifle Association to endorse Bebout. Bebout defeated Sniffin, Ray Hunkins, Stephen Watt, and John H. Self in the Republican primary. During the Republican primary he has raised $372,827 and spent $456,447.

Dave Dawson, the Libertarian gubernatorial nominee, claimed that the Petroleum Association of Wyoming excluded them from their forum as they wanted to protect Bebout who Dawson said that he would take votes from. Democratic nominee Dave Freudenthal defeated Bebout in the general election. During the campaign Bebout had raised $722,345 and spent $691,167 compared to Freudenthal's, who he had outraised and outfunded, $533,424 in fundraising and $512,099 in spending.

=== Wyoming Senate ===
==== Elections ====
Bebout was considered as a possible candidate to replace Peck in the state senate. Peck, who had served since 1991, died on March 6, 2007, creating a vacancy in the state senate with multiple people seeking and being speculated about as candidates for the seat including Peck's son Steve, Bebout, Representative Frank Philp, and former Representative Brodrick. Bebout was selected as one of three finalist candidates by Republican precinct members of the 26th district who would be voted on by the Fremont County Commission. Lois Herbst, who had unsuccessfully run for a seat in the state house from the 34th district, and Doug Thompson, a Fremont County commissioner, were the other two finalists and Thompson stated that he would not vote on the nomination. The four remaining members of the Fremont County Commission voted unanimously on April 3, to select Bebout to fill the vacancy.

Bebout ran for reelection in the 2008 election and won reelection without opposition. Bebout announced on April 19, 2012, that he would seek reelection and faced no opposition in the election. He defeated Democratic nominee Chesie Lee in the 2016 election. He announced on March 13, 2020, that he would not seek reelection in the 2020 election.

==== Tenure ====
During Bebout's tenure in the state senate he served as chair of the Appropriations committee. He was selected to serve as vice-president of the Wyoming Senate in 2012. Bebout later served as Majority Leader starting in 2015. On November 19, 2016, Bebout was selected to serve as President of the Wyoming Senate by the Republican caucus becoming the first person to serve as both Speaker of the Wyoming House of Representatives and President of the Wyoming Senate. Senator Drew Perkins was selected by the Republican caucus to replace Bebout as president.

Bebout was considered a candidate for the 2008 United States Senate special election which was held following the death of Senator Thomas, but declined to run as he stated that he was committed to filling out the remainder of Peck's term. During the 2012 presidential election he and James Lee Anderson served as co-chairs of Mitt Romney's presidential campaign in Wyoming. Bebout, Diemer True, and Tony Ross served on Senator Mike Enzi's campaign finance committee during the 2014 United States Senate election.

== Political positions ==
Bebout supports seat belt laws and supported making all passengers in a vehicle wear one. Bebout stated that he was "totally in favor of the death penalty". Bebout sponsored legislation calling for the United States Congress to end the United States' participation in the United Nations.

=== Economic ===
In 1988, Bebout was an initial sponsor of legislation in the state house that would take out a loan that would cost $8.5 million a year in order to building a natural gas pipeline from California to Wyoming. In 1991, the state legislature voted forty-three to twenty-one, with Bebout being the only Democrat voting in favor, to override Governor Mike Sullivan's veto, which was the first successful veto override in Wyoming's history, of legislation giving an extension of tax breaks for wildcat oil wells. In 2016, the state senate voted twenty to ten, with Bebout against, against accepting the Medicaid expansion from the Affordable Care Act.

Bebout and Ratliff sponsored legislation in 1989, which called for a constitutional amendment to prohibit the implementation of a state income tax without it being voted on through a referendum. He opposed the creation of a state income tax.

=== Equality ===
The state house voted forty-four to twenty, with Bebout as one of the four Democrats voting against, against reconsidering legislation to create a holiday to honor Martin Luther King Jr. after the legislation failed in committee. Bebout supported legislation to declare all same-sex marriages, including those conducted outside of the state, void in Wyoming. He opposed the creation of hate crime laws.

=== Redistricting ===
Bebout proposed legislation in 1991, which would institute single-member districts for the state legislature. The Joint Corporations Committee voted nine to five to adopt an amended version of Bebout's legislation while rejecting other versions that only had single-member districts. The state house voted thirty-three to thirty, with Bebout against, against an amendment to increase the amount of districts in the reapportionment plan from sixty to sixty-two.

== Electoral history ==
Eli Bebout electoral history

1986 Wyoming House of Representatives Fremont County election
Party	Candidate	Votes	%
Democratic	Scott Ratliff (incumbent)	7,592	15.02%
Republican	Mary Odde (incumbent)	7,331	14.50%
Republican	Harry Tipton (incumbent)	6,780	13.41%
Democratic	Eli Bebout (write-in)	6,409	12.68%
Republican	Dennis Tippets (incumbent)	6,291	12.44%
Republican	Bob Baker (incumbent)	6,141	12.17%
Democratic	Will Murphy (write-in)	3,036	6.01%
Republican	Richard Emond	3,002	5.94%
Democratic	Jim Rutter (write-in)	2,443	4.83%
Democratic	Steve Gyorvary (write-in)	1,527	3.02%
Total votes		50,552	100.00%

1988 Wyoming House of Representatives Fremont County election
Party	Candidate	Votes	%
Democratic	Eli Bebout (incumbent)	8,636	17.17%
Democratic	Scott Ratliff (incumbent)	8,081	16.07%
Republican	Mary Odde (incumbent)	7,991	15.89%
Republican	Harry Tipton (incumbent)	7,820	15.55%
Republican	Dennis Tippets (incumbent)	7,491	14.90%
Republican	Alan O'Hashi	5,352	10.64%
Republican	Larry E. Hastings	4,914	9.77%
Total votes		50,285	100.00%

1992 Wyoming House of Representatives 55th district election
Primary election
Party	Candidate	Votes	%
Democratic	Eli Bebout (incumbent)	650	100.00%
Total votes		650	100.00%
General election
Democratic	Eli Bebout (incumbent)	1,955	61.69%
Republican	Marlene Brodrick (incumbent)	1,214	38.31%
Total votes		3,169	100.00%

1994 Wyoming House of Representatives 55th district election
Party	Candidate	Votes	%
Republican	Eli Bebout (incumbent)	2,708	83.35%
Libertarian	Jim Blomquist	541	16.65%
Total votes		3,249	100.00%

1996 Wyoming House of Representatives 55th district election
Primary election
Party	Candidate	Votes	%
Republican	Eli Bebout (incumbent)	1,409	100.00%
Total votes		1,409	100.00%
General election
Republican	Eli Bebout (incumbent)	2,796	100.00%
Total votes		2,796	100.00%

1998 Wyoming House of Representatives 55th district election
Primary election
Party	Candidate	Votes	%
Republican	Eli Bebout (incumbent)	1,347	100.00%
Total votes		1,347	100.00%
General election
Republican	Eli Bebout (incumbent)	2,409	100.00%
Total votes		2,409	100.00%

2002 Wyoming gubernatorial election
Primary election
Party	Candidate	Votes	%
Republican	Eli Bebout	44,417	48.98%
Republican	Ray Hunkins	25,363	27.97%
Republican	Bill Sniffin	13,633	15.03%
Republican	Stephen Watt	5,724	6.31%
Republican	John H. Self	1,548	1.71%
Total votes		90,685	100.00%
General election
Democratic	Dave Freudenthal	92,662	49.96%
Republican	Eli Bebout	88,873	47.92%
Libertarian	Dave Dawson	3,924	2.12%
Total votes		185,459	100.00%

2008 Wyoming Senate 26th district election
Primary election
Party	Candidate	Votes	%
Republican	Eli Bebout (incumbent)	2,979	100.00%
Total votes		2,979	100.00%
General election
Republican	Eli Bebout (incumbent)	7,043	98.37%
Write-in		117	1.63%
Total votes		7,160	100.00%
	Overvotes	2	
	Overvotes	1,082	

2012 Wyoming Senate 26th district election
Primary election
Party	Candidate	Votes	%
Republican	Eli Bebout (incumbent)	3,053	99.19%
Write-in		25	0.81%
Total votes		3,078	100.00%
	Overvotes	1	
	Overvotes	266	
General election
Republican	Eli Bebout (incumbent)	7,457	98.33%
Write-in		127	1.67%
Total votes		7,584	100.00%
	Overvotes	1	
	Overvotes	998	

2016 Wyoming Senate 26th district election
Primary election
Party	Candidate	Votes	%
Republican	Eli Bebout (incumbent)	3,014	97.92%
Write-in		64	2.08%
Total votes		3,078	100.00%
	Overvotes	448	
General election
Republican	Eli Bebout (incumbent)	6,461	76.14%
Democratic	Chesie Lee	1,979	23.32%
Write-in		46	0.54%
Total votes		8,486	100.00%
	Overvotes	1	
	Overvotes	269	

== See also ==
- List of American politicians who switched parties in office

Political offices
Preceded by Bruce Hinchey	Speaker of the Wyoming House of Representatives; 1999–2001	Succeeded by Rick Tempest
Preceded by Phil Nicholas	President of the Wyoming Senate; 2017–2019	Succeeded by Drew Perkins
Party political offices
Preceded by Jim Geringer	Republican nominee for Governor of Wyoming; 2002	Succeeded by Ray Hunkins
