= 1910 Wyoming gubernatorial election =

- November 8, 1910
- Turnout: 25.98% of Total Population ▼3.31
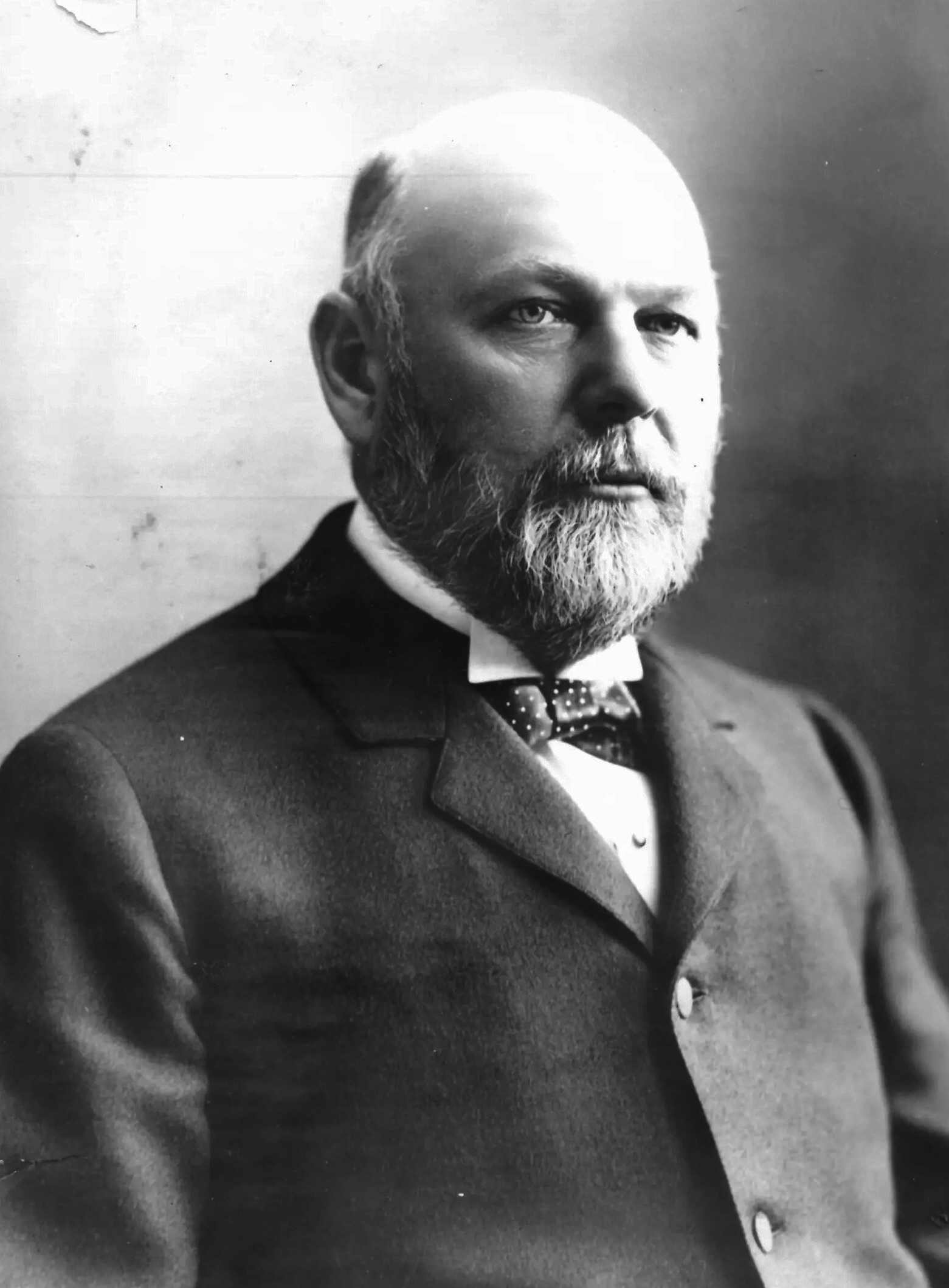

Nominee	Joseph M. Carey	William E. Mullen
Party	Democratic	Republican
Popular vote	21,086	15,235
Percentage	55.60%	40.17%
- County results Carey: 40–50% 50–60% 60–70% 70–80%
Governor before election
Bryant B. Brooks
Republican
Elected Governor
Joseph M. Carey
Democratic

The 1910 Wyoming gubernatorial election was held on November 8, 1910. Incumbent Republican Governor Bryant B. Brooks declined to seek re-election. The leading Republican candidates to succeed him were initially former U.S. Senator Joseph M. Carey and Attorney General William E. Mullen. However, shortly before the Republican convention, Carey announced he would instead run as an independent candidate. Shortly thereafter, Mullen was formally nominated by the Republican Party. A week later, at the Democratic convention, Carey was named as the Democratic nominee for governor. In the general election matchup between Carey and Mullen, Carey won a sizable victory, winning every county in the state, a feat that no other Democratic nominee would accomplish until Dave Freudenthal in 2006.

== Party conventions ==
In the summer of 1910, former U.S. Senator Joseph M. Carey announced that he would run for governor as a Republican. At the time, he denied any interest in running as an independent candidate if he lost the Republican nomination, affirming that he would only run as a Republican. State Attorney General William E. Mullen announced his campaign shortly thereafter, and called for the repeal of state legislation that limited the sale of alcohol outside of incorporated towns and cities.

Prior to the start of the Republican convention, Carey announced that he would instead run as an independent candidate, condemning the "republican state ring" that he alleged had run the state university and penitentiary system for political ends, committed financial fraud with the state's accounts, and had corrupted the state legislature. He called for the enactment of a direct primary law, eliminating the convention method of candidate nomination; the direct election of U.S. senators; and a corrupt practices act. At the Republican convention on September 15, 1910, State Senator Patrick Sullivan was unanimously offered the nomination for governor, but ultimately declined it, enabling Mullen to instead be named as the nominee.

Subsequently, at the Democratic convention that began on September 20, Carey announced that he would be a candidate for the nomination, facing W. L. Kuykendall. Carey was seen as the frontrunner for the nomination, with a high-level Democrat in the state party noting, "We can swallow Carey if Carey will swallow us" and adopt the state party's platform. Carey was ultimately nominated unanimously, and pledged to financially support the entire state ticket.

== General election ==
=== Results ===
1910 Wyoming gubernatorial election
Party	Candidate	Votes	%	±%
Democratic	Joseph M. Carey	21,086	55.60%	+20.75
Republican	William E. Mullen	15,235	40.17%	−20.03%
Socialist	W. W. Paterson	1,605	4.23%	−0.33%
Majority		5,851	15.43%	−9.93%
Turnout		37,926	100.00%	
Democratic gain from Republican				

=== Results by county ===
County	Carey	Votes	Mullen	Votes	Paterson	Votes
Uinta	49.40%	2,197	42.21%	1,877	8.39%	373
Park	50.37%	814	47.65%	770	1.98%	32
Big Horn	52.17%	1,563	46.26%	1,386	1.57%	47
Fremont	71.26%	2,130	26.87%	803	1.87%	56
Sweetwater	50.18%	1,095	36.85%	804	12.97%	283
Sheridan	60.17%	2,269	34.98%	1,319	4.85%	183
Johnson	60.60%	832	37.73%	518	1.68%	23
Natrona	61.19%	749	36.36%	445	2.45%	30
Carbon	50.45%	1,401	43.54%	1,209	6.01%	167
Crook	47.52%	1,007	47.33%	1,003	5.14%	109
Weston	49.82%	711	48.07%	686	2.10%	30
Converse	56.82%	1,196	42.19%	888	1.00%	21
Albany	55.12%	1,497	38.92%	1,057	5.96%	162
Laramie	58.64%	3,625	39.95%	2,470	1.41%	87
