= Senator McDaniel =

Senator McDaniel may refer to:

- Chris McDaniel (born 1972), Mississippi State Senate
- Christian McDaniel (born 1977), Kentucky State Senate
- Henry Dickerson McDaniel (1836–1926), Georgia
- Rodger McDaniel (born 1948), Wyoming State Senate
- William McDaniel (politician) (1801–1866), Missouri State Senate
