= David Miller (Wyoming politician) =

American politician (born 1953)

Majority Leader of the Wyoming House of Representatives
- In office January 10, 2017 – January 8, 2019
- Preceded by: Rosie Berger
- Succeeded by: Eric Barlow

Member of the Wyoming House of Representatives from the 55th district
- In office January 9, 2001 – January 4, 2021
- Preceded by: Eli Bebout
- Succeeded by: Ember Oakley

Personal details
- Born: January 29, 1953 (age 73) Chillicothe, Missouri, U.S.
- Party: Republican
- Education: University of Missouri (BS)

David R. Miller (born 29 January 1953) is an American politician and former Wyoming state legislator. He was born in Chillicothe, Missouri. A member of the Republican Party, Miller represented the 55th district in the Wyoming House of Representatives from 2001 to 2021.

== Elections ==
In 2012 Miller was unopposed in the August 21, 2012 Republican primary, winning with 1,321 votes, and won the three-way November 6, 2012 general election with 2,374 votes (56.1%) against Democratic nominee Sherry Shelley and Libertarian candidate Bethany Baldes.

Miller ran for the District 55 seat in 2000 when Republican representative Eli Bebout left prior to his 2002 run for Governor of Wyoming. Miller was unopposed in the August 22, 2000 Republican primary, winning with 1,247 votes, and won the November 7, 2000 general election with 1,943 votes (59.7%) against Democratic nominee Linda Bebout.

In 2002 Miller was unopposed in both the August 20, 2002 Republican primary, winning with 1,837 votes, and the November 5, 2002 general election, winning with 2,745 votes.

In 2004 Miller was unopposed in both the August 17, 2004 Republican primary, winning with 1,542 votes, and the November 2, 2004 general election, winning with 3,273 votes.

In 2006 Miller was unopposed in the August 22, 2006 Republican primary, winning with 1,250 votes. Harshman won the November 7, 2006 general election with 2,459 votes.

In 2008 Miller won the three-way August 19, 2008 Republican primary with 826 votes (54.5%), and was unopposed for the November 4, 2008 general election, winning with 3,218 votes.

In 2010 Miller was unopposed for both the August 17, 2010 Republican primary, winning with 1,592 votes, and the November 2, 2010 general election, winning with 2,700 votes.

Wyoming House of Representatives
Preceded by Rosie Berger	Majority Leader of the Wyoming House of Representatives; 2017–2019	Succeeded by Eric Barlow
