= 1988 United States Senate election in Wyoming =

- November 8, 1988
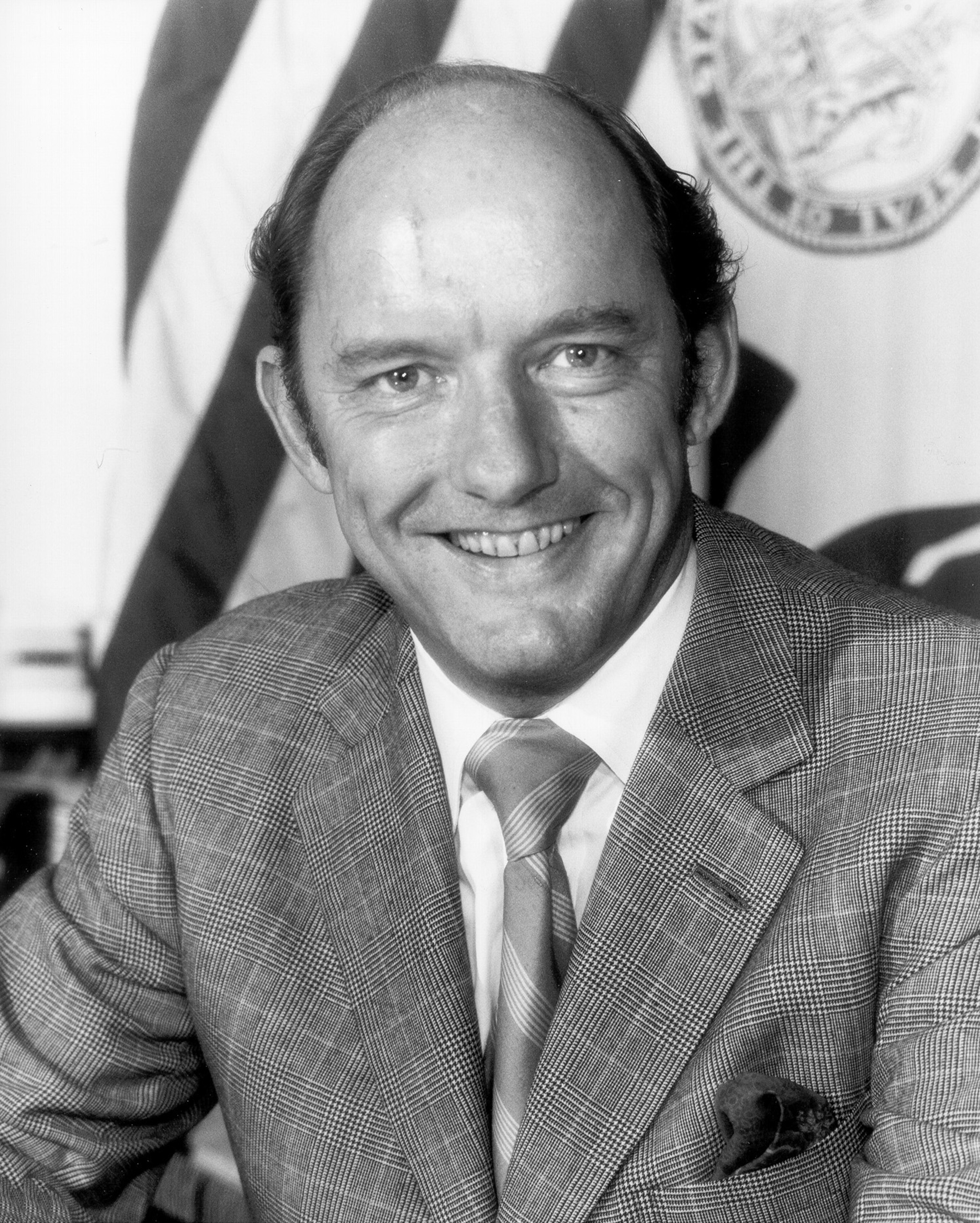

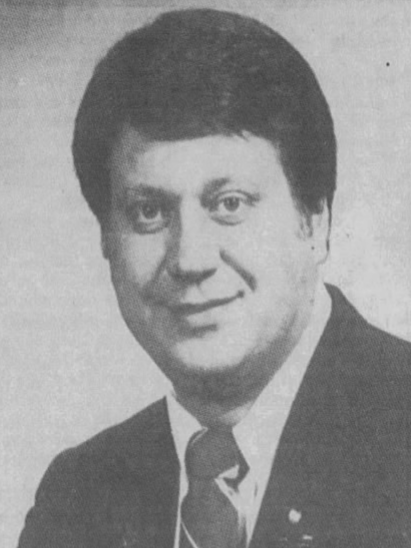
Nominee	Malcolm Wallop	John Vinich
Party	Republican	Democratic
Popular vote	91,143	89,821
Percentage	50.37%	49.63%
- County results Wallop: 50–60% 60–70% 70–80% Vinich: 50–60% 60–70%
U.S. senator before election
Malcolm Wallop
Republican
Elected U.S. Senator
Malcolm Wallop
Republican

The 1988 United States Senate election in Wyoming was held on November 8, 1988. Incumbent Republican Senator Malcolm Wallop ran for re-election to a third term. He was opposed by Democratic State Senator John Vinich in the general election. Despite Wallop's past strong performances in 1976 and 1982, and the overwhelming Republican majority in Wyoming in the presidential election, Wallop faced a surprisingly competitive race. He ended up defeating Vinich by less than 1%, by a margin of just 1,322 votes. To date, this remains the strongest performance by a Democratic U.S. Senate nominee in Wyoming since 1970, the last time a Democrat won a Senate election in the state. This is also the closest U.S. Senate race in Wyoming history.

== Democratic primary ==
=== Candidates ===
- John Vinich, State Senator
- Pete Maxfield, former Dean of the University of Wyoming School of Law
- Lynn Simons, Wyoming Superintendent of Instruction

=== Results ===
Democratic primary
Party	Candidate	Votes	%
Democratic	John Vinich	23,214	47.20%
Democratic	Pete Maxfield	14,613	29.72%
Democratic	Lynn Simons	11,350	23.08%
Total votes		49,177	100.00%

== Republican primary ==
=== Candidates ===
- Malcolm Wallop, incumbent U.S. Senator
- Nora Marie Lewis, farmer
- Bud Kinney, perennial candidate
- Michael J. Dee, perennial candidate, marijuana legalization advocate
- Russ Hanrahan, retired air traffic controller

=== Results ===
Republican primary
Party	Candidate	Votes	%
Republican	Malcolm Wallop (incumbent)	55,752	83.21%
Republican	Nora Marie Lewis	3,933	5.87%
Republican	Bud Kinney	3,716	5.55%
Republican	Michael J. Dee	1,898	2.83%
Republican	Russ Hanrahan	1,702	2.54%
Total votes		67,001	100.00%

== General election ==
=== Results ===
1988 United States Senate election in Wyoming
Party	Candidate	Votes	%	±%
Republican	Malcolm Wallop (incumbent)	91,143	50.37%	−6.29%
Democratic	John Vinich	89,821	49.63%	+6.29%
Majority		1,322	0.73%	−12.58%
Turnout		180,964		
Republican hold				
