= 2006 Wyoming gubernatorial election =

- November 7, 2006
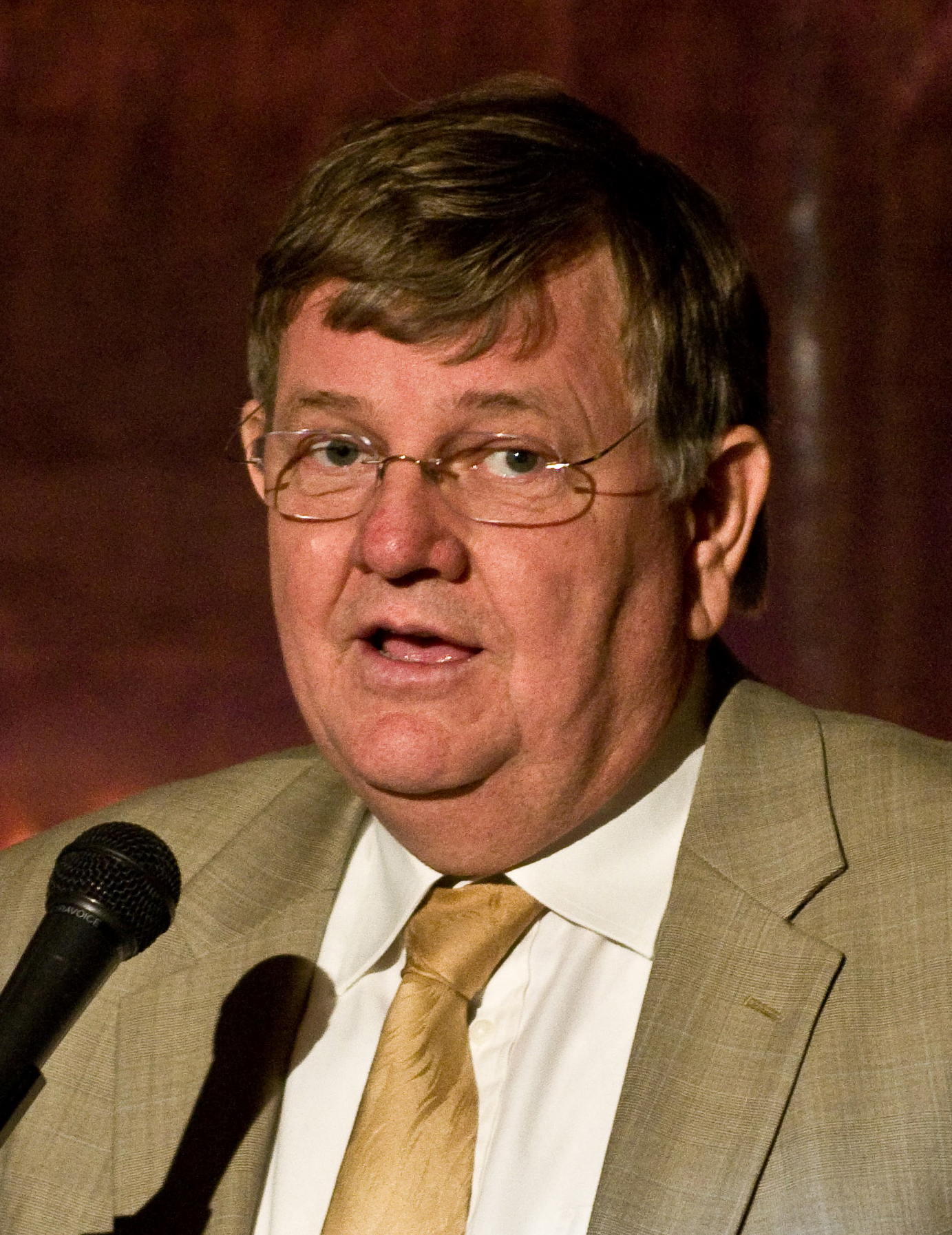

Nominee	Dave Freudenthal	Ray Hunkins
Party	Democratic	Republican
Popular vote	135,516	58,100
Percentage	69.99%	30.01%
- Freudenthal: 50–60% 60–70% 70–80% 80–90% >90% Hunkins: 50–60% 60–70% 70–80% Tie: 50% No votes
Governor before election
Dave Freudenthal
Democratic
Elected Governor
Dave Freudenthal
Democratic

The 2006 Wyoming gubernatorial election took place on November 7, 2006. Incumbent Democratic Governor Dave Freudenthal won re-election in a landslide over Republican Ray Hunkins, becoming the first Democrat since 1910 to win every county in the state. To date, this was the last time a Democrat was elected to statewide office in Wyoming, the last time a Democrat carried every county in the state, the last gubernatorial election in which a Democrat received more than 30% of the vote, and the last statewide election in which a Democrat won any county besides Teton, Albany, Laramie, or Sweetwater.

== Democratic primary ==
=== Candidates ===
- Dave Freudenthal, incumbent governor of Wyoming
- Al Hamburg, perennial candidate

=== Results ===
Democratic primary results
Party	Candidate	Votes	%
Democratic	Dave Freudenthal (incumbent)	26,550	89.66
Democratic	Al Hamburg	3,062	10.34
Total votes		29,612	100.00

== Republican primary ==
=== Candidates ===
- Ray Hunkins, attorney and rancher
- John H. Self

=== Results ===
Republican primary results
Party	Candidate	Votes	%
Republican	Ray Hunkins	51,803	74.64
Republican	John H. Self	17,598	25.36
Total votes		69,401	100.00

== General election ==
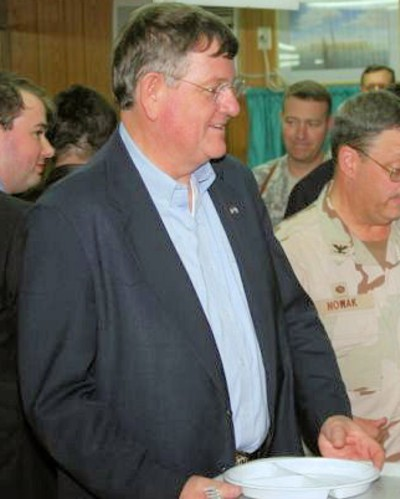
Governor Freudenthal casts his ballot.

=== Predictions ===
Source	Ranking	As of
The Cook Political Report	Solid D	November 6, 2006
Sabato's Crystal Ball	Safe D	November 6, 2006
Rothenberg Political Report	Safe D	November 2, 2006
Real Clear Politics	Safe D	November 6, 2006

=== Polling ===
Source	Date	Dave Freudenthal (D)	Ray Hunkins (R)
Rasmussen	July 20, 2006	58%	29%
Rasmussen	May 8, 2006	52%	29%

=== Results ===
Wyoming gubernatorial election, 2006
Party	Candidate	Votes	%	±%
Democratic	Dave Freudenthal (incumbent)	135,516	69.99%	+20.03%
Republican	Ray Hunkins	58,100	30.01%	−17.91%
Total votes		193,616	100.00%	
Democratic hold				

==== By county ====
County	Dave Freudenthal Democratic		Ray Hunkins Republican		Margin		Total
County	#	%	#	%	#	%	Total
Albany	9,472	79.62%	2,425	20.38%	7,047	59.23%	11,897
Big Horn	2,860	62.79%	1,695	37.21%	1,165	25.58%	4,555
Campbell	6,926	63.48%	3,985	36.52%	2,941	26.95%	10,911
Carbon	3,803	66.44%	1,921	33.56%	1,882	32.88%	5,724
Converse	3,307	65.32%	1,756	34.68%	1,551	30.63%	5,063
Crook	1,694	58.39%	1,207	41.61%	487	16.79%	2,901
Fremont	9,523	69.16%	4,246	30.84%	5,277	38.33%	13,769
Goshen	3,242	67.07%	1,592	32.93%	1,650	34.13%	4,834
Hot Springs	1,738	75.70%	558	24.30%	1,180	51.39%	2,296
Johnson	2,256	66.06%	1,159	33.94%	1,097	32.12%	3,415
Laramie	23,001	73.48%	8,300	26.52%	14,701	46.97%	31,301
Lincoln	3,348	54.29%	2,819	45.71%	529	8.58%	6,167
Natrona	18,894	73.92%	6,667	26.08%	12,227	47.83%	25,561
Niobrara	596	56.55%	458	43.45%	138	13.09%	1,054
Park	7,482	63.98%	4,212	36.02%	3,270	27.96%	11,694
Platte	2,607	65.68%	1,362	34.32%	1,245	31.37%	3,969
Sheridan	7,981	69.33%	3,530	30.67%	4,451	38.67%	11,511
Sublette	1,733	60.26%	1,143	39.74%	590	20.51%	2,876
Sweetwater	9,730	76.16%	3,045	23.84%	6,685	52.33%	12,775
Teton	7,247	80.73%	1,730	19.27%	5,517	61.46%	8,977
Uinta	3,959	63.08%	2,317	36.92%	1,642	26.16%	6,276
Washakie	2,482	72.42%	945	27.58%	1,537	44.85%	3,427
Weston	1,635	61.40%	1,028	38.60%	607	22.79%	2,663
Totals	135,516	69.99%	58,100	30.01%	77,416	39.98%	193,616

==== Counties that flipped from Republican to Democratic ====
- Big Horn (largest city: Lovell)
- Campbell (largest city: Gillette)
- Converse (largest city: Douglas)
- Crook (largest city: Sundance)
- Fremont (largest city: Riverton)
- Goshen (largest city: Torrington)
- Johnson (largest city: Buffalo)
- Lincoln (largest city: Kemmerer)
- Niobrara (largest city: Lusk)
- Park (largest city: Cody)
- Sheridan (largest city: Sheridan)
- Sublette (largest city: Pinedale)
- Uinta (largest city: Evanston)
- Washakie (largest city: Worland)
- Weston (largest city: Newcastle)

== See also ==
- 2006 United States gubernatorial elections
- 2006 United States Senate election in Wyoming
