= 1998 Wyoming gubernatorial election =

- November 3, 1998
- Turnout: 73.01% Registered ▼11.50% 38.56% of Total Population ▼5.75%
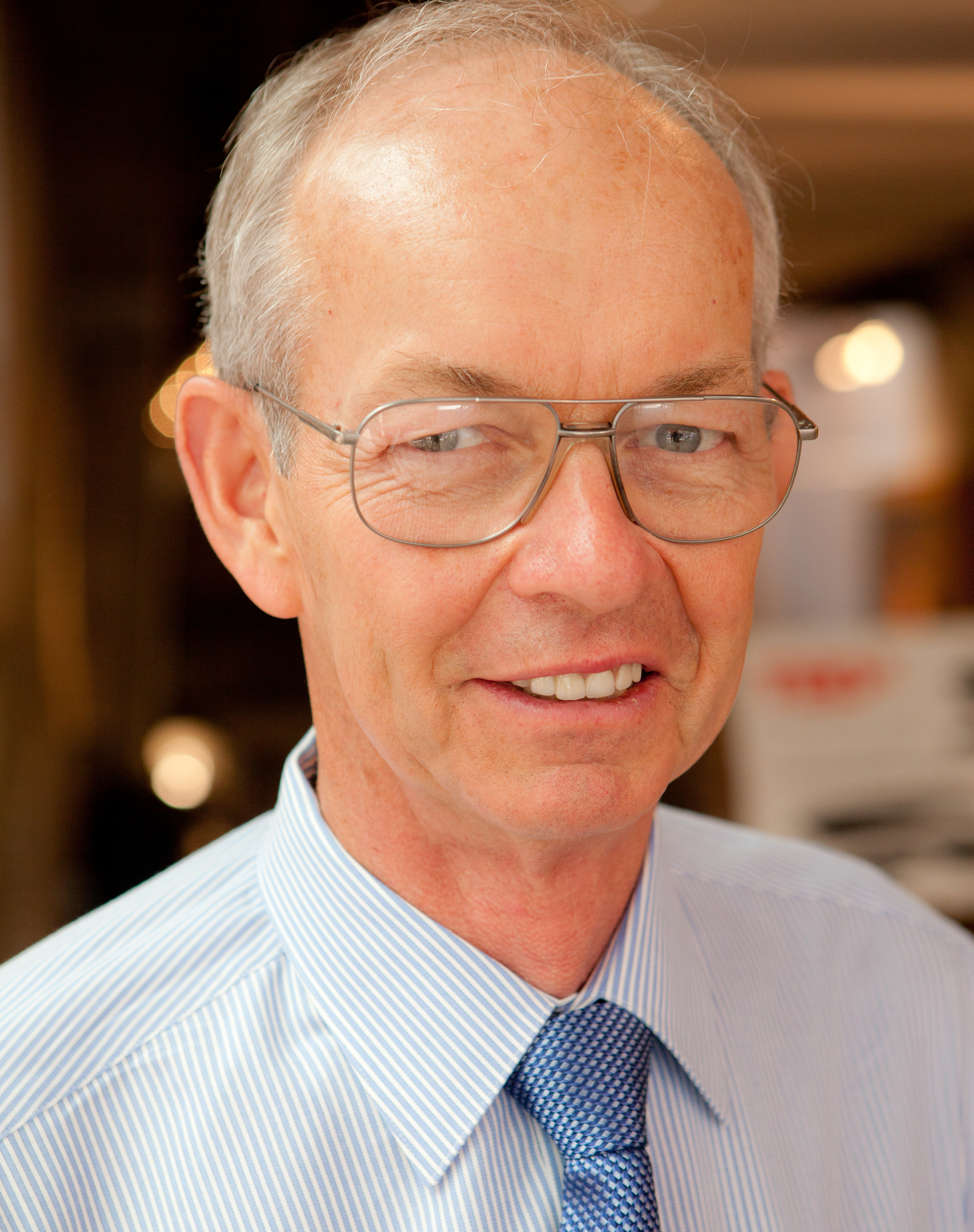

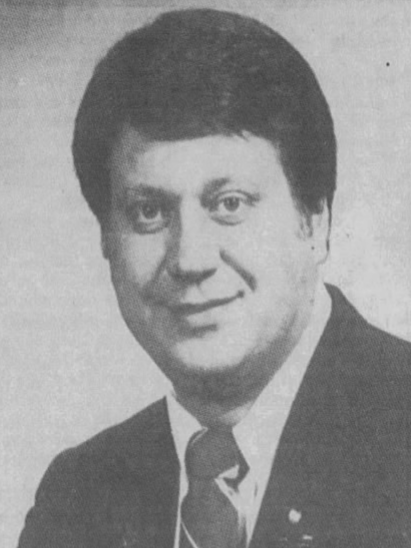
Nominee	Jim Geringer	John Vinich
Party	Republican	Democratic
Popular vote	97,235	70,754
Percentage	55.60%	40.46%
- County results Geringer: 40–50% 50–60% 60–70% 70–80% Vinich: 40–50% 50–60%
Governor before election
Jim Geringer
Republican
Elected Governor
Jim Geringer
Republican

The 1998 Wyoming gubernatorial election took place on November 3, 1998. Incumbent Republican Jim Geringer ran successfully for re-election to a second term as Governor of Wyoming, defeating Democratic nominee John Vinich.

== Republican primary ==
=== Candidates ===
- Jim Geringer, incumbent Governor
- Bill Taliaferro, rancher

Republican primary results
Party	Candidate	Votes	%
Republican	Jim Geringer (incumbent)	56,015	66.54
Republican	Bill Taliaferro	28,164	33.46
Total votes		84,179	100

== Democratic primary ==
=== Candidates ===
- Keith Goodenough, State Senator
- Phil Roberts, attorney and professor at the University of Wyoming
- John Vinich, State Senator

Democratic primary results
Party	Candidate	Votes	%
Democratic	John Vinich	18,054	53.89
Democratic	Keith Goodenough	9,033	26.96
Democratic	Phil Roberts	6,415	19.15
Total votes		29,002	100

== General Election ==
=== Debates ===
- Complete video of debate, October 28, 1998

== Results ==
1998 Wyoming gubernatorial election
Party	Candidate	Votes	%	±%
Republican	Jim Geringer (inc.)	97,235	55.60%	−3.12%
Democratic	John Vinich	70,754	40.46%	+0.28%
Libertarian	Dave Dawson	6,899	3.94%	+2.84%
Majority		26,481	15.14%	−3.40%
Turnout		174,888		
Republican hold				

=== By county ===
County	Jim Geringer Republican		John Vinich Democratic		Dave Dawson Libertarian		Margin		Total
County	#	%	#	%	#	%	#	%	Total
Albany	5,436	52.75%	4,527	43.93%	343	3.33%	909	8.82%	10,306
Big Horn	2,579	62.46%	1,379	33.40%	171	4.14%	1,200	29.06%	4,129
Campbell	5,536	65.33%	2,584	30.49%	354	4.18%	2,952	34.84%	8,474
Carbon	2,715	46.60%	2,856	49.02%	255	4.38%	−141	−2.42%	5,826
Converse	2,482	57.65%	1,634	37.96%	189	4.39%	848	19.70%	4,305
Crook	1,484	58.66%	914	36.13%	132	5.22%	570	22.53%	2,530
Fremont	6,822	49.10%	6,520	46.93%	551	3.97%	302	2.17%	13,893
Goshen	3,146	66.81%	1,448	30.75%	115	2.44%	1,698	36.06%	4,709
Hot Springs	1,158	53.49%	930	42.96%	77	3.56%	228	10.53%	2,165
Johnson	1,850	67.49%	798	29.11%	93	3.39%	1,052	38.38%	2,741
Laramie	15,227	54.58%	11,671	41.83%	1,000	3.58%	3,556	12.75%	27,898
Lincoln	3,704	66.53%	1,701	30.56%	162	2.91%	2,003	35.98%	5,567
Natrona	10,974	49.88%	9,862	44.83%	1,164	5.29%	1,112	5.05%	22,000
Niobrara	773	66.01%	336	28.69%	62	5.29%	437	37.32%	1,171
Park	7,255	70.93%	2,591	25.33%	383	3.74%	4,664	45.60%	10,229
Platte	2,635	65.16%	1,274	31.50%	135	3.34%	1,361	33.65%	4,044
Sheridan	5,248	52.32%	4,313	43.00%	469	4.68%	935	9.32%	10,030
Sublette	1,467	58.35%	918	36.52%	129	5.13%	549	21.84%	2,514
Sweetwater	4,925	37.85%	7,641	58.72%	447	3.44%	−2,716	−20.87%	13,013
Teton	4,342	61.88%	2,424	34.54%	251	3.58%	1,918	27.33%	7,017
Uinta	3,587	56.76%	2,521	39.89%	212	3.35%	1,066	16.87%	6,320
Washakie	2,237	66.54%	1,030	30.64%	95	2.83%	1,207	35.90%	3,362
Weston	1,653	62.50%	882	33.35%	110	4.16%	771	29.15%	2,645
Totals	97,235	55.60%	70,754	40.46%	6,899	3.94%	26,481	15.14%	174,888

Counties that flipped from Republican to Democratic

- Carbon
