= Wyoming's 55th House of Representatives district =

American legislative district

Wyoming's 55th State House of Representatives district
- Wyoming's 55th House of Representatives district as of 2022
Representative
Joel Guggenmos; R–Riverton
- Demographics: 74% White; 1% Black; 12% Hispanic; 1% Asian; 6% Native American; 6% Multiracial
- Population (2022): 10,076

Wyoming's 55th House of Representatives district is one of 62 districts in the Wyoming House of Representatives. The district encompasses part of Fremont County. It is represented by Republican Representative Joel Guggenmos of Riverton.

In 1992, the state of Wyoming switched from electing state legislators by county to a district-based system.

== List of members representing the district ==
Representative	Party	Term	Note
Eli Bebout	Republican (Note: Elected as a Democrat in 1992. Re-elected as a Republican in 1994 and thereafter.)	1993 – 2001	Elected in 1992. Re-elected in 1994. Re-elected in 1996. Re-elected in 1998.
David Miller	Republican	2001 – 2021	Elected in 2000. Re-elected in 2002. Re-elected in 2004. Re-elected in 2006. Re-elected in 2008. Re-elected in 2010. Re-elected in 2012. Re-elected in 2014. Re-elected in 2016. Re-elected in 2018.
Ember Oakley	Republican	2021 – 2025	Elected in 2020. Re-elected in 2022.
Joel Guggenmos	Republican	2025 – present	Elected in 2024.

== Recent election results ==
=== 2014 ===
House district 55 general election
Party	Candidate	Votes	%
Republican	David Miller (incumbent)	2,469	98.91%
Write-ins		27	1.08%
Total votes		2,496	100.0%
Invalid or blank votes		587	
Republican hold			

=== 2016 ===
House district 55 general election
Party	Candidate	Votes	%
Republican	David Miller (incumbent)	3,384	97.80%
Write-ins		76	2.19%
Total votes		3,460	100.0%
Invalid or blank votes		735	
Republican hold			

=== 2018 ===
House district 55 general election
Party	Candidate	Votes	%
Republican	David Miller (incumbent)	1,645	50.64%
Libertarian	Bethany Baldes	1,592	49.01%
Write-ins		11	0.33%
Total votes		3,248	100.0%
Invalid or blank votes		127	
Republican hold			

=== 2020 ===
House district 55 general election
Party	Candidate	Votes	%
Republican	Ember Oakley	2,058	50.21%
Libertarian	Bethany Baldes	2,026	49.43%
Write-ins		14	0.34%
Total votes		4,098	100.0%
Invalid or blank votes		143	
Republican hold			

=== 2022 ===
House district 55 general election
Party	Candidate	Votes	%
Republican	Ember Oakley (incumbent)	1,798	60.15%
Libertarian	Bethany Baldes	1,175	39.31%
Write-ins		16	0.53%
Total votes		2,989	100.0%
Invalid or blank votes		84	
Republican hold			

=== 2024 ===
House district 55 general election
Party	Candidate	Votes	%
Republican	Joel Guggenmos	2,858	88.73%
Write-ins		363	11.26%
Total votes		3,221	100.0%
Invalid or blank votes		667	
Republican hold			

== Historical district boundaries ==
Map	Description	Apportionment Plan	Notes
	Fremont County (part)	1992 Apportionment Plan	
	Fremont County (part)	2002 Apportionment Plan	
	Fremont County (part)	2012 Apportionment Plan	
