= Ember Oakley =

Wyoming politician

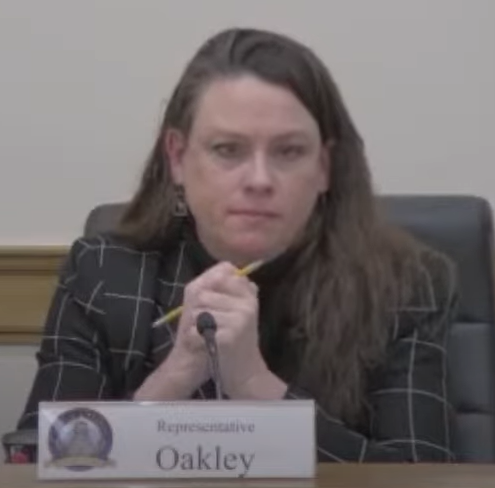
- Oakley in 2023

Member of the Wyoming House of Representatives from the 55th district
- In office January 4, 2021 – January 2025
- Preceded by: David Miller
- Succeeded by: Joel Guggenmos

Personal details
- Born: Rawlins, Wyoming, U.S.
- Party: Republican
- Education: Texas A&M University (BS); University of Wyoming (JD)
- Ember Oakley's voice Oakley speaks in a session of the House Revenue Committee; Recorded February 23, 2023

Ember Oakley is an American attorney and politician who served as a member of the Wyoming House of Representatives from the 55th district. Elected in November 2020, she assumed office on January 4, 2021.

== Early life and education ==
Oakley was born in Rawlins, Wyoming. She earned a Bachelor of Science degree in agribusiness from Texas A&M University and a Juris Doctor from the University of Wyoming College of Law.

== Career ==
Since 2011, Oakley has worked as a prosecutor for the Fremont County, Wyoming Attorney's Office. She was narrowly elected to the Wyoming House of Representatives in November 2020, defeating Libertarian candidate Bethany Baldes. She assumed office on January 4, 2021.

In her attempt at re-election, Oakley was defeated in the 2024 primary election.
