= 1994 Wyoming gubernatorial election =

- November 8, 1994
- Turnout: 84.51% Registered ▲4.52% 44.31% of Total Population ▲9.01%
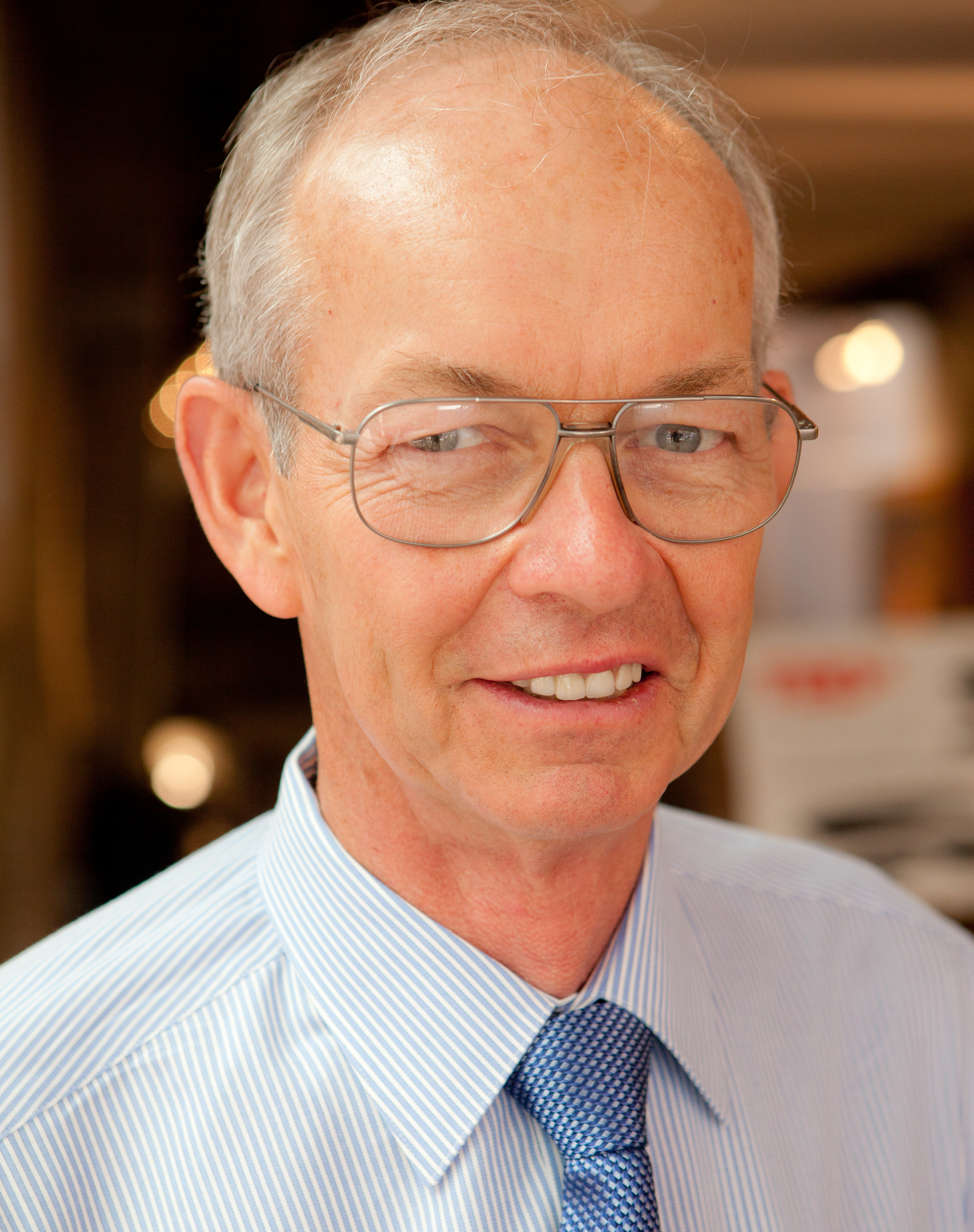

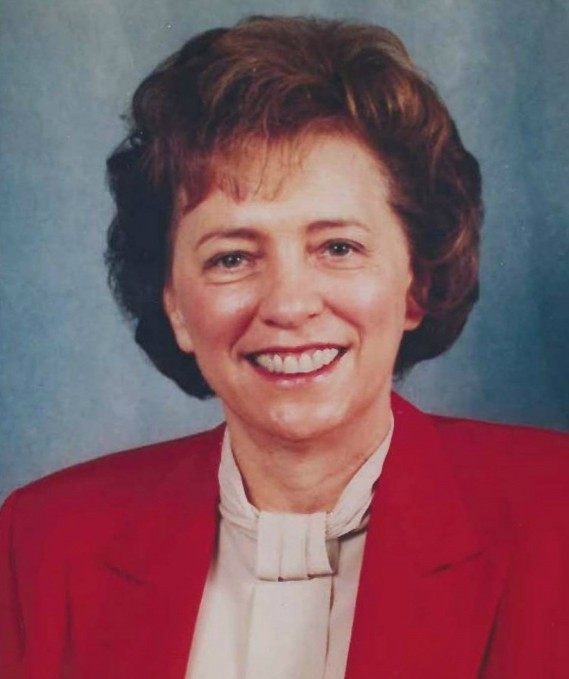
Nominee	Jim Geringer	Kathy Karpan
Party	Republican	Democratic
Popular vote	118,016	80,747
Percentage	58.72%	40.17%
- County results Geringer: 40–50% 50–60% 60–70% 70–80% Karpan: 50–60%
Governor before election
Mike Sullivan
Democratic
Elected Governor
Jim Geringer
Republican

The 1994 Wyoming gubernatorial election took place on November 8, 1994. Incumbent Democratic Governor Mike Sullivan was unable to seek a third term because of newly imposed term limits, and instead ran for the U.S. Senate. State Senate President Jim Geringer won the Republican primary and faced Secretary of State Kathy Karpan, the Democratic nominee, in the general election. Aided by the nationwide Republican wave, Geringer defeated Karpan in a landslide, marking the first time since Governor Stanley Hathaway's re-election in 1970 that a Republican won a gubernatorial election in Wyoming.

== Democratic primary ==
=== Candidates ===
==== Nominee ====
- Kathy Karpan, Wyoming secretary of state (1987–1995)

== Republican primary ==
=== Candidates ===
==== Nominee ====
- Jim Geringer, state senator

==== Eliminated in primary ====
- John Perry, former state senator
- Charles Scott, state senator
- Lloyd Baker, surveyor

Republican primary results
Party	Candidate	Votes	%
Republican	Jim Geringer	37,847	42.71%
Republican	John Perry	28,019	31.62%
Republican	Charles Scott	19,305	21.79%
Republican	Lloyd Baker	3,442	3.88%
Total votes		88,613	100.00

== Results ==
1994 Wyoming gubernatorial election
Party	Candidate	Votes	%	±%
Republican	Jim Geringer	104,638	58.72%	+24.07%
Democratic	Kathy Karpan	80,747	40.17%	−25.18%
Libertarian	Seaghan Uibreaslain	2,227	1.11%	−
Majority		37,269	18.54%	−12.17%
Turnout		200,990		
Republican gain from Democratic				
