= Marlene Brodrick =

Wyoming politician

Member of the Wyoming House of Representatives from the Fremont district

Marlene Brodrick is an American Democratic politician from Fremont County, Wyoming. She represented the Fremont district in the Wyoming House of Representatives in 1990.
