= 2002 Wyoming gubernatorial election =

- November 5, 2002
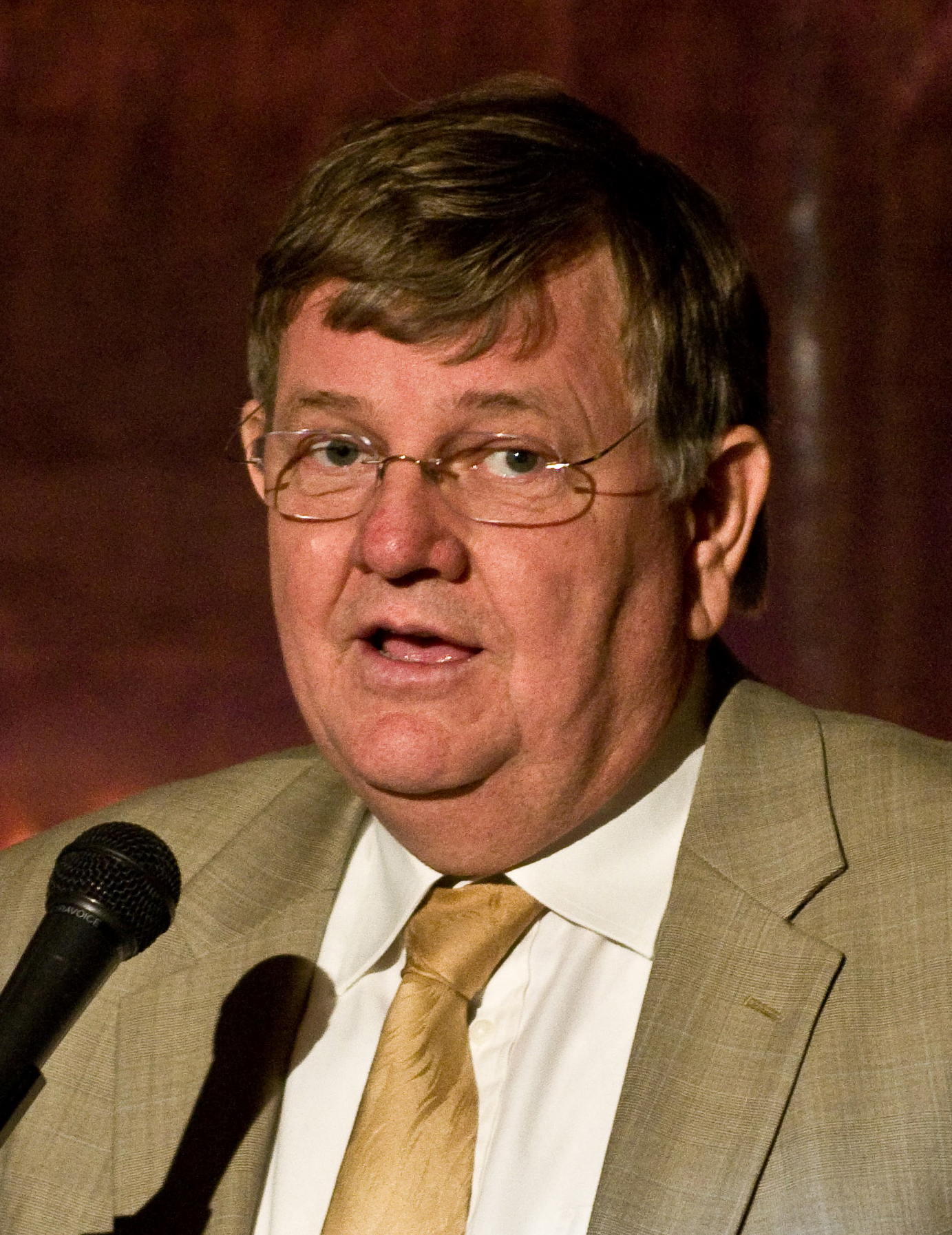

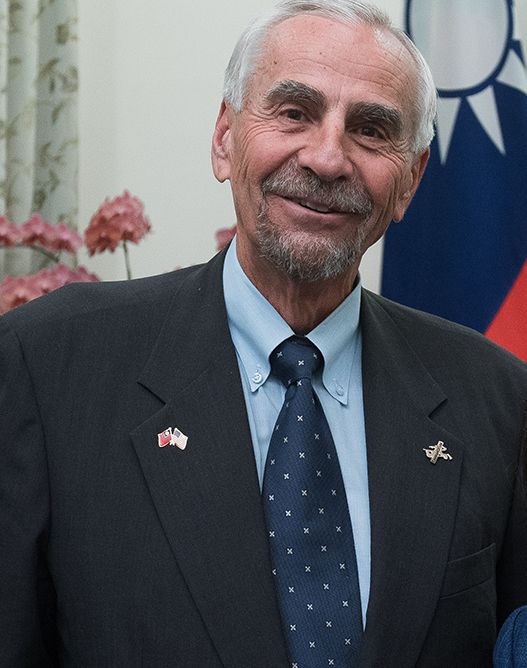
Nominee	Dave Freudenthal	Eli Bebout
Party	Democratic	Republican
Popular vote	92,662	88,873
Percentage	49.96%	47.92%
- County results Freudenthal: 50–60% 60–70% Bebout: 40–50% 50–60% 60–70%
Governor before election
Jim Geringer
Republican
Elected Governor
Dave Freudenthal
Democratic

The 2002 Wyoming gubernatorial election was held on November 5, 2002. Incumbent Republican Governor Jim Geringer was term-limited and unable to seek a third term in office, thereby creating an open seat. Former U.S. Attorney Dave Freudenthal and former Wyoming House Speaker Eli Bebout both emerged from competitive Democratic and Republican primaries, respectively, and faced off against each other in the general election. Despite Wyoming's strong inclination to elect Republicans, a contentious race ensued, with Freudenthal ultimately defeating Bebout by fewer than 4,000 votes. As of 2026, this is the last gubernatorial election in Wyoming to be decided by less than 30 percentage points.

== Democratic primary ==
=== Candidates ===
- Ken Casner
- Dave Freudenthal, former United States attorney for the District of Wyoming
- Paul Hickey, attorney, former chairman of the Wyoming Pipeline Authority and son of former Governor John J. Hickey
- Toby Simpson, construction worker

=== Results ===
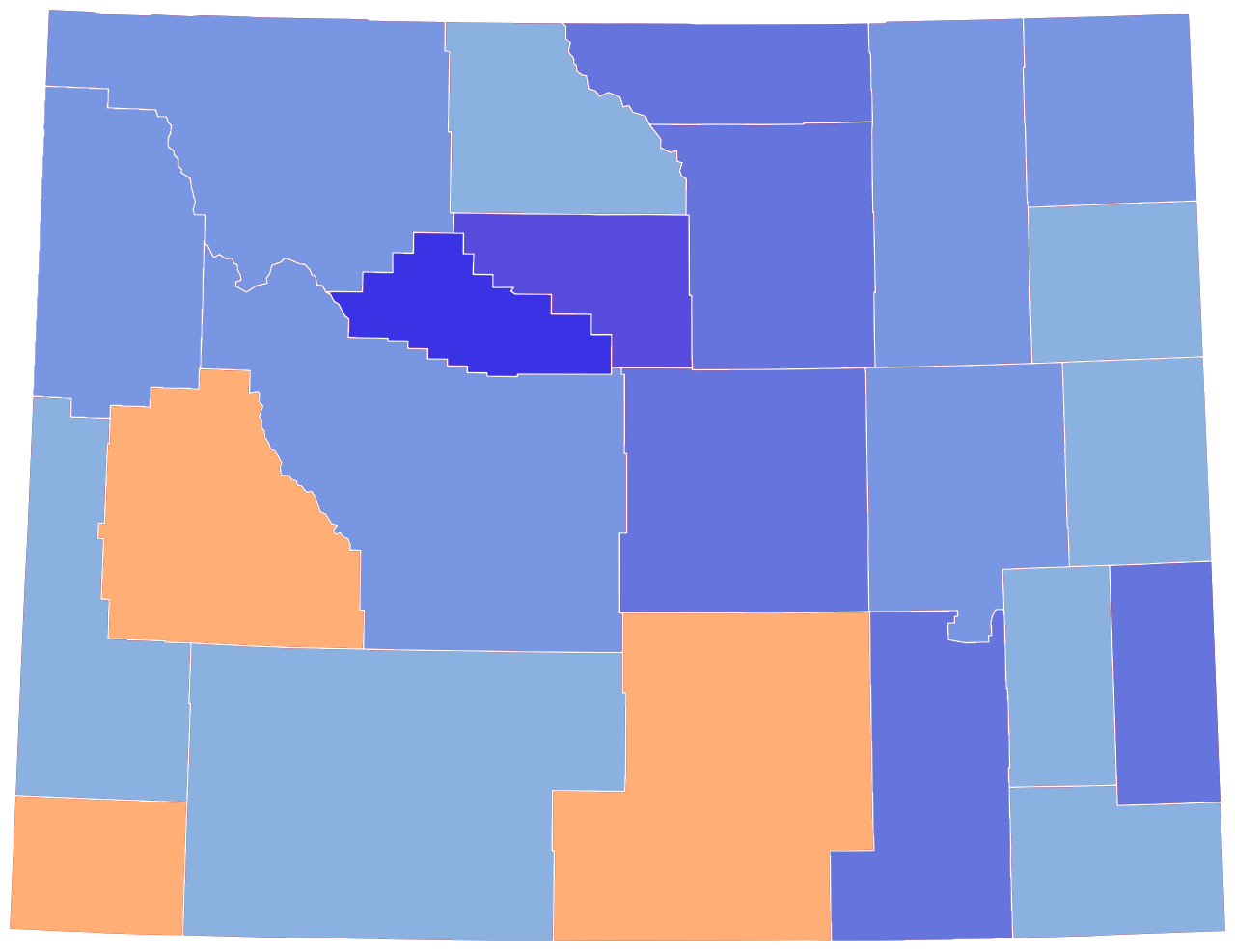
Results by county: Freudenthal: 40–50%; 50–60%; 60–70%; 70–80%; 80–90%; Hickey: 40–50%

Democratic primary results
Party	Candidate	Votes	%
Democratic	Dave Freudenthal	19,732	53.62
Democratic	Paul Hickey	13,793	37.48
Democratic	Toby Simpson	1,918	5.21
Democratic	Ken Casner	1,356	3.68
Total votes		36,799	100.00

== Republican primary ==
=== Candidates ===
- Eli Bebout, former speaker of the Wyoming House of Representatives
- Ray Hunkins, attorney and rancher
- John H. Self
- Bill Sniffin, journalist and former Wyoming travel commissioner
- Stephen Watt, state representative

=== Results ===
Republican primary results
Party	Candidate	Votes	%
Republican	Eli Bebout	44,417	48.98
Republican	Ray Hunkins	25,363	27.97
Republican	Bill Sniffin	13,633	15.03
Republican	Stephen Watt	5,724	6.31
Republican	John H. Self	1,548	1.71
Total votes		90,685	100.00

== General election ==
=== Predictions ===
Source	Ranking	As of
The Cook Political Report	Tossup	October 31, 2002
Sabato's Crystal Ball	Lean R	November 4, 2002

=== Results ===
Wyoming gubernatorial election, 2002
Party	Candidate	Votes	%	±%
Democratic	Dave Freudenthal	92,662	49.96%	+9.51%
Republican	Eli Bebout	88,873	47.92%	−7.68%
Libertarian	Dave Dawson	3,924	2.12%	−1.83%
Majority		3,789	2.04%	−13.10%
Turnout		185,459		
Democratic gain from Republican		Swing		

==== By county ====
County	Dave Freudenthal Democratic		Eli Bebout Republican		Dave Dawson Libertarian		Margin		Total
County	#	%	#	%	#	%	#	%	Total
Albany	6,772	59.50%	4,404	38.70%	205	1.80%	2,368	20.81%	11,381
Big Horn	1,438	34.42%	2,579	61.73%	161	3.85%	−1,141	−27.31%	4,178
Campbell	3,498	34.18%	6,501	63.52%	235	2.30%	−3,003	−29.34%	10,234
Carbon	3,493	58.35%	2,345	39.17%	148	2.47%	1,148	19.18%	5,986
Converse	2,092	46.79%	2,281	51.02%	98	2.19%	−189	−4.23%	4,471
Crook	931	33.03%	1,807	64.10%	81	2.87%	−876	−31.07%	2,819
Fremont	5,500	39.67%	8,108	58.47%	258	1.86%	−2,608	−18.81%	13,866
Goshen	1,893	40.34%	2,718	57.92%	82	1.75%	−825	−17.58%	4,693
Hot Springs	1,212	55.57%	942	43.19%	27	1.24%	270	12.38%	2,181
Johnson	1,263	40.22%	1,829	58.25%	48	1.53%	−566	−18.03%	3,140
Laramie	18,563	60.99%	11,487	37.74%	385	1.26%	7,076	23.25%	30,435
Lincoln	1,887	34.02%	3,520	63.47%	139	2.51%	−1,633	−29.44%	5,546
Natrona	13,175	55.80%	9,825	41.61%	610	2.58%	3,350	14.19%	23,610
Niobrara	411	33.77%	774	63.60%	32	2.63%	−363	−29.83%	1,217
Park	4,192	39.00%	6,287	58.49%	269	2.50%	−2,095	−19.49%	10,748
Platte	2,122	54.86%	1,645	42.53%	101	2.61%	477	12.33%	3,868
Sheridan	5,510	48.91%	5,567	49.41%	189	1.68%	−57	−0.51%	11,266
Sublette	1,025	39.27%	1,539	58.97%	46	1.76%	−514	−19.69%	2,610
Sweetwater	7,809	59.33%	5,026	38.18%	328	2.49%	2,783	21.14%	13,163
Teton	4,281	56.60%	3,128	41.35%	155	2.05%	1,153	15.24%	7,564
Uinta	3,004	47.58%	3,125	49.49%	185	2.93%	−121	−1.92%	6,314
Washakie	1,533	45.26%	1,805	53.29%	49	1.45%	−272	−8.03%	3,387
Weston	1,058	38.03%	1,631	58.63%	93	3.34%	−573	−20.60%	2,782
Totals	92,662	49.96%	88,873	47.92%	3,924	2.12%	3,789	2.04%	185,459

==== Counties that flipped from Republican to Democratic ====
- Hot Springs (largest city: Thermopolis)
- Natrona (largest city: Casper)
- Albany (largest city: Laramie)
- Platte (largest city: Wheatland)
- Teton (largest city: Jackson)
- Laramie (largest city: Cheyenne)
