= John Vinich =

American politician and attorney

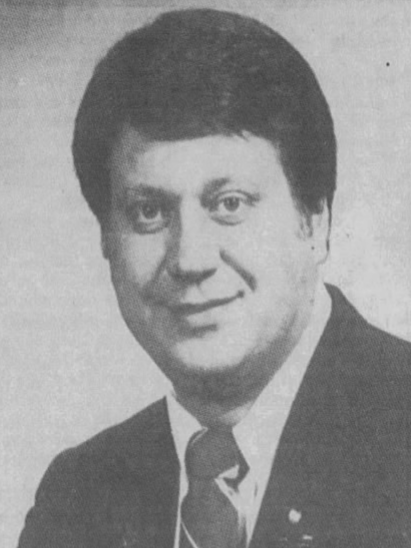
- Vinich in 1988

Member of the Wyoming Senate from the 25th district
- In office January 3, 1983 – January 4, 1999
- Preceded by: Hewitt Youth
- Succeeded by: Cale Case

Member of the Wyoming House of Representatives from the Fremont County district
- In office January 6, 1975 – January 3, 1983

Personal details
- Born: June 13, 1950 Hudson, Wyoming, U.S.
- Party: Democratic
- Spouse: Lynette Sparks
- Education: University of Wyoming (BA, JD)

John P. Vinich (June 13, 1950 ) is an American Democratic politician and attorney who served as a member of the Wyoming Legislature from 1975 to 1999. He served in the Wyoming House of Representatives from 1975 to 1983, and then in the Wyoming Senate from 1983 to 1999. He was the Democratic nominee for the U.S. Senate in 1988, and almost defeated incumbent Republican Senator Malcolm Wallop. He was also the Democratic nominee for Congress in the 1989 special election to replace Dick Cheney, and for Governor of Wyoming in 1998, losing both races by wider margins.

Party political offices
Preceded by Rodger McDaniel	Democratic nominee for U.S. Senator from Wyoming (Class 1); 1988	Succeeded by Mike Sullivan
Preceded by Kathy Karpan	Democratic nominee for Governor of Wyoming; 1998	Succeeded by Dave Freudenthal
