= Mary E. Odde =

Wyoming politician

Member of the Wyoming House of Representatives from the Fremont district
- In office 1981–1990

Mary E. Odde (February 18, 1918 – September 4, 1990) was an American politician and educator. She was the eldest of five children born to Charles C. McBeath, a ranch foreman, and Rebecca A. "Mamie" (Crawford) McBeath, a teacher. Born in Crawford, Texas, Odde graduated from high school in Littleton, Colorado, in 1935. Her family later moved to a ranch near Thermopolis, Wyoming. Odde earned a degree in Education from the University of Wyoming and later completed her master’s degree in teaching at Idaho State University.

Odde spent much of her career in Wyoming, first as a teacher in Hot Springs County and Shoshoni, where she worked for 24 years. She also became actively involved in the Wyoming Education Association, eventually serving as its president. From 1980 to 1990, she served five terms in the Wyoming House of Representatives as a representative from Fremont County. During her time in office, she was a member of the Judiciary Committee and chaired the subcommittee on children and families.

== Personal life ==
In 1941, Odde married Harold Odde in Cheyenne. The couple had a son who died in infancy and a daughter, Jo, who later married Jim Hartman. Odde was also a grandmother to six grandchildren.
