= Jim Geringer =

30th Governor of Wyoming

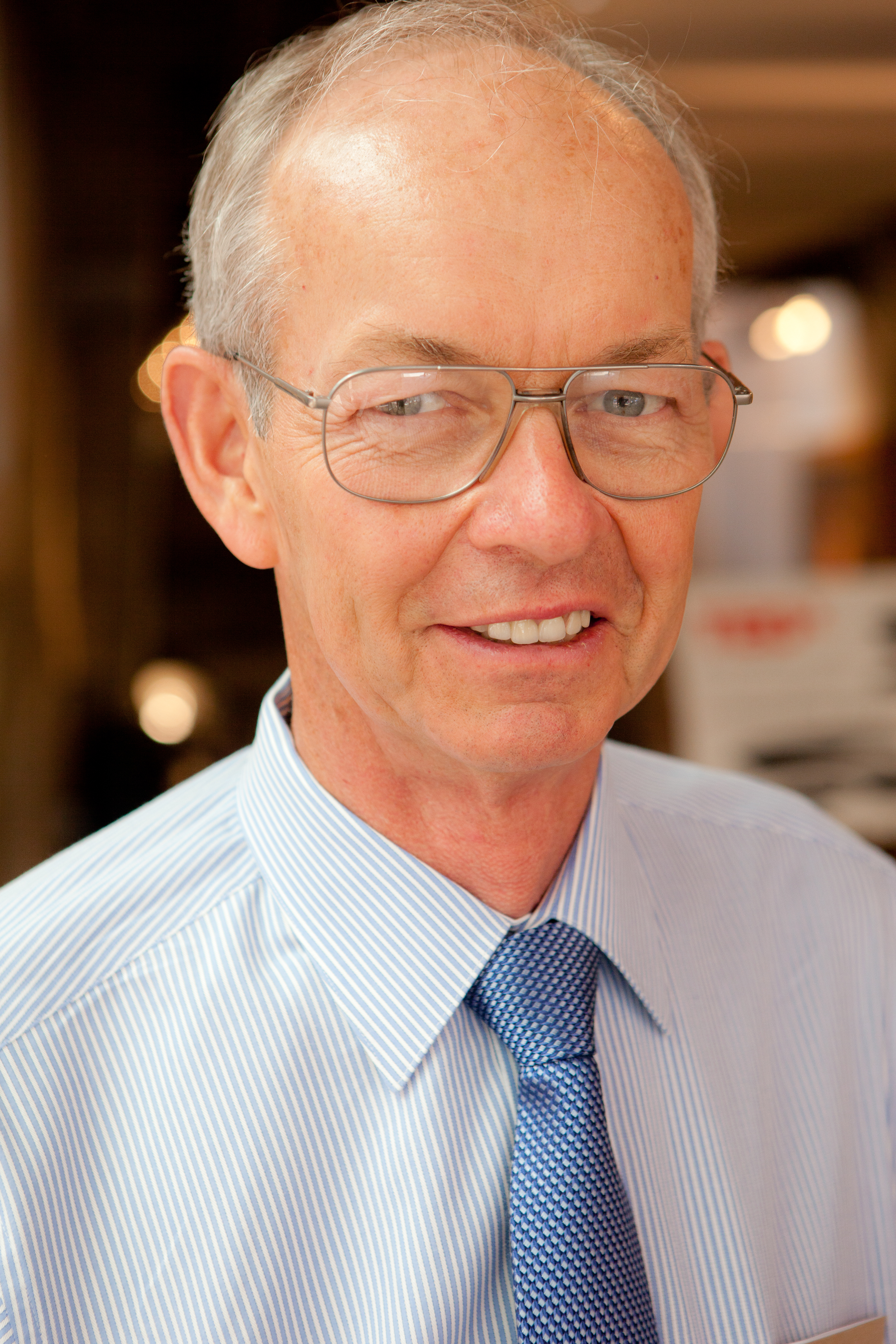
- Geringer in 2010

30th Governor of Wyoming
- In office January 2, 1995 – January 6, 2003
- Preceded by: Mike Sullivan
- Succeeded by: Dave Freudenthal

Member of the Wyoming Senate
- In office January 1989 – January 1995
- Succeeded by: Curt Meier
- Constituency: Platte County (1989–1992); 3rd district (1993–1995)

Personal details
- Born: James Edward Geringer; April 24, 1944 (age 82) Wheatland, Wyoming, U.S.
- Party: Republican
- Spouse: Sharyn Geringer (m. 1967)
- Children: 5
- Education: Kansas State University (BS)

Military service
- Allegiance: United States
- Branch/service: United States Air Force; Air Force Reserve
- Service years: 1967–1991

James Edward Geringer (/ɡɛrɪŋər/; born April 24, 1944) is an American politician who was the 30th governor of Wyoming, serving from 1995 to 2003.

== Early life and education ==
Geringer was born and raised on a farm in Wheatland, Wyoming. His father, Gottlieb Geringer, was a Volga German from Lauwe (now Yablonovka, Saratov Oblast) in the Russian Empire, and his mother, Edla Malin (née Johnson), was of Swedish descent. He attended Kansas State University and was a member of Triangle Fraternity, earning a degree in mechanical engineering. He served for ten years in the United States Air Force before retiring. He briefly worked at a power generating station in Wheatland before purchasing a farm.

== Politics ==
In 1982, Geringer successfully ran as a Republican for a seat in the Wyoming House of Representatives. After serving there for six years, he won the Platte County seat in the Wyoming Senate in 1988. After the state legislature switched from a county-based apportionment system to a district based apportionment system, in 1992, Geringer was elected to represent the 3rd senate district. In 1994, Geringer was elected as Wyoming's governor.

Geringer was generally a conservative throughout his political career. As governor, he helped pass laws that regulated class action lawsuits, reformed bankruptcy laws, toughened crime laws, legalized charter schools, and lowered taxes. However, he broke with the Republican Party in supporting environmental rulings and the Equal Rights Amendment.

In 1997, Governor Geringer called for a boycott of America Online after Sondra London posted a series of murder confessions sent to her from "Happy Face Killer" Keith Jesperson, protesting that he found the items to be offensive. Although London voluntarily removed the pages in question, AOL banned her from the AOL domain, which in turn prompted an outpouring of support from all over the World Wide Web, including multiple offers of free server space.

After serving as governor, he joined Redlands, California based ESRI as director of policy and public sector strategies.

Geringer is one of the founding governors of Western Governors University (WGU) and is currently an emeritus trustee on the WGU Board of Trustees.

Party political offices
Preceded by Mary Mead	Republican nominee for Governor of Wyoming; 1994, 1998	Succeeded by Eli Bebout
Political offices
Preceded by Mike Sullivan	Governor of Wyoming; 1995–2003	Succeeded by Dave Freudenthal
U.S. order of precedence (ceremonial)
Preceded by Mike Sullivan as Former Governor	Order of precedence of the United States	Succeeded by Dave Freudenthal as Former Governor
