= 1982 United States Senate election in Wyoming =

- November 2, 1982
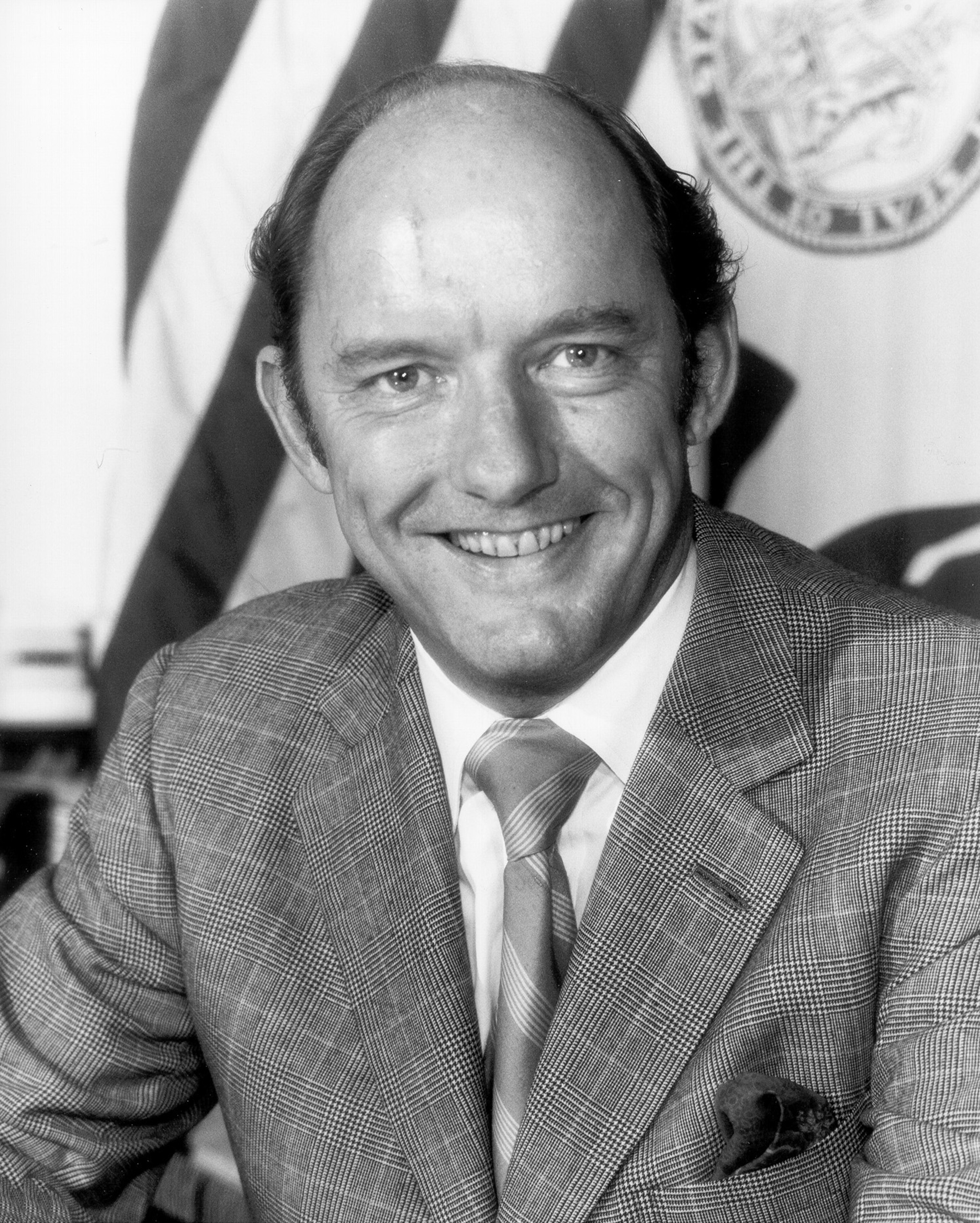

Nominee	Malcolm Wallop	Rodger McDaniel
Party	Republican	Democratic
Popular vote	94,725	72,466
Percentage	56.66%	43.34%
- County results Wallop: 50–60% 60–70% 70–80% McDaniel: 50–60%
U.S. senator before election
Malcolm Wallop
Republican
Elected U.S. Senator
Malcolm Wallop
Republican

The 1982 United States Senate election in Wyoming took place on November 2, 1982. Incumbent Republican Senator Malcolm Wallop ran for his second term. He was challenged in the general election by former State Senator Rodger McDaniel, the Democratic nominee. Despite the strong national environment for Democratic candidates that year, Democratic Governor Edgar Herschler's landslide re-election, and the closeness of Wallop's campaign with former Democratic Senator Gale W. McGee in 1976, the contest between Wallop and McDaniel was largely non-competitive. Wallop won re-election by a wide margin, winning 57% of the vote to McDaniel's 43%. This was the first time since 1911 that an incumbent Republican Senator was re-elected to this seat.

== Democratic primary ==
=== Candidates ===
- Rodger McDaniel, former State Senator

=== Results ===
Democratic primary
Party	Candidate	Votes	%
Democratic	Rodger McDaniel	46,834	100.00%
Total votes		46,834	100.00%

== Republican primary ==
=== Candidates ===
- Malcolm Wallop, incumbent U.S. Senator
- Richard Redland, rancher, far-right activist

=== Results ===
Republican primary
Party	Candidate	Votes	%
Republican	Malcolm Wallop (incumbent)	61,650	80.91%
Republican	Richard Redland, Jr.	14,543	19.09%
Total votes		76,193	100.00%

== General election ==
=== Results ===
1982 United States Senate election in Wyoming
Party	Candidate	Votes	%	±%
Republican	Malcolm Wallop (incumbent)	94,725	56.66%	+2.07%
Democratic	Rodger McDaniel	72,466	43.34%	−2.07%
Majority		22,259	13.31%	+4.14%
Turnout		167,191		
Republican hold				
