= Dave Freudenthal =

Governor of Wyoming from 2003 to 2011

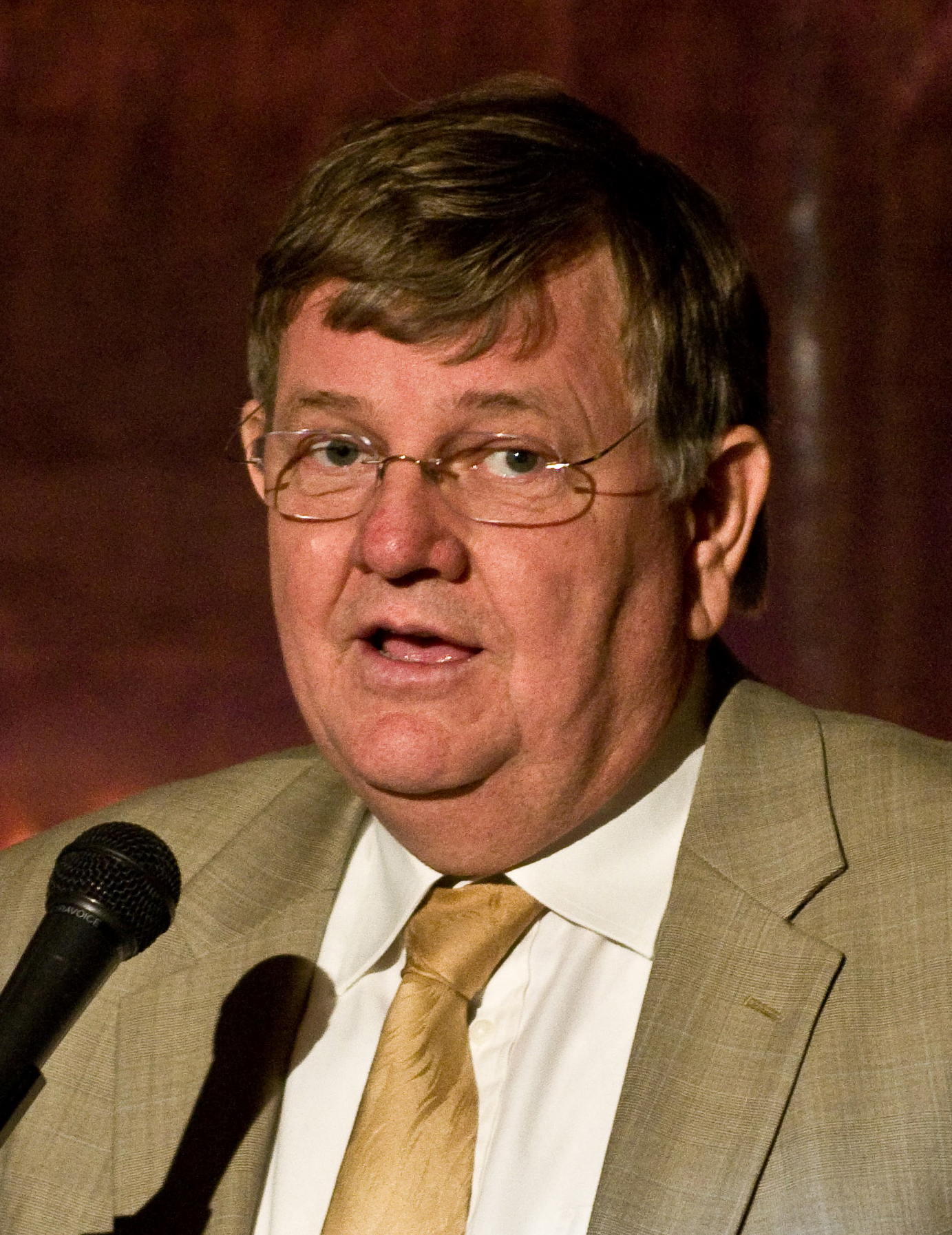
- Freudenthal in 2008

31st Governor of Wyoming
- In office January 6, 2003 – January 3, 2011
- Preceded by: Jim Geringer
- Succeeded by: Matt Mead

United States Attorney for the District of Wyoming
- In office March 25, 1994 – May 2001
- President: Bill Clinton; George W. Bush
- Preceded by: Richard Stacy
- Succeeded by: Matt Mead

Personal details
- Born: David Duane Freudenthal; October 12, 1950 (age 76) Thermopolis, Wyoming, U.S.
- Party: Democratic
- Spouse: Nancy Roan
- Children: 4
- Education: Amherst College (BA); University of Wyoming (JD)

David Duane Freudenthal (born October 12, 1950) is an American politician, attorney and economist who served as the 31st governor of Wyoming from 2003 to 2011. A member of the Democratic Party, he previously served from 1994 to 2001 as the United States Attorney for the District of Wyoming. As of 2026, he is the most recent Democrat to have won or held statewide office in Wyoming.

== Biography ==
=== Education and career ===
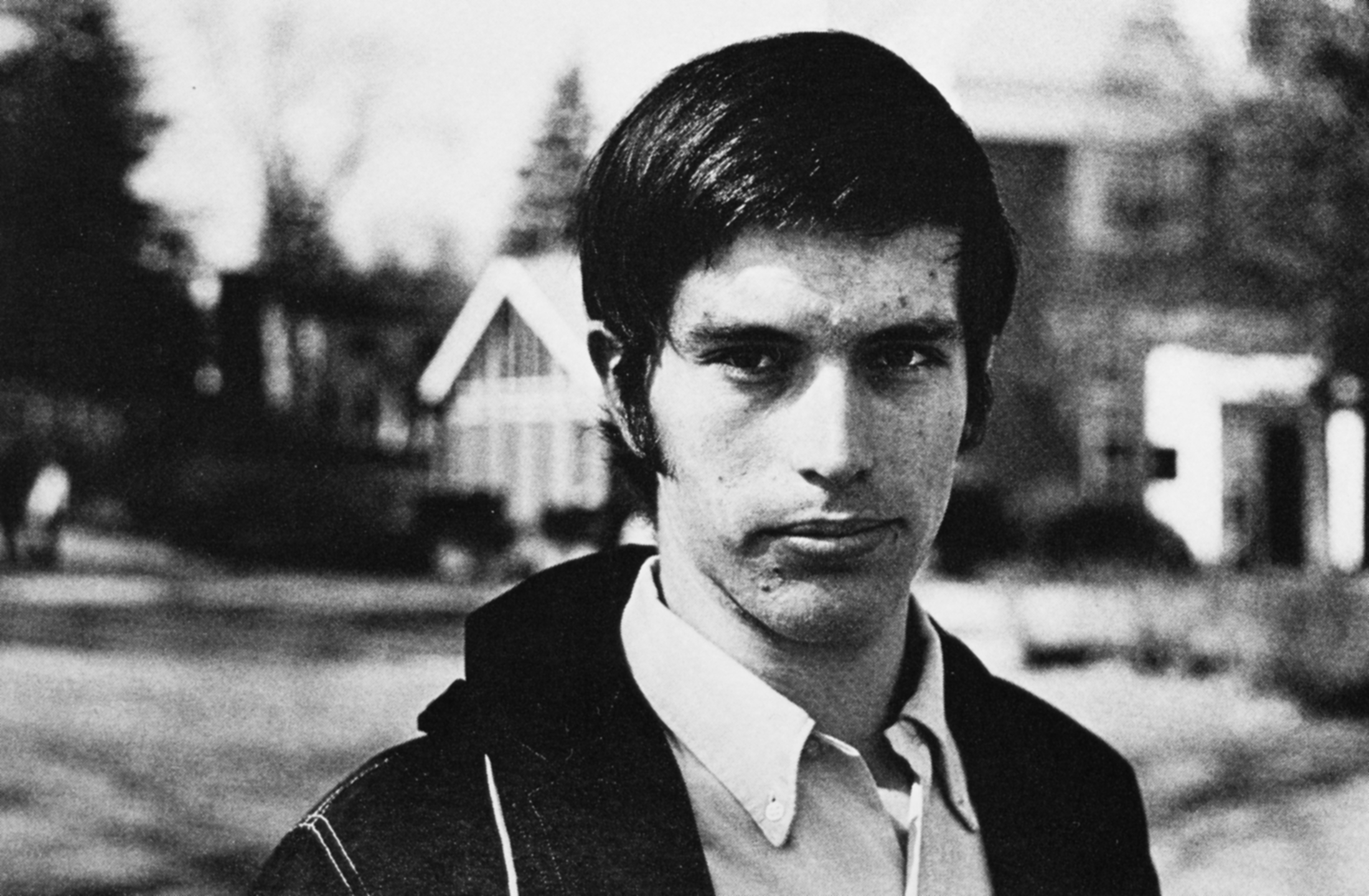
Freudenthal in the Amherst College yearbook, 1973

Dave Freudenthal was born in Thermopolis, the seat of Hot Springs County in north central Wyoming, the seventh of eight children; he grew up on a farm north of town. Eventually, he graduated from Amherst College in Amherst, Massachusetts, in 1973 with a bachelor's degree in economics. After graduating, he got a job with the Department of Economic Planning and Development as an economist and later became the state planning director for Governor Edgar Herschler.

Freudenthal received his J.D. degree from the University of Wyoming College of Law in 1980 and went into private practice. After retiring as governor, Freudenthal briefly worked at the law firm of Crowell & Moring as senior counsel in the firm's Cheyenne, Wyoming office before it closed.

=== Political career ===
In 1994, upon the recommendation of Governor Mike Sullivan, Freudenthal was appointed United States Attorney for the District of Wyoming. He left this post in May 2001 and was replaced by future governor Matt Mead.

==== Governor of Wyoming ====
In 2002, Freudenthal contested the Democratic primary for the gubernatorial election held later that year and won with over 50% of the vote against a field of opponents. He went on to be elected governor of Wyoming on November 5, 2002 with 50% of the vote. He ran for reelection on November 7, 2006, and improved his vote count to 70%, sweeping every county in the state. Freudenthal announced on March 4, 2010 that he would not attempt to seek a third term as governor after speculation he would push to repeal state law on term limits; the law limited governors to eight years in office during a 16-year period. During his time in office, he faced the challenge of dealing with the reintroduction of the Grey wolf into Yellowstone National Park. This was a challenge, because it had the eventuality to cause strain economically to Wyoming.

Freudenthal remained consistently popular with his constituents throughout his tenure, even though he was a Democrat in a state that had turned almost solidly Republican. As governor he often took rather conservative positions, leading to disagreements with federal officials and environmental groups. In fact, Freudenthal and his eventual Republican successor, Matt Mead, notably held similar positions on various issues. The majority of his two terms oversaw an enormous energy boom and surpluses in government revenue, although this was later reversed after the Great Recession; Freudenthal then called for cuts to state agencies as growth continued to slow. In June 2007, following the death of Republican U.S. Senator Craig Thomas, he appointed Republican John Barrasso to the United States Senate; state law required him to select an appointee from a shortlist compiled by the Senator's party.

== Personal life ==
Freudenthal is married to Nancy D. Freudenthal, a native of Cody, who serves as a judge on the United States District Court for the District of Wyoming. They have four children. His brother, Steve Freudenthal, served as Attorney General under Governor Edgar Herschler and was a member of the state House of Representatives. In 2008, while serving as Governor, Freudenthal underwent surgery on his shoulder; during this time Secretary of State Max Maxfield served as acting governor for a short time. He is an Episcopalian.

== Electoral history ==
Wyoming gubernatorial election, 2002
Party	Candidate	Votes	%	±%
Democratic	Dave Freudenthal	92,662	49.96%	
Republican	Eli Bebout	88,873	47.92%	
Libertarian	Dave Dawson	3,924	2.12%	

Wyoming gubernatorial election, 2006
Party	Candidate	Votes	%	±%
Democratic	Dave Freudenthal (incumbent)	135,516	69.99%	+20.03%
Republican	Ray Hunkins	58,100	30.01%	−17.91%

== Notes ==
Party political offices
Preceded by John Vinich	Democratic nominee for Governor of Wyoming; 2002, 2006	Succeeded by Leslie Petersen
Political offices
Preceded by Jim Geringer	Governor of Wyoming; 2003–2011	Succeeded by Matt Mead
U.S. order of precedence (ceremonial)
Preceded by Jim Geringer as Former Governor	Order of precedence of the United States	Succeeded by Matt Mead as Former Governor
