= Rodger McDaniel =

American politician

Member of the Wyoming Senate
- In office 1977–1981

Member of the Wyoming House of Representatives
- In office 1971–1977

Personal details
- Born: August 14, 1948 (age 78) Leadville, Colorado, U.S.
- Party: Democratic
- Spouse: Patricia
- Children: 2
- Education: University of Wyoming College of Law (JD); Iliff School of Theology (MDiv)
- Profession: Politician, lawyer

Rodger McDaniel (born August 14, 1948) is an American politician from the state of Wyoming. He is a member of the Democratic Party. McDaniel has served in the Wyoming Senate and Wyoming House of Representatives.

== Career ==
Rodger McDaniel was born in Leadville, Colorado, on August 14, 1948. He moved with his family to Cheyenne, Wyoming, as a small child. A lifelong Democrat and champion of Democratic causes, McDaniel served as the Wyoming Administrative Aide to U.S. Representative Teno Roncalio (D-WY) for several years prior to Rep. Roncalio's retirement. McDaniel was elected to the Wyoming State House of Representatives in 1971 at the age of 22. He went on to serve in the Wyoming Senate until 1981. In 1982, McDaniel ran unsuccessfully against U.S. Senator Malcolm Wallop (R-WY). During his tenure as a state legislator, McDaniel was named One of the Ten Outstanding State Legislators in America" by the Assembly of Government Employees. He has also served on the Board of Trustees of Laramie County Community College.

McDaniel graduated from the University of Wyoming College of Law with a Juris Doctor Degree and practiced law for twenty years, specializing in employment and insurance law and government relations. McDaniel also served as the Wyoming lobbyist for State Farm Insurance and Anheuser Busch Companies for all of his legal career. He also participated, as a member of the Lawyer's Guild, as a human rights observer in Guatemala.

From 1991 to 1992, McDaniel and his family joined Habitat for Humanity as International Partners in Guatemala and Nicaragua. McDaniel earned a master's degree in Divinity Degree with Honors in 1999. He was later named an Outstanding Alumni of the school.

Between 1999 and 2002, McDaniel consulted for the Wyoming Department of Health's Substance Abuse Division, where he co-authored, with Dr. Dennis Embry, Reclaiming Wyoming: A Comprehensive Blueprint for Prevention, Early Intervention and Treatment of Substance Abuse. Governor Dave Freudenthal appointed McDaniel Director of the Department of Family Services in 2002. In 2006, Governor Freudenthal appointed him deputy director of the Wyoming Department of Health with responsibility for the Substance Abuse and Mental Health Division.

In 2013, Rodger McDaniel authored a book on the relationship between Joseph McCarthy and Lester Hunt, entitled Dying for Joe McCarthy's Sins: The Suicide of Wyoming Senator Lester Hunt.

In 2018, the University of Nebraska Press published his book entitled "The Man in the Arena: The Life and Times of U.S. Senator Gale McGee." In 2022, he wrote a book entitled "Profiles in Courage: Standing Against the Wyoming Wind." He served as the Pastor of Highlands United Presbyterian Church in Cheyenne from 2008 until his retirement in 2023. He wrote approximately 700 weekly columns for the Wyoming State Tribune and the Laramie Boomerang between 2011 and 2026.

Rodger McDaniel resides in Laramie, Wyoming with his wife Patricia. They have two adult children and five grandchildren.

== Bibliography ==
- McDaniel, Rodger (2013). Dying for Joe McCarthy's Sins: The Suicide of Wyoming Senator Lester Hunt. WordsWorth. ISBN 978-0983027591.

Party political offices
Preceded by Gale W. McGee	Democratic nominee for U.S. Senator from Wyoming (Class 1); 1982	Succeeded by John P. Vinich
