= Charles Pelkey =

American politician

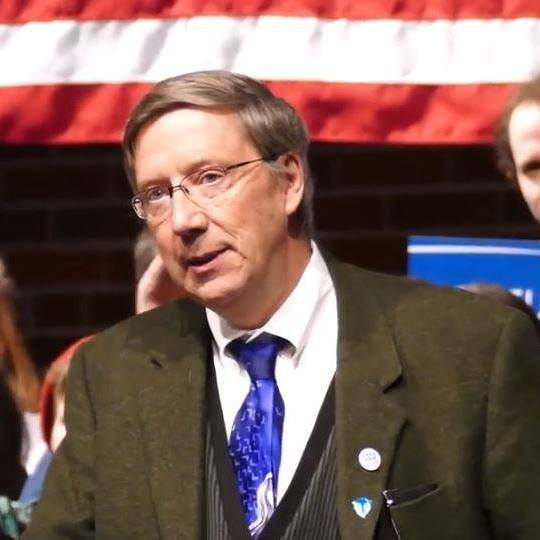

Member of the Wyoming House of Representatives from the 45th district
- In office January 5, 2015 – January 4, 2021
- Preceded by: Matt Greene
- Succeeded by: Karlee Provenza

Personal details
- Born: May 30, 1958 (age 68) Göppingen, West Germany
- Party: Democratic
- Spouse: Diana Denison (m. 1986)
- Children: Philip (1994), Annika (2000)
- Education: University of Wyoming College of Law
- Profession: Attorney (former Journalist)

Charles Pelkey (born May 30, 1958) is a German-born American attorney, politician, and former Wyoming state legislator. A member of the Democratic Party, Pelkey represented the 45th state House district from 2015 to 2021.

== Early life and family ==
Pelkey was born in Göppingen, West Germany. His mother, Carla (née Ticak), was a post-war refugee from Yugoslavia. His father, Charles F. Pelkey Sr. was a Master Sergeant in the 503rd Engineer Light Equipment Company of the U.S. Army. Pelkey's parents separated in 1964 and his mother moved to Denver, Colorado with her three children in 1966. Pelkey graduated from Iver C. Ranum High School in Westminster, Colorado, in 1976, before moving to Laramie to attend the University of Wyoming in August of that year.

Pelkey and Diana Denison were married on August 6, 1986. They have two children, Philip (born in 1994) and Annika (born in 2000).

== Education, career and personal life ==
Pelkey attended the University of Wyoming as an undergraduate, but never earned a degree, instead embarking on a 25-year career as a journalist.

Pelkey worked as a reporter for Wyoming Public Radio and then as a reporter at Wyoming's Casper Star-Tribune, before leaving to join the staff of U.S. Senator Alan K. Simpson. Pelkey served as the then-GOP-Whip's Press Secretary.

In 1994, Pelkey became an editor at the cycling magazine VeloNews and spent 17 years reporting on the sport of professional cycling. He served as the magazine's lead reporter covering the sport's doping problem. Pelkey was portrayed by British-American actor Nathan Wiley in the 2015 film The Program, a biopic based on Sunday Times reporter David Walsh's book, Seven Deadly Sins: My Pursuit of Lance Armstrong.

In 2006, Pelkey applied for admission to the University of Wyoming College of Law and was awarded a Juris Doctor in 2009. He was a founding partner of the Laramie-based criminal defense law firm, Neubauer, Pelkey, & Goldfinger, LLP.

After his retirement from the Legislature and his law practice, Pelkey accepted a job at Wyoming Public Radio as host of Morning Edition, the same position he held 38 years earlier.

In 2011, Pelkey was diagnosed with breast cancer. He underwent a lumpectomy, a double mastectomy and five months' of chemo therapy. He has often served as a spokesman for that small minority of patients with male breast cancer arguing that the most dangerous aspect of the disease is that many men do not believe that they can get breast cancer, leading to a late diagnosis and often-fatal results.

== Elections ==
=== 2014 ===
In 2014, Pelkey announced his candidacy and ran unopposed in the Democratic primary.

Incumbent Republican Representative Matt Greene announced his retirement and Pelkey faced Republican candidate Charles Young in the general election. Pelkey won the seat by a 53% to 47% margin. Pelkey's win was one of three Democratic pickups in the state, as Democrats gained seats in the legislature.

=== 2016 ===
In January 2016, Pelkey was the only member of the Wyoming Legislature to endorse Bernie Sanders for President in advance of that state's presidential caucuses.

Pelkey was unopposed in the Democratic Party's August, 2016 primary. He defeated Republican Tom Schmit in November's General Election, winning with a margin of 52.29% to 47.71%.

Following the 2016 General Election, Pelkey was elected as Minority Whip of the Wyoming House.

=== 2018 ===
Pelkey filed for reelection to a third term in May 2018. He was unopposed in the Democratic primary and faced Republican Roxie Hensley in November's general election. Pelkey won the election, earning 60.1% of the vote to Hensley's 39.9%. Following the November election, Pelkey was re-elected as Minority Whip in the Wyoming House by members of the Democratic caucus.

=== 2020 ===
On the final day of the 2020 budget session, Pelkey announced his retirement from the Legislature. He subsequently endorsed local community activist, Karlee Provenza's campaign for Wyoming's House District 45. Provenza went on to win the General Election, defeating Republican Roxie Hensley.
