= The Program (2015 film) =

Biographical film about Lance Armstrong

- Theatrical release poster
- Directed by: Stephen Frears
- Screenplay by: John Hodge
- Based on: Seven Deadly Sins by David Walsh
- Produced by: Tim Bevan; Eric Fellner; Tracey Seaward; Kate Solomon
- Starring: Ben Foster; Chris O'Dowd; Guillaume Canet; Jesse Plemons; Lee Pace; Denis Ménochet; Dustin Hoffman
- Cinematography: Danny Cohen
- Edited by: Valerio Bonelli
- Music by: Alex Heffes
- Production companies: Anton Capital Entertainment; Working Title Films
- Distributed by: StudioCanal
- Release dates: 14 September 2015 (TIFF); 16 September 2015 (France); 14 October 2015 (United Kingdom)
- Running time: 103 minutes
- Countries: United Kingdom; France; Luxembourg
- Language: English
- Box office: $3.3 million

The Program (working title, Icon) is a 2015 biographical drama film about Lance Armstrong directed by Stephen Frears, starring Ben Foster as Armstrong and Chris O'Dowd as journalist David Walsh.

The film is based on Walsh's 2012 book, Seven Deadly Sins. It premiered at the 2015 Toronto International Film Festival 14 September 2015, and was theatrically released in France 16 September and the United Kingdom 14 October.

== Cast ==
- Ben Foster as Lance Armstrong
- Chris O'Dowd as David Walsh
- Guillaume Canet as Michele Ferrari
- Jesse Plemons as Floyd Landis
- Lee Pace as Bill Stapleton
- Denis Menochet as Johan Bruyneel
- Dustin Hoffman as Bob Hamman
- Edward Hogg as Frankie Andreu
- Elaine Cassidy as Betsy Andreu
- Laura Donnelly as Emma O'Reilly
- Sam Hoare as Stephen Swart
- Kevin Hulsmans as Filippo Simeoni
- John Schwab as Travis Tygart
- Lucien Guignard as Alberto Contador
- Nicolas Robin as Christophe Bassons
- James Harkness as Wayne
- Josh O'Connor as Rich
- Nathan Wiley as Charles Pelkey

== Production ==
=== Development ===
Director Stephen Frears had the idea to make a film about Lance Armstrong after reading a review of Tyler Hamilton's book The Secret Race. Unable to acquire the rights for Hamilton's book, he settled on Walsh's Seven Deadly Sins instead. Frears turned to screenwriter John Hodge to write the script, partly because of Hodge's experience as a doctor.

Hodge has said that he based his screenplay primarily on Seven Deadly Sins, in addition to other journalism and affidavits from cyclists. Hodge says that he ruled out using Armstrong's own accounts of his behavior during this period, and that scenes shown from Armstrong's perspective are fiction.

=== Casting ===
Lee Pace joined the cast November 2013. Dustin Hoffman joined the cast December 2013.

To better understand his role, Foster took performance-enhancing drugs while shooting the film.

=== Filming ===
Principal photography began October 2013.

== Reception ==
=== Box office ===
The Program grossed $3.3 million worldwide. It was released for U.S. rentals on DirecTV 19 February 2016, with a cinema release 18 March 2016.

=== Critical response ===
On Rotten Tomatoes, the film has a rating of 62%, based on 111 reviews, with an average rating of 6/10. The site's consensus reads, "Ben Foster's impressive efforts to channel Lance Armstrong are often enough to power The Program past director Stephen Frears' frustrating unwillingness to delve deeper into its real-life story." On Metacritic, the film has a score of 53 out of 100, based on 20 critics, indicating "mixed or average reviews".

== See also ==
- List of films about bicycles and cycling
