= History of Lance Armstrong doping allegations =

Cycling doping allegations

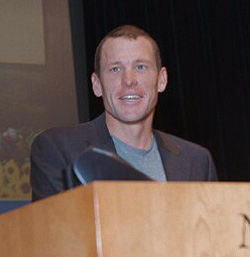
Armstrong in 2003

For much of the second phase of his career, American cyclist Lance Armstrong faced constant allegations of doping, including doping at the Tour de France and in the Lance Armstrong doping case. Armstrong vehemently denied allegations of using performance enhancing drugs for 13 years, until a confession during a broadcast interview with Oprah Winfrey in January 2013, when he finally admitted to all his cheating in sports, stating, "I view this situation as one big lie that I repeated a lot of times".

== Background ==
If you consider my situation: a guy who comes back from arguably, you know, a death sentence [Armstrong's 1996 cancer diagnosis and treatment], why would I then enter into a sport and dope myself up and risk my life again? That's crazy. I would never do that. No. No way.

— Lance Armstrong, 2005

Lance Armstrong had been criticized for his disagreements with outspoken opponents of doping, such as sports journalist Paul Kimmage and cyclist Christophe Bassons. Bassons wrote a number of articles for a French newspaper during the 1999 Tour de France which made references to doping in the peloton. Subsequently, Armstrong started a confrontation during that Tour where he rode up alongside Bassons on the Alpe d'Huez stage to, according to Bassons, tell him "it was a mistake to speak out the way I do and [Armstrong] asked why I was doing it. I told him that I'm thinking of the next generation of riders. Then he said, 'Why don't you leave, then?'" Armstrong later confirmed Bassons' story in an interview with the French television station TF1, saying, "His accusations aren't good for cycling, for his team, for me, for anybody. If he thinks cycling works like that, he's wrong and he would be better off going home."

Kimmage, a professional cyclist in the 1980s, referred to Armstrong as a "cancer in cycling". He also asked Armstrong questions in relation to his "admiration for dopers" at a press conference at the Tour of California in 2009, provoking a scathing reaction from Armstrong. This spat continued and is exemplified by Kimmage's articles in the British newspaper The Sunday Times. David Walsh, a Sunday Times reporter referred to by Armstrong as a "little troll", revealed in a 2001 story that Armstrong had ties to controversial Italian doctor Michele Ferrari. Two years later, Walsh's book L.A. Confidentiel alleged, based on testimony by Armstrong's former masseuse Emma O'Reilly, that clandestine trips were made to pick up and deliver doping products to Armstrong's team.

Until his 2013 admission, Armstrong continually denied using illegal performance-enhancing drugs and described himself as the most tested athlete in the world. However, a 1999 urine sample showed traces of corticosteroid; a medical certificate showed he used an approved cream for saddle sores which contained the substance. O'Reilly claimed that team officials conspired with a compliant doctor to falsify Armstrong's prescription, and that Armstrong never had the condition. She also claimed that, on other occasions, she was asked to dispose of used syringes for Armstrong and pick up strange parcels for the team.

From his return to cycling in the fall of 2008 through March 2009, Armstrong claimed that he submitted to twenty-four unannounced drug tests by various anti-doping authorities. All of the tests were negative for performance-enhancing drugs.

U.S. federal prosecutors pursued allegations of doping by Armstrong from 2010–2012. The effort convened a grand jury to investigate doping charges, including: taking statements under oath from Armstrong's former team members and other associates; met with officials from France, Belgium, Spain, and Italy; and requested samples from the French Anti-Doping Agency (AFLD). The investigation was led by Jeff Novitzky, an investigator from the Food and Drug Administration (FDA), who also investigated suspicions of steroid use by baseball players Barry Bonds and Roger Clemens. The probe was terminated on February 3, 2012 with no charges filed.

=== Specific allegations ===
==== 1995–2005 ====
According to former cyclist Stephen Swart, Armstrong first began using performance-enhancing drugs during his time with the Motorola cycling team in the mid-1990s, and actively encouraged his teammates to do the same. "He was the instigator," Swart told Sports Illustrated. "It was his words that pushed us toward doing it." Swart also admitted to doping.

Public accusations of doping against Armstrong were made as early as the 1999 Tour de France. Specifically, many European papers contended his victory in Stage 9, where he seemingly ascended the Alps with almost no difficulty, could not have been possible through natural means. Armstrong adamantly denied this, and the American press generally supported him. Armstrong contended, among other things, that it would have made no sense for him to dope since he lived in France, which has long had some of the strictest anti-doping laws in the world, for most of the year.

Armstrong was criticized for working with Ferrari, who later claimed that the two were introduced by Belgian cyclist Eddy Merckx in 1995. American cyclist Greg LeMond described himself as "devastated" on hearing of them working together, while Tour organizer Jean-Marie Leblanc said, "I am not happy the two names are mixed." Following Ferrari's later-overturned conviction for "sporting fraud" and "abuse of the medical profession", Armstrong claimed to have suspended his professional relationship with him, saying that he had "zero tolerance for anyone convicted of using or facilitating the use of performance-enhancing drugs" and denying that Ferrari had ever "suggested, prescribed or provided me with any performance-enhancing drugs."

Ferrari was later absolved of all sporting fraud charges by an Italian appeals court, as well as charges of abusing his medical license to write prescriptions. The court stated that it overturned his conviction "because the facts do not exist" to support the charges. Ferrari, however, is still banned from practicing medicine with cyclists by the Italian Cycling Federation. According to Italian authorities, Armstrong met with Ferrari as recently as 2010 in a country outside of Italy.

In 2004, Walsh and fellow reporter Pierre Ballester published a French-language book alleging Armstrong had used performance-enhancing drugs, entitled L. A. Confidentiel – Les secrets de Lance Armstrong. On top of O'Reilly's aforementioned allegations, the book also contained Stephen Swart's allegation of doping by Armstrong and others on the Motorola team; this claim was denied by other team members.

Allegations in the book were reprinted in The Sunday Times in a story by deputy sports editor Alan English in June 2004. Armstrong sued for libel, and the paper settled out of court after a High Court judge in a pre-trial ruling stated that the article "meant accusation of guilt and not simply reasonable grounds to suspect." The newspaper's lawyers stated, "The Sunday Times has confirmed to Mr. Armstrong that it never intended to accuse him of being guilty of taking any performance-enhancing drugs and sincerely apologized for any such impression." Ballester and Walsh subsequently published L.A. Official and Le Sale Tour (The Dirty Trick), further pressing their claims that Armstrong used performance-enhancing drugs throughout his career.

On March 31, 2005, Mike Anderson, Armstrong's personal assistant of two years, filed a brief in Travis County District Court in Texas, as part of a legal battle following his termination in November 2004. In the brief, Anderson claimed that he discovered a box of androstenone while cleaning a bathroom in Armstrong's apartment in Girona, Spain. Androstenone is not a banned substance, and Anderson stated in a subsequent deposition that he had no direct knowledge of Armstrong using such substances. Armstrong denied the claim and issued a counter-suit. The two men reached an out-of-court settlement in November 2005; the terms of the agreement were not disclosed.

==== 2006–2008 ====
In June 2006, the French newspaper Le Monde reported claims by Frankie and Betsy Andreu during a deposition that Armstrong had admitted using performance-enhancing drugs to his physician just after brain surgery in 1996. The Andreus' testimony was related to litigation between Armstrong and SCA Promotions, a Dallas-based insurer who balked at paying a US$5 million bonus for Armstrong's sixth Tour victory due to the claims raised in L.A. Confidentiel. The suit was settled out of court, with SCA paying Armstrong and Tailwind Sports US$7.5 million, to cover the bonus plus interest and lawyers' fees. Betsy Andreu's testimony stated, "And so the doctor asked him a few questions, not many, and then one of the questions he asked was, 'Have you ever used any performance-enhancing drugs?' And Lance said yes. And the doctor asked, 'What were they?' And Lance said, 'Growth hormone, cortisone, EPO, steroids and testosterone.'"

Armstrong suggested Betsy may have been confused by possible mention of his post-operative treatment, which included steroids and EPO that are taken to counteract the side effects of intensive chemotherapy. The Andreus' allegation was not supported by the eight other people present, including Armstrong's doctor Craig Nichols, or his medical history. According to LeMond, he had recorded a conversation, transcribed for review by NPR, in which Armstrong's contact at Oakley, Inc., Stephanie McIlvain, corroborated Betsy's account. However, McIlvain contradicted LeMond's allegations and denied under oath that the incident ever occurred.

In July 2006, the Los Angeles Times published a story on the allegations raised in the SCA case. The report cited evidence at the trial, including the results of an AFLD test and an analysis of these results by an expert witness. According to the Times, Australian researcher Michael Ashenden testified that Armstrong's levels rose and fell, consistent with a series of injections during the 1999 Tour. Ashenden, a paid expert retained by SCA Promotions, told arbitrators the results painted a "compelling picture" that the world's most famous cyclist "used EPO in the '99 Tour."

SCA president Bob Hamman knew his chances of winning the suit were slim, since the language in SCA's contract with Armstrong stipulated that the money had to be paid. However, he believed that the testimony and evidence would prove that Armstrong had doped, and would be enough to trigger an investigation by sporting authorities. Hamman's hunch proved right; before the Times ran its story on the case, USADA general counsel Travis Tygart contacted Hamman and asked to see the evidence he'd gleaned.

==== 2009–2011 ====
Ashenden's findings were disputed by the Vrijman report, which pointed to procedural and privacy issues in dismissing the AFLD test results. The Times article also provided information on testimony given by Swart, the Andreus, and an instant messaging conversation between Frankie and Jonathan Vaughters regarding blood-doping in the peloton. Vaughters signed a statement disavowing the comments and stating he had "no personal knowledge that any team in the Tour de France, including Armstrong's Discovery team in 2005, engaged in any prohibited conduct whatsoever." Frankie signed a statement affirming the conversation took place as indicated on the instant messaging logs submitted to the court. The SCA trial was settled out of court, and while no verdict or finding of facts was rendered, Armstrong regarded the outcome as proof that the doping allegations were baseless.

On May 20, 2010, former U.S. Postal teammate Floyd Landis – who had previously been stripped of the 2006 Tour title after a positive drug test – accused Armstrong of doping in 2002 and 2003. Landis also claimed that Postal team director Johan Bruyneel had bribed Hein Verbruggen, former president of the Union Cycliste Internationale (UCI), to keep quiet about a positive Armstrong test in 2002. Landis admitted there was no documentation supporting his claims. However, in July 2010 the president of the UCI, Pat McQuaid, confirmed that Armstrong made two donations to cycling's governing body: $25,000 in 2002, used by the juniors anti-doping program, and $100,000 in 2005, to buy a blood testing machine.

Landis also maintained that he witnessed Armstrong receiving multiple blood transfusions, and dispensing testosterone patches to his teammates. On May 25, 2010, the UCI disputed Landis's claims, insisting that "none of the tests revealed the presence of EPO in the samples taken from riders at the 2001 Tour of Switzerland." According to ESPN, "Landis claimed that Armstrong tested positive while winning in 2002, a timeline Armstrong himself said left him 'confused,' because he did not compete in the event in 2002."

In May 2011, former Armstrong teammate Tyler Hamilton told CBS News that he and Armstrong had together taken EPO before and during the 1999, 2000, and 2001 Tours de France. Armstrong's attorney, Mark Fabiani, responded that Hamilton was lying. The accompanying 60 Minutes investigation alleged that two other former Armstrong teammates, Frankie Andreu and George Hincapie, had told federal investigators that they witnessed Armstrong taking banned substances, including EPO, or supplied Armstrong with such substances. Fabiani stated in response that, "We have no way of knowing what happened in the grand jury and so can't comment on these anonymously sourced reports." Hamilton further claimed that Armstrong tested positive for EPO during the 2001 Tour de Suisse; 60 Minutes reported that the UCI intervened to conceal those test results, and that donations from Armstrong totaling US$125,000 may have played into said actions.

Martial Saugy, chief of the Swiss anti-doping agency, later confirmed that they found four urine samples suspicious of EPO use at the 2001 race, but said there was no "positive test" and claimed not to know whether the suspicious results belonged to Armstrong. As a result, Armstrong's lawyers demanded an apology from 60 Minutes. Instead of apologizing, CBS News chairman Jeff Fager said the network stood by its report as "truthful, accurate and fair", and added that the suspicious tests which Saugy confirmed to exist have been linked to Armstrong "by a number of international officials".

==== 2012 ====
On February 2, 2012, U.S. federal prosecutors officially dropped their criminal investigation with no charges.

Interviewed by the BBC, Hamilton again insisted that he and Armstrong had routinely doped together. Dismissing the fact that Armstrong had passed numerous drug tests, Hamilton said that he himself had also passed hundreds of drug tests while doping. In the documentary The World According to Lance Armstrong, attorney Jeffrey Tillotson, who represented SCA Promotions in the 2005 lawsuit, stated that he thought that the evidence collected by his legal team showed that Armstrong had been using performance-enhancing drugs since the beginning of his career.

On October 10, 2012, USADA claimed that Armstrong was part of "the most sophisticated, professionalized and successful doping program that sport has ever seen," in advance of issuing its long-awaited report detailing the evidence it acquired. Based on evidence received during the Armstrong investigation and its prosecutions, USADA forwarded its "reasoned decision" document and supporting information to the UCI, the World Anti-Doping Agency (WADA), and the World Triathlon Corporation. Tygart claimed that:

..the evidence shows beyond any doubt that the US Postal Service Pro Cycling Team ran the most sophisticated, professionalized and successful doping program that sport has ever seen. The evidence of the US Postal Service Pro Cycling Team-run scheme is overwhelming and is in excess of 1000 pages, and includes sworn testimony from 26 people, including 15 riders with knowledge of the US Postal Service Team (USPS Team) and its participants' doping activities. The evidence also includes direct documentary evidence including financial payments, emails, scientific data and laboratory test results that further prove the use, possession and distribution of performance enhancing drugs by Lance Armstrong and confirm the disappointing truth about the deceptive activities of the USPS Team, a team that received tens of millions of American taxpayer dollars in funding.

— Travis Tygart, CEO, United States Anti-Doping Agency, October 2012.

In December 2012, Armstrong and his attorney, Tim Herman, held a secret meeting at the Denver offices of former Colorado governor Bill Ritter in an attempt to negotiate a reduction of Armstrong's lifetime ban down to one year. The talks fell apart when Armstrong refused to cooperate with Tygart.

== 1999 Tour de France urine tests ==
On August 23, 2005, L'Équipe, a major French daily sports newspaper, reported on its front page under the headline "le mensonge Armstrong" ("The Armstrong Lie") that six urine samples taken from the cyclist during the prologue and five stages of the 1999 Tour de France, frozen and stored since at "Laboratoire national de dépistage du dopage de Châtenay-Malabry" (LNDD), had tested positive for EPO in recent retesting conducted as part of a research project into EPO testing methods.

Armstrong immediately replied on his website, saying, "Unfortunately, the witch hunt continues and tomorrow's article is nothing short of tabloid journalism. The paper even admits in its own article that the science in question here is faulty and that I have no way to defend myself. They state: 'There will therefore be no counter-exam nor regulatory prosecutions, in a strict sense, since defendant's rights cannot be respected.' I will simply restate what I have said many times: I have never taken performance enhancing drugs."

In October 2008, the AFLD gave Armstrong the opportunity to have samples taken during the 1999 Tours de France retested. Armstrong immediately refused, saying, "the samples have not been maintained properly." Head of AFLD Pierre Bordry stated: "Scientifically there is no problem to analyze these samples – everything is correct" and, "If the analysis is clean it would have been very good for him. But he doesn't want to do it and that's his problem."

In October 2005, in response to calls from the International Olympic Committee (IOC) and the WADA for an independent investigation, the UCI appointed Dutch lawyer Emile Vrijman to investigate the handling of urine tests by the LNDD. Vrijman was head of the Dutch anti-doping agency for ten years; since then he has worked as a defense attorney defending high-profile athletes against doping charges. Vrijman's report cleared Armstrong because of improper handling and testing. The report said tests on urine samples were conducted improperly and fell so short of scientific standards that it was "completely irresponsible" to suggest they "constitute evidence of anything."

The recommendation of the commission's report was no disciplinary action against any rider on the basis of LNDD research. It also called upon the WADA and the LNDD to submit themselves to an investigation by an outside independent authority. The WADA rejected these conclusions stating "The Vrijman report is so lacking in professionalism and objectivity that it borders on farcical." The IOC Ethics Commission subsequently censured Dick Pound, the President of WADA and a member of the IOC, for his statements in the media that suggested wrongdoing by Armstrong.

In April 2009, Ashenden said that "the LNDD absolutely had no way of knowing athlete identity from the sample they're given. They have a number on them, but that's never linked to an athlete's name. The only group that had both the number and the athlete's name is the federation, in this case it was the UCI." He added, "There was only two conceivable ways that synthetic EPO could've gotten into those samples. One, is that Lance Armstrong used EPO during the '99 Tour. The other way it could've got in the urine was if, as Lance Armstrong seems to believe, the laboratory spiked those samples. Now, that's an extraordinary claim, and there's never ever been any evidence the laboratory has ever spiked an athlete's sample, even during the Cold War, where you would've thought there was a real political motive to frame an athlete from a different country. There's never been any suggestion that it happened."

Ashenden's statements are at odds with the findings of the Vrijman report: "According to Mr. Ressiot, the manner in which the LNDD had structured the results table of its report – i.e. listing the sequence of each of the batches, as well as the exact number of urine samples per batch, in the same (chronological) order as the stages of the 1999 Tour de France they were collected at – was already sufficient to allow him to determine the exact stage these urine samples referred to and subsequently the identity of the riders who were tested at that stage." The Vrijman report also says, "Le Monde of July 21 and 23, 1999 reveal that the press knew the contents of original doping forms of the 1999 Tour de France".

== 2013 confession to doping ==
In an interview with Oprah Winfrey that aired on January 17 and 18, 2013, on the Oprah Winfrey Network, Armstrong finally confessed that he has used banned performance-enhancing drugs throughout much of his cycling career, most recently in 2005. He admitted that he used EPO, human growth hormone, and diuretics, and that he had blood doped as well as falsifying documents saying he passed drug tests. Doping helped him for each of his seven Tour de France wins, Armstrong told Winfrey. According to USADA, samples from Armstrong taken in 2009 and 2010 are also "fully consistent with blood manipulation including EPO use and/or blood transfusions". Armstrong is fighting to avoid paying millions of dollars in prize money back.

In a 2016 speech to University of Colorado, Boulder professor Roger A. Pielke Jr.'s Introduction to Sports Governance class, Armstrong stated he began doping in "late Spring of 1995".

== See also ==
- "A Scause for Applause" – a parody of the controversy by South Park
