= Matt Greene (politician) =

American politician

Member of the Wyoming House of Representatives from the 45th district
- In office January 11, 2011 – January 5, 2015
- Preceded by: Seth Carson
- Succeeded by: Charles Pelkey

Personal details
- Party: Republican
- Education: Spring Hill College (BS); University of Wyoming (JD)

Military service
- Branch/service: Wyoming Army National Guard
- Rank: Major

Matthias E. Greene was an American politician and a Republican member of the Wyoming House of Representatives representing District 45 from January 11, 2011, to January 5, 2015.

== Education ==
Greene earned his BS from Spring Hill College and earned a law degree from the University of Wyoming.

== Elections ==
- 2012 Greene was unopposed for the August 21, 2012 Republican Primary, winning with 416 votes, and won the November 6, 2012 General election by 75 votes with 1,781 votes (48.8%) against Democratic nominee Tony Mendoza.
- 2010 Challenging incumbent Democratic Representative Seth Carson for the District 45 seat, Greene was unopposed for the August 17, 2010 Republican Primary, winning with 520 votes, and won the November 2, 2010 General election with 1,383 votes (54.0%) against Carson.
