= KP: The Autobiography =

2014 biography by David Walsh

- Author: Kevin Pietersen, David Walsh
- Language: English
- Subject: Autobiography
- Genre: Autobiography
- Publisher: Sphere
- Publication date: 9 October 2014
- Publication place: United Kingdom
- Media type: Print (Hardcover), E-book
- Pages: 336
- ISBN: 978-0751557541

KP: The Autobiography is the autobiography of England cricketer Kevin Pietersen, ghost written by Irish sports journalist David Walsh. It was scheduled to be released on 9 October 2014. The book will summarise incidents from Pietersen's early life in South Africa and his career with the England team, including his sacking from the England squad in February 2014.
