= Wyoming's 45th House of Representatives district =

American legislative district

Wyoming's 45th State House of Representatives district
- Wyoming's 45th House of Representatives district as of 2022
Representative
| Karlee Provenza; D–Laramie |
- Demographics: 77% White; 1% Black; 14% Hispanic; 4% Asian; 1% Native American; 3% Multiracial
- Population (2022): 9,602

Wyoming's 45th House of Representatives district is one of 62 districts in the Wyoming House of Representatives. The district encompasses part of Albany County. It is represented by Democratic Representative Karlee Provenza of Laramie.

In 1992, the state of Wyoming switched from electing state legislators by county to a district-based system.

== List of members representing the district ==
| Representative | Party | Term | Note |
|---|---|---|---|
| Wende Barker | Democratic | 1993 – 1999 | Elected in 1992. Re-elected in 1994. Re-elected in 1996. |
| Lorna Johnson | Democratic | 1999 – 2005 | Elected in 1998. Re-elected in 2000. Re-elected in 2002. |
| Kevin A. White | Republican | 2005 – 2009 | Elected in 2004. Re-elected in 2006. |
| Seth Carson | Democratic | 2009 – 2011 | Elected in 2008. |
| Matt Greene | Republican | 2011 – 2015 | Elected in 2010. Re-elected in 2012. |
| Charles Pelkey | Democratic | 2015 – 2021 | Elected in 2014. Re-elected in 2016. Re-elected in 2018. |
| Karlee Provenza | Democratic | 2021 – present | Elected in 2020. Re-elected in 2022. Re-elected in 2024. |

== Recent election results ==
=== 2014 ===
House district 45 general election
| Party | Candidate | Votes | % |
|---|---|---|---|
| Democratic | Charles Pelkey | 1,115 | 52.76% |
| Republican | C. J. Young | 989 | 46.80% |
| Write-ins | | 9 | 0.42% |
| Total votes | | 2,113 | 100.0% |
| Invalid or blank votes | | 116 | |
| Democratic gain from Republican | | | |

=== 2016 ===
House district 45 general election
| Party | Candidate | Votes | % |
|---|---|---|---|
| Democratic | Charles Pelkey (incumbent) | 1,894 | 52.17% |
| Republican | Tom Schmit | 1,728 | 47.60% |
| Write-ins | | 8 | 0.22% |
| Total votes | | 3,630 | 100.0% |
| Invalid or blank votes | | 123 | |
| Democratic hold | | | |

=== 2018 ===
House district 45 general election
| Party | Candidate | Votes | % |
|---|---|---|---|
| Democratic | Charles Pelkey (incumbent) | 1,784 | 59.96% |
| Republican | Roxie Jackson Hensley | 1,185 | 39.83% |
| Write-ins | | 6 | 0.20% |
| Total votes | | 2,975 | 100.0% |
| Invalid or blank votes | | 155 | |
| Democratic hold | | | |

=== 2020 ===
House district 45 general election
| Party | Candidate | Votes | % |
|---|---|---|---|
| Democratic | Karlee Provenza | 2,043 | 51.86% |
| Republican | Roxie Hensley | 1,883 | 47.80% |
| Write-ins | | 13 | 0.33% |
| Total votes | | 3,939 | 100.0% |
| Invalid or blank votes | | 114 | |
| Democratic hold | | | |

=== 2022 ===
House district 45 general election
| Party | Candidate | Votes | % |
|---|---|---|---|
| Democratic | Karlee Provenza (incumbent) | 2,151 | 93.93% |
| Write-ins | | 139 | 6.06% |
| Total votes | | 2,290 | 100.0% |
| Invalid or blank votes | | 542 | |
| Democratic hold | | | |

=== 2024 ===
House district 45 general election
| Party | Candidate | Votes | % |
|---|---|---|---|
| Democratic | Karlee Provenza (incumbent) | 2,493 | 62.57% |
| Republican | Paul Crouch | 1,477 | 37.07% |
| Write-ins | | 14 | 0.35% |
| Total votes | | 3,984 | 100.0% |
| Invalid or blank votes | | 158 | |
| Democratic hold | | | |

== Historical district boundaries ==
| Map | Description | Apportionment Plan | Notes |
|---|---|---|---|
| | Albany County (part) | 1992 Apportionment Plan | |
| | Albany County (part) | 2002 Apportionment Plan | |
| | Albany County (part) | 2012 Apportionment Plan | |
