= Wende Barker =

Wyoming politician

Member of the Wyoming House of Representatives from the 45th district
- In office 1993–1998
- Preceded by: Constituency established
- Succeeded by: Lorna Johnson

Personal details
- Party: Democratic

Wende Barker is an American Democratic politician from Laramie, Wyoming. She represented the 45th district in the Wyoming House of Representatives from 1993 to 1998.
