= L.A. Confidentiel =

2004 book by Pierre Ballester and David Walsh

- Cover
- Author: Pierre Ballester; David Walsh
- Original title: L.A. Confidentiel: Les secrets de Lance Armstrong
- Subject: Lance Armstrong
- Publisher: La Martinière
- Publication date: 2004
- Pages: 373
- ISBN: 2846751307

L.A. Confidentiel: Les secrets de Lance Armstrong (L.A. Confidential: Lance Armstrong's Secrets) is a book by sports journalist Pierre Ballester and The Sunday Times sports correspondent David Walsh. Only published in French, it contains circumstantial evidence that cyclist Lance Armstrong had used performance-enhancing drugs before its publication.

A key witness for the authors was Emma O'Reilly, masseuse and soigneur for Armstrong and his teammates. In the book, she reveals that she had taken clandestine trips to pick up and drop off what she concluded were doping products.

Many of the incidents and allegations in the book were later featured in the USADA 2012 report on the US Postal Service cycling team, which led to Armstrong being stripped of most of his titles by the UCI. Many 2012 news reports would feature O'Reilly and others previously reported on in the book.

== Process ==
In the mid-1990s, Walsh had been a fan of Lance. Walsh claims that what first raised doubts in his mind about Armstrong was his bullying of Christophe Bassons at the 1999 Tour de France.

In April 2001 he was granted an interview with Armstrong. It left Armstrong angry.

In 2003 Walsh contacted former US Postal soigneur and masseuse Emma O'Reilly. She had been reluctant to talk to the press for years out of loyalty to Armstrong and the team. She claimed that she was motivated to cooperate with Walsh after she came to believe that several riders had died of blood doping. O'Reilly was paid 5,000 pounds, after reviewing several transcripts and chapter drafts and doing PR for the book for Walsh.

== Defamation lawsuits ==
Armstrong denied the claims. He and his lawyers filed lawsuits in various countries against the book's authors and the publisher Editions de la Martiniere, as well as against newspaper The Sunday Times which referenced the book, and the publishers of magazine L'Express which printed excerpts. His UK lawyers also told "every UK paper and broadcaster" to not re-state what was in the book. Armstrong also sued Emma O'Reilly.

Armstrong's lawyers in France included Donald Manasse and Christian Charrière-Bournazel. In the UK he retained the Schillings firm, where Gideon Benaim and Matthew Himsworth worked on his libel cases.

Armstrong said the following at a news conference in 2004 regarding the suits:

... we can't really tolerate it anymore, and we're sick and tired of the allegations ... We'll do everything we can to fight them. ... It's unfortunate. It's a few journalists who took this on as a personal mission. Again, enough is enough.

Armstrong's lawyers first asked the French courts for an "emergency ruling" to insert a denial into the book, as the book was to come out shortly before the 2004 Tour de France. Judge Catherine Bezio denied the request. According to the Associated Press, the "judge ... called Armstrong's request an "abuse" of the legal system".

Armstrong then sued the UK newspaper The Sunday Times under English libel law because it published an article referencing the book. The article was ruled in pre-trial to have conveyed the impression that Armstrong was guilty of doping.

Armstrong's lawyers also sued the publisher in a French court regarding eight passages which were claimed to violate French defamation law. They wanted the passages removed or the book pulled from shelves.

When Bob Hamman, president of Dallas insurer SCA Promotions, read the book, he announced that his company would not pay $5 million promised to Armstrong for winning his sixth tour until he investigated the allegations. However, an arbitration panel ruled that Hamman had to pay.

In 2006 the lawsuits came to an end. Armstrong reached an out-of-court settlement for a large sum of money with The Sunday Times, which issued an apologetic statement. Emma O'Reilly didn't have to pay, although the emotional toll on her was severe. The French defamation lawsuit was dropped in 2006, which Armstrong's lawyers claimed was due to him being already "vindicated on three different occasions" regarding the allegations. This was referring to UCI's Vrijman report which exonerated Armstrong, the arbitration settlement with SCA, and the aforementioned The Sunday Times settlement.

Ultimately, however, the book proved to be the beginning of the end for Armstrong. While Hamman realized he would likely lose, he believed that the testimony would provide strong circumstantial evidence that Armstrong had indeed doped—strong enough that sporting authorities would be forced to launch an investigation of their own. His hunch was right; officials from the United States Anti-Doping Agency (USADA) asked to review the evidence Hamman had gleaned. Six years later, USADA charged Armstrong with doping. Armstrong opted not to contest the charges, claiming the process was too one-sided. As a result, he was banned from competing in any sport whose national or international federation followed the World Anti-Doping Code—effectively ending his competitive career.

In October 2012, after USADA released its report on Armstrong's doping operation, The Sunday Times stated it might attempt to recover the money it lost in the suit, and might sue Armstrong for fraud. On October 22, 2012, after the UCI accepted USADA's report, SCA announced it would attempt to recover the money it lost in its arbitration settlement with Armstrong.
