= Lorna Johnson =

Wyoming politician

Member of the Wyoming House of Representatives from the 45th district
- In office 1999–2004
- Preceded by: Wende Barker
- Succeeded by: Kevin A. White

Personal details
- Party: Democratic

Lorna Johnson is an American Democratic politician from Laramie, Albany County, Wyoming. She represented the 45th district in the Wyoming House of Representatives from 1999 to 2004. She is Jewish.
