= Kevin Pietersen =

English cricketer (born 1980)

Kevin Pietersen MBE
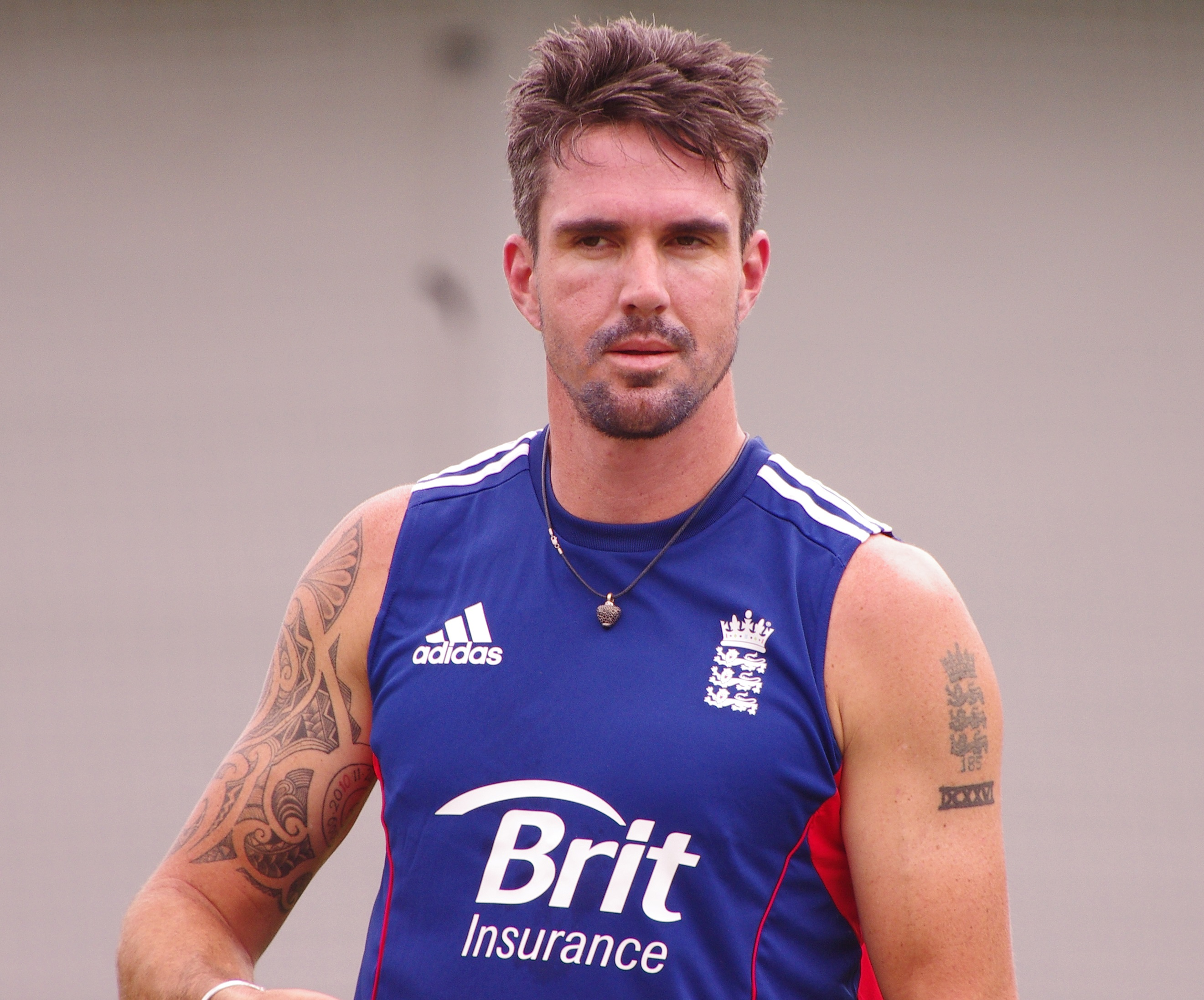
- Pietersen in 2014

Personal information
- Full name: Kevin Peter Pietersen
- Born: 27 June 1980 (age 46); Pietermaritzburg, South Africa
- Nickname: KP
- Height: 1.93 m (6 ft 4 in)
- Batting: Right-handed
- Bowling: Right arm off break
- Role: Top-order batter

International information
- National side: England (2004–2014)
- Test debut (cap 626): 21 July 2005 v Australia
- Last Test: 3 January 2014 v Australia
- ODI debut (cap 185): 28 November 2004 v Zimbabwe
- Last ODI: 16 September 2013 v Australia
- ODI shirt no.: 24
- T20I debut (cap 7): 13 June 2005 v Australia
- Last T20I: 27 June 2013 v New Zealand
- T20I shirt no.: 24

Domestic team information
- Years: Team
- 1997/98: Natal B (squad no. 24)
- 1998/99: KwaZulu Natal B (squad no. 24)
- 1998/99–1999/00: KwaZulu Natal (squad no. 24)
- 2001–2004: Nottinghamshire (squad no. 24)
- 2004: Marylebone Cricket Club
- 2005–2010: Hampshire (squad no. 24)
- 2009–2010: Royal Challengers Bangalore (squad no. 24)
- 2010–2017: Surrey (squad no. 24)
- 2010/11: Dolphins
- 2012–2014: Delhi Daredevils (squad no. 24)
- 2014–2015: St Lucia Stars (squad no. 24)
- 2014/15–2017/18: Melbourne Stars (squad no. 24)
- 2015/16–2016/17: Dolphins (squad no. 24)
- 2016–2018: Quetta Gladiators (squad no. 24)
- 2016: Rising Pune Supergiants (squad no. 24)

Career statistics
Competition	Test	ODI	T20I	FC
Matches	104	136	37	253
Runs scored	8,181	4,440	1,176	16,522
Batting average	47.28	40.73	37.94	49.76
100s/50s	23/35	9/25	0/7	50/71
Top score	227	130	79	355*
Balls bowled	1,311	400	30	6,443
Wickets	10	7	1	73
Bowling average	88.60	52.86	53.00	51.50
5 wickets in innings	0	0	0	0
10 wickets in match	0	0	0	0
Best bowling	3/52	2/22	1/27	4/31
Catches/stumpings	62/–	40/–	14/–	152/–
Medal record
Men's Cricket
Representing England
T20 World Cup
Winner	2010 West Indies
- Source: ESPNcricinfo, 4 May 2019

Kevin Peter Pietersen MBE (born 27 June 1980) is a former England international cricketer. He is regarded as one of England's greatest ever batsmen and renowned for his competitive, and often controversial, nature. He was a right-handed batsman and occasional off spin bowler who played in all three formats for England between 2004 and 2014, which included a brief tenure as captain. He won the Player of the Series award for his performances in 2010 International Cricket Council (ICC) World Twenty20 which helped England to win their maiden ICC trophy.

Pietersen was born to an Afrikaner father and English mother in South Africa. He made his first-class debut for Natal in 1997 and moved to England in 2000, after voicing his displeasure at what he said was the racial quota system in South African cricket. Being of English ancestry, Pietersen was eligible for the England team so long as he first served a four-year qualifying period in English county cricket. He was called up by England almost immediately after he completed four years with Nottinghamshire. He made his international debut in the One Day International (ODI) match against Zimbabwe in 2004 and his Test match debut in the 2005 Ashes series against Australia.

Pietersen left Nottinghamshire for Hampshire in 2005, but the England team's subsequent reliance on him resulted in Pietersen making only a single first-class appearance for Hampshire between 2005 and 2010. In June 2010, Pietersen announced his wish to leave Hampshire; he joined Surrey on loan for the remainder of the season, then moved permanently in 2011.

Pietersen was captain of the England Test and ODI teams from 4 August 2008 to 7 January 2009, but resigned after just three Tests and nine ODIs following a dispute with the England coach Peter Moores, who was sacked the same day. Pietersen's relationship with the England Cricket Board (ECB) never fully recovered. This came to a head in 2012 when, after a disagreement over his schedule, Pietersen announced his retirement from all forms of international limited-overs cricket on 31 May. Although he later retracted his retirement, his relationship with both the ECB and his team-mates soured during the series against South Africa, and he was dropped for the final Test of that series. Pietersen last played for England in the 2013–14 Ashes and subsequent ODIs, after which he was informed that he was no longer being considered for international selection.

He also played for the Melbourne Stars in the Big Bash League (BBL) until the end of BBL|07 (seventh season), the Quetta Gladiators in the Pakistan Super League as well as the Hollywoodbets Dolphins in the CSA T20 Challenge. He was also signed by the Rising Pune Supergiants for the 2016 season of the Indian Premier League.

Pietersen is one of the fastest batsmen to reach 1,000 ODI runs and still holds the record for being the fastest player to cross 2,000 runs in ODI cricket. He has the second-highest run total from his first 25 Tests, behind only Sir Don Bradman of Australia, and was the fastest player, in terms of days, to reach 4,000, 5,000 and 7,000 Test runs. He became only the third English batsman to top the ICC ODI rankings, doing so in March 2007. In July 2008, after a century against South Africa, The Times called him "the most complete batsman in cricket" and in 2012 The Guardian called him "England's greatest modern batsman". On the occasion of England's 1000th Test in August 2018, he was named in the country's greatest Test XI by the ECB.

== Early and personal life ==
Pietersen was born on 27 June 1980 in Pietermaritzburg, in the Natal Province of South Africa, to an English mother, Penny, and an Afrikaner father, Jannie. Pietersen had a strict and disciplined childhood, along with his three brothers Tony, Greg and Bryan; he learned valuable lessons from this "fantastic" approach to parenting, and said: "Discipline is good. It taught me that I didn't always have to have what I wanted; that what I needed was different from what I wanted." Bryan played club and second XI cricket in England. A forearm injury at 11 years old meant Pietersen could not play rugby, but he played hockey, tennis and squash, which also made his right arm very strong for batting.

Pietersen attended Maritzburg College in Pietermaritzburg, and made his first-class cricket debut for Natal's B team in 1997, aged 17, where he was regarded predominantly as an off spin bowler and a hard-hitting lower-order batsman. After two seasons, he moved to England for a five-month spell as the overseas player for club team Cannock CC, helping them win the Birmingham and District Premier League in 2000. This first spell away from home did not leave him with fond memories for England, in particular "those horrible Black Country accents" referring to a dialect of the West Midlands, living in a single room above a squash court, and working in the club bar. However, he returned to newly renamed KwaZulu Natal team a better cricketer; a lack of opportunities to bowl had improved his batting.

Having seen Pietersen play at a school cricket festival, Clive Rice invited him to sign for Nottinghamshire County Cricket Club. Pietersen accepted without hesitation, keen to make the most of top-class cricket under a coach for whom he had the utmost admiration. He did not at this stage contemplate forsaking his nation; it had not yet occurred to him that the decision would have to be taken.

Pietersen is widely portrayed in the media as having a self-assured personality, described by Geoffrey Boycott as being "cocky and confident". Former England test captain Michael Vaughan counters this, saying, "KP is not a confident person. He obviously has great belief in his ability but that's not quite the same thing... And I know KP wants to be loved. I try to text him and talk to him as often as I can because I know he is insecure." He has been noted for unusual haircuts, with his peroxide blonde-dyed streak of hair along the middle of his head during the 2005 Ashes series being described as a "dead skunk" look. During the 2006–07 Ashes tour, the Australian team, noted for their efforts to dominate opponents psychologically, dubbed him "The Ego", or "FIGJAM" (Fuck I'm Good, Just Ask Me). Other nicknames include "KP", "Kelves", "Kev" and "Kapes".

Pietersen married Liberty X singer Jessica Taylor on 29 December 2007 at St Andrew's Church in Castle Combe, Wiltshire, with former England team-mate Darren Gough acting as best man.

Jessica gave birth to their first child, a son, in 2010. Pietersen travelled back from touring with the England team in Barbados and arrived at the hospital just in time for the birth. Their second child, a daughter, was born in 2015, and Pietersen took leave from playing for the Melbourne Stars in the Big Bash League in Australia to be present for the birth.

Pietersen considers South Africa his first home and England his second home, and the family split their time between Surrey and the Sabie River.

== Domestic career ==
=== Early years in South Africa ===
He impressed members of Nasser Hussain's England team when playing for KwaZulu Natal in 1999; he took four top-order wickets and, despite batting at number nine, scored 61 not out from 57 balls, hitting four sixes. Hussain then recommended that Pietersen secure a contract with an English county team.

Despite the praise from the England team, Pietersen claimed he was dropped from the Natal first team. Pietersen felt that this was due to the country's racial quota system, in which provincial teams were required to have at least four black players. Pietersen's view was that players should be judged on merit, and described it as "heartbreaking" when he was left out of the team, although he later reflected "it turned out it was the best thing that could have happened". However, in the 1999-2000 Supersport series, from four matches Pietersen only averaged 10.75 with the bat, and took 10 wickets at an expensive 37.50, which were not enough to cement his place in the KwaZulu Natal team. Nonetheless, Pietersen has since firmly criticised the quota system, which he feels forced him out of the country of his birth. He has also criticised Graeme Smith, who became captain of the South African team in 2003, calling him "an absolute muppet, childish and strange" and that his behaviour "leaves a lot to be desired". Smith opposed this, saying, "I'm patriotic about my country, and that's why I don't like Kevin Pietersen. The only reason that Kevin and I have never had a relationship is because he slated South Africa". Pietersen's outspoken views published in his autobiography, Crossing the Boundary, in September 2006, and in an interview for the South African edition of GQ magazine, led to unsuccessful calls for an ICC investigation regarding bringing the game into disrepute.

=== English domestic career ===
==== Nottinghamshire ====
In 2000, Nottinghamshire coach Clive Rice, who had seen Pietersen play in 1997 in South Africa at a schools week, heard that Pietersen was playing club cricket for the Cannock Cricket Club and offered him a three-year contract to play for the county. His maiden first-class century came on his Nottinghamshire debut against Loughborough UCCE. In his first season, he made 1,275 runs with an impressive batting average of 57.95, including 218 not out in an unbroken sixth-wicket stand of 352 with John Morris at Derby in July, after having been out lbw for a duck in the first innings. These performances led to praise in the Wisden Cricketers' Almanack: "If he can maintain his first season's form, the name of Pietersen should be pencilled in for future Test squads." This form did indeed continue into the following year: he made another unbeaten double-century, against Middlesex, taking part in a partnership of 316 for the fourth wicket with Darren Bicknell. This period proved to be a purple patch for the batsman, scoring four consecutive centuries (254 not out, 122, 147 and 116) in one week in August.

In 2003, Pietersen scored 1,546 first-class runs, and 764 runs in limited overs cricket. He was selected for the 2003/04 ECB National Academy tour of India, and had a successful tour scoring 523 runs including three centuries in his six first-class innings to record an average of 104.60, and making 131 in a one-day match against India A in Bangalore.

After Nottinghamshire were relegated in 2003, Pietersen requested a release from his contract, saying "I haven't been happy for a while....The pitch at Trent Bridge has been one of my problems... I could have done so much better if the wicket had been good." This led to a public row with club captain Jason Gallian, where Gallian allegedly threw Pietersen's kit off the Trent Bridge balcony and broke his bat:

During the game I told the captain that I was not happy and that I wanted to leave. After the game we spoke in the dressing room and then I went to have dinner. I got a call saying the captain had trashed my equipment. I was told the captain had said, 'if he does not want to play for Notts he can f*** off.' I have not spoken to Gallian since, nor have I received an apology.

Pietersen was made to honour the last year of his contract at Nottinghamshire, but "didn't enjoy it at all".

==== Hampshire ====
In October 2004, he joined Hampshire under the captaincy of Shane Warne. After becoming a regular in the national team, Pietersen rarely got an opportunity to play domestic cricket. Having an England "central contract" meant that Pietersen was only released to play for Hampshire at the discretion of the national coach. After being left out of the national team to face Bangladesh in May 2005, Pietersen had several good innings in the English County Championship, including two centuries. He only played twice for the county in 2006, and appeared just once in 2007, with an unbeaten 66 against Ireland. Pietersen's last first-class match for Hampshire came in the 2008 County Championship against Somerset, where he scored 100 runs in Hampshire's first innings, and following the birth of his son, a desire to stay in London led to him announcing he would leave Hampshire at the end of the 2010 season.

==== Surrey ====
Pietersen then joined Surrey on loan from Hampshire for the remainder of the 2010 English county cricket season. He scored a century in his first Clydesdale Bank 40 appearance against Sussex, with 116 off 105 deliveries. It was his first limited overs century since 2008, and his first century of any kind since March 2009. He subsequently signed permanently for Surrey from the 2011 season onwards. Pietersen had also rejoined his old team in South Africa, the Dolphins, for a short stint in October 2010.

In early 2015, Pietersen withdrew from the initial stages of the 2015 Indian Premier League, instead opting to play County Championship matches, with the aim of playing for England again. After a meeting with Andrew Strauss, the new Director of Cricket for England, whilst not out on 326 overnight against Leicestershire, during which Strauss rejected any notions of a return for Pietersen, Pietersen resumed his innings the following day, scoring his highest first-class score of 355*.

On 19 July 2017 Pietersen returned to English domestic cricket when he joined Surrey for the NatWest t20 Blast. He scored 52 runs, including four consecutive sixes. He was replaced by a substitute fielder in the second innings. On 29 July Pietersen announced that he had decided to donate all his earnings towards rhino conservation efforts. After being injured for the majority of the season, making only one further T20 appearance, Pietersen announced that he would leave Surrey, and English cricket as a whole, following the club's loss in the quarter finals to Birmingham Bears.

=== Overseas franchise cricket ===
==== Indian Premier League ====
Kevin Pietersen made his Indian Premier League debut in 2009 with the Royal Challengers Bangalore, signing for a then-record fee of US$1.5 million. In six matches, he scored 93 runs at an average of 15.50 and took four wickets at a strike rate of 19.50 with an economy rate of 6.53.

In February 2014, Delhi Daredevils of Indian Premier League bought Pietersen for US$1.5 million for the 2014 Indian Premier League season, and he captained the team for that season. Pietersen had previously played for the Delhi Daredevils during the 2012 Indian Premier League Season and had his most successful IPL season by scoring 305 runs at a strike rate of 147, which included a victorious knock of 103*.

In the 2015 Indian Premier League auction, Pietersen was bought by Sunrisers Hyderabad for 2 Crore Rupees. However, Pietersen was released by Sunrisers Hyderabad prior to the start of the tournament, although he could play in the later stages of the 2015 Indian Premier League season. Plans to rejoin Hyderabad towards the end of the competition were curtailed due to injury.

In IPL 2025, he was appointed mentor of the Delhi Capitals.

==== Melbourne Stars ====
Pietersen was signed by the Melbourne Stars in 2014–15 Big Bash League season, with a contract for 2 years; he was seen as a "big hit" for the 2014–15 Big Bash League season. On 18 December 2014, Kevin Pietersen played his first match in 2014–15 Big Bash League season as the no.3 batsmen, and scored 66 runs off 46 balls. In 2016, he helped the team beat two-time defending champion Perth Scorchers and advance to their first Grand Final and their fifth consecutive Finals series appearances. Pietersen also signed a two-year extension that took him through to the 2017–18 season.

==== Caribbean Premier League ====
Pietersen also played T20 cricket in the Caribbean Premier League, having signed for St Lucia Zouks for the 2014 Caribbean Premier League season.

==== Legends League Cricket ====
In Legends League Cricket he is playing for India Capitals.

=== Bicentenary celebration match ===
In July 2014, he played for the Rest of the World team in the Bicentenary Celebration match at Lord's.

On 6 January 2018 Pietersen announced he would retire from all forms of cricket at the end of the 2018 season. In 2020, Pietersen came back and played in the Ultimate Cricket Challenge.

== International career ==
=== England debut ===
Pietersen is eligible to play for England as he has an English mother. After a qualifying period of four years playing at English county level, he was called up almost immediately for his international debut against Zimbabwe in 2004.

The tour of Zimbabwe caused several players to voice their concerns about the Robert Mugabe regime, the security issues in the country and the standard of the Zimbabwean team. Steve Harmison was the first to boycott the tour for "political and sporting reasons", and all-rounder Andrew Flintoff was reported to be considering taking a moral stand himself. The England Chairman of Selectors David Graveney denied that the selectors would leave out players unhappy with touring Zimbabwe and would put their absences down to injury. Flintoff was, however, "rested" and Pietersen rushed into the squad "at the earliest opportunity". In the five match ODI series, Pietersen batted in three innings which included a score of 77 not out; he finished the series with an average of 104.00 as England won the series 4–0.

=== Success in South Africa ===
Pietersen was upset not to be initially in the squad to tour South Africa. With Flintoff withdrawing due to injury, Pietersen was recalled to the squad, and cemented his place in the first team with 97 off 84 balls in the warm-up match against South Africa A, in the face of a hostile crowd. Throughout the tour, Pietersen was subjected to a barrage of abuse from the South African crowd, who regarded him somewhat like a traitor. He said:

I knew I was going to cop a lot of stick but it will be like water off a duck's back...I expected stick at the start of the innings, and I'm sure it will carry on through the whole series. But I just sat back and laughed at the opposition, with their swearing and 'traitor' remarks... some of them can hardly speak English. My affiliation is with England. In fact, I'm starting to speak too much like Darren Gough... In fact, I'm going to get one of Gough's tattoos with three lions and my number underneath...No one can say I'm not English.

Pietersen scored a 96-ball 108 not out in the tied second ODI at Bloemfontein, after which the crowd turned their backs on him as he returned to the pavilion. This score set his ODI average at an incredible record 234.00. He made 75 at Cape Town, then at East London Pietersen made an unbeaten 100 from only 69 balls, the fastest century by an England player in a one-day match, although England still lost by eight runs. In the final game at Centurion Park, Pietersen came to the wicket at 32/3 and scored 116, but again could not prevent a defeat. Pietersen ended the series, which England lost 4–1, with 454 runs in five innings, and the Player of the Series award. By the end of the series, the South African crowds had generally replaced hostility with respect for Pietersen, his final century being awarded a standing ovation.

Despite press speculation, Pietersen was not picked for the Tests against Bangladesh—his early season form being dogged by a foot injury—but with his county form improving, he was selected for the Twenty20 match against Australia at Southampton, making 34 from 18 balls and taking three catches as England won by 100 runs. He was awarded 'man of the match'.

In the triangular ODI series against Australia and Bangladesh, Pietersen did not get to bat in the first match at The Oval as England won by 10 wickets, but scored 91 off 65 balls in the match in Bristol against Australia. In the remainder of the triangular series, Pietersen scored quickly, although without other half-centuries. In the final of the NatWest Series, he only made 6 as he finished the seven-match series with a total of 278 runs at an average of 46.33. Pietersen's performances sparked speculation over whether he would be brought into the Test team for The Ashes later in the summer. Later in July, Pietersen played in all three matches of the (ODI) NatWest Challenge against Australia. In the final match he was the top scorer for England with 74 runs; however, he was forced off the field in the third over of Australia's reply with a groin injury.

=== 2005 Ashes triumph ===
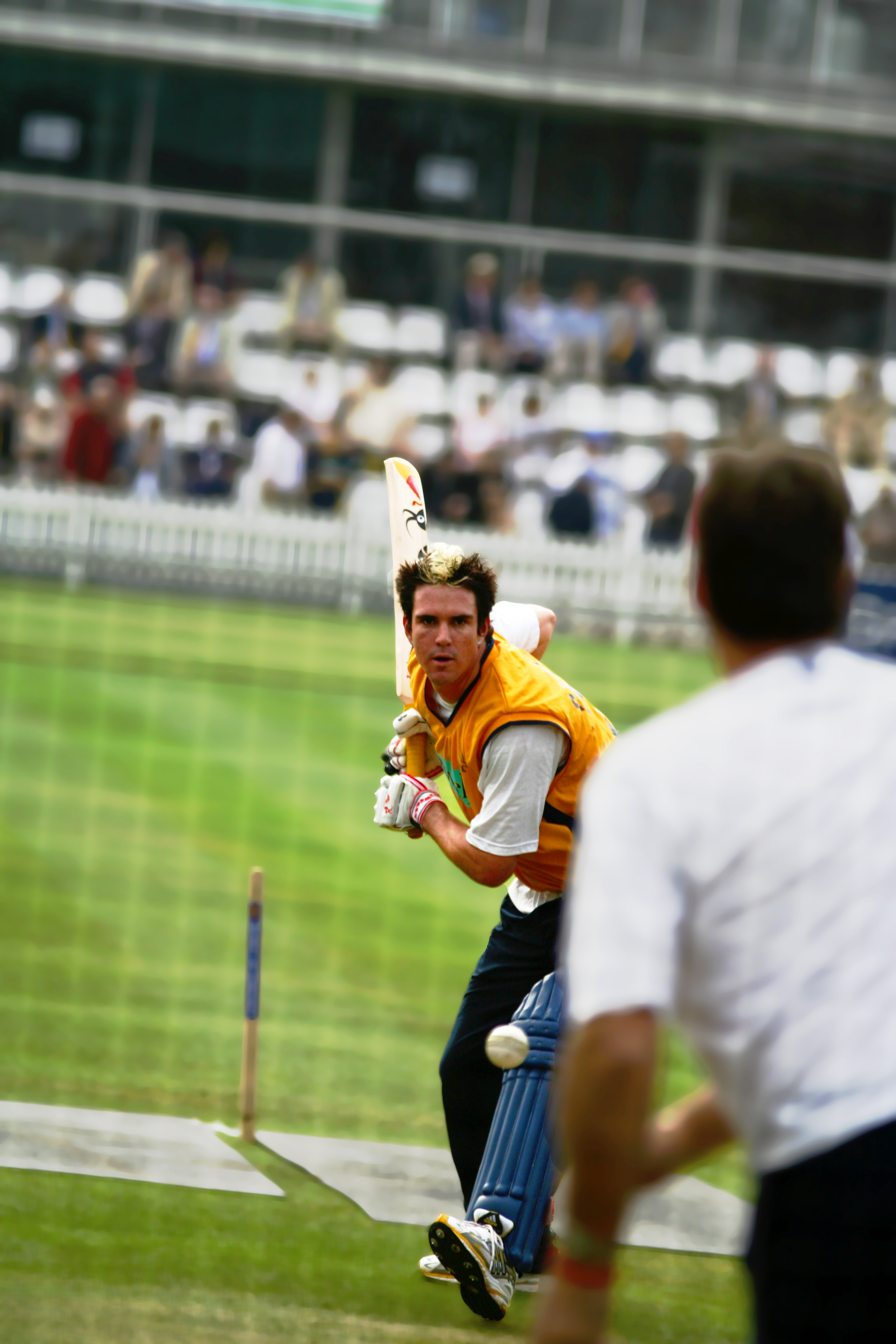
Pietersen warming up in the nets at Lord's in September 2005.

Speculation over when Pietersen would play for the Test team was ended in July with the announcement by the England chairman of selectors, David Graveney, that Pietersen had been selected ahead of Graham Thorpe. He made his debut in the first Ashes Test at Lord's, becoming the 626th player to play for the national team. He came into bat at 18–3 and he made 57 on debut in his first innings. In the second innings, he similarly came in after a batting collapse and finished making a second half-century and finished the innings on 64 not out, becoming only the fourth player to top score in both innings on debut for England, the eighth England player to score a half-century in each innings on his debut, and the third cricketer to do so at Lord's. England were thrashed by 239 runs before moving onto Edgbaston where he came in a more comfortable position scoring 71 in the first innings. He had a good partnership with Andrew Flintoff where the pair put on 103 very quickly. He made 20 in the second innings coming in at 31–4. He was involved in two controversial decisions: he gloved his first ball from Brett Lee, but the umpire turned down the appeal, and he was later given out to a ball from Shane Warne that hit his pad then elbow before being caught by Adam Gilchrist. England won the match by two runs.

In the drawn third Test, Pietersen had his first quiet match when he scored 21 in the first innings, getting caught on the boundary. Then, with England looking to push on he was dismissed lbw by Glenn McGrath for a golden duck. In the fourth test, at his former home ground Trent Bridge, he scored 45 in the first innings after facing 108 balls looking to build a big score. In the second innings chasing 129 to win, he was in at 57–4 when he scored 23 in a decent partnership again with Flintoff. He was dismissed when he was caught behind wafting at a ball outside off stump. However, England won and went 2–1 up. Under pressure to post a large score in the final Test at The Oval, Pietersen did not contribute significantly in the first innings; he scored 14 as he was bowled by Shane Warne for the first time in his Test career . In the second innings, Pietersen was dropped on 0 by a combination of Gilchrist and Hayden, on 15 by his Hampshire colleague Shane Warne and after reaching fifty on 60 by Shaun Tait. He reached his maiden test century with a driven four off the bowling of Tait before making 158, eventually being dismissed by Glenn McGrath. This innings helped to secure the return of the Ashes to England. His innings included seven sixes, breaking Ian Botham's record for the most sixes by an English player in an Ashes innings. Pietersen was named Man of the Match for his efforts, and finished the series as top scorer, with 473 runs over the five Tests, an average of 52.55, which also was the highest in the series. However, he had a less successful series in the field, dropping six catches in the five Tests, a point he made wryly when questioned about the Australians dropping him three times on the final day. Pietersen was given an ECB central contract to reflect his place in the national team.

=== 2005–06 winter tour ===
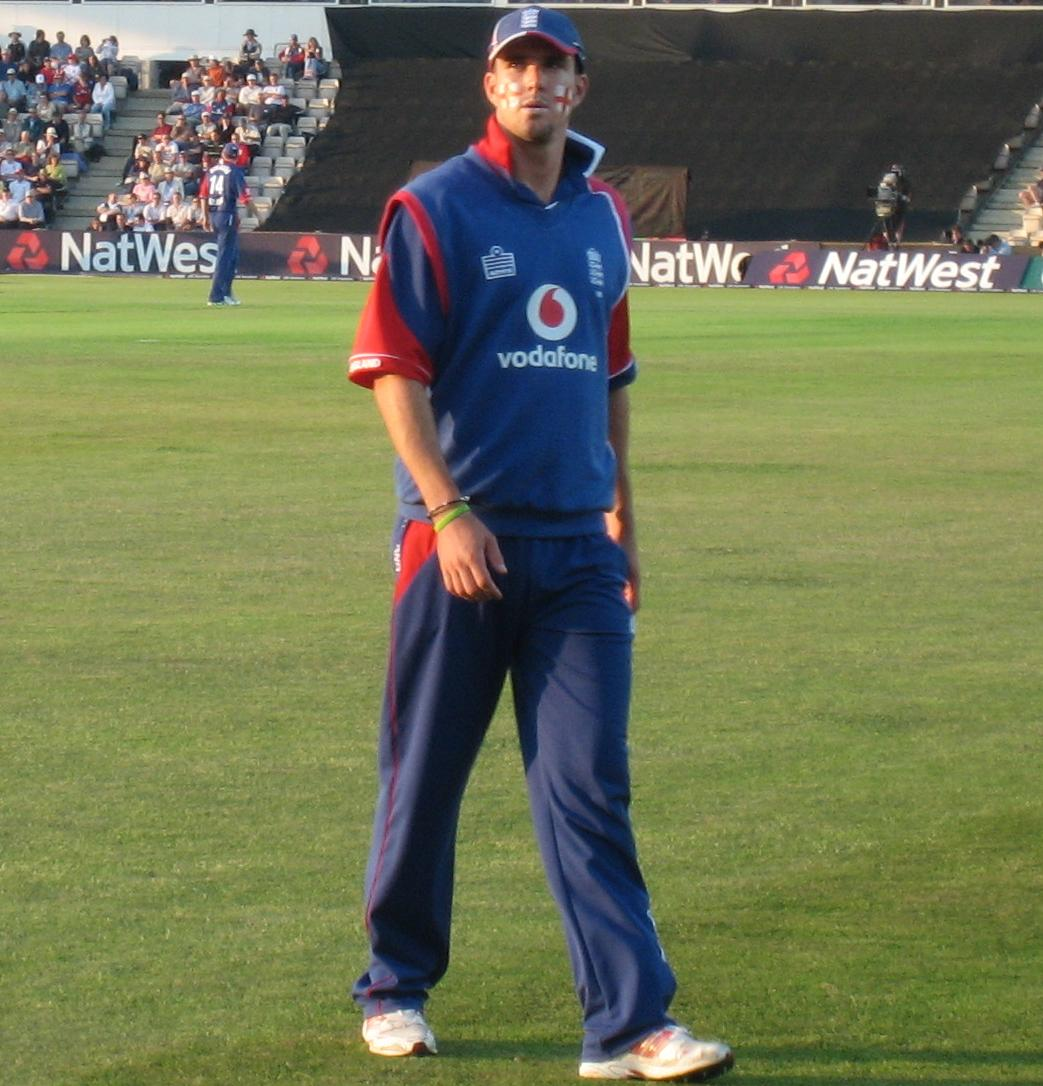
Kevin Pietersen in Twenty20 action in 2006

Pietersen had a less successful time in the three Test matches against Pakistan, which England lost 2–0. He made little impact in the first and third test. His first Test match innings since his match winning 158 against Australia was brief as he was caught at short leg for 5. In the second innings, he was criticised for his dismissal. Chasing just 198, he was caught behind after a horrible slog on 19 as England went on to lose by 22 runs. In the third test, he made 34 before edging behind in the first innings. With England in difficulty, Pietersen edged Danish Kaneria to short leg when only on one, as England were to be defeated by an innings. He fared better in the second, however, making his second Test century in the first innings. He brought up his hundred with a six before next ball, he top-edged a pull and was out. In the next innings, with England needing to bat out a draw, England were 20–4 but he made 42 to help England get the draw. He was also performing well in the one-day series with two explosive innings of 56 from 39 balls to help England win the first ODI, and 28 from 27 balls in the second. The quick-scoring innings in the second ODI was to be Pietersen's last on the tour. A rib injury sustained in the first ODI proved too painful throughout the second, and Pietersen returned to England to recover fully for the tour of India.

In March 2006, Pietersen played in the three Tests against India, which England drew 1–1. In the first innings on 15, another rash shot brought his downfall. He pulled a ball from Sreesanth onto his stumps. His 87 in the second innings of the first match came during England's acceleration period, helping push the required target over 300. England then declared overnight, and India successfully batted out the final day to secure a draw. This half-century was followed by another in the first innings of the second Test. Again, he gave his wicket away on 64 when he offered Munaf Patel a return catch. The second innings was not so good, facing just 13 balls before being given out caught behind off a Harbhajan Singh delivery. The unhappy Pietersen was later fined 30 percent of his match fee for shaking his head and showing signs of dissent. Replays demonstrated that the ball that had dismissed him had brushed his forearm, not his glove, before ballooning up into the hands of Rahul Dravid at slip. But umpire Darrell Hair gave him out for 4 as England collapsed on the fourth afternoon. Pietersen posted a score of 39 in the first innings of the third test before he got a beauty from Sreesanth which moved and took the edge of the bat before being caught by Mahendra Singh Dhoni. In the second innings, he posted 7 again being caught and bowled, this time by Anil Kumble via a leading edge. Despite a quiet match for him, England won comfortably after a dismal 100 all out in India's second visit to the crease.

In the one-day series, which England lost 5–1, he was top scorer for England in four out of the five matches he played, and had the highest average of any player with 58.20. His 71 in the second ODI took him past 1,000 ODI runs, equalling Viv Richards' record of 21 innings to reach this total.

=== Sri Lanka and Pakistan in England, 2006 ===
In May 2006, Pietersen matched his highest Test score of 158 in the first match against Sri Lanka. His innings was ended when he was lbw to Chaminda Vaas. In the second test he made 142 at Edgbaston. He made almost half of England's runs. After he made his hundred, his third six saw the introduction to the Switch hit, when he turned out and played a switch hit sweep off Muttiah Muralitharan. This took him past the milestone of 1,000 Test runs, in his 12th Test match, and he became the first batsman since Graham Gooch in 1990 to score a century in three successive Test innings on English soil. This performance moved Pietersen into the top ten of the ICC cricket ratings. In the third test, he was twice removed by Murali. In the first innings, on 41, he top edged a sweep to short fine leg. In the second innings with England chasing 325, he was caught at short leg for just 6. Despite this, his performances in the first two tests earned him the England (Test match) Player of the Series. In the first and second tests of the Pakistan series, he got starts with the bat but did not get past 50. He was out lbw, offering no shot, in the first innings at Lords for 21. In the second innings, when England were pushing on, he played some nice strokes in his 41 before being stumped of the bowling of Shahid Afridi. In the second test, he made 38 when he hit a half-volley loosely to point. In the third Test at Headingley, he hit 135 runs from England's total of 515. In the final controversial test at The Oval, on a horribly wet pitch, he got the second golden duck of his Test career when he edged behind. In the second innings, he made 96 before edging behind again before the test came to an unexpected early end.

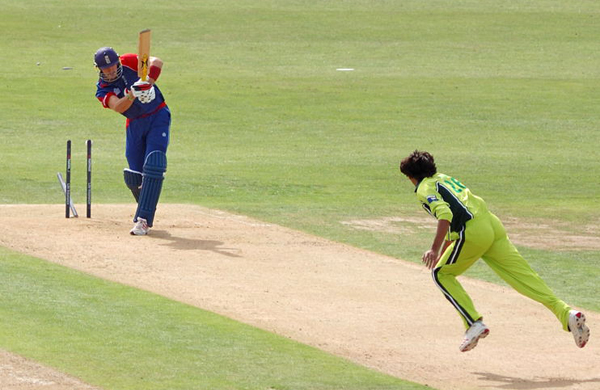
Asif bowls Pietersen for a duck

Pietersen bowled his first delivery in Test match cricket on 4 June, against Sri Lanka. His first Test wicket came against Pakistan later in the summer when Kamran Akmal got a thin edge through to Geraint Jones. Later in June, Pietersen scored 17 in the Twenty20 International as England lost by 2 runs to Sri Lanka. The twenty over match against Pakistan was no better, Pietersen being bowled by Mohammad Asif for a golden duck as Pakistan helped themselves to a five-wicket victory.

=== England in Australia, 2006–07 ===
In the much-anticipated Ashes series in Australia, Pietersen was hyped up as England's best player and this was justified as he scored 490 runs in five matches and averaged over fifty, despite Australia's obvious targeting of him. "I was interested to see how he would get on in Australia in 2006–07 on pitches with more bounce", wrote Warne, "because bowlers had tried to test him with the short ball. He was still England's best batsman."

He started well, in the First Test. Despite a failure of 16 in the first test, he produced a fine spell of batting with a good 92 in the second innings. This wasn't enough to save England from a 277 run defeat. In the second Test, he backed up his good form with a century in the Second Test in Adelaide, sharing a 310-run partnership for the fourth wicket with Paul Collingwood. When he was eventually run out, his first reaction was to "giggle" because it was the third time in his Test career that he had scored exactly 158 runs, which was, at that point, his highest Test score. However, he made 2 in a disastrous second innings collapse which cost England dear. In the third test, he was the only batsman to offer any resistance with 70 in the first innings and 60 not out in the second innings in a defeat which cost England the Ashes. However, he couldn't carry on that form as he failed to make a half-century in the final two tests as England lost 5–0.

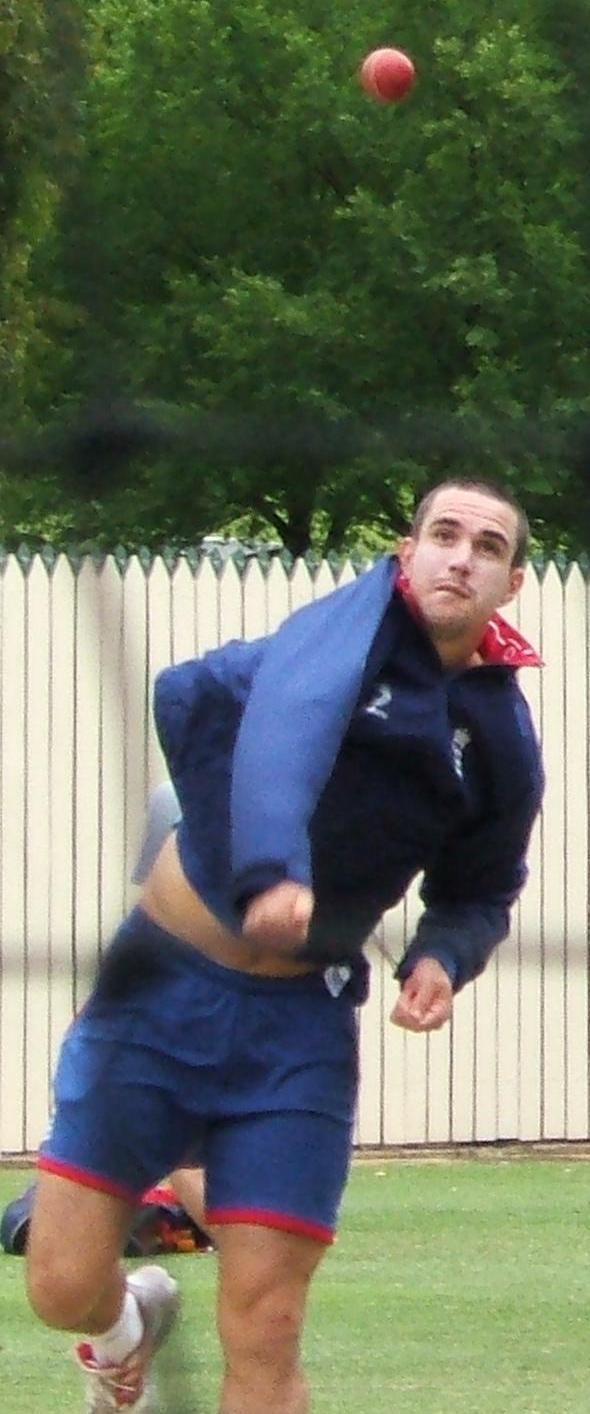
Pietersen bowling off-spin in the Adelaide Oval nets in November 2006.

In the tour's sole Twenty20 match, Pietersen was run out on eleven as England lost by 77 runs. In the first One Day International of the 2006–07 Commonwealth Bank Series, on 12 January at the Melbourne Cricket Ground, Pietersen was injured when a ball bowled by Glenn McGrath hit him on the ribs. Despite continuing his innings in some discomfort, making 82, X-rays revealed a fracture, and Pietersen was forced to miss the rest of the series.

=== Career in 2007 ===
==== 2007 World Cup ====
In the 2007 Cricket World Cup, England started in Group C with a game against New Zealand in which KP made 60 before holing out. He made another 50 against Kenya but disappointedly made just 5 against Canada as England sealed qualification. He made 48 in the unconvincing win against Ireland. Pietersen made 58 against Sri Lanka before being caught and bowled by Murali. England lost that game by 2 runs before losing the next game against Australia by 7 wickets. Pietersen crafted 104 runs off 122 balls against Australia. It was the first World Cup century by an Englishman since 1996, and the first ever against Australia. His efforts in the World Cup helped him achieve the status of International Cricket Council number-one ranked batsman in the world for ODIs. He then failed making 10 against Bangladesh and 3 against South Africa. England lost to South Africa meaning that England did not reach the semi-finals. In England's final match of the World Cup against the West Indies, Pietersen made 100 from 91 balls, and effected the run-out of retiring captain Brian Lara. This century took him past 2,000 ODI runs, in doing so equalling the record 51 matches set by Zaheer Abbas. He finished the tournament with 444 runs, at an average of 55.5, and was described as shining in the England team "like a 100 watt bulb in a room full of candles". He was named in the 'Team of the Tournament' by ESPNcricinfo.

==== West Indies in England ====
In the first test of the series he was dismissed for 26 again chasing a wide one when looking set also after 4 centuries were scored by England batsmen in the innings at Lord's, he then scored a hundred in the second innings when England were looking to accelerate. Pietersen posted his highest score of 226 in the second Test at Headingley (it was scored in 262 balls, with 24 fours and 2 sixes), surpassing his previous best of 158 which he had achieved three times. With this score, Pietersen moved ahead of Everton Weekes and Viv Richards to be the batsman with the second-highest run-total out of his first 25 Tests (behind Don Bradman). It is also the highest Test score for England since Graham Gooch scored 333 against India in 1990. This innings subjected the West Indies to an innings and 283 runs defeat, their largest against any team. Pietersen, the Man of the Match, said, "I believe the recipe for success is hard work. I've been criticised for throwing my wicket away, and I tried to make it count here".

In the third Test at Old Trafford, he carried on his bad run at the ground being bounced out twice for 9 and 68. In the second innings, Pietersen lost his wicket in a bizarre dismissal when West Indian all-rounder Dwayne Bravo delivered a bouncer which knocked Pietersen's helmet off his head and onto his stumps. He is only the fourth batsman in Test cricket to be dismissed "hit wicket" as a result of headgear falling onto the stumps. This score took him past the 8,500 first-class runs mark, and 2,500 runs in Test cricket. In the final match of the series, he registered his third duck of his Test career in the first innings and 28 in the second innings as England won the series 3–0.

In contrast, Pietersen's batting was poor in the following single innings matches; he scored a total of 77 runs in five matches (two Twenty20 and three ODI), recording a second-ball duck in the final ODI. He subsequently fell to second in the official One Day International batting rankings, behind Ricky Ponting. Pietersen himself commented that his lack of form was a result of "fatigue", and reiterated his calls for a less "hectic" match schedule.

==== India tour and Twenty20 Championship ====
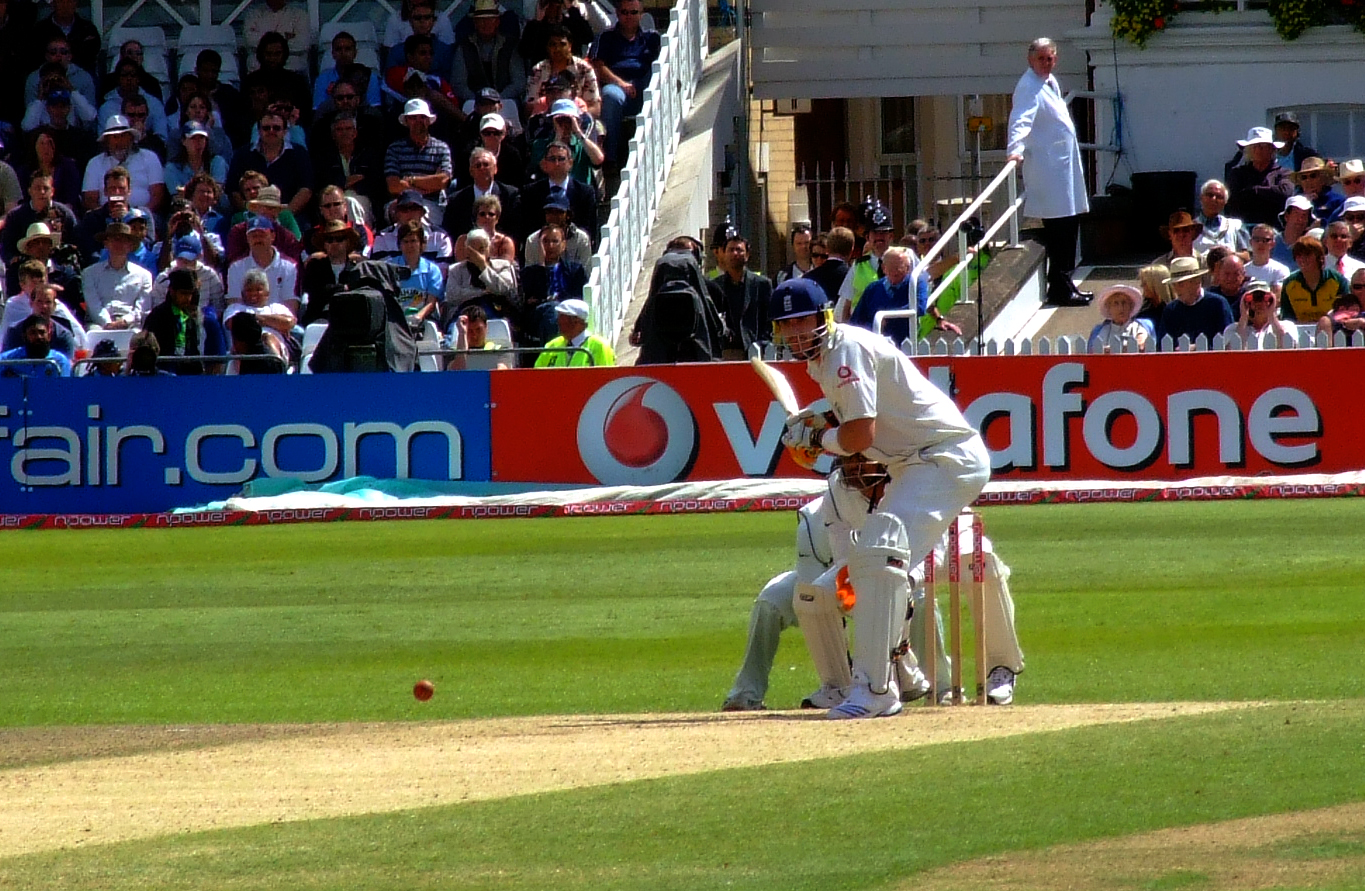
Pietersen batting during the second Test of India's tour of England in 2007

Pietersen played in the first Test against India and in the first innings, he made 37 but not without controversy. He edged the ball behind of Zaheer Khan to Dhoni. He walked, but after seeing replays on the screen, he walked back to the middle and the decision was overturned. Ironically, he was out shortly afterwards caught Dhoni, bowled Khan. In the second innings he was top scorer with a knock of 134 to set up a potential England victory. Pietersen described this as his best century, in very testing conditions. In the second test, he was twice lbw to RP Singh for 13 and 19 in a defeat which subsequently cost them the series. After making 41 in the first innings, Pietersen scored his 10th Test century in the third and final Test at the Oval, helping England to draw the game with 101. In the one-day series that followed, he struggled at the start with a top score of 33 not out in the first five matches of the series. He scored two half-centuries in the final matches including 71 not out in the final match at Lord's, hitting the winning runs to give England the series.

Pietersen was also picked for and played in the Twenty20 Championship in South Africa. In England's first game against Zimbabwe on 13 September, Pietersen hit 79 runs off 37 balls, his highest Twenty20 score, including seven fours and four sixes (one of them being another switch-hit sweep for six) in an English total of 188–9. England won the match by 50 runs; however, this was to be Pietersen's largest contribution in the competition. He scored another 99 runs over four more matches, ending the series with an average of 35.60. He also scored the most England fours (17) and jointly held the record for the most England sixes (6) with Owais Shah. He also held the highest strike rate of any England batsman.

==== Sri Lanka 2007 ====
Pietersen scored 50 in England's opening game in Sri Lanka against the Sri Lankan Cricket XI, but it took until the fourth ODI for Pietersen to find form, scoring 63 not out as England won their first series in Sri Lanka. This form was still fluctuating in the warm-up matches for the Test series, scoring 4, 1 and 59 against the Sri Lankan Cricket XI. This run continued in the Test matches when in the first test he got two starts with 31 and 18 but didn't go on. He was unfortunate as in the second innings on 18 he was bowled by a ball that kept low from Dilhara Fernando. In the second test he managed 45 not out to secure a draw in the 2nd Test. In the first innings, Pietersen's dismissal was to be the source of much controversy. He edged his fifth ball to Chamara Silva at slip, who flicked the ball up for wicketkeeper Kumar Sangakkara to complete the catch. The two on-field umpires conferred over the validity of the catch, as it was unclear whether the ball had touched the ground prior to Silva flicking the ball up. Daryl Harper, standing at the bowler's end gave the decision that the wicket had been taken, but while walking off the field, Pietersen saw a replay on the big screen and questioned the validity of the decision. This led for calls for similar catches to be referred to the third (TV) umpire, but this can only take place if the on-field umpires have not made a decision. Pietersen passed 3,000 Test runs during the series, becoming the fastest player (by time) to do so, though he only averaged 25.20, and failed to score a half century in a series for the first time.

=== Career in 2008 ===
==== New Zealand tours (home and away) ====
On England's tour against New Zealand, Pietersen averaged 33.00 in the ODI series, with one score of 50 in the tied fourth match; England lost the series 3–1. He also made a top score of 43 in the first of two comfortable Twenty20 matches. Pietersen had a quiet first two Test matches, making little impression with the bat. He produced 42 and 6 as England collapsed in their second innings. In the next test, he fared little better making 31 and 17. However, in the first innings of the Napier Test he rescued England from a disastrous start of 4–3, guiding them to 259 with 129, his 11th Test century.

New Zealand then came to tour England and Pietersen again struggled in the first two Test matches, scoring 3 in the first match. He improved slightly in the second but only making 26 in the first innings and then running himself out on 42 having looked well set. He seemed to be struggling particularly against Daniel Vettori but he showed no signs of that as he struck a century in the third Test, forming a valuable partnership with Tim Ambrose, making a crucial 115. Pietersen hit a winning 42 not out in the Twenty20 match.

==== Switch-hit ====
In the first ODI of the NatWest series, Pietersen hit two sixes by "switch-hitting" en route to 110 not out. While facing the bowling of medium pace Scott Styris, Pietersen turned his body around and switched hands (effectively batting as a left-hander) hitting two sixes over cover and long off. Because Pietersen not only reversed his hand position (as some batsman do while playing the reverse sweep), but changed his stance by rotating his body, these "switch-hit" shots were immediately followed by calls to outlaw them from the game. Although a similar shot was played when Pietersen reverse-swept Muttiah Muralitharan for six in Sri Lanka in 2006, in this case he switched hands and executed "the switch" before the ball was bowled.

Several commentators complained that because Pietersen changed from being a right-handed to a left-handed batsman as the bowler approached his delivery stride, he was gaining an unfair advantage. Gideon Haigh said that "A bowler must advise a batsman when he's changing direction, why should the batsmen not; given that where the bowler's aiming will depend on the placement of the off stump". Ian Healy seconded this by saying "It just should be outlawed straightaway. If you want to hit to one team of the field, you've got to do it in a cross fashion, and not swap the way you're facing or your grip. Otherwise you are going to start to allow the bowlers to go round the wicket, over the wicket, and keep swapping during their run-ups." Former fast-bowler Michael Holding argued "if the batsman can change from being right-handed to left-handed, there shouldn't be a problem with a bowler changing from being right-handed to left-handed, either, without having to tell the umpire, nor should he have to tell the umpire if he is going over or round the wicket."

Pietersen countered these claims by saying:

"That's ridiculous, absolutely stupid. The reverse-sweep has been part of the game for however long. I am just fortunate that I am able to hit it a bit further. Everybody wants brand new ideas, new inventions and new shots. That is a new shot played today and people should be saying it's a new way to go. There are new things happening for cricket at the moment and people shouldn't be criticising it all the time."

Another citation for the shot being outlawed was that the possibility of being out LBW ("a player is out LBW if...the ball pitches in line between wicket and wicket or on the off side of the striker's wicket") is removed, as the off side become the leg side and vice versa. The shots were considered by the Marylebone Cricket Club (MCC), governors of the game, who came to the conclusion that the shot was legal, believing that the LBW law (which continues "The off side of the striker's wicket shall be determined by the striker's stance at the moment the ball comes into play for that delivery") adequately covers the scenario. They cited the variations bowlers can make, such as bowling a googly or a slower ball, and also the inherent risk in the shot to the batsman, in the justification of their decision.

There are still calls for further review of the stroke, with Jonathan Agnew giving a scenario in which a right-handed batsman can take his stance as a left-hander, then switch stance as the bowler runs in, thus being able to kick away any balls that land outside his now off stump. He also calls for the wide law to be adjusted in one-day cricket, as bowlers are penalised for most deliveries that pass down the leg side.

=== England captaincy ===
==== Success against South Africa ====
Pietersen captained England in the fifth ODI against New Zealand after Paul Collingwood was banned for four games for a slow over-rate during the previous match. Pietersen was named as the stand-in captain for three further matches in August.

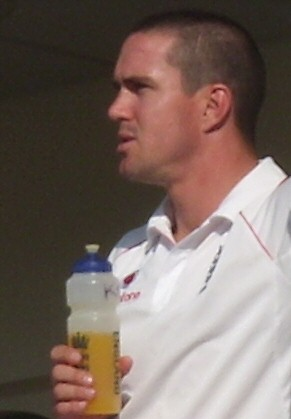
Pietersen on his first day as England Test captain at The Oval in August 2008

With Michael Vaughan as captain for the first three tests, Pietersen seemed to thrive in his first Test series against his former countrymen scoring 152 in the opening match of the series. During the third Test against South Africa, Pietersen was criticised for throwing his wicket away attempting a six to complete a century when on 94. Jonathan Agnew and Alec Stewart called the stroke "irresponsible" and Agnew continued, suggesting that Pietersen therefore ruled himself out of the potential reckoning for the England captaincy with Vaughan's place in the starting line-up in doubt after failing to score runs. In the event, having lost the match, Vaughan resigned and Pietersen was made the permanent captain of both the Test and ODI teams (Paul Collingwood relinquished the ODI captaincy at the same time).

Following the news that he had been made England Test and ODI captain, Pietersen paid tribute to both outgoing captains but announced that he would look to captain the team in his own style. He scored a century in his debut match as captain in the dead rubber fourth Test, and went on to defeat South Africa 4–0 in the ODI matches. In that series he made 90 not out and got 2–22 with the ball. In the fourth ODI, another dead rubber as England were 3–0 up, he hit a quick 40 to guide England to victory.

==== Derailment in India ====
Pietersen continued to lead the team during a 5–0 defeat to India in ODI matches; the series was supposed to consist of seven matches, but was abandoned after the fifth due to the 2008 Mumbai attacks. Pietersen however had a decent series with the bat hitting a quick 63 in the first match and 111 not out in the fifth match. Pietersen's men returned to England before resuming the tour amid unprecedented security, to play a two-Test series. Pietersen was highly vocal in regards to the resumption of the tour, citing a need to stand up to terrorism. He had an aggregate of 5 runs in 2 innings in the first test being dismissed by Yuvraj Singh in the second innings which showed Pietersen's struggles against Yuvraj from the ODI series carried on. England were defeated in the first, but recovered to draw the second with Pietersen scoring 144.

In January 2009, following England's losses in India, the media reported that Pietersen had asked the England and Wales Cricket Board (ECB) to hold emergency meetings to discuss Moores' coaching role with the team. Days later, Pietersen made remarks to the media about there being an 'unhealthy situation' that needed to be resolved in the England camp. The media speculated that Moores would shortly be replaced if there was a Pietersen–Moores rift. Moores and Pietersen were believed to be in disagreement on several issues, including the team's training regimen, and the possible selection of former England captain Michael Vaughan for the upcoming tour of the West Indies. On 7 January 2009, Moores was removed as England's coach by the ECB, and Pietersen unexpectedly resigned as captain. In the immediate aftermath of Pietersen's resignation, several commentators connected with English cricket indicated that they believed that Pietersen had miscalculated by openly advocating for the removal of Moores, particularly in making their dispute public. In an interview several days after his resignation, Pietersen revealed that he had not intended to resign as captain, but was told by ECB officials that he was resigning. Dennis Amiss, the vice-chairman of the ECB, went on record backing up Pietersen in his statement that the story of the rift with Moores had not been leaked to the media by him, saying, "We don't believe Kevin Pietersen leaked the information, we understand his frustration at it being leaked by other parties." Pietersen was captain for three Test matches, and 10 One Day International matches. It was announced that Andrew Strauss would take over the captaincy.

=== Career in 2009 ===
==== England in West Indies ====
Pietersen's first match after resigning from the captaincy garnered much media attention, played in the Caribbean during England's tour of the West Indies under the new captain, Strauss. Though Pietersen scored 97 in the first innings of the first Test, West Indies had a lead of 74 and England were bowled out for 51 with Pietersen making only one, being bowled by an out-swinger by Jerome Taylor as England collapsed to an innings defeat. After the second Test was abandoned, Pietersen made 51 in a quickly scheduled 'third' Test. His good form carried on as he scored 72 not out to give England the draw at Barbados. In the fifth and final Test, with England needing to win, Pietersen hit his quickest test century with 102 off 92 balls. He struggled in the one-day series that followed with his top score being 48.

==== Indian Premier League ====
In February 2009, Royal Challengers Bangalore of the Indian Premier League bought Pietersen for US$1,550,000, which made him the highest-paid IPL player along with Andrew Flintoff. The following month RCB owner Vijay Mallya announced that Pietersen would succeed Rahul Dravid as captain. He won two out of his six matches in charge before leaving to fulfil his international commitments with England; Anil Kumble took over the captaincy and led the Bangalore team to the IPL final. Kevin Pietersen was later bought by Deccan Chargers for the 2011 season and was sold to Delhi Daredevils in the 2012 season without having played a single game for the Chargers.

==== West Indies and the ICC World Twenty20 ====
Pietersen began 2009 with questions over his form, where many pundits viewed him to be in a slump. He was dismissed first ball in the first Test against the touring West Indies team dismissed by the full, swinging ball (a delivery which he seemed to struggle against), but in the second Test made a quick 49 before falling to an attacking shot. He then suffered what seemed only a minor right Achilles injury and was subsequently ruled out of the ODI series, which England also won. In June 2009, Pietersen played in England's World Twenty20 warm-up match against Scotland, registering an unbeaten 53 in a six-wicket England victory. He also appeared in the news after accidentally hitting a 15-year-old school boy with a cricket ball from a straight-drive after the boy had bowled to him. Pietersen left the boy, from Suffolk, with a signed bat as compensation.

Pietersen's Achilles injury began flared up ahead of England's first Twenty20 match, against the Netherlands not long after. In Pietersen's absence, England incurred a historic loss against the Dutch. He returned for the second match against Pakistan and top scored with 58 off 38 balls and hit 3 sixes (one of which was measured at over 100m) in the 48 run victory, he also top scored in the three run win over India later in the competition. Despite missing the first match Pietersen ended the tournament as England's leading runscorer with 154 at an average of 38.50. He was named in the 'Team of the Tournament' by ESPNcricinfo for the 2009 T20I World Cup.

==== 2009 Ashes ====
Pietersen joined the England Ashes squad in June 2009 for the upcoming 2009 Ashes series. Despite failing to surpass single figure scores during a warm-up match against Warwickshire, he helped England to a score over 400 on 8 July during the first day of the first Test at the SWALEC Stadium, Cardiff with 69 before being dismissed by Nathan Hauritz, top-edging a sweep to a ball outside off stump; the dismissal was heavily criticised. He also seemed to flare up his Achilles injury again suddenly which hampered his batting a bit. In the second innings he was bowled for 8 after leaving a straight ball from Ben Hilfenhaus. Many pundits thought the criticism of England's key batsman from the first innings possibly affected him. In the first innings at Lords, after proving his fitness, he came at 222–2 and played some trademark shots before being caught behind off Peter Siddle. In the second innings he came in when England had a lead of almost 300 and he and Ravi Bopara batted for time. Pietersen limped when he ran and many shots ran off the inside edge which raised serious doubts for the rest of the series. He actually did well to reach 44 before being caught behind off Siddle again. After struggling in the field as England won, Pietersen was ruled out of the rest of the series with an Achilles injury. This brought to an end 54 consecutive Test matches. As his recovery slowed, Pietersen was not included in the 2009 ICC Champions Trophy and Andy Flower speculated that due to an infection of the wound Pietersen "may miss this winter's tour of South Africa because of slow progress in recovery from surgery."

=== Career in 2010 ===
Pietersen returned from injury in time to play a part in the 2009–10 winter tour of South Africa. His contributions, nevertheless, were significantly below his pre-injury range with an average of just 27. He showed several lapses of concentration, leading some to suggest that off-field distractions and lingering issues with his removal from the captaincy were still affecting his form.

Pietersen went into the two-match tour of Bangladesh on the back of poor performances on his return from injury and led to speculation Pietersen's England place was under pressure. However, an important first innings of 99 in the first Test and a series clinching score of 74 not out in the second, during a stand of 167 not out with Alastair Cook, saw Pietersen return to much more respectable figures. England won the series 2–0 and Pietersen finished with total runs of 250 and an average for the series of 83.33.

Pietersen joined up with his Royal Challengers Bangalore team following the conclusion to England's tour of Bangladesh. Pietersen showed further signs of a return to form in the IPL by scoring 236 runs with a high score of 66*, with an average of 59.00, which was the highest in the IPL.

==== 2010 ICC World Twenty20 ====
Pietersen was selected in England's 15-man squad for the 2010 ICC World Twenty20 in the West Indies. Pietersen's tournament got off to a poor start as he made was dismissed for duck by Rory Kleinveldt in a warm up match. In England's first match against the West Indies, Pietersen started confidently scoring 24 from 20 balls before being dismissed on the pull by Darren Sammy. Against Ireland, he struggled to get going, scoring a slow 9 from 18 balls. In England's super eights match against Pakistan he scored 73* from 52 balls, guiding England to a 6 wicket win. In the following super eights match against South Africa, Pietersen scored an aggressive 53 runs from 33 balls, contributing to a 94 run partnership with Craig Kieswetter and a 39 run victory for England. For his performance, he was named man of the match.

Following the conclusion of this match, Pietersen returned home to England to be present at the birth of his son. Pietersen returned in time for England's semi-final against Sri Lanka, where he scored a vital 42* from 26 balls, guiding England home to a 7 wicket victory and a place in their first ICC tournament final since the 2004 ICC Champions Trophy. In the final against old foes Australia, he scored 47 runs from 31 balls, which included 4 fours and 1 six. Pietersen shared in a vital stand of 111 with Kieswetter, before holing out to David Warner off the bowling of Steve Smith. Pietersen's knock was vital in helping England secure a 7 wicket victory and their first ever major ICC tournament victory. After the match Pietersen was named man of the series for his vital contributions with the bat, which ended with Pietersen being the second highest run scorer with 248 runs at an average of 62.00 and a strike rate of 137.77.

==== Bangladesh, Australia and Pakistan ====
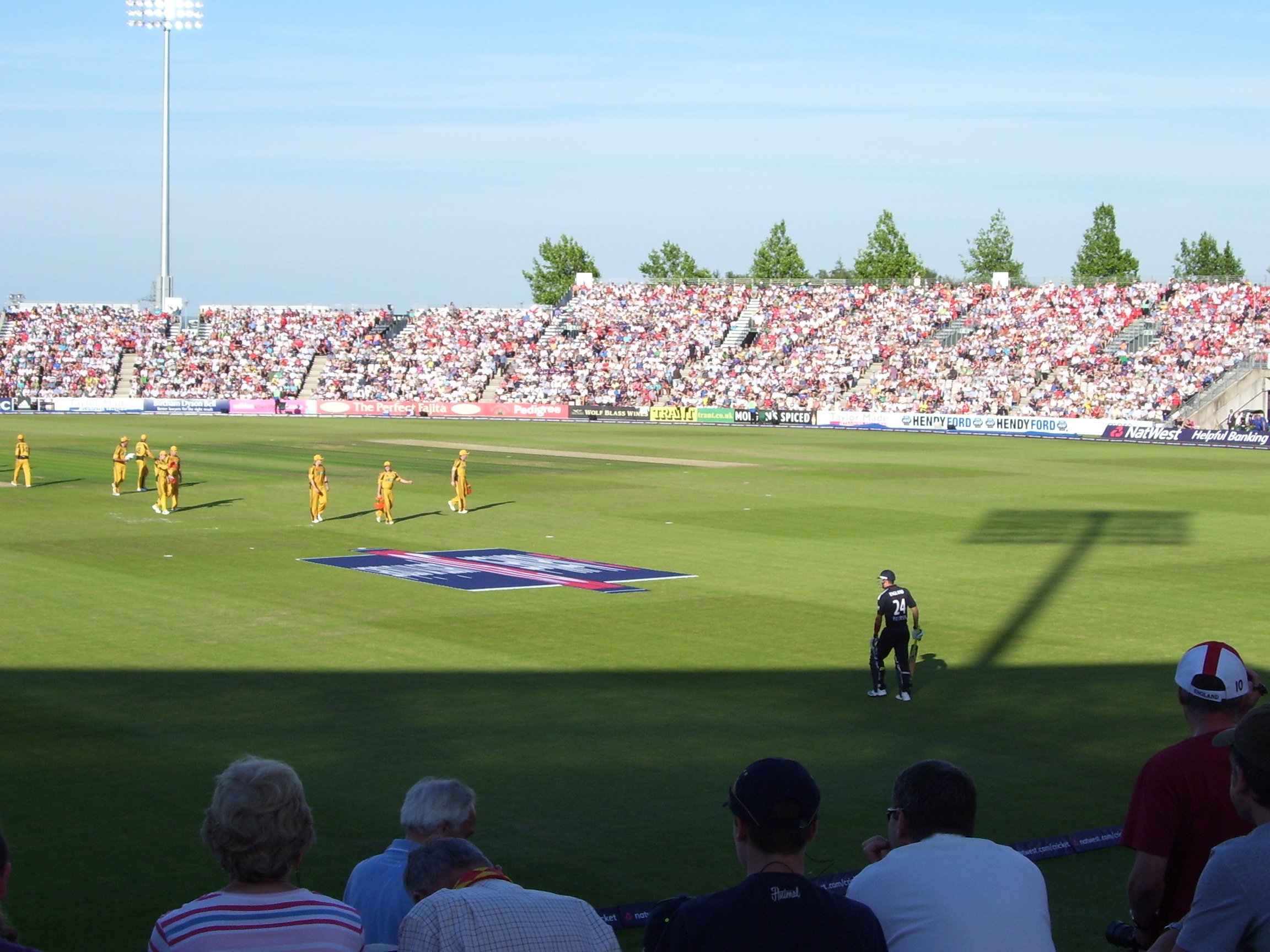
Pietersen walks out to bat against Australia at the Rose Bowl in his 100th ODI

Pietersen played in the Bangladesh home series, however contributed only 18 in the first innings before assisting England in chasing down a modest total with 10*. He made 64 in the second Test, however. After the Test series, attention was drawn to Pietersen's lack of games for Hampshire – having not played a County Championship at the Rose Bowl since 2005. Having made one Twenty20 appearance for them against Surrey after the Bangladesh Test series, it was announced that he would be leaving Hampshire, stating that "Geographically it just doesn't work. I live in Chelsea." On 22 June, Pietersen played his 100th ODI against Australia at his home ground, the Rose Bowl.

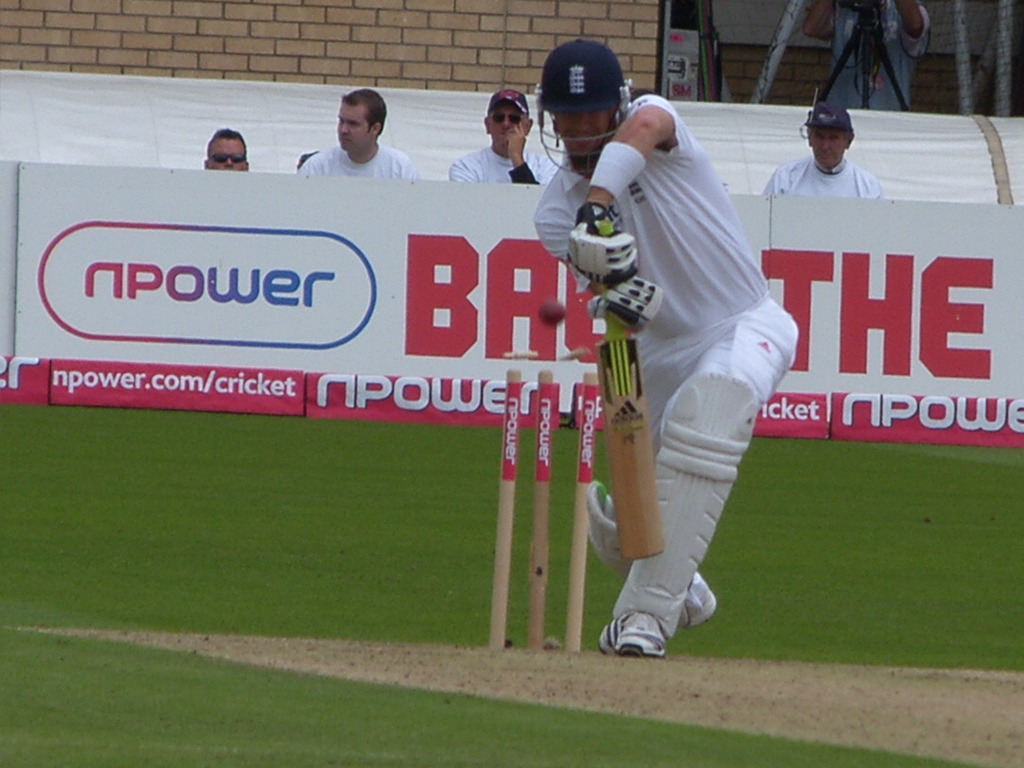
Pietersen bowled for 9 in the first Test v Pakistan at Trent Bridge July 2010

Pietersen struggled for form in an ODI series against Australia and then a Test series against Pakistan. England beat Australia 3–2, but Pietersen could only manage a top-score of 33. England beat Pakistan 3–1, and although Pietersen top-scored for England with 80 in the second Test, it was the only time he passed 50 and ended the series with a golden duck. His poor form, and an admission by Pietersen before the final Test that he was low on confidence, led to many in the media, including Geoffrey Boycott, to suggest that Pietersen could do with playing County Cricket to regain his form before the 2010–11 Ashes series.

Pietersen was omitted from both of England's limited-overs squads to face Pakistan. However, the ECB brokered a loan move to Surrey for the remainder of the 2010 English cricket season which enables him to play first-class cricket whilst the England team plays Pakistan in the limited overs leg of the tour. Pietersen announced the omission and loan-move to Surrey early through a Twitter message, which contained a swear-word and was quickly removed, and he apologised the following day. The online outburst drew some criticism of him, with national selector Geoff Miller one of those criticising the message. During the lead up to the 2010/11 Ashes Series Pietersen signed up for two first-class games in the South African competition with the KwaZulu Natal Dolphins.

==== The Ashes in Australia ====
Pietersen went into the 2010–11 Ashes series without a century since March 2009, and many felt that England would be unable to retain the Ashes unless he found form. In the first Test at the Gabba, Brisbane, Pietersen hit 43 in the first innings but wasn't required in the second as England posted 517–1 declared before a draw was declared.

In the second Test in Adelaide, where he hit 158 on the previous Ashes tour, Pietersen joined opener Alastair Cook (148) to make a century partnership before going on to score his 17th Test century. He finished with 227, a Test-best and his second Test double-century, as England declared on 620–5. Given a rare bowl at the end of the fourth day, Pietersen claimed the wicket of Michael Clarke (80) to leave Australia 238–4. England then proceeded to bowl Australia out in the final morning to win by an innings and 71 runs, and Pietersen was named man-of-the-match.

==== 2011 ODI series against Australia ====
In the ODI series that followed the Ashes Test Series Pietersen's performance was solid in the first ODI at the MCG. His team high score of 78 helping England to post a traditionally competitive near 300 score. England were however defeated by the chasing Australians after Shane Watson's monumental 161 not out. After making a first ball duck in the second ODI at Hobart Pietersen's fitness once again became an issue and he missed the third ODI due to a "groin strain". The fourth ODI, despite Pietersen making only 12 with the bat, was won by England. On 29 January Kevin announced to the media that England could make a miraculous comeback to win the series from 3–1 down. In the three remaining matches (all England defeats) Pietersen scored 40, 29 and 26 respectively. Australia won the seven match ODI series 6–1.

=== Career in 2011 ===
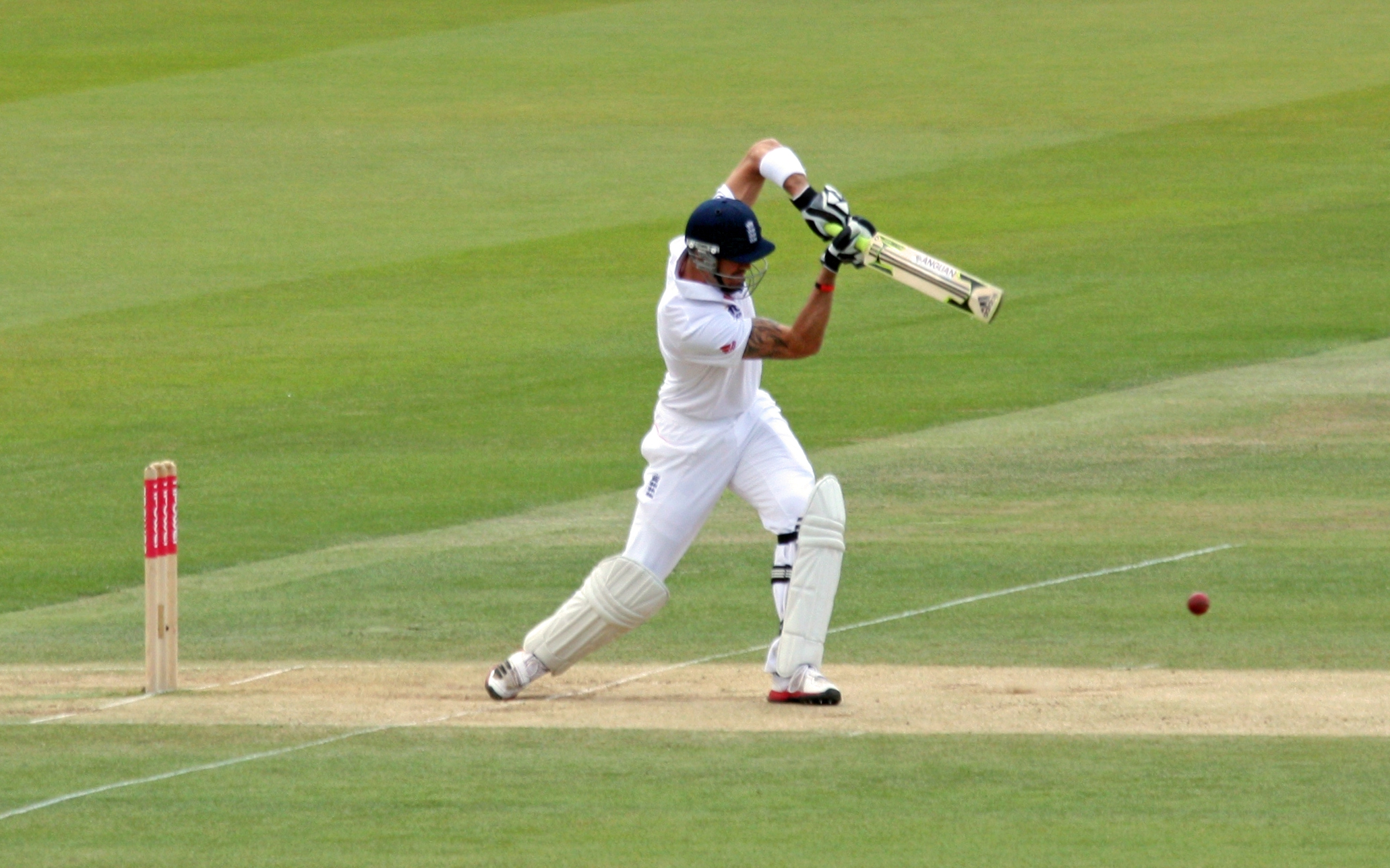
Pietersen batting during his innings of 72 against Sri Lanka at Lord's

Pietersen was part of England's 15-man squad for the 2011 World Cup hosted by Bangladesh, India and Sri Lanka between February and March. In the warm-up matches he was asked to open the batting in anticipation that he would assume the position for the whole tournament. He had opened the batting just six times in one-day games and never for England, although had done so for England A in 2004. Pietersen returned home early due to injury. A hernia required immediate surgery and the recovery time of around six weeks meant he would miss the rest of the tournament and potentially the IPL. Eoin Morgan took Pietersen's place in the squad. Pietersen earned some criticism after being sighted at a nightclub in London while injured, however he dismissed the criticism as unwarranted.

He returned from injury for the home series against Sri Lanka in May 2011. Pietersen was also picked to play against India in July 2011, and scored 202 not out at Lord's in the 1st Test. During the innings, Pietersen passed 6,000 runs in Tests. The feat took exactly six years, which is the fastest in terms of time taken, and 128 innings. In the fourth Test he scored 175 runs and shared a partnership of 350 runs with Ian Bell. Pietersen was rested for the ODI series against that followed the Tests.

=== Career in 2012 ===
==== Sri Lanka and the IPL ====
Pietersen played a pivotal role in England's tour of Sri Lanka. By scoring a century in the second of two Tests, not only did he move to 20 centuries for England, but he levelled the series at 1–1, ensuring England retain their No.1 Test Ranking status. On 10 April, Pietersen started his first match in the 2012 Indian Premier League for his new team, the Delhi Daredevils. He scored his maiden century in that format during the tournament.

In May 2012, Pietersen was fined for a Twitter outburst against ex-England opener, Nick Knight. He commented "Can somebody please tell me how Knight has worked his way into the commentary box for Tests? Ridiculous" and despite attempts by Cook to "downplay" the incident, the ECB elected to uphold the fine. It was Pietersen's second controversial use of the social media system following the incident in September 2010 where he announced his own dropping from the one-day team, for which he was also fined.

==== Retirement from ODI and T20 ====
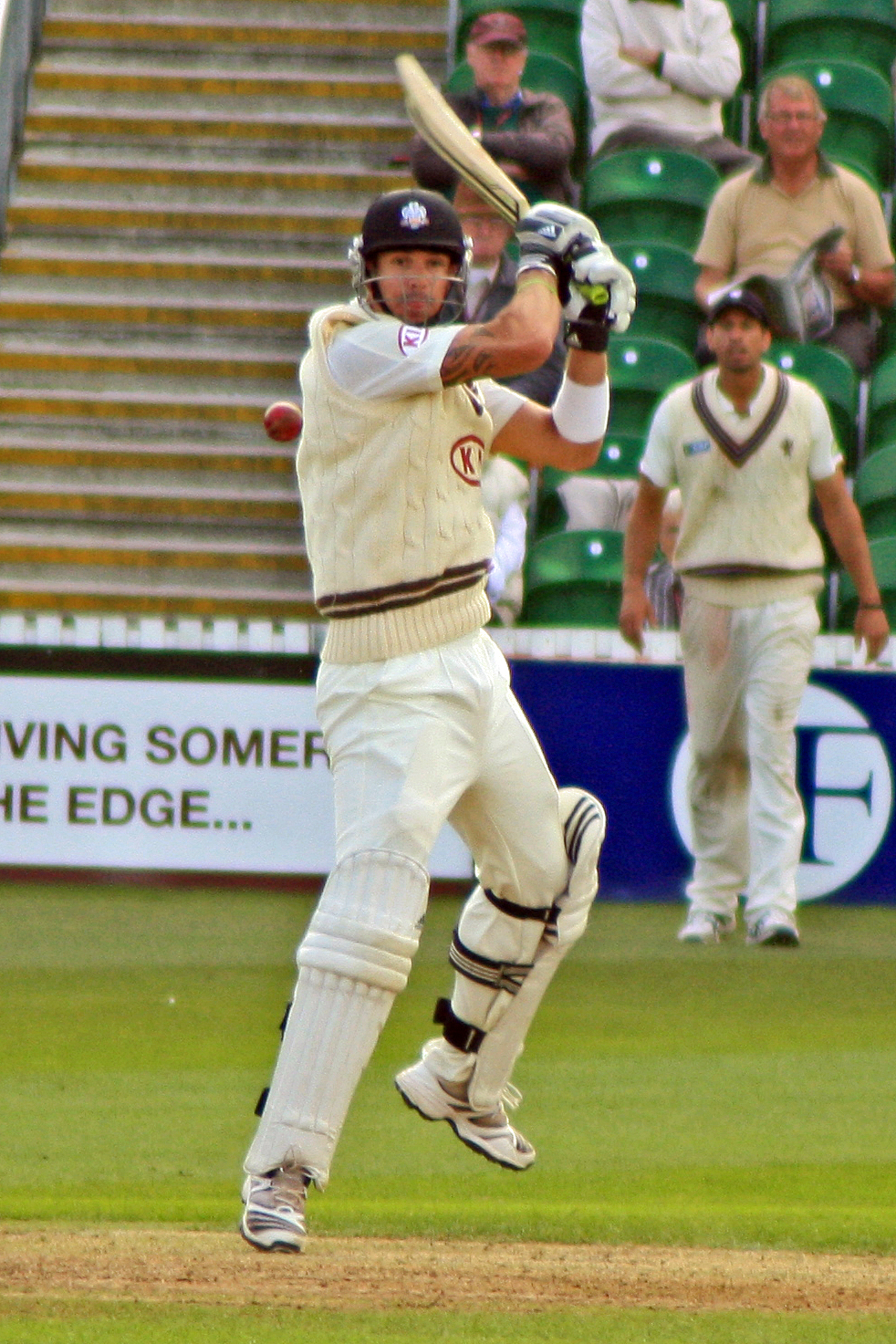
Pietersen batting for Surrey against Somerset after his ODI retirement.

On 31 May 2012, Pietersen announced his retirement from one-day international cricket. Although he intended to still play Twenty20s for England, and especially the World Twenty20 tournament in September 2012, the terms of his central contract meant that he had to retire from both forms. Remaining available for Test cricket only, Pietersen said that "with the intensity of the international schedule and the increasing demands on my body, I think it is the right time to step aside and let the next generation of players come through to gain experience for the World Cup in 2015." This announcement came on the back of his 80 against the West Indies at Trent Bridge as England took an unassailable 2–0 lead in the three-Test series. However, on 9 July 2012, Pietersen reversed his decision and suggested that he may return to ODIs in the future.

==== South Africa in the summer of 2012 ====
After the second Test against South Africa during the latter's tour of England in the summer of 2012, in which Pietersen scored his 21st Test century (149) and took Test-best bowling figures (3–52), Pietersen suggested that the third and final Test of that series might be his last. In the same press conference, he also mentioned issues within the dressing room that needed to be resolved. In the following days, allegations were made that he sent defamatory text messages to members of the South African dressing room, with Strauss and Flower said to be referred to within the messages.

Following talks with the ECB, however, Pietersen then unreservedly committed his future to all forms of cricket for England in a video interview posted on YouTube. He was dropped for the third Test after failing to provide clarification about those messages, despite announcement of the squad being delayed to provide more time for him to do so. He was replaced by Jonny Bairstow.

==== Reintegration and comeback ====
In October 2012, ECB confirmed that they had a process which could lead to Pietersen's return to the English cricket team. This led to Pietersen's selection as part of the Test squad later that month. He toured India with a successful England team under Cook, scoring 338 runs in four Tests including a century and two fifties. The century, in the second of four Tests, took Pietersen to 22 Test hundreds, level with the England record. That century was named as third best Test innings of the decade by Wisden in 2019. Cook broke the record by scoring his twenty-third hundred during the same series. Pietersen also featured in the tour's ODI series, scoring 185 runs across a five-match series that ended in an English defeat.

=== Career in 2013–14 ===
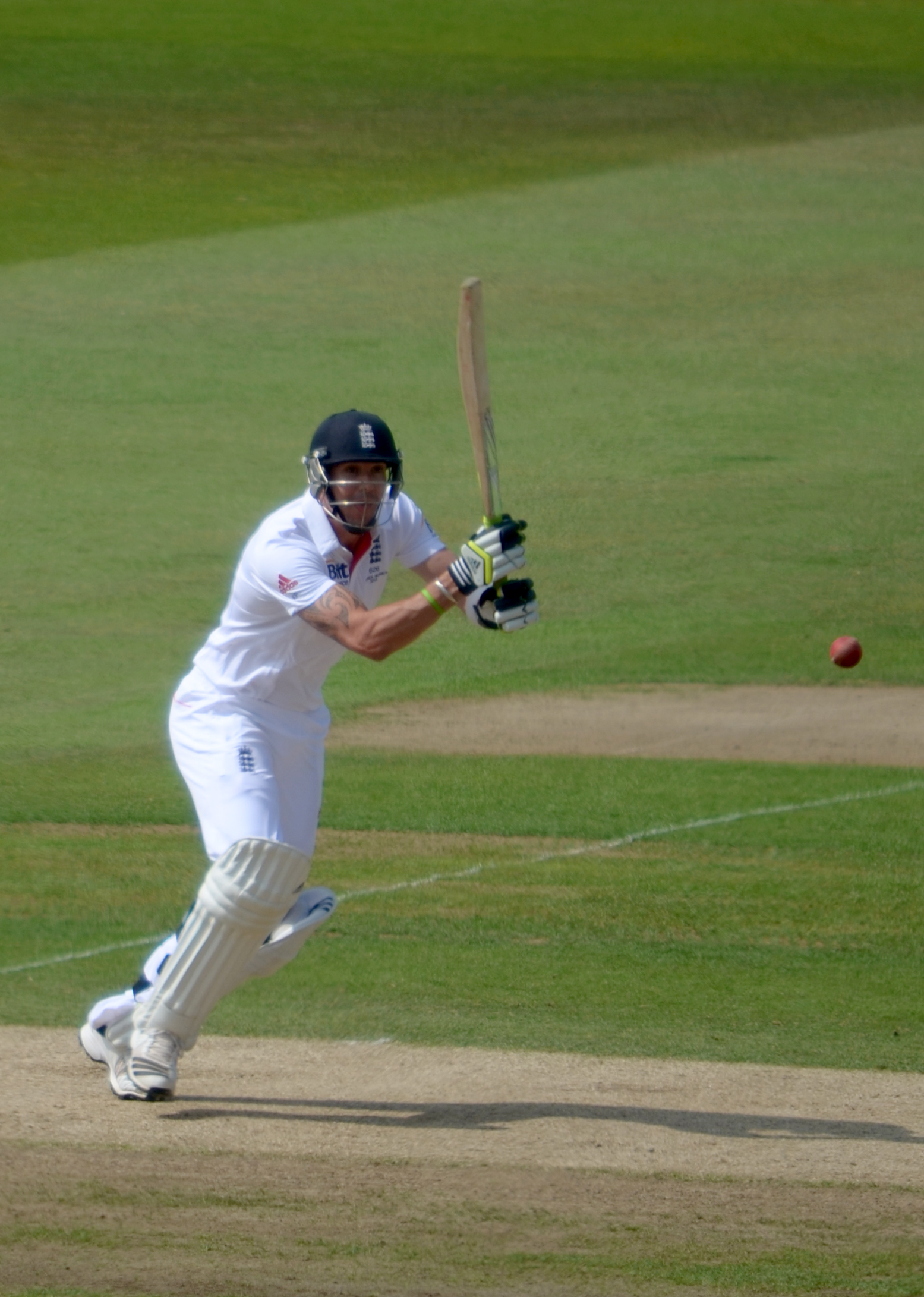
Pietersen batting during the 2013 Ashes

Pietersen featured in the three-Test series in New Zealand in February 2013, scoring 73 in the second match. A knee injury forced him to miss the return home series in May that year, however, and prompted fears over fitness for the upcoming 2013 Ashes series. Though he did not play against New Zealand, the ECB remained hopeful over his ability to play against Australia come the summer. On 3 August 2013, Pietersen not only scored a century in the third Ashes series match in the first innings, he became the highest run scorer for England across all forms of cricket combined.

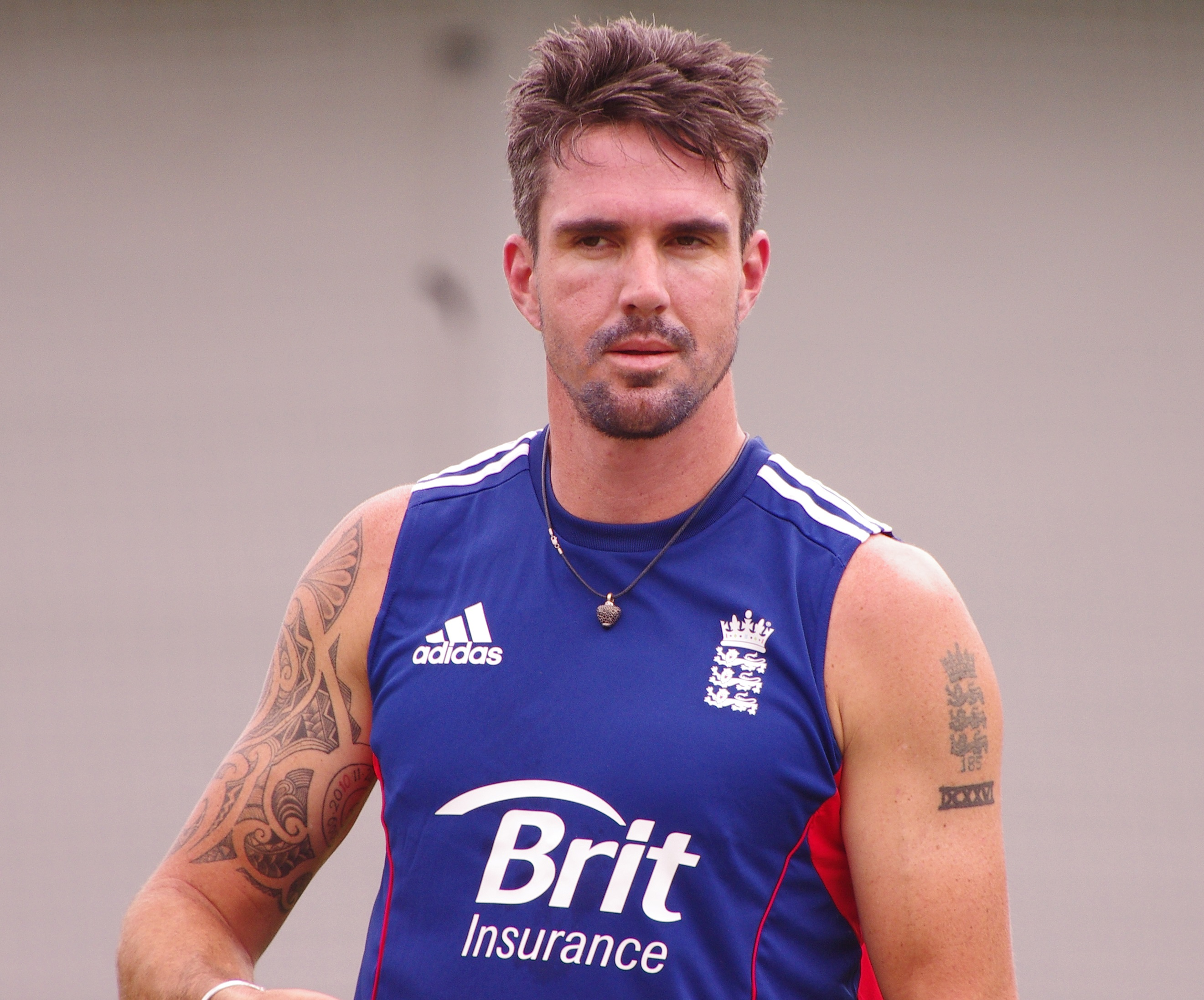
Pietersen in 2014

His return Ashes tour over the winter of 2013–14 was less successful, however. In a series which England lost 5–0, Pietersen averaged only 29 and passed fifty only twice in ten innings. He made his 100th Test appearance in the first Test. During this game Pietersen was dismissed by a widely reported catch taken by Chris Sabburg, who entered the field as a substitute fielder. He remained nevertheless England's leading run scorer with 294 runs. He also bowled during the fifth and final Test. Once the tour had ended, and the fallout had contributed to the removal of Flower as head coach, there was much media speculation on the nature of Pietersen's relationship with the team management. The ECB met and announced on 4 February 2014 that Pietersen had not been selected for the upcoming tour of the Caribbean, a decision they described as "unanimous". Media announcements immediately began stating that Pietersen's career was over. Pietersen himself released a statement which read "Although I am obviously very sad the incredible journey has come to an end, I'm also hugely proud of what we, as a team, have achieved over the past nine years."

== Post-playing career and image ==
Kevin Pietersen published his autobiography: Kevin Pietersen: Crossing the Boundary in early 2007. A second biography: Kevin Pietersen: Portrait of a Rebel written by journalist Marcus Stead, was published in the autumn of 2009. This book includes a detailed account of the controversies of Pietersen's reign as England captain. A revised and updated version of Stead's book, now titled 'KP – The Biography' , which brought his story up-to-date, was published in July 2013. KP: The Autobiography was published in October 2014, ghost written by Irish sports journalist David Walsh.

Pietersen has expressed gratitude over having time for his family. He has also reiterated over the years his regret over trying "too hard to be English" at the expense of his home.

Pietersen is a prominent advocate for the welfare and conservation of endangered animals in South Africa. In 2018, he opened Umganu Lodge, a luxury resort at the edge of Kruger National Park. He also established Saving Our Rhinos Africa & India (SORAI), a social enterprise supporting rhinoceros conservation.

In 2019, BBC Radio 5 Live featured Pietersen in the Beast of Man podcast. The programme profiled his role in combating illegal poaching, particularly that of rhinoceros.

== Achievements ==
=== Awards ===
Pietersen gained several awards for his performances in the 2005 season. He was named both the ICC ODI Cricketer of the Year and Emerging Cricketer of the Year in 2005, and was one of the five Wisden Cricketers of the Year (alongside team mates Simon Jones and Matthew Hoggard) for his role in the successful 2005 Ashes series against Australia. Along with the rest of the England team, Pietersen was recognised in the 2006 New Year Honours, being appointed a Member of the Order of the British Empire for services to cricket. He also played for the ICC World XI in the 2005 ICC Super Series against Australia.

=== Test match performance ===
==== Records ====
- Second-highest run-total from his first 25 Tests (behind Sir Don Bradman).
- Fourth Englishman to make the top score in both innings of debut Test.
- One of only twenty-five players to have a peak ICC batting rating over 900.
- Achieved 5,000 Test runs in the fastest time, reaching this feat in 4 years and 243 days.

== International centuries ==
Pietersen scored 23 Test centuries and 9 ODI centuries, totaling 32 centuries in his international career.

Preceded by Michael Vaughan	English national cricket captain 2008–2009	Succeeded by Andrew Strauss
Preceded by Irfan Pathan	Emerging Player of the Year; 2005	Succeeded by Ian Bell
