= Seven Deadly Sins: My Pursuit of Lance Armstrong =

2012 book by David Walsh

- Author: David Walsh
- Subject: Lance Armstrong
- Genre: Sports
- Publication date: December 13, 2012

Seven Deadly Sins: My Pursuit of Lance Armstrong is a sports book written by Sunday Times journalist David Walsh, which released on December 13, 2012. In the book, Walsh writes about his 13-year fight to bring out the truth behind American cyclist Lance Armstrong's seven Tour de France wins, i.e. that Armstrong had used banned substances. Walsh was vindicated when Armstrong was stripped of all seven of his Tour titles and banned from the sport for life on October 22, 2012. Armstrong's seven Tour wins are told to be his "seven deadly sins".

Armstrong confessed to doping in an interview with Oprah Winfrey in January 2013. The 2015 movie The Program is based on the book. Chris O'Dowd and Ben Foster star as Walsh and Armstrong, respectively. The movie earned $3.3 million worldwide.

Ceremony/award	Award	Result
2013 Irish Book Awards	RTÉ Television Sports Book of the Year	Won
William Hill award	William Hill Sports Book of the Year	Nominated
