= Pierre Ballester =

French sports journalist (born 1959)

Pierre Ballester (1959) is a French sports journalist. He has written extensively about doping in cycling.

== Career ==
He was a correspondent in London for Agence France-Presse, Sport, and L'Equipe.

Ballester co-wrote L.A. Confidentiel with David Walsh. It was published in 2004 by La Martinière. The book resulted in a number of lawsuits by Lance Armstrong's lawyers in France and England.

He also co-wrote Le Sale Tour (a pun in French : literally « the dirty tour », for Tour de France, double entending « dirty trick [also 'tour' in french] » ) with Walsh, about Armstrong's "comeback" in the 2009-2010 period.

== Bibliography ==
- Le sale Tour, with David Walsh - Seuil - 2009 - ISBN 978-2-02-099480-4
- Tempêtes sur le Tour - Éditions du Rocher - 2008 - ISBN 978-2-268-06598-4
- L.A. Officiel' co-écrit avec David Walsh - Éditions de La Martinière - 2006 - ISBN 978-2-84675-204-6
- La France du rugby - Éditions Panama - 2006 - ISBN 978-2-7557-0290-3
- L.A. Confidentiel - Les secrets de Lance Armstrong co-écrit avec David Walsh - Points - 2004 - ISBN 978-2-7578-0027-0
