= David Walsh (journalist) =

Irish sports journalist

David Joseph Walsh (born 17 June 1955) is an Irish sports journalist and chief sports writer for the British newspaper The Sunday Times. He is a four-time Irish Sportswriter of the Year and a three-time UK Sportswriter of the Year. Walsh was the key journalist in uncovering the doping program by Lance Armstrong and the US Postal Service Cycling Team, leading to a lifetime ban from cycling for Armstrong and being stripped of his seven Tour titles.

== Career ==
Walsh began his career as a cub reporter on the Leitrim Observer, where he worked his way up to become editor at 25. He left the paper to join the Dublin-based daily the Irish Press. In 1984, he took a year out to cover cycling in Paris. Returning to his Dublin-based paper after that year, he ultimately left in 1987 to work for the Sunday Tribune before moving onto the rival Sunday Independent four years later. Walsh joined The Sunday Times in Ireland in 1996 and began working on the story about doping in professional cycling shortly after moving to England in 1998.

Walsh was the ghost writer for cricketer Kevin Pietersen's autobiography, published in October 2014.

== Investigation on doping within cycling ==
Referred to as the 'Little Troll' by Lance Armstrong, Walsh along with fellow Irishman and Sunday Times journalist Paul Kimmage, led the way in exposing the systematic doping rife within cycling, in particular the US Postal Team and its leader, Lance Armstrong. Walsh revealed in the Sunday Times in 2001 after a two-year investigation that Armstrong was working with the controversial Italian doctor Michele Ferrari. Under the headline "Champ or Cheat?" The Sunday Times asked in 2001 why a clean rider would work with a dirty doctor.

Walsh's books on Armstrong include L.A. Confidentiel (2003 with Pierre Ballester), in which Armstrong's soigneur Emma O'Reilly revealed that she has taken clandestine trips to pick up and drop off what she concluded were doping products; From Lance to Landis: Inside the American Doping Controversy at the Tour de France; and Seven Deadly Sins: My Pursuit of Lance Armstrong (2012).

Reacting to the confessions Armstrong made in an interview with Oprah Winfrey, broadcast on 17 and 18 January 2013, Walsh said that "the interview was fine in as far as it went, but it did not go nearly far enough, and even in as far as it went I was particularly disappointed that he didn't admit what might be called the hospital room admission from 1996". Walsh was also disappointed that Armstrong failed to "name names".

Before Winfrey did the interview, Walsh's Sunday Times bought a full-page ad in the Chicago Tribune—Winfrey lives in Chicago—to suggest 10 questions she should ask. The Sunday Times lost a libel suit over Walsh's coverage and Walsh wrote in a postscript to his 10 questions in The Tribune: "The Sunday Times is seeking to recover about $1.5m (million) it claims he got by fraud. He used Britain's draconian libel laws against us".

Referring to the battle against doping in cycling sport on a global scale, Walsh said in January 2013 in an interview with Global Cycling Network (GCN) that "cycling needs new leadership" and that Greg LeMond "could serve as interim UCI president in an effort to pressure Pat McQuaid to leave his post".

On 29 January 2013, the World Anti-Doping Agency (WADA) said it is "dismayed" by the way cycling's global governing body has handled the fallout from the Lance Armstrong affair and accused it of being "deceitful" and "arrogant". John Fahey, the president of WADA concluded that "UCI has again chosen to ignore its responsibility" to cycling.

In October 2013, it was announced that his book Seven Deadly Sins: My Pursuit of Lance Armstrong was to be adapted into a film entitled The Program, directed by Stephen Frears and starring Chris O'Dowd as Walsh and Ben Foster as Armstrong. The film was released in Autumn 2015.

=== Awards and nominations ===
Ceremony/award	Award	Work	Result
2000 British Press Awards	Sports Writer of the Year	Sunday Times	Won
2003 British Press Awards	Sports Writer of the Year	Sunday Times	Won
2012 British Press Awards	Journalist of the Year	Sunday Times	Won
2013 British Press Awards	Barclays Lifetime Achievement Award	Sunday Times	Won
2013 Irish Book Awards	RTÉ Television Sports Book of the Year	Seven Deadly Sins	Won
William Hill award	William Hill Sports Book of the Year	Seven Deadly Sins	Nominated

== Controversies ==
In 2012, Walsh gave a character reference for former sports journalist Tom Humphries during his trial for child molestation. In October 2017, Walsh apologised for what he said in a 2012 radio interview about the case but said he would remain friends with Humphries despite his conviction.
