= 2004 Tour de France, Prologue to Stage 9 =

Cycling race stages

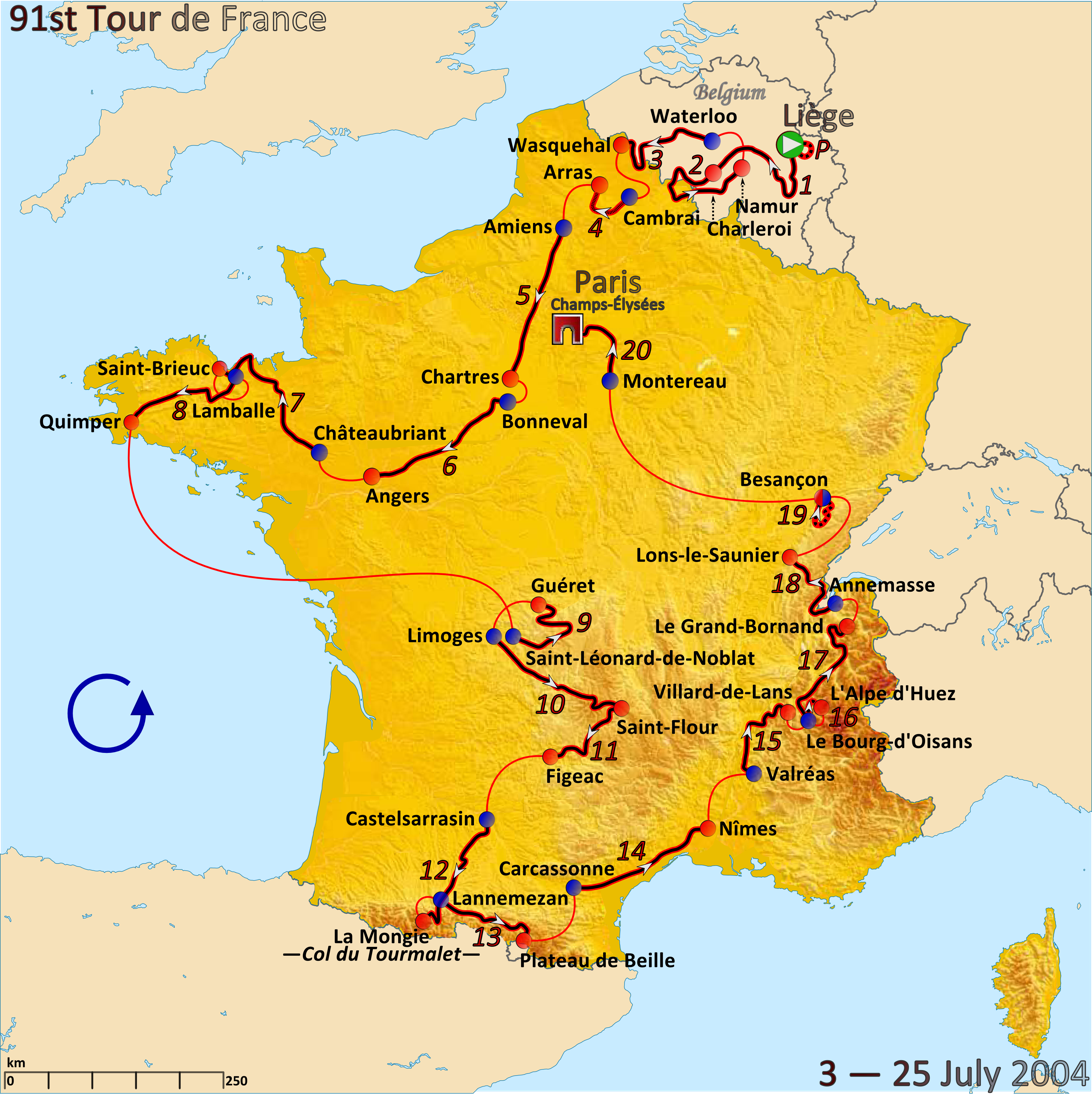
Route of the 2004 Tour de France

The 2004 Tour de France first ten stages began with the Prologue individual time trial in Liège, Belgium and continued through Stage 9 (Saint-Léonard-de-Noblat to Guéret). The stages were mostly flat and most ended with the main field finishing together. However, Stage 4 was a team time trial with each team riding alone competing against the clock. Also, between Stages 8 and 9 the riders had a rest day where no stage occurred. 188 riders from 21 teams began the Prologue, but 16 dropped out of the race due to varying reasons leaving only 172 riders at the end of Stage 9. Five different riders had the overall lead in the race, including five-time defending champion Lance Armstrong. With a long breakaway in Stage 5, where a group of five riders had a 12-minute advantage over the main competitors, Frenchman Thomas Voeckler of the Brioches La Boulangère team took a 9-minute lead over all of the pre-race favorites. He held the lead through the rest of these ten stages and into the next group of stages.

== Jerseys ==
The jerseys in the Tour de France are used to signify the leaders in each category during each stage. The overall leader in the general classification is given the maillot jaune (yellow jersey). Intermediate sprint points are placed throughout each stage with points given to the first set of riders to pass the point as well as points given to stage winners, with the points leader given the Maillot Vert (green jersey). Any classified mountain during stages are given a set of points for the first riders to crest the mountain with the leader in mountain points given the Maillot à Pois Rouges (polka-dot jersey). Any rider under the age of 26 on 1 January 2004 were eligible to win the young rider competition and the Maillot Blanc (white jersey) as the highest overall young rider in general classification. Additional awards are given for the best placed team and the most combative in each stage which are presented as colored numbers for the back of the riders jerseys. At the end of each stage the leaders/winners of each category for the day are awarded their jerseys/numbers and wear them for the next stage.

Legend (Note: Jerseys appearing in the individual stage results tables indicate those worn by the cyclist during the stage, while those appearing in the overall standings tables indicate those awarded to the cyclist after the stage.)
A yellow jersey	Denotes the leader of the general classification	A green jersey	Denotes the leader of the points classification
A polka-dot jersey	Denotes the leader of the mountains classification	A white jersey	Denotes the leader of the young rider classification
A jersey with a black rider number on a yellow background	Denotes the leader of the team classification (Note: The bibs are designated to all remaining riders within the leading team.)	A jersey with a white rider number on a red background	Denotes the rider designated as the day's most combative
	s.t. indicates that the rider crossed the finish line in the same group as the winner of the stage, and was therefore credited with the same finishing time.		

== Prologue ==
3 July 2004 — Liège, 6.1 km (3.8 mi) (ITT)

The short time trial covered 6.1 km (3.8 mi) of the streets of Liège. The course was almost completely flat, with just a 5-metre peak at 4.3 km completed. The course was raced in cool, cloudy conditions and despite occasional light rain proved to be very fast, but it caused the fall of several riders.

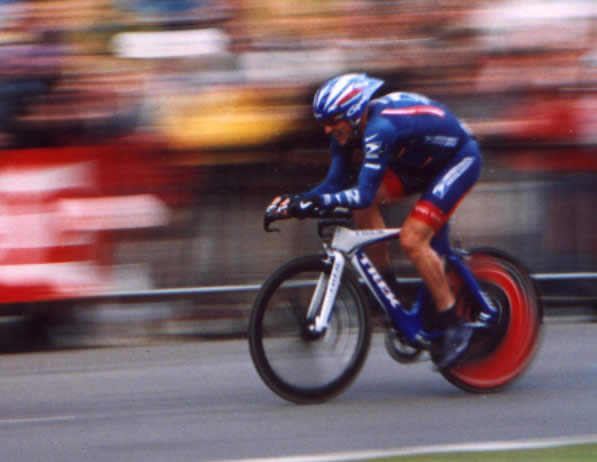
Lance Armstrong zipped past surroundings in the prologue on July 3, 2004.

The winner was Swiss Tour-debutant Fabian Cancellara who completed the course in 6'51" at an average speed of 53.560 km/h, the third fastest in the race's history. Cancellara was in his second year with the Fassa Bortolo and was junior and U23 world time trial champion in 1999 and 2000 respectively. Lance Armstrong finished second, just seconds behind Cancellara's time, and impressively ahead of most of his major competitors in the general classification, and all the other expected challengers finished within 20" of Cancellara, who after the prologue declared that he believed himself to be the world's best rider in such short distances. Cancellara's performance put him at the top of both the general classification and the race for sprinters points, which would give him both the yellow, white and green jerseys. Since one does not wear two jerseys, however, the green jersey is "loaned" to the racer in second place in that competition, which, in this case, had the unusual result of putting Lance Armstrong in green.

Prologue results and general Classification

Rank	Rider	Team	Time
1	Fabian Cancellara (SUI)	Fassa Bortolo	6' 51"
~~2~~	~~Lance Armstrong (USA)~~	~~U.S. Postal Service~~	~~+ 2"~~
3	José Iván Gutiérrez (ESP)	Illes Balears–Banesto	+ 8"
4	Bradley McGee (AUS)	FDJeux.com	+ 9"
5	Thor Hushovd (NOR)	Crédit Agricole	+ 10"
6	Óscar Pereiro (ESP)	Phonak	+ 11"
7	Jens Voigt (GER)	Team CSC	+ 11"
8	Christophe Moreau (FRA)	Crédit Agricole	+ 12"
9	Bobby Julich (USA)	Team CSC	+ 12"
10	George Hincapie (USA)	U.S. Postal Service	+ 12"

== Stage 1 ==
4 July 2004 — Liège to Charleroi, 202.5 km (125.8 mi)

The stage covered 202.5 km (125.8 mi) from Liège to Charleroi, heading south from Liège before looping back and heading west to the finish. The first third of the route included three cat-4 climbs and there were a cat-3 and a cat-4 climb around the middle of the course. For the Tour the course was almost flat and a mass sprint was expected at the finish. The weather was cool and cloudy at the start, later there was rain.

The race had a lively start with a breakaway barely 15 minutes from the start. With various contributors the small group led by less than 20 seconds over the first two climbs. Their lead extended to 1'10" on the third climb and after the first hour of racing the five-strong group was almost 2'30" clear. The main sprinter's teams in the peloton were slow to organise as a number of crashes and other problems delayed their team leaders. The lead peaked at around 3'45" but after 115 km in the lead the breakaways were reeled in by the main group. The sprint teams held the peloton together until the third intermediate sprint at Eghezee. An attack by Jakob Piil and Marc Wauters raced away and they stretched their advantage to over 1'50". But with around 25 km to go riders from Lotto, Fassa Bortolo and other sprinter's teams took to the front of the peloton. The lead of Wauters and Piil was slowly reduced until they were caught with less than 2 km to the finish. In a mass sprint veteran Jaan Kirsipuu broke early and held off Robbie McEwen to win by the smallest of margins. It was his fourth career Tour win. After the time bonuses from intermediate sprints were counted Cancellara remained in yellow, four seconds clear of Hushovd and ten ahead of Armstrong.

Stage 1 result

Rank	Rider	Team	Time
1	Jaan Kirsipuu (EST)	AG2R Prévoyance	4h 40' 29"
2	Robbie McEwen (AUS)	Lotto–Domo	s.t.
3	Thor Hushovd (NOR)	Crédit Agricole	s.t.
4	Danilo Hondo (GER)	Gerolsteiner	s.t.
5	Jean-Patrick Nazon (FRA)	AG2R Prévoyance	s.t.
6	Baden Cooke (AUS)	FDJeux.com	s.t.
7	Kurt Asle Arvesen (NOR)	Team CSC	s.t.
8	Alessandro Petacchi (ITA)	Fassa Bortolo	s.t.
9	Erik Zabel (GER)	T-Mobile Team	s.t.
10	Allan Davis (AUS)	Liberty Seguros	s.t.

General classification after stage 1

Rank	Rider	Team	Time
1	Fabian Cancellara (SUI)	Fassa Bortolo	4h 47' 11"
2	Thor Hushovd (NOR)	Crédit Agricole	+ 4"
~~3~~	~~Lance Armstrong (USA)~~	~~U.S. Postal Service~~	~~+ 10"~~
4	Jens Voigt (GER)	Team CSC	+ 15"
5	José Iván Gutiérrez (ESP)	Illes Balears–Banesto	+ 16"
6	Óscar Pereiro (ESP)	Phonak	+ 19"
7	Christophe Moreau (FRA)	Crédit Agricole	+ 20"
8	Bobby Julich (USA)	Team CSC	+ 20"
9	George Hincapie (USA)	U.S. Postal Service	+ 20"
10	José Enrique Gutiérrez (ESP)	Phonak	+ 22"

== Stage 2 ==
5 July 2004 — Charleroi to Namur, 197 km (122.4 mi)

The stage was 197 km. Namur, the Walloon capital, is to the east of Charleroi and only 30 km away. The route of the race described a rough square to the west, with both cities in the top east corner. Again the route was mostly flat, marked by only two cat-4 climbs, so a mass sprint finish was almost certain. The race started in clouds but ended in sunshine.

The race began with a number of early attacks and after the first climb at 7 km a group of six riders slipped away. Their lead grew quickly and by 40 km raced they were over four minutes clear and were working hard together. The lead peaked at 5', but the sprinter teams Quick-Step and Crédit Agricole finally began to push the pace in the peloton. The lead group held on, their time falling slowly, but as other teams took a turn their advantage fell away and they were caught with 23 km to go. Despite the remaining distance the peloton was held together by Quickstep and later Fassa Bortolo. The mass sprint ended in a clear victory for Robbie McEwen, second – despite breaking his bike at 20 km to go – was Thor Hushovd. With the 12" time bonus for his position the Norwegian National Champion took the maillot jaune, the first Norwegian to ever wear it. There were a number of crashes during the race and Gian Matteo Fagnini broke his collarbone and was forced to withdraw.

Stage 2 result

Rank	Rider	Team	Time
1	Robbie McEwen (AUS)	Lotto–Domo	4h 18' 39"
2	Thor Hushovd (NOR)	Crédit Agricole	s.t.
3	Jean-Patrick Nazon (FRA)	AG2R Prévoyance	s.t.
4	Danilo Hondo (GER)	Gerolsteiner	s.t.
5	Stuart O'Grady (AUS)	Cofidis	s.t.
6	Jaan Kirsipuu (EST)	AG2R Prévoyance	s.t.
7	Erik Zabel (GER)	T-Mobile Team	s.t.
8	Alessandro Petacchi (ITA)	Fassa Bortolo	s.t.
9	Gerrit Glomser (AUT)	Saeco	s.t.
10	Mario Cipollini (ITA)	Domina Vacanze	s.t.

General classification after stage 2

Rank	Rider	Team	Time
1	Thor Hushovd (NOR)	Crédit Agricole	9h 05' 42"
2	Fabian Cancellara (SUI)	Fassa Bortolo	+ 8"
3	Robbie McEwen (AUS)	Lotto–Domo	+ 17"
~~4~~	~~Lance Armstrong (USA)~~	~~U.S. Postal Service~~	~~+ 18"~~
5	Jens Voigt (GER)	Team CSC	+ 23"
6	José Iván Gutiérrez (ESP)	Illes Balears–Banesto	+ 24"
7	Óscar Pereiro (ESP)	Phonak	+ 27"
8	Christophe Moreau (FRA)	Crédit Agricole	+ 28"
9	Bobby Julich (USA)	Team CSC	+ 28"
10	George Hincapie (USA)	U.S. Postal Service	+ 28"

== Stage 3 ==
6 July 2004 — Waterloo to Wasquehal, 210 km (130.5 mi)

This was another fairly flat stage, of 210 km, tending south before turning west and leading the Tour out of Belgium and into France. The two categorized climbs, a cat-3 and a cat-4, included the well-known Muur of Geraardsbergen of the Tour of Flanders. Part of the stage also included the notorious pavé of the Paris–Roubaix Classic for the first time on the Tour since 1983. The two stretches of narrow cobbled streets totaling just 4 km, but were certainly the most 'ominous' feature of the course. The weather was warm and dry.

After another retirement, that of Frédéric Bessy (Cofidis), 185 riders started. As on the previous two days there was a very early attack, this time by Jens Voigt and Bram de Groot. Again as on the first two stages, the escapers quickly stretched their advantage, leading by 4'30" at the 25 km mark. The lead rose to 6'10" just after the first sprint (Meerbeke at 42 km). After the Muur de Geraardsbergen the peloton, led by Crédit Agricole, started to push the pace but the leaders held out and even increased their lead. As the pavé at Erre approached (146 km) and the race leaders held a 5'45" advantage the 'pushing' for the head of the peloton began. This led to a nasty crash involving Iban Mayo, considered one of Armstrong's major competitors in this Tour, 2 km before the pavé. Armstrong used this opportunity to have his team launch an attack, and the peloton broke into two large groups. The push at Erre slashed at the lead of Voight and De Groot, it also put Armstrong, Ullrich, Zabel and ninety or so others in a group ahead of the main peloton and the yellow jersey. With 50 km to go the leading pair had 1' advantage over the nearest chasers, but almost 3' over the main pack. US Postal pushed hard to maximise their advantage and finally, at 163 km raced, Voight and De Groot were caught, the main group still lagging 1'50" behind. The leading group rattled over the second section of pavé with trouble and took their lead over the yellow jersey to 2'30". There were a series of attacks off the front of the leading group but there were enough sprinter's teams to close them down. In the final race for the line McEwen kicked early but Jean-Patrick Nazon and Erik Zabel slipped by to take first and second. The second group, with Mayo and Thor Hushovd, who wore the yellow jersey coming into the stage, came in 3'53" behind – enough back to end Mayo's hopes of a victory. With the time bonuses McEwen took over the yellow and green jerseys, the yellow for the first time in his career.

Stage 3 result

Rank	Rider	Team	Time
1	Jean-Patrick Nazon (FRA)	AG2R Prévoyance	4h 36' 45"
2	Erik Zabel (GER)	T-Mobile Team	s.t.
3	Robbie McEwen (AUS)	Lotto–Domo	s.t.
4	Tom Boonen (BEL)	Quick-Step–Davitamon	s.t.
5	Kim Kirchen (LUX)	Fassa Bortolo	s.t.
6	Danilo Hondo (GER)	Gerolsteiner	s.t.
7	Jaan Kirsipuu (EST)	AG2R Prévoyance	s.t.
8	Alessandro Bertolini (ITA)	Alessio–Bianchi	s.t.
9	Fabio Baldato (ITA)	Alessio–Bianchi	s.t.
10	José Enrique Gutiérrez (ESP)	Phonak	s.t.

General classification after Stage 3

Rank	Rider	Team	Time
1	Robbie McEwen (AUS)	Lotto–Domo	13h 42' 34"
2	Fabian Cancellara (SUI)	Fassa Bortolo	+ 1"
3	Jens Voigt (GER)	Team CSC	+ 9"
4	Jean-Patrick Nazon (FRA)	AG2R Prévoyance	+ 12"
~~5~~	~~Lance Armstrong (USA)~~	~~U.S. Postal Service~~	~~+ 16"~~
6	Danilo Hondo (GER)	Gerolsteiner	+ 22"
7	Erik Zabel (GER)	T-Mobile Team	+ 23"
8	José Enrique Gutiérrez (ESP)	Phonak	+ 23"
9	Levi Leipheimer (USA)	Rabobank	+ 24"
10	Óscar Pereiro (ESP)	Phonak	+ 25"

== Stage 4 ==
7 July 2004 — Cambrai to Arras, 64.5 km (40.1 mi) (TTT)

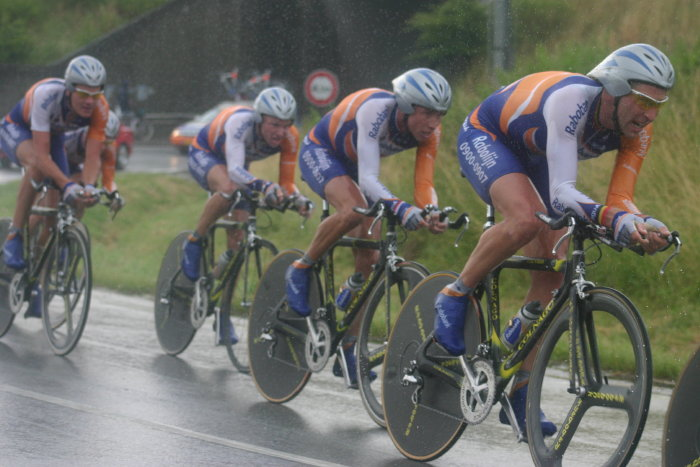
The Rabobank team struggles to a sixth-place finish in the team time trial. The wet and grueling conditions made the course hazardous.

This 64.5 km stage was the team time trial, an event with some vociferous critics. This year, new rules were introduced for this stage to reduce the impact on the lighter-weight climbing teams. Under the new rules, the second place team would not receive a time penalty more than 20 seconds slower than the first place team for the purposes of the general classification. The third place team would not receive more than 30 seconds loss to that of the first, the fourth place 40 seconds, and so on to a maximum time deficit of three minutes. The course for the time trial had numerous gentle slopes, none of which merited a category. The day started dry but heavy rain quickly picked up.

As expected, despite a slow start (5th after first time check), US Postal won the stage – putting Armstrong in yellow, filling six of the top seven overall places with his colleagues, and, remarkably, giving the top three places in the general classification to Americans (Armstrong, George Hincaple, and Floyd Landis). The results were good news for Armstrong, giving him a 36-second lead on Tyler Hamilton, a 55-second lead on Jan Ullrich, and, of course, giving him a yellow jersey, albeit one he was not expected to try to defend in the short term. Their only stress was dropping Benjamin Noval, who was shaken up from a crash yesterday – the same one that had brought down Mayo. Noval finished within the minimum time, however, and the Postal squad notably broke off their press interviews to congratulate him at the finish line.

Hamilton's Phonak team also did extremely well, especially considering that by the time they reached the finish line mechanical problems had whittled them down to five riders – the minimum number to receive a time in the team time trial (although all of their riders eventually did finish). Phonak was also hampered by the unusual decision to have Hamilton slow down and wait for Santos González when he had some mechanical trouble. Despite this, they finished second, ahead of Illes Balears in third, and Ullrich's T-Mobile team in fourth.

Fasso Bortolo had a tough day, getting penalized two minutes for infractions – one for pacing themselves off of the team cars, and another for pushing each other for speed, adding another insult to what was shaping up to be a disappointing Tour for Alessandro Petacchi.

Stage 4 result

Rank	Team	Time
1	U.S. Postal Service	1h 12' 03"
2	Phonak	+ 1' 07"
3	Illes Balears–Banesto	+ 1' 15"
4	T-Mobile Team	+ 1' 19"
5	Team CSC	+ 1' 46"
6	Rabobank	+ 1' 53"
7	Liberty Seguros	+ 2' 25"
8	Euskaltel–Euskadi	+ 2' 35"
9	Saeco	+ 2' 36"
10	Alessio–Bianchi	+ 2' 57"

General classification after stage 4

Rank	Rider	Team	Time
~~1~~	~~Lance Armstrong (USA)~~	~~U.S. Postal Service~~	~~14h 54' 53"~~
2	George Hincapie (USA)	U.S. Postal Service	+ 10"
3	Floyd Landis (USA)	U.S. Postal Service	+ 16"
4	José Azevedo (POR)	U.S. Postal Service	+ 22"
5	José Luis Rubiera (ESP)	U.S. Postal Service	+ 24"
6	José Enrique Gutiérrez (ESP)	Phonak	+ 27"
7	Viatcheslav Ekimov (RUS)	U.S. Postal Service	+ 30"
8	Tyler Hamilton (USA)	Phonak	+ 36"
9	Santos González (ESP)	Phonak	+ 37"
10	Bert Grabsch (GER)	Phonak	+ 41"

== Stage 5 ==
8 July 2004 — Amiens to Chartres, 200.5 km (124.6 mi)

The bad storms from stage four continued, with fierce crosswinds, adding the potential for drama to a stage that was otherwise basically a straight, flat ride to Chartres. An early break at 12 km got 15' ahead, when a crash with around 90 km to go slowed the peloton as they let the fallen riders catch up. That let the breakaway get to 17'30" ahead, and it was clear that they weren't going to be caught. Another crash at 30 km to go took out Robbie McEwen, adding to an already lousy day for the Australian, who was losing a lot of ground to Stuart O'Grady, who was racking up points for the green jersey. The breakaway crossed the line well ahead of the peloton following a brutal series of attacks among the five riders, including Thomas Voeckler, who began the stage three minutes behind Armstrong, and who was thus clearly going to end up in the yellow jersey.

The peloton eventually closed the gap to 12'36". Voeckler, who came in fourth, moved from 59th to 1st in the general classification, taking the yellow jersey from Armstrong with a 9'35" lead over Armstrong, and a 3 min 13 s lead over second place Stuart O'Grady, though this was not a particularly bad blow for Armstrong, since Voeckler, despite being the French National Champion, would not prove to be a climber until much later in his career. McEwen held onto the green jersey, but Stuart O'Grady managed an impressive 53 sprinters points, more than doubling his total to 81, and putting him in 6th place for the green.

Bradley McGee, who wore the yellow jersey for the first three days of the 2003 Tour de France, had a tough day, having never quite recovered from a crash on Stage 1. He got dropped off the back of the peloton and eventually dropped out of the tour.

Stage 5 result

Rank	Rider	Team	Time
1	Stuart O'Grady (AUS)	Cofidis	5h 05' 58"
2	Jakob Piil (DEN)	Team CSC	s.t.
3	Sandy Casar (FRA)	FDJeux.com	s.t.
4	Thomas Voeckler (FRA)	Brioches La Boulangère	s.t.
5	Magnus Bäckstedt (SWE)	Alessio–Bianchi	+ 5"
6	Robbie McEwen (AUS)	Lotto–Domo	+ 12' 33"
7	Janek Tombak (EST)	Cofidis	+ 12' 33"
8	Thor Hushovd (NOR)	Crédit Agricole	+ 12' 33"
9	René Haselbacher (AUT)	Gerolsteiner	+ 12' 33"
10	Jean-Patrick Nazon (FRA)	AG2R Prévoyance	+ 12' 33"

General classification after stage 5

Rank	Rider	Team	Time
1	Thomas Voeckler (FRA)	Brioches La Boulangère	20h 03' 49"
2	Stuart O'Grady (AUS)	Cofidis	+ 3' 13"
3	Sandy Casar (FRA)	FDJeux.com	+ 4' 06"
4	Magnus Bäckstedt (SWE)	Alessio–Bianchi	+ 6' 06"
5	Jakob Piil (DEN)	Team CSC	+ 6' 58"
~~6~~	~~Lance Armstrong (USA)~~	~~U.S. Postal Service~~	~~+ 9' 35"~~
7	George Hincapie (USA)	U.S. Postal Service	+ 9' 45"
8	Floyd Landis (USA)	U.S. Postal Service	+ 9' 51"
9	José Azevedo (POR)	U.S. Postal Service	+ 9' 57"
10	José Luis Rubiera (ESP)	U.S. Postal Service	+ 9' 59"

== Stage 6 ==
9 July 2004 — Bonneval to Angers, 196 km (121.8 mi)

With no hills at all, this was, from the start, clearly going to be a day for the sprinters. The day began with the announcement that both Alessandro Petacchi and Mario Cipollini had dropped out of the race, Petacchi due to injury on Stage 5, Cipollini due to an injury on Stage 3 that had reopened. Neither had won any stages.

Near the start of the stage, a number of riders crashed, including Lance Armstrong; however, all involved in this crash were able to rejoin the peloton. An early break got caught late, with the last rider being pulled back to the peloton with 2 km to go. A massive pileup at the 1 km mark, however, split the peloton, leaving only a handful of riders with any chance of winning. Young Belgian Tom Boonen took it clearly, with Stuart O'Grady in second. Robbie McEwen was hurt in the crash and limped in towards the finish, getting no sprinters points today. This meant that O'Grady's second-place finish, with its associated 30 points, was enough to put him in green. The overall standings remained unchanged, save for O'Grady closing 12 seconds on Voeckler from his time bonus.

Stage 6 result

Rank	Rider	Team	Time
1	Tom Boonen (BEL)	Quick-Step–Davitamon	4h 33' 41"
2	Stuart O'Grady (AUS)	Cofidis	s.t.
3	Erik Zabel (GER)	T-Mobile Team	s.t.
4	Danilo Hondo (GER)	Gerolsteiner	s.t.
5	Baden Cooke (AUS)	FDJeux.com	s.t.
6	Sergio Marinangeli (ITA)	Domina Vacanze	s.t.
7	Jérôme Pineau (FRA)	Brioches La Boulangère	s.t.
8	Julian Dean (NZL)	Crédit Agricole	s.t.
9	Janek Tombak (EST)	Cofidis	s.t.
10	Samuel Dumoulin (FRA)	Decathlon CMA CGM Team	s.t.

General classification after stage 6

Rank	Rider	Team	Time
1	Thomas Voeckler (FRA)	Brioches La Boulangère	24h 37' 30"
2	Stuart O'Grady (AUS)	Cofidis	+ 3' 01"
3	Sandy Casar (FRA)	FDJeux.com	+ 4' 06"
4	Magnus Bäckstedt (SWE)	Alessio–Bianchi	+ 6' 06"
5	Jakob Piil (DEN)	Team CSC	+ 6' 58"
~~6~~	~~Lance Armstrong (USA)~~	~~U.S. Postal Service~~	~~+ 9' 35"~~
7	George Hincapie (USA)	U.S. Postal Service	+ 9' 45"
8	Floyd Landis (USA)	U.S. Postal Service	+ 9' 51"
9	José Azevedo (POR)	U.S. Postal Service	+ 9' 57"
10	José Luis Rubiera (ESP)	U.S. Postal Service	+ 9' 59"

== Stage 7 ==
10 July 2004 — Châteaubriant to Saint-Brieuc, 204.5 km (127.1 mi)

On the last day for the sprinters before the mountains get started, the major battle was set to be between McEwen and O'Grady for the green jersey, and it didn't disappoint. The first hour or so of racing consisted of a series of failed breaks as the peloton rocketed along at an average speed of 50 km/h. After about an hour, a two-man break consisting of Erik Dekker, who had already won four Tour stages in previous years, and Thierry Marichal shot off and held on for most of the race. The two riders came to a sort of a compromise, with Marichal taking first in the sprint checkpoints, and Dekker taking first in both of the checkpoints for the King of the Mountains competition. Meanwhile, back in the peloton, Bobby Julich's CSC team attacked with 50 km to go, splitting the peloton. The main contenders all managed to hold on in the front group, though, and eventually the peloton would reconvene.

The pair was finally brought in by the CSC-led chase around 31 km from the finish, and only a few kilometers later CSC led another attack when Jacob Piil broke off the front, joined by three other riders. With 8.5 km to go, they were brought in only to have another break of seven take off. That one survived to the end, but with 2 km to go three riders took off from that, and managed to hold it to the end, with the stage win going to Italian Filippo Pozzato. Back in the peloton, though, O'Grady managed to sneak in ahead of McEwen, making up for the four points McEwen took on him in the intermediate sprints, and holding onto the green jersey for another day, this time by a razor-thin one point. The overall standings remained unchanged among the major competitors.

Stage 7 result

Rank	Rider	Team	Time
1	Filippo Pozzato (ITA)	Fassa Bortolo	4h 31' 34"
2	Iker Flores (ESP)	Euskaltel–Euskadi	s.t.
3	Francisco Mancebo (ESP)	Illes Balears–Banesto	s.t.
4	Laurent Brochard (FRA)	AG2R Prévoyance	+ 10"
5	Sébastien Hinault (FRA)	Crédit Agricole	+ 10"
6	Michele Scarponi (ITA)	Domina Vacanze	+ 10"
7	Paolo Bettini (ITA)	Quick-Step–Davitamon	+ 10"
8	Thor Hushovd (NOR)	Crédit Agricole	+ 10"
9	Scott Sunderland (AUS)	Alessio–Bianchi	+ 10"
10	Stuart O'Grady (AUS)	Cofidis	+ 10"

General classification after stage 7

Rank	Rider	Team	Time
1	Thomas Voeckler (FRA)	Brioches La Boulangère	29h 09' 14"
2	Stuart O'Grady (AUS)	Cofidis	+ 3' 01"
3	Sandy Casar (FRA)	FDJeux.com	+ 4' 06"
4	Magnus Bäckstedt (SWE)	Alessio–Bianchi	+ 6' 06"
5	Jakob Piil (DEN)	Team CSC	+ 6' 58"
~~6~~	~~Lance Armstrong (USA)~~	~~U.S. Postal Service~~	~~+ 9' 35"~~
7	George Hincapie (USA)	U.S. Postal Service	+ 9' 45"
8	Floyd Landis (USA)	U.S. Postal Service	+ 9' 51"
9	José Azevedo (POR)	U.S. Postal Service	+ 9' 57"
10	José Luis Rubiera (ESP)	U.S. Postal Service	+ 9' 59"

== Stage 8 ==
11 July 2004 — Lamballe to Quimper, 168 km (104.4 mi)

Today was a shorter stage, only 168 km, with more climbs than the past few days – three category four climbs and a category three. After yesterday's constant attacks, though, the pack took it slower and easier. A three-man break took off at 16 km, containing, predictably, Jacob Piil, as well as Matteo Tosatto and Ronny Scholz. Karsten Kroon joined them, but early on got a flat tire and was swallowed by the peloton.

The breakaway was caught with 9 km to go, and the peloton remained solid through to the finish. As with many of the stages this year, there was a crash towards the end, this time at the back of the peloton, caused by a dog running across the road. It didn't slow things down much, though, and the peloton continued to the line, Thor Hushovd taking the sprint. Robbie McEwen took fourth, ahead of O'Grady's eighth, and claimed the green jersey. The general classification remained unchanged as the riders head into the first of two rest days before starting through the mountains in Stage 9.

Stage 8 result

Rank	Rider	Team	Time
1	Thor Hushovd (NOR)	Crédit Agricole	3h 54' 22"
2	Kim Kirchen (LUX)	Fassa Bortolo	s.t.
3	Erik Zabel (GER)	T-Mobile Team	s.t.
4	Robbie McEwen (AUS)	Lotto–Domo	s.t.
5	Andreas Klöden (GER)	T-Mobile Team	s.t.
6	Tom Boonen (BEL)	Quick-Step–Davitamon	s.t.
7	Laurent Brochard (FRA)	Decathlon CMA CGM Team	s.t.
8	Stuart O'Grady (AUS)	Cofidis	s.t.
9	Óscar Pereiro (ESP)	Phonak	s.t.
10	Danilo Hondo (GER)	Gerolsteiner	s.t.

General classification after stage 8

Rank	Rider	Team	Time
1	Thomas Voeckler (FRA)	Brioches La Boulangère	33h 03' 36"
2	Stuart O'Grady (AUS)	Cofidis	+ 3' 01"
3	Sandy Casar (FRA)	FDJeux.com	+ 4' 06"
4	Magnus Bäckstedt (SWE)	Alessio–Bianchi	+ 6' 27"
5	Jakob Piil (DEN)	Team CSC	+ 7' 09"
~~6~~	~~Lance Armstrong (USA)~~	~~U.S. Postal Service~~	~~+ 9' 35"~~
7	George Hincapie (USA)	U.S. Postal Service	+ 9' 45"
8	José Azevedo (POR)	U.S. Postal Service	+ 9' 57"
9	José Enrique Gutiérrez (ESP)	Phonak	+ 10' 02"
10	Erik Zabel (GER)	T-Mobile Team	+ 10' 06"

== Stage 9 ==
13 July 2004 — Saint-Léonard-de-Noblat to Guéret, 160.5 km (99.7 mi)

This 160.5 km stage was another with more hills after a two-day rest, although only two were categorized and a sprinters' finish was expected. This was the last stage before some big climbs so the balance was between 'resting' for the following day and a last chance for sprinters. The weather was, at last, warm with temperatures up to 25 °C.

The race began with a few early escape attempts, with groups of from one and eight riders breaking and being caught within the first 20 km. The attacks continued but the peloton maintained a high pace with US Postal at the front. Jaan Kirsipuu was dropped from the peloton and abandoned the race. At about 38 km raced Iñigo Landaluze managed to get away, he was chased and caught by Filippo Simeoni and the duo pulled out their lead. A number of riders attempted to join them but none made it across the gap, although Karsten Kroon spent a long time alone between the two groups before giving up the solo chase on the second climb, the Cote d'Aubusson.

With 100 km to the finish the two leaders were almost 2 min 30 s clear and the peloton slowed a little. The leaders' advantage rapidly increased, rising by over four minutes in the next 25 km and peaked at 10 min 05 s when the peloton reached the second climb. After the climb the riders of Crédit Agricole, Lotto–Domo and Quickstep came to the front of the peloton and raised the pace.

The lead fell slowly, with 44 km to go they were still 6 min 10 s ahead. With 25 km to the finish they still had a little under four minutes in hand, with 15 km just two minutes, 10 km 1 min 25 s, 5 km just 40 seconds. With just the final kilometre to race Landaluze and Simeoni were swept up, they had started playing tactical games for the final lead out and the sprinters just blew past them. In the sprint for the line Robbie McEwen just edged out Thor Hushovd and Stuart O'Grady. McEwen now had an 18-point lead in the green jersey clash.

Stage 9 result

Rank	Rider	Team	Time
1	Robbie McEwen (AUS)	Lotto–Domo	3h 32' 55"
2	Thor Hushovd (NOR)	Crédit Agricole	s.t.
3	Stuart O'Grady (AUS)	Cofidis	s.t.
4	Jérôme Pineau (FRA)	Brioches La Boulangère	s.t.
5	Erik Zabel (GER)	T-Mobile Team	s.t.
6	Janek Tombak (EST)	Cofidis	s.t.
7	Tom Boonen (BEL)	Quick-Step–Davitamon	s.t.
8	Danilo Hondo (GER)	Gerolsteiner	s.t.
9	Sergio Marinangeli (ITA)	Domina Vacanze	s.t.
10	Iñigo Landaluze (ESP)	Euskaltel–Euskadi	s.t.

General classification after stage 9

Rank	Rider	Team	Time
1	Thomas Voeckler (FRA)	Brioches La Boulangère	36h 36' 31"
2	Stuart O'Grady (AUS)	Cofidis	+ 2' 53"
3	Sandy Casar (FRA)	FDJeux.com	+ 4' 06"
4	Magnus Bäckstedt (SWE)	Alessio–Bianchi	+ 6' 27"
5	Jakob Piil (DEN)	Team CSC	+ 7' 09"
~~6~~	~~Lance Armstrong (USA)~~	~~U.S. Postal Service~~	~~+ 9' 35"~~
7	George Hincapie (USA)	U.S. Postal Service	+ 9' 45"
8	José Azevedo (POR)	U.S. Postal Service	+ 9' 57"
9	José Enrique Gutiérrez (ESP)	Phonak	+ 10' 02"
10	Erik Zabel (GER)	T-Mobile Team	+ 10' 06"
