= Marinangeli =

Marinangeli is an Italian surname. Notable people with the surname include:

- Marco Marinangeli (born 1965), Italian composer, songwriter, arranger, orchestrator, and producer
- Nicola Marinangeli (born 2003), Italian racing driver
- Sergio Marinangeli (born 1980), Italian cyclist
