= 2004 Tour de France =

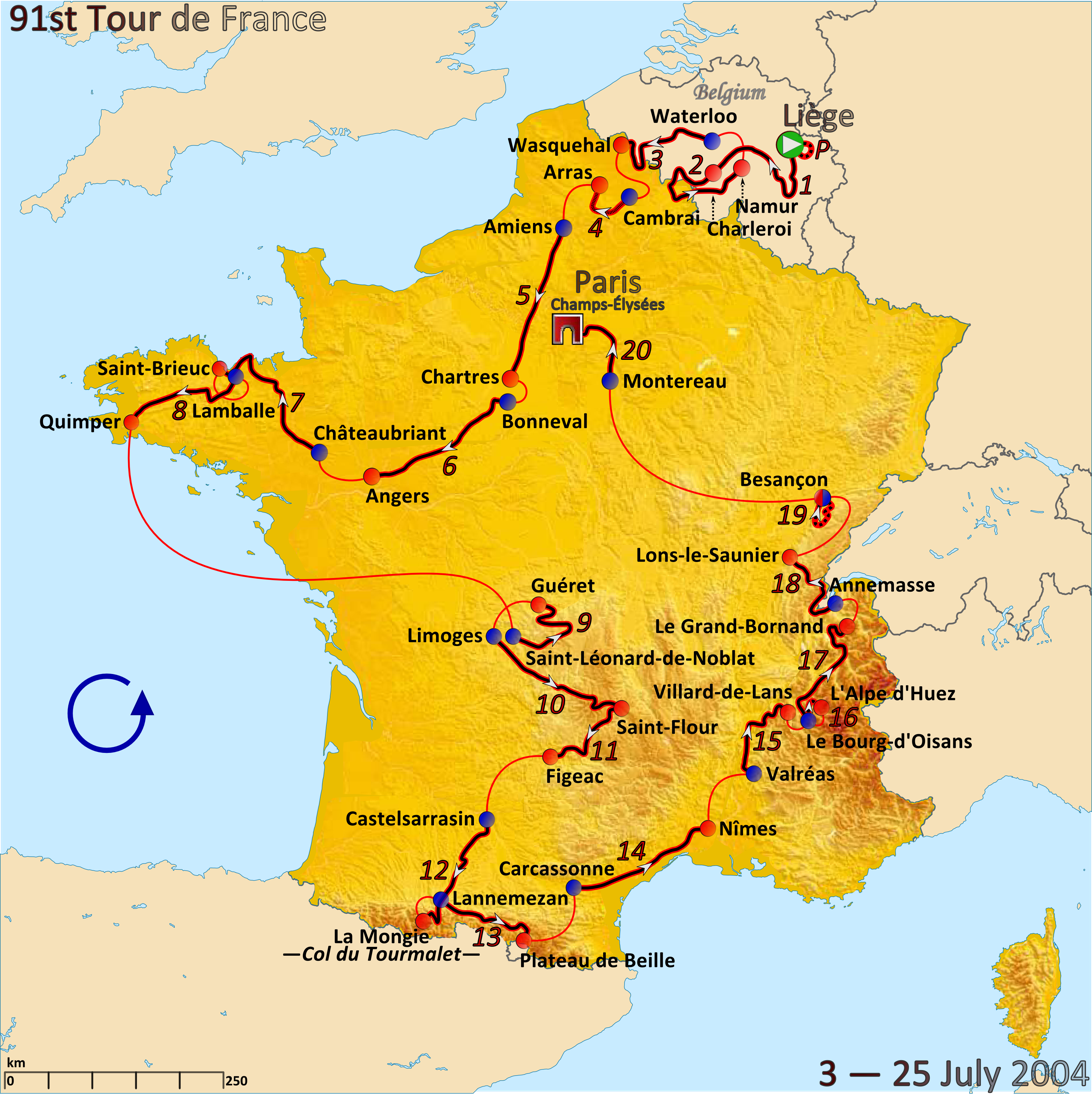
- Route of the 2004 Tour de France

Race details
- Dates: 3–25 July 2004
- Stages: 20 + Prologue
- Distance: 3,391 km (2,107 mi)
- Winning time: 83h 36' 02"

Results
	Winner	~~Lance Armstrong~~ none (Note: On 24 August 2012, the United States Anti-Doping Agency announced that they had disqualified Armstrong from all his results since 1998, including his victory in the 2004 Tour de France. The Union Cycliste Internationale, responsible for the international cycling, confirmed this verdict on 22 October 2012.)	
	Second	Andreas Klöden (GER)	(T-Mobile Team)
	Third	Ivan Basso (ITA)	(Team CSC)
Jersey awarded to the points classification winner	Points	Robbie McEwen (AUS)	(Lotto–Domo)
Jersey awarded to the mountains classification winner	Mountains	Richard Virenque (FRA)	(Quick-Step–Davitamon)
Jersey awarded to the youth classification winner	Youth	Vladimir Karpets (RUS)	(Illes Balears–Banesto)
Jersey awarded to the combativity classification winner	Combativity	Richard Virenque (FRA)	(Quick-Step–Davitamon)
	Team	T-Mobile Team	

The 2004 Tour de France was a multiple stage bicycle race held from 3 to 25 July, and the 91st edition of the Tour de France. It has no overall winner—although American cyclist Lance Armstrong originally won the event, the United States Anti-Doping Agency announced in August 2012 that they had disqualified Armstrong from all his results since 1998, including his seven Tour de France wins from 1999 to 2005; the Union Cycliste Internationale confirmed the result.

The event consisted of 20 stages over 3,391 km (2,107 mi). Armstrong had been favored to win, his competitors seen as being German Jan Ullrich, Spaniards Roberto Heras and Iban Mayo, and fellow Americans Levi Leipheimer and Tyler Hamilton. A major surprise in the Tour was the performance of French newcomer Thomas Voeckler, who unexpectedly won the yellow jersey as leader of the general classification in the fifth stage and held onto it for ten stages before finally losing it to Armstrong.

This Tour saw the mistreatment of Filippo Simeoni by Armstrong on Stage 18.

The route of the 2004 Tour was remarkable. With two individual time trials scheduled in the last week, one of them the climb of Alpe d'Huez, the directors were hoping for a close race until the end. For the first time in years, the mountains of the Massif Central made an appearance.

== Teams ==
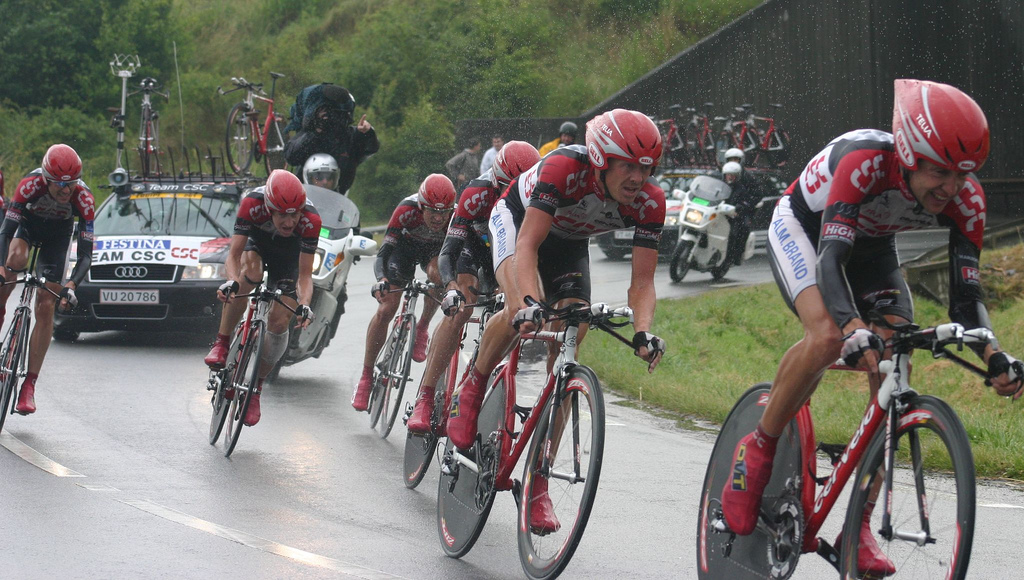
Team CSC during the team time trial on stage four

The first 14 teams in the UCI Road World Rankings at 31 January 2004 were automatically invited. Initially the organisers had an option for a 22nd team, which would be Kelme, but after Jesús Manzano exposed doping use in that team, Kelme was not invited, and the race started with 21 teams of nine cyclists.

The teams entering the race were:

Qualified teams

- Alessio–Bianchi
- Team CSC
- Cofidis
- Euskaltel–Euskadi
- Fassa Bortolo
- FDJeux.com
- Gerolsteiner
- Illes Balears–Banesto
- Liberty Seguros
- Quick-Step–Davitamon
- Rabobank
- Saeco
- T-Mobile Team
- U.S. Postal Service

Invited teams

- AG2R Prévoyance
- Brioches La Boulangère
- Crédit Agricole
- Domina Vacanze
- Lotto–Domo
- Phonak
- R.A.G.T. Semences–MG Rover

== Route and stages ==
The highest point of elevation in the race was 2,000 m (6,600 ft) at the summit of the Col de la Madeleine mountain pass on stage 17.

Stage characteristics and winners
Stage	Date	Course	Distance	Type	Winner
P	3 July	Liège (Belgium)	6.1 km (3.8 mi)	Individual time trial	Fabian Cancellara (SUI)
1	4 July	Liège (Belgium) to Charleroi (Belgium)	202.5 km (125.8 mi)	Plain stage	Jaan Kirsipuu (EST)
2	5 July	Charleroi (Belgium) to Namur (Belgium)	197.0 km (122.4 mi)	Plain stage	Robbie McEwen (AUS)
3	6 July	Waterloo (Belgium) to Wasquehal	210.0 km (130.5 mi)	Plain stage	Jean-Patrick Nazon (FRA)
4	7 July	Cambrai to Arras	64.5 km (40.1 mi)	Team time trial	U.S. Postal Service (USA)
5	8 July	Amiens to Chartres	200.5 km (124.6 mi)	Plain stage	Stuart O'Grady (AUS)
6	9 July	Bonneval to Angers	196.0 km (121.8 mi)	Plain stage	Tom Boonen (BEL)
7	10 July	Châteaubriant to Saint-Brieuc	204.5 km (127.1 mi)	Plain stage	Filippo Pozzato (ITA)
8	11 July	Lamballe to Quimper	168.0 km (104.4 mi)	Plain stage	Thor Hushovd (NOR)
	12 July	Limoges		Rest day	
9	13 July	Saint-Léonard-de-Noblat to Guéret	160.5 km (99.7 mi)	Plain stage	Robbie McEwen (AUS)
10	14 July	Limoges to Saint-Flour	237.0 km (147.3 mi)	Hilly stage	Richard Virenque (FRA)
11	15 July	Saint-Flour to Figeac	164.0 km (101.9 mi)	Hilly stage	David Moncoutié (FRA)
12	16 July	Castelsarrasin to La Mongie	197.5 km (122.7 mi)	Mountain stage	Ivan Basso (ITA)
13	17 July	Lannemezan to Plateau de Beille	205.5 km (127.7 mi)	Mountain stage	~~Lance Armstrong~~ (USA)
14	18 July	Carcassonne to Nîmes	192.5 km (119.6 mi)	Plain stage	Aitor González (ESP)
	19 July	Nîmes		Rest day	
15	20 July	Valréas to Villard-de-Lans	180.5 km (112.2 mi)	Mountain stage	~~Lance Armstrong~~ (USA)
16	21 July	Le Bourg-d'Oisans to Alpe d'Huez	15.5 km (9.6 mi)	Individual time trial	~~Lance Armstrong~~ (USA)
17	22 July	Le Bourg-d'Oisans to Le Grand-Bornand	204.5 km (127.1 mi)	Mountain stage	~~Lance Armstrong~~ (USA)
18	23 July	Annemasse to Lons-le-Saunier	166.5 km (103.5 mi)	Hilly stage	Juan Miguel Mercado (ESP)
19	24 July	Besançon to Besançon	55.0 km (34.2 mi)	Individual time trial	~~Lance Armstrong~~ (USA)
20	25 July	Montereau-Fault-Yonne to Paris (Champs-Élysées)	163.0 km (101.3 mi)	Plain stage	Tom Boonen (BEL)
	Total		3,391 km (2,107 mi)		

== Race overview ==
Before the Tour started, British favourite David Millar was in Biarritz, France with David Brailsford, the head coach of Great Britain for the upcoming Athens Olympics, when French police entered the restaurant they were dining in and forced Millar back to his flat and then arrested him on suspicion of doping. He was left off the Olympic team because of the incident, would likely face termination from Team Cofidis and was going to be brought before a French court to answer questions regarding doping in cycling. Team Cofidis had only begun riding again in May, after a self-imposed suspension to conduct an internal doping investigation of their own team.

=== Grand Depart in Belgium and the first week ===
The opening prologue was in Liège Belgium and was 6.1 kilometres long. Fabian Cancellara, riding the first stage of his first Tour, won the stage and therefore the first yellow jersey. Francesco Moser, Dietrich Thurau and Chris Boardman are among other riders to have done this to begin their career. Lance Armstrong finished in 2nd two seconds behind and was therefore the highest GC contender. The closest contenders to him were Levi Leipheimer and Jan Ullrich. The two riders who defeated Armstrong in the recently held 2004 Critérium du Dauphiné Libéré were Iban Mayo and Tyler Hamilton, both of whom were considered potential challengers. Hamilton finished +0:16 behind Armstrong and Mayo was +0:19 slower. Gilberto Simoni of Team Saeco, who had won two of the previous four Giro's and podiumed five of the previous six had a tough day and finished +0:42 behind Cancellara. This Tour would end up being the best finish of his career, but in part due to this tough start he would not be a threat to the elite riders for the remainder of the race.

Stage 1 was a flat stage that was run entirely in Belgium and not long into the stage it began to rain heavily which would eventually be responsible for many crashes. 37 year old elite sprinter Mario Cipollini went down and had a difficult time getting back to the main pack and was not among the riders fighting for the stage win. The final breakaway was caught with 4 km to go and the stage was won by Jaan Kirsipuu of AG2R Prévoyance ahead of Robbie McEwen of Lotto–Domo and Thor Hushovd of Crédit Agricole. During this stage Lance Armstrong wore the green jersey for the only time in his career, being placed 2nd in the points competition behind Cancellara. During stage 2 the weather wasn't as severe but there were still several crashes which resulted in the abandonment of a few riders. Marco Velo crashed violently, broke his collarbone and when he hit the ground landed on a glass bottle which cut his other shoulder open. He would continue the race but only survived a few more stages before calling it quits. A breakaway of five riders eventually went clear and Team Fassa Bortolo tried controlling the escape in a manner similar to what they had done during the Giro a few months earlier where they were able to get sprinter Alessandro Petacchi in position to win an astonishing nine stages. They also were intent on protecting the yellow jersey of Cancellara as long as they could, however they were not able to control the Tour as they had done at the Giro and even though they were in good position as the end of the stage neared Cancellara had lost his yellow jersey and Petacchi finished 8th in the sprint. McEwen had won the sprint, attacking with 250 meters to go as Hushovd took 2nd place, but also moved into the yellow jersey as a result of the bonus seconds he won. This made him the first rider from Norway to lead the Tour de France.

Stage 3 would begin in Waterloo, Belgium and end just over the border in Wasquehal in Hauts-de-France. For the first time since the 1985 Tour de France a stage which included sections traversed during Paris–Roubaix was included. There were some sections of cobbles, but it was limited to only about four kilometres in two segments. A two rider breakaway of Jens Voigt of Team Team CSC and Bram de Groot of Team Rabobank eventually got a gap of nearly seven minutes before it started coming down. The pavé did cause some flat tires and crashes, including GC favorite Iban Mayo of Euskaltel–Euskadi, who crashed hard, shredding some of his uniform and costing him so much time he likely lost any chance of competing for victory. Christophe Moreau, GC rider for Team Credit Agricole who had finished in the top ten twice in recent years also got caught out in the peloton split and lost nearly four minutes. Thor Hushovd was stuck back in this group meaning he would likely lose his yellow and green jerseys. Roberto Heras of Team Liberty Seguros, who was an instrumental Lieutenant of Armstrong in previous Tour victories and himself a multi-time champion of the Vuelta a España, also had a tough time through the cobbles but he was able to fight his way back to the elite group. The two man breakaway was eventually caught but Jens Voight was able to finish in the group containing the GC riders. The stage was won by Jean-Patrick Nazon of Team AG2R who bested Erik Zabel of T-Mobile Team in the sprint. Robbie McEwen finished 3rd but moved into both the yellow and green jerseys.

Stage 4 was a team time trial (TTT) but there were new rules written regarding how much time could be lost by riders. The most any team could lose to the winning team was +3:00. The most the 2nd place team could lose was +0:20 and 3rd place would only lose +0:30. Some riders complained that their teams had worked hard to master the TTT and felt that time losses should be just as severe as they can be during an ITT. The TTT was dominated by Team U.S. Postal Service. George Hincapie rode at the front near the end and when the finish line approached and they knew the race had been won they pulled up and celebrated while crossing the line. Team Phonak of Tyler Hamilton finished 2nd +1:07 behind. Phonak, who was riding in their first Tour as a team had a tough start to the stage and had only five riders remaining, the amount required to finish, with 15 km still remaining. Despite this Hamilton rode a high pace at the front and the team still finished strongly having the best time when they crossed the line. Team Illes Balears–Banesto finished 3rd at +1:15 and the T-Mobile team of Ullrich and Andreas Klöden finished 4th. Team CSC of Ivan Basso finished in 5th place, and even though Team FDJeux.com started five minutes before Team CSC, they actually caught up to the FDJ riders, who finished in last place. As a result, the general classification shifted to Armstrong taking over the maillot jaune and the next places being taken by his teammates Hincapie, Landis, Azevedo and Chechu Rubiera making up the new top 5. The closest GC riders to Armstrong were Hamilton in 8th at +0:36 and Ullrich, Kloden and Bobby Julich of Team CSC about a minute behind. The green jersey was kept by McEwen, Paolo Bettini of Team Quick-Step–Davitamon kept the polka dot jersey and the white jersey of the best young rider was worn by Matthias Kessler of T-Mobile. Stage 5 was the 60th day Lance Armstrong had worn the yellow jersey, tying him with Miguel Induráin for the 3rd most all time. A five rider breakaway got a massive gap during this stage and the US Postal team of Armstrong did nothing to prevent or reduce their advantage during the escape. Stuart O'Grady of Team Cofidis, Jakob Piil of Team CSC, Sandy Casar of Team FDJ, Thomas Voeckler of Team Brioches La Boulangère and Magnus Bäckstedt of Team Alessio–Bianchi eventually built a gap approaching +17:00. They would finish in that order about +12:30 ahead of the main field and all five of them would make up the new top 5 overall. Being as Voeckler was the highest placed among them he moved into the yellow jersey, +9:35 ahead of 6th place Armstrong.

33 drug tests were conducted following the stage. Every rider tested produced a negative result, meaning all 33 riders would be cleared to sign in and start stage 6. Earlier in the year the book L.A. Confidentiel was released which claimed there was doping going on at the highest levels. Emma O'Reilly was a primary source for this book. She was paid a reasonable fee and confessed to some of the relatively minor things she had seen while working for Team US Postal, because she was worried some younger riders elsewhere in the sport may have died as a result of doping gone wrong.

Prior to the start of stage 6 Alessandro Petacchi, Bradley McGee and Mario Cipollini abandoned the Tour. Crashes earlier in the tour hindered them and the flat stages were all but over in this year's edition. 2004 was the eighth Tour de France Cipollini entered in his career and he abandoned every single one of them. He did however, win a total of twelve stages. During stage 6 riders formed a breakaway but never extended their gap much beyond +5:00 and weren't expected to survive to the finish. Impressively with 10 km to go they still had a gap but Credit Agricole, Team Lotto and Team Gerolsteiner were pulling at the front to make sure it would be a sprint finish. With about 5 km to Antonio Flecha of Team Fassa Bortolo, who had been in the breakaway for nearly 170 km, attacked shortly before the peloton caught them and built a bit of a gap. 1 km before the line he too was caught, and he shot back through the ranks as the sprint trains came by. A crash inside the flamme rouge caused McEwen to miss the sprint as Tom Boonen of Team Quick Step defeated O'Grady, who would maintain his narrow lead over the four closest opponents in the points competition. Danilo Hondo of Gerolsteiner and Baden Cooke of FDJ rounded out the top 5. This would be the last stage without a categorized climb for the remainder of the Tour with the exception of stage 14 and the semi-neutralized stage on the Champs-Élysées. Throughout this Tour there would be many crashes and GC favorite Tyler Hamilton went down in stage 6. He didn't lose time but he suffered a lower back injury that would likely cause pain in the coming days. Adding briefly to the psychological stress, he also found out his dog, Tugboat, died.

By stage 7 there had already been 100 riders who had gone down in crashes including most GC contenders. The stage saw a two rider breakaway remain out front until there were about 30 km to go. After that some elements of the peloton were trying to keep the race together while others tried breaking away for the stage win. Towards the end of the stage the powerful riding of Francisco Mancebo of Team Illes Balears was enough open a small gap ahead of the yellow jersey group. Filippo Pozzato of Fassa Bortolo, the youngest rider in the Tour at 22, and Iker Flores of Team Euskaltel were able to hold his wheel until the line where Pozzato pulled around an exhausted Mancebo for the win. In the GC Voekler's lead of +9:35 over Armstrong had not yet begun to come down. Armstrong led by +0:36 over Hamilton, the next closest contender not riding for US Postal. Mancebo jumped ahead of Ullrich and Julich with his late attack and was +0:43 behind Armstrong with Ullrich and Julich being the only other elites within a minute as Basso and Heras were within +2:00.

=== The second week and the Pyrenees ===
Stage 8 had four categorized climbs, all of which were Cat-3 or Cat-4 meaning the stage would likely be decided between a successful breakaway or a sprint finish if all escape attempts could be destroyed. Four riders eventually went away, but one of them Karsten Kroon got a flat and wasn't able to get a new tire in time to re-acquire contact with the break. They would hold out until just under 10 km and around this same time a dog ran into the back half of the peloton and caused a crash. As the finish approached Bettini made a break for the line but was caught, and then Kim Kirchen made a break for it but Thor Hushovd was able to overpower everyone and take the decisive victory ahead of Kirchen, Zabel and McEwen. In the points competition McEwen reclaimed the Maillot Vert. Even though O'Grady, Zabel, Hushovd and Danilo Hondo were all within twenty points of the jersey, McEwen would not relinquish it for the rest of the race. The next day was the first rest day.

Stage 9, just as the day before, saw many escape attempts early in the stage but none materialized. Eventually Iñigo Landaluze of Team Euskaltel–Euskadi and Filippo Simeoni of Team Domina Vacanze got a gap higher than +1:00 and were considered broken away. It is not known if Lance Armstrong was planning to ambush and humiliate Simeoni during this breakaway attempt, or if Armstrong was considering it petty revenge against Simeoni that could only be attempted if the race was well in hand. In regards to comments Simeoni made about Michele Ferrari. Simeoni and Landaluze extended their advantage considerably as Karsten Kroon tried his luck again, hoping to have better luck than yesterday. Kroon rode on his own for much of the stage, staying a few minutes ahead of the peloton, but not able to bridge the gap and join the other two escapees. When it became clear he would not catch them he pulled off to the side of the road, went to the bathroom to kill time until the peloton arrived, and then rejoined the pack. Meanwhile, Simeoni pulled hard for much of the stage, with Landaluze on his wheel. The pair held out all day but Simeoni was not going to allow Landaluze to come around him and steal the victory after he just did all the work so he stopped working as hard and just before the line the pair got swooped up by the sprinters operating at maximum speed. Simeoni and Landaluze finished inside the top 20 as McEwen won the day with Hushovd and O'Grady rounding out the podium.

Stage 10 was Bastille Day and had eight categorized climbs with one of them being Cat-1 and a pair of Cat-2's meaning the polka dot jersey would likely change hands. Richard Virenque was attempting to break the record he shared with Lucien Van Impe and Federico Bahamontes by winning his 7th King of the mountains competition and he was the first rider to launch an attack. He was joined by Sylvain Chavanel, teammates with Voeckler on Brioches La Boulangère as well as Axel Merckx of Lotto–Domo. Chavanel, like many riders before him was a young rider who was predicted to have a long and successful career. On this day he did not last long and it would end up being Virenque and Merckx who stayed away. Virenque eventually dropped Merckx and went on to win the stage by over +5:00 and take over the polka dot jersey from Paolo Bettini. The GC riders crossed together with no major changes among them, however with his successful attack Virenque moved into 4th some two and a half minutes ahead of Armstrong. At the end of the stage the always emotional Virenque dedicated the stage victory to two people very close to him who had died recently, his grandmother and Joel Chabiron, a team coach of many years who had also gone through the entire Festina affair with him. Stage 11 began much the same way as the previous stage with three riders eventually breaking free. David Moncoutié of Cofidis, Juan Antonio Flecha of Fassa Bortolo and Egoi Martínez of Euskaltel. This breakaway would stay away together all day and eventually be successful. Moucoutié was able to successfully attack Flecha and Martínez with just under 10 km to go. He soloed to victory just over two minutes ahead of the other two escapees. The peloton came across just under six minutes after Moucoutié with no major changes in the overall situation.

In stage 12 Voeckler was expected to lose considerable time if not lose the yellow jersey outright. His defense of the jersey had been admirable but this stage included the Col d'Aspin as well as a Cat-1 version of the Col du Tourmalet with a mountaintop finish at La Mongie. There were several breakaway attempts and going up the Aspin Virenque, Moreau, Simeoni and Michael Rasmussen of Team Rabobank all attacked. On the final climb it was the GC favorites who would produce the winner. As expected Voeckler got dropped, but he did not come entirely unhinged and kept his losses to under four minutes. More surprising was that Ullrich and Julich lost some two and a half minutes and Tyler Hamilton lost three and a half. Carlos Sastre, Ivan Basso and Lance Armstrong were the final riders remaining, but Sastre got dropped leaving Armstrong and Basso to contest the stage win. As the finish line approached Basso jolted ahead to take the win over Armstrong, who had picked up time on all of his other rivals. Armstrong was now in 2nd place having cut Voeckler's lead down to +5:24. Sandy Casar and Jakob Piil, who were part of the Voeckler breakaway, still remained in the top 10 but the closest rivals to Armstrong were Virenque, Klöden, Basso and Mancebo who were about a minute behind him as Julich, Ullrich, Leipheimer and Hamilton were about four minutes behind.

The previous night, Hamilton had a problem with bad blood being given to him while blood doping. He had a bad night, was urinating a colour close to black from all the dead red blood cells, had developed a fever and was nervous to the point he wondered if he might die in his sleep. He asked a team doctor to keep an eye on him while he tried to sleep that night. Luckily the fever broke and he woke up in the morning; and rode as hard as he could during the stage.

Stage 13 would be more high mountains with a Cat-HC mountaintop finish at Plateau de Beille. The race was making its closest approach to Basque Country so the fans were anticipated to be in the hundreds of thousands. 165 riders started the stage meaning 23 riders had abandoned so far. Tyler Hamilton would lose contact less than halfway through the stage and abandon the Tour citing lower back pain. This was his eighth Tour de France entry and the first time he abandoned. Following the stage Urs Freuler, the D.S. of Phonak commented to a Marblehead, Massachusetts magazine reporter, who was there to cover the hometown hero Tyler Hamilton, about Hamilton's withdrawal and because of it, the now dire future for the team for the remainder of the Tour, "Mentally he's 100%.The team morale was not that bad yesterday. Clear we lost the leader and didn't makethe podium, but I thinkthe guys here are goodguys and we change a little bit the strategy and we gonowto try to win a stage." Óscar Pereiro, a young domestique initially riding in support of Hamilton, now became the highest GC rider for Phonak and would end the Tour in 10th. Other abandons by this point in the Tour included Denis Menchov and last year's 5th-place finisher Haimar Zubeldia. His teammate, Iban Mayo, would suffer tremendously during the stage to the point he got off his bike and told the team he was quitting. After a few moments he decided to fight on to and he went up the rest of the climb with two Fassa Bartalo riders. Late in the stage it was once again Basso proving himself to be the only one capable of staying with Armstrong in this second week of racing. José Azevedo of Team U.S. Postal Service broke the majority of the competition before pulling up and turning Armstrong loose against Basso. Georg Totschnig of Gerolsteiner, finished 3rd about a minute behind climbing his way into the top 10 in the process. Near the end of the stage some rowdy and over enthusiastic fans could have caused Armstrong trouble but he managed to deal with the Americans until he was safely inside the barriers where the finish line was. Armstrong won the stage, charging forward with a surge at the end that Basso did not answer. Voeckler once again valiantly fought to stay in contact with the riders above his level. He managed to finish 11th, which was good enough to keep him in the yellow jersey for another day as he now had a +0:22 advantage over Armstrong. Stage 13 was Voeckler's ninth day in yellow, the longest a French rider had worn the leader's jersey since Laurent Fignon in 1989. Armstrong was ahead of Basso by +1:17, Kloden by +2:56, Mancebo by +3:06, then at nearly +6:00 or beyond was Totschnig, Armstrong's lieutenant José Azevedo and Jan Ullrich.

Stage 14 was a return to the flatlands where a group of ten breakaway riders was able to finish some fourteen minutes ahead of the main field. Aitor González of Fassa Bortolo broke free near the end to defeat Nicolas Jalabert, the Phonak rider Freuler sent to attack in their first stage without Hamilton, and Christophe Mengin who rounded out the stage podium. The GC saw no changes. The next day would be the second rest day, prior to going into three high mountain stages in the Alps including a mountain ITT.

==== The third week and the Alps ====
From stage 15 on the Directeur Sportif's began their game of attacks and plans and employing strategies to either win a stage in the Alps, or try to challenge Armstrong. Walter Godefroot of T-Mobile and Bjarne Riis of Team CSC, who among the Omerta code of secrecy within the sport had the nickname of "Mr. Sixty", were the leaders of the only two teams who had realistic hope of challenging Bruyneel and US Postal. Other team managers of note during the Tour included Marc Sergeant and Patrick Lefevere both of whom were in the 2nd year of their two decade runs at Lotto and Quickstep respectively, Eusebio Unzué of Illes Balears who directed Delgado, Induráin and would stay with the team through the Movistar era, "The Iron Sergeant" Giancarlo Ferretti and Jean-René Bernaudeau, who directed Voeckler in this Tour.

Stage 15 was the first of three in the high Alps. The flat start prompted several riders to break away, including those in search of points being as the top 4 riders were still within 20 points of McEwen and even Danilo Hondo in 5th place was within 20 points of 4th place Stuart O'Grady. As the heavy climbing began Floyd Landis did the heavy work at the front of the elite group. Voigt, Virenque, Rasmussen, Leipheimer and Jan Ullrich attacked. As they neared the finish of the final climb the final riders included Armstrong, Basso, Kloden, Ullrich and Leipheimer, who would enter the top 10 at the end of the day. As expected Voeckler finally lost the yellow jersey, but as expected he went down fighting as he did his best to stay in the top 10 overall. In the end Armstrong was the strongest with only Basso with him as he crossed the finish as the T-Mobile Team pair of Ullrich and Kloden crossed a few seconds later.

Later that night Armstrong received death threats targeting him during the time trial the following day when 750,000 fans were expected on and around Alpe d'Huez and crowd control would be, for all intents and purposes, impossible.

During the 1986 Tour de France Greg LeMond, the only other American Tour winner, had to deal with similar threats during his first Tour victory. LeMond suffered from extreme paranoia because he also had to worry about his food being poisoned, his brakes being manipulated, his drug tests being altered, being attacked from within his own team and being pushed off his bike while riding through potentially hostile crowds; many of these warnings coming from the Tour Directeur himself confirming their validity. Armstrong did not have these additional food poisoning, bike manipulation, team rivalry or drug test concerns as severely, being as he had the complete support of US Postal and riders during this era had the protective base of the team bus.

The ITT of stage 16 was held on Alpe d'Huez and would decide whether Basso would set up a final battle with Armstrong on stage 17 or if Armstrong would end the Tour right then and there. There were expected to be 750,000 fans in attendance and each rider would have to ride through the masses of humanity. The bottom half of the standings took to the course and the early times were set but as the top ranked riders started taking to the course the crowds became more unruly, aggressive, angry and excited as the day wore on and more people showed up and crowded their way alongside the road. Despite the conditions, including many riders being spat on and screamed at violently, Armstrong all but ended the Tour when he caught and then dropped Basso, even though Basso had started two minutes before him. Armstrong's time, at the time, was good enough for 2nd on the top 100 times at Alpe d'Huez. Jan Ullrich finished 2nd on the stage, his time good enough for 7th all time. The previous year Armstrong defeated Ullrich by +1:01 in the closest of Armstrong's victories. Armstrong defeated Ullrich by +1:01 in the time trial and finished +2:33 ahead of Basso, who in reality rode a decent time trial considering he finished 8th. Kloden finished 3rd +1:41 behind. Wearing the green jersey Robbie McEwen rode a slow race and there was briefly worry he might miss the time cut and be thrown out of the race. When he realized he made it inside the time cut, he did a wheelie across the finish line. Armstrong now led Basso by just under four minutes and led Kloden by just over five. Both Ullrich and Azevedo jumped over Mancebo as Totschnig remained in 7th.

Stage 17 was the final high mountain stage and finished at Le Grand-Bornand. The Col du Glandon and Col de la Madeleine were the most difficult climbs to be dealt with. Virenque and Moreau went off in search of KOM points, although Virenque was the only rider with a chance of beating the GC riders for the polka dot jersey. Filippo Simeoni attacked as did Gilberto Simoni, Rasmussen, Merckx and several others but in the end it would be the GC elites to fight it out for the win. As the end of the stage neared it was clear that neither Basso, Kloden nor Ullrich had a chance at even making Armstrong nervous let alone threaten him. Floyd Landis did much of the work yet again for US Postal, as did Azevedo and Ruberia. Landis was the last domestique standing and this time he attacked off the front of the final elite group in an attempt to win the stage. Kloden, Basso and Ullrich would not allow it and saw to it he was chased down. Kloden then went for the stage win but Armstrong pounced and hunted him down and bested him at the line to take the stage win, again. In the young rider classification Vladimir Karpets had closed within a minute of Thomas Voeckler. In the overall situation Armstrong had over a +4:00 advantage on Basso, +5:00 on Kloden and +8:00 on Ullrich.

In stage 18 the high mountains were gone and it was the type of stage that could produce a successful breakaway. Six riders went away but when Simeoni went clear Armstrong chased him down. With the Tour now won Armstrong decided to make an example of a rider who was suing him. Simeoni had testified of knowledge he personally had experienced in regards to doping, and Armstrong called him a liar. This was the incident when Armstrong made the "zip your lips" motion to the camera. Simeoni was aware of his situation and his word not counting for much against the fame of Armstrong in a public situation being broadcast on TV. José Vicente García asked Simeoni to back off because if Armstrong remained in the breakaway the peloton would certainly hunt them down. Simeoni fell back, as did Armstrong and the break ended up building a winning gap of over ten minutes. Two riders fought for the win in the sprint where Juan Miguel Mercado edged García at the line. Stage 19 was the final ITT, a typical flat route, although with the dominant lead Armstrong held there wasn't expected to be much excitement. Just the same Armstrong vowed not to back off and to go for the stage win. Viatcheslav Ekimov of Team U.S. Postal Service set the early time to be beat. Ekimov finished the race in 80th, right next to teammate Pavel Padrnos. Padrnos and Stefano Zanini nearly had to leave the Tour because a doping hearing concerning the 2001 Giro d'Italia was taking place in Italy, and they may have had to give testimony. They were allowed to continue the race and finish if they were able to. Americans Bobby Julich and Floyd Landis set the next best times and Landis' would be good enough for 4th, which in conjunction with his performance in the mountains made him a potential contender in future Tours. The podium was made up by Kloden, Ullrich and Armstrong with very similar time gaps as the mountain time trial on Alpe d'Huez. Basso finished 5th and was jumped by Kloden in the standings. Vladimir Karpets was able to take the white jersey from Voeckler during the time trial, the polka dot jersey was secured by Virenque, but the green jersey was not yet won and would be fought over on stage 20 during the finale in Paris.

The final stage was intended to be ceremonial, as the final stage typically is, where Team US Postal would celebrate the record breaking sixth Tour victory of Armstrong. 147 riders survived to the finish and only two teams, Team U.S. Postal Service and Team Rabobank survived with every rider. From the time 'the race is on' was declared Simeoni attacked, having become angry over the incident with Armstrong over the previous two days. US Postal increased the pace at the front of the peloton to bring him back in, but before long Simeoni attacked again. Other teams, perhaps might have empathized with what Simeoni was trying to do, but there were five teams who were taking this stage very seriously and weren't going to allow any breakaway to work. Teams Lotto–Domo, Gerolsteiner, Cofidis, T-Mobile Team and Crédit Agricole were either in contention of winning the green jersey or were intending to win the stage so they were going to make every effort to destroy any escape attempts. Once the race reached the Champs-Élysées a breakaway of ten riders went clear. There were several strong riders in this break, including Pereiro and Jalabert of Team Phonak as well as Merckx Bettini, Voeckler and Scott Sunderland of Alessio–Bianchi among a few others. If this breakaway stayed clear McEwen would win the green jersey. They stayed away for about 25 km, several laps around the circuit, but the peloton worked hard to contain this group, even to the point of Jan Ullrich coming to the front for T-Mobile to help chase them down because his teammate Erik Zabel had to win the stage and hope McEwen had a bad sprint in order for him to win yet another green jersey. On the final lap Fabian Cancellara took a shot, but wasn't able to get a gap and fell back into the bunch as the leadout trains formed for the upcoming sprint. Tom Boonen of Team Quick-Step–Davitamon who finished 6th in the points competition won the stage, announcing his arrival as one of the strongest sprinters in the coming years. He had ridden for US Postal, but changed teams because he felt he could win in his own right and did not want to be a support rider for Armstrong, as US Postal did not pursue stage wins or other jersey competitions. Jean-Patrick Nazon of Team AG2R Prévoyance got 2nd place in the sprint and finished 7th in the points competition while Danilo Hondo took the final podium place. As a result of these results, in conjunction with McEwen finishing 4th, McEwen won the points competition. The best young rider was Vladimir Karpets, Richard Virenque won the king of the mountains and Lance Armstrong won the Tour.

=== Aftermath ===
Lance Armstrong: With this victory Lance Armstrong became the first rider to six Tour wins. This victory would be followed with his 7th Tour victory the following year. The 2005 Tour de France would also tie Armstrong for 2nd on the list of all time podium finishes with Bernard Hinault and Joop Zoetemelk. He would tie Raymond Poulidor for the most podiums all time when he finished 3rd in the 2009 Tour de France. Following the 'Lance Armstrong Doping Case' the record of five tour victories reverted to a tie between Jacques Anquetil, Eddy Merckx, Bernard Hinault, and Miguel Induráin, and the record for podium finishes reverted to Poulidor.

Jan Ullrich: was always the primary favorite thought to be able to challenge the Armstrong machine of US Postal. He was never able to defeat Armstrong and finished 2nd to him on multiple occasions. Armstrong himself said Ullrich was the only rider he feared. He would be caught up in a doping scandal, admit to doping, have results voided because of it and retired prior to the 2007 cycling season considered one of the strongest riders of his generation. He said he never once felt like he cheated other cyclists he was competing against. Like Marco Pantani, Ullrich would develop substance abuse problems. Fortunately they did not take his life and as of 2022 he has been in recovery for several years.

Filippo Simeoni: was not a stranger to controversy prior to the stage 18 incident with Armstrong. The September 11 attacks happened during the first week of the 2001 Vuelta a España. Two weeks later Simeoni won a stage, and prior to the finish line he got off his bike, hoisted it above his head like a trophy and walked across the line. It is against the rules to do this, and there was question as to whether or not this was a tribute to the victims of the terrorist attacks in America. He rode for a few more years, winning the national championship of Italy in 2008. Like Levi Leipheimer he would face ridicule and bullying for being forced to testify by court order.

Levi Leipheimer: rode for well over a decade and had top tier results in several grand tours putting him behind only LeMond and Armstrong among American riders in many respects. In 2010 he was forced, as a law abiding American citizen, to testify to a grand jury regarding what he knew of doping in cycling. He was received harshly in the cycling world, received threats from riders on opposing teams and even the team boss of his own team, Johan Bruyneel, saw to it that Team Radioshack did not re-sign him whether it was for personal reasons, or to protect Leipheimer from the impending backlash. He rode for Team Quickstep at the end of his career and retired with a six-month suspension in the aftermath of the USADA case against Lance Armstrong.

Tyler Hamilton: He went on to win a gold medal in the 2004 Summer Olympics. On September 11, 2004, he became the first American to win a stage in all three grand tours. He did not finish the race, and then got caught in a doping control. He appealed initially, and even though they were fierce rivals, Lance Armstrong came to his defense offering to pay his legal fees. He went on to ride a few more years, but never again attempted to compete at the highest level. In 2005 and 2006 his only wins were riding in his native New England where he would win the Mount Washington mountain climb. In 2012 his book, written along with Daniel Coyle, won the William Hill Sports Book of the Year.

Thomas Voeckler: Following this performance Voeckler had offers coming at him in all directions, including an offer to become the highest paid French rider. Voeckler turned down the offer to remain riding for his current coach, Jean-René Bernaudeau. The next time a French rider would wear the yellow jersey as long as Voeckler did in 2004, wasn't until 2011, and it was once again Voeckler, while still riding for Bernaudeau, wearing the maillot jaune for half the Tour.

=== Doping ===
The 18th stage saw mistreatment of Filippo Simeoni by Lance Armstrong, after Simeoni had testified about doping and doctor Michele Ferrari.

The book L. A. Confidentiel, by David Walsh and Pierre Ballester, came out shortly before the 2004 Tour, accusing Lance Armstrong of doping. Lance Armstrong and his lawyers asked for an emergency hearing in French court to insert a denial into the book. The French judge denied this request. Armstrong also launched defamation suits against the publisher and the authors, as well as magazine L'Express and UK newspaper The Sunday Times which both referenced it.

Subsequent to Armstrong's statement to withdraw his fight against United States Anti-Doping Agency's (USADA) charges, on 24 August 2012, the USADA said it would ban Armstrong for life and stripped him of his record seven Tour de France titles. Later that day it was confirmed in a USADA statement that Armstrong was banned for life and would be disqualified from any and all competitive results obtained on and subsequent to 1 August 1998, including forfeiture of any medals, titles, winnings, finishes, points and prizes. On 22 October 2012, the Union Cycliste Internationale endorsed the USADA sanctions, and decided not to award victories to any other rider or upgrade other placings in any of the affected events.

After Hamilton's doping scare at the 2004 Tour he had several other incidents that were the result of improper medical procedures. At one point he was in Madrid getting blood drawn to be transfused in a future race. Upon leaving the "medical facility" he was out on the streets of Madrid wearing a baseball cap and sunglasses so he wouldn't be identified by any fans, when he noticed that his arm was covered in blood, dripping all the way down his arm. The needle wasn't withdrawn properly or bandaged properly and at that moment Hamilton came to the realization that he was bleeding all over himself on the side of the road from one arm, and in his other hand he was holding a primitive version of a "burner phone", a secret phone he used that had the numbers of all of his doping contacts.

Hamilton was caught in a doping incident during the 2004 Vuelta. His "doctor" had accidentally mixed up the rider's blood and transfused the blood of another rider into Hamilton. This was discovered during a doping control and Hamilton was suspended for doping. Having the blood of another human could have caused him serious health trouble, although luckily for Hamilton it did not. Hamilton paid in excess of $100,000 of his own money for this medical 'treatment'. See Operación Puerto doping case.

== Classification leadership and minor prizes ==
There were four main individual classifications contested in the 2004 Tour de France, as well as a team competition. The most important was the general classification, which was calculated by adding each rider's finishing times on each stage. Time bonuses given at the end of each mass start stage. If a crash had happened within the final 3 km (1.9 mi) of a stage, not including time trials and summit finishes, the riders involved would have received the same time as the group they were in when the crash occurred. The rider with the lowest cumulative time was the winner of the general classification and was considered the overall winner of the Tour. The rider leading the classification wore a yellow jersey.

The second classification was the points classification. Riders received points for finishing in the highest positions in a stage finish, or in intermediate sprints during the stage. The points available for each stage finish were determined by the stage's type. The leader was identified by a green jersey.

The third classification was the mountains classification. Most stages of the race included one or more categorised climbs, in which points were awarded to the riders that reached the summit first. The climbs were categorised as fourth-, third-, second- or first-category and hors catégorie, with the more difficult climbs rated lower. The leader wore a white jersey with red polka dots.

The final individual classification was the young rider classification. This was calculated the same way as the general classification, but the classification was restricted to riders who were born on or after 1 January 1979. The leader wore a white jersey.

The final classification was a team classification. This was calculated using the finishing times of the best three riders per team on each stage; the leading team was the team with the lowest cumulative time. The number of stage victories and placings per team determined the outcome of a tie.

In addition, there was a combativity award given after each mass start stage to the rider considered, by a jury, to have "made the most effort and who has demonstrated the best sportsmanship". The winner wore a blue number bib the following stage. At the conclusion of the Tour, Richard Virenque (Quick-Step–Davitamon) was given the overall super-combativity award. The Souvenir Henri Desgrange was given in honour of Tour founder Henri Desgrange to the first rider to pass the summit of the highest climb in the Tour, the Col de la Madeleine on stage 17. This prize was won by Gilberto Simoni.

Classification leadership by stage
Stage	Winner	General classification	Points classification	Mountains classification	Young rider classification	Team classification	Combativity award
P	Fabian Cancellara	Fabian Cancellara	Fabian Cancellara	no award	Fabian Cancellara	U.S. Postal Service	no award
1	Jaan Kirsipuu	Fabian Cancellara	Thor Hushovd	Jens Voigt	Fabian Cancellara	U.S. Postal Service	Jens Voigt
2	Robbie McEwen	Thor Hushovd	Thor Hushovd	Paolo Bettini	Fabian Cancellara	U.S. Postal Service	Jakob Piil
3	Jean-Patrick Nazon	Robbie McEwen	Robbie McEwen	Paolo Bettini	Fabian Cancellara	U.S. Postal Service	Jens Voigt
4	U.S. Postal Service	~~Lance Armstrong~~	Robbie McEwen	Paolo Bettini	Matthias Kessler	U.S. Postal Service	no award
5	Stuart O'Grady	Thomas Voeckler	Robbie McEwen	Paolo Bettini	Thomas Voeckler	Team CSC	Sandy Casar
6	Tom Boonen	Thomas Voeckler	Stuart O'Grady	Paolo Bettini	Thomas Voeckler	Team CSC	Jimmy Engoulvent
7	Filippo Pozzato	Thomas Voeckler	Stuart O'Grady	Paolo Bettini	Thomas Voeckler	Team CSC	Thierry Marichal
8	Thor Hushovd	Thomas Voeckler	Robbie McEwen	Paolo Bettini	Thomas Voeckler	Team CSC	Jakob Piil
9	Robbie McEwen	Thomas Voeckler	Robbie McEwen	Paolo Bettini	Thomas Voeckler	Team CSC	Iñigo Landaluze
10	Richard Virenque	Thomas Voeckler	Robbie McEwen	Richard Virenque	Thomas Voeckler	Team CSC	Richard Virenque
11	David Moncoutié	Thomas Voeckler	Robbie McEwen	Richard Virenque	Thomas Voeckler	Team CSC	David Moncoutié
12	Ivan Basso	Thomas Voeckler	Robbie McEwen	Richard Virenque	Thomas Voeckler	Team CSC	Frédéric Finot
13	~~Lance Armstrong~~	Thomas Voeckler	Robbie McEwen	Richard Virenque	Thomas Voeckler	Team CSC	Michael Rasmussen
14	Aitor González	Thomas Voeckler	Robbie McEwen	Richard Virenque	Thomas Voeckler	T-Mobile Team	Nicolas Jalabert
15	~~Lance Armstrong~~	~~Lance Armstrong~~	Robbie McEwen	Richard Virenque	Thomas Voeckler	Team CSC	Michael Rasmussen
16	~~Lance Armstrong~~	~~Lance Armstrong~~	Robbie McEwen	Richard Virenque	Thomas Voeckler	T-Mobile Team	no award
17	~~Lance Armstrong~~	~~Lance Armstrong~~	Robbie McEwen	Richard Virenque	Thomas Voeckler	T-Mobile Team	Gilberto Simoni
18	Juan Miguel Mercado	~~Lance Armstrong~~	Robbie McEwen	Richard Virenque	Thomas Voeckler	T-Mobile Team	José García Acosta
19	~~Lance Armstrong~~	~~Lance Armstrong~~	Robbie McEwen	Richard Virenque	Vladimir Karpets	T-Mobile Team	no award
20	Tom Boonen	~~Lance Armstrong~~	Robbie McEwen	Richard Virenque	Vladimir Karpets	T-Mobile Team	Filippo Simeoni
Final		~~Lance Armstrong~~	Robbie McEwen	Richard Virenque	Vladimir Karpets	T-Mobile Team	Richard Virenque

- In stage 1, Lance Armstrong wore the green jersey.
- In stages 1 and 2, Bernhard Eisel wore the white jersey.
- In stage 3, Jaan Kirsipuu wore the green jersey.
- In stage 4, Jean-Patrick Nazon wore the green jersey.
- In stages 6 through 15, Sandy Casar wore the white jersey.

== Final standings ==
Legend
Green jersey	Denotes the leader of the points classification	Polka dot jersey	Denotes the leader of the mountains classification
White jersey	Denotes the leader of the young rider classification	A white jersey with a red number bib.	Denotes the winner of the super-combativity award

=== General classification ===
Final general classification (1–10)
Rank	Rider	Team	Time
DSQ	~~Lance Armstrong (USA)~~	~~U.S. Postal Service~~	~~83h 36' 02"~~
2	Andreas Klöden (GER)	T-Mobile Team	+ 6' 19"
3	Ivan Basso (ITA)	Team CSC	+ 6' 40"
4	Jan Ullrich (GER)	T-Mobile Team	+ 8' 50"
5	José Azevedo (POR)	U.S. Postal Service	+ 14' 30"
6	Francisco Mancebo (ESP)	Illes Balears–Banesto	+ 18' 01"
7	Georg Totschnig (AUT)	Gerolsteiner	+ 18' 27"
8	Carlos Sastre (ESP)	Team CSC	+ 19' 51"
DSQ	~~Levi Leipheimer (USA)~~	~~Rabobank~~	~~+ 20' 12"~~
10	Óscar Pereiro (ESP)	Phonak	+ 22' 54"

Final general classification (11–147)
Rank	Rider	Team	Time
11	Pietro Caucchioli (ITA)	Alessio–Bianchi	+ 24' 21"
12	Christophe Moreau (FRA)	Crédit Agricole	+ 24' 36"
13	Vladimir Karpets (RUS)	Illes Balears–Banesto	+ 25' 11"
14	Michael Rasmussen (DEN)	Rabobank	+ 27' 16"
15	Richard Virenque (FRA)	Quick-Step–Davitamon	+ 28' 11"
16	Sandy Casar (FRA)	FDJeux.com	+ 28' 53"
17	Gilberto Simoni (ITA)	Saeco	+ 29' 00"
18	Thomas Voeckler (FRA)	Brioches La Boulangère	+ 31' 12"
19	José Luis Rubiera (ESP)	U.S. Postal Service	+ 32' 50"
20	Stéphane Goubert (FRA)	AG2R Prévoyance	+ 37' 11"
21	Axel Merckx (BEL)	Lotto–Domo	+ 39' 54"
22	Michael Rogers (AUS)	Quick-Step–Davitamon	+ 41' 39"
23	Floyd Landis (USA)	U.S. Postal Service	+ 42' 55"
24	Óscar Sevilla (ESP)	Phonak	+ 45' 19"
25	Giuseppe Guerini (ITA)	T-Mobile Team	+ 47' 07"
26	Iker Camaño (ESP)	Euskaltel–Euskadi	+ 47' 14"
27	Jérôme Pineau (FRA)	Brioches La Boulangère	+ 47' 43"
28	José Enrique Gutiérrez (ESP)	Phonak	+ 50' 39"
29	Laurent Brochard (FRA)	AG2R Prévoyance	+ 51' 35"
30	Sylvain Chavanel (FRA)	Brioches La Boulangère	+ 54' 43"
31	Santos González (ESP)	Phonak	+ 1h 01' 01"
32	Michele Scarponi (ITA)	Domina Vacanze	+ 1h 03' 01"
DSQ	~~George Hincapie~~ (USA)	~~U.S. Postal Service~~	~~+ 1h 04' 09"~~
34	David Moncoutié (FRA)	Cofidis	+ 1h 04' 37"
35	Jens Voigt (GER)	Team CSC	+ 1h 07' 07"
36	Alexander Bocharov (RUS)	Crédit Agricole	+ 1h 10' 54"
37	Juan Miguel Mercado (ESP)	Quick-Step–Davitamon	+ 1h 11' 31"
38	Evgueni Petrov (RUS)	Saeco	+ 1h 12' 24"
39	Patrice Halgand (FRA)	Crédit Agricole	+ 1h 12' 24"
40	Bobby Julich (USA)	Team CSC	+ 1h 12' 42"
41	Egoi Martínez (ESP)	Euskaltel–Euskadi	+ 1h 15' 10"
42	Marius Sabaliauskas (LIT)	Saeco	+ 1h 15' 15"
43	Rik Verbrugghe (BEL)	Lotto–Domo	+ 1h 16' 42"
44	Igor González (ESP)	Liberty Seguros	+ 1h 16' 45"
45	Aitor González (ESP)	Fassa Bortolo	+ 1h 17' 23"
46	Manuel Beltrán (ESP)	U.S. Postal Service	+ 1h 26' 28"
47	Jean-Cyril Robin (FRA)	FDJeux.com	+ 1h 32' 06"
48	Daniele Nardello (ITA)	T-Mobile Team	+ 1h 35' 26"
49	Santiago Pérez (ESP)	Phonak	+ 1h 35' 54"
50	Aitor Osa (ESP)	Illes Balears–Banesto	+ 1h 38' 38"
51	José Iván Gutiérrez (ESP)	Illes Balears–Banesto	+ 1h 39' 16"
52	Iñigo Landaluze (ESP)	Euskaltel–Euskadi	+ 1h 39' 52"
53	Ronny Scholz (GER)	Gerolsteiner	+ 1h 42' 44"
54	Marcos Antonio Serrano (ESP)	Liberty Seguros	+ 1h 42' 53"
55	Jörg Ludewig (GER)	Saeco	+ 1h 44' 57"
DSQ	~~Christian Vande Velde (USA)~~	~~Liberty Seguros~~	~~+ 1h 48' 11"~~
57	Serguei Ivanov (RUS)	T-Mobile Team	+ 1h 49' 51"
58	Paolo Bettini (ITA)	Quick-Step–Davitamon	+ 1h 50' 10"
59	Erik Zabel (GER)	T-Mobile Team	+ 1h 50' 21"
60	Iker Flores (ESP)	Euskaltel–Euskadi	+ 1h 50' 49"
61	Stuart O'Grady (AUS)	Cofidis	+ 1h 51' 41"
62	Mikel Astarloza (ESP)	AG2R Prévoyance	+ 1h 55' 04"
63	Kim Kirchen (LUX)	Fassa Bortolo	+ 1h 55' 52"
64	Andrea Peron (ITA)	Team CSC	+ 1h 56' 29"
65	Grischa Niermann (GER)	Rabobank	+ 1h 57' 25"
66	Benjamín Noval (ESP)	U.S. Postal Service	+ 1h 57' 41"
67	Laurent Dufaux (SUI)	Quick-Step–Davitamon	+ 1h 58' 22"
68	Marzio Bruseghin (ITA)	Fassa Bortolo	+ 1h 59' 21"
69	Rolf Aldag (GER)	T-Mobile Team	+ 2h 02' 55"
70	Claus Michael Møller (DEN)	Alessio–Bianchi	+ 2h 04' 01"
71	Sylvain Calzati (FRA)	R.A.G.T. Semences–MG Rover	+ 2h 09' 34"
72	Nicolas Portal (FRA)	AG2R Prévoyance	+ 2h 09' 45"
73	Isidro Nozal (ESP)	Liberty Seguros	+ 2h 10' 33"
74	Michael Boogerd (NED)	Rabobank	+ 2h 10' 39"
75	Santiago Botero (COL)	T-Mobile Team	+ 2h 12' 32"
76	Pierrick Fédrigo (FRA)	Crédit Agricole	+ 2h 13' 14"
77	David Etxebarria (ESP)	Euskaltel–Euskadi	+ 2h 14' 42"
78	Sebastian Lang (GER)	Gerolsteiner	+ 2h 15' 31"
79	Pavel Padrnos (CZE)	U.S. Postal Service	+ 2h 16' 19"
80	Viatcheslav Ekimov (RUS)	U.S. Postal Service	+ 2h 16' 44"
81	Bert Grabsch (GER)	Phonak	+ 2h 17' 14"
82	Nicolas Jalabert (FRA)	Phonak	+ 2h 18' 42"
83	Benoit Salmon (FRA)	Crédit Agricole	+ 2h 24' 49"
84	Christophe Mengin (FRA)	FDJeux.com	+ 2h 25' 08"
85	Carlos De La Cruz (FRA)	FDJeux.com	+ 2h 25' 43"
86	José Vicente Garcia (ESP)	Illes Balears–Banesto	+ 2h 26' 14"
87	Dimitiri Fofonov (KAZ)	Cofidis	+ 2h 26' 22"
88	Nicki Sørensen (DEN)	Team CSC	+ 2h 27' 39"
89	Mark Scanlon (IRE)	AG2R Prévoyance	+ 2h 27' 49"
90	Marc Lotz (NED)	Rabobank	+ 2h 29' 48"
91	Unai Etxebarria (VEN)	Euskaltel–Euskadi	+ 2h 30' 37"
92	Christophe Rinero (FRA)	R.A.G.T. Semences–MG Rover	+ 2h 31' 34"
93	Juan Antonio Flecha (ESP)	Fassa Bortolo	+ 2h 33' 38"
94	Dariusz Baranowski (POL)	Liberty Seguros	+ 2h 33' 54"
95	Yuriy Krivtsov (UKR)	AG2R Prévoyance	+ 2h 34' 16"
96	Scott Sunderland (AUS)	Alessio–Bianchi	+ 2h 35' 20"
97	Xabier Zandio (ESP)	Illes Balears–Banesto	+ 2h 35' 48"
98	Allan Davis (AUS)	Liberty Seguros	+ 2h 36' 16"
99	Andrea Noè (ITA)	Alessio–Bianchi	+ 2h 36' 36"
100	Koos Moerenhout (NED)	Lotto–Domo	+ 2h 36' 48"
101	Thierry Marichal (BEL)	Lotto–Domo	+ 2h 37' 58"
102	Walter Bénéteau (FRA)	Brioches La Boulangère	+ 2h 38' 36"
103	Anthony Charteau (FRA)	Brioches La Boulangère	+ 2h 41' 31"
104	Thor Hushovd (NOR)	Crédit Agricole	+ 2h 42' 45"
105	David Loosli (SUI)	Saeco	+ 2h 44' 24"
106	Danilo Hondo (GER)	Gerolsteiner	+ 2h 46' 54"
107	Peter Farazijn (BEL)	Cofidis	+ 2h 46' 56"
108	Martin Elmiger (SUI)	Phonak	+ 2h 47' 22"
109	Fabian Cancellara (SUI)	Fassa Bortolo	+ 2h 48' 42"
110	Matteo Tosatto (ITA)	Fassa Bortolo	+ 2h 49' 06"
111	Bram de Groot (NED)	Rabobank	+ 2h 49' 33"
112	Marc Wauters (BEL)	Rabobank	+ 2h 50' 16"
113	Peter Wrolich (AUT)	Gerolsteiner	+ 2h 51' 06"
114	Franck Rénier (BEL)	Brioches La Boulangère	+ 2h 53' 16"
115	Karsten Kroon (NED)	Rabobank	+ 2h 53' 22"
116	Filippo Pozzato (ITA)	Fassa Bortolo	+ 2h 54' 55"
117	Jan Hruška (CZE)	Liberty Seguros	+ 2h 56' 01"
118	Filippo Simeoni (ITA)	Domina Vacanze	+ 2h 56' 30"
119	Ludovic Martin (FRA)	R.A.G.T. Semences–MG Rover	+ 2h 59' 00"
120	Tom Boonen (BEL)	Quick-Step–Davitamon	+ 2h 59' 07"
121	Massimiliano Mori (ITA)	Domina Vacanze	+ 2h 59' 12"
122	Robbie McEwen (AUS)	Lotto–Domo	+ 2h 59' 18"
123	Kurt Asle Arvesen (NOR)	Team CSC	+ 3h 00' 35"
124	Salvatore Commesso (ITA)	Saeco	+ 3h 01' 21"
125	Uwe Peschel (GER)	Gerolsteiner	+ 3h 01' 36"
126	Stefano Zanini (ITA)	Quick-Step–Davitamon	+ 3h 01' 39"
127	Julian Dean (NZL)	Crédit Agricole	+ 3h 02' 09"
128	Gilles Bouvard (FRA)	R.A.G.T. Semences–MG Rover	+ 3h 03' 28"
129	Frédérick Guesdon (FRA)	FDJeux.com	+ 3h 03' 40"
130	Pierre Bourquenoud (SUI)	R.A.G.T. Semences–MG Rover	+ 3h 04' 47"
131	Bernhard Eisel (AUT)	FDJeux.com	+ 3h 05' 44"
132	Marcus Ljungqvist (SWE)	Alessio–Bianchi	+ 3h 07' 51"
133	Erik Dekker (NED)	Rabobank	+ 3h 07' 54"
134	Christophe Laurent (FRA)	R.A.G.T. Semences–MG Rover	+ 3h 09' 38"
135	Fabio Baldato (ITA)	Alessio–Bianchi	+ 3h 10' 46"
136	Guillaume Auger (FRA)	R.A.G.T. Semences–MG Rover	+ 3h 11' 10"
137	Jean-Patrick Nazon (FRA)	AG2R Prévoyance	+ 3h 13' 10"
138	Jimmy Engoulvent (FRA)	Cofidis	+ 3h 13' 55"
139	Baden Cooke (AUS)	FDJeux.com	+ 3h 15' 45"
140	Wim Vansevenant (BEL)	Lotto–Domo	+ 3h 22' 15"
141	Christophe Edaleine (FRA)	Cofidis	+ 3h 22' 39"
142	Servais Knaven (NED)	Quick-Step–Davitamon	+ 3h 23' 07"
143	Francesco Secchiari (ITA)	Domina Vacanze	+ 3h 25' 37"
144	Matthew Wilson (AUS)	FDJeux.com	+ 3h 36' 31"
145	Frédéric Finot (FRA)	R.A.G.T. Semences–MG Rover	+ 3h 39' 21"
146	Sébastien Joly (FRA)	Crédit Agricole	+ 3h 43' 18"
147	Jimmy Casper (FRA)	Cofidis	+ 3h 55' 49"

=== Points classification ===
Final points classification (1–10)
Rank	Rider	Team	Points
1	Robbie McEwen (AUS)	Lotto–Domo	272
2	Thor Hushovd (NOR)	Crédit Agricole	247
3	Erik Zabel (GER)	T-Mobile Team	245
4	Stuart O'Grady (AUS)	Cofidis	234
5	Danilo Hondo (GER)	Gerolsteiner	227
6	Tom Boonen (BEL)	Quick-Step–Davitamon	163
7	Jean-Patrick Nazon (FRA)	AG2R Prévoyance	146
DSQ	~~Lance Armstrong (USA)~~	~~U.S. Postal Service~~	~~143~~
9	Laurent Brochard (FRA)	AG2R Prévoyance	139
10	Andreas Klöden (GER)	T-Mobile Team	131

=== Mountains classification ===
Final mountains classification (1–10)
Rank	Rider	Team	Points
1	Richard Virenque (FRA)	Quick-Step–Davitamon	226
DSQ	~~Lance Armstrong (USA)~~	~~U.S. Postal Service~~	~~172~~
3	Michael Rasmussen (DEN)	Rabobank	119
4	Ivan Basso (ITA)	Team CSC	119
5	Jan Ullrich (GER)	T-Mobile Team	115
6	Christophe Moreau (FRA)	Crédit Agricole	115
7	Andreas Klöden (GER)	T-Mobile Team	112
8	Francisco Mancebo (ESP)	Illes Balears–Banesto	77
9	Jens Voigt (GER)	Team CSC	71
10	Axel Merckx (BEL)	Lotto–Domo	65

=== Young rider classification ===
Final young rider classification (1–10)
Rank	Rider	Team	Time
1	Vladimir Karpets (RUS)	Illes Balears–Banesto	84h 01' 13'
2	Sandy Casar (FRA)	FDJeux.com	+ 3' 42"
3	Thomas Voeckler (FRA)	Brioches La Boulangère	+ 6' 01"
4	Michael Rogers (AUS)	Quick-Step–Davitamon	+ 16' 28"
5	Iker Camaño (ESP)	Euskaltel–Euskadi	+ 22' 03"
6	Jérôme Pineau (FRA)	Brioches La Boulangère	+ 22' 32"
7	Sylvain Chavanel (FRA)	Brioches La Boulangère	+ 29' 32"
8	Michele Scarponi (ITA)	Domina Vacanze	+ 37' 50"
9	Mikel Astarloza (ESP)	AG2R Prévoyance	+ 1h 29' 53"
10	Benjamín Noval (ESP)	U.S. Postal Service	+ 1h 32' 30"

=== Team classification ===
Final team classification (1–10)
Rank	Team	Time
1	T-Mobile Team	248h 58' 43"
2	U.S. Postal Service	+ 2' 42"
3	Team CSC	+ 10' 33"
4	Illes Balears–Banesto	+ 52' 26"
5	Quick-Step–Davitamon	+ 57' 33"
6	Phonak	+ 57' 42"
7	Rabobank	+ 1h 26' 24"
8	Crédit Agricole	+ 1h 30' 35"
9	Brioches La Boulangère	+ 1h 32' 12"
10	Euskaltel–Euskadi	+ 1h 47' 46"

== See also ==
- List of doping cases in cycling

== Bibliography ==
- Augendre, Jacques (2016). "Guide historique" [Historical guide] (PDF). Tour de France (in French). Paris: Amaury Sport Organisation. Archived (PDF) from the original on 17 August 2016.
- "Race regulations" (PDF). Tour de France. Paris: Amaury Sport Organisation. 2004. Archived from the original (PDF) on 4 August 2004.
