= Kevin Hulsmans =

Belgian cyclist (born 1978)

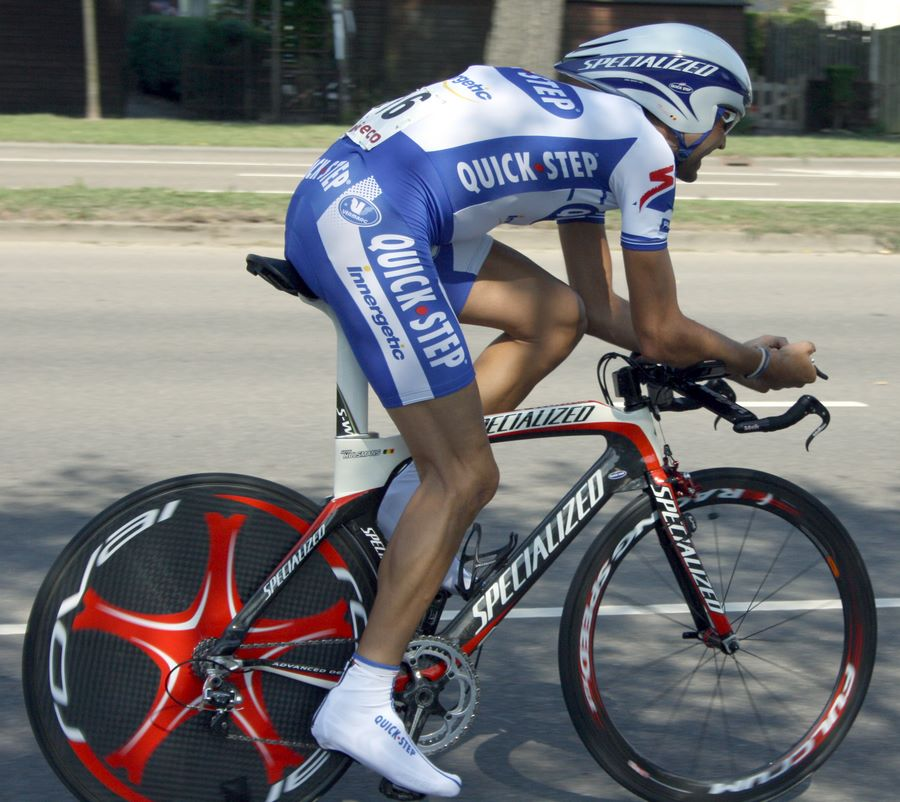

Personal information
- Full name: Kevin Hulsmans
- Born: 11 April 1978 (age 48) Lommel, Belgium
- Height: 1.87 m (6 ft 2 in)
- Weight: 75 kg (165 lb)

Cycling career
- Sport: Cycling
- Current team: Retired
- Discipline: Road
- Role: Rider

Professional teams
- 2000–2002: Mapei–Quick-Step
- 2003–2010: Quick-Step–Davitamon
- 2011: Donckers Koffie–Jelly Belly
- 2012–2013: Farnese Vini–Selle Italia
- 2014–2015: Vastgoedservice–Golden Palace

Kevin Hulsmans (born 11 April 1978) is a Belgian former professional road bicycle racer, who rode professionally between 2000 and 2015.

== Major results ==
2000
1st Stage 9 Niedersachsen-Rundfahrt
2002
1st Stage 1 Circuit Franco-Belge (Omloop van het Houtland)
6th Omloop Het Volk
2007
5th Nationale Sluitingsprijs
7th Overall Three Days of De Panne
2009
5th Overall Driedaagse van West-Vlaanderen
2011
9th Omloop der Kempen

=== Grand Tour general classification results timeline ===
Grand Tour	2004	2005	2006	2007	2008	2009
Giro d'Italia	—	—	—	—	—	98
Tour de France	—	DNF	—	—	—	—
Vuelta a España	104	—	95	116	—	—

Legend
—	Did not compete
DNF	Did not finish

== Post-Retirement ==
Hulsmans played Italian cyclist Filippo Simeoni in the 2015 film The Program.
