= Team time trial =

Bicycle racing event

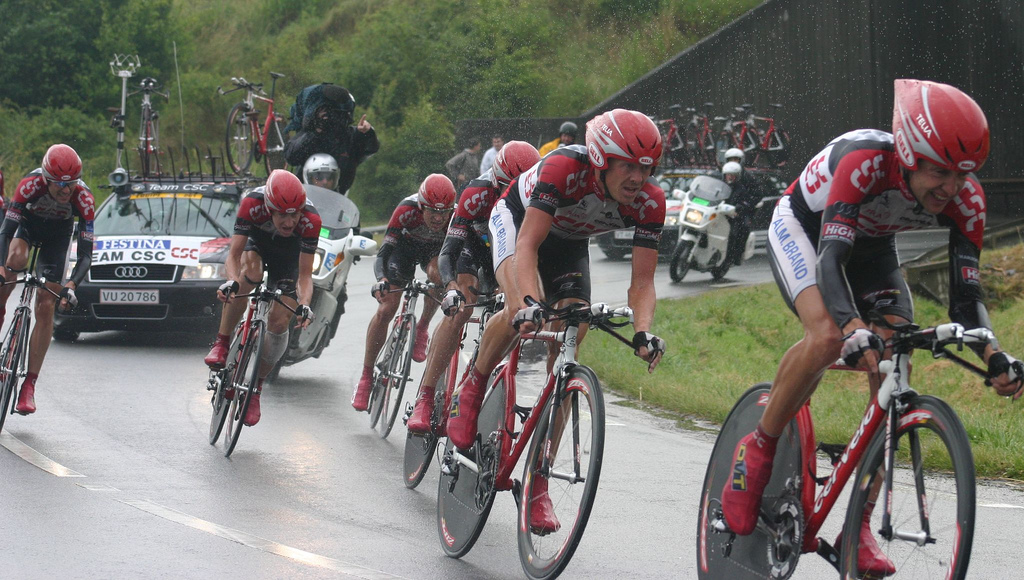
Team CSC at the 2004 Tour de France, Stage 4

A team time trial (TTT) is a road bicycle race in which teams of cyclists race against the clock (see individual time trial for a more detailed description of ITT events).

Teams start at equal intervals, usually two, three or four minutes apart. Starting sequences are usually based on individuals' times in previous events. In TTTs conducted as part of a multi-stage road race (such as the Tour de France and the Giro d'Italia) the highest ranked teams normally start later. Later starters have the advantage of knowing what times they need to beat (and this also makes the event more interesting to spectators).

Unlike individual time trials, where competitors are not permitted to 'draft' (ride in the slipstream) behind each other, in team time trials, riders in each team employ this as their main tactic, each member taking a turn at the front while teammates 'sit in' behind. After their turn, the lead rider will swing over, allowing the next rider to take the lead, while the leader goes to the back of the team.

The winning team in a TTT is based on the time of the Nth rider to cross the finish line, where N is usually the 4th rider in a team of eight or the 5th rider in a team of nine. When a TTT is part of a stage race, the first N riders to cross the finish line are given the time of the Nth rider, and any riders who finish later are timed individually in the usual way.

Starting at the 2023 Paris–Nice stage race, TTTs have sometimes been scored with N=1, meaning that the team's time is based on the time of the first rider to cross the finish line, and each individual's time is based on when they cross the finish line. In such races, teams generally ride as a pack for most of the race, to take advantage of drafting, but the strongest riders may ride individually at the end of the course.

== Tactics and formation ==
Animation of riding a team time trial

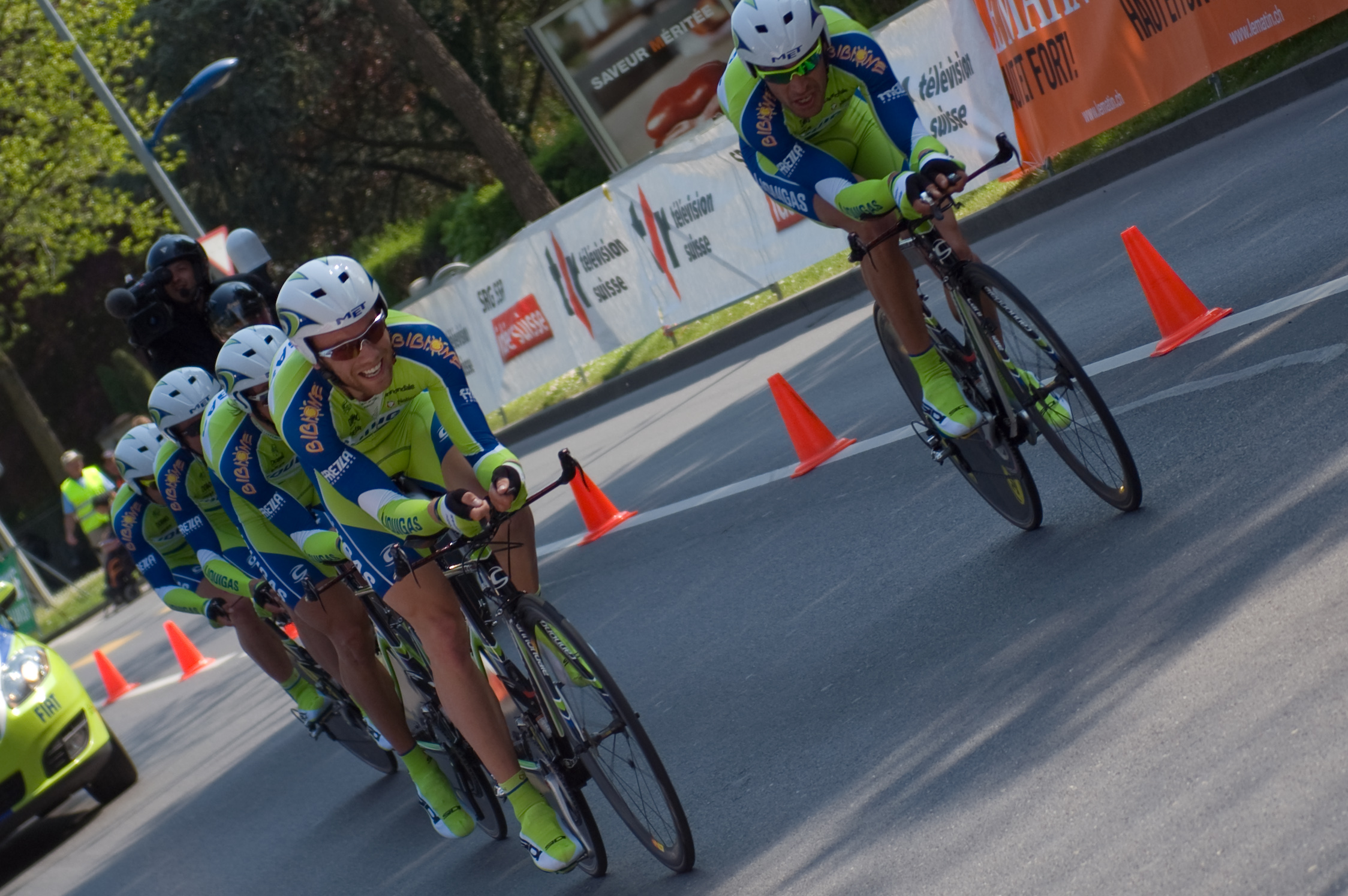
Rotation in a single pace line.

The main principle behind a TTT is that a few riders can ride at the front of the formation slightly above their aerobic threshold while others draft behind these riders. The riders then rotate, allowing some riders to recover while drafting behind fresher teammates. A rider who is riding at the front is said to be taking a pull.

Accelerations require harder efforts, and therefore it is desirable to have a smooth, steady pace. Different riders have different power outputs, lactate thresholds and aerodynamics. In order to equalize the efforts so as not to burn some riders off too early, the weaker riders take shorter pulls and stronger riders take longer pulls, all at the same speed to minimize the change in pace. A rider finishing a pull usually rotates to the very back of the formation, and the rider who was formerly behind this rider takes over. A rider who needs more time to recover may take a longer time at the back of the formation while the other teammates rotate in front of this rider. With increased desired speed, the riders take harder but shorter pulls at the front so as not to burn themselves up.

The choice of formation is crucial to the performance of the team because it dictates how fast the riders can rotate. The two most popular formations are the single paceline and double paceline. In a single paceline, riders take longer pulls. Often, a double paceline is desirable since each rider takes shorter pulls, and therefore a higher pace is able to be maintained. This is why double pacelines are more often seen at the end of a TTT event when the teams are nearing the finish line.

Toward the end of a TTT, a team may choose to have a few of its riders take a death pull, in which the riders take as hard a pull at the front as possible in order to assist the pace at the cost of exhausting themselves with no hope of being able to latch onto the back of the formation for drafting. They then drop back and leave the remainder of the team to finish the time trial.

== Team time trials in stage racing ==
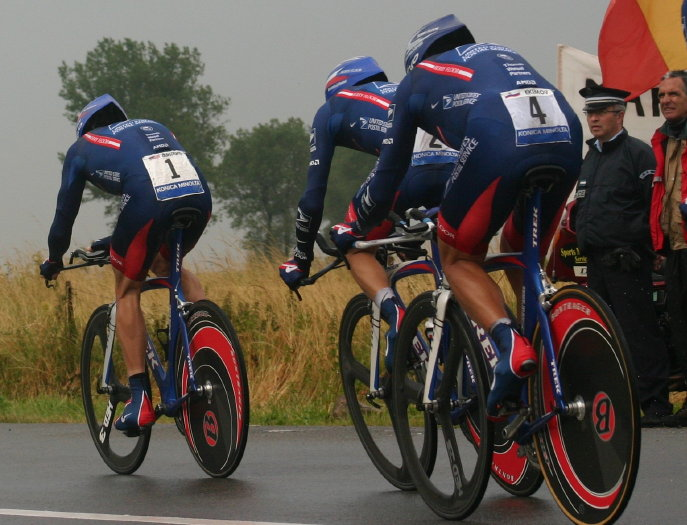
U.S. Postal Team at the 2004 Tour de France. Nicknamed the "blue train"

At the 2004 Tour de France and 2005 Tour de France, the only team that received its actual time was the winning team; the trailing teams at worst received set time penalties based on their placings in that stage – for example, riders in a team that finished six minutes behind the winner might lose only three minutes in the general classification. According to this rule any team that finished within 30 seconds of the winning team would earn its actual time. This happened in 2005, as Team CSC finished two seconds behind Lance Armstrong's Discovery Channel team in that year's team time trial. When the team time trial returned at the 2009 Tour de France, this rule change was not retained.

In the 2023 Paris-Nice stage race, a new team time trial format was debuted in which each rider was given an individual finish time, rather than all riders who finish together getting the same time (in other words, N=1). This format allows tactics by general classifications contenders – whether to ride as a team, or ride solo to achieve a better time. The 2026 Tour de France started with a team time trial in Barcelona, the first for 7 years., using the new 2023 Paris-Nice format.

=== Fastest Grand Tours team time trials ===
The fastest team time trial in the Tour de France was by Orica–GreenEDGE in 2013 during the 25 km team time trial around Nice. Orica–GreenEDGE had an average speed of 57.84 km/h (35.94 mph) and won the stage, with Simon Gerrans taking the yellow jersey.

Team	Average speed	Course	Stage length	Race
Orica–GreenEDGE	57.841 km/h	Nice – Nice	25 km	2013 Tour de France
Discovery Channel Team	57.324 km/h	Tours – Blois	67.5 km	2005 Tour de France
Team CSC	57.298 km/h	Tours – Blois	67.5 km	2005 Tour de France
Team Jumbo–Visma	57.202 km/h	Bruxelles – Bruxelles	27.6 km	2019 Tour de France
Team Jumbo–Visma	56.676 km/h	Utrecht – Utrecht	23.3 km	2022 Vuelta a España
Gewiss–Ballan	54.930 km/h	Mayenne – Alençon	67 km	1995 Tour de France
Carrera Jeans–Vagabond	54.610 km/h	Berlin	40.5 km	1987 Tour de France

== UK team time trial competition ==
From 1970 to 1999, UK amateur cycling club teams, each comprising four riders, competed in an annual national championship run over courses of 100 kilometres (the championship record time of 2:00:07 was achieved in 1993 by a team from North Wirral Velo which included Chris Boardman). The championship was reconstituted in 2004, with teams of three riders competing over 50 km courses (the 2005 event was won by the Recycling.co.uk team in a time of 1:01:20).

Team time trials are also popular during the early parts of the traditional March to September season, though riders are more likely to compete in teams of two or three; distances will tend to be 10 or 25 miles.

In UK, there is a two-up time trial called the Grand Prix des Gentlemen. It was first held in 1970, and is based on the Parisian cycle race 'Gentlemen à Aulnay'. The teams of two must include a veteran rider (over the age of 40), who is classed as the ‘Gentleman’, the other rider being the pacer. The 'Gentleman' isn't allowed to pass the pacer until 200 yards from the finish line. In the past riders such as Chris Boardman, Bradley Wiggins and Michael Hutchinson have raced the event as the pacer, while Tour de France rider Sean Yates has been the pacer, as well as the 'Gentleman'.

== See also ==
- Eindhoven Team Time Trial
- UCI Road World Championships – Men's team time trial
- UCI Road World Championships – Women's team time trial
- Individual time trial
- Time trialist
- Team pursuit
