= Filippo Simeoni =

Italian cyclist

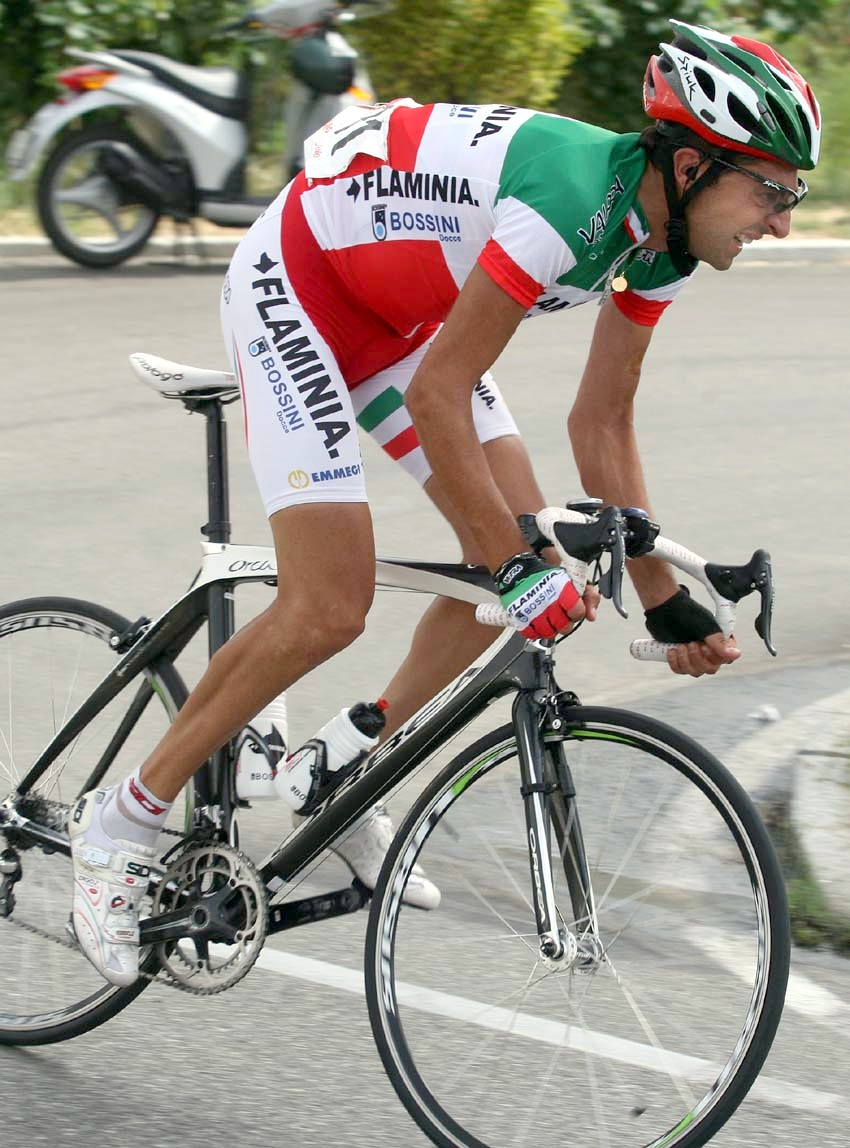

Personal information
- Nickname: Filippo Simeoni
- Born: 17 August 1971 (age 55) Desio, Italy

Cycling career
- Sport: Cycling
- Discipline: Road
- Role: Rider

Professional teams
- 1995–1996: Carrera Jeans–Tassoni
- 1997–1998: Asics–CGA
- 1999: Riso Scotti
- 2000: Amica Chips
- 2001–2002: Cantina Tollo–Acqua & Sapone
- 2003–2004: Domina Vacanze
- 2005–2006: Naturino
- 2007: Aurum Hotels
- 2008–2009: Ceramica Flaminia-Bossini Docce

Major wins
- Grand Tours Vuelta a España 2 individual stages (2001, 2003) One-day races and Classics National Road Race Championships (2008)

Filippo Simeoni (born 17 August 1971) is an Italian former racing cyclist and the 2008 Italian road race champion. Simeoni won two stages in the Vuelta a España in 2001 and 2003, and the 2008 Italian National Road Race Championship.

== Biography ==
He was born in Desio in the province of Milan.

Simeoni is known for his maverick actions. During the stage win in the Vuelta he stopped just before the finish line and walked across the finish line with his bike in his hands. He did so as a tribute to the victims of the 11 September 2001 attacks. Later the Union Cycliste Internationale fined him for this.

In May 2009 he returned his Italian Championship jersey as a protest after his team was not invited to the 2009 Giro d'Italia.

Following his retirement, Simeoni started organizing local races and set up a youth team. In early 2017, he was set to take up a position within the Italian Cycling Federation but was forced to withdraw due to a rule preventing anyone with a doping offense from taking office. The federation was unable to take into account that Simeoni's sentence came in the light of a confession during the court cases against Michele Ferrari.

== Feud with Lance Armstrong ==
Simeoni is better known for his years-long clash with Lance Armstrong. Simeoni was treated by doctor Michele Ferrari, who was also Armstrong's doctor. Simeoni testified in court that he began doping in 1993, that Dr. Ferrari had prescribed him doping products such as EPO and Human Growth Hormone in 1996 and 1997, and that Ferrari also gave him instructions on how to use these products and that he used them. In 2001 and 2002 Simeoni was suspended for several months for doping use. Armstrong reportedly called Simeoni a "liar" in an interview with the French newspaper Le Monde in July 2003. Simeoni lodged a charge of defamation against Armstrong and demanded €100,000. Simeoni announced that he would give any money awarded to him to charity. In 2006 Simeoni dropped the lawsuit.

On the 18th stage of the 2004 edition of the Tour de France, Simeoni gapped up to a breakaway of six riders that posed no threat to Armstrong's leading position. By then, Armstrong was leading the race by seven minutes, and was well on his way to his sixth consecutive Tour victory. Nevertheless, Armstrong broke from the peloton and chased Simeoni down, prompting Armstrong's rival T-Mobile Team to try to catch the breakaway. This would not only catch Simeoni, but end any realistic chance of the six riders in the original breakaway had of winning the stage. The six riders implored Armstrong to drop back to the peloton, but Armstrong would not drop back unless Simeoni went with him. Armstrong's longtime top domestique, George Hincapie, later recalled being surprised at Armstrong's move, given his all-but-insurmountable lead.

In full view of the television cameras, Armstrong put his hand on Simeoni's back and spoke to him. Simeoni subsequently told the United States Anti-Doping Agency that Armstrong told him in Italian:

You made a mistake when you testified against Ferrari, and you made a mistake when you sued me. I have a lot of time and a lot of money, and I can destroy you.

Armstrong then spoke to some of the other riders in the breakaway. It later emerged that Armstrong told them that he would not allow the breakaway to survive as long as Simeoni was part of it. At that point, the other riders badgered Simeoni until he dropped back to the peloton with Armstrong. When Simeoni dropped back, he was abused by many other riders, including Andrea Peron, Filippo Pozzato and Giuseppe Guerini. In a later interview, he told of how Daniele Nardello also abused him, calling him "a disgrace". Afterwards, Armstrong made a "zip-the-lips" gesture but later said that Simeoni "did not deserve" to win a stage. Armstrong said he was acting under the traditional authority granted to the "Patron" of the peloton by the unwritten rules of cycling. He claimed that he was "protecting the interests of the peloton," and that Simeoni was out to "destroy the sport that pays him."

The race ended two days later. Normally, by this time the race's winner has long since secured his victory, and as such, the final ride to Paris is a slow stage in which the celebration starts early. However, Simeoni was still smarting from Armstrong’s intimidation three days before, and attacked several times. Each time, Armstrong's team chased him down. Simeoni was again insulted and spat at by other riders after the race.

Since Simeoni was a prosecution witness in legal proceedings against Ferrari at the time of Armstrong's move against him in the 2004 Tour, Italian authorities threatened to bring charges of witness intimidation against Armstrong. In March 2005 Armstrong was interviewed by the authorities, apparently without resolution. Armstrong had been indicted by Italian authorities in December 2005. A criminal court refused to hear the case in January 2006. On 6 March 2006 Armstong's attorney asked a court to drop charges in Simeoni's defamation lawsuit. On 13 April 2006 Simeoni dropped the defamation suit and Armstrong dismissed his countersuit.

Like Christophe Bassons six years earlier, Simeoni's career suffered after his confrontation with Armstrong. He found it hard to catch on with a team. The final straw came in 2009, when his team was left out of the 2009 Giro d'Italia even though he won the 2008 Italian National champion Road race. In protest, Simeoni returned his 2008 Italian Championship jersey in May 2009. He was suspended for four months by the Italian Cycling Federation for doing so. He retired at the end of the 2009 season.

In October 2012, USADA stripped Armstrong of all seven of his Tour titles and banned from all sports that follow the World Anti-Doping Code for life, effectively ending his competitive career. Simeoni was one of the key witnesses in USADA's case against Armstrong and related how Armstrong threatened him during the 2004 Tour. In its "reasoned decision" announcing Armstrong's ban, USADA harshly criticized Armstrong's behavior during the incident, which it called a "sad moment in cycling." It found that Armstrong's decision to chase Simeoni down was "dangerous and impetuous," since it put him at serious risk of an accident. Moreover, it found that Armstrong had engaged in "attempted witness intimidation," which was in and of itself a violation of the World Anti-Doping Code.

Armstrong confessed to doping in January 2013. When asked about the confession, Simeoni said: "I acknowledge Armstrong's confession on television but he put me through such a humiliating experience and damaged me so much, in terms of sport, morale, and finances that I don't know if I could ever forgive him."

Simeoni was played by Belgian former professional cyclist Kevin Hulsmans in the 2015 film The Program.

== Major results ==
1994
5th Overall Baby Giro
1996
7th Subida a Urkiola
1997
5th Overall Giro del Trentino
1998
3rd Giro del Veneto
6th Trofeo dello Scalatore
2000
1st Overall Regio-Tour

1st Stage 2

1st Stage 1 Tour de Luxembourg
3rd Coppa Agostoni
4th Coppa Placci
10th Giro del Lazio
2001
1st Stage 18 Vuelta a España
2003
1st Stage 19 Vuelta a España
2nd Firenze–Pistoia
2004
1st Stage 5 Tour of Austria
3rd Coppa Placci
4th Tre Valli Varesine
7th GP Industria & Commercio di Prato
8th Trofeo Melinda
2005
4th Overall Tour of Qinghai Lake

1st Stage 2

8th Trofeo Matteotti
2008
1st Road race, National Road Championships
5th Trofeo Matteotti
8th Overall Brixia Tour
10th Overall Euskal Bizikleta

== See also ==
- List of doping cases in cycling
- List of sportspeople sanctioned for doping offences
