= Danilo Hondo =

German cyclist

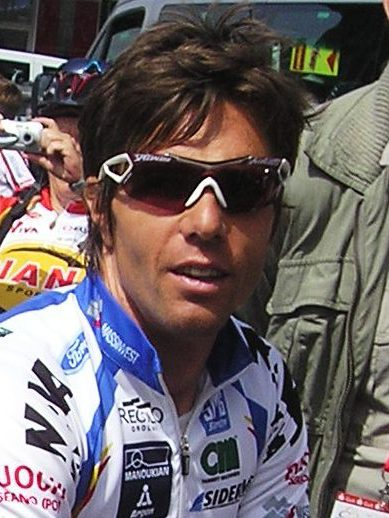
- Hondo at the 2008 German National Road Race Championship

Personal information
- Born: 4 January 1974 (age 52) Guben, East Germany
- Height: 1.86 m (6 ft 1 in)
- Weight: 75 kg (165 lb)

Cycling career
- Sport: Cycling
- Current team: Retired
- Discipline: Road
- Role: Rider
- Rider type: Sprinter

Professional teams
- 1997–1998: Agro–Adler Brandenburg
- 1999–2003: Team Telekom
- 2004–2005: Gerolsteiner
- 2006: Team Lamonta
- 2007: Tinkoff Credit Systems
- 2008: Diquigiovanni–Androni
- 2009: PSK Whirlpool–Author
- 2010–2012: Lampre–Farnese Vini
- 2013–2014: RadioShack–Leopard

Major wins
- Grand Tours Giro d'Italia 2 individual stages (2001) One-Day Races and Classics National Road Race Championship (2002)
Medal record
Men's track cycling
Representing Germany
World Championships
Gold medal – first place	1994 Palermo	Team Pursuit
Bronze medal – third place	1996 Manchester	Team Pursuit

Danilo Hondo (born 4 January 1974) is a German former professional road bicycle racer. He won the German National Road Race in 2002. He competed in the men's team pursuit at the 1996 Summer Olympics.

He was banned from professional cycling and then later won his appeal to return to the sport. From January 2015 to May 2019, Hondo worked as a coach for the Swiss cycling federation, first for the under-23 squad and then with the elite. He owns a bike shop on the island of Mallorca.

== Life ==
Hondo was born in Guben, Brandenburg.

== Doping ==
In 2005 Hondo was suspended and fired after testing positive for carphedon at the 2005 Vuelta a Murcia. Originally suspended for two years, Hondo's suspension was cut to 1 year in June 2005. In January 2006, Hondo had his ban extended to 2 years when he lost his appeal to the Court of Arbitration for Sport. In March 2006, has won his appeal in civil court, which gave Hondo an early end to his suspension. In 2009, he signed for a 3-year contract for Lampre–Farnese Vini.

Following revelations about blood doping by Erfurt-based doctor Mark Schmidt, Hondo confessed to having been a client of his in an interview with German broadcaster ARD on 12 May 2019. He said that he had paid €30,000 to Schmidt for blood transfusions in 2011. Hondo was subsequently fired by the Swiss federation.

== Major results ==
1994
1st Team pursuit, UCI Track World Championships
1996
3rd Team pursuit, UCI Track World Championships
1998
1st Stage 4 Vuelta Ciclista de Chile
1999
Course de la Paix

1st Stages 1, 4 & 5

1st Stage 1 Regio-Tour
2000
Course de la Paix

1st Stages 3 & 5

1st Stage 1b Tour of Sweden
2001
Giro d'Italia

1st Stages 2 & 3
Held after Stages 3–11

1st Tour de Berne
1st Stage 1 Three Days of De Panne
1st Stage 1 Danmark Rundt
1st Stage 4 Ronde van Nederland
1st Points classification Paris–Nice
2002
1st Road race, National Road Championships
1st Stage 2 Volta a Catalunya
1st Stage 2 Rheinland-Pfalz Rundfahrt
1st Stage 3 Hessen-Rundfahrt
2003
Course de la Paix

1st Stages 1 & 2

2nd Rund um Köln
2004
1st Gran Premio Bruno Beghelli
1st Stage 1 Tour du Poitou-Charentes
1st Stage 5 Volta a Catalunya
2nd Overall Three Days of De Panne

1st Stage 1

2nd Rund um Köln
2nd Rund um den Henninger Turm
2nd Paris–Tours
3rd Trofeo Manacor
5th Overall Four Days of Dunkirk

1st Stage 5 (ITT)

6th Overall Niedersachsen-Rundfahrt

1st Stages 1, 2, 4 & 5

2005
2nd Milan–San Remo
8th Overall Vuelta a Murcia

1st Stages 1 & 2

2006
1st Omloop van de Vlaamse Scheldeboorden
1st Neuseen Classics
Course de la Paix

1st Stages 2 & 3

Circuito Montañés

1st Stages 2 & 3

1st Stage 2 Sachsen-Tour
2nd Overall Oddset–Rundfahrt
2nd Overall Circuit Franco-Belge
3rd Overall Regio-Tour

1st Stage 1

3rd Rund um den Henninger Turm
3rd Tour de Rijke
3rd Kampioenschap van Vlaanderen
3rd Omloop van het Houtland
2008
1st Stage 4 Tour de Langkawi
2009
1st Praha–Karlovy Vary–Praha
1st Stage 7 Volta a Portugal
2nd Coppa Bernocchi
7th Overall Course de la Solidarité Olympique

1st Stage 5

2010
9th Tour of Flanders
1st Stage 4 Giro di Sardegna
2nd Coppa Bernocchi
2011
10th Rund um den Finanzplatz Eschborn-Frankfurt

=== Grand Tour general classification results timeline ===
Grand Tour	1999	2000	2001	2002	2003	2004	2005	2006	2007	2008	2009	2010	2011	2012	2013	2014
Giro d'Italia	—	—	91	DNF	—	—	—	—	—	104	—	DNF	DNF	—	96	114
Tour de France	—	—	—	104	—	106	—	—	—	—	—	135	109	86	—	—
Vuelta a España	90	DNF	93	—	—	—	—	—	—	—	—	108	—	—	—	—

Legend
—	Did not compete
DNF	Did not finish

== See also ==
- List of doping cases in cycling
- List of sportspeople sanctioned for doping offences
