= Sergio Marinangeli =

Italian cyclist

Personal information
- Full name: Sergio Marinangeli
- Born: 2 July 1980 (age 46) Gualdo Tadino, Italy

Cycling career
- Sport: Cycling
- Discipline: Road
- Role: Rider

Professional teams
- 2003–2004: Domina Vacanze–Elitron
- 2005–2006: Naturino–Sapore di Mare
- 2007: Aurum Hotels
- 2008–2009: LPR Brakes–Ballan

Major wins
- Gran Premio Bruno Beghelli (2006)

Sergio Marinangeli (born 2 July 1980 in Gualdo Tadino) is an Italian road bicycle racer. He turned professional in 2003.
