= List of films about bicycles and cycling =

This is a list of films about bicycles and cycling, featuring notable films where bicycles and cycling play a central role in the development of the plot.

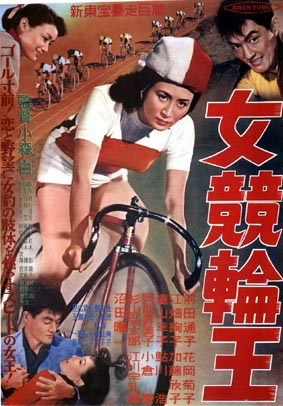
Japanese movie poster for 1956 film Onna Keirin-ō (女競輪王)

== List ==
Title	Year	Genre	Type	Notes
6 Day Bike Rider	1934	Comedy	Velodrome	To impress a girl, a clumsy bumpkin (Joe E. Brown) enters a marathon indoor race.
Bicycle Thieves	1948	Drama	Bicycle theft	A father and son search Rome for a stolen bicycle
Cinq Tulipes rouges (Five Red Tulips)	1949	Murder mystery	Tour De France	During the Tour de France, five champions, all wearing the yellow jersey, are assassinated. Each time, the murderer leaves a red tulip close to the victim as a signature. (French, no subtitles)
Skid Kids	1953	Drama	Cycle speedway	A Children's Film Foundation film. 'Swanky' and his chums take on bike thieves.
Onna Keirin-ō	1956		Keirin	
Vive le Tour	1962	Short	Tour De France	
For A Yellow Jersey	1965	Short		
The Stars and the Water Carriers	1974	Documentary	Road racing	Chronicles the 1974 Giro d’Italia
A Sunday in Hell	1977	Documentary	Road racing	Chronicles the 1976 Paris–Roubaix race.
Breaking Away	1979	Comedy-drama	Road racing and Little 500	Four Bloomington, Indiana friends team up in Little 500 race. Golden Globe winner and five Oscar nominations.
E.T. the Extra-Terrestrial	1982	Adventure		American science fiction film, in which the bicycle plays a key role in outrunning the forces of law and order, culminating in the "flying bicycle" chase scene enabled by the eponymous character
BMX Bandits	1983	Adventure	BMX racing	Australian children's film, featuring Nicole Kidman.
American Flyers	1985	Drama	Road racing	Kevin Costner as a world-class long-distance racer.
Pee-wee's Big Adventure	1985	Comedy	Bicycle Theft	Paul Reubens as a man-child on a quest to find his stolen customized bicycle.
Rad	1986		BMX racing	A boy risks college future to enter Helltrack race.
Quicksilver	1986	Drama		Kevin Bacon as a stock broker who becomes a bike messenger
The Cyclist	1987	Drama		Iranian film.
Jo Jeeta Wohi Sikandar	1992	Drama		Indian film about sporting rivalry between three schools.
Il grande Fausto	1995			Road racing
Tempo	1996		Bike courier	A story about a young bike courier in Vienna who gets mixed up between his daydreams and a real adventure.
The Unknown Cyclist	1998	Drama		
2 Seconds	1998	Drama	Downhill racing	Laurie takes a job as a bike courier in Montreal after being fired from her previous job as a professional downhill racer.
El Amateur	1999		Road racing	Argentina film.
Beijing Bicycle	2001	Drama	Bicycle Theft	A country boy trying to make a living as a courier in Beijing tries to get his company bike back after it is stolen and sold to a city boy.
Road to Paris	2001	Documentary	Road racing	A look at the training and success of Lance Armstrong.
Cyclomania	2001		Road racing	Finland film.
Le Vélo de Ghislain Lambert	2001	Comedy	Road racing	The story of Lambert, a modest Belgian bike racer in the '70s.
Nasu: Summer in Andalusia	2003	Anime	Road racing	Japan film.
Triplets of Belleville	2003	Animated		A grandmother seeks a kidnapped Tour de France cyclist.
Cycling Chronicles; LandScape The Boy Saw	2004			
Hell on Wheels	2005	Documentary	Road Racing	Germany film about 2003 Tour de France.
Overcoming	2005	Documentary	Road racing	
Joe Kid on a Stingray	2005	Documentary	BMX Racing	American film about 70's BMX.
The Flying Scotsman	2006	Drama	Track Cycling	Based on life and career of Scottish cyclist Graeme Obree.
Island Etude	2006	Drama		Taiwan film.
Klunkerz: A Film About Mountain Bikes	2006	Documentary		
Clorophilla	2006		Freeride	Italy film.
The Cycling Genius Is Coming	2008			
Bicycle Dreams	2009	Documentary	Road racing	A look at 3,000-mile Race Across America.
The Birth of Big Air	2010	Documentary	BMX	Made for TV as part of ESPN's 30 for 30 series. Chronicles the life and career of Mat Hoffman.
Ride the Divide	2010	Documentary	Endurance racing	Race along the Great Divide from Banff, Canada, to the U.S.-Mexico border.
The Last Kilometer	2012	Documentary	Road racing	A portrait of road cycling. With Ignazio & Francesco Moser, Davide Rebellin, Gianni Mura, Didi Senft.
Premium Rush	2012	Action Film	Messenger biking	Follows a bicycle messenger chased around New York City by a corrupt police officer who wants an envelope the messenger has.
Pantani: The Accidental Death of a Cyclist	2013	Documentary	Road racing	
The Armstrong Lie	2013	Documentary	Road racing	A portrait of Lance Armstrong as he trains for his eighth Tour de France victory and the events leading to his downfall.
La grande boucle	2013	Comedy	Road racing	A French amateur cyclist decides to take part in the Tour de France.
Bicycle	2014	Documentary	History	The rise and fall of the bicycle and bicycle culture in Great Britain from its origins to modern day.
Slaying the Badger	2014	Documentary	Road racing	Made for TV as a part of ESPN's 30 for 30 series. Examines rivalry between Greg LeMond and Bernard Hinault ("The Badger") as teammates during 1986 Tour de France.
Yowamushi Pedal Re:RIDE	2014	Animated	Road racing	
To the Fore	2015	Drama	Road racing	Hong Kong-Chinese film.
Yowamushi Pedal Re: ROAD	2015	Animated	Road racing	
Yowamushi Pedal: The Movie	2015	Animated	Road racing	
The Program	2015	Drama	Road racing	An adaptation of David Walsh's book Seven Deadly Sins depicting his battle to expose Lance Armstrong.
Le Ride	2016	Documentary	Road racing	A look back at the 1928 Tour de France, and particularly the four-member Australasian team that rode in it, interspersed with a modern-day attempt by the film's director Phil Keoghan and a riding partner to retrace the 1928 route, holding to the original race schedule and riding on 1928-vintage racing bikes.
Blood Road	2017	Documentary	Mountain biking	Covers the 2015 ride of mountain bike endurance champion Rebecca Rusch to visit the site where her father died when his plane was shot down during the Vietnam War—a 1,200-mile journey along the Ho Chi Minh Trail through Vietnam, Cambodia, and Laos.
Tour de Pharmacy	2017	Comedy	Road racing	HBO mockumentary short film starring Andy Samberg, about a 1980s Tour de France competition beset by doping and bad behavior.
Time Trial	2017	Documentary	Road cycling	British documentary film about the final season of David Millar's professional cycling career.
Icarus	2017	Documentary	Road Racing	Brian Fogel, a competitive amateur bicyclist and documentary filmmaker, attempts to make a film about the prevalence of performance-enhancing drug abuse in bicycle racing, a project that connects him with the head of the Moscow Anti-Doping Laboratory just as the scandal around Russian doping at the 2014 Winter Olympic Games begins to unfold.
The Ride	2018	Drama	BMX	Based on a book with the same title, the inspiring true story of extreme sports legend John Buultjens, The Ride follows John McCord, an athletically gifted youth who triumphs over a troubled upbringing. Starring Ludacris.
The Climb	2019	Comedy	Road cycling	
LANCE	2020	Documentary	Road racing	Made for TV as a part of ESPN's 30 for 30 series. Two-part examination of the life, career, and controversies of Lance Armstrong.
The Racer	2020	Sports film	Road racing	At the start of what will probably be his last Tour de France, Dom is unceremoniously expelled from the team he dedicated his whole life to. As he prepares to return home, a massive doping scandal knocks another teammate out of the Tour and Dom has to get back in the saddle.
Cape to Cape	2021	Documentary		A documentary about the fastest unsupported continental bicycle crossing.
The Limit is Just Me	2022	Documentary	Endurance	The film follows adventurer and multiple world record holder Jonas Deichmann as he completes the longest triathlon of all time.
The Last Rider	2022	Documentary	Road racing	Documentary about the career of Greg LeMond, and the 1989 Tour de France
Kurangu Pedal	2022	Drama - Tamil	Love of cycling	A heartfelt drama that explores a child's quest to learn cycling against the backdrop of a father's unfamiliarity with it, highlighting a generation's emotional bond with bicycles and evoking nostalgia through the innocence and camaraderie of childhood.
Hard Miles	2023	Drama	Touring	A beleaguered coach named Greg rallies a group of disgruntled teenage inmates of a correctional facility for a transformative 1,000-mile (1,600 km) bicycle ride from Denver to the Grand Canyon, where they must battle obstacles and each other.
Tour de France: Unchained	2023-2025	Documentary	Tour de France	Behind-the-scenes Netflix documentary following some of the sport’s leading teams.
Anywhere Anytime	2024	Drama	Bicycle theft	An African immigrant searches Torino for his stolen bicycle.
Crossing America	2024	Documentary		A documentary about the Jonas Deichmann's duathlon across USA.

== List of highest grossing bicycle and cycling films ==
The following is a list of bicycle and cycling films that surpassed $1 million.

List of highest grossing bicycle and cycling films
Rank	Film	Worldwide gross	Year	Ref
1	Pee-wee's Big Adventure	$41,047,344	1985	
2	Premium Rush	$31,083,599	2012	
3	Breaking Away	$20,000,000	1979	
4	The Triplets of Belleville	$14,776,775	2003	
5	Quicksilver	$7,246,979	1986	
6	The Program	$3,335,613	2015	
7	Rad	$2,015,882	1986	
8	American Flyers	$1,420,355	1985	
9	The Flying Scotsman	$1,260,553	2006	
10	The Climb	$1,027,043	2020	

== See also ==
- List of highest-grossing sports films
- List of sports films
