= Nat X Ross =

American mountain biker (born 1971)

Nat Ross
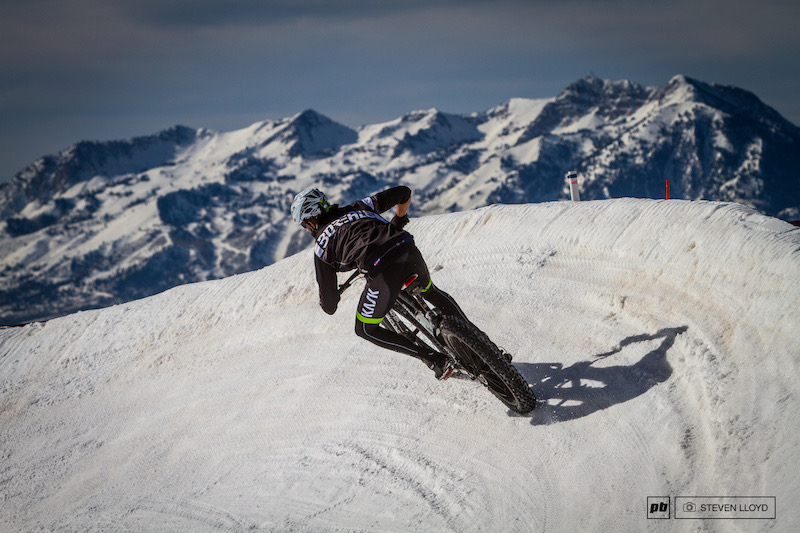

Personal information
- Nickname: Nat Ross
- Born: October 8, 1971 (age 54) Colorado Springs, Colorado
- Home town: Bentonville, Arkansas
- Education: Western Colorado University
- Height: 5 ft 10 in (178 cm)
- Spouse: Aimee Ross

Sport
- Sport: Mountain Bicycling, Road Cycling, Triathlon. Categories: Enduro, Cross-Country Racing, STXC, Marathon, Ultra-Distance, and 24-Hour Racing Solo, Mountain Biking
- Events: X Games, Leadville Trail 100, Cyclocross, 12 Hours of Snowmass, Race Across America, 24 Hours of Old Pueblo, 100-Mile NORBA National Championships, Kamikaze Downhill, Dirty Kanza, UCI Mountain Bike World Championships, and E-MTB

Nat Ross (born October 8, 1971) is an American professional cross-country mountain bike racer. Ross became the first American to win a professional race on a twenty-nine inch mountain bike. Ross was inducted into the Mountain Bike Hall of Fame in 2008. Ross is a two-time World Champion with multiple National Championship titles. Ross is a pioneer in mountain bike innovation with regards to racing.

== Early life ==
Born in Colorado Springs, Ross grew up in Colorado. A lifelong fan of outdoor pursuits, he first became interested in cycling as a student while attending high school and later in college at Western Colorado University in Gunnison, Colorado, where he was pursuing his education. He completed his degree studies and graduated in 1994 and holds a BS in biochemistry.

== Career ==
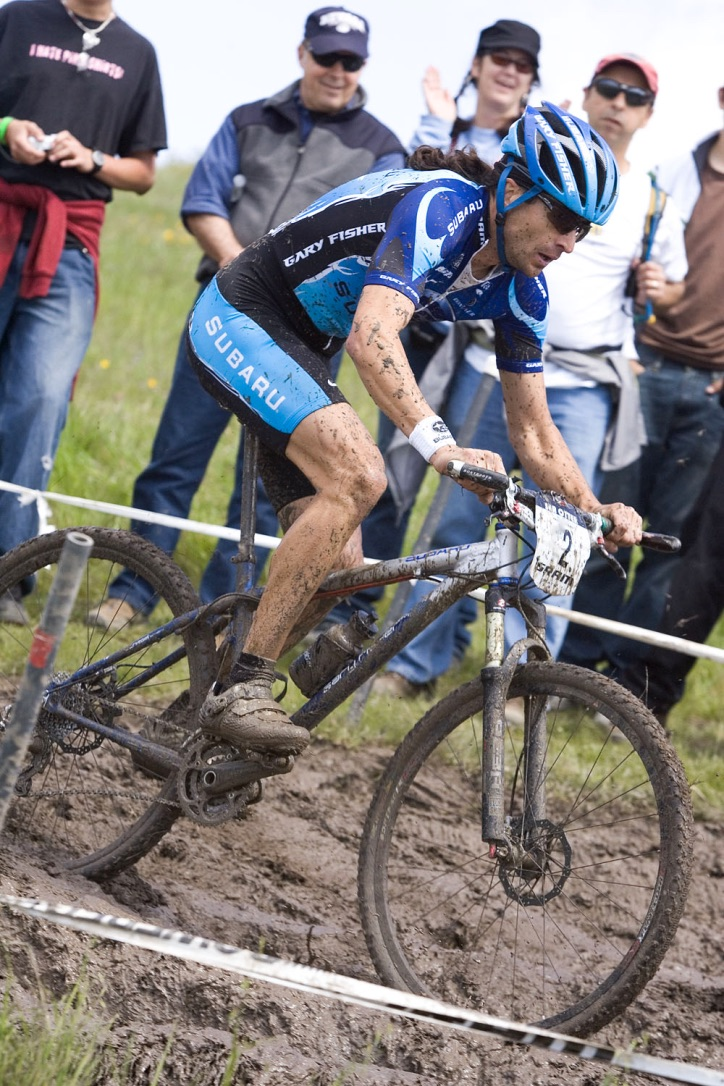
Ross during the Sea Otter Classic 2006 event

While he was also a talented skier, the rising popularity of the sport at the time piqued his interest in mountain biking. Almost immediately after taking up the sport, Ross met with success with in Ultra-Distance and 24 Hour Solo events. Ross was the longest standing member of the Subaru/Gary Fisher UCI Professional Cycling Team (now known as Team Subaru-Trek) for over a decade and was among the premier cross country mountain bikers in the world. Gary Fisher considered one of the innovators of the modern mountain bike.

Ross competed in the first X-Games Winter competition in 1994 in Winter Bike X and continued to compete and win multiple National Championship titles in the Marathon, 100- Miler, and 24 Hour disciplines as well as a two Global 24 Hour Championship titles.

Additional competitions include top 20 finishes in multiple XTerra Off-Road Triathlons professional level, the ITU (International Triathlon Union) Winter races where he competed in Elite Men in 2007, and the UCI World Championships in Italy where he represented the United States in 2007. As a member of Team Vail in 2006 and 2007, he and his team won the Race Across America.

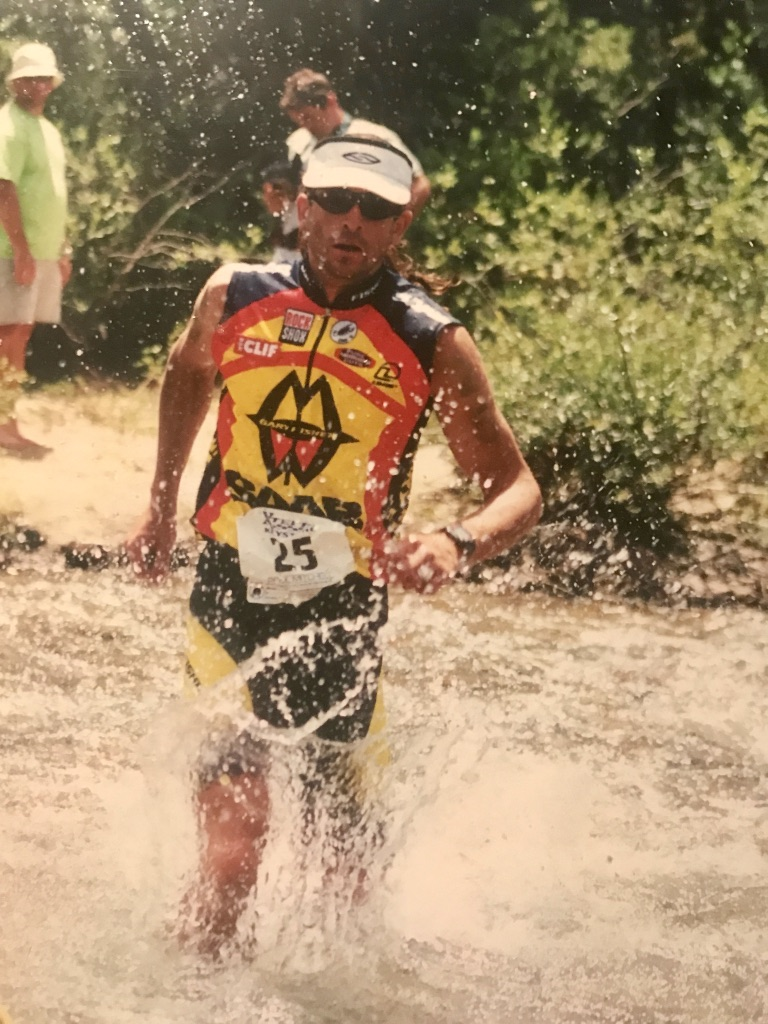
Nat Ross XTerra Saab-Gary Fisher

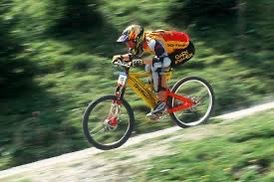
Ft William World Cup-Scotland

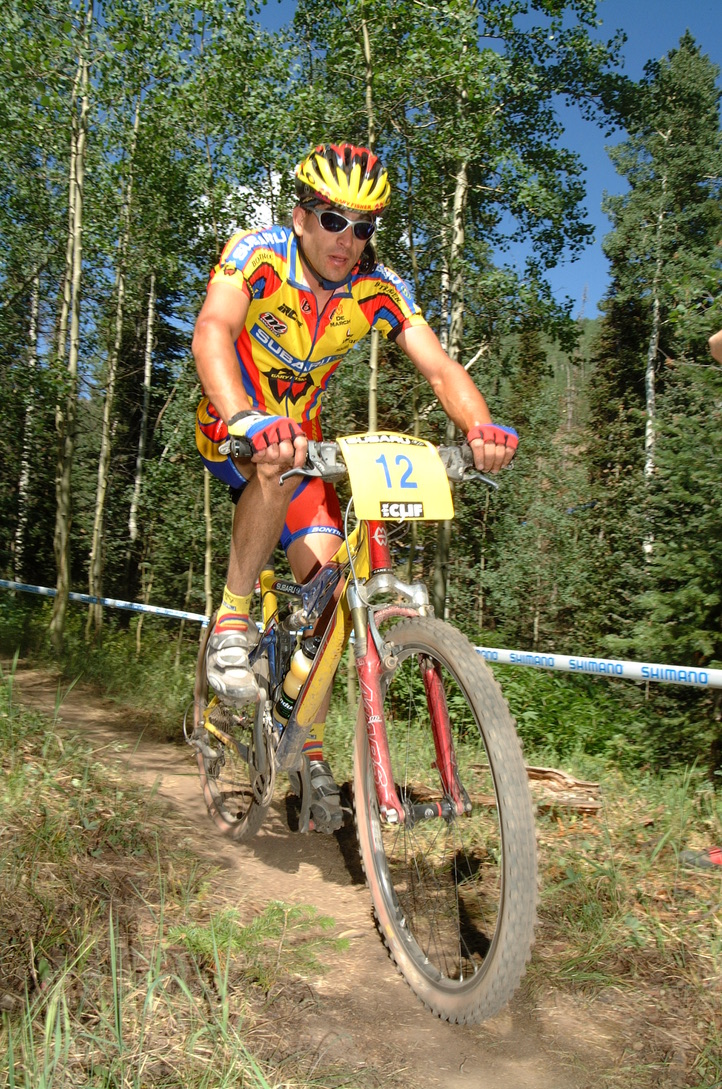
Nat Ross of Subaru-Gary Fisher 1999

Although no longer active as a full-time professional mountain bike racer, Ross has continued to challenge himself through Enduro's, Ultra-distance events, gravel racing, cross-country events and E-MTB.

Ross also worked with Keith Bontrager on the first set of 29 inch wheels for a mountain bike, building the set by hand in Bontrager's garage in Santa Cruz, CA.

Ross was inducted into the Mountain Bike Hall of Fame in 2008 with close friends Brian Lopes and Steve Blick. Ross is the Event Director for the Big Sugar Gravel Race and promated by lifetime in Bentonville, Arkansas.

== Personal life ==
Nat Ross is married to Aimee Ross, a cycling industry professional and currently the director of Bike Bentonville in Bentonville, Arkansas. They met in 2009 and were married in 2012.

He is the founder and CEO of Tough Guy Productions, a national event promotion company based in Golden, Colorado that specializes in cycling events, ski promotions, extreme competitions, and backcountry ski movies like Bliss and Incognito and started a women's cycling team Tough Girl Cycling. Ross currently is the co-founder of Bike School Bentonville, AR.

In addition to his business activities, Ross also acts as a consultant for outdoor industry manufacturers and coaches and trains younger athletes in a variety of disciplines through The academy in Bentonville, Arkansas .

== Career Achievements/Awards ==
- International Mountain Bicycling Association Honorary Board of Directors
- National Interscholastic Cycling Association Advisory Board of Directors
- 2000 24 Hour NORBA Nationals, Winter Park, CO - 1st *Course Record, National Champion
- 2001 24 Hour NORBA Nationals at Winter Park- 2nd
- 2003 24 Hour Global Solo Championships, Birmingham UK,- 1 st *Course Record
- 2004 24 Hour Global Solo Championships, Birmingham UK- 1st
- 2004 24 Hours of Moab-1st
- 2005 100-Mile NORBA National Championships, Brian Head, UT-1st National Champion
- 2007 2007 Winter Park PATCO Winter Triathlon Pan American Championship
- 2007 24 HR NORBA National Championships, Wausau, WI—2nd
- 2007 Race Across America (RAAM) 4-Man Team Champions
- 2012 24 Hours of Old Pueblo—Duo Pro Category w/ Rebecca Rusch—1st
- 2013 24 Hours of Old Pueblo—Duo Pro Category w/ Rebecca Rusch —1st
- 2019 UCI World Mountain Bike Championships (E-MTB) Mont Sainte-Anne, Canada –31st
- 2020 UCI World Mountain Bike Championships (E-MTB) Leogang, Austria –33rd
- 2021UCI World Mountain Bike Championships (E-MTB) Val di Sole, Italy –31st

The King and Queen of Pain, Nat Ross and Rebecca Rusch, after winning the 24 Hours of Old Pueblo

Ross used his education in Biochemistry to win a gold medal in the American Wheat category in the Great American Beer Festival in 1997 while he was the Brewmaster for Breckenridge Brewery.
