= The Last Kilometer =

- Directed by: Paolo Casalis
- Written by: Paolo Casalis
- Produced by: Stuffilm Creativeye
- Starring: Ignazio Moser & Francesco Moser, Davide Rebellin, Gianni Mura, Didi Senft
- Music by: Mario Poletti
- Release date: 2012
- Running time: 52 minutes
- Country: Italy
- Languages: Italian, German, English

The Last Kilometer (original title: L'Ultimo Chilometro) is a 2012 Italian documentary film directed by Paolo Casalis.

== Summary ==
The film is portrait of road cycling made through 4 characters: Ignazio Moser and his father Francesco Moser, Davide Rebellin, Gianni Mura, Didi Senft.

== See also ==
- List of films about bicycles and cycling
