= Bicycle (film) =

2014 documentary film

- Directed by: Michael B. Clifford
- Written by: Michael B. Clifford
- Produced by: Sarah Green; Stuart MacLean; Pip Piper
- Cinematography: David Cawley
- Edited by: Nina Jones
- Production company: Blue Hippo Media
- Release date: 2014
- Running time: 90 minutes
- Country: United Kingdom
- Language: English

Bicycle is a 2014 documentary film that was written and directed by Michael B. Clifford. In the documentary Clifford traces the rise and fall of the bicycle and bicycle culture in Great Britain from its origins to modern day.

== Synopsis ==
The documentary focuses on the history and culture of the bicycle in Great Britain and out the history and features conversations with numerous historians, designers, Olympic athletes, and youth.

== Development ==
In an interview with Single Track World magazine Clifford stated that he chose to make Bicycle because it "It just seemed to be the right time to be doing it; because the film's about Britain, and I think that bikes in the UK are in a very interesting place at the moment".

== Reception ==
Bicycle has received praise from critics and cycling organizations such as the London Cycling Campaign. According to roadcc, the film 'takes a humorous look at the sport of cycling, charting its Victorian origins up to the present day [and] features cameos from Sir Dave Brailsford and Chris Boardman amongst other well-known faces.' The Scotsman also reviewed Bicycle, writing that "Engaging pedal through British cycling from its origins to the current popularity of figureheads such as Sir Chris Hoy, with contributions from bike designers, historians and sports stars." Cycling UK has listed it as one of their top 10 cycling films as of 2016 and praised it as "a uniquely British look at the history and impact of the bike and cycling on these shores."

== See also ==
- List of films about bicycles and cycling
