= List of people from Southfields =

Southfields is a district in the London Borough of Wandsworth. The following is a list of those people who were either born or live(d) in Southfields, or had some important contribution to make to the district.

- Mirza Masroor Ahmad - the elected spiritual leader of the worldwide Ahmadiyya Muslim Community
- John Creasey - English author
- Peter Duncan - British actor and television presenter, Blue Peter
- George Eliot - novelist, wrote The Mill on the Floss while living in Wimbledon Park Road
- George Entwistle - former Director-General of the BBC
- Phillip Glasier - expert on hawking and falconry, born in Southfields
- Will Greenwood - rugby player with Harlequins and England
- Andy Hamilton - scriptwriter of TV show Drop the Dead Donkey
- Alan Hudson - Chelsea and England footballer
- Ralph Ineson - actor
- Nigella Lawson - food writer and television cook, born in a maternity home on Albert Drive
- Tom Mann - trade unionist and leader of the London Dock strike of 1889
- Michael Meacher - Labour MP and former Minister
- Paul Merton - comedian, panelist for BBC's Have I Got News for You
- Jason Rebello - jazz pianist
- Paul Reedy - Australian rower and coach with British Rowing
- Eleanor Roosevelt - civil and human rights activist responsible for the adoption of the Universal Declaration of Human Rights, attended Allenswood Academy 1899-1902
- Simon Rose - journalist and broadcaster
- Dan Smith - member of indie/techno band Bastille
- Marie Souvestre - feminist educator, founder of Allenswood Academy and formative influence on Eleanor Roosevelt
- Jimmy White - English snooker player, six times World Championship finalist
