= Michael Clifford =

Michael, Mick or Mike Clifford may refer to:

- Michael Clifford (journalist), Irish author and journalist
- Michael Clifford (musician) (born 1995), Australian guitarist, bandmember of 5 Seconds of Summer
- Michael R. Clifford (1952–2021), American army officer and astronaut
- Michael B. Clifford, British filmmaker
- Michael K. Clifford, American education investor and advisor
- Mike Clifford (born 1943), American singer
- Mick Clifford (rugby union) (1916–1942), Australian rugby union player
