= Crossing America =

2024 documentary film about Jonas Deichmann's duathlon across USA

- Promo image for the film
- Produced by: Marcus Weinberg
- Starring: Jonas Deichmann
- Music by: Joel Hunger
- Release date: 14 January 2024
- Running time: 54 minutes
- Country: Germany
- Language: German with English subtitles

Crossing America is a 2024 documentary film directed by Marcus Weinberg focusing on Jonas Deichmann's duathlon across USA.

== Description ==
The film covers the entire 10'500 km duathlon - biking and running. First half of a trip is an unsupported bicycle journey from New York City to Los Angeles and the second half is running from Los Angeles back to New York. The culmination and the final stretch of the journey is a run in the 2024 New York Marathon.

== See also ==
- Jonas Deichmann
- Forrest Gump
- List of films about bicycles and cycling
