= Onna Keirin-ō =

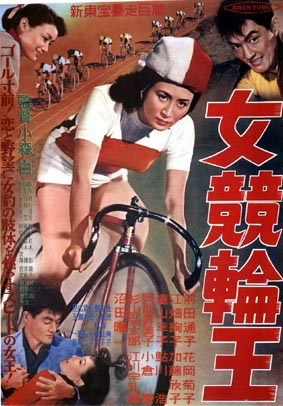
- Japanese movie poster
- Produced by: Shintoho
- Release date: 21 November 1956
- Running time: 89 minutes
- Country: Japan
- Language: Japanese

Onna Keirin-ō (女競輪王) is a 1956 black-and-white Japanese film directed by Haku Komori

It is a sport film about Keirin cycle racing.

== Cast ==
- Michiko Maeda as Miki Shiino
- Junko Ebata as Yoshiko Konishi
- Sachiko Tôyama as Keiko Hara
- Yôichi Numata as Shinya Kuramoto
- Sumiko Abe as Mieko Shibui
- Kôtarô Sugiyama as Kenichi Igarashi - Miki's Fiance
- Shigeru Ogura as Genzô Igarashi
- Noriko Kitazawa as Masae Shiino - Miki's Sister
- Fumiko Miyata as Hisako Akiyama
- Kikuko Hanaoka as Tomoe Shiino - Miki's Mother
- Hiroshi Ayukawa as Eiji Konishi
- Ureo Egawa as Mitarai
- Keiko Hamano
- Yuriko Kinoshita as Chisako Tahara
- Sachiko Harada - Bicycle Racer
- Kyôko Hinatsu
- Kôji Hirose
- Yoshiko Katô as Kiku Kôno
- Ichiro Kodama as Sugawara
- Akemi Nishi
- Ritsuko Nonomura as Setsuko Murakoshi
- Shinji Suzuki
- Chiyoko Tazawa

== See also ==
- List of films about bicycles and cycling
