= Road to Paris =

2001 film

- Starring: Lance Armstrong; George Hincapie; Johan Bruyneel
- Release date: 2001
- Running time: 52 min. (intl. cut); 100 min. (DVD cut)
- Country: United States
- Language: English

Road to Paris is a 2001 documentary film showing the preparation of Lance Armstrong, then twice winner of Tour de France, and his team, US Postal Service Pro Cycling Team, for the 2001 Tour de France. The film was shot during April, covering races such as Circuit de la Sarthe, Gent–Wevelgem, Paris–Roubaix and Amstel Gold Race, mainly featuring Lance Armstrong and George Hincapie. The film was produced by Nike, Inc.

== See also ==
- List of films about bicycles and cycling
