= The Limit Is Just Me =

Movie about world's longest triathlon, Das Limit bin nur ich

The Limit is Just Me
- Movie poster
- German: Das Limit bin nur ich
- Directed by: Markus Weinberg; Steffi Rostoski
- Written by: Markus Weinberg
- Produced by: Dorit Jeßner, Uwe Nadler
- Cinematography: Hans Bauer, Uwe Nadler, Armin Riedel, Daniel Rintz, Markus Weinberg
- Edited by: Javier Sobremazas
- Music by: Dan Riley
- Production company: Ravir Film
- Distributed by: Rise And Shine
- Release dates: 8 May 2022 (DOK.fest München); 15 October 2022 (Warsaw Film Festival); 20 March 2023 (Sofia Film Fest); 1 June 2023 (online)
- Running time: 105 minutes
- Country: Germany
- Languages: German; English; Spanish

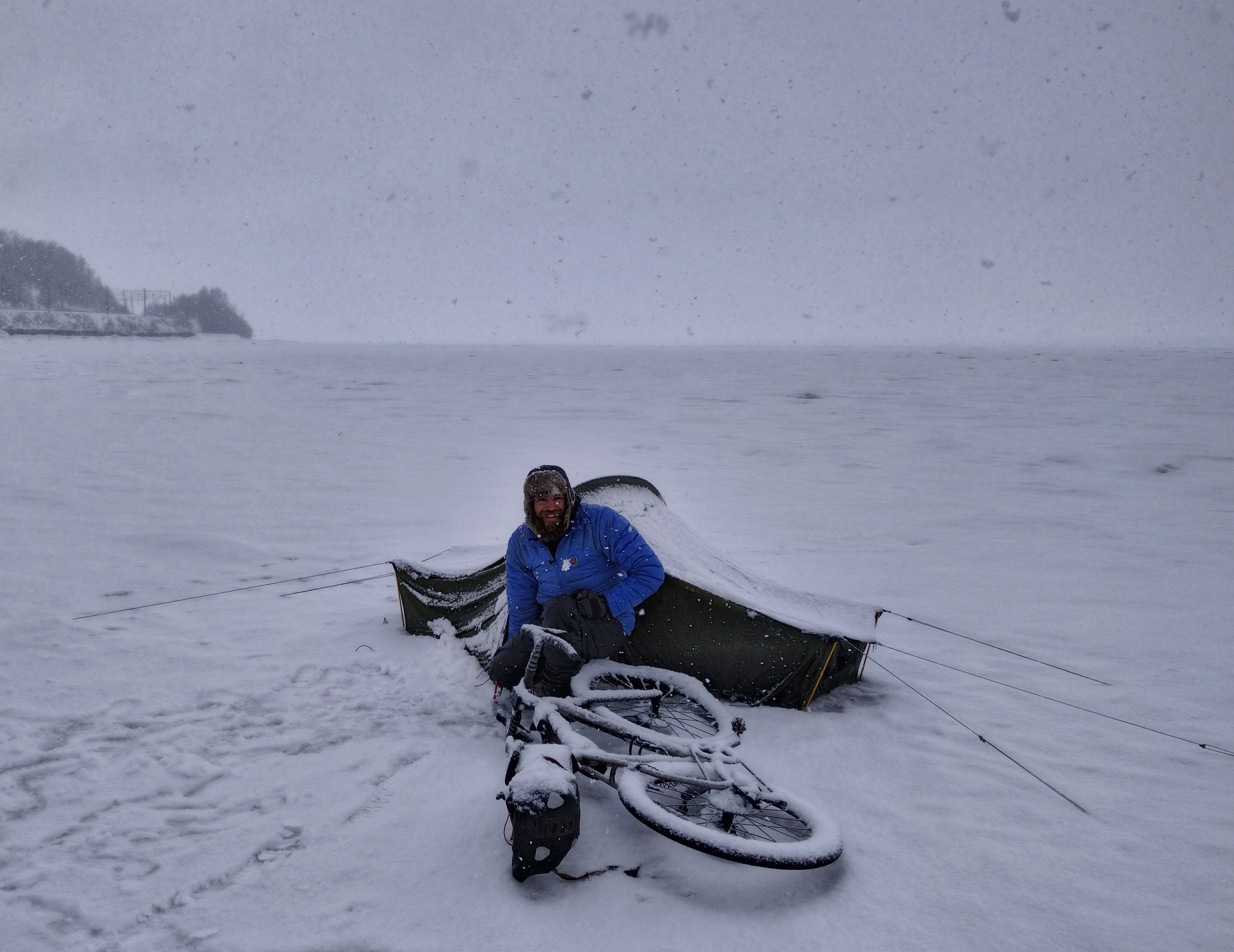
Jonas Deichmann on frozen Lake Baikal, during his record-braking world’s longest triathlon

The Limit is Just Me (German: Das Limit bin nur ich) is a 2022 German documentary film by Markus Weinberg and Steffi Rostoski. There is also a bestseller book by the same name.

The film follows adventurer and multiple world record holder Jonas Deichmann as he completes the longest triathlon of all time. The around-the-world journey took to 18 countries in 14 months. It started in Munich and finished in Munich, after a combined 460 kilometers of swimming, 21000 kilometers of cycling, and 5000 kilometers of running. The journey happens during the height of COVID-19 pandemic which presents a list of challenges.

== Release and reception ==
The movie premiered at the DOK.fest München on 8 May 2022 and was subsequently released in German cinemas starting on 19 May 2022. It was shown during various film festivals in Munich, Buenos Aires, Tallinn, Sofia, Warsaw, Pforzheim and elsewhere.

"Das Limit bin nur ich" won "Audience Awards", as one of the 5 documentaries most liked by the audience at the 38th Warsaw International Film Festival and was also nominated for "Free Spirit Prize". The movie also won "The Audience Award" at Buenos Aires Running Film Festival and won "Home Selection" at DOK.fest München.

The movie popularised expression "Jonas effect" – remaining hopeful through the struggles and dark moments.

Name in other regions
| Region | Name |
|---|---|
| Europe | Jonas Deichmann - The Limit is Just Me |
| Canada | Jonas Deichmann - Breaking the Limit |
| Germany | Jonas Deichmann - Das Limit bin nur ich |
| Poland | Jonas Deichmann - Przekraczanie Granic |
| Italy | Jonas Deichmann - Il nostro limite siamo noi |
| Estonia | Jonas Deichmann – Piiriks olen üksnes mina |

== Soundtrack ==
The soundtrack for Das Limit bin nur ich was made by Dan Riley and is made available on various audio streaming platforms including Spotify, Apple Music, Amazon Music, Deezer, Bandcamp, Boomplay, Hearnow and others.

== Book ==
There is a book by the same name (Das Limit bin nur ich) which covers Jonas triathlon around the world. The book is available since December 2021 and an audiobook version is available since February 2022. The audiobook version is 5h and 30min long.

As of late 2023, the audiobook is a bestseller on Audible and the printed book is an Amazon bestseller in the triathlon category. It is also a Der Spiegel bestseller.

== See also ==
- Jonas Deichmann
- Forrest Gump
- World Bicycle Relief
- Without Limits
- List of films about bicycles and cycling
- List of films about the sport of athletics
