= Fritz Erler School (Pforzheim) =

High school in Pforzheim, Germany

Location
- Westliche Karl-Friedrich-Straße 215; Pforzheim 75172; 48°53′26″N 08°40′38″E

Information
- Type: High School; day
- Established: 1964; 62 years ago
- Gender: Coeducational
- Enrollment: around 2,000
- Student to teacher ratio: 17:1
- Website: www.fes-pforzheim.de

Fritz Erler school is a vocational school, a Wirtschaftsgymnasium and business high school of the city of Pforzheim. It was named after the politician Fritz Erler. In 1998, it was the largest school in the administrative district of Karlsruhe and housed the largest high school in southern Germany. With almost 2000 pupils, it is the largest school in Pforzheim and the Enzkreis.

== History ==
The origins of the school date back to 1859, when Carl Zerrenner, the then Mayor of Pforzheim, arranged a trade course. The reason was the increasing importance of jewellery industry in the city. It became an upper secondary school in 1898, and was allowed to call itself a "commercial school". From 1899, girls were also admitted to the school. The school became independent in 1911. On July 4, 1967, the school was renamed to "Fritz Erler School".

== The Fritz Erler Prize ==
It is an annual prize awarded by the city of Pforzheim to the best graduates of the Fritz Erler School. The prize is a medal with the inscription: "A people needs knowledge of its history, but it must live in the present and for the future" (German: Ein Volk braucht die Erkenntnis seiner Geschichte, aber es muss in der Gegenwart und für die Zukunft leben).

== Notable alumni ==
- Jonas Deichmann, adventurer, extreme athlete, and holder of multiple world records
- Dieter Kosslick, former director of Berlin International Film Festival
- Stefan Mappus, Minister President of the state of Baden-Württemberg
- Götz Wörner, music producer
- Cornelia Petzold-Schick, mayor of Bruchsal
- Michael Baral, actor
