= Blood Road (film) =

2017 documentary

- Theatrical release poster
- Directed by: Nicholas Schrunk
- Written by: Mark Anders
- Produced by: Sandra Kuhn
- Starring: Rebecca Rusch; Huyen Nguyen; Don Duvall
- Cinematography: Ryan Young
- Edited by: Emad Hashim
- Music by: Keith Kenniff
- Production company: Red Bull Media House
- Release date: March 15, 2017
- Running time: 96 minutes
- Countries: Laos; Vietnam; Cambodia; United States
- Languages: English; Vietnamese; Lao

Blood Road is a 2017 documentary film directed by Nicholas Schrunk and produced by Red Bull. It stars endurance mountain biker Rebecca Rusch, Vietnamese cyclist Huyen Nguyen and cartographer Don Duvall. The film chronicles the journey of Rusch traversing over 1,200 miles (1,900 km) on bicycle along the Ho Chi Minh trail to the site where her father, a US Air Force F-4 fighter pilot, was shot down in Laos 40 years earlier. It won numerous best of festival awards and a News & Documentary Emmy Award in 2018.

== Production ==
The film was produced over two years, starting with an initial scout trip to Laos in December, 2014 with principal photography happening over 28 days in February/March 2015. The production team of six members, four of which were ex-professional athletes themselves, were limited to traversing on Honda CRF 250cc dual-sport motorcycles. Two crew members were injured in motorcycle accidents from the jungle terrain, one suffering a shoulder injury and another, a ruptured achilles tendon. The core production team collectively rode over 24,000 miles on motorcycle over the course of production.

According to Andrew Fish of American Cinematographer. "The camera team used a unique combination of RED digital cinema cameras and Cooke anamorphic lenses to capture the film. Subsequent modifications were made to other smaller format action cameras such as GoPros to modify the lenses to fit the anamorphic profile.". They also extensively used the Freefly Systems MoVI gimbal which they affixed to motorcycles, drones, rickshaws and trucks.

The film was finished in 4K with Dolby enlisted to audio-mix the film using Dolby Atmos technology. The on-screen graphics, directed by John Likens were of note for their creation from 8mm US Air Force footage, GPS points and OpenStreetMap data.

== Release ==
The film premiered at the Sun Valley Film Festival in January 2017 where it received the audience choice award. It was released nationally with a US tour March 15, 2017. It has since been translated into several different languages, including Vietnamese.

=== Reception ===
Kimber Myers of The Los Angeles Times had a positive review calling it a "moving experience for both its subjects and the audience". Bayo Olukotun of The Huffington Post described the filmmaking as "purposeful storytelling that transcends the action sports subset". Kristin Blush of Bust Magazine notes, "it captures an important part of U.S. history, shows the scars and torment that war leaves behind, promotes forgiveness, and shows how badass women are.

=== Accolades ===
The film was awarded numerous best of festival and audience awards at the Wasatch Mountain Film Festival l, Banff Mountain Film Festival, Bentonville Film Festival, Breckenridge Film Festival and Sun Valley Film Festival. It was nominated for one Sports Emmy Award in 2018 and two News & Documentary Emmy Awards in 2018, winning for Outstanding Graphic Design & Art Direction. Additionally, it won a Shorty Award for social good for its partnership with demining efforts in Laos.

The film won the Grand Prize at the 2017 Kendal Mountain Festival.

== Philanthropy ==
Following the production of the film, Rusch’s experience witnessing the lasting effects of the Vietnam War first-hand inspired the inception of the Be Good[TM] Foundation. Rusch’s Father signed every letter home with “Be Good,” and Rusch took that message and turned it into a mission. By using the bicycle as a catalyst for healing, empowerment, and evolution, the Be Good Foundation is a call to action to live with purpose, explore with passion and create lasting change. The Be Good Foundation supports a number of organizations that support cyclists of all ages and backgrounds as well as planet Earth by fighting climate change and maintaining public land access.

Most notably is the support of MAG, an organization that assists people affected by landmines and unexploded ordnance, to donate proceeds from the film to unexploded ordnance removal efforts. Laos is the most heavily bombed country in the world with over two million tons of ordnance dropped over 580,000 bombing missions during the Vietnam war which was featured in the film's story. The film's lead, Rebecca Rusch continues to travel to Laos to promote the clean-up and raise money and awareness for the cause.

== See also ==
- List of films about bicycles and cycling

== Reception ==
- Blood Road at Rotten Tomatoes
