= Vive le Tour =

- Directed by: Louis Malle
- Written by: Louis Malle
- Cinematography: Ghislain Cloquet; Jacques Ertaud; Louis Malle; Jean Bobet
- Edited by: Suzanne Baron; Kenout Peltier
- Music by: Georges Delerue
- Distributed by: The Criterion Collection (USA)
- Release date: October 1962
- Running time: 18 minutes
- Country: France
- Language: French

Vive le Tour is a 1962 French documentary by filmmaker Louis Malle. It chronicles the 1962 Tour de France and focuses on issues such as providing food for the racers, dealing with injuries and doping. The New York Times describes the film as containing "ebullience, whimsy, jet black humor, awe and unspeakable tragedy" and as "a worshipful documentary of a sport made by a man who knew it intimately and loved it." Vive le Tour won the Dok Leipzig Golden Dove award in 1966.

Jean Bobet, a cyclist himself and brother of the great Louison Bobet, is the voice-over in this documentary.

The 18-minute film is available on DVD from The Criterion Collection as part of their Eclipse series.

== See also ==
- List of films about bicycles and cycling
