= Tour de France: Unchained =

Documentary television series

- Genre: Docudrama
- Composer: Si Begg
- Countries of origin: France, United Kingdom
- Original languages: English, French
- No. of seasons: 3
- No. of episodes: 24

Production
- Executive producers: James Gay-Rees; Paul Martin; Amelia Hann; Yann Le Bourbouach
- Editors: Franco Bogino; Luca Salvatori; Charlie Webb
- Running time: 45 minutes
- Production companies: Box to Box Films; Quad

Original release
- Network: Netflix
- Release: 8 June 2023 – 2 July 2025

Tour de France: Unchained is a television documentary series that gives a behind-the-scenes look at the major road cycling race the Tour de France.

== About ==
Released on 8 June 2023, the first season of Tour de France: Unchained followed selected riders and their teams through the 2022 Tour de France. The show attempts to give viewers a behind-the-scenes look at one of the world's most prestigious cycling races.

The series is produced by the same team from the Netflix series Formula 1: Drive to Survive and follows a similar structure.

The first season featured 8 of the Tour's 22 teams, in 8 episodes lasting around 40 minutes each. One of the biggest stars of the 2022 Tour de France, defending champion Tadej Pogačar, did not feature in this season after his team, UAE Team Emirates, opted out of any involvement.

The show returned for a second season following the 2023 Tour de France. The third season, covering the 2024 Tour de France, premiered in July of 2025. In February 2025, Netflix announced that the show will not return for a fourth season.

== Episodes ==
=== Season 1 ===
Season 1 covers the 2022 Tour de France.

No.	Title	Original release date
1	"The Grand Départ"	8 June 2023
With mere days to go, Quick-Step Alpha Vinyl announces its lineup and assesses the odds. Fabio Jakobsen strives to sprint his way to a comeback.
2	"Welcome to Hell"	8 June 2023
Stacked with fierce riders, team Jumbo-Visma takes on the cobblestones, but mechanical challenges and internal competition make for a chaotic stage.
3	"The Weight of a Nation"	8 June 2023
A third of the way into the race with no wins for France, Groupama-FDJ and AG2R-Citroën enter the mountain stage with the eyes of a nation upon them.
4	"Attack, Counter Attack"	8 June 2023
During the Granon stage, Jonas Vingegaard makes a bid for the yellow jersey, but when a swift Slovenian gets in his way, Jumbo-Visma changes its plan of attack.
5	"Breakneck Speed"	8 June 2023
As EF Education-EasyPost strategically showcases its young talent, the INEOS Grenadiers consider using their secret weapon, newcomer Thomas Pidcock.
6	"Plan B"	8 June 2023
When the leader drops out, Alpecin-Deceuninck hedges its bets on Jasper "Disaster" Philipsen.
7	"Everything for the Podium"	8 June 2023
The last week of the tour arrives. With his legacy on the line, 2018 winner Geraint Thomas battles Groupama-FDJ leader David Gaudu for a podium spot.
8	"Road to Paris"	8 June 2023
A final push in the mountains remains between the sprinters and Paris. While Fabio Jakobsen finds his fire, Jonas Vingegaard and Wout van Aert fight Tadej Pogačar to the finish.

=== Season 2 ===
Season 2 covers the 2023 Tour de France.

No.	Title	Original release date
1	"No Risk, No Reward"	11 June 2024
In the wake of a tragic accident, a shaky peloton starts off the tour in Basque country as team EF Education-EasyPost pins all its hopes on one rider.
2	"The Third Man"	11 June 2024
Ben O'Connor, the new leader of team AG2R-Citroën, sets his sights on the first mountain stage as fellow Australian, Jai Hindley, vies for the same win.
3	"No Mercy"	11 June 2024
Alpecin-Deceuninck's star sprinter, Jasper Philipsen, stops at nothing to win every sprint stage, while Mark Cavendish looks to set a new tour record.
4	"For Gino"	11 June 2024
Having recently lost their beloved friend and team member Gino Mäder, the riders of team Bahrain Victorious are determined to win a stage in his honour.
5	"The Enemy Within"	11 June 2024
As INEOS-Grenadiers leader Tom Pidcock struggles to adapt to a shifting team strategy, Stage 14 sees Tadej Pogačar encounter a frustrating obstacle.
6	"Domination"	11 June 2024
Stage 16 brings about a gruelling time trial that ends with a vertiginous climb. As Jonas Vingegaard excels, suspicions about his performance arise.
7	"Kamikaze Mission"	11 June 2024
Faced with their worst ever tour, Soudal Quick-Step turns to Julian Alaphilippe for a stage win, but, team tensions and past injury may get in the way.
8	"The Last Dance"	11 June 2024
An adoring crowd awaits Thibaut Pinot on his last ever mountain stage. As the peloton reaches the Champs-Élysées, Jasper Philipsen strives to win again.

=== Season 3 ===
Season 3 covers the 2024 Tour de France.

No.	Title	Original release date
1	"David v Goliath"	2 July 2025
As the Tour kicks off in Florence, less-funded teams fight to compete, while Jonas Vingegaard's team worries about the impact of his recent crash.
2	"Disruptors"	2 July 2025
With Primoz Roglic and Remco Evenepoel both vying for C, the race for the yellow jersey blows wide open: there are now four elite riders in the mix.
3	"Adapt or Die"	2 July 2025
As Decathlon-AG2R La Mondale enters a new era of competitive cycling, intense pressure mounts on the coaching team and the riders to deliver results.
4	"Road to Hell"	2 July 2025
For GC riders, racing over dusty gravel roads is a nightmare, but Tom Pidcock and Anthony Turgis see it as a golden opportunity to secure a stage win.
5	"The Comeback"	2 July 2025
Doubts still persist about Jonas Vingegaard's performance at the halfway point of the Tour. Could a grueling 11th stage get him back on track?
6	"History Makers"	2 July 2025
Mark Cavendish aims to make history with a 35th stage win, but must contend with champion sprinter Jasper Philipsen and the up-and-coming Biniam Girmay.
7	"King of the Mountain"	2 July 2025
Chasing a stage win, EF Education-EasyPost pins their hopes on dogged climber Richard Carapaz, but he'll have to outpace the unstoppable Tadej Pogadar.
8	"Take a Bow"	2 July 2025
In the final stages of the 2024 Tour, Felix Gall endures the expectations of a top 10 finish, while Jonas makes a last play for victory against Tadej.

== Criticism ==
While the show generally received positive reviews, there has been some criticism from riders about how they have been portrayed by the show. In particular, Wout van Aert, who rides for Team Jumbo–Visma, was unhappy about how he was portrayed during the show, telling Sporza, "It's quite disturbing that there were stories written in the documentary that weren't there. For me, the series is focused on commotion."

== See also ==
- List of films about bicycles and cycling
