= Fritz Erler (politician) =

German politician (1913–1967)

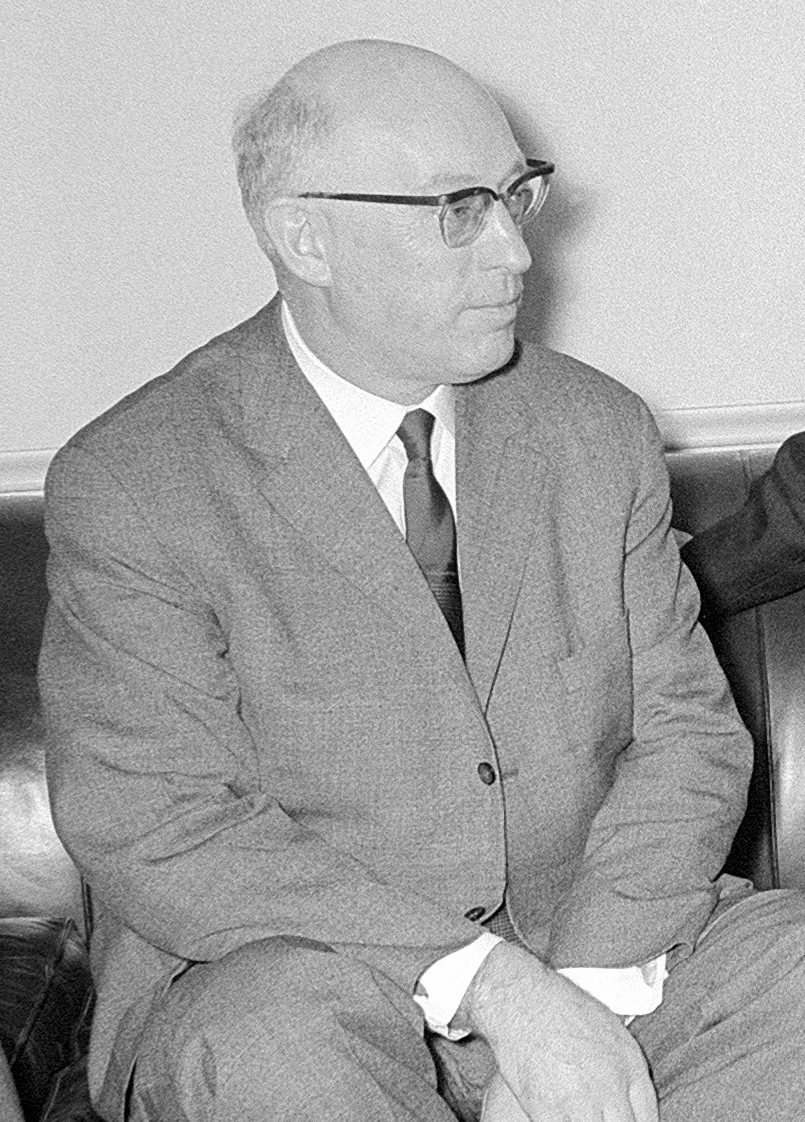
- Erler in 1965

Member of the Bundestag
- In office 7 September 1949 – 22 February 1967

Personal details
- Born: 14 July 1913; Berlin, Germany
- Died: 22 February 1967 (aged 53)
- Political party: SPD

Fritz Erler (14 July 1913 – 22 February 1967) was a German politician representing the Social Democratic Party (SPD). From 1953 to 1957, he was Deputy Chairman of the Defense Committee of the Bundestag, the West German parliament. In this role, Erler played an important role in drafting the legislation that ensured democratic control of the Bundeswehr, West Germany's new armed forces.

Erler became a member of the Socialist Worker Youth in 1928 and in 1931 he joined the SPD. Erler served as a municipal official until the Nazis arrested him in 1938 and imprisoned him on treason charges. After the end of the Second World War, Erler became involved in politics on the state level before being elected to the Bundstag at 1949, when he was 36 years old. Erler thereafter became an expert on defense policy within the SPD. He was deputy chair of the defense committee in the Bundstag from 1953 to 1957.

Erler was elected, without opposition, as one of two deputy chairman of the SPD in 1964 at the special party congress in Bad Godesberg. At the same Congress, Herbert Wehner was elected deputy chairman and Willy Brandt was elected party chairman. Erler served as deputy chairman until his death.

Erler died at his home in Pforzheim in southern Germany on 22 February 1967, at age 53. His daughter, Gisela Erler, would become a left-wing feminist publisher, entrepreneur and, from 2011 to 2021, a member of the state government of Baden-Württemberg.

There are high schools in Pforzheim and Tuttlingen named after Fritz Erler.
