= Cape to Cape (film) =

2021 documentary film

- Cover image of the film
- Directed by: Pasi Sauna-aho; Pål Laukli
- Starring: Jonas Deichmann, Philipp Hympendahl
- Music by: Timo Kämäräinen; Alexi Tuomarila
- Release date: January 28, 2021

Cape to Cape is a 2021 documentary film directed by Pasi Sauna-aho and Pål Laukli, released on January 28, 2021.

== Overview ==
The film chronicles the journey of the fastest unsupported bicycle crossing from North Cape in Norway to Cape Town in South Africa. In 2019, Jonas Deichmann and Philipp Hympendahl took 72 days to cover 18,000 kilometers across 14 countries and two continents.

The film covers physical and emotional demands of the journey. High points like the stunning landscapes and the hospitality of the people and the low points like food poisoning, violent riots, nights in prison cells and tensions among the cycling partners. There is also a German book by the same name about the same bicycle journey.

== Reception ==
The documentary was official selection at Berlin Indie Film Festival, ARFF Paris, and ARFF Amsterdam.

== See also ==
- Jonas Deichmann
- Forrest Gump
- List of films about bicycles and cycling
