= The Flying Scotsman (2006 film) =

- Promotional poster
- Directed by: Douglas Mackinnon
- Written by: John Brown; Declan Hughes; Simon Rose
- Starring: Jonny Lee Miller; Laura Fraser; Billy Boyd; Brian Cox
- Cinematography: Gavin Finney
- Edited by: Colin Monie
- Music by: Martin Phipps
- Production companies: Metro-Goldwyn-Mayer Pictures; Scion Films; Scottish Screen; Zero West Filmproduktion
- Distributed by: MGM Distribution Co. (United States); Verve Pictures (United Kingdom)
- Release dates: 16 August 2006 (Edinburgh Film Festival); 29 June 2007 (United Kingdom)
- Running time: 96 minutes
- Countries: United Kingdom; Germany; United States
- Language: English
- Budget: $11 million
- Box office: $1.2 million

The Flying Scotsman is a 2006 British drama film, based on the life and career of Scottish amateur cyclist Graeme Obree. The film covers the period of Obree's life that saw him take, lose, and then retake the world one-hour distance record. The film stars Jonny Lee Miller as Obree, Laura Fraser, Billy Boyd, and Brian Cox.

== Plot ==
The film starts with Graeme Obree (Miller), who suffers from a depressive moment (which we learn is due to a crippling bipolar disorder), cycling into a wood where he attempts to hang himself. A flashback to Obree's (Sean Brown) childhood depicts him being physically attacked at school by other pupils, leaving the young Graeme with severe psychological scars. One day Obree is given a bicycle by his parents which we see Obree using to evade his bullies.

As the film progresses, the adult Obree is now married to Anne with a child. In between competing in local races, he runs a failing bicycle shop and has to supplement his income as a bicycle courier. Graeme encounters Malky McGovern (Boyd), a fellow bike courier, who recognises Graeme and they become fast friends. While working in his shop an older gentleman called Baxter (Cox), asks Graeme to repair his old bike. Graeme agrees after roping Baxter into being the judge over a race with a local van driver. Graeme narrowly beats the driver but the van steers into him. Baxter takes an immediate liking to Graeme but feels a darkness in the younger man.

Graeme decides to try to beat the hour record. However, he has neither the funding nor the quality of the bicycle required. Determined to succeed, he asks Malky to take over his management and fundraising from his wife Anne who is overwhelmed with work and raising their child. Baxter turns out to be a boatyard owner and offers Graeme and Malky his yard to build a fitting bike. Graeme sets himself 8 weeks to build a bike, raise funds for the challenge, and pay for access to a fitting velodrome. The driving force for such a tight deadline is due to Chris Boardman's attempt to break the record in the 9th week.

Graeme manages to build a revolutionary prototype called Old Faithful, for maximum efficiency, made up of scrap metal and components from a washing machine. Malky chastises Graeme that they cannot attempt the record using Old Faithful as Boardman is going to be using a bike specially designed by computers and costing £500,000. Nevertheless, Malky, Anne, and Graeme arrive in Norway for their attempt, and Graeme is derided by officials. Malky reveals to Graeme that he has had a proper bike built based on the prototype of Old Faithful. Graeme grudgingly agrees to use the new bike but his first attempt at the record proves to be a failure and he comes up short.

Graeme tells everyone he intends to go again as he has the velodrome booked for 24 hours. Due to the grueling nature of the 1-hour challenge, everyone cautions him against making a second attempt. Graeme devises a cunning way to prevent his body from seizing up and cramping and exercises throughout the night. The next morning he and Anne sleep in and rush to find Malky, who unknown to Graeme has rebuilt the bike using Old Faithful's parts. Graeme embarks on his attempts and this time is successful in beating the record.

However, his victory is short-lived as his record is broken by Chris Boardman (Adrian Grove, credited as Adrian Smith) a week later. The Union Cycliste Internationale holds a meeting where they devise rules to discourage Obree from using his experimental bicycle in the future. Obree is severely depressed the night following his record-making ride. This is exacerbated when Boardman breaks the record. When Obree is confronted in a pub by the four bullies who had victimised him years earlier at school, he becomes completely withdrawn and rarely leaves his house. Baxter attempts to counsel him, but Obree feels betrayed when he discovers that Baxter is the pastor of a local church and the younger Obree is agnostic towards religion.

He recovers enough to compete in the Individual Pursuit World Championship in 1993, in which he uses his bicycle design again. The UCI officials begin rigorously enforcing the new ruling, penalising him for riding in the "Tuck" stance that his bicycle design is intended to support. The physical and emotional exertion take their toll, and he crashes disastrously, breaking his arm.

The plot then returns to the opening of the film. The rope Graeme attempts to use to hang himself breaks, and he is found by another cyclist who summons the authorities. Graeme initially resists treatment, until Baxter tells him about his wife, who also suffered from bipolar disorder and ultimately took her own life. At Graeme's request, his wife, Anne, a hospital nurse, agrees to help him begin treatment.

Graeme later makes a comeback and regains the 1-hour record as well as his world title. The new bicycle configuration that he uses, which supports the "Superman" stance, is later banned by the UCI after eight riders win gold medals with it.

== Cast ==
- Jonny Lee Miller as Graeme Obree: The main character in the film. Jonny Lee Miller joined the project in 2002, and he and Obree spent time together, Miller keen to pick up mannerisms and speech patterns. Obree would later stand in for Miller during some cycling sequences in the film.
- Laura Fraser as Anne Obree: Obree's wife, who was once his manager. Laura Fraser had misgivings about playing Obree's wife, Anne, when she was sent Obree's autobiography from Douglas Mackinnon. "I wasn’t expecting to enjoy it as I thought it would be all about sport," said Laura, "but I got into the book straight away, it was absolutely compelling." It is the first time Fraser has played a real person and before filming began, she and Miller talked with the Obrees to help show their relationship during the film.
- Billy Boyd as Malky McGovern: Obree's manager. When approached to have a role in the film, Boyd knew only the "basic elements" of Obree's story. Boyd, being Scottish, felt it important to have the right script and further promote Scottish film.
- Brian Cox as Douglas Baxter: A minister who helps Obree chase his demons and concentrate on his goal. Cox, a seasoned actor, had been working in Europe before returning to Scotland to shoot the film. He commented that the story is one of "perseverance and passion". He said, since seeing the film, "[t]he end result is even better than I hoped – it's a masterpiece."
- Morven Christie as Katie, a friend of Anne and within the film, Malky's girlfriend

== Production ==
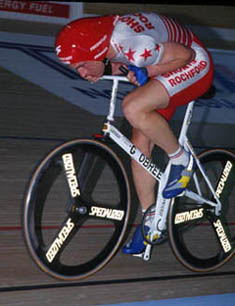
Graeme Obree on "Old Faithful", his home-made bicycle.

The Flying Scotsman first attracted screenwriter Simon Rose in 1994. Along with Rob Roy producer, Peter Broughan, and Scottish director, Douglas Mackinnon, he based the film's script on Obree's autobiography, also entitled The Flying Scotsman. The film, however, seemed doomed to fail and was canceled several times.

In 2002, the death of a key American investor caused The Flying Scotsman to collapse only days before shooting was planned to commence. East Ayrshire Council, who originally gave £5000 to fund the project, refused to give further finance, stating that it didn't feel it would contribute to the community. Producer, Broughan, called the decision "a disgrace". It took three years for the project to get back on track. Broughan was joined by producer Damita Nikapota on the project who secured pre-production finance from Freewheel Productions. Peter Broughan tried to sack the director Douglas Mackinnon but Damita Nikapota refused to let this happen.

Shooting of the film began on 7 July 2006 and ended on 4 September 2006. The film was shot largely in Galston, Scotland, with East Ayrshire, Glasgow and velodromes in Germany standing in for places in the story such as Colombia, France and Norway.

== Release ==
The Flying Scotsman's first country-wide release was in New Zealand, where the film reached number 2 in the box office and stayed in the top 8 for the first seven weeks of its release. The film kicked off the 60th Edinburgh Film Festival, and later was given a wide-release date of 29 June 2007. Metro-Goldwyn Mayer Pictures was the main distributor in the United States, and the film was released there first on 29 December 2006. It also received a limited release on 4 May 2007.

== Reception ==
Review aggregation website Rotten Tomatoes gives the film a score of 49% based on 53 reviews. The site's consensus reads: "The Flying Scotsman's too-brisk pacing reduces the scale of cyclist Graham Obree's accomplishments while not uncovering what makes him tick."

The film gained mixed reviews worldwide following its release, with most of the praise being aimed at Jonny Lee Miller's performance in the title role. Russell Baillie, a reviewer at the New Zealand Herald, gave the film four stars, commenting that it is "gripping, affecting and inspiring". John Daly-Peoples also praised the film, calling it "compelling & heart-warming". Bill Zwecker, of the Chicago Sun-Times, said "[t]urmoil and victory meet in remarkable Scotsman". Zwecker also called Miller's acting a "revelation". Tom Keogh also praised Miller's acting, calling him "enormously sympathetic and appealing" as Obree. He also gave acclaim to the "terrific supporting cast", commending Brian Cox.

Total Film gave the film a fairly negative review. The film magazine said the mesh of Obree's depression and the "Brit-flick furniture (loyal wife, rural scenery, gawky comic relief)" came off flat, "diminish[ing] rather than elevat[ing] its hero’s achievements". The Guardian also questioned the film's comedic aspect combined with the issue of Obree's condition. Obree is an "opaque and unsympathetic figure" in the film, said reviewer Peter Bradshaw, also calling the record-breaking attempts "weirdly anticlimactic and blank".

== See also ==
- List of films about bicycles and cycling
