= Jonas Deichmann =

German adventurer, extreme athlete, and author

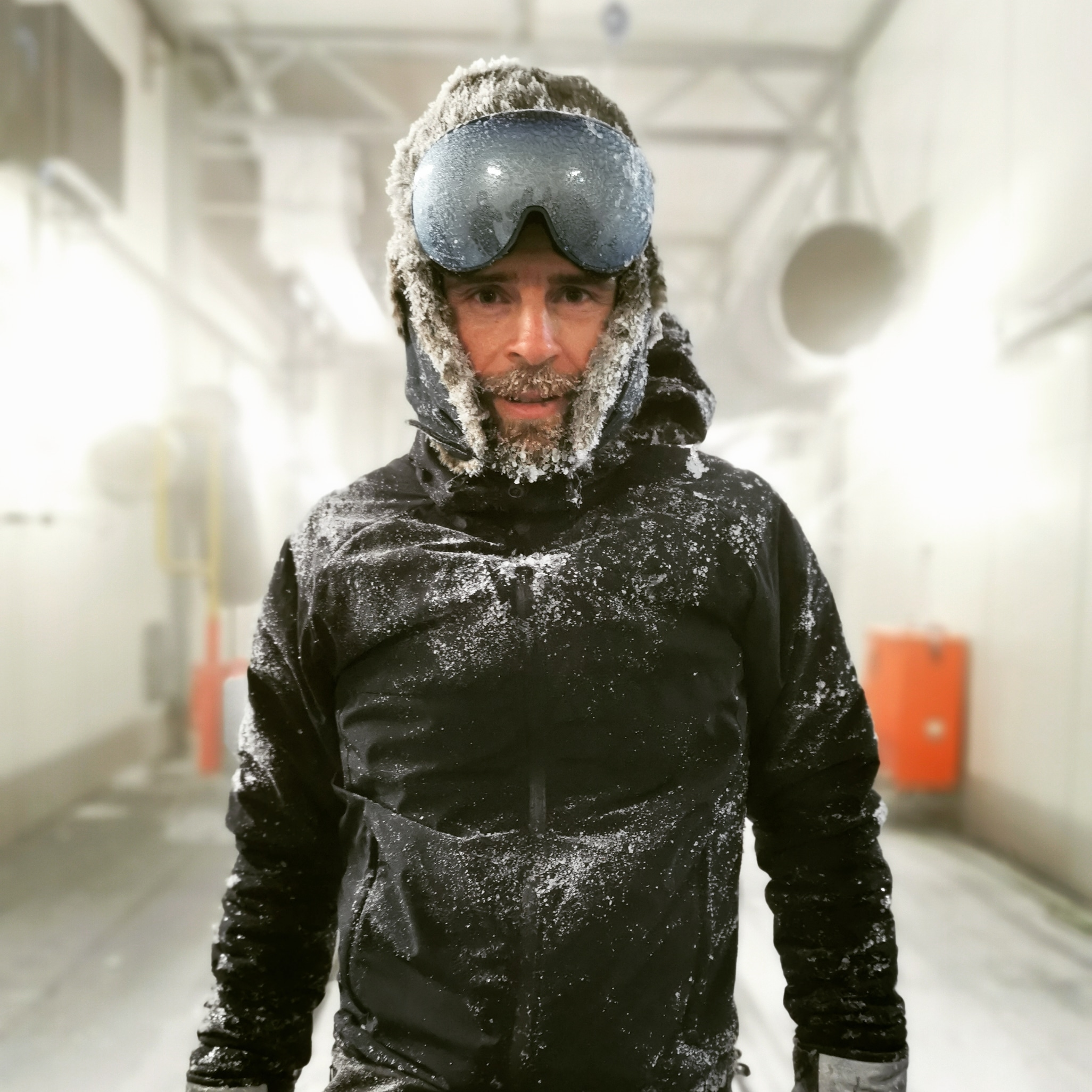
- Deichmann in 2020
- Born: 15 April 1987 (age 39); Stuttgart, Germany
- Education: Copenhagen Business School; Jönköping International Business School
- Occupations: Adventurer; Author; Extreme athlete; Motivational speaker
- Known for: World's first triathlon around the world Multiple world records.
- Height: 183 cm (6 ft 0 in)
- Website: jonasdeichmann.com

Jonas Deichmann (born 15 April 1987 in Stuttgart) is an author, adventurer, extreme athlete, and holder of multiple world records in cycling and endurance. He is a motivational speaker at German companies and sports teams.

== Early life ==
Jonas Deichmann was born on 15 April 1987 in Stuttgart, a city in the German state of Baden-Württemberg. During his childhood the family moved to the Black Forest where he grew up in Grunbach and Pforzheim and attended economics-oriented Fritz Erler high school in Pforzheim.

After high school, he studied International Business in Sweden, Brazil, Singapore, Denmark and India. He completed a BSc in Business Administration and Economics at Jönköping International Business School in 2012 followed by a master's degree from Copenhagen Business School in 2014. After university he returned to Germany and worked as a sales manager for a Swedish software company in Munich.

=== Family and relatives ===
Jonas' grandfather moved from Germany to West Africa, settled in Guinea, started working as a snake catcher and sailing around the world. According to Jonas, the grandfather was a big childhood influence and a hero figure who sparked Jonas' thirst for adventure.

== Expeditions ==
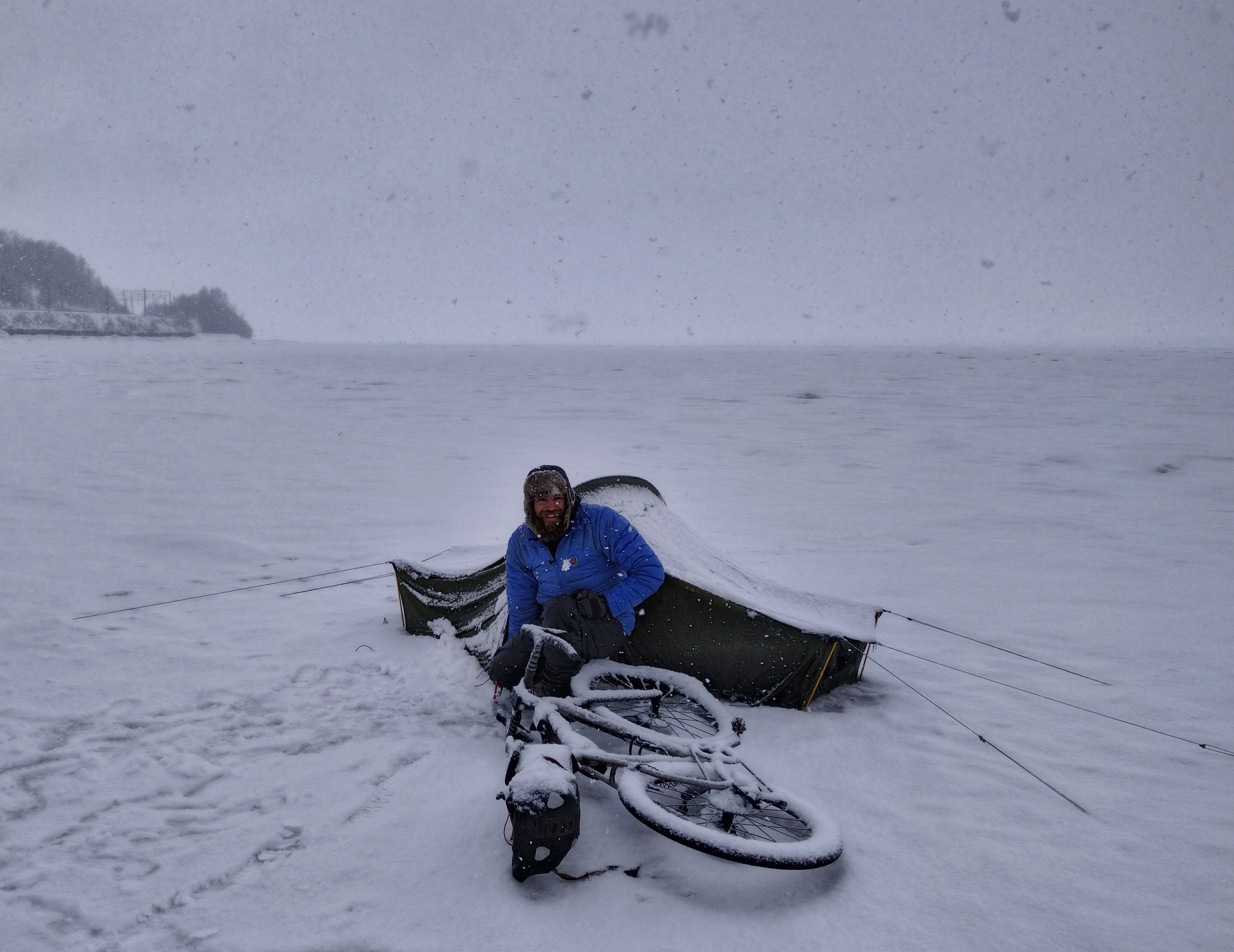
Deichmann during the triathlon around the world

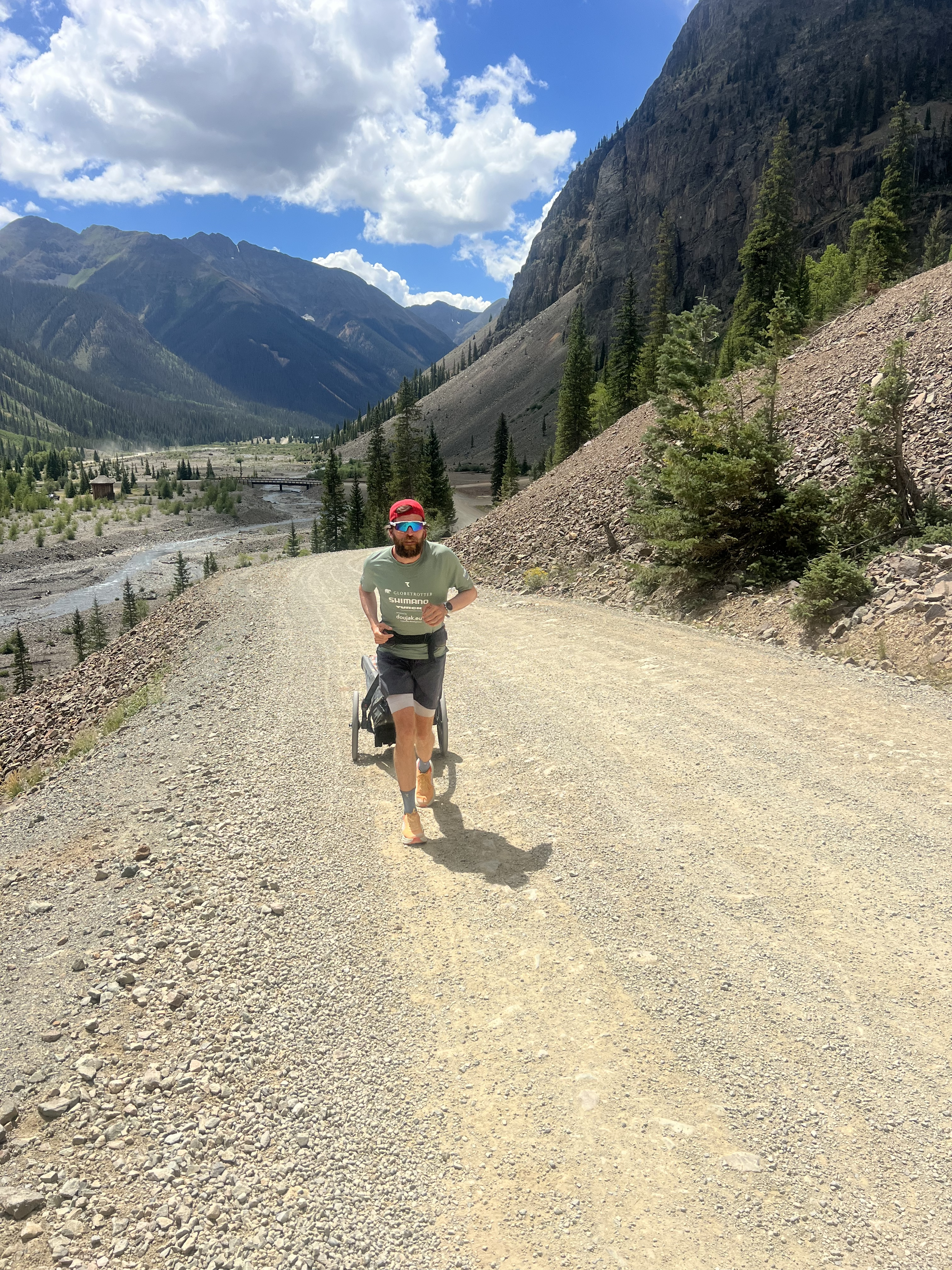
Deichmann photographed in the Rocky Mountains in 2023

=== 2017: Portugal to Vladivostok ===
In summer 2017 he cycled the 14331 km long route from Cabo da Roca in Portugal to Vladivostok in Russia in 64 days, 2 hours and 25 minutes setting a new world record for the fastest cycling across Eurasia. During the journey he also set a new world record for the fastest cycling across Europe from Cabo da Roca to Ufa in Russia in 25 days, 3 hours and 38 minutes.

In 2025, French ultra-distance cyclist Sofiane Sehili attempted to beat Deichmann's record, but he was stopped 200 km from the finish line and imprisoned by Russian authorities.

=== 2018: Alaska to Southern Argentina ===
From the 19 August 2018 to 24 November 2018 he cycled the 23112 km long Panamericana from Prudhoe Bay, Alaska to Ushuaia, Argentina in a new record time of 97 days. He completed his journey unsupported, without a team or support vehicle.

=== 2019: Norway to South Africa ===
From 8 September to 19 November he completed the approximately 18000 km long journey from North Cape in Norway to Cape Town in South Africa on his bicycle in a new record time of 72 days, 7 hours and 27 minutes. He was 30 days faster than the prior record holder.

In Egypt, Jonas was put in a prison cell in order to avoid a terrorist attack. In Ethiopia, he biked through an active conflict zone where people threw stones and sticks at him.

=== 2020: Triathlon around Germany ===
On 23 August 2020 he completed a triathlon around Germany, covering a distance of 16-times Ironman. He started in Lindau at Lake Constance and swam 60 km across the lake. He then cycled clockwise around Germany until the town of Zwiesel in Bavaria and then ran the final 675 km back to Lindau where he arrived after 31 days. The journey was a training and test for a triathlon around the world („Triathlon 360-degree") to which Deichmann started on 26 September 2020 in Munich.

=== 2020: Triathlon 360 – around the world ===
Jonas has completed a triathlon around the world covering a distance of 120 long-distance triathlons (approximately 456 km of swimming, 21600 km of cycling and 5064 km running).

During this journey, he gained international notoriety as the "German Forrest Gump". The book about his journey "Das Limit bin nur ich" is a bestseller. Prior to his triathlon around the world, he set multiple cycling records from Norway to South Africa, Alaska to Argentina, and across Eurasia.

==== Across the Alps to Karlobag, Croatia ====
He first cycled across the Alps to Karlobag in Croatia and then swam 456 km along the coast to Dubrovnik in 54 days. He completed the swim without a support boat and pulled a self designed raft with his supplies. He beat the prior record for the longest swim without a support by Sean Conway who had swum 200 km along the British coast.

==== Dubrovnik to Vladivostok ====
From Dubrovnik he cycled to Vladivostok on the Russian Pacific after his original route further South was closed due to the COVID-19 pandemic. In Siberia he faced temperatures below −30 °C and reached the Pacific in May.

==== North America ====
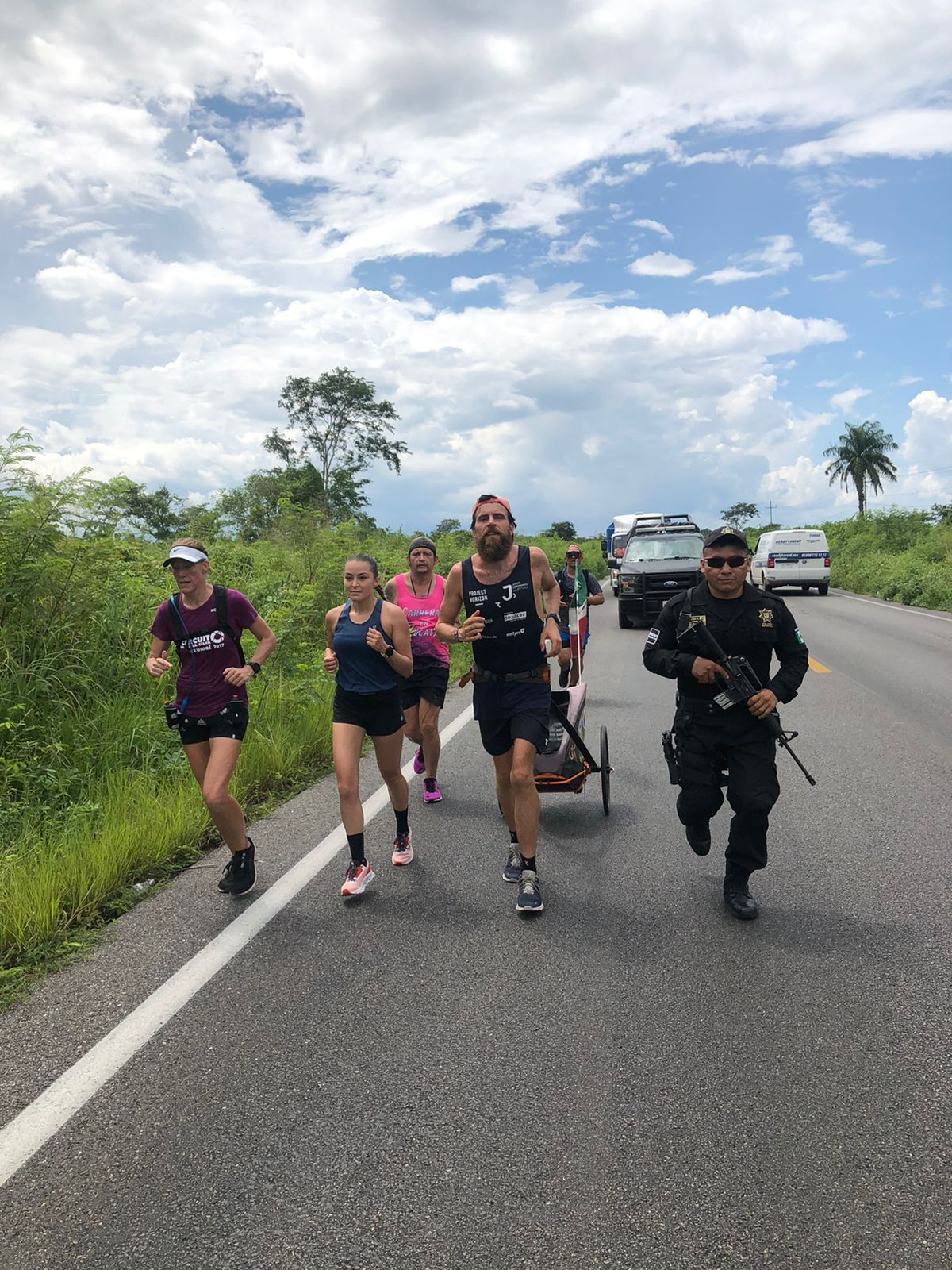
Deichmann in Mexico, during round-the-world triathlon

For the running section he changed plans again since the US and Canada had closed their borders. Instead he ran across Mexico from Tijuana in Baja California to Cancun in Quintana Roo. He completed the 5064 km long route in 117 days, covering more than one marathon a day.

During his running he became nationally known as the „German Forrest Gump" and was partly followed by police escort, media live coverage and people from Mexico who joined his run. From Cancun he flew to Lisbon in Portugal and cycled back to Munich.

After 429 days, he completed his around the world journey on 29 November 2021. The distance was approximately 120 long-distance triathlons. After the journey, he appeared in talk shows, published a book „Das Limit bin nur ich" (in German) and a documentary film with the same name.

=== 2023: Trans America Twice ===
In November 2023, he completed a double crossing of the US, calling it "Trans America Twice." He covered over 11,000 km, going from New York City to Los Angeles by bike, then returned from Los Angeles to New York City by foot. He completed his journey by running the New York City Marathon. A movie about this expedition has been made available on YouTube.

=== 2024: Challenge 120 ===
Jonas plans to complete 120 long-distance triathlons in 120 consecutive days, starting on 9 May 2024. It will be a daily routine of 3.8 km swimming, 180 km cycling, and 42 km running. By the end of the challenge, it will add up to 456 km of swimming, 21,000 km of biking, and 5,063 km of running. On 5 September 2024, he crossed the finish line, setting a new world record.

== Public speeches ==
Jonas has done a number of press tours, public appearances and motivational speeches. He has done interviews, conference talks, podcasts and TV appearances in various programs, including German primetime TV programs, e.g. Zervakis & Opdenhövel. Live.. He has done speeches at Porsche, BMW and other companies. Jonas is also a popular motivational speaker at Germany's largest companies and sports clubs, including Bayern Munich, Germany's national football team and many other Bundesliga and Champions League teams.

== Philanthropy ==
During his expeditions, Jonas has partnered with multiple charities. He has raised funds for Oxfam to draw attention to climate change as well as for World Bicycle Relief to donate bicycles in Africa. The first fundraising for World Bicycle Relief contributed towards 200,000 USD for 1,000 bikes to school children and community health volunteers in several African countries. Jonas has also spearheaded fundraising campaigns for German organizations, notably contributing to the German Youth Fire Brigade and the Laureus Sport for Good Award.

== Awards ==
- 21st Century Adventurer Award
- Alumni of the year 2023

== Filmography ==
- Das Limit bin nur ich by Ravir Film. A movie about Jonas Deichmann completing the world's longest triathlon. The movie premiered at DOK.fest München on 8 May 2022 and was subsequently released in German cinemas starting on 19 May. Das Limit bin nur ich won awards at several movie festivals around the world.
- Cape to Cape (2020). Cycled Media.
- Crossing America (2024). A 54-minute documentary about Jonas Deichmann's duathlon across the US and back.

== Bibliography ==
- Crossing America: Auf dem Rad von New York nach Los Angeles und zurück in 100 Ultramarathons (2023). Gräfe und Unzer Verlag. ISBN 9783846409909; ISBN 3846409901
- Der Schokoriegel Effekt – mit einfachen Mitteln große Ziele erreichen (2023). Gräfe und Unzer Verlag. ISBN 9783833888168
- Das Limit bin nur ich – Der Bildband (2022). Polyglott Verlag. ISBN 9783846409220
- Das Limit bin nur ich: Wie ich als erster Mensch die Welt im Triathlon umrundete (2021). Polyglott Verlag. ISBN 978-3-8464-0801-8
- Cape to Cape: In Rekordzeit mit dem Fahrrad vom Nordkap bis nach Südafrika (2020). Delius Klasing Verlag. ISBN 978-3-667-11967-4
