= Gianni Mura =

Italian sports journalist and writer (1945–2020)

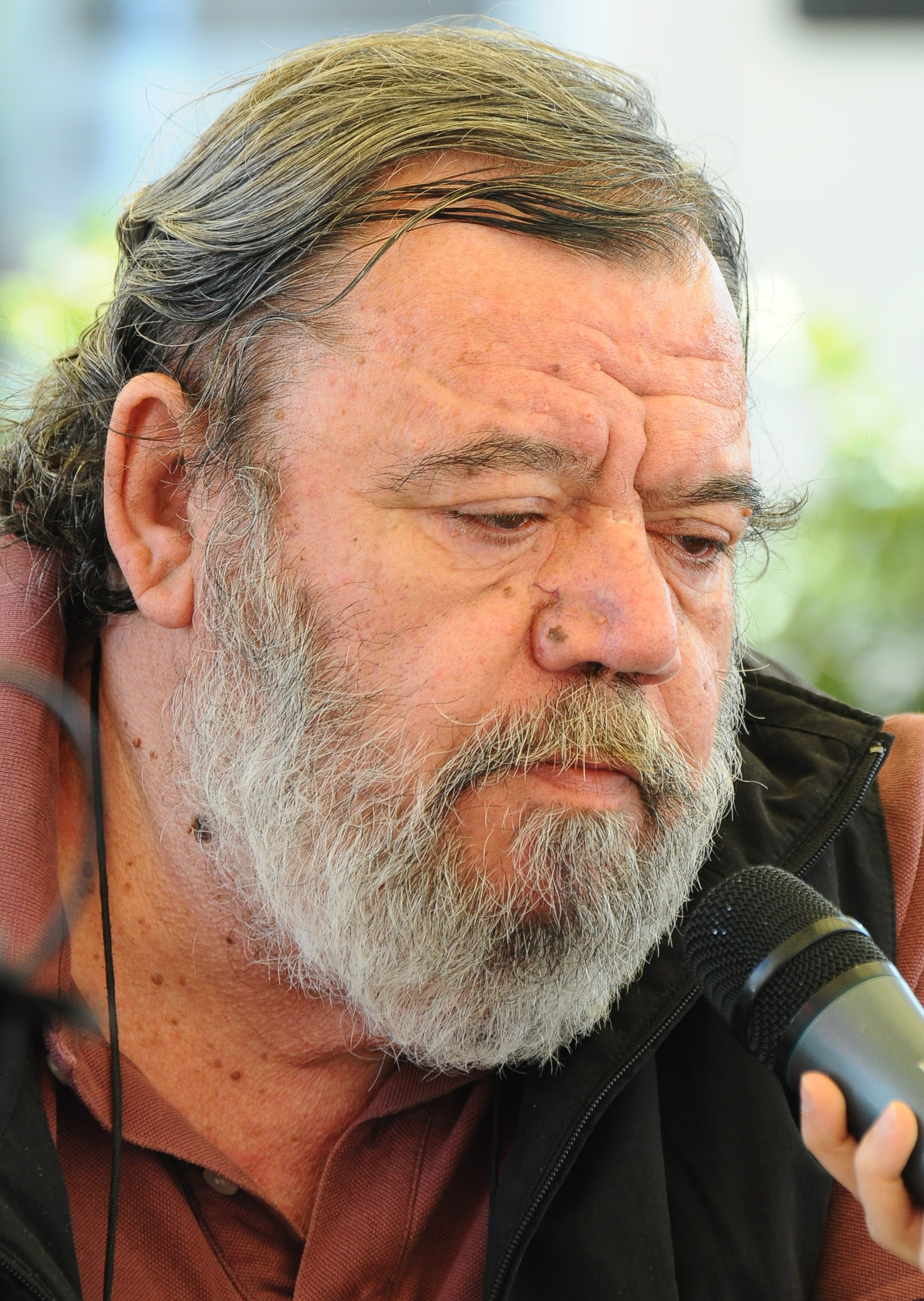
- Gianni Mura in 2010.
- Born: October 9, 1945; Milan, Italy
- Died: March 21, 2020 (aged 74); Senigallia, Italy
- Education: University of Milan
- Occupations: Journalist writer
- Years active: 1964–2020

Gianni Mura (9 October 1945 – 21 March 2020) was an Italian sports journalist and writer.

== Biography ==
In November 1964, he obtained an apprenticeship position in the daily sports newspaper, La Gazzetta dello Sport, and attended the University of Milan. This position was initially meant to be temporary, however he remained in the position for eight years. During his eight years at the Gazzetta he worked first as a correspondent for football matches of several different leagues and, starting in 1965, on the Giro d'Italia.

He was mostly known for his coverage of the Tour de France, which he began writing about in 1967, and continued to do so for many years after. He also wrote several books centered around the race. His first novel, Giallo su giallo (Yellow on Yellow), was released in May 2007 and was set during the Tour de France. The following year, he published a second book about the Tour, which was titled La fiamma rossa. Storie e strade dei miei tour (English: The Red Flame. Stories and Roads of my Tours).

In 1976, he collaborated with La Repubblica, with whom he followed the Montreal Olympics, and in 1983 became a permanent member of editorial staff. Throughout the Serie A football championship, he wrote a Sunday column called Sette giorni di cattivi pensieri ("Seven Days of Bad Thought"). For the weekly Il Venerdì, he wrote food and wine commentaries with his wife Paola.

He was also well known for doing all of his work on a typewriter, even long after they fell out of common use.

Hospitalized for an illness at the Senigallia hospital in March 2020, he died at 74 after suffering a heart attack.

== Publications ==
- Giallo su giallo, collana I Narratori, Feltrinelli, 2007.
- La fiamma rossa. Storie e strade dei miei tour, Minimum fax, 2008.
- Ischia, collana I Narratori, Feltrinelli, 2012.
- Tanti amori. Conversazioni con Marco Manzoni, Feltrinelli, 2013.
- Non gioco più, me ne vado, Il Saggiatore, 2013.
- Non c'è gusto, Minimum Fax, 2015.
- Confesso che ho stonato, Skira, 2017.
