= Rebecca Rusch =

American athlete

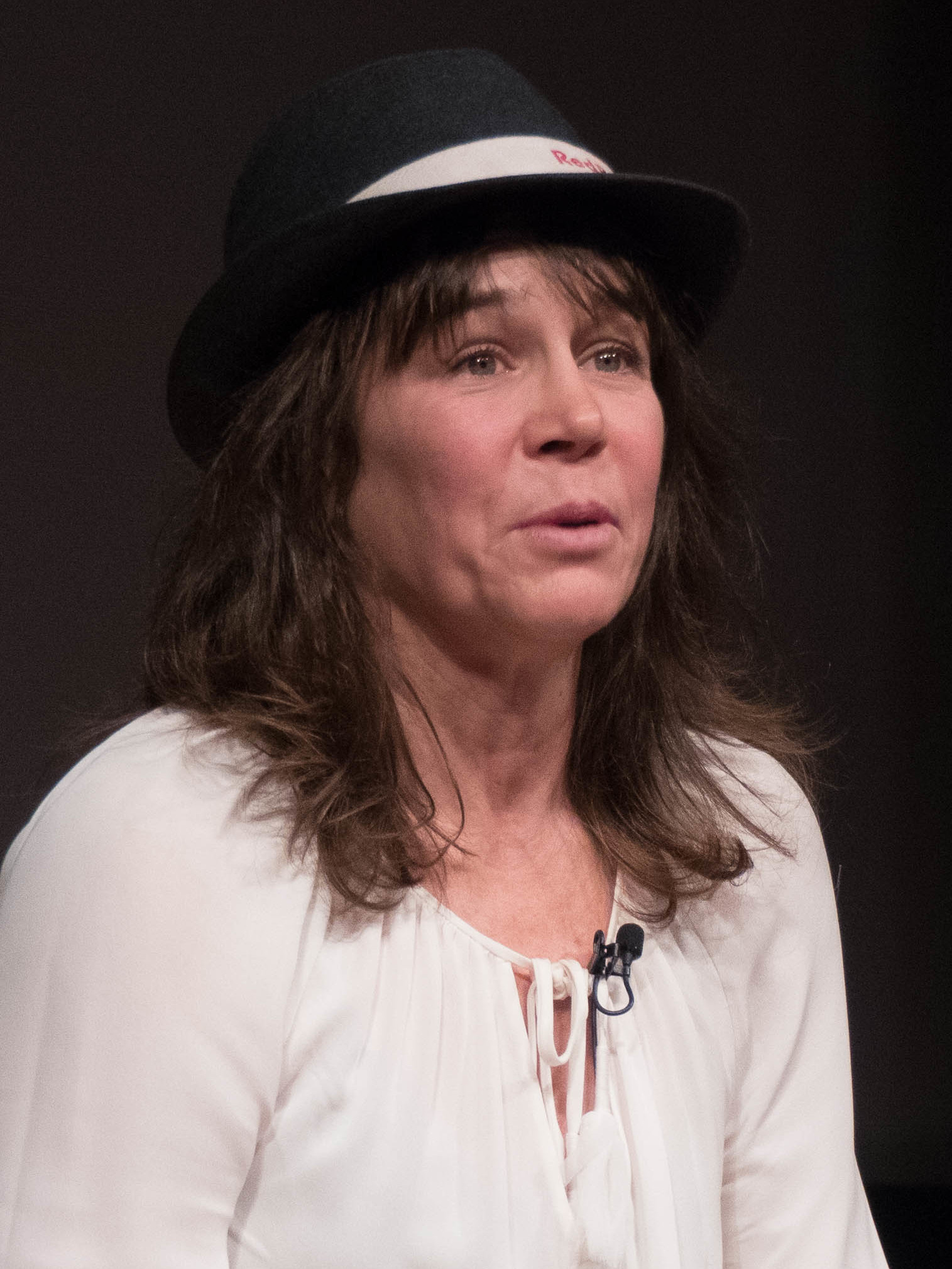
- Rusch in 2018

Personal information
- Born: August 25, 1968 (age 58) Aguadilla, Puerto Rico

Cycling career
- Sport: Cycling
- Role: Rider

Major wins
- World Masters XC Cycling Champion (2010); 3-Time 24 Hour Solo Mountain Bike World Champion (2007, 2008, 2009); Gravel Bike Racing World Champion (2015); Iditarod Trail Invitational 350, 1st Woman (2019, 2021)

Rebecca Rusch (born August 25, 1968) is an American endurance professional athlete, seven-time World Champion, author, entrepreneur, Emmy Award winner, and motivational speaker. Rusch's career has spanned adventure sports including rock climbing, adventure racing, whitewater rafting, cross-country skiing and mountain biking.

Rusch was nominated to the Mountain Bike Hall of Fame in 2019 as well as the inaugural class of the Gravel Cycling Hall of Fame in 2022, and owns seven World Championship titles in multiple sport disciplines. Rusch was a member of the US National Whitewater Rafting Team as well as several international adventure racing teams, participating in the Eco Challenge (1997–2002), Primal Quest (2002–2006) and Raid Gauloises (2000, 2002, 2003) series. Since 2013, she has hosted a gravel bike race in Idaho to raise money for charity.

== Personal life ==
Rusch was born August 25, 1968, in Aguadilla, Puerto Rico to Stephen Rusch and Judy Tomlinson Rusch. Her father, a US Air Force F-4 pilot, was shot down during combat in the Vietnam War in 1972 when Rusch was 3 years old. She has an older sister, USAF Major Gen. Sharon Bannister. Rusch attended college at the University of Illinois at Urbana-Champaign where she studied business marketing.

In September 2014, Rusch married Greg Martin, an engineer firefighter for the Ketchum fire department and accomplished mountain biker and outdoorsman. They live in Ketchum, Idaho.

== Career ==
=== Event production and activism ===
Rated a Top 5 gravel event by Global Cycling Network and one of the 25 Best Bike Rides in the World by Outside Magazine, Rebecca's Private Idaho has been staged every Labor Day weekend since 2013 in Rusch's hometown and surrounding Idaho backcountry. Conceived and reconned by Rusch, produced in partnership with her sponsors, the gravel grinder, stage race and outdoor festival benefits local, national and global charities: the [Wood River Trails Coalition; the Idaho chapter of the National Interscholastic Cycling Association; People for Bikes and World Bicycle Relief. RPI, along with other cycling clinics, camps and guided tours coordinated and led by Rusch (including Rusch Academy and MTB Lao), plus adventures like mountain biking up and down Mount Kilimanjaro have raised over $500k to date in support of select nonprofits.

Rusch established the Be Good Foundation, a 501(c)3 nonprofit, in honor of her father Capt. Stephen A. Rusch, who signed his letters home from Vietnam using those two words. Its mission is to enrich communities by using the bicycle as a catalyst for healing, empowerment and evolution and to create opportunities for outdoor exploration, personal discovery and humanitarian service. Priorities include removal of UXO, or unexploded ordnance, throughout Laos; protecting public lands for recreation and access; and partnering with other cycling-related nonprofits to fund impactful change. Rusch has partnered with Mines Advisory Group (MAG) and jewelry company Article22 to support UXO mitigation efforts.

=== Author: Rusch to Glory ===
Rusch to Glory: Adventure, Risk & Triumph on the Path Less Traveled, published August 2014 by VeloPress and written by Rusch with Selene Yeager, chronicles her journey from rookie suburban high school cross-country runner to World Champion endurance athlete, and all the adventures in between. Set in the exotic locales and extreme conditions that forged an extraordinary athlete from ordinary roots—trekking through Borneo, mountain climbing in Patagonia, navigating the rivers of Vietnam, racing bikes across the Andes—Rusch's rambling led to a successful career in ultra adventure racing, but when the TV cameras dropped out and sponsorship dollars followed, Rusch's story carried on. "At age 38, Rusch faced a tough decision: retire or reinvent herself yet again. Determined to go for broke, she shifted her focus to endurance mountain bike racing and rode straight into the record books at a moment when most athletes walk away. Rusch to Glory is more than an epic story of adventure; it is a testament to the rewards of hard work, determination, and resilience on the long road to personal and professional triumph."

=== Public speaking and media ===
Rusch is a frequent public speaker on issues of sport. In 2016, Rusch spoke at a TEDxSunValley event on November 30, 2016. "Navigating Home", her 17-minute address, can be viewed on Rusch's YouTube channel. On May 27, 2019, Rusch and her sister Brig. Gen. Sharon Bannister were invited to be co-keynote speakers in Washington D.C. by the Vietnam Veterans Memorial Fund, dedicated to remembering those who served in the USA armed forces in Vietnam and to maintaining the Vietnam Veterans Memorial. Rusch counted it as "the most important speech of our lives, sharing our parallel stories of finding Dad and keeping his memory and impact alive. Through the loss of one family member, we have gained thousands of new family members who have also been touched by loss."

Outside TV has broadcast a three-part documentary miniseries following Rusch and fellow explorer Steve "Doom" Fassbinder over 6 days of mountain biking, rock climbing, canyoneering and packrafting in Utah's Bears Ears and Grand Staircase Escalante National Monuments with the intent to promote preservation of public lands. Outside TV also captured the Iditarod Trail Invitational as Rusch, in her first attempt at the race, completed 350 miles as the first female finisher in a self-supported wilderness bikepacking venture through the Alaskan wilderness in subzero temperatures.

These efforts and more are discussed in a Rich Roll podcast. An ultra athlete and author, Roll says, "Rebecca's accomplishments are beyond impressive. But our conversation lives beyond elite performance to explore things like curiosity. The richness of adventure. Feeding the soul. Continuous personal growth. Redefining age. Contributing to the greater good. And giving back. Most of all, this is about what can be gleaned by leaning into the unknown. And living outside the comfort zone. My hope is that it leaves [listeners] re-evaluating personal limits. And inspired to live more adventurously."

=== Emmy Award winner: Blood Road ===
In 2015, Rusch with Huyen Nguyen became the first persons to pedal the entire length of the 1,800 km (1,200 mi) Ho Chi Minh trail through Vietnam, Laos and Cambodia. Blood Road, according to director Nicholas Schrunk, "set out to document an epic cycling expedition as well as Rebecca's personal journey to visit the crash site [of her father], but we ended up uncovering something much deeper. It's a story about the scars, both physical and emotional, that war leaves on families, countries, and cultures, and how they still exist today." Blood Road earned the "Feature Film Award" at the Wasatch Mountain Film Festival. The film earned "Best of the Festival" and audience favorite awards at the Banff Mountain Film Festival, Bentonville Film Festival, Breck Film Fest and Sun Valley Film Festival, where it premiered in 2017. Nominated for one Sports Emmy Award and two News & Documentary Emmy Awards, it won the latter for Outstanding Graphic Design & Art Direction in 2017.

== Professional accolades and awards ==
- Elected to inaugural class of Gravel Cycling Hall Of Fame (2022)
- Elected to Mountain Bike Hall Of Fame (2019)
- Outside Magazine Top 40 Women Who've Made the Biggest Impact (2017)
- Men's Journal 25 Most Adventurous Women in the Past 25 Years (2017)
- Trailblazer MVP Award, Women's Sports Museum (2017)
- Active.com
- #19 of 50 World's Best Athletes (2015)
- Active.com No. 32 of 50 World's Best Athletes (2013)
- Mountain Biker of the Year, Endurance LIVE Awards (2010)
- Sports Illustrated Adventure Racing Team of the Year (2003)
- Outside Magazine Top 20 Female Athletes of the Year (2003)
- Adventure Sport Magazine "Queen of Pain" (2004)

=== Individual cycling races ===
- Iditarod Trail Invitational 350, 1st Woman (2019, 2021)
- Iditarod Trail Invitational 350, 1st Self Supported (2021)
- Dirty Kanza XL 350, 1st Woman (2018) (event renamed in 2020 to Unbound Gravel)
- Dirty Kanza 100, 1st Woman (2017), 1st Overall (2016)
- Smoke'N'Fire 400, Women's record holder (2015)
- Jay P's Backyard Fat Pursuit 200k, 1st Woman (2015)
- Trans Andes Challenge MTB Stage Race 300k, 1st Woman (2014)
- Dirty Kanza 200, 1st Woman (2012, 2013, 2014)
- Leadville 100, Winner and women's record holder (2009, 2010, 2011, 2012)
- 24 Hours of Moab, solo MTB race, 2nd (2007)
- Mountain X-Games Adventure Race, 1st Women's team (2007)
- 24 Hours of Moab, 1st Women's team (2005)

=== State and national championships ===
- XC Single-Speed National Champion (2011, 2013)
- USAC National Singlespeed Champion: Sun Valley (2011)
- 24 Hour Team MTB National Champion (2008, 2009, 2011)
- Idaho Cyclocross State Champion (2009)
- Idaho Short Track State Champion (2008, 2009)
- USA Cycling Ultra Endurance Series Winner (2006, 2007, 2009)
- USA National Marathon Championships, 4th (2008)
- 24 Hour Solo Mountain Bike National Championships, 2nd (2007)
- 24 Hour Solo MTB National Champion (2006)
- 24 Hour Orienteering National Champion (2006)
- US Whitewater Rafting National Champion Team (2001, 2002)

=== World races and championships ===
- Gravel Bike Racing World Champion (2015)
- World Masters XC Cycling Champion (2010)
- 3-Time 24 Hour Solo Mountain Bike World Champion (2007, 2008, 2009)
- Masters Cross Country Skiing World Champion (2008)
- Primal Quest Expedition Races (2002–2006)
- Eco Challenge Adventure Races (1997–2002)
- Raid Gauloises Expedition Races (2000, 2002, 2003)
- Raid Gauloises Adventure Racing World Championships, 1st (2003)
