= Simon Rose (journalist) =

English writer (born 1957)

Simon Rose (born 14 October 1957) is an English journalist. He was a BBC Radio researcher for BBC Light Entertainment programmes including Weekending, The News Quiz, News Huddlines and Not the Nine O' Clock News. He also worked as a financial journalist for the BBC and others. He later became a film journalist reviewing for the Daily Mirror for four years.

After three years as spokesman for the pressure group Save Our Savers, he became a presenter on the national business radio station Share Radio.

He developed and shared screenwriting and executive producer credits for The Flying Scotsman, a small British film which opened the 60th International Edinburgh Film Festival 2006 and received 5 Scottish BAFTA nominations.

He has written 14 books including Complete and Utter Zebu with Steve Caplin, which examines the deceptions and corruptions that the media, politicians, and corporations apply to everyone's daily life.

A secular Jew with three children, he lives in Southfields and has contributed to many publications.
