= Michael B. Clifford =

Director and filmmaker

Michael Baig-Clifford is a BAFTA-award-winning filmmaker.
