= Didi Senft =

German cycling fan

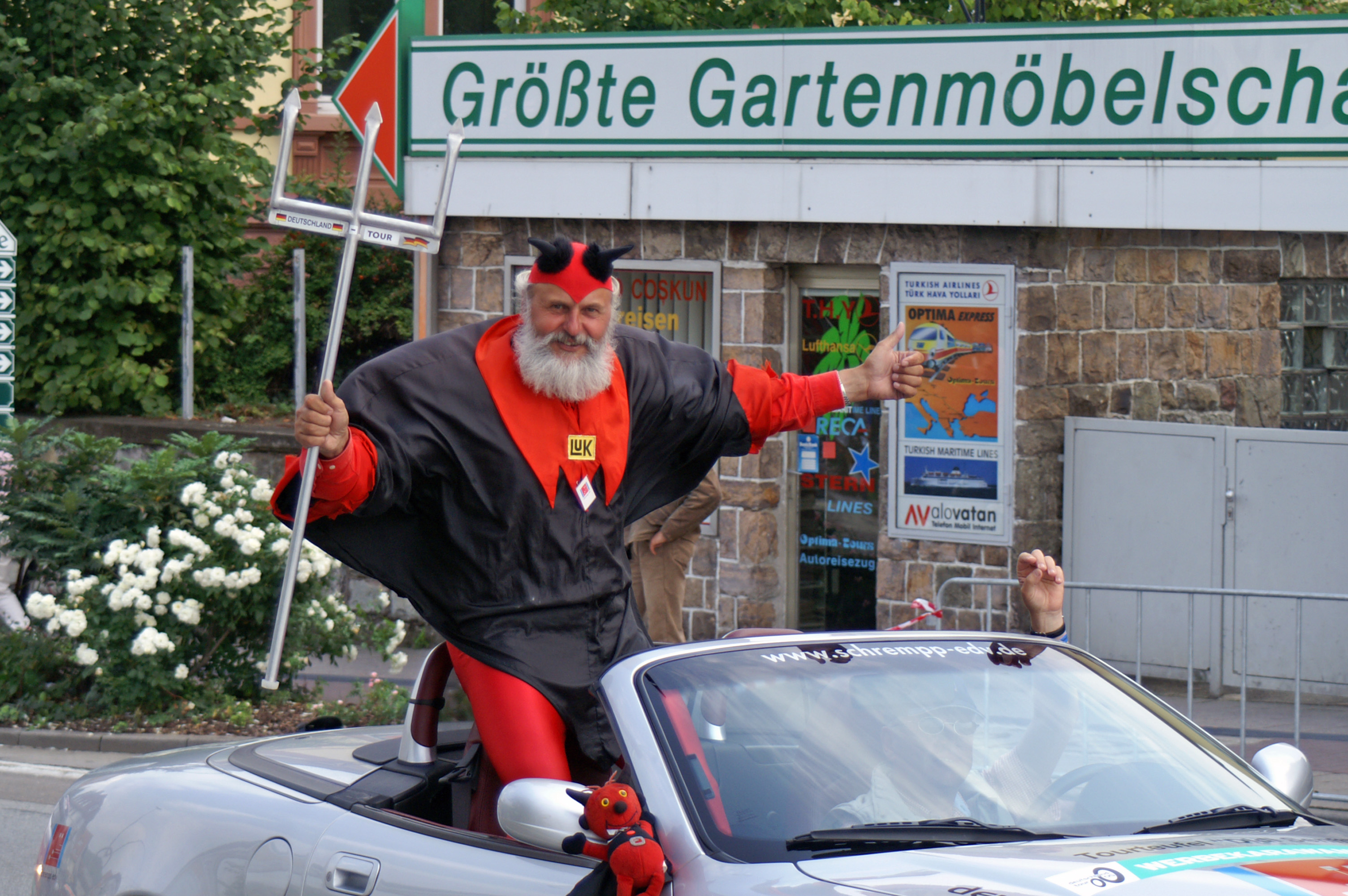
- Senft, as the Red Devil; 2005 Tour of Germany
- Born: Dieter Senft; 7 February 1952 (age 74); Reichenwalde, East Germany
- Other names: Didi the Devil; El Diablo

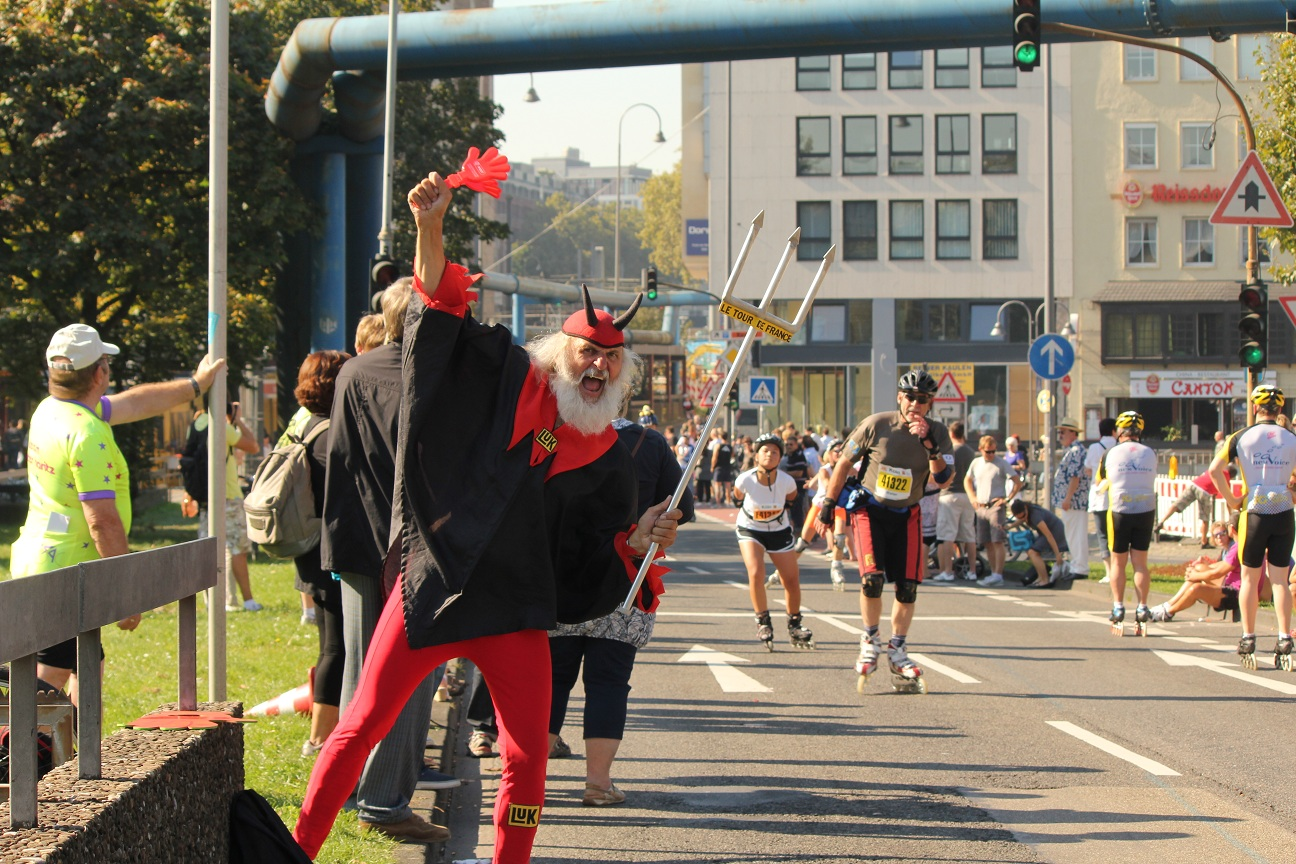
The Red Devil at Cologne Marathon 2011

Dieter "Didi" Senft (born 7 February 1952) is a German cycling fan who is known as Didi the Devil or El Diablo at the Tour de France and Giro d'Italia. Since 1993, he has been seen in the Tour and Giro's many stages wearing his red devil costume and painting trident symbols on the road some miles before he appears. Senft said the inspiration for his costume came from secretly watching the Tour de France on West German TV and hearing a broadcaster refer to the red triangular flag that marks the last kilometer (flamme rouge) as "the devil's red flag."

== Biography ==
Senft is an inventor who has created numerous unusual bicycles including the largest rideable bicycle in the world. He has 17 world records from bike-related inventions. According to the Guinness Book of Records, Senft built the largest mobile guitar, taking the form of a bicycle.

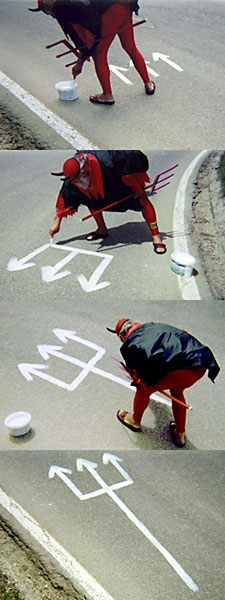
Didi Senft painting a trident at the Giro d'Italia

During multi-day stage races he often travels ahead of the race itself in a custom-decorated camper vehicle, picking various locations for the race to pass by. He is also a regular attendee at important single day races, such as the spring classics and world championships.

In 1996, Senft travelled to Atlanta, Georgia, USA, to cheer on the athletes during the 1996 Summer Olympic Games cycling road race on the streets of suburban Buckhead.

During the 2006 Tour of Switzerland, Didi Senft painted his signature trident on the road before the competitors were set to go by. However, the local Swiss police told him it was illegal and asked him to remove the marks in order to avoid facing a fine.

He was again in the spotlight at Euro 2008 when he rode through Klagenfurt in his specially created "Football Bike" prior to the Germany vs Croatia Match.

He was seen at the 2011 and 2012 Giro d'Italia and the 2011 Cologne Marathon in a pink devil costume.

In 2012, Senft confirmed he would miss the Tour de France for the first time since 1993 after undergoing surgery. "I just got back from having my head x-rayed, the third time in three weeks, I feel like a Chernobyl reactor," he told Cyclingnews.com. "Today the results were much better and I can start doing more things every day." Following his enforced absence from events, Senft was present at the 2012 World Championships, and has been at the Tour de France in each edition since, as of 2026.
