= National Interscholastic Cycling Association =

American cycling organization

- Sport: Cycling
- Category: Interscholastic Mountain Biking
- Jurisdiction: National
- Abbreviation: NICA
- Founded: 2009
- Regional affiliation: United States
- Headquarters: Orinda, California
- President: Amanda Carey
- Chairperson: Bob Burns

Official website
- www.nationalmtb.org

The National Interscholastic Cycling Association (NICA) is an American non-profit organization that promotes youth mountain biking programs in the United States. NICA provides governance, leadership, and program support to regional interscholastic mountain biking organizations. NICA's mission is to build "strong minds, bodies, character, and communities through cycling, where every youth is empowered to be part of a thriving and engaged cycling community."

== History ==
=== Foundation (1998–2008) ===
In 1998, Matt Fritzinger wanted to start a road biking team at Berkeley High School. On his first practice, 4 kids showed up but they were all riding mountain bikes. Because of this, Matt decided that they would become a mountain bike team, becoming one of the first High School Mountain Bike teams in the country (Payson High School, in Utah, created an official team in 1996, led by John Meredith). In 2001, Matt would create the first league, Norcal, who hosted the first high school mountain biking races. Some of the early schools to join include, Casa Grande High School (2001), Nevada Union High School (2001), Salinas High School (2001), and Drake High School (2002). In 2003, Matt Fritzinger stopped coaching the Berkeley team to focus on building the NorCal League, letting the future executive director of NICA, Austin Mclnerny, take over. Over the next 6 years, the Norcal league would continue to grow, eventually leading to the creation of the Second League, SoCal. With the increasing size of the league, it was decided that a management organization of the leagues must be established.

=== Explanation (2009–2016) ===
The formation of NICA was announced in 2009 by Matt Fritzinger, modeling after the successful regional executions of NorCal and SoCal.

== Leagues ==
There are 34 leagues across the United States, in 31 states: Alabama, Arizona, Arkansas, Northern California, southern California, Delaware, Florida, Idaho, Illinois, Indiana, Kansas, Kentucky, Maryland, Mississippi, Missouri, Montana, Nebraska, New Mexico, Southern Nevada, Northern Nevada, New Jersey, New York, North Carolina, Ohio, Oregon, Pennsylvania, South Carolina, Tennessee, Texas, Utah, Virginia, West Virginia, and Wisconsin.

== Races ==
Most NICA leagues have 4 to 5 races per season in either fall or spring depending on local climate. The results of the top eight riders in each team are combined into the team's full score. In some states, teams are split into divisions; division 1 and division 2 based on the size of the school, with larger teams in division 1. For division two teams, only the top four racers’ points are counted. There must be at least one girl and one boy for each 4 racers. The scores are cumulative between races and the top teams move forwards into the championships.
