= Lance Armstrong =

American cyclist (born 1971)

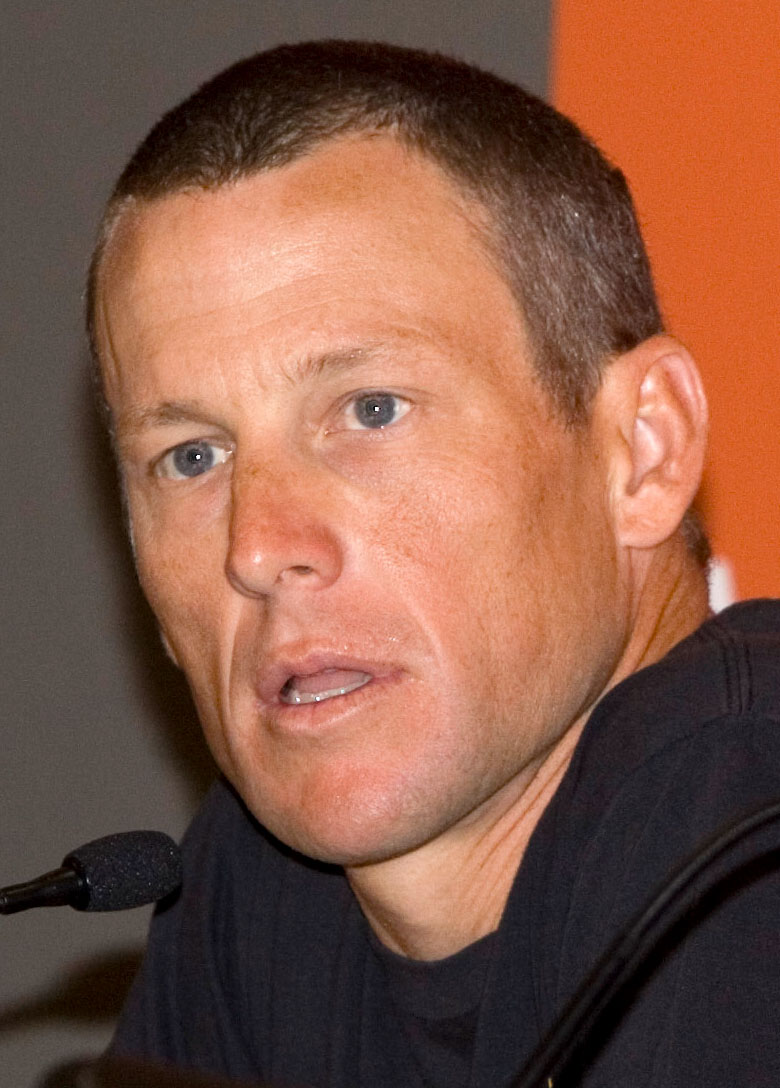
- Armstrong before the 2009 Tour Down Under

Personal information
- Full name: Lance Edward Armstrong
- Nicknames: Le Boss; Big Tex
- Born: Lance Edward Gunderson; September 18, 1971 (age 55) Richardson, Texas, U.S.
- Height: 1.77 m (5 ft 9 1/2 in)
- Weight: 75 kg (165 lb)

Cycling career
- Sport: Cycling
- Discipline: Road
- Role: Rider
- Rider type: All-rounder

Amateur teams
- 1990–1991: Subaru–Montgomery
- 1991: US National Team

Professional teams
- 1992–1996: Motorola
- 1997: Cofidis
- 1998–2005: U.S. Postal Service
- 2009: Astana
- 2010–2011: Team RadioShack

Major wins
- Grand Tour Tour de France 2 individual stages (1993, 1995) Stage races Tour de Luxembourg (1998) Tour DuPont (1995, 1996) One-day races and Classics World Road Race Championships (1993) National Road Race Championships (1993) Clásica de San Sebastián (1995) La Flèche Wallonne (1996) Trofeo Laigueglia (1993)
Medal record
Representing United States
Men's Cycling
World Championships
Gold medal – first place	1993 Oslo	Elite Men's Road Race
Olympic Games
Disqualified	2000 Sydney	Men's time trial

Lance Edward Armstrong (né Gunderson; born September 18, 1971) is an American former professional road racing cyclist. He achieved international fame for winning the Tour de France a record seven consecutive times from 1999 to 2005, but was stripped of his titles in 2012 after an investigation into doping allegations found that Armstrong used performance-enhancing drugs over his career. Armstrong has been banned for life from all sanctioned bicycling events since 2012, though he retired from professional cycling in 2011.

At age 16, Armstrong began competing as a triathlete and was a national sprint-course triathlon champion in 1989 and 1990. In 1992, he began his career as a professional cyclist with the Motorola team. Armstrong had success between 1993 and 1996 with the World Championship in 1993, the Clásica de San Sebastián in 1995, Tour DuPont in 1995 and 1996, and a handful of stage victories in Europe, including stage 8 of the 1993 Tour de France and stage 18 of the 1995 Tour de France. In 1996, he was diagnosed with a potentially fatal metastatic testicular cancer. After recovering, Armstrong founded the Lance Armstrong Foundation (now the Livestrong Foundation) to assist other cancer survivors.

Returning to cycling in 1998, Armstrong was a member of the US Postal/Discovery team between 1998 and 2005 when he won his seven Tour de France titles. Armstrong retired from racing at the end of the 2005 Tour de France, but returned to competitive cycling with the Astana team in January 2009, finishing third in the 2009 Tour de France later that year. Between 2010 and 2011, he raced with Team Radio Shack and retired for a second time in 2011.

Armstrong began to be accused of doping after winning the 1999 Tour de France, allegations that he denied for more than a decade. In 2012, a United States Anti-Doping Agency (USADA) investigation concluded that Armstrong had used performance-enhancing drugs over the course of his career and called him the ringleader of "the most sophisticated, professionalized and successful doping program that sport has ever seen". Armstrong professed his innocence but chose not to contest the charges, citing the potential toll on his family. He received a lifetime ban from all sports that follow the World Anti-Doping Code, ending Armstrong's competitive cycling career. The International Cycling Union (UCI) upheld USADA's decision and decided that his stripped wins would not be allocated to other riders. (Note: Other top riders in the 1999 to 2005 Tours also have been involved in doping scandals. Several riders were banned and some also had their results stripped; some subsequently admitted to doping. Those riders include Jan Ullrich, Marco Pantani, Andreas Klöden, Joseba Beloki, Raimondas Rumšas, Alex Zülle, Ivan Basso, and Alexander Vinokourov. UCI stated that "a cloud of suspicion would remain hanging over that period." And so, while noting that their decision "might appear harsh for those who rode clean", UCI decided "with respect to Lance Armstrong" that those seven Tours would have no official winner, rather than being allocated to other riders.) In January 2013, Armstrong publicly admitted his involvement in doping. In April 2018, Armstrong settled a civil lawsuit with the United States Department of Justice and agreed to pay US$5 million to the U.S. government after whistleblower proceedings were commenced by Floyd Landis, a former team member.

== Early life ==
Armstrong was born Lance Edward Gunderson on September 18, 1971, at Methodist Hospital in Richardson, Texas. His mother, Linda Armstrong Kelly (née: Gayle Mooneyham), grew up in Oak Cliff. Armstrong was named after Lance Rentzel, a Dallas Cowboys wide receiver. His parents divorced in 1973 when Lance was two, and when his mother remarried Terry Keith Armstrong, Lance took his stepfather's surname. He attended Plano East Senior High School.

== Career ==
=== Early career ===
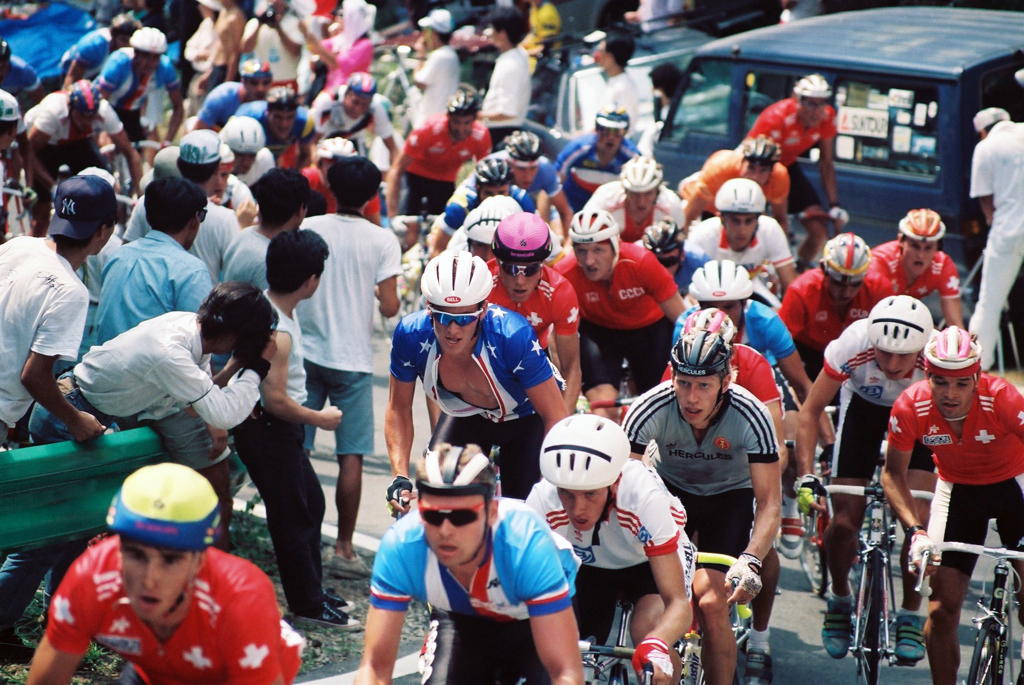
Armstrong (center left) during the amateur race at the 1990 UCI Road World Championships

In the 1987–1988 Tri-Fed/Texas ("Tri-Fed" was the former name of USA Triathlon), Armstrong was ranked the number-one triathlete in the 19-and-under group; second place was Chann McRae, who became a US Postal Service cycling teammate and the 2002 USPRO national champion. Armstrong's total points in 1987 as an amateur were better than those of five professionals ranked higher than he was that year. At 16, Lance Armstrong became a professional triathlete and became national sprint-course triathlon champion in 1989 and 1990 at 18 and 19, respectively.

=== Motorola: 1992–96 ===
In 1992, Armstrong turned professional with the Motorola Cycling Team, the successor of 7-Eleven team. In 1993, he won 10 one-day events and stage races, but his breakthrough victory was the World Road Race Championship held in Norway. Before his World Championships win, Armstrong took his first win at the Tour de France, in the stage from Châlons-sur-Marne to Verdun. He was 97th in the general classification when he retired after stage 12. Armstrong collected the Thrift Drug Triple Crown of Cycling: the Thrift Drug Classic in Pittsburgh, the K-Mart West Virginia Classic, and the CoreStates USPRO national championship in Philadelphia. He is alleged by another cyclist competing in the CoreStates Road Race to have bribed that cyclist so that he would not compete with Armstrong for the win.

In 1994, Armstrong again won the Thrift Drug Classic and came second in the Tour DuPont in the United States. His successes in Europe occurred when he placed second in Liège–Bastogne–Liège and the Clásica de San Sebastián, where just two years before, Armstrong had finished in last place at his first all-pro event in Europe. He finished the year strongly at the World Championships in Agrigento, finishing in seventh place less than a minute behind winner Luc Leblanc.

In a 2016 speech to University of Colorado, Boulder professor Roger A. Pielke Jr.'s Introduction to Sports Governance class, Armstrong stated that he began doping in "late spring of 1995".

Armstrong won the Clásica de San Sebastián in 1995, followed by an overall victory in the penultimate Tour DuPont and a handful of stage victories in Europe, including the stage to Limoges in the Tour de France, three days after the death of his teammate Fabio Casartelli, who crashed on the descent of the Col de Portet d'Aspet on the 15th stage. After winning the stage, Armstrong pointed to the sky in honor of Casartelli.

Armstrong's successes were much the same in 1996. He became the first American to win La Flèche Wallonne and again won the Tour DuPont. However, Armstrong was able to compete for only five days in the Tour de France. In the 1996 Olympic Games, he finished sixth in the time trial and twelfth in the road race. In August 1996, following the Leeds Classic, Armstrong signed a two-year, $2 million deal with the French Cofidis Cycling Team. Joining him in signing contracts with the French team were teammates Frankie Andreu and Laurent Madouas. Two months later, Armstrong was diagnosed with advanced testicular cancer.

=== Cancer diagnosis, treatment, and recovery ===
On October 2, 1996, at the age of 25, Armstrong was diagnosed with stage three (advanced) testicular cancer (embryonal carcinoma). The cancer had spread to his lymph nodes, lungs, brain, and abdomen. Armstrong visited urologist Jim Reeves in Austin, Texas, for diagnosis of his symptoms, including a headache, blurred vision, coughing up blood, and a swollen testicle. The next day, Armstrong had an orchiectomy to remove the diseased testicle. When Reeves was asked in a later interview what he thought Armstrong's chances of survival were, Reeves said, "Almost none. We told Lance initially 20 to 50% chance, mainly to give him hope. But with the kind of cancer he had, with the X-rays, the blood tests, almost no hope."

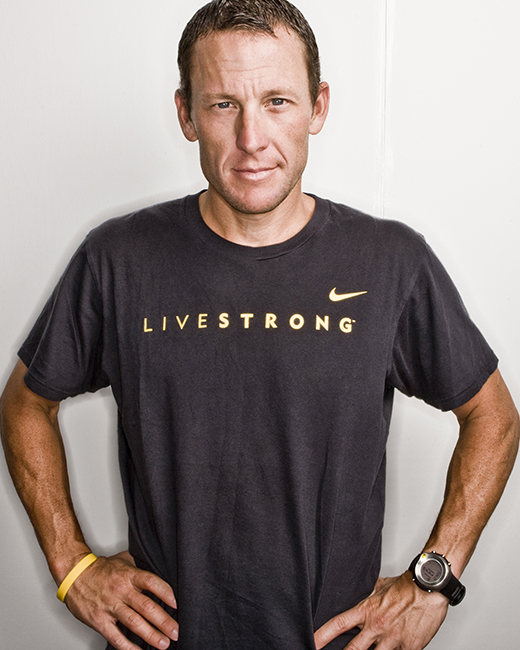
Lance Armstrong in 2008

After receiving a letter from Steven Wolff, an oncologist at Vanderbilt University, Armstrong went to the Indiana University medical center in Indianapolis and decided to receive the rest of his treatment there. The standard treatment for Armstrong's cancer was a "cocktail" of the drugs bleomycin, etoposide, and cisplatin (or Platinol) (BEP). The first chemotherapy cycle that Armstrong underwent included BEP, but for the three remaining cycles, he was given an alternative, vinblastine etoposide, ifosfamide, and cisplatin (VIP), to avoid lung toxicity associated with bleomycin. Armstrong credited this with saving his cycling career. At Indiana University, Lawrence Einhorn had pioneered the use of cisplatin to treat testicular cancer. Armstrong's primary oncologist there was Craig Nichols. On October 25, his brain lesions, which were found to contain extensive necrosis, were surgically removed by Scott A. Shapiro, a professor of neurosurgery at Indiana University.

Armstrong's final chemotherapy treatment took place on December 13, 1996. In January 1997, Armstrong unexpectedly appeared at the first training camp of the Cofidis team at Lille, France, riding 100 km (62 mi) with his new teammates before returning to the United States. In February 1997, he was declared cancer-free. In October, Cofidis announced that his contract would not be extended, after negotiations broke down over a new deal. A former boss at Subaru Montgomery offered him a contract with the US Postal team at a salary of $200,000 a year. By January 1998, Armstrong was engaged in serious training for racing, moving to Europe with the team.

=== US Postal/Discovery: 1998–2005 ===
Before his cancer treatment, Armstrong had participated in four Tour de France races, winning two stages. In 1993, he won the eighth stage and in 1995; he took stage 18 which he dedicated to teammate Fabio Casartelli who had crashed and died on stage 15. Armstrong dropped out of the 1996 Tour after the fifth stage after becoming ill, a few months before his cancer diagnosis.

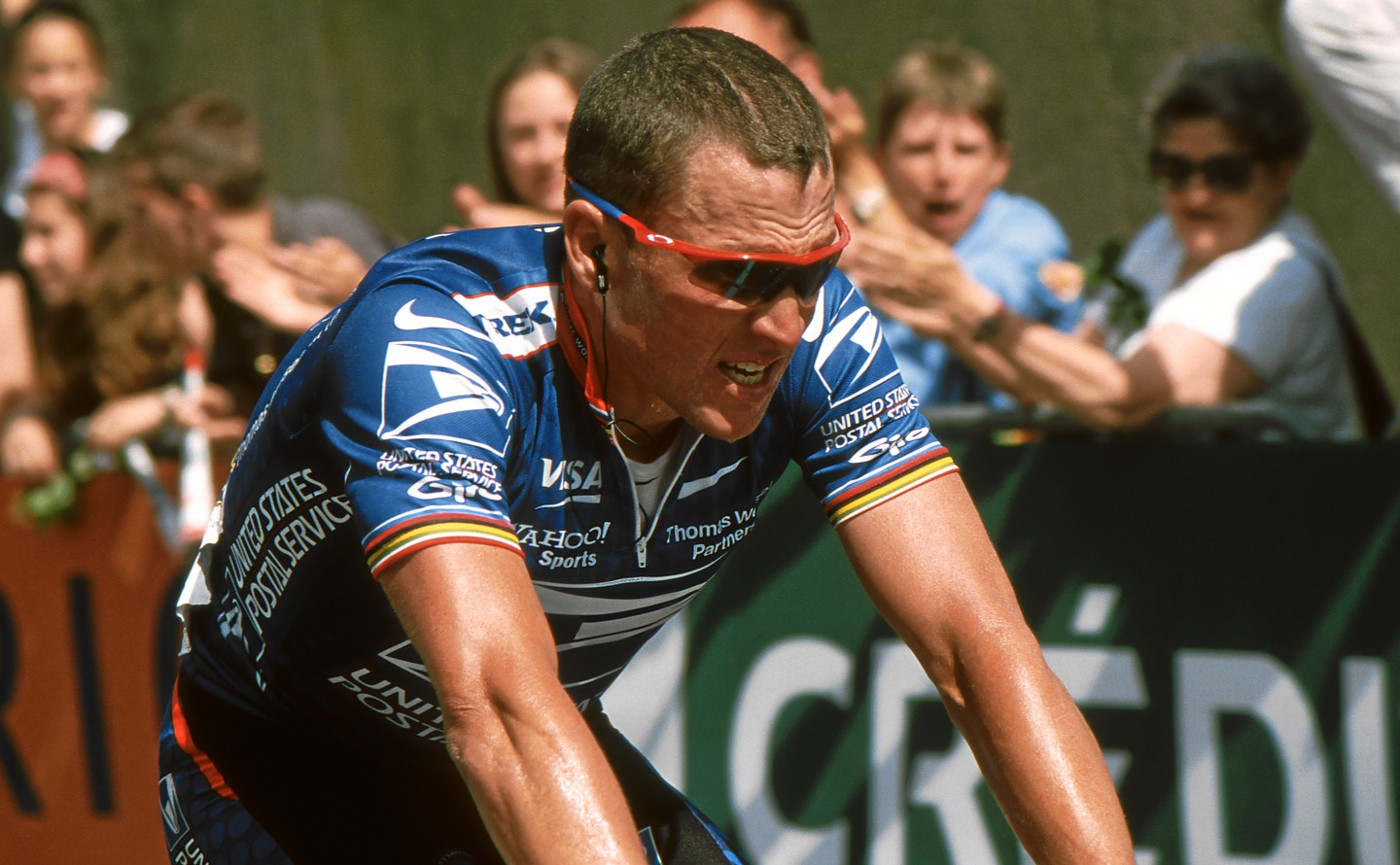
Armstrong finishing third in Sète, taking over the yellow jersey at Grand Prix Midi Libre

Armstrong's cycling comeback began in 1998. He entered the 1998 edition of Paris–Nice but could not compete at elite level and abandoned the race. Armstrong and his fiancée then left Europe and returned to Texas where he contemplated retirement. Not long after returning to the United States, Armstrong entered seclusion near Beech Mountain and Boone, North Carolina with former Tour de France rider Bob Roll as well as Chris Carmichael and trained in the Appalachian Mountains. In May 1998, Armstrong held his second charity race for cancer research in Austin, Texas: The Race for the Roses. Greg LeMond, Irish cycling legend Sean Kelly, and five time Tour champion Miguel Induráin were the most important cyclists at the event. LeMond said it was a good reason to get cyclists together, that life does not always deal the cards out equally, that no one could know if Armstrong would get back to the highest level, and that Armstrong might conceivably retire the following year. During an interview, Armstrong said the rider he admired most was Laurent Jalabert, saying that when he was riding well, he was the fiercest competitor in the bunch.

Armstrong then entered and won the Tour of Luxembourg. During the 1998 Vuelta a España Armstrong shocked the cycling world by finishing in the top five during one ITT, the top 10 in another and for the most part staying with the GC contenders in the mountains en route to finishing fourth overall. His credibility as a threat was confirmed when he finished fourth in both the road race and time trial at the World Championships. As a result of these efforts, Armstrong finished third in the voting for the Vélo d'Or. In 1999, he won the Tour de France, including four stages. Armstrong beat the second place rider, Alex Zülle, by 7 minutes 37 seconds. However, the absence of Jan Ullrich (injury) and Marco Pantani (drug allegations) meant Armstrong had not yet proven himself against the biggest names in the sport. Stage wins included the prologue, stage eight, an individual time trial in Metz, an Alpine stage on stage nine, and the second individual time trial on stage 19.

In 2000, Ullrich and Pantani returned to challenge Armstrong. The race began a six-year rivalry between Ullrich and Armstrong and ended in victory for Armstrong by 6 minutes 2 seconds over Ullrich. Armstrong took one stage in the 2000 Tour, the second individual time trial on stage 19. At the Summer Olympics 2000, Armstrong raced to third place in the Men's road time trial. In 2013, he was stripped of the bronze medal and third place title by the IOC after he was found guilty of doping. In September that year, Armstrong returned his medal to Olympic officials.

In 2001, Armstrong again took top honors at the Tour de France, beating Ullrich by 6 minutes 44 seconds. In 2002, Ullrich did not participate due to suspension, and Armstrong won by seven minutes over Joseba Beloki. During stage eleven and twelve of this Tour is when the race was won as US Postal had Vuelta champ Roberto Heras lead Armstrong up both climbs, breaking the peloton in the process. Then, when Heras' work was done, Armstrong took off to claim the stage wins only having to contend with Beloki.

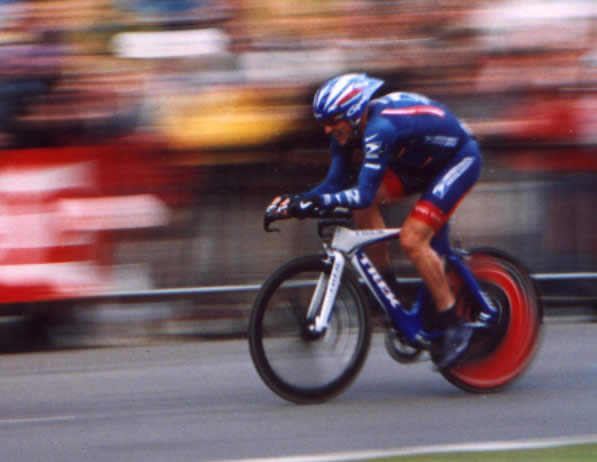
Armstrong riding the prologue of the 2004 Tour de France

The pattern returned in 2003, Armstrong taking first place and Ullrich second. Only a minute and a second separated the two at the end of the final day in Paris. U.S. Postal won the team time trial on stage 4, and on stage 9, Armstrong nearly crashed out of the Tour while defending the yellow jersey. He was less than a minute ahead of Beloki and Alexander Vinokourov was on a solo attack threatening to overtake Armstrong in the standings. While traversing the Côte de la Rochette Beloki crashed violently and hard, ending his Tour and sending him to the hospital with serious injuries. Armstrong narrowly avoided the same fate by reacting in time to avoid Beloki, but to do so he went off the road and ended up on a foot trail which led downhill through a field. He survived upright on his bike nearly to the end, at which time he picked it up and carried it the rest of the way to the road at the bottom of the hairpin turn, essentially losing no time as a result. He could have been fined or penalized for taking a shortcut, but it was deemed unintentional. Armstrong maintained a gap of only +0:21 over Vinokourov, but Ullrich was emerging as the most likely rider to overthrow Armstrong. Armstrong then took stage 15—despite having been knocked off on the ascent to Luz Ardiden, the final climb—when a spectator's bag caught his right handlebar. Ullrich waited for him, which brought Ullrich fair-play honors.

In 2004, Armstrong finished first, 6 minutes 19 seconds ahead of German Andreas Klöden. Ullrich was fourth, a further 2 minutes 31 seconds behind. Armstrong won a personal-best five individual stages, plus the team time trial. He became the first biker since Gino Bartali in 1948 to win three consecutive mountain stages; 15, 16, and 17. The individual time trial on stage 16 up Alpe d'Huez was won in style by Armstrong as he passed Ivan Basso on the way despite having set out two minutes after the Italian. He won sprint finishes from Basso in stages 13 and 15 and made up a significant gap in the last 250 m to nip Klöden at the line in stage 17. He won the final individual time trial, stage 19, to complete his personal record of stage wins.

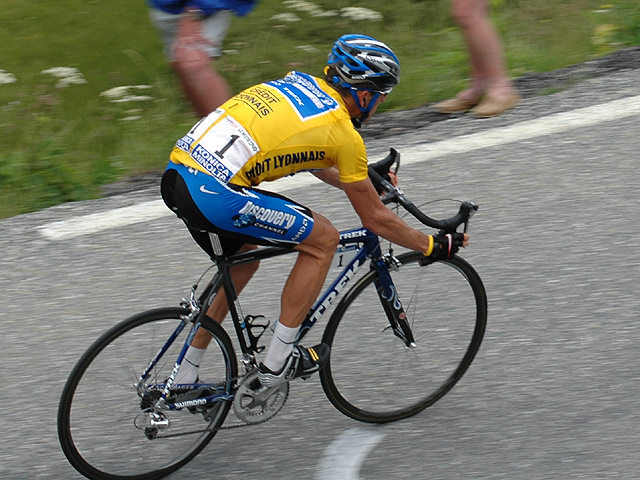
Armstrong wearing the yellow jersey at the 2005 Tour de France

In 2005, Armstrong was beaten by American David Zabriskie in the stage 1 time trial by two seconds, despite having passed Ullrich on the road. His Discovery Channel team won the team time trial, while Armstrong won the final individual time trial. In the mountain stages, Armstrong's lead was attacked multiple times mostly by Ivan Basso, but also by T-mobile leaders Jan Ullrich, Andreas Klöden and Alexandre Vinokourov and former teammate Levi Leipheimer. But still, the American champion handled them well, maintained his lead and, on some occasions, increased it. To complete his record-breaking feat, he crossed the line on the Champs-Élysées on July 24 to win his seventh consecutive Tour, finishing 4m 40s ahead of Basso, with Ullrich third. Another record achieved that year was that Armstrong completed the tour at the highest pace in the race's history: his average speed over the whole tour was 41.7 km/h (26 mph). In 2005, Armstrong announced he would retire after the 2005 Tour de France, citing his desire to spend more time with his family and his foundation. During his retirement, Armstrong diverted his attention away from the happenings in professional cycling; however whilst at a conference, in 2008, Armstrong saw Carlos Sastre's win on Alpe d'Huez and "felt a pang".

=== Comeback ===
==== Astana Pro Team: 2009 ====
On September 9, 2008, Armstrong announced that he would return to pro cycling with the express goal of participating in the 2009 Tour de France. VeloNews reported that Armstrong would race for no salary or bonuses and would post his internally tested blood results online.

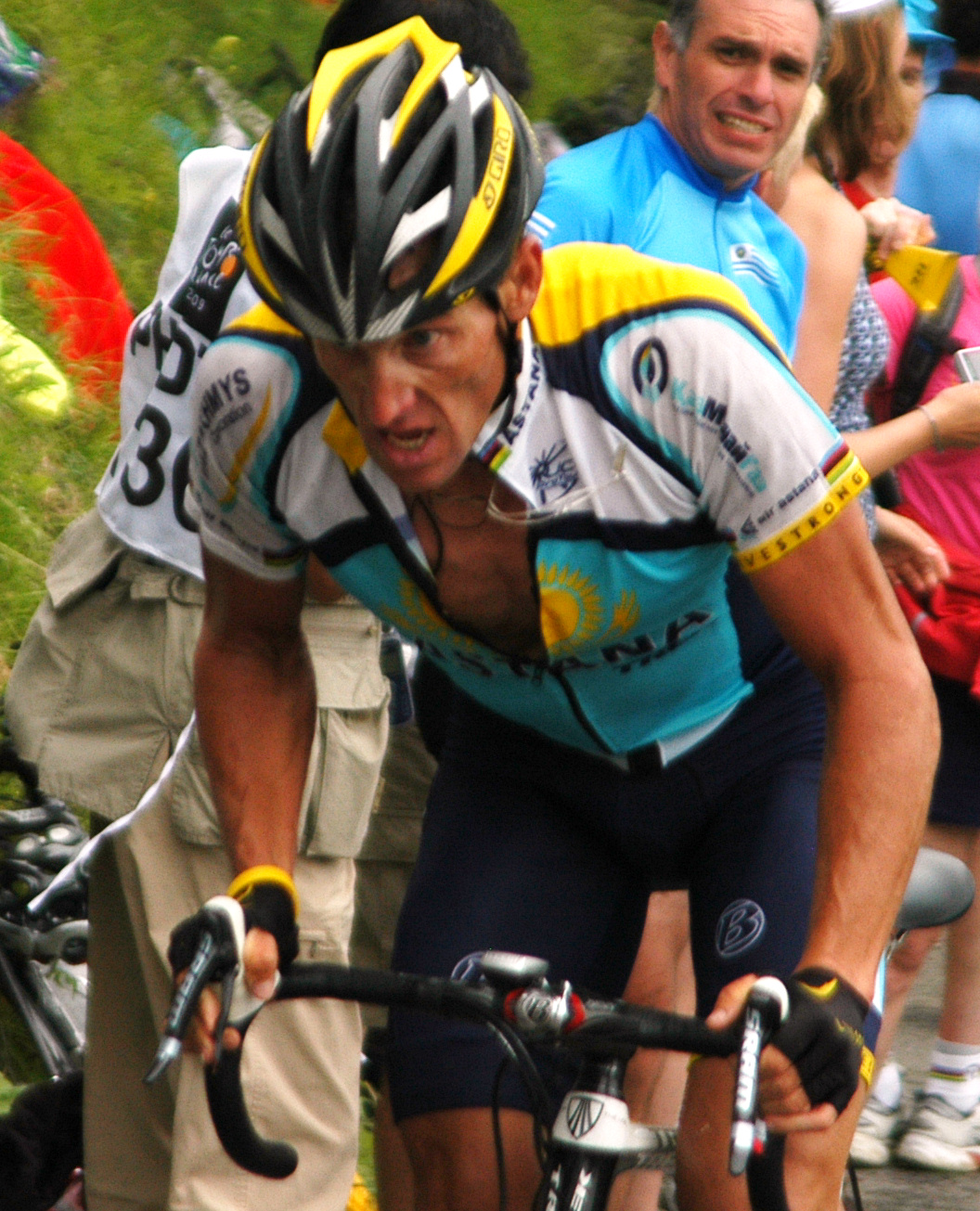
Armstrong riding for Astana on Stage 17 of the 2009 Tour de France

Australian ABC radio reported on September 24, 2008, that Armstrong would compete in the UCI Tour Down Under through Adelaide and surrounding areas in January 2009. UCI rules say a cyclist has to be in an anti-doping program for six months before an event, but UCI allowed Armstrong to compete. He had to retire from the 2009 Vuelta a Castilla y León during the first stage after crashing in a rider pileup in Baltanás, Spain, and breaking his collarbone. Armstrong flew back to Austin, Texas, for corrective surgery, which was successful, and was back training on a bicycle within four days of his operation.

On April 10, 2009, a controversy emerged between the French anti-doping agency AFLD and Armstrong and his team manager, Johan Bruyneel, stemming from a March 17, 2009, encounter with an AFLD anti-doping official who visited Armstrong after a training ride in Beaulieu-sur-Mer. When the official arrived, Armstrong claims he asked—and was granted—permission to take a shower while Bruyneel checked the official's credentials. In late April, the AFLD cleared Armstrong of any wrongdoing. He returned to racing after his collarbone injury at the Tour of the Gila in New Mexico on April 29.

On July 7, in the fourth stage of the 2009 Tour de France, Armstrong narrowly failed to win the yellow jersey after his Astana team won the team time trial. His Astana team won the 39 km lap of Montpellier but Armstrong ended up just over two tenths of a second (0.22) outside Fabian Cancellara's overall lead. Armstrong finished the 2009 Tour de France on the podium in third place. The only riders able to drop him were Andy Schleck who was able to defeat him by +1:13 and his own Astana teammate Alberto Contador, who won the Tour by more than four minutes over Schleck.

==== Team RadioShack: 2010–11 ====
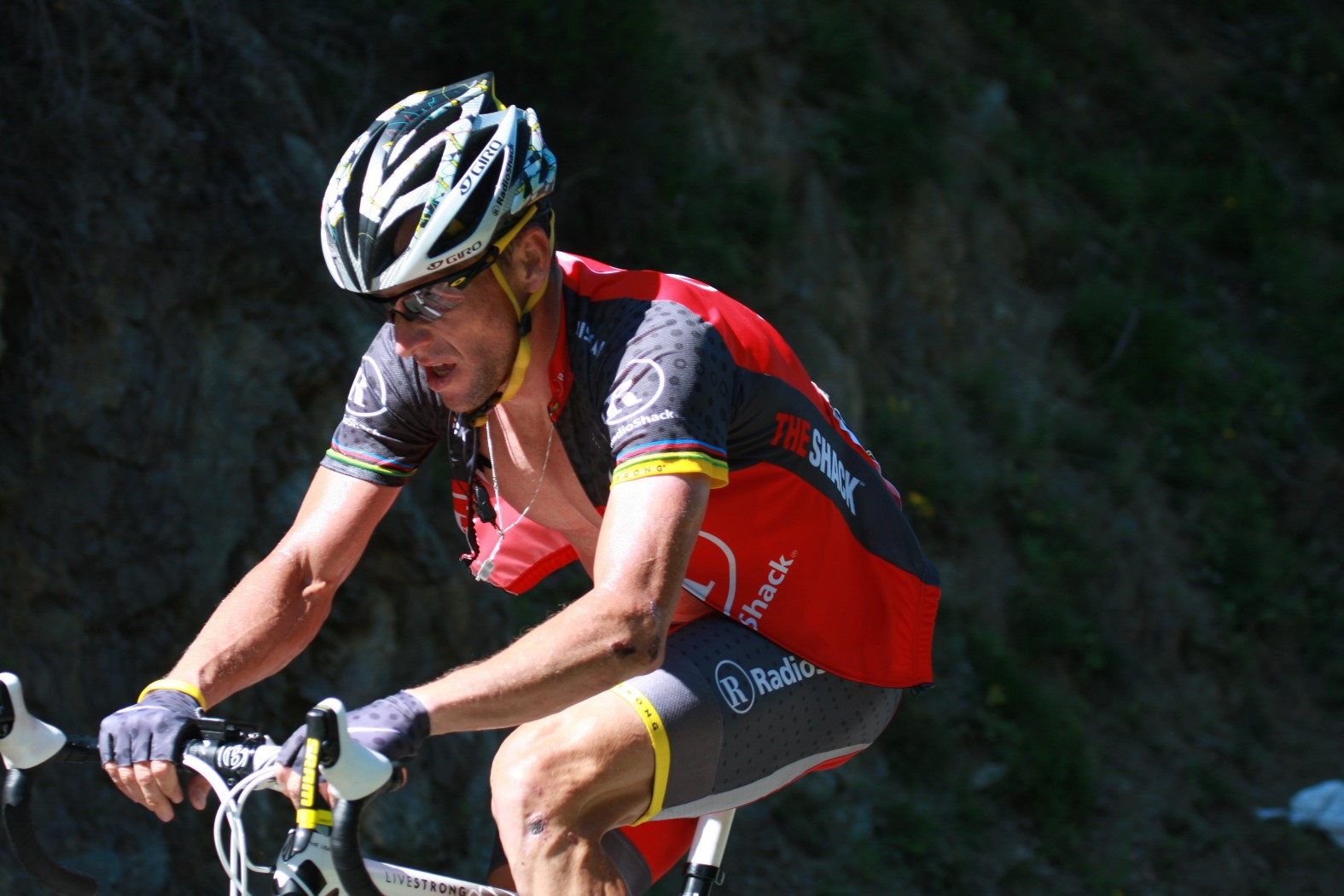
Armstong riding in the 2010 Tour de France in his RadioShack jersey

On July 21, 2009, Armstrong announced that he would return to the Tour de France in 2010. RadioShack was named as the main sponsor for Armstrong's 2010 team, named Team RadioShack. He made his 2010 season debut at the Tour Down Under, where Armstrong finished 25th out of the 127 riders who completed the race. He made his European season debut at the 2010 Vuelta a Murcia, finishing in seventh place overall. Armstrong was also set to compete in several classics such as the Milan–San Remo, Amstel Gold Race, Liège–Bastogne–Liège, and the Tour of Flanders, but bouts with gastroenteritis forced his withdrawal from three of the four races.

Armstrong returned to the United States in mid-April to compete in the Tour of Gila and May's Tour of California, both as preparation for the Tour de France. However, he crashed outside Visalia early in stage 5 of the Tour of California and had to withdraw from the race. He showed fine shape after recovering from the Tour of California crash, placing second in the Tour of Switzerland and third in the Tour of Luxembourg.

On June 28, Armstrong announced via Twitter that the 2010 edition would be his final Tour de France. Armstrong put in an impressive performance in the Tour's prologue time trial, finishing fourth. Only time trial specialists were able to better Armstrong's time and he was the highest placed of the GC contenders with a young, relatively unknown rider, Geraint Thomas, finishing one second behind him and Contador four seconds slower. In all eight of Armstrong's Tours since his comeback in 1999 he always had the requisite good luck early in the Tour and never got involved in crashes or mechanicals, which could cost him serious time. In 2010 his luck ran out early as he lost serious time due to the aftermath and peloton splits caused by a crash on stage 3, and then another crash on stage 8. He rallied for the brutal Pyrenean stage 16, working as a key player in a successful break that included teammate Chris Horner. He finished his last tour in 23rd place, 39 minutes 20 seconds behind former winner Alberto Contador. He was also a key rider in helping Team RadioShack win the team competition, beating Caisse d'Epargne by 9 minutes, 15 seconds. In October, he announced the end of his international career after the Tour Down Under in January 2011. He stated that after January 2011, he will race only in the U.S. with the Radioshack domestic team.

On February 16, 2011, Armstrong announced his retirement from competitive cycling "for good" while still facing a US federal investigation into doping allegations.

=== Collaboration of sponsors ===
Armstrong improved the support behind his well-funded teams, asking sponsors and suppliers to contribute and act as part of the team. For example, rather than having the frame, handlebars, and tires designed and developed by separate companies with little interaction, his teams adopted a Formula One relationship with sponsors and suppliers named "F-One", taking full advantage of the combined resources of several organizations working in close communication. The team, Trek, Nike, AMD, Bontrager (a Trek company), Shimano, Sram, Giro, and Oakley, collaborated for an array of products.

== Doping allegations, investigation, and confession ==
For much of his career, Armstrong faced persistent allegations of doping. He denied all such allegations until January 2013, often claiming that he never had any positive test in the drug tests he had taken over his cycling career.

Armstrong has been criticized for his disagreements with outspoken opponents of doping such as Paul Kimmage and Christophe Bassons. Bassons was a rider for Festina at the time of the Festina affair and was widely reported by teammates as being the only rider on the team not to be taking performance-enhancing drugs. Bassons wrote a number of articles for a French newspaper during the 1999 Tour de France which made references to doping in the peloton. Subsequently, Armstrong had an altercation with Bassons during the 1999 Tour de France where Bassons said Armstrong rode up alongside on the Alpe d'Huez stage to tell him "it was a mistake to speak out the way I (Bassons) do and he (Armstrong) asked why I was doing it. I told him that I'm thinking of the next generation of riders. Then he said 'Why don't you leave, then?'".

Armstrong later confirmed the story, stating on the main evening news on TF1, a national television station: "His accusations aren't good for cycling, for his team, for me, for anybody. If he thinks cycling works like that, he's wrong and he would be better off going home." Kimmage, a professional cyclist in the 1980s who later became a sports journalist, referred to Armstrong as a "cancer in cycling". He also asked Armstrong questions in relation to his "admiration for dopers" at a press conference at the Tour of California in 2009, provoking a scathing reaction from Armstrong. This spat continued and is exemplified by Kimmage's articles in The Irish Independent.

Armstrong continued to deny the use of illegal performance-enhancing drugs for four more years, describing himself as the most tested athlete in the world. From his return to cycling in the fall of 2008 through March 2009, Armstrong claimed to have submitted to 24 unannounced drug tests by various anti-doping authorities.

=== Working with Michele Ferrari ===
Armstrong was criticized for working with controversial trainer Michele Ferrari. Ferrari claimed that he was introduced to Lance by Eddy Merckx in 1995. Greg LeMond described himself as "devastated" on hearing of them working together, while Tour de France organizer Jean-Marie Leblanc said, "I am not happy the two names are mixed." Following Ferrari's later-overturned conviction for "sporting fraud" and "abuse of the medical profession", Armstrong claimed that he suspended his professional relationship with Ferrari, saying that he had "zero tolerance for anyone convicted of using or facilitating the use of performance-enhancing drugs" and denying that Ferrari had ever "suggested, prescribed or provided me with any performance-enhancing drugs".

Though Ferrari was banned from practicing medicine with cyclists by the Italian Cycling Federation, according to Italian law enforcement authorities, Armstrong met with Ferrari as late as 2010 in a country outside Italy. According to Cycling News, "USADA reveals an intimate role played by Dr. Michele Ferrari in masterminding Armstrong's Tour de France success". According to the USADA report, Armstrong paid Ferrari over $1 million from 1996 to 2006, countering Armstrong's claim that he severed his professional relationship with Ferrari in 2004. The report also includes numerous eyewitness accounts of Ferrari injecting Armstrong with EPO on a number of occasions.

=== L.A. Confidentiel: 2004 ===
In 2004, reporters Pierre Ballester and David Walsh published a book alleging Armstrong had used performance-enhancing drugs (L.A. Confidentiel – Les secrets de Lance Armstrong). Another figure in the book, Steve Swart, claims he and other riders, including Armstrong, began using drugs in 1995 while members of the Motorola team, a claim denied by other team members.

Among the allegations in the book were claims by Armstrong's former soigneur Emma O'Reilly that a backdated prescription for cortisone had been produced in 1999 to avoid a positive test. A 1999 urine sample at the Tour de France showed traces of corticosteroid. A medical certificate showed he used an approved cream for saddle sores which contained the substance. O'Reilly said she heard team officials worrying about Armstrong's positive test for steroids during the Tour. She said: "They were in a panic, saying: 'What are we going to do? What are we going to do?'".

According to O'Reilly, the solution was to obtain a pre-dated prescription for a steroid-based ointment used to treat saddle sores from one of the team's compliant doctors. O'Reilly said that she would have been aware if Armstrong had saddle sores as she would have been responsible for administering any treatment. O'Reilly said that Armstrong told her: "Now, Emma, you know enough to bring me down." O'Reilly said that she was also asked to dispose of used syringes for Armstrong and to pick up strange parcels for the team.

Allegations in the book were reprinted in The Sunday Times (UK) by deputy sports editor Alan English in June 2004. Armstrong sued for libel, and the paper settled out of court after a High Court judge in a pre-trial ruling stated that the article "meant accusation of guilt and not simply reasonable grounds to suspect". The newspaper's lawyers issued the statement: "The Sunday Times has confirmed to Mr. Armstrong that it never intended to accuse him of being guilty of taking any performance-enhancing drugs and sincerely apologized for any such impression." The same authors (Pierre Ballester and David Walsh) subsequently published L.A. Official and Le Sale Tour (The Dirty Trick), further pressing their claims that Armstrong used performance-enhancing drugs throughout his career.

On March 31, 2005, Mike Anderson filed a brief in Travis County District Court in Texas, as part of a legal battle following his termination in November 2004 as an employee of Armstrong. Anderson worked for Armstrong for two years as a personal assistant. In the brief, Anderson claimed that he discovered a box of 'androstenin' while cleaning a bathroom in Armstrong's apartment in Girona, Spain. 'Androstenin' is not on the list of banned drugs. Anderson stated in a subsequent deposition that he had no direct knowledge of Armstrong using a banned substance. Armstrong denied the claim and issued a counter-suit. The two men reached an out-of-court settlement in November 2005; the terms of the agreement were not disclosed.

In November 2012, Times Newspapers republished all of Walsh's articles as well as the original "LA Confidential" article by Alan English in Lanced: The shaming of Lance Armstrong. The Times was said to be considering taking action to recoup money from Armstrong in relation to the settlement and court costs.

In December 2012 The Sunday Times filed suit against Armstrong for $1.5 million. In its suit, the paper sought a return of the original settlement, plus interest and the cost of defending the original case.

In August 2013, Armstrong and The Sunday Times reached an undisclosed settlement.

=== Tour de France urine tests: 2005 ===
On August 23, 2005, L'Équipe, a major French daily sports newspaper, reported on its front page under the headline "le mensonge Armstrong" ('The Armstrong Lie') that six urine samples taken from the cyclist during the prologue and five stages of the 1999 Tour de France, frozen and stored since at "Laboratoire national de dépistage du dopage de Châtenay-Malabry" (LNDD), had tested positive for erythropoietin (EPO) in recent retesting conducted as part of a research project into EPO testing methods.

Armstrong immediately replied on his website, saying, "Unfortunately, the witch hunt continues and tomorrow's article is nothing short of tabloid journalism. The paper even admits in its own article that the science in question here is faulty and that I have no way to defend myself. They state: 'There will therefore be no counter-exam nor regulatory prosecutions, in a strict sense, since defendant's rights cannot be respected'. I will simply restate what I have said many times: I have never taken performance enhancing drugs."

In October 2005, in response to calls from the International Olympic Committee and the World Anti-Doping Agency (WADA) for an independent investigation, the UCI appointed Dutch lawyer Emile Vrijman to investigate the handling of urine tests by the French national anti-doping laboratory, LNDD. Vrijman was head of the Dutch anti-doping agency for ten years; since then he has worked as a defense attorney defending high-profile athletes against doping charges. Vrijman's report cleared Armstrong because of improper handling and testing. The report said tests on urine samples were conducted improperly and fell so short of scientific standards that it was "completely irresponsible" to suggest they "constitute evidence of anything".

The recommendation of the commission's report was no disciplinary action against any rider on the basis of LNDD research. It also called upon the WADA and LNDD to submit themselves to an investigation by an outside independent authority. The IOC Ethics Commission subsequently censured Dick Pound, the President of WADA and a member of the IOC, for his statements in the media that suggested wrongdoing by Armstrong. In April 2009, anti-doping expert Michael Ashenden said "the LNDD absolutely had no way of knowing athlete identity from the sample they're given. They have a number on them, but that's never linked to an athlete's name. The only group that had both the number and the athlete's name is the federation, in this case it was the UCI." He added "There was only two conceivable ways that synthetic EPO could've gotten into those samples. One, is that Lance Armstrong used EPO during the '99 Tour. The other way it could've got in the urine was if, as Lance Armstrong seems to believe, the laboratory spiked those samples. Now, that's an extraordinary claim, and there's never ever been any evidence the laboratory has ever spiked an athlete's sample, even during the Cold War, where you would've thought there was a real political motive to frame an athlete from a different country. There's never been any suggestion that it happened."

=== SCA Promotions case: 2005–2015 ===
In June 2006, French newspaper Le Monde reported claims by Betsy and Frankie Andreu during a deposition that Armstrong had admitted to using performance-enhancing drugs to his physician just after brain surgery in 1996. The Andreus' testimony was related to litigation between Armstrong and SCA Promotions, a Texas company attempting to withhold a $5 million bonus; this was settled out of court with SCA paying Armstrong and Tailwind Sports $7.5 million, to cover the $5 million bonus plus interest and lawyers' fees. The testimony stated "And so the doctor asked him a few questions, not many, and then one of the questions he asked was [...] have you ever used any performance-enhancing drugs? And Lance said yes. And the doctor asked, what were they? And Lance said, growth hormone, cortisone, EPO, steroids and testosterone."

Armstrong suggested Betsy Andreu may have been confused by possible mention of his post-operative treatment, which included steroids and EPO that are taken to counteract wasting and red-blood-cell-destroying effects of intensive chemotherapy. The Andreus' allegation was not supported by any of the eight other people present, including Armstrong's doctor Craig Nichols, or his medical history. According to Greg LeMond (who has been embroiled with his own disputes with Armstrong), he (LeMond) had a recorded conversation, the transcript of which was reviewed by National Public Radio (NPR), with Stephanie McIlvain (Armstrong's contact at Oakley Inc.) in which she said of Armstrong's alleged admission, "You know, I was in that room. I heard it." However, McIlvain has contradicted LeMond's allegations on the issue and denied under oath that the incident in question ever occurred in her sworn testimony.

In July 2006, the Los Angeles Times published a story on the allegations raised in the SCA case. The report cited evidence at the trial, including the results of the LNDD test and an analysis of these results by an expert witness. From the Los Angeles Times article: "The results, Australian researcher Michael Ashenden testified in Dallas, show Armstrong's levels rising and falling, consistent with a series of injections during the Tour. Ashenden, a paid expert retained by SCA Promotions, told arbitrators that the results painted a "compelling picture" that the world's most famous cyclist "used EPO in the '99 Tour"."

Ashenden's finding were disputed by the Vrijman report, which pointed to procedural and privacy issues in dismissing the LNDD test results. The Los Angeles Times article also provided information on testimony given by Armstrong's former teammate, Swart, Andreu and his wife Betsy, and instant messaging conversation between Andreu and Jonathan Vaughters regarding blood-doping in the peloton. Vaughters signed a statement disavowing the comments and stating he had: "no personal knowledge that any team in the Tour de France, including Armstrong's Discovery team in 2005, engaged in any prohibited conduct whatsoever." Andreu signed a statement affirming the conversation took place as indicated on the instant messaging logs submitted to the court.

The SCA trial was settled out of court, and the Los Angeles Times reported: "Though no verdict or finding of facts was rendered, Armstrong called the outcome proof that the doping allegations were baseless." The Los Angeles Times article provides a review of the disputed positive EPO test, allegations and sworn testimony against Armstrong, but notes that, "They are filled with conflicting testimony, hearsay and circumstantial evidence admissible in arbitration hearings but questionable in more formal legal proceedings."

In October 2012, following the publication of the USADA reasoned decision, SCA Promotions announced its intention to recoup the monies paid to Armstrong totaling in excess of $7 million. Armstrong's legal representative Tim Herman stated in June: "When SCA decided to settle the case, it settled the entire matter forever. No backs. No re-dos. No do-overs. SCA knowingly and independently waived any right to make further claims to any of the money it paid." SCA's Jeff Dorough stated that on October 30, 2012, Armstrong was sent a formal request for the return of $12 million in bonuses. It is alleged that Armstrong's legal team has offered a settlement of $1 million.

On February 4, 2015, the arbitration panel decided 2–1 in SCA's favor and ordered Armstrong and Tailwind Sports Corp to pay SCA $10 million. The panel's decision was referred to the Texas 116th Civil District Court in Dallas on February 16, 2015, for confirmation. Panel members Richard Faulkner and Richard Chernick sided with SCA; Ted Lyon sided with Armstrong. Armstrong's attorney Tim Herman stated that the panel's ruling was contrary to Texas law and expected that the court would overturn it. The panel's decision said, in part, about Armstrong that, "Perjury must never be profitable" and "it is almost certainly the most devious sustained deception ever perpetrated in world sporting history".

On September 27, 2015, Armstrong and SCA agreed to a settlement. Armstrong issued a formal, public apology and agreed to pay SCA an undisclosed sum.

=== Federal investigation: 2010–2012 ===
In a series of emails in May 2010, Floyd Landis admitted to doping and accused Armstrong and others of the same. Based on Landis' allegations, U.S. Justice Department federal prosecutors led an investigation into possible crimes conducted by Armstrong and the U.S. Postal Service Cycling Team. The Food and Drug Administration and federal agent Jeff Novitzky were also involved in the investigation. In June 2010, Armstrong hired a criminal defense attorney to represent him in the investigation. The hiring was first reported in July when Armstrong was competing in the 2010 Tour de France.

On February 3, 2012, federal prosecutors officially dropped their criminal investigation with no charges. The closing of the case was announced "without an explanation" by U.S. Attorney André Birotte Jr. When Novitzky was asked to comment on it, he declined.

In February 2013, a month after Armstrong admitted to doping, the Justice Department joined Landis' whistleblower lawsuit to recover government funding given to Armstrong's cycling team.

=== USADA investigation and limited confession: 2011–2013 ===
In June 2012, the United States Anti-Doping Agency (USADA) accused Armstrong of doping and trafficking of drugs, based on blood samples from 2009 and 2010, and testimony from witnesses including former teammates. Further, he was accused of putting pressure on teammates to take unauthorized performance-enhancing drugs as well. In October 2012, USADA formally charged him with running a massive doping ring. It also sought to ban him from participating in sports sanctioned by WADA for life. Armstrong chose not to appeal the findings, saying it would not be worth the toll on his family. As a result, he was stripped of all of his achievements from August 1998 onward, including his seven Tour de France titles. He also received a lifetime ban from all sports that follow the World Anti-Doping Code. As nearly all national and international sporting federations, including UCI, follow the World Anti-Doping Code, this effectively ended his competitive cycling career. The International Cycling Union (UCI) upheld USADA's decision and decided that his stripped wins would not be allocated to other riders. (Note: Other top riders in the 1999 to 2005 Tours have also been involved in doping scandals. Several riders were banned and some also had their results stripped; some subsequently admitted to doping. Those riders include Jan Ullrich, Marco Pantani, Andreas Klöden, Joseba Beloki, Raimondas Rumšas, Alex Zülle, Ivan Basso, and Alexander Vinokourov. UCI stated that "a cloud of suspicion would remain hanging over that period." And so, while noting that their decision "might appear harsh for those who rode clean", UCI decided "with respect to Lance Armstrong" that those seven Tours would have no official winner, rather than being allocated to other riders.)

After years of public denials, in a January 2013 interview with Oprah Winfrey, Armstrong reversed course and made a "limited confession" to doping. While admitting wrongdoing in the interview, he also said it was "absolutely not" true that he was doping in 2009 or 2010, and claimed that the last time he "crossed the line" was in 2005. He also denied pressuring team-mates into doping. In September 2013, he was asked by UCI's new president, Brian Cookson, to testify about his doping. Armstrong refused to testify until and unless he received complete amnesty, which Cookson said was most unlikely to happen. (Note: In return for co-operating with USADA (during its investigation in 2012), Armstrong's teammates were given reduced bans in line with WADA guidelines allowing reduction of ban for "Significant Co-Operation". Armstrong made demands in return for testifying completely. Brian Cookson of the UCI said that it was most unlikely that the USADA would agree to Armstrong's demands. In response to that, Armstrong refused to testify.)

After USADA's report, all of Armstrong's sponsors dropped him. He reportedly lost $75 million of sponsorship income in a day. On May 28, 2013, Nike announced that it would be cutting all ties to Livestrong. In the aftermath of Armstrong's fall from grace, a CNN article wrote that, "The epic downfall of cycling's star, once an idolized icon of millions around the globe, stands out in the history of professional sports." In a 2015 interview with BBC News, Armstrong stated that if it were still 1995, he would "probably do it again".

In August 2016 Armstrong's doping ban from competing from sports outside cycling was partially lifted.

=== Whistleblower lawsuit: 2010–2018 ===
In 2010, one of Armstrong's former teammates, the American Floyd Landis, whose 2006 Tour de France victory was nullified after a positive doping test, sent a series of emails to cycling officials and sponsors admitting to, and detailing, his systematic use of performance-enhancing drugs during his career. The emails also claimed that other riders and cycling officials participated in doping, including Armstrong.

Landis filed a federal whistleblower lawsuit against Armstrong under the federal False Claims Act. The False Claims Act allows citizens to sue on behalf of the government alleging the government has been defrauded. The existence of the lawsuit, initially filed under seal, was first revealed by The Wall Street Journal in 2010. In the lawsuit, Landis alleged that Armstrong and team managers defrauded the US government when they accepted money from the US Postal Service. In January 2013, US Justice Department officials recommended joining the federal lawsuit aimed at clawing back money from Armstrong.

In February, the US Department of Justice joined the whistleblower lawsuit, which also accused former Postal Service team director Johan Bruyneel and Tailwind Sports, the firm that managed the US Postal Service team, of defrauding the US.

In April 2014, documents from the AIC case were filed by lawyers representing Landis in relation to the whistleblower suit. In these documents, Armstrong stated under oath that Jose "Pepi" Marti, Pedro Celaya, Luis Garcia del Moral, and Michele Ferrari had all provided him with doping products in the period up until 2005. He also named people who had transported or acted as couriers, as well as people that were aware of his doping practices. One week later, the USADA banned Bruyneel from cycling for ten years and Celaya and Marti for eight years.

In June 2014, US district judge Robert Wilkins denied Armstrong's request to dismiss the government lawsuit stating "The court denies without prejudice the defendants' motion to dismiss the government's action as time-barred."

In February 2017, the court determined that the federal government's US$100 million civil lawsuit against Armstrong, started by Landis, would proceed to trial. The matter was settled in April 2018 when Armstrong agreed to pay the United States Government US$5 million. During the proceedings it was revealed that the US Postal Service had paid US$31 million in sponsorship to Armstrong and Tailwind Sports between 2001 and 2004. The Department of Justice accused Armstrong of violating his contract with the USPS and committing fraud when he denied using performance-enhancing drugs. It was reported that Landis would receive US$1.1 million as a result of his whistleblower actions.

=== Other lawsuits: 2010 to present ===
In November 2013, Armstrong settled a lawsuit with Acceptance Insurance Company (AIC). AIC had sought to recover $3 million it had paid Armstrong as bonuses for winning the Tour de France from 1999 to 2001. The suit was settled for an undisclosed sum one day before Armstrong was scheduled to give a deposition under oath.

== Personal life ==
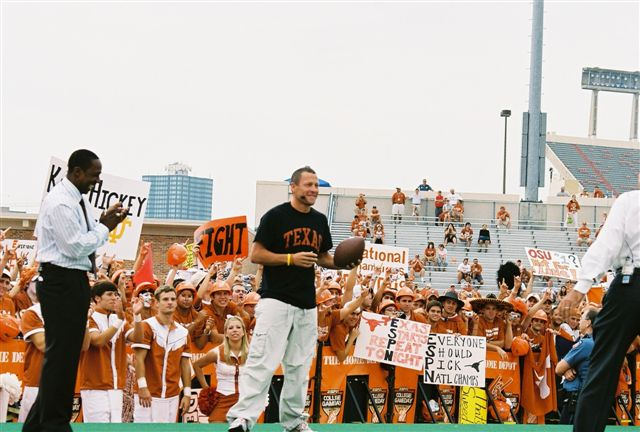
Armstrong (center) on the set of College GameDay during the 2006 UT football season

Armstrong owns homes in Austin, Texas, and Aspen, Colorado, as well as a ranch in the Texas Hill Country.

=== Relationships and children ===
Armstrong met Kristin Richard in June 1997. They married on May 1, 1998, and had three children: a son (born October 1999) and twin daughters (born November 2001). The pregnancies were made possible through sperm Armstrong banked three years earlier, before chemotherapy and surgery. The couple divorced in 2003.

The same year that Lance and Kristin Armstrong were divorced, Lance began dating singer-songwriter Sheryl Crow. The couple announced their engagement in September 2005 and their split in February 2006.

In July 2008, Armstrong began dating Anna Hansen after meeting through Armstrong's charity work. In December 2008, Armstrong announced that Hansen was pregnant with the couple's first child. Although it was believed that Armstrong could no longer father children due to having undergone chemotherapy for testicular cancer, the child was conceived naturally. They have a son (born June 2009) and a daughter (born October 2010). They were married on August 9, 2022.

=== Politics ===
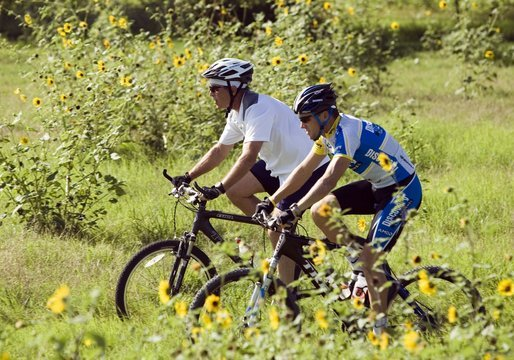
President George W. Bush and Armstrong mountain biking at the president's Prairie Chapel Ranch

In a New York Times article, teammate George Hincapie hinted that Armstrong would run for Governor of Texas after cycling. In the July 2005 issue of Outside magazine, Armstrong hinted at running for governor, although "not in '06". Armstrong and former president George W. Bush, a Republican and fellow Texan, call themselves friends. Bush called Armstrong in France to congratulate him after his 2005 victory. In August 2005, The Times reported the President had invited Armstrong to his Prairie Chapel Ranch to go mountain biking. In a 2003 interview with The Observer, Armstrong said: "He's a personal friend, but we've all got the right not to agree with our friends."

In August 2005, Armstrong hinted he had changed his mind about politics. In an interview with Charlie Rose on PBS on August 1, 2005, Armstrong pointed out that running for governor would require the commitment that led him to retire from cycling. Also, in August 2005, Armstrong said that he was no longer considering politics:

The biggest problem with politics or running for the governor—the governor's race here in Austin or in Texas—is that it would mimic exactly what I've done: a ton of stress and a ton of time away from my kids. Why would I want to go from pro cycling, which is stressful and a lot of time away, straight into politics?

Armstrong created a YouTube video in 2007 with former president George H. W. Bush to successfully pass Proposition 15, a US$3 billion taxpayer bond initiative which created the Cancer Prevention and Research Institute of Texas.

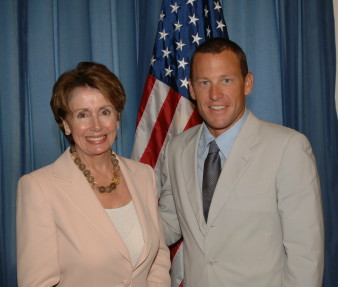
Armstrong and Congresswoman Nancy Pelosi

Armstrong was co-chair of a California campaign committee to pass the California Cancer Research Act, a ballot measure defeated by California voters on June 5, 2012. Had it passed, the measure was projected to generate over $500 million annually for cancer research, smoking-cessation programs and tobacco law-enforcement by levying a $1-per-pack tax on tobacco products in California.

Armstrong endorsed Democratic Congressman Beto O'Rourke against Republican incumbent Senator Ted Cruz in the 2018 election.

=== Outside cycling ===
In 1997, Armstrong founded the Lance Armstrong Foundation, which supports people affected by cancer. The foundation raises awareness of cancer and has raised more than $325 million from the sale of yellow Livestrong bracelets. During his first retirement beginning after the 2005 season, he also maintained other interests. He was the pace car driver of the Chevrolet Corvette Z06 for the 2006 Indianapolis 500. In 2007, Armstrong with Andre Agassi, Muhammad Ali, Warrick Dunn, Jeff Gordon, Mia Hamm, Tony Hawk, Andrea Jaeger, Jackie Joyner-Kersee, Mario Lemieux, Alonzo Mourning, and Cal Ripken Jr. founded Athletes for Hope, a charity that helps professional athletes become involved in charitable causes and aims to inspire non-athletes to volunteer and support the community.

In August 2009, Armstrong headlined the inaugural charity ride "Pelotonia" in Columbus, Ohio, riding over 100 miles on Saturday with the large group of cyclists. He addressed the riders the Friday evening before the two-day ride and helped the ride raise millions for cancer research. Armstrong ran the 2006 New York City Marathon with two friends. He assembled a pace team of Alberto Salazar, Joan Benoit Samuelson, and Hicham El Guerrouj to help him reach three hours. He finished in 2h 59m 36s, in 856th place. He said the race was extremely difficult compared to the Tour de France. The NYC Marathon had a dedicated camera on Armstrong throughout the event which, according to Armstrong, pushed him to continue through points in which he would have normally "stopped and stretched". He also helped raise $600,000 for his LiveStrong campaign during the run. Armstrong ran the 2007 NYC Marathon in 2h 46m 43s, finishing 232nd. On April 21, 2008, he ran the Boston Marathon in 2h 50m 58s, finishing in the top 500.

Armstrong made a return to triathlon in 2011 by competing in the off-road XTERRA Triathlon race series. At the Championships Armstrong led for a time before crashing out on the bike and finishing in 23rd place. The following year, in 2012, Armstrong began pursuing qualification into the 2012 Ironman World Championship. He was scheduled to next participate in Ironman France on June 24. However, the June suspension by USADA and eventual ban by WADA prohibited Armstrong from further racing Ironman branded events due to World Triathlon Corporation anti-doping policies.

In July 2011 and July 2013, Armstrong participated in the non-competitive Register's Annual Great Bicycle Ride Across Iowa.

=== Business and investments ===
Outside cycling, Armstrong is also an active businessman and investor. He owns a coffee shop called "Juan Pelota Cafe" in downtown Austin, Texas. The name is a joking reference to his testicular cancer, with the name Juan being considered by some a homophone for one and Pelota being the Spanish word for 'ball'. In the same building, Armstrong owns and operates a bike shop named "Mellow Johnny's", after another nickname of his derived from the Tour term maillot jaune, which is French for yellow jersey, the jersey given to the leader of the general classification in the Tour de France.

In 2001, Armstrong provided financial funding to launch Wonders & Worries, a non-profit organization in Austin, Texas, that provides counseling and support for children who have a parent with a serious or life-threatening disease.

A line of cycling clothing from Nike, 10//2, was named after the date (October 2, 1996) Armstrong was diagnosed with testicular cancer.

In 2008, Armstrong bought several million dollars of stock in the American bicycle component manufacturer SRAM Corporation, and has served as their technical advisor. SRAM bought those shares back from him in preparation for a public offering. Armstrong owns a small share of Trek Bicycle Corporation.

In 2009, Armstrong invested $100,000 into venture capital firm Lowercase Capital, which subsequently bought an early stake in Uber, among other investments. In 2019, Uber achieved an IPO of $82 billion and earned Armstrong an estimated $20–$30 million. According to CNBC, Armstrong said "it saved our family".

Armstrong said that his investment in Lowercase Capital followed a meeting and subsequent friendship with Chris Sacca in Aspen, and that he only learned years later that the fund had invested in Uber.

== In popular culture ==
In September 2015, the biographical drama film The Program (2015 film), directed by Stephen Frears and starring Ben Foster as Armstrong and Chris O'Dowd as journalist David Walsh, was released. The movie is based on Walsh's 2012 book, Seven Deadly Sins.

In February 2026, it was announced that a film biopic about Armstrong was in development. The film will be directed by Edward Berger, with Berger, Scott Stuber and Nick Nesbit all serving as producers. The film is also being written by Zach Baylin. Austin Butler is also set to portray Armstrong.

== Media ==
In 2017, Armstrong started a podcast named "The Move", which provided daily coverage of the Tour de France in 2018 and 2019. He also appeared—without compensation—on NBC Sports Network's live Tour de France television broadcasts. The UCI indicated the podcast and NBC appearances did not violate the terms of his ban.

== Career achievements ==
=== Major results ===
==== Road ====
1990
8th Overall Tour of Sweden
1991
1st Road race, National Junior Road Championships
1992
1st Overall Fitchburg Longsjo Classic

1st Stage 2

1st First Union Grand Prix
1st Stage 6 Settimana Bergamasca
1st Stage 4a Vuelta a Galicia
1st Stage 2 Trittico Premondiale
2nd Züri-Metzgete
8th Coppa Bernocchi
1993
1st Road race, UCI Road World Championships
1st Road race, National Road Championships
1st Overall Kmart West Virginia Classic

1st Prologue & Stage 1

1st Overall Tour of America
1st Trofeo Laigueglia
1st Thrift Drug Classic
1st Stage 8 Tour de France
2nd Overall Tour DuPont

1st Stage 5

3rd Overall Tour of Sweden

1st Stage 3

5th Wincanton Classic
9th Overall Paris–Nice
1994
1st Thrift Drug Classic
2nd Overall Tour DuPont

1st Stage 7

2nd Liège–Bastogne–Liège
2nd Clásica de San Sebastián
7th Overall Tour de Suisse
7th Road race, UCI Road World Championships
9th Trofeo Laigueglia
9th Züri-Metzgete
1995
1st Overall Tour DuPont

1st Mountains classification
1st Stages 4, 5 (ITT) & 9

1st Overall Kmart West Virginia Classic

1st Stage 4

1st Clásica de San Sebastián
1st Stage 18 Tour de France
1st Stage 5 Paris–Nice
5th Road race, National Road Championships
6th Liège–Bastogne–Liège
10th Overall Vuelta a Burgos
10th Züri-Metzgete
1996
1st Overall Tour DuPont

1st Stages 2, 3b (ITT), 5, 6 & 12 (ITT)

1st La Flèche Wallonne
2nd Overall Paris–Nice
2nd Overall Ronde van Nederland
2nd Liège–Bastogne–Liège
2nd Grand Prix Eddy Merckx
4th Overall Tour de Suisse
4th Wincanton Classic
6th Time trial, Olympic Games
8th E3 Prijs Vlaanderen
9th LuK Challenge Chrono (with Sean Yates
1998
1st Overall Tour de Luxembourg

1st Stage 1

1st Overall Rheinland-Pfalz Rundfahrt
1st Cascade Cycling Classic
1st Sprint 56K Criterium
4th Overall Ronde van Nederland

Voided results from August 1998 onward

~~4th Overall Vuelta a España~~
~~4th Road race, UCI Road World Road Championships~~
1999
~~1st Overall Tour de France~~

~~1st Prologue, Stages 8 (ITT), 9 & 19 (ITT)~~

~~1st Stage 4 Route du Sud~~
~~1st Stage 4 (ITT) Circuit de la Sarthe~~
~~1st RaboRonde Heerlen~~
~~2nd Amstel Gold Race~~
~~7th Overall Vuelta a Aragón~~
~~8th Overall Critérium du Dauphiné Libéré~~

~~1st Prologue~~

2000
~~1st Overall Tour de France~~

~~1st Stage 19 (ITT)~~

~~1st Grand Prix des Nations~~
~~1st Grand Prix Eddy Merckx~~
~~2nd Paris–Camembert~~
~~3rd Overall Critérium du Dauphiné Libéré~~

~~1st Stage 3 (ITT)~~

~~3rd Time trial, Olympic Games~~
~~3rd Classique des Alpes~~
~~4th Grand Prix Gippingen~~
~~5th Züri-Metzgete~~
~~7th GP Miguel Induráin~~
2001
~~1st Overall Tour de France~~

~~1st Stages 10, 11 (ITT), 13 & 18 (ITT)~~

~~1st Overall Tour de Suisse~~

~~1st Stages 1 (ITT) & 8 (ITT)~~

~~2nd Amstel Gold Race~~
~~2nd Classique des Alpes~~
2002
~~1st Overall Tour de France~~

~~1st Prologue, Stages 11, 12 & 19 (ITT)~~

~~1st Overall Critérium du Dauphiné Libéré~~

~~1st Stage 6~~

~~1st Overall Grand Prix du Midi Libre~~
~~1st Profronde van Stiphout~~
~~2nd Overall Critérium International~~
~~3rd Züri-Metzgete~~
~~4th Amstel Gold Race~~
~~5th Grand Prix Eddy Merckx~~
~~6th San Francisco Grand Prix~~
~~8th LuK Challenge Chrono (with Floyd Landis)~~
2003
~~1st Overall Tour de France~~

~~1st Stages 4 (TTT) & 15~~

~~1st Overall Critérium du Dauphiné Libéré~~

~~1st Stage 3 (ITT)~~

~~6th LuK Challenge Chrono (with Viatcheslav Ekimov)~~
~~8th Amstel Gold Race~~
2004
~~1st Overall Tour de France~~

~~1st Stages 4 (TTT), 13, 15, 16 (ITT), 17 & 19 (ITT)~~

~~1st Overall Tour de Georgia~~

~~1st Stages 3 & 4 (ITT)~~

~~1st Profronde van Stiphout~~
~~3rd Overall Critérium International~~
~~4th LuK Challenge Chrono (with George Hincapie)~~
~~5th Overall Volta ao Algarve~~

~~1st Stage 4 (ITT)~~

~~6th Overall Tour du Languedoc-Roussillon~~

~~1st Stage 5~~

2005
~~1st Overall Tour de France~~

~~1st Stages 4 (TTT) & 20 (ITT)~~

~~4th Overall Critérium du Dauphiné Libéré~~

~~1st Points classification~~

~~5th Overall Tour de Georgia~~
2009
~~1st Nevada City Classic~~
~~2nd Overall Tour of the Gila~~
~~3rd Overall Tour de France~~

~~1st Stage 4 (TTT)~~

~~7th Overall Tour of California~~
2010
~~2nd Overall Tour de Suisse~~
~~3rd Overall Tour de Luxembourg~~
~~7th Overall Vuelta a Murcia~~

===== Grand Tour general classification results timeline =====
Grand Tour	1993	1994	1995	1996	1998	1999	2000	2001	2002	2003	2004	2005	2006	2007	2008	2009	2010
Giro d'Italia	—	—	—	—	—	—	—	—	—	—	—	—	—	—	—	~~12~~	—
Tour de France	DNF	DNF	36	DNF	—	~~1~~	~~1~~	~~1~~	~~1~~	~~1~~	~~1~~	~~1~~	—	—	—	~~3~~	~~23~~
/ Vuelta a España	—	—	—	—	~~4~~	—	—	—	—	—	—	—	—	—	—	—	—

Legend
—	Did not compete
DNF	Did not finish
~~No.~~	Voided result

==== Triathlon & Ironman ====
1989
2nd Bud Light U.S. Triathlon Series (USTS)–Miami (Olympic Distance)
1st National Sprint Course Triathlon
1990
1st National Sprint Course Triathlon
2011
5th XTERRA USA Championships
2012
1st Ironman 70.3 Hawaii
1st Ironman 70.3 Florida
3rd Ironman 70.3 St. Croix
7th Ironman 70.3 Texas
2nd Ironman 70.3 Panama
2nd Power of Four Mountain Bike Race

==== Mountain Bike ====
2008
1st 12 Hours of Snowmass
2nd Leadville Trail 100 Mountain Bike Race
2009
1st Colorado Pro Cross-Country Championships
1st Leadville Trail 100 Mountain Bike Race

== Filmography ==
- Road to Paris (2001), documentary
- DodgeBall: A True Underdog Story (2004), cameo appearance
- You, Me and Dupree (2006), cameo appearance
- The Armstrong Lie (2013), documentary
- Stop at Nothing: The Lance Armstrong Story (2014), documentary
- The Program (2015), biographical drama film
- Tour de Pharmacy (2017), appearing as himself, acting as parody of an anonymous source
- 30 for 30: Lance (2020), documentary

== Accolades ==
- United States Olympic Committee (USOC) SportsMan of the Year (1999, 2001, 2002, 2003)
- Associated Press Male Athlete of the Year (2002, 2003, 2004, 2005)
- World's Most Outstanding Athlete Award, Jesse Owens International Trophy (2000)
- Reuters Sportsman of the Year (2003)
- Prince of Asturias Award in Sports (2000)
- Sports Ethics Fellows by the Institute for International Sport (2003)
- Mendrisio d'Or Award (1999)
- Premio Coppi-Bici d'Oro Trophy by the Fausto Coppi foundation in conjunction with La Gazzetta dello Sport (1999, 2000)
- Marca Legend Award by Marca, a Spanish sports daily in Madrid (2004)
- ESPY Award for Best Male Athlete (2003, 2004, 2005, 2006)
- ESPY Award for GMC Professional Grade Play Award (2005)
- ESPY Award for Best Comeback Athlete (2000)
- ESPN/Intersport's ARETE Award for Courage in Sport (Professional Division) (1999)
- ABC's Wide World of Sports Athlete of the Year (1999)
- Favorite Athlete award at Nickelodeon Kids' Choice Awards (2006)
- Presidential Delegation to the XIX Olympic Winter Games (2002)
- Sports Illustrated magazine's Sportsman of the Year (2002)
- VeloNews magazine's International Cyclist of the Year (2000, 2001, 2003, 2004)
- VeloNews magazine's North American Male Cyclist of the Year (1993, 1995, 1996, 1998, 1999, 2002, 2005)
- William Hill Sports Book of the Year: It's Not About the Bike: My Journey Back to Life (2000)
- Triathlon magazine's Rookie of the Year (1988)
- Pace car driver for the Indianapolis 500 (2006)
- An asteroid, 1994 JE_{9} was named 12373 Lancearmstrong in honor of him.
- Six-mile Lance Armstrong Bikeway through downtown Austin, Texas, built by the city of Austin at a cost of $3.2 million.
- Mildred "Babe" Didrikson Zaharias Courage Award presented by the United States Sports Academy (1999)
- Samuel S. Beard Award for Greatest Public Service by an Individual 35 Years or Under, an award given out annually by Jefferson Awards (2001)

Rescinded awards

- BBC Overseas Sports Personality of the Year Award (2003)
- Honorary Doctorate of Humane Letters, Tufts University (2006)
- Key to the city of Adelaide (2012)
- Laureus World Sports Award for Sportsman of the Year Winner (2003)
- Laureus World Sports Award for Comeback of the Year Winner (2000)
- Laureus World Sports Award for Sportsman of the Year Nominated (2002, 2004, 2005, 2006)
- Laureus World Sports Award for Comeback of the Year Nominated (2010)
- Grand Prix Serge-Kampf de l'Académie des sports (France, 2004)
- Légion d'honneur (France, 2005)
- Vélo d'Or Award by Velo magazine in France (1999, 2000, 2001, 2003, 2004)

== See also ==
- Cycling records
- Doping in sport
- Doping in the United States
- List of doping cases in cycling

== Notes and references ==
Notes

== Published works ==
- Armstrong, Lance; Jenkins, Sally (2001). It's Not About the Bike: My Journey Back to Life. Yellow Jersey Press. ISBN 0-224-06087-2.
- Armstrong, Lance; Jenkins, Sally (2003). Every Second Counts. Broadway Books. ISBN 0-385-50871-9.

Awards and achievements
Preceded by (United Kingdom) Derek Birley	William Hill Sports Book of the Year winner 2000	Succeeded by (United States) Laura Hillenbrand
Preceded by Jonny Moseley; Rulon Gardner	USOC Sportsman of the Year; 1999; 2001–2003	Succeeded by Rulon Gardner; Michael Phelps
Preceded by (Germany) Steffi Graf	Prince of Asturias Award for Sports; 2000	Succeeded by (Spain) Manuel Estiarte
