= Sally Jenkins =

American journalist (born 1960)

- Born: October 11, 1960 (age 66); Fort Worth, Texas, U.S.
- Education: Stanford University (BA)
- Occupations: author, sports columnist, and feature writer
- Relatives: Dan Jenkins (father)
- Writing career
- Subject: sports
- Notable awards: William Hill Sports Book of the Year Award (2000); National Sportscasters and Sportswriters Hall of Fame (2005); Washington DC Sports Hall of Fame (2021); Red Smith Award (2021)

Sally Jenkins (born October 11, 1960) is an American feature writer for The Atlantic Monthly, and author. She was previously a writer for the Washington Post, and a senior writer for Sports Illustrated. She has won the AP Sports Columnist of the Year Award five times, received the National Press Foundation 2017 chairman citation, and was a finalist for the 2020 Pulitzer Prize. She is the author of a dozen books. Jenkins is noted for her writing on Pat Summitt, Joe Paterno, Lance Armstrong, and the United States Center for SafeSport.

== Early life and education ==
Jenkins was born in Fort Worth, Texas, She is the daughter of Hall of Fame sportswriter Dan Jenkins, who also once wrote for Sports Illustrated. She is a 1982 graduate of Stanford University, with a degree in English literature.

== Career ==
Jenkins was a sports columnist and feature writer for The Washington Post from 2000-2025. She was previously a senior writer for Sports Illustrated. She was a finalist for the 2020 Pulitzer Prize. Jenkins is the author of twelve books, four of which were New York Times bestsellers, including the number 1 bestseller Sum It Up: 1098 Victories, A Couple of Irrelevant Losses and A Life In Perspective, written with legendary basketball coach Pat Summitt, and It's Not About the Bike written with bicycle racer Lance Armstrong. Her work has been featured in Smithsonian Magazine, GQ, and Sports Illustrated, and Jenkins has been a correspondent on CNBC, as well as on NPR's All Things Considered.

=== Joe Paterno interview and column ===
In January 2012, Jenkins secured an interview with Pennsylvania State University (Penn State) football coach Joe Paterno shortly before his death. During the interview, she asked him his views on the Jerry Sandusky sexual molestation allegations. Her report of the interview was published January 13, 2012. In it she drew no firm conclusions about Paterno's culpability, but simply reported his words, and those of his lawyer.

On July 12, 2012, in a Washington Post follow-up column, after the release of the Freeh Report, she wrote: "Joe Paterno was a liar, there's no doubt about that now ... Paterno fell prey to the single most corrosive sin in sports: the belief that winning on the field makes you better and more important than other people."

=== Lance Armstrong ===
Jenkins co-wrote two best-selling autobiographies with cyclist Lance Armstrong, and defended Armstrong even after he admitted to doping and taking banned performance-enhancing substances while vehemently lying that he had done so, and was stripped of his seven Tour de France titles. In a column titled, "Why I’m not angry at Lance Armstrong", Jenkins wrote: "And I’m confused as to why using cortisone as an anti-inflammatory in a 2,000-mile race is cheating, and I wonder why putting your own blood back into your body is the crime of the century."

=== SafeSport ===
In October 2022, Jenkins wrote a column in the Washington Post about the United States Center for SafeSport. She called SafeSport “a false front … little more than another coverup operation, a litigation-avoidance ploy and bottomless pit into which to dump complaints and disguise inaction.” In conclusion, she wrote that SafeSport is "abuser-friendly," and a sham.

== Awards ==
It's Not About the Bike: My Journey Back to Life won the William Hill Sports Book of the Year award in 2000. It was also number one on the New York Times Best Seller list. The book was also awarded the Christopher Award for Adult Books in 2001. It also appeared in the Texas Tayshas Reading List from 2001 to 2002.

In 2001, 2003, 2010, 2011, and 2021 she won the Associated Press’s Sports Columnist of the Year Award. In 2001, 2008, and 2011 she was named Sports Columnist of the Year by the Society of Professional Journalists. She received the National Press Foundation's chairman citation in 2017.

In 2005 Jenkins became the first woman inducted into the National Sportscasters and Sportswriters Hall of Fame. She was inducted into the Washington DC Sports Hall of Fame in 2021. She was named the 2021 Red Smith Award winner.

== Books ==
- Jenkins, Sally (1996). Men Will Be Boys: The Modern Woman Explains Football and Other Amusing Male Rituals. Doubleday]. ISBN 0-385-48218-3.
- Summit, Pat; Sally Jenkins (1998). Reach for the Summit: The Definite Dozen System for Succeeding at Whatever You Do. Broadway Books. ISBN 0-7679-0229-7.
- Smith, Dean; John Kilgo; Sally Jenkins (1999). A Coach's Life: My Forty Years in College Basketball. Random House. ISBN 0-375-50270-X.
- Armstrong, Lance; Sally Jenkins (2000). It's Not About the Bike: My Journey Back to Life. G. P. Putnam's Sons. ISBN 0-399-14611-3.
- Runyan, Marla; Sally Jenkins (2001). No Finish Line. G. P. Putnam's Sons. ISBN 0-399-14803-5.
- Armstrong, Lance; Sally Jenkins (2004). Every Second Counts. Broadway Books. ISBN 0-7679-1448-1.
- Jenkins, Sally; Funny Cide Team (2004). Funny Cide: How a Horse, a Trainer, a Jockey, and a Bunch of High School Buddies Took on the Sheiks and Blue Bloods—and Won. G. P. Putnam's Sons. ISBN 0-399-15179-6.
- Jenkins, Sally (2007). The Real All Americans: The Team That Changed a Game, a People, a Nation. Random House. ISBN 978-0-7393-2719-7.
- Jenkins, Sally; John Stauffer (2009). The State of Jones. Doubleday. ISBN 978-0-385-52593-0.

== Personal life ==
Jenkins resides in New York, New York. She is in a relationship with Nicole Bengiveno.
