= Laureus World Sports Award for Sportsman of the Year =

Annual award ceremony

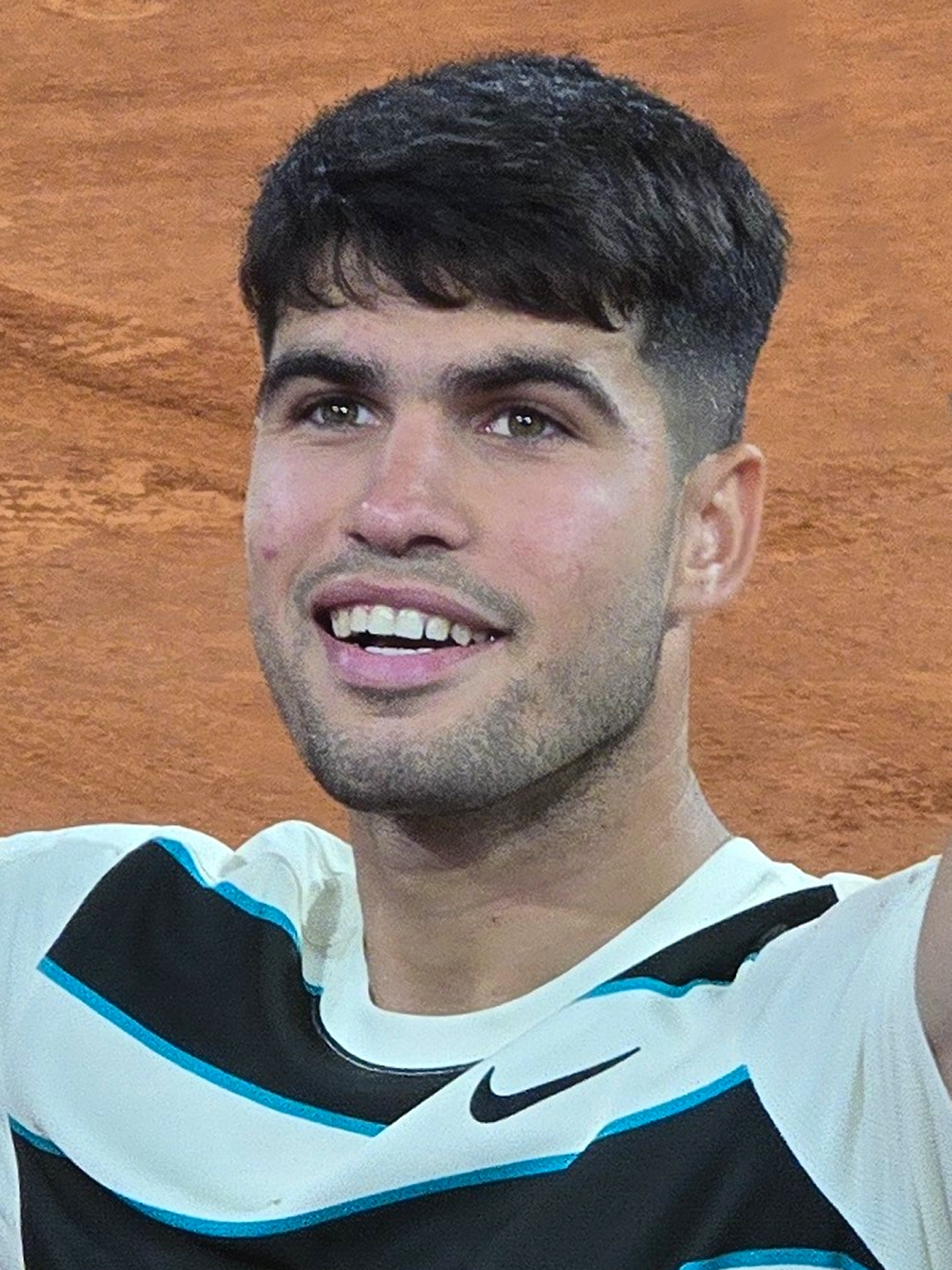
- Carlos Alcaraz, 2026 winner
- Awarded for: "The sportsman who best demonstrates supreme athletic performance and achievement"
- Location: Madrid (2026)
- Presented by: Laureus Sport for Good Foundation
- First award: 2000
- Currently held by: (Spain) Carlos Alcaraz

Highlights
- Most awards: (Serbia) Novak Djokovic (Switzerland) Roger Federer (5 awards each)
- Most nominations: (United States) Tiger Woods (Argentina) Lionel Messi (8 nominations each)
- Website: www.laureus.com/world-sports-awards

The Laureus World Sports Award for Sportsman of the Year is an annual award honoring the achievements of individual men from the world of sports. It was first awarded in 2000 as one of the seven constituent awards presented during the Laureus World Sports Awards. The awards are presented by the Laureus Sport for Good Foundation, a global organisation involved in more than 150 charity projects supporting 500,000 young people. The first ceremony was held on 25 May 2000 in Monte Carlo, at which Nelson Mandela gave the keynote speech. As of 2020, a shortlist of six nominees for the award comes from a panel composed of the "world's leading sports editors, writers and broadcasters". The Laureus World Sports Academy then selects the winner who is presented with a Laureus statuette, created by Cartier, at the annual awards ceremony held in various locations around the world. The awards are considered highly prestigious and are frequently referred to as the sporting equivalent of the "Oscars".

The inaugural winner of the award was the American golfer Tiger Woods who finished the 1999 season with 8 wins, a feat not achieved since 1974, including 1 major, the PGA Championship from 21 tournaments played. In 2000, Woods surpassed his previous season in multiple metrics, more wins (9) and major wins (3) in fewer tournaments (20), earning a second consecutive Laureus Award. The 2003 winner of the Laureus World Sports Award for Sportsman of the Year was the American road cyclist Lance Armstrong. He had been nominated the previous year, and earned further nominations in 2004, 2005 and 2006. Following Armstrong's 2013 admission of doping, all his Laureus awards and nominations were rescinded. Tennis players dominate the winners list, with thirteen awards, while athletes and Formula One drivers have won five times. As of 2026, excluding Armstrong, the Laureus World Sports Award for Sportsman of the Year has been won by 12 individuals since its inception at the start of the century. Roger Federer and Novak Djokovic hold the record for the most awards with five each. Lionel Messi and Tiger Woods have the nominations record (8). Michael Phelps, Valentino Rossi, and Cristiano Ronaldo have the most nominations without a win (5). The 2026 winner of the award was the Spanish tennis player Carlos Alcaraz.

== List of winners and nominees ==
Key
*	Indicates individual whose award or nomination was later rescinded

Laureus World Sports Award for Sportsman of the Year winners and nominees
Year	Image	Winner(s)	Nationality	Sport	Nominees	Refs
2000	Tiger Woods in 1997	Tiger Woods	USA	Golf	Andre Agassi (USA) – tennis Maurice Greene (USA) – athletics	
2001	Tiger Woods in 2001	Tiger Woods (2)	USA	Golf	Steve Redgrave (GBR) – rowing Michael Schumacher (GER) – Formula One; Ian Thorpe (AUS) – swimming Pieter van den Hoogenband (NED) – swimming	
2002	Michael Schumacher in 1994	Michael Schumacher	GER	Formula One	Lance Armstrong* (USA) – cycling Maurice Greene (USA) – athletics Ian Thorpe (AUS) – swimming Tiger Woods (USA) – golf	
2003	Lance Armstrong in 2003	Lance Armstrong*	USA	Cycling	Ole Einar Bjørndalen (NOR) – biathlon Ronaldo (BRA) – football Michael Schumacher (GER) – Formula One; Tiger Woods (USA) – golf	
2004	Michael Schumacher in 2005	Michael Schumacher (2)	GER	Formula One	Lance Armstrong* (USA) – cycling Roger Federer (SUI) – tennis Michael Phelps (USA) – swimming Valentino Rossi (ITA) – MotoGP; Jonny Wilkinson (GBR) – rugby union	
2005	Roger Federer in 2004	Roger Federer	SUI	Tennis	Lance Armstrong* (USA) – cycling Hicham El Guerrouj (MAR) – athletics Michael Phelps (USA) – swimming Valentino Rossi (ITA) – MotoGP; Michael Schumacher (GER) – Formula One	
2006	Roger Federer in 2005	Roger Federer (2)	SUI	Tennis	Fernando Alonso (ESP) – Formula One; Lance Armstrong* (USA) – cycling Ronaldinho (BRA) – football Valentino Rossi (ITA) – MotoGP; Tiger Woods (USA) – golf	
2007	Roger Federer in 2006	Roger Federer (3)	SUI	Tennis	Fernando Alonso (ESP) – Formula One; Fabio Cannavaro (ITA) – football Asafa Powell (JAM) – athletics Michael Schumacher (GER) – Formula One; Tiger Woods (USA) – golf	
2008	Roger Federer in 2007	Roger Federer (4)	SUI	Tennis	Tyson Gay (USA) – athletics Kaká (BRA) – football Michael Phelps (USA) – swimming Kimi Räikkönen (FIN) – Formula One; Tiger Woods (USA) – golf	
2009	Usain Bolt in 2009	Usain Bolt	JAM	Athletics	Lewis Hamilton (GBR) – Formula One; Rafael Nadal (ESP) – tennis Michael Phelps (USA) – swimming Cristiano Ronaldo (POR) – football Valentino Rossi (ITA) – MotoGP	
2010	Usain Bolt in 2011	Usain Bolt (2)	JAM	Athletics	Kenenisa Bekele (ETH) – athletics Alberto Contador (ESP) – cycling Roger Federer (SUI) – tennis Lionel Messi (ARG) – football Valentino Rossi (ITA) – MotoGP	
2011	Rafael Nadal in 2011	Rafael Nadal	ESP	Tennis	Kobe Bryant (USA) – basketball Andrés Iniesta (ESP) – football Lionel Messi (ARG) – football Manny Pacquiao (PHI) – boxing Sebastian Vettel (GER) – Formula One	
2012	Novak Djokovic in 2012	Novak Djokovic	SRB	Tennis	Usain Bolt (JAM) – athletics Cadel Evans (AUS) – cycling Lionel Messi (ARG) – football Dirk Nowitzki (GER) – basketball Sebastian Vettel (GER) – Formula One	
2013	Usain Bolt in 2012	Usain Bolt (3)	JAM	Athletics	Mo Farah (GBR) – athletics Lionel Messi (ARG) – football Michael Phelps (USA) – swimming Sebastian Vettel (GER) – Formula One; Bradley Wiggins (GBR) – cycling	
2014	Sebastian Vettel in 2012	Sebastian Vettel	GER	Formula One	Usain Bolt (JAM) – athletics Mo Farah (GBR) – athletics LeBron James (USA) – basketball Rafael Nadal (ESP) – tennis Cristiano Ronaldo (POR) – football	
2015	Novak Djokovic in 2015	Novak Djokovic (2)	SRB	Tennis	Lewis Hamilton (GBR) – Formula One; Renaud Lavillenie (FRA) – athletics Marc Márquez (ESP) – MotoGP; Rory McIlroy (NIR) – golf Cristiano Ronaldo (POR) – football	
2016	Novak Djokovic in 2016	Novak Djokovic (3)	SRB	Tennis	Usain Bolt (JAM) – athletics Stephen Curry (USA) – basketball Lewis Hamilton (GBR) – Formula One; Lionel Messi (ARG) – football Jordan Spieth (USA) – golf	
2017	Usain Bolt in 2017	Usain Bolt (4)	JAM	Athletics	Stephen Curry (USA) – basketball Mo Farah (GBR) – athletics LeBron James (USA) – basketball Andy Murray (GBR) – tennis Cristiano Ronaldo (POR) – football	
2018	Roger Federer in 2017	Roger Federer (5)	SUI	Tennis	Mo Farah (GBR) – athletics Chris Froome (GBR) – cycling Lewis Hamilton (GBR) – Formula One; Rafael Nadal (ESP) – tennis Cristiano Ronaldo (POR) – football	
2019	Novak Djokovic in 2017	Novak Djokovic (4)	SRB	Tennis	Lewis Hamilton (GBR) – Formula One; LeBron James (USA) – basketball Eliud Kipchoge (KEN) – athletics Kylian Mbappé (FRA) – football Luka Modrić (CRO) – football	
2020	Lewis Hamilton in 2018	Lewis Hamilton	GBR	Formula One	Eliud Kipchoge (KEN) – athletics Marc Márquez (ESP) – MotoGP; Rafael Nadal (ESP) – tennis Tiger Woods (USA) – golf	
2020	Lionel Messi in 2018	Lionel Messi	ARG	Football	Eliud Kipchoge (KEN) – athletics Marc Márquez (ESP) – MotoGP; Rafael Nadal (ESP) – tennis Tiger Woods (USA) – golf	
2021	Rafael Nadal in 2021	Rafael Nadal (2)	ESP	Tennis	Joshua Cheptegei (UGA) – athletics Armand Duplantis (SWE) – athletics Lewis Hamilton (GBR) – Formula One; LeBron James (USA) – basketball Robert Lewandowski (POL) – football	
2022	Max Verstappen in 2017	Max Verstappen	NED	Formula One	Tom Brady (USA) – American football Novak Djokovic (SRB) – tennis Caeleb Dressel (USA) – swimming Eliud Kipchoge (KEN) – athletics Robert Lewandowski (POL) – football	
2023	Lionel Messi in 2022	Lionel Messi (2)	ARG	Football	Stephen Curry (USA) – basketball Armand Duplantis (SWE) – athletics Kylian Mbappé (FRA) – football Rafael Nadal (ESP) – tennis Max Verstappen (NED) – Formula One	
2024	Novak Djokovic in 2023	Novak Djokovic (5)	SRB	Tennis	Armand Duplantis (SWE) – athletics Erling Haaland (NOR) – football Noah Lyles (USA) – athletics Lionel Messi (ARG) – football Max Verstappen (NED) – Formula One	
2025	Mondo Duplantis in 2023	Mondo Duplantis	SWE	Athletics	Carlos Alcaraz (ESP) – tennis Léon Marchand (FRA) – swimming Tadej Pogačar (SLO) – cycling ~~Jannik Sinner~~ (Note: Jannik Sinner was initially slated to be among the nominees for the award. However, on February 27, four days before the official list was released, the Laureus World Sports Academy announced the cancellation of his nomination due to his doping case.) ~~(ITA) – tennis~~ Max Verstappen (NED) – Formula One	
2026	Carlos Alcaraz	Carlos Alcaraz	ESP	Tennis	Ousmane Dembélé (FRA) – football Mondo Duplantis (SWE) – athletics Marc Márquez (ESP) – MotoGP; Tadej Pogačar (SLO) – cycling Jannik Sinner (ITA) – tennis	

== Statistics ==
Statistics are correct as of 2026 nominations.

Multiple titles
#	Athlete	Years
5	Roger Federer	2005–2008, 2018
5	Novak Djokovic	2012, 2015–2016, 2019, 2024
4	Usain Bolt	2009–2010, 2013, 2017
2	Tiger Woods	2000–2001
2	Michael Schumacher	2002, 2004
2	Rafael Nadal	2011, 2021
2	Lionel Messi	2020, 2023

Multiple nominations
#	Athlete	Years
8	Tiger Woods	2000–2003, 2006–2008, 2020
8	Lionel Messi	2010–2013, 2016, 2020, 2023–2024
7	Roger Federer	2004–2008, 2010, 2018
7	Usain Bolt	2009–2010, 2012–2014, 2016–2017
7	Lewis Hamilton	2009, 2015–2016, 2018–2021
7	Rafael Nadal	2009, 2011, 2014, 2018, 2020–2021, 2023
6	Michael Schumacher	2001–2005, 2007
6	Novak Djokovic	2012, 2015–2016, 2019, 2022, 2024
5	Valentino Rossi	2004–2006, 2009–2010
5	Michael Phelps	2004–2005, 2008–2009, 2013
5	Cristiano Ronaldo	2009, 2014–2015, 2017–2018
5	Armand Duplantis	2021, 2023–2026
4	Sebastian Vettel	2011–2014
4	Mo Farah	2013–2014, 2017–2018
4	LeBron James	2014, 2017, 2019, 2021
4	Max Verstappen	2022–2025
3	Eliud Kipchoge	2019–2020, 2022
3	Stephen Curry	2016–2017, 2023
3	Marc Márquez	2015, 2020, 2026
2	Maurice Greene	2000, 2002
2	Ian Thorpe	2001–2002
2	Fernando Alonso	2006–2007
2	Robert Lewandowski	2021–2022
2	Kylian Mbappé	2019, 2023
2	Carlos Alcaraz	2025–2026
2	Tadej Pogačar	2025–2026

Winners by nationality
Country	Winners	Nominations
SUI	5	7
SRB	5	6
JAM	4	8
GER	3	11
ESP	3	16
USA	2	29
ARG	2	8
GBR	1	16
NED	1	5
SWE	1	5
ITA	0	7
POR	0	5
FRA	0	5
AUS	0	3
BRA	0	3
KEN	0	3
NOR	0	2
POL	0	2
SLO	0	2
CRO	0	1
ETH	0	1
FIN	0	1
MAR	0	1
NIR	0	1
PHI	0	1
UGA	0	1

Winners by sport
Sport	Winners	Nominations
Tennis	13	25
Athletics	5	28
Formula One	5	24
Football	2	26
Golf	2	10
Swimming	0	10
Basketball	0	9
MotoGP	0	8
Cycling	0	6
American football	0	1
Biathlon	0	1
Boxing	0	1
Rowing	0	1
Rugby union	0	1
