= Every Second Counts (book) =

Autobiographical book by Lance Armstrong

- Author: Lance Armstrong, Sally Jenkins
- Language: English
- Genre: Autobiography
- Publisher: The Doubleday Broadway Publishing Group
- Publication date: October 7, 2003
- Media type: Print (Hardcover and Paperback), Audio CD, Audio cassette, Audio download
- Pages: 246 pp (Hardcover edition)
- ISBN: 0-385-50871-9 (Hardcover edition)
- OCLC: 52639201
- Dewey Decimal: 796.6/2/092 B 22
- LC Class: GV1051.A76 A3 2003b
- Preceded by: It's Not About the Bike: My Journey Back to Life

Every Second Counts is a 2003 autobiography by cyclist Lance Armstrong written in collaboration with sports writer and columnist Sally Jenkins. It is a follow-up to Armstrong's It's Not About the Bike: My Journey Back to Life which was also written with Sally Jenkins. The narrative begins from after Armstrong's first Tour de France win in 1999 and continues up until his fifth win in 2003. The authenticity of the tale and Armstrong's anti-doping stance described in the work was challenged by a report from USADA in 2012, and in 2013 Armstrong confessed that he had used doping in that period.

== See also ==
- It's Not About the Bike: My Journey Back to Life
