= It's Not About the Bike =

Book by Lance Armstrong

It's Not About the Bike: My Journey Back to Life
- Author: Lance Armstrong, Sally Jenkins
- Language: English
- Genre: Autobiography
- Publisher: Putnam
- Publication date: May 22, 2000
- Media type: Print (Hardcover and Paperback), Audio CD, Audio cassette
- Pages: 288 pp (Hardcover edition)
- ISBN: 0-399-14611-3 (Hardcover edition)
- OCLC: 43684677
- Dewey Decimal: 796.6/2/092 B 21
- LC Class: GV1051.A76 A3 2000
- Followed by: Every Second Counts

It's Not About the Bike: My Journey Back to Life is a 2000 autobiographical book by American cyclist Lance Armstrong with Sally Jenkins.

The book was written shortly after Armstrong had won the 1999 Tour de France: he went on to win it six further times in successive years, establishing a record (later revoked due to his use of performance-enhancing drugs). In 1996, he had been diagnosed with testicular cancer, which spread to his lungs, abdomen and brain, and was only given a 40 percent chance of living. This disrupted his career, but his success on his return prompted elements in the media to accuse him of doping.

The book covers his story from childhood to the 1999 Tour, and the birth of his first child. A subsequent autobiographical installment, entitled Every Second Counts and also with Sally Jenkins as co-author, continued the narrative until his 2003 Tour victory.

In light of the revelations made by the USADA investigation in 2012, the passages about doping in the book are doubtful.

== Summary ==
In 1993, 21-year-old Lance Armstrong becomes World Cycling Champion. In Austin, Texas, four years later on October 2, 1996, at age 25, Armstrong is diagnosed with testicular cancer with metastasis to the lungs and abdomen. On October 3, Dr Jim Reeves removes Armstrong's diseased testicle. On October 5, after banking sperm, Armstrong begins chemotherapy. The first chemo cycle Armstrong undergoes is BEP.

After receiving a letter from and talking to an oncologist, Steve Wolff, with events Armstrong discovers that the cancer has also spread to his brain. After Dr Wolff suggests Armstrong to get an opinion from Dr Lawrence Einhorn—the foremost expert on testicular cancer—Armstrong went to the Indiana University medical centre in Indianapolis. He decided to receive the rest of his treatment there. On October 25, Armstrong's brain lesions were removed by Dr Scott Shapiro. For the three remaining chemo cycles Armstrong was given an alternative protocol, VIP, by Craig Nichols — the primary oncologist. Armstrong completed chemotherapy on December 13, 1996, and by February 1997, he was declared cancer-free.

In 1997, Armstrong launched the Lance Armstrong Foundation (now Livestrong) to support those battling cancer. On May 8, 1998, he married Kristen Richard. In 1999 their first child, Luke David Armstrong, was born.
