= Wonders & Worries =

U.S. nonprofit organization

- Formation: August 8, 2001
- Founder: Meredith Cooper, MA, CCLS, LPC and Melissa Hicks, MS, CCLS, LPC, RPT
- Location: Austin, Texas
- Staff: 18
- Website: www.wondersandworries.org

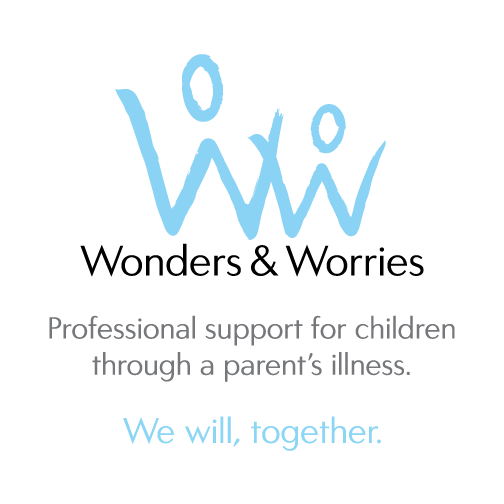

Wonders & Worries is a nonprofit organization (501(c)(3)) based in Austin, Texas, that provides professional support for children through a parent's illness, such as cancer, multiple sclerosis, diabetes, Lou Gehrig's disease, posttraumatic stress disorder and Alzheimer's disease.

Services are provided without charge in English or Spanish by a Certified Child Life Specialist to families in Central Texas. Pilot programs have been implemented in Raleigh, North Carolina; Ottawa, Canada; and San Antonio, Texas. A randomized clinical trial for the organization's curriculum is underway.

== History ==
Wonders & Worries was launched with the support of the Lance Armstrong Foundation (LAF), which provided funding in spring 2001 to conduct a pilot support group for children who had a parent with cancer. LAF provided an additional grant in fall 2001 to expand services to include a school-age support group, an adolescent support group, individual counseling for children who have a parent with cancer, and quarterly social functions to reunite Wonders & Worries clients.

== Services ==
Individual Sessions: for children aged 2–18yrs

Group Sessions: helping children aged 5+ meet other children coping with similar experiences

Child/Parent Relationship Training Classes: teaching parents how to reconnect with their children during an illness or following a loss

Informal Support / Recreational Group Activities – allowing families to enjoy being together in a fun, relaxing environment

Bereavement Support Sessions – helping families prepare for the end of life and gain skills that will help them cope with the loss

== See also ==
- Child Life Specialist
- Childhood bereavement
- Posttraumatic stress disorder (PTSD)
